= Bulgaria at the FIFA World Cup =

International football delegation

The FIFA World Cup is an international association football competition contested by the men's national teams of the members of Fédération Internationale de Football Association (FIFA), the sport's global governing body. The championship has been awarded every four years since the first tournament in 1930, except in 1942 and 1946, due to World War II.

The tournament consists of two parts, the qualification phase and the final phase (officially called the World Cup Finals). The qualification phase, which currently take place over the three years preceding the Finals, is used to determine which teams qualify for the Finals. The current format of the Finals involves 48 teams competing for the title, at venues within the host nation (or nations) over a period of about a month. The World Cup final is the most widely viewed sporting event in the world, with an estimated 715.1 million people watching the 2006 tournament final.

Bulgaria has appeared in the FIFA World Cup on seven occasions, the first being at the 1962 tournament. They appeared in the FIFA World Cup subsequently in 1966, 1970, 1974, 1986, 1994 and 1998. Their best performance was in 1994, where they finished in fourth place. They have failed to qualify for a FIFA World Cup since 1998.

== Record at the FIFA World Cup ==
Bulgaria's first appearance at the World Cup was at the seventh edition of the tournament in 1962. Between 1962 and 1974, they participated at four consecutive World Cup tournaments but did not survive the first round. Their best result followed in 1994, where they reached the semi-finals.

FIFA World Cup record									FIFA World Cup qualification record						
Year	Round	Position	Pld	W	D	L	GF	GA	Position	Pld	W	D	L	GF	GA
(Uruguay) 1930	Did not enter								Was not invited						
(Italy) 1934	Did not qualify								3rd	3	0	0	3	3	14
(France) 1938	Did not qualify								2nd	2	0	1	1	1	7
(Brazil) 1950	Did not enter								Declined participation						
(Switzerland) 1954	Did not qualify								3rd	4	0	1	3	3	7
(Sweden) 1958	Did not qualify								2nd	4	2	0	2	11	7
(Chile) 1962	Group stage	13th	3	0	1	2	1	7	1st	5	4	0	1	7	4
(England) 1966	Group stage	12th	3	0	0	3	1	8	1st	5	4	0	1	11	7
(Mexico) 1970	Group stage	12th	3	0	1	2	5	9	1st	6	4	1	1	12	7
(West Germany) 1974	Group stage	11th	3	0	2	1	2	5	1st	6	4	2	0	13	3
(Argentina) 1978	Did not qualify								2nd	4	1	2	1	5	6
(Spain) 1982	Did not qualify								3rd	8	4	1	3	11	10
(Mexico) 1986	Round of 16	15th	4	0	2	2	2	6	2nd	8	5	1	2	13	5
(Italy) 1990	Did not qualify								4th	6	1	1	4	6	8
(United States) 1994	Fourth place	4th	7	3	1	3	10	11	2nd	10	6	2	2	19	10
(France) 1998	Group stage	22nd	3	0	1	2	1	7	1st	8	6	0	2	18	9
(South Korea) (Japan) 2002	Did not qualify								3rd	10	5	2	3	14	15
(Germany) 2006	Did not qualify								3rd	10	4	3	3	17	17
(South Africa) 2010	Did not qualify								3rd	10	3	5	2	17	13
(Brazil) 2014	Did not qualify								4th	10	3	4	3	14	9
(Russia) 2018	Did not qualify								4th	10	4	1	5	14	19
(Qatar) 2022	Did not qualify								4th	8	2	2	4	6	14
(Canada) (Mexico) (United States) 2026	Did not qualify								4th	6	1	0	5	3	19
(Morocco) (Portugal) (Spain) 2030	To be determined								To be determined						
(Saudi Arabia) 2034	To be determined								To be determined						
Total	Fourth place	7/23	26	3	8	15	22	53	Total	137	62	29	46	215	191

*Draws include knockout matches decided via penalty shoot-out

=== By match ===
World Cup	Round	Opponent	Score	Result	Venue	Scorers
1962	Group 4	Argentina	0–1	L	Rancagua	—
1962	Group 4	Hungary	1–6	L	Rancagua	G. Sokolov
1962	Group 4	England	0–0	D	Rancagua	—
1966	Group 3	Brazil	0–2	L	Liverpool	—
1966	Group 3	Portugal	0–3	L	Manchester	—
1966	Group 3	Hungary	1–3	L	Manchester	G. Asparuhov
1970	Group 4	Peru	2–3	L	León	D. Dermendzhiev, H. Bonev
1970	Group 4	West Germany	2–5	L	León	A. Nikodimov, T. Kolev
1970	Group 4	Morocco	1–1	D	León	D. Zhechev
1974	Group 3	Sweden	0–0	D	Düsseldorf	—
1974	Group 3	Uruguay	1–1	D	Hanover	H. Bonev
1974	Group 3	Netherlands	1–4	L	Dortmund	R. Krol (o.g.)
1986	Group A	Italy	1–1	D	Mexico City	N. Sirakov
1986	Group A	South Korea	1–1	D	Mexico City	P. Getov
1986	Group A	Argentina	0–2	L	Mexico City	—
1986	Round of 16	Mexico	0–2	L	Mexico City	—
1994	Group D	Nigeria	0–3	L	Dallas	—
1994	Group D	Greece	4–0	W	Chicago	H. Stoichkov (2), Y. Letchkov, D. Borimirov
1994	Group D	Argentina	2–0	W	Dallas	H. Stoichkov, N. Sirakov
1994	Round of 16	Mexico	1–1 (a.e.t.) (3–1 pen.)	D	East Rutherford	H. Stoichkov
1994	Quarter-finals	Germany	2–1	W	East Rutherford	H. Stoichkov, Y. Letchkov
1994	Semi-finals	Italy	1–2	L	East Rutherford	H. Stoichkov
1994	Match for third place	Sweden	0–4	L	Pasadena	—
1998	Group D	Paraguay	0–0	D	Montpellier	—
1998	Group D	Nigeria	0–1	L	Paris	—
1998	Group D	Spain	1–6	L	Lens	E. Kostadinov

=== Record by opponent ===
FIFA World Cup matches (by team)
Opponent	Wins	Draws	Losses	Total	Goals Scored	Goals Conceded
Argentina	1	0	2	3	2	3
Brazil	0	0	1	1	0	2
England	0	1	0	1	0	0
Germany	1	0	0	1	2	1
Greece	1	0	0	1	4	0
Hungary	0	0	2	2	2	9
Italy	0	1	1	2	2	3
Mexico	0	1	1	2	1	3
Morocco	0	1	0	1	1	1
Netherlands	0	0	1	1	1	4
Nigeria	0	0	2	2	0	4
Paraguay	0	1	0	1	0	0
Peru	0	0	1	1	2	3
Portugal	0	0	1	1	0	3
South Korea	0	1	0	1	1	1
Spain	0	0	1	1	1	6
Sweden	0	1	1	2	0	4
Uruguay	0	1	0	1	1	1
West Germany	0	0	1	1	2	5

== Tournament summary ==
=== 1962 FIFA World Cup ===
Team	Pld	W	D	L	GF	GA	GR	Pts
Hungary	3	2	1	0	8	2	4.000	5
England	3	1	1	1	4	3	1.333	3
Argentina	3	1	1	1	2	3	0.667	3
Bulgaria	3	0	1	2	1	7	0.143	1

- England finished ahead of Argentina on goal average.
30 May 1962 (first round)
15:00 CLT (UTC-04)

Argentina	1–0	Bulgaria
Facundo 4'	Report

Estadio El Teniente, Rancagua
Attendance: 7,134
Referee: Juan Gardeazábal Garay (Spain)

3 June 1962 (first round)
15:00 CLT (UTC-04)

Hungary	6–1	Bulgaria
Albert 1', 6', 53'; Tichy 8', 70'; Solymosi 12'	Report	Sokolov 64'

Estadio El Teniente, Rancagua
Attendance: 7,442
Referee: Juan Gardeazábal Garay (Spain)

7 June 1962 (first round)
15:00 CLT (UTC-04)

England	0–0	Bulgaria
	Report

Estadio El Teniente, Rancagua
Attendance: 5,700
Referee: Antoine Blavier (Belgium)

=== 1966 FIFA World Cup ===
Team	Pld	W	D	L	GF	GA	GR	Pts
Portugal	3	3	0	0	9	2	4.500	6
Hungary	3	2	0	1	7	5	1.400	4
Brazil	3	1	0	2	4	6	0.667	2
Bulgaria	3	0	0	3	1	8	0.125	0

12 July 1966 (first round)
19:30 BST

Brazil	2–0	Bulgaria
Pelé 15'; Garrincha 63'	Report

Goodison Park, Liverpool
Attendance: 48,000
Referee: Kurt Tschenscher (West Germany)

16 July 1966 (first round)
15:00 BST

Portugal	3–0	Bulgaria
Vutsov 17' (o.g.); Eusébio 38'; Torres 81'	Report

Old Trafford, Manchester
Attendance: 26,000
Referee: José María Codesal (Uruguay)

20 July 1966 (first round)
19:30 BST

Hungary	3–1	Bulgaria
Davidov 43' (o.g.); Mészöly 45'; Bene 54'	Report	Asparuhov 15'

Old Trafford, Manchester
Attendance: 22,000
Referee: Roberto Goicoechea (Argentina)

=== 1970 FIFA World Cup ===
Team	Pld	W	D	L	GF	GA	GD	Pts
West Germany	3	3	0	0	10	4	+6	6
Peru	3	2	0	1	7	5	+2	4
Bulgaria	3	0	1	2	5	9	−4	1
Morocco	3	0	1	2	2	6	−4	1

All times local (UTC−6)

2 June 1970 (first round)
16:00

Peru	3–2	Bulgaria
Gallardo 50'; Chumpitaz 55'; Cubillas 73'	Report	Dermendzhiev 13'; Bonev 49'

Estadio Nou Camp, León
Attendance: 13,765
Referee: Antonio Sbardella (Italy)

GK	1	Luis Rubiños
DF	2	Eloy Campos	(substituted off) 29'
DF	3	Orlando de la Torre
DF	4	Héctor Chumpitaz (c)
DF	5	Nicolás Fuentes
MF	6	Ramón Mifflin
MF	7	Roberto Challe
FW	8	Julio Baylón	(substituted off) 51'
FW	9	Pedro Pablo León
FW	10	Teófilo Cubillas
FW	11	Alberto Gallardo
Substitutions:
MF	15	Javier González	(substituted on) 29'
FW	20	Hugo Sotil	(substituted on) 51'
Manager:
(Brazil) Didi

GK	1	Simeon Simeonov
DF	2	Aleksandar Shalamanov
DF	3	Ivan Dimitrov (c)
DF	5	Ivan Davidov
DF	4	Stefan Aladzhov
MF	8	Hristo Bonev	(substituted off) 73'
MF	6	Dimitar Penev
MF	10	Dimitar Yakimov
FW	7	Georgi Popov	(substituted off) 59'
FW	9	Petar Zhekov
FW	11	Dinko Dermendzhiev
Substitutions:
FW	18	Dimitar Marashliev	(substituted on) 59'
FW	19	Georgi Asparuhov	(substituted on) 73'
Manager:
Stefan Bozhkov

Assistant referees:
Abel Aguilar Elizalde (Mexico)
Yoshiyuki Maruyama (Japan)

7 June 1970 (first round)
12:00

Bulgaria	2–5	West Germany
Nikodimov 12'; Kolev 89'	Report	Libuda 20'; Müller 27', 52' (pen.), 88'; Seeler 67'

Estadio Nou Camp, León
Attendance: 12,710
Referee: José María Ortiz de Mendibil (Spain)

GK	1	Simeon Simeonov
DF	12	Milko Gaydarski
DF	14	Dobromir Zhechev
DF	17	Todor Kolev
DF	6	Dimitar Penev
MF	15	Boris Gaganelov (c)	(substituted off) 58'
MF	16	Asparuh Nikodimov
MF	11	Dinko Dermendzhiev	(substituted off) 46'
MF	19	Georgi Asparuhov
FW	18	Dimitar Marashliev
FW	8	Hristo Bonev
Substitutions:
DF	2	Aleksandar Shalamanov	(substituted on) 58'
MF	20	Vasil Mitkov	(substituted on) 46'
Manager:
Stefan Bozhkov

GK	1	Sepp Maier
DF	7	Berti Vogts
DF	3	Karl-Heinz Schnellinger
DF	11	Klaus Fichtel
DF	2	Horst-Dieter Höttges
MF	4	Franz Beckenbauer	(substituted off) 72'
MF	12	Wolfgang Overath
RW	14	Reinhard Libuda
FW	9	Uwe Seeler (c)
FW	13	Gerd Müller
LW	17	Hannes Löhr	(substituted off) 58'
Substitutions:
MF	6	Wolfgang Weber	(substituted on) 72'
FW	20	Jürgen Grabowski	(substituted on) 58'
Manager:
Helmut Schön

Assistant referees:
Guillermo Velasquez (Colombia)
Antonio Saldanha Ribeiro (Portugal)

11 June 1970 (first round)
16:00

Bulgaria	1–1	Morocco
Zhechev 40'	Report	Ghazouani 61'

Estadio Nou Camp, León
Attendance: 12,299
Referee: Antonio Ribeiro Saldanha (Portugal)

GK	13	Stoyan Yordanov
DF	12	Milko Gaydarski
DF	14	Dobromir Zhechev
DF	10	Dimitar Yakimov	(substituted off) 50'
DF	6	Dimitar Penev	(substituted off) 42'
MF	2	Aleksandar Shalamanov (c)
MF	16	Asparuh Nikodimov
MF	17	Todor Kolev
MF	7	Georgi Popov
FW	20	Vasil Mitkov
FW	19	Georgi Asparuhov
Substitutions:
DF	3	Ivan Dimitrov	(substituted on) 42'
FW	8	Hristo Bonev	(substituted on) 50'
Manager:
Stefan Bozhkov

GK	12	Mohammed Hazzaz
DF	3	Boujemaa Benkhrif
DF	13	Jalili Fadili
DF	4	Moulay Khanousi
DF	5	Kacem Slimani
MF	6	Mohammed Mahroufi
MF	8	Driss Bamous (c)	(substituted off) 46'
MF	10	Mohammed El Filali
MF	7	Said Ghandi
FW	17	Ahmed Alaoui	(substituted off) 74'
FW	11	Maouhoub Ghazouani
Substitutions:
FW	9	Ahmed Faras	(substituted on) 74'
MF	16	Moustapha Choukri	(substituted on) 46'
Manager:
(Socialist Federal Republic of Yugoslavia) Blagoje Vidinić

Assistant referees:
Tofiq Bahramov (Soviet Union)
Laurens van Ravens (Netherlands)

=== 1974 FIFA World Cup ===
Team	Pld	W	D	L	GF	GA	GD	Pts
Netherlands	3	2	1	0	6	1	+5	5
Sweden	3	1	2	0	3	0	+3	4
Bulgaria	3	0	2	1	2	5	−3	2
Uruguay	3	0	1	2	1	6	−5	1

15 June 1974 (first round)
16:00 CET

Sweden	0–0	Bulgaria
	Report

Rheinstadion, Düsseldorf
Attendance: 22,500
Referee: Edison Perez Nunez (Peru)

19 June 1974 (first round)
19:30 CET

Bulgaria	1–1	Uruguay
Bonev 75'	Report	Pavoni 87'

Niedersachsenstadion, Hanover
Attendance: 12,000
Referee: Jack Taylor (England)

23 June 1974 (first round)
16:00 CET

Netherlands	4–1	Bulgaria
Neeskens 5' (pen.), 44' (pen.); Rep 71' de Jong 88'	Report	Krol 78' (o.g.)

Westfalenstadion, Dortmund
Attendance: 52,100
Referee: Tony Boskovic (Australia)

=== 1986 FIFA World Cup ===
Bulgaria qualified for the World Cup in Mexico by finishing second in Group Four, behind France with 11 points, but worse goal difference, ahead of the teams of Yugoslavia, East Germany, and Luxembourg. This was their fifth World Cup appearance. They were drawn in Group A with Italy, Argentina, and South Korea. In the opening match of the World Cup, the Bulgarians held the defending champions Italy to a 1–1 draw. Alessandro Altobelli gave the Italians the lead, but an 85th-minute equalizer by Nasko Sirakov gave the Bulgarians the point. The next match was another 1–1 draw against South Korea with the goal for Bulgaria coming from Plamen Getov in the 11th minute. They lost the final match of the group 2–0 against Argentina, who ended up winning the tournament. Despite not recording a win, the Bulgarians advanced to the knockout stage by being the third-best third placed team. That way, Bulgaria and also Uruguay became the first nations to qualify for the knockout stage without winning a game in the first round. In the Round of 16, they faced World Cup hosts Mexico and lost the match 2–0. Ivan Vutsov was the manager of the team.

31 May 1986 (first round)
12:00 CST

Bulgaria	1–1	Italy
Sirakov 85'	Report	Altobelli 43'

Estadio Azteca, Mexico City
Attendance: 96,000
Referee: Erik Fredriksson (Sweden)

GK	1	Borislav Mihaylov
DF	3	Nikolay Arabov
DF	5	Georgi Dimitrov (c)
DF	13	Aleksandar Markov	(yellow card) 51'
MF	11	Plamen Getov
MF	10	Zhivko Gospodinov		(substituted off) 74'
MF	8	Ayan Sadakov
MF	12	Radoslav Zdravkov
MF	2	Nasko Sirakov
FW	7	Bozhidar Iskrenov		(substituted off) 65'
FW	9	Stoycho Mladenov
Substitutions:
FW	20	Kostadin Kostadinov		(substituted on) 65'
MF	6	Andrey Zhelyazkov		(substituted on) 74'
Manager:
(Bulgaria) Ivan Vutsov

GK	1	Giovanni Galli
DF	2	Giuseppe Bergomi	(yellow card) 48'
DF	3	Antonio Cabrini	(yellow card) 64'
DF	6	Gaetano Scirea (c)
DF	8	Pietro Vierchowod
MF	14	Antonio Di Gennaro
MF	10	Salvatore Bagni
MF	13	Fernando De Napoli
MF	16	Bruno Conti		(substituted off) 65'
FW	19	Giuseppe Galderisi
FW	18	Alessandro Altobelli
Substitutions:
FW	17	Gianluca Vialli		(substituted on) 65'
Manager:
(Italy) Enzo Bearzot

5 June 1986 (first round)
16:00 CST

South Korea	1–1	Bulgaria
Kim Jong-boo 70'	Report	Getov 11'

Estadio Olímpico Universitario, Mexico City
Attendance: 45,000
Referee: Fallaj Al Shanar (Saudi Arabia)

GK	21	Oh Yun-kyo
DF	2	Park Kyung-hoon
DF	5	Chung Yong-hwan
DF	8	Cho Young-jeung	(yellow card) 60'
MF	13	Noh Soo-jin		(substituted off) 46'
MF	4	Cho Kwang-rae		(substituted off) 72'
MF	17	Huh Jung-moo
MF	16	Kim Joo-sung	(yellow card) 31'
MF	10	Park Chang-sun (c)
FW	19	Byun Byung-joo
FW	11	Cha Bum-kun
Substitutions:
FW	7	Kim Jong-boo		(substituted on) 46'
DF	20	Kim Yong-se		(substituted on) 72'
Manager:
(South Korea) Kim Jung-nam

GK	1	Borislav Mihaylov
DF	3	Nikolay Arabov
DF	5	Georgi Dimitrov (c)
DF	4	Petar Petrov
MF	11	Plamen Getov		(substituted off) 58'
MF	10	Zhivko Gospodinov	(yellow card) 49'
MF	8	Ayan Sadakov
MF	12	Radoslav Zdravkov
MF	2	Nasko Sirakov
FW	7	Bozhidar Iskrenov		(substituted off) 46'
FW	9	Stoycho Mladenov
Substitutions:
FW	20	Kostadin Kostadinov		(substituted on) 46'
MF	6	Andrey Zhelyazkov		(substituted on) 58'
Manager:
(Bulgaria) Ivan Vutsov

10 June 1986 (first round)
12:00 CST

Argentina	2–0	Bulgaria
Valdano 3'; Burruchaga 76'	Report

Estadio Olímpico Universitario, Mexico City
Attendance: 65,000
Referee: Berny Ulloa Morera (Costa Rica)

GK	18	Nery Pumpido
DF	5	José Luis Brown
DF	13	Oscar Garré
DF	9	José Luis Cuciuffo	(yellow card) 25'
DF	19	Oscar Ruggeri
MF	2	Sergio Batista		(substituted off) 46'
MF	14	Ricardo Giusti
MF	7	Jorge Burruchaga
MF	10	Diego Maradona (c)
FW	4	Claudio Borghi		(substituted off) 46'
FW	11	Jorge Valdano
Substitutions:
MF	16	Julio Olarticoechea		(substituted on) 46'
MF	12	Héctor Enrique		(substituted on) 46'
Manager:
(Argentina) Carlos Bilardo

GK	1	Borislav Mihaylov
DF	4	Petar Petrov
DF	5	Georgi Dimitrov (c)
MF	11	Plamen Getov
MF	15	Georgi Yordanov
MF	6	Andrey Zhelyazkov
MF	8	Ayan Sadakov
MF	13	Aleksandar Markov
MF	2	Nasko Sirakov	(substituted off) 71'
FW	14	Plamen Markov
FW	9	Stoycho Mladenov	(substituted off) 52'
Substitutions:
FW	18	Boycho Velichkov	(substituted on) 52'
MF	12	Radoslav Zdravkov	(substituted on) 71'
Manager:
(Bulgaria) Ivan Vutsov

15 June 1986 (round of 16)
12:00 CST

Mexico	2–0	Bulgaria
Negrete 34'; Servín 61'	Report

Estadio Azteca, Mexico City
Attendance: 114,580
Referee: Romualdo Arppi Filho (Brazil)

GK	1	Pablo Larios
DF	18	Rafael Amador
DF	3	Fernando Quirarte
DF	14	Félix Cruz
DF	17	Raúl Servín
MF	7	Miguel España
MF	16	Carlos Muñoz
MF	10	Tomás Boy (c)	(substituted off) 79'
MF	13	Javier Aguirre
FW	22	Manuel Negrete
FW	9	Hugo Sánchez
Substitutions:
MF	6	Carlos de los Cobos	(substituted on) 79'
Manager:
(Socialist Federal Republic of Yugoslavia) Bora Milutinović

GK	1	Borislav Mihaylov
DF	3	Nikolay Arabov	(yellow card) 58'
DF	5	Georgi Dimitrov (c)
DF	4	Petar Petrov
MF	11	Plamen Getov		(substituted off) 59'
MF	15	Georgi Yordanov
MF	19	Atanas Pashev		(substituted off) 70'
MF	10	Zhivko Gospodinov
MF	8	Ayan Sadakov
MF	12	Radoslav Zdravkov
FW	20	Kostadin Kostadinov
Substitutions:
MF	2	Nasko Sirakov		(substituted on) 59'
FW	7	Bozhidar Iskrenov		(substituted on) 70'
Manager:
(Bulgaria) Ivan Vutsov

=== 1994 FIFA World Cup ===
Certainly one of the most important dates in Bulgarian football history is 17 November 1993, when Emil Kostadinov scored two goals to beat France in Paris, allowing Bulgaria to qualify for the World Cup in the United States in 1994. Under the management of Dimitar Penev, the Bulgarians, led by players such as Hristo Stoichkov, Yordan Letchkov, and Krasimir Balakov — along with a multitude of other talented players remembered in Bulgaria as the "Golden Generation" — made a strong impression by reaching the semi-finals. They entered Group D with Argentina, Nigeria, and Greece. Before that, the Bulgarians hadn't won a single match in five World Cup finals appearances. The first match ended with a 3–0 defeat by Nigeria. Despite the bad start, the team won 4–0 against World Cup-debuting featherweights Greece and 2–0 against Argentina. Argentina had actually been winning the group going into injury-time. A 91st-minute strike from Nasko Sirakov, however, meant that they dropped two places and finished third. Bulgaria continued to the next round, where they faced Mexico. The match ended 1–1 and after no goals were scored in extra time, penalties would decide which team would go through. Team captain Borislav Mihaylov made a good performance saving two of the penalty kicks. Bulgaria won 3–1 on penalties with Mihaylov becoming the hero for the Bulgarian team. In the quarter-finals, Bulgaria faced Germany. Lothar Matthäus scored from a penalty. The Bulgarians, however, managed to turn the game over with two goals by Hristo Stoichkov and Yordan Letchkov, giving them a 2–1 win and recording one of the most memorable wins for the team. Millions of Bulgarians celebrated this win in the Bulgarian capital city of Sofia and other Bulgarian cities. Having reached the semi-finals, this was the best Bulgarian performance in the World Cup. In the semi-finals, they lost 2–1 to Italy. The match for third place was lost to Sweden, 4–0, and Bulgaria eventually finished in fourth place. Hristo Stoichkov was awarded the Golden Boot as the top scorer in the tournament with six goals (shared with Oleg Salenko). Krasimir Balakov was named in the all-star team along with Stoichkov. Starting 11: GK-Mihaylov(c); RB-Kiryakov/Kremenliev, CB/SW-Hubchev, CB-Ivanov, LB-Tsvetanov; DM-Yankov, CM-Lechkov, CM-Balakov, AM/CF-Sirakov/Borimirov; CF/RW-Kostadinov, CF/LW-Stoichkov.

Pos	Team	Pld	W	D	L	GF	GA	GD	Pts	Qualification
1	Nigeria	3	2	0	1	6	2	+4	6	Advance to knockout stage
2	Bulgaria	3	2	0	1	6	3	+3	6 (Note: Head-to-head result: Argentina 0–2 Bulgaria.)	Advance to knockout stage
3	Argentina	3	2	0	1	6	3	+3	6	Advance to knockout stage
4	Greece	3	0	0	3	0	10	−10	0	

Source: FIFA
Notes:

All times local (EDT/UTC–4, CDT/UTC–5, PDT/UTC–7)

21 June 1994 (first round)
18:30 CDT

Nigeria	3–0	Bulgaria
Yekini 21'; Amokachi 43'; Amuneke 55'	Report

Cotton Bowl, Dallas
Attendance: 44,132
Referee: Rodrigo Badilla (Costa Rica)

Nigeria
Bulgaria

GK	1	Peter Rufai (c)
DF	2	Augustine Eguavoen
DF	3	Benedict Iroha
DF	5	Uche Okechukwu
DF	6	Chidi Nwanu
MF	7	Finidi George		(substituted off) 77'
FW	9	Rashidi Yekini
MF	11	Emmanuel Amunike	(yellow card) 73'
FW	12	Samson Siasia		(substituted off) 69'
FW	14	Daniel Amokachi
MF	15	Sunday Oliseh
Substitutions:
MF	21	Mutiu Adepoju		(substituted on) 69'
DF	13	Emeka Ezeugo		(substituted on) 77'
Manager:
(Netherlands) Clemens Westerhof

GK	1	Borislav Mihaylov (c)
RB	2	Emil Kremenliev
DF	3	Trifon Ivanov
LB	4	Tsanko Tsvetanov
DF	5	Petar Houbchev
MF	6	Zlatko Yankov
FW	7	Emil Kostadinov
FW	8	Hristo Stoichkov
MF	9	Yordan Letchkov	(yellow card) 54'	(substituted off) 59'
MF	11	Daniel Borimirov		(substituted off) 73'
MF	20	Krasimir Balakov
Substitutions:
FW	10	Nasko Sirakov		(substituted on) 59'
FW	13	Ivaylo Yordanov		(substituted on) 73'
Manager:
Dimitar Penev

Assistant referees:
Gordon Dunster (Australia)
Eugene Brazzale (Australia)
Fourth official:
Ali Bujsaim (United Arab Emirates)

26 June 1994 (first round)
11:30 CDT

Bulgaria	4–0	Greece
Stoichkov 5' (pen.), 55' (pen.); Letchkov 65'; Borimirov 90'	Report

Soldier Field, Chicago
Attendance: 63,160
Referee: Ali Bujsaim (United Arab Emirates)

Bulgaria
Greece

GK	1	Borislav Mihaylov (c)
DF	2	Emil Kremenliev
DF	3	Trifon Ivanov	(yellow card) 26'
DF	4	Tsanko Tsvetanov		(substituted off) 77'
DF	5	Petar Houbchev	(yellow card) 17'
MF	6	Zlatko Yankov	(yellow card) 33'
FW	7	Emil Kostadinov		(substituted off) 82'
FW	8	Hristo Stoichkov
MF	9	Yordan Letchkov
MF	10	Nasko Sirakov
MF	20	Krasimir Balakov
Substitutions:
DF	16	Ilian Kiriakov		(substituted on) 77'
MF	11	Daniel Borimirov	(yellow card) 84'	(substituted on) 82'
Manager:
Dimitar Penev

GK	20	Elias Atmatsidis
DF	2	Stratos Apostolakis (c)
DF	5	Ioannis Kalitzakis
MF	8	Nikos Nioplias
FW	9	Nikos Machlas
MF	12	Spiros Marangos
DF	13	Vaios Karagiannis	(yellow card) 70'
FW	16	Alexis Alexoudis	(yellow card) 6'	(substituted off) 58'
MF	17	Minas Hantzidis	(yellow card) 42'	(substituted off) 48'
DF	18	Kiriakos Karataidis
MF	19	Savvas Kofidis
Substitutions:
MF	10	Tasos Mitropoulos	(yellow card) 59'	(substituted on) 48'
FW	14	Vasilis Dimitriadis		(substituted on) 58'
Manager:
Alketas Panagoulias

Assistant referees:
Abdulla Al Ghattan (Bahrain)
Raimundo Calix Garcia (Honduras)
Fourth official:
Arturo Angeles (United States)

30 June 1994 (first round)
18:30 CDT

Argentina	0–2	Bulgaria
	Report	Stoichkov 61'; Sirakov 90'

Cotton Bowl, Dallas
Attendance: 63,998
Referee: Neji Jouini (Tunisia)

Argentina
Bulgaria

GK	12	Luis Islas
DF	3	José Chamot
MF	5	Fernando Redondo
DF	6	Oscar Ruggeri (c)	(yellow card) 34'
FW	7	Claudio Caniggia		(substituted off) 26'
FW	9	Gabriel Batistuta	(yellow card) 81'
DF	13	Fernando Cáceres
MF	14	Diego Simeone
DF	16	Hernán Díaz
FW	19	Abel Balbo
MF	20	Leonardo Rodríguez	(yellow card) 44'	(substituted off) 67'
Substitutions:
FW	17	Ariel Ortega		(substituted on) 26'
FW	11	Ramón Medina Bello		(substituted on) 67'
Manager:
Alfio Basile

GK	1	Borislav Mihaylov (c)
RB	2	Emil Kremenliev
DF	3	Trifon Ivanov	(yellow card) 58'
LB	4	Tsanko Tsvetanov	(yellow card) 45'	(yellow card) 67' (red card)
DF	5	Petar Houbchev
MF	6	Zlatko Yankov	(yellow card) 24'
FW	7	Emil Kostadinov			(substituted off) 74'
FW	8	Hristo Stoichkov	(yellow card) 7'
MF	9	Yordan Letchkov			(substituted off) 76'
MF	10	Nasko Sirakov
MF	20	Krasimir Balakov	(yellow card) 74'
Substitutions:
DF	16	Ilian Kiriakov		(substituted on) 74'
MF	11	Daniel Borimirov		(substituted on) 76'
Manager:
Dimitar Penev

Assistant referees:
Tapio Yli-Karro (Finland)
El Jilali Rharib (Morocco)
Fourth official:
Lim Kee Chong (Mauritius)

5 July 1994 (round of 16)
16:35

Mexico	1 – 1 (a.e.t.)	Bulgaria
García Aspe 18' (pen.)	Report	Stoichkov 6'
Penalties
García Aspe (penalty missed); Bernal (penalty missed); Rodríguez (penalty missed); Suárez (penalty scored)	1–3	(penalty missed) Balakov; (penalty scored) Guentchev; (penalty scored) Borimirov; (penalty scored) Letchkov

Giants Stadium, East Rutherford
Attendance: 71,030
Referee: Jamal Al Sharif (Syria)

Mexico
Bulgaria

GK	1	Jorge Campos
DF	2	Claudio Suárez	(yellow card) 14'
DF	3	Juan Ramírez
DF	4	Ignacio Ambríz (c)
DF	5	Ramón Ramírez	(yellow card) 70'
MF	6	Marcelino Bernal
MF	8	Alberto García Aspe	(yellow card) 76'
FW	10	Luis García	(yellow card) 28' (yellow-red card) 57'
FW	11	Luís Roberto Alves
MF	17	Benjamín Galindo
MF	20	Jorge Rodríguez
Substitutions:
Manager:
Miguel Mejía Barón

GK	1	Borislav Mihaylov (c)
DF	2	Emil Kremenliev	(yellow card) 12' (yellow-red card) 50'
DF	5	Petar Houbchev
FW	7	Emil Kostadinov		(substituted off) 119'
FW	8	Hristo Stoichkov
MF	9	Yordan Letchkov
FW	10	Nasko Sirakov	(yellow card) 17'	(substituted off) 104'
MF	11	Daniel Borimirov
FW	13	Ivaylo Yordanov	(yellow card) 67'
DF	16	Ilian Kiriakov	(yellow card) 34'
MF	20	Krassimir Balakov
Substitutions:
MF	14	Bontcho Guentchev		(substituted on) 104'
MF	17	Petar Mihtarski		(substituted on) 119'
Manager:
Dimitar Penev

10 July 1994 (quarter-finals)
12:05

Bulgaria	2–1	Germany
Stoichkov 75'; Letchkov 78'	Report	Matthäus 47' (pen.)

Giants Stadium, East Rutherford
Attendance: 72,000
Referee: José Torres Cadena (Colombia)

Bulgaria
Germany

GK	1	Borislav Mihaylov (c)	(yellow card) 85'
DF	3	Trifon Ivanov	(yellow card) 22'
DF	4	Tsanko Tsvetanov
DF	5	Petar Houbchev
MF	6	Zlatko Yankov
FW	7	Emil Kostadinov		(substituted off) 90'
FW	8	Hristo Stoichkov	(yellow card) 82'	(substituted off) 85'
MF	9	Yordan Letchkov
MF	10	Nasko Sirakov
DF	16	Ilian Kiriakov
MF	20	Krassimir Balakov
Substitutions:
FW	13	Ivaylo Yordanov		(substituted on) 85'
FW	14	Boncho Genchev		(substituted on) 90'
Manager:
Dimitar Penev

GK	1	Bodo Illgner
DF	4	Jürgen Kohler
DF	5	Thomas Helmer	(yellow card) 14'
DF	6	Guido Buchwald
MF	7	Andreas Möller
MF	8	Thomas Häßler	(yellow card) 49'	(substituted off) 83'
MF	10	Lothar Matthäus (c)
FW	13	Rudi Völler	(yellow card) 89'
DF	14	Thomas Berthold
MF	17	Martin Wagner	(yellow card) 15'	(substituted off) 59'
FW	18	Jürgen Klinsmann	(yellow card) 50'
Substitutions:
MF	2	Thomas Strunz		(substituted on) 59'
DF	3	Andreas Brehme		(substituted on) 83'
Manager:
Berti Vogts

13 July 1994 (semi-finals)
16:05

Bulgaria	1–2	Italy
Stoichkov 44' (pen.)	Report	R. Baggio 21', 25'

Giants Stadium, East Rutherford
Attendance: 74,110
Referee: Joël Quiniou (France)

Bulgaria
Italy

GK	1	Borislav Mihaylov (c)
DF	3	Trifon Ivanov
DF	4	Tsanko Tsvetanov
DF	5	Petar Houbchev
MF	6	Zlatko Yankov	(yellow card) 83'
FW	7	Emil Kostadinov	(yellow card) 52'	(substituted off) 72'
FW	8	Hristo Stoichkov		(substituted off) 79'
MF	9	Yordan Letchkov	(yellow card) 65'
MF	10	Nasko Sirakov
DF	16	Ilian Kiriakov
MF	20	Krassimir Balakov
Substitutions:
FW	13	Ivaylo Yordanov		(substituted on) 72'
MF	14	Bontcho Guentchev		(substituted on) 79'
Manager:
Dimitar Penev

GK	1	Gianluca Pagliuca
DF	3	Antonio Benarrivo
DF	4	Alessandro Costacurta	(yellow card) 61'
DF	5	Paolo Maldini (c)
DF	8	Roberto Mussi
FW	10	Roberto Baggio		(substituted off) 71'
MF	11	Demetrio Albertini	(yellow card) 80'
MF	13	Dino Baggio		(substituted off) 56'
MF	14	Nicola Berti
MF	16	Roberto Donadoni
FW	18	Pierluigi Casiraghi
Substitutions:
MF	15	Antonio Conte		(substituted on) 56'
FW	20	Giuseppe Signori		(substituted on) 71'
Manager:
Arrigo Sacchi

16 July 1994 (match for third place)
12:35

Sweden	4–0	Bulgaria
Brolin 8'; Mild 30'; Larsson 37'; K. Andersson 40'	Report

Rose Bowl, Pasadena
Attendance: 91,500
Referee: Ali Bujsaim (United Arab Emirates)

Sweden
Bulgaria

GK	1	Thomas Ravelli
DF	2	Roland Nilsson (c)
DF	3	Patrik Andersson
DF	4	Joachim Björklund
MF	6	Stefan Schwarz
FW	7	Henrik Larsson		(substituted off) 79'
MF	8	Klas Ingesson
FW	11	Tomas Brolin
DF	14	Pontus Kåmark
MF	18	Håkan Mild
FW	19	Kennet Andersson	(yellow card) 82'
Substitutions:
MF	16	Anders Limpar		(substituted on) 79'
Manager:
Tommy Svensson

GK	1	Borislav Mihaylov (c)		(substituted off) 45'
DF	3	Trifon Ivanov		(substituted off) 42'
DF	4	Tsanko Tsvetanov
DF	5	Petar Houbchev
MF	6	Zlatko Yankov	(yellow card) 70'
FW	7	Emil Kostadinov
FW	8	Hristo Stoichkov
MF	9	Yordan Letchkov
MF	10	Nasko Sirakov		(substituted off) 45'
DF	16	Ilian Kiriakov
MF	20	Krassimir Balakov
Substitutions:
DF	2	Emil Kremenliev		(substituted on) 42'
GK	12	Plamen Nikolov		(substituted on) 45'
FW	13	Ivaylo Yordanov		(substituted on) 45'
Manager:
Dimitar Penev

=== 1998 FIFA World Cup ===
Bulgaria qualified for the World Cup in France by finishing first in the Group 5, followed by Russia. They entered the competition with a new manager Hristo Bonev, since Dimitar Penev was sacked after Euro 1996. Bulgaria drew Spain, Nigeria, and Paraguay in Group D. The first match ended in a 0–0 goalless draw against Paraguay. In the second match, the Bulgarians lost 1–0 for a second-straight World Cup to Nigeria. The final match ended with a disappointing 6–1 defeat to Spain. Following the bad results, Bulgaria finished fourth in the group, with only one point, and didn't go through the next round. This was the last major appearance at World Cup level for Bulgaria.

Team	Pld	W	D	L	GF	GA	GD	Pts
Nigeria	3	2	0	1	5	5	0	6
Paraguay	3	1	2	0	3	1	+2	5
Spain	3	1	1	1	8	4	+4	4
Bulgaria	3	0	1	2	1	7	−6	1

12 June 1998 (first round)
14:30

Paraguay	0–0	Bulgaria
	Report

Stade de la Mosson, Montpellier
Attendance: 27,650
Referee: Abdul Rahman Al-Zeid (Saudi Arabia)

Paraguay
Bulgaria

GK	1	José Luis Chilavert (c)
DF	4	Carlos Gamarra
DF	5	Celso Ayala
FW	9	José Cardozo		(substituted off) 70'
MF	10	Roberto Acuña
DF	11	Pedro Sarabia
MF	13	Carlos Paredes
FW	15	Miguel Benítez	(yellow card) 45'
MF	16	Julio César Enciso
MF	19	Carlos Morales		(substituted off) 43'
MF	21	Jorge Campos		(substituted off) 78'
Substitutions:
DF	20	Denis Caniza		(substituted on) 43'
FW	18	César Ramírez		(substituted on) 70'
MF	7	Julio César Yegros		(substituted on) 78'
Manager:
(Brazil) Paulo César Carpegiani

GK	1	Zdravko Zdravkov
DF	2	Radostin Kishishev
DF	3	Trifon Ivanov (c)	(yellow card) 73'
DF	4	Ivaylo Petkov
MF	5	Ivaylo Yordanov
MF	6	Zlatko Yankov
FW	8	Hristo Stoichkov	(yellow card) 45'
FW	9	Luboslav Penev		(substituted off) 68'
MF	10	Krassimir Balakov
MF	11	Ilian Iliev		(substituted off) 77'
MF	16	Anatoli Nankov	(yellow card) 27' (yellow-red card) 89'
Substitutions:
FW	7	Emil Kostadinov		(substituted on) 68'
MF	18	Daniel Borimirov		(substituted on) 77'
Manager:
Hristo Bonev

Assistant referees:
Achmat Salie (South Africa)
Hussain Ghadanfari (Kuwait)
Fourth official:
Nikolai Levnikov (Russia)

19 June 1998 (first round)
17:30

Nigeria	1–0	Bulgaria
Ikpeba 26'	Report

Parc des Princes, Paris
Attendance: 45,500
Referee: Mario Sánchez Yanten (Chile)

Nigeria
Bulgaria

GK	1	Peter Rufai
DF	3	Celestine Babayaro
DF	5	Uche Okechukwu (c)	(yellow card) 44'
DF	6	Taribo West
MF	7	Finidi George		(substituted off) 84'
MF	8	Mutiu Adepoju	(yellow card) 20'
MF	10	Jay-Jay Okocha	(yellow card) 70'
MF	11	Garba Lawal
FW	14	Daniel Amokachi		(substituted off) 67'
MF	15	Sunday Oliseh
FW	20	Victor Ikpeba	(yellow card) 49'	(substituted off) 75'
Substitutions:
FW	4	Nwankwo Kanu		(substituted on) 67'
FW	9	Rasheed Yekini		(substituted on) 75'
MF	13	Tijani Babangida		(substituted on) 84'
Manager:
(Serbia and Montenegro) Bora Milutinović

GK	1	Zdravko Zdravkov
DF	2	Radostin Kishishev	(yellow card) 78'
DF	3	Trifon Ivanov (c)
DF	4	Ivaylo Petkov
MF	6	Zlatko Yankov		(substituted off) 84'
FW	7	Emil Kostadinov
FW	8	Hristo Stoichkov
MF	10	Krassimir Balakov
MF	11	Ilian Iliev	(yellow card) 66'	(substituted off) 66'
DF	13	Gosho Ginchev
MF	14	Marian Hristov		(substituted off) 45'
Substitutions:
MF	18	Daniel Borimirov		(substituted on) 45'
FW	9	Luboslav Penev		(substituted on) 66'
FW	19	Georgi Bachev		(substituted on) 84'
Manager:
Hristo Bonev

Assistant referees:
Jorge Diaz Galvez (Chile)
Arnaldo Pinto (Brazil)
Fourth official:
Marcio Rezende (Brazil)

24 June 1998 (first round)
21:00

Spain	6–1	Bulgaria
Hierro 5' (pen.); Luis Enrique 18'; Morientes 53', 80'; Kiko 88', 90'	Report	Kostadinov 56'

Stade Félix-Bollaert, Lens
Attendance: 38,100
Referee: Mario van der Ende (Netherlands)

Spain
Bulgaria

GK	1	Andoni Zubizarreta (c)
RB	15	Juan Carlos Aguilera	(yellow card) 16'
CB	20	Miguel Ángel Nadal
CB	4	Rafael Alkorta
LB	12	Sergi
RM	17	Joseba Etxeberria		(substituted off) 50'
CM	6	Fernando Hierro
CM	18	Guillermo Amor
LM	21	Luis Enrique		(substituted off) 69'
CF	7	Fernando Morientes
CF	11	Alfonso		(substituted off) 65'
Substitutions:
FW	10	Raúl		(substituted on) 50'
FW	19	Kiko		(substituted on) 65'
MF	8	Julen Guerrero	(yellow card) 73'	(substituted on) 69'
Manager:
Javier Clemente

GK	1	Zdravko Zdravkov
DF	2	Radostin Kishishev
DF	3	Trifon Ivanov (c)
MF	5	Ivaylo Yordanov
FW	7	Emil Kostadinov
FW	8	Hristo Stoichkov		(substituted off) 45'
MF	10	Krassimir Balakov		(substituted off) 61'
DF	13	Gosho Ginchev
MF	16	Anatoli Nankov		(substituted off) 28'
MF	18	Daniel Borimirov
FW	19	Georgi Bachev	(yellow card) 85'
Substitutions:
FW	9	Luboslav Penev	(yellow card) 45'	(substituted on) 28'
MF	11	Ilian Iliev		(substituted on) 45'
MF	14	Marian Hristov		(substituted on) 61'
Manager:
Hristo Bonev

Assistant referees:
Nicolae Grigorescu (Romania)
Claudio Rossi (Argentina)
Fourth official:
Nikolai Levnikov (Russia)

== Record players ==
Rank	Player	Matches	World Cups
1	Borislav Mihaylov	11	1986 and 1994
1	Nasko Sirakov	11	1986 and 1994
3	Krasimir Balakov	10	1994 and 1998
3	Emil Kostadinov	10	1994 and 1998
3	Hristo Stoichkov	10	1994 and 1998
6	Dimitar Penev	9	1966, 1970 and 1974
6	Trifon Ivanov	9	1994 and 1998
8	Zlatko Yankov	8	1994 and 1998
9	Georgi Asparuhov	7	1962, 1966 and 1970
9	Petar Houbchev	7	1994
9	Yordan Letchkov	7	1994
9	Daniel Borimirov	7	1994 and 1998
9	Ivaylo Yordanov	7	1994 and 1998

== Top goalscorers ==
On June 3, 1962, Georgi Sokolov made history by scoring Bulgaria's first-ever FIFA World Cup goal. He did so against Hungary in Rancagua.

Rank	Player	Goals	World Cups
1	Hristo Stoichkov	6	1994
2	Hristo Bonev	2	1970 and 1974
2	Nasko Sirakov	2	1986 and 1994
2	Yordan Letchkov	2	1994
5	Georgi Sokolov	1	1962
5	Georgi Asparuhov	1	1966
5	Dinko Dermendzhiev	1	1970
5	Todor Kolev	1	1970
5	Asparuh Nikodimov	1	1970
5	Dobromir Zhechev	1	1970
5	Plamen Getov	1	1986
5	Daniel Borimirov	1	1994
5	Emil Kostadinov	1	1998

== Individual awards ==
- Golden Boot 1994: Hristo Stoichkov (shared)
- Bronze Ball 1994: Hristo Stoichkov

== See also ==
- Bulgaria at the UEFA European Championship
