= 1994 FIFA World Cup Group D =

Football tournament group stage

Group D of the 1994 FIFA World Cup was one of six groups of four teams competing at the 1994 World Cup in the United States. The first match was played June 21, 1994, and the final games took place simultaneously on June 30, 1994.

The group consisted of Argentina, Greece, Nigeria, and Bulgaria. Nigeria won the group on goal difference, Bulgaria finished second, and Argentina qualified as one of the best third-placed teams (Bulgaria defeated Argentina in the group stage, thus their higher rank). Bulgaria and Argentina had previously met before in the group stage, in 1962; neither team advanced into the knockout stage. Bulgaria and Argentina had also met in 1986, both teams advanced to the knockout stage.

Group D was also notable for the end of Diego Maradona's international career. Maradona, who was Argentina's captain and star player, was found to contain ephedrine, a performance-enhancing stimulant, in his system after being subjected to an anti-doping test held during their match with Nigeria. In his absence, Argentina would lose their final group match against Bulgaria, and were eliminated by Romania 3–2 at the Round of 16. Maradona's only goal in the tournament against Greece would prove to be his last for Argentina.

== Standings ==
Pos	Team	Pld	W	D	L	GF	GA	GD	Pts	Qualification
1	Nigeria	3	2	0	1	6	2	+4	6	Advance to knockout stage
2	Bulgaria	3	2	0	1	6	3	+3	6 (Note: Head-to-head result: Argentina 0–2 Bulgaria.)	Advance to knockout stage
3	Argentina	3	2	0	1	6	3	+3	6	Advance to knockout stage
4	Greece	3	0	0	3	0	10	−10	0	

Source: FIFA

== Matches ==
All times local (EDT/UTC–4, CDT/UTC–5, PDT/UTC–7)

=== Argentina vs Greece ===
June 21, 1994
12:30 p.m. EDT

Argentina	4–0	Greece
Batistuta 2', 45', 90+2' (pen.); Maradona 60'

Foxboro Stadium, Foxborough
Attendance: 54,456
Referee: Arturo Angeles (United States)

Argentina	Greece

GK	12	Luis Islas
RB	4	Roberto Sensini
CB	13	Fernando Cáceres	(yellow card) 40'
CB	6	Oscar Ruggeri
LB	3	José Chamot
CM	14	Diego Simeone
CM	5	Fernando Redondo
AM	10	Diego Maradona (c)		(substituted off) 84'
RF	7	Claudio Caniggia
CF	9	Gabriel Batistuta
LF	19	Abel Balbo		(substituted off) 81'
Substitutions:
MF	21	Alejandro Mancuso		(substituted on) 81'
FW	17	Ariel Ortega		(substituted on) 84'
Manager:
Alfio Basile

GK	1	Antonis Minou
RB	2	Stratos Apostolakis
CB	4	Stelios Manolas	(yellow card) 55'
CB	5	Giannis Kalitzakis
LB	3	Thanasis Kolitsidakis
CM	19	Savvas Kofidis
CM	6	Panagiotis Tsalouchidis	(yellow card) 25'
CM	8	Nikos Nioplias
RF	7	Dimitris Saravakos (c)
CF	9	Nikos Machlas		(substituted off) 59'
LF	11	Nikos Tsiantakis		(substituted off) 45'
Substitutions:
MF	12	Spyros Marangos		(substituted on) 45'
MF	10	Tasos Mitropoulos		(substituted on) 59'
Manager:
Alketas Panagoulias

Assistant referees:
Park Hae-yong (South Korea)
Jan Dolstra (Netherlands)
Fourth official:
Mario van der Ende (Netherlands)

=== Nigeria vs Bulgaria ===
June 21, 1994
6:30 p.m. CDT

Nigeria	3–0	Bulgaria
Yekini 21'; Amokachi 43'; Amunike 55'

Cotton Bowl, Dallas
Attendance: 44,132
Referee: Rodrigo Badilla (Costa Rica)

Nigeria	Bulgaria

GK	1	Peter Rufai (c)
RB	2	Augustine Eguavoen
CB	5	Uche Okechukwu
CB	6	Chidi Nwanu
LB	3	Benedict Iroha
DM	15	Sunday Oliseh
RM	7	Finidi George		(substituted off) 77'
CM	12	Samson Siasia		(substituted off) 69'
LM	11	Emmanuel Amunike	(yellow card) 73'
CF	9	Rashidi Yekini
CF	14	Daniel Amokachi
Substitutions:
MF	21	Mutiu Adepoju		(substituted on) 69'
DF	13	Emeka Ezeugo		(substituted on) 77'
Manager:
(Netherlands) Clemens Westerhof

GK	1	Borislav Mihaylov (c)
RB	2	Emil Kremenliev
CB	3	Trifon Ivanov
CB	5	Petar Hubchev
LB	4	Tsanko Tsvetanov
RM	11	Daniel Borimirov		(substituted off) 73'
CM	6	Zlatko Yankov
CM	9	Yordan Letchkov	(yellow card) 54'	(substituted off) 59'
LM	20	Krasimir Balakov
CF	7	Emil Kostadinov
CF	8	Hristo Stoichkov
Substitutions:
FW	10	Nasko Sirakov		(substituted on) 59'
FW	13	Ivaylo Yordanov		(substituted on) 73'
Manager:
Dimitar Penev

Assistant referees:
Gordon Dunster (Australia)
Eugene Brazzale (Australia)
Fourth official:
Ali Bujsaim (United Arab Emirates)

=== Argentina vs Nigeria ===
June 25, 1994
4:00 p.m. EDT

Argentina	2–1	Nigeria
Caniggia 21', 28'		Siasia 8'

Foxboro Stadium, Foxborough
Attendance: 54,453
Referee: Bo Karlsson (Sweden)

Argentina	Nigeria

GK	12	Luis Islas
DF	4	Roberto Sensini		(substituted off) 88'
DF	13	Fernando Cáceres
DF	6	Oscar Ruggeri
DF	3	José Chamot
MF	14	Diego Simeone
MF	5	Fernando Redondo
MF	10	Diego Maradona (c)
FW	7	Claudio Caniggia	(yellow card) 54'
FW	9	Gabriel Batistuta
FW	19	Abel Balbo		(substituted off) 72'
Substitutions:
MF	21	Alejandro Mancuso		(substituted on) 72'
DF	16	Hernán Díaz		(substituted on) 88'
Manager:
Alfio Basile

GK	1	Peter Rufai (c)
DF	2	Augustine Eguavoen	(yellow card) 20'
DF	5	Uche Okechukwu
DF	6	Chidi Nwanu
DF	19	Michael Emenalo	(yellow card) 53'
MF	7	Finidi George
MF	12	Samson Siasia		(substituted off) 57'
MF	15	Sunday Oliseh		(substituted off) 88'
MF	11	Emmanuel Amunike
FW	9	Rashidi Yekini
FW	14	Daniel Amokachi
Substitutions:
MF	21	Mutiu Adepoju		(substituted on) 57'
MF	10	Jay-Jay Okocha		(substituted on) 88'
Manager:
(Netherlands) Clemens Westerhof

Assistant referees:
Mikael Erik Everstig (Sweden)
Luc Matthys (Belgium)
Fourth official:
Leslie Mottram (Scotland)

=== Bulgaria vs Greece ===
June 26, 1994
11:30 a.m. CDT

Bulgaria	4–0	Greece
Stoichkov 5' (pen.), 55' (pen.); Letchkov 65'; Borimirov 90'

Soldier Field, Chicago
Attendance: 63,160
Referee: Ali Bujsaim (United Arab Emirates)

Bulgaria	Greece

GK	1	Borislav Mihaylov (c)
RB	2	Emil Kremenliev
CB	3	Trifon Ivanov	(yellow card) 26'
CB	5	Petar Hubchev	(yellow card) 17'
LB	4	Tsanko Tsvetanov		(substituted off) 77'
DM	6	Zlatko Yankov	(yellow card) 33'
CM	9	Yordan Letchkov
CM	20	Krasimir Balakov
RF	7	Emil Kostadinov		(substituted off) 82'
CF	10	Nasko Sirakov
LF	8	Hristo Stoichkov
Substitutions:
DF	16	Iliyan Kiryakov		(substituted on) 77'
MF	11	Daniel Borimirov	(yellow card) 84'	(substituted on) 82'
Manager:
Dimitar Penev

GK	20	Elias Atmatsidis
RB	2	Stratos Apostolakis (c)
CB	18	Kyriakos Karataidis
CB	5	Ioannis Kalitzakis
LB	13	Vaios Karagiannis	(yellow card) 70'
RM	12	Spiros Marangos
CM	19	Savvas Kofidis
CM	17	Minas Hantzidis	(yellow card) 42'	(substituted off) 46'
LM	8	Nikos Nioplias
CF	9	Nikos Machlas
CF	16	Alexis Alexoudis	(yellow card) 6'	(substituted off) 58'
Substitutions:
MF	10	Tasos Mitropoulos	(yellow card) 59'	(substituted on) 46'
FW	14	Vasilis Dimitriadis		(substituted on) 58'
Manager:
Alketas Panagoulias

Assistant referees:
Abdulla Al Ghattan (Bahrain)
Raimundo Calix Garcia (Honduras)
Fourth official:
Arturo Angeles (United States)

=== Argentina vs Bulgaria ===
June 30, 1994
6:30 p.m. CDT

Argentina	0–2	Bulgaria
		Stoichkov 61'; Sirakov 90+3'

Cotton Bowl, Dallas
Attendance: 63,998
Referee: Neji Jouini (Tunisia)

Argentina	Bulgaria

GK	12	Luis Islas
DF	16	Hernán Díaz
DF	13	Fernando Cáceres
DF	6	Oscar Ruggeri (c)	(yellow card) 34'
DF	3	José Chamot
MF	14	Diego Simeone
MF	5	Fernando Redondo
MF	20	Leonardo Rodríguez	(yellow card) 44'	(substituted off) 67'
FW	7	Claudio Caniggia		(substituted off) 26'
FW	9	Gabriel Batistuta	(yellow card) 81'
FW	19	Abel Balbo
Substitutions:
FW	17	Ariel Ortega		(substituted on) 26'
FW	11	Ramón Medina Bello		(substituted on) 67'
Manager:
Alfio Basile

GK	1	Borislav Mihaylov (c)
RB	2	Emil Kremenliev
CB	3	Trifon Ivanov	(yellow card) 58'
CB	5	Petar Hubchev
LB	4	Tsanko Tsvetanov	(yellow card) 45' (yellow-red card) 67'
MF	6	Zlatko Yankov	(yellow card) 24'
MF	9	Yordan Letchkov		(substituted off) 76'
MF	10	Nasko Sirakov
MF	20	Krasimir Balakov	(yellow card) 74'
FW	7	Emil Kostadinov		(substituted off) 74'
FW	8	Hristo Stoichkov	(yellow card) 7'
Substitutions:
DF	16	Iliyan Kiryakov		(substituted on) 74'
MF	11	Daniel Borimirov		(substituted on) 76'
Manager:
Dimitar Penev

Assistant referees:
Tapio Yli-Karro (Finland)
El Jilali Rharib (Morocco)
Fourth official:
Lim Kee Chong (Mauritius)

=== Greece vs Nigeria ===
June 30, 1994
7:30 p.m. EDT

Greece	0–2	Nigeria
		George 45+2'; Amokachi 90+5'

Foxboro Stadium, Foxborough
Attendance: 53,001
Referee: Leslie Mottram (Scotland)

Greece	Nigeria

GK	15	Christos Karkamanis
DF	5	Ioannis Kalitzakis	(yellow card) 41'
DF	22	Alexis Alexiou
DF	13	Vaios Karagiannis
MF	17	Minas Hantzidis
MF	6	Giotis Tsalouchidis
MF	10	Tasos Mitropoulos (c)	(yellow card) 32'	(substituted off) 72'
MF	21	Alekos Alexandris
MF	8	Nikos Nioplias
MF	19	Savvas Kofidis
FW	9	Nikos Machlas		(substituted off) 80'
Substitutions:
MF	11	Nikos Tsiantakis		(substituted on) 72'
FW	14	Vasilis Dimitriadis		(substituted on) 80'
Manager:
Alketas Panagoulias

GK	1	Peter Rufai
DF	6	Chidi Nwanu
DF	4	Stephen Keshi (c)	(yellow card) 70'
DF	5	Uche Okechukwu
DF	19	Michael Emenalo
MF	7	Finidi George		(substituted off) 84'
MF	12	Samson Siasia
MF	15	Sunday Oliseh	(yellow card) 66'
MF	11	Emmanuel Amunike
FW	9	Rashidi Yekini		(substituted off) 69'
FW	14	Daniel Amokachi
Substitutions:
MF	10	Jay-Jay Okocha		(substituted on) 69'
MF	21	Mutiu Adepoju		(substituted on) 84'
Manager:
(Netherlands) Clemens Westerhof

Assistant referees:
Park Hae-yong (South Korea)
Paulo Jorge Alves (Brazil)
Fourth official:
José Torres Cadena (Colombia)

== See also ==
- Argentina at the FIFA World Cup
- Bulgaria at the FIFA World Cup
- Greece at the FIFA World Cup
- Nigeria at the FIFA World Cup
