= 1994 Bulgarian Cup final =

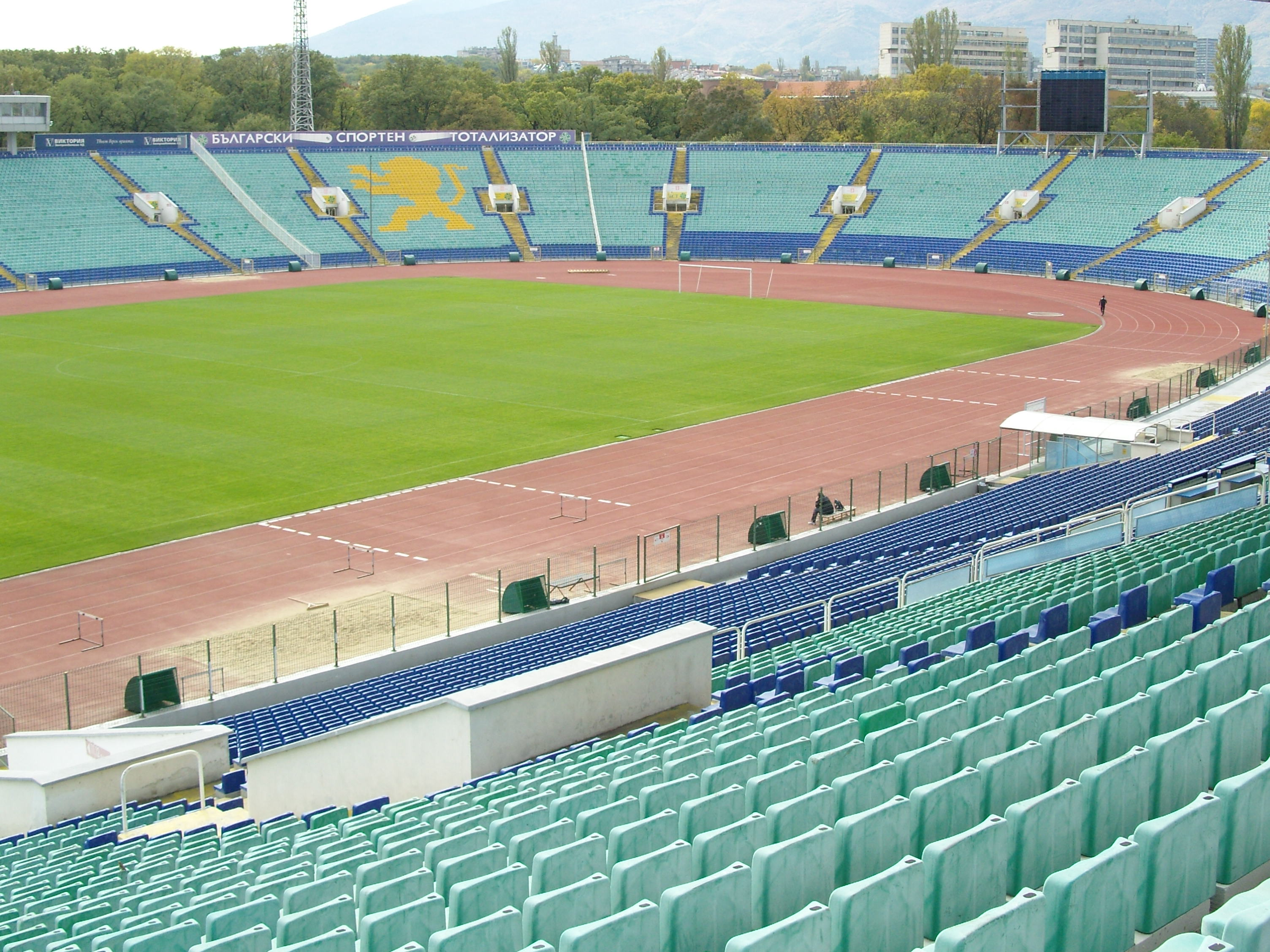
- Event: 1993–94 Bulgarian Cup
Pirin Blagoevgrad	Levski Sofia
0	1
- Date: 4 May 1994
- Venue: Vasil Levski National Stadium, Sofia
- Referee: Lyuben Angelov
- Attendance: 18,000

The 1994 Bulgarian Cup final was the 54th final of the Bulgarian Cup, and was contested between Pirin Blagoevgrad and Levski Sofia on 4 May 1994 at Vasil Levski National Stadium in Sofia. Levski won the final 1–0.

== Match ==
=== Details ===
4 May 1994

Pirin Blagoevgrad	0−1	Levski Sofia
		Iliev 87'

Vasil Levski National Stadium, Sofia
Attendance: 18,000
Referee: Lyuben Angelov

Pirin	Levski

GK	1	(Bulgaria) Miroslav Mitev (c)
DF	2	(Bulgaria) Kostadin Trendafilov
MF	3	(Bulgaria) Hristo Voynov
DF	4	(Bulgaria) Stefan Goshev
DF	5	(Bulgaria) Dobromir Mitov
MF	6	(Bulgaria) Venko Popov
MF	7	(Bulgaria) Kostadin Gerganchev
FW	8	(Bulgaria) Bozhidar Yankov
MF	9	(Bulgaria) Stoycho Stoilov
DF	10	(Bulgaria) Milen Radukanov	(substituted off) 15'
FW	11	(Bulgaria) Petar Mihtarski	(substituted off) 61'
Substitutes:
GK	12	(Bulgaria) Kiril Stoykov
FW	13	(Bulgaria) Georgi Bachev
MF	14	(North Macedonia) Sasha Todorovski	(substituted in) 61'
MF	15	(North Macedonia) Stojmir Urošević
DF	16	(Bulgaria) Martin Goranov	(substituted in) 15'
Manager:
(Bulgaria) Yordan Kostov

GK	1	(Ukraine) Oleg Morgun
DF	2	(Bulgaria) Emil Kremenliev
DF	3	(Bulgaria) Gosho Ginchev
DF	4	(Bulgaria) Tsanko Tsvetanov
MF	5	(Bulgaria) Zlatko Yankov
DF	6	(Bulgaria) Georgi Slavchev
MF	7	(Bulgaria) Daniel Borimirov
FW	8	(Bulgaria) Nasko Sirakov (c)
FW	9	(Bulgaria) Petar Aleksandrov	(substituted off) 70'
MF	10	(Bulgaria) Nikolay Todorov	(substituted off) 56'
MF	11	(Bulgaria) Ilian Iliev
Substitutes:
GK	12	(Bulgaria) Plamen Nikolov
DF	13	(Bulgaria) Valentin Dartilov
DF	14	(Bulgaria) Aleksandar Markov	(substituted in) 56'
MF	15	(Bulgaria) Diyan Angelov
FW	16	(Bulgaria) Dimitar Trendafilov	(substituted in) 70'
Manager:
(Bulgaria) Georgi Vasilev

MAN OF THE MATCH

MATCH OFFICIALS

- Assistant referees:Yordan Yordanov & Emil Yanchev
- Fourth official:

MATCH RULES

- 90 minutes.
- 30 minutes of extra-time if necessary.
- Penalty shoot-out if scores still level.
- Five named substitutes.
- Maximum of two substitutions.

== See also ==
- 1993–94 A Group
