= 1986 FIFA World Cup Group A =

Football tournament group stage

Group A of the 1986 FIFA World Cup was one of six groups of national teams competing at the 1986 FIFA World Cup. The group's first round of matches began on 31 May and its last matches were played on 10 June. Most matches were played at the Estadio Olímpico Universitario in Mexico City or at the Estadio Cuauhtémoc in Puebla. Eventual champions Argentina topped the group, joined in the second round by 1982 champions Italy as well as Bulgaria. South Korea were making their first appearance in the tournament since 1954.

== Standings ==
| Pos | Team | Pld | W | D | L | GF | GA | GD | Pts | Qualification |
|---|---|---|---|---|---|---|---|---|---|---|
| 1 | Argentina | 3 | 2 | 1 | 0 | 6 | 2 | +4 | 5 | Advance to knockout stage |
| 2 | Italy | 3 | 1 | 2 | 0 | 5 | 4 | +1 | 4 | Advance to knockout stage |
| 3 | Bulgaria | 3 | 0 | 2 | 1 | 2 | 4 | −2 | 2 | Advance to knockout stage |
| 4 | South Korea | 3 | 0 | 1 | 2 | 4 | 7 | −3 | 1 | |

Source: FIFA

== Matches ==
=== Bulgaria vs Italy ===
31 May 1986
12:00 CST

| Bulgaria | 1–1 | Italy |
|---|---|---|
| Sirakov 85' | | Altobelli 44' |

Estadio Azteca, Mexico City
Attendance: 96,000
Referee: Erik Fredriksson (Sweden)

| Bulgaria | Italy |

| GK | 1 | Borislav Mihaylov |
| DF | 3 | Nikolay Arabov |
| DF | 5 | Georgi Dimitrov (c) |
| DF | 13 | Aleksandar Markov | (yellow card) 51' |
| MF | 11 | Plamen Getov |
| MF | 10 | Zhivko Gospodinov | | (substituted off) 74' |
| MF | 8 | Ayan Sadakov |
| MF | 12 | Radoslav Zdravkov |
| MF | 2 | Nasko Sirakov |
| FW | 7 | Bozhidar Iskrenov | | (substituted off) 65' |
| FW | 9 | Stoycho Mladenov |
Substitutions:
| GK | 22 | Iliya Valov |
| DF | 4 | Petar Petrov |
| MF | 6 | Andrey Zhelyazkov | | (substituted on) 74' |
| MF | 15 | Georgi Yordanov |
| FW | 20 | Kostadin Kostadinov | | (substituted on) 65' |
Manager:
(Bulgaria) Ivan Vutsov

| GK | 1 | Giovanni Galli |
| RB | 2 | Giuseppe Bergomi | (yellow card) 48' |
| CB | 6 | Gaetano Scirea (c) |
| CB | 8 | Pietro Vierchowod |
| LB | 3 | Antonio Cabrini | (yellow card) 64' |
| MF | 14 | Antonio Di Gennaro |
| MF | 10 | Salvatore Bagni |
| MF | 13 | Fernando De Napoli |
| MF | 16 | Bruno Conti | | (substituted off) 65' |
| FW | 19 | Giuseppe Galderisi |
| FW | 18 | Alessandro Altobelli |
Substitutions:
| GK | 12 | Franco Tancredi |
| DF | 4 | Fulvio Collovati |
| MF | 11 | Giuseppe Baresi |
| MF | 15 | Marco Tardelli |
| FW | 17 | Gianluca Vialli | | (substituted on) 65' |
Manager:
(Italy) Enzo Bearzot

Assistant referees:
Chris Bambridge (Australia)
Siegfried Kirschen (East Germany)

=== Argentina vs South Korea ===
2 June 1986
12:00 CST

| Argentina | 3–1 | South Korea |
|---|---|---|
| Valdano 6', 46'; Ruggeri 18' | | Park Chang-Sun 73' |

Estadio Olímpico Universitario, Mexico City
Attendance: 60,000
Referee: Victoriano Sánchez Arminio (Spain)

| Argentina | South Korea |

| GK | 18 | Nery Pumpido |
| SW | 5 | José Luis Brown |
| CB | 8 | Néstor Clausen |
| CB | 19 | Oscar Ruggeri |
| DM | 14 | Ricardo Giusti |
| DM | 2 | Sergio Batista | (substituted off) 75' |
| AM | 7 | Jorge Burruchaga |
| LWB | 13 | Oscar Garré |
| SS | 10 | Diego Maradona (c) |
| CF | 17 | Pedro Pasculli | (substituted off) 74' |
| CF | 11 | Jorge Valdano |
Substitutions:
| MF | 20 | Carlos Daniel Tapia | (substituted on) 74' |
| MF | 16 | Julio Olarticoechea | (substituted on) 75' |
Manager:
(Argentina) Carlos Bilardo

| GK | 21 | Oh Yun-Kyo |
| DF | 2 | Park Kyung-Hoon |
| DF | 5 | Chung Yong-Hwan |
| DF | 12 | Kim Pyung-Seok | | (substituted off) 23' |
| DF | 14 | Cho Min-Kook |
| DF | 20 | Kim Yong-Se | | (substituted off) 46' |
| MF | 17 | Huh Jung-Moo | (yellow card) 44' |
| MF | 16 | Kim Joo-Sung |
| MF | 10 | Park Chang-Sun (c) | (yellow card) 50' |
| FW | 9 | Choi Soon-Ho |
| FW | 11 | Cha Bum-Kun |
Substitutions:
| MF | 4 | Cho Kwang-Rae | | (substituted on) 23' |
| FW | 19 | Byun Byung-Joo | | (substituted on) 46' |
Manager:
(South Korea) Kim Jung-Nam

Assistant referees:
Jesús Díaz (Colombia)
Gabriel González (Paraguay)

=== Italy vs Argentina ===
5 June 1986
12:00 CST

| Italy | 1–1 | Argentina |
|---|---|---|
| Altobelli 6' (pen.) | | Maradona 34' |

Estadio Cuauhtémoc, Puebla
Attendance: 32,000
Referee: Jan Keizer (Netherlands)

| Italy | Argentina |

| GK | 1 | Giovanni Galli |
| RB | 2 | Giuseppe Bergomi | (yellow card) 54' |
| CB | 6 | Gaetano Scirea (c) |
| CB | 8 | Pietro Vierchowod |
| LB | 3 | Antonio Cabrini |
| MF | 14 | Antonio Di Gennaro |
| MF | 10 | Salvatore Bagni |
| MF | 13 | Fernando De Napoli | | (substituted off) 87' |
| MF | 16 | Bruno Conti | | (substituted off) 65' |
| FW | 19 | Giuseppe Galderisi |
| FW | 18 | Alessandro Altobelli |
Substitutions:
| FW | 17 | Gianluca Vialli | | (substituted on) 65' |
| MF | 11 | Giuseppe Baresi | | (substituted on) 87' |
Manager:
(Italy) Enzo Bearzot

| GK | 18 | Nery Pumpido |
| SW | 5 | José Luis Brown |
| CB | 19 | Oscar Ruggeri |
| CB | 9 | José Luis Cuciuffo |
| DM | 14 | Ricardo Giusti | (yellow card) 58' |
| DM | 2 | Sergio Batista | | (substituted off) 59' |
| AM | 7 | Jorge Burruchaga |
| LWB | 13 | Oscar Garré | (yellow card) 65' |
| SS | 10 | Diego Maradona (c) |
| CF | 4 | Claudio Borghi | | (substituted off) 74' |
| CF | 11 | Jorge Valdano |
Substitutions:
| MF | 16 | Julio Olarticoechea | | (substituted on) 59' |
| MF | 12 | Héctor Enrique | | (substituted on) 74' |
Manager:
(Argentina) Carlos Bilardo

Assistant referees:
Alan Snoddy (Northern Ireland)
Antonio Marquez Ramirez (Mexico)

=== South Korea vs Bulgaria ===
5 June 1986
16:00 CST

| South Korea | 1–1 | Bulgaria |
|---|---|---|
| Kim Jong-Boo 70' | | Getov 11' |

Estadio Olímpico Universitario, Mexico City
Attendance: 45,000
Referee: Fallaj Al Shanar (Saudi Arabia)

| South Korea | Bulgaria |

| GK | 21 | Oh Yun-Kyo |
| DF | 2 | Park Kyung-Hoon |
| DF | 5 | Chung Yong-Hwan |
| DF | 8 | Cho Young-Jeung | (yellow card) 60' |
| MF | 13 | Noh Soo-Jin | | (substituted off) 46' |
| MF | 4 | Cho Kwang-Rae | | (substituted off) 72' |
| MF | 17 | Huh Jung-Moo |
| MF | 16 | Kim Joo-Sung | (yellow card) 31' |
| MF | 10 | Park Chang-Sun (c) |
| FW | 19 | Byun Byung-Joo |
| FW | 11 | Cha Bum-Kun |
Substitutions:
| FW | 7 | Kim Jong-Boo | | (substituted on) 46' |
| DF | 14 | Cho Min-Kook | | (substituted on) 72' |
Manager:
(South Korea) Kim Jung-Nam

| GK | 1 | Borislav Mihaylov |
| DF | 3 | Nikolay Arabov |
| DF | 5 | Georgi Dimitrov (c) |
| DF | 4 | Petar Petrov |
| MF | 11 | Plamen Getov | | (substituted off) 58' |
| MF | 10 | Zhivko Gospodinov | (yellow card) 49' |
| MF | 8 | Ayan Sadakov |
| MF | 12 | Radoslav Zdravkov |
| MF | 2 | Nasko Sirakov |
| FW | 7 | Bozhidar Iskrenov | | (substituted off) 46' |
| FW | 9 | Stoycho Mladenov |
Substitutions:
| FW | 20 | Kostadin Kostadinov | | (substituted on) 46' |
| MF | 6 | Andrey Zhelyazkov | | (substituted on) 58' |
Manager:
(Bulgaria) Ivan Vutsov

Assistant referees:
Valeri Butenko (Soviet Union)
Ioan Igna (Romania)

=== South Korea vs Italy ===
10 June 1986
12:00 CST

| South Korea | 2–3 | Italy |
|---|---|---|
| Choi Soon-Ho 62'; Huh Jung-Moo 89' | | Altobelli 17', 73'; Cho Kwang-Rae 82' (o.g.) |

Estadio Cuauhtémoc, Puebla
Attendance: 20,000
Referee: David Socha (United States)

| South Korea | Italy |

| GK | 21 | Oh Yun-Kyo |
| DF | 2 | Park Kyung-Hoon | (yellow card) 35' |
| DF | 5 | Chung Yong-Hwan |
| DF | 8 | Cho Young-Jeung |
| MF | 4 | Cho Kwang-Rae |
| MF | 17 | Huh Jung-Moo |
| MF | 16 | Kim Joo-Sung | (yellow card) 17' | (substituted off) 46' |
| MF | 10 | Park Chang-Sun (c) |
| FW | 9 | Choi Soon-Ho |
| FW | 19 | Byun Byung-Joo | | (substituted off) 70' |
| FW | 11 | Cha Bum-Kun |
Substitutions:
| GK | 1 | Cho Byung-deuk |
| DF | 3 | Chung Jong-Soo | (yellow card) 72' | (substituted on) 46' |
| FW | 6 | Lee Tae-ho |
| FW | 7 | Kim Jong-Boo | | (substituted on) 70' |
| FW | 20 | Kim Yong-se |
Manager:
(South Korea) Kim Jung-Nam

| GK | 1 | Giovanni Galli |
| RB | 4 | Fulvio Collovati |
| CB | 6 | Gaetano Scirea (c) | (yellow card) 65' |
| CB | 8 | Pietro Vierchowod | (yellow card) 70' |
| LB | 3 | Antonio Cabrini |
| MF | 14 | Antonio Di Gennaro |
| MF | 10 | Salvatore Bagni | (yellow card) 31' | (substituted off) 67' |
| MF | 13 | Fernando De Napoli |
| MF | 16 | Bruno Conti |
| FW | 19 | Giuseppe Galderisi | | (substituted off) 88' |
| FW | 18 | Alessandro Altobelli |
Substitutions:
| GK | 12 | Franco Tancredi |
| DF | 5 | Sebastiano Nela |
| MF | 11 | Giuseppe Baresi | | (substituted on) 67' |
| FW | 17 | Gianluca Vialli | | (substituted on) 88' |
| FW | 21 | Aldo Serena |
Manager:
(Italy) Enzo Bearzot

=== Argentina vs Bulgaria ===
10 June 1986
12:00 CST

| Argentina | 2–0 | Bulgaria |
|---|---|---|
| Valdano 4'; Burruchaga 77' |

Estadio Olímpico Universitario, Mexico City
Attendance: 65,000
Referee: Berny Ulloa Morera (Costa Rica)

| Argentina | Bulgaria |

| GK | 18 | Nery Pumpido |
| SW | 5 | José Luis Brown |
| CB | 19 | Oscar Ruggeri |
| CB | 9 | José Luis Cuciuffo | (yellow card) 25' |
| DM | 14 | Ricardo Giusti |
| DM | 2 | Sergio Batista | | (substituted off) 46' |
| AM | 7 | Jorge Burruchaga |
| LWB | 13 | Oscar Garré |
| SS | 10 | Diego Maradona (c) |
| CF | 4 | Claudio Borghi | | (substituted off) 46' |
| CF | 11 | Jorge Valdano |
Substitutions:
| MF | 16 | Julio Olarticoechea | | (substituted on) 46' |
| MF | 12 | Héctor Enrique | | (substituted on) 46' |
Manager:
(Argentina) Carlos Bilardo

| GK | 1 | Borislav Mihaylov |
| DF | 4 | Petar Petrov |
| DF | 5 | Georgi Dimitrov (c) |
| MF | 11 | Plamen Getov |
| MF | 15 | Georgi Yordanov |
| MF | 6 | Andrey Zhelyazkov |
| MF | 8 | Ayan Sadakov |
| MF | 13 | Aleksandar Markov |
| MF | 2 | Nasko Sirakov | (substituted off) 71' |
| FW | 14 | Plamen Markov |
| FW | 9 | Stoycho Mladenov | (substituted off) 52' |
Substitutions:
| FW | 18 | Boycho Velichkov | (substituted on) 52' |
| MF | 12 | Radoslav Zdravkov | (substituted on) 71' |
Manager:
(Bulgaria) Ivan Vutsov

== See also ==
- Argentina at the FIFA World Cup
- Bulgaria at the FIFA World Cup
- Italy at the FIFA World Cup
- South Korea at the FIFA World Cup
