= Arabov =

Arabov (Bulgarian: Арабов, Russian: Арабов) is a Slavic masculine surname, its feminine counterpart is Arabova. It may refer to

- Jacob Arabo (born Arabov), Bukharian-American jeweler
- Nikolay Arabov (born 1953), Bulgarian football player
- Yekaterina Arabova (born 1983), Sport shooter from Turkmenistan
- Yuri Arabov (born 1954), Russian screenwriter, writer, poet and educator
