= Todor Kolev (footballer, born 1942) =

Bulgarian footballer

Personal information
- Full name: Todor Petkov Kolev
- Date of birth: 29 April 1942 (age 84)
- Place of birth: Harmanli, Bulgaria
- Position: Defender

Senior career*
Years	Team	Apps	(Gls)
1962–1965	CSKA Sofia	18	(3)
1965–1966	Botev Vratsa	25	(0)
1966–1968	Lokomotiv Sofia	75	(8)
1969–1971	Slavia Sofia	42	(3)
1971–1975	Lokomotiv Sofia	89	(5)
Total		249	(19)

International career
1967–1970	Bulgaria	11	(1)
- * Club domestic league appearances and goals

Todor Petkov Kolev (Bulgarian: Toдoр Пeтков Кoлeв; born 29 April 1942) is a Bulgarian former football defender who played for Bulgaria in the 1970 FIFA World Cup. He also played for PFC Slavia Sofia.
