= 1993–94 A Group =

46th completed season of top-tier football league in Bulgaria

A Group
- Season: 1993–94
- Dates: 14 August 1993 – 8 May 1994
- Champions: Levski Sofia (19th title)
- Relegated: Chernomorets; Cherno More; Spartak Varna
- UEFA Cup: Levski Sofia; CSKA Sofia; Shumen
- Matches: 218
- Goals: 589 (2.7 per match)
- Top goalscorer: Nasko Sirakov (30 goals)

The 1993–94 A Group was the 46th season of the A Football Group, the top Bulgarian professional league for association football clubs, since its establishment in 1948.

== Overview ==
It was contested by 16 teams, and Levski Sofia won the championship with a record 17 points difference before the second.

== Team information ==
=== Stadia and locations ===
The following teams have ensured their participation in A Group for season 1993–94 (listed in alphabetical order):

Location of teams in 1993–94 A Group
Sofia 1993–94 A Group football clubs

Team	City	Stadium	Capacity
Beroe	Stara Zagora	Beroe	16,000
Botev	Plovdiv	Hristo Botev	18,000
Cherno More	Varna	Ticha	8,250
Chernomorets	Burgas	Chernomorets	22,000
CSKA	Sofia	Bulgarian Army	22,995
Dobrudzha	Dobrich	Druzhba	12,500
Etar	Veliko Tarnovo	Ivaylo	18,000
Levski	Sofia	Georgi Asparuhov	29,986
Lokomotiv	Gorna Oryahovitsa	Dimitar Dyulgerov	14,000
Lokomotiv	Plovdiv	Lokomotiv	24,000
Lokomotiv	Sofia	Lokomotiv	22,000
Pirin	Blagoevgrad	Hristo Botev	15,000
Shumen	Shumen	Panayot Volov	24,000
Slavia	Sofia	Ovcha Kupel	18,000
Spartak	Varna	Spartak	8,000
Yantra	Gabrovo	Hristo Botev	12,000

== League standings ==
Pos	Team	Pld	W	D	L	GF	GA	GD	Pts	Qualification or relegation
1	Levski Sofia (C)	28	22	5	1	78	17	+61	71	Qualification for UEFA Cup preliminary round
2	CSKA Sofia	28	17	3	8	58	27	+31	54	Qualification for UEFA Cup preliminary round
3	Botev Plovdiv (Note: Botev Plovdiv is banned from European Competitions for one season. Its place in the UEFA Cup is taken by Shumen.)	28	15	5	8	50	29	+21	50	
4	Shumen	28	14	6	8	49	34	+15	48	Qualification for UEFA Cup preliminary round
5	Lokomotiv Plovdiv	28	12	4	12	38	43	−5	40	
6	Etar Veliko Tarnovo	28	10	10	8	42	33	+9	40	
7	Beroe Stara Zagora	28	11	5	12	33	38	−5	38	
8	Lokomotiv G. Oryahovitsa	28	11	5	12	25	39	−14	38	
9	Slavia Sofia	28	9	9	10	30	37	−7	36	
10	Pirin Blagoevgrad	28	10	6	12	35	36	−1	36	Qualification for Cup Winners' Cup qualifying round (Note: Pirin Blagoevgrad qualified for the Cup Winners' Cup as finalists in the 1993–94 Bulgarian Cup.)
11	Lokomotiv Sofia	28	10	4	14	37	40	−3	34	
12	Dobrudzha Dobrich	28	8	10	10	37	42	−5	34	
13	Chernomorets Burgas (R)	28	8	6	14	30	36	−6	30	Relegation to 1994–95 B Group
14	Cherno More (R)	28	5	6	17	24	68	−44	21	Relegation to 1994–95 B Group
15	Spartak Varna (R)	28	4	4	20	18	65	−47	16	Relegation to 1994–95 B Group
–	Yantra Gabrovo (Note: Yantra Gabrovo was relegated from the group after round 8 for trying to bribe Beroe Stara Zagora in their round 8 match. All their results were annulled.) (R)	8	1	0	7	5	18	−13	0	Relegation to 1994–95 B Group

Source: rsssf.com
(C) Champions; (R) Relegated

== Results ==
Home \ Away	BSZ	BOT	CHM	CHB	CSK	DOB	ETA	LEV	LGO	LPL	LSO	PIR	SHU	SLA	SPV
Beroe Stara Zagora		1–0	3–3	1–0	0–2	4–1	1–1	1–2	2–0	2–0	2–1	1–1	0–2	0–2	1–0
Botev Plovdiv	0–2		4–0	1–0	2–1	2–2	2–0	1–0	1–1	1–2	3–2	1–0	4–2	6–0	6–1
Cherno More	1–3	0–3		0–0	0–3	1–0	1–1	0–5	1–0	2–1	0–2	2–0	0–0	0–0	1–2
Chernomorets Burgas	1–1	2–2	3–0		2–2	1–1	1–0	0–1	3–0	3–0	2–1	1–0	3–3	1–0	1–0
CSKA Sofia	3–0	2–1	6–1	4–1		3–0	2–1	1–4	0–1	6–0	1–0	4–1	2–1	3–1	7–0
Dobrudzha Dobrich	3–1	0–0	3–0	3–0	1–1		4–1	2–2	3–2	2–0	4–3	1–1	1–2	0–0	2–0
Etar Veliko Tarnovo	5–2	3–0	0–2	3–2	2–0	1–1		2–2	5–2	1–1	0–0	3–0	2–0	1–1	3–1
Levski Sofia	2–0	2–0	5–1	1–0	2–1	5–0	1–0		6–0	2–0	6–0	4–3	1–1	4–1	5–0
Lokomotiv G. Oryahovitsa	0–1	0–0	3–1	1–0	1–0	2–0	0–0	0–0		1–0	2–0	2–0	1–0	2–0	1–0
Lokomotiv Plovdiv	2–1	1–3	4–2	4–2	0–0	2–1	2–1	1–1	1–0		1–0	2–1	4–0	1–2	3–0
Lokomotiv Sofia	1–0	0–1	5–0	1–0	0–1	3–1	1–3	0–4	2–0	1–0		1–3	3–1	0–0	7–0
Pirin Blagoevgrad	1–1	2–0	2–0	1–0	3–0	2–0	2–0	0–3	3–0	1–2	1–1		2–2	2–1	3–0
Shumen	2–0	2–0	4–1	1–0	2–1	3–1	1–1	1–3	4–0	3–1	3–0	2–0		1–1	3–0
Slavia Sofia	2–1	1–3	4–2	2–0	0–1	0–0	1–1	1–3	3–0	2–2	0–0	2–0	1–0		2–0
Spartak Varna	0–1	0–3	2–2	2–1	0–1	0–0	0–1	0–2	3–3	2–1	1–2	0–0	1–3	3–0	

Source: A PFG (in Bulgarian)
Legend: Blue = home team win; Yellow = draw; Red = away team win.

== Champions ==
Levski Sofia

Goalkeepers
(Bulgaria) Plamen Nikolov	24	(0)
(Ukraine) Oleg Morgun	6	(0)

Defenders
(Bulgaria) Valentin Dartilov	12	(0)
(Bulgaria) Gosho Ginchev	23	(1)
(Bulgaria) Krasimir Koev	3	(0)
(Bulgaria) Tsanko Tsvetanov	25	(0)
(Bulgaria) Petar Hubchev*	13	(1)
(Bulgaria) Stoil Georgiev	2	(0)
(Bulgaria) Aleksandar Markov	19	(0)
(Bulgaria) Emil Kremenliev	25	(1)

Midfielders
(Bulgaria) Daniel Borimirov	23	(15)
(Bulgaria) Georgi Slavchev	16	(1)
(Egypt) Magdy Tolba	5	(0)
(Bulgaria) Ilian Iliev	7	(0)
(Bulgaria) Zlatko Yankov	24	(5)
(Bulgaria) Emil Mitsanski	4	(0)
(Bulgaria) Nikolay Todorov	27	(7)
(Bulgaria) Georgi Ivanov	24	(0)
(Bulgaria) Nikolay Kostov	2	(0)
(Bulgaria) Diyan Angelov	13	(1)
(Bulgaria) Veselin Sarbakov	1	(0)

Forwards
(Romania) Petre Grigoraș	10	(4)
(Bulgaria) Petar Aleksandrov	12	(10)
(Bulgaria) Nikolay Nikolov	2	(0)
(Bulgaria) Aleksandar Bonchev	4	(0)
(Bulgaria) Dimitar Trendafilov	12	(1)
(Bulgaria) Nasko Sirakov	26	(30)

Manager
(Bulgaria) Georgi Vasilev

- Hubchev left the club during a season.

== Top scorers ==
Rank	Scorer	Club	Goals
1	(Bulgaria) Nasko Sirakov	Levski Sofia	30
2	(Bulgaria) Ivaylo Andonov	CSKA Sofia	25
3	(Bulgaria) Plamen Getov	Shumen	18
4	(Bulgaria) Daniel Borimirov	Levski Sofia	15
5	(Bulgaria) Simeon Chilibonov	Dobrudzha (9); Slavia Sofia (5)	14
6	(Ukraine) Igor Kislov	Etar	12
7	(Bulgaria) Boris Hvoynev	Botev Plovdiv	11
8	(Bulgaria) Petar Aleksandrov	Levski Sofia	10
8	(Romania) Petre Grigoraș	Lokomotiv Plovdiv (6); Levski Sofia (4)	10
8	(Federal Republic of Yugoslavia) Vojislav Budimirović	Lokomotiv Plovdiv	10
8	(Bulgaria) Blago Aleksandrov	Slavia Sofia	10

- Source:1993–94 Top Goalscorers

== Attendances ==
#	Club	Average
1	Levski	17,133
2	Shumen	12,154
3	Botev	10,500
4	Dobrudzha	9,600
5	Lokomotiv Plovdiv	9,033
6	CSKA Sofia	8,042
7	Pirin	7,231
8	Chernomorets	6,771
9	Cherno More	5,087
10	Beroe	4,912
11	Lokomotiv Sofia	4,875
12	Etar	4,842
13	Slavia Sofia	4,832
14	Spartak Varna	3,767
15	Lokomotiv GO	3,271
16	Yantra	1,500
