= Nasko Sirakov =

Bulgarian footballer

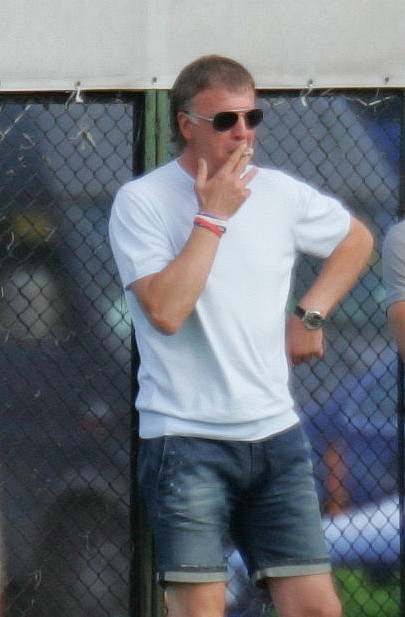
- Sirakov in 2013

Personal information
- Full name: Nasko Petkov Sirakov
- Date of birth: 26 April 1962 (age 64)
- Place of birth: Stara Zagora, Bulgaria
- Height: 1.86 m (6 ft 1 in)
- Position: Striker

Youth career
- 1975–1980: Levski Sofia

Senior career*
Years	Team	Apps	(Gls)
1980	Levski Sofia	3	(0)
1980–1981	Spartak Varna	21	(4)
1981–1982	Haskovo	35	(8)
1983–1988	Levski Sofia	131	(89)
1988–1990	Zaragoza	41	(10)
1990–1991	Espanyol	24	(3)
1991–1992	Levski Sofia	27	(26)
1992	Lens	11	(3)
1993–1994	Levski Sofia	57	(51)
1995	Botev Plovdiv	20	(4)
1995–1998	Slavia Sofia	36	(19)
Total		406	(217)

International career
1983–1996	Bulgaria	78	(24)
- * Club domestic league appearances and goals

Nasko Petkov Sirakov (Bulgarian: Наско Петков Сираков; born 26 April 1962) is a Bulgarian retired professional footballer who played mainly as a striker. He is the current president of Levski Sofia.

Part of the Bulgaria national team at the 1994 FIFA World Cup as it finished fourth, he was one of the most important footballers in the country in the 1980s and 1990s, representing Levski Sofia in four separate spells.

Having surpassed the 200-goal mark as a professional – he was crowned the country's top division topscorer four times – Sirakov also worked with his main club in directorial capacities.

== Club career ==
Born in Stara Zagora, the son of professional wrestler Petko Sirakov, Nasko started playing as a striker, playing three games for Levski Sofia's first team in 1980, having joined the club's youth system at the age of 13. In the following years, he developed his game with Spartak Varna and lowly Haskovo, returning to Levski after two seasons (he also played briefly for the latter club in the 1982–83 season).

In his second stint at Levski, Sirakov began appearing regularly, scoring 14 goals in only 19 matches in 1984–85 A Group, as the team won the league. From 1986–88, with the club now renamed Vitosha, he helped to another championship, as well as leading the goal charts in both seasons, scoring 64 goals combined – 36 in just 30 matches in the first year, although the championship was eventually lost to CSKA Sofia, by three points. During this spell, he also won two Bulgarian Cups with the club.

Sirakov moved abroad for the first time in 1988, playing for the following three years in La Liga, with Real Zaragoza and RCD Español. Subsequently, he returned to Levski: in the first season upon his return, he netted 26 times in 27 matches, but the club again lost to CSKA.

In the summer of 1992, the 30-year-old Sirakov signed with Ligue 1 club RC Lens, but returned to his main club in the following transfer window, helping it to three consecutive league wins, whilst being crowned the competition's top scorer on another two occasions. He finished the 1994–95 season with Botev Plovdiv, still contributing decisively in Levski's championship win, scoring 12 in only 10 matches.

Sirakov closed his career at the age of 36, after three years with Slavia Sofia, winning a double in 1995–96 season. During his career in his country, he amassed totals of 294 matches and 196 goals in the top division, the second best achievement after Petar Zhekov; only with his main club, Levski, he scored 165 times in 205 games, a club record.

Sirakov briefly managed Slavia Sofia in 1997. In the following decade, he worked as director of football for Levski, being fired on 7 May 2008, and being succeeded by former club and national teammate Daniel Borimirov.

== International career ==
Sirakov was also a regular for Bulgaria during 13 years, making his debut on 7 August 1983, against Algeria.

He represented the nation at the 1986 FIFA World Cup in Mexico – scoring against Italy in the group stage (1–1) and helping the national team to the round of 16 – and at the 1994 World Cup in the United States: during the latter, as Bulgaria finished in a best-ever fourth position, he played in all the matches, scoring against Argentina for a 2–0 group stage win, also earning penalties against Greece and in the semifinal loss against Italy.

Aged 34, Sirakov was also picked for UEFA Euro 1996 in England, playing the last of his 78 matches (24 goals) on 13 June, against Romania, after replacing Lyuboslav Penev in a 1–0 win. Immediately after retiring from international play, Sirakov served as assistant to the national team, appearing with it at the 1998 World Cup.

== Personal life ==
Sirakov is married to Iliana Raeva, a distinguished Bulgarian rhythmic gymnast. They have two daughters, named Slaveya and Violeta. His father, the wrestler Petko Sirakov, was the first world champion from Bulgaria.

== Career statistics ==
=== International ===
Appearances and goals by national team and year
National team	Year	Apps	Goals
Bulgaria	1983	5	1
Bulgaria	1984	3	1
Bulgaria	1985	6	1
Bulgaria	1986	11	5
Bulgaria	1987	6	3
Bulgaria	1988	4	1
Bulgaria	1989	0	0
Bulgaria	1990	2	1
Bulgaria	1991	5	3
Bulgaria	1992	7	2
Bulgaria	1993	4	2
Bulgaria	1994	13	2
Bulgaria	1995	7	1
Bulgaria	1996	5	1
Total		78	24

Scores and results list Bulgaria's goal tally first, score column indicates score after each Sirakov goal.

List of international goals scored by Nasko Sirakov
No.	Date	Venue	Opponent	Score	Result	Competition
1	7 September 1983	Ullevaal Stadion, Oslo, Norway	Norway	2–1	2–1	Euro 1984 qualification
2	5 December 1984	Vasil Levski National Stadium, Sofia	Luxembourg	1–0	4–0	1986 World Cup qualification
3	2 May 1985	Vasil Levski National Stadium, Sofia, Bulgaria	France	2–0	2–0	1986 World Cup qualification
4	9 April 1986	Vasil Levski National Stadium, Sofia, Bulgaria	Denmark	1–0	3–0	Friendly
5	9 April 1986	Vasil Levski National Stadium, Sofia, Bulgaria	Denmark	2–0	3–0	Friendly
6	31 May 1986	Estadio Azteca, Mexico City, Mexico	Italy	1–1	1–1	1986 World Cup
7	29 October 1986	Stade El Menzah, Tunis, Tunisia	Tunisia	2–3	3–3	Friendly
8	29 October 1986	Stade El Menzah, Tunis, Tunisia	Tunisia	3–3	3–3	Friendly
9	30 April 1987	Stade Municipal, Luxembourg City, Luxembourg	Luxembourg	2–0	4–1	Euro 1988 qualification
10	20 May 1987	Vasil Levski National Stadium, Sofia, Bulgaria	Luxembourg	1–0	3–0	Euro 1988 qualification
11	23 September 1987	Vasil Levski National Stadium, Sofia, Bulgaria	Belgium	1–0	2–0	Euro 1988 qualification
12	23 March 1988	Vasil Levski National Stadium, Sofia, Bulgaria	Czechoslovakia	1–0	2–0	Friendly
13	17 October 1990	Stadionul Steaua, Bucharest, Romania	Romania	1–0	3–0	Euro 1992 qualification
14	1 May 1991	Vasil Levski National Stadium, Sofia, Bulgaria	Switzerland	2–0	2–3	Euro 1992 qualification
15	22 May 1991	San Marino Stadium, Serravalle, San Marino	San Marino	2–0	3–0	Euro 1992 qualification
16	20 November 1991	Vasil Levski National Stadium, Sofia, Bulgaria	Romania	1–1	1–1	Euro 1992 qualification
17	28 April 1992	Wankdorf Stadium, Bern, Switzerland	Switzerland	1–0	2–0	Friendly
18	2 December 1992	Ramat Gan Stadium, Ramat Gan, Israel	Israel	1–0	2–0	1994 World Cup qualification
19	20 February 1993	Dubai, United Arab Emirates	United Arab Emirates	1–0	3–1	Friendly
20	12 May 1993	Vasil Levski National Stadium, Sofia, Bulgaria	Israel	2–2	2–2	1994 World Cup qualification
21	3 June 1994	Vasil Levski National Stadium, Sofia, Bulgaria	Ukraine	1–0	1–1	Friendly
22	30 June 1994	Cotton Bowl, Dallas, U.S.	Argentina	2–0	2–0	1994 World Cup
23	14 February 1995	Estadio Malvinas Argentinas, Mendoza, Argentina	Argentina	1–2	1–4	Friendly
24	2 June 1996	Vasil Levski National Stadium, Sofia, Bulgaria	United Arab Emirates	4–1	4–1	Friendly

== Honours ==
Levski Sofia

- A Group: 1983–84, 1984–85, 1987–88, 1992–93, 1993–94
- Bulgarian Cup: 1983–84, 1985–86, 1991–92, 1993–94
- Cup of the Soviet Army: 1983–84, 1986–87, 1987–88

Slavia Sofia

- A Group: 1995–96
- Bulgarian Cup: 1995–96

Bulgaria

- FIFA World Cup: fourth place 1994

Individual

- A Group top scorer: 1986–87 (36 goals), 1987–88 (28 goals), 1991–92 (26 goals), 1993–94 (30 goals)
- European Golden Shoe third place: 1986–87
