= Ilian Iliev =

Bulgarian footballer

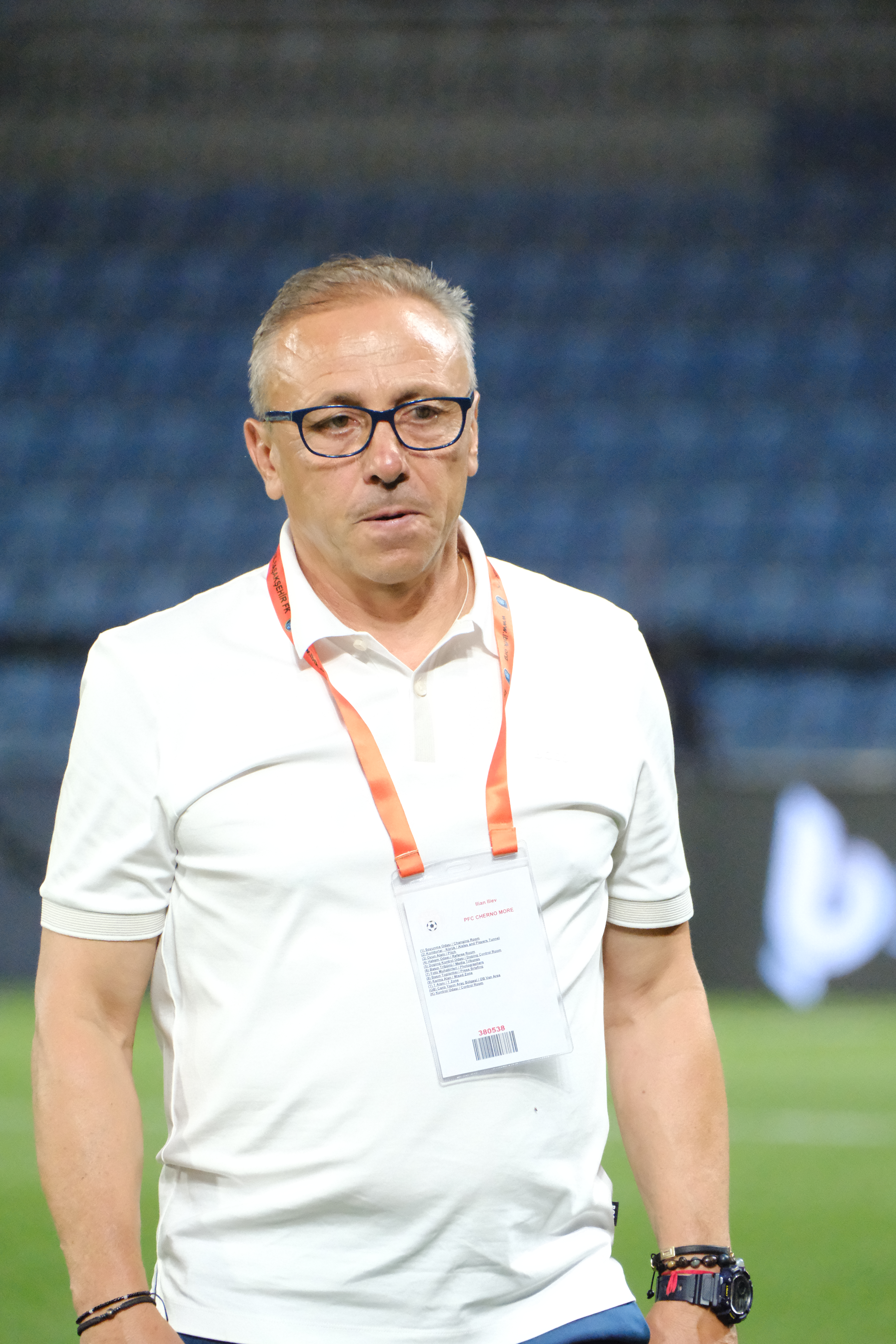
- Iliev in 2025

Personal information
- Full name: Ilian Dimov Iliev
- Date of birth: 2 July 1968 (age 58)
- Place of birth: Varna, Bulgaria
- Height: 1.73 m (5 ft 8 in)
- Position: Attacking midfielder

Team information
- Current team: Cherno More (manager)

Youth career
- 1979–1986: Cherno More

Senior career*
Years	Team	Apps	(Gls)
1988–1991	Cherno More	75	(18)
1991–1995	Levski Sofia	85	(19)
1993–1994	→ Altay (loan)	12	(2)
1995–1997	Benfica	40	(4)
1997	Slavia Sofia	11	(1)
1998	Bursaspor	15	(3)
1998	AEK Athens	8	(0)
1999	Levski Sofia	11	(0)
1999–2002	Marítimo	76	(6)
2002–2003	Salgueiros	24	(0)
2003–2004	Cherno More	18	(2)
Total		375	(55)

International career
1991–2000	Bulgaria	34	(3)

Managerial career
- 2004–2006: Cherno More
- 2006–2007: Beroe
- 2008–2012: Beroe
- 2012–2013: Levski Sofia
- 2014–2015: Interclube
- 2016: Lokomotiv Plovdiv
- 2017: Vereya
- 2018–: Cherno More
- 2023–2025: Bulgaria
- * Club domestic league appearances and goals

Ilian Dimov Iliev (Bulgarian: Илиан Димов Илиев; born 2 July 1968) is a Bulgarian professional football manager and former player. He is the head coach at Bulgarian First League club Cherno More.

He is best known for having played for Portuguese club Benfica and Bulgarian sides Cherno More and Levski Sofia. In his professional career as a footballer, he received 34 international caps for the Bulgaria national team.

== Club career ==
Iliev was born in Varna and started to play football at his hometown club Cherno More. In his youth he was also a talented wrestler, but chose to dedicate himself to football. After his good performances in the Cherno More youth teams were caught, he was promoted into the first team in 1986. For five seasons, between 1986 and 1991, Iliev made 123 appearances and scored 31 goals for the club. He was transferred to Levski Sofia in the 1991–92 season, winning three times the Bulgarian A PFG and one Bulgarian Cup in five years with the club.

In 1995, Iliev moved to Benfica and won the Taça de Portugal in the 1995–96 season. In his career he also played for Slavia Sofia and the Turkish Bursaspor

On 31 July 1998 Iliev was transferred to the Greek side AEK Athens for a fee of 300 million drachmas. He failed to establish himself in the squad and on 31 December his contract was terminated and returned to Levski Sofia. Afterwards he played the Portuguese clubs Marítimo and Salgueiros. He finished his career at his first club Cherno More Varna in 2004.

== International career ==
Iliev made his debut for the Bulgaria national team on 21 August 1991 in a friendly against Turkey. He came on as a substitute for Yordan Lechkov in the 62nd minute, and the match ended in a 0–0 draw.

He was a member of the Bulgarian national team during the 1998 FIFA World Cup qualification, which took place from 1996 to 1998. On 14 December 1996, he scored his first international goal in a qualifying match against Cyprus, helping Bulgaria secure a 3–1 victory.

Iliev represented Bulgaria at the 1998 FIFA World Cup in France. He started the opening group-stage match against Paraguay, playing for 78 minutes, and also started the second match against Nigeria, playing for 67 minutes. He also featured until the 45th minute of the second half in the final group match against Spain. Bulgaria drew 0–0 with Paraguay but lost 0–1 to Nigeria and 1–6 to Spain, resulting in their elimination in the group stage.

On 3 March 1999, Iliev scored in a friendly against Slovakia, as Bulgaria won 2–0. On 16 August 2000, he also scored in a friendly against Belgium, although Bulgaria lost the match 1–3.

== Managerial career ==
After retiring in 2004, Iliev pursued a career as a manager. In June 2004, he was appointed in his first club Cherno More Varna. However, on 3 March 2006, after a two years spell at the Sailors, he resigned after a home 0–1 loss against Rodopa Smolyan. Since 2006, he serves as the manager of Beroe Stara Zagora, making him one of the longest serving manager in a Bulgarian football club. Under his management in the 2009–10 season, Beroe won a historical first Bulgarian Cup and consequently achieved a participation in the UEFA Europa League qualification stages. Iliev has been voted best manager in the Bulgarian championship for the season 2009–10 by the association of Bulgarian football players.

On 6 April 2012 it was announced that Iliev will be the new manager of Levski Sofia. He was to complete the season with Beroe and then start his new job at the beginning of the 2012–13 season. His contract will be until June 2015.

On 12 April 2013, he was fired by Levski Sofia and was replaced by Nikolay Mitov.

In mid May 2014, Iliev held final talks to become the manager of Angolan club Inter Luanda. Compatriot Petar Kostadinov was announced as his assistant. He returned to his country in 2016, being appointed as manager of Loko Plovdiv. Iliev came close to securing European club football for the team, as the "smurfs" finished in 5th place in the standings during the 2015/2016 A PFG. On 17 October 2016, following a 1–2 defeat by Lokomotiv GO, Iliev announced that he is leaving Lokomotiv Plovdiv. In early 2017, Iliev signed a contract to manage newly promoted Altai Semey from the Kazakhstan Premier League, but stepped down in February 2017, as the club eventually did not receive a license for the top division.

On 9 June 2017, Iliev was appointed as manager of First League club Vereya. Following a successful stint with Vereya, in December 2017 he returned as head manager to his hometown club Cherno More.

On 1 November 2023, Iliev was officially announced as the new manager of Bulgaria while remaining in charge of his club team Cherno More. In September 2025, he left his position as head manager of the national team by mutual consent following an unsuccessful start to the 2026 World Cup qualifiers.

As of 22 September 2025, together with Dimitar Dimitrov he holds the record for the most matches as manager in the top flight of Bulgarian football - 491.

== Career statistics ==
=== Club ===
Club performance			League		Cup		Continental		Total	
Club	League	Season	Apps	Goals	Apps	Goals	Apps	Goals	Apps	Goals
Cherno More	A Group	1988–89	11	2	0	0	–		11	2
Cherno More	A Group	1989–90	29	3	5	1	–		34	4
Cherno More	B Group	1990–91	35	13	1	0	–		36	13
Cherno More	Total		75	18	6	1	0	0	81	19
Levski Sofia	A Group	1991–92	30	4	8	2	2	0	40	6
Levski Sofia	A Group	1992–93	25	4	7	1	2	0	34	5
Altay (loan)	Süper Lig	1993–94	12	2	2	1	–		14	3
Levski Sofia	A Group	1993–94	7	0	1	1	0	0	8	1
Levski Sofia	A Group	1994–95	23	11	3	1	2	0	28	12
Levski Sofia	Total		85	19	19	5	6	0	110	24
Benfica	Primeira Liga	1995–96	19	1	5	0	0	0	24	1
Benfica	Primeira Liga	1996–97	21	3	2	0	4	0	27	3
Benfica	Total		40	4	7	0	4	0	51	4
Slavia Sofia	A Group	1997–98	11	1	?	?	–		11	1
Bursaspor	Süper Lig	1997–98	15	3	2	0	–		17	3
AEK Athens	Alpha Ethniki	1998–99	8	0	?	?	2	0	10	0
Levski Sofia	A Group	1998–99	11	0	0	0	–		11	0
Marítimo	Primeira Liga	1999–00	32	4	0	0	–		32	4
Marítimo	Primeira Liga	2000–01	26	2	5	0	–		31	2
Marítimo	Primeira Liga	2001–02	18	0	6	0	2	0	26	0
Marítimo	Total		76	6	11	0	2	0	89	6
Salgueiros	Segunda Liga	2002–03	24	0	0	0	–		24	0
Cherno More	A Group	2003–04	18	2	?	?	–		18	2
Career statistics			374	55	47	7	14	0	435	62

=== International ===
Bulgaria national team
Year	Apps	Goals
1991	1	0
1992	3	0
1993	1	0
1994	0	0
1995	0	0
1996	2	1
1997	5	0
1998	9	0
1999	7	1
2000	6	1
Total	34	3

=== International goals ===
#	Date	Venue	Opponent	Score	Result	Competition
1.	14 December 1996	Tsirio Stadium, Limassol	Cyprus	3–1	3–1	World Cup 1998 Qualification
2.	3 March 1999	Stadion Beroe, Stara Zagora	Slovakia	1–0	2–0	Friendly
3.	16 August 2000	Stadion Vivacom Arena – Georgi Asparuhov, Sofia	Belgium	1–3	1–3	Friendly

== Managerial statistics ==
As of 21 November 2026

Team	From	To	Record							
Team	From	To	G	W	D	L	Win %	GF	GA	GD
(Bulgaria) Cherno More Varna	4 June 2004	4 March 2006	46	15	8	23	32.61	48	60	-12
(Bulgaria) Beroe	8 June 2006	23 March 2007	21	8	5	8	38.10	29	21	+8
(Bulgaria) Beroe	7 January 2008	4 May 2012	138	59	33	46	42.75	157	148	+9
(Bulgaria) Levski Sofia	1 June 2012	12 April 2013	27	18	4	5	66.67	52	17	+35
(Bulgaria) Loko Plovdiv	26 February 2016	17 October 2016	24	13	5	6	54.17	48	39	+9
(Bulgaria) Vereya	9 June 2017	28 December 2017	21	9	4	8	42.86	22	23	-1
(Bulgaria) Cherno More Varna	28 December 2017	present	332	142	94	96	42.77	411	329	+82
Bulgaria	1 November 2023	8 September 2025	19	3	9	7	15.79	15	31	-16
Total			628	267	162	199	42.52	783	669	+114

== Honours ==
=== Player ===
Levski Sofia

- Bulgarian League: 1992–93, 1993–94, 1994–95
- Bulgarian Cup: 1991–92, 1993–94

Benfica

- Portuguese Cup: 1995–96

=== Manager ===
Beroe

- Bulgarian Cup: 2009–10
- Bulgarian League Coach of the Season: 2009–10

Individual

Manager of the Year in Bulgarian football - 2021, 2023
