= Zlatko Yankov =

Bulgarian footballer and manager

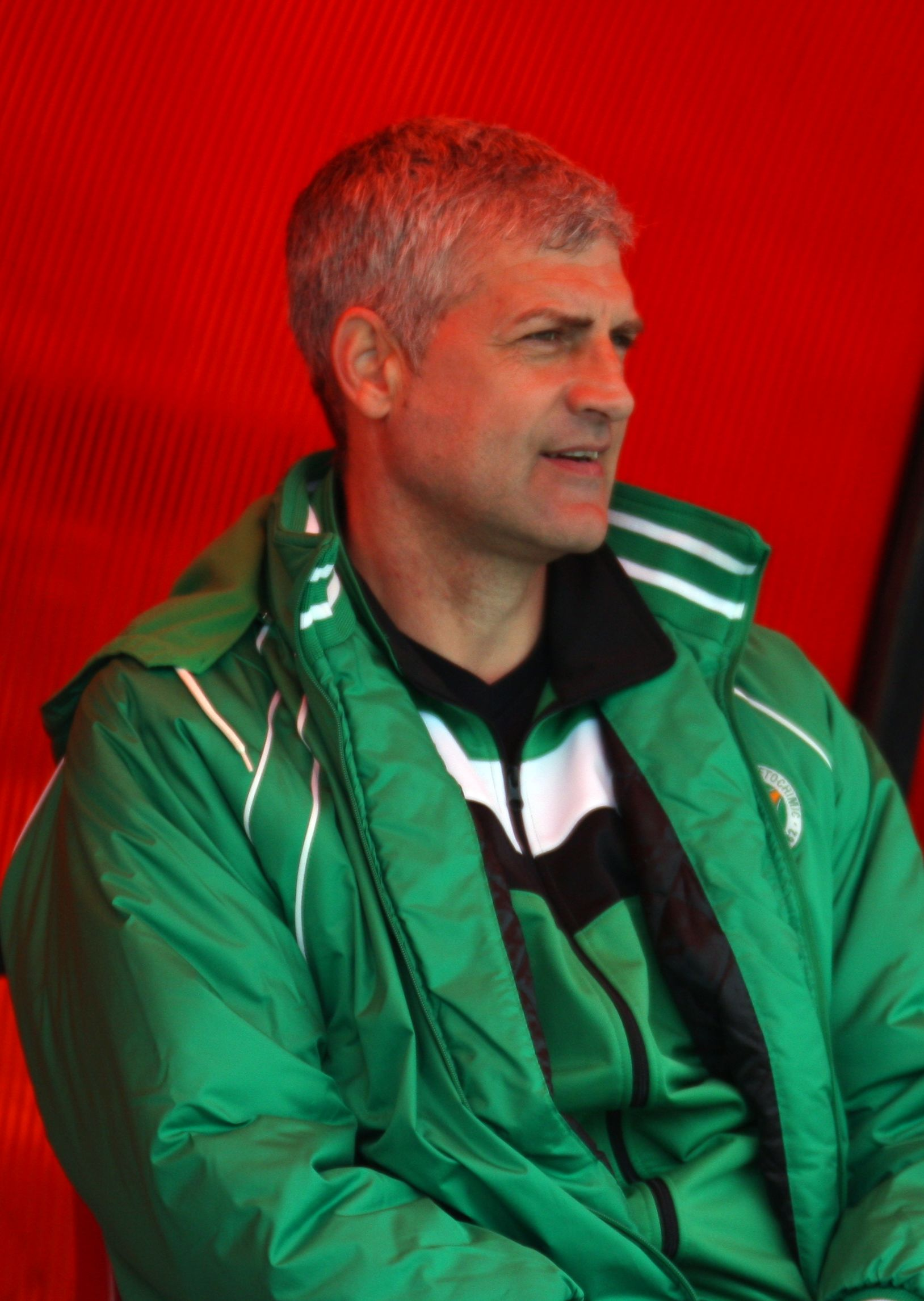
- Yankov in 2014

Personal information
- Full name: Zlatko Georgiev Yankov
- Date of birth: 7 June 1966 (age 60)
- Place of birth: Burgas, Bulgaria
- Height: 1.84 m (6 ft 0 in)
- Position: Defensive midfielder

Senior career*
Years	Team	Apps	(Gls)
1984–1987	Naftex Burgas	105	(13)
1987–1990	Chernomorets Burgas	89	(4)
1990–1992	Levski Sofia	58	(3)
1992	Real Valladolid	6	(1)
1992–1995	Levski Sofia	70	(14)
1995–1996	KFC Uerdingen	15	(1)
1996–1998	Beşiktaş	61	(3)
1998	Adanaspor	7	(1)
1999	Naftex Burgas	13	(1)
1999	Lokomotiv Sofia	7	(0)
2000	Vanspor	6	(1)
2000	Gençlerbirliği	9	(1)
2000–2001	Chernomorets Burgas	15	(3)
2001–2002	Naftex Burgas	24	(1)
Total		486	(49)

International career
1990–1999	Bulgaria	79	(4)

Managerial career
- 2005–2006: Chernomorets Burgas (managing director)
- 2008–2010: Chernomorets Burgas (sporting director)
- 2011–2012: Chernomorets Burgas (sporting director)
- 2014: Neftochimic Burgas
- 2014: Spartak Varna
- 2014: Vereya (assistant)
- 2017: Sivasspor (assistant)
- * Club domestic league appearances and goals

Zlatko Georgiev Yankov (Bulgarian: Златко Георгиев Янков; born 7 June 1966) is a Bulgarian football manager and former footballer who played as a midfielder. He played for clubs including Levski Sofia, Real Valladolid, and Beşiktaş, and represented the Bulgaria national team at the 1994 FIFA World Cup, 1998 FIFA World Cup, and UEFA Euro 1996.

Yankov contributed to Bulgaria's run to the semi-finals of the 1994 FIFA World Cup. After retiring as a player, he worked as a coach and manager at several clubs.

== Club career ==
Yankov began his professional career in 1984 with Naftex Burgas. In 1987, he moved to Chernomorets Burgas, where he played until 1990 before joining Levski Sofia. He remained with Levski Sofia until 1995, establishing himself as a key midfielder and contributing to the club's A Group and Bulgarian Cup victories. He also played in Levski Sofia's European competitions during the 1990s.

In 1992, he was loaned to Spanish club Real Valladolid, making 6 appearances and scoring 1 goal in the Segunda División. He subsequently returned to Levski Sofia, where he remained until 1995.

In 1995, he moved to German club Uerdingen 05, playing in the Bundesliga. During the 1995–96 season, he made 15 league appearances and scored 1 goal. In 1996, he moved to Turkish club Beşiktaş. He spent two seasons with Beşiktaş and won the Turkish Cup.

In 1998, he moved to Adanaspor. He subsequently played for Naftex Burgas and Lokomotiv Sofia in Bulgaria, as well as Vanspor and Gençlerbirliği in Turkey.

In 2000, he returned to Chernomorets Burgas. In 2001, he moved to Naftex Burgas, where he played through the 2001–02 season before ending his playing career.

== International career ==
Yankov made 79 appearances and scored 4 goals for the Bulgaria national team from 1990 to 1999. He wore the number 6 shirt and made a total of 8 appearances at the 1994 FIFA World Cup and 1998 FIFA World Cup, and also represented Bulgaria at UEFA Euro 1996.

At the 1994 FIFA World Cup, he started all three of Bulgaria's group-stage matches against the Nigeria, Greece, and Argentina. He subsequently started the quarter-final against Germany, the semi-final against Italy, and the third-place play-off against Sweden, making a total of six appearances at the tournament. In particular, in the quarter-final against Germany, he provided the pass that led to Yordan Letchkov's winning goal in the 10th minute of the second half, contributing to Bulgaria's 2–1 victory. Bulgaria finished fourth in the tournament.

At UEFA Euro 1996, he started all three of Bulgaria's group-stage matches. Bulgaria drew 1–1 with Spain in their opening match, before defeating Romania 1–0. They were then eliminated in the group stage after losing 3–1 to France. Yankov wore the number 6 shirt in all three matches.

At the 1998 FIFA World Cup, he wore the number 6 shirt and played in Bulgaria's group-stage matches against Paraguay and Nigeria. He played the full 90 minutes against Paraguay, while he started against Nigeria and was substituted in the 83rd minute. He was named among the substitutes for the final group-stage match against Spain but did not play. Bulgaria were eliminated in the group stage after recording one draw and two defeats.

== Personal life ==
His nickname was Fara (Фара (Bulgarian)), which means lighthouse in Bulgarian. The nickname originated from his father, and during his childhood he was known as Malkiyat Far (Малкият Фар (Bulgarian)), meaning "Little Lighthouse". The nickname reportedly originated when Yankov's father arrived at a football stadium in the Burgas area after dark, prompting people to say, "The lighthouse is coming."

== Career statistics ==
Scores and results list Bulgaria's goal tally first, score column indicates score after each Yankov goal.

List of international goals scored by Zlatko Yankov
No.	Date	Venue	Opponent	Score	Result	Competition
1	16 October 1991	Balgarska Armia Stadium, Sofia, Bulgaria	San Marino	3–0	4–0	Euro 1992 qualifier
2	28 April 1993	Vasil Levski National Stadium, Sofia, Bulgaria	Finland	2–0	2–0	1994 World Cup qualifier
3	15 April 1994	Sultan Qaboos Sports Complex, Muscat, Oman	Oman	1–1	1–1	Friendly match
4	28 April 1994	Al Kuwait Sports Club Stadium, Kuwait City, Kuwait	Kuwait	1–1	2–2	Friendly match

== Honours ==
Levski Sofia

- A Group: 1992–93, 1993–94, 1994–95
- Bulgarian Cup: 1990–91, 1991–92, 1993–94

Beşiktaş

- Turkish Cup: 1997–98
- Turkish Super Cup: 1998

Bulgaria

- FIFA World Cup: fourth place 1994
