= Tapio Yli-Karro =

Finnish football referee

Hannu Tapio Yli-Karro (born 11 October 1953, Rauma) is a Finnish former football referee. He was a FIFA listed international assistant referee from 1990 to 1998.

Yli-Karro officiated 23 international matches, 16 matches at the UEFA club competitions and several youth internationals. He was appointed as an assistant referee to the 1994 FIFA World Cup, 1993 FIFA World Youth Championship and 12th Arabian Gulf Cup. Yli-Karro and Arne Eriksson are the only Finnish referees at World Cup finals so far.

He lives in Western Finnish town Rauma and is working as a headmaster on a high school at Säkylä municipality.

== Matches in the 1994 World Cup ==
Date	Venue	Teams	Result
19 June	Citrus Bowl, Orlando	Belgium vs. Morocco	1–0
23 June	Giants Stadium, East Rutherford	Italy vs. Norway	1–0
25 June	Giants Stadium, East Rutherford	Saudi Arabia vs. Morocco	2–1
30 June	Cotton Bowl, Dallas	Argentina vs. Bulgaria	0–2
