= Tsanko Tsvetanov =

Bulgarian footballer and coach

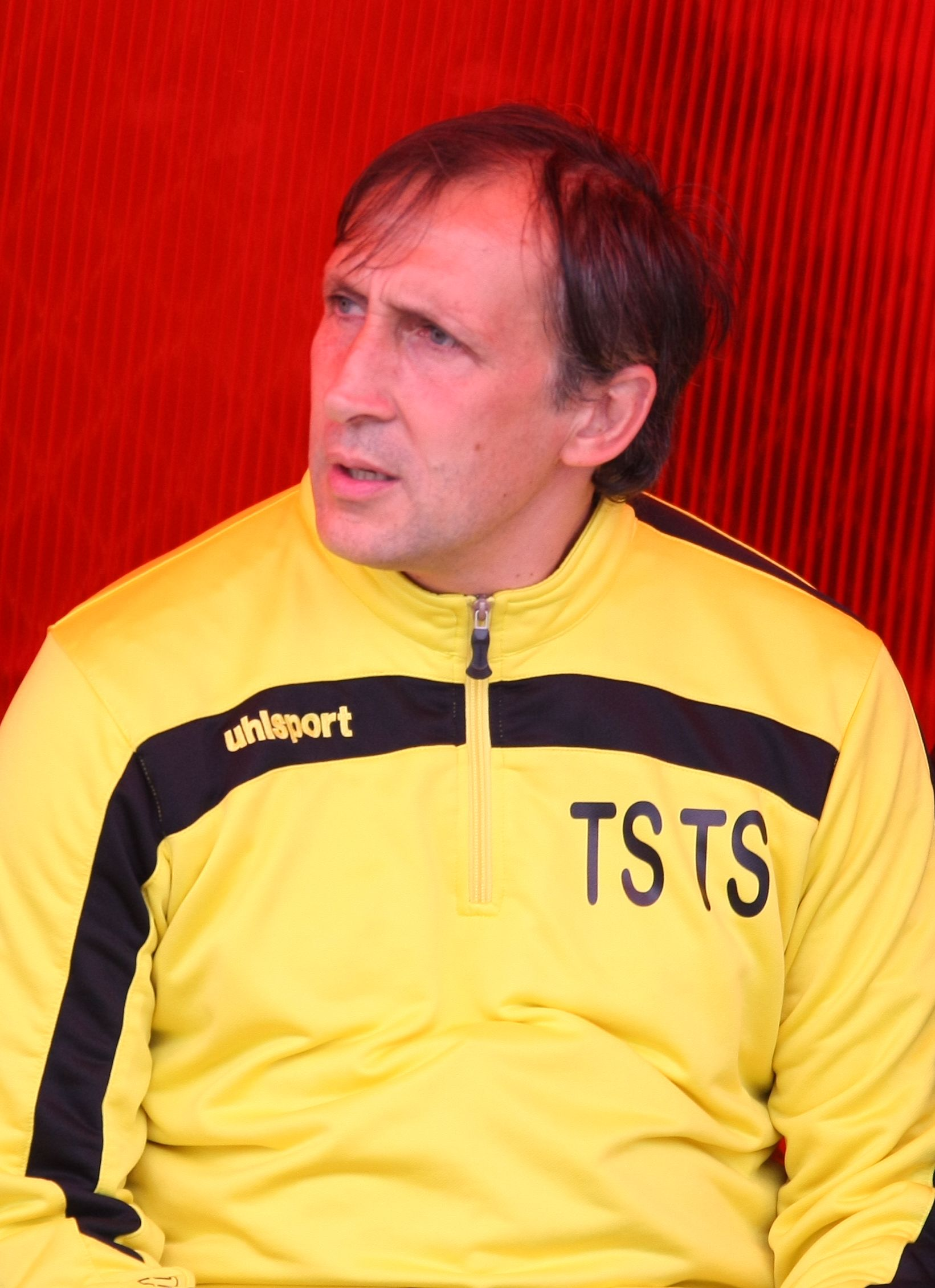

Personal information
- Full name: Tsanko Nikolaev Tsvetanov
- Date of birth: 6 January 1970 (age 56)
- Place of birth: Svishtov, Bulgaria
- Height: 1.78 m (5 ft 10 in)
- Position: Left-back

Youth career
- 1980–1987: Akademik Svishtov

Senior career*
Years	Team	Apps	(Gls)
1987–1988	Akademik Svishtov	17	(1)
1988–1993	Etar Veliko Tarnovo	141	(3)
1993–1995	Levski Sofia	54	(1)
1995–1996	Waldhof Mannheim	17	(0)
1996–1998	Aberdeen	38	(0)
1998–2001	Energie Cottbus	45	(0)
2001–2002	Levski Sofia	8	(0)
2002–2003	Etar 1924	26	(2)
Total		346	(7)

International career
1991–1996	Bulgaria	40	(0)

Managerial career
- 2004–2007: Levski Sofia (assistant)
- 2008–2009: Litex Lovech (assistant)
- 2009–2010: Bulgaria (assistant)
- 2011–2012: Anorthosis (assistant)
- 2012: Etar 1924
- 2013–2014: Botev Plovdiv (assistant)
- 2014–2018: Astana (assistant)
- 2021–2023: Levski Sofia (assistant)
- 2023–: Göztepe S.K. (assistant)
- * Club domestic league appearances and goals

Tsanko Nikolaev Tsvetanov (Bulgarian: Цанко Hиколaeв Цветанов; born 6 January 1970) is a Bulgarian former professional footballer who played as a left-back. After ending his playing career he began coaching, most of the time being the assistant of manager Stanimir Stoilov.

== Club career ==
Tsvetanov was born in Svishtov, Bulgaria. His professional career began in 1987 by playing one season for Akademik Svishtov. Soon he was noticed by Etar Veliko Tarnovo, a team that was a powerhouse in Bulgarian football at the time. He played five seasons and over 140 league matches for the Bolyars. In 1993, he was transferred to Levski Sofia, the champions of Bulgaria for the previous season. After leaving Levski he had a brief stay at Waldhof Mannheim. He signed for Aberdeen in the summer of 1996 and returned in Germany to play three seasons for FC Energie Cottbus. He ended his career at Etar Veliko Tarnovo.

== International career ==
Tsvetanov made 40 appearances for the Bulgaria national team. He was part of the squad that reached the semi-finals of the 1994 World Cup, which remains the biggest success in the history of Bulgarian football. He also played at Euro 96, appearing in all three group stage matches.

== Honours ==
Etar Veliko Tarnovo

- A Group: 1990–91

Levski Sofia

- A Group: 1993–94, 1994–95, 2001–02
- Bulgarian Cup: 1993–94, 2001–02

Bulgaria

- FIFA World Cup fourth place: 1994
