= Zhivko Gospodinov =

Bulgarian footballer (1957–2015)

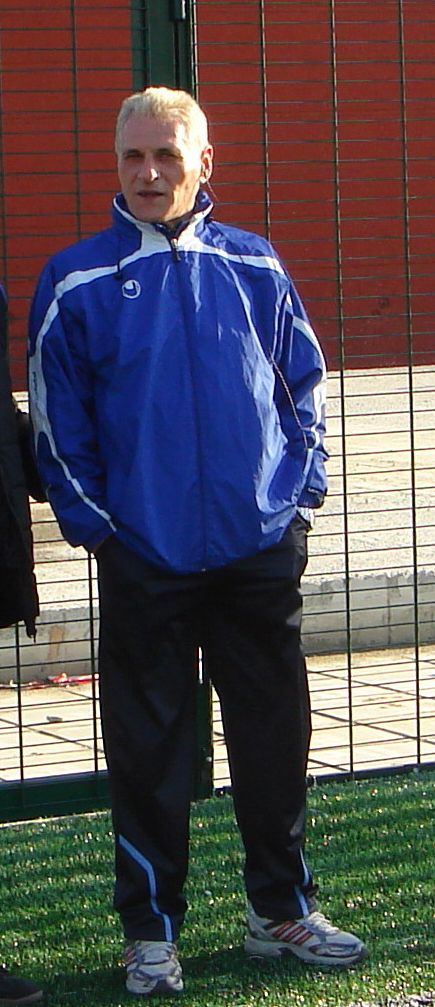

Personal information
- Full name: Zhivko Gospodinov Gospodinov
- Date of birth: 6 September 1957
- Place of birth: Vladimirovo, Bulgaria
- Date of death: 4 May 2015 (aged 57)
- Place of death: Varna, Bulgaria
- Position: Attacking midfielder

Senior career*
Years	Team	Apps	(Gls)
1974–1977	Spartak Varna	10	(1)
1977–1978	Vatev Beloslav	30	(7)
1978–1987	Spartak Varna	269	(93)
1987	Spartak Pleven	13	(5)
1988	Spartak Varna	20	(5)
1989–1990	AD Fafe	18	(1)
1990–1991	Spartak Varna	7	(2)
1991	Cherno More Varna	10	(1)
1992	Beroe Stara Zagora	3	(0)
Total		380	(115)

International career
1983–1987	Bulgaria	39	(6)
- * Club domestic league appearances and goals

Zhivko Gospodinov Hristov (Bulgarian: Живко Господинов Христов; 6 September 1957 – 4 May 2015) was a Bulgarian footballer. Gospodinov was an attacking midfielder and playmaker. In his 18-year-long playing career, he played for Spartak Varna, Vatev Beloslav, Spartak Pleven, AD Fafe, Cherno More Varna and Beroe Stara Zagora.

He played with Spartak Varna and earned 155 caps in the Bulgarian A Professional Football Group. Gospodinov played for Bulgaria national football team (39 caps/6 goals) and was a participant at the 1986 FIFA World Cup.
