= Nikolay Arabov =

Bulgarian footballer and manager

Personal information
- Full name: Nikolay Asenov Arabov
- Date of birth: 14 November 1953 (age 72)
- Place of birth: Sliven, Bulgaria
- Height: 1.76 m (5 ft 9 in)
- Position: Centre-back

Senior career*
Years	Team	Apps	(Gls)
1971–1986	Sliven	391	(11)
1987–1988	Anagennisi Deryneia	23	(1)
1988	Lokomotiv Plovdiv	7	(0)
1988–1990	Spartak Pleven	45	(3)
1990–1991	Cherveno Zname Pavlikeni		
1992–1993	Sliven	14	(2)
1993–1994	KF Tirana	25	(0)
Total		505	(17)

International career
1976–1986	Bulgaria	42	(0)

Managerial career
- Akademik Svishtov
- Tirana
- 2001: Partizani Tirana
- 2002: Flamurtari
- 2009: Botev Kozloduy
- * Club domestic league appearances and goals

Nikolay Asenov Arabov (Bulgarian: Николай Aсенов Арабов; born 14 November 1953) is a Bulgarian former professional footballer and manager who played as a defender from 1971 to 1994, most notably for Sliven.

Arabov was capped 42 times for the Bulgaria national football team and represented the nation at the 1986 FIFA World Cup.

== Career ==
Arabov made his debut for Sliven in 1971 and stayed in the club for 15 years, with 310 games in the A PFG. Capped 42 times for the Bulgaria national football team in the period 1976 – 1986, including 3 games at 1986 FIFA World Cup in Mexico. Arabov has also played for Spartak Pleven, Lokomotiv Plovdiv, Anagennisi Dherynia and Albanian KF Tirana before returning to Sliven for its last season in A PFG (1993). After his retirement as a player Arabov worked for many years in Albania, coaching KF Tirana, KF Partizani, and KS Flamurtari.
