= Emil Kremenliev =

Bulgarian footballer (born 1969)

Personal information
- Full name: Emil Georgiev Kremenliev
- Date of birth: 13 August 1969 (age 57)
- Place of birth: Sofia, Bulgaria
- Height: 1.76 m (5 ft 9 in)
- Position: Right-back

Team information
- Current team: Arda Kardzhali (assistant)

Youth career
- 1980–1989: Slavia Sofia

Senior career*
Years	Team	Apps	(Gls)
1989–1993	Slavia Sofia	77	(2)
1993–1997	Levski Sofia	92	(4)
1996	→ Olympiacos (loan)	12	(1)
1997–2000	CSKA Sofia	116	(2)
2000–2001	Union Berlin	27	(1)
2001–2002	Spartak Varna	21	(3)
2002	Marek Dupnitsa	1	(0)
2003	Conegliano German	4	(0)
2003–2007	Kazichene	61	(21)
Total		379	(33)

International career
1993–1996	Bulgaria	25	(0)
- * Club domestic league appearances and goals

Emil Georgiev Kremenliev (Bulgarian: Емил Георгиев Кременлиев; born 13 August 1969) is a Bulgarian former professional footballer who played as a right-back.

== Career ==
Kremenliev played club football for Slavia Sofia, Levski Sofia, Olympiacos, again in Levski, CSKA Sofia, Union Berlin, Spartak Varna, Marek, Conegliano German and Kazichene. He left Union Berlin in January 2002.

Kremenliev was part of the Bulgaria national team that reached the semi-finals of the 1994 World Cup and also played at Euro 96. He was sent off against Mexico in the knockout round of the 1994 World Cup for yellow card accumulation.

== Honours ==
Levski Sofia

- A PFG: 1993–94, 1994–95
- Bulgarian Cup: 1994

CSKA Sofia

- A PFG: runner-up 1999–00
- Bulgarian Cup: 1999; runner-up 1998

Slavia Sofia

- A PFG: runner-up 1989–90

Union Berlin

- DFB-Pokal: runner-up 2000–01
