= Daniel Borimirov =

Bulgarian footballer (born 1970)

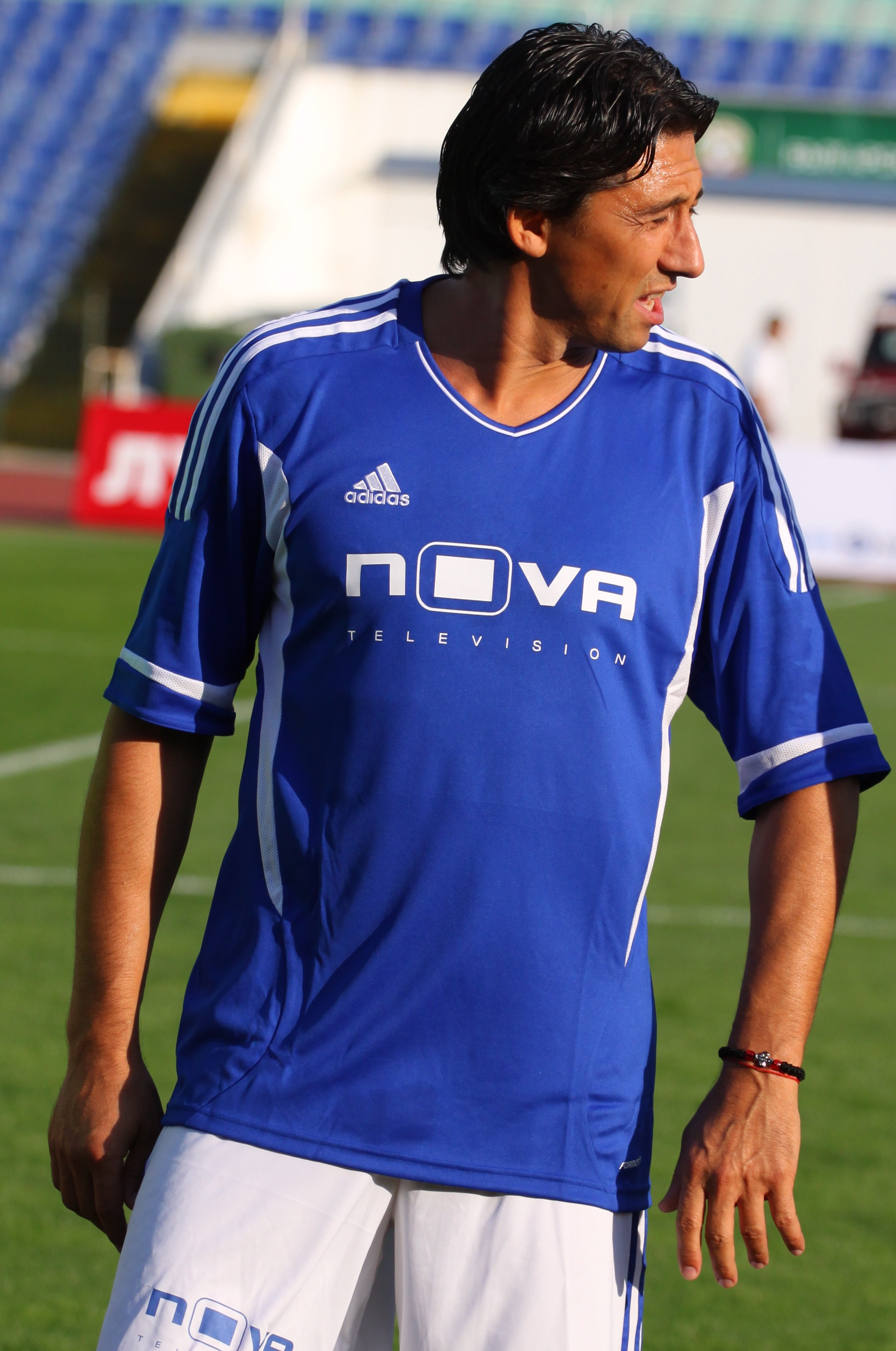
- Borimirov in 2011

Personal information
- Full name: Daniel Borimirov Borisov
- Date of birth: 15 January 1970 (age 56)
- Place of birth: Vidin, Bulgaria
- Height: 1.85 m (6 ft 1 in)
- Position: Attacking midfielder

Youth career
- 1980–1986: Bdin Vidin
- 1986–1987: Botev Vratsa

Senior career*
Years	Team	Apps	(Gls)
1987–1990	Bdin Vidin	91	(18)
1990–1995	Levski Sofia	123	(40)
1995–2004	1860 Munich	213	(31)
2004–2008	Levski Sofia	98	(29)
Total		525	(118)

International career
1993–2005	Bulgaria	67	(5)
- * Club domestic league appearances and goals

Daniel Borimirov Borisov (Bulgarian: Даниел Боримиров Борисов; born 15 January 1970) is a Bulgarian former professional footballer who played mainly as an attacking midfielder.

Borimirov's professional playing career spanned nearly 20 years, during which he played for three clubs: Bdin Vidin, Levski Sofia and TSV 1860 Munich.

In international football, Borimirov made his Bulgaria debut on 18 February 1993 at the age of 23. He made 66 career appearances in total, appearing at two FIFA World Cup tournaments, in 1994 and 1998, and two UEFA European Championship tournaments, in 1996 and 2004.

== Club career ==
Born in Vidin, Borimirov's club career began with local club Bdin in second league, where he made his first-team debut in 1987 at age 17.

In 1990 Borimirov joined Levski Sofia. In the beginning, he appeared mainly as a supporting striker, but eventually reconverted to attacking midfielder. At Levski, Borimirov was very important – if not crucial – part in all of the club's six major titles during his first spell, three leagues and three cups. The biggest victory in the history of The Eternal Derby of Bulgaria (7–1 for Levski in 1994–95 A Group) is unthinkable without the two goals scored by Daniel Borimirov. After 32 goals combined in his last two years, with three back-to-back national championships, he signed with Germany's TSV 1860 Munich.

Borimirov made his Bundesliga debut on 12 August 1995, scoring twice at FC St. Pauli, albeit in a 4–2 loss, adding another two in the next two games, as the Lions eventually finished in eighth position; in the following season, he experienced his best year abroad, netting nine times in 31 matches, helping TSV qualify for the UEFA Cup.

In the following years, although used more sparingly, Borimirov continued to be an important member for Munich 1860, eventually appearing in nearly 300 official matches in his 8 1/2-year spell. 214 of them were in the Bundesliga. In early January 2004, one week shy of his 34th birthday, he returned to Levski, being the driving force behind the success of the club in the 2005–06 UEFA Cup, helping the capital outfit to the quarterfinals, namely scoring against Udinese Calcio and FC Schalke 04 (the latter in the stage where the club was ousted, 2–4 on aggregate).

In an interview on 16 August 2006, Borimirov stated he was attending coaching classes, intending to work in football after retiring as a player. On 1 July of the following year, he played for a FIFA All-Star team against China in an exhibition game as part of Hong Kong's ten-year independence anniversary celebrations. The miscellaneous side was coached by Gérard Houllier, and featured players like Hidetoshi Nakata, Stéphane Chapuisat, Christian Karembeu, George Weah and Brian McBride.

Borimirov still played an important part in the 2006–07 season, playing in 20 matches (four goals) as Levski won the league – and the cup. He ended his career at the age of 38, playing his last game on 17 May 2008 against city neighbours PFC Slavia Sofia, with his team winning the match.

After retiring, Borimirov served as director of football at Levski Sofia, replacing former club and national teammate Nasko Sirakov, and himself being replaced at the end of 2008–09 by Georgi Ivanov.

=== Controversy ===
In 2006, still as a player, Borimirov gained notoriety in Bulgarian football circles for his violent outbursts after controversial referee decisions. One particular accident in which he was involved in resulted in him spitting in the face of the referee. Borimirov was fined 10,000 Bulgarian lev by the Bulgarian Football Union, later apologizing for his behaviour.

Two years later, now in directorial capacities, he caused more controversy, following a match against PFC CSKA Sofia.

== International career ==
Borimirov made his debut for the Bulgaria national team on 18 February 1993 and represented the national team through 2005. He made a total of 67 international appearances and scored 5 goals, participating in major international tournaments including the 1994 FIFA World Cup, UEFA Euro 1996, 1998 FIFA World Cup, and UEFA Euro 2004. He was one of the Bulgarian players to participate in two FIFA World Cups and two UEFA European Championships, and was also one of the players to participate in both the 1994 World Cup and Euro 2004.

At the 1994 FIFA World Cup, he came on as a substitute in Bulgaria's group-stage match against the Greece, scoring a goal. Borimirov was introduced with nine minutes remaining and contributed to Bulgaria's 4–0 victory, which was Bulgaria's first-ever win in the FIFA World Cup finals. He subsequently came on as a substitute in the round-of-16 match against the Mexico, playing through extra time and successfully converted his penalty in the shootout. Bulgaria defeated Mexico in the shootout to advance to the quarter-finals.

Borimirov was named among the substitutes but did not play in the quarter-final against the Germany, the semi-final against the Italy, or the third-place play-off against the Sweden. Bulgaria defeated Germany 2–1 to advance to the semi-finals, but lost 2–1 to Italy and then 4–0 to Sweden in the third-place play-off, finishing fourth overall.

Borimirov also participated in UEFA Euro 1996. Bulgaria faced the Spain, Romania, and France in the group stage, and Borimirov appeared in all three matches. Bulgaria defeated Romania 1–0, but drew 1–1 with Spain and lost 3–1 to France, resulting in their elimination in the group stage.

He was also part of the Bulgarian national team at the 1998 FIFA World Cup. Borimirov appeared in all three of Bulgaria's group-stage matches against Paraguay, Nigeria, and Spain. He came on in the 76th minute against Paraguay, was introduced at the start of the second half against Nigeria, and started and played the full match against Spain. Bulgaria drew 0–0 with Paraguay before losing to Nigeria and Spain and being eliminated in the group stage.

Borimirov continued to represent the national team and also participated in UEFA Euro 2004. At the age of 34, he was included in the squad for all three group-stage matches against Sweden, Denmark, and Italy, but he actually played only in the final match against Italy. He started the match and played the full 90 minutes. Bulgaria lost 5–0 to Sweden, 2–0 to Denmark, and 2–1 to Italy, and were eliminated in the group stage.

Borimirov remained with the Bulgaria national team until 2005 before retiring from international football. Over a national-team career spanning approximately 12 years, he made 67 appearances and scored 5 goals, experiencing a fourth-place finish at the 1994 World Cup and participating in two World Cups and two European Championships.

== Personal life ==
Borimirov was born in the village of Pokrayna in Vidin. In an interview with Gazeta Sporturilor, Borimirov said that his maternal grandparents are Romanian. He is married to Aphrodita and they have two children.

== Career statistics ==
=== Club ===
Appearances and goals by club, season and competition
Club	Season	League			Cup		Continental		Total	
Club	Season	Division	Apps	Goals	Apps	Goals	Apps	Goals	Apps	Goals
Bdin Vidin	B Group	1987–88	33	7			–		33	7
Bdin Vidin	B Group	1988–89	21	0			–		21	0
Bdin Vidin	B Group	1989–90	37	11			–		37	11
Bdin Vidin	Total		91	18			0	0	91	18
Levski Sofia	A Group	1990–91	28	3	7	1	–		38	13
Levski Sofia	A Group	1991–92	14	0	8	2	0	0	36	14
Levski Sofia	A Group	1992–93	29	5	6	0	2	1	36	14
Levski Sofia	A Group	1993–94	23	15	6	6	4	1	12	4
Levski Sofia	A Group	1994–95	29	17	1	1	1	0	31	15
Levski Sofia	Total		123	40	28	10	7	2	158	52
1860 Munich	Bundesliga	1995–96	25	6	3	1	–		28	7
1860 Munich	Bundesliga	1996–97	31	9	3	2	1	0	35	11
1860 Munich	Bundesliga	1997–98	32	3	1	0	2	1	35	4
1860 Munich	Bundesliga	1998–99	23	2	2	0	–		25	2
1860 Munich	Bundesliga	1999–00	20	2	2	0	–		22	2
1860 Munich	Bundesliga	2000–01	24	3	1	0	5	0	30	3
1860 Munich	Bundesliga	2001–02	26	4	3	1	4	0	33	5
1860 Munich	Bundesliga	2002–03	26	2	2	0	2	0	30	2
1860 Munich	Bundesliga	2003–04	6	0	1	0	–		7	0
1860 Munich	Total		213	31	18	4	14	1	245	36
Levski Sofia	A Group	2003–04	11	3	0	0	2	0	13	3
Levski Sofia	A Group	2004–05	23	10	4	1	3	0	30	11
Levski Sofia	A Group	2005–06	22	9	1	0	13	2	36	11
Levski Sofia	A Group	2006–07	20	4	3	1	10	1	33	6
Levski Sofia	A Group	2007–08	22	3	2	0	1	0	25	3
Levski Sofia	Total		98	29	10	2	29	3	137	34
Career total			525	118	56	16	50	6	631	140

=== International ===
Appearances and goals by national team and year
National team	Year	Apps	Goals
Bulgaria	1993	5	1
Bulgaria	1994	9	1
Bulgaria	1995	5	0
Bulgaria	1996	11	1
Bulgaria	1997	4	1
Bulgaria	1998	7	0
Bulgaria	1999	7	1
Bulgaria	2000	6	0
Bulgaria	2001	0	0
Bulgaria	2002	1	0
Bulgaria	2003	7	0
Bulgaria	2004	3	0
Bulgaria	2005	2	0
Total		67	5

Scores and results list Bulgaria's goal tally first, score column indicates score after each Borimirov goal.

List of international goals scored by Daniel Borimirov
No.	Date	Venue	Opponent	Score	Result	Competition
1	20 February 1993	Dubai	United Arab Emirates	3–1	3–1	Friendly
2	26 June 1994	Soldier Field, Chicago	Greece	4–0	4–0	1994 FIFA World Cup
3	8 November 1996	Supachalasai National Stadium, Bangkok	Thailand	4–0	4–0	Friendly
4	2 April 1997	Vasil Levski National Stadium, Sofia	Cyprus	1–0	4–1	FIFA World Cup 1998 Qualification
5	10 October 1999	Stadion Balgarska Armia, Sofia	Luxembourg	1–0	3–0	UEFA Euro 2000 Qualification

== Honours ==
Levski Sofia

- Bulgarian League: 1992–93, 1993–94, 1994–95, 2005–06, 2006–07
- Bulgarian Cup: 1990–91, 1991–92, 1993–94, 2004–05, 2006–07
- Bulgarian Supercup: 2005, 2007

Bulgaria

- FIFA World Cup: fourth place 1994
