= Deaths in September 1990 =

The following is a list of notable deaths in September 1990.

Entries for each day are listed alphabetically by surname. A typical entry lists information in the following sequence:

- Name, age, country of citizenship at birth, subsequent country of citizenship (if applicable), reason for notability, cause of death (if known), and reference.

== September 1990 ==
=== 1 ===
- Buster Adams, 75, American baseball player (St. Louis Cardinals, Philadelphia Phillies), heart failure.
- Afanasy Beloborodov, 87, Soviet general.
- John Wesley Burgess, 83, Canadian politician, member of the House of Commons of Canada (1962-1963).
- Arnoldo Gabaldón, 81, Venezuelan physician and politician.
- Geir Hallgrímsson, 64, Icelandic politician, prime minister (1974–1978).
- Stefán Kristjánsson, 66, Icelandic Olympic skier (1952, 1956).
- Alex Levinsky, 80, American-born Canadian ice hockey player (Toronto Maple Leafs, New York Rangers, Chicago Black Hawks).
- Les Ramsay, 70, Canadian ice hockey player (Chicago Black Hawks).
- Edwin O. Reischauer, 79, American diplomat, hepatitis C.
- Derviš Sušić, 65, Yugoslav writer.

=== 2 ===
- Tom Atkinson, 59, English cricketer.
- John Bowlby, 83, British psychologist.
- Sári Bíró, 83, Hungarian pianist.
- Robert Holmes à Court, 53, South African-born Australian businessman, heart attack.
- Marcus Cunliffe, 68, British scholar.
- Erich Herker, 84, German Olympic ice hockey player (1932).
- Jože Javoršek, 69, Yugoslav and Slovenian playwright, writer, poet, and essayist.
- Robert Francis Joyce, 93, American Roman Catholic prelate.
- Léon van Hove, 66, Belgian physicist.
- Mark Mauldin, 75, American baseball player (Chicago White Sox).

=== 3 ===
- Slava Amiragov, 64, Soviet Belarusian Olympic rower (1952, 1956).
- Marshall Bridges, 59, American baseball player, cancer.
- Fappiano, 13, American thoroughbred racehorse.
- Mieczysław Fogg, 89, Polish singer.
- Betty Glamann, 67, American harpist.
- The Minstrel, 16, Canadian-Irish thoroughbred racehorse, euthanized.
- Elizabeth Douglas-Home, Baroness Home of the Hirsel, 80, British socialite, spouse of the prime minister (1963–1964).
- Victor Hooper, 85, Australian cricketer.
- Eugene Martynov, 42, Soviet singer, heart failure.
- Wang Zhenhe, 49, Taiwanese writer.
- Chen Tien, 67, Malaysian politician, Central Committee member of the Malayan Communist Party.

=== 4 ===
- Ignacio Luis Arcaya, 78, Venezuelan lawyer and politician.
- Lawrence A. Cremin, 64, American education historian, heart attack.
- Irene Dunne, 91, American actress (The Awful Truth), cardioplegia, heart attack.
- Turan Dursun, 55-56, Turkish author and critic of Islam, shot.
- Giuseppe Gobbato, 86, Italian Olympic racewalker (1936).
- Willy Heldenstein, 94, Luxembourgian Olympic bobsledder (1928).
- Alceo Lipizer, 69, Italian footballer.
- Alden Whitman, 76, American journalist, stroke.

=== 5 ===
- Allen Adams, 44, Scottish politician, cerebral hemorrhage.
- Beppo Brem, 84, West German actor, lung cancer.
- Hugh Foot, Baron Caradon, 82, British colonial administrator.
- Alessandro Ciceri, 58, Italian Olympic sport shooter (1956).
- Roderic Alfred Gregory, 76, British physiologist.
- Jack Hildyard, 82, British cinematographer (The Bridge on the River Kwai, The Wild Geese, Topaz), Oscar winner (1958).
- Graham Hough, 82, English literary critic.
- Charlie Huneke, 69, American football player.
- Jerry Iger, 87, American cartoonist (Eisner & Iger).
- Ivan Mihailov, 94, Yugoslav and Bulgarian revolutionary.
- Vasile Moldovan, 79, Romanian Olympic gymnast (1936).
- John Naioti, 68, American football player (Pittsburgh Steelers).
- Karl-Heinz Peters, 87, German film actor.
- Frank Waldman, 71, American screenwriter.

=== 6 ===
- Madaram Brahma, 87, Indian poet and dramatist.
- Issan Dorsey, 57, American Sōtō Zen monk and teacher, AIDS-related complications.
- Tom Fogerty, 48, American guitarist (Creedence Clearwater Revival), AIDS-related tuberculosis.
- Francisco Eppens Helgueras, 77, Mexican artist.
- Jack Howells, 77, Welsh filmmaker.
- Sir Len Hutton, 74, English cricketer, complications from heart surgery.
- Beniamino Maggio, 83, Italian actor.
- Eiji Nakano, 85, Japanese actor, stomach cancer.
- Elias Nakhleh, 76-77, Israeli politician.
- Herbert Spiegelberg, 86, German-American philosopher, leukemia.
- Fernando Valenti, 63, American harpsichordist, heart attack.
- Al Veach, 81, American baseball player (Philadelphia Athletics).

=== 7 ===
- Prince Filiberto, Duke of Genoa, 95, Italian royal.
- Ahti Karjalainen, 67, Finnish politician, prime minister (1962–1963, 1970–1971), pancreatic cancer.
- Earle E. Partridge, 90, American general.
- Clärenore Stinnes, 89, German racing driver.
- A. J. P. Taylor, 84, British historian, Parkinson's disease.

=== 8 ===
- Toon Duijnhouwer, 78, Dutch footballer.
- Gustav Gerhart, 68, Austrian Olympic football player (1948).
- Joe Gleason, 95, American baseball player (Washington Senators).
- Kathleen Gough, 65, British anthropologist, cancer.
- Dimitar Mutafchiev, 87, Bulgarian Olympic football player (1924).
- Sven Rosendahl, 77, Swedish journalist, novelist and short story writer.
- Boris Tenin, 85, Soviet actor.
- Denys Watkins-Pitchford, 85, British children's author and illustrator.

=== 9 ===
- Nicola Abbagnano, 89, Italian philosopher.
- Molly Adair, 85, English actress.
- Louis Awad, 75, Egyptian intellectual and a writer.
- Doc Cramer, 85, American baseball player (Philadelphia Athletics, Boston Red Sox, Detroit Tigers).
- Samuel Doe, 39, Liberian politician, president (since 1986), torture murder.
- Alexander Men, 55, Soviet theologian, murdered.
- George Sime, 75, Scottish Olympic field hockey player (1948).
- Anatoly Sofronov, 79, Soviet writer.
- Rimantas Stankevičius, 46, Lithuanian cosmonaut and pilot, plane crash.
- Hugh Sutherland, 83, Canadian Olympic ice hockey player (1932).
- Harvey Teno, 75, Canadian ice hockey player (Detroit Red Wings).

=== 10 ===
- Charles Coleman, 43, American convicted murderer, execution by lethal injection.
- Catharose de Petri, 88, Dutch mystic and spiritual leader.
- Svend Madsen, 93, Danish Olympic gymnast (1920).
- Ernst-Wilhelm Modrow, 82, German flying ace during World War II.
- Zoltán Rozsnyai, 64, Hungarian conductor, heart attack.

=== 11 ===
- F. F. Bruce, 79, Scottish biblical scholar.
- Cai Chang, 90, Chinese politician and women's rights activist.
- Theodore J. Conway, 81, American four-star general, commander STRICOM.
- Myrna Chang, 40, Guatemalan anthropologist, stabbed.
- Byron Eby, 85, American football player (Portsmouth Spartans).
- Julius Jacobsen, 75, Danish composer.
- Alois Kratzer, 83, German Olympic ski jumper (1928).
- Iris von Roten-Meyer, 73, Swiss journalist, suicide.

=== 12 ===
- Irena Eichlerówna, 82, Polish actress.
- Archibald Howie, 82, Canadian Olympic sailor (1952).
- Ivica Kurtini, 68, Yugoslav Olympic water polo player (1948, 1952).
- Jim Romano, 63, American baseball player (Brooklyn Dodgers).
- Nancy Ryles, 52, American politician, cancer.
- Athene Seyler, 101, English actress.
- Charles Walker, 50, American convicted murderer, execution by lethal injection.

=== 13 ===
- Adda Husted Andersen, 92, Danish-American jeweler, silversmith, and metalsmith.
- George Hardy, 78, Canadian-American labor leader, respiratory failure.
- Marya Mannes, 85, American writer and critic.
- Giancarlo Pajetta, 79, Italian politician.
- Samuel S. Stratton, 73, American politician, member of the U.S. House of Representatives (1959–1989).

=== 14 ===
- Nazrul Islam Babu, 41, Bangladeshi lyricist.
- Wim De Craene, 40, Belgian singer, suicide by drug overdose.
- Varananda Dhavaj, 70, Thai royal.
- Leonid Ivanov, 69, Soviet Olympic footballer (1952).
- Lőrinc Jankovich, 82, Hungarian Olympic equestrian (1936).
- Lotus Long, 81, American actress.

=== 15 ===
- Ken Domon, 80, Japanese photographer.
- Mick Donohue, 73, Australian rules footballer.
- Valentin Filatyev, 60, Soviet cosmonaut.
- David Lester, 74, American biochemist.
- Hans Malmstrøm, 77, Danish Olympic swimmer (1936).
- Max Schäfer, 83, German football player.
- Gerard Veldkamp, 69, Dutch politician.

=== 16 ===
- James Francis Carney, 75, Canadian Roman Catholic prelate, cancer.
- Jesús Evaristo Casariego, 76, Spanish writer and publisher.
- Steve Condos, 71, American tap dancer, heart attack.
- Semyon Kurkotkin, 73, Soviet general.
- Oscarino Costa Silva, 83, Brazilian football player.
- Harold Palin, 74, English rugby player.
- John Staton, 88, American football player and businessman.
- Ron Withnall, 75, Australian politician.

=== 17 ===
- Lucien Barrière, 67, French businessman, cardiac arrest.
- Laidley Burge, 93, Australian rugby league player.
- Oliver Butterworth, 75, American author, cancer.
- J. F. Gates Clarke, 85, Canadian-American entomologist.
- Jackie Cox, 78-79, Scottish footballer.
- Janet Hill Gordon, 75, American politician.
- Joseph T. Maras, 74, American football player (Pittsburgh Steelers), and coach.
- Angelo Schiavio, 84, Italian football player and Olympian (1928).
- Loretta Clemens Tupper, 84, American actress and singer.

=== 18 ===
- Gyula Décsi, 71, Hungarian politician and jurist
- Dinny Fagan, 84, Australian rules footballer.
- Richard Eric Holttum, 95, English botanist.
- Marjan Rožanc, 59, Yugoslav writer.
- Ed Sadowski, 73, American basketball player, cancer.
- Walter Thompson Welford, 74, British physicist.

=== 19 ===
- Werner Janssen, 91, American conductor.
- Donal Keenan, 71, Irish Gaelic games administrator.
- Allan McKinnon, 73, Canadian politician, cancer.
- Ian Moir, 58, Australian rugby player.
- Hermes Pan, 80, American dancer and choreographer.
- Walter Tucker, 91, Canadian politician.

=== 20 ===
- Rosa Balistreri, 63, Italian singer.
- Siegfried Behrend, 56, German classical guitarist and composer.
- Claude Colette, 61, French racing cyclist.
- Dick Gyselman, 82, American baseball player (Boston Braves).
- Lucien Konter, 65, Luxembourgish Olympic footballer (1948).
- Thomas McGrath, 73, American poet and screenwriter.
- Attilio Micheluzzi, 60, Italian comics artist.
- Jackie Moran, 67, American actor, lung cancer.
- Ed Robnett, 70, American football player (San Francisco 49ers).
- Robert Rodale, 60, American publishing executive, traffic collision.

=== 21 ===
- Jacques-Laurent Bost, 74, French journalist, cancer.
- Jack Cockburn, 78, Australian rules footballer.
- Sumner Getchell, 83, American actor.
- Frans Herman, 63, Belgian Olympic runner (1952, 1956).
- Jack Hunter, 75, Australian rules footballer.
- Takis Kanellopoulos, 56, Greek filmmaker, heart attack.
- Alexander Konstantinopolsky, 80, Soviet chess player.
- Rosario Livatino, 37, Italian magistrate, murdered.
- Tufail Niazi, 73-74, Pakistani singer.
- Frank Quillen, 69, American football player.
- Charles Calvin Rogers, 61, American Army soldier, Medal of Honor recipient, prostate cancer.
- Robert L. Thorndike, 79, American psychologist, heart failure.
- John Wallace, 87, American Olympic sailor (1936).
- Xu Xiangqian, 88, Chinese general.

=== 22 ===
- Raj Bahadur, 78, Indian politician.
- John A. Danaher, 91, American politician, member of the U.S. Senate (1939–1945).
- Michael Swann, 70, British microbiologist.
- Len Szafaryn, 62, American gridiron football player (Washington Redskins, Philadelphia Eagles, Green Bay Packers).

=== 23 ===
- Pål Angell-Hansen, 65, Norwegian footballer.
- Hilliard Beyerstein, 82, Canadian politician.
- William James Broughton, 77, New Zealand jockey.
- Harry Z. Isaacs, 86, American businessman.
- László Ladány, 76, Hungarian jesuit, China watcher, and author.

=== 24 ===
- Tim Archer, 93, Australian rules footballer.
- Kang Joon-Ho, 62, South Korean boxer and Olympic medalist (1952).
- Zlata Kolarić-Kišur, 95, Yugoslav writer.
- Àngel Sabata, 79, Spanish Olympic water polo player (1928, 1948).
- Ladislas Smid, 75, Hungarian-French footballer.
- Johnny Werts, 92, American baseball player (Boston Braves).

=== 25 ===
- Wilfred Burns, 73, British composer of film scores.
- Stellio Lorenzi, 69, French screenwriter, cancer.
- Frank C. Lynch-Staunton, 85, Canadian politician, stroke.
- Sabyasachi Mukharji, 63, Indian judge and Chief Justice, heart attack.
- Kaharuddin Nasution, 65, Indonesian politician.
- Prafulla Chandra Sen, 93, Indian politician.
- Giuseppe Valle, 86, Italian Olympic water polo player (1924).
- Vjekoslav Vrančić, 86, Croatian politician.

=== 26 ===
- Hiram Abas, 57-58, Turkish intelligence official, murdered.
- Lothar Collatz, 80, German mathematician, heart attack.
- Cecil Gray, 88, Australian cricketer.
- Alberto Moravia, 82, Italian novelist.
- Saya Zawgyi, 83, Burmese poet, writer, and academic.

=== 27 ===
- John Aldam Aizlewood, 95, British soldier.
- Marie-Thérèse Auffray, 77, French painter.
- Matvey Blanter, 87, Soviet composer ("Katyusha").
- Tom Crouch, 74, Australian rules footballer.
- Carlos Guichandut, 75, Argentine singer.
- Seymour H. Knox II, 92, American academic.
- María Agustina Rivas López, 70, Peruvian religious sister, shot.

=== 28 ===
- Roy Francis Adkins, 42, English gangster, shot.
- Zia Mohiuddin Dagar, 61, Indian musician.
- Dan Davin, 77, English writer.
- Ray Hendrick, 61, American racing driver, cancer.
- Prince Karl of Leiningen, 62, German noble.
- Larry O'Brien, 73, American politician and NBA commissioner, cancer.
- Willy Schröder, 78, German discus thrower and Olympian (1936).

=== 29 ===
- Scott Bartlett, 46-47, American artist, complications from an organ transplant.
- Jacques Boulas, 41, French racing cyclist.
- Raffaele Forni, 84, Swiss Roman Catholic prelate, traffic collision.
- Lawrence Kasha, 56, American playwright, AIDS.
- Freddie Kohlman, 72, American musician, cancer.
- Hannes Koivunen, 79, Finnish Olympic boxer (1936).
- Al McLean, 78, American baseball player (Washington Senators).
- David Park, 54-55, British computer scientist.
- Patrick Tierney, 86, Irish politician.

=== 30 ===
- Alexej Čepička, 80, Czechoslovak politician.
- Ingvald Frøysa, 86, Norwegian footballer.
- W. F. R. Hardie, 88, Scottish philosopher.
- Rudolf Jahn, 83, German politician.
- Michel Leiris, 89, French writer, heart attack.
- Al Lolotai, 70, Samoan-American football player (Washington Redskins).
- Geoffrey Marks, 58, Sri Lankan Olympic swimmer (1952).
- Rob Moroso, 22, American racing driver, traffic collision.
- Shankar Nag, 35, Indian actor and filmmaker, traffic collision.
- Phil Napoleon, 89, American jazz trumpeter and bandleader.
- Alice Parizeau, 60, Polish-Canadian writer, cancer.
- Nels Potter, 79, American baseball player.
- Ruth Cheney Streeter, 94, United States Marine Corps lieutenant colonel, heart failure.
- Patrick White, 78, British-Australian writer, Nobel Prize recipient (1973).
- Zygmunt Zintel, 79, Polish actor.
