= 1925 Bulgarian State Football Championship =

Bulgarian State Football Championship
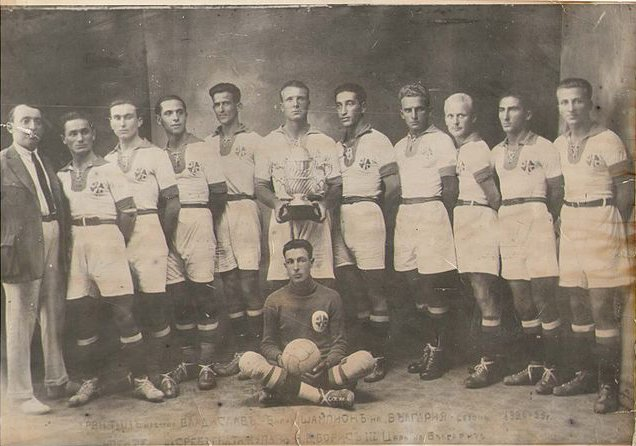
- Vladislav Varna with the title in 1925.
- Season: 1925
- Champions: Vladislav Varna
- Matches: 5
- Goals: 18 (3.6 per match)

The 1925 Bulgarian State Football Championship was the second edition of the Bulgarian State Football Championship. It was contested by 6 teams, and Vladislav Varna won the championship by beating Levski Sofia 2–0 in the finals. They became the first football champions of Bulgaria.

== Qualified teams ==
The teams that participated in the competition were the six winners of their local sport federations.

Federation	Team
Severobulgarska SF	Vladislav Varna
Bdinska SF	Orel Vratsa
Sofiyska SF	Levski Sofia
Yugozapadna SF	Levski Dupnitsa
Trakiyska SF	BP 25 Plovdiv (Note: The full name of BP 25 Plovdiv is Benkovski-Pobeda 25.)
Seaside sport federation	Asenovets Sliven

== Quarter-finals ==
Team 1	Score	Team 2
Levski Dupnitsa	5–0	Orel Vratsa
Vladislav Varna	3–0 (w/o)	Asenovets Sliven
BP 25 Plovdiv	bye	
Levski Sofia	bye	

== Semi-finals ==
Team 1	Score	Team 2
Vladislav Varna	4–0	Levski Dupnitsa
BP 25 Plovdiv	0–4	Levski Sofia

== Final ==
30 August 1925

Levski Sofia	0–2	Vladislav Varna
		P. Ivanov 3' (o.g.); Terzetta (??)

Yunak Stadium, Sofia
Attendance: 10,000
Referee: Ivan Batandzhiev (Sofia)

GK	(Bulgaria) Petar Ivanov
DF	(Bulgaria) Aleksandar Hristov
DF	(Bulgaria) Ivan Radoev
DF	(Bulgaria) Simeon Yankov
MF	(Bulgaria) Geno Mateev
MF	(Bulgaria) Dimitar Drazhev
FW	(Bulgaria) Kiril Petrunov
FW	(Bulgaria) Dimitar Mutafchiev
FW	(Bulgaria) Tsvetan Genev (c)
FW	(Bulgaria) Konstantin Maznikov
FW	(Bulgaria) Kiril Yovovich
Manager:
(Bulgaria) Boris Vasilev

GK	(Bulgaria) Zdravko Yanakiev
DF	(Bulgaria) Lyuben Mitev
DF	(Bulgaria) Boris Stavrev
DF	(Bulgaria) Petar Hristov (Vladislav Varna footballer)
MF	(Bulgaria) Georgi Georgiev
MF	(Russian Soviet Federative Socialist Republic) Ivan Bulgakov
FW	(Bulgaria) Dimitar Dimitriev
FW	(Kingdom of Italy) Egon Terzetta (c)
FW	(Bulgaria) Krastyo Petrov
FW	(Bulgaria) Aleksi Aleksiev
FW	(Bulgaria) Andrey Ivanov
Manager:
(Germany) Ernst Murg
