= 1988 Soviet Army Cup final =

1988 Cup of the Soviet Army final
Levski Sofia	Cherno More Varna
A Group	B Group
2	0
- Date: 1 June 1988
- Venue: Vasil Levski National Stadium, Sofia
- Referee: Nedyalko Tahtadzhiev (Plovdiv)
- Attendance: 20,000

The 1988 Cup of the Soviet Army final was the 6th final of the Cup of the Soviet Army (as a secondary cup tournament in Bulgaria), and was contested between Levski Sofia and Cherno More Varna on 1 June 1988 at Vasil Levski National Stadium in Sofia. Levski won the final 2–0.

== Match ==
=== Details ===
1 June 1988

Levski Sofia	2−0	Cherno More Varna
Sirakov 55', 70'

Vasil Levski National Stadium, Sofia
Attendance: 20,000
Referee: Nedyalko Tahtadzhiev (Plovdiv)

Levski	Cherno More

GK	1	(Bulgaria) Borislav Mihaylov
DF	2	(Bulgaria) Kiril Vangelov
DF	3	(Bulgaria) Krasimir Koev
DF	4	(Bulgaria) Petar Petrov
DF	5	(Bulgaria) Nikolay Iliev
MF	6	(Bulgaria) Stoil Georgiev	(substituted off) 79'
MF	7	(Bulgaria) Emil Velev
FW	8	(Bulgaria) Nasko Sirakov
FW	9	(Bulgaria) Petar Kurdov	(substituted off) 71'
MF	10	(Bulgaria) Georgi Yordanov
FW	11	(Bulgaria) Bozhidar Iskrenov
Substitutes:
FW	--	(Bulgaria) Rosen Krumov	(substituted in) 71'
MF	--	(Bulgaria) Sasho Nachev	(substituted in) 79'
Manager:
(Bulgaria) Vasil Metodiev

GK	1	(Bulgaria) Yordan Filipov
DF	2	(Bulgaria) Boyan Hristov
DF	3	(Bulgaria) Todor Marev
DF	4	(Bulgaria) Stefan Bachev
DF	5	(Bulgaria) Hristo Kotev
MF	6	(Bulgaria) Todor Atanasov
MF	7	(Bulgaria) Georgi Stoychev	(substituted off) 79'
FW	8	(Bulgaria) Ognyan Radev	(substituted off) 46'
FW	9	(Bulgaria) Ivan Petrov
MF	10	(Bulgaria) Milen Bakardzhiev
MF	11	(Bulgaria) Tinko Vazharov
Substitutes:
MF	--	(Bulgaria) Nikola Nikolov	(substituted in) 46'
FW	--	(Bulgaria) Ivan Stoyanov	(substituted in) 79'
Manager:
(Bulgaria) Bozhil Kolev
