= Nikola Mutafchiev =

Bulgarian footballer

Personal information
- Date of birth: 10 August 1904
- Place of birth: Stara Zagora, Bulgaria
- Date of death: 24 March 1963 (aged 58)
- Position: Forward

Senior career*
Years	Team	Apps	(Gls)
1920–1927	Levski Sofia		

International career
1924–1925	Bulgaria		
- * Club domestic league appearances and goals

Nikola Mutafchiev (Bulgarian: Никола Мутафчиев) (10 August 1904 – 24 March 1963) was a Bulgarian footballer who played as a forward for Levski Sofia and Bulgaria during the 1920s. His elder brother Dimitar Mutafchiev also was a footballer.

== Career ==
For six seasons from 1921 to 1927, Mutafchiev scored 50 goals in 52 games for Levski.

He played for the national team in the Bulgaria's first international match against Austria in Vienna on 21 May 1924. Mutafchiev also participated at the 1924 Summer Olympics. On 10 April 1925, he became the first player to score for Bulgaria in a 2–1 friendly loss against Turkey.

== Career statistics ==
Club	Season	League	
Club	Season	Apps	Goals
Levski Sofia	1921–22	10	9
Levski Sofia	1922–23	8	7
Levski Sofia	1923–24	16	15
Levski Sofia	1924–25	14	18
Levski Sofia	1925–26	0	0
Levski Sofia	1926–27	4	1
Career totals		52	50

== Honours ==
Levski Sofia

- Bulgarian State Football Championship
  - Runners-up (1): 1925
- Sofia Championship
  - Champion (3): 1923, 1924, 1925
- Ulpia Serdika Cup
  - Winner (1): 1926
