= Tom Crouch =

Tom Crouch may refer to:

- Tom D. Crouch (born 1944), American aeronautics historian and curator
- Tom Crouch (footballer) (1916–1990), Australian rules footballer
