= Petar Ivanov =

Petar Ivanov may refer to:

- Petar Ivanov (rower) (1894–1961), Croatian rower
- Petar Ivanov (footballer) (1903–1968), Bulgarian footballer
- Petar Ivanov (wrestler) (born 1958), Bulgarian wrestler
