= Tsvetan Genev =

Bulgarian footballer

Personal information
- Date of birth: 13 November 1898
- Date of death: 4 March 1945 (aged 46)
- Position: Forward

International career
Years	Team	Apps	(Gls)
1924–1927	Bulgaria	3	(0)

Managerial career
- 1932–1933: Levski Sofia

Tsvetan Genev (13 November 1898 – 4 March 1945) was a Bulgarian footballer. He played in three matches for the Bulgaria national football team from 1924 to 1927. He was also part of Bulgaria's squad for the football tournament at the 1924 Summer Olympics, but he did not play in any matches. Genev coached Levski Sofia during their first ever championship title win in 1933. His father was the Bulgarian general Nikola Genev.

== Honours ==
Player

Levski Sofia

- Sofia Championship – 1923, 1924, 1925
- Ulpia Serdika Cup – 1926

Coach

Levski Sofia

- Bulgarian A PFG – 1933
- Sofia Championship – 1933
