= Bozhidar Iskrenov =

Bulgarian footballer

Bojidar Iskrenov
Personal information
- Full name: Bojidar Georgiev Iskrenov
- Date of birth: 1 August 1962 (age 64)
- Place of birth: Sofia, Bulgaria
- Height: 1.80 m (5 ft 11 in)
- Position: Attacking midfielder

Youth career
- 1971–1979: Levski Sofia

Senior career*
Years	Team	Apps	(Gls)
1979–1988	Levski Sofia	199	(58)
1989	Real Zaragoza	10	(1)
1989	Levski Sofia	9	(1)
1990–1991	Lausanne Sports	41	(7)
1991–1992	Botev Plovdiv	36	(4)
1993–1994	Shumen	17	(4)
1993	→ CSKA Sofia (loan)	22	(7)
1995	Septemvri Sofia	10	(2)
1995–1997	Washington Warthogs	68	(19)
Total		412	(85)

International career
1982–1983	Bulgaria U21	7	(1)
1983–1993	Bulgaria	50	(5)
- * Club domestic league appearances and goals

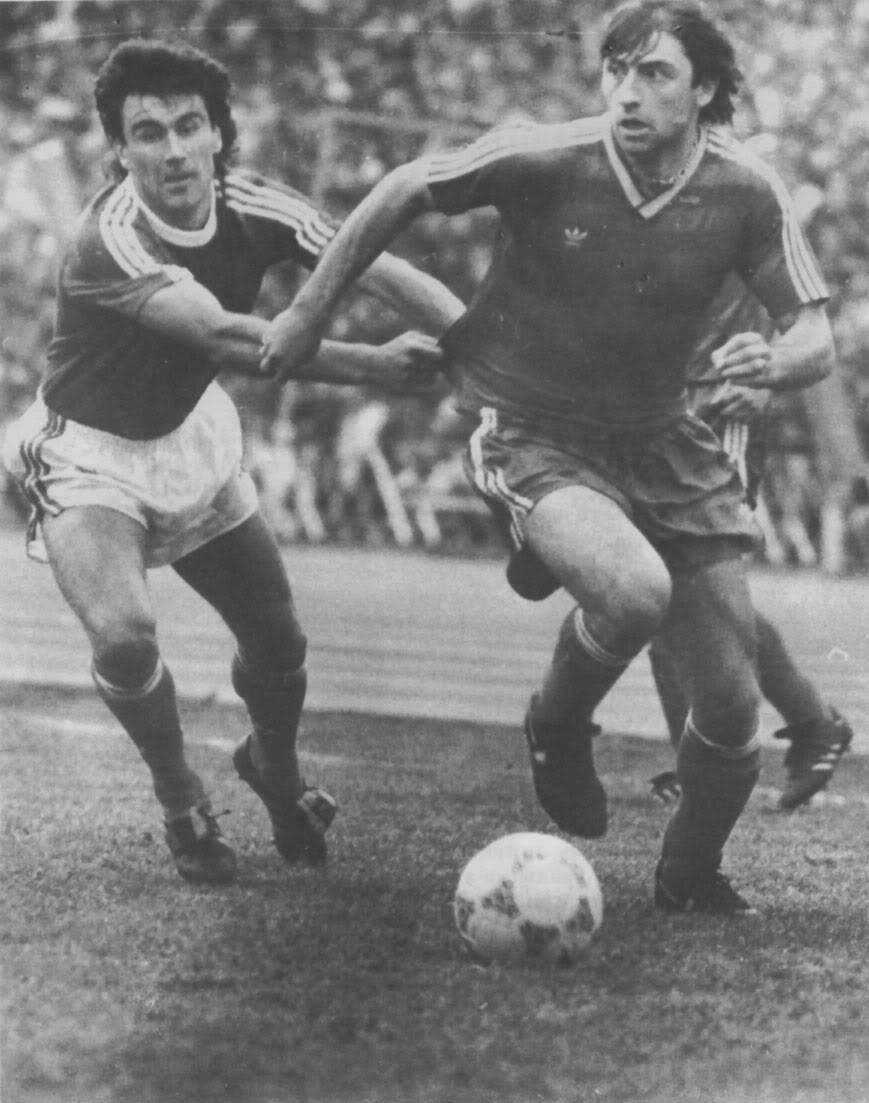
Iskrenov (in front)

Bojidar Georgiev Iskrenov (Bulgarian: Божидар Гeopгиeв Искренов, born 1 August 1962), nicknamed Gibona (Гибона means "The Gibbon"), Gibi (Гиби) and The Joy of the People (Радостта на народа), is a former Bulgarian footballer who spent most of his career playing for Levski Sofia as a forward.

Iskrenov also had a brief film career. He appeared in the movie Manevri na petiya etazh as the elevator technician.

== Career ==
A native of the capital Sofia, Iskrenov played for Levski between 1979 and 1989, scoring 58 goals in 208 matches. He was then transferred to the Spanish Real Zaragoza in 1989–1990, but could not establish himself in the first team and went on as a Lausanne Sports player in Switzerland in 1990–1991. Spells at Botev Plovdiv (1991–1992), CSKA Sofia and PFC Shumen (1994) followed, with Iskrenov ending his career at Septemvri Sofia (1994–1995).

Iskrenov won the top Bulgarian league, the A PFG, three times (all with Levski): in 1984, 1985 and 1988, as well as the Bulgarian Cup in 1982, 1984 and 1986 (with Levski) and 1993 (with CSKA). He played a total of 263 matches and scored 58 goals in the A PFG. A very skillful player, known for his feints as well as the ability to shoot with both legs, Iskrenov was also nicknamed Radostta na naroda (Радостта на народа; "The Joy of the people").

== International career ==
For the Bulgaria national team, Bojidar Iskrenov has 50 matches and 5 goals, debuting on 28 October 1981 in a 0–3 defeat by Brazil and retiring from international football on 12 May 1993 after a 2–2 draw between Bulgaria and Israel in Sofia. He played at the 1986 FIFA World Cup in Mexico, when Bulgaria reached the round of 16.

== Honors ==
Club

Levski Sofia

- Bulgarian League – 1979, 1984, 1985, 1988
- Bulgarian Cup – 1979, 1982, 1984, 1986
- Cup of the Soviet Army – 1984, 1987, 1988

CSKA Sofia

- Bulgarian Cup – 1992/1993

International

Bulgaria

- 1986 FIFA World Cup – 15th place
