= Kiril Yovovich =

Bulgarian footballer

Personal information
- Date of birth: 29 December 1905
- Place of birth: Sofia, Bulgaria
- Date of death: 9 February 1976 (aged 70)
- Position: Inside forward

Youth career
- –1919: FC Bulgaria
- 1919–1921: Levski Sofia

Senior career*
Years	Team	Apps	(Gls)
1921–1926	Levski Sofia	59	(32)

International career
1924–1926	Bulgaria		

Managerial career
- 1936–1937: Levski Sofia
- * Club domestic league appearances and goals

Kiril Yovovich (Bulgarian: Кирил Йовович) (29 December 1905 – 9 February 1976) was a Bulgarian footballer who played as an inside forward for Levski Sofia and Bulgaria during the 1920s. He was born in Sofia.

== Career ==
Yovovich start to play football in FC Bulgaria, before moved to Levski Sofia in 1919. With the Bulgarian national team he participated at the 1924 Summer Olympics.

== Career statistics ==
Club	Season	League	
Club	Season	Apps	Goals
Levski Sofia	1921–22	10	3
Levski Sofia	1922–23	8	6
Levski Sofia	1923–24	17	12
Levski Sofia	1924–25	17	6
Levski Sofia	1925–26	7	5
Career totals		59	32

== Honours ==
=== Player ===
Levski Sofia

- Bulgarian State Football Championship
  - Runner-up (1): 1925
- Sofia Championship
  - Champion (3): 1923, 1924, 1925
- Ulpia Serdika Cup
  - Winner (1): 1926

=== Manager ===
Levski Sofia

- Bulgarian State Football Championship
  - Champion (1): 1937
