= Nikolay Iliev =

Bulgarian footballer (born 1964)

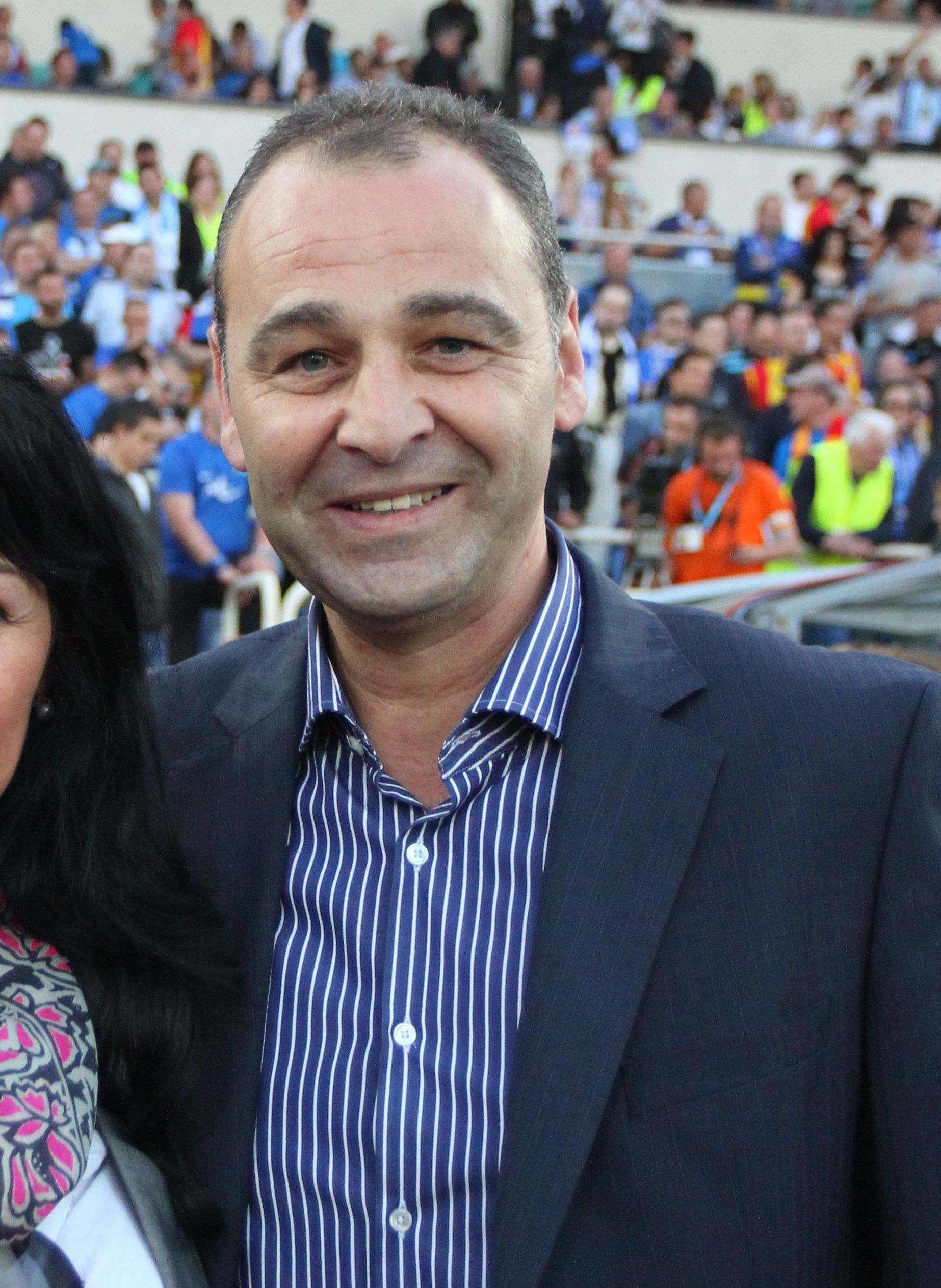
- Iliev in 2014

Personal information
- Full name: Nikolay Stefanov Iliev
- Date of birth: 31 March 1964 (age 62)
- Place of birth: Sofia, Bulgaria
- Height: 1.90 m (6 ft 3 in)
- Positions: Sweeper; centre back

Senior career*
Years	Team	Apps	(Gls)
1982–1989	Levski Sofia	182	(18)
1989–1991	Bologna	28	(3)
1991–1992	Hertha BSC	10	(1)
1992–1993	Levski Sofia	14	(7)
1993–1995	Stade Rennais	5	(0)
Total		239	(32)

International career
1986–1994	Bulgaria	53	(5)
- * Club domestic league appearances and goals

Nikolay Stefanov Iliev (Bulgarian: Николай Стефанов Илиев; born 31 March 1964) is a Bulgarian former professional footballer who played as a defender. He was part of the Bulgarian national team that reached the semi-finals of the 1994 World Cup. Iliev's spent most of his career with Levski Sofia, managing 196 appearances and 25 goals in the A PFG as well as participating in 19 matches and netting 2 goals in European tournaments. He also had a spell with Bologna in Serie A in the late 1980s and early 1990s, becoming the first Bulgarian footballer to ply his trade in the top Italian league.

== International goals ==
Scores and results list Bulgaria's goal tally first, score column indicates score after each Iliev goal.

List of international goals scored by Nikolay Iliev
No.	Date	Venue	Opponent	Score	Result	Competition
1	23 January 1988	Maktoum bin Rashid Al Maktoum Stadium, Dubai, United Arab Emirates	United Arab Emirates	1–0	3–0	Friendly match
2	24 May 1988	De Kuip, Rotterdam, Netherlands	Netherlands	1–1	2–1	Friendly match
3	22 March 1989	Vasil Levski National Stadium, Sofia, Bulgaria	West Germany	1–0	1–2	Friendly match
4	16 October 1991	Vasil Levski National Stadium, Sofia, Bulgaria	San Marino	4–0	4–0	Euro 1992 qualifier

== Honours ==
=== Club ===
Levski Sofia

- Champion of Bulgaria: 1984, 1985, 1988, 1993
- Bulgarian Cup: 1982, 1984, 1986, 1992
- Cup of the Soviet Army: 1984, 1987, 1988

=== International ===
Bulgaria

- FIFA World Cup: fourth place 1994

=== Individual ===
- Bulgarian Footballer of the Year: 1987
