= Aleksandar Hristov =

Bulgarian footballer

Personal information
- Date of birth: 31 May 1904
- Place of birth: Sofia, Bulgaria
- Date of death: 12 March 1992 (aged 87)
- Place of death: Sofia, Bulgaria

International career
Years	Team	Apps	(Gls)
- Bulgaria

Aleksandar Hristov (Bulgarian: Александър Христов, 31 May 1904 – 12 March 1992) was a Bulgarian footballer. He competed in the men's tournament at the 1924 Summer Olympics.

== Honours ==
Levski Sofia

- Bulgarian Championship – 1933
- Sofia Championship – 1923, 1924, 1925, 1929, 1933
- Ulpia Serdika Cup – 1926, 1930, 1931, 1932
