= Vasil Metodiev =

Bulgarian footballer (1935–2019)

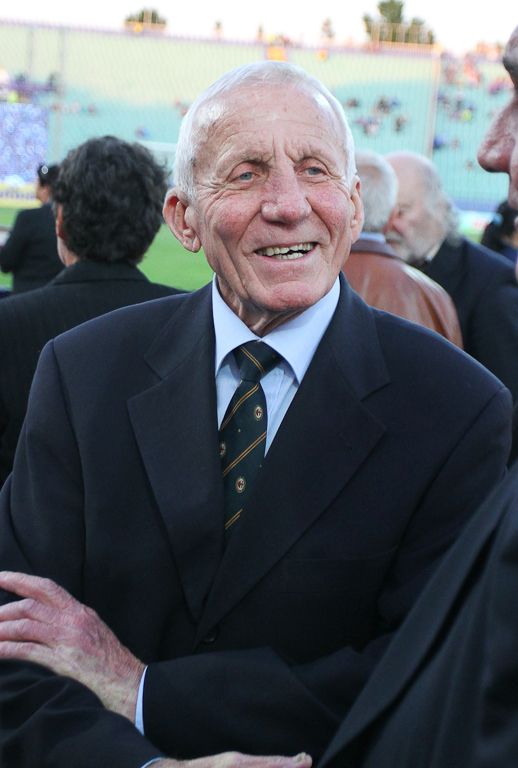

Personal information
- Date of birth: 6 January 1935
- Place of birth: Sandanski, Bulgaria
- Date of death: 29 July 2019 (aged 84)
- Place of death: Sofia, Bulgaria
- Position: Midfielder

Senior career*
Years	Team	Apps	(Gls)
1952–1955	Vihren Sandanski		
1956–1958	Akademik Sofia		
1959–1967	Lokomotiv Sofia	202	(14)
1967–1969	Dobrudzha Dobrich	53	(3)
1969–1971	Tundzha Yambol	21	(1)

International career
1960–1965	Bulgaria	17	(0)

Managerial career
- 1973: Lokomotiv Sofia
- 1978–1980: Lokomotiv Sofia
- 1981–1983: Pirin Blagoevgrad
- 1983–1985: Levski Sofia
- 1987–1988: Levski Sofia
- 1990–1991: Levski Sofia
- * Club domestic league appearances and goals

Vasil Metodiev (Bulgarian: Васил Методиев; (6 January 1935 – 29 July 2019), nicknamed Shpaydela, was a Bulgarian football midfielder who played for Bulgaria in the 1966 FIFA World Cup. He also played for Lokomotiv Sofia. He was the legendary coach of Levski Sofia, where he won three Bulgarian championships in 1984, 1985 and 1988, two Bulgarian Cup titles in 1984 and 1991, two Cup of the Soviet Army titles in 1984 and 1988, including one treble in 1984. During the 1984–85 season, as coach of Levski, he eliminated German champions VfB Stuttgart for the European Cup, which makes Metodiev the only Bulgarian coach to have knocked out a Bundesliga winner.
