= Dinny Fagan =

Australian rules footballer

Personal information
- Full name: Dennis Frederic Fagan
- Born: 17 March 1906; Chelsea, London
- Died: 18 September 1990 (aged 84); Point Lonsdale, Victoria
- Original team: Moorabbin
- Height: 180 cm (5 ft 11 in)
- Weight: 82 kg (181 lb)

Playing career^{1}
Years	Club	Games (Goals)
1929–1931	South Melbourne	19 (0)
- ^{1} Playing statistics correct to the end of 1931.

Dennis Frederic "Dinny" Fagan (17 March 1906 – 18 September 1990) was an Australian rules footballer who played for South Melbourne in the Victorian Football League (VFL).
