= Victor Hooper =

Australian cricketer

Personal information
- Born: 23 April 1905; Mount Stuart, Tasmania, Australia
- Died: 3 September 1990 (aged 85); New Town, Tasmania, Australia

Domestic team information
- Years: Team
- 1928-1933: Tasmania
- Source: Cricinfo, 4 March 2016

Victor Hooper (23 April 1905 – 3 September 1990) was an Australian cricketer. He played fourteen first-class matches for Tasmania between 1928 and 1933.

== See also ==
- List of Tasmanian representative cricketers
