= Mick Donohue =

Australian rules footballer, born 1917

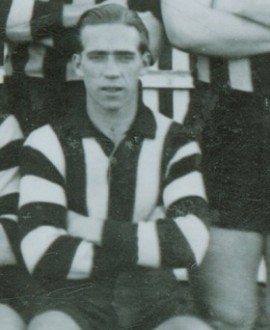
- Donohue in 1942

Personal information
- Full name: Mick Donohue
- Born: 2 August 1917
- Died: 15 September 1990 (aged 73)
- Original team: Victoria Brewery
- Height: 171 cm (5 ft 7 in)
- Weight: 67 kg (148 lb)

Playing career^{1}
Years	Club	Games (Goals)
1942–43	Collingwood	12 (3)
- ^{1} Playing statistics correct to the end of 1943.

Mick Donohue (2 August 1917 – 15 September 1990) was an Australian rules footballer who played with Collingwood in the Victorian Football League (VFL).
