= Vasile Moldovan =

Romanian gymnast

- Born: 28 August 1911 Cluj, Austria-Hungary
- Died: 5 September 1990 (aged 79)

Gymnastics career
- Discipline: Men's artistic gymnastics
- Country represented: Romania

Vasile Moldovan (28 August 1911 – 5 September 1990) was a Romanian gymnast. He competed in eight events at the 1936 Summer Olympics.
