= Konstantin Maznikov =

Bulgarian footballer

Personal information
- Date of birth: 5 April 1905
- Place of birth: Sofia, Bulgaria
- Date of death: 22 October 1967 (aged 62)
- Place of death: Sofia, Bulgaria

International career
Years	Team	Apps	(Gls)
- Bulgaria

Konstantin Maznikov (Bulgarian: Константин Мазников, 5 April 1905 – 22 October 1967) was a Bulgarian footballer. He competed in the men's tournament at the 1924 Summer Olympics.

== Honours ==
Levski Sofia
- Sofia Championship – 1923, 1924, 1925, 1929
- Ulpia Serdika Cup – 1926, 1930
