= Toon Duijnhouwer =

Dutch footballer

Personal information
- Full name: Anthony Duijnhouwer
- Date of birth: 3 June 1912
- Place of birth: Rotterdam, Netherlands
- Date of death: 8 September 1990 (aged 78)
- Position: Forward

Senior career*
Years	Team	Apps	(Gls)
1929–1934	Feijenoord		

International career
1933	Netherlands	1	(0)

Managerial career
- 1948–1949: Meerkerk
- 1956–1957: Zwartemeer
- * Club domestic league appearances and goals

Toon Duijnhouwer (3 June 1912 – 8 September 1990) was a Dutch footballer. He played in one match for the Netherlands national football team in 1933 against Belgium.

He later was head coach at amateur sides Meerkerk, OVV and Zwartemeer.
