= Ivan Radoev (footballer) =

Bulgarian footballer (1901–1985)

Personal information
- Date of birth: 9 September 1901
- Place of birth: Sofia, Bulgaria
- Date of death: 4 August 1985 (aged 83)
- Place of death: Sofia, Bulgaria

International career
Years	Team	Apps	(Gls)
- Bulgaria

Ivan Radoev (Bulgarian: Иван Радоев, 9 September 1901 – 4 August 1985) was a Bulgarian footballer. He competed in the men's tournament at the 1924 Summer Olympics.

== Honours ==
Player

Levski Sofia

- Sofia Championship: 1923, 1924, 1925
- Ulpia Serdika Cup: 1926

Coach

Levski Sofia

- Bulgarian A PFG: 1946, 1947, 1950
- Bulgarian Cup: 1946, 1947, 1950
- Sofia Championship: 1945, 1946, 1948

Bulgaria

- 1947 Balkan Cup: Fourth place
