= Lucien Konter =

Luxembourgish footballer

Personal information
- Date of birth: 12 August 1925
- Place of birth: Beckerich, Luxembourg
- Date of death: 20 September 1990 (aged 65)
- Place of death: Reus, Spain

International career
Years	Team	Apps	(Gls)
- Luxembourg

Lucien Konter (12 August 1925 – 20 September 1990) was a Luxembourgish footballer. He competed in the men's tournament at the 1948 Summer Olympics.
