= Ingvald Frøysa =

Norwegian footballer (1904-1990)

Personal information
- Date of birth: 12 June 1904
- Date of death: 30 September 1990 (aged 86)
- Position: Goalkeeper

International career
Years	Team	Apps	(Gls)
1927	Norway	1	(0)

Ingvald Frøysa (12 June 1904 – 30 September 1990) was a Norwegian footballer. He played in one match for the Norway national football team in 1927.
