= PFC Levski Sofia =

Bulgarian football club

Levski Sofia
- Full name: Професионален футболен клуб „Левски“ АД; Profesionalen futbolen klub "Levski" AD (Professional Football Club Levski AD)
- Nicknames: Сините / Sinite (The Blues); Отбора на народа / Otbora na naroda (The Team of the People); Синята лавина / Sinyata lavina (The Blue Avalanche)
- Founded: 24 May 1914; 112 years ago
- Ground: Stadion Georgi Asparuhov
- Capacity: 17,688
- Shareholders: Sofia Capital AD (86.6%); Association "Levski for the Levskars" (10%); Minority shareholders (3.4%)
- President: Nasko Sirakov
- Head coach: Julio Velázquez
- League: First League
- 2025–26: First League, 1st of 16 (champions)
- Website: levski.bg
Home colours	Away colours	Third colours

Profesionalen futbolen klub Levski (Bulgarian: Професионален футболен клуб „Левски“, lit. 'Professional Football Club Levski'), commonly known as Levski Sofia or simply Levski, is a Bulgarian professional association football club based in Sofia, which competes in the First League, the top division of the Bulgarian football league system. The club was founded on 24 May 1914 by a group of high school students, and is named after Vasil Levski, a Bulgarian revolutionary renowned as the national hero of the country.

Levski have won a total of 75 trophies, including 27 national championships, 26 national cups and 3 supercups, as well as 13 domestic doubles and one treble. They are the only Bulgarian football club to have never been relegated from the top division since the establishment of the league system in 1937. On the international stage, Levski reached the quarter-finals of the UEFA Cup twice and the quarter-finals of the Cup Winners' Cup three times. In addition, they finished as runners-up of the Balkans Cup twice, and in 2006, they became the first Bulgarian club to participate in the group stage of the UEFA Champions League.

The team's home kit colour is all-blue. Levski's home ground is the Georgi Asparuhov Stadium in Sofia, which has a capacity of 17,688 spectators. The club's fiercest rival is CSKA Sofia, and matches between the two capital sides are commonly referred to as the Eternal derby of Bulgaria. Levski also contests the Oldest capital derby with Slavia Sofia, since 1915. The club is a regular member of the European Club Association and the European Multisport Club Association.

== History ==
=== 1914–1969: Sports Club Levski ===
"At the founding meeting at the Hillock, I suggested Vasil Levski as our namesake because I didn't want foreign influence to our club's name, and because I admired the Apostle of Freedom and saw him as an example of bravery, agility and heroism, of boundless love for the people and willingness to sacrifice in the name of the people."

— Boris Vasilev, one of Levski's founders, on choosing the name for the club

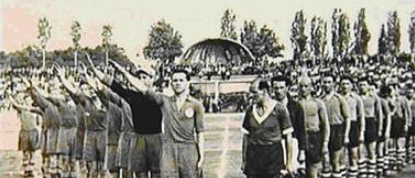
Makedonia Skopie (left) versus Levski (right), 1942 Bulgarian championship

First kit (1914–1920)

Sports Club Levski was founded in 1911 by a group of students from the Second Male High School in Sofia. The club's name was chosen in honour of the Bulgarian revolutionary Vasil Levski, and the club was officially registered on 24 May 1914.

In 1914, Levski lost its first official match against FK 13 Sofia with the score of 2–0. Between 1914 and 1920, football wasn't a popular sport in Bulgaria, and no additional information about the club exists. In the summer of 1921, the Sofia Sports League was established, which united ten clubs from Sofia and marked the beginning of organized football competitions in the city. Levski won the first match in the championship in the 1921–22 season, held on 18 September 1921, against Atletik Sofia with the score of 3–1. The team finished first in the league in 1923 after a 3–2 win over bitter rivals Slavia Sofia, and successfully defended the title in the following two seasons, in 1924 and 1925.

The first National Championship was held in 1924 with Levski representing Sofia. The team went on to win the title in 1933, 1937 and 1942, and established itself as the most popular football club in Bulgaria. In 1929, Levski became the first semi-professional football club in Bulgaria, after twelve players staged a boycott of the team in demand of financial remuneration and insurance benefits. The same year Levski met its first international opponents, losing to Gallipoli Istanbul 1–0 and winning against Kuban Istanbul 6–0. Between 1930 and 1932, Levski won the Ulpia Serdica Cup for three consecutive years and was permanently awarded the trophy as a result.

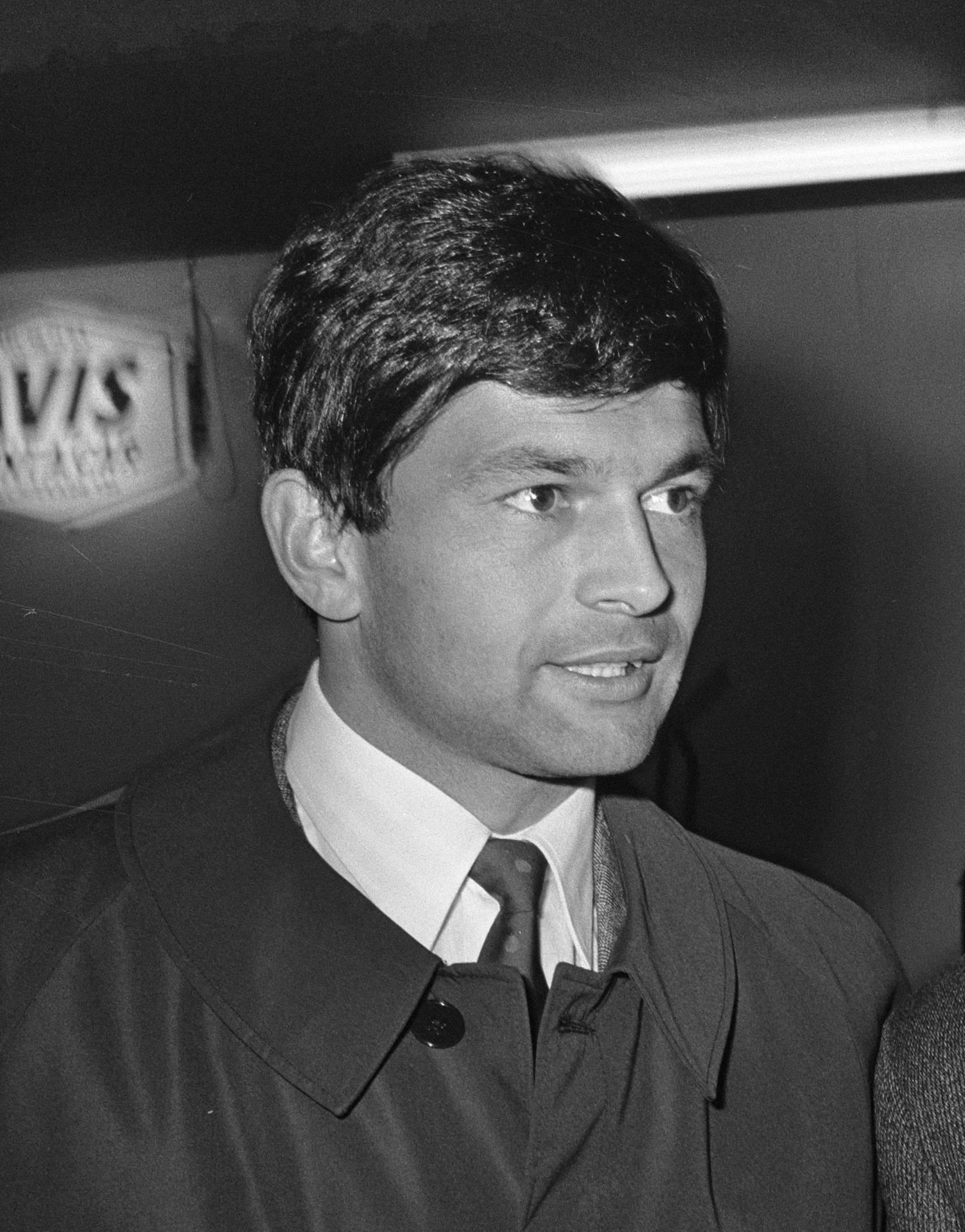
Georgi Asparuhov – "Gundi"

Levski kit during a large part of the 1940s–1960s

After World War II, Levski became one of the two top clubs in Bulgaria. After winning the championship in 1946, 1947, 1949, 1950 and 1953, Levski would not capture the domestic title again until the mid-1960s. In 1949, the authorities changed the club's name to Dinamo following the Soviet traditions, but after the de-Stalinization of Bulgaria, it was reverted in 1957. The 1960s were marked with return to success both on the domestic and on the international stage. Levski's academy would become the most successful in national youth competitions for the years to come, and the results were first seen in the likes of Georgi Asparuhov, Georgi Sokolov, Biser Mihaylov, Kiril Ivkov, Ivan Vutsov, Stefan Aladzhov and Aleksandar Kostov, assisted by experienced veterans like Stefan Abadzhiev, Dimo Pechenikov and Hristo Iliev, which resulted in winning the championship in 1965, 1968 and 1970, including the 7–2 triumph over new bitter rivals CSKA Sofia in 1968. In the 1965–66 European Cup, Levski was eliminated in the first round by Benfica with 5–4 on aggregate.

=== 1969–1985: Levski-Spartak ===
In January 1969, Levski was forcibly merged with Spartak Sofia by the Bulgarian Communist Party, and put under the auspice of the Ministry of Interior Affairs. The name of the club was once again changed, this time to Levski-Spartak.

A new crop of youngsters in the likes of Kiril Milanov, Dobromir Zhechev, Pavel Panov, Stefan Pavlov, Yordan Yordanov, Stefan Staykov, Tomas Lafchis, Todor Barzov, Voyn Voynov, Georgi Tsvetkov, Plamen Nikolov, and Rusi Gochev not only found their place in the first team, but brought new league titles in 1974, 1977, 1979, 1984 and 1985. On the international stage, the team reached the quarter-finals of the European Cup Winners' Cup in 1969–70 and 1976–77, and the quarter-finals of the UEFA Cup in 1975–76. In the latter, Levski defeated Barcelona 5–4 in the second leg, becoming one of the two European teams (joined by Bayern Munich in 2020) to have scored five or more goals in one match against the Spanish giants in official UEFA competitions. Additionally, Levski became the only Bulgarian club to eliminate a German champion after defeating VfB Stuttgart in the first round of the 1984–85 European Cup. They also eliminated Stuttgart a year earlier in the first round of the 1983–84 UEFA Cup.

=== 1985–1989: Vitosha Sofia ===
The name of the team was changed to Vitosha by the authorities following the disruptions during and after the Bulgarian Cup final in 1985. The game ran on high emotions fuelled by the streak of consecutive victories of Levski over CSKA in the two years prior to the game. During the game, which CSKA won 2–1, there were confrontations both on the field and on the stands. By decree of the Central Committee of the Bulgarian Communist Party, some of the leading players of both clubs were suspended from the sport for life. The championship title of the club for 1985 was suspended. However, the suspensions were lifted shortly after. Levski won another cup and league titles in 1986 and 1988, respectively. The fourth European quarter-final came in 1986–87, when Levski knocked out the 1985–86 Danish Cup winners Boldklubben 1903 and the 1985–86 Yugoslav Cup holders Velež Mostar, before losing to the 1985–86 Copa del Rey winners Real Zaragoza.

Starting lineup versus Schalke 04 (2006 UEFA Cup quarter-final, first leg)

=== 1989–2009: Return of Levski Sofia and the Blue Tale ===
After the 1989–90 season, the club regained its original name. The team was made up of players such as Plamen Nikolov, Petar Hubchev, Tsanko Tsvetanov, Emil Kremenliev, Zlatko Yankov, Georgi Slavchev, Ilian Iliev, Daniel Borimirov, Stanimir Stoilov, Velko Yotov, Plamen Getov, Nikolay Todorov and Nasko Sirakov, and won three consecutive domestic national championships in 1993, 1994 and 1995. Levski have contributed a record seven players to the Bulgaria national team that finished fourth at the 1994 FIFA World Cup.

In 2005–06, Levski reached the quarter-finals of the 2005–06 UEFA Cup after knocking out the 2004–05 Coupe de France winners Auxerre in the first round, finishing above SC Heerenveen, Dinamo București and the reigning title holders CSKA Moscow in the group stage, triumphing over Champions League participants Artmedia Bratislava and Udinese in the knockout stages, before being eliminated by Schalke 04.

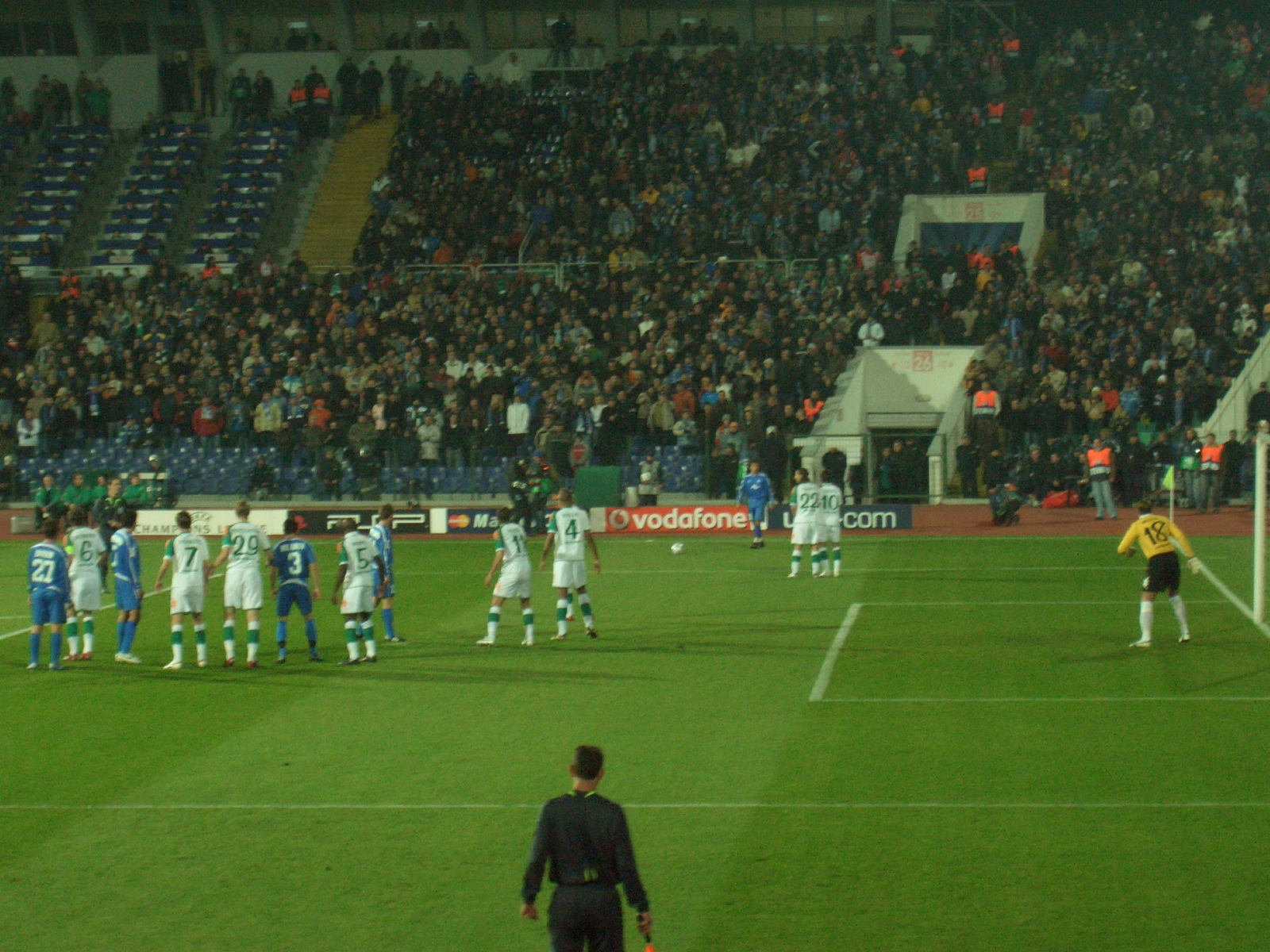
Levski against Werder Bremen at the National Stadium in the Champions League

Levski, as the champions of Bulgaria, started their 2006–07 UEFA Champions League participation in the second qualifying round, where they eliminated Georgian champions Sioni Bolnisi, defeating them 2–0 both home and away. In the third round, Levski faced the Italian team Chievo Verona, which took part in the tournament because of other clubs' sanctions as part of the 2006 Serie A matchfixing scandal. Levski eliminated Chievo after a decisive 2–0 win in Sofia and a 2–2 draw in Verona, and thus became the first Bulgarian club to ever reach the group stage of the UEFA Champions League. There, they faced the title holders Barcelona, Premier League champions Chelsea, and Bundesliga runners-up Werder Bremen. They lost all six games and scored only one goal, in the second round against Chelsea.

Levski's UEFA Cup run and the consequent participation in the Champions League group stage were considered the club's greatest European successes in the 21st century, hence the period of their occurrence (2005–2007) was informally called the Blue Tale.

Levski earned a place in the 2008–09 UEFA Champions League after the Bulgarian league champions CSKA Sofia failed to obtain a UEFA license. Levski lost to BATE Borisov of Belarus in the third qualifying round.

=== 2009–2020: Downfall ===
During the 2009–10 season, Levski's team started their European campaign with a 9–0 (on aggregate) win against UE Sant Julià in the second qualifying round of the 2009–10 UEFA Champions League. In the next round, Levski Sofia faced FK Baku, eliminating the team from Azerbaijan with 2–0 on aggregate. In the play-off round, Levski was eliminated by Debrecen with 4–1 on aggregate. As one of the play-off losers, Levski qualified for the 2009–10 UEFA Europa League. In the group stage, Levski faced Villarreal, Lazio and Red Bull Salzburg. Levski achieved only one win and five defeats. Levski won against Lazio in Italy, after Hristo Yovov scored the winning goal in the match.

Levski started the 2010–11 season with a match against Dundalk, in a second qualifying round of the 2010–11 UEFA Europa League. Levski won the first match 6–0. In the return leg at Oriel Park, Levski defeated Dundalk 2–0 with two first half goals from Garra Dembélé. In the next round Levski played against Kalmar FF. The first match ended 1–1 in Sweden. In the return leg in Sofia, Levski won 5–2. In between, The Blues defeated their archrival CSKA Sofia in the Eternal derby with 1–0. Their next match in the Europa League saw them eliminate Swedish champions AIK 2–1 on aggregate, with goals scored by Daniel Mladenov and Garra Dembélé as Levski reached the Europa League group stage. Levski was drawn in Group C, facing Gent, Lille and Sporting CP. The first match was played against Gent at home, which Levski won 3–2 with the winning goal scored by Serginho Greene. With this win, Levski recorded eight consecutive games without defeat in European competitions. After that, Levski lost to Sporting CP with 5–0, followed by another defeat against Lille. In return leg in Sofia, Levski was leading 2–1 against Lille until Ivo Ivanov scored an own goal late in the game to make it 2–2. In the last match of the Group C, Levski won 1–0 against Sporting CP with the goal scored by Daniel Mladenov, but it wasn't enough for them to qualify for the knockout stage.

In the following 2011–12 season, in the third qualifying round of the Europa League, Levski were eliminated by Spartak Trnava of Slovakia, following a late game 2–1 win in Sofia, and a loss of the same scoreline in Trnava. The penalty shoot-out costed Levski a place in the play-off round. This caused an upset with the fans and players, and the team barely clinched the fourth place at the winter break in the Bulgarian league. Albeit only three points from the leaders Ludogoretz Razgrad, the acting manager Georgi Ivanov was sacked from the position, but remained at the club as a sporting director. Nikolay Kostov was appointed the new manager of the club, giving the supporters a sense of optimism, which, however, faded after a cup knock-out in the hands of Lokomotiv Plovdiv and a home defeat to Minyor Pernik. Kostov handed in his resignation, leaving the managerial post once again vacant. Sporting director Georgi Ivanov once again stepped in to help the club, and accepted being the manager until the summer break, when a new one would be appointed.

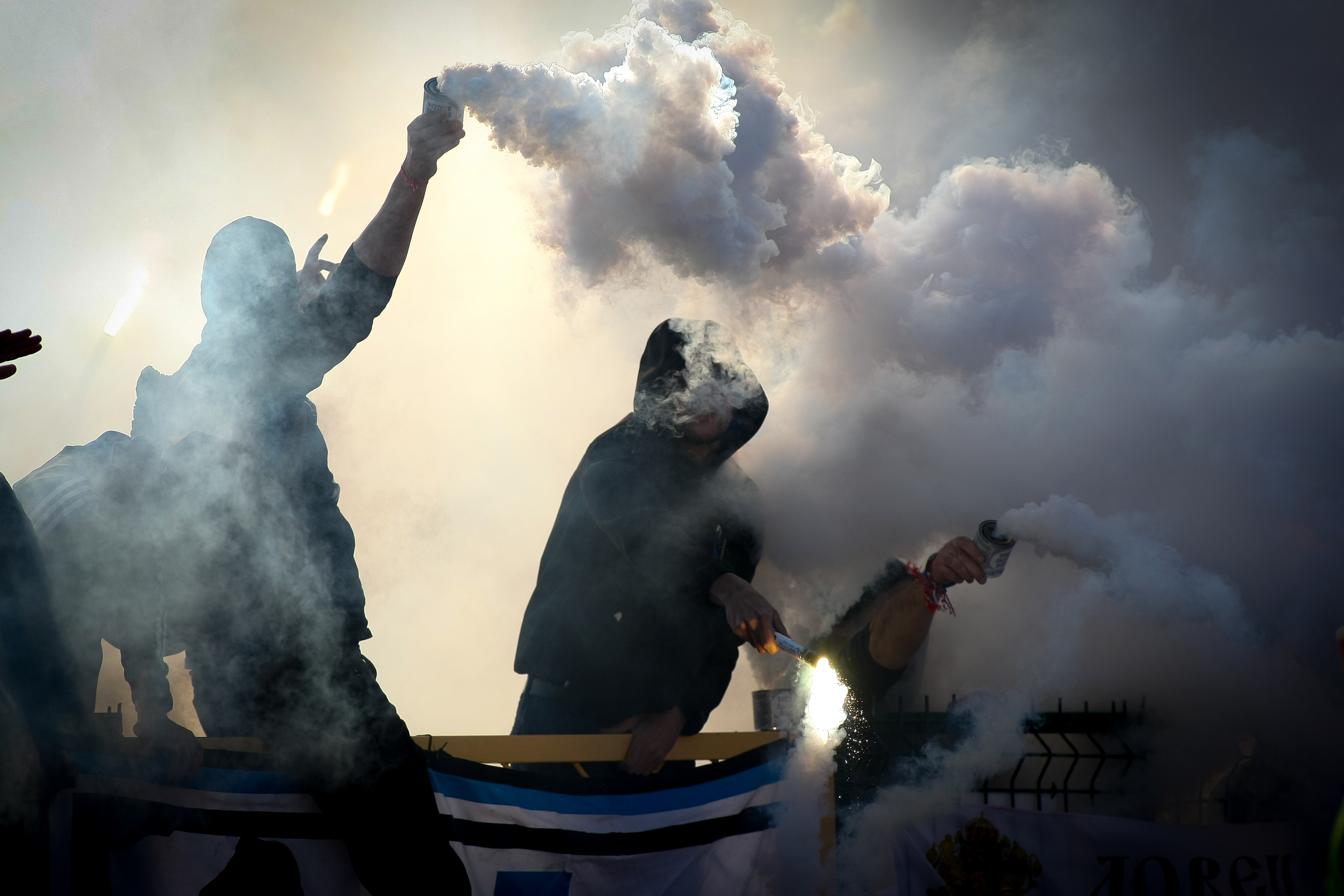
Levski Sofia ultras during a derby match against CSKA Sofia

During the summer of 2012, former player Ilian Iliev was appointed the new manager of the club. Under his management, Levski was knocked out from the Europa League by Bosnian side FK Sarajevo. Iliev led the team to 13 league victories and to the semi-finals of the Bulgarian Cup after eliminating Cherno More Varna and Litex Lovech on the away goals rule. Iliev however was sacked after a 1–1 away draw against Pirin Gotse Delchev. Assistant manager Nikolay Mitov took over the team until the end of the season. Under his management Levski won the derby clashes against Litex, CSKA and Ludogorets but failed to win the title after a 1–1 home draw against Slavia Sofia. Levski also reached their first Bulgarian Cup final since 2007, but lost on penalties against Beroe Stara Zagora. Despite the missed opportunity of winning a trophy, Mitov's contract was renewed for the 2013–14 season. However, the team made another disappointing performance in Europa League, being eliminated by the Kazakh side Irtysh Pavlodar. As a result, Nikolay Mitov resigned as manager.

In July 2013, Slaviša Jokanović was appointed as the new manager of the team. Despite losing only two matches in twelve games, Jokanović was released in October 2013. Ivaylo Petev was announced as his successor but during his introduction a few Levski supporters interrupted it, stating that they would not accept his appointment. The next day, Petev refused to take charge of the team and Antoni Zdravkov was named as the new manager. Under his reign the team suffered a heavy 3–0 loss against rivals CSKA, but managed to knock them out in the Bulgarian Cup in December 2013 after penalties. Due to the difficult financial situation, a few key players, such as Antonio Vutov and Garry Rodrigues, were sold to Udinese and Elche, respectively, during the winter break. This reflected on the team's performance and Levski finished fifth and got knocked out in the quarter-finals of the Bulgarian Cup by Botev Plovdiv. Antoni Zdravkov was sacked in March 2014, and Levski legend Elin Topuzakov took charge as a caretaker until the end of the 2013–14 season. The club did not participate in European competitions for the first time since 1990–91.

On 23 May 2014, the club supporters organized a friendly game against Lazio, marking the 100th anniversary of the club. Club icons like Georgi Ivanov, Dimitar Ivankov, Aleksandar Aleksandrov, Hristo Yovov, Elin Topuzakov and many other former players and celebrities took participation by playing in the game, as well as donating money for the event's organization. The next day, Levski marked 100 years since its founding.

The following years were arguably the darkest in the club's history. League-wise, Levski managed to finish higher than third place only once (runners-up in 2015–16), and achieved its lowest ever ranking (seventh place in 2014–15, followed by eighth in 2020–21). On the stage of the Bulgarian Cup, the club lost two more finals, in 2015 to Cherno More and in 2018 to Slavia Sofia. In European competitions, Levski faced some of its most unexpected eliminations – against Liechtenstein side FC Vaduz and Cypriot AEK Larnaca, the latter inflicting the largest ever European defeat on aggregate for Levski (7–0).

These years were turbulent not only on the football pitch, but at the higher hierarchy of the club. In June 2015, the long-time president Todor Batkov stepped down and the club was taken over by Ivo Tonev, Aleksandar Angelov and Nikolay Ivanov. From this point onwards, Levski began to experience financial problems. Tonev, Angelov and Ivanov's reign was short-lived and in August 2016, they transferred their shares to businessman Spas Rusev. Under his governance, Levski signed players like Gabriel Obertan and Jordi Gómez, as well as coach Delio Rossi, in an attempt to return the club's glory. However, Rusev's financing was dubious, and there were complaints for delayed wages. In February 2017, Rusev admitted the club was "practically bankrupt". On 9 February 2019, Rusev stepped down as owner of Levski, leaving the club with more than 30 million BGN in debt. Four days later, businessman and former owner of archrivals CSKA Vasil Bozhkov took over the club. He attempted to stabilize Levski's financial situation by immediately covering the most urgent obligations and selling or releasing the players with the highest wages, investing around 25 million BGN in total throughout his tenure. In February 2020, Bozhkov stepped down as his main business, 7777.bg (National Lottery), had its license withdrawn by the Bulgarian government. The club being left with no financing whatsoever and in a full-scale financial crisis, sparkled an unprecedented support campaign amongst the fans, who engaged in various donation initiatives, raising 2.6 million BGN in the span of five months.

In 2021, former owner Vasil Bozhkov admitted that he was forced to take over Levski under the threat of business closure by prime minister Boyko Borisov. Bozhkov's confession was somewhat of a confirmation of the insinuation that the reason behind Levski's financial problems and occasional ownership changes was Borisov's idea of using the club as an instrument for political influence.

=== 2020–present: Return of Sirakov and Stoilov ===
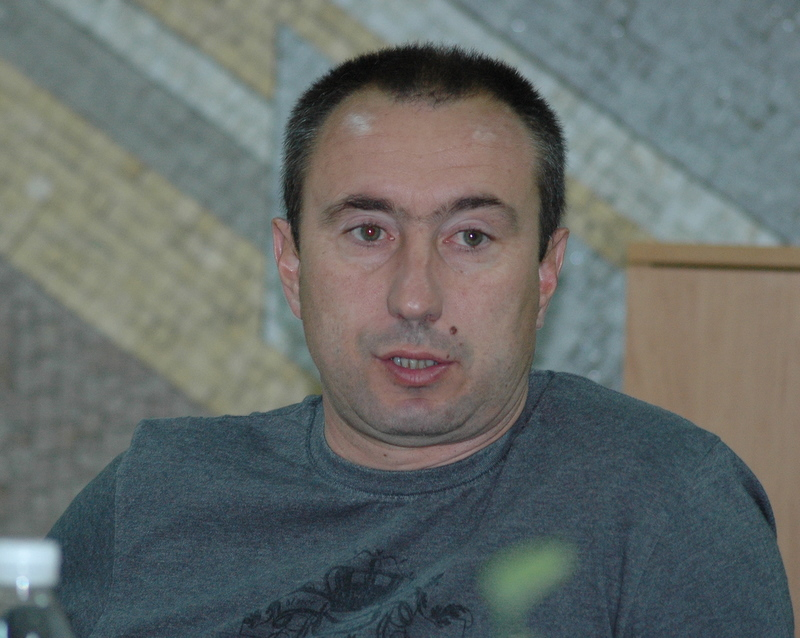
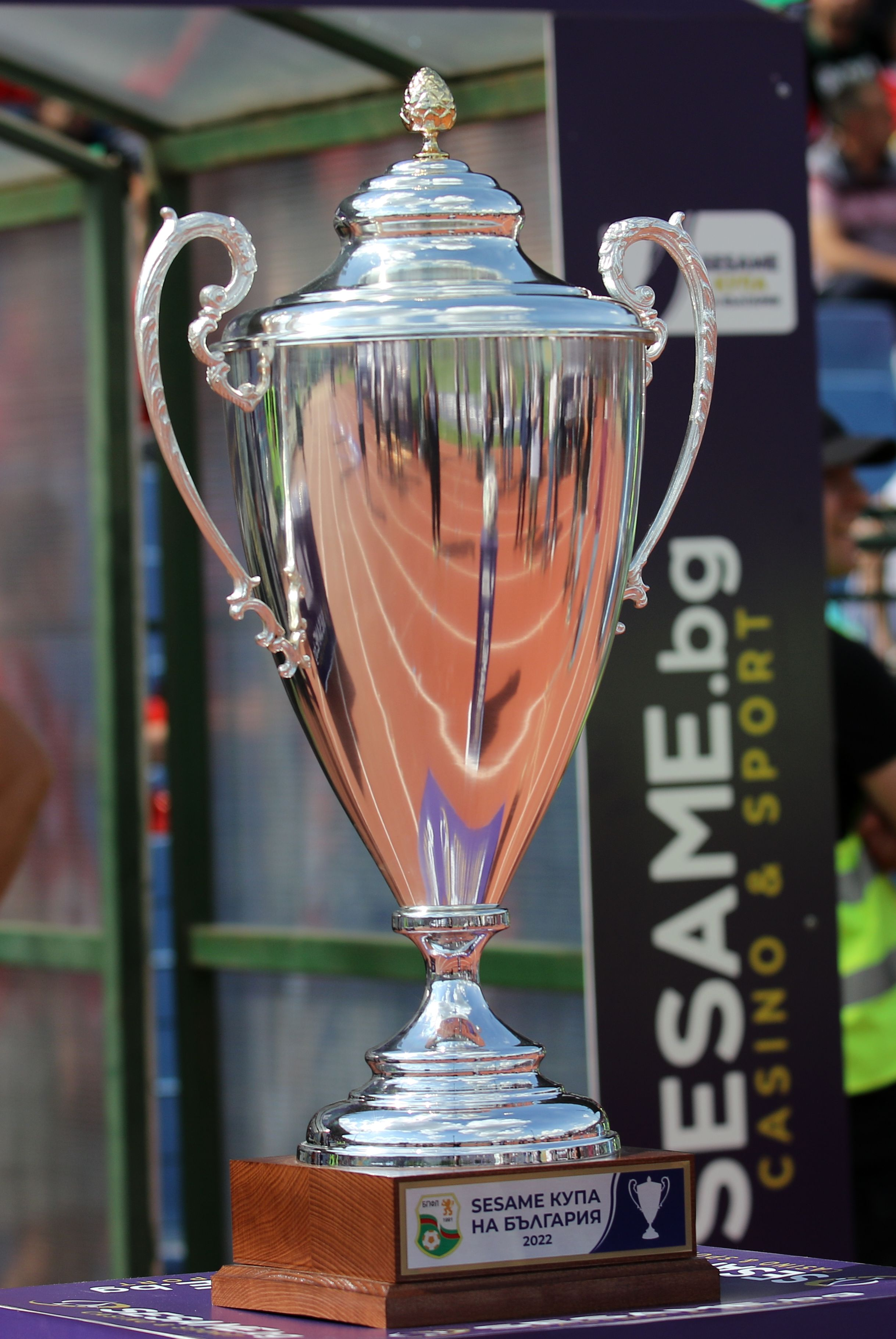
Stanimir Stoilov (left) and the 2022 Bulgarian Cup trophy (right), won by Levski in May 2022

In the summer of 2020, club legend Nasko Sirakov took charge of the majority of shares and the club made some financial cuts, forcing a big part of the players (mainly foreigners) to leave. Levski also changed its transfer policy, signing mainly Bulgarian and homegrown players with lower salaries, allowing the club to start paying off some of the debt accumulated throughout the years. Sirakov set a target for the club to clear most of the debt by 2023, mostly through sponsorship deals, outgoing transfers, television rights and the fans' financial support.

On 1 September 2021, Sirakov announced the return of the club's most successful manager in the 21st century, also known as the "author" of the Blue Tale, Stanimir Stoilov. At that time, Levski was in 10th place in the league standings with four defeats and two wins in the first six games. With his arrival, Stoilov released three players – Simeon Slavchev, Valeri Bojinov and Hristofor Hubchev, and signed José Córdoba from Etar and Dimitar Kostadinov from Septemvri Sofia. Under his management, the team managed to improve promptly, earning 20 points by the end of the half-season with 5 wins, 5 draws, and 3 defeats.

On 15 May 2022, Levski won the Bulgarian Cup by defeating its biggest rivals CSKA 1–0 in the final, thus ending the club's longest ever trophyless period (13 years). It was a record 26th cup for the Blues. By winning the cup, the team earned a place in the UEFA Europa Conference League qualifications. In the second qualifying round, they faced PAOK, who reached the quarter-finals of the same competition the previous season. Despite being considered underdogs, Levski managed to eliminate the Greek team 3–1 on aggregate. However, Levski crashed out of the tournament in the third qualifying round after an upsetting home defeat on penalties at the hands of Maltese side Ħamrun Spartans.

== Club symbols ==
=== Names and crests ===
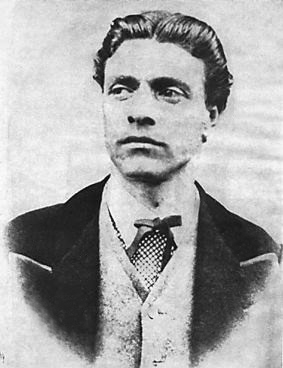
Vasil Levski, club's patron

The first club crest was designed by Mincho Kachulev in 1922. Initially in the size of a square with a blue background, it was intentionally written in a stylized letter "Л" (Bulgarian letter "L"; shortened for Levski). The inner space of the letter was filled vertically equally in yellow and red colours. In a later period of time, the Cyrillic letters "С" (Sport) and "К" (club) were added at the top of the square, while the bottom side was inscribed with the name "Sofia". This badge was used by the club until 1949, when it was renamed to Dinamo.

From 1949 to 1956, the emblem of the club was an irregular hexagon filled with vertical red, white, blue and yellow colours, with an inscribed handwritten Cyrillic letter "Д", alongside a five-pointed red star above it and the word "Sofia" underneath. From 1957 to 1968 the original logo of the club was restored, however the letters "C" and "К" were replaced with "Ф" (Athletic) and "Д" (union).

After the merger with Spartak Sofia in 1969, the club crest became a shield in blue and white with a horizontal red bar above. The shield spawned the letters "Л" and "C", an abbreviation of the new name Levski-Spartak. The football club used this crest until 1985, when it was renamed Vitosha. Vitosha's crest was in the form of a stylized letter "C" surrounding the football in the upper curve of the letter, coloured in blue and white.

In January 1990, the club restored its original name and original logo, and the letters "C" and "K" in the upper corner of the blue square were replaced with the initials "Ф" (football) and "K" (club). However, due to legal issues with the ownership of the rights to the historic crest, the club was forced to change it in 1998, when a brand new shield logo was introduced, entirely in blue. At its centre, an inscription of the letter "Л" was introduced, alongside the year of establishment – 1914. The dome of the shield was labelled "PFC Levski".

After winning the legal dispute for the rights to the historic emblem in 2006, the club decided to use the two different crests simultaneously for a brief period of time. Later that year, the shield crest was replaced by the classic square emblem.

In 2014, for the club's 100th anniversary, Levski introduced a new version of the classic square emblem, with laurel branches surrounding the emblem and the year of establishment – 1914 – at the bottom.

The Cyrillic letter Л (L) is used today on the club's kits as a logo and on its social media channels.

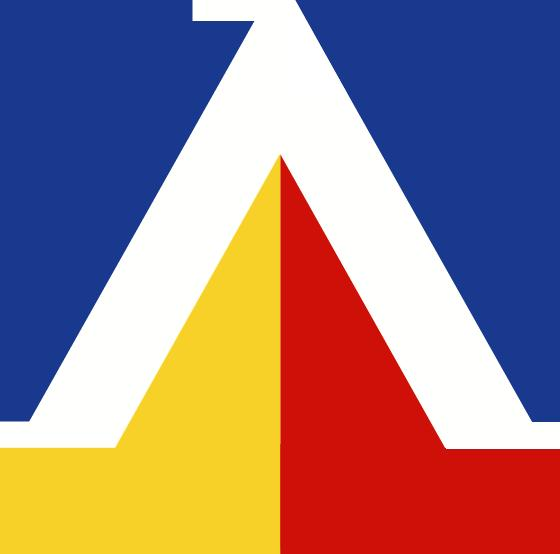
First crest (1922)

Sports Club Levski Sofia (1923–1944)

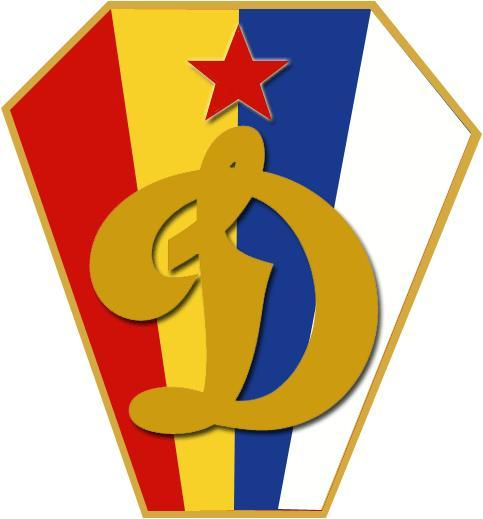
Dinamo Sofia (1949–1957)

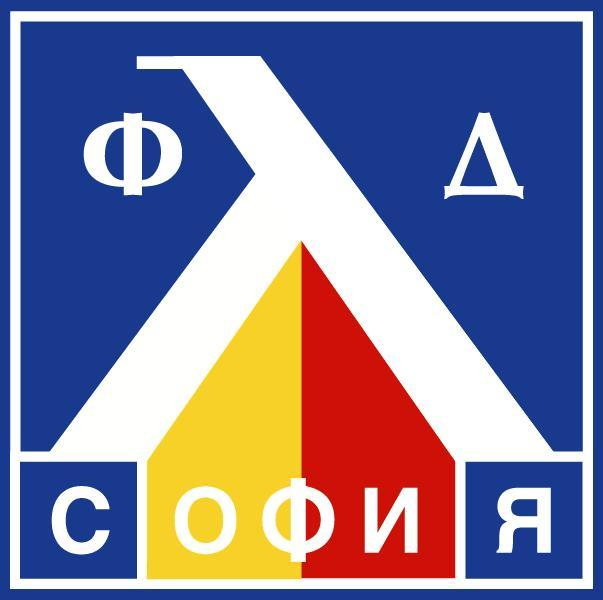
Athletic Union Levski Sofia (1957–1969)

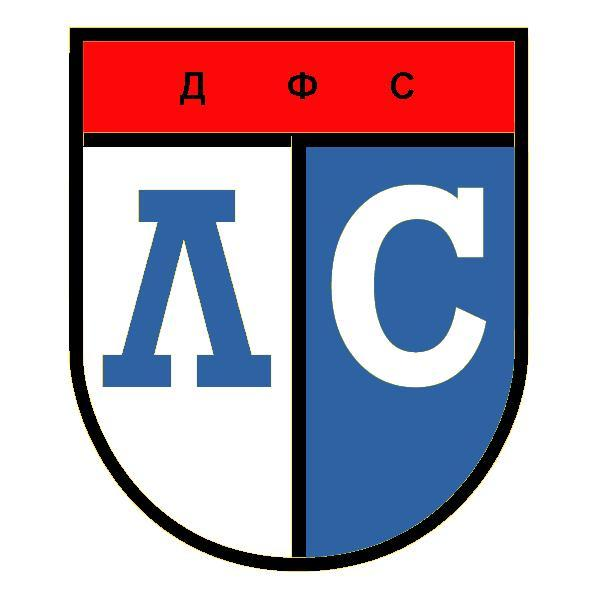
State Athletic Union Levski-Spartak (1969–1985)

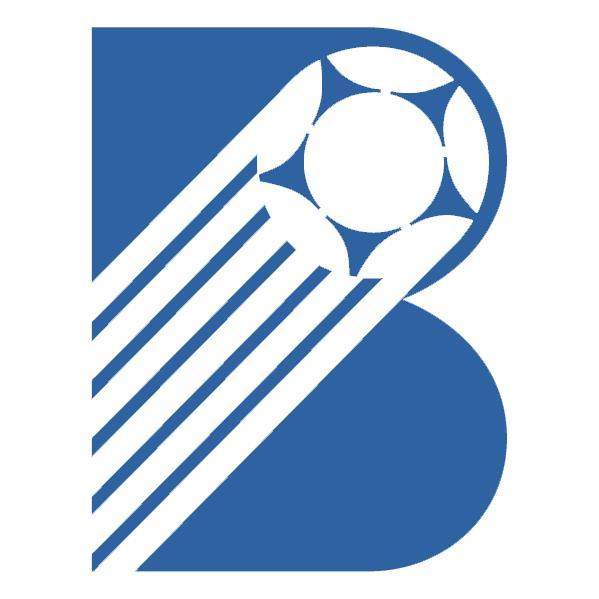
Vitosha Sofia (1985–1989)

PFC Levski 1914 (1998–2006)

Levski Sofia 1914 (2014–2026)

=== Club anthem ===
The first anthem of Levski was written by renowned Bulgarian poet Dimcho Debelyanov and composed by Lyubomir Pipkov. Since 1999, the club anthem is "Само Левски шампион" (Come on Levski, you champion), composed by Stefan Dimitrov.

== Stadium ==
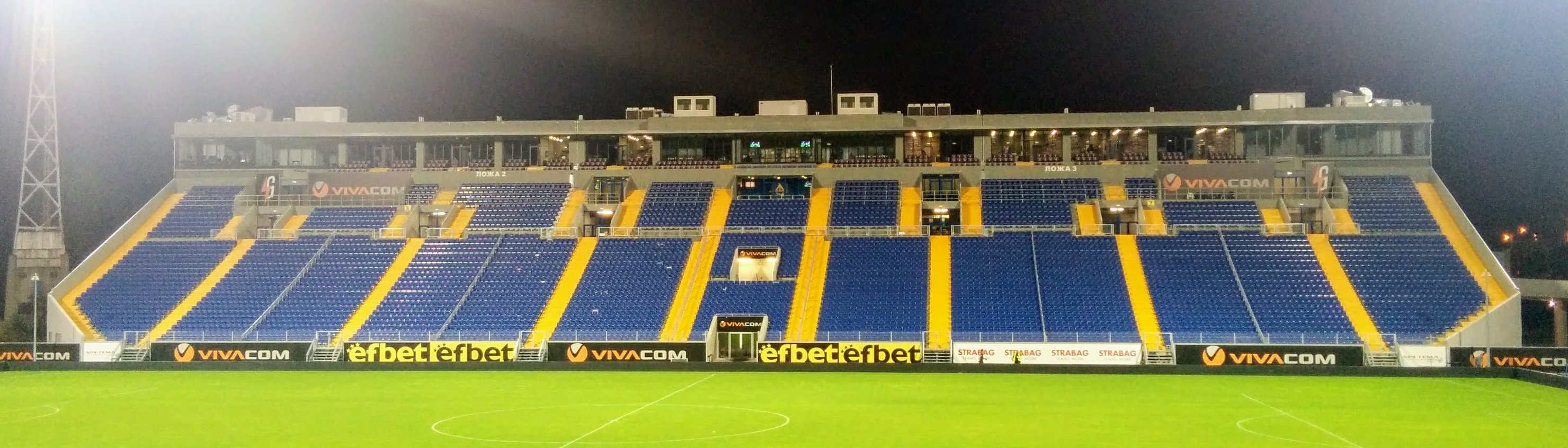
Gerena

Initially, the club did not possess a field of its own and training was held on an empty space called The Hillock (Могилката/Mogilkata), where the National Palace of Culture was built later. In 1924, the Sofia Municipality provided the club with the rights to an empty field on what were then the outskirts of the city, and a decade later the stadium named Levski Playing Field was finally completed. It provided for 10,000 spectators and was regarded as the finest sport facility in the city.

In 1949, the stadium was nationalized and later the Vasil Levski National Stadium was built on the site. The team played in various locations (including the nearby Yunak Stadium) before moving to the Dinamo ground, which was located at the site of the modern Spartak swimming complex. In 1961, after districting, the team moved to Suhata Reka neighborhood, where a new stadium was built by 1963, which was later renamed in 1990 in honour of former Levski player Georgi Asparuhov.

In 1999, the stadium underwent extensive reconstruction with a capacity of 29,000 spectators. The field measures 105 x 68 metres. However, the team plays most of its important international matches on the national stadium Vasil Levski. On one occasion, the former club president Todor Batkov had demanded that Levski should receive Stadion Rakovski on loan. The demand was on grounds that the first club stadium was nationalized and Levski had never been repaid.

In October 2012, it was announced that Levski would be renovating their stadium. The first phase of the planned reconstruction was to be completed in 2014, on the centennial of the club's foundation. As of 2013, the capacity was reduced to 19,000 due to the undergoing reconstruction of the main stand. On 5 July 2013, the first step was made in the construction of the main stand, which has a capacity of 6,000 spectators and meets all the requirements of UEFA for the convenience of fans. The stadium's main stand was officially opened on 23 April 2016 at a special ceremony. Since 2019, the Museum of Glory of Levski Sofia is also located at the stadium.

== Supporters ==
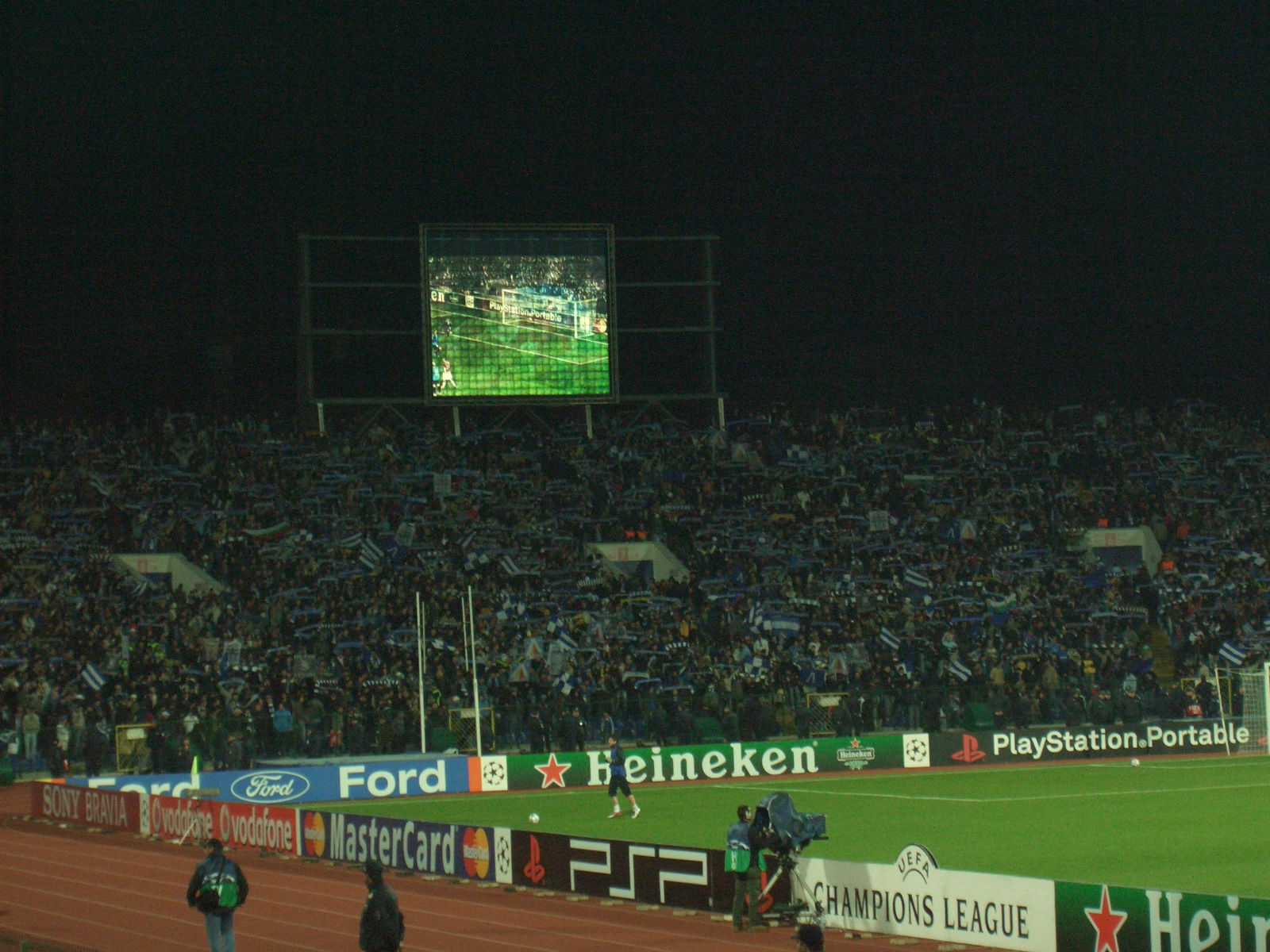
Sector B in 2006

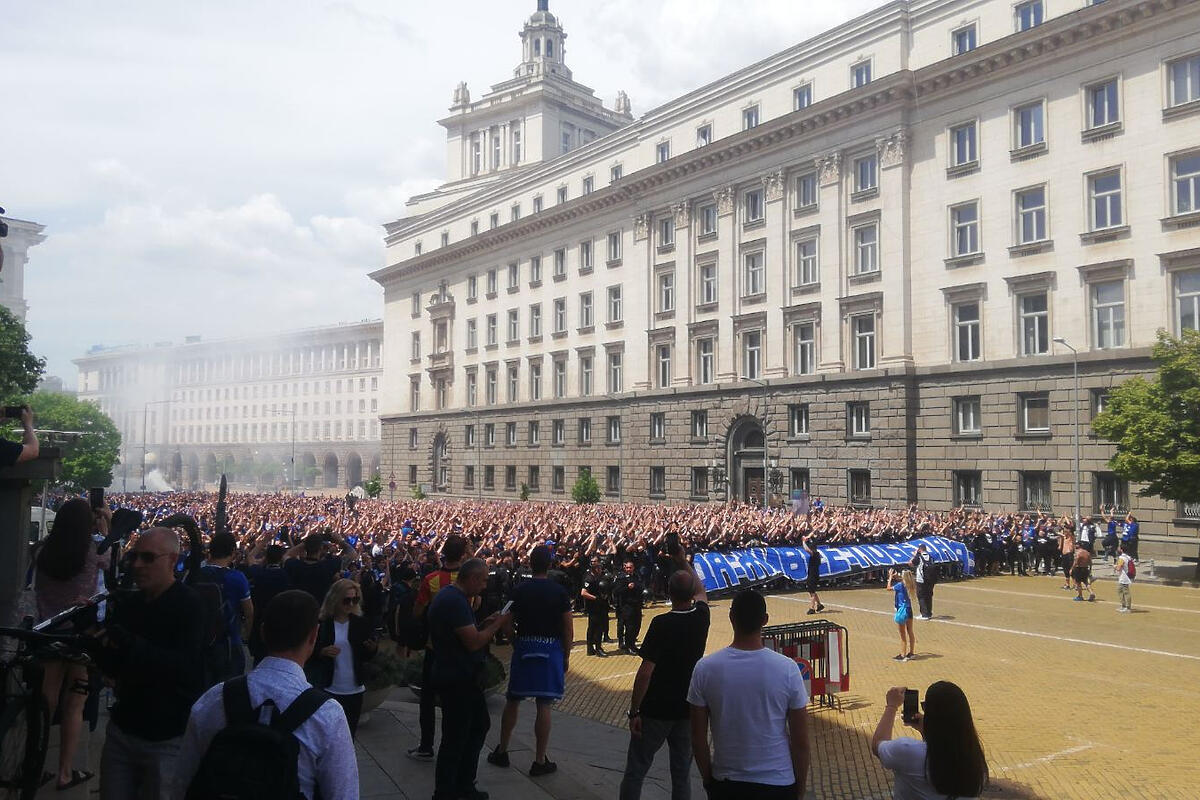
Sector B in 2022

Historically, Levski Sofia fans gathered in the south stand of the stadium. This tradition is believed to have its roots in the Sofia Derby, when Levski fans would meet before matches in an area near the southern end of the Vasil Levski National Stadium. Due to the orientation of the stadium and the naming conventions of the stands in most Bulgarian stadiums, Sector B has become synonymous with Levski fans. Recently, fans in Sector B have been seen as part of the ultras movement, which is popular in the Balkans. Today, Sector B initiates most of the songs, choreographies and pyrotechnics at Levski's matches.

Levski supporters are organized by fan clubs, most notably the National Supporters Club, which assists and coordinates fans from all over Bulgaria and supports the organization of events. There are also notable groups from Sofia (Sofia-West, South Division, Blue Junta, HD Boys, LSL and more) and other cities across Bulgaria and globally. Ultras Levski have a long-standing friendship with Lazio fans. According to a study performed for UEFA, Levski is the most popular Bulgarian club and share the sixth position in Europe with Juventus, by percentage of support in its own country (31%).

== Players ==
=== First team ===
As of 21 November 2026

Note: Flags indicate national team as defined under FIFA eligibility rules; some limited exceptions apply. Players may hold more than one non-FIFA nationality.

No.	Pos.	Nation	Player
1	GK	BUL	Ognyan Vladimirov
2	DF	BRA	Hevertton
3	DF	BRA	Maicon
4	DF	VEN	Christian Makoun (vice-captain)
7	FW	BRA	Reinaldo
8	MF	SRB	Marko Grujić
9	FW	COL	Juan Perea
10	MF	BUL	Asen Mitkov
11	FW	IRL	Armstrong Oko-Flex
12	FW	MLI	Mustapha Sangaré
17	FW	BRA	Everton Bala
18	MF	SLO	Gašper Trdin
19	MF	MAR	El Mehdi El Moubarik
20	DF	ESP	Álex Centelles

No.	Pos.	Nation	Player
21	DF	POR	Aldair Neves
22	MF	FRA	Mazire Soula
27	FW	ANG	David Kusso
28	FW	BUL	Stivan Stoyanchov
31	DF	MKD	Nikola Serafimov
35	MF	POR	Serginho
47	MF	ALG	Akram Bouras
50	DF	BUL	Kristian Dimitrov (captain)
55	DF	BUL	Petko Hristov (on loan from Spezia)
77	FW	BUL	Adrian Raychev (on loan from Pisa)
78	GK	BUL	Martin Lukov
92	GK	BUL	Svetoslav Vutsov
99	FW	BUL	Radoslav Kirilov

For recent transfers, see list of Bulgarian football transfers summer 2026.

=== Reserve team and Youth academy ===
Note: Flags indicate national team as defined under FIFA eligibility rules; some limited exceptions apply. Players may hold more than one non-FIFA nationality.

No.	Pos.	Nation	Player
32	MF	BUL	Ivo Motev
36	MF	BUL	Radostin Stoilov
37	DF	BUL	Stoyan Dobrev

No.	Pos.	Nation	Player
38	MF	BUL	Sasho Grancharov
39	DF	BUL	Anton Manov
45	DF	BUL	Hristo Argirov

=== Out on loan ===
Note: Flags indicate national team as defined under FIFA eligibility rules; some limited exceptions apply. Players may hold more than one non-FIFA nationality.

No.	Pos.	Nation	Player
—	DF	CRO	Stipe Vulikić (at Septemvri Sofia until 31 December 2026)

=== Foreign players ===
Up to twenty foreign nationals can be registered and given a squad number for the first team in the Bulgarian First League, however only five non-EU/EEA nationals can be used during a match day (up to three additional non-EU/EEA nationals may be used in exchange for a fee). Those non-EU/EEA nationals with European ancestry can claim citizenship from the nation their ancestors came from. If players are not of European origin, they can claim Bulgarian citizenship after five years of playing in Bulgaria.

EU/EEA Nationals

- (Portugal) Aldair Neves
- (Portugal) Serginho
- (Slovenia) Gašper Trdin
- (Spain) Álex Centelles

EU/EEA Nationals (Dual citizenship)

- (Angola) (Portugal) David Kusso
- (Brazil) (Portugal) Hevertton
- (France) (Algeria) Mazire Soula
- (Republic of Ireland) (England) Armstrong Oko-Flex
- (Mali) (France) Mustapha Sangaré
- (Venezuela) (Belgium) Christian Makoun

Non-EU/EEA Nationals

- (Algeria) Akram Bouras
- (Brazil) Everton Bala
- (Brazil) Maicon
- (Brazil) Reinaldo
- (Colombia) Juan Perea
- (Morocco) El Mehdi El Moubarik
- (North Macedonia) Nikola Serafimov
- (Serbia) Marko Grujić

Note: For a complete list of Levski Sofia players, see Category:PFC Levski Sofia players.

== Honours ==
Type	Competition	Achievement	Seasons
Domestic	First League	27 titles	1933, 1937, 1942, 1946, 1947, 1948–49, 1950, 1953, 1964–65, 1967–68, 1969–70, 1973–74, 1976–77, 1978–79, 1983–84, 1984–85, 1987–88, 1992–93, 1993–94, 1994–95, 1999–2000, 2000–01, 2001–02, 2005–06, 2006–07, 2008–09, 2025–26
Domestic	Bulgarian Cup	26 titles	1942, 1946, 1947, 1949, 1950, 1956, 1957, 1958–59, 1966–67, 1969–70, 1970–71, 1975–76, 1976–77, 1978–79, 1983–84, 1985–86, 1990–91, 1991–92, 1993–94, 1997–98, 1999–2000, 2001–02, 2002–03, 2004–05, 2006–07, 2021–22
Domestic	Bulgarian Supercup	3 titles	2005, 2007, 2009
Domestic	Sofia Championship	11 titles	1922–23, 1923–24, 1924–25, 1928–29, 1932–33, 1936–37, 1941–42, 1942–43, 1944–45, 1945–46, 1947–48
Domestic	Cup of Bulgaria	1 title^{S}	1981–82 (Note: Unofficial tournament)
Domestic	Cup of the Soviet Army	3 titles	1983–84, 1986–87, 1987–88
Domestic	Ulpia Serdika Cup (Note: Also known as Sofia Cup)	4 titles	1926, 1930, 1931, 1932
International	UEFA Europa League (Note: Known as UEFA Cup before 2009)	2 times Quarter-finals	1975–76, 2005–06
International	UEFA Cup Winners' Cup	3 times Quarter-finals	1969–70, 1976–77, 1986–87
International	Balkans Cup	2 times Runners-up	1960–61, 1961–63
Doubles	The Double	13 times	1942, 1946, 1947, 1948–49, 1950, 1969–70, 1976–77, 1978–79, 1983–84, 1993–94, 1999–2000, 2001–02, 2006–07
Trebles	The Treble	1 time^{S}	1983–84 (Note: A Group, Bulgarian Cup, and Cup of the Soviet Army)

- Record
- ^{S} Shared record

== European record ==
As of 5 November 2026

Levski Sofia record in European football by competition
Competition	S	P	W	D	L	GF	GA	GD
UEFA Champions League / European Cup	16	66	19	17	30	84	89	–5
UEFA Cup Winners' Cup / European Cup Winners' Cup	11	36	14	5	17	70	55	+15
UEFA Europa League / UEFA Cup	28	120	43	29	48	149	155	–6
UEFA Conference League / UEFA Europa Conference League	3	14	7	3	4	15	13	+2
UEFA Intertoto Cup	1	6	2	2	2	12	11	+1
Balkans Cup	3	23	8	8	7	35	24	+11
Mitropa Cup	1	2	1	0	1	1	5	–4
Total	63	267	94	64	109	366	352	+14

== Recent seasons ==
=== League positions ===
Season	Position	G	W	D	L	GS	GA	P	Bulgarian Cup	Bulgarian Supercup	Champions League	Europa League	Conference League
2015–16	2	32	16	8	8	36	18	56	Quarter-finals	—	—	—	—
2016–17	3	36	18	9	9	50	31	63	Round of 16	—	—	Second qualifying round	—
2017–18	3	36	18	10	8	55	27	64	Runners-up	—	—	Second qualifying round	—
2018–19	3	36	20	6	10	64	37	66	Round of 16	—	—	First qualifying round	—
2019–20	4	31	15	8	8	50	30	53	Semi-finals	—	—	Second qualifying round	—
2020–21	8	32	11	8	13	34	32	41	Quarter-finals	—	—	—	—
2021–22	4	31	15	7	9	38	27	52	Winners	—	—	—	—
2022–23	4	35	17	10	8	47	22	61	Round of 16	Runners-up	—	—	Third qualifying round
2023–24	4	35	19	7	9	50	30	64	Round of 16	—	—	—	Play-off round
2024–25	2	36	21	9	6	64	29	72	Quarter-finals	—	—	—	—
2025–26	1	36	25	6	5	71	25	81	Quarter-finals	Runners-up	—	Second qualifying round	Play-off round

Key

- G = Games played
- W = Games won
- D = Games drawn
- L = Games lost
- GS = Goals scored
- GA = Goals against
- P = Points

== Club officials ==
=== Management ===
Position	Staff
President	(Bulgaria) Nasko Sirakov
Board of directors	(Bulgaria) Daniel Borimirov
Board of directors	(Brazil) Edu
Board of directors	(Brazil) Claudio Pracownik
Board of directors	(Brazil) Felipe Berliner
Board of directors	(United Kingdom) Matthew Cherry

Last updated: September 2026

=== First team ===
Technical staff
Head coach	(Spain) Julio Velázquez
Assistant coaches	(Spain) Fernando Gaspar Laborie
Assistant coaches	(North Macedonia) Darko Tasevski
Goalkeeper coach	(Bulgaria) Bozhidar Mitrev
Fitness coaches	(Spain) José Antonio Morga
Fitness coaches	(Bulgaria) Denislav Drashkov
Fitness coaches	(Bulgaria) Nikolay Leskov
Analysts	(Bulgaria) Martin Gardev
Analysts	(Bulgaria) Nikolay Hristov
Physiotherapist	(Bulgaria) Petar Lozanov
Nutritionist	(Spain) Marina Orea
Psychologist	(Bulgaria) Todor Todorov
Doctor	(Bulgaria) Mitko Georgiev
Administrator	(Bulgaria) Rayko Yakimov
Chief scout	(Bulgaria) Krasimir Petrov
Scout	(Bulgaria) Georgi Korudzhiev
Housekeeper	(Bulgaria) Bozhidar Milushev

Last updated: July 2026

=== Academy ===
Director
(Spain) Emilio Larraz
Deputy director
(Bulgaria) Elin Topuzakov
Technical staff
Coordinator	(Bulgaria) Bozhidar Iskrenov
Methodologist	(Spain) Carlos Sánchez
B team coach	(Bulgaria) Yordan Petkov
Under-17 coach	(Bulgaria) Stoyan Dimov
Under-16 coach	(Bulgaria) Dimitar Andonov
Under-15 coach	(Bulgaria) Iliyan Ivanov
Under-14 coach	(Bulgaria) Simeon Ganchev
Assistant coaches	(Bulgaria) Angel Angelov
Assistant coaches	(Bulgaria) Hristiyan Hristov
Goalkeeper coaches	(Bulgaria) Vladimir Stoyanov
Goalkeeper coaches	(Bulgaria) Ivaylo Vasilev
Goalkeeper coaches	(Bulgaria) Kaloyan Drenkov
Fitness coach	(Bulgaria) Plamen Nyagin
Doctor	(Bulgaria) Pavel Grozev
Administrator	(Bulgaria) Iliyana Dimitrova
Scouts	(Bulgaria) Vladimir Gadzhev
Scouts	(Bulgaria) Georgi Sarmov
Housekeepers	(Bulgaria) Grigor Nedyalkov
Housekeepers	(Bulgaria) Kostantin Milanov

Last updated: June 2026

== Youth academy ==
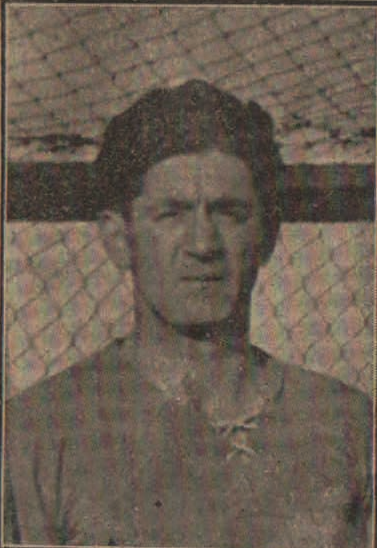
Asen Peshev, the first Bulgarian Footballer of the Year and two times Balkan Cup winner

Levski's youth academy has developed some of the most successful Bulgarian footballers. Notable academy graduates are Georgi Asparuhov, Nasko Sirakov, Bozhidar Iskrenov, Bozhin Laskov, Georgi Sokolov, Asen Peshev, Borislav Mihaylov, Emil Spasov, Nikolay Iliev, Hristo Yovov, Dimitar Ivankov, Marian Hristov, Hristo Iliev, Aleksandar Kostov, Tsvetan Veselinov, Zdravko Zdravkov, Voyn Voynov, Nikolay Mihaylov and many others. At the 1994 FIFA World Cup, in which Bulgaria reached the semi-finals, the Bulgarian team included four players who went through Levski's youth academy, making it the most represented club in the Bulgarian squad. In 2020, Levski was included in the CIES Football Observatory annual rankings, which ranks the clubs that trained the most players active in 31 top divisions of UEFA member associations. In these countries there were 33 footballers from Levski's youth academy, and Levski was ranked 35th in Europe.

== UEFA & IFFHS rankings ==
=== Club coefficients ===
This is the current 2025–26 UEFA coefficient:

Rank	Team	Coefficient
218	(Cyprus) Aris Limassol	7.138
219	(Cyprus) Apollon Limassol	7.138
220	(Cyprus) Anorthosis	7.138
221	(Cyprus) AEL Limassol	7.138
222	(Bulgaria) Levski Sofia	7.000
223	(Scotland) Hibernian	7.000
224	Ararat-Armenia	7.000
225	(Hungary) Puskás Akadémia	7.000
226	(Faroe Islands) HB	7.000

- Full list

=== Club world ranking ===
These are the IFFHS club's points as of 31 January 2026:

Rank	Team	Points
228	(Nicaragua) Diriangén	92
228	(Argentina) Independiente Rivadavia	92
228	(Netherlands) Twente	92
232	(Chile) Palestino	91,5
232	(Bulgaria) Levski Sofia	91,5
232	(Scotland) Heart of Midlothian	91,5
235	(Republic of Ireland) Shelbourne	91
235	(United Arab Emirates) Sharjah	91
237	(Kazakhstan) Kairat	90,75

- Full list

== Shirt sponsors and kit manufacturers ==
Period	Kit manufacturer	Shirt sponsor
1976–1991	Adidas	None
1991–1992	Diadora	Pepsi
1992–1994	Adidas	Balkanbank
1994–1996	Adidas	Balkanbank / Bulstrad
1996–1998	Adidas	VIS-2
1998–1999	Adidas	None
1999–2000	Reusch	Mtel
2000–2005	Diadora	Mtel
2005–2010	Uhlsport	Mtel
2010–2012	Nike	Mtel
2012–2014	Puma	VTB Capital / Mtel
2014–2015	Joma	Lev Ins / Mtel
2015–2018	Joma	Vivacom / Strabag / efbet
2018–2019	Nike	Vivacom / Strabag / efbet
2019–2020	Nike	7777.bg
2020–2022	Joma	Strabag / PalmsBet
2022–2023	Joma	PalmsBet
2023–2026	Adidas	PalmsBet
2026–	Adidas	8888.bg

== Club records ==
As of 2026

- Biggest league win: 10–0 vs Chernomorets Burgas Sofia (3 March 2007) — 2006–07
- Biggest league defeat: 1–6 vs Botev Plovdiv (7 July 1962) — 1961–62
- Biggest cup win: 12–1 vs Knyaz Kiril Sofia — 1940
- Biggest cup defeat: 0–5 vs Spartak Plovdiv — 1961–62
- Biggest European competition win: 12–2 vs (Finland) Reipas Lahti (16 September 1976) — European Cup Winners' Cup, first round first leg, 1976–77
- Biggest European competition defeat: 0–5 vs (Netherlands) AZ Alkmaar (4 November 1980) — UEFA Cup, second round second leg, 1980–81
  vs (Spain) Barcelona (12 September 2006) — UEFA Champions League, group stage, 2006–07
  vs (Portugal) Sporting CP (30 September 2010) — UEFA Europa League, group stage, 2010–11
- Biggest European competition win on aggregate: 19–3 vs (Finland) Reipas Lahti — European Cup Winners' Cup, first round, 1976–77
- Biggest European competition defeat on aggregate: 0–7 vs (Cyprus) AEK Larnaca — UEFA Europa League, second qualifying round, 2019–20
- Most consecutive league games unbeaten at home: 203 — from 1966 to 1985
- Most consecutive league games unbeaten: 27 — from 10 September 1948 to 13 May 1950
- Most consecutive league games won: 14 — from 3 April 2004 to 19 September 2004
- Most league points in a season:

3 for win: 81 (Note: Technically, in the 2001–02 season, Levski won 88 points from 36 games (27 wins, 7 draws, 2 defeats); however, as the season was divided into a regular season and play-off rounds, the regular season points were halved for the play-off round, thus officially, Levski finished the season with 56 points.) — 2025–26
2 for win: 50 — 1969–70, 1971–72

- Most league goals in a season: 96 (Note: 3 goals were counted in a walkover win.) — 2006–07
- Record league home attendance: 60,000 vs Pirin Blagoevgrad (16 September 1973) — 1973–74
- Record European competition home attendance: 55,000 vs (Spain) Barcelona (17 March 1976) — UEFA Cup, quarter-finals second leg, 1975–76
- Record incoming transfer: (Bulgaria) Georgi Chilikov from Naftex Burgas for €1,500,000
  (Brazil) Reinaldo from (Portugal) Santa Clara for €1,500,000
- Record outgoing transfer: (Bulgaria) Georgi Ivanov to (France) Rennes for €4,100,000

== Player records ==
As of 2026

=== Most appearances ===
No.	Name	Career	Appearances
1	(Bulgaria) Stefan Aladzhov	1967–1981	469
2	(Bulgaria) Emil Spasov	1974–1990	429
3	(Bulgaria) Pavel Panov	1969–1981	382
4	(Bulgaria) Kiril Ivkov	1967–1978	374
5	(Bulgaria) Elin Topuzakov	1996–2008; 2009–2010	347
6	(Bulgaria) Hristo Iliev	1954–1968	330
6	(Bulgaria) Aleksandar Kostov	1956–1971	330
8	(Bulgaria) Dimitar Telkiyski	1999–2008; 2009–2010	313
9	(Bulgaria) Plamen Nikolov	1977–1992	310
10	(Bulgaria) Hristo Yovov	1995–1997; 2004–2007; 2009–2013	306

=== Most goals scored ===
No.	Name	Career	Goals	Appearances	Goals per game
1	(Bulgaria) Nasko Sirakov	1981–1994	209	264	0.79
2	(Bulgaria) Pavel Panov	1969–1981	177	382	0.46
3	(Bulgaria) Georgi Asparuhov	1959–1971	153	239	0.64
4	(Bulgaria) Georgi Ivanov	1997–2009	135	238	0.57
5	(Bulgaria) Hristo Iliev	1954–1959; 1961–1968	132	330	0.4
6	(Bulgaria) Emil Spasov	1974–1985; 1987–1988; 1989–1990	114	429	0.27
7	(Bulgaria) Mihail Valchev	1981–1986	109	177	0.62
8	(Bulgaria) Dimitar Yordanov	1956–1965	100	201	0.5
9	(Bulgaria) Hristo Yovov	1995–1997; 2004–2007; 2009–2013	87	306	0.28
10	(Bulgaria) Asen Peshev	1924–1937	86	99	0.87
10	(Bulgaria) Daniel Borimirov	1990–1995; 2004–2008	86	297	0.29

== Managerial history ==
- (Bulgaria) Boris Vasilev (1921–23)
- (Soviet Union) Mihail Borisov (1923–24)
- (Bulgaria) Boris Vasilev (1924–27)
- (Bulgaria) Ivan Kachev (1927–32)
- (Bulgaria) Tsvetan Genev (1932–33)
- (Bulgaria) Ivan Radoev (1933)
- (Bulgaria) Georgi Karaivanov (1934)
- (Austria) Rudolf Löwenfeld (1934–35)
- (Bulgaria) Ivan Radoev (1936)
- (Bulgaria) Kiril Yovovich (1936–37)
- (Bulgaria) Ivan Radoev (1937–38)
- (Bulgaria) Dimitar Mutafchiev (1938–39)
- (Bulgaria) Asen Panchev (1939–40)
- (Czechoslovakia) Miloš Strużka (1940–41)
- (Bulgaria) Asen Panchev (1941–44)
- (Bulgaria) Ivan Radoev (1944–48)
- (Hungary) Rezső Somlai (1948–49)
- (Bulgaria) Ivan Radoev (1950–51)
- (Bulgaria) Liubomir Petrov (1952)
- (Bulgaria) Dimitar Mutafchiev (1953)
- (Bulgaria) Vasil Spasov (1954–56)
- (Bulgaria) Georgi Pachedzhiev (1956–60)
- (Bulgaria) Kotse Georgiev (1960–61)
- (Bulgaria) Krastio Chakarov (1961–64)
- (Bulgaria) Hristo Mladenov (1964–65)
- (Czech Republic) Rudolf Vytlačil (1965–66)
- (Bulgaria) Krastyo Chakarov (1966–69)
- (Bulgaria) Vasil Spasov (1969)
- (Czech Republic) Rudolf Vytlačil (1969–70)
- (Bulgaria) Yoncho Arsov (1971–73)
- (Bulgaria) Dimitar Doychinov (1973–75)
- (Bulgaria) Ivan Vutsov (1975–76)
- (Bulgaria) Vasil Spasov (1976–77)
- (Bulgaria) Ivan Vutsov (1977–80)
- (Bulgaria) Hristo Mladenov (1980–82)
- (Bulgaria) Dobromir Zhechev (1982–83)
- (Bulgaria) Vasil Metodiev (1983–85)
- (Bulgaria) Kiril Ivkov (1985–86)
- (Bulgaria) Pavel Panov (1986–87)
- (Bulgaria) Vasil Metodiev (1988–89)
- (Bulgaria) Dobromir Zhechev (1989)
- (Bulgaria) Pavel Panov (1989–90)
- (Bulgaria) Vasil Metodiev (1991)
- (Bulgaria) Dinko Dermendzhiev (1991)
- (Bulgaria) Ivan Vutov (1992–93)
- (Bulgaria) Georgi Vasilev (1993–95)
- (Bulgaria) Ivan Kyuchukov (1995–96)
- (Bulgaria) Georgi Tsvetkov (1996–97)
- (Bulgaria) Stefan Grozdanov (1997)
- (Bulgaria) Mihail Valchev (1998)
- (Ukraine) Vyacheslav Hrozny (1998)
- (Bulgaria) Angel Stankov (1999)
- (Serbia) Ljupko Petrović (1999–00)
- (Bulgaria) Dimitar Dimitrov (2000)
- (Russia) Vladimir Fedotov (2000)
- (Serbia) Ljupko Petrović (2000–01)
- (Bulgaria) Georgi Todorov (2001)
- (Germany) Rüdiger Abramczik (2002)
- (Serbia) Slavoljub Muslin (2002–03)
- (Bulgaria) Georgi Todorov (2003)
- (Bulgaria) Georgi Vasilev (2003–04)
- (Bulgaria) Stanimir Stoilov (1 June 2004 – 6 May 2008)
- (Bulgaria) Velislav Vutsov (2008)
- (Bulgaria) Emil Velev (16 August 2008 – 23 July 2009)
- (Serbia) Ratko Dostanić (23 July 2009 – 19 October 2009)
- (Bulgaria) Georgi Ivanov (19 October 2009 – 30 June 2010)
- (Bulgaria) Antoni Zdravkov (2009–10)
- (Bulgaria) Yasen Petrov (1 July 2010 – 28 May 2011)
- (Bulgaria) Georgi Ivanov (1 June 2011 – 3 November 2011)
- (Bulgaria) Antoni Zdravkov (2011)
- (Bulgaria) Nikolay Kostov (3 November 2011 – 27 March 2012)
- (Bulgaria) Georgi Ivanov (interim) (27 March 2012 – 8 April 2012)
- (Bulgaria) Yasen Petrov (7 April 2012 – 30 May 2012)
- (Bulgaria) Ilian Iliev (1 July 2012 – April 2013)
- (Bulgaria) Nikolay Mitov (12 April 2013 – 12 July 2013)
- (Serbia) Slaviša Jokanović (15 July 2013 – October 2013)
- (Bulgaria) Ivaylo Petev (8 October 2013 – 9 October 2013)
- (Bulgaria) Antoni Zdravkov (10 October 2013 – 19 March 2014)
- (Bulgaria) Elin Topuzakov (20 March 2014 – June 2014)
- (Spain) José Murcia (June 2014 – 4 August 2014)
- (Bulgaria) Georgi Ivanov (4 August 2014 – 22 December 2014)
- (Bulgaria) Stoycho Stoev (22 December 2014 – 15 May 2016)
- (Serbia) Ljupko Petrović (16 May 2016 – 22 October 2016)
- (Bulgaria) Elin Topuzakov (22 October 2016 – 2 March 2017)
- (Bulgaria) Nikolay Mitov (2 March 2017 – 4 August 2017)
- (Italy) Delio Rossi (4 August 2017 – 25 July 2018)
- (Bulgaria) Todor Simov (interim) (25 July 2018 – 31 July 2018)
- (Slovenia) Slaviša Stojanović (31 July 2018 – 21 January 2019)
- (Bulgaria) Georgi Dermendzhiev (21 January 2019 – 29 April 2019)
- (Bulgaria) Georgi Todorov (interim) (29 April 2019 – 30 May 2019)
- (Bulgaria) Petar Hubchev (30 May 2019 – 11 June 2020)
- (Bulgaria) Georgi Todorov (11 June 2020 – 24 October 2020)
- (Bulgaria) Zhivko Milanov (interim) (24 October 2020 – 9 November 2020)
- (Slovenia) Slaviša Stojanović (10 November 2020 – 23 May 2021)
- (Bulgaria) Zhivko Milanov (2021)
- (Bulgaria) Todor Simov (interim) (2021)
- (Bulgaria) Stanimir Stoilov (2 September 2021 – 8 April 2023)
- (Bulgaria) Elin Topuzakov (interim) (10 April 2023 – 13 June 2023)
- (Bulgaria) Nikolay Kostov (13 June 2023 – 28 May 2024)
- (Bulgaria) Stanislav Genchev (28 May 2024 – 16 December 2024)
- (Spain) Julio Velázquez (5 January 2025 – present)

== Notable players ==
=== Bulgarian players ===
Players with at least one appearance for the Bulgaria national team.

- Kiril Yovovich
- Konstantin Maznikov
- Geno Mateev
- Tsvetan Genev
- Dimitar Mutafchiev
- Nikola Mutafchiev
- Ivan Radoev
- Aleksandar Hristov
- Petar Ivanov
- Mihail Lozanov
- Asen Panchev
- Asen Peshev
- Bozhin Laskov
- Amedeo Kleva
- Vasil Spasov
- Georgi Pachedzhiev
- Yordan Tomov
- Lyubomir Hranov
- Apostol Sokolov
- Stefan Abadzhiev
- Yoncho Arsov
- Hristo Iliev
- Boris Apostolov
- Dimitar Yordanov
- Aleksandar Kostov
- Georgi Sokolov
- Stefan Aladzhov
- Georgi Asparuhov
- Tsvetan Veselinov
- Ivan Vutsov
- Georgi Kamenski
- Yanko Kirilov
- Nikola Kotkov
- Biser Mihaylov
- Mihail Gyonin
- Todor Barzov
- Krasimir Borisov
- Voyn Voynov
- Milko Gaydarski
- Georgi Tsvetkov
- Dobromir Zhechev
- Kiril Ivkov
- Kiril Milanov
- Vasil Mitkov
- Pavel Panov
- Emil Spasov
- Stefan Staykov
- Ivan Stoyanov
- Emil Velev
- Mihail Valchev
- Rusi Gochev
- Nikolay Iliev
- Bozhidar Iskrenov
- Krasimir Koev
- Petar Kurdov
- Borislav Mihaylov
- Plamen Nikolov
- Petar Petrov
- Nasko Sirakov
- Georgi Slavchev
- Georgi Yordanov
- Plamen Getov
- Georgi Donkov
- Velko Yotov
- Aleksandar Aleksandrov
- Daniel Borimirov
- Ilian Iliev
- Emil Kremenliev
- Zdravko Zdravkov
- Plamen Nikolov
- Petar Mihtarski
- Petar Aleksandrov
- Tsanko Tsvetanov
- Zlatko Yankov
- Petar Hubchev
- Georgi Ivanov
- Nikolay Todorov
- Marian Hristov
- Stanimir Stoilov
- Predrag Pažin
- Elin Topuzakov
- Dimitar Telkiyski
- Hristo Yovov
- Lúcio Wagner
- Igor Tomašić
- Georgi Ivanov
- Emil Angelov
- Stanislav Angelov
- Nikolay Dimitrov
- Vladimir Gadzhev
- Valeri Domovchiyski
- Dimitar Ivankov
- Milan Koprivarov
- Zhivko Milanov
- Nikolay Mihaylov
- Mariyan Ognyanov
- Georgi Petkov
- Ilian Stoyanov
- Georgi Markov
- Ivan Tsvetkov
- Georgi Chilikov
- Zahari Sirakov
- Plamen Iliev
- Veselin Minev
- Stanislav Kostov
- Valeri Bojinov
- Aleksandar Kolev
- Iliyan Stefanov

=== Foreign players ===
Foreign players with at least 30 games for the club or that were internationally capped. Players who were internationally capped for their country are listed in bold.

**Europe**

- (Bosnia and Herzegovina) Dalibor Dragić
- (Czech Republic) David Jablonský
- (France) Cédric Bardon
- (France) Hassimi Fadiga
- (France) Gabriel Obertan
- (France) Jeremy Petris
- (Hungary) **Péter Kabát**
- (Iceland) **Hólmar Örn Eyjólfsson**
- (Montenegro) **Milan Mijatović**
- (Netherlands) Serginho Greene
- (Netherlands) Kellian van der Kaap
- (Netherlands) Nigel Robertha
- (North Macedonia) **Darko Tasevski**
- (North Macedonia) **Gjoko Zajkov**
- (Portugal) Cristóvão Ramos
- (Portugal) João Silva
- (Portugal) Nuno Reis
- (Romania) Sergiu Buș
- (Russia) Konstantin Golovskoy
- (Scotland) John Inglis
- (Serbia) Miloš Cvetković
- (Serbia) **Bojan Jorgačević**
- (Serbia and Montenegro) **Miodrag Pantelić**
- (Serbia and Montenegro) **Saša Simonović**
- (Slovakia) **Roman Procházka**
- (Slovenia) **Rene Mihelič**
- (Spain) Añete
- (Spain) Miguel Bedoya
- (Spain) Jordi Gómez
- (Spain) Jawad El Jemili
- (Sweden) **Simon Sandberg**
- (Switzerland) Davide Mariani

**North and Central America**

- (Curaçao) **Dustley Mulder**
- (Panama) **José Córdoba**

**South America**

- (Brazil) Zé Soares
- (Brazil) Joãozinho
- (Brazil) Paulinho
- (Brazil) Ronaldo
- (Brazil) Welton Felipe
- (Peru) **Jean Deza**

**Africa**

- (Benin) **Cédric Hountondji**
- (Cape Verde) **Garry Rodrigues**
- (The Gambia) **Noah Sonko Sundberg**
- (Ghana) Francis Narh
- (Guinea-Bissau) **Basile de Carvalho**
- (Ivory Coast) **Serge Yoffou**
- (Mali) **Garra Dembélé**
- (Morocco) **Chakib Benzoukane**
- (Morocco) **Mehdi Bourabia**
- (Morocco) **Youssef Rabeh**
- (Nigeria) **Garba Lawal**
- (Nigeria) Omonigho Temile
- (Nigeria) **Justice Christopher**
- (Nigeria) **Richard Eromoigbe**
- (Nigeria) Ekundayo Jayeoba
- (Nigeria) **Tunde Adeniji**
- (Senegal) Khaly Thiam
- (South Africa) **Ricardo Nunes**

=== Bulgarian Footballer of the Year ===
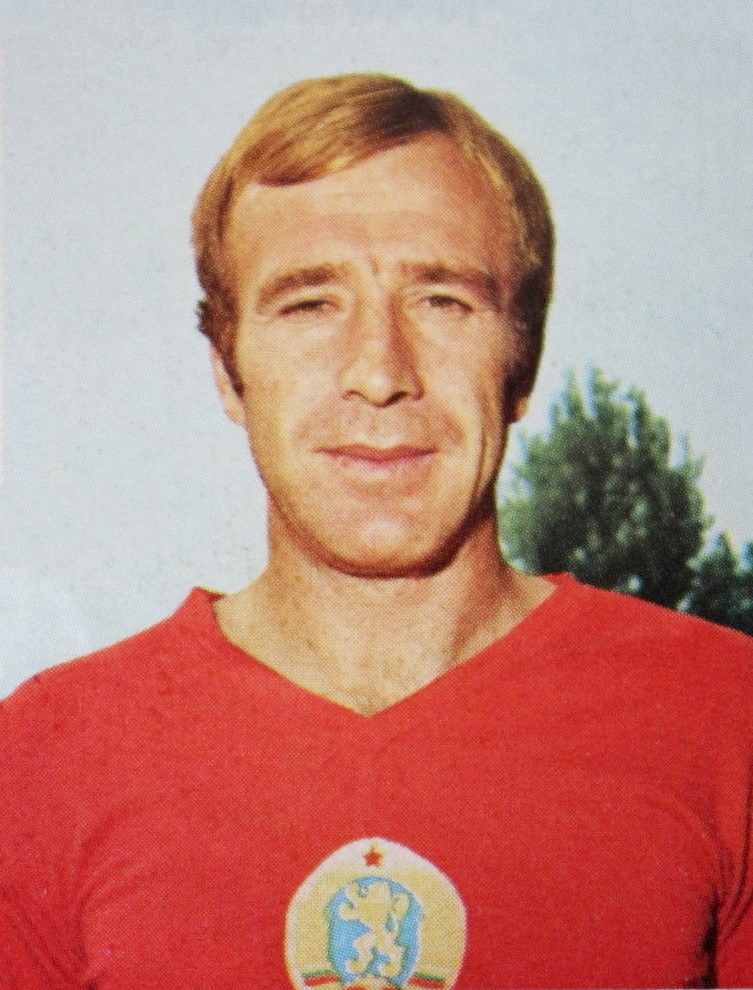
Kiril Ivkov, the 1968 Summer Olympics football tournament finalist

- 1931 – (Bulgaria) Asen Peshev
- 1942 – (Bulgaria) Lyuben Stamboliev
- 1948 – (Bulgaria) Vasil Spasov
- 1965 – (Bulgaria) Georgi Asparuhov
- 1970 – (Bulgaria) Stefan Aladzhov
- 1974 – (Bulgaria) Kiril Ivkov
- 1975 – (Bulgaria) Kiril Ivkov
- 1977 – (Bulgaria) Pavel Panov
- 1984 – (Bulgaria) Plamen Nikolov
- 1986 – (Bulgaria) Borislav Mihaylov
- 1987 – (Bulgaria) Nikolay Iliev
- 1999 – (Bulgaria) Aleksandar Aleksandrov
- 2000 – (Bulgaria) Georgi Ivanov
- 2001 – (Bulgaria) Georgi Ivanov

=== First division top goalscorers ===
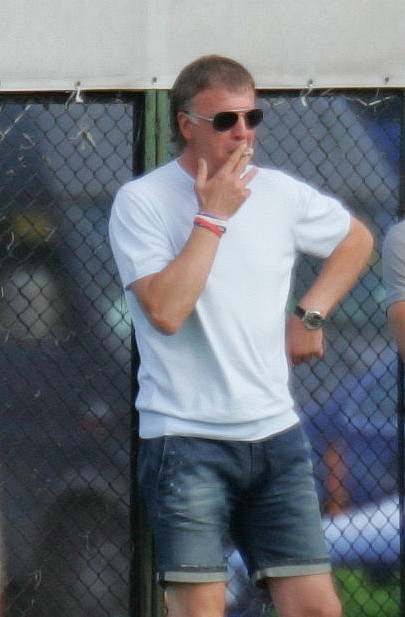
Nasko Sirakov, Levski's all-time top goalscorer

- 1940 – (Bulgaria) Yanko Stoyanov (14 goals)
- 1950 – (Bulgaria) Lubomir Hranov (11 goals)
- 1957 – (Bulgaria) Hristo Iliev (14 goals)
- 1960 – (Bulgaria) Dimitar Yordanov (12 goals)
- 1965 – (Bulgaria) Georgi Asparuhov (27 goals)
- 1974 – (Bulgaria) Kiril Milanov (19 goals)
- 1976 – (Bulgaria) Pavel Panov (18 goals)
- 1977 – (Bulgaria) Pavel Panov (20 goals)
- 1979 – (Bulgaria) Rusi Gochev (19 goals)
- 1982 – (Bulgaria) Mihail Valchev (24 goals)
- 1984 – (Bulgaria) Emil Spasov (19 goals)
- 1987 – (Bulgaria) Nasko Sirakov (36 goals)
- 1988 – (Bulgaria) Nasko Sirakov (28 goals)
- 1992 – (Bulgaria) Nasko Sirakov (26 goals)
- 1993 – (Bulgaria) Plamen Getov (26 goals)
- 1994 – (Bulgaria) Nasko Sirakov (30 goals)
- 2001 – (Bulgaria) Georgi Ivanov (21 goals)
- 2003 – (Bulgaria) Georgi Chilikov (22 goals)
- 2011 – (Mali) Garra Dembélé (26 goals)
- 2013 – (Guinea-Bissau) Basile de Carvalho (19 goals)
- 2015 – (Spain) Añete (14 goals)
- 2019 – (Bulgaria) Stanislav Kostov (24 goals)
- 2026 – (Brazil) Everton Bala (18 goals) (Note: Shared with Mamadou Diallo (CSKA 1948).)
