= Geno Mateev =

Bulgarian footballer

Personal information
- Date of birth: 3 January 1903
- Place of birth: Sofia, Bulgaria
- Date of death: 6 June 1966 (aged 63)
- Place of death: Sofia, Bulgaria

International career
Years	Team	Apps	(Gls)
- Bulgaria

Geno Mateev (Bulgarian: Гено Матеев; 3 January 1903 – 6 June 1966) was a Bulgarian footballer. He competed in the men's tournament at the 1924 Summer Olympics.

== Honours ==
Levski Sofia

- Sofia Championship – 1923, 1924, 1925
- Ulpia Serdika Cup – 1926

International

- Football at the 1924 Summer Olympics – 12th place with Bulgaria
