= Jack Hunter (Australian footballer) =

Australian rules footballer, born 1914

Personal information
- Full name: Jack Hunter
- Born: 5 October 1914
- Died: 21 September 1990 (aged 75)
- Original team: South Bendigo
- Height: 192 cm (6 ft 4 in)
- Weight: 95 kg (209 lb)
- Position: Full Forward

Playing career^{1}
Years	Club	Games (Goals)
1940	Essendon	2 (7)
1944–45	North Melbourne	7 (13)
Total		9 (20)
- ^{1} Playing statistics correct to the end of 1945.

Jack Hunter (5 October 1914 – 21 September 1990) was an Australian rules footballer who played with Essendon and North Melbourne in the Victorian Football League (VFL).
