= Petar Ivanov (footballer) =

Bulgarian footballer

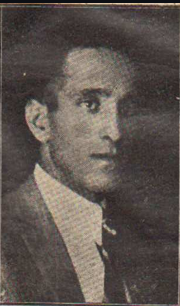

Personal information
- Date of birth: 29 June 1903
- Place of birth: Yambol, Bulgaria
- Date of death: 18 January 1968 (aged 64)

International career
Years	Team	Apps	(Gls)
- Bulgaria

Petar Ivanov (29 June 1903 – 18 January 1968) was a Bulgarian footballer. He competed in the men's tournament at the 1924 Summer Olympics and played for Levski Sofia.

== Honours ==
Levski Sofia

- Bulgarian A PFG: 1933
- Sofia Championship: 1923, 1924, 1925, 1933
- Ulpia Serdika Cup: 1926, 1930
