= Simeon Yankov =

Bulgarian footballer (1899–1979)

Personal information
- Date of birth: 17 February 1899
- Place of birth: Sofia, Bulgaria
- Date of death: 3 September 1979 (aged 80)
- Place of death: Sofia, Bulgaria

International career
Years	Team	Apps	(Gls)
- Bulgaria

Simeon Yankov (Bulgarian: Симеон Янков, 17 February 1899 – 3 September 1979) was a Bulgarian footballer. He competed in the men's tournament at the 1924 Summer Olympics.
