= Dimitar Mutafchiev =

Bulgarian footballer

Personal information
- Date of birth: 10 January 1903
- Place of birth: Stara Zagora, Bulgaria
- Date of death: 8 September 1990 (aged 87)
- Position: Forward

Senior career*
Years	Team	Apps	(Gls)
1921–1930	Levski Sofia	60	(48)

International career
1924–1925	Bulgaria	3	(0)

Managerial career
- 1938–1939: Levski Sofia
- 1940: Lokomotiv Sofia
- 1953: Levski Sofia
- * Club domestic league appearances and goals

Dimitar Mutafchiev (Bulgarian: Димитър Мутафчиев) (10 January 1903 – 8 September 1990) was a Bulgarian footballer. He was born in Stara Zagora, and played as a forward for Levski Sofia and Bulgaria during the 1920s.

== Career ==
For nine seasons from 1921 to 1930, Mutafchiev scored 48 goals in 60 games for Levski Sofia.

He played for the national team in the Bulgaria's first international match against Austria in Vienna on 21 May 1924. Mutafchiev also participated at the 1924 Summer Olympics.

== Career statistics ==
Club	Season	League	
Club	Season	Apps	Goals
Levski Sofia	1921–22	10	5
Levski Sofia	1922–23	8	10
Levski Sofia	1923–24	13	12
Levski Sofia	1924–25	12	12
Levski Sofia	1925–26	9	6
Levski Sofia	1926–27	5	2
Levski Sofia	1927–28	1	0
Levski Sofia	1928–29	0	0
Levski Sofia	1929–30	2	1
Career totals		60	48

== Honours ==
Player

Levski Sofia

- Bulgarian State Football Championship
  - Runners-up (2): 1925, 1929
- Sofia Championship
  - Champion (4): 1923, 1924, 1925, 1929
- Ulpia Serdika Cup
  - Winner (2): 1926, 1930

Coach

Levski Sofia

- Bulgarian league
  - Champion (1): 1953
