= Tom Crouch (footballer) =

Australian rules footballer

Personal information
- Full name: Tom Crouch
- Born: 23 February 1916
- Died: 27 September 1990 (aged 74)
- Original team: Footscray Tech Old Boys
- Height: 180 cm (5 ft 11 in)
- Weight: 69 kg (152 lb)

Playing career^{1}
Years	Club	Games (Goals)
1936	Footscray	4 (2)
- ^{1} Playing statistics correct to the end of 1936.

Tom Crouch (23 February 1916 – 27 September 1990) was a former Australian rules footballer who played with Footscray in the Victorian Football League (VFL).
