= 1933 Bulgarian State Football Championship =

Football league season

Bulgarian State Football Championship
- Season: 1933
- Champions: Levski Sofia

The 1933 Bulgarian State Football Championship was the tenth edition of the Bulgarian State Football Championship, the national football competition in Bulgaria.

== Overview ==
It was contested by 13 teams, and Levski Sofia won the championship.

== First round ==
Team 1	Score	Team 2
Borislav Kyustendil	3–2	Petar Parchevich Plovdiv
Botev Yambol	1–0 (a.e.t.)	Chernomorets Burgas
Napredak Ruse	3–0	Maria Luisa Lom
Shipchenski sokol Varna	3–0	Chardafon Gabrovo
Borislav Stara Zagora	1–0 (a.e.t.)	Levski Svilengrad
Levski Pleven	6–0	Botev Vratsa
Levski Sofia	bye	

== Quarter-finals ==
Team 1	Score	Team 2
Levski Sofia	9–1	Borislav Kyustendil
Levski Pleven	1–2	Napredak Ruse
Botev Yambol	5–1	Borislav Stara Zagora
Shipchenski sokol Varna	bye	

== Semi-finals ==
Team 1	Score	Team 2
Napredak Ruse	1–4	Shipchenski sokol Varna
Levski Sofia	4–2	Botev Yambol

== Final ==
3 October 1933

Levski Sofia	3–1	Shipchenski sokol Varna
Zhekov 12'; Panchev 29'; Peshev 63'		Bulashev 36'

AS-23 Stadium, Sofia
Attendance: 12,000
