= Cup of the Soviet Army (1983–1990) =

Soviet Army Cup
- Most recent season or competition: 1989–90
- Sport: Football
- Founded: 1945
- First season: 1946
- Folded: 1990
- No. of teams: Various
- Country: Bulgaria
- Last champion: CSKA Sofia (4th title)
- Most titles: CSKA Sofia (4 titles)
- Promotion to: UEFA Cup Winners' Cup (1962–1982)
- Related competitions: Bulgarian Cup

The Soviet Army Cup (Bulgarian: Купа на Съветската армия, romanized: Kupa na Savetskata armiya) was an annual knockout football cup tournament held in Bulgaria between 1946 and 1990. Until 1982, it was the country's main cup competition, its winners would qualify for the UEFA Cup Winners' Cup. From 1982, to its ceasure in 1990 the Soviet Army Cup served as a secondary cup tournament.

== Winners ==
=== As a secondary cup competition (1983–1990) ===
Season	Winner	Result	Runner-up	Date	Venue	Attendance
1982–83	Lokomotiv Plovdiv (II)	3–1	FC Chirpan (II)	1 June 1983	Vasil Levski National Stadium, Sofia	25,000
1983–84	Levski Sofia	4–0	Dorostol Silistra (II)	9 May 1984	Vasil Levski National Stadium, Sofia	25,000
1984–85	CSKA Sofia	4–0	Cherno More Varna	9 May 1985	Vasil Levski National Stadium, Sofia	15,000
1985–86	CSKA Sofia	2–0	Lokomotiv Sofia	21 May 1986	Vasil Levski National Stadium, Sofia	12,000
1986–87	Levski Sofia	3–2	Spartak Pleven	9 May 1987	Vasil Levski National Stadium, Sofia	15,000
1987–88	Levski Sofia	2–0	Cherno More Varna (II)	1 June 1988	Vasil Levski National Stadium, Sofia	20,000
1988–89	CSKA Sofia	6–1	Minyor Radnevo (III)	7 June 1989	Vasil Levski National Stadium, Sofia	6,000
1989–90	CSKA Sofia	2–1	Botev Plovdiv	1 June 1990	Ovcha Kupel Stadium, Sofia	5,000

Notes:

- (II) - Clubs representing Bulgarian B Professional Football Group at the moment of the final.
- (III) - Clubs representing Bulgarian V AFG at the moment of the final.

== Performances ==
=== Performance by club ===
Club	Winners	Runners-up	Winning Years
CSKA Sofia	4	–	1985, 1986, 1989, 1990
Levski Sofia	3	–	1984, 1987, 1988
Lokomotiv Plovdiv	1	–	1983
Cherno More Varna	–	2	
Botev Plovdiv	–	1	
FC Chirpan	–	1	
Dorostol Silistra	–	1	
Lokomotiv Sofia	–	1	
Minyor Radnevo	–	1	
Spartak Pleven	–	1	

=== Performance by city ===
City	Cups	Winning Clubs
Sofia	7	CSKA Sofia (4), Levski Sofia (3)
Plovdiv	1	Lokomotiv Plovdiv (1)
