= 1970 FIFA World Cup Group 4 =

Football tournament group stage

Group 4 of the 1970 FIFA World Cup was contested in León's Estadio Nou Camp between 2 and 11 June 1970. West Germany won the group, and advanced to the quarter-finals, along with Peru. Bulgaria and Morocco failed to advance.

== Standings ==
Pos	Team	Pld	W	D	L	GF	GA	GD	Pts	Qualification
1	West Germany	3	3	0	0	10	4	+6	6	Advance to knockout stage
2	Peru	3	2	0	1	7	5	+2	4	Advance to knockout stage
3	Bulgaria	3	0	1	2	5	9	−4	1	
3	Morocco	3	0	1	2	2	6	−4	1	

Source: FIFA

== Matches ==
All times local (UTC−6)

=== Peru vs Bulgaria ===
2 June 1970
16:00

Peru	3–2	Bulgaria
Gallardo 50'; Chumpitaz 55'; Cubillas 73'		Dermendzhiev 13'; Bonev 49'

Estadio Nou Camp, León
Attendance: 13,765
Referee: Antonio Sbardella (Italy)

Peru	Bulgaria

GK	1	Luis Rubiños
RB	2	Eloy Campos	(substituted off) 29'
CB	3	Orlando de la Torre
CB	4	Héctor Chumpitaz (c)
LB	5	Nicolás Fuentes
CM	6	Ramón Mifflin
CM	7	Roberto Challe
RW	8	Julio Baylón	(substituted off) 50'
LW	11	Alberto Gallardo
SS	10	Teófilo Cubillas
CF	9	Pedro Pablo León
Substitutions:
MF	15	Javier González	(substituted on) 29'
FW	20	Hugo Sotil	(substituted on) 50'
Manager:
(Brazil) Didi

GK	1	Simeon Simeonov
DF	2	Aleksandar Shalamanov
DF	3	Ivan Dimitrov (c)
DF	5	Ivan Davidov
DF	4	Stefan Aladzhov
MF	8	Hristo Bonev	(substituted off) 73'
MF	6	Dimitar Penev
MF	10	Dimitar Yakimov
FW	7	Georgi Popov	(substituted off) 59'
FW	9	Petar Zhekov
FW	11	Dinko Dermendzhiev
Substitutions:
FW	18	Dimitar Marashliev	(substituted on) 59'
FW	19	Georgi Asparuhov	(substituted on) 73'
Manager:
Stefan Bozhkov

Assistant referees:
Abel Aguilar Elizalde (Mexico)
Yoshiyuki Maruyama (Japan)

=== West Germany vs Morocco ===
3 June 1970
16:00

West Germany	2–1	Morocco
Seeler 56'; Müller 80'		Jarir 21'

Estadio Nou Camp, León
Attendance: 12,942
Referee: Laurens van Ravens (Netherlands)

West Germany	Morocco

GK	1	Sepp Maier
SW	5	Willi Schulz
RB	7	Berti Vogts
CB	11	Klaus Fichtel
LB	2	Horst-Dieter Höttges	(substituted off) 77'
RM	8	Helmut Haller	(substituted off) 46'
CM	4	Franz Beckenbauer
LM	12	Wolfgang Overath
RF	9	Uwe Seeler (c)
CF	13	Gerd Müller
LF	10	Sigfried Held
Substitutions:
FW	17	Hannes Löhr	(substituted on) 77'
FW	20	Jürgen Grabowski	(substituted on) 46'
Manager:
Helmut Schön

GK	1	Allal Ben Kassou
DF	2	Abdallah Lamrani
DF	4	Moulay Khanousi
DF	5	Kacem Slimani
DF	3	Boujemaa Benkhrif
MF	6	Mohammed Mahroufi
MF	8	Driss Bamous (c)	(substituted off) 72'
MF	10	Mohammed El Filali
MF	7	Said Ghandi
FW	11	Maouhoub Ghazouani	(substituted off) 56'
FW	14	Houmane Jarir
Substitutions:
FW	9	Ahmed Faras	(substituted on) 72'
DF	18	Abdelkader El Khiati	(substituted on) 56'
Manager:
(Socialist Federal Republic of Yugoslavia) Blagoje Vidinić

Assistant referees:
José María Ortiz de Mendíbil (Spain)
Guillermo Velasquez (Colombia)

=== Peru vs Morocco ===
6 June 1970
16:00

Peru	3–0	Morocco
Cubillas 65', 75'; Challe 67'

Estadio Nou Camp, León
Attendance: 13,537
Referee: Tofiq Bahramov (Soviet Union)

Peru	Morocco

GK	1	Luis Rubiños
RB	13	Pedro González
CB	3	Orlando de la Torre
CB	4	Héctor Chumpitaz (c)
LB	5	Nicolás Fuentes
CM	6	Ramón Mifflin	(substituted off) 56'
CM	7	Roberto Challe
RW	20	Hugo Sotil
LW	11	Alberto Gallardo	(substituted off) 76'
SS	10	Teófilo Cubillas
CF	9	Pedro Pablo León
Substitutions:
MF	17	Luis Cruzado	(substituted on) 56'
FW	22	Oswaldo Ramírez	(substituted on) 76'
Manager:
(Brazil) Didi

GK	1	Allal Ben Kassou
DF	2	Abdallah Lamrani
DF	4	Moulay Khanousi
DF	5	Kacem Slimani
DF	3	Boujemaa Benkhrif	(substituted off) 66'
MF	6	Mohammed Mahroufi
MF	8	Driss Bamous (c)
MF	10	Mohammed El Filali
MF	7	Said Ghandi	(substituted off) 81'
FW	11	Maouhoub Ghazouani
FW	14	Houmane Jarir
Substitutions:
DF	13	Jalili Fadili	(substituted on) 66'
FW	17	Ahmed Alaoui	(substituted on) 81'
Manager:
(Socialist Federal Republic of Yugoslavia) Blagoje Vidinić

Assistant referees:
Yoshiyuki Maruyama (Japan)
Antonio Sbardella (Italy)

=== West Germany vs Bulgaria ===
7 June 1970
12:00

West Germany	5–2	Bulgaria
Libuda 20'; Müller 27', 52' (pen.), 88'; Seeler 70'		Nikodimov 12'; Kolev 89'

Estadio Nou Camp, León
Attendance: 12,710
Referee: José María Ortiz de Mendíbil (Spain)

West Germany	Bulgaria

GK	1	Sepp Maier
DF	7	Berti Vogts
DF	3	Karl-Heinz Schnellinger
DF	11	Klaus Fichtel
DF	2	Horst-Dieter Höttges
MF	4	Franz Beckenbauer	(substituted off) 72'
MF	12	Wolfgang Overath
RW	14	Reinhard Libuda
FW	9	Uwe Seeler (c)
FW	13	Gerd Müller
LW	17	Hannes Löhr	(substituted off) 58'
Substitutions:
MF	6	Wolfgang Weber	(substituted on) 72'
FW	20	Jürgen Grabowski	(substituted on) 58'
Manager:
Helmut Schön

GK	1	Simeon Simeonov
DF	12	Milko Gaydarski
DF	14	Dobromir Zhechev
DF	17	Todor Kolev
DF	6	Dimitar Penev
MF	15	Boris Gaganelov (c)	(substituted off) 58'
MF	16	Asparuh Nikodimov
MF	11	Dinko Dermendzhiev	(substituted off) 46'
MF	19	Georgi Asparuhov
FW	18	Dimitar Marashliev
FW	8	Hristo Bonev
Substitutions:
DF	2	Aleksandar Shalamanov	(substituted on) 58'
MF	20	Vasil Mitkov	(substituted on) 46'
Manager:
Stefan Bozhkov

Assistant referees:
Guillermo Velasquez (Colombia)
Antonio Saldanha Ribeiro (Portugal)

=== West Germany vs Peru ===
10 June 1970
16:00

West Germany	3–1	Peru
Müller 19', 26', 39'		Cubillas 44'

Estadio Nou Camp, León
Attendance: 17,875
Referee: Abel Aguilar Elizalde (Mexico)

West Germany	Peru

GK	1	Sepp Maier
DF	7	Berti Vogts
DF	3	Karl-Heinz Schnellinger
DF	11	Klaus Fichtel
DF	2	Horst-Dieter Höttges	(substituted off) 46'
MF	4	Franz Beckenbauer
MF	12	Wolfgang Overath
RW	14	Reinhard Libuda	(substituted off) 75'
FW	9	Uwe Seeler (c)
FW	13	Gerd Müller
LW	17	Hannes Löhr
Substitutions:
DF	15	Bernd Patzke	(substituted on) 46'
FW	20	Jürgen Grabowski	(substituted on) 75'
Manager:
Helmut Schön

GK	1	Luis Rubiños
RB	13	Pedro González
CB	3	Orlando de la Torre
CB	4	Héctor Chumpitaz (c)
LB	5	Nicolás Fuentes
CM	6	Ramón Mifflin
CM	7	Roberto Challe	(substituted off) 72'
RW	20	Hugo Sotil
LW	11	Alberto Gallardo
SS	10	Teófilo Cubillas
CF	9	Pedro Pablo León	(substituted off) 56'
Substitutions:
MF	17	Luis Cruzado	(substituted on) 72'
FW	22	Oswaldo Ramírez	(substituted on) 56'
Manager:
(Brazil) Didi

Assistant referees:
José María Ortiz de Mendíbil (Spain)
Antonio Sbardella (Italy)

=== Bulgaria vs Morocco ===
11 June 1970
16:00

Bulgaria	1–1	Morocco
Zhechev 40'		Ghazouani 61'

Estadio Nou Camp, León
Attendance: 12,299
Referee: Antonio Ribeiro Saldanha (Portugal)

Bulgaria	Morocco

GK	13	Stoyan Yordanov
DF	12	Milko Gaydarski
DF	14	Dobromir Zhechev
DF	10	Dimitar Yakimov	(substituted off) 50'
DF	6	Dimitar Penev	(substituted off) 42'
MF	2	Aleksandar Shalamanov (c)
MF	16	Asparuh Nikodimov
MF	17	Todor Kolev
MF	7	Georgi Popov
FW	20	Vasil Mitkov
FW	19	Georgi Asparuhov
Substitutions:
DF	3	Ivan Dimitrov	(substituted on) 42'
FW	8	Hristo Bonev	(substituted on) 50'
Manager:
Stefan Bozhkov

GK	12	Mohammed Hazzaz
DF	3	Boujemaa Benkhrif
DF	13	Jalili Fadili
DF	4	Moulay Khanousi
DF	5	Kacem Slimani
MF	6	Mohammed Mahroufi
MF	8	Driss Bamous (c)	(substituted off) 46'
MF	10	Mohammed El Filali
MF	7	Said Ghandi
FW	17	Ahmed Alaoui	(substituted off) 74'
FW	11	Maouhoub Ghazouani
Substitutions:
FW	9	Ahmed Faras	(substituted on) 74'
MF	16	Moustapha Choukri	(substituted on) 46'
Manager:
(Socialist Federal Republic of Yugoslavia) Blagoje Vidinić

Assistant referees:
Tofiq Bahramov (Soviet Union)
Laurens van Ravens (Netherlands)

== See also ==
- Bulgaria at the FIFA World Cup
- Germany at the FIFA World Cup
- Morocco at the FIFA World Cup
- Peru at the FIFA World Cup
