= History of the Peru national football team =

The history of the Peru national football team dates back to the late 19th century, when English sailors and Peruvian travelers returning from England introduced the sport into Peru. It would take the early 20th century, in the year 1927, for Peru to finally create their first official national football team. Till the date, Peru has participated in five editions of the FIFA World Cup (1930, 1970, 1978, 1982 and 2018), its best results being the quarter-finals reached in 1970 and 1978, while in South America, it has been champion of the Copa América in 1939 and 1975.

== Introduction of football in Peru ==
Football was brought to Peru by English sailors in the late 19th century during their frequent visits to Callao, which was then an important port of the Pacific Ocean. During their free time, the English sailors played football and invited the local Chalacos (people from Callao) to participate. Allegedly, it was during these early games that the creation of the popular move known as the chalaca (short for "Chalacan Strike"), or bicycle kick, took place. By the 1890s, British sporting clubs in the Peruvian capital such as Lima Cricket and Lawn Tennis were already playing football. Football in Peru grew thanks to its practice by British residents and by Peruvians returning from England.

The growing sports rivalry between foreign visitors and local Chalacos soon gained the attention of Peruvians outside the port. Football was originally played outside of formal organizations, such as sport clubs or leagues, but the early 20th century saw the birth of clubs which continued the sport's practice. Among these early clubs of the amateur era were the English community's Lima Cricket and Football Club (Lima, 1859), later followed by the Peruvian Ciclista Lima Association (Lima, 1896), and Atlético Chalaco (Callao, 1899).

In the 1900s (decade), the construction of the Panama Canal limited the flow of foreign sailors and travelers into Callao, minimizing the port's influence as a center of cultural diffusion. By then, football clubs and leagues had sprouted in other Peruvian cities, including Lima, Cusco, and Arequipa. Some of the new clubs founded at this time were Alianza Lima (Lima, 1901), Cienciano (Cusco, 1901), FBC Melgar (Arequipa, 1915), the Italian community's Circolo Sportivo Italiano (Lima, 1917), Atletico Grau (Piura, 1919), Alianza Atletico (Sullana, 1920), Universitario de Deportes (Lima, 1924), Sport Boys (Callao, 1927), and Coronel Bolognesi (Tacna, 1929). Peru's most important amateur league, the capital province's "Peruvian Football League", housed the growing rivalry between Callao clubs and those from the nearby capital of Lima. The lack of a centralized organization led to constant conflicts between the teams, and one such conflict resulted in the creation of the Peruvian Football Federation in 1922, along with a new Peruvian Football League tournament under the regulation of said organization in 1926.

== 1920s: National team creation ==
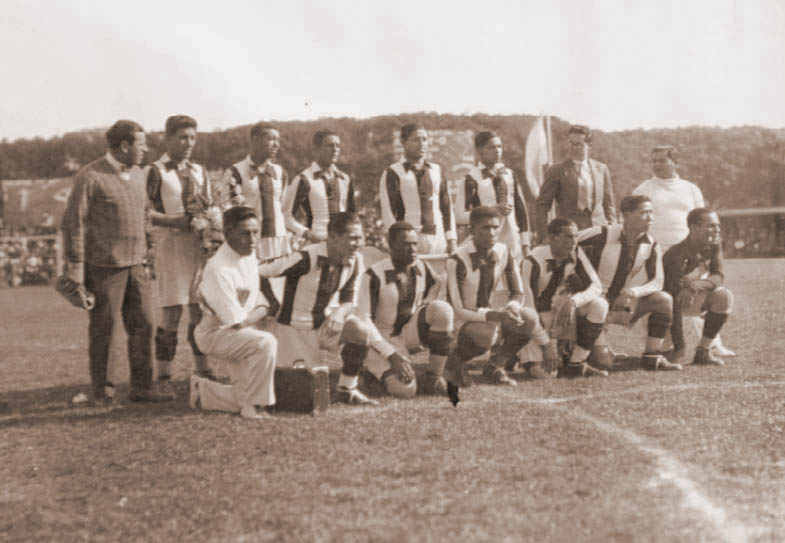
Peru in the 1927 South American Championship.

The Peruvian Football Federation joined CONMEBOL in 1925, but internal and economic problems prevented the creation of a national team that would officially represent the country internationally. In 1922, an unofficial national team played against an Uruguayan team sponsored by the Uruguayan Football Association. Subsequent years saw talented Peruvian football players gain international interest in their skills, which inspired Peruvian clubs to tour with success throughout South America to places such as Colombia, Venezuela, and Chile. Thanks to significant numbers of British residents in Peru, the acceptance of the game by the local elites, and the rapid development of the sport among the urban poor of La Victoria district in Lima, Peru formed the strongest footballing culture in the Andean region at this time.

In 1927, the Peru national team was officially created. The team hosted the 1927 South American Championship, and Peru reached third place after losing to Uruguay by 4–0 in their debut match, defeating Bolivia 3–2, and losing to Argentina 1–5. Nevertheless, due to internal corruption and the commotion surrounding the Great Depression, the team that played in the 1929 edition was selected by social favoritism rather than player skill, and lost all games. A year later, la Blanquirroja was invited to participate in a new intercontinental competition, to be held in Uruguay: the first World Cup.

== 1930s: First golden generation ==
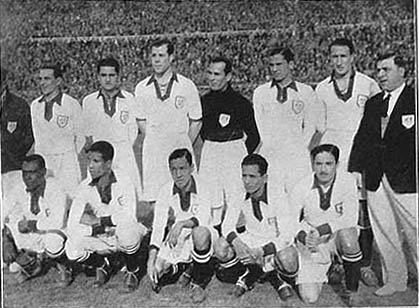
The Peru team that played Uruguay at the 1930 World Cup

The 1930s is considered to be the first golden era of Peruvian football. At the inaugural 1930 FIFA World Cup, the Peruvian team failed to progress beyond the group stages; despite this performance, the Uruguayan audience was surprised by the level of skill demonstrated by the Peruvians. Between 1933 and 1934, the national squad (composed mainly of players from Universitario de Deportes, Alianza Lima, and Atlético Chalaco) united with the Chilean squad (formed mainly by players from Colo-Colo) to form the Combinado del Pacifico (known by the European press as the "Peru-Chile XI" and "All-Pacific", among other names), which toured the European countries of England, Germany, France, and Spain until August 1935. Teodoro Fernandez became the team's top goal scorer with 48 goals in 39 games.

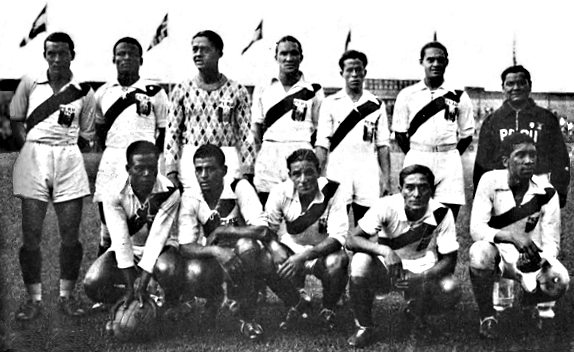
1936 Berlin Summer Olympics team

Peru was the only South American football representative in the 1936 Berlin Olympics. The team began the tournament well, defeating Finland 7–3. Players for Peru included Teodoro Fernández, Alejandro Villanueva, Juan Valdivieso, and Adelfo Magallanes. The IFFHS considers this Peruvian side to have been "a technically excellent and strong attacking side" that had "everything to be a finalist." The Peruvians went on to upset the Austrian Wunderteam, who were favorites to win the tournament, by defeating them 4–2 in extra time. After the game, the Austrian team alleged that the Peruvian players had manhandled them, and that Peruvian spectators, one brandishing a revolver, had swarmed down on the field during overtime. However, Peru was playing as the away team, almost without any supporters, and neither the nationality or identity of the spectators that entered the field during the regular time of play (not overtime) were ever discovered. Despite the lack of concrete evidence, the International Olympic Committee, which was essentially a FIFA committee presided by Jules Rimet, controversially nullified the result and ordered a re-match behind closed doors, which drove the Peruvian and Colombian delegations to forfeit the games in protest. The story was told differently by European and South American media; to this day, the exact details of what occurred are not known. Nowadays, the IFFHS is the only international football organization to condemn the actions taken against Peru in the tournament.

In 1938, Peru won its first international title at the first Bolivarian Games, defeating Bolivia, Ecuador, Colombia, and Venezuela. In 1939, la Blanquirroja won Peru's first South American Championship (known later as the Copa América). The Peruvians defeated the Uruguayan team by a close score of 2–1 in the final, after eliminating Ecuador, Chile, and Paraguay. Peru became the fourth nation to become South American champions, after Uruguay, Argentina, and Brazil.

== 1940s–1960s ==
By 1941, la Blanquirroja's star-studded squad was beginning to show its age. In the same year, Peru and Argentina played a three-game series for the Copa Roque Saenz Peña in Lima, and a struggling Peru managed to draw twice before finally losing the third match 3–0. The national squad's diminishing effectiveness was most apparent during the South American Championships of the 1940s, where the team's most positive performances came from goalkeeper José Soriano. Peru would not win another international title until 1947, when the side won the Bolivarian Games. Three years later, at the South American Championship held in Brazil, Peru gained third place after defeating Colombia, Ecuador, Bolivia, Chile, and Uruguay.

By the 1950s, Peru had once again become a major protagonist in South American football, ranking among the top 20 strongest football nations of the decade. In the Pan-American Championship of 1952 the Peruvians defeated Panama and Mexico, tied with Brazil and lost to Chile and Uruguay in close matches. Players such as Alberto Terry, Guillermo Barbadillo, Valeriano López, Félix Castillo, and Óscar Gómez Sánchez contributed to Peru's competitive play throughout the 1950s. During 1953 and 1954, Peru achieved its only two titles of the decade, twice winning the Copa del Pacífico (Pacific Cup), a trophy disputed between Chile and Peru every time the two sides play. In the 1955 South American Championship, the national squad's campaign took them to a third-place finish. Nonetheless, the team fared poorly at the Pan-American Championship held in Mexico, and the South American Championship in Montevideo. The team made a slight recovery as the decade closed, reaching fourth place at the 1957 and 1959 South American Championships, and defeating England 4–1 in an exhibition match.

During the 1960s, Peru showed signs of improvement, winning the Bolivarian Games in Barranquilla and qualifying for the 1960 Summer Olympics in Rome. However, these would be the only achievements of the decade, as Peru failed to place in the top four spots of the 1963 South American Championship, did not qualify for the Chile and England World Cups, and was unable to regain the Copa del Pacífico.

== 1970s: Second golden generation ==
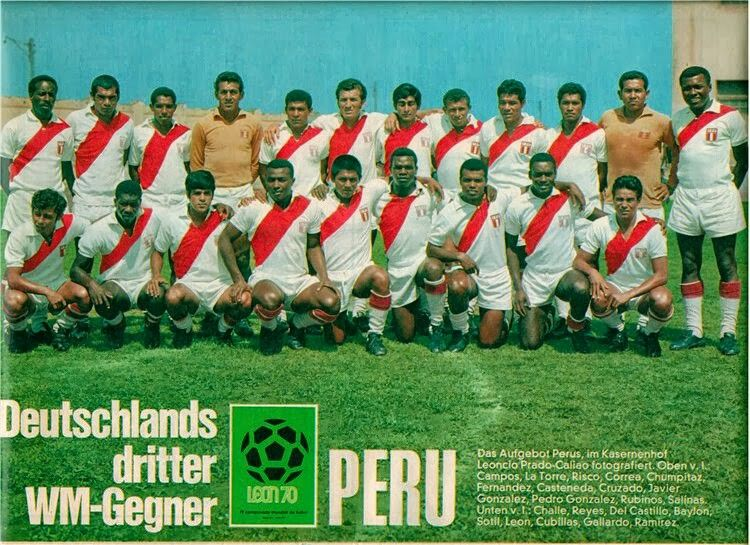
Promotional image featuring the squad for the 1970 FIFA World Cup. Standing, from left to right: Campos, de la Torre, Risco, Correa, Chumpitaz, Fernández, Castañeda, Cruzado, J. González, P. González, Rubiños and Salinas. Crouching: Challe, Reyes, del Castillo, Baylón, Sotil, León, Cubillas, Gallardo and Ramírez.

The story of the second golden generation started in late 1969, when la Blanquirroja qualified for the Mexico 1970 World Cup. Thanks to the goals of "Cachito" Ramírez, the squad tied Argentina at a game popularly known as "La Bombonera" (in reference to the Estadio Alberto J. Armando where the game was played). The squad, managed by "Didi" Pereira, followed a 4–2–4 formation that typically comprised José Fernández, Orlando de la Torre, Héctor Chumpitaz, and Nicolás Fuentes as the defenders; Ramón Mifflin and Roberto Challe as the midfielders; Julio Baylón, Pedro Pablo León, Teófilo Cubillas, and Alberto Gallardo as the forwards; and Luis Rubiños as the goalkeeper.

The participation of Peru in the 1970 FIFA World Cup was particularly memorable when the squad caused surprise as they advanced into the quarterfinals by defeating Bulgaria 3–2 and Morocco 3–0, and despite losing 3–1 to Germany. Although Peru lost the quarterfinal game to Brazil by 4–2, la Blanquirroja would go on to win the Copa del Pacífico, were invited to participate in the Brazil Independence Cup, and won the Copa Mariscal Sucre. Additionally, the squad won their second Copa América in 1975.

In 1978, la Blanquirroja once again qualified for a World Cup. The squad, led by Marcos Calderón, had a different (4–4–2) formation from the early 1970s structure. Jaime Duarte, Héctor Chumpitaz, Rubén Díaz, and Germán Leguía were on the defense; César Cueto, Percy Rojas, Teófilo Cubillas, and José Velásquez on the midfield; Juan José Muñante, Juan Carlos Oblitas, Guillermo La Rosa, and Hugo Sotil on the attack; and Ramón Quiroga as the goalkeeper.

Prior to the World Cup, the national squad defeated varied opponents such as China and Hungary. Once into the World Cup finals, Peru reached the top of their group after defeating Scotland (3–1), tying with the Netherlands (0–0), and defeating Iran (4–1). However, in the second round, Peru ended last in the group after losing to Brazil (0–3), Poland (0–1), and to Argentina (0–6) in a controversial match that some claim was bought by Argentina's military junta. After the tournament, the squad played some international friendlies to prepare for the Copa América of 1979; they would tie Scotland at Glasgow (1–1) and defeat Uruguay in Lima (2–0). Nonetheless, when the new tournament started, Peru was eliminated by Chile in the semifinals.

La Blanquirroja qualified for the 1982 FIFA World Cup at the expense of Colombia and Uruguay, the recent Mundialito winners. Under the direction of Tim, the Peruvians won the Pacific Cup and led a European and African tour in which la Blanquirroja defeated Hungary (2–1), France (1–0), tied Algeria (1–1), and upon their return defeated Romania (2–0). Tim's squad was composed of a 4–4–2 formation with Jaime Duarte, Rubén Toribio Díaz, Salvador Salguero, and Jorge Olaechea in defense; César Cueto, José Velásquez, Julio César Uribe, and Teófilo Cubillas in midfield; Gerónimo Barbadillo and Juan Carlos Oblitas as forwards; and Ramón Quiroga as goalkeeper. Once in the World Cup of Spain, the team did not perform well as they tied with Cameroon and Italy, and lost 5–1 against Poland. Peru's elimination marked the end of an era where the team's "flowing football was admired across the globe."

== 1980s–2000s ==
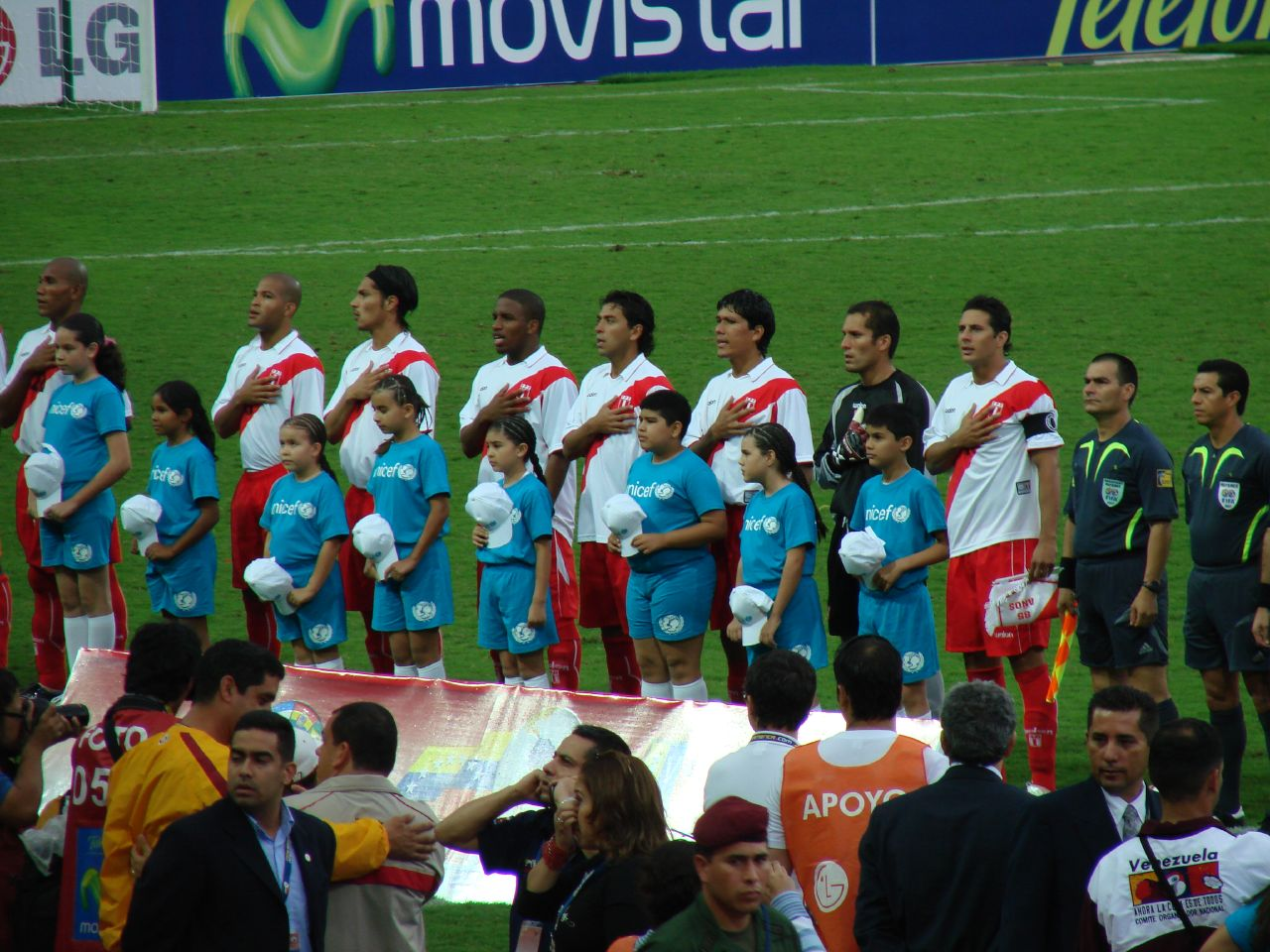
Peru in the 2007 Copa América.

Peru nearly qualified for the 1986 World Cup. The team needed a victory against Argentina in order to directly qualify to the World Cup, but an Argentina led by Diego Maradona obtained a draw that forced Peru to participate in a play-off game against Chile, which Peru lost. Despite the adverse result, that same year Peru was invited to participate in its first Asian tournament, the Nehru Cup of India. In the 1987 Copa América, which began the alphabetical host rotation system, la Blanquirroja was unable to advance past the first round despite tying hosts Argentina (1–1) and rivals Ecuador (1–1).

Tragedy struck on December 8, 1987, when the airplane carrying Alianza Lima's team and coaching staff crashed into the Pacific Ocean. Several victims were national team members. Among the dead were midfielder José Casanova, goalkeeper José González Ganoza, forwards Luis Escobar and Alfredo Tomassini, and coach Marcos Calderón. Nonetheless, in 1989 Peru attained second and third places in the Marlboro Cup and the Copa Centenario de Armenia 1989 (in Armenia, Colombia), respectively. However, Peru only won two games (5–1 against Venezuela in 1991, and 1–0 against Chile in 1993) in the next four Copa América editions. Moreover, Peru did not win a single game in the 1990 and 1994 World Cup qualifiers, ending up last in both of its groups and prolonging the team's absence from the world stage.

Peru's situation improved over time as the team attained fourth place at the 1997 Copa América, third place at the 1997 U.S. Cup, and in 1998 (in the newly implemented round-robin tournament) barely missed the chance to appear in the World Cup tournament due to their goal difference with Chile. In 1999, the team won its first Kirin Cup, and would attain a second title in the Japanese competition in 2005. In the year 2000, the team was invited to join the CONCACAF Gold Cup tournament along with Colombia and South Korea, and earned third place in the North American competition. Nevertheless, la Blanquirroja struggled in World Cup qualifiers, earning eighth place in the 2002 and 2006 editions. Meanwhile, Peru consistently reached the quarterfinals in the 1999, 2001, 2004, and 2007 editions of the Copa América.

In 2007, Peru's U-17 squad surprised the nation by qualifying and reaching the quarterfinals of the 2007 FIFA U-17 World Cup. Meanwhile, under corruption charges, Peruvian Football Federation (FPF) president Manuel Burga's re-election was made illegal by the Peruvian government. Due to this, in November 2008, FIFA suspended several FPF authorities, as well as several Peruvian Football League authorities and referees; additionally, the national team was barred from participating in international competition, under allegations of irregularities between the FPF, the Peruvian Institute of Sports (IPD), and the Peruvian government. After IPD president Arturo Woodman agreed to discuss matters and reach an agreement with the FPF, FIFA President Sepp Blatter lifted the bans and restrictions. The problem prevented Peru's hosting of the 2009 South American Youth Championship; the tournament was held in Venezuela instead. With FIFA's approval, the FPF later reappointed Burga.

== 2010s ==
During 2010 FIFA World Cup qualification, a corruption and discipline scandal shook the national team as Peruvian journalists Jaime Bayly and Magaly Medina revealed that a series of Peru's most recognized players, including Claudio Pizarro, Andrés Mendoza, Santiago Acasiete, Paolo Guerrero, and Jefferson Farfán, were seen at nightclubs and parties only days before the team was scheduled to play qualifier matches. Several players were banned from playing for the national team while others were put under investigation.

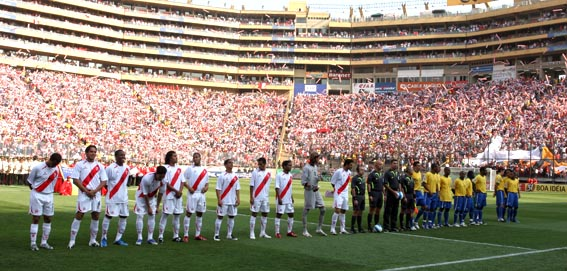
Peru lining up for a qualifier against Brazil.

Peru's hopes of qualifying for the 2010 World Cup were dashed early on, as the team was the first CONMEBOL squad to be eliminated from the finals. The Peruvian sports press dubbed the current squad "Los Hijos de Burga" (the "Sons of Burga"), in reference to the FPF's president, who was widely blamed for Peru's terrible qualifying campaign. The press went on to name the squad the worst in the national team's 82-year history, amidst calls for Burga's resignation. Following the end of the qualifiers, Juan Manuel Vargas and Nolberto Solano, who officially retired from the team at this time, expressed their hopes to change the way things were going for the national squad. The team finished the qualifying tournament in last place, with only 3 victories and 13 points. In the August 2009 FIFA World Rankings, Peru was 91st, its lowest ranking to date. Despite the abysmal showing in qualifiers, the team managed credible draws with Brazil and Argentina.

On July 2, 2010, Uruguayan Sergio Markarián took charge of the national team with the task of leading Peru in the 2011 Copa América and the 2014 FIFA World Cup. His work with the national team received positive comments from Pelé, and an early award as Peru won the Kirin Cup for a third time. Markarián's first challenge came in the form of another discipline scandal, which he resolved by temporarily banning Jefferson Farfán, Reimond Manco, and John Galliquio.

La Blanquirroja would next achieve third place at the 2011 Copa América, despite several of the team's key figures missing due to injuries. This has greatly boosted confidence for the Peruvian team toward the upcoming 2014 FIFA World Cup qualification, but despite this high hope, indiscipline problem haunted the Peruvian squad, as the team went on to be knocked down following a 1–2 home loss to Uruguay. This shocking elimination culminated hostile reaction from fans, and rocked the chair of then-President of FPF Manuel Burga, who had been responsible for already earlier elimination in 2010 World Cup qualifiers. Sergio Markarián stepped down as manager of Peru following the defeat. Eventually, Manuel Burga would step down as President of the FPF and replaced by businessman and inexperienced Edwin Oviedo. Burga would be later prosecuted and arrested for corruption charge, eventually acquitted after investigation, but was permanently banned from football activities by FIFA in 2019.

Under new leadership of Edwin Oviedo, the FPF began a systematic purge of corruption and the leadership, resulted with Juan Carlos Oblitas appointed as new technical director for the FPF. Under supervision of Oblitas, the FPF appointed Ricardo Gareca as new coach of Peru. Gareca's arrival was met with skepticism and hostility by Peruvian media, having previously never coached any national team and his major success only lied with Vélez Sarsfield, as well as his goal that led to Peru's elimination from the 1986 FIFA World Cup qualification.

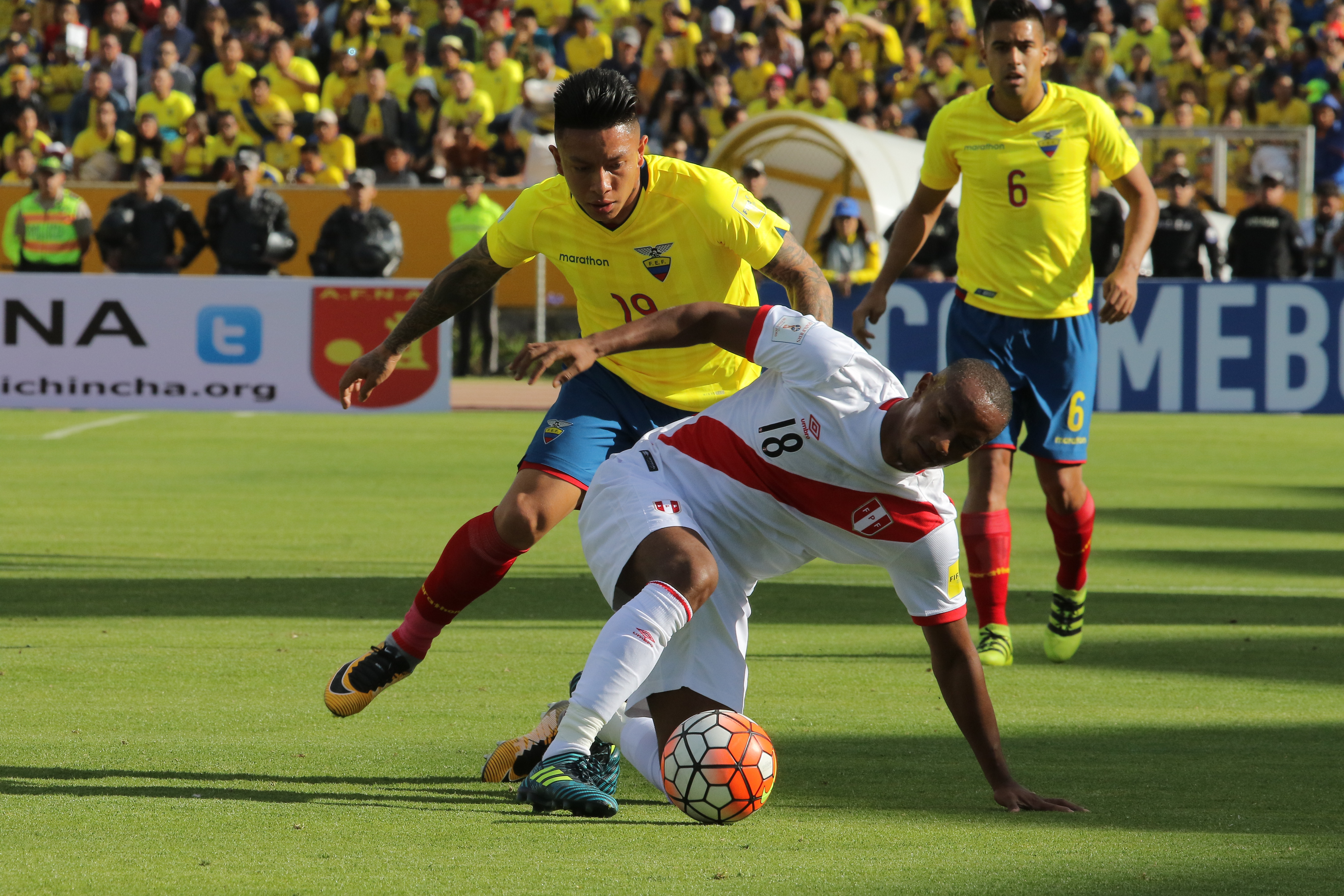
André Carrillo up against Ecuador's Cristian Ramírez during the 2018 qualifiers.

Gareca's first match as coach of Peru was against Venezuela, where Peru lost 0–1, increased skepticism and hostility from Peruvian media toward the country's perpetration for the 2015 Copa América. Despite this, however, Peru would go on to have a memorable performance, occupying third place for the second times. After finishing third, Peru began their 2018 FIFA World Cup qualification quest, but out of seven opening games, Peru only beat Paraguay at home 1–0, and was near the verge of elimination after a 0–2 away loss to Bolivia; but Nelson David Cabrera's eligibility to Bolivia, having represented Paraguay, was later put to question, eventually led to FIFA awarding Chile and Peru 3–0 win each. The 3–0 win awarded for Peru, at the time was little meaning, turned to be an important point on Peru's later performance.

Peru would also participate in the Copa América Centenario where Gareca led Peru to another outstanding performance, eliminating powerhouse Brazil in process, but lost to Colombia on penalty in the quarter-finals. From there, Peru would have an amazing performance in the later half of the 2018 World Cup qualification, with the team only lost to Chile away and Brazil at home, and managed to hold Argentina twice, before held Colombia 1–1 at home to reach the playoff with New Zealand, eliminating Chile though not without controversy. In the playoff, Peru overcame New Zealand 2–0 on aggregate, to finally qualify for the first ever FIFA World Cup after 36 years with Gareca accredited for the success, in an ironic way as Peru was eliminated by Gareca's goal back in 1985.

In the 2018 FIFA World Cup, Peru played against France, Denmark and Australia. The Peruvian side played well, but lost two first matches to Denmark and France 0–1 and got eliminated. Before departing from World Cup, Peru recorded its first ever goal and first ever win in 36 years, beating Australia 2–0 in fashion. Despite the team's early elimination, Gareca was praised for creating and sensationalizing a new Peruvian team, and he continued to coach Peru for the upcoming 2019 Copa América.

The 2019 Copa América became another memorable tournament for Peru, with the team reached its first final after 44 years. Peru, however, had a relatively poor form in the group stage, drawing Venezuela goalless, beating Bolivia 3–1 before got smashed 0–5 by host Brazil and only managed to finish in third place, facing Uruguay in the quarter-finals. The Peruvian side would go on beating Uruguay in shock, after a goalless draw, Peru won in penalty 5–4, facing Chile in the semi-finals. There, Peru achieved a resounding 3-0 victory over the Chileans to enter the final, setting up the second match against Brazil. Though Peru would go on failing to win the title, falling 1–3 to the host, it became another memorable success of Peruvian football team. After finishing the tournament, Paolo Guerrero became the top scorer along with the Brazilian Everton with three goals.

== Recent history ==
=== 2021 Copa América ===
For the 2021 Copa América, the national team traveled to Brazil with the aim of playing the tournament in the forty-seventh edition of the competition. The Peruvian team, led by Ricardo Gareca, together with the host Brazil, Colombia, Ecuador and Venezuela formed group B of the contest. The team debuted with a heavy 0–4 defeat against the Brazilian team. Subsequently, Peru obtained a 2–1 victory against Colombia with goals from Sergio Peña and an own goal from Yerry Mina, in the next game, Peru tied against Ecuador 2–2 with goals from Gianluca Lapadula and André Carrillo.
