= Football at the 1971 Mediterranean Games – Men's team squads =

Below are the squads selected for the football tournament at the 1971 Mediterranean Games hosted in the city of İzmir in Turkey, which took place on 6–16 October 1971.

The teams were national Under-20 sides.

== Group A ==
=== France Amateur ===
Coach: André Grillon

| No. | Pos. | Player | Date of birth (age) | Caps | Goals | Club |
|---|---|---|---|---|---|---|
| | GK | Alain Gouraud | 22 June 1946 (aged 25) | | | (French Football Federation) Angers SCO |
| | GK | André Lannoy | 1 March 1945 (aged 26) | | | (French Football Federation) RC Lens |
| | DF | Paul Imiéla | 23 January 1943 (aged 28) | | | (French Football Federation) Amiens SC |
| | DF | Denis Bourdon | 1 January 1952 (aged 19) | | | (French Football Federation) Le Havre AC |
| | DF | Alain Perra | 20 August 1952 (aged 19) | | | (French Football Federation) AS Aix-en-Provence |
| | MF | René Riefa | 27 June 1945 (aged 26) | | | (French Football Federation) AC Avignonnais |
| | MF | Michel Granier | 10 September 1951 (aged 20) | | | (French Football Federation) FC de Sète 34 |
| | MF | Jean-Paul Bouffandeau | 29 March 1949 (aged 22) | | | (French Football Federation) Le Mans FC |
| | MF | Jean-Christian Lang | 22 August 1950 (aged 21) | | | (French Football Federation) FC Sochaux-Montbéliard |
| | MF | Alain Le Roux | 6 September 1947 (aged 24) | | | (French Football Federation) Lille OSC |
| | MF | Jean-Claude Ribeyre | 24 September 1945 (aged 26) | | | (French Football Federation) Stade Brestois 29 |
| | DF | Louis Romier | 6 January 1946 (aged 25) | | | (French Football Federation) Montluçon Football |
| | FW | Jean-Michel Aubert | 1947 (aged 24) | | | (French Football Federation) AC Arlésien |
| | FW | Jean-Louis Brost | 30 May 1951 (aged 20) | | | (French Football Federation) Paris Saint-Germain FC |
| | FW | Ange Di Caro | 1 January 1949 (aged 22) | | | (French Football Federation) AS Aix-en-Provence |
| | FW | Pierre Mankowski | 4 November 1951 (aged 19) | | | (French Football Federation) Amiens SC |
| | FW | Pierre Bouveresse | 1947 (aged 24) | | | (French Football Federation) AS Baume-les-Dames |
| | FW | René Exbrayat | 30 October 1947 (aged 23) | | | (French Football Federation) AC Arlésien |

=== Syria ===
Coach: Khalil Nadaf

| No. | Pos. | Player | Date of birth (age) | Caps | Goals | Club |
|---|---|---|---|---|---|---|
| | GK | Fares Salteji | | | | (Syrian Football Association) Al-Jaish |
| | GK | Zouheir | | | | (Syrian Football Association) |
| | DF | Ahmed Jabban | | | | (Syrian Football Association) Al-Jaish |
| | DF | Mahmoud Toughaly | | | | (Syrian Football Association) Al-Jaish |
| | DF | Riyadh Mohammed Asfahani | 13 March 1952 (aged 19) | | | (Syrian Football Association) |
| | DF | Farouk Sareieh | | | | (Syrian Football Association) |
| | MF | Abdulhafiz Arab | 27 November 1947 (aged 23) | | | (Syrian Football Association) Al-Jaish |
| | MF | Abdulghani Tatish | | | | (Syrian Football Association) Al-Jaish |
| | MF | Samir Saeed | | | | (Syrian Football Association) Al-Jaish |
| | FW | Joseph Shahristan | | | | (Syrian Football Association) Al-Jaish |
| | FW | Abdul Salam Sman | | | | (Syrian Football Association) Al Ittihad Ahli |
| | FW | Ghassan Kuzbari | | | | |
| | DF | Hanna | | | | |
| | MF | M. Ghassen | | | | |

=== Tunisia ===
Coach: Hameur Hizem

| No. | Pos. | Player | Date of birth (age) | Caps | Goals | Club |
|---|---|---|---|---|---|---|
| | GK | Sadok "Attouga" Sassi | 15 November 1945 (aged 25) | | | (Tunisian Football Federation) Club Africain |
| | DF | Moncef Melliti | 18 July 1948 (aged 23) | | | (Tunisian Football Federation) CS Sfaxien |
| | DF | Hamza Mrad | 1 January 1953 (aged 18) | | | (Tunisian Football Federation) CS Sfaxien |
| | DF | Ahmed Mghirbi | 17 June 1946 (aged 25) | | | (Tunisian Football Federation) Stade Tunisien |
| | DF | Mohammed Zouaoui | | | | (Tunisian Football Federation) |
| | MF | Moncef Khouini | 4 November 1951 (aged 19) | | | (Tunisian Football Federation) Club Africain |
| | MF | Tahar Chaïbi | 17 February 1946 (aged 25) | | | (Tunisian Football Federation) Club Africain |
| | MF | Ahmed Zitouni | 26 May 1947 (aged 24) | | | (Tunisian Football Federation) Club Africain |
| | MF | Rachid Zlassi | | | | (Tunisian Football Federation) ES Sahel |
| | MF | Abdelmajid Ben Mrad | 25 February 1949 (aged 22) | | | (Tunisian Football Federation) ES Tunis |
| | FW | Abdessalem Chemmam | | | | (Tunisian Football Federation) AS Marsa |
| | FW | Ezzedine Chakroun | 13 June 1948 (aged 23) | | | (Tunisian Football Federation) Sfax RS |
| | FW | Abdesselam Adhouma | 12 February 1949 (aged 22) | | | (Tunisian Football Federation) ES Sahel |
| | FW | Abderraouf Ben Aziza | 23 September 1953 (aged 18) | | | (Tunisian Football Federation) ES Sahel |

=== Turkey ===
Coach: Doğan Andaç

| No. | Pos. | Player | Date of birth (age) | Caps | Goals | Club |
|---|---|---|---|---|---|---|
| | GK | Mustafa Güngören | 8 May 1951 (aged 20) | | | (Turkish Football Federation) Altınordu |
| | | Ekrem Günalp | 20 September 1949 (aged 22) | | | (Turkish Football Federation) Galatasaray |
| | | Timuçin Çuğ | 14 September 1951 (aged 20) | | | (Turkish Football Federation) Ankara Demirspor |
| | | Sacit Karabaş | 1 June 1952 (aged 19) | | | (Turkish Football Federation) Bursaspor |
| | | Cemal Karagöz | | | | (Turkish Football Federation) Gaziantepspor |
| | | Ali Erdin | | | | (Turkish Football Federation) Kütahyaspor |
| | | Müjdat Yalman | 14 August 1949 (aged 22) | | | (Turkish Football Federation) MKE Ankaragücü |
| | | Mustafa Ergücü | 15 January 1955 (aged 16) | | | (Turkish Football Federation) İzmirspor |
| | | Zafer Göncüler | 22 November 1950 (aged 20) | | | (Turkish Football Federation) MKE Ankaragücü |
| | | Hıdır Bilek | 27 October 1948 (aged 22) | | | (Turkish Football Federation) Altay |
| | | Adem Kurukaya | | | | (Turkish Football Federation) Samsunspor |
| | | Baykul Tüysüz | 18 August 1952 (aged 19) | | | (Turkish Football Federation) Feriköy |
| | FW | Ali Osman Renklibay | 24 October 1948 (aged 22) | | | (Turkish Football Federation) Adanaspor |
| | FW | Sinan Bür | 15 November 1950 (aged 20) | | | (Turkish Football Federation) Bursaspor |
| | DF | Nikos Kovis | 6 January 1953 (aged 18) | | | (Turkish Football Federation) Vefa |
| | | Ali Çağlar | | | | (Turkish Football Federation) Göztepe |
| | DF | Özer Yurteri | 28 December 1949 (aged 21) | | | (Turkish Football Federation) Göztepe |
| | FW | Şevki Şenlen | 22 July 1949 (aged 22) | | | (Turkish Football Federation) Eskişehirspor |

== Group B ==
=== Egypt ===
Coach: (Germany) Dettmar Cramer

| No. | Pos. | Player | Date of birth (age) | Caps | Goals | Club |
|---|---|---|---|---|---|---|
| | GK | Hassan Ali | | | | (Egyptian Football Association) Tersana SC |
| | GK | Hassan Mokhtar | 26 January 1944 (aged 27) | | | (Egyptian Football Association) Ismaily SC |
| | DF | Mohammed El-Seyagui | 20 January 1949 (aged 22) | | | (Egyptian Football Association) Ghazl El Mahalla SC |
| | DF | Hany Moustafa | 27 October 1947 (aged 23) | | | (Egyptian Football Association) Al Ahly SC |
| | MF | Ibrahim El-Khalil | | | | (Egyptian Football Association) Tersana SC |
| | MF | Moustafa Reyadh | 5 April 1941 (aged 30) | | | (Kuwait Football Association) Al-Salmiya SC |
| | MF | Mohammed Ibrahim El-Mazati | | | | (Egyptian Football Association) Al Ittihad Alexandria |
| | MF | Samir Qotb | 16 March 1938 (aged 33) | | | (Egyptian Football Association) Zamalek SC |
| | MF | Farouk Gaafar | 29 October 1952 (aged 18) | | | (Egyptian Football Association) Zamalek SC |
| | FW | Farouk Mahmoud | 18 October 1944 (aged 26) | | | (Egyptian Football Association) Zamalek SC |
| | FW | Hassan El-Shazly | 13 November 1943 (aged 27) | | | (Egyptian Football Association) Tersana SC |
| | FW | Sayed Abdel Razek | 1 January 1946 (aged 25) | | | (Egyptian Football Association) Ismaily SC |

=== Greece Olympic ===
Coach: Giorgos Gasparis

| No. | Pos. | Player | Date of birth (age) | Caps | Goals | Club |
|---|---|---|---|---|---|---|
| | GK | Kiourtselidis | | | | (Hellenic Football Federation) PAOK FC |
| | DF | Filotas Pellios | 22 March 1953 (aged 18) | | | (Hellenic Football Federation) PAOK FC |
| | DF | Koulis Apostolidis | 3 March 1946 (aged 25) | | | (Hellenic Football Federation) PAOK FC |
| | MF | Georgios Chatzaras | 23 November 1953 (aged 17) | | | (Hellenic Football Federation) Aris Thessaloniki F.C. |
| | MF | Georgios Deligiannis | 26 September 1948 (aged 23) | | | (Hellenic Football Federation) Aris Thessaloniki F.C. |
| | MF | Georgios Paraschos | 23 August 1952 (aged 19) | | | (Hellenic Football Federation) PAOK FC |
| | | Zafiropoulos | | | | (Hellenic Football Federation) AEK Athens F.C. |
| | | Manios | | | | (Hellenic Football Federation) Kampaniakos F.C. |
| | | Tsagalidis | | | | (Hellenic Football Federation) PAOK FC |
| | | Deligiannis | | | | (Hellenic Football Federation) Aris Thessaloniki F.C. |

=== Morocco ===
Coach: (Spain) Sabino Barinaga

| No. | Pos. | Player | Date of birth (age) | Caps | Goals | Club |
|---|---|---|---|---|---|---|
| | GK | Allal Benkassou | 30 November 1941 (aged 29) | | | (Royal Moroccan Football Federation) FAR Rabat |
| | DF | Larbi Ahardane | 6 June 1954 (aged 17) | | | (Royal Moroccan Football Federation) Wydad AC |
| | DF | Boujemaa Benkhrif | | | | (Royal Moroccan Football Federation) KAC Kenitra |
| | DF | Kacem Slimani | 1 July 1948 (aged 23) | | | (Royal Moroccan Football Federation) RS Settat |
| | MF | Abdallah Tazi | 30 November 1944 (aged 26) | | | (Royal Moroccan Football Federation) MAS Fes |
| | MF | Abdelâali Zahraoui | 9 January 1949 (aged 22) | | | (Royal Moroccan Football Federation) FAR Rabat |
| | MF | Driss Bamous | 15 December 1942 (aged 28) | | | (Royal Moroccan Football Federation) FAR Rabat |
| | MF | Maouhoub Ghazouani | | | | (Royal Moroccan Football Federation) FAR Rabat |
| | MF | Mustapha Choukri | | | | (Royal Moroccan Football Federation) Raja CA |
| | MF | Abdallah Lamrani | | | | (Royal Moroccan Football Federation) FAR Rabat |
| | FW | Ahmed Faras | 7 December 1946 (aged 24) | | | (Royal Moroccan Football Federation) Chabab Mohammédia |
| | FW | Mohamed El Filali | 9 July 1945 (aged 26) | | | (Royal Moroccan Football Federation) MC Oujda |
| | FW | Abdelkader Ben Bouali | | | | (Royal Moroccan Football Federation) |

=== Yugoslavia ===
Head coach: Aleksandar Tirnanić, Coach: Dražan Jerković

| No. | Pos. | Player | Date of birth (age) | Caps | Club |
|---|---|---|---|---|---|
| | GK | Ivan Ćurković | 15 March 1944 (aged 27) | | (Socialist Federal Republic of Yugoslavia) Partizan |
| | DF | Radivoje Drašković | 6 May 1943 (aged 28) | | (Socialist Federal Republic of Yugoslavia) Proleter Zrenjanin |
| | DF | Ljubiša Drenovaković | | | (Socialist Federal Republic of Yugoslavia) Red Star Belgrade |
| | FW | Todor Grebenarević | 13 May 1944 (aged 27) | | (Socialist Federal Republic of Yugoslavia) Radnički Niš |
| | MF | Dušan Jovanović | 4 November 1946 (aged 24) | | (Socialist Federal Republic of Yugoslavia) OFK Beograd |
| | FW | Ilija Katić | 20 July 1945 (aged 26) | | (Socialist Federal Republic of Yugoslavia) Partizan |
| | DF | Josip Kečkeš | 3 June 1952 (aged 19) | | (Socialist Federal Republic of Yugoslavia) Dinamo Zagreb |
| | FW | Aleksandar Milojković | 19 October 1950 (aged 20) | | (Socialist Federal Republic of Yugoslavia) Vojvodina |
| | MF | Bora Milutinović | 7 September 1944 (aged 27) | | (Socialist Federal Republic of Yugoslavia) Partizan |
| | MF | Mesud Nalić | 12 May 1943 (aged 28) | | (Socialist Federal Republic of Yugoslavia) Sloboda Tuzla |
| | FW | Marijan Novak | 2 October 1947 (aged 24) | | (Socialist Federal Republic of Yugoslavia) Dinamo Zagreb |
| | FW | Aleksandar Panajotović | 28 January 1952 (aged 19) | | (Socialist Federal Republic of Yugoslavia) Red Star Belgrade |
| | GK | Ognjen Petrović | 2 January 1948 (aged 23) | | (Socialist Federal Republic of Yugoslavia) Red Star Belgrade |
| | MF | Josip Pirmajer | 14 February 1944 (aged 27) | | (Socialist Federal Republic of Yugoslavia) Vojvodina |
| | DF | Branko Radović | 18 October 1950 (aged 20) | | (Socialist Federal Republic of Yugoslavia) Red Star Belgrade |
| | MF | Vladimir Savić | 7 November 1945 (aged 25) | | (Socialist Federal Republic of Yugoslavia) Vojvodina |
| | MF | Ištvan Šanta | | | (Socialist Federal Republic of Yugoslavia) Crvenka |
| | GK | Momčilo Vujačić | 3 March 1946 (aged 25) | | (Socialist Federal Republic of Yugoslavia) Čelik Zenica |
