= Morocco at the FIFA World Cup =

International football delegation

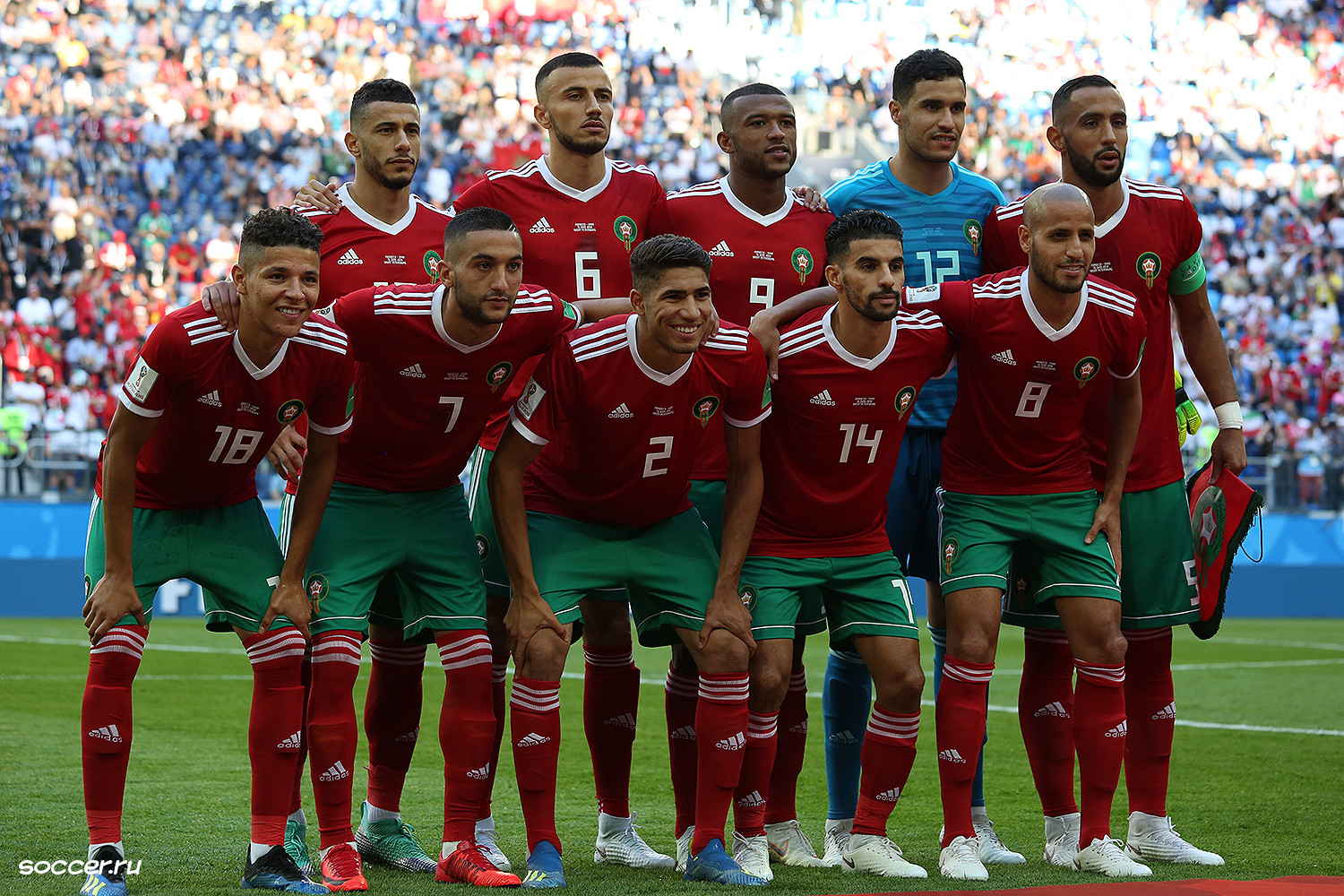
Morocco national team at the 2018 World Cup in Russia

The FIFA World Cup, often simply called the World Cup, is an international association football competition contested by the men's national teams of the members of Fédération Internationale de Football Association (FIFA), the sport's global governing body. The championship has been awarded every four years since the first tournament in 1930, except in 1942 and 1946, due to World War II.

The tournament consists of two parts, the qualification phase and the final phase (officially called the World Cup Finals). The qualification phase, which currently takes place over the three years preceding the Finals, is used to determine which teams qualify for the Finals. The current format of the Finals involves 48 teams competing for the title, at venues within the host nation (or nations) over a period of about a month. The World Cup final is the most widely viewed sporting event in the world, with an estimated 715.1 million people watching the 2006 tournament final.

Morocco has qualified for the final stages of the FIFA World Cup on seven occasions, which were in 1970, 1986, 1994, 1998, 2018, 2022 and 2026. Their best performance was in 2022, when they finished in fourth place, thus becoming both the first African and Arab nation to reach a semi-final at a World Cup.

Morocco is set to become the second African nation, the second MENA nation, the first North African and the second Arab nation to host the World Cup when it was granted host status for the 2030 edition alongside the two European countries Portugal and Spain.

== Overall record ==
FIFA World Cup record									FIFA World Cup qualification record					
Year	Round	Position	Pld	W	D	L	GF	GA	Pld	W	D	L	GF	GA
(Uruguay) 1930	Not a FIFA member								Not a FIFA member					
(Italy) 1934	Not a FIFA member								Not a FIFA member					
(France) 1938	Not a FIFA member								Not a FIFA member					
(Brazil) 1950	Not a FIFA member								Not a FIFA member					
(Switzerland) 1954	Not a FIFA member								Not a FIFA member					
(Sweden) 1958	Not a FIFA member								Not a FIFA member					
(Chile) 1962	Did not qualify								7	2	2	3	7	8
(England) 1966	Withdrew								Withdrew					
(Mexico) 1970	Group stage	14th	3	0	1	2	2	6	10	4	4	2	11	7
(West Germany) 1974	Did not qualify								10	4	3	3	12	13
(Argentina) 1978	Did not qualify								2	0	2	0	2	2
(Spain) 1982	Did not qualify								8	3	2	3	5	6
(Mexico) 1986	Round of 16	11th	4	1	2	1	3	2	8	5	2	1	12	1
(Italy) 1990	Did not qualify								6	1	3	2	4	5
(United States) 1994	Group stage	23rd	3	0	0	3	2	5	10	7	2	1	19	4
(France) 1998	Group stage	18th	3	1	1	1	5	5	6	5	1	0	14	2
(South Korea) (Japan) 2002	Did not qualify								10	6	3	1	11	3
(Germany) 2006	Did not qualify								10	5	5	0	17	7
(South Africa) 2010	Did not qualify								10	3	3	4	14	13
(Brazil) 2014	Did not qualify								6	2	3	1	9	8
(Russia) 2018	Group stage	27th	3	0	1	2	2	4	8	4	3	1	13	1
(Qatar) 2022	Fourth place	4th	7	3	2	2	6	5	8	7	1	0	25	3
(Canada) (Mexico) (United States) 2026	Quarter-finals	7th	6	3	2	1	10	6	8	8	0	0	22	2
(Morocco) (Portugal) (Spain) 2030	Qualified as co-hosts								Qualified as co-hosts					
(Saudi Arabia) 2034	To be determined								To be determined					
Total	Fourth place	7/23	29	8	9	12	30	33	127	66	39	22	197	85

Morocco's World Cup record
First match	Morocco 1–2 Germany (León, Mexico; 3 June 1970)
Biggest Win	Morocco 3–0 Scotland (Saint-Étienne, France; 23 June 1998); Morocco 3–0 Canada (Houston, United States; 4 July 2026)
Biggest Defeat	Peru 3–0 Morocco (León, Mexico; 6 June 1970); Brazil 3–0 Morocco (Nantes, France; 16 June 1998)
Best Result	Fourth place in 2022
Worst Result	Group stage in 1970, 1994, 1998, 2018

== List of matches ==
World Cup	Round	Date	Opponent	Score	Result	Morocco scorers	Ref.
(Mexico) 1970	Group 4	3 June 1970	West Germany	1–2	L	Jarir	
(Mexico) 1970	Group 4	6 June 1970	Peru	0–3	L	—	
(Mexico) 1970	Group 4	11 June 1970	Bulgaria	1–1	D	Ghazouani	
(Mexico) 1986	Group F	2 June 1986	Poland	0–0	D	—	
(Mexico) 1986	Group F	6 June 1986	England	0–0	D	—	
(Mexico) 1986	Group F	11 June 1986	Portugal	3–1	W	Khairi (2), Merry	
(Mexico) 1986	Round of 16	17 June 1986	West Germany	0–1	L	—	
(United States) 1994	Group F	19 June 1994	Belgium	0–1	L	—	
(United States) 1994	Group F	25 June 1994	Saudi Arabia	1–2	L	Chaouch	
(United States) 1994	Group F	29 June 1994	Netherlands	1–2	L	Nader	
(France) 1998	Group A	10 June 1998	Norway	2–2	D	Hadji, Hadda	
(France) 1998	Group A	16 June 1998	Brazil	0–3	L	—	
(France) 1998	Group A	23 June 1998	Scotland	3–0	W	Bassir (2), Hadda	
(Russia) 2018	Group B	15 June 2018	Iran	0–1	L	—	
(Russia) 2018	Group B	20 June 2018	Portugal	0–1	L	—	
(Russia) 2018	Group B	25 June 2018	Spain	2–2	D	Boutaïb, En-Nesyri	
(Qatar) 2022	Group F	23 November 2022	Croatia	0–0	D	—	
(Qatar) 2022	Group F	27 November 2022	Belgium	2–0	W	Saïss, Aboukhlal	
(Qatar) 2022	Group F	1 December 2022	Canada	2–1	W	En-Nesyri, Ziyech	
(Qatar) 2022	Round of 16	6 December 2022	Spain	0–0 (a.e.t.) (3–0 p)	D	—	
(Qatar) 2022	Quarter-finals	10 December 2022	Portugal	1–0	W	En-Nesyri	
(Qatar) 2022	Semi-finals	14 December 2022	France	0–2	L	—	
(Qatar) 2022	Match for third place	17 December 2022	Croatia	1–2	L	Dari	
(Canada) (United States) (Mexico) 2026	Group C	13 June 2026	Brazil	1–1	D	Saibari	
(Canada) (United States) (Mexico) 2026	Group C	19 June 2026	Scotland	1–0	W	Saibari	
(Canada) (United States) (Mexico) 2026	Group C	24 June 2026	Haiti	4–2	W	Hakimi, Saibari, Rahimi, Yassine	
(Canada) (United States) (Mexico) 2026	Round of 32	29 June 2026	Netherlands	1–1 (a.e.t.) (3–2 p)	D	Diop	
(Canada) (United States) (Mexico) 2026	Round of 16	4 July 2026	Canada	3–0	W	Ounahi (2), Rahimi	
(Canada) (United States) (Mexico) 2026	Quarter-finals	9 July 2026	France	0–2	L	—	
(Portugal) (Spain) (Morocco) 2030	TBA	June 2030	TBA				
(Portugal) (Spain) (Morocco) 2030	TBA	June 2030	TBA				
(Portugal) (Spain) (Morocco) 2030	TBA	June 2030	TBA				

=== 1970 FIFA World Cup ===
==== Group Stage ====
Pos	Team	Pld	W	D	L	GF	GA	GD	Pts	Qualification
1	West Germany	3	3	0	0	10	4	+6	6	Advance to knockout stage
2	Peru	3	2	0	1	7	5	+2	4	Advance to knockout stage
3	Bulgaria	3	0	1	2	5	9	−4	1	
3	Morocco	3	0	1	2	2	6	−4	1	

Source: FIFA
3 June 1970
16:00

West Germany	2–1	Morocco
Seeler 56'; Müller 80'		Jarir 21'

Estadio Nou Camp, León
Attendance: 12,942
Referee: Laurens van Ravens (Netherlands)

6 June 1970
16:00

Peru	3–0	Morocco
Cubillas 65', 75'; Challe 67'

Estadio Nou Camp, León
Attendance: 13,537
Referee: Tofiq Bahramov (Soviet Union)

11 June 1970
16:00

Bulgaria	1–1	Morocco
Zhechev 40'		Ghazouani 61'

Estadio Nou Camp, León
Attendance: 12,299
Referee: Antonio Ribeiro Saldanha (Portugal)

=== 1986 FIFA World Cup ===
==== Group Stage ====
Pos	Team	Pld	W	D	L	GF	GA	GD	Pts	Qualification
1	Morocco	3	1	2	0	3	1	+2	4	Advance to knockout stage
2	England	3	1	1	1	3	1	+2	3	Advance to knockout stage
3	Poland	3	1	1	1	1	3	−2	3	Advance to knockout stage
4	Portugal	3	1	0	2	2	4	−2	2	

Source: FIFA
2 June 1986
16:00 CST

Morocco	0–0	Poland

Estadio Universitario, San Nicolás de los Garza
Attendance: 19,900
Referee: José Luis Martínez Bazán (Uruguay)

6 June 1986
16:00 CST

England	0–0	Morocco

Estadio Tecnológico, Monterrey
Attendance: 20,200
Referee: Gabriel González (Paraguay)

11 June 1986
16:00 CST

Portugal	1–3	Morocco
Diamantino 80'		Khairi 19', 27'; A. Merry 62'

Estadio Tres de Marzo, Zapopan
Attendance: 28,000
Referee: Alan Snoddy (Northern Ireland)

==== Knockout stage ====
Round of 16

17 June 1986
16:00 CST

Morocco	0–1	West Germany
		Matthäus 88'

Estadio Universitario, San Nicolás de los Garza
Attendance: 19,800
Referee: Zoran Petrović (Yugoslavia)

=== 1994 FIFA World Cup ===
==== Group Stage ====
Pos	Team	Pld	W	D	L	GF	GA	GD	Pts	Qualification
1	Netherlands	3	2	0	1	4	3	+1	6 (Note: Head-to-head result: Netherlands 2–1 Saudi Arabia.)	Advance to knockout stage
2	Saudi Arabia	3	2	0	1	4	3	+1	6	Advance to knockout stage
3	Belgium	3	2	0	1	2	1	+1	6	Advance to knockout stage
4	Morocco	3	0	0	3	2	5	−3	0	

Source: FIFA
Notes:
June 19, 1994
12:30 p.m. EDT

Belgium	1–0	Morocco
Degryse 11'

Citrus Bowl, Orlando
Attendance: 61,219
Referee: José Torres Cadena (Colombia)

June 25, 1994
12:30 p.m. EDT

Saudi Arabia	2–1	Morocco
Al-Jaber 7' (pen.); Anwar 45'		Chaouch 26'

Giants Stadium, East Rutherford
Attendance: 76,322
Referee: Philip Don (England)

June 29, 1994
12:30 p.m. EDT

Morocco	1–2	Netherlands
Nader 47'		Bergkamp 43'; Roy 77'

Citrus Bowl, Orlando
Attendance: 60,578
Referee: Alberto Tejada Noriega (Peru)

=== 1998 FIFA World Cup ===
==== Group Stage ====
Pos	Team	Pld	W	D	L	GF	GA	GD	Pts	Qualification
1	Brazil	3	2	0	1	6	3	+3	6	Advance to knockout stage
2	Norway	3	1	2	0	5	4	+1	5	Advance to knockout stage
3	Morocco	3	1	1	1	5	5	0	4	
4	Scotland	3	0	1	2	2	6	−4	1	

Source: FIFA
10 June 1998
21:00 CEST (UTC+2)

Morocco	2–2	Norway
Hadji 37'; Hadda 60'		Chippo 45+1' (o.g.); Eggen 61'

Stade de la Mosson, Montpellier
Attendance: 29,800
Referee: Pirom Un-Prasert (Thailand)

16 June 1998
21:00 CEST (UTC+2)

Brazil	3–0	Morocco
Ronaldo 9'; Rivaldo 45+2'; Bebeto 50'

Stade de la Beaujoire, Nantes
Attendance: 35,500
Referee: Nikolai Levnikov (Russia)

23 June 1998
21:00 CEST (UTC+2)

Scotland	0–3	Morocco
		Bassir 23', 85'; Hadda 46'

Stade Geoffroy-Guichard, Saint-Étienne
Attendance: 30,600
Referee: Ali Bujsaim (United Arab Emirates)

=== 2018 FIFA World Cup ===
==== Group Stage ====
Pos	Team	Pld	W	D	L	GF	GA	GD	Pts	Qualification
1	Spain	3	1	2	0	6	5	+1	5	Advance to knockout stage
2	Portugal	3	1	2	0	5	4	+1	5	Advance to knockout stage
3	Iran	3	1	1	1	2	2	0	4	
4	Morocco	3	0	1	2	2	4	−2	1	

Source: FIFA
15 June 2018
18:00 MSK (UTC+3)

Morocco	0–1	Iran
		Bouhaddouz 90+5' (o.g.)

Krestovsky Stadium, Saint Petersburg
Attendance: 62,548
Referee: Cüneyt Çakır (Turkey)

20 June 2018
15:00 MSK (UTC+3)

Portugal	1–0	Morocco
Ronaldo 4'

Luzhniki Stadium, Moscow
Attendance: 78,011
Referee: Mark Geiger (United States)

25 June 2018
20:00 KALT (UTC+2)

Spain	2–2	Morocco
Isco 19'; Aspas 90+1'		Boutaïb 14'; En-Nesyri 81'

Kaliningrad Stadium, Kaliningrad
Attendance: 33,973
Referee: Ravshan Irmatov (Uzbekistan)

=== 2022 FIFA World Cup ===
==== Group Stage ====
Pos	Team	Pld	W	D	L	GF	GA	GD	Pts	Qualification
1	Morocco	3	2	1	0	4	1	+3	7	Advanced to knockout stage
2	Croatia	3	1	2	0	4	1	+3	5	Advanced to knockout stage
3	Belgium	3	1	1	1	1	2	−1	4	
4	Canada	3	0	0	3	2	7	−5	0	

Source: FIFA
Rules for classification: Group stage tiebreakers
23 November 2022
13:00

Morocco	0–0	Croatia

Al Bayt Stadium, Al Khor
Attendance: 59,407
Referee: Fernando Rapallini (Argentina)

27 November 2022
16:00

Belgium	0–2	Morocco
		Saïss 73'; Aboukhlal 90+2'

Al Thumama Stadium, Doha
Attendance: 43,738
Referee: César Arturo Ramos (Mexico)

1 December 2022
18:00

Canada	1–2	Morocco
Aguerd 40' (o.g.)		Ziyech 4'; En-Nesyri 23'

Al Thumama Stadium, Doha
Attendance: 43,102
Referee: Raphael Claus (Brazil)

==== Knockout stage ====
Round of 16

6 December 2022
18:00

Morocco	0–0 (a.e.t.)	Spain
Penalties
Sabiri (penalty scored); Ziyech (penalty scored); Benoun (penalty missed); Hakimi (penalty scored)	3–0	(penalty missed) Sarabia; (penalty missed) Soler; (penalty missed) Busquets

Education City Stadium, Al Rayyan
Attendance: 44,667
Referee: Fernando Rapallini (Argentina)

Quarter-finals

10 December 2022
18:00

Morocco	1–0	Portugal
En-Nesyri 42'

Al Thumama Stadium, Doha
Attendance: 44,198
Referee: Facundo Tello (Argentina)

Semi-finals

14 December 2022
22:00

France	2–0	Morocco
T. Hernandez 5'; Kolo Muani 79'

Al Bayt Stadium, Al Khor
Attendance: 68,294
Referee: César Arturo Ramos (Mexico)

Match for third place

17 December 2022
18:00

Croatia	2–1	Morocco
Gvardiol 7'; Oršić 42'		Dari 9'

Khalifa International Stadium, Al Rayyan
Attendance: 44,137
Referee: Abdulrahman Al-Jassim (Qatar)

=== 2026 FIFA World Cup ===
==== Group Stage ====
Pos	Team	Pld	W	D	L	GF	GA	GD	Pts	Qualification
1	Brazil	3	2	1	0	7	1	+6	7 (Note: Tied on head-to-head result (Brazil 1–1 Morocco). Overall goal difference was used as the tiebreaker.)	Advance to knockout stage
2	Morocco	3	2	1	0	6	3	+3	7	Advance to knockout stage
3	Scotland	3	1	0	2	1	4	−3	3	
4	Haiti	3	0	0	3	2	8	−6	0	

Source: FIFA
Rules for classification: Group stage tiebreakers
Notes:
June 13, 2026
6:00 p.m. UTC−4

Brazil	1–1	Morocco
Vinícius 32'	(Note: "Brazil vs Morocco | First Stage | FIFA World Cup 2026". FIFA. Retrieved June 13, 2026.; "Match Report – Group C – Brazil v. Morocco". FIFA. June 14, 2026. Retrieved June 14, 2026.; "Post match summary report – Group C – Brazil v. Morocco". FIFA. June 14, 2026. Retrieved June 14, 2026.)	Saibari 21'

MetLife Stadium, East Rutherford
Attendance: 80,663
Referee: Slavko Vinčić (Slovenia)

June 19, 2026
6:00 p.m. UTC−4

Scotland	0–1	Morocco
	(Note: "Scotland vs Morocco | First Stage | FIFA World Cup 2026". FIFA. Retrieved June 19, 2026.; "Match Report – Group C – Scotland v. Morocco". FIFA. June 20, 2026. Retrieved June 20, 2026.; "Post match summary report – Group C – Scotland v. Morocco". FIFA. June 19, 2026. Retrieved June 20, 2026.)	Saibari 2'

Gillette Stadium, Foxborough
Attendance: 64,146
Referee: Ilgiz Tantashev (Uzbekistan)

June 24, 2026
6:00 p.m. UTC−4

Morocco	4–2	Haiti
Hakimi 39'; Saibari 45+1'; Rahimi 78'; Yassine 89'	(Note: "Morocco vs Haiti | First Stage | FIFA World Cup 2026". FIFA. Retrieved June 25, 2026.; "Match Report – Group C – Morocco v. Haiti". FIFA. June 25, 2026. Retrieved June 25, 2026.; "Post match summary report – Group C – Morocco v. Haiti". FIFA. June 25, 2026. Retrieved June 25, 2026.)	Bounou 10' (o.g.); Isidor 43'

Mercedes-Benz Stadium, Atlanta
Attendance: 68,239
Referee: Danny Makkelie (Netherlands)

==== Knockout stage ====
Round of 32

June 29, 2026
7:00 p.m. UTC−6

Netherlands	1–1 (a.e.t.)	Morocco
Gakpo 72'	(Note: "Netherlands vs Morocco | Round of 32 | FIFA World Cup 2026". FIFA. Retrieved June 30, 2026.; "Match Report – Round of 32 – Netherlands v. Morocco". FIFA. June 30, 2026. Retrieved June 30, 2026.; "Post match summary report – Round of 32 – Netherlands v. Morocco". FIFA. June 30, 2026. Retrieved June 30, 2026.)	Diop 90+1'
Penalties
Koopmeiners (penalty scored); Kluivert (penalty missed); Weghorst (penalty scored); Timber (penalty missed); Summerville (penalty missed)	2–3	(penalty missed) El Aynaoui; (penalty scored) Rahimi; (penalty scored) Talbi; (penalty missed) Hakimi; (penalty scored) Saibari

Estadio BBVA, Guadalupe
Attendance: 51,243
Referee: Wilton Sampaio (Brazil)

Round of 16

July 4, 2026
12:00 p.m. UTC−5

Canada	0–3	Morocco
	(Note: "Canada vs Morocco | Round of 16 | FIFA World Cup 2026". FIFA. Retrieved July 4, 2026.; "Match Report – Round of 16 – Canada v. Morocco". FIFA. July 4, 2026. Retrieved July 4, 2026.; "Post match summary report – Round of 16 – Canada v. Morocco". FIFA. July 4, 2026. Retrieved July 6, 2026.)	Ounahi 50', 82'; Rahimi 90+8'

NRG Stadium, Houston
Attendance: 68,777
Referee: Michael Oliver (England)

Quarter-finals

July 9, 2026
4:00 p.m. UTC−4

France	2–0	Morocco
Mbappé 60'; Dembélé 66'	(Note: "France vs Morocco | Quarter-final | FIFA World Cup 2026". FIFA. Retrieved July 9, 2026.; "Match Report – Quarter-final – France v. Morocco". FIFA. July 9, 2026. Retrieved July 9, 2026.; "Post match summary report – Quarter-final – France v. Morocco". FIFA. July 9, 2026. Retrieved July 10, 2026.)

Gillette Stadium, Foxborough
Attendance: 63,811
Referee: Facundo Tello (Argentina)

== Head-to-head record ==
Opponent	Pld	W	D	L	GF	GA	GD	Win %
Belgium	2	1	0	1	2	1	+1	50.00
Brazil	2	0	1	1	1	4	−3	0.00
Bulgaria	1	0	1	0	1	1	+0	0.00
Canada	2	2	0	0	5	1	+4	100.00
Croatia	2	0	1	1	1	2	−1	0.00
England	1	0	1	0	0	0	+0	0.00
France	2	0	0	2	0	4	−4	0.00
Germany	2	0	0	2	1	3	−2	0.00
Haiti	1	1	0	0	4	2	+2	100.00
Iran	1	0	0	1	0	1	−1	0.00
Netherlands	2	0	1	1	2	3	−1	0.00
Norway	1	0	1	0	2	2	+0	0.00
Peru	1	0	0	1	0	3	−3	0.00
Poland	1	0	1	0	0	0	+0	0.00
Portugal	3	2	0	1	4	2	+2	66.67
Saudi Arabia	1	0	0	1	1	2	−1	0.00
Scotland	2	2	0	0	4	0	+4	100.00
Spain	2	0	2	0	2	2	+0	0.00
Total	28	8	9	11	30	31	−1	28.57

== Player records ==
Correct as of 9 July 2026, after the match against France.

=== Most appearances ===
Rank	Player	Matches	World Cups
1	Achraf Hakimi	16	2018, 2022 and 2026
2	Azzedine Ounahi	13	2022 and 2026
3	Yassine Bounou	12	2018, 2022 and 2026
4	Sofyan Amrabat	11	2018, 2022 and 2026
4	Noussair Mazraoui	11	2022 and 2026
6	Hakim Ziyech	10	2018 and 2022
7	Youssef En-Nesyri	8	2018 and 2022
7	Romain Saïss	8	2018 and 2022
9	Selim Amallah	7	2022
9	Sofiane Boufal	7	2022
9	Bilal El Khannouss	7	2022 and 2026

=== Goalscorers ===
On 3 June 1970, Houmane Jarir made history by scoring Morocco's first-ever FIFA World Cup goal, coming in the 21st minute of their opening match against West Germany in León.

Player	Goals	1970	1986	1994	1998	2018	2022	2026
Youssef En-Nesyri	3					1	2	
Ismael Saibari	3							3
Abderrazak Khairi	2		2					
Salaheddine Bassir	2				2			
Abdeljalil Hadda	2				2			
Azzedine Ounahi	2							2
Soufiane Rahimi	2							2
Houmane Jarir	1	1						
Maouhoub Ghazouani	1	1						
Abdelkrim Merry	1		1					
Mohammed Chaouch	1			1				
Hassan Nader	1			1				
Mustapha Hadji	1				1			
Khalid Boutaïb	1					1		
Achraf Dari	1						1	
Zakaria Aboukhlal	1						1	
Hakim Ziyech	1						1	
Abdelhamid Sabiri	1						1	
Achraf Hakimi	1							1
Gessime Yassine	1							1
Issa Diop	1							1
Total	30	2	3	2	5	2	6	10

== Historical performances ==
The Morocco team had many records during its participations in the world cup.

- 1970: First African country to draw a match at the World Cup Finals, with 1–1 draw with Bulgaria.
- 1986: First African and Arab team to reach round of 16.
- 1986: First African and Arab team to top the group stage.
- 1998: Youssef Chippo of Morocco. first African to score an own goal at the World Cup, in the 2–2 draw against Norway on 10 June 1998.
- 2018: Sofyan Amrabat of Morocco, who came on as a substitute for his brother Nordin Amrabat in the 76th minute in the group match against Iran, is the first player in World Cup history to come in for his brother.
- 2022: First African team to reach 7 points at the group stage.
- 2022: First Arab nation to advance to the quarter-finals by defeating Spain 3–0 in a penalty shoot-out.
- 2022: Morocco becomes first African and first Arab nation to reach semi-finals following a 1–0 victory over Portugal.
- 2022: Walid Regragui of Morocco, first African and Arab manager to reach the quarter-finals and the semi-finals.
- 2022: First African team to play seven matches in one edition.
- 2022: First African team to achieve fourth place in the tournament.
- 2026: First African team to reach the quarter-finals twice.
- 2030: The second African (after South Africa), Arab (after Qatar) and first North African country to host the FIFA World Cup.

== Records ==
- Most wins by an African nation: 8 wins
- Most matches played by an African nation: 29 matches
- Most goals scored by an African nation: 30 goals

=== Team Records ===
- Most appearances: Achraf Hakimi (16 Appearances)
- Most goals scored : Youssef En-Nesyri & Ismael Saibari (3 Goals)
- Most assists: Brahim Díaz (4 assists)

== See also ==
- African nations at the FIFA World Cup
- Morocco at the Africa Cup of Nations
