= Rafael Risco =

Peruvian footballer (born 1950)

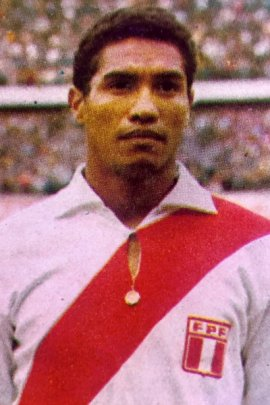

Personal information
- Full name: Luis Rafael Esteban Risco Alván
- Date of birth: 26 December 1945 (age 80)
- Place of birth: Rímac District, Lima, Peru
- Date of death: 15 February 2021 (aged 75)
- Place of death: San Luis District, Lima, Peru
- Position: Defender

Senior career*
Years	Team	Apps	(Gls)
1963–1964	Atlético Lusitania		
1965–1966	Deportivo Municipal		
1967–1968	Defensor Lima		
1969	Defensor Arica		
1970–1974	Alianza Lima		
1975	The Strongest		

International career
1969–1972	Peru	8	(0)
- * Club domestic league appearances and goals

Luis Rafael Esteban Risco Alván (26 December 1945 – 15 February 2021) was a Peruvian former footballer who played as a defender. Nicknamed "Calidad", he was known for playing for Alianza Lima in the early 1970s as well as representing his home country during the 1970 FIFA World Cup qualifiers.

== Club career ==
He would make his club debut within Atlético Lusitania at only 18 years of age for the 1963 and the 1964 seasons. In 1965, he would play for Deportivo Municipal where he would play for two seasons until 1966. He was then transferred to play for Defensor Lima for both the 1967 and 1968 seasons. Risco briefly played for Defensor Arica where he would be part of the roster to reach runners-up for the 1969 Torneo Descentralizado and direct qualification for the 1970 Copa Libertadores although Risco would only play for one season. Beginning in 1970, he would play for Alianza Lima where he would be part of the runner up squad for the 1971 Torneo Descentralizado as well as participate in the 1972 Copa Libertadores. He was described as one of the club's best midfielders throughout his time within the club until his final season in the 1974 Torneo Descentralizado.

== International career ==
Risco played in the Peru national football team eight times with his debut occurring on 17 August 1969 in a match against Bolivia during the 1970 FIFA World Cup qualifiers. He would also play in the decisive match against Argentina at La Bombonera where it would end 2–2 for the Peruvians, eliminating Argentina from qualifying for the 1970 FIFA World Cup. His final match would occur on 9 August 1972 in a friendly against Mexico. During his tenure with the team, he would play alongside players such as Roberto Chale, Héctor Chumpitaz, Teófilo Cubillas, Oswaldo Ramírez and Pedro Pablo León. Risco would play his final season with Bolivian club The Strongest for the 1975 Bolivian Primera División before his retirement by the end of the season.

== Personal life ==
Rafael was born on 26 December 1945 at the Barrios Altos neighborhood of the Rímac District as the father of Rafael Risco Ramos who played for Sporting Tabaco in the 1940s. His brother Tadeo Risco was also a professional football player as he would later play for Sporting Cristal from 1970 to 1972. He would die on 15 February 2021, the same day of the 120th anniversary of his former club Alianza Lima. The Peruvian Football Federation confirm his passing and offered their condolences to his passing.
