= Jalili Fadili =

Moroccan football defender

Personal information
- Date of birth: 1 February 1941 (age 85)
- Place of birth: Mohammedia, Morocco
- Position: Defender

Senior career*
Years	Team	Apps	(Gls)
1957–1959	SCC Mohammédia		
1962–1972	FAR Rabat		

International career
1963–1972	Morocco		
- * Club domestic league appearances and goals

Jalili Fadili (born 1941) is a Moroccan football defender who played for Morocco in the 1970 FIFA World Cup. He also played for SCC Mohammédia and FAR Rabat.
