= Moulay Khanousi =

Moroccan footballer

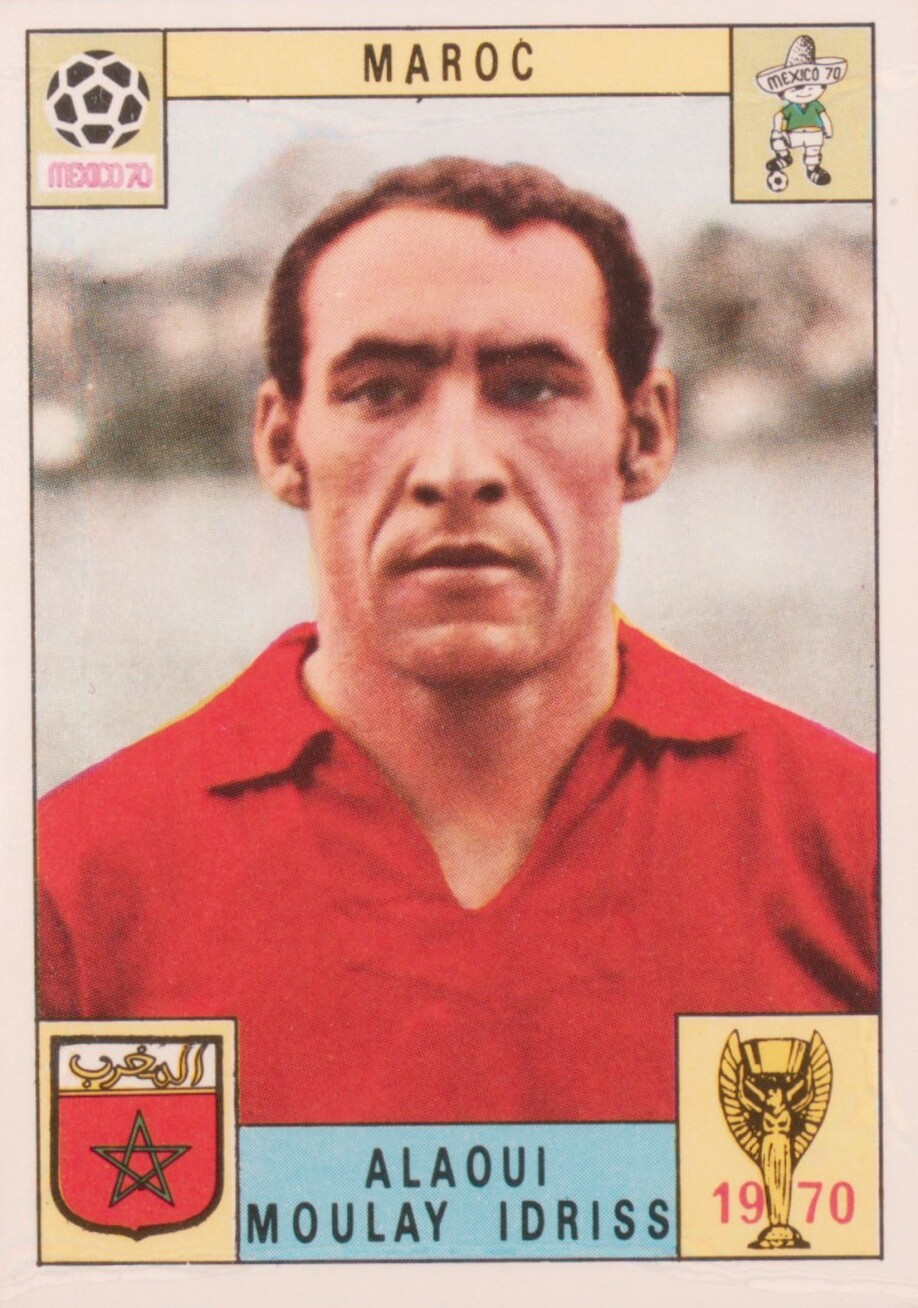
- Khanousi at the 1970 FIFA World Cup

Personal information
- Full name: Moulay Idriss Khanousi
- Date of birth: 1939 (age 86–87)
- Place of birth: Morocco
- Position: Defender

Senior career*
Years	Team	Apps	(Gls)
- Maghreb de Fès

International career
1963–1970	Morocco		
- * Club domestic league appearances and goals

Moulay Idriss Khanousi (Arabic: مولاي إدريس الخنوسي; born 1939) is a Moroccan football defender who played for the Morocco in the 1970 FIFA World Cup. He also played for MAS Fez. Also, Khanousi was a nurse.
