= Ahmed Alaoui =

Moroccan football forward

Personal information
- Date of birth: 1949 (age 76–77)
- Place of birth: Morocco
- Position: Forward

Senior career*
Years	Team	Apps	(Gls)
- RS Settat

International career
- Morocco
- * Club domestic league appearances and goals

Ahmed Alaoui (born 1949) is a Moroccan football forward who played for Morocco in the 1970 FIFA World Cup. He also played for RS Settat.

For the Moroccan independence activist and Minister of Information and Tourism, see Moulay Ahmed Alaoui.
