= Mohamed Maaroufi =

Moroccan footballer (1949–2025)

Mohammed Maaroufi
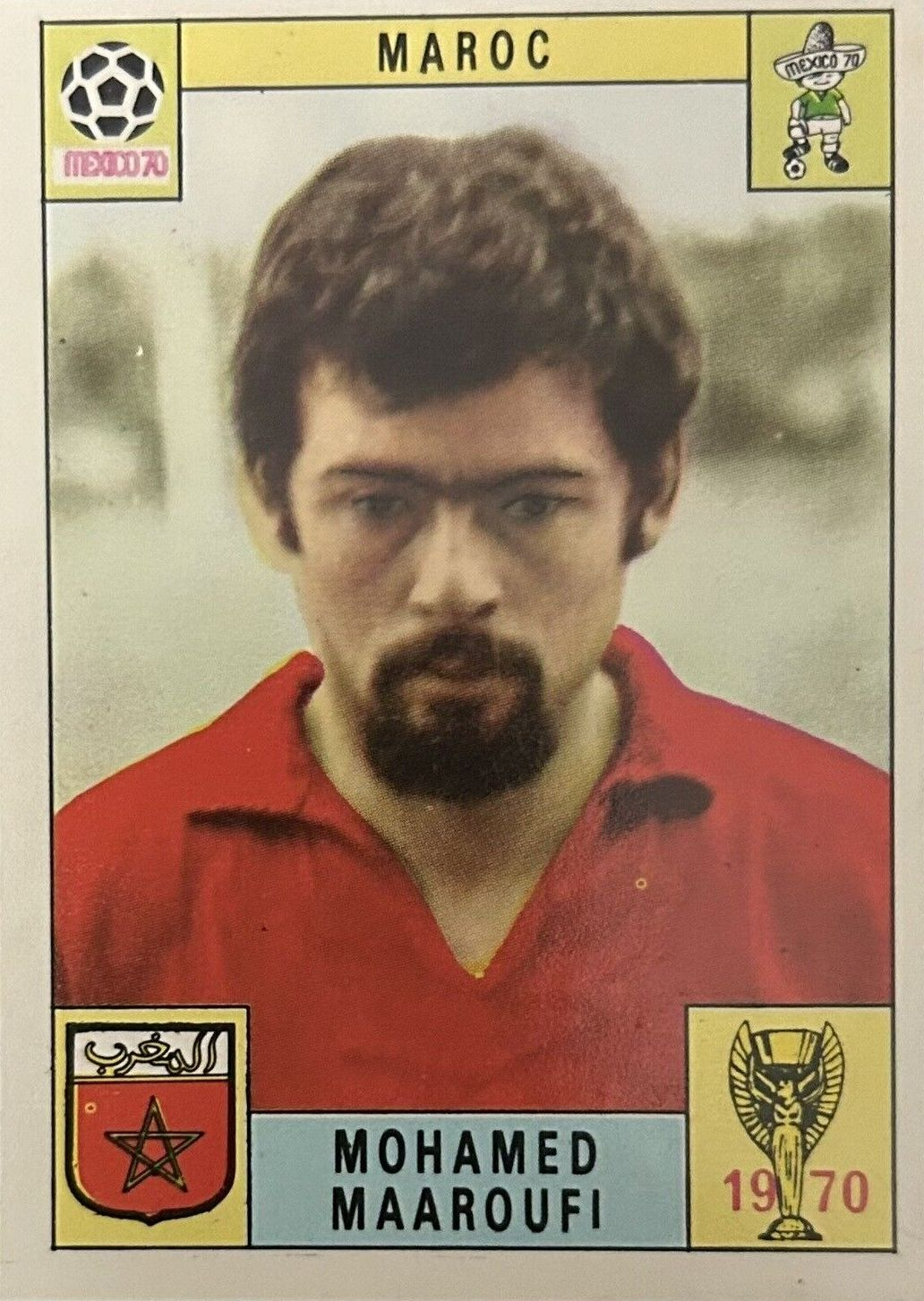
- Maaroufi at the 1970 FIFA World Cup

Personal information
- Date of birth: 1 May 1949
- Place of birth: Morocco
- Date of death: 18 November 2025 (aged 76)
- Height: 1.77 m (5 ft 10 in)
- Position: Midfielder

Youth career
- 1960–1965: Raja CA

Senior career*
Years	Team	Apps	(Gls)
1965–1966	Raja CA		
1966–1971	Difaa El Jadida		
1971–1972	Nîmes	6	(0)
1972–1974	Wydad AC		

International career
1967–1974	Morocco		
- * Club domestic league appearances and goals

Mohammed Maaroufi (Arabic: محمد المعروفي; 1 May 1949 – 18 November 2025) was a Moroccan footballer who played as a midfielder. He represented the Morocco national team in the 1970 FIFA World Cup and the 1972 African Cup of Nations. He also played for Raja CA and Difaâ Hassani El Jadidi. Maaroufi died on 18 November 2025, at the age of 76.
