= Abdelkader El Khiati =

Moroccan footballer (born 1945)

Abdelkader khayati
Personal information
- Date of birth: 1945
- Place of birth: Morocco
- Position: Defender

Senior career*
Years	Team	Apps	(Gls)
- FAR Rabat

International career
- Morocco
- * Club domestic league appearances and goals

Abdelkader Khayati , also spelled El-Khiati (born 1945, date of death unknown) was a Moroccan football defender who played for Morocco in the 1970 FIFA World Cup. He also played for FAR Rabat. El Khiati is deceased.
