= Simeon Simeonov (footballer, born 1946) =

Bulgarian footballer (1946–2000)

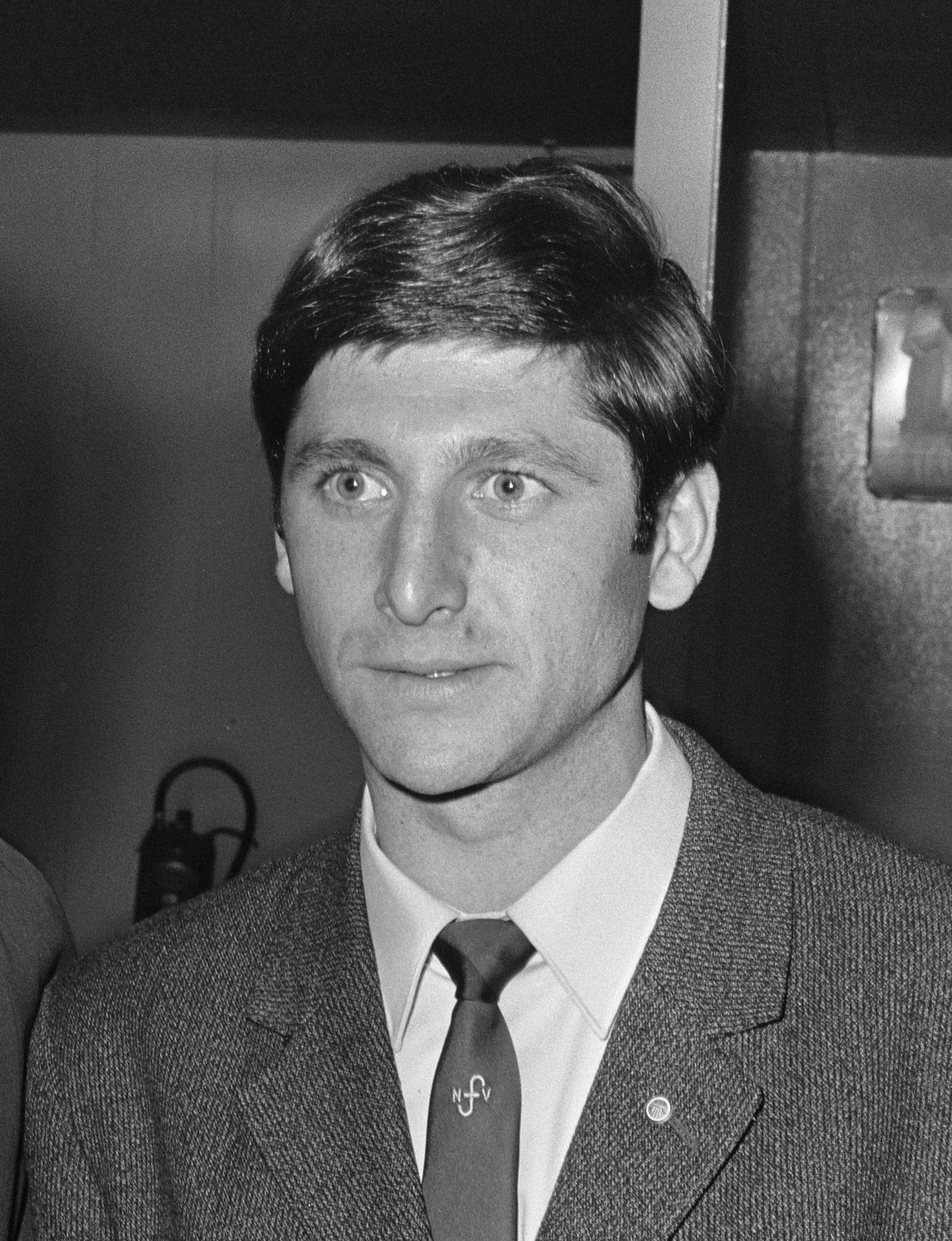
- Simeon Simeonov in 1969

Personal information
- Full name: Simeon Ivanov Simeonov
- Date of birth: 26 March 1946
- Place of birth: Sofia, Bulgaria
- Date of death: 2 November 2000 (aged 54)
- Place of death: Sofia, Bulgaria
- Position: Goalkeeper

Senior career*
Years	Team	Apps	(Gls)
1964–1973	PFC Slavia Sofia	175	(0)
1974	CSKA Sofia	9	(0)
Total		184	(0)

International career
1964–1974	Bulgaria	34	(0)
- * Club domestic league appearances and goals

Simeon Ivanov Simeonov (Bulgarian: Симеон Иванов Симеонов; 26 March 1946 – 2 November 2000) was a Bulgarian football (soccer) goalkeeper.

He played mostly for PFC Slavia Sofia, and for the Bulgaria national football team. He participated at three editions of FIFA World Cup in 1966, 1970 and 1974. He gained 34 caps for Bulgaria.

In December 1968, Simeonov put in a brilliant display, making many saves to earn his nation an impressive 1-1 draw with world champions England at Wembley Stadium.
