= Riyadh Mohammed Asfahani =

Syrian footballer (born 1952)

Personal information
- Date of birth: 13 March 1952 (age 74)

International career
Years	Team	Apps	(Gls)
- Syria

Riyadh Mohammed Asfahani (born 13 March 1952) is a Syrian footballer. He competed in the men's tournament at the 1980 Summer Olympics.
