= Laurens van Ravens =

Dutch football referee (1922–2018)

Lau van Ravens
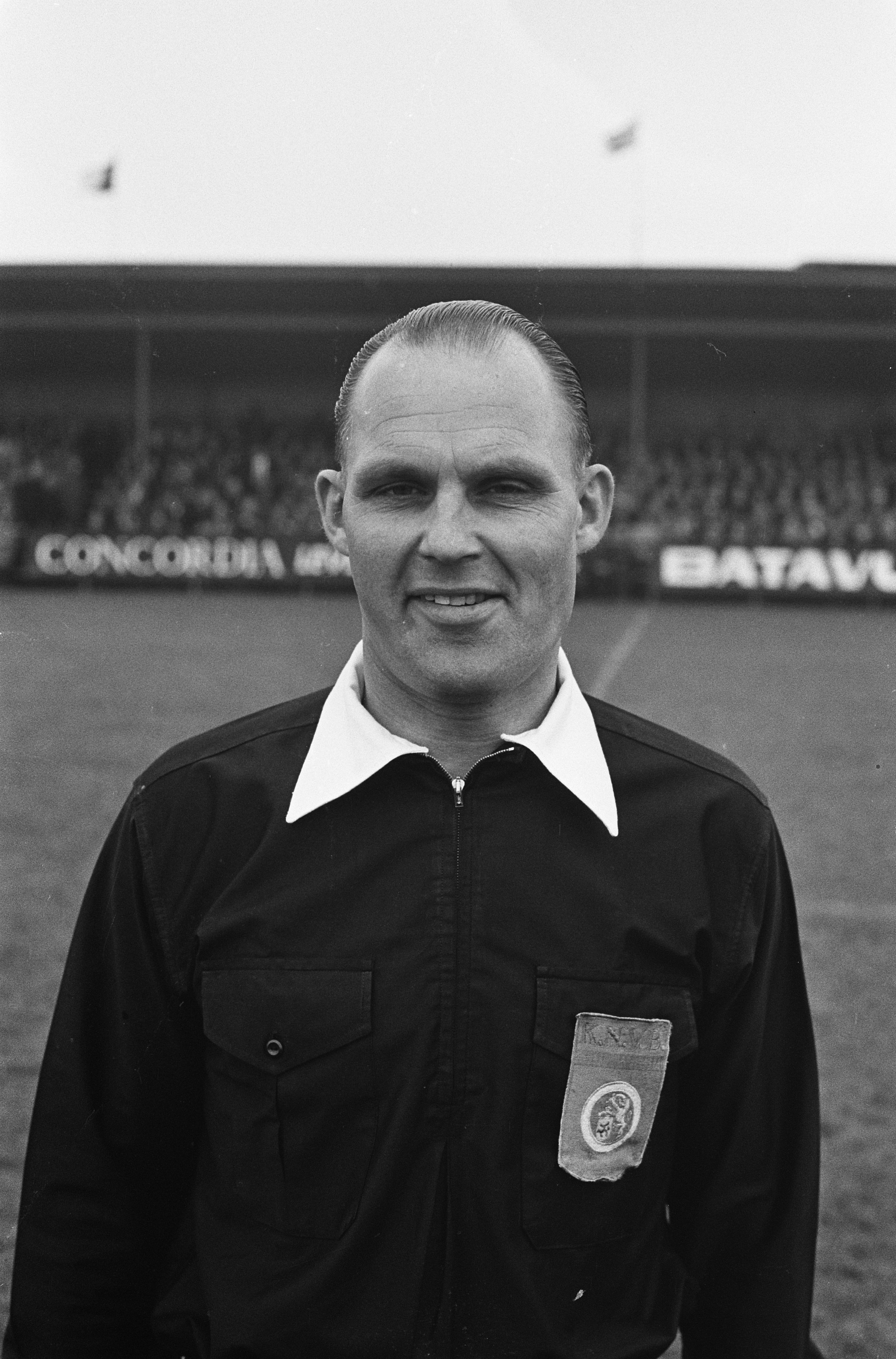
- Full name: Laurens van Ravens
- Born: 18 September 1922; Schiedam, Netherlands
- Died: 23 October 2018 (aged 96); Rijswijk, Netherlands
- Other occupation: Beer salesman

Domestic
Years	League	
1957–1972	Eredivisie	

International
Years	League	Role
1966–1970	FIFA listed	Referee

Laurens "Lau" van Ravens (18 September 1922 – 23 October 2018) was a Dutch international football referee, who featured at the 1970 FIFA World Cup. He officiated in the 1950s, 1960s and 1970s, becoming an international referee in 1966.

He was in charge of the November 1971 European Cup Winners' Cup second leg of the second round match between Glasgow Rangers and Sporting Lisbon. The game originally finished 3–2 to Sporting after 90 minutes, and 4–3 to Sporting after extra time. Although Rangers had won the first leg 3–2 at home, van Ravens erroneously ordered a penalty shootout which Sporting won 2–0; UEFA later ruled that Rangers had won on away goals.

== Major matches ==
Van Ravens refereed two European Cup Finals, the 1969 European Cup Winners' Cup Final between Slovan Bratislava and FC Barcelona in Basel, and the second leg of the 1972 UEFA Cup Final between Wolverhampton Wanderers and Tottenham Hotspur.

He was also in charge of the 1967 and 1971 KNVB Cup finals and both finalists of the 1971 final requested van Ravens to also lead the replay after he was in charge of the first match which ended 2–2.

At the 1970 World Cup, van Ravens officiated the first round match between West Germany and Morocco as well as the quarter-final match between the Soviet Union and Uruguay.

He started the second half of the former match not realizing that the Moroccan goalkeeper had not yet entered the pitch, and in the latter he allowed Uruguay's winning goal to stand, when some people thought the ball had gone out of play seconds earlier.

His final game was Coen Moulijn's farewell match between Feyenoord and Uruguay on 9 June 1972.

== Personal life ==
Van Ravens worked as a salesman for the Oranjeboom brewing company and was married twice. He had two children. He died in Rijswijk, Netherlands, aged 96.

Preceded by Cup Winners' Cup Final 1968 (Spain) José María Ortiz de Mendíbil	European Cup Referees; Final 1969 (Netherlands) Laurens van Ravens	Succeeded by Cup Winners' Cup Final 1970 (Austria) Paul Schiller
