= Luis Rubiños =

Peruvian footballer (born 1940)

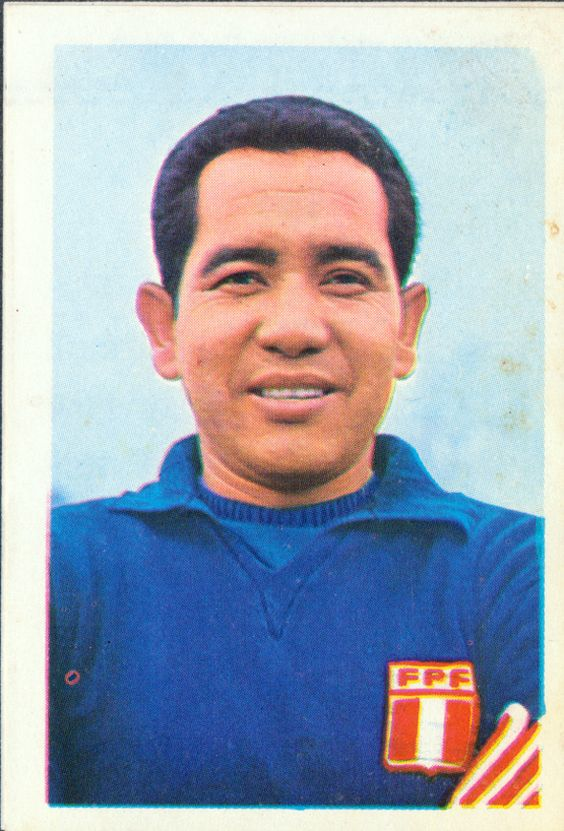
- Rubiños in 1970

Personal information
- Full name: Luis Rubiños Cerna
- Date of birth: December 31, 1940 (age 85)
- Place of birth: Trujillo, Peru
- Height: 1.80 m (5 ft 11 in)
- Position: Goalkeeper

Senior career*
Years	Team	Apps	(Gls)
1961–1962	Sporting Cristal		
1963	Defensor Lima		
1964–1973	Sporting Cristal		
1974	Universitario		
1975–1976	Carlos Mannucci		
1977	Universitario		

International career
1963–1972	Peru	38	(0)
- * Club domestic league appearances and goals

Luis Rubiños Cerna (born December 31, 1940) is a former Peruvian football goalkeeper, who played for the Peru national team between 1963 and 1972, gaining 38 caps. He was part of the Peru squad for the 1970 World Cup. At club level, Rubiños spent most of his career at Sporting Cristal.
