= Javier González (footballer, born 1939) =

Peruvian footballer (1939–2018)

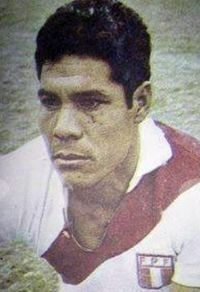
- González in 1970

Personal information
- Full name: José Javier González Alponte
- Date of birth: May 11, 1939
- Place of birth: Peru
- Date of death: April 11, 2018 (aged 78)
- Position: Midfielder

Senior career*
Years	Team	Apps	(Gls)
- Sport Boys Association
- Alianza Lima

International career
- Peru
- * Club domestic league appearances and goals

José Javier González Alponte (May 11, 1939 – April 11, 2018) was a Peruvian football midfielder who played for Peru in the 1970 FIFA World Cup. He also played for Sport Boys and Alianza Lima.

Gonzalez died on April 11, 2018, at the age of 78.
