= Abdallah Lamrani =

Moroccan footballer (1946–2019)

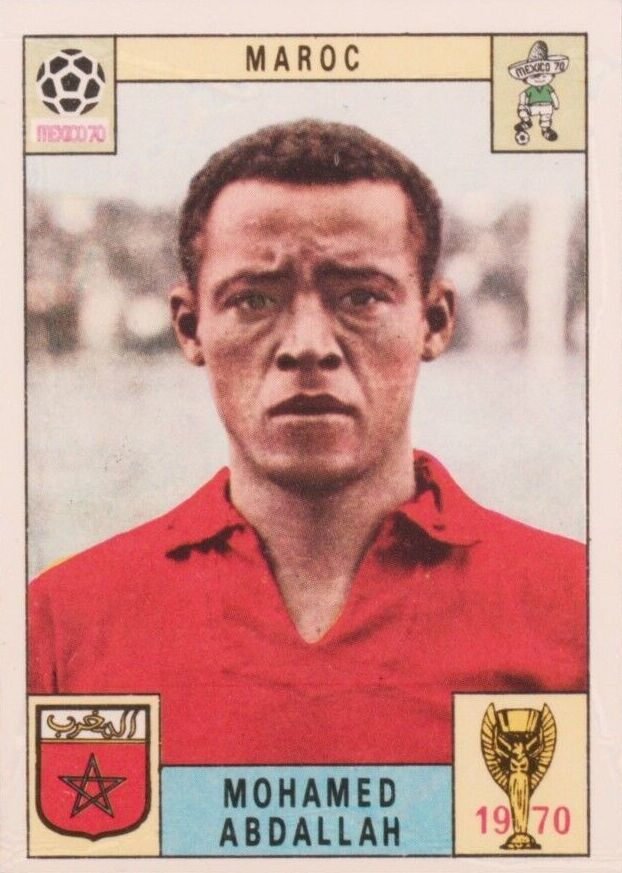
- Lamrani at the 1970 FIFA World Cup

Personal information
- Full name: Abdallah Lamrani
- Date of birth: 1946
- Date of death: 14 April 2019 (aged 72–73)
- Position: Defender

Senior career*
| Years | Team | Apps | (Gls) |
- FAR Rabat

International career
| 1964-1972 | Morocco | 44 | (0) |
- * Club domestic league appearances and goals

Abdallah Lamrani (1946 – 14 April 2019) was a Moroccan footballer who played as a defender. At club level, he played for FAR Rabat. He also played for the Morocco at international level, representing his country at the 1970 FIFA World Cup. Lamrani was a sergeant of the Moroccan Army.
