= Luis Cruzado =

Peruvian footballer and manager (1941-2013)

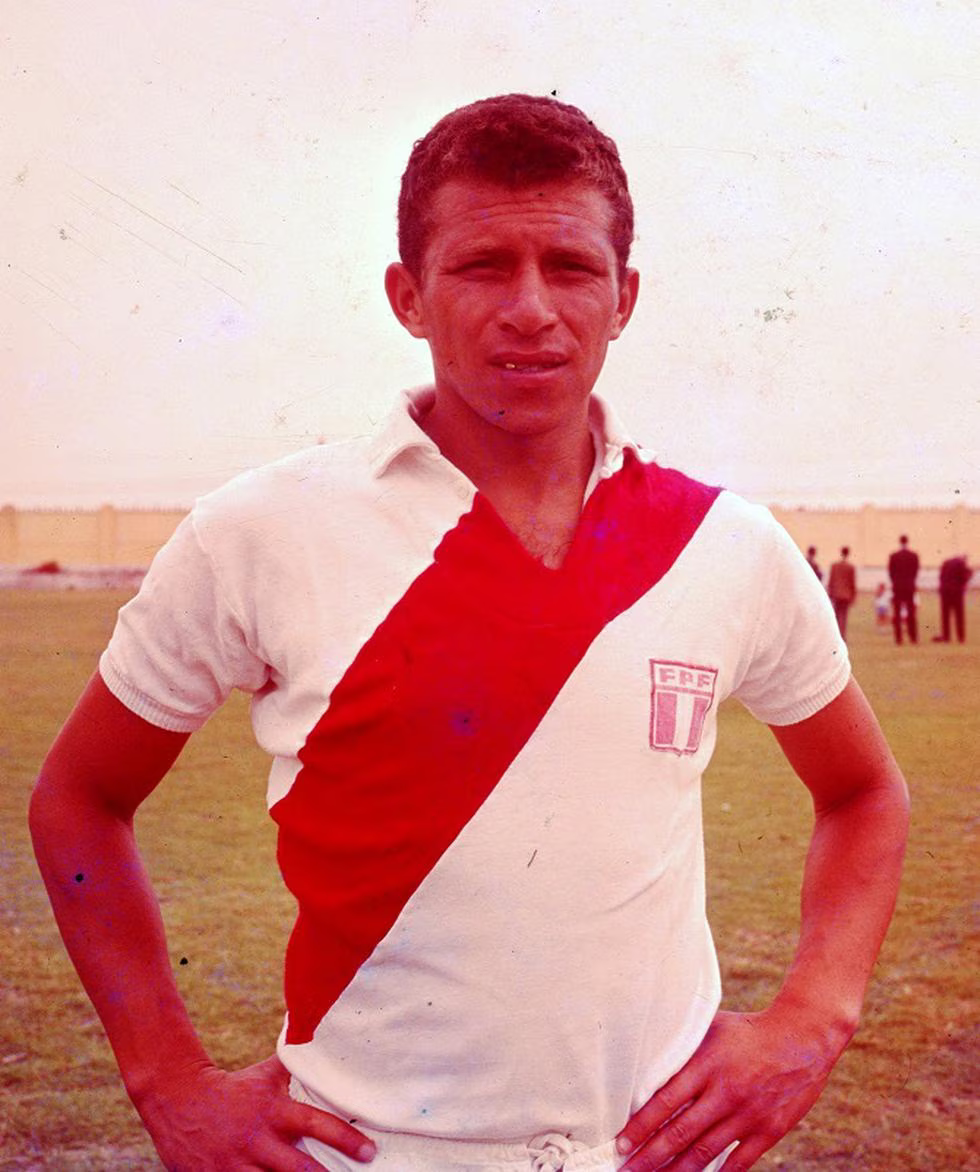

Personal information
- Full name: Luis Fernando Cruzado Sánchez
- Date of birth: 6 July 1941
- Place of birth: Lima, Lima Province, Peru
- Date of death: 14 February 2013 (aged 71)
- Place of death: Lima, Peru
- Height: 1.70 m (5 ft 7 in)
- Position: Midfielder

Senior career*
Years	Team	Apps	(Gls)
1959–1973	Universitario		
1974	Walter Ormeño		
1975	Juan Aurich		

International career
1961–1971	Peru	26	(1)

Managerial career
- 1984: Carlos A. Mannucci
- 1986: Peru
- 1987: San Agustín
- 1988: Juventud La Joya
- 1989: Carlos A. Mannucci
- 2003: Peru (women)
- * Club domestic league appearances and goals

Luis Fernando Cruzado Sánchez (6 July 1941 – 14 February 2013) was a Peruvian footballer who played as a midfielder for Peru in the 1970 FIFA World Cup.

== Club career ==
Cruzado started his career in 1959 with Universitario de Deportes and played his final season with Juan Aurich.

== Managerial career ==
Cruzado managed the Peru women's national football team at the 2003 South American Championship.

== Death ==
He died at the age of 71 on the 14 February 2013 in a Lima, Peru hospital. He was survived by his 3 children. He was widower of Margarita Navarrete, mother of his son and two daughters.
