= Kacem Slimani =

Moroccan footballer (1948–1996)

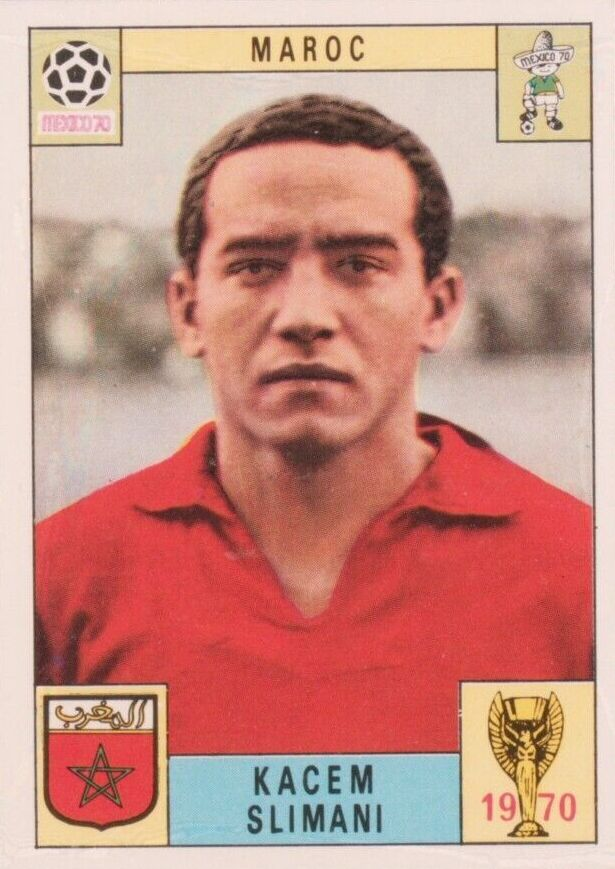
- Slimani at the 1970 FIFA World Cup

Personal information
- Date of birth: 1 July 1948
- Place of birth: Morocco
- Date of death: 30 November 1996 (aged 48)
- Height: 1.75 m (5 ft 9 in)
- Position: Defender

Senior career*
Years	Team	Apps	(Gls)
1967-1972	RS Settat		
1972–1973	Paris FC		
1973–1975	RS Settat		
1975–1977	US Nœux-les-Mines		

International career
- Morocco
- * Club domestic league appearances and goals

Kacem Slimani (Moroccan Arabic: قاسم سليماني, romanized: Qāsim Sulaymānī; 1 July 1948 – 30 November 1996) was a Moroccan football defender who played for Morocco in the 1970 FIFA World Cup. He also played for RS Settat and Paris FC. Also, Slimani was a municipal employee.
