= Nicolás Fuentes =

Peruvian footballer (1941–2015)

Nicolas Fuentes
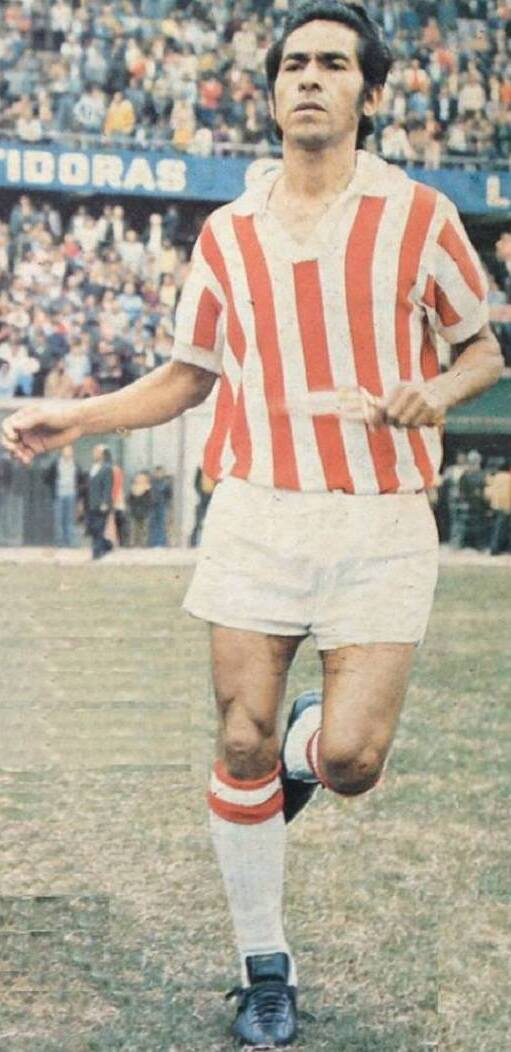
- Fuentes in 1973

Personal information
- Full name: Domingo Nicolás Fuentes Zegarra
- Date of birth: 20 December 1941
- Place of birth: Mollendo, Peru
- Date of death: 28 October 2015 (aged 73)
- Height: 1.68 m (5 ft 6 in)
- Position: Left-back

Senior career*
Years	Team	Apps	(Gls)
1961–1963	Atlético Chalaco		
1964–1970	Universitario		
1971–1972	Defensor Lima		
1973	Atlético Chalaco		
1974	Sporting Cristal		

International career
1965–1970	Peru	17	(0)
- * Club domestic league appearances and goals

Domingo Nicolás Fuentes Zegarra (20 December 1941 – 28 October 2015) was a Peruvian footballer who played as a left-back.

== Early life ==
Domingo Nicolás Fuentes Zegarra was born in Mollendo, Peru.

== Career ==
Fuentes played for Atlético Chalaco, Universitario de Deportes, Defensor Lima and Sporting Cristal. With Universitario he won the Peruvian Primera División in 1964, 1966, 1967, and 1969.

He made 17 appearances for the Peru national team from 1965 to 1971, including playing at the 1970 FIFA World Cup.

== Death ==
Fuentes died on 28 October 2015 at the age of 73 due to lung disease.

== Honours ==
Universitario

- Peruvian Primera División: 1964, 1966, 1967, 1969
