= Pedro González (Peruvian footballer) =

Peruvian footballer (born 1943)

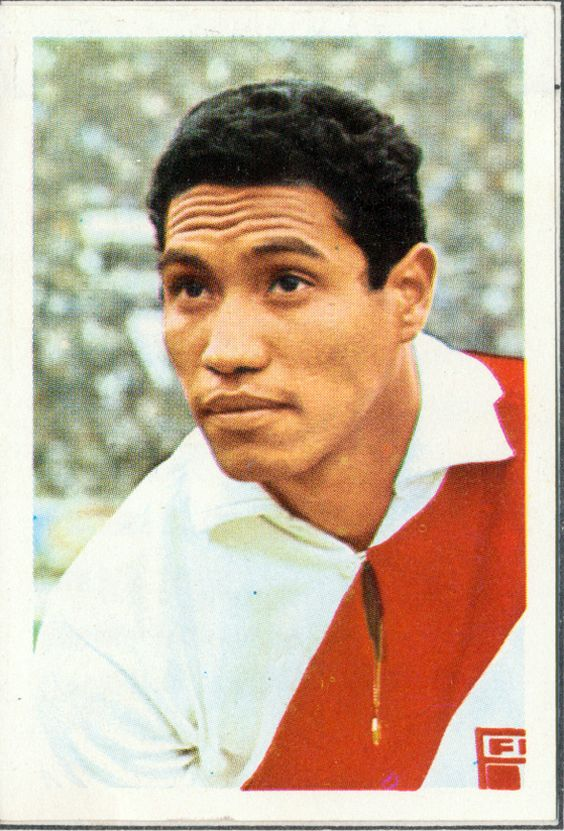

Personal information
- Full name: Pedro González Zavala
- Date of birth: 19 May 1943 (age 83)
- Place of birth: Peru
- Position: Midfielder

Senior career*
Years	Team	Apps	(Gls)
- Universitario

International career
- Peru
- * Club domestic league appearances and goals

Pedro González Zavala (born 19 May 1943) is a Peruvian football midfielder who played for Peru in the 1970 FIFA World Cup. He also played for Universitario de Deportes.
