= Boujemaa Benkhrif =

Moroccan footballer

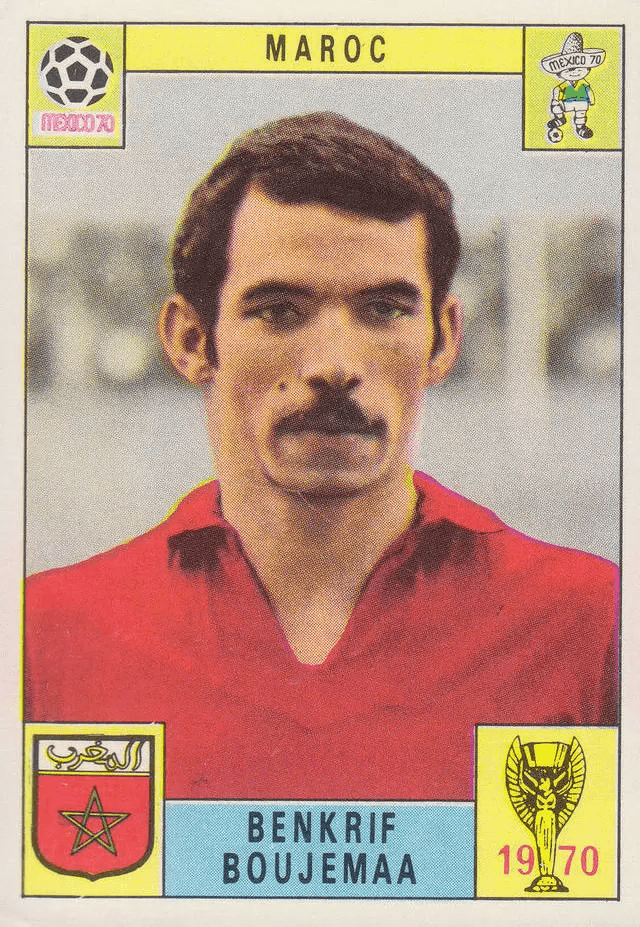
- Benkhrif at the 1970 FIFA World Cup

Personal information
- Full name: Boujemaa Benkhrif
- Date of birth: 1947 (age 78–79)
- Place of birth: Morocco
- Height: 1.75 m (5 ft 9 in)
- Position: Defender

Senior career*
Years	Team	Apps	(Gls)
1965-1981	KAC Kenitra		

International career
1967-1974	Morocco	68	(4)
- * Club domestic league appearances and goals

Boujemaa Benkhrif (Arabic: بوجمعة بنخريف; born 1947) is a Moroccan former footballer who played as a defender for the Morocco national team in the 1970 FIFA World Cup. He also played for KAC Kenitra. Also, Benkhrif was a risk technician.
