= Orlando de la Torre =

Peruvian footballer (1943–2022)

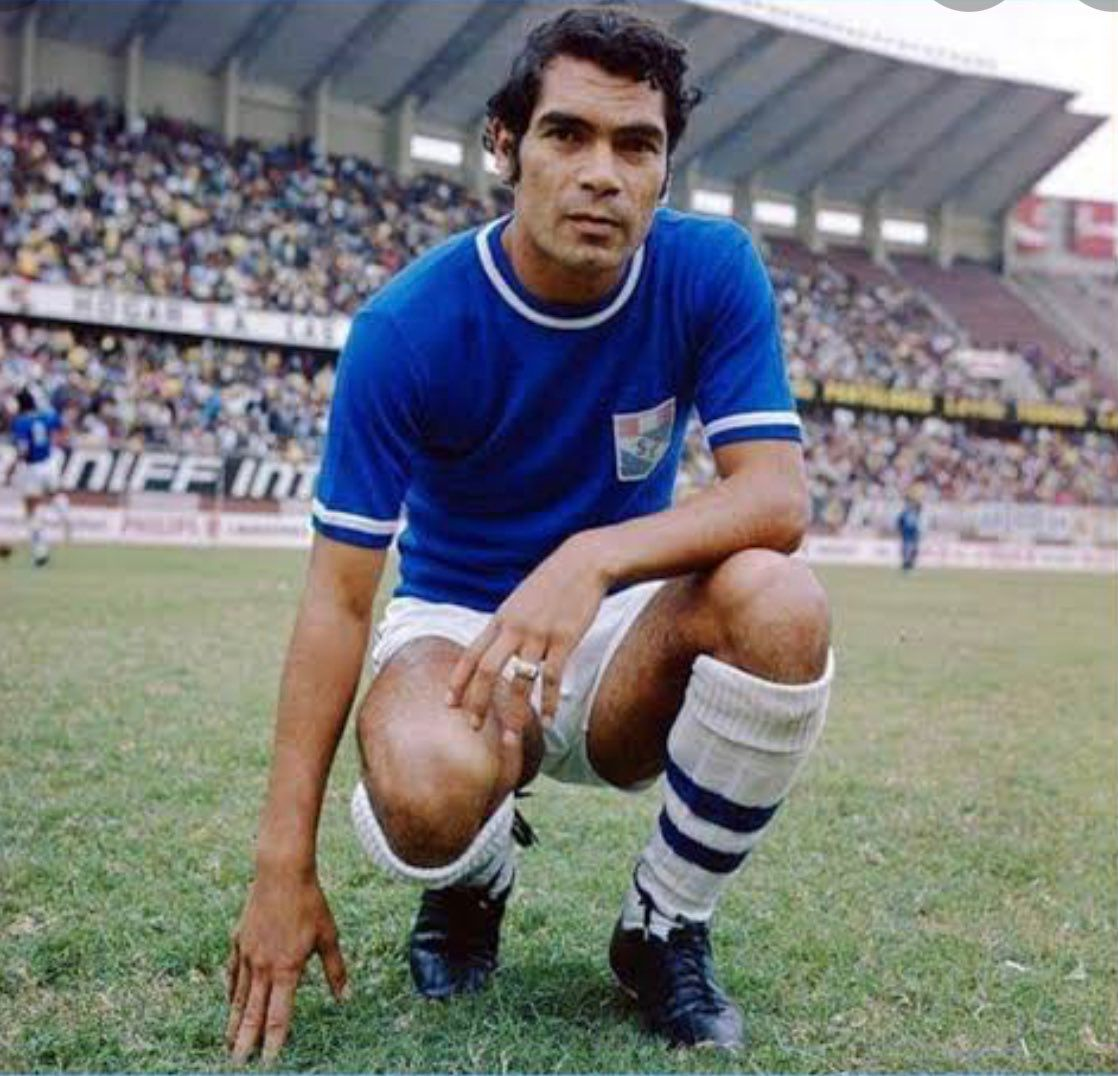
- De la Torre playing for Sporting Cristal

Personal information
- Full name: Orlando de la Torre Castro
- Date of birth: 21 November 1943
- Place of birth: Trujillo, Department of La Libertad, Peru
- Date of death: 24 August 2022 (aged 78)
- Height: 1.80 m (5 ft 11 in)
- Position: Defender

Senior career*
Years	Team	Apps	(Gls)
1960–1973	Sporting Cristal		

International career
1967–1973	Peru	39	(0)
- * Club domestic league appearances and goals

Orlando de la Torre Castro (21 November 1943 – 24 August 2022) was a Peruvian footballer who played as a defender and football coach.

== Club career ==
De la Torre began his club career by playing for Sporting Cristal at the age of 17 as a central defender, going on to win the Peruvian Primera División in 1968, 1970 and 1972.

== International career ==
De la Torre played for the Peru national team between 1967 and 1973, gaining 39 caps. He was part of the Peru squad for the 1970 World Cup.
