= Allal Benkassou =

Moroccan footballer (1941–2013)

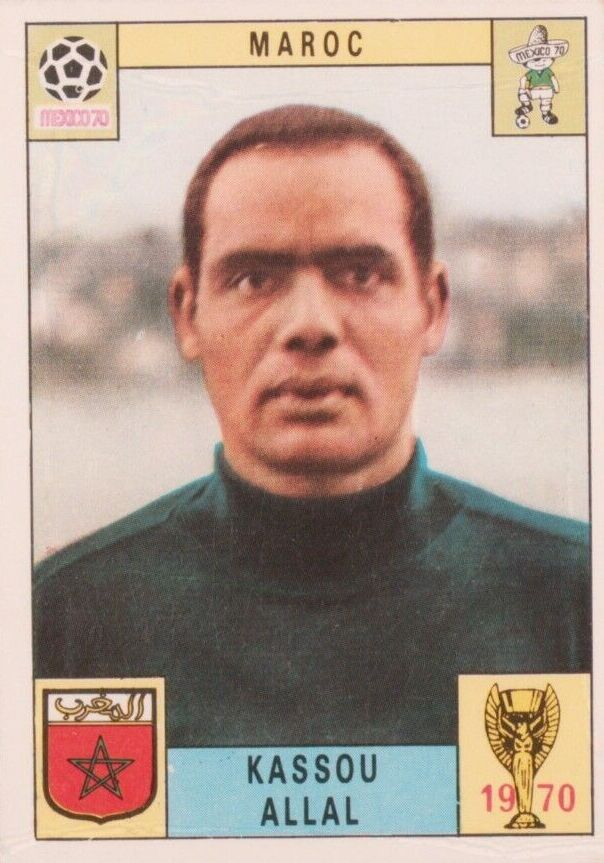
- Benkassou at the 1970 FIFA World Cup

Personal information
- Date of birth: 30 November 1941
- Place of birth: Rabat, Morocco
- Date of death: 29 October 2013 (aged 71)
- Height: 1.78 m (5 ft 10 in)
- Position: Goalkeeper

Senior career*
Years	Team	Apps	(Gls)
1960–1976	FAR Rabat		

International career
1963–1972	Morocco	52	(0)
- * Club domestic league appearances and goals

Allal Benkassou, also spelled Ben Kassou (Arabic: علال بن قصو; 11 November 1941 – 29 October 2013 in Rabat) was a Moroccan footballer who played as a goalkeeper.

Benkassou played club football for FAR Rabat.

Benkassou played for the Morocco national team at the 1964 Summer Olympics where he played against Yugoslavia and Hungary and at the 1970 FIFA World Cup finals where he played against West Germany and Peru. He was an unused squad member at the 1972 Summer Olympics. He played 116 times for the Morocco football team.

In 2006, he was selected by CAF as one of the best 200 African football players of the last 50 years.

Benkassou was also a sergeant of the Moroccan Army.
