= Maouhoub Ghazouani =

Moroccan footballer (born 1946)

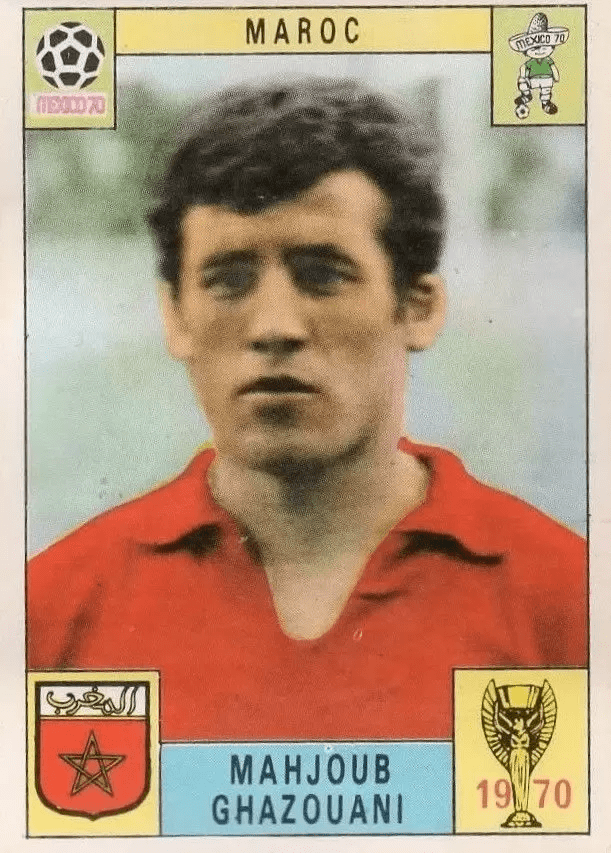
- Ghazouani at the 1970 FIFA World Cup

Personal information
- Date of birth: 1946 (age 79–80)
- Place of birth: Hay Mohammadi-Casablanca; Morocco
- Position: Midfielder

Senior career*
Years	Team	Apps	(Gls)
- FAR Rabat

International career
1969-1974	Morocco	30	(4)
- * Club domestic league appearances and goals

Maouhoub Ghazouani (born 1946) is a former Moroccan football midfielder who played for Morocco in the 1970 FIFA World Cup. He scored a goal versus Bulgaria in a 1-1 draw. Morocco, therefore, became the first African team to avoid defeat in the World Cup. He also played for AS FAR.
