= Roberto Chale =

Peruvian footballer and manager (1946–2024)

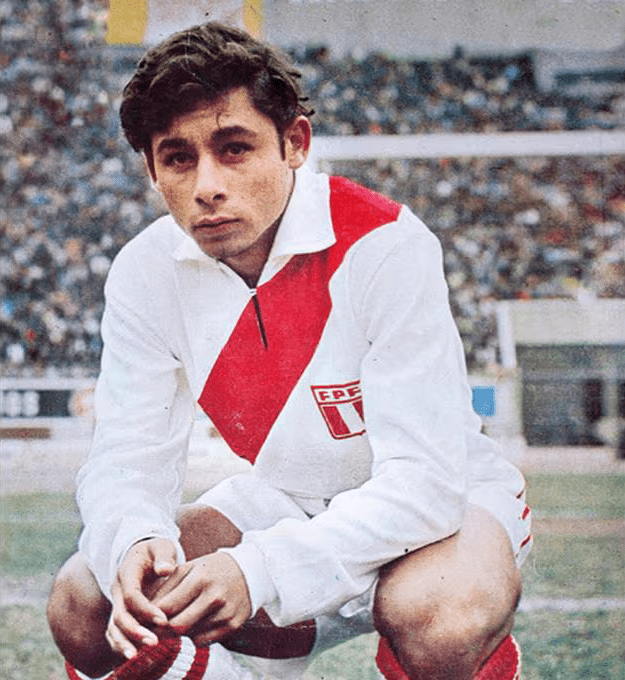
- Chale in 1969

Personal information
- Full name: Roberto Carlos Chale Olarte
- Date of birth: 24 November 1946
- Place of birth: Lima, Peru
- Date of death: 10 September 2024 (aged 77)
- Place of death: Lima, Peru
- Height: 1.78 m (5 ft 10 in)
- Position: Midfielder

Senior career*
Years	Team	Apps	(Gls)
1964–1965	Centro Iqueño		
1966–1971	Universitario		
1972–1974	Defensor Lima		
1974–1975	Sport Boys		
1976	Sporting Cristal		
1977	Universitario		
1978	Universidad Catolica		
1979	Deportivo Municipal		
1980	Universitario		

International career
1967–1973	Peru	48	(4)

Managerial career
- 1975: Defensor Lima
- 1981: CNI
- 1981: Juan Aurich
- 1983: Deportivo Junín
- 1983–1984: Atlético Chalaco
- 1985: San Agustín
- 1985: Peru
- 1987: San Agustín
- 1989: Defensor Lima
- 1989–1990: San Agustín
- 1991: Defensor Lima
- 1992: UTC
- 1992: León de Huánuco
- 1993: Sport Boys
- 1994: Deportivo Municipal
- 1995: Deportivo Sipesa
- 1996: San Agustín
- 1996: Deportivo Pesquero
- 1997: La Loretana
- 1999–2001: Universitario
- 2002: Sport Coopsol
- 2003: Deportivo Municipal
- 2005: Alianza Lima
- 2009: Universidad San Marcos
- 2010: Atlético Torino
- 2011: U América FC
- 2015–2017: Universitario
- * Club domestic league appearances and goals

Roberto Carlos Chale Olarte (24 November 1946 – 10 September 2024) was a Peruvian footballer, recognized as one of Peru's most important midfielders.

He is also known as Maestro (Master) or Niño Terrible (Enfant terrible), Chale is best remembered for his performance in the 1970 World Cup qualifying match against Argentina on 30 August 1969, which sent Peru to the finals.

He earned 48 caps and scored 4 goals for the Peru national team, and played in the 1970 FIFA World Cup, where he scored one goal against Morocco and Peru reached the quarterfinals.

== Early life ==
Chale was born in Lima on 24 November 1946.

== Playing career ==
Chale's debut in the Peruvian First Division was in 1965 at Centro Iqueño. He later played for Universitario de Deportes where he became three times Peruvian champion in 1966, 1967 and 1969. He also plays at Defensor Lima with whom he won the league one more time in 1973, Sport Boys and Sporting Cristal.

Outside of Peru, he played in Universidad Católica of Ecuador before his retirement with Universitario in 1980.

== Coaching career ==
As a manager Chale coached Juan Aurich, CNI, Atlético Chalaco and Deportivo Junín during the early 1980s.

Chale enjoyed a stint as coach of Peru during the qualifiers for the 1986 World Cup, keeping Peruvian hopes alive until the last game against future World Cup winners Argentina in Buenos Aires ended in a 2–2 draw.

Later he managed San Agustín, Defensor Lima, Sport Boys, Deportivo Municipal, Deportivo Pesquero, Sport Coopsol, Universitario, with whom he won the Peruvian leagues of 1999 and 2000, as well as Alianza Lima.

== Death ==
Chale died in Lima on 10 September 2024, at the age of 77.

== Honours ==
=== Player ===
Universitario

- Peruvian Primera División (3): 1966, 1967, 1969

Defensor Lima

- Peruvian Primera División: 1973

=== Manager ===
Universitario

- Peruvian Primera División (2): 1999, 2000

Defensor Lima

- Peruvian Segunda División : 1988
