= 1994 FIFA World Cup squads =

Below are the squads for the 1994 FIFA World Cup final tournament in the United States. Greece, Italy, Saudi Arabia and Spain were the only countries who had all their players selected from domestic clubs, while the Republic of Ireland and Nigeria had no players from domestic clubs. Saudi Arabia were the only team with no players from European clubs.

The players' age, caps and clubs are as of June 16, 1994 (the tournament started on June 17). A flag is included for coaches who are of a different nationality to their team.

== Group A ==
=== Colombia ===
Head coach: Francisco Maturana

No.	Pos.	Player	Date of birth (age)	Caps	Club
1	GK	Óscar Córdoba	February 3, 1970 (aged 24)	26	(Colombia) América de Cali
2	DF	Andrés Escobar	March 13, 1967 (aged 27)	48	(Colombia) Atlético Nacional
3	DF	Alexis Mendoza	November 8, 1961 (aged 32)	37	(Colombia) Atlético Junior
4	DF	Luis Herrera	June 12, 1962 (aged 32)	56	(Colombia) Atlético Nacional
5	MF	Hermán Gaviria	November 27, 1969 (aged 24)	5	(Colombia) Atlético Nacional
6	MF	Gabriel Gómez	December 8, 1959 (aged 34)	44	(Colombia) Atlético Nacional
7	FW	Antony de Ávila	December 21, 1962 (aged 31)	23	(Colombia) América de Cali
8	MF	Harold Lozano	March 30, 1972 (aged 22)	6	(Colombia) América de Cali
9	FW	Iván Valenciano	March 18, 1972 (aged 22)	9	(Colombia) Atlético Junior
10	MF	Carlos Valderrama (captain)	September 2, 1961 (aged 32)	65	(Colombia) Atlético Junior
11	FW	Adolfo Valencia	February 6, 1968 (aged 26)	14	(Germany) Bayern Munich
12	GK	Faryd Mondragón	June 21, 1971 (aged 22)	1	(Argentina) Argentinos Juniors
13	DF	Néstor Ortiz	September 20, 1968 (aged 25)	2	(Colombia) Once Caldas
14	MF	Leonel Álvarez	July 29, 1965 (aged 28)	71	(Colombia) América de Cali
15	DF	Luis Carlos Perea	December 29, 1963 (aged 30)	75	(Colombia) Atlético Junior
16	FW	Víctor Aristizábal	December 9, 1971 (aged 22)	12	(Spain) Valencia
17	MF	Mauricio Serna	January 22, 1968 (aged 26)	7	(Colombia) Atlético Nacional
18	DF	Óscar Cortés	October 19, 1968 (aged 25)	1	(Colombia) Millonarios
19	MF	Freddy Rincón	August 14, 1966 (aged 27)	39	(Brazil) Palmeiras
20	DF	Wilson Pérez	August 6, 1967 (aged 26)	43	(Colombia) América de Cali
21	FW	Faustino Asprilla	November 10, 1969 (aged 24)	8	(Italy) Parma
22	GK	José María Pazo	April 4, 1964 (aged 30)	1	(Colombia) Atlético Junior

=== Romania ===
Head coach: Anghel Iordănescu

No.	Pos.	Player	Date of birth (age)	Caps	Club
1	GK	Florin Prunea	August 8, 1968 (aged 25)	21	(Romania) Dinamo București
2	DF	Dan Petrescu	December 22, 1967 (aged 26)	33	(Italy) Genoa
3	DF	Daniel Prodan	March 23, 1972 (aged 22)	12	(Romania) Steaua București
4	DF	Miodrag Belodedici	May 20, 1964 (aged 30)	32	(Spain) Valencia
5	MF	Ioan Lupescu	December 9, 1968 (aged 25)	30	(Germany) Bayer Leverkusen
6	MF	Gheorghe Popescu	October 9, 1967 (aged 26)	45	(Netherlands) PSV Eindhoven
7	MF	Dorinel Munteanu	June 25, 1968 (aged 25)	28	(Belgium) Cercle Brugge
8	MF	Iulian Chiriță	February 2, 1967 (aged 27)	3	(Romania) Rapid București
9	FW	Florin Răducioiu	March 17, 1970 (aged 24)	25	(Italy) Milan
10	MF	Gheorghe Hagi (captain)	February 5, 1965 (aged 29)	81	(Italy) Brescia
11	FW	Ilie Dumitrescu	January 6, 1969 (aged 25)	38	(Romania) Steaua București
12	GK	Bogdan Stelea	December 5, 1967 (aged 26)	18	(Romania) Rapid București
13	DF	Tibor Selymes	May 14, 1970 (aged 24)	11	(Belgium) Cercle Brugge
14	DF	Gheorghe Mihali	December 9, 1965 (aged 28)	19	(Romania) Dinamo București
15	MF	Basarab Panduru	July 11, 1970 (aged 23)	11	(Romania) Steaua București
16	FW	Ion Vlădoiu	November 5, 1968 (aged 25)	6	(Romania) Rapid București
17	FW	Viorel Moldovan	July 8, 1972 (aged 21)	4	(Romania) Dinamo București
18	MF	Constantin Gâlcă	March 8, 1972 (aged 22)	7	(Romania) Steaua București
19	DF	Corneliu Papură	September 5, 1973 (aged 20)	5	(Romania) Universitatea Craiova
20	MF	Ovidiu Stîngă	December 5, 1972 (aged 21)	9	(Romania) Universitatea Craiova
21	FW	Marian Ivan	June 1, 1969 (aged 25)	3	(Romania) Brașov
22	GK	Ștefan Preda	June 18, 1970 (aged 23)	1	(Romania) Petrolul Ploiești

=== Switzerland ===
Head coach: (England) Roy Hodgson

No.	Pos.	Player	Date of birth (age)	Caps	Club
1	GK	Marco Pascolo	May 9, 1966 (aged 28)	18	(Switzerland) Servette
2	DF	Marc Hottiger	November 7, 1967 (aged 26)	41	(Switzerland) Sion
3	DF	Yvan Quentin	May 2, 1970 (aged 24)	14	(Switzerland) Sion
4	MF	Dominique Herr	October 25, 1965 (aged 28)	39	(Switzerland) Sion
5	DF	Alain Geiger (captain)	November 5, 1960 (aged 33)	94	(Switzerland) Sion
6	MF	Georges Bregy	January 17, 1958 (aged 36)	50	(Switzerland) Young Boys
7	MF	Alain Sutter	January 22, 1968 (aged 26)	46	(Germany) 1. FC Nürnberg
8	DF	Christophe Ohrel	April 7, 1968 (aged 26)	28	(Switzerland) Servette
9	FW	Adrian Knup	July 2, 1968 (aged 25)	34	(Germany) VfB Stuttgart
10	MF	Ciriaco Sforza	March 2, 1970 (aged 24)	23	(Germany) 1. FC Kaiserslautern
11	FW	Stéphane Chapuisat	June 28, 1969 (aged 24)	36	(Germany) Borussia Dortmund
12	GK	Stephan Lehmann	August 15, 1963 (aged 30)	6	(Switzerland) Sion
13	DF	André Egli	May 8, 1958 (aged 36)	79	(Switzerland) Servette
14	FW	Nestor Subiat	April 23, 1966 (aged 28)	7	(Switzerland) Lugano
15	FW	Marco Grassi	August 8, 1968 (aged 25)	9	(Switzerland) Servette
16	MF	Thomas Bickel	October 6, 1963 (aged 30)	41	(Switzerland) Grasshopper
17	MF	Sébastien Fournier	June 27, 1971 (aged 22)	4	(Switzerland) Sion
18	DF	Martin Rueda	January 9, 1963 (aged 31)	5	(Switzerland) Luzern
19	DF	Jürg Studer	September 8, 1966 (aged 27)	5	(Switzerland) Zürich
20	MF	Patrick Sylvestre	September 1, 1968 (aged 25)	9	(Switzerland) Lausanne
21	MF	Thomas Wyss	August 29, 1966 (aged 27)	5	(Switzerland) Aarau
22	GK	Martin Brunner	April 23, 1963 (aged 31)	33	(Switzerland) Grasshopper

=== United States ===
Head coach: (Federal Republic of Yugoslavia) Bora Milutinović

Note: many of the squad were contracted full-time to U.S. Soccer for the 1993–94 season, as the squad played frequent friendlies in preparation for hosting the tournament.

No.	Pos.	Player	Date of birth (age)	Caps	Club
1	GK	Tony Meola (captain)	February 21, 1969 (aged 25)	78	United States Soccer Federation
2	DF	Mike Lapper	August 28, 1970 (aged 23)	41	United States Soccer Federation
3	DF	Mike Burns	September 14, 1970 (aged 23)	23	United States Soccer Federation
4	DF	Cle Kooiman	July 3, 1963 (aged 30)	10	(Mexico) Cruz Azul
5	MF	Thomas Dooley	May 12, 1961 (aged 33)	38	United States Soccer Federation
6	MF	John Harkes	March 8, 1967 (aged 27)	45	(England) Derby County
7	MF	Hugo Pérez	November 8, 1963 (aged 30)	73	(United States) Los Angeles Salsa
8	FW	Earnie Stewart	March 28, 1969 (aged 25)	16	(Netherlands) Willem II
9	MF	Tab Ramos	September 21, 1966 (aged 27)	47	(Spain) Real Betis
10	FW	Roy Wegerle	March 19, 1964 (aged 30)	17	(England) Coventry City
11	FW	Eric Wynalda	June 9, 1969 (aged 25)	52	(Germany) 1. FC Saarbrücken
12	GK	Juergen Sommer	February 27, 1969 (aged 25)	1	(England) Luton Town
13	MF	Cobi Jones	June 16, 1970 (aged 24)	50	United States Soccer Federation
14	FW	Frank Klopas	September 1, 1966 (aged 27)	30	United States Soccer Federation
15	FW	Joe-Max Moore	February 23, 1971 (aged 23)	34	United States Soccer Federation
16	MF	Mike Sorber	May 14, 1971 (aged 23)	39	United States Soccer Federation
17	DF	Marcelo Balboa	August 8, 1967 (aged 26)	88	United States Soccer Federation
18	GK	Brad Friedel	May 18, 1971 (aged 23)	33	United States Soccer Federation
19	MF	Claudio Reyna	July 20, 1973 (aged 20)	23	United States Soccer Federation
20	DF	Paul Caligiuri	March 9, 1964 (aged 30)	86	United States Soccer Federation
21	DF	Fernando Clavijo	January 23, 1956 (aged 38)	58	United States Soccer Federation
22	DF	Alexi Lalas	June 1, 1970 (aged 24)	47	United States Soccer Federation

== Group B ==
=== Brazil ===
Head coach: Carlos Alberto Parreira

No.	Pos.	Player	Date of birth (age)	Caps	Club
1	GK	Cláudio Taffarel	May 8, 1966 (aged 28)	59	(Italy) Reggiana
2	DF	Jorginho	August 17, 1964 (aged 29)	45	(Germany) Bayern Munich
3	DF	Ricardo Rocha	September 11, 1962 (aged 31)	36	(Brazil) Vasco da Gama
4	DF	Ronaldão	June 19, 1965 (aged 28)	7	(Japan) Shimizu S-Pulse
5	MF	Mauro Silva	January 12, 1968 (aged 26)	35	(Spain) Deportivo La Coruña
6	DF	Branco	April 4, 1964 (aged 30)	67	(Brazil) Fluminense
7	FW	Bebeto	February 16, 1964 (aged 30)	53	(Spain) Deportivo La Coruña
8	MF	Dunga (captain)	October 31, 1963 (aged 30)	43	(Germany) VfB Stuttgart
9	MF	Zinho	June 17, 1967 (aged 27)	30	(Brazil) Palmeiras
10	MF	Raí	May 15, 1965 (aged 29)	43	(France) Paris Saint-Germain
11	FW	Romário	January 29, 1966 (aged 28)	31	(Spain) Barcelona
12	GK	Zetti	January 10, 1965 (aged 29)	7	(Brazil) São Paulo
13	DF	Aldair	November 30, 1965 (aged 28)	21	(Italy) Roma
14	DF	Cafu	June 7, 1970 (aged 24)	30	(Brazil) São Paulo
15	DF	Márcio Santos	September 15, 1969 (aged 24)	27	(France) Bordeaux
16	MF	Leonardo	September 5, 1969 (aged 24)	12	(Brazil) São Paulo
17	MF	Mazinho	April 8, 1966 (aged 28)	29	(Brazil) Palmeiras
18	FW	Paulo Sérgio	June 2, 1969 (aged 25)	10	(Germany) Bayer Leverkusen
19	FW	Müller	January 31, 1966 (aged 28)	53	(Brazil) São Paulo
20	FW	Ronaldo	18 September 1976 (aged 17)	3	(Brazil) Cruzeiro
21	FW	Viola	January 1, 1969 (aged 25)	5	(Brazil) Corinthians
22	GK	Gilmar Rinaldi	January 13, 1959 (aged 35)	7	(Brazil) Flamengo

Note: Raí captained Brazil in the group stage, before he was dropped and replaced by Dunga.

=== Cameroon ===
Head coach: (France) Henri Michel

No.	Pos.	Player	Date of birth (age)	Caps	Club
1	GK	Joseph-Antoine Bell	October 8, 1954 (aged 39)	21	(France) Saint-Étienne
2	DF	André Kana-Biyik	September 1, 1965 (aged 28)	41	(France) Le Havre
3	DF	Rigobert Song	July 1, 1976 (aged 17)	3	(Cameroon) Tonnerre Yaoundé
4	DF	Samuel Ekemé	July 12, 1966 (aged 27)	2	(Cameroon) Canon Yaoundé
5	DF	Victor N'Dip	August 18, 1967 (aged 26)	36	(Cameroon) Olympic Mvolyé
6	MF	Thomas Libiih	November 17, 1967 (aged 26)	20	(Saudi Arabia) Ohod
7	FW	François Omam-Biyik	May 21, 1966 (aged 28)	39	(France) Lens
8	MF	Emile M'Bouh	May 30, 1966 (aged 28)	46	Qatar SC
9	FW	Roger Milla	May 20, 1952 (aged 42)	26	(Cameroon) Tonnerre Yaoundé
10	FW	Louis-Paul M'Fédé	February 26, 1961 (aged 33)	42	(Cameroon) Canon Yaoundé
11	MF	Emmanuel Maboang	November 27, 1968 (aged 25)	12	(Portugal) Rio Ave
12	MF	Paul Loga	August 14, 1969 (aged 24)	16	(Cameroon) Prévoyance Yaoundé
13	DF	Raymond Kalla	April 22, 1975 (aged 19)	4	(Cameroon) Canon Yaoundé
14	DF	Stephen Tataw (captain)	March 31, 1963 (aged 31)	46	(Cameroon) Olympic Mvolyé
15	DF	Hans Agbo	September 26, 1967 (aged 26)	18	(Cameroon) Olympic Mvolyé
16	FW	Alphonse Tchami	September 14, 1971 (aged 22)	12	(Denmark) Odense
17	MF	Marc-Vivien Foé	May 1, 1975 (aged 19)	4	(Cameroon) Canon Yaoundé
18	MF	Jean-Pierre Fiala	April 22, 1969 (aged 25)	4	(Cameroon) Canon Yaoundé
19	FW	David Embé	November 13, 1973 (aged 20)	5	(Portugal) Belenenses
20	FW	Georges Mouyémé	April 15, 1971 (aged 23)	5	(France) Troyes
21	GK	Thomas N'Kono	July 20, 1956 (aged 37)	18	(Spain) L'Hospitalet
22	GK	Jacques Songo'o	March 17, 1964 (aged 30)	16	(France) Metz

=== Russia ===
Head coach: Pavel Sadyrin

No.	Pos.	Player	Date of birth (age)	Caps	Club
1	GK	Stanislav Cherchesov	September 2, 1963 (aged 30)	19	(Germany) Dynamo Dresden
2	DF	Dmitri Kuznetsov	August 28, 1965 (aged 28)	26	(Spain) Espanyol
3	DF	Sergei Gorlukovich	November 18, 1961 (aged 32)	32	(Germany) Bayer Uerdingen
4	DF	Dmitri Galiamin	January 8, 1963 (aged 31)	18	(Spain) Espanyol
5	DF	Yuriy Nikiforov	September 16, 1970 (aged 23)	8	(Russia) Spartak Moscow
6	DF	Vladislav Ternavsky	May 2, 1969 (aged 25)	2	(Russia) Spartak Moscow
7	MF	Andrey Pyatnitsky	September 27, 1967 (aged 26)	9	(Russia) Spartak Moscow
8	MF	Dmitri Popov	February 27, 1967 (aged 27)	11	(Spain) Racing Santander
9	FW	Oleg Salenko	October 25, 1969 (aged 24)	5	(Spain) Logroñés
10	MF	Valeri Karpin	February 2, 1969 (aged 25)	10	(Russia) Spartak Moscow
11	FW	Vladimir Beschastnykh	April 1, 1974 (aged 20)	6	(Russia) Spartak Moscow
12	DF	Omari Tetradze	October 13, 1969 (aged 24)	9	(Russia) Dynamo Moscow
13	MF	Aleksandr Borodyuk	November 30, 1962 (aged 31)	13	(Germany) SC Freiburg
14	MF	Igor Korneev	September 4, 1967 (aged 26)	13	(Spain) Espanyol
15	FW	Dmitri Radchenko	December 2, 1970 (aged 23)	14	(Spain) Racing Santander
16	GK	Dmitri Kharine (captain)	August 16, 1968 (aged 25)	22	(England) Chelsea
17	MF	Ilya Tsymbalar	June 17, 1969 (aged 25)	2	(Russia) Spartak Moscow
18	DF	Viktor Onopko	October 14, 1969 (aged 24)	21	(Russia) Spartak Moscow
19	MF	Aleksandr Mostovoi	August 22, 1968 (aged 25)	20	(France) Caen
20	MF	Igor Lediakhov	May 22, 1968 (aged 26)	15	(Russia) Spartak Moscow
21	MF	Dmitri Khlestov	January 21, 1971 (aged 23)	12	(Russia) Spartak Moscow
22	FW	Sergei Yuran	June 11, 1969 (aged 25)	26	(Portugal) Benfica

Note: caps include those for the Soviet Union, CIS, and Russia, while those for other countries, such as Ukraine, are not counted.

=== Sweden ===
Head coach: Tommy Svensson

No.	Pos.	Player	Date of birth (age)	Caps	Club
1	GK	Thomas Ravelli	August 13, 1959 (aged 34)	110	(Sweden) IFK Göteborg
2	DF	Roland Nilsson	November 27, 1963 (aged 30)	62	(England) Sheffield Wednesday
3	DF	Patrik Andersson	August 18, 1971 (aged 22)	23	(Germany) Borussia Mönchengladbach
4	DF	Joachim Björklund	March 15, 1971 (aged 23)	22	(Sweden) IFK Göteborg
5	DF	Roger Ljung	January 8, 1966 (aged 28)	46	(Turkey) Galatasaray
6	MF	Stefan Schwarz	April 18, 1969 (aged 25)	29	(Portugal) Benfica
7	FW	Henrik Larsson	September 20, 1971 (aged 22)	7	(Netherlands) Feyenoord
8	MF	Klas Ingesson	August 20, 1968 (aged 25)	42	(Netherlands) PSV Eindhoven
9	MF	Jonas Thern (captain)	March 20, 1967 (aged 27)	47	(Italy) Napoli
10	FW	Martin Dahlin	April 16, 1968 (aged 26)	29	(Germany) Borussia Mönchengladbach
11	FW	Tomas Brolin	November 29, 1969 (aged 24)	31	(Italy) Parma
12	GK	Lars Eriksson	September 21, 1965 (aged 28)	14	(Sweden) IFK Norrköping
13	DF	Mikael Nilsson	September 28, 1968 (aged 25)	12	(Sweden) IFK Göteborg
14	DF	Pontus Kåmark	April 5, 1969 (aged 25)	12	(Sweden) IFK Göteborg
15	DF	Teddy Lučić	April 15, 1973 (aged 21)	0	(Sweden) Västra Frölunda
16	MF	Anders Limpar	September 24, 1965 (aged 28)	51	(England) Everton
17	MF	Stefan Rehn	September 22, 1966 (aged 27)	38	(Sweden) IFK Göteborg
18	MF	Håkan Mild	June 14, 1971 (aged 23)	12	(Switzerland) Servette
19	FW	Kennet Andersson	October 6, 1967 (aged 26)	24	(France) Lille
20	DF	Magnus Erlingmark	July 8, 1968 (aged 25)	24	(Sweden) IFK Göteborg
21	MF	Jesper Blomqvist	February 5, 1974 (aged 20)	8	(Sweden) IFK Göteborg
22	GK	Magnus Hedman	March 19, 1973 (aged 21)	0	(Sweden) AIK

- Caps as of 10 June 1994

== Group C ==
=== Bolivia ===
Head coach: (Spain) Xabier Azkargorta

No.	Pos.	Player	Date of birth (age)	Caps	Club
1	GK	Carlos Trucco	August 11, 1957 (aged 36)	21	(Bolivia) Bolívar
2	DF	Juan Manuel Peña	January 17, 1973 (aged 21)	21	(Colombia) Santa Fe
3	DF	Marco Sandy	August 29, 1971 (aged 22)	26	(Bolivia) Bolívar
4	DF	Miguel Rimba	November 1, 1967 (aged 26)	35	(Bolivia) Bolívar
5	DF	Gustavo Quinteros	February 15, 1965 (aged 29)	5	(Bolivia) The Strongest
6	MF	Carlos Borja (captain)	December 25, 1956 (aged 37)	76	(Bolivia) Bolívar
7	MF	Mario Pinedo	April 9, 1964 (aged 30)	1	(Bolivia) Oriente Petrolero
8	MF	José Milton Melgar	September 20, 1959 (aged 34)	65	(Chile) Cobreloa
9	FW	Álvaro Peña	February 11, 1965 (aged 29)	11	(Chile) Deportes Temuco
10	MF	Marco Etcheverry	September 26, 1970 (aged 23)	23	(Chile) Colo-Colo
11	FW	Jaime Moreno	January 19, 1974 (aged 20)	23	(Bolivia) Blooming
12	GK	Darío Rojas	January 20, 1960 (aged 34)	4	(Bolivia) Oriente Petrolero
13	DF	Modesto Soruco	February 12, 1966 (aged 28)	3	(Bolivia) Blooming
14	MF	Mauricio Ramos	September 23, 1969 (aged 24)	1	(Bolivia) Guabirá
15	MF	Vladimir Soria	July 15, 1964 (aged 29)	16	(Bolivia) Bolívar
16	DF	Luis Cristaldo	August 31, 1969 (aged 24)	29	(Bolivia) Bolivar
17	DF	Óscar Sánchez	July 16, 1971 (aged 22)	3	(Bolivia) The Strongest
18	FW	William Ramallo	July 4, 1963 (aged 30)	3	(Bolivia) Oriente Petrolero
19	GK	Marcelo Torrico	January 11, 1972 (aged 22)	?	(Bolivia) The Strongest
20	MF	Ramiro Castillo	March 27, 1966 (aged 28)	25	(Argentina) Platense
21	MF	Erwin Sánchez	October 19, 1969 (aged 24)	29	(Portugal) Boavista
22	MF	Julio César Baldivieso	December 2, 1971 (aged 22)	31	(Bolivia) Bolívar

=== Germany ===
Head coach: Berti Vogts

No.	Pos.	Player	Date of birth (age)	Caps	Club
1	GK	Bodo Illgner	April 7, 1967 (aged 27)	49	(Germany) 1. FC Köln
2	MF	Thomas Strunz	April 25, 1968 (aged 26)	13	(Germany) VfB Stuttgart
3	DF	Andreas Brehme	November 9, 1960 (aged 33)	81	(Germany) 1. FC Kaiserslautern
4	DF	Jürgen Kohler	October 6, 1965 (aged 28)	65	(Italy) Juventus
5	DF	Thomas Helmer	April 21, 1965 (aged 29)	25	(Germany) Bayern Munich
6	DF	Guido Buchwald	January 24, 1961 (aged 33)	73	(Germany) VfB Stuttgart
7	MF	Andreas Möller	September 2, 1967 (aged 26)	40	(Italy) Juventus
8	MF	Thomas Häßler	May 30, 1966 (aged 28)	50	(Italy) Roma
9	FW	Karl-Heinz Riedle	September 16, 1965 (aged 28)	39	(Germany) Borussia Dortmund
10	MF	Lothar Matthäus (captain)	March 21, 1961 (aged 33)	112	(Germany) Bayern Munich
11	FW	Stefan Kuntz	October 30, 1962 (aged 31)	4	(Germany) 1. FC Kaiserslautern
12	GK	Andreas Köpke	March 12, 1962 (aged 32)	14	(Germany) 1. FC Nürnberg
13	FW	Rudi Völler	April 13, 1960 (aged 34)	87	(France) Marseille
14	DF	Thomas Berthold	November 12, 1964 (aged 29)	54	(Germany) VfB Stuttgart
15	MF	Maurizio Gaudino	December 12, 1966 (aged 27)	5	(Germany) Eintracht Frankfurt
16	MF	Matthias Sammer	September 5, 1967 (aged 26)	24	(Germany) Borussia Dortmund
17	MF	Martin Wagner	February 24, 1968 (aged 26)	3	(Germany) 1. FC Kaiserslautern
18	FW	Jürgen Klinsmann	July 30, 1964 (aged 29)	60	(France) Monaco
19	FW	Ulf Kirsten	December 4, 1965 (aged 28)	10	(Germany) Bayer Leverkusen
20	MF	Stefan Effenberg	August 2, 1968 (aged 25)	30	(Italy) Fiorentina
21	MF	Mario Basler	December 18, 1968 (aged 25)	5	(Germany) Werder Bremen
22	GK	Oliver Kahn	June 15, 1969 (aged 25)	0	(Germany) Karlsruher SC

Note: Sammer and Kirsten also earned additional caps for East Germany (23 and 49, respectively).

=== South Korea ===
Head coach: Kim Ho

No.	Pos.	Player	Date of birth (age)	Caps	Club
1	GK	Choi In-young (captain)	March 5, 1962 (aged 32)	?	(South Korea) Hyundai Horangi
2	MF	Chung Jong-son	March 20, 1966 (aged 28)	?	(South Korea) Hyundai Horangi
3	DF	Lee Jong-hwa	July 20, 1963 (aged 30)	?	(South Korea) Ilhwa Chunma
4	DF	Kim Pan-keun	March 5, 1966 (aged 28)	?	(South Korea) LG Cheetahs
5	DF	Park Jung-bae	February 19, 1967 (aged 27)	?	(South Korea) Daewoo Royals
6	MF	Lee Young-jin	October 27, 1963 (aged 30)	?	(South Korea) LG Cheetahs
7	DF	Shin Hong-gi	May 4, 1968 (aged 26)	?	(South Korea) Hyundai Horangi
8	MF	Noh Jung-yoon	March 28, 1971 (aged 23)	?	(Japan) Sanfrecce Hiroshima
9	FW	Kim Joo-sung	January 17, 1966 (aged 28)	?	(Germany) VfL Bochum
10	FW	Ko Jeong-woon	June 27, 1966 (aged 27)	?	(South Korea) Ilhwa Chunma
11	FW	Seo Jung-won	December 17, 1970 (aged 23)	?	(South Korea) Sangmu FC
12	DF	Choi Young-il	April 25, 1966 (aged 28)	?	(South Korea) Hyundai Horangi
13	DF	An Ik-soo	May 6, 1965 (aged 29)	?	(South Korea) Ilhwa Chunma
14	MF	Choi Dae-shik	January 10, 1965 (aged 29)	?	(South Korea) LG Cheetahs
15	MF	Cho Jin-ho	August 2, 1971 (aged 22)	?	(South Korea) POSCO Atoms
16	MF	Ha Seok-ju	February 20, 1968 (aged 26)	?	(South Korea) Daewoo Royals
17	DF	Gu Sang-bum	June 15, 1964 (aged 30)	?	(South Korea) Daewoo Royals
18	FW	Hwang Sun-hong	July 14, 1968 (aged 25)	?	(South Korea) POSCO Atoms
19	MF	Choi Moon-sik	January 6, 1971 (aged 23)	?	(South Korea) POSCO Atoms
20	DF	Hong Myung-bo	February 12, 1969 (aged 25)	?	(South Korea) POSCO Atoms
21	GK	Park Chul-woo	September 29, 1965 (aged 28)	?	(South Korea) LG Cheetahs
22	GK	Lee Woon-jae	April 26, 1973 (aged 21)	?	(South Korea) Kyung Hee University

=== Spain ===
Head coach: Javier Clemente

No.	Pos.	Player	Date of birth (age)	Caps	Club
1	GK	Andoni Zubizarreta (captain)	October 23, 1961 (aged 32)	87	(Spain) Barcelona
2	DF	Albert Ferrer	June 6, 1970 (aged 24)	16	(Spain) Barcelona
3	DF	Jorge Otero	January 28, 1969 (aged 25)	5	(Spain) Celta Vigo
4	DF	Paco Camarasa	September 27, 1967 (aged 26)	9	(Spain) Valencia
5	DF	Abelardo Fernández	April 19, 1970 (aged 24)	9	(Spain) Sporting Gijón
6	MF	Fernando Hierro	March 23, 1968 (aged 26)	23	(Spain) Real Madrid
7	MF	Jon Andoni Goikoetxea	October 21, 1965 (aged 28)	22	(Spain) Barcelona
8	MF	Julen Guerrero	January 7, 1974 (aged 20)	9	(Spain) Athletic Bilbao
9	MF	Josep Guardiola	January 18, 1971 (aged 23)	11	(Spain) Barcelona
10	MF	José María Bakero	February 11, 1963 (aged 31)	25	(Spain) Barcelona
11	FW	Aitor Begiristain	August 12, 1964 (aged 29)	21	(Spain) Barcelona
12	DF	Sergi Barjuán	December 28, 1971 (aged 22)	2	(Spain) Barcelona
13	GK	Santiago Cañizares	December 18, 1969 (aged 24)	4	(Spain) Celta Vigo
14	FW	Juanele	April 10, 1971 (aged 23)	5	(Spain) Sporting Gijón
15	MF	José Luis Caminero	November 8, 1967 (aged 26)	4	(Spain) Atlético Madrid
16	MF	Felipe Miñambres	April 29, 1965 (aged 29)	4	(Spain) Tenerife
17	DF	Voro	October 9, 1963 (aged 30)	4	(Spain) Deportivo La Coruña
18	DF	Rafael Alkorta	September 16, 1968 (aged 25)	19	(Spain) Real Madrid
19	FW	Julio Salinas	September 11, 1962 (aged 31)	43	(Spain) Barcelona
20	DF	Miguel Ángel Nadal	July 28, 1966 (aged 27)	12	(Spain) Barcelona
21	FW	Luis Enrique	May 8, 1970 (aged 24)	5	(Spain) Real Madrid
22	GK	Julen Lopetegui	August 28, 1966 (aged 27)	1	(Spain) Logroñés

== Group D ==
=== Argentina ===
Head coach: Alfio Basile

No.	Pos.	Player	Date of birth (age)	Caps	Club
1	GK	Sergio Goycochea	October 17, 1963 (aged 30)	36	(Argentina) River Plate
2	DF	Sergio Vázquez	November 23, 1965 (aged 28)	24	(Chile) Universidad Católica
3	DF	José Chamot	May 17, 1969 (aged 25)	9	(Italy) Foggia
4	DF	Roberto Sensini	October 12, 1966 (aged 27)	21	(Italy) Parma
5	MF	Fernando Redondo	June 6, 1969 (aged 25)	16	(Spain) Tenerife
6	DF	Oscar Ruggeri	January 26, 1962 (aged 32)	93	(Argentina) San Lorenzo
7	FW	Claudio Caniggia	January 9, 1967 (aged 27)	35	(Italy) Roma
8	MF	José Basualdo	June 20, 1963 (aged 30)	21	(Argentina) Vélez Sársfield
9	FW	Gabriel Batistuta	February 1, 1969 (aged 25)	33	(Italy) Fiorentina
10	MF	Diego Maradona (captain)	October 30, 1960 (aged 33)	89	Unattached
11	FW	Ramón Medina Bello	April 29, 1966 (aged 28)	10	(Japan) Yokohama Marinos
12	GK	Luis Islas	December 22, 1965 (aged 28)	27	(Argentina) Independiente
13	DF	Fernando Cáceres	February 7, 1969 (aged 25)	7	(Spain) Zaragoza
14	MF	Diego Simeone	April 28, 1970 (aged 24)	37	(Spain) Sevilla
15	DF	Jorge Borelli	November 2, 1964 (aged 29)	12	(Argentina) Racing
16	DF	Hernán Díaz	February 26, 1965 (aged 29)	21	(Argentina) River Plate
17	MF	Ariel Ortega	March 4, 1974 (aged 20)	10	(Argentina) River Plate
18	MF	Hugo Pérez	October 6, 1968 (aged 25)	8	(Argentina) Independiente
19	FW	Abel Balbo	June 1, 1966 (aged 28)	11	(Italy) Roma
20	MF	Leonardo Rodríguez	August 27, 1966 (aged 27)	24	(Germany) Borussia Dortmund
21	MF	Alejandro Mancuso	September 4, 1968 (aged 25)	5	(Argentina) Boca Juniors
22	GK	Norberto Scoponi	January 13, 1961 (aged 33)	0	(Argentina) Newell's Old Boys

=== Bulgaria ===
Head coach: Dimitar Penev

No.	Pos.	Player	Date of birth (age)	Caps	Club
1	GK	Borislav Mihaylov (captain)	February 12, 1963 (aged 31)	66	(France) Mulhouse
2	DF	Emil Kremenliev	August 13, 1969 (aged 24)	7	(Bulgaria) Levski Sofia
3	DF	Trifon Ivanov	July 27, 1965 (aged 28)	39	(Switzerland) Neuchâtel Xamax
4	DF	Tsanko Tsvetanov	January 6, 1970 (aged 24)	16	(Bulgaria) Levski Sofia
5	DF	Petar Hubchev	February 26, 1964 (aged 30)	15	(Germany) Hamburger SV
6	MF	Zlatko Yankov	August 7, 1966 (aged 27)	31	(Bulgaria) Levski Sofia
7	FW	Emil Kostadinov	August 12, 1967 (aged 26)	32	(Portugal) Porto
8	FW	Hristo Stoichkov	February 8, 1966 (aged 28)	41	(Spain) Barcelona
9	MF	Yordan Letchkov	July 9, 1967 (aged 26)	14	(Germany) Hamburger SV
10	FW	Nasko Sirakov	April 26, 1962 (aged 32)	55	(Bulgaria) Levski Sofia
11	MF	Daniel Borimirov	January 16, 1970 (aged 24)	9	(Bulgaria) Levski Sofia
12	GK	Plamen Nikolov	August 20, 1961 (aged 32)	5	(Bulgaria) Levski Sofia
13	MF	Ivaylo Yordanov	April 22, 1968 (aged 26)	10	(Portugal) Sporting CP
14	MF	Boncho Genchev	July 7, 1964 (aged 29)	4	(England) Ipswich Town
15	DF	Nikolay Iliev	March 31, 1964 (aged 30)	48	(France) Rennes
16	DF	Iliyan Kiryakov	August 4, 1967 (aged 26)	35	(Spain) Mérida
17	FW	Petar Mihtarski	July 15, 1966 (aged 27)	5	(Bulgaria) Pirin Blagoevgrad
18	FW	Petar Aleksandrov	December 7, 1962 (aged 31)	26	(Bulgaria) Levski Sofia
19	MF	Georgi Georgiev	January 10, 1963 (aged 31)	10	(France) Mulhouse
20	MF	Krasimir Balakov	March 29, 1966 (aged 28)	33	(Portugal) Sporting CP
21	FW	Velko Yotov	August 26, 1970 (aged 23)	6	(Spain) Espanyol
22	FW	Ivaylo Andonov	August 14, 1967 (aged 26)	5	(Bulgaria) CSKA Sofia

=== Greece ===
Head coach: Alketas Panagoulias

No.	Pos.	Player	Date of birth (age)	Caps	Club
1	GK	Antonis Minou	May 4, 1958 (aged 36)	15	(Greece) Apollon Athens
2	DF	Stratos Apostolakis	May 11, 1964 (aged 30)	60	(Greece) Panathinaikos
3	DF	Thanasis Kolitsidakis	November 20, 1966 (aged 27)	12	(Greece) Panathinaikos
4	DF	Stelios Manolas	July 13, 1961 (aged 32)	70	(Greece) AEK Athens
5	DF	Giannis Kalitzakis	February 10, 1966 (aged 28)	36	(Greece) Panathinaikos
6	MF	Panagiotis Tsalouchidis	March 30, 1963 (aged 31)	60	(Greece) Olympiacos
7	FW	Dimitris Saravakos	July 26, 1961 (aged 32)	76	(Greece) Panathinaikos
8	MF	Nikos Nioplias	January 17, 1965 (aged 29)	36	(Greece) Panathinaikos
9	FW	Nikos Machlas	June 16, 1973 (aged 21)	12	(Greece) OFI
10	MF	Tasos Mitropoulos (captain)	August 23, 1957 (aged 36)	74	(Greece) AEK Athens
11	MF	Nikos Tsiantakis	October 20, 1963 (aged 30)	45	(Greece) Olympiacos
12	MF	Spyros Marangos	February 20, 1967 (aged 27)	21	(Greece) Panathinaikos
13	DF	Vaios Karagiannis	June 25, 1968 (aged 25)	6	(Greece) AEK Athens
14	FW	Vasilis Dimitriadis	February 1, 1966 (aged 28)	26	(Greece) AEK Athens
15	GK	Christos Karkamanis	September 22, 1969 (aged 24)	5	(Greece) Aris
16	FW	Alexis Alexoudis	June 20, 1972 (aged 21)	3	(Greece) OFI
17	MF	Minas Hantzidis	July 4, 1966 (aged 27)	7	(Greece) Olympiacos
18	DF	Kyriakos Karataidis	July 4, 1965 (aged 28)	14	(Greece) Olympiacos
19	MF	Savvas Kofidis	March 21, 1961 (aged 33)	64	(Greece) Aris
20	GK	Ilias Atmatsidis	April 24, 1969 (aged 25)	4	(Greece) AEK Athens
21	FW	Alexis Alexandris	October 21, 1968 (aged 25)	10	(Greece) Olympiacos
22	DF	Alexandros Alexiou	September 8, 1963 (aged 30)	8	(Greece) PAOK

=== Nigeria ===
Head coach: (Netherlands) Clemens Westerhof

No.	Pos.	Player	Date of birth (age)	Caps	Club
1	GK	Peter Rufai	August 24, 1963 (aged 30)	49	(Netherlands) Go Ahead Eagles
2	DF	Augustine Eguavoen	August 19, 1965 (aged 28)	35	(Belgium) Kortrijk
3	DF	Benedict Iroha	November 29, 1969 (aged 24)	1	(Netherlands) Vitesse
4	DF	Stephen Keshi (captain)	January 23, 1962 (aged 32)	66	Unattached
5	DF	Uche Okechukwu	September 27, 1967 (aged 26)	26	(Turkey) Fenerbahçe
6	DF	Chidi Nwanu	January 1, 1967 (aged 27)	3	(Belgium) Anderlecht
7	MF	Finidi George	April 15, 1971 (aged 23)	23	(Netherlands) Ajax
8	MF	Thompson Oliha	October 4, 1968 (aged 25)	6	(Ivory Coast) Africa Sports
9	FW	Rashidi Yekini	October 23, 1963 (aged 30)	49	(Portugal) Vitória de Setúbal
10	MF	Jay-Jay Okocha	August 14, 1973 (aged 20)	10	(Germany) Eintracht Frankfurt
11	MF	Emmanuel Amunike	December 25, 1970 (aged 23)	8	(Egypt) Zamalek
12	FW	Samson Siasia	August 14, 1967 (aged 26)	32	(France) Nantes
13	DF	Emeka Ezeugo	December 16, 1965 (aged 28)	8	(Hungary) Budapest Honvéd
14	FW	Daniel Amokachi	December 30, 1972 (aged 21)	26	(Belgium) Club Brugge
15	MF	Sunday Oliseh	September 14, 1974 (aged 19)	8	(Belgium) FC Liège
16	GK	Alloysius Agu	July 12, 1967 (aged 26)	5	(Belgium) FC Liège
17	FW	Victor Ikpeba	June 12, 1973 (aged 21)	10	(France) Monaco
18	FW	Efan Ekoku	June 8, 1967 (aged 27)	3	(England) Norwich City
19	DF	Michael Emenalo	July 14, 1965 (aged 28)	0	(Germany) Eintracht Trier
20	DF	Uche Okafor	August 8, 1967 (aged 26)	6	Unattached
21	MF	Mutiu Adepoju	December 22, 1970 (aged 23)	18	(Spain) Racing Santander
22	GK	Wilfred Agbonavbare	October 5, 1966 (aged 27)	1	(Spain) Rayo Vallecano

== Group E ==
=== Italy ===
Head coach: Arrigo Sacchi

No.	Pos.	Player	Date of birth (age)	Caps	Club
1	GK	Gianluca Pagliuca	December 18, 1966 (aged 27)	18	(Italy) Sampdoria
2	DF	Luigi Apolloni	May 2, 1967 (aged 27)	1	(Italy) Parma
3	DF	Antonio Benarrivo	August 21, 1968 (aged 25)	8	(Italy) Parma
4	DF	Alessandro Costacurta	April 24, 1966 (aged 28)	20	(Italy) Milan
5	DF	Paolo Maldini	June 26, 1968 (aged 25)	51	(Italy) Milan
6	DF	Franco Baresi (captain)	May 8, 1960 (aged 34)	77	(Italy) Milan
7	DF	Lorenzo Minotti	February 8, 1967 (aged 27)	2	(Italy) Parma
8	DF	Roberto Mussi	August 25, 1963 (aged 30)	2	(Italy) Torino
9	DF	Mauro Tassotti	January 19, 1960 (aged 34)	5	(Italy) Milan
10	FW	Roberto Baggio	February 18, 1967 (aged 27)	36	(Italy) Juventus
11	MF	Demetrio Albertini	August 23, 1971 (aged 22)	15	(Italy) Milan
12	GK	Luca Marchegiani	February 22, 1966 (aged 28)	5	(Italy) Lazio
13	MF	Dino Baggio	July 24, 1971 (aged 22)	13	(Italy) Juventus
14	MF	Nicola Berti	April 14, 1967 (aged 27)	26	(Italy) Inter Milan
15	MF	Antonio Conte	July 31, 1969 (aged 24)	1	(Italy) Juventus
16	MF	Roberto Donadoni	September 9, 1963 (aged 30)	51	(Italy) Milan
17	MF	Alberico Evani	January 1, 1963 (aged 31)	11	(Italy) Sampdoria
18	FW	Pierluigi Casiraghi	March 4, 1969 (aged 25)	16	(Italy) Lazio
19	FW	Daniele Massaro	May 23, 1961 (aged 33)	9	(Italy) Milan
20	FW	Giuseppe Signori	February 17, 1968 (aged 26)	16	(Italy) Lazio
21	FW	Gianfranco Zola	July 5, 1966 (aged 27)	6	(Italy) Parma
22	GK	Luca Bucci	March 13, 1969 (aged 25)	0	(Italy) Parma

=== Mexico ===
Head coach: Miguel Mejía Barón

No.	Pos.	Player	Date of birth (age)	Caps	Club
1	GK	Jorge Campos	October 15, 1966 (aged 27)	54	(Mexico) Pumas UNAM
2	DF	Claudio Suárez	December 17, 1968 (aged 25)	41	(Mexico) Pumas UNAM
3	DF	Juan Ramírez Perales	March 8, 1969 (aged 25)	42	(Mexico) Pumas UNAM
4	DF	Ignacio Ambríz (captain)	February 7, 1965 (aged 29)	51	(Mexico) Necaxa
5	MF	Ramón Ramírez	December 5, 1969 (aged 24)	31	(Mexico) Santos Laguna
6	MF	Marcelino Bernal	May 27, 1962 (aged 32)	28	(Mexico) Toluca
7	FW	Carlos Hermosillo	August 24, 1964 (aged 29)	57	(Mexico) Cruz Azul
8	MF	Alberto García Aspe	May 11, 1967 (aged 27)	29	(Mexico) Necaxa
9	FW	Hugo Sánchez	July 11, 1958 (aged 35)	57	(Spain) Rayo Vallecano
10	FW	Luis García	June 1, 1969 (aged 25)	31	(Spain) Atlético Madrid
11	FW	Zague	May 23, 1967 (aged 27)	48	(Mexico) América
12	GK	Félix Fernández	January 11, 1967 (aged 27)	3	(Mexico) Atlante
13	MF	Juan Carlos Chávez	January 18, 1967 (aged 27)	2	(Mexico) Atlas
14	MF	Joaquín del Olmo	April 20, 1969 (aged 25)	17	(Mexico) Veracruz
15	MF	Missael Espinoza	April 12, 1965 (aged 29)	35	(Mexico) Guadalajara
16	FW	Luis Antonio Valdéz	July 1, 1965 (aged 28)	11	(Mexico) León
17	MF	Benjamín Galindo	December 11, 1960 (aged 33)	35	(Mexico) Guadalajara
18	DF	José Luis Salgado	April 3, 1966 (aged 28)	2	(Mexico) Tecos UAG
19	FW	Luis Miguel Salvador	February 26, 1968 (aged 26)	17	(Mexico) Atlante
20	MF	Jorge Rodríguez	April 18, 1968 (aged 26)	22	(Mexico) Toluca
21	DF	Raúl Gutiérrez	October 16, 1966 (aged 27)	21	(Mexico) Atlante
22	GK	Adrián Chávez	June 27, 1962 (aged 31)	7	(Mexico) América

=== Norway ===
Head coach: Egil Olsen

No.	Pos.	Player	Date of birth (age)	Caps	Club
1	GK	Erik Thorstvedt	October 28, 1962 (aged 31)	84	(England) Tottenham Hotspur
2	DF	Gunnar Halle	August 11, 1965 (aged 28)	44	(England) Oldham Athletic
3	DF	Erland Johnsen	April 5, 1967 (aged 27)	20	(England) Chelsea
4	DF	Rune Bratseth (captain)	March 19, 1961 (aged 33)	57	(Germany) Werder Bremen
5	DF	Stig Inge Bjørnebye	December 11, 1969 (aged 24)	34	(England) Liverpool
6	FW	Jostein Flo	October 3, 1964 (aged 29)	23	(England) Sheffield United
7	MF	Erik Mykland	July 21, 1971 (aged 22)	25	(Norway) Start
8	MF	Øyvind Leonhardsen	August 17, 1970 (aged 23)	29	(Norway) Rosenborg
9	FW	Jan Åge Fjørtoft	January 10, 1967 (aged 27)	50	(England) Swindon Town
10	MF	Kjetil Rekdal	November 6, 1968 (aged 25)	32	(Belgium) Lierse
11	FW	Mini Jakobsen	November 8, 1965 (aged 28)	44	(Belgium) Lierse
12	GK	Frode Grodås	October 24, 1964 (aged 29)	12	(Norway) Lillestrøm
13	GK	Ola By Rise	November 14, 1960 (aged 33)	25	(Norway) Rosenborg
14	DF	Roger Nilsen	August 8, 1969 (aged 24)	20	(England) Sheffield United
15	DF	Karl Petter Løken	August 14, 1966 (aged 27)	32	(Norway) Rosenborg
16	FW	Gøran Sørloth	July 16, 1962 (aged 31)	54	(Turkey) Bursaspor
17	DF	Dan Eggen	January 13, 1970 (aged 24)	2	(Denmark) Brøndby
18	DF	Alf-Inge Haaland	November 23, 1972 (aged 21)	3	(England) Nottingham Forest
19	MF	Roar Strand	February 2, 1970 (aged 24)	1	(Norway) Rosenborg
20	DF	Henning Berg	September 1, 1969 (aged 24)	16	(England) Blackburn Rovers
21	FW	Sigurd Rushfeldt	December 11, 1972 (aged 21)	1	(Norway) Tromsø
22	MF	Lars Bohinen	September 8, 1969 (aged 24)	29	(England) Nottingham Forest

=== Republic of Ireland ===
Head coach: (England) Jack Charlton

No.	Pos.	Player	Date of birth (age)	Caps	Club
1	GK	Packie Bonner	May 24, 1960 (aged 34)	73	(Scotland) Celtic
2	DF	Denis Irwin	October 31, 1965 (aged 28)	26	(England) Manchester United
3	DF	Terry Phelan	March 16, 1967 (aged 27)	22	(England) Manchester City
4	DF	Kevin Moran	April 29, 1956 (aged 38)	71	(England) Blackburn Rovers
5	DF	Paul McGrath	December 4, 1959 (aged 34)	65	(England) Aston Villa
6	MF	Roy Keane	August 10, 1971 (aged 22)	22	(England) Manchester United
7	MF	Andy Townsend (captain)	July 23, 1963 (aged 30)	45	(England) Aston Villa
8	MF	Ray Houghton	January 9, 1962 (aged 32)	58	(England) Aston Villa
9	FW	John Aldridge	September 18, 1958 (aged 35)	57	(England) Tranmere Rovers
10	MF	John Sheridan	October 1, 1964 (aged 29)	20	(England) Sheffield Wednesday
11	DF	Steve Staunton	January 19, 1969 (aged 25)	47	(England) Aston Villa
12	DF	Gary Kelly	July 9, 1974 (aged 19)	5	(England) Leeds United
13	DF	Alan Kernaghan	April 25, 1967 (aged 27)	11	(England) Manchester City
14	DF	Phil Babb	October 30, 1970 (aged 23)	5	(England) Coventry City
15	FW	Tommy Coyne	November 14, 1962 (aged 31)	14	(Scotland) Motherwell
16	FW	Tony Cascarino	September 1, 1962 (aged 31)	50	(England) Chelsea
17	FW	Eddie McGoldrick	April 30, 1965 (aged 29)	12	(England) Arsenal
18	MF	Ronnie Whelan	September 25, 1961 (aged 32)	50	(England) Liverpool
19	MF	Alan McLoughlin	April 20, 1967 (aged 27)	17	(England) Portsmouth
20	FW	David Kelly	November 25, 1965 (aged 28)	16	(England) Wolverhampton Wanderers
21	MF	Jason McAteer	June 18, 1971 (aged 22)	5	(England) Bolton Wanderers
22	GK	Alan Kelly	August 11, 1968 (aged 25)	3	(England) Sheffield United

== Group F ==
=== Belgium ===
Head coach: Paul Van Himst

No.	Pos.	Player	Date of birth (age)	Caps	Club
1	GK	Michel Preud'homme	January 24, 1959 (aged 35)	51	(Belgium) Mechelen
2	DF	Dirk Medved	September 15, 1968 (aged 25)	13	(Belgium) Club Brugge
3	DF	Vital Borkelmans	June 1, 1963 (aged 31)	19	(Belgium) Club Brugge
4	DF	Philippe Albert	August 10, 1967 (aged 26)	30	(Belgium) Anderlecht
5	DF	Rudi Smidts	August 12, 1963 (aged 30)	12	(Belgium) Antwerp
6	MF	Lorenzo Staelens	April 30, 1964 (aged 30)	19	(Belgium) Club Brugge
7	MF	Franky Van der Elst	April 30, 1961 (aged 33)	61	(Belgium) Club Brugge
8	FW	Luc Nilis	May 25, 1967 (aged 27)	25	(Belgium) Anderlecht
9	FW	Marc Degryse	September 4, 1965 (aged 28)	48	(Belgium) Anderlecht
10	MF	Enzo Scifo	February 19, 1966 (aged 28)	64	(France) Monaco
11	FW	Alexandre Czerniatynski	July 28, 1960 (aged 33)	30	(Belgium) Mechelen
12	GK	Filip De Wilde	July 5, 1964 (aged 29)	4	(Belgium) Anderlecht
13	DF	Georges Grün (captain)	January 25, 1962 (aged 32)	69	(Italy) Parma
14	DF	Michel De Wolf	January 19, 1958 (aged 36)	37	(Belgium) Anderlecht
15	MF	Marc Emmers	February 25, 1966 (aged 28)	33	(Belgium) Anderlecht
16	MF	Danny Boffin	July 10, 1965 (aged 28)	19	(Belgium) Anderlecht
17	FW	Josip Weber	November 16, 1964 (aged 29)	2	(Belgium) Cercle Brugge
18	MF	Marc Wilmots	February 22, 1969 (aged 25)	23	(Belgium) Standard Liège
19	DF	Eric Van Meir	February 28, 1968 (aged 26)	2	(Belgium) Charleroi
20	GK	Dany Verlinden	August 15, 1963 (aged 30)	0	(Belgium) Club Brugge
21	MF	Stephan Van der Heyden	July 3, 1969 (aged 24)	3	(Belgium) Club Brugge
22	DF	Pascal Renier	August 3, 1971 (aged 22)	1	(Belgium) Club Brugge

=== Morocco ===
Head coach: Abdellah Blinda

No.	Pos.	Player	Date of birth (age)	Caps	Club
1	GK	Khalil Azmi	August 23, 1964 (aged 29)	19	(Morocco) Raja CA
2	DF	Nacer Abdellah	March 3, 1966 (aged 28)	10	(Belgium) Waregem
3	DF	Abdelkrim El Hadrioui	March 6, 1972 (aged 22)	13	(Morocco) AS FAR
4	MF	Tahar El Khalej	June 16, 1968 (aged 26)	19	(Morocco) KAC Marrakech
5	DF	Smahi Triki	August 1, 1967 (aged 26)	4	(France) Châteauroux
6	DF	Noureddine Naybet	February 10, 1970 (aged 24)	20	(France) Nantes
7	MF	Mustapha Hadji	November 16, 1971 (aged 22)	5	(France) Nancy
8	MF	Rachid Azzouzi	January 10, 1971 (aged 23)	6	(Germany) Duisburg
9	FW	Mohammed Chaouch	December 12, 1966 (aged 27)	16	(France) Nice
10	MF	Mustafa El Haddaoui (captain)	July 28, 1961 (aged 32)	46	(France) Angers
11	MF	Rachid Daoudi	February 21, 1966 (aged 28)	22	(Morocco) Wydad AC
12	GK	Said Dghay	January 14, 1964 (aged 30)	2	(Morocco) CO Casablanca
13	FW	Ahmed Bahja	December 6, 1970 (aged 23)	0	(Morocco) KAC Marrakech
14	DF	Ahmed Masbahi	January 17, 1966 (aged 28)	14	(Morocco) KAC Marrakech
15	MF	El Arbi Hababi	August 12, 1967 (aged 26)	9	(Morocco) OC Khouribga
16	FW	Hassan Nader	July 8, 1965 (aged 28)	18	(Portugal) Farense
17	FW	Abdeslam Laghrissi	January 5, 1962 (aged 32)	32	(Morocco) Raja CA
18	DF	Rachid Neqrouz	April 10, 1972 (aged 22)	2	(Morocco) MC Oujda
19	FW	Abdelmajid Bouyboud	October 24, 1966 (aged 27)	20	(Morocco) Wydad AC
20	MF	Hassan Kachloul	February 19, 1973 (aged 21)	3	(France) Nîmes
21	MF	Mohamed Samadi	March 21, 1970 (aged 24)	11	(Morocco) AS FAR
22	GK	Zakaria Alaoui	June 17, 1966 (aged 28)	5	(Morocco) KAC Marrakech

=== Netherlands ===
Head coach: Dick Advocaat

No.	Pos.	Player	Date of birth (age)	Caps	Club
1	GK	Ed de Goey	December 20, 1966 (aged 27)	14	(Netherlands) Feyenoord
2	DF	Frank de Boer	May 15, 1970 (aged 24)	25	(Netherlands) Ajax
3	MF	Frank Rijkaard	September 30, 1962 (aged 31)	69	(Netherlands) Ajax
4	DF	Ronald Koeman (captain)	March 21, 1963 (aged 31)	73	(Spain) Barcelona
5	MF	Rob Witschge	August 22, 1966 (aged 27)	22	(Netherlands) Feyenoord
6	MF	Jan Wouters	July 17, 1960 (aged 33)	66	(Netherlands) PSV Eindhoven
7	FW	Marc Overmars	March 29, 1973 (aged 21)	13	(Netherlands) Ajax
8	MF	Wim Jonk	October 12, 1966 (aged 27)	15	(Italy) Inter Milan
9	MF	Ronald de Boer	May 15, 1970 (aged 24)	9	(Netherlands) Ajax
10	FW	Dennis Bergkamp	May 10, 1969 (aged 25)	31	(Italy) Inter Milan
11	FW	Bryan Roy	February 12, 1970 (aged 24)	21	(Italy) Foggia
12	FW	John Bosman	February 1, 1965 (aged 29)	27	(Belgium) Anderlecht
13	GK	Edwin van der Sar	October 29, 1970 (aged 23)	0	(Netherlands) Ajax
14	DF	Ulrich van Gobbel	January 16, 1971 (aged 23)	6	(Netherlands) Feyenoord
15	DF	Danny Blind	August 1, 1961 (aged 32)	24	(Netherlands) Ajax
16	DF	Arthur Numan	December 14, 1969 (aged 24)	4	(Netherlands) PSV Eindhoven
17	FW	Gaston Taument	October 1, 1970 (aged 23)	6	(Netherlands) Feyenoord
18	DF	Stan Valckx	October 20, 1963 (aged 30)	7	(Portugal) Sporting CP
19	FW	Peter van Vossen	April 21, 1968 (aged 26)	10	(Netherlands) Ajax
20	MF	Aron Winter	March 1, 1967 (aged 27)	38	(Italy) Lazio
21	DF	John de Wolf	December 10, 1962 (aged 31)	6	(Netherlands) Feyenoord
22	GK	Theo Snelders	December 7, 1963 (aged 30)	1	(Scotland) Aberdeen

=== Saudi Arabia ===
Head coach: (Argentina) Jorge Solari

No.	Pos.	Player	Date of birth (age)	Caps	Club
1	GK	Mohamed Al-Deayea	August 2, 1972 (aged 21)	32	(Saudi Arabia) Al-Ta'ee
2	DF	Abdullah Al-Dosari	November 1, 1969 (aged 24)	12	(Saudi Arabia) Al-Ettifaq
3	DF	Mohammed Al-Khilaiwi	August 21, 1971 (aged 22)	37	(Saudi Arabia) Al-Ittihad
4	DF	Abdullah Sulaiman	November 15, 1973 (aged 20)	12	(Saudi Arabia) Al-Ahli
5	DF	Ahmed Jamil	January 6, 1970 (aged 24)	69	(Saudi Arabia) Al-Ittihad
6	MF	Fuad Anwar	October 13, 1972 (aged 21)	47	(Saudi Arabia) Al Shabab
7	FW	Fahad Al-Ghesheyan	August 1, 1973 (aged 20)	10	(Saudi Arabia) Al Hilal
8	MF	Fahad Al-Bishi	September 10, 1965 (aged 28)	15	(Saudi Arabia) Al Nassr
9	FW	Majed Abdullah (captain)	November 1, 1959 (aged 34)	114	(Saudi Arabia) Al Nassr
10	MF	Saeed Al-Owairan	August 19, 1967 (aged 26)	7	(Saudi Arabia) Al Shabab
11	FW	Fahad Al-Mehallel	November 11, 1970 (aged 23)	30	(Saudi Arabia) Al Shabab
12	FW	Sami Al-Jaber	December 11, 1972 (aged 21)	32	(Saudi Arabia) Al Hilal
13	DF	Mohamed Abd Al-Jawad	November 28, 1962 (aged 31)	117	(Saudi Arabia) Al Ahli
14	MF	Khaled Massad	November 23, 1971 (aged 22)	51	(Saudi Arabia) Al Ahli
15	DF	Saleh Al-Dawod	September 24, 1968 (aged 25)	7	(Saudi Arabia) Al Shabab
16	MF	Talal Jebreen	September 25, 1973 (aged 20)	1	(Saudi Arabia) Al-Riyadh
17	DF	Yassir Al-Taifi	May 10, 1971 (aged 23)	0	(Saudi Arabia) Al-Riyadh
18	DF	Awad Al-Anazi	September 24, 1968 (aged 25)	1	(Saudi Arabia) Al Shabab
19	MF	Hamzah Saleh	April 19, 1967 (aged 27)	9	(Saudi Arabia) Al Ahli
20	FW	Hamzah Idris	October 8, 1972 (aged 21)	7	(Saudi Arabia) Ohod
21	GK	Hussein Al-Sadiq	October 15, 1973 (aged 20)	4	(Saudi Arabia) Al Qadsiah
22	GK	Ibrahim Al-Helwah	August 18, 1972 (aged 21)	0	(Saudi Arabia) Al-Riyadh

== Notes ==
Each national team had to submit a squad of 22 players. All the teams included 3 goalkeepers, except Russia, Bulgaria and Republic of Ireland who only called two.

== Age ==
- Oldest: (Cameroon) Roger Milla (42 years, 28 days)
- Youngest: (Brazil) Ronaldo (17 years, 272 days)

=== Captains ===
- Oldest: (Bolivia) Carlos Borja (37 years, 174 days)
- Youngest: (United States) Tony Meola (25 years, 116 days)

=== Goalkeepers ===
- Oldest: (Cameroon) Joseph-Antoine Bell (39 years, 252 days)
- Youngest: (Saudi Arabia) Hussein Al-Sadiq (20 years, 245 days)

== Coaches representation by country ==
Nº	Country	Coaches
2	Argentina	Alfio Basile, Jorge Solari (Saudi Arabia)
2	England	Roy Hodgson (Switzerland), Jack Charlton (Republic of Ireland)
2	Netherlands	Dick Advocaat, Clemens Westerhof (Nigeria)
2	Spain	Xabier Azkargorta (Bolivia), Javier Clemente
1	Belgium	Paul Van Himst
1	Brazil	Carlos Alberto Parreira
1	Bulgaria	Dimitar Penev
1	Colombia	Francisco Maturana
1	(Federal Republic of Yugoslavia) FR Yugoslavia	Bora Milutinović (United States)
1	France	Henri Michel (Cameroon)
1	Germany	Berti Vogts
1	Greece	Alketas Panagoulias
1	Italy	Arrigo Sacchi
1	Mexico	Miguel Mejía Barón
1	Morocco	Abdellah Blinda
1	Norway	Egil Olsen
1	Romania	Anghel Iordănescu
1	Russia	Pavel Sadyrin
1	South Korea	Kim Ho
1	Sweden	Tommy Svensson
