= 1994 FIFA World Cup Group F =

Football tournament group stage

Group F of the 1994 FIFA World Cup was one of six groups of four teams competing at the 1994 World Cup in the United States. The first match was played June 19, 1994, and the final games took place simultaneously on June 29, 1994.

The group consisted of Belgium, Morocco, Netherlands, and Saudi Arabia. Netherlands won the group, Saudi Arabia finished second, and Belgium qualified as one of the best third-placed teams. Saudi Arabia became the first Asian team to beat a side from Africa in the competition's history.

== Standings ==
Pos	Team	Pld	W	D	L	GF	GA	GD	Pts	Qualification
1	Netherlands	3	2	0	1	4	3	+1	6 (Note: Head-to-head result: Netherlands 2–1 Saudi Arabia.)	Advance to knockout stage
2	Saudi Arabia	3	2	0	1	4	3	+1	6	Advance to knockout stage
3	Belgium	3	2	0	1	2	1	+1	6	Advance to knockout stage
4	Morocco	3	0	0	3	2	5	−3	0	

Source: FIFA

== Matches ==
All times local (EDT/UTC–4, CDT/UTC–5, PDT/UTC–7)

=== Belgium vs Morocco ===
June 19, 1994
12:30 p.m. EDT

Belgium	1–0	Morocco
Degryse 11'

Citrus Bowl, Orlando
Attendance: 61,219
Referee: José Torres Cadena (Colombia)

Belgium	Morocco

GK	1	Michel Preud'homme
DF	13	Georges Grün (c)	(yellow card) 81'
DF	14	Michel De Wolf
DF	5	Rudi Smidts
MF	6	Lorenzo Staelens
MF	7	Franky Van der Elst
MF	10	Enzo Scifo
MF	16	Danny Boffin		(substituted off) 85'
FW	8	Luc Nilis		(substituted off) 54'
FW	9	Marc Degryse
FW	17	Josip Weber	(yellow card) 85'
Substitutions:
MF	15	Marc Emmers		(substituted on) 54'
DF	3	Vital Borkelmans		(substituted on) 85'
Manager:
Paul Van Himst

GK	1	Khalil Azmi		(substituted off) 89'
DF	2	Nacer Abdellah
DF	5	Smahi Triki
DF	6	Noureddine Naybet	(yellow card) 23'
DF	3	Abdelkrim El Hadrioui
MF	8	Rachid Azzouzi	(yellow card) 89'
MF	15	El Arbi Hababi
MF	10	Mustafa El Haddaoui (c)		(substituted off) 69'
MF	11	Rachid Daoudi	(yellow card) 26'
MF	7	Mustapha Hadji
FW	9	Mohammed Chaouch		(substituted off) 82'
Substitutions:
FW	13	Ahmed Bahja		(substituted on) 69'
MF	21	Mohamed Samadi		(substituted on) 82'
GK	22	Zakaria Alaoui		(substituted on) 89'
Manager:
Abdellah Blinda

Assistant referees:
Raimundo Calix Garcia (Honduras)
Tapio Yli-Karro (Finland)
Fourth official:
Leslie Mottram (Scotland)

=== Netherlands vs Saudi Arabia ===
June 20, 1994
7:30 p.m. EDT

Netherlands	2–1	Saudi Arabia
Jonk 50'; Taument 86'		Anwar 18'

RFK Stadium, Washington, D.C.
Attendance: 50,535
Referee: Manuel Díaz Vega (Spain)

Netherlands	Saudi Arabia

GK	1	Ed de Goey
DF	14	Ulrich van Gobbel	(yellow card) 36'
DF	4	Ronald Koeman (c)
DF	2	Frank de Boer	(yellow card) 75'
MF	3	Frank Rijkaard
MF	8	Wim Jonk
MF	6	Jan Wouters
MF	9	Ronald de Boer
FW	7	Marc Overmars		(substituted off) 58'
FW	11	Bryan Roy		(substituted off) 81'
FW	10	Dennis Bergkamp
Substitutions:
MF	17	Gaston Taument		(substituted on) 58'
FW	19	Peter van Vossen		(substituted on) 81'
Manager:
Dick Advocaat

GK	1	Mohamed Al-Deayea
DF	2	Abdullah Al-Dosari	(yellow card) 28'
DF	5	Ahmad Jamil Madani
DF	3	Mohammed Al-Khilaiwi
DF	13	Mohamed Al-Jawad	(yellow card) 31'
MF	16	Talal Jebreen
MF	6	Fuad Anwar	(yellow card) 61'
MF	10	Saeed Al-Owairan		(substituted off) 69'
MF	14	Khalid Al-Muwallid
FW	8	Fahad Al-Bishi
FW	9	Majed Abdullah (c)		(substituted off) 46'
Substitutions:
FW	20	Hamzah Idris		(substituted on) 46'
MF	19	Hamzah Saleh		(substituted on) 69'
Manager:
(Argentina) Jorge Solari

Assistant referees:
Valentin Ivanov (Russia)
Sándor Márton (Hungary)
Fourth official:
Sándor Puhl (Hungary)

=== Belgium vs Netherlands ===
June 25, 1994
12:30 p.m. EDT

Belgium	1–0	Netherlands
Albert 65'

Citrus Bowl, Orlando
Attendance: 62,387
Referee: Renato Marsiglia (Brazil)

Belgium	Netherlands

GK	1	Michel Preud'homme
DF	15	Marc Emmers		(substituted off) 78'
DF	13	Georges Grün (c)
DF	4	Philippe Albert
DF	14	Michel De Wolf
DF	3	Vital Borkelmans	(yellow card) 20'	(substituted off) 61'
MF	10	Enzo Scifo
MF	7	Franky Van der Elst
MF	6	Lorenzo Staelens
FW	9	Marc Degryse
FW	17	Josip Weber
Substitutions:
MF	5	Rudi Smidts		(substituted on) 61'
DF	2	Dirk Medved		(substituted on) 78'
Manager:
Paul Van Himst

GK	1	Ed de Goey
DF	18	Stan Valckx
DF	4	Ronald Koeman (c)
DF	2	Frank de Boer
MF	3	Frank Rijkaard	(yellow card) 81'
MF	8	Wim Jonk	(yellow card) 39'
MF	6	Jan Wouters	(yellow card) 19'
MF	17	Gaston Taument		(substituted off) 64'
MF	9	Ronald de Boer		(substituted off) 46'
MF	11	Bryan Roy
FW	10	Dennis Bergkamp	(yellow card) 88'
Substitutions:
MF	5	Rob Witschge	(yellow card) 49'	(substituted on) 46'
MF	7	Marc Overmars		(substituted on) 64'
Manager:
Dick Advocaat

Assistant referees:
Paulo Jorge Alves (Brazil)
Michał Listkiewicz (Poland)
Fourth official:
Kurt Röthlisberger (Switzerland)

=== Saudi Arabia vs Morocco ===
Saudi Arabia became the first Asian team to beat a side from Africa in the competition's history.

June 25, 1994
12:30 p.m. EDT

Saudi Arabia	2–1	Morocco
Al-Jaber 7' (pen.); Anwar 45'		Chaouch 26'

Giants Stadium, East Rutherford
Attendance: 76,322
Referee: Philip Don (England)

Saudi Arabia	Morocco

GK	1	Mohamed Al-Deayea	(yellow card) 90'
DF	18	Awad Al-Anazi		(substituted off) 30'
DF	5	Ahmad Jamil Madani
DF	3	Mohammed Al-Khilaiwi
DF	13	Mohamed Al-Jawad (c)
MF	6	Fuad Anwar	(yellow card) 75'
MF	16	Talal Jebreen	(yellow card) 50'
MF	8	Fahad Al-Bishi
MF	14	Khalid Al-Muwallid	(yellow card) 78'
FW	10	Saeed Al-Owairan
FW	12	Sami Al-Jaber		(substituted off) 80'
Substitutions:
DF	4	Abdullah Zubromawi		(substituted on) 30'
FW	7	Fahad Al-Ghesheyan		(substituted on) 80'
Manager:
(Argentina) Jorge Solari

GK	1	Khalil Azmi (c)
DF	2	Nacer Abdellah		(substituted off) 57'
DF	5	Smahi Triki
DF	6	Noureddine Naybet	(yellow card) 83'
DF	3	Abdelkrim El Hadrioui	(yellow card) 34'
MF	8	Rachid Azzouzi
MF	15	El Arbi Hababi		(substituted off) 73'
MF	4	Tahar El Khalej
MF	11	Rachid Daoudi
FW	9	Mohammed Chaouch
FW	13	Ahmed Bahja
Substitutions:
FW	17	Abdeslam Laghrissi		(substituted on) 57'
MF	7	Mustapha Hadji		(substituted on) 73'
Manager:
Abdellah Blinda

Assistant referees:
Roy Pearson (England)
Tapio Yli-Karro (Finland)
Fourth official:
Hellmut Krug (Germany)

=== Belgium vs Saudi Arabia ===
June 29, 1994
12:30 p.m. EDT

Belgium	0–1	Saudi Arabia
		Al-Owairan 5'

RFK Stadium, Washington, D.C.
Attendance: 52,959
Referee: Hellmut Krug (Germany)

Belgium	Saudi Arabia

GK	1	Michel Preud'homme
DF	2	Dirk Medved
DF	14	Michel De Wolf
DF	4	Philippe Albert
DF	5	Rudi Smidts	(yellow card) 80'
MF	6	Lorenzo Staelens
MF	10	Enzo Scifo (c)	(yellow card) 61'
MF	7	Franky Van der Elst
MF	16	Danny Boffin
MF	18	Marc Wilmots		(substituted off) 54'
FW	9	Marc Degryse		(substituted off) 24'
Substitutions:
FW	8	Luc Nilis		(substituted on) 24'
FW	17	Josip Weber		(substituted on) 54'
Manager:
Paul Van Himst

GK	1	Mohamed Al-Deayea
DF	4	Abdullah Zubromawi
DF	5	Ahmad Jamil Madani	(yellow card) 3'
DF	3	Mohammed Al-Khilaiwi
DF	13	Mohamed Al-Jawad
MF	16	Talal Jebreen
MF	10	Saeed Al-Owairan		(substituted off) 62'
MF	19	Hamzah Saleh
FW	20	Hamzah Idris	(yellow card) 77'
FW	8	Fahad Al-Bishi
FW	9	Majed Abdullah (c)		(substituted off) 46'
Substitutions:
FW	14	Khalid Al-Muwallid		(substituted on) 46'
DF	2	Abdullah Al-Dosari		(substituted on) 62'
Manager:
(Argentina) Jorge Solari

Assistant referees:
Eugene Brazzale (Australia)
Ernesto Taibi (Argentina)
Fourth official:
Francisco Oscar Lamolina (Argentina)

=== Morocco vs Netherlands ===
June 29, 1994
12:30 p.m. EDT

Morocco	1–2	Netherlands
Nader 47'		Bergkamp 43'; Roy 77'

Citrus Bowl, Orlando
Attendance: 60,578
Referee: Alberto Tejada Noriega (Peru)

Morocco	Netherlands

GK	22	Zakaria Alaoui
DF	18	Rachid Neqrouz
DF	5	Smahi Triki
DF	3	Abdelkrim El Hadrioui
MF	21	Mohammed Samadi	(yellow card) 41'
MF	8	Rachid Azzouzi		(substituted off) 61'
MF	4	Tahar El Khalej (c)	(yellow card) 14'
MF	15	El Arbi Hababi	(yellow card) 28'
FW	19	Abdelmajid Bouyboud	(yellow card) 25'	(substituted off) 47'
FW	16	Hassan Nader	(yellow card) 12'
FW	13	Ahmed Bahja
Substitutions:
MF	7	Mustapha Hadji		(substituted on) 47'
MF	11	Rachid Daoudi		(substituted on) 61'
Manager:
Abdellah Blinda

GK	1	Ed de Goey
CB	18	Stan Valckx	(yellow card) 79'
CB	4	Ronald Koeman (c)
CB	2	Frank de Boer
RM	20	Aron Winter
CM	8	Wim Jonk
CM	6	Jan Wouters	(yellow card) 75'
LM	5	Rob Witschge
RF	7	Marc Overmars		(substituted off) 56'
CF	10	Dennis Bergkamp
LF	19	Peter van Vossen		(substituted off) 67'
Substitutions:
MF	17	Gaston Taument		(substituted on) 56'
MF	11	Bryan Roy		(substituted on) 67'
Manager:
Dick Advocaat

Assistant referees:
Venancio Concepcion Zarate (Paraguay)
Mikael Erik Everstig (Sweden)
Fourth official:
Bo Karlsson (Sweden)

== See also ==
- Belgium at the FIFA World Cup
- Morocco at the FIFA World Cup
- Netherlands at the FIFA World Cup
- Saudi Arabia at the FIFA World Cup
