= 1994 FIFA World Cup knockout stage =

Final stage of the 1994 FIFA World Cup

The 1994 FIFA World Cup knockout stage was the second and final stage of the 1994 FIFA World Cup finals in the United States. The stage began on July 2, 1994, and ended with the final at the Rose Bowl in Pasadena, California, on July 17, 1994.

Sixteen teams advanced to the knockout stage to compete in a single-elimination style tournament: The top two teams from each of the six groups, as well as the best four third-placed teams. In the round of 16, the four third-placed teams played against four of the group winners from groups A to D, with the remaining two group winners from group E and F taking on two of the group runners-up; the remaining four runners-up were paired off against each other. The winners of the eight round of 16 matches were then paired together in the quarterfinals, the winners of which played against each other in the semifinals.

The ties in each round were played over a single match; in the event that scores were level after 90 minutes, the teams would play an additional 30 minutes of extra time, divided into two 15-minute halves, to determine the winner. If the scores remained level after extra time, the teams would contest a penalty shootout.

A match for third place was also held on the day before the final, between the two losing teams of the semifinals.

== Qualified teams ==
The top two placed teams from each of the six groups, plus the four best-placed third teams, qualified for the knockout stage.

Group	Winners	Runners-up	Third-placed teams (Best four qualify)
A	Romania	Switzerland	United States
B	Brazil	Sweden	—N/a
C	Germany	Spain	—N/a
D	Nigeria	Bulgaria	Argentina
E	Mexico	Republic of Ireland	Italy
F	Netherlands	Saudi Arabia	Belgium

Based on group results, the matches would be the following in Round of 16:

Round of 16	Teams per qualified group positions	Teams identified
Match 1:	A1 – C3/D3/E3	Romania – Argentina
Match 2:	B2 – F2	Sweden – Saudi Arabia
Match 3:	F1 – E2	Netherlands – Ireland
Match 4:	B1 – A3/C3/D3	Brazil – United States
Match 5:	E1 – D2	Mexico – Bulgaria
Match 6:	C1 – A3/B3/F3	Germany – Belgium
Match 7:	D1 – B3/E3/F3	Nigeria – Italy
Match 8:	A2 – C2	Switzerland – Spain

The pairings for matches 1, 4, 6 and 7 depended on who the best third places were that qualified for the round of 16. The following table, published in Section 28 of the tournament regulations, shows the 15 different options to define the rivals of the winners of groups A, B, C and D.

Combination according to the four qualified teams

Third teams qualify from groups:	Romania (A1) plays vs.:	Brazil (B1) plays vs.:	Germany (C1) plays vs.:	Nigeria (D1) plays vs.:
A B C D	C3	D3	A3	B3
A B C E	C3	A3	B3	E3
A B C F	C3	A3	B3	F3
A B D E	D3	A3	B3	E3
A B D F	D3	A3	B3	F3
A B E F	E3	A3	B3	F3
A C D E	C3	D3	A3	E3
A C D F	C3	D3	A3	F3
A C E F	C3	A3	F3	E3
A D E F	D3	A3	F3	E3
B C D E	C3	D3	B3	E3
B C D F	C3	D3	B3	F3
B C E F	E3	C3	B3	F3
B D E F	E3	D3	B3	F3
C D E F	C3	D3	F3	E3

== Bracket ==
Round of 16
July 3 – Pasadena
Romania	3
Argentina	2
July 3 – Dallas
Saudi Arabia	1
Sweden	3
July 4 – Orlando
Netherlands	2
Republic of Ireland	0
July 4 – Stanford
Brazil	1
United States	0
July 5 – East Rutherford
Mexico	1 (1)
Bulgaria (p)	1 (3)
July 2 – Chicago
Germany	3
Belgium	2
July 5 – Foxborough
Nigeria	1
Italy (a.e.t.)	2
July 2 – Washington
Spain	3
Switzerland	0

Quarterfinals
July 10 – Stanford
Romania	2 (4)
Sweden (p)	2 (5)
July 9 – Dallas
Netherlands	2
Brazil	3
July 10 – East Rutherford
Bulgaria	2
Germany	1
July 9 – Foxborough
Italy	2
Spain	1

Semifinals
July 13 – Pasadena
Sweden	0
Brazil	1
July 13 – East Rutherford
Bulgaria	1
Italy	2

Final
July 17 – Pasadena
Brazil (p)	0 (3)
Italy	0 (2)
Match for third place
July 16 – Pasadena
Sweden	4
Bulgaria	0

== Round of 16 ==
=== Germany vs Belgium ===
July 2, 1994
12:00 p.m. CDT (UTC–5)

Germany	3–2	Belgium
Völler 6', 38'; Klinsmann 11'		Grün 8'; Albert 90'

Soldier Field, Chicago
Attendance: 60,246
Referee: Kurt Röthlisberger (Switzerland)

Germany	Belgium

GK	1	Bodo Illgner
DF	4	Jürgen Kohler
DF	5	Thomas Helmer	(yellow card) 13'
DF	6	Guido Buchwald
MF	8	Thomas Häßler
MF	10	Lothar Matthäus (c)		(substituted off) 45'
FW	13	Rudi Völler
DF	14	Thomas Berthold
MF	16	Matthias Sammer
MF	17	Martin Wagner	(yellow card) 37'
FW	18	Jürgen Klinsmann		(substituted off) 86'
Substitutions:
MF	3	Andreas Brehme		(substituted on) 45'
FW	11	Stefan Kuntz		(substituted on) 86'
Manager:
Berti Vogts

GK	1	Michel Preud'homme
DF	4	Philippe Albert	(yellow card) 38'
DF	5	Rudi Smidts		(substituted off) 66'
MF	6	Lorenzo Staelens
MF	7	Franky Van der Elst
FW	8	Luc Nilis		(substituted off) 78'
MF	10	Enzo Scifo
DF	13	Georges Grün (c)
DF	14	Michel De Wolf
MF	15	Marc Emmers
FW	17	Josip Weber
Substitutions:
MF	16	Danny Boffin		(substituted on) 66'
FW	11	Alexandre Czerniatynski		(substituted on) 78'
Manager:
Paul Van Himst

=== Spain vs Switzerland ===
July 2, 1994
4:30 p.m. EDT (UTC–4)

Spain	3–0	Switzerland
Hierro 15'; Luis Enrique 74'; Begiristain 86' (pen.)

RFK Stadium, Washington, D.C.
Attendance: 53,121
Referee: Mario van der Ende (Netherlands)

Spain	Switzerland

GK	1	Andoni Zubizarreta (c)
RB	2	Albert Ferrer	(yellow card) 19'
CB	4	Paco Camarasa	(yellow card) 22'
CB	5	Abelardo
CB	18	Rafael Alkorta
LB	12	Sergi
MF	6	Fernando Hierro		(substituted off) 76'
MF	7	Jon Andoni Goikoetxea	(yellow card) 18'	(substituted off) 61'
MF	20	Miguel Ángel Nadal
AM	10	José Mari Bakero
CF	21	Luis Enrique
Substitutions:
MF	11	Txiki Begiristain		(substituted on) 61'
DF	3	Jorge Otero	(yellow card) 87'	(substituted on) 76'
Manager:
Javier Clemente

GK	1	Marco Pascolo	(yellow card) 85'
DF	2	Marc Hottiger	(yellow card) 23'
DF	3	Yvan Quentin		(substituted off) 58'
DF	4	Dominique Herr
DF	5	Alain Geiger (c)
MF	6	Georges Bregy
DF	8	Christophe Ohrel		(substituted off) 73'
FW	9	Adrian Knup
MF	10	Ciriaco Sforza
FW	11	Stéphane Chapuisat
MF	16	Thomas Bickel
Substitutions:
DF	19	Jürg Studer	(yellow card) 69'	(substituted on) 58'
FW	14	Nestor Subiat	(yellow card) 77'	(substituted on) 73'
Manager:
(England) Roy Hodgson

=== Saudi Arabia vs Sweden ===
Saudi Arabia suffered a major setback with the absence of captain Majed Abdullah. An early strike from Martin Dahlin in the first half and a second-half brace by Kennet Andersson saw Sweden go through to the quarterfinals. Substitute Fahad Al-Ghesheyan pulled one back for the Saudis five minutes from the end.

July 3, 1994
12:00 p.m. CDT (UTC–5)

Saudi Arabia	1–3	Sweden
Al-Ghesheyan 85'		Dahlin 6'; K. Andersson 51', 88'

Cotton Bowl, Dallas
Attendance: 60,277
Referee: Renato Marsiglia (Brazil)

Saudi Arabia	Sweden

GK	1	Mohamed Al-Deayea
RB	4	Abdullah Zubromawi
CB	5	Ahmad Jamil Madani
CB	3	Mohammed Al-Khilaiwi
LB	13	Mohamed Al-Jawad (c)		(substituted off) 55'
RM	6	Fuad Anwar
CM	8	Fahad Al-Bishi		(substituted off) 63'
CM	10	Saeed Al-Owairan
LM	19	Hamzah Saleh
CF	12	Sami Al-Jaber
CF	20	Hamzah Idris
Substitutions:
FW	7	Fahad Al-Ghesheyan		(substituted on) 55'
MF	14	Khalid Al-Muwallid	(yellow card) 71'	(substituted on) 63'
Manager:
(Argentina) Jorge Solari

GK	1	Thomas Ravelli
RB	2	Roland Nilsson	(yellow card) 74'
CB	3	Patrik Andersson
CB	4	Joachim Björklund		(substituted off) 55'
LB	5	Roger Ljung	(yellow card) 16'
RM	11	Tomas Brolin
CM	9	Jonas Thern (c)	(yellow card) 67'	(substituted off) 70'
CM	6	Stefan Schwarz
LM	8	Klas Ingesson
CF	10	Martin Dahlin
CF	19	Kennet Andersson
Substitutions:
CB	14	Pontus Kåmark		(substituted on) 55'
CM	18	Håkan Mild		(substituted on) 70'
Manager:
Tommy Svensson

=== Romania vs Argentina ===
Two quick goals by Dumitrescu and one more by Hagi in the second half sealed the victory for Romanians. After Batistuta's penalty kick and Balbo's rebound Argentina attacked desperately but couldn't score for the third time.

July 3, 1994
1:30 p.m. PDT (UTC–7)

Romania	3–2	Argentina
Dumitrescu 11', 18'; Hagi 58'		Batistuta 16' (pen.); Balbo 75'

Rose Bowl, Pasadena
Attendance: 90,469
Referee: Pierluigi Pairetto (Italy)

Romania	Argentina

GK	1	Florin Prunea
DF	2	Dan Petrescu
DF	14	Gheorghe Mihali
DF	4	Miodrag Belodedici
DF	3	Daniel Prodan
DF	13	Tibor Selymes	(yellow card) 68'
MF	5	Ioan Lupescu
MF	6	Gheorghe Popescu	(yellow card) 50'
MF	7	Dorinel Munteanu
AM	10	Gheorghe Hagi (c)		(substituted off) 86'
CF	11	Ilie Dumitrescu	(yellow card) 84'	(substituted off) 89'
Substitutions:
MF	18	Constantin Gâlcă		(substituted on) 86'
MF	19	Corneliu Papură		(substituted on) 89'
Manager:
Anghel Iordănescu

GK	12	Luis Islas
RB	4	Roberto Sensini		(substituted off) 63'
CB	13	Fernando Cáceres	(yellow card) 83'
CB	6	Oscar Ruggeri (c)	(yellow card) 33'
LB	3	José Chamot	(yellow card) 56'
CM	14	Diego Simeone
CM	5	Fernando Redondo	(yellow card) 55'
CM	8	José Basualdo
AM	17	Ariel Ortega
CF	9	Gabriel Batistuta
CF	19	Abel Balbo
Substitutions:
FW	11	Ramón Medina Bello		(substituted on) 63'
Manager:
Alfio Basile

=== Netherlands vs Republic of Ireland ===
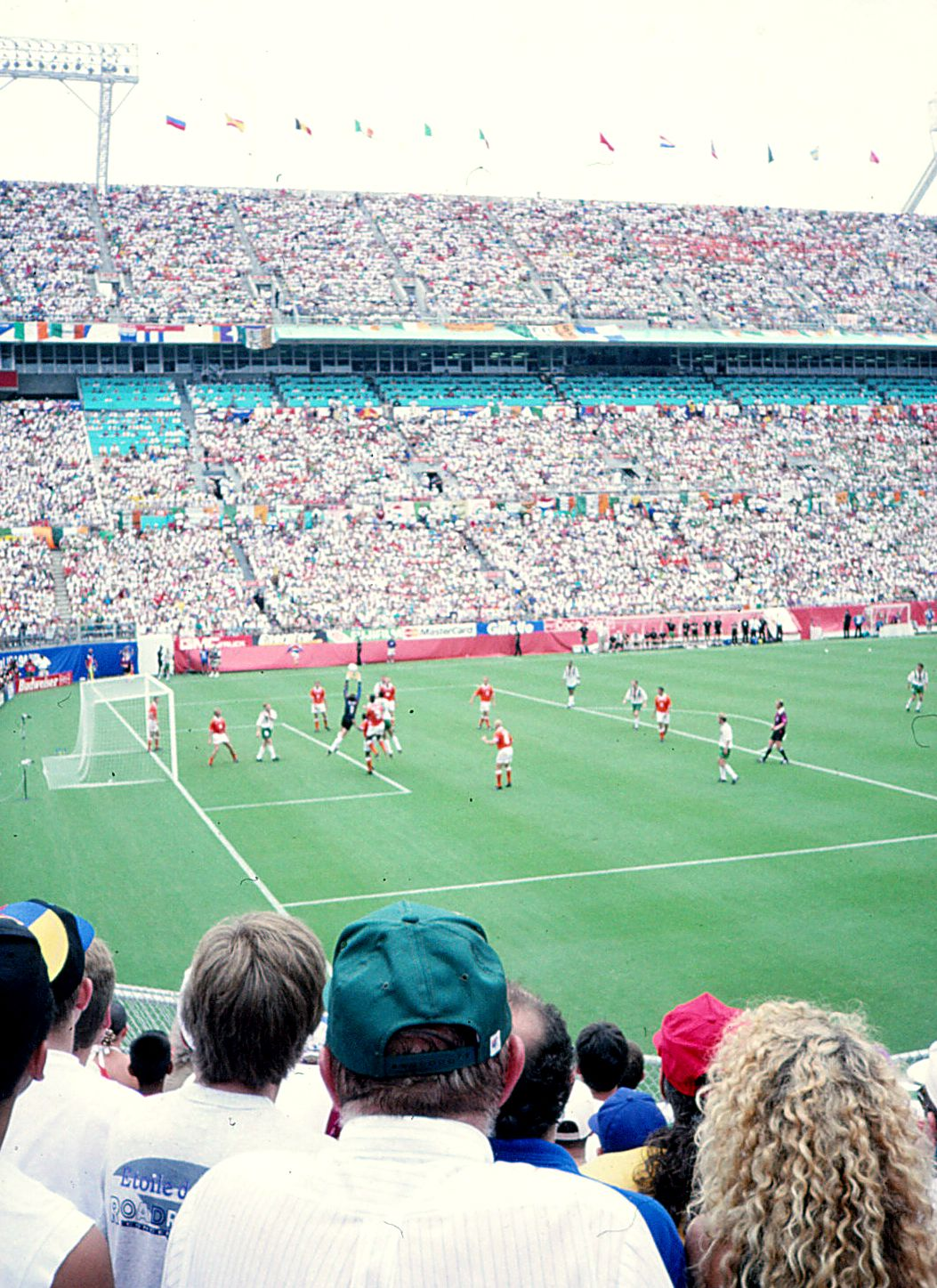
Republic of Ireland in attack in the game against the Netherlands.

July 4, 1994
12:00 p.m. EDT (UTC–4)

Netherlands	2–0	Republic of Ireland
Bergkamp 11'; Jonk 41'

Citrus Bowl, Orlando
Attendance: 61,355
Referee: Peter Mikkelsen (Denmark)

Netherlands	Republic of Ireland

GK	1	Ed de Goey
CB	18	Stan Valckx
CB	4	Ronald Koeman (c)	(yellow card) 72'
CB	2	Frank de Boer
RM	20	Aron Winter
CM	3	Frank Rijkaard
CM	8	Wim Jonk
LM	5	Rob Witschge		(substituted off) 79'
RF	7	Marc Overmars
CF	10	Dennis Bergkamp
LF	19	Peter van Vossen		(substituted off) 70'
Substitutions:
FW	11	Bryan Roy		(substituted on) 70'
DF	16	Arthur Numan		(substituted on) 79'
Manager:
Dick Advocaat

GK	1	Packie Bonner
RB	12	Gary Kelly
CB	5	Paul McGrath
CB	14	Phil Babb
LB	3	Terry Phelan
DM	6	Roy Keane
RM	8	Ray Houghton
CM	10	John Sheridan
CM	7	Andy Townsend (c)
LM	11	Steve Staunton	(substituted off) 63'
CF	15	Tommy Coyne	(substituted off) 74'
Substitutions:
MF	21	Jason McAteer	(substituted on) 63'
FW	16	Tony Cascarino	(substituted on) 74'
Manager:
(England) Jack Charlton

=== Brazil vs United States ===
This was the third time that Brazil defeated the host nation of tournament, after Sweden in 1958 and Chile in 1962 (coincidentally, on these three occasions Brazil became world champion). Since the kick off, Brazil set the pace, controlling ball possession and playing it on United States field. Left-back Leonardo was the main source of attacking, but during the last minute of the first half, after a ball dispute just by sideline, he threw his elbow at Tab Ramos' jaw, breaking it, knocking the North American down and being sent off. Later, Leonardo was handed a four-match suspension, keeping him out of the remainder of the tournament.

In the second half, Carlos Alberto Parreira put right-back Cafu on the left-back, benching Zinho. Even with one man down, Brazil kept the pace. In the 72nd minute, Romário recovered the ball in midfield, ran to the American's box and delivered it to Bebeto, who finished the play by shooting just between Tony Meola and the post. The United States were unable to respond, and Brazil held on for the win.

July 4, 1994
12:30 p.m. PDT (UTC–7)

Brazil	1–0	United States
Bebeto 72'

Stanford Stadium, Stanford
Attendance: 84,147
Referee: Joël Quiniou (France)

Brazil	United States

GK	1	Cláudio Taffarel
RB	2	Jorginho	(yellow card) 16'
CB	13	Aldair
CB	15	Márcio Santos
LB	16	Leonardo	(red card) 43'
RM	17	Mazinho	(yellow card) 8'
CM	5	Mauro Silva
CM	8	Dunga (c)
LM	9	Zinho		(substituted off) 69'
FW	7	Bebeto
FW	11	Romário
Substitutions:
LB	14	Cafu		(substituted on) 69'
Manager:
Carlos Alberto Parreira

GK	1	Tony Meola (c)
DF	17	Marcelo Balboa
DF	20	Paul Caligiuri	(yellow card) 49'
DF	21	Fernando Clavijo	(yellow card) 64' (yellow-red card) 85'
DF	22	Alexi Lalas
MF	5	Thomas Dooley	(yellow card) 80'
MF	7	Hugo Pérez		(substituted off) 66'
MF	9	Tab Ramos	(yellow card) 43'	(substituted off) 45'
MF	13	Cobi Jones
MF	16	Mike Sorber
FW	8	Earnie Stewart
Substitutions:
FW	11	Eric Wynalda		(substituted on) 45'
FW	10	Roy Wegerle		(substituted on) 66'
Manager:
(Federal Republic of Yugoslavia) Bora Milutinović

=== Nigeria vs Italy ===
July 5, 1994
1:00 p.m. EDT (UTC–4)

Nigeria	1–2 (a.e.t.)	Italy
Amunike 25'		R. Baggio 88', 102' (pen.)

Foxboro Stadium, Foxborough
Attendance: 54,367
Referee: Arturo Brizio Carter (Mexico)

Nigeria	Italy

GK	1	Peter Rufai (c)
DF	2	Augustine Eguavoen
DF	5	Uche Okechukwu
DF	6	Chidi Nwanu	(yellow card) 58'
MF	7	Finidi George
FW	9	Rashidi Yekini
MF	10	Jay Jay Okocha
MF	11	Emmanuel Amunike		(substituted off) 57'
FW	14	Daniel Amokachi		(substituted off) 35'
MF	15	Sunday Oliseh	(yellow card) 53'
DF	19	Michael Emenalo	(yellow card) 2'
Substitutions:
MF	21	Mutiu Adepoju	(yellow card) 41'	(substituted on) 35'
MF	8	Thompson Oliha		(substituted on) 57'
Manager:
(Netherlands) Clemens Westerhof

GK	12	Luca Marchegiani
RB	8	Roberto Mussi
CB	3	Antonio Benarrivo
CB	4	Alessandro Costacurta	(yellow card) 29'
LB	5	Paolo Maldini (c)	(yellow card) 80'
RM	14	Nicola Berti		(substituted off) 45'
CM	11	Demetrio Albertini
LM	16	Roberto Donadoni
RF	10	Roberto Baggio
CF	19	Daniele Massaro	(yellow card) 6'
LF	20	Giuseppe Signori	(yellow card) 60'	(substituted off) 65'
Substitutions:
MF	13	Dino Baggio	(yellow card) 62'	(substituted on) 45'
FW	21	Gianfranco Zola	(red card) 75'	(substituted on) 65'
Manager:
Arrigo Sacchi

=== Mexico vs Bulgaria ===
July 5, 1994
4:30 p.m. EDT (UTC–4)

Mexico	1–1 (a.e.t.)	Bulgaria
García Aspe 18' (pen.)		Stoichkov 6'
Penalties
García Aspe (penalty missed); Bernal (penalty missed); Rodríguez (penalty missed); Suárez (penalty scored)	1–3	(penalty missed) Balakov; (penalty scored) Genchev; (penalty scored) Borimirov; (penalty scored) Letchkov

Giants Stadium, East Rutherford
Attendance: 71,030
Referee: Jamal Al Sharif (Syria)

Mexico	Bulgaria

GK	1	Jorge Campos
RB	20	Jorge Rodríguez
CB	2	Claudio Suárez	(yellow card) 14'
CB	3	Juan Ramírez
LB	5	Ramón Ramírez	(yellow card) 70'
RM	6	Marcelino Bernal
CM	4	Ignacio Ambríz (c)
CM	8	Alberto García Aspe	(yellow card) 76'
LM	17	Benjamín Galindo
RF	10	Luis García	(yellow card) 28' (yellow-red card) 57'
LF	11	Luís Roberto Alves
Manager:
Miguel Mejía Barón

GK	1	Borislav Mihaylov (c)
RB	2	Emil Kremenliev	(yellow card) 12' (yellow-red card) 50'
CB	5	Petar Hubchev
CB	13	Ivaylo Yordanov	(yellow card) 67'
LB	16	Iliyan Kiryakov	(yellow card) 34'
CM	9	Yordan Letchkov
AM	11	Daniel Borimirov
CM	20	Krasimir Balakov
RF	7	Emil Kostadinov		(substituted off) 119'
CF	10	Nasko Sirakov	(yellow card) 17'	(substituted off) 104'
LF	8	Hristo Stoichkov
Substitutions:
MF	14	Boncho Genchev		(substituted on) 104'
MF	17	Petar Mihtarski		(substituted on) 119'
Manager:
Dimitar Penev

== Quarterfinals ==
=== Italy vs Spain ===
July 9, 1994
12:00 p.m. EDT (UTC–4)

Italy	2–1	Spain
D. Baggio 25'; R. Baggio 88'		Caminero 58'

Foxboro Stadium, Foxborough
Attendance: 53,400
Referee: Sándor Puhl (Hungary)

Italy	Spain

GK	1	Gianluca Pagliuca
RB	9	Mauro Tassotti
CB	4	Alessandro Costacurta
CB	5	Paolo Maldini (c)
LB	3	Antonio Benarrivo
RM	16	Roberto Donadoni
CM	11	Demetrio Albertini	(substituted off) 45'
CM	13	Dino Baggio
LM	15	Antonio Conte	(substituted off) 66'
SS	10	Roberto Baggio
CF	19	Daniele Massaro
Substitutions:
LF	20	Giuseppe Signori	(substituted on) 45'
LM	14	Nicola Berti	(substituted on) 66'
Manager:
Arrigo Sacchi

GK	1	Andoni Zubizarreta (c)
RB	2	Albert Ferrer
CB	5	Abelardo	(yellow card) 3'
CB	18	Rafael Alkorta
LB	3	Jorge Otero
DM	20	Miguel Ángel Nadal
DM	12	Sergi		(substituted off) 60'
RM	7	Jon Andoni Goikoetxea
AM	10	José Mari Bakero		(substituted off) 65'
LM	15	José Luis Caminero	(yellow card) 19'
FW	21	Luis Enrique
Substitutions:
FW	19	Julio Salinas		(substituted on) 60'
DF	6	Fernando Hierro		(substituted on) 65'
Manager:
Javier Clemente

=== Netherlands vs Brazil ===
July 9, 1994
2:30 p.m. CDT (UTC–5)

Netherlands	2–3	Brazil
Bergkamp 64'; Winter 76'		Romário 53'; Bebeto 63'; Branco 81'

Cotton Bowl, Dallas
Attendance: 63,500
Referee: Rodrigo Badilla (Costa Rica)

Netherlands	Brazil

GK	1	Ed de Goey
CB	6	Jan Wouters	(yellow card) 89'
SW	4	Ronald Koeman (c)
CB	18	Stan Valckx
RM	20	Aron Winter	(yellow card) 40'
CM	3	Frank Rijkaard		(substituted off) 65'
CM	8	Wim Jonk
LM	5	Rob Witschge
RF	7	Marc Overmars
CF	10	Dennis Bergkamp
LF	19	Peter van Vossen		(substituted off) 54'
Substitutions:
FW	11	Bryan Roy		(substituted on) 54'
MF	9	Ronald de Boer		(substituted on) 65'
Manager:
Dick Advocaat

GK	1	Cláudio Taffarel
RB	2	Jorginho
CB	13	Aldair
CB	15	Márcio Santos
LB	6	Branco		(substituted off) 90'
RM	17	Mazinho		(substituted off) 81'
CM	5	Mauro Silva
CM	8	Dunga (c)	(yellow card) 74'
LM	9	Zinho
FW	7	Bebeto
FW	11	Romário
Substitutions:
RM	10	Raí		(substituted on) 81'
LB	14	Cafu		(substituted on) 90'
Manager:
Carlos Alberto Parreira

=== Bulgaria vs Germany ===
July 10, 1994
12:00 p.m. EDT (UTC–4)

Bulgaria	2–1	Germany
Stoichkov 75'; Letchkov 78'		Matthäus 47' (pen.)

Giants Stadium, East Rutherford
Attendance: 72,000
Referee: José Torres Cadena (Colombia)

Bulgaria	Germany

GK	1	Borislav Mihaylov (c)	(yellow card) 85'
RB	16	Iliyan Kiryakov
CB	3	Trifon Ivanov	(yellow card) 22'
CB	5	Petar Hubchev
LB	4	Tsanko Tsvetanov
DM	6	Zlatko Yankov
CM	9	Yordan Letchkov
CM	20	Krasimir Balakov
RF	7	Emil Kostadinov		(substituted off) 90'
CF	10	Nasko Sirakov
LF	8	Hristo Stoichkov	(yellow card) 82'	(substituted off) 85'
Substitutions:
FW	13	Ivaylo Yordanov		(substituted on) 85'
FW	14	Boncho Genchev		(substituted on) 90'
Manager:
Dimitar Penev

GK	1	Bodo Illgner
CB	5	Thomas Helmer	(yellow card) 14'
CB	6	Guido Buchwald
CB	4	Jürgen Kohler
RWB	14	Thomas Berthold
CM	7	Andreas Möller
CM	10	Lothar Matthäus (c)
CM	8	Thomas Häßler	(yellow card) 49'	(substituted off) 83'
LWB	17	Martin Wagner	(yellow card) 15'	(substituted off) 59'
CF	13	Rudi Völler	(yellow card) 89'
CF	18	Jürgen Klinsmann	(yellow card) 50'
Substitutions:
MF	2	Thomas Strunz		(substituted on) 59'
DF	3	Andreas Brehme		(substituted on) 83'
Manager:
Berti Vogts

=== Romania vs Sweden ===
July 10, 1994
12:30 p.m. PDT (UTC-7)

Romania	2–2 (a.e.t.)	Sweden
Răducioiu 88', 101'		Brolin 78'; K. Andersson 115'
Penalties
Răducioiu (penalty scored); Hagi (penalty scored); Lupescu (penalty scored); Petrescu (penalty missed); Dumitrescu (penalty scored); Belodedici (penalty missed)	4–5	(penalty missed) Mild; (penalty scored) K. Andersson; (penalty scored) Brolin; (penalty scored) Ingesson; (penalty scored) R. Nilsson; (penalty scored) Larsson

Stanford Stadium, Stanford
Attendance: 83,500
Referee: Philip Don (England)

Romania	Sweden

GK	1	Florin Prunea
CB	3	Daniel Prodan
SW	4	Miodrag Belodedici
CB	6	Gheorghe Popescu	(yellow card) 21'
RWB	2	Dan Petrescu
CM	5	Ioan Lupescu
CM	7	Dorinel Munteanu		(substituted off) 84'
LWB	13	Tibor Selymes	(yellow card) 34'
AM	10	Gheorghe Hagi (c)
SS	11	Ilie Dumitrescu
CF	9	Florin Răducioiu
Substitutions:
MF	15	Basarab Panduru	(yellow card) 108'	(substituted on) 84'
Manager:
Anghel Iordănescu

GK	1	Thomas Ravelli
RB	2	Roland Nilsson (c)
CB	3	Patrik Andersson
CB	4	Joachim Björklund		(substituted off) 84'
LB	5	Roger Ljung
RM	11	Tomas Brolin
CM	18	Håkan Mild
CM	6	Stefan Schwarz	(yellow card) 43' (yellow-red card) 101'
LM	8	Klas Ingesson	(yellow card) 7'
CF	10	Martin Dahlin		(substituted off) 107'
CF	19	Kennet Andersson
Substitutions:
CB	14	Pontus Kåmark		(substituted on) 84'
CF	7	Henrik Larsson		(substituted on) 107'
Manager:
Tommy Svensson

== Semifinals ==
=== Bulgaria vs Italy ===
July 13, 1994
4:00 p.m. EDT (UTC–4)

Bulgaria	1–2	Italy
Stoichkov 44' (pen.)		R. Baggio 21', 25'

Giants Stadium, East Rutherford
Attendance: 74,110
Referee: Joël Quiniou (France)

Bulgaria	Italy

GK	1	Borislav Mihaylov (c)
RB	16	Iliyan Kiryakov
CB	3	Trifon Ivanov
CB	5	Petar Hubchev
LB	4	Tsanko Tsvetanov
DM	6	Zlatko Yankov	(yellow card) 83'
CM	9	Yordan Letchkov	(yellow card) 65'
CM	20	Krasimir Balakov
AM	10	Nasko Sirakov
FW	7	Emil Kostadinov	(yellow card) 52'	(substituted off) 72'
FW	8	Hristo Stoichkov		(substituted off) 79'
Substitutions:
FW	13	Ivaylo Yordanov		(substituted on) 72'
MF	14	Boncho Genchev		(substituted on) 79'
Manager:
Dimitar Penev

GK	1	Gianluca Pagliuca
RB	8	Roberto Mussi
CB	4	Alessandro Costacurta	(yellow card) 61'
CB	5	Paolo Maldini (c)
LB	3	Antonio Benarrivo
RM	16	Roberto Donadoni
CM	11	Demetrio Albertini	(yellow card) 80'
CM	13	Dino Baggio		(substituted off) 56'
LM	14	Nicola Berti
SS	10	Roberto Baggio		(substituted off) 71'
CF	18	Pierluigi Casiraghi
Substitutions:
MF	15	Antonio Conte		(substituted on) 56'
FW	20	Giuseppe Signori		(substituted on) 71'
Manager:
Arrigo Sacchi

=== Sweden vs Brazil ===
July 13, 1994
4:30 p.m. PDT (UTC–7)

Sweden	0–1	Brazil
		Romário 80'

Rose Bowl, Pasadena
Attendance: 91,856
Referee: José Torres Cadena (Colombia)

Sweden	Brazil

GK	1	Thomas Ravelli
RB	2	Roland Nilsson
CB	3	Patrik Andersson
CB	4	Joachim Björklund
LB	5	Roger Ljung	(yellow card) 29'
RM	11	Tomas Brolin	(yellow card) 86'
CM	18	Håkan Mild
CM	9	Jonas Thern (c)	(red card) 63'
LM	8	Klas Ingesson
CF	10	Martin Dahlin		(substituted off) 68'
CF	19	Kennet Andersson
Substitutions:
CM	17	Stefan Rehn		(substituted on) 68'
Manager:
Tommy Svensson

GK	1	Cláudio Taffarel
RB	2	Jorginho
CB	13	Aldair
CB	15	Márcio Santos
LB	6	Branco
RM	17	Mazinho		(substituted off) 45'
CM	5	Mauro Silva
CM	8	Dunga (c)
LM	9	Zinho	(yellow card) 3'
FW	7	Bebeto
FW	11	Romário
Substitutions:
RM	10	Raí		(substituted on) 45'
Manager:
Carlos Alberto Parreira

== Match for third place ==
July 16, 1994
12:30 p.m. PDT (UTC–7)

Sweden	4–0	Bulgaria
Brolin 8'; Mild 30'; Larsson 37'; K. Andersson 39'

Rose Bowl, Pasadena
Attendance: 91,500
Referee: Ali Bujsaim (United Arab Emirates)

Sweden	Bulgaria

GK	1	Thomas Ravelli
RB	2	Roland Nilsson (c)
CB	3	Patrik Andersson
CB	4	Joachim Björklund
LB	14	Pontus Kåmark
RM	11	Tomas Brolin
CM	18	Håkan Mild
CM	6	Stefan Schwarz
LM	8	Klas Ingesson
CF	7	Henrik Larsson		(substituted off) 79'
CF	19	Kennet Andersson	(yellow card) 82'
Substitutions:
MF	16	Anders Limpar		(substituted on) 79'
Manager:
Tommy Svensson

GK	1	Borislav Mihaylov (c)		(substituted off) 46'
RB	16	Iliyan Kiryakov
CB	3	Trifon Ivanov		(substituted off) 42'
CB	5	Petar Hubchev
LB	4	Tsanko Tsvetanov
DM	6	Zlatko Yankov	(yellow card) 73'
CM	9	Yordan Letchkov
CM	20	Krasimir Balakov
AM	10	Nasko Sirakov		(substituted off) 46'
FW	7	Emil Kostadinov
FW	8	Hristo Stoichkov
Substitutions:
DF	2	Emil Kremenliev		(substituted on) 42'
GK	12	Plamen Nikolov		(substituted on) 46'
FW	13	Ivaylo Yordanov		(substituted on) 46'
Manager:
Dimitar Penev

== Final ==
July 17, 1994
12:30 p.m. PDT (UTC−7)

Brazil	0–0 (a.e.t.)	Italy
Penalties
Márcio Santos (penalty missed); Romário (penalty scored); Branco (penalty scored); Dunga (penalty scored)	3–2	(penalty missed) Baresi; (penalty scored) Albertini; (penalty scored) Evani; (penalty missed) Massaro; (penalty missed) R. Baggio

Rose Bowl, Pasadena
Attendance: 94,194
Referee: Sándor Puhl (Hungary)

Brazil	Italy

GK	1	Cláudio Taffarel
RB	2	Jorginho		(substituted off) 21'
CB	13	Aldair
CB	15	Márcio Santos
LB	6	Branco
RM	17	Mazinho	(yellow card) 4'
CM	5	Mauro Silva
CM	8	Dunga (c)
LM	9	Zinho		(substituted off) 106'
CF	7	Bebeto
CF	11	Romário
Substitutions:
DF	14	Cafu	(yellow card) 87'	(substituted on) 21'
FW	21	Viola		(substituted on) 106'
Manager:
Carlos Alberto Parreira

GK	1	Gianluca Pagliuca
RB	8	Roberto Mussi		(substituted off) 35'
CB	6	Franco Baresi (c)
CB	5	Paolo Maldini
LB	3	Antonio Benarrivo
RM	14	Nicola Berti
CM	13	Dino Baggio		(substituted off) 95'
CM	11	Demetrio Albertini	(yellow card) 42'
LM	16	Roberto Donadoni
CF	10	Roberto Baggio
CF	19	Daniele Massaro
Substitutions:
DF	2	Luigi Apolloni	(yellow card) 41'	(substituted on) 35'
MF	17	Alberico Evani		(substituted on) 95'
Manager:
Arrigo Sacchi

Officials

- Linesmen:
  - Venancio Zárate (Paraguay)
  - Mohammad Fanaei (Iran)
- Fourth official: Francisco Oscar Lamolina (Argentina)
