= Group F =

Group F may refer to:

- A set of international motor racing regulations used in touring car racing
- One of six or eight groups of four teams competing at the FIFA World Cup
  - 2022 FIFA World Cup Group F
  - 2018 FIFA World Cup Group F
  - 2014 FIFA World Cup Group F
  - 2010 FIFA World Cup Group F
  - 2006 FIFA World Cup Group F
  - 2002 FIFA World Cup Group F
  - 1998 FIFA World Cup Group F
  - 1994 FIFA World Cup Group F
  - 1990 FIFA World Cup Group F
