= BX Brussels =

Belgian football club

- Full name: BX Brussels
- Nicknames: BX, les Panîs (the Panis), Bleid-Molenbeek.
- Founded: 18 March 1986; 40 years ago
- Ground: Stade Communal, Jette, Belgium.
- Chairman: Vincent Kompany
- Manager: Johnny Mikael Gallefoss
- League: Belgian Promotion
- Website: http://www.bxbrussels.com

BX Brussels is a Belgian football club from Brussels. They currently play their first team games at the Communal Stadium in Jette.

== History ==
=== Foundation ===
The club was founded in Bleid on 18 March 1986 under the name FC Bleid by passionate football fans Renato Di Felice, Joel and Thiry Marcel Thiry, Luc Windeshausen and Serge Carnevali, the former becoming the first club president. On 25 June the club affiliated to the Belgian FA, receiving the registration number 9026.

=== Entering the Third Division, and financial problems ===
Joining the third tier of Belgian football at the point when it was expanding to 18 teams per division, Bleid struggled to raise their game to match the competition and for a long time occupied a place in the relegation zone, only escaping due to Racing Péruwelz being forced to forfeit eight games by the Belgian FA in punishment for fielding an ineligible player. The club managed to finish just one point above the also-relegated Tongeren. Adding to a poor season, on 9 March 2010 club officials were forced to concede that the club's financial position was dire and that they were contemplating filing for bankruptcy and winding up the club. Avoiding bankruptcy, the club changed the name to FC Bleid-Gaume in an attempt to appeal to a wider audience.

While the following season suffered none of the financial turbulence of the previous, still results on the pitch were little better as they finished 14th of 18 teams, just four points above the relegation play-offs. While for the 2011–12 the Bleid management were determined not to be content merely fighting for survival, instead their financial woes caught up with them once more, threatening the club's very existence. On 30 October 2011 the entire club board announced the impending bankruptcy of the club and resigned, intending the club to cease activities at the end of the calendar year. On 12 December, however, a take-over was completed by a consortium of French investors led by Gregory Sellier and Maxime Bootz. The new owners of the club advocated an ambitious future for the club, hiring World Cup winner Lionel Charbonnier as manager and announcing that their aim was to reach the Belgian Second Division within three years.

The dreams of the new ownership group were quickly found to be pure fantasy when, despite enlisting the support of celebrities such as Francis Lalanne and M. Pokora as money-spinning crowd attractions the club failed to gain any more financial traction than it had had before the takeover, and once again the club was declared bankrupt, with the club's registration number being put on sale to any club who wished to purchase it and take Bleid-Gaume's place in the third division. After flirting with Promotion D club Wallonia Walhain, the registration number was instead purchased by bottom-tier club R. White Daring Molenbeek under the ownership of former Belgium international Michel De Wolf in an attempt at resurrecting the former glories of the one-time national champion club. Following the merger of the two clubs, the new club moved to Molenbeek. Though it officially kept the name FC Bleid-Gaume, it came to be referred to by the common name FC Bleid-Molenbeek in respect of the new Brussels location of the club. Despite the club's new start, however, on the pitch results once again took a turn for the worse, with the club finally succumbing to relegation back to the fourth-level Promotion league.

=== Kompany Era ===
In March 2013, Manchester City defender Vincent Kompany purchased his hometown club FC Bleid-Molenbeek. Kompany updated the website stating that he was holding a vote for a new name for the club, Kompany also added his sister to the backroom staff to oversee the running of the club. On 11 April 2013, the votes were received, – BX Brussels – is the new name for the club.
