= Ahmed Masbahi =

Moroccan footballer

Personal information
- Date of birth: 17 January 1966 (age 60)
- Place of birth: Meknes, Morocco
- Height: 1.80 m (5 ft 11 in)
- Position: Defender

Senior career*
Years	Team	Apps	(Gls)
- KAC Marrakech

International career
1989–1993	Morocco		
- * Club domestic league appearances and goals

Ahmed Masbahi (born 17 January 1966) is a Moroccan former footballer who played at international level, competing at the 1994 FIFA World Cup.
