= Nacer Abdellah =

Moroccan footballer

Personal information
- Date of birth: 3 March 1966 (age 60)
- Place of birth: Sidi Slimane, Morocco
- Height: 1.78 m (5 ft 10 in)
- Position: Defender

Senior career*
Years	Team	Apps	(Gls)
1983–1987	KV Mechelen	1	(0)
1987	Bornem	28	(5)
1987–1990	Lommel	75	(16)
1990–1993	Cercle Brugge	72	(1)
1993–1994	SV Waregem	14	(0)
1994–1995	CD Ourense	12	(6)
1996–1997	Den Bosch	22	(1)
1997–2000	Telstar	50	(3)
2000–2003	KAC Marrakech		
2003–2004	KV Mechelen	3	(0)

International career
	Morocco	24	(0)
- * Club domestic league appearances and goals

Nacer Abdellah (born 3 March 1966 in Sidi Slimane) is a retired Moroccan football player. Abdellah started his career in Belgium with KV Mechelen, and played most of his career for Belgian teams. He also made 24 appearances for the Morocco, and played at the 1994 FIFA World Cup in the matches against Belgium and Saudi Arabia.

Just before the 1994 World Cup in the U.S., a statement of Nacer Abdellah lead to controversy. Abdellah said that his former teammate at Cercle Brugge, the Belgian Josip Weber wouldn't score during the tournament.
