= 1992–93 Belgian First Division =

90th season of top-tier football in Belgium

Belgian First Division
- Season: 1992–93

R.S.C. Anderlecht won the title of the 1992–93 season.

== Relegated teams ==
Location of teams in Belgian First Division 1992–93

These teams were relegated to the second division at the end of the season:

- KSC Lokeren
- Boom FC

== Final league table ==
Pos	Team	Pld	W	D	L	GF	GA	GD	Pts	Qualification or relegation
1	R.S.C. Anderlecht	34	26	6	2	80	24	+56	58	Qualified for 1993–94 UEFA Champions League
2	Standard Liège	34	18	9	7	69	43	+26	45	Qualified for 1993–94 European Cup Winners' Cup
3	Y.R. K.V. Mechelen	34	18	6	10	53	33	+20	42	Qualified for 1993–94 UEFA Cup
4	K.S.V. Waregem	34	17	8	9	78	45	+33	42	Qualified for 1993–94 UEFA Cup
5	R. Antwerp F.C.	34	17	7	10	61	42	+19	41	Qualified for 1993–94 UEFA Cup
6	Club Brugge	34	16	8	10	49	32	+17	40	
7	R. Charleroi S.C.	34	16	8	10	58	46	+12	40	
8	K.S.K. Beveren	34	15	7	12	47	42	+5	37	
9	K.A.A. Gent	34	12	10	12	51	51	0	34	
10	Lierse S.K.	34	12	7	15	41	51	−10	31	
11	R.W.D. Molenbeek	34	10	11	13	39	45	−6	31	
12	R.F.C. de Liège	34	10	8	16	48	71	−23	28	
13	Cercle Brugge K.S.V.	34	9	10	15	65	73	−8	28	
14	K.F.C. Germinal Ekeren	34	10	7	17	57	67	−10	27	
15	K.R.C. Genk	34	8	11	15	37	50	−13	27	
16	K.F.C. Lommel S.K.	34	9	4	21	42	79	−37	22	
17	K.S.C. Lokeren Oost-Vlaanderen	34	4	12	18	32	58	−26	20	Relegated to Belgian Second Division
18	K. Boom F.C.	34	6	7	21	40	95	−55	19	Relegated to Belgian Second Division

== Results ==
Home \ Away	AND	ANT	BEV	BOO	CER	CLU	CHA	EKE	GNK	GNT	RCL	LIE	LOK	LOM	MEC	MOL	STA	WAR
Anderlecht		2–0	0–0	4–1	3–1	1–0	2–0	2–0	5–0	1–0	3–0	3–0	2–0	4–2	1–0	3–2	2–0	2–5
Antwerp	0–2		3–2	2–3	0–0	2–1	5–3	2–1	4–0	3–1	4–1	2–0	3–1	2–0	4–1	0–4	3–1	3–1
Beveren	1–3	2–0		3–1	1–0	0–0	1–1	2–0	2–1	0–2	0–0	2–0	2–2	0–1	1–0	0–3	1–0	0–2
Boom	1–5	1–1	0–4		2–3	1–2	2–0	3–2	3–3	1–1	4–2	0–0	2–1	0–3	1–1	0–1	2–6	0–2
Cercle Brugge	2–5	2–3	1–4	3–1		3–1	1–4	1–2	2–2	1–1	2–2	5–1	1–1	4–0	0–3	4–0	2–5	3–4
Club Brugge	0–0	1–0	0–0	7–0	1–3		1–0	1–3	4–0	2–0	1–0	3–2	3–1	3–3	2–0	0–0	0–1	1–2
Charleroi	2–1	1–1	0–3	7–4	0–1	1–1		5–1	1–0	1–0	2–1	1–1	2–1	3–0	2–1	1–0	1–1	3–1
Germinal Ekeren	1–1	0–2	4–1	7–0	2–6	0–3	0–2		2–2	0–2	1–2	5–0	3–1	5–1	2–2	3–0	0–0	0–3
Genk	0–1	3–0	0–2	1–2	1–1	0–0	0–3	3–1		3–0	2–0	2–0	1–2	2–0	0–0	2–1	0–1	1–1
Gent	1–1	3–1	0–3	2–2	1–1	2–3	3–1	3–1	1–0		5–0	1–1	2–0	1–0	1–1	1–2	2–1	4–0
Liége	1–6	2–1	1–2	3–0	1–1	1–0	1–3	1–1	1–1	3–1		1–1	3–2	2–1	1–4	4–1	2–3	4–1
Lierse	0–2	1–0	2–0	4–1	2–1	1–2	1–2	3–0	2–1	0–0	0–2		3–0	3–2	2–1	0–0	0–2	3–2
Lokeren	0–2	0–0	2–2	0–0	1–1	0–1	2–2	1–1	0–2	1–2	2–2	0–0		2–1	1–2	1–0	1–4	2–1
Lommel	0–4	0–4	2–1	2–0	2–0	0–2	3–1	1–2	4–2	0–0	3–2	1–6	3–2		1–3	2–4	1–1	2–2
Mechelen	1–2	0–0	3–0	1–0	6–2	2–0	3–1	0–2	2–0	3–2	3–0	0–1	1–0	2–0		2–0	1–0	0–0
Molenbeek	2–2	0–0	0–2	2–1	4–2	1–2	1–1	1–1	1–1	1–1	1–1	1–0	1–1	2–0	1–3		0–0	0–2
Standard Liège	1–1	1–5	3–1	2–1	3–3	1–0	2–0	4–2	1–1	8–4	3–0	4–0	0–0	3–1	3–1	2–1		1–3
Waregem	0–2	1–1	4–1	8–0	4–2	1–1	1–1	5–1	0–0	5–1	6–1	2–1	3–1	5–0	0–1	0–1	1–1	

Legend: Blue = home team win; Yellow = draw; Red = away team win.

== Top goal scorers ==
Scorer	Goals	Team
(Croatia) Josip Weber	31	Cercle Brugge
(Netherlands) Hendrie Krüzen	23	Waregem
(Federal Republic of Yugoslavia) Nebojša Malbaša	23	Charleroi
(Belgium) Marc Wilmots	22	Standard Liège
(Belgium) Luc Nilis	19	Anderlecht
(Belgium) Francis Severyns	19	Antwerp
(Australia) Aurelio Vidmar	18	Waregem
(Nigeria) Victor Ikpeba	17	Liégeois
(Belgium) Alexandre Czerniatynski	16	Antwerp

== Attendances ==
#	Club	Average
1	Anderlecht	16,471
2	Standard	13,618
3	Charleroi	11,176
4	Club Brugge	10,706
5	Mechelen	8,647
6	Gent	7,665
7	Waregem	7,324
8	Liège	6,765
9	Antwerp	6,747
10	Genk	6,735
11	Lommel	6,500
12	Beveren	6,265
13	RWDM	6,059
14	Lierse	5,618
15	Lokeren	3,971
16	Ekeren	3,918
17	Cercle	3,765
18	Boom	3,212
