= Said Dghay =

Moroccan footballer

Personal information
- Date of birth: 14 January 1964 (age 62)
- Position: Goalkeeper

Senior career*
Years	Team	Apps	(Gls)
- Olympique Casablanca

International career
1994	Morocco	2	(0)
- * Club domestic league appearances and goals

Said Dghay (born 14 January 1964) is a Moroccan former footballer who played at international level, competing at the 1994 FIFA World Cup.
