= Néstor Ortiz =

Colombian footballer (born 1968)

Personal information
- Full name: Néstor Ortiz Mena
- Date of birth: September 20, 1968 (age 58)
- Place of birth: Turbo, Colombia
- Position: Defender

Senior career*
Years	Team	Apps	(Gls)
1989–1996	Once Caldas		
1997–1998	Deportes Tolima		
1998–1999	Millonarios		
1999	Deportivo Pasto		
2003	Independiente Santa Fe		
2003–2006	Carabobo FC		
2006–2007	Deportivo Anzoátegui		

International career
1994–1996	Colombia	8	(0)
- * Club domestic league appearances and goals

Nestor Ortiz Mena (born September 20, 1968) is a former Colombian football player who played defense.

He played much of his career for Once Caldas. He was a member of the Colombia national football team that participated in the 1994 FIFA World Cup.
