= Yassir Al-Taifi =

Saudi Arabian footballer

Personal information
- Date of birth: 10 May 1971 (age 55)
- Place of birth: Saudi Arabia
- Position: Left back

Senior career*
Years	Team	Apps	(Gls)
- Al-Riyadh

International career
1994	Saudi Arabia	6	(0)
- * Club domestic league appearances and goals

Yassir Al-Taifi (born 10 May 1971) is a Saudi Arabian football defender who played for Saudi Arabia in the 1994 FIFA World Cup. He also played for Al-Riyadh.
