= Ibrahim Al-Helwah =

Saudi Arabian footballer (born 1972)

Personal information
- Date of birth: 18 August 1972 (age 54)
- Place of birth: Saudi Arabia
- Height: 1.79 m (5 ft 10 in)
- Position: Goalkeeper

Senior career*
Years	Team	Apps	(Gls)
1989–1997	Al-Riyadh SC		
1997–1999	Al-Shabab		

International career
1992–1995	Saudi Arabia		
- * Club domestic league appearances and goals

Ibrahim Al-Helwah (Arabic: إبراهيم الحلوة; born 18 August 1972) is a Saudi Arabian former football goalkeeper who played for Saudi Arabia in the 1994 FIFA World Cup. He also played for Al-Riyadh.
