= Zakaria Alaoui =

Moroccan footballer

Zakaria Allaoui El-Achraf
Personal information
- Date of birth: 17 June 1966 (age 60)
- Place of birth: Marrakesh, Morocco
- Position: Goalkeeper

International career
Years	Team	Apps	(Gls)
- Morocco

Zakaria Allaoui El-Achraf (Arabic: زكرياء علوي) (born 17 June 1966 in Marrakesh) is a retired Moroccan football goalkeeper.

He spent most of his career with Kawkab Marrakech, playing for the club between 1983 and 1997. Between 1998 and 2000, he played for French clubs Tours FC, SO Châtellerault and Paris FC, before finishing his career. Between 2005 and 2007, he was the goalkeeping coach for French club Troyes.

He played for the Moroccan national team in the first half of the 1990s and also made two appearances at the 1994 FIFA World Cup finals in the United States.
