= Talal Jebreen =

Saudi Arabian footballer

Personal information
- Date of birth: 25 September 1973 (age 53)
- Place of birth: Saudi Arabia
- Height: 1.73 m (5 ft 8 in)
- Position: Midfielder

Senior career*
Years	Team	Apps	(Gls)
- Al-Riyadh

International career
1994	Saudi Arabia	5	(0)
- * Club domestic league appearances and goals

Talal Jebreen (born 25 September 1973) is a Saudi Arabian football midfielder who played for Saudi Arabia in the 1994 FIFA World Cup. He also played for Al-Riyadh.
