= Abdellah Blinda =

Moroccan footballer/manager and handball player

Abdellah El Ajri
Personal information
- Full name: Abdellah El Ajri
- Date of birth: September 25, 1951
- Place of birth: Morocco
- Date of death: March 17, 2010 (aged 58)
- Place of death: Rabat, Morocco

Senior career*
Years	Team	Apps	(Gls)
–1973	FUS Rabat		

International career
–1973	Morocco	6	(?)

Managerial career
- –: FUS Rabat
- –: Raja Casablanca
- 1981: Morocco U20
- 1990: Morocco
- 1993–1994: Morocco
- * Club domestic league appearances and goals

Abdellah El Ajri (Arabic: عبد الله بليندة; September 25, 1951 – March 17, 2010) was a Moroccan football player and manager and a handball player.

== Career ==
Abdellah El Ajri was firstly a handball player before he started playing football. He played for the Morocco national football team, making six appearances, and the Morocco men's national handball team at the same time.

As a football Player, he was illustrated with FUS Rabat especially when he scored two goals in the final of 1973 Moroccan Throne Cup against Ittihad Khemisset (3-2).

As a manager, El Ajri managed several clubs in Morocco and abroad like Raja Casablanca, FUS Rabat and Baniyas SC. He also managed the Morocco national under-20 football team, senior Morocco national football team in 1994 FIFA World Cup and the Morocco local national team in 2008.

On March 17, 2010, El Ajri died in the morning after suffering a heart attack in Rabat. He was age 59.
