= Smahi Triki =

Moroccan footballer

Personal information
- Full name: Ismaël Triki
- Date of birth: August 1, 1967 (age 59)
- Place of birth: Zenata, Morocco
- Height: 1.83 m (6 ft 0 in)
- Position: Defender

Senior career*
Years	Team	Apps	(Gls)
1986–1993	Bastia	128	(3)
1993–1996	Châteauroux	46	(0)
1996–1998	Lausanne-Sport	20	(1)
1998–1999	Lorient	17	(0)
1999–2000	Al Nasr		

International career
1994–1999	Morocco	21	(0)
- * Club domestic league appearances and goals

Ismaël "Smahi" Triki (Arabic: اسماعيل سماحي تريكي; born August 1, 1967, in Zenata) is a Moroccan former professional footballer who played as a defender. He represented his country at the 1994 World Cup and the 1998 World Cup. During his career he had spells at numerous French and Swiss clubs such as FC Lorient and Lausanne Sports.
