= Michel De Wolf =

Belgian football coach and former player

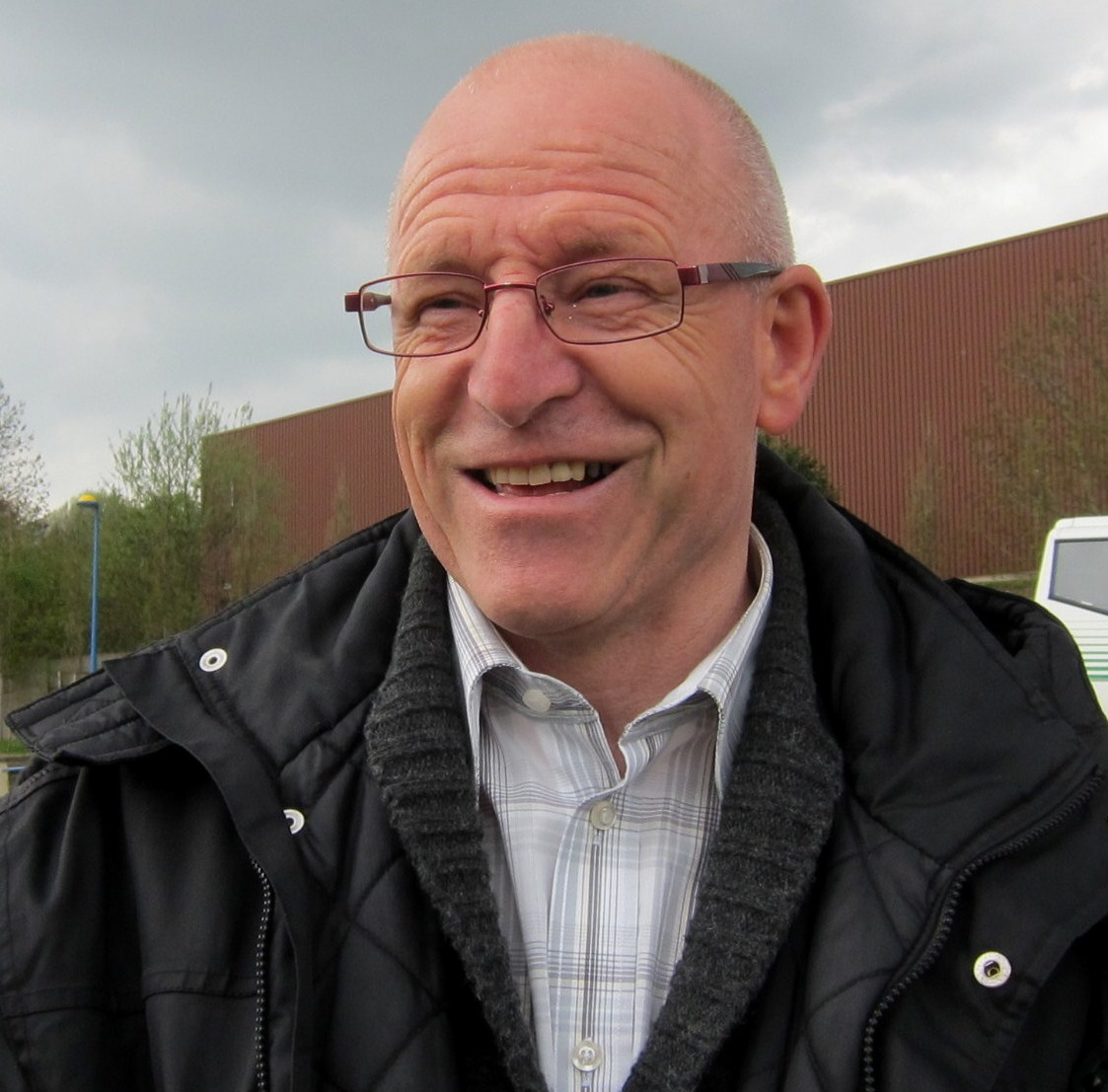
- De Wolf in 2013

Personal information
- Full name: Michel Jean De Wolf
- Date of birth: 19 January 1958 (age 68)
- Place of birth: Nivelles, Belgium
- Height: 1.71 m (5 ft 7 in)
- Position: Left back

Youth career
- Clabecq
- 1972–1977: Molenbeek

Senior career*
Years	Team	Apps	(Gls)
1977–1983	Molenbeek	175	(1)
1983–1988	Gent	150	(3)
1988–1990	Kortrijk	67	(2)
1990–1994	Anderlecht	109	(3)
1994–1995	Marseille	39	(0)
Total		540	(9)

International career
1980–1994	Belgium	42	(1)

Managerial career
- 1996–1998: Avenir Lembeek
- 1998–1999: Grimbergen (youth)
- 1998–1999: Kortrijk
- 2002–2003: Gabon
- 2004–2005: CS Nivellois
- 2009: Charleroi (assistant)
- 2011: FC Brussels
- 2012: BX Brussels
- 2012–2014: BX Brussels (sporting director)
- 2017: Tubize (assistant)
- 2019–2023: Union SG (youth coordinator)
- * Club domestic league appearances and goals

Michel Jean De Wolf (born 19 January 1958) is a Belgian football coach and retired player who played as a left back.

== Club career ==
De Wolf was born in Nivelles, Walloon Brabant. During his career in his homeland, he played, always as first-choice safe for one season out of 17, for R.W.D. Molenbeek, K.A.A. Gent (winning the 1984 Belgian Cup), K.V. Kortrijk and R.S.C. Anderlecht. He arrived at the age of 32, winning three leagues).

In the 1994 summer, 36-year-old De Wolf moved abroad, signing with Olympique de Marseille of Ligue 2 – the French club had just been relegated due to a match-fixing scandal – playing in more than 40 official games in one sole season after which he retired from professional football, still going on to appear for K.F.C. Avenir Lembeek and KSC Grimbergen at amateur level (and as player-coach).

== International career ==
De Wolf was capped 42 times for the Belgium national team, his debut coming in 1980, and appeared at three FIFA World Cups: he played two matches in the 1986 edition, four in 1990 – scoring from 35 meters in the Diables Rouges' 2–0 group stage win against South Korea – and another four (at 36) in 1994.

De Wolf was also selected for UEFA Euro 1984, in France.

== Honours ==
Gent

- Belgian Cup: 1984

Anderlecht

- Belgian First Division: 1990–91, 1992–93, 1993–94
- Belgian Cup: 1994
- Belgian Super Cup: 1991, 1993

Marseille

- Ligue 2: 1994–95

Belgium

- FIFA World Cup: fourth place 1986

Individual

- Best Gent Player of the Season: 1985–86, 1986–87
