= Fahad Al-Ghesheyan =

Saudi Arabian footballer

Personal information
- Full name: Fahad Saleh Al-Ghesheyan
- Date of birth: August 1, 1973 (age 53)
- Place of birth: Saudi Arabia
- Height: 1.76 m (5 ft 9 1/2 in)
- Position: Striker

Senior career*
Years	Team	Apps	(Gls)
1992–1999	Al-Hilal		
1999	→ AZ Alkmaar (loan)	9	(0)
2000	Al-Nassr		

International career
1992–1995	Saudi Arabia	33	(4)
- * Club domestic league appearances and goals

Fahad Saleh Al-Ghesheyan (Arabic: فهد صالح الغشيان) (born August 1, 1973) is a former Saudi Arabian football (soccer) player who participated in the 1994 FIFA World Cup, scoring one goal against Sweden in the Round of 16. Al-Ghesheyan played for Al-Hilal at the time.

Fahad Al-Ghesheyan is also known as the first Saudi player to play in Europe when he moved to AZ Alkmaar in the Netherlands. AZ's manager at that time was Willem van Hanegem, who previously managed Al-Hilal. He had been impressed by Al-Ghesyan back in Hilal. Al-Ghesheyan was known to be a right winger with good dribbling skills but a lack of professionalism and consistency.

Al-Ghesheyan first came into the spotlight when he was part of Saudi Arabia's Asian Youth Cup qualifiers, where he guided the Saudi team to qualification. He was the main star player in the match between Saudi Arabia vs Brazil in that FIFA World Youth Cup where he was too much dominating player and singly took over the momentum of the game. Brazilians were not able to control his pace and ball-control and it was because of him that Saudi Arabia totally dominated over Brazil in the Mid-Field and many counter-attacks.

Being on top of his game, he tried to break into the senior team back in 1994 but his path was blocked by a Saudi side then rich in prolific attacking players, like Majid Abdullah, Sami Al Jabir, Fahad Al Mahalel and Saeed Owairan. Being a winger, the coaches rarely gave him a chance to play. He was only introduced in the second half when Saudi were already two goals behind Sweden – even though he managed to get the score to 2–1 while missing another close chance to make it 2–2 before Sweden finally finished the game off at 3–1.

Somewhere down the line, he fell out with his club's management. To his astonishment, he was sold to Al Naser, who was Hilal's derby rivals in Riyadh. Hilal fans could not believe that their best player had just left and joined Naser, and he was upset that after he left he only played a few games for Naser, and soon quit the game out of frustration of not being able to play for his boyhood club Hilal. He retired when he was around 30 years old.
