= Josip Weber =

Belgian footballer (1964–2017)

- Weber with Anderlecht in 1994

Personal information
- Full name: Josip Veber / Weber
- Date of birth: 16 November 1964
- Place of birth: Slavonski Brod, SR Croatia, Yugoslavia
- Date of death: 8 November 2017 (aged 52)
- Place of death: Slavonski Brod, Croatia
- Height: 1.83 m (6 ft 0 in)
- Position: Striker

Senior career*
Years	Team	Apps	(Gls)
1981–1982	Borac Podvinje		
1982–1985	BSK Slavonski Brod	240	(130)
1985–1987	Hajduk Split	17	(2)
1987–1988	Dinamo Vinkovci	29	(11)
1988–1994	Cercle Brugge	197	(135)
1994–1997	Anderlecht	25	(16)
Total		515	(294)

International career
1992	Croatia	3	(1)
1994	Belgium	8	(6)
- * Club domestic league appearances and goals

Josip Weber, nicknamed Joske, (born Josip Veber; 16 November 1964 – 8 November 2017) was a professional footballer who played as a forward. He represented Croatia and Belgium at international level.

== Club career ==
Weber began his senior career in Yugoslavia with lower league side NK Borac Podvinje. He then joined BSK Slavonski Brod where he played 3 seasons before moving to HNK Hajduk Split of the Yugoslav First League in 1985. He spent 2 seasons in Split, winning the 1987 Yugoslav Cup. He also played for Yugoslav side NK Dinamo Vinkovci. He then moved to Belgium where he played several seasons for Cercle Brugge. There he proved to be a prolific goalscorer, becoming Belgium's top scorer several consecutive seasons without any contention despite Cercle Brugge only being an average team in the league at the time. Eventually he did join RSC Anderlecht (which was Belgium's top team at the time) and looked like he was headed for a brilliant few years. Unfortunately he got sidelined by a serious knee injury and never got to fulfil his clearly great potential with RSC Anderlecht, one of the few glimpses he was able to show was a strong performance in the Champions League match against Hungarian team Ferencvaros.

== International career ==
In his international career, Weber became notable as one of the last footballers who played for national teams of two countries after being granted permission through clear connection shown from his family members. In July 1992, he started his international career with the Croatia national team during their Australian tour, where he appeared in all three of their friendly matches against the Australia national team and also managed to score Croatia's only goal during the tour as he scored in the second match, which they lost 3–1. The other two matches ended with a 1–0 win for Australia and a goalless draw respectively. After that, he never played for Croatia again.

During the 1993–94 season, Weber took the job as a Belgium international team striker. Belgium national team (he was allowed to play for Belgium because his grandfather was originally from Belgium and because the previous matches for Croatia were all friendlies that were not under FIFA. Croatia only joined FIFA and UEFA in 1993). He made his debut for Belgium on 3 June 1994 in their friendly match against Zambia, which was highly successful as he managed to score five goals in a 9–0 win.

He was also a regular member of the Belgian team at the 1994 FIFA World Cup in the United States and played in all of their four matches at the tournament, starting three of them. He nevertheless did not manage to score any goals before Belgium was eliminated by Germany in the round of 16. In minute 63 of the game, he was brought down in the penalty area by Thomas Helmer, but referee Kurt Röthlisberger did not grant the penalty that could have led to a 3–2 score and a red card for the defender.

He won a total of eight international caps and scored six goals for Belgium, all in 1994. Five of his goals were scored in a 9-0 Belgian victory over Zambia. His final international was an October 1994 European Championship qualification match away against Denmark.

== Death ==
Weber died on 8 November 2017 in Slavonski Brod, Croatia from prostate cancer.

== Career statistics ==
=== International ===
Appearances and goals by national team and year
National team	Year	Apps	Goals
Croatia	1992	3	1
Croatia	Total	3	1
Belgium	1994	8	6
Belgium	Total	8	6
Total		11	7

- Weber's team's score listed first, score column indicates score after each Weber goal.

International goals by Josip Weber
No.	Team	Date	Venue	Opponent	Score	Result	Competition	Ref
1	Croatia	8 July 1992	Hindmarsh Stadium, Hindmarsh, Australia	Australia	1–3	1–3	Friendly	
2	Belgium	4 June 1994	Stade du Heysel, Brussels, Belgium	Zambia	1–0	9–0	Friendly	
3	Belgium	4 June 1994	Stade du Heysel, Brussels, Belgium	Zambia	2–0	9–0	Friendly	
4	Belgium	4 June 1994	Stade du Heysel, Brussels, Belgium	Zambia	6–0	9–0	Friendly	
5	Belgium	4 June 1994	Stade du Heysel, Brussels, Belgium	Zambia	7–0	9–0	Friendly	
6	Belgium	4 June 1994	Stade du Heysel, Brussels, Belgium	Zambia	9–0	9–0	Friendly	
7	Belgium	8 June 1994	Stade du Heysel, Brussels, Belgium	Hungary	1–0	3–1	Friendly	

== Honours ==
Hajduk Split

- Yugoslav Cup: 1986–87

Anderlecht

- Belgian First Division: 1994–95
- Belgian Super Cup: 1995

Individual

- Belgian First Division top scorer: 1991–92 (26 goals), 1992–93 (31 goals), 1993–94 (31 goals)
