= Messi's World Cup: The Rise of a Legend =

American documentary television series

- Promotional poster showing Lionel Messi with the FIFA World Cup Trophy
- Genre: Biographical; Docudrama
- Starring: Lionel Messi
- Original languages: English; Spanish
- No. of seasons: 1
- No. of episodes: 4

Production
- Executive producers: Brian Carmody; Juan Camilo Cruz; Patrick Milling Smith; Tim Pastore; Matt Renner; Jenna Millman
- Producer
- Production locations: Qatar; Argentina; France
- Running time: 43–49 minutes
- Production companies: SMUGGLER Entertainment; Pegsa Group

Original release
- Network: Apple TV+
- Release: 21 February 2024

Messi's World Cup: The Rise of a Legend is a biographical documentary series produced in a collaboration between Apple TV+, SMUGGLER Entertainment and Pegsa Group. The series follows Lionel Messi's triumphant career, his overall impact on football and shows his journey of highs and lows with the Argentina national football team across five World Cups, culminating with his fairytale ending of winning the 2022 FIFA World Cup.

== Cast ==
- Lionel Messi
- Ángel Di María
- Rodrigo De Paul
- Enzo Fernández
- Emiliano Martínez
- Sergio Agüero
- Lionel Scaloni
- Andrés Cantor
- Gary Lineker

== Episodes ==
No. in series	Title	Featured matches	Directed by	Written by	Original release date
1	"The Last Cup"	Argentina 1–2 Saudi Arabia	Unknown	Unknown	21 February 2024
Having been on a 36-match unbeaten streak since 2019, the reigning champions of the Copa América and the CONMEBOL–UEFA Cup of Champions get the most dream-shattering start to the World Cup. Messi reflects on his career start with FC Barcelona and his first World Cup goal with Argentina at the 2006 FIFA World Cup.
2	"We Can Dream Again"	Argentina 2–0 Mexico; Poland 0–2 Argentina; Argentina 2–1 Australia	Unknown	Unknown	21 February 2024
Messi remembers his time with Diego Maradona as Argentina prepare for a do-or-die clash against rivals Mexico. Afterwards Argentina get a dominant win against Poland in the final group match and advance as group winners. In the Round of 16 Argentina overcome Australia in another dominant display.
3	"The Weight of a Nation"	Netherlands 2–2 (3–4 pen.) Argentina (Battle of Lusail); Argentina 3–0 Croatia	Unknown	Unknown	21 February 2024
Messi looks back with regret at the 2014 FIFA World Cup final defeat, the subsequent unsuccessful campaigns at the Copa América and talks about all the criticism and abuse he experienced during his career with the national team which led to his early international retirement in 2016 and his comeback. Argentina win a dramatic and hard-fought battle against their historic rivals the Netherlands and advance to the semi-finals where they easily overcome Croatia thanks to Messi brilliance.
4	"Redemption"	Argentina 3–3 (4–2 pen.) France (2022 FIFA World Cup final)	Unknown	Unknown	21 February 2024
With the chance of leading Argentina to World Cup glory and realizing a lifelong dream, Messi takes on Mbappé and France in the most epic and thrilling final in World Cup history.

== Release ==
The series premiered on Apple TV+ on 21 February 2024.

== Reception ==
On IMDb, the docuseries scored a rating of 8.4/10 based on 402 audience reviews. In the first week of its release, it ranked as the 8th most watched TV show worldwide on Apple TV+, and ended the first week in Apple TV+'s Top 10 list in over 50 countries.
