= 2022 FIFA World Cup knockout stage =

The knockout stage of the 2022 FIFA World Cup was the second and final stage of the competition, following the group stage. Played from 3 to 18 December, the knockout stage ended with the final, held at Lusail Stadium in Lusail, Qatar between Argentina and France. The top two teams from each group advanced to the knockout stage to compete in a single-elimination tournament. There were 16 matches in the knockout stage, including a match for third place played between the two losing teams of the semi-finals. Morocco made history by becoming the first African and first Arab nation to reach a FIFA World Cup semi-final, defeating Spain and Portugal in the process.

== Format ==
The knockout stage of the 2022 FIFA World Cup was contested between 16 teams that qualified from the group stage. Matches in the knockout stage were played to a finish. If the score of a match was level at the end of 90 minutes of playing time, extra time was played. If, after two periods of 15 minutes, the scores were still tied, the match was decided by a penalty shoot-out. All times listed are local in Arabia Standard Time (UTC+3).

== Qualified teams ==
The top two placed teams from each of the eight groups qualified for the knockout stage.

Group	Winners	Runners-up
A	Netherlands	Senegal
B	England	United States
C	Argentina	Poland
D	France	Australia
E	Japan	Spain
F	Morocco	Croatia
G	Brazil	Switzerland
H	Portugal	South Korea

== Bracket ==
The tournament bracket is shown below, with bold denoting the winners of each match.

Round of 16
3 December – Al Rayyan (Khalifa)
**Netherlands**	**3**
United States	1
3 December – Al Rayyan (Ahmad bin Ali)
**Argentina**	**2**
Australia	1
5 December – Al Wakrah
Japan	1 (1)
**Croatia (p)**	**1 (3)**
5 December – Doha (974)
**Brazil**	**4**
South Korea	1
4 December – Al Khor
**England**	**3**
Senegal	0
4 December – Doha (Al Thumama)
**France**	**3**
Poland	1
6 December – Al Rayyan (Education City)
**Morocco (p)**	**0 (3)**
Spain	0 (0)
6 December – Lusail
**Portugal**	**6**
Switzerland	1

Quarter-finals
9 December – Lusail
Netherlands	2 (3)
**Argentina (p)**	**2 (4)**
9 December – Al Rayyan (Education City)
**Croatia (p)**	**1 (4)**
Brazil	1 (2)
10 December – Al Khor
England	1
**France**	**2**
10 December – Doha (Al Thumama)
**Morocco**	**1**
Portugal	0

Semi-finals
13 December – Lusail
**Argentina**	**3**
Croatia	0
14 December – Al Khor
**France**	**2**
Morocco	0

Final
18 December – Lusail
**Argentina (p)**	**3 (4)**
France	3 (2)
Match for third place
17 December – Al Rayyan (Khalifa)
**Croatia**	**2**
Morocco	1

== Round of 16 ==
=== Netherlands vs United States ===
The teams had previously met five times, with the Netherlands winning the first four encounters. They most recently met in a June 2015 friendly, with the United States winning 4–3.

Early on in the contest, Christian Pulisic was sent through on goal for the United States but saw his shot saved by the outstretched leg of goalkeeper Andries Noppert. The Netherlands then went in front in the 10th minute, when Memphis Depay received a ball from the right from Denzel Dumfries and finished into the left corner of the net after a sequence of passes. In added time in the first half, Daley Blind made it 2–0 for the Dutch with another low finish, receiving the ball on the right from Dumfries for his second assist of the game. In the 76th minute, the United States pulled a goal back when Haji Wright finished with a deflection from Christian Pulisic's looped cross at the far post. Dumfries sealed the win with a third goal for the Netherlands five minutes later, adding to his two assists with a side-footed finish at the far post from Blind's cross.

3 December 2022
18:00

Netherlands	3–1	United States
Depay 10'; Blind 45+1'; Dumfries 81'		Wright 76'

Khalifa International Stadium, Al Rayyan
Attendance: 44,846
Referee: Wilton Sampaio (Brazil)

Netherlands	United States

GK	23	Andries Noppert
CB	2	Jurriën Timber
CB	4	Virgil van Dijk (c)
CB	5	Nathan Aké		(substituted off) 90+3'
RWB	22	Denzel Dumfries
LWB	17	Daley Blind
CM	15	Marten de Roon		(substituted off) 46'
CM	21	Frenkie de Jong	(yellow card) 87'
AM	14	Davy Klaassen		(substituted off) 46'
CF	8	Cody Gakpo		(substituted off) 90+3'
CF	10	Memphis Depay		(substituted off) 83'
Substitutions:
MF	20	Teun Koopmeiners	(yellow card) 60'	(substituted on) 46'
FW	7	Steven Bergwijn		(substituted on) 46'
MF	25	Xavi Simons		(substituted on) 83'
DF	3	Matthijs de Ligt		(substituted on) 90+3'
FW	19	Wout Weghorst		(substituted on) 90+3'
Manager:
Louis van Gaal

GK	1	Matt Turner
RB	2	Sergiño Dest	(substituted off) 75'
CB	3	Walker Zimmerman
CB	13	Tim Ream
LB	5	Antonee Robinson	(substituted off) 90+2'
DM	4	Tyler Adams (c)
CM	6	Yunus Musah
CM	8	Weston McKennie	(substituted off) 67'
RF	21	Timothy Weah	(substituted off) 67'
CF	9	Jesús Ferreira	(substituted off) 46'
LF	10	Christian Pulisic
Substitutions:
FW	7	Giovanni Reyna	(substituted on) 46'
FW	11	Brenden Aaronson	(substituted on) 67'
FW	19	Haji Wright	(substituted on) 67'
DF	22	DeAndre Yedlin	(substituted on) 75'
FW	16	Jordan Morris	(substituted on) 90+2'
Manager:
Gregg Berhalter

Man of the Match:
Denzel Dumfries (Netherlands)

Assistant referees:
Bruno Boschilia (Brazil)
Bruno Pires (Brazil)
Fourth official:
Andrés Matonte (Uruguay)
Reserve assistant referee:
Nicolás Taran (Uruguay)
Video assistant referee:
Nicolás Gallo (Colombia)
Assistant video assistant referees:
Juan Soto (Venezuela)
Ashley Beecham (Australia)
Mauro Vigliano (Argentina)
Stand-by assistant video assistant referee:
Jerson dos Santos (Angola)

=== Argentina vs Australia ===
The teams had previously met seven times, with Argentina winning five, drawing one, and losing one of these encounters. The sides notably met in the 1994 FIFA World Cup inter-confederation play-off, which Argentina won 2–1 on aggregate. They also faced off in Argentina's 4–2 win at the 2005 FIFA Confederations Cup. Their most recent meeting was in a September 2007 friendly, with Argentina winning 1–0.

On his 1,000th career appearance, Lionel Messi scored his 789th career goal and first in a World Cup knockout stage, giving Argentina the lead in the 35th minute with a low left-footed finish into the left corner. Julián Alvarez made it 2–0 in the 57th minute when he pounced on an error by Australian goalkeeper Mathew Ryan to finish low to the net past the stranded goalkeeper. Australia pulled a goal back in the 77th minute when Craig Goodwin's strike took a huge deflection off Enzo Fernández and ended up in the right corner of the net. Australia had chances to level the match, first when Aziz Behich dribbled past four players before his shot was blocked by Lisandro Martínez, then in added time when Garang Kuol had a shot saved at close range by Argentine goalkeeper Emiliano Martínez. Argentina also spurned several opportunities to add to their advantage, with substitute Lautaro Martínez guilty of squandering multiple chances.

3 December 2022
22:00

Argentina	2–1	Australia
Messi 35'; Alvarez 57'		Fernández 77' (o.g.)

Ahmad bin Ali Stadium, Al Rayyan
Attendance: 45,032
Referee: Szymon Marciniak (Poland)

Argentina	Australia

GK	23	Emiliano Martínez
RB	26	Nahuel Molina	(substituted off) 80'
CB	13	Cristian Romero
CB	19	Nicolás Otamendi
LB	8	Marcos Acuña	(substituted off) 71'
DM	24	Enzo Fernández
CM	7	Rodrigo De Paul
CM	20	Alexis Mac Allister	(substituted off) 80'
RF	9	Julián Alvarez	(substituted off) 71'
CF	10	Lionel Messi (c)
LF	17	Papu Gómez	(substituted off) 50'
Substitutions:
DF	25	Lisandro Martínez	(substituted on) 50'
FW	22	Lautaro Martínez	(substituted on) 71'
DF	3	Nicolás Tagliafico	(substituted on) 71'
MF	14	Exequiel Palacios	(substituted on) 80'
DF	4	Gonzalo Montiel	(substituted on) 80'
Manager:
Lionel Scaloni

GK	1	Mathew Ryan (c)
RB	2	Miloš Degenek	(yellow card) 38'	(substituted off) 71'
CB	19	Harry Souttar
CB	4	Kye Rowles
LB	16	Aziz Behich
RM	7	Mathew Leckie		(substituted off) 71'
CM	26	Keanu Baccus		(substituted off) 58'
CM	13	Aaron Mooy
LM	14	Riley McGree		(substituted off) 58'
CF	15	Mitchell Duke		(substituted off) 71'
CF	22	Jackson Irvine	(yellow card) 15'
Substitutions:
MF	10	Ajdin Hrustic		(substituted on) 58'
FW	23	Craig Goodwin		(substituted on) 58'
FW	21	Garang Kuol		(substituted on) 71'
FW	9	Jamie Maclaren		(substituted on) 71'
DF	5	Fran Karačić		(substituted on) 71'
Manager:
Graham Arnold

Man of the Match:
Lionel Messi (Argentina)

Assistant referees:
Paweł Sokolnicki (Poland)
Tomasz Listkiewicz (Poland)
Fourth official:
Mario Escobar (Guatemala)
Reserve assistant referee:
Karen Díaz Medina (Mexico)
Video assistant referee:
Tomasz Kwiatkowski (Poland)
Assistant video assistant referees:
Marco Fritz (Germany)
Alessandro Giallatini (Italy)
Benoît Millot (France)
Stand-by assistant video assistant referee:
Ciro Carbone (Italy)

=== France vs Poland ===
The teams had met sixteen times prior to this match, with France winning eight and Poland winning three of these encounters, along with five draws. Poland's three victories included the 1982 World Cup match for third place, which they won 3–2. The sides most recently met in a friendly in June 2011, won by France 1–0.

After Olivier Giroud missed a chance for France in front of goal off a cross from Ousmane Dembélé, Poland nearly opened the scoring later in the first half when Piotr Zieliński saw two close-range shots blocked in quick succession. In the 44th minute, Giroud received a pass from Kylian Mbappé before firing low to the right corner of the net to put France into the lead, in the process also breaking the all-time French scoring record with his 52nd goal for the nation. Mbappé made it 2–0 in the 74th minute, when he received the ball on the left just inside the penalty area before firing powerfully into the top left corner of the net. Mbappé got his second of the game in the first minute of added time with a right-footed curling finish past goalkeeper Wojciech Szczęsny. In the final minute of the match, Robert Lewandowski pulled a goal back for Poland to make it 3–1 with a penalty low to the left corner, awarded after a handball by Dayot Upamecano; goalkeeper Hugo Lloris saved Lewandowski's initial attempt, but it was retaken after Lloris was deemed to have left his goal line too early.

4 December 2022
18:00

France	3–1	Poland
Giroud 44'; Mbappé 74', 90+1'		Lewandowski 90+9' (pen.)

Al Thumama Stadium, Doha
Attendance: 40,989
Referee: Jesús Valenzuela (Venezuela)

France	Poland

GK	1	Hugo Lloris (c)
RB	5	Jules Koundé		(substituted off) 90+2'
CB	4	Raphaël Varane
CB	18	Dayot Upamecano
LB	22	Théo Hernandez
CM	8	Aurélien Tchouaméni	(yellow card) 32'	(substituted off) 66'
CM	14	Adrien Rabiot
RW	11	Ousmane Dembélé		(substituted off) 76'
AM	7	Antoine Griezmann
LW	10	Kylian Mbappé
CF	9	Olivier Giroud		(substituted off) 76'
Substitutions:
MF	13	Youssouf Fofana		(substituted on) 66'
FW	20	Kingsley Coman		(substituted on) 76'
FW	26	Marcus Thuram		(substituted on) 76'
DF	3	Axel Disasi		(substituted on) 90+2'
Manager:
Didier Deschamps

GK	1	Wojciech Szczęsny
RB	2	Matty Cash	(yellow card) 88'
CB	15	Kamil Glik
CB	14	Jakub Kiwior		(substituted off) 87'
LB	18	Bartosz Bereszyński	(yellow card) 47'
DM	10	Grzegorz Krychowiak		(substituted off) 71'
CM	20	Piotr Zieliński
CM	19	Sebastian Szymański		(substituted off) 64'
RW	13	Jakub Kamiński		(substituted off) 71'
LW	24	Przemysław Frankowski		(substituted off) 87'
CF	9	Robert Lewandowski (c)
Substitutions:
FW	7	Arkadiusz Milik		(substituted on) 64'
MF	21	Nicola Zalewski		(substituted on) 71'
MF	6	Krystian Bielik		(substituted on) 71'
DF	5	Jan Bednarek		(substituted on) 87'
MF	11	Kamil Grosicki		(substituted on) 87'
Manager:
Czesław Michniewicz

Man of the Match:
Kylian Mbappé (France)

Assistant referees:
Jorge Urrego (Venezuela)
Tulio Moreno (Venezuela)
Fourth official:
Kevin Ortega (Peru)
Reserve assistant referee:
Michael Orué (Peru)
Video assistant referee:
Juan Soto (Venezuela)
Assistant video assistant referees:
Mauro Vigliano (Argentina)
Neuza Back (Brazil)
Julio Bascuñán (Chile)
Stand-by assistant video assistant referee:
Martín Soppi (Uruguay)

=== England vs Senegal ===
The two teams had never met before. It was also the first time England faced an African opposition in the World Cup knockout stage since a 1990 quarter-final win over Cameroon.

After a tight opening period where Senegal's Boulaye Dia saw his strike saved by goalkeeper Jordan Pickford, England went in front in the 38th minute, when Jordan Henderson scored low into the net from twelve yards off a pass from Jude Bellingham on the left. In added time in the first half, reigning World Cup Golden Boot winner Harry Kane made it 2–0 with his first goal of the tournament, firing into the net from the right after a pass from Phil Foden. In the 57th minute, Foden crossed from the left for Bukayo Saka to make it 3–0 with a clipped left-footed finish over Senegal goalkeeper Édouard Mendy.

4 December 2022
22:00

England	3–0	Senegal
Henderson 38'; Kane 45+3'; Saka 57'

Al Bayt Stadium, Al Khor
Attendance: 65,985
Referee: Iván Barton (El Salvador)

England	Senegal

GK	1	Jordan Pickford
RB	2	Kyle Walker
CB	5	John Stones	(substituted off) 76'
CB	6	Harry Maguire
LB	3	Luke Shaw
DM	4	Declan Rice
CM	8	Jordan Henderson	(substituted off) 82'
CM	22	Jude Bellingham	(substituted off) 76'
RF	17	Bukayo Saka	(substituted off) 65'
CF	9	Harry Kane (c)
LF	20	Phil Foden	(substituted off) 65'
Substitutions:
FW	11	Marcus Rashford	(substituted on) 65'
FW	7	Jack Grealish	(substituted on) 65'
MF	19	Mason Mount	(substituted on) 76'
DF	15	Eric Dier	(substituted on) 76'
MF	14	Kalvin Phillips	(substituted on) 82'
Manager:
Gareth Southgate

GK	16	Édouard Mendy
RB	21	Youssouf Sabaly
CB	3	Kalidou Koulibaly (c)	(yellow card) 76'
CB	22	Abdou Diallo
LB	14	Ismail Jakobs		(substituted off) 84'
CM	11	Pathé Ciss		(substituted off) 46'
CM	6	Nampalys Mendy
RW	15	Krépin Diatta		(substituted off) 46'
AM	13	Iliman Ndiaye		(substituted off) 46'
LW	18	Ismaïla Sarr
CF	9	Boulaye Dia		(substituted off) 72'
Substitutions:
MF	17	Pape Matar Sarr		(substituted on) 46'
FW	20	Bamba Dieng		(substituted on) 46'
MF	26	Pape Gueye		(substituted on) 46'
FW	19	Famara Diédhiou		(substituted on) 72'
DF	12	Fodé Ballo-Touré		(substituted on) 84'
Manager:
Aliou Cissé

Man of the Match:
Harry Kane (England)

Assistant referees:
David Morán (El Salvador)
Kathryn Nesbitt (United States)
Fourth official:
Saíd Martínez (Honduras)
Reserve assistant referee:
Helpys Raymundo Feliz (Dominican Republic)
Video assistant referee:
Drew Fischer (Canada)
Assistant video assistant referees:
Armando Villarreal (United States)
Corey Parker (United States)
Nicolás Gallo (Colombia)
Stand-by assistant video assistant referee:
Kyle Atkins (United States)

=== Japan vs Croatia ===
The teams had previously met three times, with a draw and a win for each side. Two of these encounters were in World Cup group stages: Croatia won 1–0 in 1998, and the teams drew 0–0 in 2006. The latter draw was the most recent encounter between the two.

In the 43rd minute, Daizen Maeda scored the opener for Japan with a low finish in the penalty area, after the ball was knocked back to him from the left. Ten minutes into the second half, Ivan Perišić equalised when he headed powerfully to the right corner of the net after a cross from Dejan Lovren on the right. The match saw no further goals scored either in the ninety minutes or during extra time and thus went to a penalty shoot-out. Japan missed three of their four penalties, with all three saved by goalkeeper Dominik Livaković. After Marko Livaja's effort struck the post, Mario Pašalić scored the winning spot kick with a low shot to the left, as Croatia won the shoot-out 3–1. Livaković became the third goalkeeper to make three saves in a World Cup shoot-out, after Ricardo for Portugal in 2006 and his fellow countryman Danijel Subašić in 2018.

5 December 2022
18:00

Japan	1–1 (a.e.t.)	Croatia
Maeda 43'		Perišić 55'
Penalties
Minamino (penalty missed); Mitoma (penalty missed); Asano (penalty scored); Yoshida (penalty missed)	1–3	(penalty scored) Vlašić; (penalty scored) Brozović; (penalty missed) Livaja; (penalty scored) Pašalić

Al Janoub Stadium, Al Wakrah
Attendance: 42,523
Referee: Ismail Elfath (United States)

Japan	Croatia

GK	12	Shūichi Gonda
CB	16	Takehiro Tomiyasu
CB	22	Maya Yoshida (c)
CB	3	Shōgo Taniguchi
RM	14	Junya Itō
CM	6	Wataru Endo
CM	13	Hidemasa Morita	(substituted off) 106'
LM	5	Yūto Nagatomo	(substituted off) 64'
RF	8	Ritsu Dōan	(substituted off) 87'
CF	25	Daizen Maeda	(substituted off) 64'
LF	15	Daichi Kamada	(substituted off) 75'
Substitutions:
MF	9	Kaoru Mitoma	(substituted on) 64'
FW	18	Takuma Asano	(substituted on) 64'
DF	19	Hiroki Sakai	(substituted on) 75'
MF	10	Takumi Minamino	(substituted on) 87'
MF	17	Ao Tanaka	(substituted on) 106'
Manager:
Hajime Moriyasu

GK	1	Dominik Livaković
RB	22	Josip Juranović
CB	6	Dejan Lovren
CB	20	Joško Gvardiol
LB	3	Borna Barišić	(yellow card) 116'
DM	11	Marcelo Brozović
CM	10	Luka Modrić (c)		(substituted off) 99'
CM	8	Mateo Kovačić	(yellow card) 90'	(substituted off) 99'
RF	9	Andrej Kramarić		(substituted off) 68'
CF	16	Bruno Petković		(substituted off) 62'
LF	4	Ivan Perišić		(substituted off) 106'
Substitutions:
FW	17	Ante Budimir		(substituted on) 62'	(substituted off) 106'
MF	15	Mario Pašalić		(substituted on) 68'
MF	13	Nikola Vlašić		(substituted on) 99'
MF	7	Lovro Majer		(substituted on) 99'
FW	14	Marko Livaja			(substituted on) 106'
FW	18	Mislav Oršić		(substituted on) 106'
Manager:
Zlatko Dalić

Man of the Match:
Dominik Livaković (Croatia)

Assistant referees:
Corey Parker (United States)
Kyle Atkins (United States)
Fourth official:
Mustapha Ghorbal (Algeria)
Reserve assistant referee:
Mokrane Gourari (Algeria)
Video assistant referee:
Nicolás Gallo (Colombia)

=== Brazil vs South Korea ===
The teams had previously met seven times, with Brazil winning six and South Korea winning one of these encounters. The most recent meeting was in June 2022, a 5–1 friendly win for Brazil.

Vinícius Júnior opened the scoring for Brazil in the 7th minute, when he converted a side-footed shot to the right of the net past three Korean defenders on the line. Brazil were awarded a penalty six minutes later when Richarlison was fouled just inside the penalty area, which the returning Neymar scored with a low shot to the right corner of the goalkeeper, who didn't move. Richarlison made it 3–0 in the 29th minute when he controlled the ball with his head before receiving the ball back from Thiago Silva and passing into the left corner of the net. Lucas Paquetá got Brazil's fourth goal before half-time in the 36th minute, volleying low into the left corner of the net with his right foot after a cross from Vinícius Júnior on the left. In the second half, South Korea pulled a goal back when Paik Seung-ho finished into the right of the net from thirty yards out. With ten minutes left and leading by three goals, Brazilian goalkeeper Alisson was substituted for third-choice keeper Weverton, making Brazil the first team to ever play 26 different players in a single World Cup.

5 December 2022
22:00

Brazil	4–1	South Korea
Vinícius 7'; Neymar 13' (pen.); Richarlison 29'; Paquetá 36'		Paik Seung-ho 76'

Stadium 974, Doha
Attendance: 43,847
Referee: Clément Turpin (France)

Brazil	South Korea

GK	1	Alisson	(substituted off) 80'
RB	14	Éder Militão	(substituted off) 63'
CB	4	Marquinhos
CB	3	Thiago Silva (c)
LB	2	Danilo	(substituted off) 72'
CM	5	Casemiro
CM	7	Lucas Paquetá
RW	11	Raphinha
AM	10	Neymar	(substituted off) 80'
LW	20	Vinícius Júnior	(substituted off) 72'
CF	9	Richarlison
Substitutions:
DF	13	Dani Alves	(substituted on) 63'
FW	26	Gabriel Martinelli	(substituted on) 72'
DF	24	Bremer	(substituted on) 72'
GK	12	Weverton	(substituted on) 80'
FW	21	Rodrygo	(substituted on) 80'
Manager:
Tite

GK	1	Kim Seung-gyu
RB	15	Kim Moon-hwan
CB	4	Kim Min-jae
CB	19	Kim Young-gwon
LB	3	Kim Jin-su		(substituted off) 46'
RM	10	Lee Jae-sung		(substituted off) 74'
CM	5	Jung Woo-young	(yellow card) 44'	(substituted off) 46'
CM	6	Hwang In-beom		(substituted off) 65'
LM	11	Hwang Hee-chan
CF	9	Cho Gue-sung		(substituted off) 80'
CF	7	Son Heung-min (c)
Substitutions:
DF	14	Hong Chul		(substituted on) 46'
MF	13	Son Jun-ho		(substituted on) 46'
MF	8	Paik Seung-ho		(substituted on) 65'
MF	18	Lee Kang-in		(substituted on) 74'
FW	16	Hwang Ui-jo		(substituted on) 80'
Manager:
(Portugal) Paulo Bento

Man of the Match:
Neymar (Brazil)

Assistant referees:
Nicolas Danos (France)
Cyril Gringore (France)
Fourth official:
Slavko Vinčić (Slovenia)
Reserve assistant referee:
Tomaž Klančnik (Slovenia)
Video assistant referee:
Jérôme Brisard (France)

=== Morocco vs Spain ===
The teams had met in three previous international matches, with two wins for Spain and one draw. Spain won both legs of the 1962 World Cup inter-continental play-off, while the sides' most recent meeting was a 2–2 draw in the 2018 World Cup group stage.

After a goalless 120 minutes that were dominated in possession by Spain but saw few chances created, the match went to a penalty shoot-out. Spain failed to convert any of their three attempts, with goalkeeper Yassine Bounou saving two of them from Sergio Busquets and Carlos Soler, and Pablo Sarabia hitting the post, whilst Morocco scored three out of four, including the winning penalty from Achraf Hakimi via a panenka kick in the middle of the goal, seeing Morocco progress to the World Cup quarter-finals for the first time in history.

Morocco also became the first Arab country to reach the quarter-finals, and just the fourth African nation – after Cameroon in 1990, Senegal in 2002, and Ghana in 2010 – to qualify for the last eight. Additionally, Morocco manager Walid Regragui became the first African and first Arab head coach to progress this far at a World Cup. Spain became just the second team to fail to convert a single attempt in a World Cup penalty shoot-out, after Switzerland lost to Ukraine in 2006 by exactly the same scoreline at the very same phase.

6 December 2022
18:00

Morocco	0–0 (a.e.t.)	Spain
Penalties
Sabiri (penalty scored); Ziyech (penalty scored); Benoun (penalty missed); Hakimi (penalty scored)	3–0	(penalty missed) Sarabia; (penalty missed) Soler; (penalty missed) Busquets

Education City Stadium, Al Rayyan
Attendance: 44,667
Referee: Fernando Rapallini (Argentina)

Morocco	Spain

GK	1	Yassine Bounou
RB	2	Achraf Hakimi
CB	5	Nayef Aguerd		(substituted off) 84'
CB	6	Romain Saïss (c)	(yellow card) 90'
LB	3	Noussair Mazraoui		(substituted off) 82'
DM	4	Sofyan Amrabat
CM	8	Azzedine Ounahi		(substituted off) 120'
CM	15	Selim Amallah		(substituted off) 82'
RF	7	Hakim Ziyech
CF	19	Youssef En-Nesyri		(substituted off) 82'
LF	17	Sofiane Boufal		(substituted off) 66'
Substitutions:
FW	16	Abde Ezzalzouli		(substituted on) 66'
FW	11	Abdelhamid Sabiri		(substituted on) 82'
FW	21	Walid Cheddira		(substituted on) 82'
DF	25	Yahia Attiyat Allah		(substituted on) 82'
DF	18	Jawad El Yamiq		(substituted on) 84'
DF	24	Badr Benoun		(substituted on) 120'
Manager:
Walid Regragui

GK	23	Unai Simón
RB	6	Marcos Llorente
CB	16	Rodri
CB	24	Aymeric Laporte	(yellow card) 77'
LB	18	Jordi Alba		(substituted off) 98'
DM	5	Sergio Busquets (c)
CM	9	Gavi		(substituted off) 63'
CM	26	Pedri
RF	11	Ferran Torres		(substituted off) 75'
CF	10	Marco Asensio		(substituted off) 63'
LF	21	Dani Olmo		(substituted off) 98'
Substitutions:
FW	7	Álvaro Morata		(substituted on) 63'
MF	19	Carlos Soler		(substituted on) 63'
FW	12	Nico Williams		(substituted on) 75'	(substituted off) 118'
DF	14	Alejandro Balde		(substituted on) 98'
FW	25	Ansu Fati		(substituted on) 98'
FW	22	Pablo Sarabia		(substituted on) 118'
Manager:
Luis Enrique

Man of the Match:
Yassine Bounou (Morocco)

Assistant referees:
Juan Pablo Belatti (Argentina)
Diego Bonfá (Argentina)
Fourth official:
Raphael Claus (Brazil)
Reserve assistant referee:
Bruno Pires (Brazil)
Video assistant referee:
Mauro Vigliano (Argentina)

=== Portugal vs Switzerland ===
The teams had met 25 times, with nine wins for Portugal, eleven wins for Switzerland, and five draws. The sides faced off in several editions of World Cup qualification, including 1938, 1970, 1990, 1994, and 2018. Their most recent meeting was in June 2022, with Switzerland winning 1–0 in the 2022–23 UEFA Nations League A.

Captain Cristiano Ronaldo was left out of the starting line-up for Portugal – a first in major tournaments since their UEFA Euro 2008 group stage defeat, also against Switzerland – with Gonçalo Ramos named instead to make his first start.

After Portugal took a 2–0 first-half lead via goals from Ramos and Pepe, Ramos would score a further two efforts – either side of goals by Raphaël Guerreiro (assisted by Ramos) and Swiss defender Manuel Akanji – in the second half to become the first hat-trick scorer of the 2022 World Cup, the first player to score a hat-trick on their debut World Cup start since Miroslav Klose in 2002, and the youngest World Cup hat-trick scorer since Flórián Albert in 1962. A late long-range strike from substitute Rafael Leão concluded a 6–1 Portuguese victory as they reached the quarter-finals for the first time since 2006.

The result equalled Switzerland's 5–0 defeat to West Germany in 1966 as their biggest ever World Cup loss. In getting Portugal's second goal, Pepe became the oldest player to ever score in the World Cup knockout stage, and the second-oldest to have scored at any stage of the World Cup, behind only Roger Milla, who scored the consolation goal in Cameroon's thumping by the opposite scoreline in the 1994 group stage against Russia.

6 December 2022
22:00

Portugal	6–1	Switzerland
Ramos 17', 51', 67'; Pepe 33'; Guerreiro 55'; Leão 90+2'		Akanji 58'

Lusail Stadium, Lusail
Attendance: 83,720
Referee: César Arturo Ramos (Mexico)

Portugal	Switzerland

GK	22	Diogo Costa
RB	2	Diogo Dalot
CB	3	Pepe (c)
CB	4	Rúben Dias
LB	5	Raphaël Guerreiro
DM	14	William Carvalho
CM	25	Otávio	(substituted off) 74'
CM	10	Bernardo Silva	(substituted off) 81'
RF	8	Bruno Fernandes	(substituted off) 87'
CF	26	Gonçalo Ramos	(substituted off) 74'
LF	11	João Félix	(substituted off) 74'
Substitutions:
FW	21	Ricardo Horta	(substituted on) 74'
MF	16	Vitinha	(substituted on) 74'
FW	7	Cristiano Ronaldo	(substituted on) 74'
MF	18	Rúben Neves	(substituted on) 81'
FW	15	Rafael Leão	(substituted on) 87'
Manager:
Fernando Santos

GK	1	Yann Sommer
CB	5	Manuel Akanji
CB	22	Fabian Schär	(yellow card) 43'	(substituted off) 46'
CB	13	Ricardo Rodriguez
DM	10	Granit Xhaka (c)
RM	2	Edimilson Fernandes
CM	15	Djibril Sow		(substituted off) 54'
CM	8	Remo Freuler		(substituted off) 54'
LM	17	Rubén Vargas		(substituted off) 66'
CF	7	Breel Embolo		(substituted off) 89'
CF	23	Xherdan Shaqiri
Substitutions:
DF	18	Eray Cömert	(yellow card) 59'	(substituted on) 46'
MF	6	Denis Zakaria		(substituted on) 54'
FW	9	Haris Seferovic		(substituted on) 54'
FW	19	Noah Okafor		(substituted on) 66'
MF	26	Ardon Jashari		(substituted on) 89'
Manager:
Murat Yakin

Man of the Match:
Gonçalo Ramos (Portugal)

Assistant referees:
Alberto Morín (Mexico)
Miguel Hernández (Mexico)
Fourth official:
István Kovács (Romania)
Reserve assistant referee:
Ovidiu Artene (Romania)
Video assistant referee:
Drew Fischer (Canada)

== Quarter-finals ==
=== Croatia vs Brazil ===
The teams had met on four previous occasions, with three wins for Brazil and one draw. Two of these encounters took place in the World Cup group stage, with Brazil winning both matches: 1–0 in 2006 and 3–1 in 2014.

Brazil created the majority of the game's chances, forcing Croatian keeper Dominik Livaković into eleven saves, the most in a single match at the tournament. Early in the second half, a handball in the Croatian penalty area by Croatian defender Josip Juranović was dismissed by the referee after being deemed accidental. Following a scoreless ninety minutes, Neymar finally claimed the opener just before half-time of extra time with his 77th international goal, bringing him level with Péle as the nation's all-time top scorer; after receiving the ball back from Lucas Paquetá, Neymar rounded Livaković and shot high into the net from the right side of the penalty area. A defensive lapse then cost Brazil their lead, as Bruno Petković equalised for Croatia three minutes from the end; after picking out Mislav Oršić's cross on the left flank, he fired a shot into the corner of the net that took a deflection off the leg of Brazilian defender Marquinhos. This would be Croatia's only shot on target of the game. In the subsequent penalty shoot-out, Croatia scored all four of their attempts, while Brazil's first kicker Rodrygo had his shot saved by Livaković diving to his left, before Marquinhos hit his penalty low against the left post to confirm Brazil's elimination.

Croatia qualified for their second successive World Cup semi-finals and their third ever, while Brazil exited the tournament at the hands of a European team for the fifth consecutive edition; their 2002 World Cup final triumph against Germany remained their last knockout stage win against European opposition. In the same period, Brazil was eliminated at the quarter-finals in all four World Cup tournaments they played away from home, thus excluding a fourth-place finish at the 2014 tournament which they hosted.

9 December 2022
18:00

Croatia	1–1 (a.e.t.)	Brazil
Petković 117'		Neymar 105+1'
Penalties
Vlašić (penalty scored); Majer (penalty scored); Modrić (penalty scored); Oršić (penalty scored)	4–2	(penalty missed) Rodrygo; (penalty scored) Casemiro; (penalty scored) Pedro; (penalty missed) Marquinhos

Education City Stadium, Al Rayyan
Attendance: 43,893
Referee: Michael Oliver (England)

Croatia	Brazil

GK	1	Dominik Livaković
RB	22	Josip Juranović
CB	6	Dejan Lovren
CB	20	Joško Gvardiol
LB	19	Borna Sosa		(substituted off) 110'
DM	11	Marcelo Brozović	(yellow card) 31'	(substituted off) 114'
CM	10	Luka Modrić (c)
CM	8	Mateo Kovačić		(substituted off) 106'
RF	15	Mario Pašalić		(substituted off) 72'
CF	9	Andrej Kramarić		(substituted off) 72'
LF	4	Ivan Perišić
Substitutions:
FW	16	Bruno Petković	(yellow card) 117'	(substituted on) 72'
MF	13	Nikola Vlašić		(substituted on) 72'
MF	7	Lovro Majer		(substituted on) 106'
FW	17	Ante Budimir		(substituted on) 110'
FW	18	Mislav Oršić		(substituted on) 114'
Manager:
Zlatko Dalić

GK	1	Alisson
RB	14	Éder Militão		(substituted off) 106'
CB	4	Marquinhos	(yellow card) 77'
CB	3	Thiago Silva (c)
LB	2	Danilo	(yellow card) 25'
CM	7	Lucas Paquetá		(substituted off) 106'
CM	5	Casemiro	(yellow card) 68'
RW	11	Raphinha		(substituted off) 56'
AM	10	Neymar
LW	20	Vinícius Júnior		(substituted off) 64'
CF	9	Richarlison		(substituted off) 84'
Substitutions:
FW	19	Antony		(substituted on) 56'
FW	21	Rodrygo		(substituted on) 64'
FW	25	Pedro		(substituted on) 84'
DF	6	Alex Sandro		(substituted on) 106'
MF	8	Fred		(substituted on) 106'
Manager:
Tite

Man of the Match:
Dominik Livaković (Croatia)

Assistant referees:
Stuart Burt (England)
Gary Beswick (England)
Fourth official:
Mustapha Ghorbal (Algeria)
Reserve assistant referee:
Abdelhak Etchiali (Algeria)
Video assistant referee:
Pol van Boekel (Netherlands)

=== Netherlands vs Argentina ===
This was the tenth meeting between the teams, continuing a historic rivalry among the two nations. The Netherlands had won four of the previous nine encounters, Argentina had won one, and the remaining four matches were draws. The sides had faced off five previous times in World Cup matches; a 4–0 win for the Dutch in the second group stage in 1974 was replied to with a 3–1 Argentine victory in the 1978 final. The Netherlands then won 2–1 in the 1998 quarter-finals, prior to goalless draws in the 2006 group stage and the 2014 semi-finals, with the Argentines winning the latter meeting 4–2 on penalties.

Nahuel Molina opened the score for Argentina after 35 minutes, when he received a through ball in traffic from Lionel Messi and flicked it low past advancing goalkeeper Andries Noppert. In the 73rd minute, after Marcos Acuña had been fouled in the penalty area by Denzel Dumfries, Messi scored the resulting penalty to the right of the net to double Argentina's advantage. After being subbed on by the Netherlands in the 78th minute, Wout Weghorst pulled a goal back just five minutes later, converting a downward header via a cross on the right from Steven Berghuis. He then scored an equaliser in the eleventh minute of added time, when a late Dutch free kick on the edge of Argentina's penalty area was played by Teun Koopmeiners directly to Weghorst as he stood in a decoy wall, sending the match to extra time. Argentina controlled the majority of the thirty-minute period, which saw Enzo Fernández strike the post in its dying moments, but the sides could ultimately not be separated and thus entered a penalty shoot-out, just as they had in 2014.

In the shoot-out, Argentine goalkeeper Emiliano Martínez saved both of the Netherlands' first two attempts from Virgil van Dijk and Berghuis, as Argentina scored twice to earn a 2–0 advantage. After Fernández missed the chance to send his side through with their fourth penalty, Lautaro Martínez scored Argentina's subsequent spot kick to end the shoot-out 4–3 in their favour and progress to the semi-finals.

There were a number of contested incidents between the sides both during and after the match that garnered much discussion. Players clashed on multiple occasions across the contest, during both regulation and the subsequent shoot-out. Messi was also involved in confrontations with Dutch manager Louis van Gaal and an unwanted encounter with Weghorst during his post-match interview.

In total, the match saw a total of eighteen yellow cards brandished, breaking the World Cup record of sixteen that was set in another Dutch knockout defeat, their infamous round of 16 game against Portugal in 2006. Spanish referee Antonio Mateu Lahoz received criticism for his failure to control the match, with many fans and media outlets considering his yellow cards to be too lenient for some instances that could have seen players sent off, while other incidents were ignored altogether. The amount of yellows issued by Mateu Lahoz was also criticised.

Because of these events, the match has been referred to as the "Battle of Lusail", in reference to the aforementioned 2006 contest between Portugal and the Netherlands that had been dubbed "The Battle of Nuremberg". The match continued the Netherlands' record of not losing a World Cup match since the 2010 World Cup final.

The match was also marred by the death of American sportswriter Grant Wahl after he collapsed near the end of the match while watching in the press box.

9 December 2022
22:00

Netherlands	2–2 (a.e.t.)	Argentina
Weghorst 83', 90+11'		Molina 35'; Messi 73' (pen.)
Penalties
Van Dijk (penalty missed); Berghuis (penalty missed); Koopmeiners (penalty scored); Weghorst (penalty scored); L. de Jong (penalty scored)	3–4	(penalty scored) Messi; (penalty scored) Paredes; (penalty scored) Montiel; (penalty missed) Fernández; (penalty scored) La. Martínez

Lusail Stadium, Lusail
Attendance: 88,235
Referee: Antonio Mateu Lahoz (Spain)

Netherlands	Argentina

GK	23	Andries Noppert
CB	2	Jurriën Timber	(yellow card) 43'
CB	4	Virgil van Dijk (c)
CB	5	Nathan Aké
RWB	22	Denzel Dumfries	(yellow card) PSO (yellow-red card) FT
LWB	17	Daley Blind		(substituted off) 64'
CM	15	Marten de Roon		(substituted off) 46'
CM	21	Frenkie de Jong
AM	8	Cody Gakpo		(substituted off) 113'
CF	10	Memphis Depay	(yellow card) 76'	(substituted off) 78'
CF	7	Steven Bergwijn	(yellow card) AWET	(substituted off) 46'
Substitutions:
MF	11	Steven Berghuis	(yellow card) 88'	(substituted on) 46'
MF	20	Teun Koopmeiners		(substituted on) 46'
FW	9	Luuk de Jong		(substituted on) 64'
FW	19	Wout Weghorst	(yellow card) 45+2'	(substituted on) 78'
FW	12	Noa Lang	(yellow card) FT	(substituted on) 113'
Manager:
Louis van Gaal

GK	23	Emiliano Martínez
CB	13	Cristian Romero	(yellow card) 45'	(substituted off) 78'
CB	19	Nicolás Otamendi	(yellow card) 90+12'
CB	25	Lisandro Martínez	(yellow card) 76'	(substituted off) 112'
RWB	26	Nahuel Molina		(substituted off) 106'
LWB	8	Marcos Acuña	(yellow card) 43'	(substituted off) 78'
CM	7	Rodrigo De Paul		(substituted off) 67'
CM	24	Enzo Fernández
CM	20	Alexis Mac Allister
CF	9	Julián Alvarez		(substituted off) 82'
CF	10	Lionel Messi (c)	(yellow card) 90+10'
Substitutions:
MF	5	Leandro Paredes	(yellow card) 89'	(substituted on) 67'
DF	3	Nicolás Tagliafico		(substituted on) 78'
DF	6	Germán Pezzella	(yellow card) 112'	(substituted on) 78'
FW	22	Lautaro Martínez		(substituted on) 82'
DF	4	Gonzalo Montiel	(yellow card) 109'	(substituted on) 106'
FW	11	Ángel Di María		(substituted on) 112'
Other disciplinary actions:
TS	—	Walter Samuel	(yellow card) 31'
Manager:
Lionel Scaloni			(yellow card) 90'

Man of the Match:
Lionel Messi (Argentina)

Assistant referees:
Pau Cebrián Devís (Spain)
Roberto Díaz Pérez del Palomar (Spain)
Fourth official:
Victor Gomes (South Africa)
Reserve assistant referee:
Kyle Atkins (United States)
Video assistant referee:
Alejandro Hernández Hernández (Spain)

=== Morocco vs Portugal ===
The teams had met twice before, both during the World Cup group stage, with both sides winning one match: Morocco won 3–1 in 1986, while Portugal prevailed 1–0 in 2018.

In the first half, Youssef En-Nesyri would put Morocco in front after 42 minutes when he jumped highest from a Yahia Attiyat Allah cross to head past advancing goalkeeper Diogo Costa and into the empty net, followed by Bruno Fernandes' attempted equalizer just before half-time striking the bar from long range. Portugal subbed on Cristiano Ronaldo in the second half, which saw him equal the record of 196 international caps set by Bader Al-Mutawa. Despite late Portuguese chances from João Félix, Ronaldo and Pepe, and the dismissal of Moroccan defender Walid Cheddira following two yellow cards in quick succession, Morocco would hold on to win 1–0.

With their victory, Morocco became both the first African and first Arab country to reach the World Cup semi-finals, as well as the second Muslim-majority country after Turkey in 2002 to qualify for the last four. This was only the third time a nation from outside Europe and South America reached this stage after the United States in 1930 and South Korea in 2002.

10 December 2022
18:00

Morocco	1–0	Portugal
En-Nesyri 42'

Al Thumama Stadium, Doha
Attendance: 44,198
Referee: Facundo Tello (Argentina)

Morocco	Portugal

GK	1	Yassine Bounou
RB	2	Achraf Hakimi
CB	18	Jawad El Yamiq
CB	6	Romain Saïss (c)		(substituted off) 57'
LB	25	Yahia Attiyat Allah
DM	4	Sofyan Amrabat
CM	8	Azzedine Ounahi
CM	15	Selim Amallah		(substituted off) 65'
RF	7	Hakim Ziyech		(substituted off) 82'
CF	19	Youssef En-Nesyri		(substituted off) 65'
LF	17	Sofiane Boufal		(substituted off) 82'
Substitutions:
DF	20	Achraf Dari	(yellow card) 70'	(substituted on) 57'
FW	21	Walid Cheddira	(yellow card) 90+1' (yellow-red card) 90+3'	(substituted on) 65'
DF	24	Badr Benoun		(substituted on) 65'
MF	14	Zakaria Aboukhlal		(substituted on) 82'
MF	26	Yahya Jabrane		(substituted on) 82'
Manager:
Walid Regragui

GK	22	Diogo Costa
RB	2	Diogo Dalot		(substituted off) 79'
CB	3	Pepe (c)
CB	4	Rúben Dias
LB	5	Raphaël Guerreiro		(substituted off) 51'
DM	18	Rúben Neves		(substituted off) 51'
CM	10	Bernardo Silva
CM	25	Otávio		(substituted off) 69'
RF	8	Bruno Fernandes
CF	26	Gonçalo Ramos		(substituted off) 69'
LF	11	João Félix
Substitutions:
DF	20	João Cancelo		(substituted on) 51'
FW	7	Cristiano Ronaldo		(substituted on) 51'
FW	15	Rafael Leão		(substituted on) 69'
MF	16	Vitinha	(yellow card) 87'	(substituted on) 69'
FW	21	Ricardo Horta		(substituted on) 79'
Manager:
Fernando Santos

Man of the Match:
Yassine Bounou (Morocco)

Assistant referees:
Ezequiel Brailovsky (Argentina)
Gabriel Chade (Argentina)
Fourth official:
Iván Barton (El Salvador)
Reserve assistant referee:
David Morán (El Salvador)
Video assistant referee:
Mauro Vigliano (Argentina)

=== England vs France ===
The teams had previously met 31 times, with 17 wins for England, nine wins for France and five draws. Two of these meetings took place during the World Cup, with England winning on both occasions: they defeated France 2–0 in the 1966 group stage and 3–1 in the 1982 first group stage. The sides most recently met in a friendly in June 2017, with France winning 3–2.

Aurélien Tchouaméni opened the scoring for France in the 17th minute, with a shot from outside the penalty area to the left corner which beat England goalkeeper Jordan Pickford diving down to his right. Several pundits questioned the goal because England's Bukayo Saka had been brought to the ground, allowing France to win possession, in the build-up to the opener. Some claimed it was a clear foul, while others, including British journalists, thought the contact was not clear enough for the VAR to overturn the on-pitch decision. Early in the second half, England were awarded a penalty after Tchouaméni fouled Saka inside the area. Harry Kane scored from the spot against his club teammate Hugo Lloris, shooting to the left, which put Kane level with Wayne Rooney as England's all-time top scorer at 53 goals. Just moments after seeing his volley saved by Pickford, Olivier Giroud, who himself entered the match as France's all-time top scorer, also scored his 53rd international goal twelve minutes from time, with a header to the left of the net after a cross from Antoine Griezmann. In the 84th minute, the VAR awarded England a second penalty after English substitute Mason Mount was seen being pushed over in the area by Théo Hernandez. Kane again took the spot-kick but this time his shot blazed over the bar, as France held on to win 2–1 and progress to the last four, while England were eliminated in the World Cup quarter-finals for a record seventh time.

France became the first reigning world champions to reach the World Cup semi-finals since Brazil in 1998, whom France would beat in that year's final. France's passage to the semi-finals along with Croatia's, the side they defeated in the 2018 final, marked the first time that both teams from a World Cup final reached the last four of the subsequent tournament since Argentina and West Germany in 1990. The referee Wilton Sampaio had received criticism from many England fans, even resulting in the Wikipedia page for the referee as saying that he was called "A Brazilian Cheat"."

10 December 2022
22:00

England	1–2	France
Kane 54' (pen.)		Tchouaméni 17'; Giroud 78'

Al Bayt Stadium, Al Khor
Attendance: 68,895
Referee: Wilton Sampaio (Brazil)

England	France

GK	1	Jordan Pickford
RB	2	Kyle Walker
CB	5	John Stones		(substituted off) 90+8'
CB	6	Harry Maguire	(yellow card) 90'
LB	3	Luke Shaw
DM	4	Declan Rice
CM	8	Jordan Henderson		(substituted off) 79'
CM	22	Jude Bellingham
RF	17	Bukayo Saka		(substituted off) 79'
CF	9	Harry Kane (c)
LF	20	Phil Foden		(substituted off) 85'
Substitutions:
MF	19	Mason Mount		(substituted on) 79'
FW	10	Raheem Sterling		(substituted on) 79'
FW	11	Marcus Rashford		(substituted on) 85'
FW	7	Jack Grealish		(substituted on) 90+8'
Manager:
Gareth Southgate

GK	1	Hugo Lloris (c)
RB	5	Jules Koundé
CB	4	Raphaël Varane
CB	18	Dayot Upamecano
LB	22	Théo Hernandez	(yellow card) 82'
CM	8	Aurélien Tchouaméni
CM	14	Adrien Rabiot
RW	11	Ousmane Dembélé	(yellow card) 46'	(substituted off) 79'
AM	7	Antoine Griezmann	(yellow card) 43'
LW	10	Kylian Mbappé
CF	9	Olivier Giroud
Substitutions:
FW	20	Kingsley Coman		(substituted on) 79'
Manager:
Didier Deschamps

Man of the Match:
Olivier Giroud (France)

Assistant referees:
Bruno Boschilia (Brazil)
Bruno Pires (Brazil)
Fourth official:
Mohammed Abdulla Hassan Mohamed (United Arab Emirates)
Reserve assistant referee:
Mohamed Al-Hammadi (United Arab Emirates)
Video assistant referee:
Nicolás Gallo (Colombia)

== Semi-finals ==
=== Argentina vs Croatia ===
The teams had met five times before, each side winning twice and drawing once. Two of these matches took place in the World Cup group stage: a 1–0 win for Argentina in 1998 was followed by Croatia's 3–0 victory in 2018.

Both sides kept a cautious approach in the match's opening half hour, until Croatian defenders Dejan Lovren and Joško Gvardiol mistakenly let Julián Alvarez pass through the defence in the 32nd minute, leading to goalkeeper Dominik Livaković colliding with Alvarez. Referee Daniele Orsato booked Livaković and awarded a penalty kick to Argentina, which Lionel Messi converted high into the top right corner of the goal. The collision also sparked a feud between Orsato and some Croatia players, causing Mateo Kovačić to be booked and the sending off of assistant coach Mario Mandžukić. In the 39th minute, Alvarez ran through several Croatian defenders and scored Argentina's second goal. In the second half of the match, Croatian coach Zlatko Dalić substituted off five players, including team captain Luka Modrić, in order to boost the attacking ability of the team, but this didn't stop Messi and Alvarez from providing another goal for the Argentinians; in the 69th minute, Messi twisted past Gvardiol on the byline before teeing the ball up to Alvarez in the center, enabling Alvarez to score his second goal. The match ended in a 3–0 victory for Argentina, a reversal of the scoreline from their 2018 encounter.

Messi's goal from the penalty spot was his eleventh at a World Cup, taking him ahead of Gabriel Batistuta as Argentina's most prolific goalscorer in the competition. Messi also drew level with former German midfielder Lothar Matthäus's record of 25 matches played in World Cup finals.

13 December 2022
22:00

Argentina	3–0	Croatia
Messi 34' (pen.); Alvarez 39', 69'

Lusail Stadium, Lusail
Attendance: 88,966
Referee: Daniele Orsato (Italy)

Argentina	Croatia

GK	23	Emiliano Martínez
RB	26	Nahuel Molina		(substituted off) 86'
CB	13	Cristian Romero	(yellow card) 68'
CB	19	Nicolás Otamendi	(yellow card) 71'
LB	3	Nicolás Tagliafico
RM	7	Rodrigo De Paul		(substituted off) 74'
CM	5	Leandro Paredes		(substituted off) 62'
CM	24	Enzo Fernández
LM	20	Alexis Mac Allister		(substituted off) 86'
CF	10	Lionel Messi (c)
CF	9	Julián Alvarez		(substituted off) 74'
Substitutions:
DF	25	Lisandro Martínez		(substituted on) 62'
MF	14	Exequiel Palacios		(substituted on) 74'
FW	21	Paulo Dybala		(substituted on) 74'
FW	15	Ángel Correa		(substituted on) 86'
DF	2	Juan Foyth		(substituted on) 86'
Manager:
Lionel Scaloni

GK	1	Dominik Livaković	(yellow card) 32'
RB	22	Josip Juranović
CB	6	Dejan Lovren
CB	20	Joško Gvardiol
LB	19	Borna Sosa		(substituted off) 46'
DM	11	Marcelo Brozović		(substituted off) 50'
CM	10	Luka Modrić (c)		(substituted off) 81'
CM	8	Mateo Kovačić	(yellow card) 32'
RF	15	Mario Pašalić		(substituted off) 46'
CF	9	Andrej Kramarić		(substituted off) 72'
LF	4	Ivan Perišić
Substitutions:
FW	18	Mislav Oršić		(substituted on) 46'
MF	13	Nikola Vlašić		(substituted on) 46'
FW	16	Bruno Petković		(substituted on) 50'
FW	14	Marko Livaja		(substituted on) 72'
MF	7	Lovro Majer		(substituted on) 81'
Other disciplinary actions:
TS	—	Mario Mandžukić	(red card) 35'
Manager:
Zlatko Dalić

Man of the Match:
Lionel Messi (Argentina)

Assistant referees:
Ciro Carbone (Italy)
Alessandro Giallatini (Italy)
Fourth official:
Mohammed Abdulla Hassan Mohamed (United Arab Emirates)
Reserve assistant referee:
Mohamed Al-Hammadi (United Arab Emirates)
Video assistant referee:
Massimiliano Irrati (Italy)

=== France vs Morocco ===
The teams had previously met seven times, with France winning five matches and the other two being draws. Their most recent encounter was a friendly in 2007, ending in a 2–2 stalemate. This was the first World Cup meeting between the sides. The match marked the first ever World Cup semi-final featuring either an African or Arab country, and just the third time that a team from a confederation outside Europe and South America played at this stage, after the United States in 1930 and South Korea in 2002.

Théo Hernandez would give France an early lead in the fifth minute, netting an acrobatic volley from a tight angle on the left after Kylian Mbappé's shot was diverted into his path. Hernandez's goal, timed at four minutes and 39 seconds, was the fastest in a World Cup semi-final since Vavá netted in the second minute of Brazil's 5–2 win against France in 1958. It was also just the second goal Morocco had conceded at the tournament and the first since the group stage. Olivier Giroud would hit the post for France, before Moroccan captain Romain Saïss was forced to withdraw after 21 minutes, having been a doubt to start the match after going off injured in the quarter-finals. Morocco would then nearly equalise right before half-time, after Jawad El Yamiq saw his overhead kick strike the post and be cleared away. Despite being in possession of the ball for the majority of the contest, Morocco were not rewarded for this pressure, and after Mbappé dribbled into the penalty area in the 79th minute, his ball would find Randal Kolo Muani, who scored his first-ever goal for France with his first touch of the game to double their advantage, having come on as a substitute 44 seconds prior.

France's 2–0 victory set up a final against Argentina, putting them one win away from becoming the first nation to successfully defend the World Cup since Brazil won the 1958 and 1962 editions.

14 December 2022
22:00

France	2–0	Morocco
T. Hernandez 5'; Kolo Muani 79'

Al Bayt Stadium, Al Khor
Attendance: 68,294
Referee: César Arturo Ramos (Mexico)

France	Morocco

GK	1	Hugo Lloris (c)
RB	5	Jules Koundé
CB	4	Raphaël Varane
CB	24	Ibrahima Konaté
LB	22	Théo Hernandez
CM	8	Aurélien Tchouaméni
CM	13	Youssouf Fofana
RW	11	Ousmane Dembélé	(substituted off) 78'
AM	7	Antoine Griezmann
LW	10	Kylian Mbappé
CF	9	Olivier Giroud	(substituted off) 65'
Substitutions:
FW	26	Marcus Thuram	(substituted on) 65'
FW	12	Randal Kolo Muani	(substituted on) 78'
Manager:
Didier Deschamps

GK	1	Yassine Bounou
CB	20	Achraf Dari
CB	6	Romain Saïss (c)		(substituted off) 21'
CB	18	Jawad El Yamiq
RWB	2	Achraf Hakimi
LWB	3	Noussair Mazraoui		(substituted off) 46'
RM	7	Hakim Ziyech
CM	8	Azzedine Ounahi
CM	4	Sofyan Amrabat
LM	17	Sofiane Boufal	(yellow card) 27'	(substituted off) 66'
CF	19	Youssef En-Nesyri		(substituted off) 66'
Substitutions:
MF	15	Selim Amallah		(substituted on) 21'	(substituted off) 78'
DF	25	Yahia Attiyat Allah		(substituted on) 46'
FW	9	Abderrazak Hamdallah		(substituted on) 66'
MF	14	Zakaria Aboukhlal		(substituted on) 66'
FW	16	Abde Ezzalzouli			(substituted on) 78'
Manager:
Walid Regragui

Man of the Match:
Antoine Griezmann (France)

Assistant referees:
Alberto Morín (Mexico)
Miguel Hernández (Mexico)
Fourth official:
Jesús Valenzuela (Venezuela)
Reserve assistant referee:
Jorge Urrego (Venezuela)
Video assistant referee:
Drew Fischer (Canada)

== Match for third place ==
The teams had previously faced each other twice, including their opening game in Group F at this World Cup, which ended 0–0. This marked the second consecutive World Cup where the teams playing in the match for third place also played each other in the group stage, following Belgium vs England in 2018.

Croatia went in front with an early goal, after defender Joško Gvardiol diverted a diving header into the top left corner of the net in the seventh minute, assisted via a headed pass from Ivan Perišić. Croatia's lead would only last two minutes; Morocco's Achraf Dari received the ball after a Hakim Ziyech free kick struck the Croatian wall, and levelled the score in the ninth minute with a close-range header, having been left unmarked in front of the net. However, the Vatreni managed to regain the lead shortly before half-time through Mislav Oršić, who shot a long-range bending strike from just inside the penalty area on the left, hitting the inside of the post before the ball nestled in the back of the net. Although Croatian keeper Dominik Livaković was forced into a smothering save at close range to deny Morocco's Youssef En-Nesyri, the second half saw no further goals scored, handing Croatia a third-place finish at the World Cup for the second time, following the one achieved in 1998.

This was the eleventh consecutive World Cup in which a European team finished third, dating back to 1982. Despite the defeat, a fourth-place finish still signified the best ever World Cup achievement for Morocco and an African team; they won more matches in the 2022 edition than in their first five World Cup appearances combined. Additionally, this achievement also matches the best finish by a team outside of UEFA or CONMEBOL since South Korea in 2002.

17 December 2022
18:00

Croatia	2–1	Morocco
Gvardiol 7'; Oršić 42'		Dari 9'

Khalifa International Stadium, Al Rayyan
Attendance: 44,137
Referee: Abdulrahman Al-Jassim (Qatar)

Croatia	Morocco

GK	1	Dominik Livaković
RB	2	Josip Stanišić
CB	24	Josip Šutalo
CB	20	Joško Gvardiol
LB	4	Ivan Perišić
CM	10	Luka Modrić (c)
CM	8	Mateo Kovačić
RW	7	Lovro Majer	(substituted off) 66'
AM	9	Andrej Kramarić	(substituted off) 61'
LW	18	Mislav Oršić	(substituted off) 90+5'
CF	14	Marko Livaja	(substituted off) 66'
Substitutions:
MF	13	Nikola Vlašić	(substituted on) 61'
FW	16	Bruno Petković	(substituted on) 66'
MF	15	Mario Pašalić	(substituted on) 66'
MF	26	Kristijan Jakić	(substituted on) 90+5'
Manager:
Zlatko Dalić

GK	1	Yassine Bounou
RB	2	Achraf Hakimi
CB	18	Jawad El Yamiq		(substituted off) 66'
CB	20	Achraf Dari		(substituted off) 64'
LB	25	Yahia Attiyat Allah
DM	4	Sofyan Amrabat
CM	23	Bilal El Khannous		(substituted off) 56'
CM	11	Abdelhamid Sabiri		(substituted off) 46'
RF	7	Hakim Ziyech (c)
CF	19	Youssef En-Nesyri
LF	17	Sofiane Boufal		(substituted off) 64'
Substitutions:
MF	13	Ilias Chair		(substituted on) 46'
MF	8	Azzedine Ounahi	(yellow card) 69'	(substituted on) 56'
MF	10	Anass Zaroury		(substituted on) 64'
DF	24	Badr Benoun		(substituted on) 64'
MF	15	Selim Amallah	(yellow card) 84'	(substituted on) 66'
Manager:
Walid Regragui

Man of the Match:
Joško Gvardiol (Croatia)

Assistant referees:
Taleb Al-Marri (Qatar)
Saud Al-Maqaleh (Qatar)
Fourth official:
Raphael Claus (Brazil)
Reserve assistant referee:
Neuza Back (Brazil)
Video assistant referee:
Julio Bascuñán (Chile)

== Final ==
The teams had met on twelve previous occasions, with Argentina winning six matches, France three, and the other three ending in draws. The sides had faced each other three times in the World Cup, with two of these encounters coming in the group stage: Argentina won 1–0 in 1930 (their World Cup debut) and 2–1 in 1978, while their most recent World Cup meeting was France's 4–3 victory in the 2018 round of 16, their first defeat of Argentina since 1986.

Both teams were seeking to win a third World Cup title. France were the first title holders to play in the final since Brazil, whom France defeated as hosts in 1998, and were aiming to become the first nation to retain the World Cup since Brazil's victories in 1958 and 1962. French coach Didier Deschamps was attempting to become the second manager to win multiple World Cup titles, and the first since Vittorio Pozzo in 1934 and 1938 with Italy. Argentina, who had been defeated by Germany in both of their previous two trips to the final (in 1990 and 2014), were looking for a first world title in 36 years, having last won the competition in 1986.

Following a dominant first half that saw Argentina go up 2–0 thanks to a Lionel Messi penalty and a goal from Ángel Di María, they were suddenly caught out late into the second period with two goals in two minutes for France from Kylian Mbappé. After the match headed to extra time, Messi would score his second to regain Argentina's lead, only for Mbappé to again equalise two minutes from time via his second penalty, making him the first player since Geoff Hurst in 1966 to score a hat-trick in a World Cup final. Having scored once in the 2018 final, Mbappé also became the first player to score four World Cup final goals, as well as the first player to reach eight goals in a single World Cup since Ronaldo for winners Brazil in 2002. However, Mbappé failed to emulate Hurst's and Ronaldo's successes; despite him scoring the first attempt for France, they lost 4–2 in the penalty shoot-out after Kingsley Coman and Aurélien Tchouaméni failed to convert their efforts, with Gonzalo Montiel's spot kick sealing Argentina's victory.

Argentina achieved their third world title, surpassing France and Uruguay's totals. They also became the first non-European side to win the title since Brazil in 2002, the previous occasion that the World Cup was held in Asia. With this victory, they became the second South American team to win a World Cup held entirely in Asia, after Brazil in 2002 when it was held in South Korea and Japan. France's loss was their second in a World Cup final, having been defeated by Italy in 2006, a match which was also decided by penalties. Many reporters, pundits and fans regarded the match as the greatest FIFA World Cup final of all time.

Both the tournament and the final itself saw Messi break multiple World Cup records. The match, which was his 26th overall in World Cup finals, saw him surpass Lothar Matthäus as the player with the most appearances in the competition. His goals against France also made him the first player to score in all five rounds of a World Cup since the group stage to round of 16 format was introduced in 1986. Messi was subsequently named the final's official Player of the Match, before being awarded the Golden Ball for best player of the tournament. His five Player of the Match titles in 2022 were the most ever won at a single World Cup by a player since their introduction in 2002, and his Golden Ball award made him the first player to claim the accolade in multiple World Cups, having done so previously in 2014.

18 December 2022
18:00

Argentina	3–3 (a.e.t.)	France
Messi 23' (pen.), 108'; Di María 36'		Mbappé 80' (pen.), 81', 118' (pen.)
Penalties
Messi (penalty scored); Dybala (penalty scored); Paredes (penalty scored); Montiel (penalty scored)	4–2	(penalty scored) Mbappé; (penalty missed) Coman; (penalty missed) Tchouaméni; (penalty scored) Kolo Muani

Lusail Stadium, Lusail
Attendance: 88,966
Referee: Szymon Marciniak (Poland)

Argentina	France

GK	23	Emiliano Martínez	(yellow card) PSO
RB	26	Nahuel Molina		(substituted off) 91'
CB	13	Cristian Romero
CB	19	Nicolás Otamendi
LB	3	Nicolás Tagliafico		(substituted off) 120+1'
DM	24	Enzo Fernández	(yellow card) 45+7'
CM	20	Alexis Mac Allister		(substituted off) 116'
CM	7	Rodrigo De Paul		(substituted off) 102'
RF	10	Lionel Messi (c)
CF	9	Julián Alvarez		(substituted off) 102'
LF	11	Ángel Di María		(substituted off) 64'
Substitutions:
MF	8	Marcos Acuña	(yellow card) 90+8'	(substituted on) 64'
DF	4	Gonzalo Montiel	(yellow card) 116'	(substituted on) 91'
MF	5	Leandro Paredes	(yellow card) 114'	(substituted on) 102'
FW	22	Lautaro Martínez		(substituted on) 102'
DF	6	Germán Pezzella		(substituted on) 116'
FW	21	Paulo Dybala		(substituted on) 120+1'
Manager:
Lionel Scaloni

GK	1	Hugo Lloris (c)
RB	5	Jules Koundé		(substituted off) 120+1'
CB	4	Raphaël Varane		(substituted off) 113'
CB	18	Dayot Upamecano
LB	22	Théo Hernandez		(substituted off) 71'
CM	8	Aurélien Tchouaméni
CM	14	Adrien Rabiot	(yellow card) 55'	(substituted off) 96' (Note: Rabiot suffered a knock to the head in the 94th minute. Therefore, his substitution for Fofana fell under FIFA's "concussion protocol", which allows a player at risk of a concussion to be substituted without taking account either the substitution window nor the amount of players already substituted.)
RW	11	Ousmane Dembélé		(substituted off) 41'
AM	7	Antoine Griezmann		(substituted off) 71'
LW	10	Kylian Mbappé
CF	9	Olivier Giroud	(yellow card) 90+5'	(substituted off) 41'
Substitutions:
FW	12	Randal Kolo Muani		(substituted on) 41'
FW	26	Marcus Thuram	(yellow card) 87'	(substituted on) 41'
FW	20	Kingsley Coman		(substituted on) 71'
MF	25	Eduardo Camavinga		(substituted on) 71'
MF	13	Youssouf Fofana		(substituted on) 96'
DF	24	Ibrahima Konaté		(substituted on) 113'
DF	3	Axel Disasi		(substituted on) 120+1'
Manager:
Didier Deschamps

Man of the Match:
Lionel Messi (Argentina)

Assistant referees:
Paweł Sokolnicki (Poland)
Tomasz Listkiewicz (Poland)
Fourth official:
Ismail Elfath (United States)
Reserve assistant referee:
Kathryn Nesbitt (United States)
Video assistant referee:
Tomasz Kwiatkowski (Poland)
Assistant video assistant referees:
Juan Soto (Venezuela)
Kyle Atkins (United States)
Fernando Guerrero (Mexico)
Stand-by video assistant referee:
Bastian Dankert (Germany)
Stand-by assistant video assistant referee:
Corey Parker (United States)
