= Wout Weghorst =

Dutch footballer (born 1992)

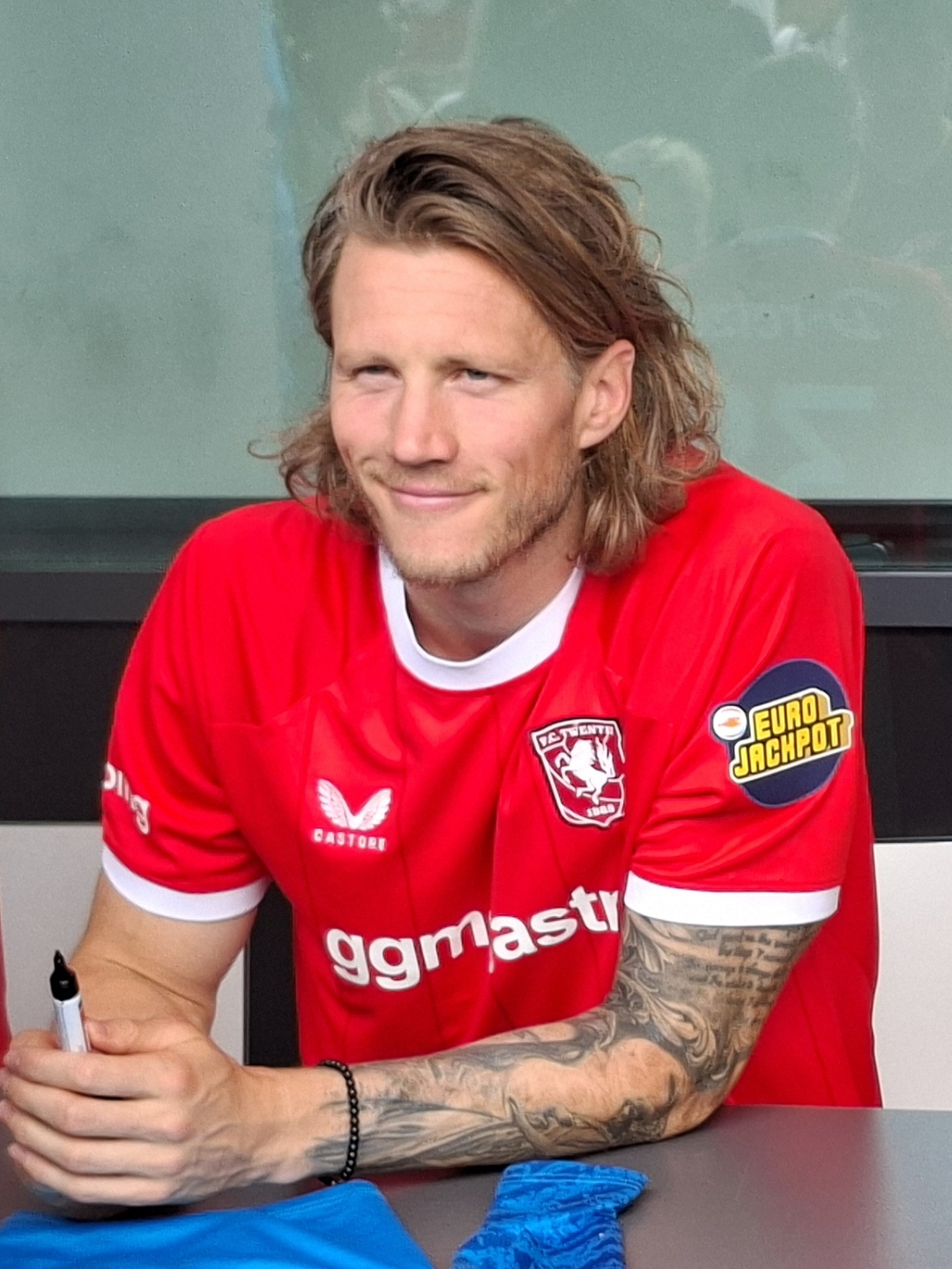
- Weghorst with Twente in 2026

Personal information
- Full name: Wout François Maria Weghorst
- Date of birth: 7 August 1992 (age 34)
- Place of birth: Borne, Netherlands
- Height: 1.97 m (6 ft 6 in)
- Position: Striker

Team information
- Current team: Twente
- Number: 9

Youth career
- NEO
- –2011: DETO
- 2011–2012: Willem II

Senior career*
Years	Team	Apps	(Gls)
2012–2014	Emmen	62	(20)
2014–2016	Heracles	64	(20)
2016–2018	AZ	60	(31)
2018–2022	VfL Wolfsburg	124	(69)
2022–2024	Burnley	22	(2)
2022–2023	→ Beşiktaş (loan)	18	(9)
2023	→ Manchester United (loan)	17	(0)
2023–2024	→ Hoffenheim (loan)	30	(7)
2024–2026	Ajax	51	(18)
2026–	Twente	12	(9)

International career^{‡}
2014	Netherlands U21	1	(1)
2018–	Netherlands	53	(14)
Medal record
Men's football
Representing Netherlands
UEFA European Championship
Bronze medal – third place	2024 Germany	Team
- * Club domestic league appearances and goals as of 8 November 2026 (UTC) ‡ National team caps and goals as of 17:55, 30 June 2026 (UTC)

Wout François Maria Weghorst (born 7 August 1992) is a Dutch professional footballer who plays as a striker for Eredivisie club Twente and the Netherlands national team.

Weghorst began his professional career in the second tier of Dutch football with Emmen. He then played in the Eredivisie with Heracles and AZ, before joining VfL Wolfsburg in 2018. After scoring 70 goals in 144 games for Wolfsburg, he was signed by Burnley in January 2022 for a fee of £12 million. After the club were relegated from the Premier League, Weghorst had loan spells at Turkish club Beşiktaş, fellow English club Manchester United and German club TSG Hoffenheim, before returning to the Netherlands with Ajax in mid-2024.

Weghorst made one appearance for the Netherlands under-21 team in 2014, before making his senior international debut in March 2018. He represented the Netherlands at UEFA Euro 2020, the 2022 FIFA World Cup (where he notably scored two goals in his side's quarter-final match against Argentina), UEFA Euro 2024, and the 2026 FIFA World Cup.

== Club career ==
=== Early career ===
Born in Borne, Overijssel, Weghorst started his career at local clubs RKSV NEO and DETO Twenterand, before joining Eredivisie club Willem II in 2011. Despite having the opportunity to make his way into the first-team, he never broke through, and only featured for the reserve team. He signed for Eerste Divisie club Emmen in 2012, making his debut in a match against Dordrecht on 10 August. Weghorst went on to score his first goal in professional football a month later, in the derby against Veendam, a match that ended in a 2–1 win for Emmen. In his debut season, Weghorst appeared in 28 league matches scoring eight goals. The following season, he scored 13 times from 36 appearances.

After his spell with Emmen, Weghorst signed a contract with Eredivisie club Heracles on a free transfer.

On 9 August 2014, Weghorst made his Eredivisie debut for Heracles, in a 0–3 home loss against AZ in the Polman Stadion. He scored his first Eredivisie goal in his first start – a 2–1 loss against Ajax at the Amsterdam Arena. He ended the 2014–15 Eredivisie season with eight goals from 31 appearances, as Heracles successfully battled relegation.

In his second season, Heracles finished in sixth place and, through the subsequent play-offs, the club qualified for the Europa League qualifying round – the first time in history that the club qualified for an international competition. Weghorst was the team's top goalscorer with twelve goals in the Eredivisie.

=== AZ ===
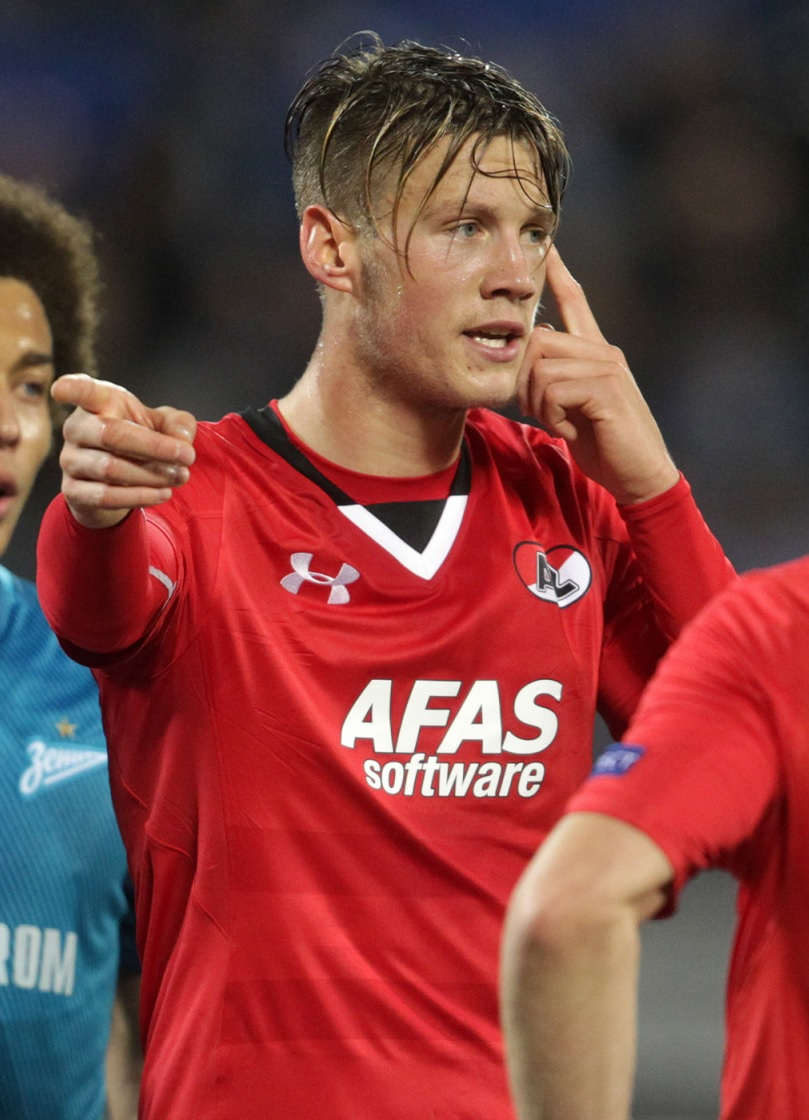
Weghorst playing for AZ in 2016

After his successful season with Heracles, Weghorst signed a four-year contract with Alkmaar-based club AZ in July 2016, with the option for an extra year.

On 7 August, Weghorst marked his debut for AZ with a goal in a 2–2 draw with Heerenveen. On 24 October, he scored his first European goal in a 1–0 UEFA Europa League group win against Irish team Dundalk. On 2 February 2017, he converted the winning kick of the 3–2 penalty shootout win against second division club Cambuur in the KNVB semi-final. On 30 April, he started at centre forward in the 2017 KNVB Cup Final, where AZ were beaten 2–0 by Vitesse at the De Kuip stadium in Rotterdam.

He ended his first season in Alkmaar with 18 goals from 49 appearances in all competitions.

Ahead of the 2017–18 Eredivisie season, Weghorst was appointed vice-captain to Ron Vlaar. He finished the season as the joint-third top scorer in the Eredivisie with 18 goals, tied with Steven Berghuis, and trailing only Alireza Jahanbakhsh and Bjørn Johnsen, who scored 21 and 19 goals respectively. He also recorded nine goals in six KNVB Cup matches, scoring in every round en route to the final, where AZ were beaten for the second consecutive season, this time by Feyenoord.

=== VfL Wolfsburg ===
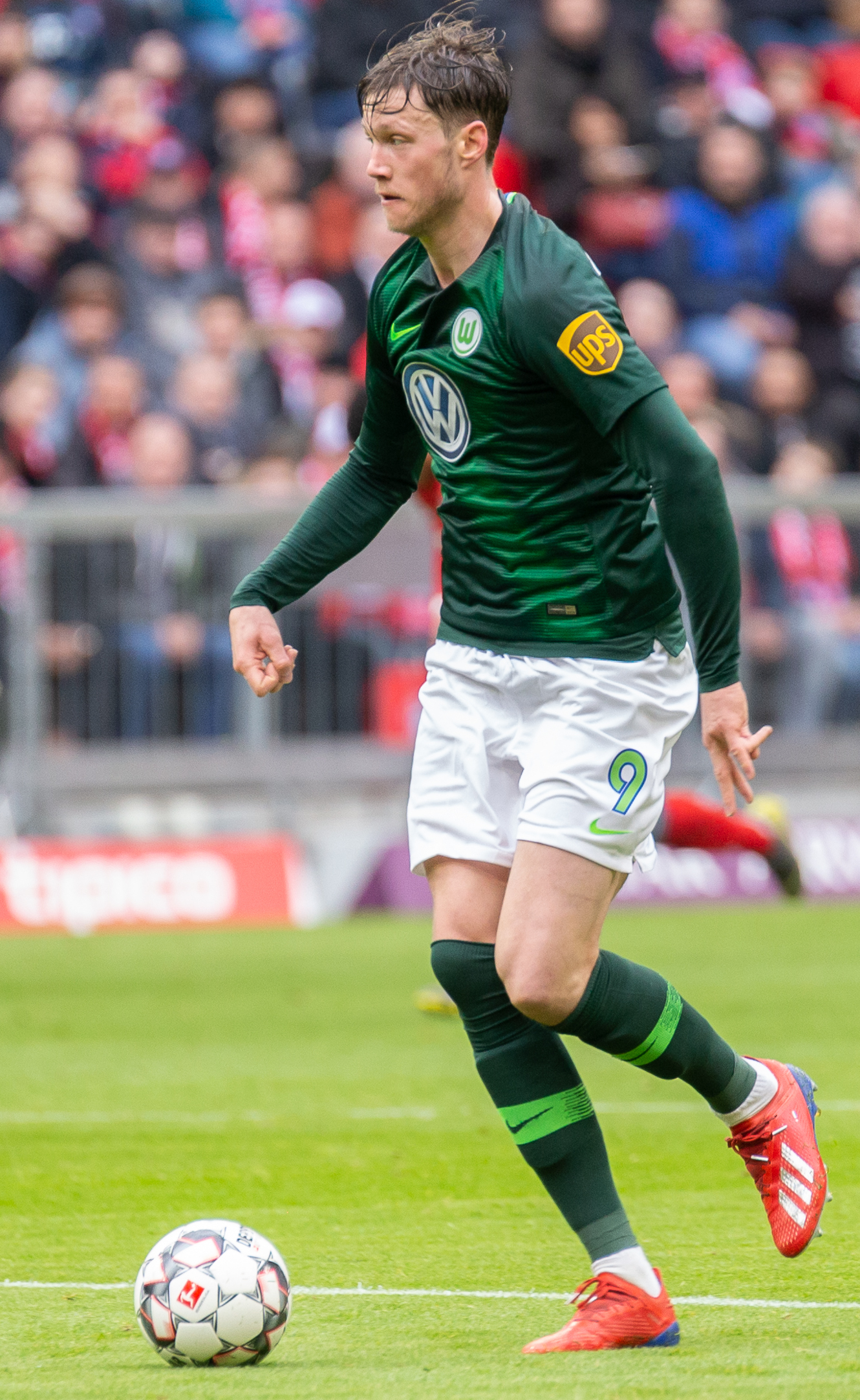
Weghorst playing for VfL Wolfsburg in 2019

On 26 June 2018, Weghorst joined German club VfL Wolfsburg, for a reported transfer-fee of €10.5m.

He made his league debut for Wolfsburg against Schalke 04 in the opening match of the 2018–19 Bundesliga season and scored his first goal the following week in a 3–1 win at Bayer Leverkusen. On 16 March 2019, he scored his first hat-trick for Wolfsburg, and first by any player for the club since Mario Gómez in April 2017, in a 5–2 league win over Fortuna Düsseldorf. He ended the season with another hat-trick in the final Bundesliga fixture – an 8–1 win over FC Augsburg – giving him a final total of 17 goals, ranking joint-third in the Bundesliga goalscoring charts for the campaign.

In the 2019–20 Bundesliga season, Weghorst produced another impressive goal return, scoring 16 times in the league.

On 25 October 2020, he scored a goal in a 2–1 victory against Arminia Bielefeld, from a free-kick routine which was later replicated during the 2022 FIFA World Cup. In the 2020–21 season, he scored 20 goals in the Bundesliga and 25 times in all competitions, helping die Wölfe to a fourth-placed finish and qualification to the 2021–22 UEFA Champions League.

Weghorst scored six times in the first 20 Matchdays of the 2021–22 Bundesliga season, before the club accepted an offer for the player from English club Burnley during the January transfer window.

=== Burnley ===
On 31 January 2022, Weghorst signed a three-and-a-half-year contract with English club Burnley for a fee of £12 million. Weghorst made his Premier League debut for the club on 5 February, playing the full 90 minutes in a 0–0 draw with Watford at Turf Moor. Weghorst scored his first goal for the club on 19 February in a 3–0 win against Brighton & Hove Albion, helping to end an eleven-game winless run for his new club. His second Burnley goal came on 17 April, in a 1–1 draw against West Ham United.

Burnley ended the 2021–22 season in 18th place, resulting in relegation to the EFL Championship, with Weghorst registering only two goals from 20 appearances.

==== Loans to Beşiktaş, Manchester United and TSG Hoffenheim ====
On 5 July 2022, Weghorst signed for Süper Lig club Beşiktaş on loan until the end of the 2022–23 season. He made his Süper Lig debut on 6 August in a 1–0 home win against Kayserispor and scored his first league goal on 21 August, with the opening goal against Fatih Karagümrük in a 4–1 win for Beşiktaş. On 7 January 2023, he scored a goal in his last match for Beşiktaş which ended in a 2–1 victory over Kasımpaşa.

His loan to Beşiktaş was cancelled in January ahead of a loan to Manchester United, with a £3 million loan fee being split between Burnley and Beşiktaş. On 13 January, Weghorst signed for United on loan until the end of the season, joining compatriot coach Erik ten Hag. He was given the number 27 shirt most recently worn by Alex Telles. On 18 January, he made his debut by starting in a 1–1 away draw against Crystal Palace.

On 25 January, he scored his first goal for United in a 3–0 away win over Nottingham Forest in the EFL Cup semi-final first leg. On 26 February, he played in the 2023 EFL Cup final and assisted Marcus Rashford for United's second goal of the match in their 2–0 victory over Newcastle United. It was the first time in his career that he had won a trophy. On 9 March, he scored his first goal at Old Trafford in a 4–1 win against Real Betis in the Europa League round of 16.

On 9 August 2023, he joined TSG Hoffenheim on a season-long loan. During his spell in Hoffenheim, Weghorst scored seven goals from 28 Bundesliga matches.

==== Return to Burnley ====
On 21 May 2024, Burnley said the player would be returning once the loan ended. He made his EFL Championship debut as a substitute for Lyle Foster in Burnley's opening game of the 2024–25 season, a 4–1 win over Luton Town on 12 August; it was his first appearance for the club in over two years.

=== Ajax ===
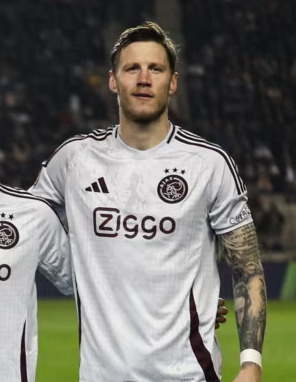
Weghorst in 2024 with Ajax

On 29 August 2024, Weghorst joined Eredivisie club Ajax on two-year deal. On 6 October 2024, Weghorst scored his first goal for Ajax, scoring in injury time in a 3–1 victory over Groningen.

=== Twente ===
On 27 June 2026, Weghorst signed a two-year contract with Twente, where he reunited with technical director Erik ten Hag. On 27 August, he recorded a goal and assist in a UEFA Conference League play-off round match against Qarabağ at the Baku Olympic Stadium, helping Twente to a 4–1 away win after extra time which secured qualification for the league phase. Later that year, on 1 November, he scored four goals in a 9–0 away win over Excelsior.

== International career ==
=== Youth ===
On 3 October 2014, Weghorst was called up to the Netherlands under-21 team for the first time for their two-legged 2015 UEFA European Under-21 Championship qualification play-off against Portugal. He made his first and only appearance for the Jong Oranje in the second leg, scoring the team's first goal and winning a penalty kick converted by Nathan Aké for their fourth in a 5–4 defeat.

=== Senior team ===
Weghorst received his first full international call-up in Ronald Koeman's first Dutch squad in March 2018. He made his senior international debut in a friendly against England on 23 March at the Amsterdam Arena, appearing an 89th-minute substitute for Stefan de Vrij.

==== UEFA Euro 2020 ====
On 26 May 2021, Weghorst was selected in the Netherlands squad for UEFA Euro 2020, Weghorst scored his first senior international goal in the team's final pre-tournament friendly against Georgia on 6 June.

He started in the Netherlands' opening match of the tournament, scoring the team's second goal of a 3–2 win against Ukraine in Amsterdam. He went on to start the second match against Austria and appear as a substitute in the third against North Macedonia, as well as the round of 16 loss to Czechia.

==== 2022 FIFA World Cup ====
In November 2022, Weghorst was selected as a member of the Dutch squad for the 2022 FIFA World Cup in Qatar. He made substitute appearances against both Ecuador and Qatar in the group stage, as well as the United States in the round of 16.

In the quarter-final match against Argentina, Weghorst came on as a 78th-minute substitute with the Netherlands trailing 2–0. After pulling a goal back with an 83rd-minute header, he equalised with a left-footed finish from Teun Koopmeiners' disguised free-kick eleven minutes into added time to send the match into extra time and an eventual penalty shootout. After saves by Emiliano Martínez from the Netherlands' first two kicks by Virgil van Dijk and Steven Berghuis, Weghorst's successful fourth kick was in vain as the Oranje were eliminated 4–3 in the shootout. The bad tempered match came to be known as the Battle of Lusail due to the World Cup record 18 yellow cards and one red card, including a booking for Weghorst for dissent prior to his entrance as a substitute. After the match, Weghorst was engaged in a confrontation with Lionel Messi after the Argentina captain refused to swap shirts with him. Weghorst interrupted Messi's post-match interview with TyC Sports, calling "Hey, Messi, eh, Messi", to which Messi replied dismissively by saying “Qué mirá(s), bobo? ¿Qué mirá(s), bobo? Andá pa allá, bobo. Andá pa allá.” ("What are you looking at, idiot? What are you looking at, idiot? Get lost, idiot. Get lost.") The response went on to become a popular meme on social media, particularly in Latin America, and Weghorst became known by the nickname "Bobo" by his Argentine teammate Lisandro Martínez during his loan spell at Manchester United in 2023.

==== UEFA Euro 2024 ====
During UEFA Euro 2024 qualifying, Weghorst scored three goals from eight appearances including winning goals in both fixtures against the Republic of Ireland, the latter of which ensured the Netherlands' qualification for the tournament finals in Germany.

On 29 May 2024, Weghorst was named in the Netherlands' squad for UEFA Euro 2024. He scored in the team's two final warm-up matches against Canada and Iceland respectively. In opening match against Poland, he came off the bench in the 81st minute, before scoring two minutes later off of his first touch to give his country a 2–1 victory.

==== 2026 FIFA World Cup ====
On 27 May 2026, Weghorst was named in the Netherlands' squad for the 2026 FIFA World Cup.

== Style of play ==
At 1.97 metres (6 ft 6 in), Weghorst commonly plays as a striker, in particular a 'target man' role, due to his ability to hold up the play. He is renowned as a goal poacher, with good reactive finishing inside the penalty area, but also regularly drops deep to help link play. In the 2021–22 Premier League season, Weghorst averaged more presses per 90 minutes than any other player. His style of play has been compared to that of Edin Džeko.

== Career statistics ==
=== Club ===
As of match played 8 November 2026

Appearances and goals by club, season and competition
Club	Season	League			National cup (Note: Includes KNVB Cup, DFB-Pokal, Turkish Cup, FA Cup)		League cup (Note: Includes EFL Cup)		Europe		Other		Total	
Club	Season	Division	Apps	Goals	Apps	Goals	Apps	Goals	Apps	Goals	Apps	Goals	Apps	Goals
Emmen	2012–13	Eerste Divisie	28	8	2	0	—		—		—		30	8
Emmen	2013–14	Eerste Divisie	34	12	2	1	—		—		—		36	13
Emmen	Total		62	20	4	1	—		—		—		66	21
Heracles Almelo	2014–15	Eredivisie	31	8	3	1	—		—		—		34	9
Heracles Almelo	2015–16	Eredivisie	33	12	2	1	—		—		4 (Note: Appearances in Eredivisie European play-offs)	2	39	15
Heracles Almelo	Total		64	20	5	2	—		—		4	2	73	24
AZ	2016–17	Eredivisie	29	13	4	0	—		12 (Note: Appearances in UEFA Europa League)	1	4	4	49	18
AZ	2017–18	Eredivisie	31	18	6	9	—		—		—		37	27
AZ	Total		60	31	10	9	—		12	1	4	4	86	45
VfL Wolfsburg	2018–19	Bundesliga	34	17	2	1	—		—		—		36	18
VfL Wolfsburg	2019–20	Bundesliga	32	16	2	2	—		9	2	—		43	20
VfL Wolfsburg	2020–21	Bundesliga	34	20	4	3	—		3	2	—		41	25
VfL Wolfsburg	2021–22	Bundesliga	18	6	1	1	—		5 (Note: Appearances in UEFA Champions League)	0	—		24	7
VfL Wolfsburg	Total		118	59	9	7	—		17	4	—		144	70
Burnley	2021–22	Premier League	20	2	—		—		—		—		20	2
Burnley	2024–25	Championship	2	0	—		0	0	—		—		2	0
Burnley	Total		22	2	0	0	0	0	—		—		22	2
Beşiktaş (loan)	2022–23	Süper Lig	16	8	2	1	—		—		—		18	9
Manchester United (loan)	2022–23	Premier League	17	0	5	0	3	1	6	1	—		31	2
TSG Hoffenheim (loan)	2023–24	Bundesliga	28	7	2	0	—		—		—		30	7
Ajax	2024–25	Eredivisie	24	10	2	0	—		5	1	—		31	11
Ajax	2025–26	Eredivisie	27	8	0	0	—		5	1	2	0	34	9
Ajax	Total		51	18	2	0	—		10	2	2	0	65	20
Twente	2026–27	Eredivisie	12	9	0	0	—		8 (Note: Two appearances and one goal in UEFA Europa League, six appearances and two goals in UEFA Conference League)	3	—		20	12
Career total			450	177	39	20	3	1	53	11	10	6	555	214

=== International ===
As of match played 29 June 2026

Appearances and goals by national team and year
National team	Year	Apps	Goals
Netherlands	2018	3	0
Netherlands	2019	1	0
Netherlands	2020	0	0
Netherlands	2021	8	2
Netherlands	2022	7	3
Netherlands	2023	10	3
Netherlands	2024	14	6
Netherlands	2025	6	0
Netherlands	2026	4	0
Total		53	14

As of match played 3 June 2026
Netherlands score listed first, score column indicates score after each Weghorst goal.

International goals by date, venue, cap, opponent, score, result and competition
No.	Date	Venue	Cap	Opponent	Score	Result	Competition
1	6 June 2021	De Grolsch Veste, Enschede, Netherlands	6	Georgia	2–0	3–0	Friendly
2	13 June 2021	Johan Cruyff Arena, Amsterdam, Netherlands	7	Ukraine	2–0	3–2	UEFA Euro 2020
3	8 June 2022	Cardiff City Stadium, Cardiff, Wales	13	Wales	2–1	2–1	2022–23 UEFA Nations League A
4	9 December 2022	Lusail Iconic Stadium, Lusail, Qatar	19	Argentina	1–2	2–2 (3–4 p)	2022 FIFA World Cup
5	9 December 2022	Lusail Iconic Stadium, Lusail, Qatar	19	Argentina	2–2	2–2 (3–4 p)	2022 FIFA World Cup
6	7 September 2023	Philips Stadion, Eindhoven, Netherlands	24	Greece	3–0	3–0	UEFA Euro 2024 qualifying
7	10 September 2023	Aviva Stadium, Dublin, Ireland	25	Republic of Ireland	2–1	2–1	UEFA Euro 2024 qualifying
8	18 November 2023	Johan Cruyff Arena, Amsterdam, Netherlands	28	Republic of Ireland	1–0	1–0	UEFA Euro 2024 qualifying
9	22 March 2024	Johan Cruyff Arena, Amsterdam, Netherlands	30	Scotland	3–0	4–0	Friendly
10	6 June 2024	De Kuip, Rotterdam, Netherlands	32	Canada	3–0	4–0	Friendly
11	10 June 2024	De Kuip, Rotterdam, Netherlands	33	Iceland	4–0	4–0	Friendly
12	16 June 2024	Volksparkstadion, Hamburg, Germany	34	Poland	2–1	2–1	UEFA Euro 2024
13	7 September 2024	Philips Stadion, Eindhoven, Netherlands	40	Bosnia and Herzegovina	4–2	5–2	2024–25 UEFA Nations League A
14	16 November 2024	Johan Cruyff Arena, Amsterdam, Netherlands	42	Hungary	1–0	4–0	2024–25 UEFA Nations League A

== Honours ==
AZ

- KNVB Cup runner-up: 2016–17, 2017–18

Manchester United

- EFL Cup: 2022–23
- FA Cup runner-up: 2022–23
