= Argentina–Netherlands football rivalry =

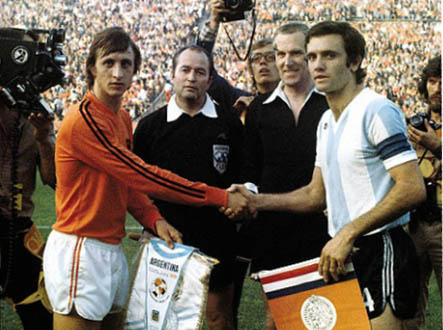
- Johan Cruyff and Roberto Perfumo greeting before playing the 1974 FIFA World Cup match
- Location: Argentina (CONMEBOL); Netherlands (UEFA)
- Teams: Argentina; Netherlands
- First meeting: 26 May 1974; Friendly; Netherlands 4–1 Argentina
- Latest meeting: 9 December 2022; FIFA World Cup; Argentina 2–2 (a.e.t.) (4–3 p) Netherlands

Statistics
- Total meetings: 10
- Most wins: Netherlands (4)
- Largest victory: Netherlands 4–0 Argentina (FIFA World Cup, 26 June 1974)
- Largest goal scoring: Netherlands 4–1 Argentina (26 May 1974)

World Cup matches
- 1974 group stage: Netherlands won 4–0; 1978 final: Argentina won 3–1 (a.e.t.); 1998 quarter-final: Netherlands won 2–1; 2006 group stage: Draw 0–0; 2014 semi-final: Argentina won 0–0 (a.e.t.; 4–2p); 2022 quarter-final: Argentina won 2–2 (a.e.t.; 4–3p)

The Argentina–Netherlands football rivalry is a highly competitive sports rivalry that exists between the national football teams of the two countries, as well as their respective sets of fans.

Unlike many football rivalries, this rivalry is intercontinental, pairing the Argentina national team from South America (CONMEBOL) with the Dutch team from Europe (UEFA).

Their first meeting was in an international friendly in May 1974, following which the two teams met just one month later in the group stage of the 1974 FIFA World Cup. Since then, the matchup has become one of the most common in the World Cup, with the two teams meeting a total of six times during the tournament.

In 10 meetings total, the Netherlands have won four games to Argentina's one, with the other five matches ending in a draw, including two victories for Argentina in the World Cup knockout stages via penalty shootouts (2014 and 2022). (Note: Three of the five draws were won by Argentina during penalty shoot-outs.)

== History ==
Considered by sports media to be two historically great teams, the Argentines and Dutch have developed an intense rivalry. They have met ten times in total, including six FIFA World Cup matches.

=== First matches ===
The two teams first met on 26 May 1974 in an international friendly, won by the Netherlands 4–1. The following month, the two teams were drawn into Group A of the second round of the 1974 FIFA World Cup held in West Germany. Their first FIFA World Cup matchup took place on 26 June; Johan Cruyff scored two goals in a victory for the Netherlands, which saw the Dutch defeat Argentina 4–0.

=== 1978 FIFA World Cup final and 1979 friendly ===
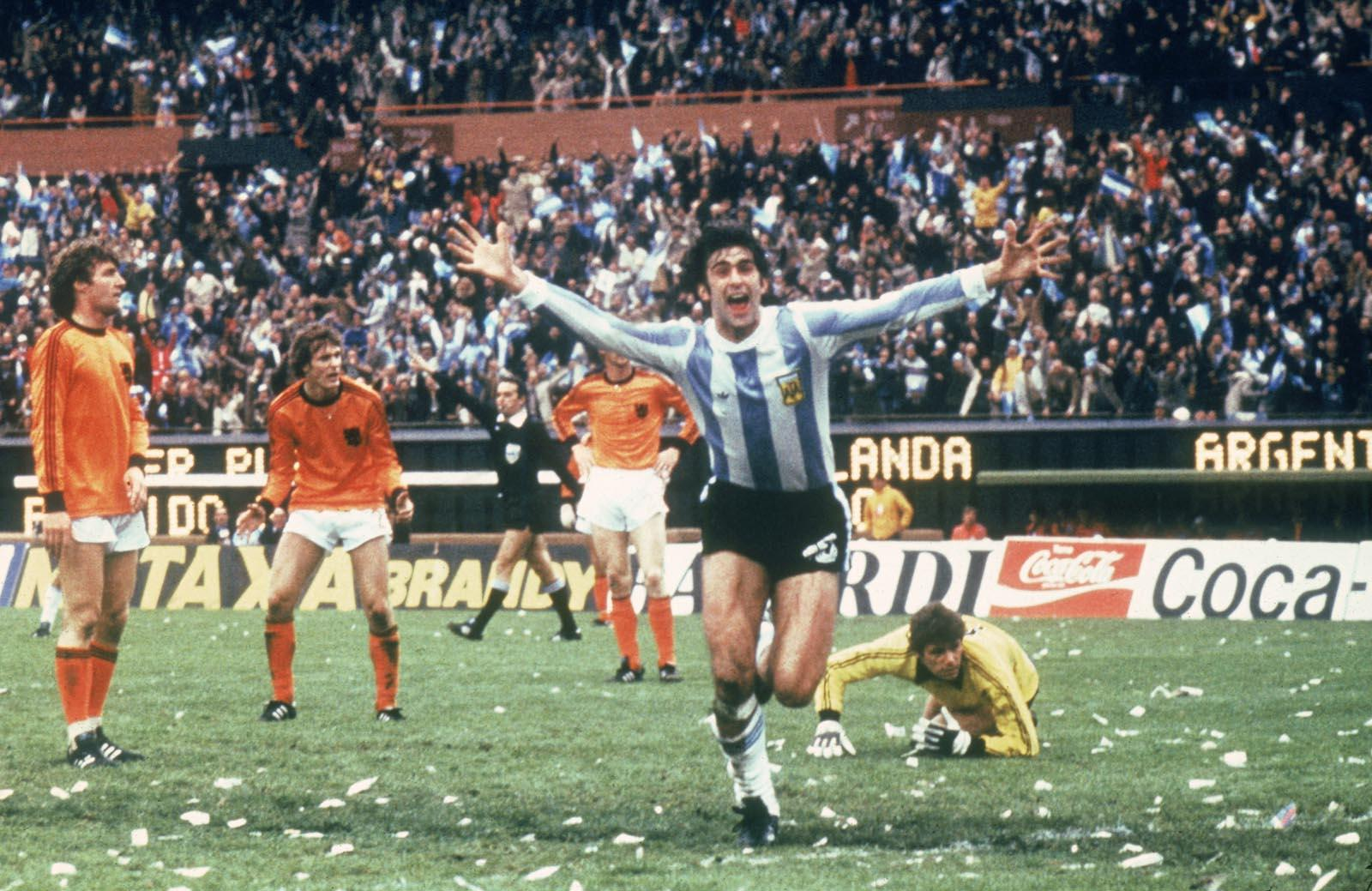
Argentine Mario Kempes celebrating a goal at the 1978 FIFA World Cup final

The two teams met again in the 1978 FIFA World Cup final, with Argentina avenging their 1974 loss, defeating the Netherlands 3–1, after extra time. Argentina hosted the 1978 tournament which was marred by controversy, with political pressure allegedly favoring Argentina on the pitch. Held under the backdrop of Jorge Rafael Videla's dictatorship, the tournament was seen as a tool for Argentine nationalist propaganda. The Peruvian national team were allegedly bribed to throw their match against Argentina, which sent the latter to the final over Brazil. In the final, Mario Kempes and Dick Nanninga scored during regulation, for Argentina and the Netherlands, respectively. Tied at 1–1, the match went into extra time. Kempes scored again and Daniel Bertoni added another goal for the Argentines, securing them a 3–1 victory.

Daniel Bertoni during the Netherlands 0 (7) v (8) 0 Argentina, 1979 friendly

The two teams met again the following year for a friendly game organized by FIFA to celebrate the organization's 75th anniversary. The game was documented by Sports Illustrated writer Clive Gammon to be hotly contested, ending in a 0–0 draw; FIFA opted to stage a penalty shootout, which ended 8–7 in Argentina's favor. The game was also notable for featuring an 18-year-old Diego Maradona, who joined Argentina's roster due to a leg injury to Kempes.

=== 1998 FIFA World Cup match and subsequent friendlies ===
After not meeting during the 1980s, the two teams met during the quarter-finals of the 1998 FIFA World Cup. The Netherlands' Patrick Kluivert and Argentina's Claudio López traded goals early in the match, before each side had a player sent off. Arthur Numan of the Netherlands was ruled out after receiving two yellow cards. Meanwhile, Argentina's Ariel Ortega was ejected after a headbutt on Dutch goalkeeper Edwin van der Sar following a dive in the penalty area. Tied at 1–1, Dennis Bergkamp scored in the 90th minute to give the Dutch a 2–1 victory; Bergkamp's winner would become regarded as one of the most iconic goals in FIFA World Cup history.

The two teams met for a friendly in March 1999, which ended in a 1–1 draw. Another friendly between the two sides took place in February 2003; it saw Giovanni van Bronckhorst score a late goal in the 87th minute to give the Dutch a 1–0 victory.

=== Scoreless draws in the 2006 and 2014 FIFA World Cups ===
The two teams played in three consecutive draws in FIFA World Cup matches in 2006, 2014, and 2022. The 2006 match occurred during the tournament's group stage, as the Dutch and the Argentines were both drawn into Group C. The final group stage game for both squads, they entered the game having both already secured a trip to the tournament's knockout stage. With Argentina having a better goal difference, the Dutch needed to win in order to top the group, but could only draw 0–0, and, therefore, Argentina won the group while the Netherlands finished in second.

Argentina and the Netherlands met again in the semi-finals of the 2014 FIFA World Cup. Described as "tedious" by BBC writer Phil McNulty, the game provided little offense, as both defenses remained in control throughout the 0–0 draw. Deadlocked after extra time, Argentina prevailed 4–2 on penalties. They converted all four of their penalty attempts, while the Dutch's Ron Vlaar and Wesley Sneijder had their attempts saved by Argentine goalkeeper Sergio Romero.

=== 2022 FIFA World Cup quarter-finals ===
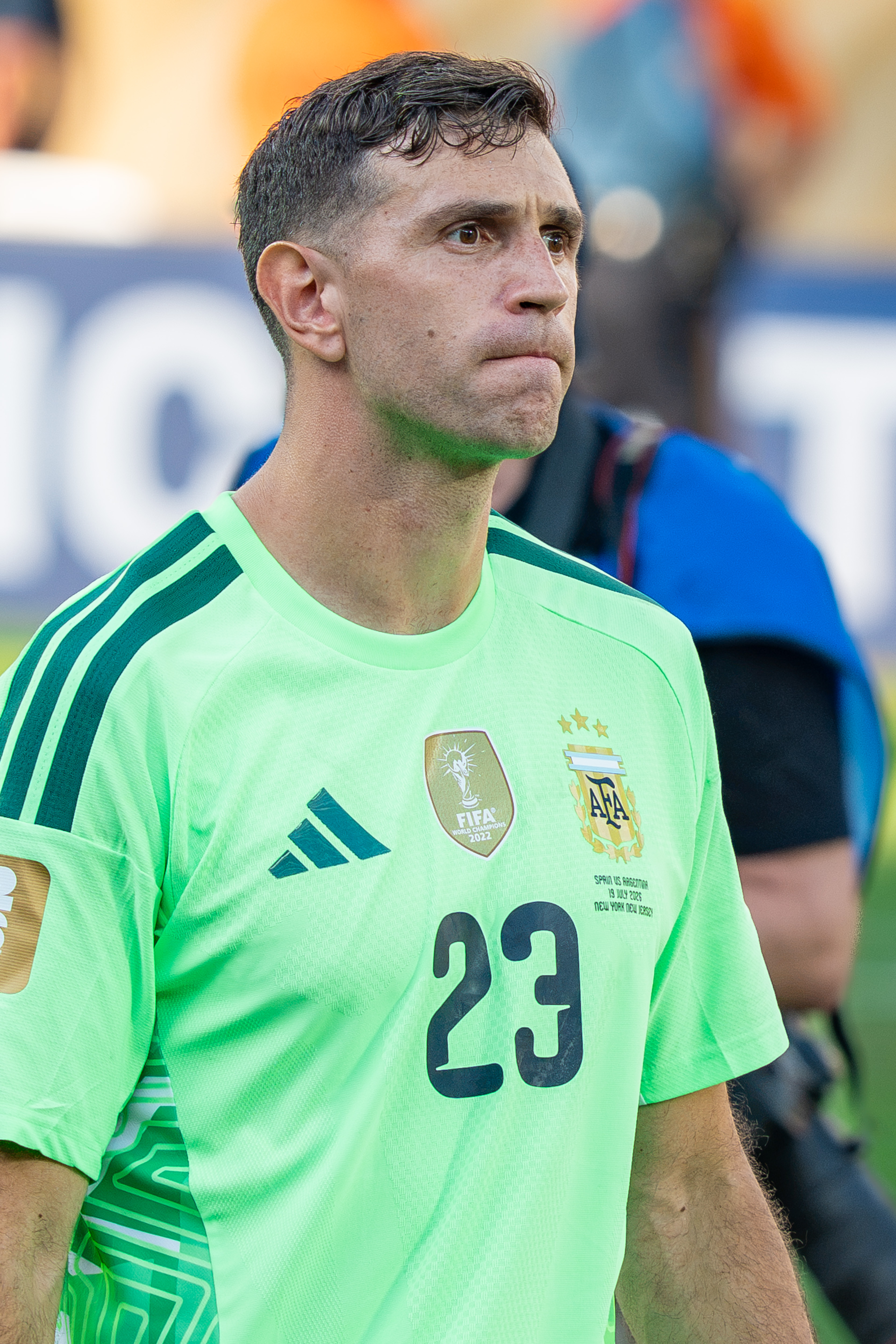
Argentina goalkeeper Emiliano Martínez made two key saves during the decisive penalty shoot-out

The two teams met in the 2022 tournament's quarter-finals. The game was noted for its contentious nature prior to, during, and after the match. Prior to the match, Dutch manager Louis van Gaal stated "we've got a score to settle with Argentina for what happened two World Cups ago". The match saw Argentina take a 2–0 lead after Lionel Messi assisted Nahuel Molina on a goal in the first half, before scoring on a penalty goal in the second.

Wout Weghorst, a late-game substitution for the Netherlands scored 2 goals, including one in the eleventh and final minute of stoppage time to help the Dutch even the game at 2–2. Between Weghorst's two goals, both benches cleared and players from both teams engaged in a scuffle due to a harsh foul from Leandro Paredes and the ball being kicked toward the Dutch sideline. The game remained tied after extra time, sending the two teams to a penalty shootout. Argentina prevailed 4–3, with both teams attempting five shots. Argentine goalkeeper Emiliano Martinez made two saves and was notably animated during the shootout. Lautaro Martínez converted on Argentina's fifth attempt to send them to the semi-finals en route to their third FIFA World Cup victory.

The game was noted by many football writers to be dramatic and hotly contested. (Note: Sources that share such an opinion include:) This match is referred to as the Battle of Lusail (Spanish: Batalla de Lusail, Dutch: De slag om Lusail) according to reports and fans.

== Comparison in major tournaments ==
Key

Denotes which team finished better in that particular competition.
DNQ: Did not qualify.
DNP: Did not participate.
TBD: To be determined.

| Tournament | Argentina | Netherlands | Notes |
|---|---|---|---|
| 1930 FIFA World Cup | 2nd | DNP | |
| 1934 FIFA World Cup | 10th | 9th | |
| 1938 FIFA World Cup | Withdrew | 14th | |
| 1950 FIFA World Cup | Withdrew | DNP | |
| 1954 FIFA World Cup | Withdrew | DNP | |
| 1958 FIFA World Cup | 13th | DNQ | |
| 1962 FIFA World Cup | 9th | DNQ | |
| 1966 FIFA World Cup | 5th | DNQ | |
| 1970 FIFA World Cup | DNQ | DNQ | |
| 1974 FIFA World Cup | 8th | 2nd | In the group stage, the Netherlands defeated Argentina 4–0. |
| 1978 FIFA World Cup | 1st | 2nd | Tournament hosted by Argentina. In the final, Argentina defeated the Netherlands 3–1 after extra time. |
| 1982 FIFA World Cup | 11th | DNQ | |
| 1986 FIFA World Cup | 1st | DNQ | |
| 1990 FIFA World Cup | 2nd | 15th | |
| 1994 FIFA World Cup | 10th | 7th | |
| 1998 FIFA World Cup | 6th | 4th | In the quarterfinals, the Netherlands defeated Argentina 2–1. |
| 2002 FIFA World Cup | 18th | DNQ | |
| 2006 FIFA World Cup | 6th | 11th | In the group stage, the match ended 0–0. |
| 2010 FIFA World Cup | 5th | 2nd | |
| 2014 FIFA World Cup | 2nd | 3rd | In the semifinals, Argentina defeated the Netherlands 4–2 on penalties after the match ended 0–0 after extra time. |
| 2018 FIFA World Cup | 16th | DNQ | |
| 2022 FIFA World Cup | 1st | 5th | In the quarterfinals, Argentina defeated the Netherlands 4–3 on penalties after the match ended 2–2 after extra time. |
| 2026 FIFA World Cup | 2nd | 17th | |
| 2030 FIFA World Cup | TBD | | |

== Match history ==
Legend

- ‡ – Indicates the goal was scored from a penalty kick

List of matches played between Argentina and Netherlands
| No. | Date | Venue | Winner | Score | Netherlands scorers | Argentina scorers | Competition | Ref. |
|---|---|---|---|---|---|---|---|---|
| 1 | 26 May 1974 | Olympic Stadium, Amsterdam, Netherlands | Netherlands | 4–1 | Neeskens (29'‡), Rensenbrink (31'), Strik (74'), Haan (77') | Ayala (34') | Friendly | |
| 2 | 26 June 1974 | Parkstadion, Gelsenkirchen, Germany | Netherlands | 4–0 | Cruyff (12', 88'), Krol (25'), Rep (73') | — | 1974 FIFA World Cup | |
| 3 | 25 June 1978 | Estadio Monumental, Buenos Aires, Argentina | Argentina | 3–1 (a.e.t.) | Nanninga (81') | Kempes (37', 104'), Bertoni (114') | 1978 FIFA World Cup | |
| 4 | 22 May 1979 | Stadion Wankdorf, Bern, Switzerland | Draw | 0–0 (a.e.t.) (ARG won 8–7 p.) | — | — | Friendly | |
| 5 | 4 July 1998 | Stade Vélodrome, Marseille, France | Netherlands | 2–1 | Kluivert (12'), Bergkamp (90') | López (17') | 1998 FIFA World Cup | |
| 6 | 31 March 1999 | Amsterdam ArenA, Amsterdam, Netherlands | Draw | 1–1 | Davids (10') | Batistuta (84') | Friendly | |
| 7 | 12 February 2003 | Amsterdam ArenA, Amsterdam, Netherlands | Netherlands | 1–0 | Van Bronckhorst (87') | — | Friendly | |
| 8 | 21 June 2006 | Waldstadion, Frankfurt, Germany | Draw | 0–0 | — | — | 2006 FIFA World Cup | |
| 9 | 9 July 2014 | Arena Corinthians, São Paulo, Brazil | Draw | 0–0 (a.e.t.) (ARG won 4–2 p.) | — | — | 2014 FIFA World Cup | |
| 10 | 9 December 2022 | Lusail Stadium, Lusail, Qatar | Draw | 2–2 (a.e.t.) (ARG won 4–3 p.) | Weghorst (83', 90+10') | Molina (35'), Messi (73'‡) | 2022 FIFA World Cup | |

== Head-to-head ==
| Competition | Matches | Wins | | PK wins | | Draws |
|---|---|---|---|---|---|---|
| Competition | Matches | ARG | NED | ARG | NED | Draws |
| World Cup | 6 | 1 | 2 | 2 | 0 | 1 |
| Friendly | 4 | 0 | 2 | 1 | 0 | 1 |
| Total | 10 | 1 | 4 | 3 | 0 | 2 |

== Official titles comparison ==
| Senior titles | Argentina | Netherlands |
|---|---|---|
| World Cup | 3 | 0 |
| FIFA Confederations Cup | 1 | 0 |
| CONMEBOL–UEFA Cup of Champions | 2 | 0 |
| Copa América/European Championship | 16 | 1 |
| Panamerican/Nations League | 1 | 0 |
| Total | 23 | 1 |
