= Battle of Lusail =

2022 FIFA World Cup Argentina–Netherlands quarter-final match

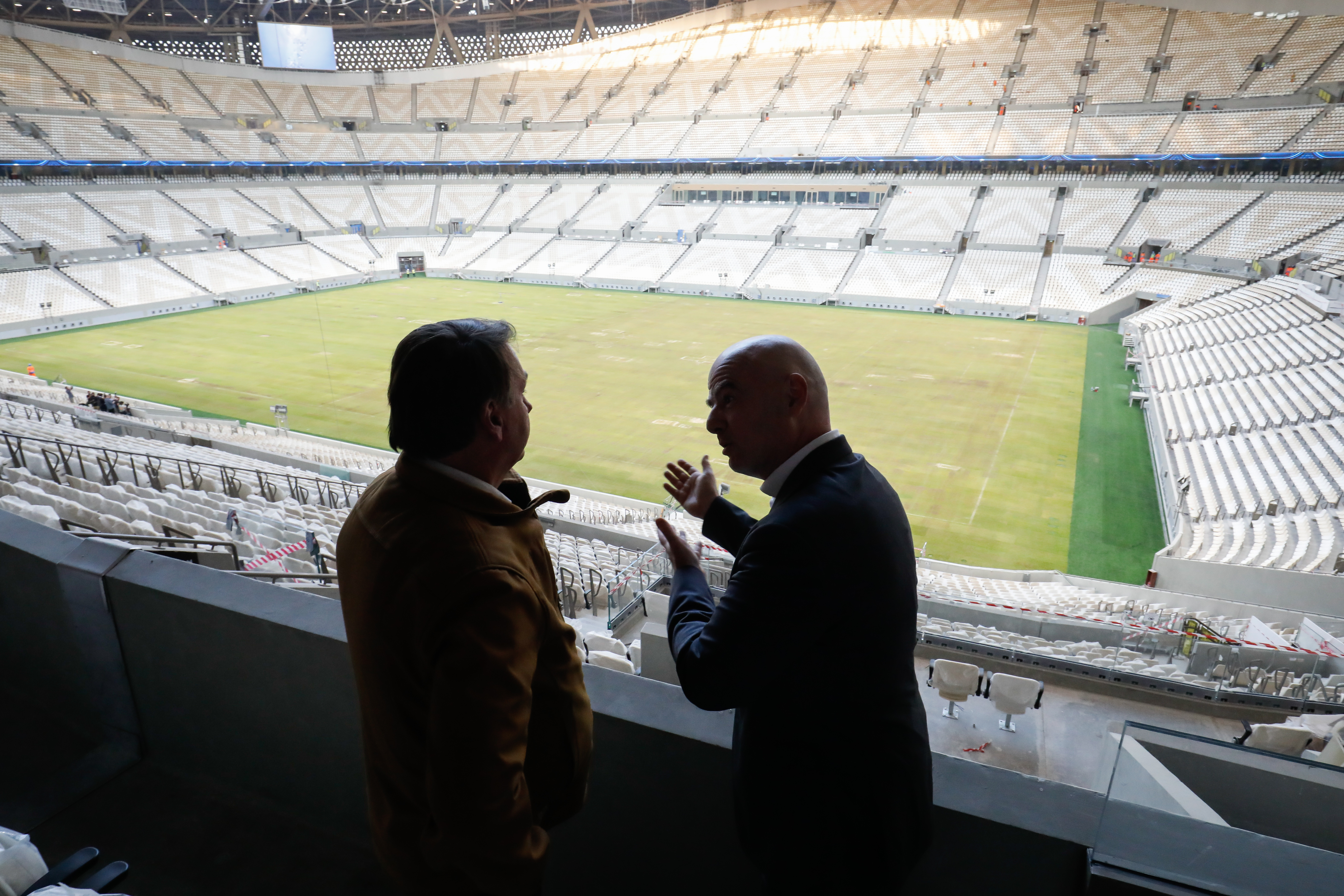
- Lusail Stadium, where the match took place
- Event: 2022 FIFA World Cup; Quarter-finals
Netherlands	Argentina
(Netherlands)	(Argentina)
2	2
- After extra time Argentina won 4–3 on penalties
- Date: 9 December 2022
- Venue: Lusail Stadium, Lusail, Qatar
- Man of the Match: Lionel Messi (Argentina)
- Referee: Antonio Mateu Lahoz (Spain)
- Attendance: 88,235
- Weather: Fair; 22 °C (72 °F)

The Battle of Lusail (Arabic: معركة لوسيل, Spanish: Batalla de Lusail, Dutch: De slag van Lusail) is the nickname of a football match played in the quarter-finals of the 2022 FIFA World Cup between the Netherlands and Argentina at the Lusail Stadium in Lusail, Qatar on 9 December 2022.

Spanish referee Antonio Mateu Lahoz issued a FIFA World Cup record 18 yellow cards and one red card, setting a new record for cautions at any FIFA-administered international tournament. Given the physical and confrontational nature between the two teams in their sixth World Cup meeting, the Battle of Lusail is considered one of the major matches in the longstanding Argentina–Netherlands football rivalry.

== Background ==
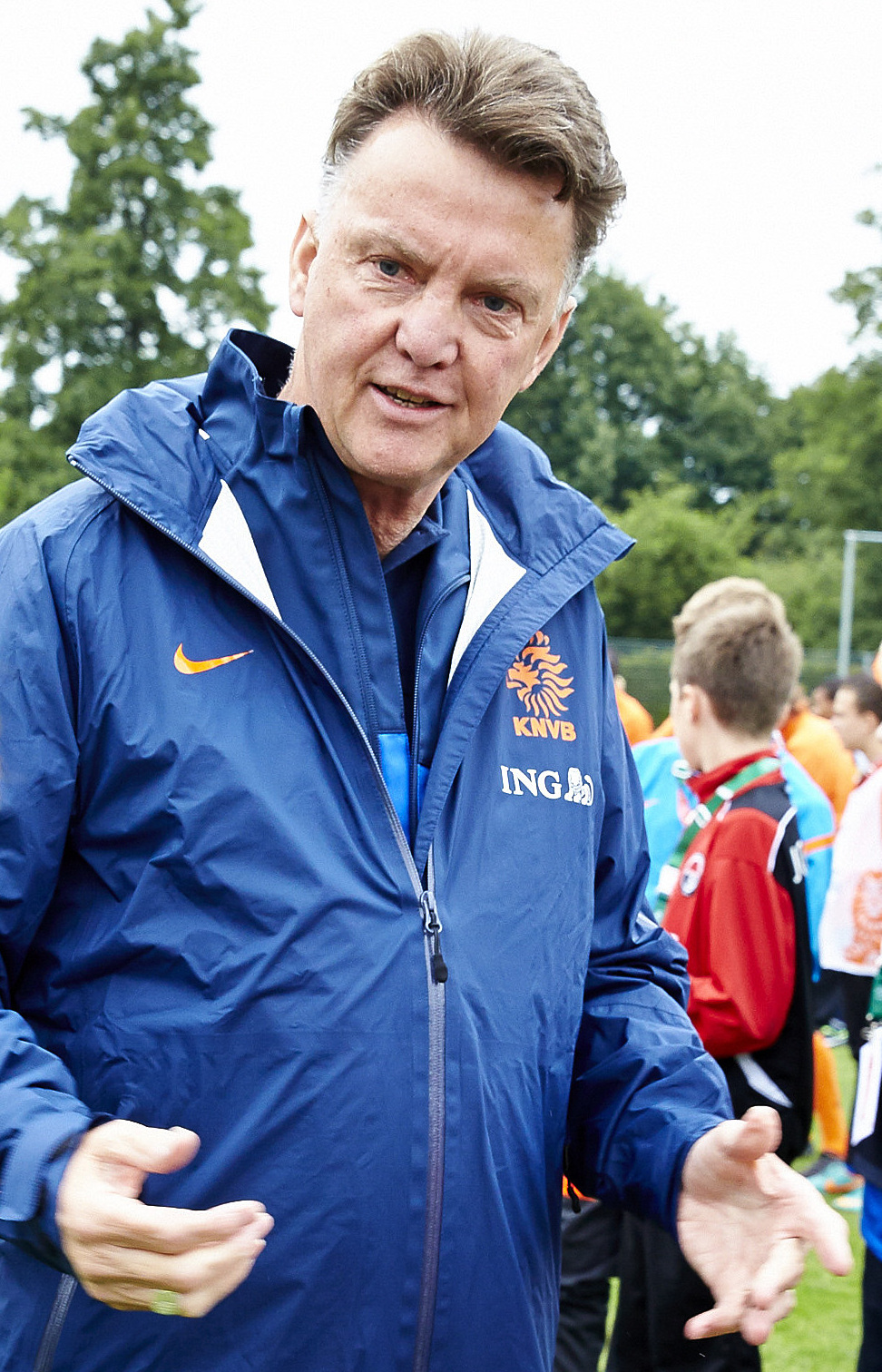
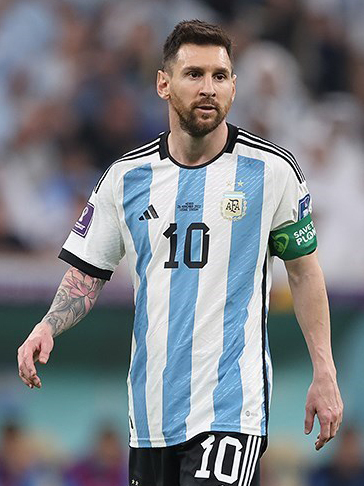
Comments made by Netherlands manager Louis van Gaal (left) regarding Argentina forward and captain Lionel Messi (right) enraged several Argentina players prior to the match.

The Netherlands and Argentina had previously met nine times, developing a rivalry with one another; the Dutch won four of the nine matches, while the Argentines won one match, with the other four matches ending in a draw, two of which saw Argentina winning on penalties. Five of the prior matches occurred in the World Cup: a 4–0 win for the Dutch at the second group stage in 1974 was answered by a 3–1 win for the Argentines in the 1978 final. The Dutch won 2–1 in the 1998 quarter-finals prior to two goalless draws in the 2006 group stage and at the semi-final stage of the previous major tournament where they both had made an appearance, the 2014 FIFA World Cup held in Brazil, finished in a 0–0 draw after extra-time, with Argentina going through after winning the penalties 4–2. The previous game had been similarly intense and close but had not featured the same level of animosity between the players. Lionel Messi for Argentina and Daley Blind for the Netherlands were the only players who took part in that fixture who were also on the pitch in Lusail, in addition to Netherlands manager Louis van Gaal.

The Netherlands entered the game having been undefeated in their 19 previous international matches. During pre-match interviews with the media, the Dutch side offered comments that were later revealed to have upset the Argentine side. Van Gaal stated to Dutch publication Nederlandse Omroep Stichting: "Messi is indeed the most dangerous player who creates the most chances and also makes them himself. But on the other hand he does not play much with the opponent when he has possession of the ball. That is also where our chances lie." After the two countries' previous World Cup matchup ended in a penalty shootout, the Dutch manager insisted that the team were practicing for such an outcome, stating "we hope we will have a minor advantage if we have to take penalties." Argentine goalkeeper Emiliano Martínez later stated that he screenshotted Van Gaal's comments on his phone and referred to them frequently as motivation. Dutch goalkeeper Andries Noppert told reporters days before the match that he felt confident in beating Messi from the penalty spot. Van Gaal also said that "we've got a score to settle with Argentina for what happened two World Cups ago."

== Match ==
External videos
- Match highlights, YouTube video by FIFA

=== Summary ===
==== First half ====
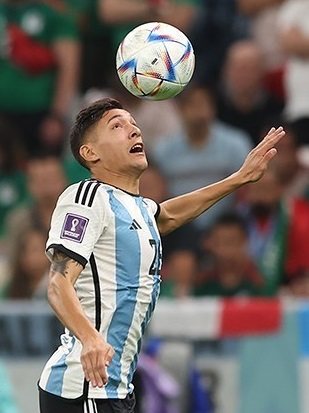
Argentina right back Nahuel Molina scored the first goal of the game off an assist from Messi.

The first half of the game was relatively balanced, with both sides never having a clear-cut chance for the opening half-hour of the game. Both teams had dominant spells, with Argentina coming close to creating a chance several times but being stopped by a disciplined Dutch defence. Walter Samuel, the Albiceleste assistant manager, was cautioned at around the half-hour mark. Argentina forward and captain Lionel Messi then cut through the Dutch defence with a precise pass to assist Nahuel Molina for the first goal of the night.

The half was relatively incident free but the game started getting more antagonistic from the 43rd minute onwards when the first yellow card was handed to Dutch centre-back Jurriën Timber, which was quickly followed by a trio of yellow cards for his team-mate Wout Weghorst, who was on the bench at the time, as well as Argentines Cristian Romero and Marcos Acuña, who received his second caution of the tournament and was thus rendered unavailable for the semi-finals. The half ended with Argentina in control, and the Dutch failing to create a clear goalscoring opportunity.

==== Second half ====
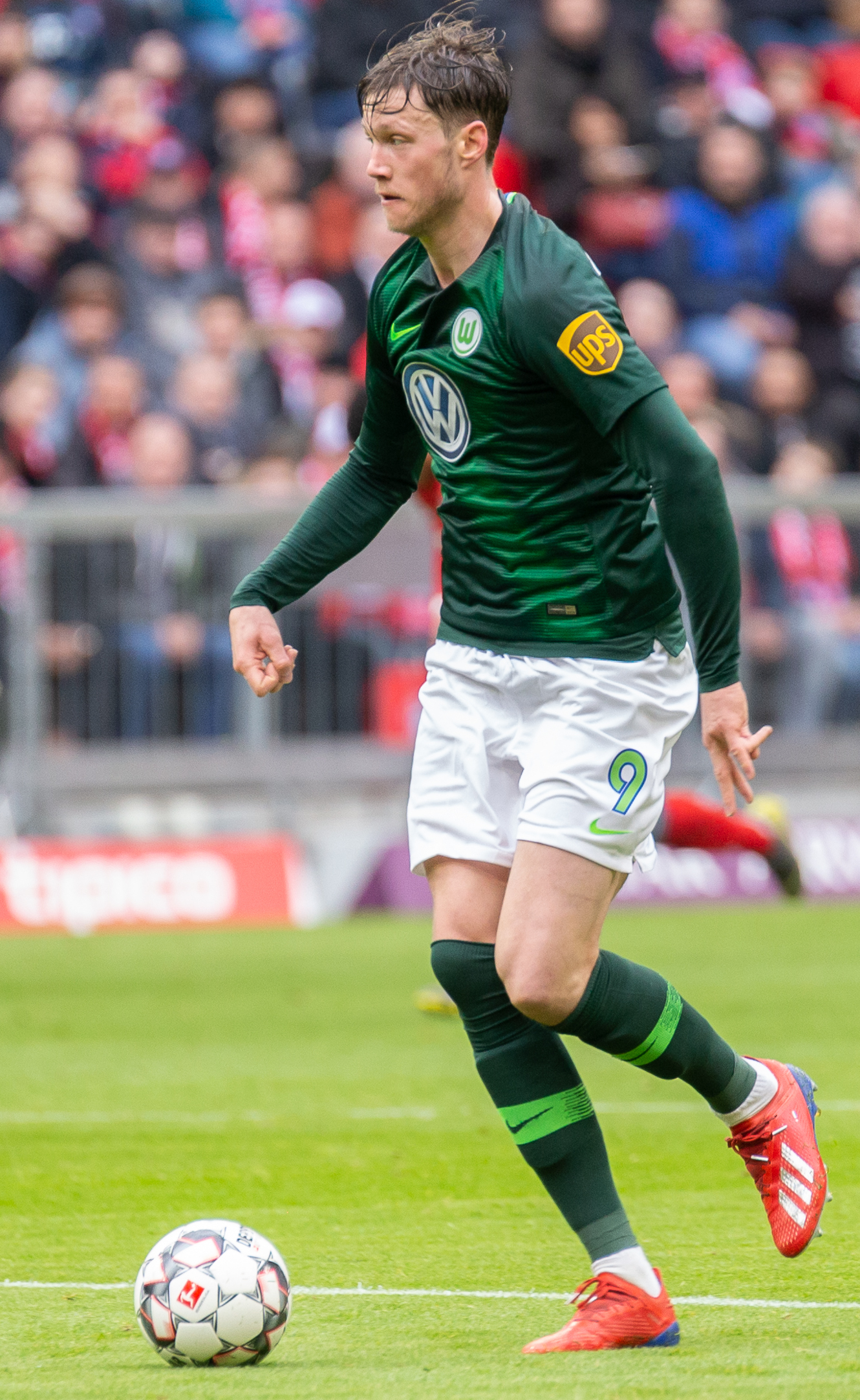
Netherlands striker Wout Weghorst scored twice, including a late equaliser to send the match to extra time.

The second half was highly dramatic, as the game intensified and the Dutch pressed on for an equaliser. Acuña was brought down at the edge of the box around the 70-minute mark, and Messi converted the resulting penalty. This handed the Argentines a two-goal lead with only 20 minutes of regulation time remaining. Messi then celebrated in front of Netherlands manager Louis van Gaal and the Dutch bench. The goal was also Messi's tenth goal in a World Cup match, tying Gabriel Batistuta's record for most World Cup goals by an Argentine player. Messi celebrated the goal by cupping his hands around his ears in front of the Dutch bench, which was considered a jibe toward Van Gaal. The gesture was reminiscent of a goal celebration sometimes used by former Argentina player Juan Roman Riquelme, whose relationship soured with Van Gaal when they were both at Barcelona in the early 2000s. Shortly after Messi's goal, a pitch invader ran onto the field in the 75th minute, but was quickly apprehended by security. As the Dutch players searched for a crucial goal, tempers rapidly flared as Memphis Depay and Lisandro Martínez both received yellow cards.

The Dutch then made substitutions to capitalise on their height and physical size advantages over the Argentine side. Weghorst, who had picked up a yellow card on the bench, was one of these substitutions, coming in for Depay. Weghorst then scored to make the score 2–1, beating the keeper with a header after a cross by Steven Berghuis. The Dutch then intensified the search for a vital equalising goal, and tempers flared greatly with several cautions handed out. Berghuis was given a yellow-card as anger increased between the two teams.

In the 88th minute, Leandro Paredes fouled Nathan Aké then booted the dead ball into the Dutch bench, leading to a major scuffle as the incensed Dutch players closed in on Paredes, who was shoved to the ground by Netherlands captain Virgil van Dijk. The Argentina bench then came to back their player up with pushing and shoving observed, as Paredes was promptly carded. The incidents caused tensions to increase to such a degree that even Argentina manager Lionel Scaloni was cautioned.

As regular time ended, 10 minutes of extra stoppage time was announced. During the 100th minute, a free kick was awarded to the Netherlands just outside the box, giving the side one final opportunity to draw the match level. Rather than shooting the ball above or around the Argentine wall, Dutch midfielder Teun Koopmeiners kicked a delicate pass to Weghorst, who snuck through the wall and quickly scored to equalise and send the match to extra time.

==== Extra time ====
After the shock of the last-minute equaliser, the Argentina players immediately went on the attack, trying to reimpose the goal advantage. However, resolute defending by the Netherlands saw the game stay tied. Argentina pressed on, creating several chances, and coming closest to scoring a goal when a shot by Enzo Fernández hit the goalpost. With the game tied after extra time, the match progressed to a penalty shoot-out.

==== Penalty shoot-out ====
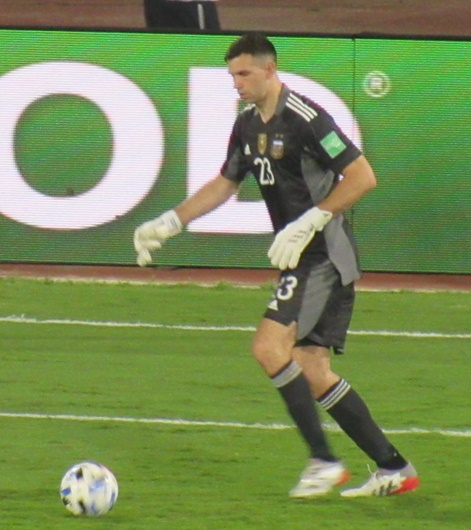
Argentina goalkeeper Emiliano Martínez made two key saves during the decisive penalty shoot-out.

Netherlands captain Van Dijk took their first penalty. His shot to the left was blocked by an athletic save from Argentina goalkeeper Emiliano Martínez. Messi then took the first penalty of the shootout for his side, and his second penalty of the night, sending the keeper the wrong way to coolly slot his penalty, giving Argentina an early 1–0 advantage. Martínez would then use several psychological tactics and measures of gamesmanship to distract his opponents and delay their penalty shots. Prior to Steven Berghuis turn, Martínez pretended to hand the ball to him before dropping it. Berghuis' effort was then saved by Martínez. Paredes would then score to give Argentina a 2–0 advantage after two turns each. Martínez stared down Teun Koopmeiners before he took his shot. However, Koopmeiners would score, giving the Netherlands their first penalty of the night and reducing the deficit to 2–1. The advantage would be restored by Gonzalo Montiel, whose penalty gave Argentina a 3–1 lead and made the game match point for the Dutch. Weghorst had to score his penalty, and despite Martínez kicking the ball to the centre circle prior to his turn, he delivered, to again reduce the arrears for the Dutch to 3–2.

The Netherlands would then use their own intimidation tactics against Argentina. Dutch players accompanied and verbally abused Fernández to rattle his confidence prior to his turn. This included Weghorst; after he scored he walked directly towards Fernández and exchanged words with him as the latter approached the penalty area. Fernández was then given a chance to take Argentina to the semi-finals, but his penalty went wide to the left – Argentina's first miss of the shootout and leaving the total at 3–2. Luuk De Jong also had to score and he delivered. De Jong's penalty marked the 3–3 equaliser for the Netherlands, leading to a decisive fifth penalty for Argentina. As Lautaro Martínez started walking from the centre circle, he was accompanied and harassed by several Dutch players, particularly defender Denzel Dumfries, who was given a yellow card for unsporting behaviour. Netherlands goalkeeper Andries Noppert would also attempt to intimidate Lautaro Martinez once the latter arrived in the penalty area. Despite the mind games of the Dutch, Lautaro Martínez would still score, securing the 4–3 total and giving Argentina their second consecutive victory over the Netherlands in penalty shootouts.

=== Details ===
9 December 2022
22:00

Netherlands	2–2 (a.e.t.)	Argentina
Weghorst 83', 90+11'		Molina 35'; Messi 73' (pen.)
Penalties
Van Dijk (penalty missed); Berghuis (penalty missed); Koopmeiners (penalty scored); Weghorst (penalty scored); L. de Jong (penalty scored)	3–4	(penalty scored) Messi; (penalty scored) Paredes; (penalty scored) Montiel; (penalty missed) Fernández; (penalty scored) La. Martínez

Lusail Stadium, Lusail
Attendance: 88,235
Referee: Antonio Mateu Lahoz (Spain)

Netherlands	Argentina

GK	23	Andries Noppert
CB	2	Jurriën Timber	(yellow card) 43'
CB	4	Virgil van Dijk (c)
CB	5	Nathan Aké
RWB	22	Denzel Dumfries	(yellow card) PSO (yellow-red card) FT
LWB	17	Daley Blind		(substituted off) 64'
CM	15	Marten de Roon		(substituted off) 46'
CM	21	Frenkie de Jong
AM	8	Cody Gakpo		(substituted off) 113'
CF	10	Memphis Depay	(yellow card) 76'	(substituted off) 78'
CF	7	Steven Bergwijn	(yellow card) AWET	(substituted off) 46'
Substitutions:
MF	11	Steven Berghuis	(yellow card) 88'	(substituted on) 46'
MF	20	Teun Koopmeiners		(substituted on) 46'
FW	9	Luuk de Jong		(substituted on) 64'
FW	19	Wout Weghorst	(yellow card) 45+2'	(substituted on) 78'
FW	12	Noa Lang	(yellow card) FT	(substituted on) 113'
Manager:
Louis van Gaal

GK	23	Emiliano Martínez
CB	13	Cristian Romero	(yellow card) 45'	(substituted off) 78'
CB	19	Nicolás Otamendi	(yellow card) 90+12'
CB	25	Lisandro Martínez	(yellow card) 76'	(substituted off) 112'
RWB	26	Nahuel Molina		(substituted off) 106'
LWB	8	Marcos Acuña	(yellow card) 43'	(substituted off) 78'
CM	7	Rodrigo De Paul		(substituted off) 67'
CM	24	Enzo Fernández
CM	20	Alexis Mac Allister
CF	9	Julián Alvarez		(substituted off) 82'
CF	10	Lionel Messi (c)	(yellow card) 90+10'
Substitutions:
MF	5	Leandro Paredes	(yellow card) 89'	(substituted on) 67'
DF	3	Nicolás Tagliafico		(substituted on) 78'
DF	6	Germán Pezzella	(yellow card) 112'	(substituted on) 78'
FW	22	Lautaro Martínez		(substituted on) 82'
DF	4	Gonzalo Montiel	(yellow card) 109'	(substituted on) 106'
FW	11	Ángel Di María		(substituted on) 112'
Other disciplinary actions:
TS	—	Walter Samuel	(yellow card) 31'
Manager:
Lionel Scaloni			(yellow card) 90'

Man of the Match:
Lionel Messi (Argentina)

Assistant referees:
Pau Cebrián Devís (Spain)
Roberto Díaz Pérez del Palomar (Spain)
Fourth official:
Victor Gomes (South Africa)
Reserve assistant referee:
Kyle Atkins (United States)
Video assistant referee:
Alejandro Hernández Hernández (Spain)

=== Statistics ===
Statistic	Netherlands	Argentina
Goals scored	2	2
Total shots	5	15
Shots on target	2	6
Ball possession	50%	50%
Corner kicks	2	8
Fouls committed	30	18
Offsides	1	2
Yellow cards	8	8 (Note: 10 yellow cards when including those issued to Argentina manager Lionel Scaloni and assistant manager Walter Samuel.)
Red cards	1	0

== Aftermath ==
The victory meant that Argentina had knocked the Netherlands out in both of the latter's two most recent World Cup appearances. Argentina advanced to the semi-finals to face Croatia, who had prevailed in their quarter-final against Brazil, also on penalties. However, the team would be without full-backs Marcos Acuña and Gonzalo Montiel, who would have to miss the next round due to yellow card accumulation throughout the tournament.

Argentina players were seen gloating to the Netherlands side immediately after Lautaro Martínez scored the winning penalty, with defender Nicolás Otamendi mimicking Messi's earlier gesture by cupping his hands around his ears while running in front of the Dutch players. Otamendi would explain that their reaction was in retaliation to the Netherlands players trying intimidation tactics during the penalty shoot-out. Several Dutch players responded to the Argentine celebrations by engaging in another physical altercation, where the referee sent off Dumfries for a second yellow card. Messi exchanged heated words with Netherlands manager Louis van Gaal after the final whistle. As Emiliano Martínez left the pitch, he shouted obscenities towards Van Gaal and the Netherlands bench.

=== Post-match comments ===
The Telegraph wrote that the post-match interviews continued the "aggressive" nature of the game, with Messi snapping at the Dutch camp as he talked. One incident saw Messi say "¿Qué mirás, bobo? ¿Qué mirás, bobo? Andá pa' allá, bobo, andá pa' allá" roughly translating to "What are you looking at, fool? What are you looking at, fool? Go away, fool, go away" toward Weghorst. The moment drew buzz on social media, spawning many Internet memes. Weghorst reportedly just wanted to shake Messi's hand, causing some media outlets to view Messi's comments toward him as verbally abusive or "unfair".

Messi would tell reporters after the match that he felt disrespected by Van Gaal's pre-match comments and stated, "some Dutch players spoke too much during the game". He further criticised the Netherlands' tactics in the second half, stating "Van Gaal says that they play good football, but what he did was put on tall people and hit long balls." Emiliano Martínez also said "I heard Van Gaal saying we've got an advantage in penalties, and if they go to penalties they win, I think he needs to keep his mouth shut."

Despite his comments, Messi later expressed regret for his actions during and after the match. He called them a result of several moments of tension between the two sides. Van Gaal, who resigned from the Netherlands team after exiting the tournament, would reignite the war of words several months later by expressing his belief that the tournament was premeditated for Argentina to win. However, Netherlands captain Virgil van Dijk distanced himself from Van Gaal's comments, and said that neither he nor the other Netherlands players stood behind their former manager in this regard.

== Reception ==
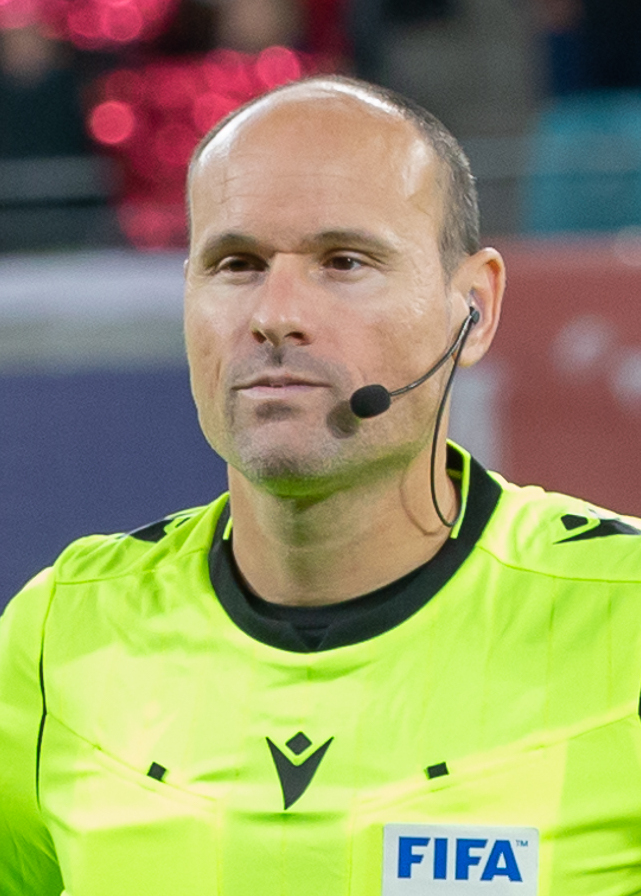
Match referee Antonio Mateu Lahoz received heavy criticism for his performance.

The game was noted by many football writers to be dramatic and hotly contested, with some labelling it as an "instant classic." (Note: Sources that share such an opinion include:) Several fans and reports of the game would refer to the match as The Battle of Lusail. (Note: Sources that refer to the match as such include:) Reporting on the game, Jason Burt of The Telegraph wrote, "it was feisty, downright dirty and with huge amounts of gamesmanship." The publication's Tom Morgan also wrote about the heated nature of the game: "on a feisty night full of tantrums, Argentina kept launching toys out of their pram even as Lautaro Martínez thrashed in his winner to send them through 4–3 on penalties."

The performance of referee Antonio Mateu Lahoz received heavy criticism, as he issued eighteen yellow cards, a record for World Cup matches, in addition to the red card during the match. Mateu Lahoz also overlooked a potential handball by Messi, while the length of the injury time added was considered excessive by some media outlets. Fans, pundits, and media alike considered a yellow card to be too lenient for some incidents. Criticism was also levied particularly at his decision to caution players while the penalty shoot-out was happening, after open-play had ended. BBC Sport's Emma Smith wrote in her match report that he "did not help matters, to be kind. To be unkind, he had an absolute shocker – brandishing his yellow card with abandon ratcheted up tensions considerably, and by the time he finally showed red to Dumfries, he had long since lost all control."

Smith also noted various players' unimpressed reactions to the referee. Messi would say that "[FIFA] can't put a referee who isn't up to the task for these instances," while Emiliano Martínez described Mateu Lahoz as "useless" and said "I thought we controlled the game really well, we went 2–0 up and the ref was giving everything for them. They get a good header, and then it turned upside down, the ref gave 10 minutes for no reason. He just wanted them to score, that was basically it, so hopefully we don't have that ref any more." Netherlands midfielder Frenkie de Jong called Mateu Lahoz "scandalous" and said "when regular playing time was over, the Argentina players all went to him and from then on he only whistled for Argentina. Jurrien Timber's shoe was kicked off, but then he whistled for a foul against us. Luuk [de Jong] just wins a normal header and he blows his whistle, they kick the ball into our dugout, he doesn't care. Messi takes the ball with his hand, just lets it go." CBS Sports reported that after the match, Mateu Lahoz had been sent home.

The match was further marred by the death of US sportswriter Grant Wahl after he collapsed near the end of the match while watching in the press box.

== See also ==
- Battle of Nuremberg
- Battle of Santiago
- Battle of Berne
- Battle of Bordeaux
- Argentina–Netherlands football rivalry
- Argentina at the FIFA World Cup
- Netherlands at the FIFA World Cup
