= 2002–03 Chelsea F.C. season =

English football club season

Chelsea
2002–03 season
- Chairman: Ken Bates
- Manager: Claudio Ranieri
- Premier League: 4th
- FA Cup: Quarter-final
- League Cup: Quarter-finals
- UEFA Cup: First round
- Top goalscorer: League: Gianfranco Zola (14); All: Gianfranco Zola (16)
- Average home league attendance: 39,784 (Premier League)
Home colours	Away colours	Third colours

The 2002–03 season was Chelsea's 89th competitive season, 11th consecutive season in the Premier League and 97th year as a club. The club was managed by Claudio Ranieri.

In the Premier League, Chelsea finished fourth behind Manchester United, Arsenal and Newcastle United. With the fourth-place finish, Chelsea secured a place in the UEFA Champions League third qualifying round. The final-day 2-1 home victory over Liverpool is commonly regarded as the most important game in Chelsea's history, as qualification for the Champions League meant that they were an attractive purchase target for the Russian oligarch Roman Abramovich, who bought the club on July 1, 2003

In the UEFA Cup, Chelsea took a first round exit, losing 5–4 on aggregate to Norwegian club Viking. Chelsea also managed to reach the quarter-finals of both the Football League Cup and the FA Cup, but lost 1–0 to Manchester United and 3–1 to Arsenal in a replay, respectively.

== Final league table ==
Pos	Team	Pld	W	D	L	GF	GA	GD	Pts	Qualification or relegation
2	Arsenal	38	23	9	6	85	42	+43	78	Qualification for the Champions League group stage
3	Newcastle United	38	21	6	11	63	48	+15	69	Qualification for the Champions League third qualifying round
4	Chelsea	38	19	10	9	68	38	+30	67	Qualification for the Champions League third qualifying round
5	Liverpool	38	18	10	10	61	41	+20	64	Qualification for the UEFA Cup first round (Note: Since Liverpool qualified for the UEFA Cup via the league, their place in the UEFA Cup as League Cup winners reverted to the league and was awarded to Blackburn Rovers as the highest-placed team not already qualified for European competitions.)
6	Blackburn Rovers	38	16	12	10	52	43	+9	60	Qualification for the UEFA Cup first round

Source: Premier League
Rules for classification: 1) points; 2) goal difference; 3) number of goals scored.

== First team squad ==
Squad at end of season

Note: Flags indicate national team as defined under FIFA eligibility rules; some limited exceptions apply. Players may hold more than one non-FIFA nationality.

No.	Pos.	Nation	Player
1	GK	NED	Ed de Goey
2	DF	ESP	Albert Ferrer
3	DF	NGR	Celestine Babayaro
6	DF	FRA	Marcel Desailly
7	DF	NED	Winston Bogarde
8	MF	ENG	Frank Lampard
9	FW	NED	Jimmy Floyd Hasselbaink
11	MF	NED	Boudewijn Zenden
12	MF	CRO	Mario Stanić
13	DF	FRA	William Gallas
14	DF	ENG	Graeme Le Saux
15	DF	NED	Mario Melchiot

No.	Pos.	Nation	Player
17	MF	FRA	Emmanuel Petit
20	MF	ENG	Jody Morris
21	MF	ESP	Enrique de Lucas
22	FW	ISL	Eiður Guðjohnsen
23	GK	ITA	Carlo Cudicini
25	FW	ITA	Gianfranco Zola
26	DF	ENG	John Terry
28	FW	POR	Filipe Oliveira
29	DF	GER	Robert Huth
30	MF	DEN	Jesper Grønkjær
36	MF	ENG	Joe Keenan
39	FW	ENG	Carlton Cole

=== Left club during season ===
Note: Flags indicate national team as defined under FIFA eligibility rules; some limited exceptions apply. Players may hold more than one non-FIFA nationality.

No.	Pos.	Nation	Player
31	GK	AUS	Mark Bosnich (released)

== Reserve squad ==
Note: Flags indicate national team as defined under FIFA eligibility rules; some limited exceptions apply. Players may hold more than one non-FIFA nationality.

No.	Pos.	Nation	Player
18	FW	GER	Sebastian Kneissl
19	DF	ITA	Valerio Di Cesare
24	MF	ITA	Gabriele Ambrosetti
27	MF	CYP	Alexis Nicolas
32	FW	FIN	Mikael Forssell
33	DF	ENG	Joel Kitamirike
34	DF	ENG	Scott Cousins
35	GK	ENG	Rhys Evans
37	MF	ENG	Danny Jeffreys
40	GK	ENG	Lenny Pidgeley
41	MF	SCO	Andy Ross

No.	Pos.	Nation	Player
42	MF	ENG	Billy Sentance
43	DF	ENG	Paul Thornton
44	DF	ENG	Sam Tillen
45	GK	ENG	Glenn Wizik
46	DF	ENG	Danny Woodards
—	DF	SCO	Warren Cummings
—	DF	POR	Mauro
—	DF	CIV	Jean-Yves Anis
—	MF	ENG	Rob Wolleaston
—	MF	NED	Mbark Boussoufa

== Team kit ==
The team kit was produced by Umbro. The shirt sponsor was the airline Emirates; the kit bore the "Fly Emirates" logo. Chelsea's home kit (all blue with a white trimmed collar) was carried over from the previous campaign. Their new away kit was all black with blue accents. The club's third kit for this season was the club's away kit from the previous season, all white with blue socks and accents.

== Statistics ==
No.	Pos	Nat	Player	Total		Premier League		UEFA Cup		FA Cup		Football League Cup	
No.	Pos	Nat	Player	Apps	Goals	Apps	Goals	Apps	Goals	Apps	Goals	Apps	Goals
1	GK	(Netherlands) NED	Ed de Goeij	3	0	2	0	0	0	0+1	0	0	0
2	DF	(Spain) ESP	Albert Ferrer	4	0	3	0	0	0	1	0	0	0
3	DF	(Nigeria) NGR	Celestine Babayaro	24	1	16+3	1	0	0	3	0	2	0
6	DF	(France) FRA	Marcel Desailly	33	2	30+1	2	1	0	1	0	0	0
7	DF	(Netherlands) NED	Winston Bogarde	1	0	0	0	0	0	0	0	0+1	0
8	MF	(England) ENG	Frank Lampard	48	8	37+1	6	1+1	1	5	1	3	0
9	FW	(Netherlands) NED	Jimmy Floyd Hasselbaink	44	15	27+9	11	2	1	4	1	2	2
11	MF	(Netherlands) NED	Boudewijn Zenden	27	1	11+10	1	0+1	0	1+3	0	0+1	0
12	MF	(Croatia) CRO	Mario Stanić	25	6	13+5	4	2	0	3	1	2	1
13	DF	(France) FRA	William Gallas	48	4	36+2	4	2	0	5	0	3	0
14	DF	(England) ENG	Graeme Le Saux	34	2	27+1	2	1	0	3	0	2	0
15	DF	(Netherlands) NED	Mario Melchiot	41	0	31+3	0	0	0	4+1	0	2	0
17	MF	(France) FRA	Emmanuel Petit	31	2	23+1	1	1	0	5	0	1	1
20	MF	(England) ENG	Jody Morris	33	1	19+6	0	1+1	0	2+1	1	2+1	0
21	MF	(Spain) ESP	Enrique de Lucas	31	1	17+8	0	1	1	1+1	0	2+1	0
22	FW	(Iceland) ISL	Eiður Guðjohnsen	44	10	20+15	10	1+1	0	3+2	0	0+2	0
23	GK	(Italy) ITA	Carlo Cudicini	46	0	36	0	2	0	5	0	3	0
25	FW	(Italy) ITA	Gianfranco Zola	46	16	30+8	14	2	0	3	2	3	0
26	DF	(England) ENG	John Terry	30	5	16+4	3	2	0	5	2	3	0
28	MF	(Portugal) POR	Filipe Oliveira	5	0	0+3	0	0+1	0	0	0	0+1	0
29	DF	(Germany) GER	Robert Huth	5	0	2	0	2	0	0+1	0	0	0
30	MF	(Denmark) DEN	Jesper Grønkjær	39	5	20+10	4	2	0	2+3	1	1+1	0
36	MF	(England) ENG	Joe Keenan	1	0	0+1	0	0	0	0	0	0	0
39	FW	(England) ENG	Carlton Cole	16	6	2+11	3	0	0	0+2	1	1	2

Statistics taken from. Squad details and shirt numbers from and .

== Results ==
=== FA Premier League ===
17 August 2002 1	Charlton Athletic	2–3	Chelsea	London
15:00 BST	Konchesky 7' (red card) 24'; Rufus 33'	Report	Zola 43'; C. Cole 84'; Lampard 89'; Babayaro (yellow card) 89'; Desailly (yellow card) 89'; Zenden (yellow card) 89'	Stadium: The Valley; Attendance: 25,640; Referee: Graham Barber

23 August 2002 2	Chelsea	2–2	Manchester United	London
20:00 BST	Gallas 3'; Zenden 45'; Hasselbaink (yellow card) 84'; Desailly (yellow card) 89'; De Lucas (yellow card) 89'	Report	Beckham 26' (yellow card) 89'; Giggs 65'; P. Neville (yellow card) 89'	Stadium: Stamford Bridge; Attendance: 41,541; Referee: Graham Poll

28 August 2002 3	Southampton	1–1	Chelsea	Southampton
19:45 BST	Fernandes 51'; Svensson (yellow card) 89'; Telfer (yellow card) 89'	Report	Lampard 80'; Babayaro (yellow card) 89'; Grønkjær (yellow card) 89'	Stadium: St. Mary's Stadium; Attendance: 31,208; Referee: Chris Foy

1 September 2002 4	Chelsea	1–1	Arsenal	London
16:05 BST	Melchiot (yellow card) 24'; Zola 34'; Zenden (yellow card) 45'; Le Saux (yellow card) 64'; De Lucas (yellow card) 89'; Lampard (yellow card) 89'; Grønkjær (yellow card) 89'	Report	Vieira (red card) 49'; Touré 59'; Wiltord (yellow card) 88'	Stadium: Stamford Bridge; Attendance: 40,037; Referee: Andy D'Urso

11 September 2002 5	Blackburn Rovers	2–3	Chelsea	Blackburn
20:00 BST	Dunn 18' (pen.); Thompson 45' (yellow card) 89'; Johansson (yellow card) 81'	Report	Grønkjær 38'; Zola 52' 80'; Stanic (yellow card) 71'; Morris (yellow card) 86'; Babayaro (yellow card) 89'	Stadium: Ewood Park; Attendance: 22,999; Referee: Michael Riley

14 September 2002 6	Chelsea	3–0	Newcastle United	London
15:00 BST	Gudjohnsen 14' 58'; Zola 26'; Zenden (yellow card) 89'	Report	Solano (yellow card) 76'; Shearer (yellow card) 89'; Speed (yellow card) 89'; Bernard (yellow card) 89'	Stadium: Stamford Bridge; Attendance: 39,746; Referee: Barry Knight

23 September 2002 7	Fulham	0–0	Chelsea	London
20:00 BST	Ouaddou (yellow card) 89'	Report		Stadium: Loftus Road; Attendance: 16,503; Referee: Paul Durkin

28 September 2002 8	Chelsea	2–3	West Ham United	London
15:00 BST	Hasselbaink 21' (pen.); Zola 74'; Huth (yellow card) 89'	Report	Defoe 40'; Di Canio 48' 84'; Minto (yellow card) 89'; Repka (yellow card) 89'; Lomas (yellow card) 89'	Stadium: Stamford Bridge; Attendance: 38,929; Referee: Mike Dean

6 October 2002 9	Liverpool	1–0	Chelsea	Liverpool
16:05 BST	Owen 90'	Report	Stanic (yellow card) 71'; Grønkjær (yellow card) 89'	Stadium: Anfield; Attendance: 43,856; Referee: Graham Barber

19 October 2002 10	Manchester City	0–3	Chelsea	Manchester
15:00 BST	Benarbia (yellow card) 89'	Report	Zola 68' 84'; Hasselbaink 85'; Lampard (yellow card) 89'; De Lucas (yellow card) 89'	Stadium: Maine Road; Attendance: 34,953; Referee: Dermot Gallagher

26 October 2002 11	Chelsea	2–0	West Bromwich Albion	London
15:00 BST	Hasselbaink 30'; Le Saux 55'	Report	Johnson (yellow card) 89'	Stadium: Stamford Bridge; Attendance: 40,893; Referee: Stephen Dunn

3 November 2002 12	Tottenham Hotspur	0–0	Chelsea	London
15:00 BST	Acimovic (yellow card) 16'; Sheringham (yellow card) 88'; Keller (yellow card) 89'	Report	De Lucas (yellow card) 86'; Morris (yellow card) 89'	Stadium: White Hart Lane; Attendance: 36,049; Referee: Mark Halsey

9 November 2002 13	Chelsea	3–0	Birmingham City	London
15:00 BST	Gudjohnsen 3' 31'; Zola 42'; Desailly (yellow card) 75'	Report	Powell (yellow card) 42'	Stadium: Stamford Bridge; Attendance: 35,237; Referee: David Pugh

16 November 2002 14	Chelsea	1–0	Middlesbrough	London
16:00 BST	Babayaro 47'; Melchiot (yellow card) 89'	Report	Boateng (yellow card) 89'	Stadium: Stamford Bridge; Attendance: 39,064; Referee: Phil Dowd

23 November 2002 15	Bolton Wanderers	1–1	Chelsea	Bolton
15:00 BST	Tøfting (yellow card) 44'; Pedersen 63'; Barness (yellow card) 89'	Report	Hasselbaink (yellow card) 44' (goal) 89'; Babayaro (red card) 75'; Desailly (yellow card) 89'; Melchiot (yellow card) 89'	Stadium: Macron Stadium; Attendance: 25,476; Referee: Mike Dean

30 November 2002 16	Chelsea	3–0	Sunderland	London
16:00 BST	Gallas 58'; Desailly 84'; Hasselbaink 89'	Report	Kilbane (yellow card) 70'; Thirlwell (yellow card) 89'; McCann (yellow card) 89'	Stadium: Stamford Bridge; Attendance: 38,946; Referee: Stephen Bennett

7 December 2002 17	Everton	1–3	Chelsea	Liverpool
16:00 BST	Naysmith 44'; Unsworth (red card) 88'; Stubbs (yellow card) 89'	Report	Stanic 5' (yellow card) 60'; Hasselbaink 28' (yellow card) 83'; Grønkjær (yellow card) 28' (goal) 90'; De Lucas (yellow card) 75'; Gallas (yellow card) 89'; Lampard (yellow card) 89'	Stadium: Goodison Park; Attendance: 39,396; Referee: Eddie Wolstenholme

14 December 2002 18	Middlesbrough	1–1	Chelsea	Middlesbrough
16:00 BST	Geremi 32'	Report	Terry 42'; Petit (yellow card) 89'	Stadium: Riverside Stadium; Attendance: 29,160; Referee: Matt Messias

21 December 2002 19	Chelsea	2–0	Aston Villa	London
16:00 BST	Gudjohnsen 42'; Lampard 57'	Report	Dublin (yellow card) 60'; Hendrie (yellow card) 89'; Staunton (yellow card) 89'	Stadium: Stamford Bridge; Attendance: 38,284; Referee: Michael Riley

26 December 2002 20	Chelsea	0–0	Southampton	London
13:00 BST	Melchiot (yellow card) 85'	Report	Bridge (yellow card) 89'; Fernandes (yellow card) 89'	Stadium: Stamford Bridge; Attendance: 39,428; Referee: Paul Durkin

28 December 2002 21	Leeds United	2–0	Chelsea	Leeds
16:00 BST	Gallas 30' (o.g.); Milner 45'; Okon (yellow card) 45'; Smith (yellow card) 89'	Report		Stadium: Elland Road; Attendance: 40,122; Referee: Graham Barber

1 January 2003 22	Arsenal	3–2	Chelsea	London
16:00 BST	Desailly 8' (o.g.) van Bronckhorst 81'; Henry 83'	Report	Stanic 85'; Petit 86'	Stadium: Highbury; Attendance: 38,096; Referee: Uriah Rennie

11 January 2003 23	Chelsea	4–1	Charlton Athletic	London
15:00 BST	Hasselbaink 3' (pen.); Gallas 11'; Gudjohnsen 34' (yellow card) 89'; Le Saux 54' (yellow card) 78'; Petit (yellow card) 89'; Desailly (yellow card) 89'	Report	Euell 42' (pen.); Powell (yellow card) 44'; Parker (yellow card) 89'; Konchesky (yellow card) 89'	Stadium: Stamford Bridge; Attendance: 37,284; Referee: Mike Dean

18 January 2003 24	Manchester United	2–1	Chelsea	Manchester
13:30 BST	Scholes 39'; Forlán 90'	Report	Gudjohnsen 30'	Stadium: Old Trafford; Attendance: 67,606; Referee: Paul Durkin

28 January 2003 25	Chelsea	3–2	Leeds United	London
15:00 BST	C. Cole (yellow card) 53'; Gudjohnsen 57'; Lampard 80'; Matteo 83' (o.g.); Le Saux (yellow card) 89'	Report	Kewell 18'; Lucic 66'; Bakke (yellow card) 89'	Stadium: Stamford Bridge; Attendance: 39,738; Referee: Jeff Winter

1 February 2003 26	Chelsea	1–1	Tottenham Hotspur	London
16:00 BST	Zola 40'; Petit (yellow card) 89'	Report	Sheringham 17'; Taricco (yellow card) 89'	Stadium: Stamford Bridge; Attendance: 41,384; Referee: Paul Durkin

8 February 2003 27	Birmingham City	1–3	Chelsea	Birmingham
16:00 BST	Savage 86' (pen.); Johnson (yellow card) 89'	Report	De Lucas (yellow card) 15'; Zola 43'; Gudjohnsen 49'; Hasselbaink 68' (pen.); Terry (yellow card) 89'; Desailly (yellow card) 89'	Stadium: St Andrew's; Attendance: 29,475; Referee: Mark Halsey

22 February 2003 28	Chelsea	1–2	Blackburn Rovers	London
16:00 BST	Stanic (yellow card) 64'; Gallas (yellow card) 89'; Hasselbaink 90'	Report	Yorke 85'; Gresko (yellow card) 89'; Dunn 90'	Stadium: Stamford Bridge; Attendance: 40,850; Referee: Graham Poll

1 March 2003 29	Newcastle United	2–1	Chelsea	Newcastle
13:30 BST	Hasselbaink 31' (o.g.); Bernard 53'	Report	C. Cole (yellow card) 12'; Lampard 37'	Stadium: St. James' Park; Attendance: 52,157; Referee: Brian Winter

16 March 2003 30	West Bromwich Albion	0–2	Chelsea	West Bromwich
17:05 BST		Report	Stanic 38'; Zola 55'	Stadium: The Hawthorns; Attendance: 27,024; Referee: Andy D'Urso

22 March 2003 31	Chelsea	5–0	Manchester City	London
17:05 BST	Hasselbaink 37'; Terry 42' (yellow card) 89'; Stanic 58'; Lampard 69'; Gallas 79'	Report	Benarbia (yellow card) 89'; Distin (yellow card) 89'; Jihai (red card) 89'	Stadium: Stamford Bridge; Attendance: 41,105; Referee: Phil Dowd

5 April 2003 32	Sunderland	1–2	Chelsea	Sunderland
15:00 BST	Thornton 12'; El Karkouri (yellow card) 89'	Report	C. Cole (yellow card) 44' (goal) 85'; Zola 52'	Stadium: Stadium of Light; Attendance: 27,024; Referee: Dermot Gallagher

12 April 2003 33	Chelsea	1–0	Bolton Wanderers	London
15:00 BST	C. Cole 58'; Zenden (yellow card) 58'	Report	Bergsson (yellow card) 89'; Laville (yellow card) 89'	Stadium: Stamford Bridge; Attendance: 39,852; Referee: Graham Barber

19 April 2003 34	Aston Villa	2–1	Chelsea	Birmingham
15:00 BST	Allbäck 11' 78'; Leonhardsen (yellow card) 89'	Report	Terry 89'	Stadium: Villa Park; Attendance: 39,358; Referee: Rob Styles

21 April 2003 35	Chelsea	4–1	Everton	London
15:00 BST	Gudjohnsen 25'; Hasselbaink 48'; Grønkjær 61'; De Lucas (yellow card) 89'; Zola 90'	Report	Gravesen (yellow card) 36'; Carsley 77'	Stadium: Stamford Bridge; Attendance: 40,875; Referee: Michael Riley

26 April 2003 36	Chelsea	1–1	Fulham	London
15:00 BST	Goma 37' (o.g.); Grønkjær (yellow card) 58'; Petit (yellow card) 89'	Report	Boa Morte 66' (yellow card) 82'; Clark (yellow card) 89'	Stadium: Stamford Bridge; Attendance: 40,792; Referee: David Elleray

3 May 2003 37	West Ham United	1–0	Chelsea	London
15:00 BST	Di Canio 71'; Defoe (yellow card) 89'; Repka (yellow card) 89'; Sinclair (yellow card) 89'	Report	Morris (yellow card) 76'	Stadium: Boleyn Ground; Attendance: 35,042; Referee: Andy D'Urso

11 May 2003 38	Chelsea	2–1	Liverpool	London
15:00 BST	Desailly 13'; Grønkjær 27'; Hasselbaink (yellow card) 79'; Gallas (yellow card) 89'; Le Saux (yellow card) 89'	Report	Hyypiä 11'; Gerrard (red card) 88'	Stadium: Stamford Bridge; Attendance: 41,911; Referee: Alan Wiley

=== UEFA Cup ===
==== First Round ====
19 September 2002 First leg	Chelsea (England)	2–1	(Norway) Viking FK	London
18:00 GMT	Hasselbaink 43'; De Lucas 69'	Report	Wright 90'	Stadium: Stamford Bridge; Attendance: 15,772; Referee: Ben Tokat (Turkey)

3 October 2002 Second leg	Viking FK (Norway)	4–2	(England) Chelsea	Stavanger, Norway
18:00 GMT	Berre 9'; Kopteff 34'; Nevland 60' 87'	Report	Lampard 45'; Terry 62'	Stadium: Stavanger Stadion; Attendance: 5,555; Referee: Jack Van Hulten (Netherlands)

=== FA Cup ===
4 January 2003 Third round	Chelsea	1–0	Middlesbrough	London
15:00	Stanic 38'; Cudicini (red card) 64'	Report		Stadium: Stamford Bridge; Attendance: 29,796; Referee: Mark Halsey

26 January 2003 Fourth round	Shrewsbury Town	0–4	Chelsea	Shrewsbury
21:00		Report	Zola 40' 75'; C. Cole 53'; Morris 80'	Stadium: Gay Meadow; Attendance: 7,950; Referee: Michael Riley

16 February 2003 Fifth round	Stoke City	0–2	Chelsea	Stoke-on-Trent
16:00		Report	Hasselbaink 51'; Grønkjær 75'	Stadium: Bet365 Stadium; Attendance: 26,615; Referee: Rob Styles

8 March 2003 Quarter final	Arsenal	2–2	Chelsea	London
17:00	Jeffers 35'; Henry 45'	Report	Terry 3'; Lampard 83'	Stadium: Highbury Stadium; Attendance: 38,104; Referee: Paul Durkin

25 March 2003 Quarter final replay	Chelsea	1–3	Arsenal	London
15:00	Terry 79'	Report	Terry 25' (o.g.); Wiltord 33'; Cygan (red card) 66'; Lauren 82'	Stadium: Stamford Bridge; Attendance: 41,456; Referee: David Elleray

=== League Cup ===
6 November 2002 Third round	Chelsea	2–1	Gillingham	London
20:00	C. Cole 20' 52'	Report	King 90'	Stadium: Stamford Bridge; Attendance: 28,033; Referee: Andy D'Urso

4 December 2002 Fourth round	Chelsea	4–1	Everton	London
19:30	Hasselbaink 26' 71'; Petit 44'; Stanic 69'	Report	Naysmith 80'	Stadium: Stamford Bridge; Attendance: 32,322; Referee: Paul Durkin

17 December 2002 Fifth round	Manchester United	1–0	Chelsea	Manchester
20:00	Forlan 80'	Report		Stadium: Old Trafford; Attendance: 57,985; Referee: Steve Bennett

== Transfers ==
=== In ===
#	Pos	Player	From	Fee	Date
21	MF	(Spain) Enrique de Lucas	(Spain) Espanyol	Free	27-05-2002
28	FW	(Portugal) Filipe Oliveira	(Portugal) Porto	£500,000	01-10-2002

=== Out ===
#	Pos	Player	To	Fee	Date
16	MF	(Italy) Roberto Di Matteo	N/A	Retired	01-07-2002
24	MF	(Italy) Samuele Dalla Bona	(Italy) Milan	£1,000,000	08-07-2002
10	MF	(Serbia and Montenegro) Slaviša Jokanović	Unattached	Released	09-07-2002
N/A	FW	(Scotland) Sam Parkin	(England) Swindon Town	Undisclosed	03-09-2002
31	GK	(Australia) Mark Bosnich	Unattached	Released	22-01-2003
32	FW	(Finland) Mikael Forssell	(Germany) Borussia Mönchengladbach	6-month loan	29-01-2003
