= Phillip Cocu =

Dutch footballer and manager (born 1970)

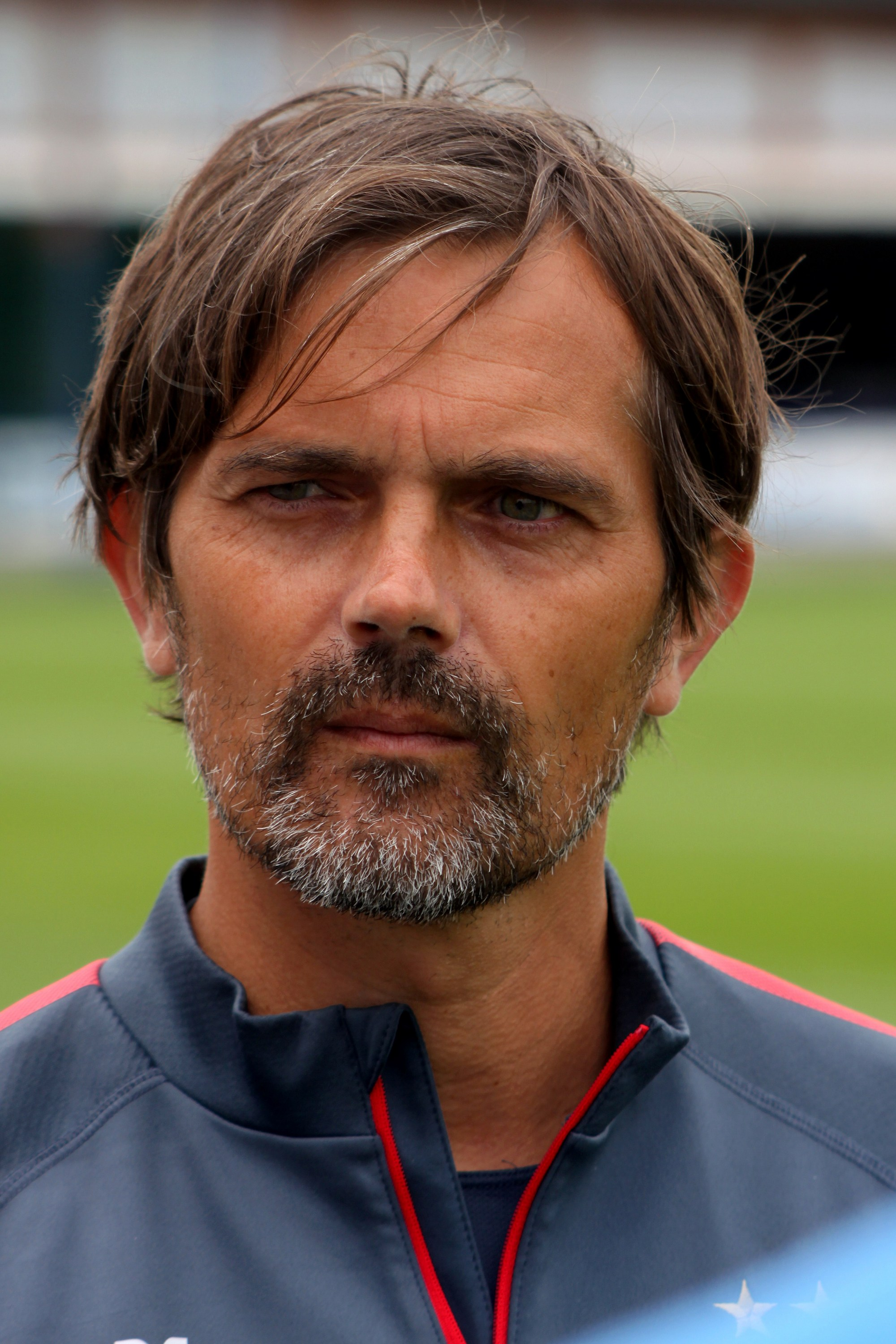
- Cocu in 2014

Personal information
- Full name: Phillip John-William Cocu
- Date of birth: 29 October 1970 (age 56)
- Place of birth: Eindhoven, Netherlands
- Height: 1.82 m (6 ft 0 in)
- Position: Midfielder

Senior career*
Years	Team	Apps	(Gls)
1988–1990	AZ	50	(8)
1990–1995	Vitesse	137	(25)
1995–1998	PSV	95	(31)
1998–2004	Barcelona	205	(31)
2004–2007	PSV	94	(23)
2007–2008	Al Jazira	17	(4)
Total		598	(122)

International career
1996–2006	Netherlands	101	(10)

Managerial career
- 2008–2012: Netherlands (assistant)
- 2012: PSV (caretaker)
- 2013–2018: PSV
- 2018: Fenerbahçe
- 2019–2020: Derby County
- 2022–2023: Vitesse
Medal record
Men's football
Representing Netherlands
UEFA European Championship
Bronze medal – third place	2000
Bronze medal – third place	2004
- * Club domestic league appearances and goals

Phillip John-William Cocu (born 29 October 1970) is a Dutch professional football manager and former midfielder who was most recently the manager of Vitesse.

Cocu was born in Eindhoven and raised in Zevenaar, where he played playing youth football for local clubs DCS and De Graafschap. After a year at AFC '34, he started his professional career at AZ. In 1990, Cocu moved to Vitesse. A broken fibula disrupted his first season, but he became a first-team regular in the following four seasons. In 1995, he joined PSV, winning the KNVB Cup and the Eredivisie title in 1997. Cocu played for Barcelona between 1998 and 2004. There, he would become club captain, win La Liga in 1999 and play two Champions League semi-finals. He left the club in 2004 as club record holder for the most league appearances by a foreign player. During Cocu's second stint at PSV, he won another three Eredivisie titles and reached the Champions League semi-finals. After a year at Al Jazira, Cocu retired from professional football.

Cocu debuted for the Netherlands national team in 1996 and appeared at the 1998 World Cup, scoring two goals but missing a penalty in the semi-finals against Brazil. He also played at the 2006 World Cup, as well as the 1996, 2000 and 2004 European Championships. Cocu reached the semi-finals in the latter two tournaments and in 2004, he served as captain of the Dutch team. With 101 caps, Cocu is eighth on the list of most Dutch international appearances. During his career, he mainly played as a defensive "playmaker" in midfield, but became equally known for his ability to be fielded as a defender, wing back, winger or forward.

After his retirement from playing professional football, Cocu joined PSV again as youth coach and later assistant manager. He also served as assistant at the Dutch team under Bert van Marwijk between 2008 and 2012. Cocu was caretaker manager at PSV in 2012, during which he won the KNVB Cup. In 2013, he was officially appointed as PSV manager, and won three league titles in his five years at the club.

== Early career ==
Cocu was born in Eindhoven, but he and his family moved to Zevenaar when he was three years old after his father switched jobs. He started playing youth football at the local amateur club DCS when he was six. Even though youth players normally were not allowed to play until they were seven, the team made an exception for Cocu. He played for DCS until he was picked up by De Graafschap's youth academy. After a short period, he moved to AFC '34 in 1986. A year later, his talent was again noticed by a professional club and in June 1987, Cocu joined the AZ youth ranks.

== Club career ==
=== Early years ===
Cocu began in the AZ reserve squad but was soon added to the first team. He made his professional debut on 22 January 1989, when assistant coach Hugo Hovenkamp (replacing the bedridden manager Hans Eijkenbroek) brought him on in an Eerste Divisie match against NEC. The 18-year-old played as left winger at the time. Cocu scored his first goal two weeks later in a cup match against Fortuna Sittard, followed up by his first league goal in March against SVV. He would go on and score four goals in his first season. In the 1989-90 season, he appeared in nearly every league match. After the competition ended, Cocu was sold to the newly promoted Vitesse for €272,000.

Cocu played only eight matches in his first Vitesse season after he suffered a broken fibula. He had a more productive second season, playing most matches and scoring three times. He netted his first Vitesse goal in August 1991 in a match against ADO Den Haag. In Arnhem, Cocu changed from being a left winger to a central midfielder. Coach Herbert Neumann envisioned a leading central role for Cocu in 1991 and placed him on the midfield position. In 1992, Cocu played his first European match when Vitesse faced Derry City. After Vitesse defeated Derry City, they beat Belgian side Mechelen in the following round. The away match was decided by a long-range effort from Cocu (1–0). Vitesse was eventually knocked out by Real Madrid. In the Eredivisie, the team finished in fourth place. Cocu also played all league matches and doubled his goal tally in his third season. In the 1993–94 season, Cocu scored 11 Eredivisie goals, including three in a 5–0 victory over Go Ahead Eagles in December. After the season, Louis van Gaal and Ajax became interested in buying Cocu, but they could not meet the transfer fee demands. A year later, PSV and Feyenoord triggered the release clause in Cocu's contract, making Vitesse unable to reject the offer. He eventually chose to play for PSV.

Cocu was signed in June 1995 in a joint-transfer with Chris van der Weerden. He scored in his PSV debut against Fortuna Sittard (1–3). In his first season, he won the KNVB Cup with PSV. In the final against Sparta Rotterdam (5–2), Cocu scored the first goal. In October 1996, Cocu scored twice in a 7–2 win against Feyenoord. That season, Cocu and PSV would go on to win the Johan Cruyff Shield, beating Ajax 3–0, and the Eredivisie. In the 1997–98 season, Cocu won the Johan Cruyff Shield again after scoring twice in a 3–1 victory against Roda JC. In the Eredivisie, PSV finished second behind Ajax. The KNVB Cup final was also lost to Ajax (5–0). After the season, Cocu decided not to extend his contract, demonstrating his intent to leave on a free transfer. Atlético Madrid, Real Madrid, Juventus, Inter Milan and Lazio were all keen on signing Cocu, but he ultimately chose to join Barcelona, the club he supported as a child.

=== Barcelona ===
In Barcelona, Cocu found himself with fellow Dutchmen Louis van Gaal, Michael Reiziger, Frank de Boer, Patrick Kluivert, Boudewijn Zenden, Ronald de Boer and Winston Bogarde. Forming a midfield with Luís Figo and Pep Guardiola, Cocu played 36 league matches and scored 12 goals, thereby contributing to Barcelona's La Liga title win. In March, Cocu decided the match against Real Sociedad by scoring both goals (2–0). In his second season, the team finished second in the league behind Deportivo de La Coruña. Cocu scored six league goals, including two against Real Oviedo (a 3–2 win) and two against Athletic Bilbao (a 4–0 win). Barcelona and Cocu reached the Champions League semi-finals, where they were knocked-out by Valencia. Cocu scored the final goal in the return leg. In 2000, Van Gaal left and was succeeded by Lorenzo Serra Ferrer and Carles Rexach. But, in the following two seasons, the team performances declined even more, with Barcelona twice ending fourth in the league.

In 2001, Pep Guardiola left Barcelona, making space for a new midfield consisting of Cocu, Xavi and Gabri. In the 2001–02 season, Barcelona reached the Champions League semi-finals again, but were denied the final by Real Madrid. In 2002, the returning coach Louis van Gaal chose Cocu as vice-captain behind Luis Enrique. The 2002–03 season was Barcelona's worst in years, however: the team finished sixth in La Liga, Van Gaal was fired early on and Cocu tore his knee ligament in a Champions League match against Inter Milan (0–0) in February. He was sidelined for two months. Weeks earlier, Barcelona had already beat Inter 3–0, with a goal by Cocu. With his contract expiring in 2003, he waited until after the Barcelona presidential elections to make a decision on extension. Cocu, who intended to join PSV if the negotiations failed, eventually agreed on a one-year extension in June.

The 2003–04 season began with new coach Frank Rijkaard. Cocu scored Barcelona's first goal of the league season, deciding the match against Athletic Bilbao (1–0). He played 36 league matches in total and also frequently served as the team captain. Barcelona finished second in La Liga. In early 2004, Barça announced it would not renew Cocu's contract. Both parties could not agree on a new deal after he did not accept Barcelona's significantly-lowered offer. Cocu was disappointed by the club's decision, but was happy to return to PSV, whose offer always remained. After his departure, he was awarded a plaque for his loyalty by club president Joan Laporta. Cocu's 205 La Liga matches and 291 total appearances were Barcelona records for a foreign player when he left; both records remained until Lionel Messi surpassed them in 2011 and 2012 respectively.

=== PSV and Al-Jazira ===
In 2004, Cocu signed a two-year contract with PSV. He formed a midfield with Johann Vogel and captain Mark van Bommel in a side that won the Eredivisie, the KNVB Cup and reached the Champions League semi-finals in the 2004–05 season. In the Champions League, Cocu scored the PSV away goal in the quarter-final match against Lyon (1–1). PSV reached the semi-finals, but were ultimately eliminated by Milan. After losing the away leg 2–0, PSV went 2–0 ahead in the return game with a goal by Cocu. A goal by Milan's Massimo Ambrosini, however, ended the hope to reach the finals, despite an injury-time second goal by Cocu. In the domestic league, Cocu missed the title-winning match against Vitesse after a sending-off in the previous match. He was handed his second yellow card against Willem II after being provoked by Martijn Reuser.

When Mark van Bommel left PSV in 2005, Cocu was handed the role of captain by manager Guus Hiddink. PSV won the league title again and reached the second round of the Champions League, where they were eliminated by Lyon. Cocu was sent off in the return match. For his league performances, Cocu won the Zilveren Schoen as the second-best Eredivisie player that year. After the 2005–06 season, Cocu signed a one-year contract extension with PSV. The team started the 2006–07 season well, but the performances heavily declined in the second half of the season and the title was almost lost. The championship was to be decided on the last league round, with PSV facing Vitesse. PSV won the match 5–1, with Cocu scoring the final goal. This goal eventually decided the title race: the goal difference between PSV and runners-up Ajax was one goal, just enough for the Eredivisie title win.

Cocu was close to announcing his retirement after the 2006–07 season, but still received offers from Australia and Al Jazira Club. After consulting Al Jazira's Abe Knoop and László Jámbor (who worked for Ajax), he chose to sign a one-year deal with the club from the United Arab Emirates in August 2007. In his first match, played against Al Wasl, he immediately scored in the team's 2–1 victory. With Al-Jazira, Cocu appeared in 17 league matches and scored four goals. After the season ended, Cocu considered staying for another year, but ultimately chose to return to the Netherlands in time for the professional football coach course. In July 2009, Cocu received a testimonial match from PSV at the Philips Stadion. An all-star team consisting of Luís Figo, Edgar Davids, Frank de Boer and many other former players competed against the PSV first team.

== International career ==
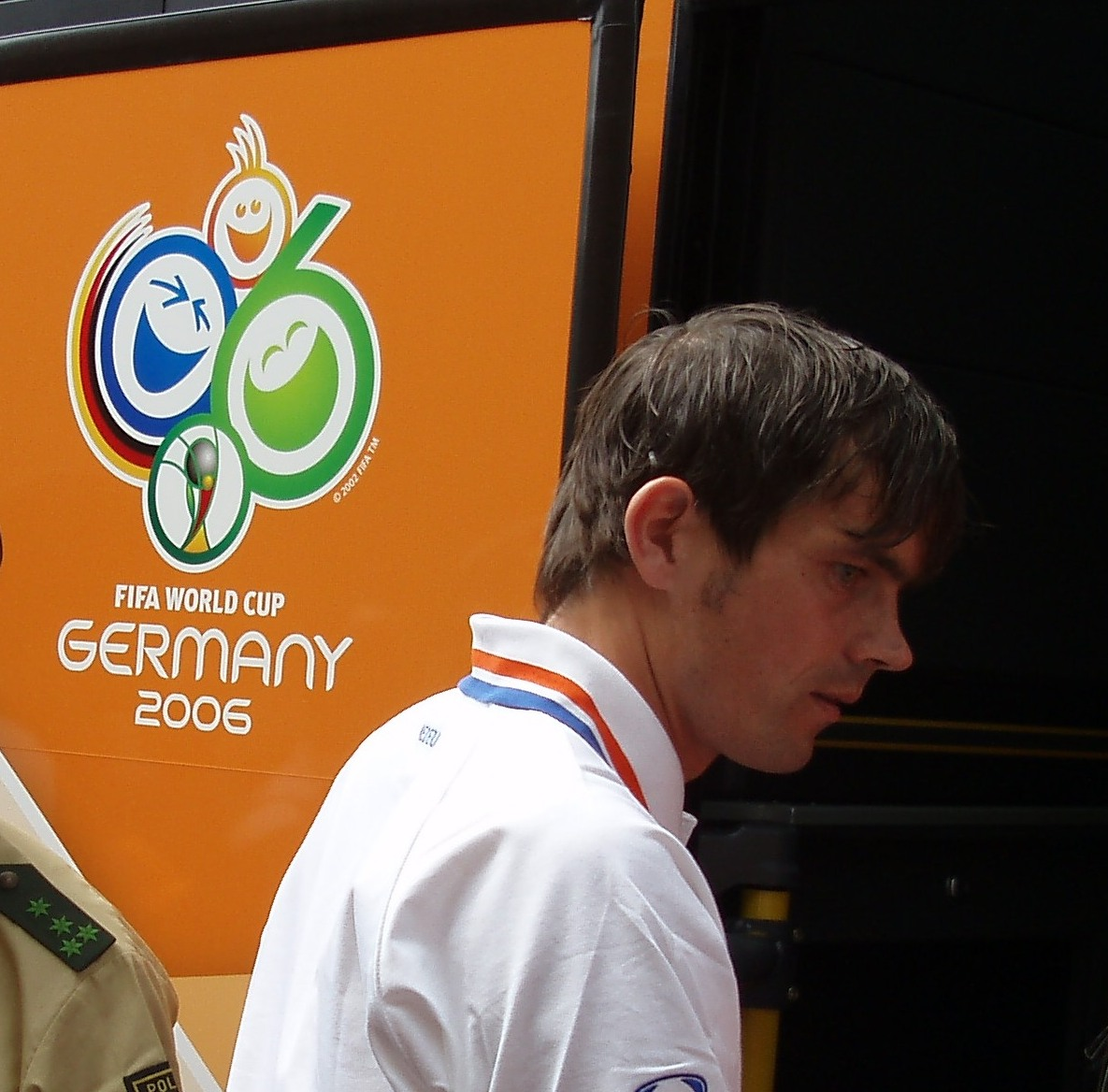
Cocu with the Netherlands during the 2006 World Cup

Cocu was close to his international debut in 1994. Coach Dick Advocaat listed him on the 25-man provisional squad for the 1994 World Cup due to his performances at Vitesse, but he eventually did not make the team. His international debut came at age 25 in early 1996 in an exhibition match against Germany, handed to him by Guus Hiddink. Cocu scored his first international goal against the Republic of Ireland in June. Cocu was called up for Euro 1996 by Hiddink. He appeared as a substitute in two group stage matches and was included in the first team for the quarter-final defeat against France. Two years later, the Dutch team qualified for the 1998 World Cup, with Cocu having secured his place as a first-team member. He appeared in all World Cup matches, while scoring in the group stage matches against South Korea and Mexico. In the semi-final against Brazil, the match went to a penalty shoot-out. Cocu took the third Dutch penalty, but his attempt was saved by Cláudio Taffarel. The Netherlands eventually lost the shoot-out (4–2) and missed out on the final.

Cocu and the Netherlands were present at Euro 2000 after automatically qualifying as a host. The Dutch side, with Cocu in all fixtures, won all group matches and the quarter-final against Yugoslavia. Still, Cocu and the team were again eliminated after a penalty shoot-out in the semi-finals, this time against Italy. The Netherlands and Cocu failed to qualify for the 2002 World Cup in a qualification group with Portugal and the Republic of Ireland. In 2003, Cocu received his first international sending-off in a friendly match against Belgium. The Netherlands did well in the Euro 2004 qualifiers, with Cocu scoring twice (both in separate matches against Austria). During Euro 2004, Cocu was chosen as team captain and appeared in all matches. In the quarter-finals against Sweden, he missed a penalty in the shoot-out, but the Netherlands still managed to win. In the semi-finals, the team was eliminated by hosts Portugal. After Euro 2004, Cocu lost the captain role to Edgar Davids, a decision made by new manager Marco van Basten.

The Netherlands qualified for the 2006 World Cup, with Cocu scoring three times in the qualifying matches. Cocu was a first-team member in most games, but a sending-off against Andorra in September 2005 meant that Cocu missed the last two qualifiers. At the World Cup, the Netherlands progressed from the group stage, but were knocked out by Portugal in the second round, with Cocu coming close to equalizing by hitting the crossbar shortly after the start of the second half. After the tournament, Cocu retired from international football. With 101 caps for the Netherlands, Cocu is currently ranked fifth in the list of most Dutch international appearances. He was granted a farewell and a golden plaque for his services before the match against Belarus in September 2006. In 2011, Cocu was named bondsridder of the Royal Dutch Football Association (KNVB), an honorary title for his service to Dutch football.

== Style of play ==
Cocu played as a defender, midfielder and forward, later noting that he never played as a full-back on the right or as a goalkeeper.

== Managerial career ==
=== PSV Eindhoven ===
After Cocu's return from the UAE in 2008, he showed interest in becoming a football coach. He joined the professional football coach course to achieve the necessary coaching badges and returned to PSV to assist in several youth squads. Cocu was also immediately appointed second assistant of Bert van Marwijk, who became manager of the Netherlands national team. Later, his role at PSV changed to assisting Ernest Faber at the PSV under-19 squad and becoming a trainee for the PSV first team under Huub Stevens in late 2008. After Stevens resigned in January 2009, Cocu became the assistant manager under caretaker manager Dwight Lodeweges. After the season finished, he continued to be part-time available for the first team. In February 2010, he passed his coaching exam, enabling him to be a manager in the Netherlands. A month later, Cocu agreed to remain assistant manager for the Dutch national team for another two years. With the Netherlands, he was present at the 2010 World Cup, where the team lost the final against Spain.

In December 2010, Cocu was promoted to first assistant manager at the Dutch national team after Frank de Boer became manager of Ajax. In the summer of 2011, Cocu signed a new two-year contract with PSV. When Fred Rutten was dismissed as PSV manager in March 2012, Cocu was appointed as caretaker manager for the remainder of the season. Faber joined PSV from FC Eindhoven to serve as Cocu's assistant. During his few months as manager, he promoted youngster Memphis Depay to the first team and replaced Andreas Isaksson with Przemysław Tytoń as the side's starting goalkeeper. The results did not improve, however, and after a 2–1 home defeat against RKC Waalwijk, Cocu vocally forfeited the title race. Despite winning the last five games in a row, Cocu and PSV finished third in the league, therefore missing out on Champions League football. Nonetheless, the team won the KNVB Cup by beating Heracles Almelo 3–0 in the final.

For the 2012–13 season, the PSV board appointed Dick Advocaat as the new manager. Eager to gain more experience in coaching a team, Cocu took up the position of the PSV under-19 coach. He also gave up his job as assistant manager at the Dutch national team after Euro 2012, in which the Netherlands were eliminated in the first round. During the season, it was decided that Cocu would succeed Advocaat in case he would announce his departure. When Advocaat quit post-season, Cocu signed a four-year contract as manager of PSV. Joined by Faber and Chris van der Weerden as his assistants, Cocu stressed his emphasis on developing players from the PSV youth ranks. On 18 April 2015, Cocu won the Eredivisie title after a 4–1 win over Heerenveen. This was PSV's first league title since 2008, also ending a four-year domination of the league by Ajax. Cocu's team defended the league title one season later.

=== Fenerbahçe ===
On 22 June 2018, Cocu was appointed on a three-year deal at Turkey's Fenerbahçe, who had just elected a new president and board. He was dismissed on 28 October with the club just one point and one place above the relegation zone, following a 3–1 home loss to MKE Ankaragücü.

=== Derby County ===
On 5 July 2019, Cocu was announced as the new manager of Championship club Derby County. He guided Derby to a tenth-place finish, whilst installing a sense of total football locally known as Cocuball. On 14 November 2020, Cocu and Derby parted company with the club at the bottom of the league table.

=== Vitesse ===
Cocu returned to work after almost two years on 26 September 2022, being appointed at 14th-placed Vitesse, where he had left as a player in 1995. He replaced Thomas Letsch, who had left for VfL Bochum. He resigned on 11 November 2023 after a 1–3 home loss to Heerenveen, which saw the team at the bottom of the league with eight points after twelve matches.

== Career statistics ==
=== Club ===
Appearances and goals by club, season and competition
Club	Season	League			National cup (Note: Includes KNVB Cup, Copa del Rey)		Continental		Other (Note: Includes Johan Cruijff Shield, Supercopa de España)		Total	
Club	Season	Division	Apps	Goals	Apps	Goals	Apps	Goals	Apps	Goals	Apps	Goals
AZ	1988–89	Eerste Divisie	15	4	2	1	–		–		17	5
AZ	1989–90	Eerste Divisie	35	4	1	0	–		–		36	4
AZ	Total		50	8	3	1	–		–		53	9
Vitesse	1990–91	Eredivisie	8	0	0	0	–		–		8	0
Vitesse	1991–92	Eredivisie	33	3	2	0	–		–		35	3
Vitesse	1992–93	Eredivisie	34	6	2	1	6 (Note: Appearances in UEFA Cup)	1	–		42	8
Vitesse	1993–94	Eredivisie	33	11	1	0	2	0	–		36	11
Vitesse	1994–95	Eredivisie	29	5	1	1	2	0	–		32	6
Vitesse	Total		137	25	6	2	10	1	–		153	28
PSV	1995–96	Eredivisie	29	12	4	2	8	2	–		41	16
PSV	1996–97	Eredivisie	34	8	2	0	4 (Note: Appearances in UEFA Cup Winners' Cup)	1	1 (Note: Appearance in Johan Cruyff Shield)	0	41	9
PSV	1997–98	Eredivisie	32	11	5	3	6 (Note: Appearances in UEFA Champions League)	1	1	2	44	17
PSV	Total		95	31	11	5	18	4	2	2	126	42
Barcelona	1998–99	La Liga	36	12	4	0	5	0	2 (Note: Appearances in Supercopa de España)	0	47	12
Barcelona	1999–2000	La Liga	35	6	2	0	14	2	2	0	53	8
Barcelona	2000–01	La Liga	35	3	7	0	13 (Note: Five appearances and one goal in UEFA Champions League, eight appearances in UEFA Cup)	1	–		55	4
Barcelona	2001–02	La Liga	34	2	0	0	16	0	–		50	2
Barcelona	2002–03	La Liga	29	3	0	0	10	2	–		39	5
Barcelona	2003–04	La Liga	36	5	5	0	7	1	–		48	6
Barcelona	Total		205	31	18	0	65	6	4	0	292	37
PSV	2004–05	Eredivisie	29	6	3	1	13	3	–		45	10
PSV	2005–06	Eredivisie	33	10	4	2	8	1	1	0	46	13
PSV	2006–07	Eredivisie	32	7	2	0	7	0	1	1	42	8
PSV	Total		94	23	9	3	28	4	2	1	133	31
Al Jazira	2007–08	UAE Football League	17	4			–				17	4
Career total			598	122	47	11	121	15	8	3	774	151

=== International ===
Appearances and goals by national team and year
National team	Year	Apps	Goals
Netherlands	1996	9	2
Netherlands	1997	6	0
Netherlands	1998	15	2
Netherlands	1999	7	0
Netherlands	2000	13	0
Netherlands	2001	8	1
Netherlands	2002	7	1
Netherlands	2003	9	1
Netherlands	2004	13	1
Netherlands	2005	7	2
Netherlands	2006	7	0
Total		101	10

Scores and results list the Netherlands goal tally first, score column indicates score after each Cocu goal.

List of international goals scored by Phillip Cocu
No.	Date	Venue	Opponent	Score	Result	Competition
1	4 June 1996	De Kuip, Rotterdam	Republic of Ireland	3–1	3–1	Friendly
2	9 October 1996	Philips Stadion, Eindhoven, Netherlands	Wales	5–1	7–1	1998 FIFA World Cup qualification
3	20 June 1998	Stade Vélodrome, Marseille, France	South Korea	1–0	5–0	1998 FIFA World Cup
4	25 June 1998	Stade Geoffroy-Guichard, Saint-Étienne, France	Mexico	1–0	2–2	1998 FIFA World Cup
5	5 September 2001	Philips Stadion, Eindhoven, Netherlands	Estonia	3–0	5–0	2002 FIFA World Cup qualification
6	16 October 2002	Ernst-Happel-Stadion, Vienna, Austria	Austria	2–0	3–0	UEFA Euro 2004 qualification
7	6 September 2003	De Kuip, Rotterdam	Austria	3–1	3–1	UEFA Euro 2004 qualification
8	17 November 2004	Mini Estadi, Barcelona, Spain	Andorra	1–0	3–0	2006 FIFA World Cup qualification
9	26 March 2005	Stadionul Giulești, Bucharest, Romania	Romania	1–0	2–0	2006 FIFA World Cup qualification
10	8 June 2005	Helsinki Olympic Stadium, Helsinki, Finland	Finland	3–0	4–0	2006 FIFA World Cup qualification

== Managerial statistics ==
As of match played 11 November 2023

Managerial record by team and tenure
Team	Nat	From	To	Record								Ref
Team	Nat	From	To	G	W	D	L	GF	GA	GD	Win %	Ref
PSV (caretaker)	(Netherlands)	12 March 2012	2 July 2012	12	9	1	2	31	12	+19	75.00	
PSV	(Netherlands)	1 July 2013	22 June 2018	225	146	36	43	478	234	+244	64.89	
Fenerbahçe	(Turkey)	22 June 2018	28 October 2018	15	3	5	7	13	21	−8	20.00	
Derby County	(England)	5 July 2019	14 November 2020	65	21	18	26	74	90	−16	32.31	
Vitesse	(Netherlands)	27 September 2022	11 November 2023	41	12	11	18	50	60	−10	29.27	
Total				358	191	71	96	646	417	+229	53.35	—

== Honours ==
=== Player ===
PSV

- Eredivisie: 1996–97, 2004–05, 2005–06, 2006–07
- KNVB Cup: 1995–96, 2004–05
- Johan Cruyff Shield: 1996, 1997

Barcelona

- La Liga: 1998–99

Al Jazira

- Gulf Club Champions Cup: 2007

=== Manager ===
PSV

- Eredivisie: 2014–15, 2015–16, 2017–18
- KNVB Cup: 2011–12
- Johan Cruyff Shield: 2015, 2016

Individual

- Rinus Michels Award: 2015, 2018

== See also ==
- List of footballers with 100 or more caps
