= Netherlands national football team results (2000–2009) =

- Win Draw Loss

This is a list of football games played by the Netherlands national football team between 2000 and 2009.

== 2000 ==
23 February Friendly	Netherlands	2–1	Germany	Amsterdam, Netherlands
20:30 UTC+1	Kluivert 15'; Zenden 28'	Report	Ziege 22'	Stadium: Amsterdam Arena; Attendance: 48,778; Referee: Domenico Messina (Italy)

29 March Friendly	Belgium	2–2	Netherlands	Brussels, Belgium
20:00 UTC+1	Verheyen 14'; É. Mpenza 26'	Report	Kluivert 33', 84'	Stadium: King Baudouin Stadium; Attendance: 46,400; Referee: Stefano Braschi (Italy)

26 April Friendly	Netherlands	0–0	Scotland	Arnhem, Netherlands
20:30 UTC+2		Report		Stadium: Gelredome; Attendance: 28,000; Referee: Harmut Strampe (Germany)

27 May Friendly	Netherlands	2–1	Romania	Amsterdam, Netherlands
20:30 UTC+2	Overmars 43'; Kluivert 68'	Report	Moldovan 70'	Stadium: Amsterdam Arena; Attendance: 43,500; Referee: Terje Hauge (Norway)

4 June Friendly	Netherlands	3–1	Poland	Lausanne, Switzerland
18:00 UTC+2	F. de Boer 29' (pen.); Kluivert 56', 60'	Report	Kryszałowicz 38'	Stadium: Stade Olympique; Attendance: 7,000; Referee: Dominique Tavel (Switzerland)

11 June UEFA Euro 2000 Group D	Netherlands	1–0	Czech Republic	Amsterdam, Netherlands
20:45 UTC+2	F. de Boer 89' (pen.)	Report		Stadium: Amsterdam ArenA; Attendance: 50,000; Referee: Pierluigi Collina (Italy)

16 June UEFA Euro 2000 Group D	Denmark	0–3	Netherlands	Rotterdam, Netherlands
20:45 UTC+2		Report	Kluivert 57'; R. de Boer 66'; Zenden 77'	Stadium: De Kuip; Attendance: 50,000; Referee: Urs Meier (Switzerland)

21 June UEFA Euro 2000 Group D	France	2–3	Netherlands	Amsterdam, Netherlands
20:45 UTC+2	Dugarry 8'; Trezeguet 31'	Report	Kluivert 14'; F. de Boer 51'; Zenden 59'	Stadium: Amsterdam ArenA; Attendance: 50,000; Referee: Anders Frisk (Sweden)

25 June UEFA Euro 2000 Quarter-final	Netherlands	6–1	FR Yugoslavia	Rotterdam, Netherlands
18:00 UTC+2	Kluivert 24', 38', 54'; Govedarica 51' (o.g.); Overmars 78', 90'	Report	Milošević 90'	Stadium: De Kuip; Attendance: 50,000; Referee: José Garcia Aranda (Spain)

29 June UEFA Euro 2000 Semi-final	Italy	0–0 (a.e.t.) (3–1 p)	Netherlands	Amsterdam, Netherlands
18:00 UTC+2		Report		Stadium: Amsterdam Arena; Attendance: 50,000; Referee: Markus Merk (Germany)
	Penalties
	Di Biagio (penalty scored); Pessotto (penalty scored); Totti (penalty scored); Maldini (penalty missed)		(penalty missed) F. de Boer; (penalty missed) Stam; (penalty scored) Kluivert; (penalty missed) Bosvelt

2 September 2002 FIFA World Cup qualification	Netherlands	2–2	Republic of Ireland	Amsterdam, Netherlands
20:30 UTC+2	Talan 71'; Van Bronckhorst 84'	Report	Robbie Keane 21'; McAteer 65'	Stadium: Amsterdam Arena; Attendance: 50,000; Referee: Ľuboš Micheľ (Slovakia)

7 October 2002 FIFA World Cup qualification	Cyprus	0–4	Netherlands	Nicosia, Cyprus
20:30 UTC+3		Report	Seedorf 69', 78'; Overmars 82'; Kluivert 90'	Stadium: GSP Stadium; Attendance: 10,250; Referee: Graziano Cesari (Italy)

11 October 2002 FIFA World Cup qualification	Netherlands	0–2	Portugal	Rotterdam, Netherlands
20:30 UTC+2		Report	Conceição 11'; Pauleta 44'	Stadium: De Kuip; Attendance: 44,620; Referee: Graham Poll (England)

15 November Friendly	Spain	1–2	Netherlands	Sevilla, Spain
21:30 UTC+1	Hierro 67'	Report	Hasselbaink 74'; F. de Boer 80'	Stadium: Estadio La Cartuja; Attendance: 50,000; Referee: Domenico Messina (Italy)

== 2001 ==
28 February Friendly	Netherlands	0–0	Turkey	Amsterdam, Netherlands
20:30 UTC+1		Report		Stadium: Amsterdam Arena; Attendance: 48,500; Referee: Mikko Vuorela (Finland)

24 March 2002 FIFA World Cup qualification	Andorra	0–5	Netherlands	Barcelona, Spain
20:30 UTC+2		Report	Kluivert 9'; Hasselbaink 36'; Van Hooijdonk 61', 70'; Van Bommel 84'	Stadium: Mini Estadi; Attendance: 3,823; Referee: Edo Trivković (Croatia)

28 March 2002 FIFA World Cup qualification	Portugal	2–2	Netherlands	Porto, Portugal
21:00 UTC+2	Pauleta 83'; Figo 90+3' (pen.)	Report	Hasselbaink 18' (pen.); Kluivert 48'	Stadium: Estádio das Antas; Attendance: 42,164; Referee: Urs Meier (Switzerland)

25 April 2002 FIFA World Cup qualification	Netherlands	4–0	Cyprus	Eindhoven, Netherlands
20:30 UTC+2	Hasselbaink 29'; Overmars 35'; Kluivert 44'; Van Nistelrooy 81'	Report		Stadium: Philips Stadion; Attendance: 31,000; Referee: Yuri Baskakov (Russia)

2 June 2002 FIFA World Cup qualification	Estonia	2–4	Netherlands	Tallinn, Estonia
15:00 UTC+3	Oper 65'; Zelinski 78'	Report	Piiroja 78' (o.g.); Van Nistelrooy 86', 90'; Kluivert 89'	Stadium: Lilleküla Stadium; Attendance: 9,323; Referee: Ceri Richards (Wales)

15 August Friendly	England	0–2	Netherlands	London, England
20:30 UTC+1		Report	Van Bommel 38'; Van Nistelrooy 39'	Stadium: White Hart Lane; Attendance: 35,238; Referee: Anders Frisk (Sweden)

1 September 2002 FIFA World Cup qualification	Republic of Ireland	1–0	Netherlands	Dublin, Ireland
15:00 UTC+1	McAteer 68'	Report		Stadium: Lansdowne Road; Attendance: 35,400; Referee: Hellmut Krug (Germany)

5 September 2002 FIFA World Cup qualification	Netherlands	5–0	Estonia	Eindhoven, Netherlands
20:30 UTC+2	Zenden 16'; Van Bommel 26', 39'; Cocu 32'; Van Nistelrooy 43'	Report		Stadium: Philips Stadion; Attendance: 28,500; Referee: Kyros Vassaras (Greece)

6 October 2002 FIFA World Cup qualification	Netherlands	4–0	Andorra	Arnhem, Netherlands
20:30 UTC+2	Van Hooijdonk 3'; Seedorf 45'; Van Nistelrooy 53', 89'	Report		Stadium: Gelredome; Attendance: 18,500; Referee: Orhan Erdemir (Turkey)

10 November Friendly	Denmark	1–1	Netherlands	Copenhagen, Denmark
19:15 UTC+1	Jørgensen 84' (pen.)	Report	Hasselbaink 45' (pen.)	Stadium: Parken; Attendance: 20,354; Referee: Stuart Dougal (Scotland)

== 2002 ==
13 February Friendly	Netherlands	1–1	England	Amsterdam, Netherlands
20:30 UTC+1	Kluivert 26'	Report	Vassell 61'	Stadium: Amsterdam ArenA; Attendance: 41,069; Referee: Laurent Duhamel (France)

27 March Friendly	Netherlands	1–0	Spain	Rotterdam, Netherlands
20:30 UTC+1	F. de Boer 31'	Report		Stadium: De Kuip; Attendance: 25,500; Referee: Karl-Erik Nilsson (Sweden)

19 May Friendly	United States	0–2	Netherlands	Foxborough, United States
14:00 UTC-4		Report	Makaay 45' van der Meyde 76'	Stadium: CMGI Field; Attendance: 36,778; Referee: Benito Archundia (Mexico)

21 August Friendly	Norway	0–1	Netherlands	Oslo, Norway
20:30 UTC+2		Report	Davids 71'	Stadium: Ullevaal Stadion; Attendance: 15,356; Referee: Fritz Stuchlik (Austria)

7 September UEFA Euro 2004 qualifying	Netherlands	3–0	Belarus	Eindhoven, Netherlands
20:30 UTC+2	Davids 35'; Kluivert 37'; Hasselbaink 73'	Report		Stadium: Philips Stadion; Attendance: 34,000; Referee: Graham Barber (England)

16 October UEFA Euro 2004 qualifying	Austria	0–3	Netherlands	Vienna, Austria
20:30 UTC+2		Report	Seedorf 15'; Cocu 20'; Makaay 30'	Stadium: Ernst Happel Stadium; Attendance: 46,100; Referee: Pierluigi Collina (Italy)

20 November Friendly	Germany	1–3	Netherlands	Gelsenkirchen, Germany
20:00 UTC+1	Bobic 34'	Report	Kluivert 22'; Hasselbaink 69'; Van Nistelrooy 79'	Stadium: Arena AufSchalke; Attendance: 60,601; Referee: Hugh Dallas (Scotland)

== 2003 ==
12 February Friendly	Netherlands	1–0	Argentina	Amsterdam, Netherlands
20:30 UTC+1	Van Bronckhorst 87'	Report		Stadium: Amsterdam ArenA; Attendance: 40,090; Referee: Kim Milton Nielsen (Denmark)

29 March UEFA Euro 2004 qualifying	Netherlands	1–1	Czech Republic	Rotterdam, Netherlands
20:30 UTC+1	Van Nistelrooy 45'	Report	Koller 68'	Stadium: De Kuip; Attendance: 48,378; Referee: Kim Milton Nielsen (Denmark)

2 April UEFA Euro 2004 qualifying	Moldova	1–2	Netherlands	Tiraspol, Moldova
21:00 UTC+3	Boret 16'	Report	Van Nistelrooy 37'; Van Bommel 85'	Stadium: Sheriff Stadium; Attendance: 9,500; Referee: Alain Sars (France)

30 April Friendly	Netherlands	1–1	Portugal	Eindhoven, Netherlands
20:45 UTC+2	Kluivert 27'	Report	Simão 78'	Stadium: Philips Stadion; Attendance: 27,200; Referee: Urs Meier (Switzerland)

7 June UEFA Euro 2004 qualifying	Belarus	0–2	Netherlands	Minsk, Belarus
21:00 UTC+3		Report	Overmars 61'; Kluivert 68'	Stadium: Dinamo Stadium; Attendance: 19,309; Referee: Tom Henning Øvrebø (Norway)

20 August Friendly	Belgium	1–1	Netherlands	Brussels, Belgium
20:15 UTC+2	Sonck 39'	Report	Makaay 55'	Stadium: King Baudouin Stadium; Attendance: 32,000; Referee: Herbert Fandel (Germany)

6 September UEFA Euro 2004 qualifying	Netherlands	3–1	Austria	Rotterdam, Netherlands
20:30 UTC+2	Van der Vaart 29'; Kluivert 60'; Cocu 62'	Report	Pogatetz 32'	Stadium: De Kuip; Attendance: 45,000; Referee: Eric Poulat (France)

10 September UEFA Euro 2004 qualifying	Czech Republic	3–1	Netherlands	Prague, Czech Republic
20:15 UTC+2	Koller 14' (pen.); Poborsky 37'; Baroš 90'	Report	Van der Vaart 60'	Stadium: Toyota Arena; Attendance: 18,356; Referee: Lucílio Batista (Portugal)

11 October UEFA Euro 2004 qualifying	Netherlands	5–0	Moldova	Eindhoven, Netherlands
20:30 UTC+2	Kluivert 43'; Sneijder 50'; Van Hooijdonk 73' (pen.); Van der Vaart 79'; Robben 88'	Report		Stadium: Philips Stadion; Attendance: 30,995; Referee: Željko Širić (Croatia)

15 November UEFA Euro 2004 qualifying play-offs	Scotland	1–0	Netherlands	Glasgow, Scotland
15:00 UTC±0	McFadden 22'	Report		Stadium: Hampden Park; Attendance: 50,603; Referee: Terje Hauge (Norway)

19 November UEFA Euro 2004 qualifying play-offs	Netherlands	6–0 (6–1 agg.)	Scotland	Amsterdam, Netherlands
20:30 UTC+1	Sneijder 13'; Ooijer 32'; Van Nistelrooy 37', 51', 67'; F. de Boer 65'	Report		Stadium: Amsterdam ArenA; Attendance: 49,656; Referee: Ľuboš Micheľ (Slovakia)

== 2004 ==
18 February Friendly	Netherlands	1–0	United States	Amsterdam, Netherlands
20:30 UTC+1	Robben 57'	Report		Stadium: Amsterdam ArenA; Attendance: 29,700; Referee: Tom Henning Øvrebø (Norway)

31 March Friendly	Netherlands	0–0	France	Rotterdam, Netherlands
20:45 UTC+2		Report		Stadium: De Kuip; Attendance: 49,000; Referee: Wolfgang Stark (Germany)

28 April Friendly	Netherlands	4–0	Greece	Eindhoven, Netherlands
20:30 UTC+2	Makaay 50'; Zenden 58'; Heitinga 61'; Van Hooijdonk 89'	Report		Stadium: Philips Stadion; Attendance: 27,000; Referee: Cosimo Bolognino (Italy)

29 May Friendly	Netherlands	0–1	Belgium	Eindhoven, Netherlands
20:30 UTC+2		Report	Goor 78' (pen.)	Stadium: Philips Stadion; Attendance: 34,000; Referee: Claude Colombo (France)

1 June Friendly	Netherlands	3–0	Faroe Islands	Lausanne, Switzerland
20:15 UTC+2	Van der Vaart 30'; Makaay 51'; Overmars 59'	Report		Stadium: Stade Olympique de la Pontaise; Attendance: 3,200; Referee: Philippe Leuba (Switzerland)

5 June Friendly	Netherlands	0–1	Republic of Ireland	Amsterdam, Netherlands
20:00 UTC+2		Report	Rob. Keane 45'	Stadium: Amsterdam ArenA; Attendance: 42,000; Referee: Mike Dean (England)

15 June UEFA Euro 2004 Group D	Germany	1–1	Netherlands	Porto, Portugal
19:45 UTC+1	Frings 30'	Report	Van Nistelrooy 81'	Stadium: Estádio do Dragão; Attendance: 48,197; Referee: Anders Frisk (Sweden)

19 June UEFA Euro 2004 Group D	Netherlands	2–3	Czech Republic	Aveiro, Portugal
19:45 UTC+1	Bouma 4'; Van Nistelrooy 19'	Report	Koller 23'; Baroš 71'; Šmicer 88'	Stadium: Estádio Municipal; Attendance: 29,935; Referee: Manuel Mejuto González (Spain)

23 June UEFA Euro 2004 Group D	Netherlands	3–0	Latvia	Braga, Portugal
19:45 UTC+1	Van Nistelrooy 27' (pen.), 35'; Makaay 84'	Report		Stadium: Estádio Municipal; Attendance: 27,904; Referee: Kim Milton Nielsen (Denmark)

26 June UEFA Euro 2004 Quarter-final	Netherlands	0–0 (a.e.t.) (5–4 p)	Sweden	Faro, Portugal
19:45 UTC+1		Report		Stadium: Estádio do Algarve; Attendance: 27,762; Referee: Ľuboš Micheľ (Slovakia)
	Penalties
	Van Nistelrooy (penalty scored); Heitinga (penalty scored); Reiziger (penalty scored); Cocu (penalty missed); Makaay (penalty scored); Robben (penalty scored)		(penalty scored) Källström; (penalty scored) Larsson; (penalty missed) Ibrahimović; (penalty scored) Ljungberg; (penalty scored) Wilhelmsson; (penalty missed) Mellberg

30 June UEFA Euro 2004 Semi-final	Portugal	2–1	Netherlands	Lisbon, Portugal
19:45 UTC+1	Ronaldo 26'; Maniche 58'	Report	Andrade 63' (o.g.)	Stadium: Estádio José Alvalade; Attendance: 46,679; Referee: Anders Frisk (Sweden)

18 August Friendly	Sweden	2–2	Netherlands	Solna, Sweden
20:15 UTC+2	M. Jonson 4'; Ibrahimović 69'	Report	Sneijder 17'; Van Bommel 43'	Stadium: Råsunda Stadium; Attendance: 20,377; Referee: Rob Styles (England)

3 September Friendly	Netherlands	3–0	Liechtenstein	Utrecht, Netherlands
20:30 UTC+2	Van Bommel 23'; Ooijer 56'; Landzaat 78'	Report		Stadium: Stadion Galgenwaard; Attendance: 15,000; Referee: Iain Brines (Scotland)

8 September 2006 FIFA World Cup qualification	Netherlands	2–0	Czech Republic	Amsterdam, Netherlands
20:30 UTC+2	Van Hooijdonk 33', 84'	Report		Stadium: Amsterdam ArenA; Attendance: 48,488; Referee: Markus Merk (Germany)

9 October 2006 FIFA World Cup qualification	Macedonia	2–2	Netherlands	Skopje, Macedonia
20:30 UTC+2	Pandev 45'; Stojkov 71'	Report	Bouma 42'; Kuyt 65'	Stadium: Skopje City Stadium; Attendance: 15,000; Referee: Peter Frojdfeldt (Sweden)

13 October 2006 FIFA World Cup qualification	Netherlands	3–1	Finland	Amsterdam, Netherlands
20:30 UTC+2	Sneijder 39'; Van Nistelrooy 41', 63'	Report	Tainio 13'	Stadium: Amsterdam ArenA; Attendance: 50,000; Referee: Stephen Bennett (England)

17 November 2006 FIFA World Cup qualification	Andorra	0–3	Netherlands	Barcelona, Spain
20:30 UTC+1		Report	Cocu 21'; Robben 31'; Sneijder 78'	Stadium: Mini Estadi; Attendance: 2,000; Referee: Alon Yefet (Israel)

== 2005 ==
9 February Friendly	England	0–0	Netherlands	Birmingham, England
19:45 UTC+0		Report		Stadium: Villa Park; Attendance: 40,705; Referee: Peter Frøjdfeldt (Sweden)

26 March 2006 FIFA World Cup qualification	Romania	0–2	Netherlands	Bucharest, Romania
20:00 UTC+2		Report	Cocu 1'; Babel 84'	Stadium: Stadionul Giuleşti; Attendance: 16,100; Referee: Luis Medina Cantalejo (Spain)

30 March 2006 FIFA World Cup qualification	Netherlands	2–0	Armenia	Eindhoven, Netherlands
20:30 UTC+2	Castelen 3' van Nistelrooy 33'	Report		Stadium: Philips Stadion; Attendance: 35,000; Referee: Matteo Trefoloni (Italy)

4 June 2006 FIFA World Cup qualification	Netherlands	2–0	Romania	Rotterdam, Netherlands
20:30 UTC+2	Robben 26'; Kuyt 47'	Report		Stadium: De Kuip; Attendance: 47,000; Referee: Massimo De Santis (Italy)

8 June 2006 FIFA World Cup qualification	Finland	0–4	Netherlands	Helsinki, Finland
21:00 UTC+3		Report	Van Nistelrooy 36'; Kuyt 76'; Cocu 85'; Van Persie 87'	Stadium: Olympic Stadium; Attendance: 37,786; Referee: Alain Hamer (Luxembourg)

17 August Friendly	Netherlands	2–2	Germany	Rotterdam, Netherlands
20:30 UTC+2	Robben 3', 46'	Report	Ballack 49'; Asamoah 81'	Stadium: De Kuip; Attendance: 45,500; Referee: Terje Hauge (Norway)

3 September 2006 FIFA World Cup qualification	Armenia	0–1	Netherlands	Yerevan, Armenia
22:00 UTC+5		Report	van Nistelrooy 64'	Stadium: Hanrapetakan Stadium; Attendance: 1,747; Referee: Stuart Dougal (Scotland)

7 September 2006 FIFA World Cup qualification	Netherlands	4–0	Andorra	Eindhoven, Netherlands
20:30 UTC+2	van der Vaart 23'; Lima 27' (o.g.) van Nistelrooy 43', 89'	Report		Stadium: Philips Stadion; Attendance: 34,000; Referee: Attila Hanacsek (Hungary)

8 October 2006 FIFA World Cup qualification	Czech Republic	0–2	Netherlands	Prague, Czech Republic
20:30 UTC+2		Report	van der Vaart 31'; Opdam 38'	Stadium: Toyota Arena; Attendance: 17,478; Referee: Alain Sars (France)

12 October 2006 FIFA World Cup qualification	Netherlands	0–0	Macedonia	Amsterdam, Netherlands
19:30 UTC+2		Report		Stadium: Amsterdam ArenA; Attendance: 50,000; Referee: Stefano Farina (Italy)

12 November Friendly	Netherlands	1–3	Italy	Amsterdam, Netherlands
20:45 UTC+1	Babel 38'	Report	Gilardino 41'; Vlaar 45+1' (o.g.); Toni 50'	Stadium: Amsterdam ArenA; Attendance: 50,000; Referee: Valentin Valentinovich Ivanov (Russia)

== 2006 ==
1 March Friendly	Netherlands	1–0	Ecuador	Amsterdam, Netherlands
20:30 UTC+1	Kuyt 48'	Report		Stadium: Amsterdam ArenA; Attendance: 30,000; Referee: Olegário Benquerença (Portugal)

27 May Friendly	Netherlands	1–0	Cameroon	Rotterdam, Netherlands
20:30 UTC+2	Nistelrooy 23'	Report		Stadium: De Kuip; Attendance: 48,000; Referee: Konrad Plautz (Austria)

1 June Friendly	Netherlands	2–1	Mexico	Eindhoven, Netherlands
20:00 UTC+2	Heitinga 53'; Babel 57'	Report	Borgetti 19'	Stadium: Philips Stadion; Attendance: 35,000; Referee: Peter Fröjdfeldt (Sweden)

4 June Friendly	Netherlands	1–1	Australia	Rotterdam, Netherlands
15:00 UTC+2	Nistelrooy 10'	Report	Cahill 54'	Stadium: De Kuip; Attendance: 49,000; Referee: Mike Dean (England)

11 June 2006 FIFA World Cup Group C	Serbia and Montenegro	0–1	Netherlands	Leipzig, Germany
15:00 UTC+2		Report	Robben 18'	Stadium: Zentralstadion; Attendance: 43,000; Referee: Markus Merk (Germany)

16 June 2006 FIFA World Cup Group C	Netherlands	2–1	Ivory Coast	Stuttgart, Germany
18:00 UTC+2	Persie 23'; Nistelrooy 27'	Report	Koné 38'	Stadium: Gottlieb-Daimler-Stadion; Attendance: 52,000; Referee: Óscar Ruiz (Colombia)

21 June 2006 FIFA World Cup Group C	Netherlands	0–0	Argentina	Frankfurt, Germany
21:00 UTC+2		Report		Stadium: Gottlieb-Daimler-Stadion; Attendance: 48,000; Referee: Luis Medina Cantalejo (Spain)

25 June 2006 FIFA World Cup Round of 16	Portugal	1–0	Netherlands	Nurnberg, Germany
21:00 UTC+2	Maniche 23'	Report		Stadium: Frankenstadion; Attendance: 41,000; Referee: Valentin Ivanov (Russia)

16 August Friendly	Republic of Ireland	0–4	Netherlands	Dublin, Ireland
20:30 UTC+1		Report	Huntelaar 25', 53'; Robben 41'; Persie 70'	Stadium: Lansdowne Road; Attendance: 42,400; Referee: Tom Henning Øvrebø (Norway)

2 September UEFA Euro 2008 qualifying	Luxembourg	0–1	Netherlands	Luxembourg City, Luxembourg
20:30 UTC+2		Report	Mathijsen 26'	Stadium: Stade Josy Barthel; Attendance: 8,055; Referee: João Ferreira (Portugal)

6 September UEFA Euro 2008 qualifying	Netherlands	3–0	Belarus	Eindhoven, Netherlands
	Van Persie 33', 78'; Kuyt 90+2'	Report		Stadium: Philips Stadion; Attendance: 30,089; Referee: Howard Webb (England)

7 October UEFA Euro 2008 qualifying	Bulgaria	1–1	Netherlands	Sofia, Bulgaria
21:00 UTC+3	Petrov 12'	Report	Persie 62'	Stadium: Gerena; Attendance: 30,547; Referee: Tom Henning Øvrebø (Norway)

11 October UEFA Euro 2008 qualifying	Netherlands	2–1	Albania	Amsterdam, Netherlands
20:30 UTC+2	Persie 15'; Beqaj 42' (o.g.)	Report	Curri 67'	Stadium: Amsterdam ArenA; Attendance: 40,085; Referee: Alon Yefet (Israel)

15 November Friendly	Netherlands	1–1	England	Amsterdam, Netherlands
20:00 UTC+1	van der Vaart 86'	Report	Rooney 37'	Stadium: Amsterdam ArenA; Attendance: 44,000; Referee: Ľuboš Micheľ (Slovakia)

== 2007 ==
7 February Friendly	Netherlands	4–1	Russia	Amsterdam, Netherlands
20:45 UTC+1	Babel 68'; Sneijder 71'; Mathijsen 79' van der Vaart 89' (pen.)	Report	Bystrov 76'	Stadium: Amsterdam ArenA; Attendance: 22,000; Referee: Mark Clattenburg (England)

24 March UEFA Euro 2008 qualifying	Netherlands	0–0	Romania	Rotterdam, Netherlands
20:30 UTC+1		Report		Stadium: De Kuip; Attendance: 48,000; Referee: Markus Merk (Germany)

28 March UEFA Euro 2008 qualifying	Slovenia	0–1	Netherlands	Celje, Slovenia
20:45 UTC+2		Report	Bronckhorst 86'	Stadium: Arena Petrol; Attendance: 9,520; Referee: Manuel Mejuto González (Spain)

2 June Friendly	South Korea	0–2	Netherlands	Seoul, South Korea
13:00 UTC+9		Report	van der Vaart 32' (pen.), 72'	Stadium: Sangam Stadium; Attendance: 64,000; Referee: Krishnan Ramachandran (Malaysia)

6 June Friendly	Thailand	1–3	Netherlands	Bangkok, Thailand
14:00 UTC+7	Sripan 65'	Report	van der Vaart 3'; Heitinga 42'; Vennegoor of Hesselink 55'	Stadium: Rajamangala Stadium; Attendance: 20,000; Referee: Miniam Ganesan (Singapore)

22 August Friendly	Switzerland	2–1	Netherlands	Geneva, Switzerland
20:30 UTC+2	Barnetta 9' (pen.), 51'	Report	Kuyt 52'	Stadium: Stade de Genève; Attendance: 24,000; Referee: Laurent Duhamel (France)

8 September UEFA Euro 2008 qualifying	Netherlands	2–0	Bulgaria	Amsterdam, Netherlands
20:30 UTC+2	Sneijder 23'; Nistelrooy 58'	Report		Stadium: Amsterdam ArenA; Attendance: 49,500; Referee: Luis Medina Cantalejo (Spain)

12 September UEFA Euro 2008 qualifying	Albania	0–1	Netherlands	Tirana, Albania
20:45 UTC+2		Report	Nistelrooy 90+1'	Stadium: Qemal Stafa Stadium; Attendance: 15,000; Referee: Mike Riley (England)

13 October UEFA Euro 2008 qualifying	Romania	1–0	Netherlands	Constanța, Romania
20:15 UTC+3	Goian 71'	Report		Stadium: Stadionul Farul; Attendance: 12,595; Referee: Kyros Vassaras (Greece)

17 October UEFA Euro 2008 qualifying	Netherlands	2–0	Slovenia	Eindhoven, Netherlands
20:30 UTC+2	Sneijder 14'; Huntelaar 88'	Report		Stadium: Philips Stadion; Attendance: 32,500; Referee: Nicola Rizzoli (Italy)

17 November UEFA Euro 2008 qualifying	Netherlands	1–0	Luxembourg	Rotterdam, Netherlands
20:30 UTC+1	Koevermans 43'	Report		Stadium: De Kuip; Attendance: 45,000; Referee: Martin Hansson (Sweden)

21 November UEFA Euro 2008 qualifying	Belarus	2–1	Netherlands	Minsk, Belarus
19:00 UTC+2	Bulyga 49'; Karytska 65'	Report	van der Vaart 89'	Stadium: Dinamo Stadium; Attendance: 11,900; Referee: Bertrand Layec (France)

== 2008 ==
6 February Friendly	Croatia	0–3	Netherlands	Split, Croatia
20:30 UTC+1		Report	Heitinga 9'; Huntelaar 36'; Jan Vennegoor of Hesselink 89'	Stadium: Stadion Poljud; Attendance: 28,000; Referee: César Muñiz Fernández (Spain)

26 March Friendly	Austria	3–4	Netherlands	Vienna, Austria
20:30 UTC+1	Ivanschitz 7'; Prödl 18', 35'	Report	Huntelaar 37', 87'; Heitinga 67'; Jan Vennegoor of Hesselink 83'	Stadium: Ernst-Happel-Stadion; Attendance: 40,500; Referee: Martin Hansson (Sweden)

24 May Friendly	Netherlands	3–0	Ukraine	Rotterdam, Netherlands
20:30 UTC+2	Kuyt 24'; Huntelaar 38'; Babel 64'	Report		Stadium: De Kuip; Attendance: 34,000; Referee: Claudio Circhetta (Switzerland)

29 May Friendly	Netherlands	1–1	Denmark	Eindhoven, Netherlands
20:00 UTC+2	Nistelrooy 30'	Report	Poulsen 56'	Stadium: Philips Stadion; Attendance: 34,000; Referee: Tony Chapron (France)

1 June Friendly	Netherlands	2–0	Wales	Eindhoven, Netherlands
15:00 UTC+2	Robben 35'; Sneijder 54'	Report		Stadium: Philips Stadion; Attendance: 49,000; Referee: Felix Brych (Germany)

9 June UEFA Euro 2008 Group C	Netherlands	3–0	Italy	Bern, Switzerland
20:45 UTC+2	Nistelrooy 26'; Sneijder 31'; Bronckhorst 79'	Report		Stadium: Stade de Suisse; Attendance: 30,777; Referee: Peter Frojdfeldt (Sweden)

13 June UEFA Euro 2008 Group C	Netherlands	4–1	France	Bern, Switzerland
20:45 UTC+2	Kuyt 9' van Persie 59'; Robben 70'; Sneijder 90+2'	Report	Henry 71'	Stadium: Stade de Suisse; Attendance: 30,777; Referee: Herbert Fandel (Germany)

17 June UEFA Euro 2008 Group C	Netherlands	2–0	Romania	Bern, Switzerland
20:45 UTC+2	Huntelaar 54' van Persie 87'	Report		Stadium: Stade de Suisse; Attendance: 30,777; Referee: Massimo Busacca (Switzerland)

21 June UEFA Euro 2008 Quarter-final	Netherlands	1–3 (a.e.t.)	Russia	Basel, Switzerland
20:45 UTC+2	Nistelrooy 86'	Report	Pavlyuchenko 56'; Torbinski 112'; Arshavin 116'	Stadium: St. Jakob-Park; Attendance: 38,374; Referee: Ľuboš Micheľ (Slovakia)

20 August Friendly	Russia	1–1	Netherlands	Moscow, Russia
19:15 UTC+4	Zyryanov 78' (pen.)	Report	Persie 24'	Stadium: Lokomotiv Stadium; Attendance: 20,000; Referee: Peter Frojdfeldt (Sweden)

6 September Friendly	Netherlands	1–2	Australia	Eindhoven, Netherlands
20:45 UTC+2	Huntelaar 6'	Report	Kewell 45' (pen.); Kennedy 76'	Stadium: Philips Stadion; Attendance: 22,500; Referee: Martin Atkinson (England)

10 September 2010 FIFA World Cup qualification	Macedonia	1–2	Netherlands	Skopje, Macedonia
20:30 UTC+2	Pandev 77' (pen.)	Report	Heitinga 46' van der Vaart 59'	Stadium: Philip II Arena; Attendance: 11,000; Referee: Grzegorz Gilewski (Poland)

11 October 2010 FIFA World Cup qualification	Netherlands	2–0	Iceland	Rotterdam, Netherlands
20:45 UTC+2	Mathijsen 15'; Huntelaar 65'	Report		Stadium: De Kuip; Attendance: 37,500; Referee: Matteo Trefoloni (Italy)

15 October 2010 FIFA World Cup qualification	Norway	0–1	Netherlands	Oslo, Norway
19:00 UTC+2		Report	Van Bommel 62'	Stadium: Ullevaal Stadion; Attendance: 23,840; Referee: Konrad Plautz (Austria)

19 November Friendly	Netherlands	3–1	Sweden	Eindhoven, Netherlands
20:45 UTC+1	van Persie 32', 48'; Kuyt 90'	Report	Källström 50'	Stadium: Philips Stadion; Attendance: 26,750; Referee: Zsolt Szabó (Hungary)

== 2009 ==
11 February Friendly	Tunisia	1–1	Netherlands	Radès, Tunisia
20:30 UTC+1	Saihi 67'	Report	Huntelaar 61'	Stadium: Stade 7 Novembre; Attendance: 17,000; Referee: Essam Abdel-Fatah (Egypt)

28 March 2010 FIFA World Cup qualification	Netherlands	3–0	Scotland	Amsterdam, Netherlands
20:45 UTC+1	Huntelaar 30'; Persie 45+1'; Kuyt 77' (pen.)	Report		Stadium: Amsterdam ArenA; Attendance: 50,000; Referee: Laurent Duhamel (France)

1 April 2010 FIFA World Cup qualification	Netherlands	4–0	Macedonia	Amsterdam, Netherlands
20:45 UTC+2	Kuyt 16', 41'; Huntelaar 25' van der Vaart 88'	Report		Stadium: Amsterdam ArenA; Attendance: 47,750; Referee: Peter Rasmussen (Denmark)

6 June 2010 FIFA World Cup qualification	Iceland	1–2	Netherlands	Reykjavík, Iceland
18:45 UTC±0	K. Sigurðsson 87'	Report	De Jong 8'; Bommel 15'	Stadium: Laugardalsvöllur; Attendance: 9,635; Referee: Mike Dean (England)

10 June 2010 FIFA World Cup qualification	Netherlands	2–0	Norway	Rotterdam, Netherlands
20:45 UTC+2	Ooijer 32'; Robben 50'	Report		Stadium: De Kuip; Attendance: 45,600; Referee: Yuri Baskakov (Russia)

12 August Friendly	Netherlands	2–2	England	Amsterdam, Netherlands
20:45 UTC+2	Kuyt 10' van der Vaart 37'	Report	Defoe 49', 76'	Stadium: Amsterdam ArenA; Attendance: 48,000; Referee: Nicola Rizzoli (Italy)

5 September Friendly	Netherlands	3–0	Japan	Enschede, Netherlands
14:00 UTC+2	Persie 69'; Sneijder 73'; Huntelaar 87'	Report		Stadium: De Grolsch Veste; Attendance: 23,750; Referee: Damir Skomina (Slovenia)

9 September 2010 FIFA World Cup qualification	Scotland	0–1	Netherlands	Glasgow, Scotland
19:30 UTC+1		Report	Elia 82'	Stadium: Hampden Park; Attendance: 51,230; Referee: Claus Bo Larsen (Denmark)

10 October Friendly	Australia	0–0	Netherlands	Sydney, Australia
10:30 UTC+11		Report		Stadium: Sydney Football Stadium; Attendance: 40,537; Referee: Tojo Minoru (Japan)

14 November Friendly	Italy	0–0	Netherlands	Pescara, Italy
20:50 UTC+1		Report		Stadium: Stadio Adriatico; Attendance: 17,134; Referee: Claudio Circhetta (Switzerland)

18 November Friendly	Netherlands	0–0	Paraguay	Eindhoven, Netherlands
20:45 UTC+1		Report		Stadium: Philips Stadion; Attendance: 25,000; Referee: Vladimír Hriňák (Slovakia)

== See also ==
- Netherlands national football team results
