= Jimmy Floyd Hasselbaink =

Dutch association football player and manager (born 1972)

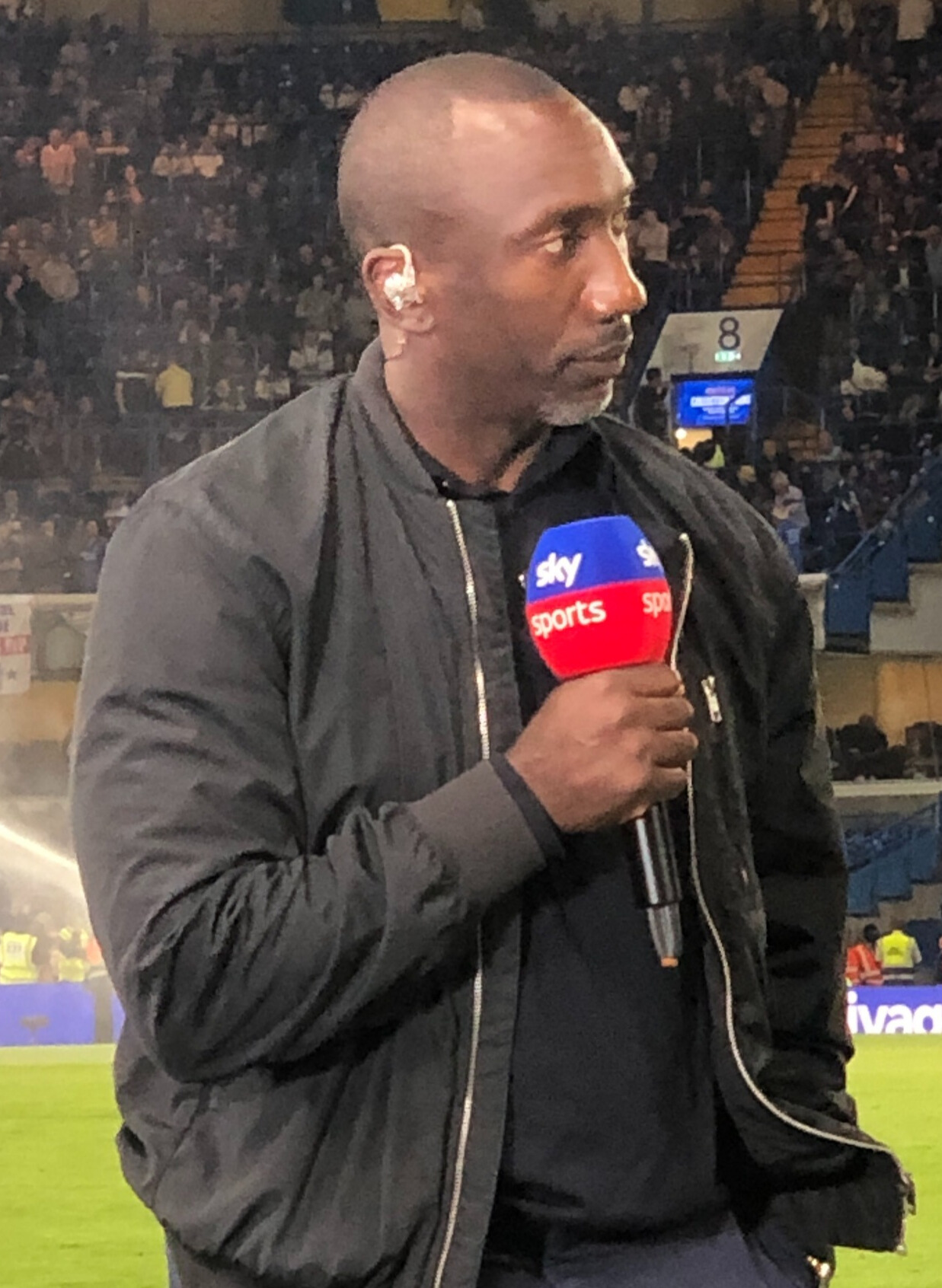
- Hasselbaink in 2023

Personal information
- Full name: Jerrel Floyd Hasselbaink
- Date of birth: 27 March 1972 (age 54)
- Place of birth: Paramaribo, Suriname
- Height: 1.78 m (5 ft 10 in)
- Position: Striker

Team information
- Current team: Chelsea (Club representative)

Youth career
- 1979–1986: GVO
- 1986–1987: ZFC
- 1987–1988: Zaanlandia
- 1988: DWS
- 1988–1990: Telstar

Senior career*
Years	Team	Apps	(Gls)
1990–1991	Telstar	4	(0)
1991–1994	AZ	35	(2)
1994–1995	Neerlandia		
1995–1996	Campomaiorense	31	(12)
1996–1997	Boavista	29	(20)
1997–1999	Leeds United	69	(34)
1999–2000	Atlético Madrid	34	(24)
2000–2004	Chelsea	136	(69)
2004–2006	Middlesbrough	58	(22)
2006–2007	Charlton Athletic	25	(2)
2007–2008	Cardiff City	36	(7)
Total		457	(192)

International career
1998–2002	Netherlands	27	(9)

Managerial career
- 2011–2013: Nottingham Forest (assistant coach)
- 2013–2014: FC Antwerp
- 2014–2015: Burton Albion
- 2015–2016: Queens Park Rangers
- 2017–2018: Northampton Town
- 2021–2022: Burton Albion
- 2023–2024: England (assistant coach)
- 2023–: Chelsea (club representative)
Medal record
Men's football
Representing England (as assistant coach)
UEFA European Championship
Runner-up	2024 Germany
- * Club domestic league appearances and goals

Jerrel "Jimmy" Floyd Hasselbaink (/ˈhæsəlˌbæŋk/ HASS-əl-bank; born 27 March 1972) is a professional football manager and former player who is currently a club representative for Premier League club Chelsea.

Born in Suriname, he and his family would later move to the Dutch city of Zaandam where he first played football, initially as a goalkeeper, later transitioning to the role of a right winger and finally a forward. He began his senior career with Telstar and AZ Alkmaar before leaving the Netherlands for Portuguese club Campomaiorense in August 1995. He joined Boavista the following year and won the Taça de Portugal with the club in 1997. He was signed by English side Leeds United for a £2 million fee before the 1997–98 season, where he established himself as a prolific goalscorer and went on to win the Premier League Golden Boot award in 1999. He was sold on to Spanish club Atlético Madrid for £10 million the same year, reaching the final of the Copa del Rey despite the club also suffering relegation from La Liga.

Hasselbaink returned to the Premier League with Chelsea for a club record £15 million fee in May 2000, where he once again led the league in scoring during his first season, earning him a second Premier League Golden Boot. He also played in the 2002 FA Cup Final and helped Chelsea to a career-high and then club-record second-place Premier League finish in 2003–04. He moved to Middlesbrough on a free transfer in July 2004 and played in the final of the UEFA Cup in 2006. After being released at the end of the season, he signed with Charlton Athletic in July 2006 before joining Cardiff City in August 2007. He played on the losing side in the 2008 FA Cup Final before retiring from play at the end of the season. He also scored nine goals in 23 matches during a four-year international career for the Netherlands national team, appearing at the 1998 FIFA World Cup.

In May 2013, he was appointed manager of Royal Antwerp in the Belgian Second Division, where he stayed for one season. In November 2014, he was hired by Burton Albion in England, and in his first season, he led them to their first-ever promotion to League One as champions of League Two. In December 2015, he was appointed manager of Queens Park Rangers in the Championship. He lasted 11 months in the job until he was dismissed in November 2016. From September 2017 to April 2018, he managed League One club Northampton Town. On New Year's Day 2021, he returned to Burton Albion as manager for a second spell, remaining until he resigned in September 2022.

== Early life ==
Hasselbaink was born on 27 March 1972 in Paramaribo, Suriname (then part of the Kingdom of the Netherlands), to Frank Ware and Cornelli Hasselbaink; he was the youngest of six children. At the age of five in 1977, Hasselbaink was run over by a moped, which broke his right leg. In October 1978, his mother took him and three siblings to live in Zaandam, Netherlands; his father remained in Suriname and rarely contacted the family. Hasselbaink grew up in a 14-storey apartment block mainly inhabited by immigrants, and witnessed several suicides by jumping.

In 1979, Hasselbaink began playing youth football for Gestaagt Volharding Overwint (GVO), initially as a goalkeeper. He later played for Zaansche Football club (ZFC) and Zaanlandia as a right winger. He joined a street gang at age 16 and began to carry a knife. He and his gang went to Amsterdam to steal tickets for a Public Enemy concert but were reported, and the police investigation found more stolen goods in Hasselbaink's bedroom, leading to him being sentenced to three months in a youth detention centre. He shared a cell with three other offenders, including a mentally disturbed man who could not speak Dutch, and reflected "Maybe it was the big shock I needed". After his release, he joined the youth team at DWS, but he was dismissed from the club for stealing the watch of a first-team player.

== Club career ==
=== Netherlands ===
Hasselbaink began his senior career with Telstar, while still a gang member, and had disciplinary issues at the club due to his persistent lateness. He made his Eerste Divisie debut on 27 October 1990, in a 2–0 defeat at VVV-Venlo. Head coach Niels Overweg dismissed him after he turned up late to a match.

He began training with AZ Alkmaar, where his brother Carlos was playing and impressed enough to win a professional contract. However, Head coach Henk Wullems opted not to renew his contract in 1993, despite Hasselbaink making 46 appearances for the club. He had an unsuccessful trial with FC Eindhoven, and after failing to agree terms with PEC Zwolle he instead spent the 1993–94 season training with HFC Haarlem. He then played amateur football for Neerlandia whilst he looked abroad for a professional contract, spending time in Austria with Admira Wacker.

=== Portugal ===
Hasselbaink signed for newly promoted Portuguese Primeira Divisão side Campomaiorense in August 1995 after impressing trainer Manuel Fernandes on a trial. The chairman wanted to keep his signing a secret and so told the press that he had signed a player called "Jimmy", but after his signing was revealed the name stuck and he was known as Jimmy rather than Jerrel for the rest of his career. He failed to score in his first four games and missed a penalty in his fifth game after insisting on taking the penalty ahead of regular taker Stanimir Stoilov, however, he made amends for the miss later in the game by scoring both goals in a 2–0 win over Gil Vicente. The small club could not survive in the top flight and were relegated in the 1995–96 season.

Hasselbaink was signed by Boavista for a €300,000 fee in summer 1996. The 1996–97 season was chaotic for the club, as the chairman dismissed two managers, Zoran Filipović and João Alves, before ending the campaign with Rui Casaca. As a result, the "Panthers" only managed a seventh-place finish, but they ended the campaign on a high note by winning the Taça de Portugal. Hasselbaink had a good season individually, finishing as the league's second-highest scorer behind Porto's Mário Jardel. He scored his first professional hat-trick at the club in a 3–1 victory over Marítimo at the Estádio do Bessa; he later scored a hat-trick in a 7–0 win over Gil Vicente, as did teammate Nuno Gomes. Though head coach Casaca left Hasselbaink on the bench due to his arranged transfer to Leeds, Hasselbaink entered the final of the Taça de Portugal as a late substitute for Erwin Sánchez as Boavista held on to a 3–2 win over Benfica.

=== Leeds United ===
Leeds United manager George Graham signed Hasselbaink in the summer of 1997 for a fee of £2 million. He scored on his Premier League debut in a 1–1 draw with Arsenal at Elland Road on 9 August, though initially he struggled to adapt to the pace of the English game. He scored only five league goals before Christmas but ended the campaign with 26 goals in all competitions following a strong second half of the season.

The following season, Hasselbaink's 18 goals in 36 appearances made him joint-winner (with Michael Owen and Dwight Yorke) of the Premier League Golden Boot as Leeds finished fourth in the league under the stewardship of new manager David O'Leary, thus winning the "Whites" a place in the UEFA Cup. However, he and his agent were dissatisfied with the contract offered by the club, and though he still had two years to run on his existing deal he was sold on. O'Leary claimed: "What he is looking for I don't think any club in the country could afford and I don't think there is anyone on that kind of money over here [in England]".

=== Atlético Madrid ===
On 4 August 1999, Hasselbaink signed a four-year contract with Atlético Madrid for a fee of 3 billion Spanish pesetas (€18 million). His buyout clause was set at 5 billion pesetas (€30 million) and his weekly wage as 10 million pesetas (€60,000). The "Red-and-Whites" lost the first three La Liga games of the 1999–2000 season, but after Hasselbaink scored his first goal for the club to secure a point at Real Zaragoza he continued to score important goals for the club. On 30 October, he scored twice in the Madrid Derby as Atlético beat Real Madrid at the Santiago Bernabéu Stadium for the first time in nine years. He also scored against Barcelona at Camp Nou, in a 2–1 league defeat.

Manager Claudio Ranieri aimed to qualify for the Champions League but resigned in February following poor results. The club's league form did not improve following Ranieri's departure, and his successor Radomir Antić failed to prevent the club from being relegated to the Segunda División; Hasselbaink missed a penalty in a 2–2 draw away to Real Oviedo that secured relegation with two games remaining. With 24 goals, Hasselbaink shared the league's Silver Boot award with Catanha (Málaga CF), scoring only three goals fewer than top-scorer Salva Ballesta (Racing de Santander). Atlético reached the final of the Copa del Rey at the Mestalla Stadium but lost 2–1 to Espanyol; Hasselbaink scored a late consolation goal.

=== Chelsea ===
Hasselbaink returned to the Premier League in May 2000, when he was signed by Chelsea for a club record fee of £15 million, which matched the then-transfer record for an English club; he signed a four-year contract. He scored on his "Blues" debut, helping them to win the 2000 FA Charity Shield with a 2–0 win over Manchester United at Wembley Stadium. Manager Gianluca Vialli was dismissed in September, and Hasselbaink's former Atlético Madrid boss Claudio Ranieri was appointed as his replacement. Hasselbaink later stated he was "dismayed" at Vialli's dismissal and that the players hated Ranieri and fitness coach Roberto Sassi's running-focused training methods. Despite this, Hasselbaink scored 23 goals in 35 league appearances in the 2000–01 season, including four goals in a 6–1 win against Coventry City on 21 October; he finished the season as the winner of the Premier League Golden Boot.

At the start of the 2001–02 season, Hasselbaink earned the distinction of scoring the first competitive goal at Southampton's new St Mary's Stadium as Chelsea won 2–0 on 25 August. He was sent off by referee Mark Halsey on 23 January in a 5–1 loss away to Tottenham Hotspur in the League Cup semi-finals, having been mistaken for Mario Melchiot, who had put his hand to Teddy Sheringham's face; his three-match suspension was transferred to Melchiot instead. On 13 March, he scored a hat-trick as Chelsea defeated Tottenham 4–0. He formed both a good friendship and a productive partnership with Icelandic striker Eiður Guðjohnsen, scoring 29 goals in all competitions whilst Guðjohnsen scored 23 goals in a season which also saw Chelsea reach the FA Cup final. Hasselbaink was a doubt for the final due to a hamstring injury, and was substituted on 68 minutes at the Millennium Stadium as Chelsea lost 2–0 to rivals Arsenal. His total of 23 league goals was one fewer than Golden Boot winner Thierry Henry.

In the summer of 2002, the cause of his hamstring injury was discovered, and he underwent an operation to relieve a blockage in the arteries of his right leg, which had been severely restricting circulation. During his recovery, he appeared as a pundit for ITV's coverage of the 2002 FIFA World Cup. Ranieri initiated a squad rotation system for the 2002–03 season but focused the team around Gianfranco Zola, which limited Hasselbaink's playing time. Barcelona manager Louis van Gaal agreed an £8 million transfer for Hasselbaink in the January transfer window after months of negotiations but was dismissed before the transfer went through and the deal subsequently collapsed. Though the attack was focused on Zola throughout the season, Hasselbaink managed to score 15 goals in 44 games, only one goal fewer than Zola.

Towards the end of the 2002–03 season, Chelsea's financial situation improved and Ranieri told Hasselbaink that he was out of favour as the club could afford new strikers. New owner Roman Abramovich provided funds to sign Adrian Mutu and Hernán Crespo and Ranieri did not choose Hasselbaink in UEFA Champions League qualifying games. On 17 August 2003, in the first league game of the new season, Hasselbaink came on as a half-time substitute for Guðjohnsen and scored the late winner in a 2–1 victory away to Liverpool. On 27 March, his 32nd birthday, Hasselbaink came on as a 60th-minute substitute for Geremi and scored a hat-trick as Chelsea came from behind to beat Wolverhampton Wanderers 5–2 at Stamford Bridge. He scored 17 goals in all competitions, which made him top-scorer at the club for the third time in four years. Chelsea finished the season in second place and reached the semi-finals of the Champions League; Hasselbaink played in both legs of the semi-final defeat to Monaco, as Chelsea lost 5–3 on aggregate.

In 2004, Ranieri was sacked and succeeded by José Mourinho, whom Hasselbaink saw only once and never spoke to. Hasselbaink reflected in 2021 that Mourinho used him as an example that he could remove and replace any player at the club.

=== Middlesbrough ===
In July 2004, Hasselbaink turned down approaches from Fulham, Celtic and Rangers and instead joined Middlesbrough on a two-year contract after a free transfer. Due to several other internationals being signed by the club at the time, he predicted that Middlesbrough could qualify for the Champions League. On 14 August, he scored on his debut for the club in a 2–2 draw with Newcastle United at the Riverside Stadium. In the 2004–05 season he finished as the club's top-scorer with 13 goals in 36 Premier League games, including a hat-trick in a 4–0 win over Blackburn Rovers at Ewood Park on 16 October. A seventh-place league finish was enough for the club to qualify for the following year's UEFA Cup.

In the 2005–06 season, he scored nine goals in 22 league games and eight in 22 cup appearances. He helped Steve McClaren's "Boro" reach the UEFA Cup final; on 6 April he and fellow forwards Mark Viduka and Massimo Maccarone scored in a 4–1 home win over Switzerland's Basel in the second leg of the quarter-finals, after a 2–0 loss in the first leg. In the final, Middlesbrough were beaten 4–0 by Spanish club Sevilla at the Philips Stadion. The cup final proved to be Hasselbaink's last appearance for the club, as new manager Gareth Southgate decided to release him in July 2006.

=== Charlton Athletic ===
After a potential move to Celtic of the Scottish Premier League broke down, Hasselbaink joined his fourth Premier League team, Charlton Athletic, on a free transfer in July 2006. Soon after joining the club, he was charged by the FA with improper conduct and/or bringing the game into disrepute for his claiming Chelsea paid players a bonus after the 2004 Champions League win over Arsenal; a Premier League inquiry into what would have been illegal bonus payments found no evidence to support the claims, which were denied by Chelsea. He scored his first goal for the "Addicks" against his old team Chelsea in a 2–1 defeat at Stamford Bridge on 9 September. After seven games without a goal, Hasselbaink scored against yet another of his former clubs, Middlesbrough, on 13 January, a game which Middlesbrough went on to win 3–1. He was released by Charlton at the end of the 2006–07 season having scored only four goals in 29 games, with half of his goal tally coming against League One side Chesterfield in the League Cup.

=== Cardiff City ===
Hasselbaink was on the verge of joining Championship side Leicester City in August 2007, but the club later withdrew their offer. Instead Cardiff City chairman Peter Ridsdale, who worked with Hasselbaink at Leeds United, brought him to Cardiff on a one-year deal, putting him in a veteran strike partnership with Robbie Fowler. Manager Dave Jones said that Hasselbaink initially took time to settle and become match fit but despite being a demanding player his professionalism was ultimately a positive influence. On 19 September, Hasselbaink scored his first goal for Cardiff with a 20-yard low drive in the 2–1 league defeat to Watford at Ninian Park. He was nominated for the Player of the Round in the Fifth Round of the FA Cup after scoring an impressive goal against Wolverhampton Wanderers. He remained as a regular starter for the "Bluebirds" throughout the 2007–08 season, and made appearances in five of the six matches Cardiff played to reach the FA Cup final. In the final Cardiff lost 1–0 to Portsmouth; Hasselbaink played 70 minutes before being substituted for Steve Thompson. As the season finished he entered talks to extend his stay at Cardiff; however, he left the club in July 2008 following a dispute over pay.

== International career ==
Hasselbaink came to the attention of Netherlands manager Guus Hiddink whilst playing in England for Leeds United and made his international debut on 27 May 1998 in a 0–0 draw in a friendly with Cameroon at the GelreDome in Arnhem; he came on as a 61st-minute substitute for Marc Overmars. On 1 June, he scored his first goal in a 5–1 friendly victory over Paraguay, and a few days later scored his second goal in another 5–1 friendly victory over Nigeria. He was part of the Dutch squad for the 1998 FIFA World Cup in France, as back-up to established international strikers Patrick Kluivert, Dennis Bergkamp and Pierre van Hooijdonk and wingers Boudewijn Zenden and Marc Overmars. With other strikers not fully fit, Hasselbaink started the opening game against Belgium at the Stade de France, but missed a scoring opportunity in the 0–0 draw and was taken off for Bergkamp after 65 minutes. Kluivert was sent off in the match, but Bergkamp was played as the only striker in the next game against South Korea, and van Hooijdonk was taken off the bench to replace him. In the third group game against Mexico at the Stade Geoffroy-Guichard Hasselbaink came on for Bergkamp after 78 minutes, which was to be his last appearance at the tournament as Kluivert returned from suspension to leave Hasselbaink as Hiddink's fourth choice forward; Netherlands ended the tournament in fourth place.

Hiddink resigned and was replaced by his assistant Frank Rijkaard, who rarely picked Hasselbaink at international level. Hasselbaink next played on 18 August 1999, alongside Kluivert and Ruud van Nistelrooy in a friendly against Denmark; he was taken off for Clarence Seedorf, and the game ended 0–0. He next appeared six months later, playing ten minutes against Germany and 70 minutes against Scotland, and despite van Nistelrooy being injured Hasselbaink was not selected for UEFA Euro 2000 as the five forwards chosen were Bergkamp, Kluivert, van Hooijdonk, Roy Makaay and Peter van Vossen. He had been part of the 25-man initial squad but, along with André Ooijer and Winston Bogarde, was not chosen for the final 22.

Louis van Gaal rated Hasselbaink more highly than Rijkaard, meaning more chances at international level when van Gaal took over as manager in July 2000. Hasselbaink scored against Spain in a 2–1 win at the Estadio de La Cartuja on 15 November 2000 but both he and Spanish captain Fernando Hierro were sent off for fighting late in the game. On 24 March 2001, he scored in a 5–0 win over Andorra at the Mini Estadi, and four days later converted a penalty in a draw with Portugal at the Estádio das Antas. On 25 April he scored in his third successive World Cup qualifying game, in a 4–0 win over Cyprus at the Philips Stadion. He later played against Estonia (twice), England, the Republic of Ireland and Denmark; he scored a penalty past Denmark in a 1–1 draw at Parken Stadium. The Netherlands did not qualify for the 2002 FIFA World Cup as they finished four points behind Portugal and Ireland.

Dick Advocaat replaced van Gaal as national team manager in January 2002, and Hasselbaink remained in contention. On 21 August, he came on as a substitute in a 1–0 win over Norway at the Ullevaal Stadion, and on 7 September he scored in a 3–0 victory over Belarus, the opening game for Euro 2004 qualifying; this was his last appearance for Netherlands. Hasselbaink did not make the squad for the Euro 2004 finals but was on the stand-by list for the tournament.

== Style of play ==
Hasselbaink was a quick sprinter and had a powerful shot and physique, which allowed him to score from either inside or outside the area. He was able to shoot with his left foot despite being primarily right-footed. In addition to scoring goals, he was also capable of creating them for his teammates. Tom Sheen, sports reporter for The Independent and a Chelsea supporter, wrote that "[Hasselbaink] possessed one of the best strikes ever seen at Stamford Bridge, was an expert free-kick taker, great with both feet and decent in the air".

== Coaching career ==
In October 2009, Hasselbaink trained with Conference South side Woking to help keep himself fit and do some coaching. He then worked with Chelsea's under-16 squad and coached at the Nike Academy while taking his UEFA 'B' and 'A' licences. From July 2011 to January 2013 he was a member of the coaching staff at Nottingham Forest, leaving the club when manager Sean O'Driscoll was dismissed.

=== Royal Antwerp ===
In May 2013, Hasselbaink was announced as the new manager of newly relegated Belgian Second Division club Royal Antwerp. He stated that the club was "a two or three year project" and he aimed to win promotion by playing attacking football with younger players on a reduced budget. He made a number of signings for the club, including former England under-19 international John Bostock. He led the club to a seventh-place finish in the 2013–14 season, before turning down a new deal at the club in May 2014.

=== Burton Albion ===
On 13 November 2014, Hasselbaink was appointed manager at League Two side Burton Albion. He signed a two-and-a-half-year contract, stating that he was attracted to Burton by the club's stability. Four days after his appointment he took charge of his first game at Burton, a 3–1 win at Wycombe Wanderers which moved the club into fourth in the table. He was nominated for the League Two Manager of the Month award in January for going unbeaten in the month and leading the club to victories over promotion rivals Shrewsbury Town and Bury; however Chris Wilder of Northampton Town won the award. On 18 April, Burton won 2–1 away at Morecambe to earn promotion to League One for the first time in their history. Two weeks later, Burton came from 2–1 down, with ten men following the dismissal of goalkeeper Jon McLaughlin, to defeat Cambridge United 3–2 at the Abbey Stadium and win the League Two title. He was named as League One Manager of the Month for September 2015 after overseeing three wins in five games for the division's newcomers. At the time of his departure Burton were top of League One.

=== Queens Park Rangers ===
On 4 December 2015, Hasselbaink was appointed as manager of Championship club Queens Park Rangers; he signed on a rolling contract, alongside his assistant David Oldfield. Eight days later, he took charge of them for the first time, in a goalless draw against Burnley at Loftus Road. After the game, he commented that his team were low on confidence, and needed to be given room to express themselves and "play with freedom". Despite the sale of leading scorer Charlie Austin earlier the same day, Hasselbaink earned his first win in charge of the "Hoops" on 16 January 2016, a 3–0 victory at Rotherham United. He guided them to a 12th-place finish, and spoke of his expectations of a busy summer in the transfer market. He was dismissed on 5 November 2016, with QPR in 17th place.

Hasselbaink is one of the few black football managers in England. After being hired by QPR, he was asked by Talksport if he felt that he had added responsibilities as a black manager, to which he answered:

No responsibility whatsoever. I'm a big believer that I got this job because I did well at my previous club and that I am the right man for it – that's why the club has given me the opportunity. I am black, that's not going to change. I am proud to be black and that's also not going to change. That’s how it is.

Shortly afterwards, Port Vale chairman Norman Smurthwaite said that he had rejected Hasselbaink for the vacant managerial position at his club in 2014, out of fear that racist elements of their support would abuse him.

On 28 September 2016, Hasselbaink was named and shown in The Daily Telegraph's sting operation involving exposing football management personalities engaging in improper conduct. Hasselbaink negotiated a deal to work with a fictitious Far Eastern firm looking to become involved in the transfer of footballers. Additionally, Hasselbaink, despite the conflict of interest, was open to the idea of signing players represented by the firm. Queens Park Rangers launched an internal investigation and went on to release a statement fully backing Hasselbaink and stated that The Daily Telegraph failed to provide sufficient evidence regarding their sting operation.

=== Northampton Town ===
On 4 September 2017, Hasselbaink was appointed manager of League One club Northampton Town on a three-year deal, replacing Justin Edinburgh who had been sacked after four losses from the start of the season. His first game was against Doncaster Rovers five days later, a home tie which ended in a 1–0 victory for Northampton Town. He was sacked on 2 April 2018 after a loss to Peterborough United made it nine games without a win and had the "Cobblers" in the relegation zone with five games remaining of the 2017–18 season.

=== Return to Burton Albion ===
On New Year's Day 2021, Hasselbaink was appointed manager of Burton Albion for the second time in his career. He made seven permanent and five loan signings, mostly younger players in addition to 33-year old veteran defender Michael Mancienne. Burton finished 16th at the end of the 2021–22 season and he admitted that there was "quite a lot of work to be done" behind the scenes. He held talks with Barnsley in the summer but chose to remain with Burton. He resigned as Burton Albion manager on 5 September 2022 with his team sitting bottom of the table with one point out of seven games, claiming that he had "taken the club as far as I can with the limited resources available".

=== England national team ===
In March 2023, Hasselbaink was hired as a coach for the England national team, in a move that reunited him with former Middlesbrough teammate Gareth Southgate. In August 2024, following Southgate's departure in the aftermath of England's UEFA Euro 2024 final defeat, Hasselbaink also departed his role as assistant head coach.

=== Suriname national team ===
In December 2025, Hasselbaink was announced as assistant coach for the Suriname national team, joining a coaching staff with Winston Bogarde under head coach Henk ten Cate.

== Personal life ==
Hasselbaink has four daughters. He is the uncle of Nigel Hasselbaink, a professional footballer and the younger brother of former Haarlem winger Carlos Hasselbaink.

During his time at Chelsea, Hasselbaink and close friend and strike partner Eiður Guðjohnsen developed problem gambling at London casinos. Hasselbaink reflected in 2005 that he once lost £40,000 in one night and "big wins are worse because you think it’s normal. You go back expecting the same – and you get trapped".

In August 2025, Hasselbaink was announced as a contestant on the twenty-third series of Strictly Come Dancing. He was partnered with Lauren Oakley and made it to the fifth week before being eliminated by the judges after insufficient votes from the public. All four judges saved Amber Davies in the show's danceoff after reprising their live dances from said week.

== Career statistics ==
=== Club ===
Appearances and goals by club, season and competition
Club	Season	League			National cup (Note: Includes KNVB Cup, Taça de Portugal, FA Cup, Copa del Rey)		League cup (Note: Includes Football League Cup, Taça da Liga)		Europe (Note: Includes UEFA Champions League, UEFA Cup)		Other		Total	
Club	Season	Division	Apps	Goals	Apps	Goals	Apps	Goals	Apps	Goals	Apps	Goals	Apps	Goals
Telstar	1990–91	Eerste Divisie	4	0			—		–		–		4	0
AZ Alkmaar	1991–92	Eerste Divisie	26	2			–		–		–		26	2
AZ Alkmaar	1992–93	Eerste Divisie	9	0			–		–		–		9	0
AZ Alkmaar	Total		35	2			0	0	0	0	0	0	35	2
Campomaiorense	1995–96	Primeira Divisão	31	12	3	0	–		–		–		34	12
Boavista	1996–97	Primeira Divisão	29	20	4	1	–		5	3	–		38	24
Leeds United	1997–98	Premier League	33	16	4	4	3	2	–		–		40	22
Leeds United	1998–99	Premier League	36	18	5	1	2	0	4	1	–		47	20
Leeds United	Total		69	34	9	5	5	2	4	1	0	0	87	42
Atlético Madrid	1999–2000	La Liga	34	24	2	2	–		7	7	–		43	33
Chelsea	2000–01	Premier League	35	23	2	2	1	0	2	0	1 (Note: Appearance in FA Community Shield)	1	41	26
Chelsea	2001–02	Premier League	35	23	7	3	4	3	2	0	–		48	29
Chelsea	2002–03	Premier League	36	11	4	1	2	2	2	1	–		44	15
Chelsea	2003–04	Premier League	30	12	3	1	3	2	8	2	–		44	17
Chelsea	Total		136	69	16	7	10	7	14	3	1	1	177	87
Middlesbrough	2004–05	Premier League	36	13	2	0	0	0	7	3	–		45	16
Middlesbrough	2005–06	Premier League	22	9	6	3	3	1	13	4	–		44	17
Middlesbrough	Total		58	22	8	3	3	1	20	7	0	0	89	33
Charlton Athletic	2006–07	Premier League	25	2	1	0	3	2	–		–		29	4
Cardiff City	2007–08	Championship	36	7	5	1	3	1	–		–		44	9
Career total			457	192	48	19	24	13	50	21	1	1	580	246

=== International ===
Appearances and goals by national team and year
National team	Year	Apps	Goals
Netherlands	1998	5	2
Netherlands	1999	1	0
Netherlands	2000	3	1
Netherlands	2001	8	4
Netherlands	2002	6	2
Total		23	9

Scores and results list Netherlands' goal tally first, score column indicates score after each Hasselbaink goal.

List of international goals scored by Jimmy Floyd Hasselbaink
No.	Date	Venue	Cap	Opponent	Score	Result	Competition
1	1 June 1998	Philips Stadion, Eindhoven, Netherlands	2	Paraguay	5–1	5–1	Friendly
2	5 June 1998	Amsterdam Arena, Amsterdam, Netherlands	3	Nigeria	1–0	5–1	Friendly
3	15 November 2000	Estadio de La Cartuja, Seville, Spain	9	Spain	1–1	2–1	Friendly
4	24 March 2001	Mini Estadi, Barcelona, Spain	10	Andorra	2–0	5–0	2002 FIFA World Cup qualification
5	28 March 2001	Estádio das Antas, Porto, Portugal	11	Portugal	1–0	2–2	2002 FIFA World Cup qualification
6	25 April 2001	Philips Stadion, Eindhoven, Netherlands	12	Cyprus	1–0	4–0	2002 FIFA World Cup qualification
7	10 November 2001	Parken Stadium, Copenhagen, Denmark	17	Denmark	1–0	1–1	Friendly
8	7 September 2002	Philips Stadion, Eindhoven, Netherlands	21	Belarus	3–0	3–0	UEFA Euro 2004 qualifying
9	20 November 2002	Arena AufSchalke, Gelsenkirchen, Germany	23	Germany	2–1	3–1	Friendly

=== Managerial statistics ===
As of match played 3 September 2022

Managerial record by team and tenure
Team	From	To	Record					Ref
Team	From	To	P	W	D	L	Win %	Ref
Royal Antwerp	29 May 2013	11 May 2014	35	13	10	12	37.1	
Burton Albion	13 November 2014	4 December 2015	54	33	11	10	61.1	
Queens Park Rangers	4 December 2015	5 November 2016	47	13	19	15	27.7	
Northampton Town	4 September 2017	2 April 2018	42	10	13	19	23.8	
Burton Albion	1 January 2021	5 September 2022	85	30	18	37	35.3	
Total			262	98	71	93	37.4	—

== Honours ==
=== Player ===
Boavista

- Taça de Portugal: 1996–97

Atlético Madrid

- Copa del Rey runner-up: 1999–2000

Chelsea

- FA Charity Shield: 2000
- FA Cup runner-up: 2001–02

Middlesbrough

- UEFA Cup runner-up: 2005–06

Cardiff City

- FA Cup runner-up: 2007–08

Individual

- Premier League Golden Boot: 1998–99 (shared), 2000–01
- Most assists in the Premier League: 1998–99 (shared)
- Copa del Rey top-scorer: 1999–2000 (shared)

=== Manager ===
Burton Albion

- Football League Two: 2014–15

Individual

- Football League One Manager of the Month: September 2015

=== Assistant coach ===
England

- UEFA European Championship runner-up: 2024
