= 2000–01 Chelsea F.C. season =

English football club season

Chelsea
2000–01 season
- Chairman: Ken Bates
- Manager: Gianluca Vialli (until 12 September 2000); Claudio Ranieri (from 18 September 2000)
- FA Premier League: 6th
- FA Cup: Fifth round
- League Cup: Third round
- FA Charity Shield: Winners
- UEFA Cup: First round
- Top goalscorer: League: Jimmy Floyd Hasselbaink (23); All: Jimmy Floyd Hasselbaink (26)
- Average home league attendance: 34,700
Home colours	Away colours

The 2000–01 season was Chelsea F.C.'s 87th competitive season, ninth consecutive season in the FA Premier League and 95th year as a club.

== Season summary ==
A slow start to the season cost manager Gianluca Vialli his job, despite having won five trophies since his appointment in February 1998. The last of these trophies came at the start of the season when they defeated Manchester United 2–0 in the Charity Shield to win the last-ever club game at the pre-redevelopment Wembley. Vialli's successor was Claudio Ranieri, who guided the club to sixth place in the final table and attained automatic qualification for the UEFA Cup.

The biggest success of the season was the effectiveness of club record signing Jimmy Floyd Hasselbaink, who found the net 23 times in 35 Premiership games in a partnership with Chelsea's 34-year-old Italian superstar, Gianfranco Zola, who found the net on 9 occasions.

== Team kit ==
The team kit was produced by Umbro and the shirt sponsor was Autoglass. Chelsea's home kit was all blue with a white trimmed collar. The club's third kit for this season was orange with blue shorts and accents.

== Final league table ==
Pos	Team	Pld	W	D	L	GF	GA	GD	Pts	Qualification or relegation
4	Leeds United	38	20	8	10	64	43	+21	68	Qualification for the UEFA Cup first round (Note: Since Liverpool won the League Cup and qualified for the Champions League, their UEFA Cup place went to fifth-placed Ipswich Town. Since both FA Cup finalists, Liverpool and Arsenal, qualified for the Champions League, the berth in the UEFA Cup went to sixth-placed Chelsea. Both Ipswich and Chelsea were the highest-ranked team not already qualified for a European competition.)
5	Ipswich Town	38	20	6	12	57	42	+15	66	Qualification for the UEFA Cup first round
6	Chelsea	38	17	10	11	68	45	+23	61	Qualification for the UEFA Cup first round
7	Sunderland	38	15	12	11	46	41	+5	57	
8	Aston Villa	38	13	15	10	46	43	+3	54	Qualification for the Intertoto Cup third round

Source: Premier League
Rules for classification: 1) points; 2) goal difference; 3) number of goals scored.
Notes:

Results summary

Overall								Home						Away					
Pld	W	D	L	GF	GA	GD	Pts	W	D	L	GF	GA	GD	W	D	L	GF	GA	GD
38	17	10	11	68	45	+23	61	13	3	3	44	20	+24	4	7	8	24	25	−1

Source: 2000–01 FA Premier League table

Results by round

Round	1	2	3	4	5	6	7	8	9	10	11	12	13	14	15	16	17	18	19	20	21	22	23	24	25	26	27	28	29	30	31	32	33	34	35	36	37	38
Ground	H	A	A	H	A	H	A	H	A	H	H	A	H	A	A	H	H	A	H	A	H	A	H	H	A	H	A	A	H	H	A	H	A	H	A	H	A	A
Result	W	L	D	D	D	L	D	W	L	W	W	L	D	L	L	W	W	L	W	D	W	D	W	W	L	D	D	W	L	W	W	W	W	L	L	W	D	W
Position	2	9	10	11	10	17	16	12	15	10	6	10	10	13	14	14	11	12	9	10	9	9	8	6	8	8	10	8	9	7	6	5	5	5	6	6	6	6

Source: 11v11.com: 2000-01 Chelsea results
A = Away; H = Home; W = Win; D = Draw; L = Loss

== Results ==
=== Charity Shield ===
13 August 2000 Final	Chelsea	2–0	Manchester United	Brent, London
15:00 UTC+1	Hasselbaink 22'; Melchiot 73'	Report		Stadium: Wembley Stadium; Attendance: 65,148; Referee: Mike Riley

=== Premier League ===
19 August 2000 1	Chelsea	4–2	West Ham United	Fulham, London
	Hasselbaink 30' (pen.); Zola 59'; Stanić 78', 90'	Report	Di Canio 48'; Kanouté 85'	Stadium: Stamford Bridge; Referee: Graham Barber

22 August 2000 2	Bradford City	2–0	Chelsea	Bradford, West Yorkshire
	Windass 24'; Carbone 74'	Report		Stadium: Valley Parade; Referee: Mark Halsey

27 August 2000 3	Aston Villa	1–1	Chelsea	Birmingham, West Midlands
	Nilis 10'	Report	Desailly 31'	Stadium: Villa Park; Referee: Paul Durkin

6 September 2000 4	Chelsea	2–2	Arsenal	Fulham, London
	Hasselbaink 31'; Zola 58'	Report	Henry 76'; Sylvinho 86'	Stadium: Stamford Bridge; Referee: Mike Riley

9 September 2000 5	Newcastle United	0–0	Chelsea	Newcastle upon Tyne, Tyneside
		Report		Stadium: St. James' Park; Referee: Graham Poll

17 September 2000 6	Chelsea	0–2	Leicester City	Fulham, London
		Report	Izzet 8'; Collymore 82'	Stadium: Stamford Bridge; Referee: Graham Barber

23 September 2000 7	Manchester United	3–3	Chelsea	Trafford, Greater Manchester
	Scholes 17'; Sheringham 37'; Beckham 39'	Report	Hasselbaink 8'; Flo 45', 70'	Stadium: Old Trafford; Referee: Peter Jones

1 October 2000 8	Chelsea	3–0	Liverpool	Fulham, London
	Westerveld 10' (o.g.); Hasselbaink 11'; Guðjohnsen 71'	Report		Stadium: Stamford Bridge; Referee: Dermot Gallagher

14 October 2000 9	Sunderland	1–0	Chelsea	Sunderland
	Phillips 63'	Report		Stadium: Stadium of Light; Referee: Jeff Winter

21 October 2000 10	Chelsea	6–1	Coventry City	Fulham, London
	Hasselbaink 24' (pen.), 42', 52', 58'; Zola 48'; Flo 68'	Report	Roussel 89'	Stadium: Stamford Bridge; Referee: Stephen Lodge

28 October 2000 11	Chelsea	3–0	Tottenham Hotspur	Fulham, London
	Hasselbaink 13' (pen.), 87'; Zola 39'	Report		Stadium: Stamford Bridge; Referee: Steve Dunn

4 November 2000 12	Southampton	3–2	Chelsea	Southampton, Hampshire
	Beattie 3', 90'; Tessem 37'	Report	Wise 69'; Poyet 78'	Stadium: The Dell; Referee: Jeff Winter

12 November 2000 13	Chelsea	1–1	Leeds United	Fulham, London
	Poyet 78'	Report	Viduka 62'	Stadium: Stamford Bridge; Referee: Graham Poll

18 November 2000 14	Charlton Athletic	2–0	Chelsea	Greenwich, London
	Johansson 35'; Pringle 90'	Report		Stadium: The Valley; Referee: Paul Durkin

25 November 2000 15	Everton	2–1	Chelsea	Liverpool, Merseyside
	Cadamarteri 47'; K. Campbell 74'	Report	Dalla Bona 45'	Stadium: Goodison Park; Referee: Rob Styles

3 December 2000 16	Chelsea	2–1	Manchester City	Fulham, London
	Zola 28'; Hasselbaink 45'	Report	Dickov 82'	Stadium: Stamford Bridge; Referee: Dermot Gallagher

9 December 2000 17	Chelsea	4–1	Derby County	Fulham, London
	Guðjohnsen 10', 16'; Poyet 37'; Zola 54'	Report	Riggott 56'	Stadium: Stamford Bridge; Referee: Paul Taylor

16 December 2000 18	Middlesbrough	1–0	Chelsea	Middlesbrough, North Yorkshire
	Gordon 71'	Report		Stadium: Riverside Stadium; Referee: Peter Jones

23 December 2000 19	Chelsea	3–0	Bradford City	Fulham, London
	Poyet 22'; Dalla Bona 68'; Guðjohnsen 90'	Report		Stadium: Stamford Bridge; Referee: Barry Knight

26 December 2000 20	Ipswich Town	2–2	Chelsea	Ipswich, Suffolk
	Scowcroft 43'; Stewart 82'	Report	Guðjohnsen 8', 17'	Stadium: Portman Road; Referee: Jeff Winter

1 January 2001 21	Chelsea	1–0	Aston Villa	Fulham, London
	Hasselbaink 45'	Report		Stadium: Stamford Bridge; Referee: Paul Durkin

13 January 2001 22	Arsenal	1–1	Chelsea	Islington, London
	Pires 3'	Report	Terry 62'	Stadium: Highbury; Referee: David Elleray

20 January 2001 23	Chelsea	4–1	Ipswich Town	Fulham, London
	Poyet 45', 65'; Wise 58'; Hasselbaink 75' (pen.)	Report	Stewart 23'	Stadium: Stamford Bridge; Referee: Andy D'Urso

31 January 2001 24	Chelsea	3–1	Newcastle United	Fulham, London
	Zola 37'; Poyet 62'; Grønkjær 79'	Report	Bassedas 23'	Stadium: Stamford Bridge; Referee: Mark Halsey

3 February 2001 25	Leicester City	2–1	Chelsea	Leicester, Leicestershire
	Izzet 24'; Rowett 76'	Report	Hasselbaink 75'	Stadium: Filbert Street; Referee: Steve Dunn

10 February 2001 26	Chelsea	1–1	Manchester United	Fulham, London
	Hasselbaink 24'	Report	A. Cole 69'	Stadium: Stamford Bridge; Referee: David Elleray

3 March 2001 27	Coventry City	0–0	Chelsea	Coventry, West Midlands
		Report		Stadium: Highfield Road; Referee: Steve Bennett

7 March 2001 28	West Ham United	0–2	Chelsea	Newham, London
		Report	Guðjohnsen 32'; Hasselbaink 38'	Stadium: Boleyn Ground; Referee: Alan Wiley

17 March 2001 29	Chelsea	2–4	Sunderland	Fulham, London
	Desailly 15'; Guðjohnsen 38'	Report	Hutchison 28', 52'; McCann 61'; Phillips 79'	Stadium: Stamford Bridge; Referee: Paul Durkin

31 March 2001 30	Chelsea	2–1	Middlesbrough	Fulham, London
	Zola 35'; Guðjohnsen 63'	Report	Windass 54'	Stadium: Stamford Bridge; Referee: Peter Jones

7 April 2001 31	Derby County	0–4	Chelsea	Derby, Derbyshire
		Report	Zola 64'; Hasselbaink 85'; Poyet 89', 90'	Stadium: Pride Park Stadium; Referee: Steve Lodge

14 April 2001 32	Chelsea	1–0	Southampton	Fulham, London
	Poyet 43'	Report		Stadium: Stamford Bridge; Referee: Chris Wilkes

17 April 2001 33	Tottenham Hotspur	0–3	Chelsea	Haringey, London
		Report	Hasselbaink 29'; Poyet 60'; Guðjohnsen 90'	Stadium: White Hart Lane; Referee: Graham Barber

21 April 2001 34	Chelsea	0–1	Charlton Athletic	Fulham, London
		Report	Bartlett 35'	Stadium: Stamford Bridge; Referee: Mike Dean

28 April 2001 35	Leeds United	2–0	Chelsea	Leeds, West Yorkshire
	Keane 85'; Viduka 88'	Report		Stadium: Elland Road; Referee: Steve Dunn

5 May 2001 36	Chelsea	2–1	Everton	Fulham, London
	Hasselbaink 32', 35'	Report	K. Campbell 3'	Stadium: Stamford Bridge; Referee: Rob Styles

8 May 2001 37	Liverpool	2–2	Chelsea	Liverpool, Merseyside
	Owen 8', 60'	Report	Hasselbaink 13', 67'	Stadium: Anfield; Referee: Mike Riley

19 May 2001 38	Manchester City	1–2	Chelsea	Manchester, Greater Manchester
	Howey 39'	Report	Wise 19'; Hasselbaink 62'	Stadium: Maine Road; Referee: Mike Riley

=== UEFA Cup ===
==== First round ====
14 September 2000 1st leg	Chelsea (England)	1–0	(Switzerland) St. Gallen	London, England
	Panucci 22'	Report		Stadium: Stamford Bridge; Attendance: 18,196; Referee: (Spain) Victor José Esquinas Torres

28 September 2000 2nd leg	St. Gallen (Switzerland)	2–0	(England) Chelsea	St. Gallen, Switzerland
	Müller 19'; Amoah 37'	Report		Stadium: Hardturm; Attendance: 15,500; Referee: (France) Pascal Garibian

=== FA Cup ===
6 January 2001 Third round	Chelsea	5–0	Peterborough United	Fulham, London
	Zola 37', 84'; Hasselbaink 45'; Guðjohnsen 72'; Poyet 74'	Report		Stadium: Stamford Bridge; Attendance: 31,912; Referee: Clive Wilkes

28 January 2001 Fourth round	Gillingham	2–4	Chelsea	Gillingham, Kent
	Shaw 51'; Onuora 65'	Report	Guðjohnsen 3', 90'; Gronkjaer 13', 24'	Stadium: Priestfield Stadium; Attendance: 10,419; Referee: Dermot Gallagher

18 February 2001 Fifth round	Arsenal	3–1	Chelsea	Islington, London
	Henry 52'; Wiltord 75', 83'	Report	Hasselbaink 61'	Stadium: Highbury; Attendance: 38,096; Referee: Graham Barber

=== Worthington Cup ===
1 November 2000 Third round	Liverpool	2–1 (a.e.t.)	Chelsea	Liverpool, Merseyside
	Murphy 11'; Fowler 104'	Report	Zola 29'	Stadium: Anfield; Attendance: 29,370; Referee: Rob Harris

== First team squad ==
Squad at end of season

Note: Flags indicate national team as defined under FIFA eligibility rules; some limited exceptions apply. Players may hold more than one non-FIFA nationality.

No.	Pos.	Nation	Player
1	GK	NED	Ed de Goey
3	DF	NGR	Celestine Babayaro
5	DF	FRA	Frank Leboeuf
6	DF	FRA	Marcel Desailly (captain)
7	DF	NED	Winston Bogarde
8	MF	URU	Gus Poyet
9	FW	NED	Jimmy Floyd Hasselbaink
10	MF	YUG	Slaviša Jokanović
11	MF	ENG	Dennis Wise (Vice-captain)
12	FW	CRO	Mario Stanić
13	GK	ENG	Kevin Hitchcock
14	DF	ENG	Graeme Le Saux
15	DF	NED	Mario Melchiot
16	MF	ITA	Roberto Di Matteo
17	MF	ESP	Albert Ferrer
18	MF	ITA	Gabriele Ambrosetti
19	DF	RSA	Pierre Issa (on loan from Marseille)

No.	Pos.	Nation	Player
20	MF	ENG	Jody Morris
21	DF	FRA	Bernard Lambourde
22	FW	ISL	Eiður Guðjohnsen
23	GK	ITA	Carlo Cudicini
24	MF	ITA	Samuele Dalla Bona
25	FW	ITA	Gianfranco Zola
26	DF	ENG	John Terry
27	FW	GEO	Rati Aleksidze
28	DF	WAL	Danny Slatter
30	FW	DEN	Jesper Grønkjær
31	GK	AUS	Mark Bosnich
32	FW	FIN	Mikael Forssell
34	DF	ENG	Jon Harley
36	FW	ENG	Leon Knight
37	FW	ENG	Mark Nicholls (on loan to Colchester United)
39	MF	ENG	Rob Wolleaston

=== Left club during season ===
Note: Flags indicate national team as defined under FIFA eligibility rules; some limited exceptions apply. Players may hold more than one non-FIFA nationality.

No.	Pos.	Nation	Player
2	DF	ITA	Christian Panucci (on loan from Internazionale)
4	DF	DEN	Jes Høgh (retired)
19	FW	NOR	Tore André Flo (to Rangers)

No.	Pos.	Nation	Player
30	DF	BRA	Emerson Thome (to Sunderland)
33	DF	ITA	Luca Percassi (to Monza)

=== Reserve squad ===
Note: Flags indicate national team as defined under FIFA eligibility rules; some limited exceptions apply. Players may hold more than one non-FIFA nationality.

No.	Pos.	Nation	Player
—	GK	ENG	Rhys Evans
—	DF	ENG	Stephen Broad (on loan to Southend United)
—	DF	ENG	Stuart Reddington
—	DF	ENG	Paul Thornton
—	DF	SCO	Warren Cummings
—	MF	ENG	Neil Barrett
—	MF	ENG	Shayne Demitrious

No.	Pos.	Nation	Player
—	MF	ENG	Joe Keenan
—	MF	ENG	Courtney Pitt
—	MF	ENG	Jay Richardson
—	MF	GER	Sebastian Kneißl
—	FW	ENG	Carlton Cole
—	FW	ENG	Sam Parkin (on loan to Millwall and Wycombe Wanderers)

== Transfers ==
=== In ===
#	Pos	Player	From	Fee	Date
9	CF	(Netherlands) Jimmy Floyd Hasselbaink	(Spain) Atlético Madrid	£15,000,000	31 May 2000
22	CF	(Iceland) Eiður Guðjohnsen	(England) Bolton Wanderers	£4,000,000	19 June 2000
12	MF	(Croatia) Mario Stanić	(Italy) Parma	£5,600,000	28 June 2000
23	GK	(Italy) Carlo Cudicini	(Italy) Castel di Sangro	Free	3 July 2000
7	DF	(Netherlands) Winston Bogarde	(Spain) Barcelona	Free	31 August 2000
10	MF	(Federal Republic of Yugoslavia) Slaviša Jokanović	(Spain) Deportivo	£1,700,000	10 October 2000
30	MF	(Denmark) Jesper Grønkjær	(Netherlands) Ajax	£7,800,000	29 December 2000
31	GK	(Australia) Mark Bosnich	(England) Manchester United	Free	18 January 2001

=== Out ===
#	Pos	Player	To	Fee	Date
9	FW	(England) Chris Sutton	(Scotland) Celtic	£6,000,000	10 July 2000
7	MF	(France) Didier Deschamps	(Spain) Valencia	£2,300,000	28 July 2000
19	FW	(Norway) Tore Andre Flo	(Scotland) Rangers	£12,000,000	23 November 2000

- Total spending: ▼£34,100,000
- Total income: ▲£20,000,000
- Overall loss/gain: ▼£14,100,000

== Statistics ==
No.	Pos	Nat	Player	Total		Premier League		UEFA Cup		FA Cup		League Cup	
No.	Pos	Nat	Player	Apps	Goals	Apps	Goals	Apps	Goals	Apps	Goals	Apps	Goals
1	GK	(Netherlands) NED	Ed de Goey	16	0	15	0	0	0	0	0	1	0
2	DF	(Italy) ITA	Christian Panucci	10	1	7+1	0	2	1	0	0	0	0
3	DF	(Nigeria) NGR	Celestine Babayaro	27	0	19+5	0	0	0	2	0	1	0
5	DF	(France) FRA	Frank Leboeuf	30	0	24+2	0	2	0	2	0	0	0
6	DF	(France) FRA	Marcel Desailly	38	2	34	2	1	0	2	0	1	0
7	DF	(Netherlands) NED	Winston Bogarde	11	0	9	0	1	0	0	0	1	0
8	MF	(Uruguay) URU	Gus Poyet	34	12	22+8	11	0	0	3	1	1	0
9	FW	(Netherlands) NED	Jimmy Floyd Hasselbaink	40	26	35	23	2	1	2	2	1	0
10	MF	(Federal Republic of Yugoslavia) YUG	Slaviša Jokanović	22	0	7+12	0	0	0	2	0	1	0
11	MF	(England) ENG	Dennis Wise	41	3	35+1	3	1	0	3	0	1	0
12	MF	(Croatia) CRO	Mario Stanić	14	2	8+4	2	0	0	2	0	0	0
14	DF	(England) ENG	Graeme Le Saux	24	0	17+3	0	2	0	2	0	0	0
15	DF	(Netherlands) NED	Mario Melchiot	34	1	27+4	0	1	1	1	0	1	0
16	MF	(Italy) ITA	Roberto Di Matteo	10	0	8	0	2	0	0	0	0	0
17	DF	(Spain) ESP	Albert Ferrer	17	0	12+2	0	0	0	3	0	0	0
19	FW	(Norway) NOR	Tore André Flo	17	3	5+9	3	2	0	0	0	1	0
20	MF	(England) ENG	Jody Morris	26	0	12+9	0	3	0	1	0	1	0
21	DF	(France) FRA	Bernard Lambourde	1	0	0+1	0	0	0	0	0	0	0
22	FW	(Iceland) ISL	Eiður Guðjohnsen	37	13	17+13	10	3	0	3	3	1	0
23	GK	(Italy) ITA	Carlo Cudicini	29	0	23+1	0	2	0	3	0	0	0
24	MF	(Italy) ITA	Samuele Dalla Bona	32	2	26+3	2	2	0	1	0	0	0
25	FW	(Italy) ITA	Gianfranco Zola	42	12	31+5	9	2	0	3	2	1	1
26	DF	(England) ENG	John Terry	26	1	19+3	1	0	0	3	0	1	0
27	MF	(Georgia (country)) GEO	Rati Aleksidze	3	0	0+2	0	1	0	0	0	0	0
30	MF	(Denmark) DEN	Jesper Grønkjær	16	3	6+8	1	0	0	2	2	0	0
34	DF	(England) ENG	Jon Harley	12	0	6+4	0	0	0	2	0	0	0

Statistics taken from. Squad details and shirt numbers from and .
