= Mauro (footballer, born 1984) =

Portuguese footballer

Personal information
- Full name: Mauro Oscar Coelho da Silva
- Date of birth: 2 February 1984 (age 42)
- Place of birth: Penafiel, Portugal
- Height: 2.03 m (6 ft 8 in)
- Position: Defender

Youth career
- –2002: Porto
- 2002–2003: Chelsea

Senior career*
Years	Team	Apps	(Gls)
2003–2004	Penafiel	5	(0)
2004–2005	Paredes	19	(1)
2005–2006	Marco	15	(0)
2006–2008	Esmoriz	31	(0)
Total		70	(1)

International career
2000–2001	Portugal U16	2	(0)
- * Club domestic league appearances and goals

Mauro Oscar Coelho da Silva (born 2 February 1984), commonly known as Mauro, is a Portuguese former professional footballer.

== Career statistics ==
=== Club ===
Club	Season	League			National Cup		League Cup		Other		Total	
Club	Season	Division	Apps	Goals	Apps	Goals	Apps	Goals	Apps	Goals	Apps	Goals
Penafiel	2003–04	Segunda Liga	5	0	1 (Note: Appearances in the Taça de Portugal)	0	0	0	0	0	6	0
Paredes	2004–05	Segunda Divisão B	19	1	0	0	–		0	0	19	1
Marco	2005–06	Liga de Honra	15	0	1	0	0	0	0	0	16	0
Esmoriz	2006–07	Segunda Divisão	12	0	0	0	–		0	0	12	0
Esmoriz	2007–08	Segunda Divisão	19	0	2	0	–		0	0	21	0
Esmoriz	Total		31	0	2	0	0	0	0	0	33	0
Career total			70	1	4	0	0	0	0	0	74	1
