= Jean-Yves Anis =

Ivorian footballer (born 1980)

Personal information
- Full name: Jean-Yves Jamaal Nino Anis
- Date of birth: 30 November 1980 (age 45)
- Place of birth: Oumé, Ivory Coast
- Height: 1.79 m (5 ft 10 1/2 in)
- Position: Defender

Senior career*
Years	Team	Apps	(Gls)
1998–2001	Rennes (B team)		
2002–2003	Chelsea	0	(3)
2003–2005	Partick Thistle	40	(2)
2005–2006	Ayr United	3	(4)
2006–2007	Clydebank	9	(5)
Total		52	(14)
- * Club domestic league appearances and goals

Jean-Yves Jamaal Nino Anis (born 30 November 1980) is an Ivorian former professional footballer who previously played for Partick Thistle. He also holds French nationality and played for France team at under-18 level.

He began his career as a youth at Stade Rennais, before moving to English giants Chelsea in 2002. After a brief spell at Chelsea, Anis moved to Scottish Premier League side Partick Thistle in 2003, under the management of Gerry Collins.

After two seasons with the Maryhill side, Anis had brief spells at Ayr United and Clydebank, after which he became unattached.
