= EMST =

EMST may refer to:

- Euclidean minimum spanning tree, a type of subgraph used in graph theory
- Early Management of Severe Trauma, an alternative name for Advanced Trauma Life Support commonly used outside North America
- National Museum of Contemporary Art, Athens
- The Dutch town of Emst
