= Marc Overmars =

Dutch football player and executive

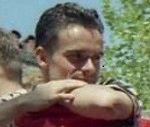
- Overmars in 1998

Personal information
- Full name: Marc Overmars
- Date of birth: 29 March 1973 (age 53)
- Place of birth: Emst, Netherlands
- Height: 1.73 m (5 ft 8 in)
- Position: Winger

Youth career
- 1978–1987: SV Epe
- 1987–1990: Go Ahead Eagles

Senior career*
| Years | Team | Apps | (Gls) |
| 1990–1991 | Go Ahead Eagles | 11 | (1) |
| 1991–1992 | Willem II | 31 | (1) |
| 1992–1997 | Ajax | 136 | (36) |
| 1997–2000 | Arsenal | 100 | (25) |
| 2000–2004 | Barcelona | 97 | (15) |
| 2008–2009 | Go Ahead Eagles | 24 | (0) |
| Total | | 399 | (78) |

International career
| 1993–2004 | Netherlands | 86 | (17) |
- * Club domestic league appearances and goals

Marc Overmars (Dutch pronunciation: [ˈmɑr(ə)k ˈoːvərmɑrs]; born 29 March 1973) is a Dutch former professional footballer and former director of football at Belgian Pro League side Royal Antwerp. He was previously director of football at Ajax. During his football career, he played as a winger and was renowned for his speed and technical skills.

Overmars was born in Emst and was passionate about football from an early age. He began his playing career at SV Epe before joining Go Ahead Eagles' youth team in 1987. He secured a place in the first team by the 1990–91 season, but joined Willem II in time for the following season. His stay at the club was short; after 31 appearances he signed for Ajax in 1992. He established himself as an important member of the team that won three Eredivisie titles from 1994 and 1996 and the UEFA Champions League in 1995. In December 1995, Overmars sustained a cruciate ligament injury which ruled him out of playing for eight months.

In 1997, he joined Arsenal; his performances at the club were indifferent to begin with and attracted criticism from football pundits and fans. By the end of his first season, Overmars became a focal point of Arsenal's league and cup double success. He scored the winning goal against league rivals Manchester United, which set his team on their way to securing the Premier League title, and opened the scoring against Newcastle United in the 1998 FA Cup final. In 2000, he moved to Barcelona in a deal worth £25 million and became the most expensive player in Dutch football history. The club failed to win silverware during his stay and numerous managerial changes made him a peripheral player. A persistent knee injury prompted Overmars to announce his retirement in 2004, but he reversed his decision in 2008 and went on to play one season for Go Ahead Eagles before retiring again.

In 2012, Overmars was named as Ajax's director of football. In February 2022, he left the role after a "series of inappropriate messages to several female colleagues", according to a formal statement by the club. Among other things, he had sent dick pics to at least one employee. In March 2022, he was presented as director of football by Royal Antwerp, causing the withdrawal of four sponsors of the club the same week.

Overmars represented the Netherlands national team for eleven years. He scored on his international debut in 1993 against Turkey, and was a member of the Dutch squad for four major tournaments: the 1994 and 1998 FIFA World Cups, and 2000 and 2004 European Championships.

== Early life ==
Overmars was born in Emst, Gelderland, growing up on a family farm with his parents and assisting his grandfather with the potato harvest each year. There were no machines or tractors, so when the time came to extract the potatoes, his family tied a rope around Overmars' waist, connected it to a cart and made him run while they pulled the crop out.

His father Ben described him as a "clumsy" child, whose main interest was playing football: "He used to come down 24 stairs to breakfast bouncing a ball on his head." This had an effect on his schoolwork; Overmars was uninterested in school, but did pass "a couple of GCEs". Ben did not know whether he made the effort to take his exams just to please him. As a teenager, Overmars did weight-training which improved his speed. He also attributed his pace to his mother who was quick, but "had no time for sports".

== Club career ==
=== Early career ===
Overmars began his playing career at local club SV Epe. In 1987, he joined Go Ahead Eagles at the age of 14. After making his breakthrough into the first team, he joined Willem II for ƒ500,000.

=== Ajax ===
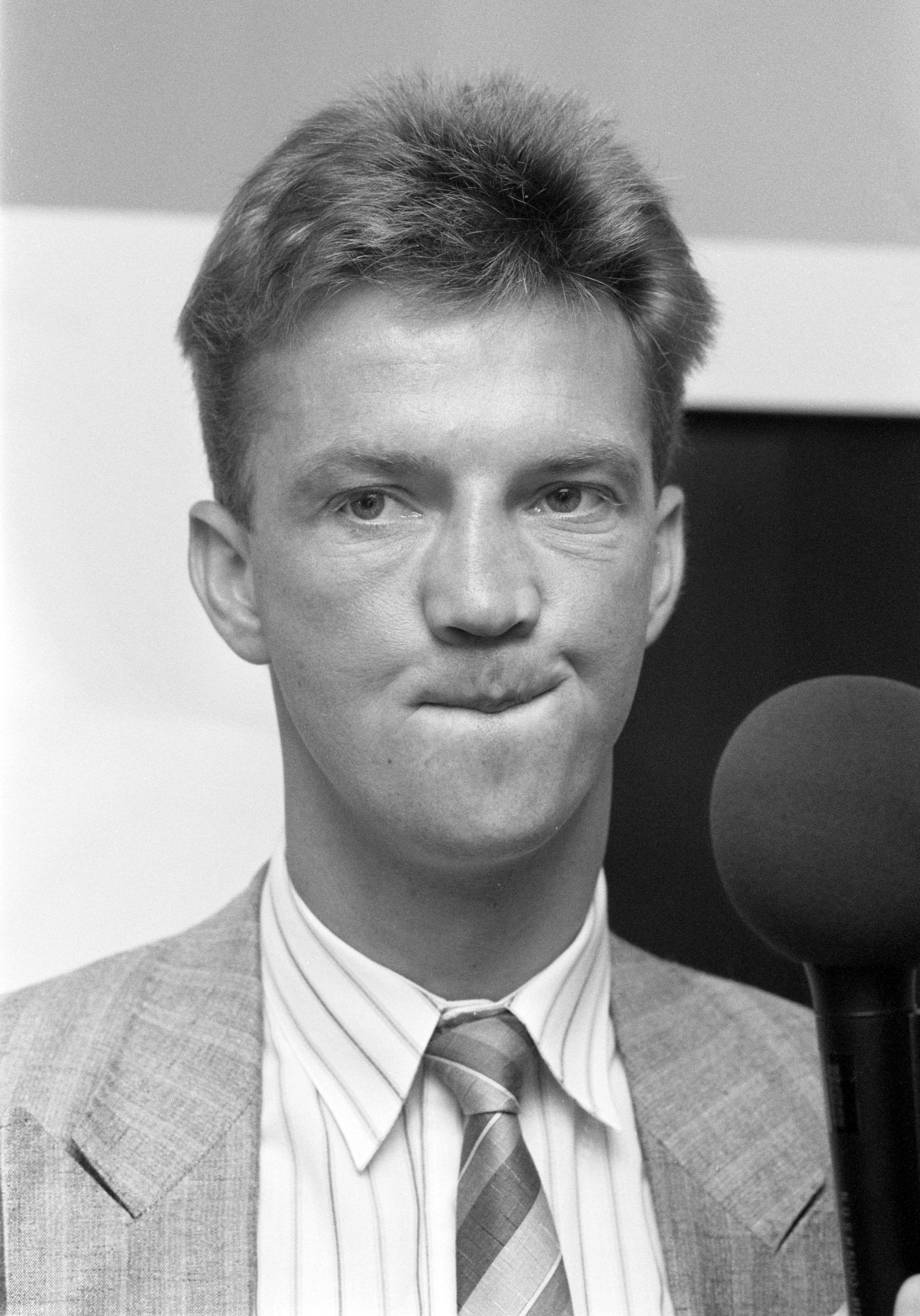
Louis van Gaal, the manager of Ajax who signed Overmars

After one season at Willem II, Overmars signed for Ajax in July 1992. Both clubs settled on a transfer fee of ƒ2.5 million, after Ajax's initial bid of ƒ1.5 million was rejected. Manager Louis van Gaal was very fond of Overmars beforehand and described him as a "multi-functional player". Overmars' debut came in a 3–0 win against Dordrecht on 16 August 1992. His first goal for Ajax was away to RKC Waalwijk in October and he scored a further seven goals in the 1992–93 season. Several teams chose to combat Overmars' threat with heavy tackles; he detested this, adding: "I do not fall on purpose, but if they keep kicking, I would sometimes give something back in return." Ajax finished the campaign third in the league; their form in the final few months was described as "maddening" by football writer David Winner, as they defeated eventual champions Feyenoord by five goals, but dropped points to "minnows like MVV Maastricht". The team lost to Auxerre in the quarter-finals of the UEFA Cup, but did not end the season trophyless – they beat Heerenveen 6–2 to win the KNVB Cup. Overmars scored two goals in the final.

Ajax began the 1993–94 season with a 4–0 defeat of Feyenoord to lift the Dutch Supercup; Overmars scored the team's fourth goal. In August 1993, he was awarded the Dutch Golden Shoe, as voted for by Dutch journalists. Overmars was happy with how his career progressed and said it was a "dream" to play for Ajax. Although he featured in 42 matches – five fewer matches than in the previous season – his goal count was much improved: he scored 12 goals in total, all of which came in the Eredivisie. His goals helped Ajax win the league; the team ended the campaign 25 points clear of second place Feyenoord.

Overmars enjoyed further success in the 1994–95 season. Ajax retained the league and won the UEFA Champions League, beating Milan in the final. He scored against Bayern Munich at the semi-final stage of the latter competition. In later years, Overmars criticised the expansion of the Champions League to include non league champions: "When I won it with Ajax it was only the teams who finished first who took part. It's not special any more. I think the Champions' League is just a starter for what they want to do in the future, create a European League." Overmars's exposure to European football had prompted him to be a sought-after player in England. He knew of Arsenal's interest, but was puzzled as to why a move "didn't work out." In the summer of 1995 he was linked with a move to Manchester United, but said: "No thanks I want to stay with Ajax for two more seasons."

In December 1995, Overmars injured himself during Ajax's match against De Graafschap. Close examination showed the player had torn ligaments on his left knee, which was "completely severed". He therefore missed the remainder of the 1995–96 season and advised Ajax to purchase a new striker to make up their loss. The club however signed left winger Peter Hoekstra in January 1996. Ajax played a second consecutive Champions League final in May 1996, but lost to Juventus by a penalty shoot-out. They did however retain the league for a third season.

The introduction of the Bosman ruling in 1995 had negative consequences for Ajax in the 1996–97 season. The club lost several players, and reinvested poorly according to Winner. Injuries also affected their challenge for honours; many players were exhausted as a result of UEFA Euro 1996 and the short summer break that came with it. Chairman Michael van Praag was determined to keep the club's players and said that Overmars had signed a four-year contract in 1996. He added, "We are not going to allow them to break their contracts so they are not leaving." On the pitch, Overmars made his return from injury against AZ on 28 August 1996. He had his least productive season for Ajax, scoring two goals. The club finished the season in fourth position.

=== Arsenal ===
Overmars signed for Arsenal in June 1997. The fee was reported to be between £5 million and £7 million, (Note: Although Wenger insisted Overmars' transfer to Arsenal cost the club £5 million, the figure is reputed to have been more. The Times for instance cited £7 million at the time of his signing.) with the player on a five-year contract, paid £18,000 per week. Overmars relished the challenge of playing in England: "I like English football because there is more pace. With my speed and quality I think it will be good for me here." Arsenal manager Arsène Wenger believed Overmars had his "best years ahead of him" and met his criteria of a player "used to the pressures of playing for a big club and everything that goes with it". He opined that Arsenal lost the Premier League at home the previous season – "we were maybe the best away team," and commented on their inability to play expansive football. Wenger felt the signing of Overmars would rectify that problem.

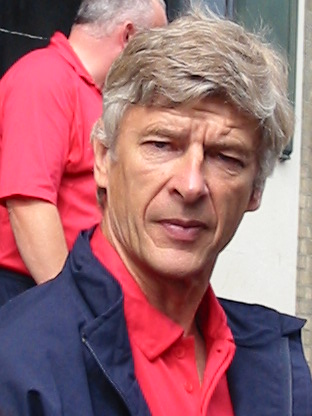
Arsène Wenger defended Overmars from criticism early into his Arsenal career.

Overmars made his competitive debut for Arsenal against Leeds United in a 1–1 draw on 9 August 1997. Two weeks later, he scored his first goal for the club, away to Southampton. Arsenal went to the top of the league table on goal difference in September 1997, after a 4–0 win against West Ham United. Overmars, who scored two goals in the match, had now "run into devastating form" according to Brian Glanville. His impact however waned in the subsequent months and so did Arsenal's form; a 3–1 defeat to Blackburn Rovers on 13 December 1997 meant the club dropped to fifth place. The turn of the year saw improvement to Overmars' game, which coincided with "the more general rejuvenation of the whole team". He scored both of Arsenal's goals in their win over Leeds United on 11 January 1998. Overmars up until this point was subject to criticism from commentators and fans. Wenger emphasised that this was his first year in England and there was more to come from him. He said Overmars was a "positive buy" and pointed out that his goalscoring record was "not bad for a winger".

Arsenal caught up with league leaders Manchester United by the time both clubs played each other at Old Trafford in March 1998. Overmars was a constant threat in the match and scored in the 80th minute. He received the ball from Nicolas Anelka and ran with it, before managing to flick it beyond the goalkeeper, Peter Schmeichel. Arsenal went on to win, which put them six points behind Manchester United, with three games in hand. Overmars afterwards said, "This was a great result for us. But you don't win the Premier League against Manchester United; you have to beat the other clubs." Arsenal overtook Manchester United in April 1998, and won the league after beating Everton on 3 May 1998; Overmars scored two goals in the match. The team later faced Newcastle United in the 1998 FA Cup Final and it was Overmars who scored the opening goal, in the 23rd minute. Anelka's goal in the second half ensured victory and completed a league and cup double for Arsenal. Wenger praised Overmars after the final:

All Europe thought Overmars was dead because of his damaged knee, but in every important game we have had this season, he has scored. He has got great mental strength. He is a world-class player.

Overmars began the 1998–99 season for Arsenal in good form; scoring the opening goal in a 3–0 win against Manchester United, thus being named as the man of the match of the 1998 FA Charity Shield. He also found himself on the scoresheet at home to Nottingham Forest in the opening game of the league campaign. Arsenal participated in the Champions League, but their time in the competition was brief. The team did not make it past the group stage, and in the decisive game against Dynamo Kyiv which they lost, Overmars was ruled out with an abdominal injury. In February 1999, he scored a "controversial" winning goal against Sheffield United in the FA Cup fifth round. Nwankwo Kanu failed to return the ball to the opposition, in order to allow one of their players to receive treatment for an injury. Due to the controversial circumstances in which the game was won, Wenger immediately offered a replay. His proposal was accepted by The Football Association (FA) and Arsenal went on to win the replayed match 2–1, where the opening goal was scored by Overmars. Arsenal exited the competition in the semi-final stage against Manchester United, who went on to win the league.

In November 1999, Overmars scored his first hat-trick for Arsenal, at home to Middlesbrough. His performance was lauded by journalist Lynne Truss, who wrote in The Times: "Overmars was in top Jack Russell form, bounding after the ball and prepared to savage anybody who tried to take it away from him." He twisted his ankle in action for Arsenal against Sheffield Wednesday in January 2000 and was out of action for six weeks. Unlike the previous two seasons, Arsenal never did pose a serious threat to Manchester United, who went on to retain the league in 1999–2000. Overmars had suggested before the campaign that Arsenal were as strong as their rivals, "especially in attack where we now have so many more options". Arsenal ended the league season strongly, winning eight games in a row between March and May to move from fifth to second place. In April 2000, Overmars scored the winning goal against Everton and was the standout performer in the game. His final game for Arsenal was the 2000 UEFA Cup Final against Galatasaray, which they lost 4–1 on penalties after a goalless draw.

In 2008, Overmars was voted as the 12th-greatest player in Arsenal's history by the club's supporters.

=== Barcelona ===
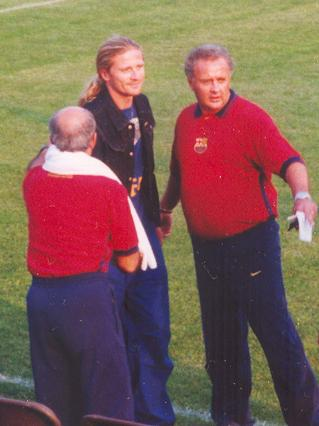
Emmanuel Petit joined Overmars at Barcelona in 2000.

After the Netherlands' exit at Euro 2000, Lazio and Barcelona were reportedly interested in signing Overmars; the latter club hastened their efforts once Joan Gaspart was elected as president. Overmars was "flattered" by Barcelona's interest and said moving to such a club would "excite any player". Gaspart travelled to London to open negotiations with Arsenal and eventually reached an agreement to sign Overmars and his teammate Emmanuel Petit for a combined fee of around £32 million in July 2000. Overmars cost £25 million, making him the most expensive player in Dutch football history. The announcement of his transfer was unconventional; he publicised it on his personal website before informing the media. His site garnered 250,000 hits in one day, highlighting the internet's "potential for exponential growth" in regards to football. Overmars was delighted with the move, saying, "I can't wait to pull on the famous shirt and play my first game."

Overmars made his debut for Barcelona against Arsenal in the Amsterdam Tournament in August 2000. He lasted 45 minutes and was substituted after sustaining an ankle injury. His first competitive start came at home to Málaga on 8 September 2000. His performance in the match started off well, then faded before coming back in the second half, opined Andrés Astruells in El Mundo Deportivo. He scored his first goal for the club at home to Racing Santander on 23 September 2000; it involved him dribbling the ball around the goalkeeper. Barcelona made an indifferent start to the 2000–01 season and by February 2001, journalist Sid Lowe commented it looked improbable that Lorenzo Serra Ferrer would remain as manager of the club. Wenger was touted as his replacement after reportedly meeting with Gaspart. Overmars believed his former manager was going to leave Arsenal and revealed that, "Barcelona have asked for lots of information about Wenger. I think something could happen soon." In La Liga, Overmars scored the team's seventh goal in their 7–0 win against Athletic Bilbao in February 2001; his performance was rated four stars out of five by El Mundo Deportivo.

Barcelona exited the semi-final stage of the UEFA Cup to Liverpool in April 2001. Serra Ferrer was sacked a week later and replaced by Carles Rexach. As the season drew to a close, Overmars turned into an influential player for Barcelona. Lowe labelled him as "Barça's only decent player in recent weeks" and was surprised he started on the bench against Real Valladolid in June 2001. When Overmars came on, he scored the equaliser to earn Barcelona a 2–2 draw. The team ended the campaign in fourth place after a dramatic 3–2 win against Valencia.

In the 2001–02 season, Barcelona once more finished fourth in the league. Petit left the club to join Chelsea before the season commenced, as he had found his first team opportunities limited. While on international duty with the Netherlands in September 2001, Overmars suffered a bruised knee and as a result did not play for Barcelona for a month. In November 2001, he scored Barcelona's third goal against Liverpool in the Champions League, which came after 29 uninterrupted passes. It was described by the Daily Mirror as "arguably the greatest team goal ever scored". Compared to the previous season, Overmars was used more sparingly in matches. Rexach had changed the team's formation to accommodate new signing Javier Saviola and promoted Xavi as a first-team regular. Overmars made an impact as a substitute against Galatasaray in December 2001; he set up Saviola twice to earn Barcelona a 2–2 draw. Mircea Lucescu, the manager of Galatasaray, complimented Overmars afterwards: "When we were 2–0 up I told my players at half-time to maintain the result, but Overmars is a great player. We did not have a solution to him and it threw our game off balance."

Overmars was subject to transfer speculation in early 2002 because of his limited role in the first team, but he revealed he was happy to stay at Barcelona: "My priority now is that the team wins. Personal issues are not important. I'm here for whatever you need me." In the Champions League, he started in the semi-final first leg against Real Madrid; the team lost 2–0 and were defeated 3–1 on aggregate. In May 2002, Rexach was dismissed and replaced by Louis van Gaal, who was managing the club for a second time. Overmars was wary of the appointment beforehand, saying, "Van Gaal is a good manager, but I do not know if his return would be good for Barcelona." He underwent surgery on his right knee at the end of the season and was out of action for six months.

The 2002–03 season saw Barcelona make their worst ever start to a league season; the club was two points off a relegation spot after defeat to Sevilla in December 2002. Van Gaal departed the club in January 2003 and following a board meeting, Gaspart resigned as president a month later. Radomir Antić presided as manager for the remainder of the season. He encouraged the team to play with more width and made minimal changes; for instance, he switched Overmars from a left winger to a right one. Overmars tore a muscle in his thigh during a Copa del Rey match against Terrassa in May 2003 and was sidelined for a month. In his final season for Barcelona, the club appointed Frank Rijkaard as manager and elected Joan Laporta as president. The club finished second in La Liga and were knocked out of the UEFA Cup by Celtic in the fourth round. Overmars made 29 appearances in the first team, three fewer than in the previous campaign. He was prolific in the Copa del Rey, a competition he scored twice in three matches. His performance against Ciudad de Murcia earned him recognition in El Mundo Deportivo, who wrote "frequent injuries have prevented him from consolidating his [position] as indisputable". Due to a persistent knee injury, he announced his retirement from football in July 2004 and left Barcelona without compensation.

=== Go Ahead Eagles ===
In July 2008, Overmars played in Jaap Stam's testimonial match in a team of "former Stam-mates" against Ajax. His performance, which saw him trouble defender George Ogăraru, earned him invitations from Dutch and German clubs to make his professional comeback. He declined the offers at first, but in August 2008 announced he was to come out of retirement to play again for Go Ahead Eagles. Overmars' comeback lasted only one season as his knee continued to give him discomfort.

== International career ==
Overmars' first call-up to the Netherlands senior national squad came in February 1993 for a 1994 World Cup qualifier against Turkey. He scored five minutes into his debut, after good play from Wim Jonk. The team went on to win 3–1 and Overmars said the goal was good for his confidence. Dick Advocaat, the manager of the Netherlands, was complimentary of the debutant's performance. In April 1993, Overmars earned the national team a penalty against England after Des Walker fouled him. Peter van Vossen converted the spot kick to complete a comeback for the Netherlands, who had been 2–0 down after 24 minutes.

The national team qualified for the 1994 FIFA World Cup in November 1993. Advocaat selected Overmars for the tournament and he featured in all of the Netherlands' five matches. Against the Republic of Ireland in the round of 16, he took advantage of Terry Phelan's header intended for goalkeeper Packie Bonner and sprinted away to set up Dennis Bergkamp to score. The Netherlands were eliminated in the quarter-finals against Brazil; Advocaat deployed Overmars as an extra attacker, but for much of the match he played as one of five in midfield. His corner in the 76th minute was met by Aron Winter and levelled the scores at 2–2 for a brief period – a goal from Branco resolved the match in favour of Brazil. Overmars' performances in the competition led him to be named the best young player of the 1994 World Cup.

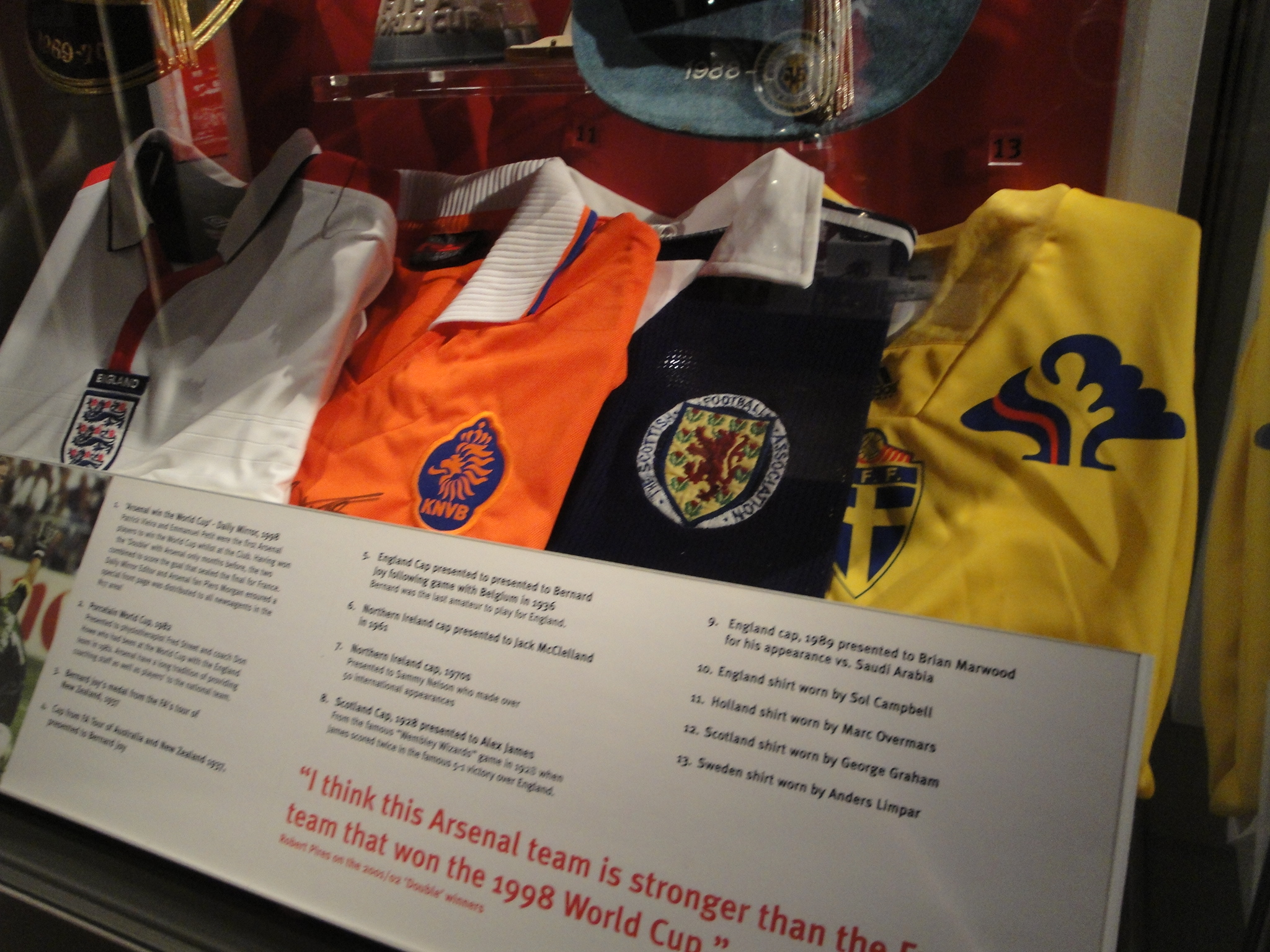
Overmars' Netherlands shirt, second from left on display

In October 1995, he scored a hat-trick for the Netherlands in their Euro 1996 qualifier away to Malta. He was pleased with his performance – "things are getting better," and felt he needed to practise his shooting and inward running technique. Overmars did not participate in the tournament finals as he was recuperating from his knee ligament injury. Sports writer Rob Hughes said the Netherlands draw against Scotland showed why "they sorely miss the speed and balance of Marc Overmars". The player returned to international action for the 1998 World Cup qualifier against Wales in November 1996. He believed his best position for the national team was up front, but manager Guus Hiddink wanted him to remain as a winger.

Overmars was selected in the squad for the 1998 World Cup, staged in France. Before the tournament began, he scored two goals in a friendly against Paraguay. He was on the scoresheet in the national team's 5–0 win against South Korea in the group stage. While training before the quarter-final match against Argentina, he sustained an injury which seemingly ruled him out of contention. He did feature late into the game as a substitute, but aggravated his injury. He was subsequently forced to sit out the entire semi-final against Brazil, which the Netherlands lost on penalties.

Overmars suffered a minor setback prior to Euro 2000 with a sore thigh muscle. However, he resumed training and was declared fit for the Netherlands opening match against Czech Republic, where he started on the bench. His introduction brought about the only goal of the match – a penalty scored the 89th minute. Ronald de Boer was adjudged to have had his shirt pulled whilst jumping to meet Overmars' cross. In the quarter-finals, he scored twice in the team's 6–1 win against Yugoslavia. The Netherlands went on to lose their semi-final to Italy on penalties. Overmars played in eight of the national team's ten 2002 World Cup qualifiers, but it was an unsuccessful campaign as they failed to qualify for the finals.

After a year's absence from international football due to injury, Overmars was recalled to the Netherlands squad for their friendly against Portugal in April 2003. Two months later, he came on as a substitute against Belarus in a Euro 2004 qualifier and scored the opening goal of the game. He was selected for the tournament held in Portugal, and was advised by Advocaat not to train more than once a day, so that his body would resist burn out. Overmars only started three matches in Euro 2004, his final game was the Netherlands loss to Portugal in the semi-final. In all, he played in 86 games for his national side, scoring 17 goals.

== Style of play ==
He was a good dribbler who could beat people one-on-one and that was important for a winger in our system. But he also had a very good assist record and he could score goals.

— Louis van Gaal on Overmars, June 2004

A diminutive footballer, Overmars in his prime was described as "the archetypal winger", whose speed, vision, two-footedness and dribbling ability meant he was able to get the better of most defenders and either score or assist goals. Indeed, pace and acceleration was an important part of his game and reflective of his nicknames "TGV" and "Roadrunner". Former teammate Emmanuel Petit said his strength lay "... in pushing the ball beyond his marker and darting past him into space to deliver crosses". Former defender Gary Neville opined that Overmars was the best winger he came up against in his time at Manchester United, not least because of his versatility, which was exemplified by Overmars's ability to play on both the left and the right wing, despite being naturally right footed.

Football pundit Alan Hansen believed Overmars benefited from a "strange feature of the modern English game" – defenders backing off and allowing him to run until he was in a shooting position. Despite his talent, Overmars was also known to be injury-prone throughout his career.

== Post-football career ==
In February 2005, Overmars became a shareholder of Go Ahead Eagles. Two months later, he joined the club's supervisory board to deal with technical matters. Hans de Vroome, chairman of Go Ahead Eagles, said he was "more than satisfied" with Overmars' arrival, adding: "The board needs someone with a solid football background."

In 2011, Overmars took up a position as youth coach of Ajax for one day per week. At the end of the 2011–12 season, Overmars left his post at Go Ahead Eagles. He said: "I have been active on a voluntary basis at the club for seven years. That's a big time in my life." The club's disappointing league form "accelerated" his decision.

Overmars became director of football at Ajax in July 2012. He resigned from his position at Ajax on 6 February 2022 after admitting to sending a series of inappropriate messages to female colleagues. Among other things, he had sent photos of his genitals to at least one employee.

On 21 March 2022, he was presented as Director of Football by Royal Antwerp, causing the withdrawal of four sponsors of the club in the same week.

On 10 January 2024, Overmars was banned for one year by FIFA from world football for his inappropriate behaviour.

An independent sports tribunal banned Overmars from any position in Dutch football for two years over the incidents, with one year suspended. The KNVB then asked Fifa to turn the domestic suspension into a global one. “We have a duty to report this sanction to Fifa’s disciplinary committee ... which has decided to take over the suspension as of 16 November 2023,” the KNVB said.

== Personal life ==
Overmars married his long-term partner Chantal van Woensel in May 2013. Prior to the wedding, the couple had two sons, Frenkie and Nick, both of whom are footballers. He is a co-owner of a restaurant in Epe, in the province of Gelderland, where he resides. The family business, Overmars Vastgoed bv, was founded in the 1990s and continues to invest in, amongst other things, commercial and residential buildings. With his father Ben and brother Edwin, he also runs a car restoration service named Overmars Classic Cars. In 2002, Overmars appeared in the Quote 500 richest Dutch people list for the first time, at number 441.

In December 2022, Overmars was admitted to hospital after suffering a "mild stroke". In reality, it was later revealed that he had suffered a cardiac arrest, and will need a year to recover as his heart presently is only able to pump blood at 30% efficiency.

== Career statistics ==
=== Club ===
Appearances and goals by club, season and competition
| Club | Season | League | | | National cup | | League cup | | Europe | | Other | | Total | |
| Club | Season | Division | Apps | Goals | Apps | Goals | Apps | Goals | Apps | Goals | Apps | Goals | Apps | Goals |
|---|---|---|---|---|---|---|---|---|---|---|---|---|---|---|
| Go Ahead Eagles | 1990–91 | Eerste Divisie | 11 | 1 | | | – | | – | | | | 11 | 1 |
| Willem II | 1991–92 | Eredivisie | 31 | 1 | 0 | 0 | – | | – | | – | | 31 | 1 |
| Ajax | 1992–93 | Eredivisie | 34 | 3 | 5 | 4 | – | | 8 | 1 | – | | 47 | 8 |
| Ajax | 1993–94 | Eredivisie | 34 | 12 | 4 | 0 | – | | 5 | 0 | 1 (Note: Appearance in Dutch Super Cup) | 1 | 44 | 13 |
| Ajax | 1994–95 | Eredivisie | 28 | 8 | 3 | 0 | – | | 11 | 1 | 1 | 0 | 43 | 9 |
| Ajax | 1995–96 | Eredivisie | 15 | 11 | 0 | 0 | – | | 6 | 2 | 2 (Note: One appearance in Intercontinental Cup (football); one appearance in Dutch Super Cup) | 0 | 23 | 13 |
| Ajax | 1996–97 | Eredivisie | 25 | 2 | 1 | 0 | – | | 10 | 0 | 0 | 0 | 36 | 2 |
| Ajax | Total | | 136 | 36 | 13 | 4 | 0 | 0 | 40 | 4 | 4 | 1 | 193 | 45 |
| Arsenal | 1997–98 | Premier League | 32 | 12 | 9 | 2 | 3 | 2 | 2 | 0 | – | | 46 | 16 |
| Arsenal | 1998–99 | Premier League | 37 | 6 | 7 | 4 | 0 | 0 | 4 | 1 | 1 (Note: Appearance in FA Charity Shield) | 1 | 49 | 12 |
| Arsenal | 1999–2000 | Premier League | 31 | 7 | 1 | 1 | 1 | 0 | 14 | 5 | – | | 47 | 13 |
| Arsenal | Total | | 100 | 25 | 17 | 7 | 4 | 2 | 20 | 6 | 1 | 1 | 142 | 41 |
| Barcelona | 2000–01 | La Liga | 31 | 8 | 5 | 0 | – | | 10 | 0 | – | | 46 | 8 |
| Barcelona | 2001–02 | La Liga | 20 | 0 | 1 | 0 | – | | 11 | 1 | – | | 32 | 1 |
| Barcelona | 2002–03 | La Liga | 26 | 6 | 0 | 0 | – | | 6 | 1 | – | | 32 | 7 |
| Barcelona | 2003–04 | La Liga | 20 | 1 | 3 | 2 | – | | 8 | 0 | – | | 31 | 3 |
| Barcelona | Total | | 97 | 15 | 9 | 2 | 0 | 0 | 35 | 2 | 0 | 0 | 141 | 19 |
| Go Ahead Eagles | 2008–09 | Eerste Divisie | 24 | 0 | 0 | 0 | – | | – | | – | | 24 | 0 |
| Career total | | | 399 | 78 | 38 | 12 | 5 | 2 | 95 | 12 | 5 | 2 | 542 | 106 |

=== International ===
Appearances and goals by national team and year
| National team | Year | Apps | Goals |
|---|---|---|---|
| Netherlands | 1993 | 7 | 1 |
| Netherlands | 1994 | 14 | 1 |
| Netherlands | 1995 | 8 | 4 |
| Netherlands | 1996 | 2 | 0 |
| Netherlands | 1997 | 4 | 0 |
| Netherlands | 1998 | 14 | 4 |
| Netherlands | 1999 | 3 | 0 |
| Netherlands | 2000 | 10 | 4 |
| Netherlands | 2001 | 8 | 1 |
| Netherlands | 2002 | 2 | 0 |
| Netherlands | 2003 | 8 | 1 |
| Netherlands | 2004 | 6 | 1 |
| Total | | 86 | 17 |

Scores and results list the Netherlands goal tally first, score column indicates score after each Overmars goal.

List of international goals scored by Marc Overmars
| No. | Date | Venue | Opponent | Score | Result | Competition | Ref. |
|---|---|---|---|---|---|---|---|
| 1 | 24 February 1993 | Stadion Galgenwaard, Utrecht, Netherlands | Turkey | 1–0 | 3–1 | 1994 FIFA World Cup qualification | |
| 2 | 12 June 1994 | Varsity Stadium, Toronto, Canada | Canada | 2–0 | 3–0 | Friendly | |
| 3 | 11 October 1995 | Ta'Qali Stadium, Ta'Qali, Malta | Malta | 1–0 | 4–0 | UEFA Euro 1996 qualifying | |
| 4 | 11 October 1995 | Ta'Qali Stadium, Ta'Qali, Malta | Malta | 2–0 | 4–0 | UEFA Euro 1996 qualifying | |
| 5 | 11 October 1995 | Ta'Qali Stadium, Ta'Qali, Malta | Malta | 3–0 | 4–0 | UEFA Euro 1996 qualifying | |
| 6 | 15 November 1995 | De Kuip, Rotterdam, Netherlands | Norway | 3–0 | 3–0 | UEFA Euro 1996 qualifying | |
| 7 | 1 June 1998 | Philips Stadion, Eindhoven, Netherlands | Paraguay | 1–1 | 5–1 | Friendly | |
| 8 | 1 June 1998 | Philips Stadion, Eindhoven, Netherlands | Paraguay | 2–1 | 5–1 | Friendly | |
| 9 | 5 June 1998 | Amsterdam Arena, Amsterdam, Netherlands | Nigeria | 2–0 | 5–1 | Friendly | |
| 10 | 20 June 1998 | Stade Vélodrome, Marseille, France | South Korea | 2–0 | 5–0 | 1998 FIFA World Cup | |
| 11 | 27 May 2000 | Amsterdam Arena, Amsterdam, Netherlands | Romania | 1–0 | 2–1 | Friendly | |
| 12 | 25 June 2000 | De Kuip, Rotterdam, Netherlands | FR Yugoslavia | 5–0 | 6–1 | UEFA Euro 2000 | |
| 13 | 25 June 2000 | De Kuip, Rotterdam, Netherlands | FR Yugoslavia | 6–0 | 6–1 | UEFA Euro 2000 | |
| 14 | 7 October 2000 | GSP Stadium, Nicosia, Cyprus | Cyprus | 3–0 | 4–0 | 2002 FIFA World Cup qualification | |
| 15 | 25 April 2001 | Philips Stadion, Eindhoven, Netherlands | Cyprus | 2–0 | 4–0 | 2002 FIFA World Cup qualification | |
| 16 | 7 June 2003 | Dinamo Stadium, Minsk, Belarus | Belarus | 1–0 | 2–0 | UEFA Euro 2004 qualifying | |
| 17 | 1 June 2004 | Stade Olympique de la Pontaise, Lausanne, Switzerland | Faroe Islands | 3–0 | 3–0 | Friendly | |

== Honours ==
Ajax

- Eredivisie: 1993–94, 1994–95, 1995–96
- KNVB Cup: 1992–93
- Dutch Supercup: 1993
- UEFA Champions League: 1994–95
- Intercontinental Cup: 1995

Arsenal

- Premier League: 1997–98
- FA Cup: 1997–98
- FA Charity Shield: 1998

Individual

- Dutch Football Talent of the Year: 1992
- Dutch Golden Shoe Winner:1993
- FIFA World Cup Best Young Player: 1994
- AFC Ajax Player of the Year: 1996

== See also ==
- List of athletes who came out of retirement
