= Netherlands national football team results (1980–1999) =

- Win Draw Loss

This is a list of football games played by the Netherlands national football team between 1980 and 1999.

== 1990 ==
21 February Friendly	Netherlands	0–0	Italy	Rotterdam, Netherlands
20:00 UTC+1		Report		Stadium: De Kuip; Attendance: 24,198; Referee: Gérard Biguet (France)

28 March Friendly	Soviet Union	2–1	Netherlands	Kyev, Soviet Union
19:00 UTC+2	Protasov 10' (pen.); Lyutyi 80'	Report	Koeman 70' (pen.)	Stadium: Olimpiyskiy National Sports Complex; Attendance: 60,000; Referee: Sándor Puhl (Hungary)

30 May Friendly	Austria	3–2	Netherlands	Vienna, Austria
19:30 UTC+2	Pecl 3'; Zsak 46'; Pfeffer 49'	Report	Koeman 60' van Basten 84'	Stadium: Praterstadion; Attendance: 48,000; Referee: Manfred Roßner (East Germany)

3 June Friendly	Yugoslavia	0–2	Netherlands	Zagreb, Yugoslavia
20:00 UTC+2		Report	Rijkaard 53' van Basten 83'	Stadium: Stadion Maksimir; Attendance: 20,000; Referee: Friedrich Kaupe (Austria)

12 June 1990 FIFA World Cup Group F	Netherlands	1–1	Egypt	Palermo, Italy
21:00 UTC+2	Kieft 58'	Report	Abdelghani 83' (pen.)	Stadium: Stadio La Favorita; Attendance: 33,288; Referee: Emilio Soriano Aladrén (Spain)

16 June 1990 FIFA World Cup Group F	England	0–0	Netherlands	Cagliari, Italy
21:00 UTC+2		Report		Stadium: Stadio Sant'Elia; Attendance: 35,267; Referee: Zoran Petrović (Yugoslavia)

21 June 1990 FIFA World Cup Group F	Republic of Ireland	1–1	Netherlands	Palermo, Italy
21:00 UTC+2	Quinn 71'	Report	Gullit 11'	Stadium: Stadio La Favorita; Attendance: 33,288; Referee: Michel Vautrot (France)

24 June 1990 FIFA World Cup Round of 16	West Germany	2–1	Netherlands	Milan, Italy
21:00 UTC+2	Klinsmann 51'; Brehme 85'	Report	Koeman 89' (pen.)	Stadium: San Siro; Attendance: 74,559; Referee: Juan Carlos Loustau (Argentina)

26 September Friendly	Italy	1–0	Netherlands	Palermo, Italy
20:30 UTC+2	Baggio 45'	Report		Stadium: Stadio La Favorita; Attendance: 36,000; Referee: Zoran Petrović (Yugoslavia)

17 October UEFA Euro 1992 qualifying	Portugal	1–0	Netherlands	Porto, Portugal
21:00 UTC+1	Águas 54'	Report		Stadium: Estádio das Antas; Attendance: 17,198; Referee: Siegfried Kirschen (Germany)

21 November UEFA Euro 1992 qualifying	Netherlands	2–0	Greece	Rotterdam, Netherlands
18:00 UTC+1	Bergkamp 7' van Basten 18'	Report		Stadium: De Kuip; Attendance: 20,233; Referee: Lajos Nemeth (Hungary)

19 December UEFA Euro 1992 qualifying	Malta	0–8	Netherlands	Ta' Qali, Malta
14:30 UTC+1		Report	van Basten 9', 20', 23', 64', 80' (pen.); Winter 53'; Bergkamp 60', 66'	Stadium: Ta' Qali Stadium; Attendance: 10,254; Referee: Rolf Blattmann (Switzerland)

== 1991 ==
13 March UEFA Euro 1992 qualifying	Netherlands	1–0	Malta	Rotterdam, Netherlands
20:00 UTC+1	van Basten 31' (pen.)	Report		Stadium: De Kuip; Attendance: 36,383; Referee: Dušan Krchnák (Czechoslovakia)

17 April UEFA Euro 1992 qualifying	Netherlands	2–0	Finland	Rotterdam, Netherlands
20:00 UTC+2	van Basten 9'; Gullit 76'	Report		Stadium: De Kuip; Attendance: 21,426; Referee: Jan Damgaard (Denmark)

5 June UEFA Euro 1992 qualifying	Finland	1–1	Netherlands	Helsinki, Finland
19:00 UTC+3	Holmgren 77'	Report	de Boer 60'	Stadium: Helsinki Olympic Stadium; Attendance: 21,207; Referee: Brian McGinlay (Scotland)

11 September Friendly	Netherlands	1–1	Poland	Eindhoven, Netherlands
20:00 UTC+2	Bergkamp 90'	Report	Ziober 87'	Stadium: Philips Stadion; Attendance: 15,000; Referee: Alphonse Costantin (Belgium)

16 October UEFA Euro 1992 qualifying	Netherlands	1–0	Portugal	Rotterdam, Netherlands
20:00 UTC+2	Witschge 20'	Report		Stadium: De Kuip; Attendance: 40,057; Referee: George Courtney (England)

4 December UEFA Euro 1992 qualifying	Greece	0–2	Netherlands	Thessaloniki, Greece
18:00 UTC+2		Report	Bergkamp 37'; Blind 87'	Stadium: Kaftanzoglio Stadium; Attendance: 25,053; Referee: Bo Karlsson (Sweden)

== 1992 ==
12 February Friendly	Portugal	2–0	Netherlands	Faro, Portugal
19:30 UTC+0	Oceano 3'; Brito 80'	Report		Stadium: Estádio de São Luís; Attendance: 3,825; Referee: Manuel Díaz Vega (Spain)

25 March Friendly	Netherlands	2–0	Yugoslavia	Amsterdam, Netherlands
20:00 UTC+1	Kieft 64'; Wouters 68'	Report		Stadium: De Meer Stadion; Attendance: 10,300; Referee: Serge Muhmenthaler (Switzerland)

27 May Friendly	Netherlands	3–2	Austria	Sittard, Netherlands
20:00 UTC+2	Rijkaard 24'; Bergkamp 30'; Gullit 85'	Report	Polster 32'; Schinkels 89'	Stadium: De Baandert; Attendance: 16,000; Referee: Rune Larsson (Sweden)

30 May Friendly	Netherlands	4–0	Wales	Utrecht, Netherlands
20:00 UTC+2	Roy 15' van Basten 36'; Winter 73'; Jonk 83'	Report		Stadium: Stadion Galgenwaard; Attendance: 18,009; Referee: Esa Palsi (Finland)

5 June Friendly	France	1–1	Netherlands	Lens, France
20:30 UTC+2	Papin 12'	Report	Roy 18'	Stadium: Stade Félix-Bollaert; Attendance: 40,000; Referee: Hans-Jürgen Weber (Germany)

12 June UEFA Euro 1992 Group 2	Netherlands	1–0	Scotland	Gothenburg, Sweden
17:15 UTC+2	Bergkamp 75'	Report		Stadium: Ullevi; Attendance: 35,720; Referee: Bo Karlsson (Sweden)

15 June UEFA Euro 1992 Group 2	Netherlands	0–0	CIS	Gothenburg, Sweden
20:15 UTC+2		Report		Stadium: Ullevi; Attendance: 34,440; Referee: Peter Mikkelsen (Denmark)

18 June UEFA Euro 1992 Group 2	Netherlands	3–1	Germany	Gothenburg, Sweden
20:15 UTC+2	Rijkaard 4'; Witschge 15'; Bergkamp 72'	Report	Klinsmann 53'	Stadium: Ullevi; Attendance: 37,725; Referee: Pierluigi Pairetto (Italy)

22 June UEFA Euro 1992 Semi-final	Netherlands	2–2 (a.e.t.) (4–5 p)	Denmark	Gothenburg, Sweden
20:15 UTC+2	Bergkamp 23'; Rijkaard 86'	Report	Larsen 5', 33'	Stadium: Ullevi; Attendance: 37,450; Referee: Emilio Soriano Aladrén (Spain)
	Penalties
	Koeman (penalty scored); Van Basten (penalty missed); Bergkamp (penalty scored); Rijkaard (penalty scored); Witschge (penalty scored)		(penalty scored) Larsen; (penalty scored) Povlsen; (penalty scored) Elstrup; (penalty scored) Vilfort; (penalty scored) Christofte

9 September Friendly	Netherlands	2–3	Italy	Eindhoven, Netherlands
20:00 UTC+2	Bergkamp 4', 21'	Report	Eranio 29'; Baggio 41' (pen.); Vialli 77'	Stadium: Philips Stadion; Attendance: 12,800; Referee: Markus Merk (Germany)

23 September 1994 FIFA World Cup qualification	Norway	2–1	Netherlands	Oslo, Norway
	Rekdal 9' (pen.); Sørloth 78'	Report	Bergkamp 10'	Stadium: Ullevaal Stadion; Attendance: 19,998; Referee: Rémi Harrel (France)

14 October 1994 FIFA World Cup qualification	Netherlands	2–2	Poland	Rotterdam, Netherlands
	Van Vossen 43', 48'	Report	Koźmiński 19'; Kowalczyk 21'	Stadium: De Kuip; Attendance: 14,500; Referee: Arcangelo Pezzella (Italy)

16 December 1994 FIFA World Cup qualification	Turkey	1–3	Netherlands	Istanbul, Turkey
	Feyyaz 61'	Report	Van Vossen 57', 87'; Gullit 59'	Stadium: BJK İnönü Stadium; Attendance: 7,585; Referee: Kurt Röthlisberger (Switzerland)

== 1993 ==
24 February 1994 FIFA World Cup qualification	Netherlands	3–1	Turkey	Utrecht, Netherlands
	Overmars 4'; Witschge 37', 57'	Report	Uçar 36' (pen.)	Stadium: Stadion Galgenwaard; Attendance: 13,000; Referee: Antonio Martin Navarrete (Spain)

24 March 1994 FIFA World Cup qualification	Netherlands	6–0	San Marino	Utrecht, Netherlands
	Van den Brom 2'; Canti 29' (o.g.) de Wolf 52', 85'; R. de Boer 68' (pen.); Van Vossen 78'	Report		Stadium: Stadion Galgenwaard; Attendance: 12,500; Referee: Gerd Grabher (Austria)

28 April 1994 FIFA World Cup qualification	England	2–2	Netherlands	London, England
	Barnes 2'; Platt 23'	Report	Bergkamp 34'; Van Vossen 85' (pen.)	Stadium: Wembley Stadium; Attendance: 73,163; Referee: Peter Mikkelsen (Denmark)

9 June 1994 FIFA World Cup qualification	Netherlands	0–0	Norway	Rotterdam, Netherlands
		Report		Stadium: De Kuip; Attendance: 42,600; Referee: Vassilios Nikakis (Greece)

22 September 1994 FIFA World Cup qualification	San Marino	0–7	Netherlands	Bologna, Italy
		Report	Bosman 1', 66', 76'; Jonk 21', 43'; R. de Boer 51'; R. Koeman 79' (pen.)	Stadium: Stadio Renato dall'Ara; Attendance: 3.340; Referee: Charles Agius (Malta)

13 October 1994 FIFA World Cup qualification	Netherlands	2–0	England	Rotterdam, Netherlands
	Koeman 62'; Bergkamp 68'	Report		Stadium: De Kuip; Attendance: 48.000; Referee: Karl-Josef Assenmacher (Germany)

17 November 1994 FIFA World Cup qualification	Poland	1–3	Netherlands	Poznań, Poland
	Leśniak 14'	Report	Bergkamp 10', 56'; R. de Boer 88'	Stadium: Stadion Miejski; Attendance: 17,000; Referee: Leif Sundell (Sweden)

== 1994 ==
19 January Friendly	Tunisia	2–2	Netherlands	Tunis, Tunisia
20:15 UTC+1	Rouissi 12'; Hamrouni 51'	Report	Rijkaard 31'; Koeman 59'	Stadium: Stade El Menzah; Attendance: 26,557; Referee: Yahya Hadqa (Morocco)

23 March Friendly	Scotland	0–1	Netherlands	Glasgow, Scotland
20:00 UTC+0		Report	Roy 21'	Stadium: Hampden Park; Attendance: 36,809; Referee: Kim Milton Nielsen (Denmark)

20 April Friendly	Netherlands	0–1	Republic of Ireland	Tilburg, Netherlands
20:15 UTC+2		Report	Coyne 59'	Stadium: Willem II Stadion; Attendance: 14,000; Referee: Hartmut Strampe (Germany)

27 May Friendly	Netherlands	3–1	Scotland	Utrecht, Netherlands
20:15 UTC+2	Roy 17'; Van Vossen 62'; Irvine 71' (o.g.)	Report	Shearer 82'	Stadium: Stadion Galgenwaard; Attendance: 17,500; Referee: Juan Ansuátegui Roca (Spain)

1 June Friendly	Netherlands	7–1	Hungary	Eindhoven, Netherlands
20:15 UTC+2	Bergkamp 13', 88'; Roy 18'; R. Koeman 19' (pen.); Taument 47'; Rijkaard 59', 79'	Report	Illes 8' (pen.)	Stadium: Philips Stadion; Attendance: 27,450; Referee: David Elleray (England)

12 June Friendly	Canada	0–3	Netherlands	Toronto, Canada
13:30 UTC-4		Report	Bergkamp 7'; Overmars 13'; Rijkaard 37'	Stadium: Varsity Stadium; Attendance: 20,144; Referee: Mike Reed (England)

20 June 1994 FIFA World Cup Group F	Netherlands	2–1	Saudi Arabia	Washington, United States
19:30 UTC-4	Jonk 50'; Taument 86'	Report	Amin 18'	Stadium: RFK Stadium; Attendance: 50,535; Referee: Manuel Díaz Vega (Spain)

25 June 1994 FIFA World Cup Group F	Belgium	1–0	Netherlands	Orlando, United States
12:30 UTC-4	Albert 65'	Report		Stadium: Citrus Bowl; Attendance: 62,387; Referee: Renato Marsiglia (Brazil)

29 June 1994 FIFA World Cup Group F	Morocco	1–2	Netherlands	Orlando, United States
12:30 UTC-4	Nader 47'	Report	Bergkamp 43'; Roy 77'	Stadium: Citrus Bowl; Attendance: 60,578; Referee: Alberto Tejada Noriega (Peru)

4 July 1994 FIFA World Cup Round of 16	Netherlands	2–0	Republic of Ireland	Orlando, United States
12:00 UTC-4	Bergkamp 11'; Jonk 41'	Report		Stadium: Citrus Bowl; Attendance: 61,355; Referee: Peter Mikkelsen (Denmark)

9 July 1994 FIFA World Cup Quarter-final	Netherlands	2–3	Brazil	Dallas, United States
14:30 UTC-5	Bergkamp 64'; Winter 76'	Report	Romário 53'; Bebeto 63'; Branco 81'	Stadium: Cotton Bowl; Attendance: 63,500; Referee: Rodrigo Badilla (Costa Rica)

7 September UEFA Euro 1996 qualifying	Luxembourg	0–4	Netherlands	Luxembourg City, Luxembourg
20:15 UTC+2		Report	Roy 23'; R. de Boer 65', 67'; Jonk 90'	Stadium: Stade Josy Barthel; Attendance: 8,120; Referee: Alan Snoddy (Northern Ireland)

12 October UEFA Euro 1996 qualifying	Norway	1–1	Netherlands	Oslo, Norway
19:45 UTC+1	Rekdal 52' (pen.)	Report	Roy 22'	Stadium: Ullevaal Stadion; Attendance: 22,293; Referee: Jim McCluskey (Scotland)

16 November UEFA Euro 1996 qualifying	Netherlands	0–0	Czech Republic	Rotterdam, Netherlands
20:15 UTC+1		Report		Stadium: De Kuip; Attendance: 41,155; Referee: Sándor Puhl (Hungary)

14 December UEFA Euro 1996 qualifying	Netherlands	5–0	Luxembourg	Rotterdam, Netherlands
20:15 UTC+1	Mulder 7'; Roy 17'; Jonk 40'; R. de Boer 52'; Seedorf 90'	Report		Stadium: De Kuip; Attendance: 26,000; Referee: Daniel Roduit (Switzerland)

== 1995 ==
17 January Friendly	Netherlands	0–1	France	Utrecht, Netherlands
20:15 UTC+1		Report	Loko 45'	Stadium: Galgenwaard Stadium; Attendance: 14,000; Referee: Michel Piraux (Belgium)

22 February Friendly	Netherlands	0–1	Portugal	Eindhoven, Netherlands
20:15 UTC+1		Report	Pedro Barbosa 8'	Stadium: Philips Stadion; Attendance: 25,300; Referee: Gilles Veissière (France)

29 March UEFA Euro 1996 qualifying	Netherlands	4–0	Malta	Rotterdam, Netherlands
20:15 UTC+2	Seedorf 38'; Bergkamp 77' (pen.); Winter 79'; Kluivert 84'	Report		Stadium: De Kuip; Attendance: 30,288; Referee: Gylfi Thór Orrason (Iceland)

26 April UEFA Euro 1996 qualifying	Czech Republic	3–1	Netherlands	Prague, Czech Republic
20:15 UTC+2	Skuhravý 49'; Nemecek 57'; Berger 62'	Report	Jonk 7'	Stadium: Letná Stadium; Attendance: 17,463; Referee: Hellmut Krug (Germany)

7 June UEFA Euro 1996 qualifying	Belarus	1–0	Netherlands	Minsk, Belarus
20:00 UTC+3	Gerasimets 27'	Report		Stadium: Dynamo Stadium; Attendance: 20,633; Referee: Adrian Porumboiu (Romania)

6 September UEFA Euro 1996 qualifying	Netherlands	1–0	Belarus	Rotterdam, Netherlands
20:15 UTC+2	Mulder 83'	Report		Stadium: De Kuip; Attendance: 18,830; Referee: Robert Sedlacek (Austria)

11 October UEFA Euro 1996 qualifying	Malta	0–4	Netherlands	Ta'Qali, Malta
20:00 UTC+1		Report	Overmars 52', 61', 66'; Seedorf 82'	Stadium: Ta'Qali Stadium; Attendance: 10,502; Referee: Kim Milton Nielsen (Denmark)

15 November UEFA Euro 1996 qualifying	Netherlands	3–0	Norway	Rotterdam, Netherlands
20:05 UTC+1	Seedorf 47'; Mulder 88'; Overmars 89'	Report		Stadium: De Kuip; Attendance: 42,325; Referee: Dermot Gallagher (England)

13 December UEFA Euro 1996 qualifying play-off	Netherlands	2–0	Republic of Ireland	Liverpool, England
20:00 UTC+0	Kluivert 30', 89'	Report		Stadium: Anfield Road; Attendance: 40,050; Referee: Vadim Zhuk (Belarus)

== 1996 ==
24 April Friendly	Netherlands	0–1	Germany	Rotterdam, Netherlands
20:30 UTC+2		Report	Klinsmann 19' (pen.)	Stadium: De Kuip; Attendance: 27,000; Referee: Pierluigi Collina (Italy)

29 May Friendly	Netherlands	2–0	China	Tilburg, Netherlands
20:30 UTC+2	Winter 42'; De Kock 90' (pen.)	Report		Stadium: Willem II Stadion; Attendance: 12,400; Referee: Alan Shorte (Ireland)

4 June Friendly	Netherlands	3–1	Republic of Ireland	Rotterdam, Netherlands
20:15 UTC+2	Bergkamp 27'; Seedorf 77'; Cocu 88'	Report	Breen 12'	Stadium: De Kuip; Attendance: 15,002; Referee: Finn Lambek (Denmark)

10 June UEFA Euro 1996 Group A	Netherlands	0–0	Scotland	Birmingham, England
16:30 UTC+1		Report		Stadium: Villa Park; Attendance: 34,363; Referee: Leif Sundell (Denmark)

13 June UEFA Euro 1996 Group A	Netherlands	2–0	Switzerland	Birmingham, England
19:30 UTC+1	Cruijff 66'; Bergkamp 79'	Report		Stadium: Villa Park; Attendance: 36,800; Referee: Atanas Uzunov (Bulgaria)

18 June UEFA Euro 1996 Group A	England	4–1	Netherlands	London, England
19:30 UTC+1	Shearer 23' (pen.), 57'; Sheringham 51', 62'	Report	Kluivert 78'	Stadium: Wembley Stadium; Attendance: 76.798; Referee: Gerd Grabher (Austria)

22 June UEFA Euro 1996 Quarter-final	France	0–0 (5–4 p)	Netherlands	Liverpool, England
18:30 UTC+1		Report		Stadium: Anfield Road; Attendance: 37,465; Referee: Antonio López Nieto (Spain)
	Penalties
	Zidane (penalty scored); Djorkaeff (penalty scored); Lizarazu (penalty scored); Guérin (penalty scored); Blanc (penalty scored)		(penalty scored) De Kock; (penalty scored) R. de Boer; (penalty scored) Kluivert; (penalty missed) Seedorf; (penalty scored) Blind

31 August Friendly	Netherlands	2–2	Brazil	Amsterdam, Netherlands
20:00 UTC+2	R. de Boer 52'; Van Gastel 90+4' (pen.)	Report	Giovanni 13'; Gonçalves 55'	Stadium: Amsterdam ArenA; Attendance: 27,500; Referee: Hugh Dallas (Scotland)

5 October 1998 FIFA World Cup qualification	Wales	1–3	Netherlands	Cardiff, Wales
19:00 UTC+1	Saunders 17'	Report	Van Hooijdonk 72', 75'; R. de Boer 79'	Stadium: Cardiff Arms Park; Attendance: 34,560; Referee: Antonio López Nieto (Spain)

9 November 1998 FIFA World Cup qualification	Netherlands	7–1	Wales	Eindhoven, Netherlands
20:00 UTC+1	Bergkamp 21', 72', 78'; R. de Boer 32'; Jonk 33'; F. de Boer 43'; Cocu 60'	Report	Saunders 38'	Stadium: Philips Stadion; Attendance: 26,210; Referee: Vítor Melo Pereira (Portugal)

14 December 1998 FIFA World Cup qualification	Belgium	0–3	Netherlands	Brussels, Belgium
20:00 UTC+1		Report	Bergkamp 24'; Seedorf 29'; Jonk 89' (pen.)	Stadium: King Baudouin Stadium; Attendance: 36,953; Referee: Pierluigi Pairetto (Italy)

== 1997 ==
26 February Friendly	France	2–1	Netherlands	Paris, France
20:45 UTC+1	Pires 75'; Loko 83'	Report	Bergkamp 3'	Stadium: Parc des Princes; Attendance: 35,331; Referee: Ryszard Wojcik (Poland)

29 March 1998 FIFA World Cup qualification	Netherlands	4–0	San Marino	Amsterdam, Netherlands
20:00 UTC+1	Kluivert 44'; F. de Boer 58', 90'; Hooijdonk 82'	Report		Stadium: Amsterdam ArenA; Attendance: 47,000; Referee: Amit Klein (Israel)

2 April 1998 FIFA World Cup qualification	Turkey	1–0	Netherlands	Bursa, Turkey
20:30 UTC+3	Şükür 53'	Report		Stadium: Atatürk Stadium; Attendance: 17,000; Referee: Manuel Díaz Vega (Spain)

30 April 1998 FIFA World Cup qualification	San Marino	0–6	Netherlands	Serravalle, San Marino
20:30 UTC+2		Report	Bergkamp 40', 88'; Winter 62'; Van Hooijdonk 69'; F. de Boer 73'; Bosman 83'	Stadium: Stadio Olimpico; Attendance: 2,832; Referee: Andreas Georgiou (Cyprus)

4 June Friendly	South Africa	0–2	Netherlands	Johannesburg, South Africa
19:00 UTC+2		Report	Van Bronckhorst 8'; Van Gastel 61'	Stadium: First National Bank Stadium; Attendance: 35,000; Referee: Stephen Lodge (England)

6 September 1998 FIFA World Cup qualification	Netherlands	3–1	Belgium	Rotterdam, Netherlands
20:00 UTC+2	Stam 32'; Kluivert 54'; Bergkamp 84'	Report	Staelens 67' (pen.)	Stadium: De Kuip; Attendance: 50,000; Referee: Kim Milton Nielsen (Denmark)

11 October 1998 FIFA World Cup qualification	Netherlands	0–0	Turkey	Amsterdam, Netherlands
20:00 UTC+2		Report		Stadium: Amsterdam ArenA; Attendance: 48,000; Referee: Leif Sundell (Sweden)

== 1998 ==
21 February Friendly	United States	0–2	Netherlands	Miami, United States
14:00 UTC-5		Report	R. de Boer 1'; Seedorf 46'	Stadium: Orange Bowl; Attendance: 20,379; Referee: Benito Archundia (Mexico)

24 February Friendly	Mexico	2–3	Netherlands	Miami Gardens, United States
14:05 UTC-5	Palencia 65'; Garcia Aspe 73' (pen.)	Report	Kluivert 15', 19'; Jonk 21'	Stadium: Pro Player Stadium; Attendance: 17,077; Referee: Brian Hall (United States)

27 May Friendly	Netherlands	0–0	Cameroon	Arnhem, Netherlands
20:00 UTC+2		Report		Stadium: Gelredome; Attendance: 25,000; Referee: Karl-Erik Nilsson (Sweden)

1 June Friendly	Netherlands	5–1	Paraguay	Eindhoven, Netherlands
20:00 UTC+2	Overmars 25', 29'; Kluivert 31'; F. de Boer 58'; Hasselbaink 83'	Report	Campos 2'	Stadium: Philips Stadion; Attendance: 22,000; Referee: Claude Colombo (France)

5 June Friendly	Netherlands	5–1	Nigeria	Amsterdam, Netherlands
20:15 UTC+2	Hasselbaink 32'; Overmars 38'; Kluivert 60', 64'; Van Hooijdonk 77'	Report	Kanu 64' (pen.)	Stadium: Amsterdam ArenA; Attendance: 45,500; Referee: Domenico Messina (Italy)

13 June 1998 FIFA World Cup Group E	Netherlands	0–0	Belgium	Saint-Denis, France
21:00 UTC+2		Report		Stadium: Stade de France; Attendance: 77,000; Referee: Pierluigi Collina (Italy)

20 June 1998 FIFA World Cup Group E	Netherlands	5–0	South Korea	Marseille, France
21:00 UTC+2	Cocu 37'; Overmars 41'; Bergkamp 71'; Van Hooijdonk 80'; R. de Boer 83'	Report		Stadium: Stade Vélodrome; Attendance: 55,000; Referee: Ryszard Wojcik (Poland)

25 June 1998 FIFA World Cup Group E	Netherlands	2–2	Mexico	Saint-Étienne, France
16:00 UTC+2	Cocu 4'; R. de Boer 18'	Report	Peláez 75'; Hernández 90+4'	Stadium: Stade Geoffroy-Guichard; Attendance: 30,600; Referee: Abdul Rahman Al-Zeid (Saudi Arabia)

29 June 1998 FIFA World Cup Round of 16	Netherlands	2–1	FR Yugoslavia	Toulouse, France
21:00 UTC+2	Bergkamp 38'; Davids 90+2'	Report	Komljenović 48'	Stadium: Stade de Toulouse; Attendance: 33,500; Referee: José Garcia Aranda (Spain)

4 July 1998 FIFA World Cup Quarter-final	Netherlands	2–1	Argentina	Marseille, France
16:30 UTC+2	Kluivert 12'; Bergkamp 90'	Report	López 17'	Stadium: Stade Vélodrome; Attendance: 55,000; Referee: Arturo Brizio Carter (Mexico)

7 July 1998 FIFA World Cup Semi-final	Brazil	1–1 (a.e.t.) (4–2 p)	Netherlands	Marseille, France
21:00 UTC+2	Ronaldo 46'	Report	Kluivert 87'	Stadium: Stade Vélodrome; Attendance: 54,000; Referee: Ali Bujsaim (United Arab Emirates)
	Penalties
	Ronaldo (penalty scored); Rivaldo (penalty scored); Emerson (penalty scored); Dunga (penalty scored)		(penalty scored) F. de Boer; (penalty scored) Bergkamp; (penalty missed) Cocu; (penalty missed) R. de Boer

11 July 1998 FIFA World Cup Third place match	Netherlands	1–2	Croatia	Paris, France
21:00 UTC+2	Zenden 21'	Report	Prosinečki 13'; Šuker 35'	Stadium: Parc des Princes; Attendance: 45,500; Referee: Epifanio González (Paraguay)

10 October Friendly	Netherlands	2–0	Peru	Eindhoven, Netherlands
20:30 UTC+2	Stam 57'; Van Vossen 76'	Report		Stadium: Philips Stadion; Attendance: 10,000; Referee: Fritz Stuchlik (Austria)

13 October Friendly	Netherlands	0–0	Ghana	Arnhem, Netherlands
20:30 UTC+2		Report		Stadium: Gelredome; Attendance: 14,500; Referee: Eric Romain (Belgium)

18 November Friendly	Germany	1–1	Netherlands	Gelsenkirchen, Germany
20:30 UTC+2	Marschall 52'	Report	Reiziger 22'	Stadium: Parkstadion; Attendance: 44,962; Referee: Ryszard Wojcik (Poland)

== 1999 ==
10 February Friendly	Netherlands	0–0	Portugal	Paris, France
20:30 UTC+1		Report		Stadium: Parc des Princes; Attendance: 27,443; Referee: Claude Colombo (France)

31 March Friendly	Netherlands	1–1	Argentina	Amsterdam, Netherlands
20:30 UTC+2	Davids 9'	Report	Batistuta 82'	Stadium: Amsterdam ArenA; Attendance: 55,132; Referee: Graham Poll (England)

28 April Friendly	Netherlands	1–2	Morocco	Arnhem, Netherlands
20:30 UTC+2	Van Nistelrooy 88'	Report	Chippo 58'; Bassir 69'	Stadium: Gelredome; Attendance: 24,000; Referee: Ferdinand Messe (Belgium)

5 June Friendly	Brazil	2–2	Netherlands	Salvador, Brazil
16:00 UTC-3	Amoroso 27'; Giovanni 45'	Report	Kluivert 62'; Van Vossen 67'	Stadium: Estádio Fonte Nova; Attendance: 35,000; Referee: Epifanio González (Paraguay)

8 June Friendly	Brazil	3–1	Netherlands	Goiânia, Brazil
16:05 UTC-3	Amoroso 22'; F. de Boer 39' (o.g.); Leonardo 42'	Report	Van Hooijdonk 80'	Stadium: Estádio Serra Dourada; Attendance: 25,000; Referee: Ubaldo Aquino (Paraguay)

18 August Friendly	Denmark	0–0	Netherlands	Copenhagen, Denmark
19:15 UTC+2		Report		Stadium: Parken; Attendance: 17,234; Referee: Morgan Norman (Sweden)

4 September Friendly	Netherlands	5–5	Belgium	Rotterdam, Netherlands
20:30 UTC+2	Davids 37', 42'; Kluivert 45', 59', 70'	Report	Strupar 9', 30'; Goor 50'; Wilmots 52'; E. Mpenza 77'	Stadium: De Kuip; Attendance: 25,000; Referee: Urs Meier (Switzerland)

9 October Friendly	Netherlands	2–2	Brazil	Amsterdam, Netherlands
20:30 UTC+2	Bergkamp 37'; Zenden 43'	Report	Roberto Carlos 55'; Cafú 72'	Stadium: Amsterdam ArenA; Attendance: 51,000; Referee: Markus Merk (Germany)

13 November Friendly	Netherlands	1–1	Czech Republic	Eindhoven, Netherlands
20:30 UTC+1	Stam 59'	Report	Koller 67'	Stadium: Philips Stadion; Attendance: 27,000; Referee: Dani Koren (Israel)

== See also ==
- Netherlands national football team results
