= Dennis Bergkamp =

Dutch football coach and player (born 1969)

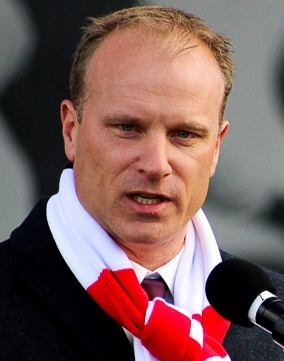
- Bergkamp in 2014

Personal information
- Full name: Dennis Nicolaas Maria Bergkamp
- Date of birth: 10 May 1969 (age 57)
- Place of birth: Amsterdam, Netherlands
- Height: 1.83 m (6 ft 0 in)
- Positions: Forward; attacking midfielder

Youth career
- 1981–1986: Ajax

Senior career*
Years	Team	Apps	(Gls)
1986–1993	Ajax	185	(103)
1993–1995	Inter Milan	52	(11)
1995–2006	Arsenal	315	(87)
Total		552	(201)

International career
1989	Netherlands U21	2	(0)
1990–2000	Netherlands	79	(37)
- * Club domestic league appearances and goals

Dennis Nicolaas Maria Bergkamp (Dutch pronunciation: [ˈdɛnəz ˈbɛr(ə)xkɑmp]; born 10 May 1969) is a Dutch professional football coach and former player. Originally a wide midfielder, Bergkamp was moved to main striker while still a teenager and then played as a deeper lying forward for the remainder of his career.

Bergkamp was born in Amsterdam and played as an amateur in the lower leagues. He was spotted by Ajax at age 11 and made his professional debut in 1986. Prolific form led to an international call-up with the Netherlands in 1990, attracting the attention of several European clubs. Bergkamp signed for Italian club Inter Milan in 1993, where he had two underwhelming seasons. After joining Arsenal in 1995, he rejuvenated his career, helping the club to win three Premier League titles (one unbeaten), four FA Cup trophies, and reach the 2006 UEFA Champions League final. Despite noting a desire to not go into coaching, Bergkamp served as an assistant at Ajax between 2011 and 2017.

With the Netherlands national team, Bergkamp was selected for Euro 1992, where he impressed, scoring three goals as his country reached the semi-finals. At the 1998 FIFA World Cup, he scored a memorable winning goal in the final minute of the quarter-final against Argentina which has been regarded as one of the greatest FIFA World Cup goals. Bergkamp surpassed Faas Wilkes's record to become the country's top scorer of all time in 1998, a record later eclipsed by Patrick Kluivert, Klaas-Jan Huntelaar, Robin van Persie, and Memphis Depay.

Bergkamp has been described by Jan Mulder as having "the finest technique" of any Dutch international and a "dream for a striker" by teammate Thierry Henry. Bergkamp finished third twice in the FIFA World Player of the Year award and was selected by Pelé as one of the FIFA 100 greatest living players. He is widely regarded as one of the greatest players of his generation, one of the greatest players in Premier League history and amongst Ajax's and Arsenal's greatest ever players. In 2007, he was inducted into the English Football Hall of Fame, the first and only Dutch player ever to receive the honour. Bergkamp was inducted into the Premier League Hall of Fame in 2021. In 2017, Bergkamp's goal against Newcastle United in 2002 was voted as the best Premier League goal in the league's 25-year history: it involved a flick around Newcastle defender Nikos Dabizas before the ball was calmly sent into the net.

== Early life ==
Born in Amsterdam, Bergkamp was the last of Wim and Tonnie Bergkamp's four sons. He was brought up in a working-class suburb, in a family aspiring to reach middle-class status. His father, an electrician and amateur footballer in the lower leagues, named him in honour of Scottish striker Denis Law. To comply with Dutch given name customs, an extra "n" was inserted in Bergkamp's first name by his father after it was not accepted by the registrar. Bergkamp was raised as a Roman Catholic by his family and regularly attended church during his childhood. Although in later years he said visits to church did not appeal to him, Bergkamp still maintains his faith. According to Bergkamp, his childhood footballing heroes were Glenn Hoddle, whom he admired for his soft precise touch, and Johan Cruyff, who once coached him when he was twelve.

== Club career ==
=== Ajax: 1986–1993 ===
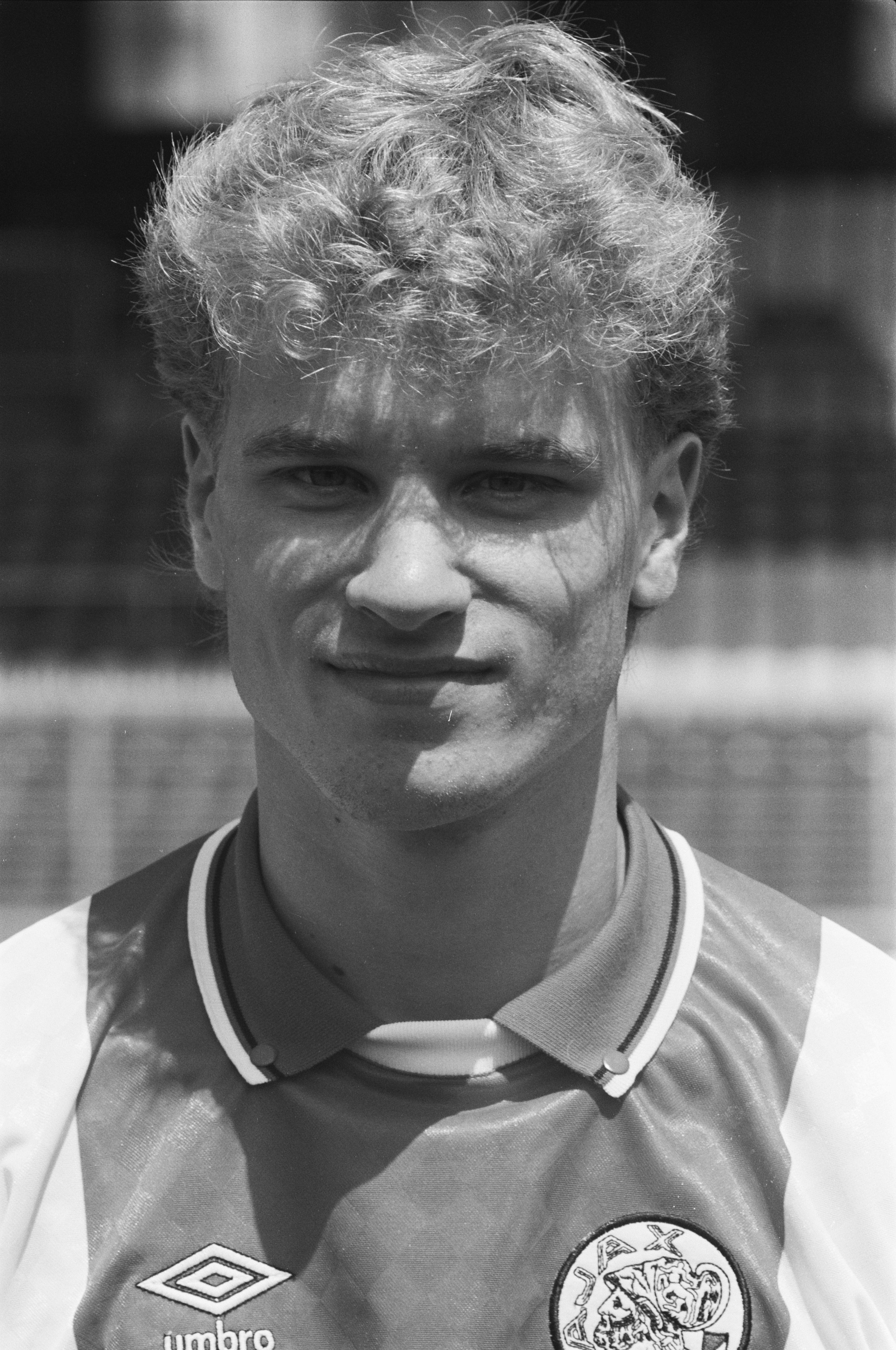
Bergkamp at Ajax in 1989

Bergkamp was brought up through Ajax's youth system, joining the club at age 11. Manager Johan Cruyff gave him his professional debut on 14 December 1986 against Roda JC; the match ended in a 2–0 victory for Ajax. Bergkamp scored his first senior goal for the club against HFC Haarlem on 22 February 1987 in a match Ajax won 6–0. He went on to make 23 appearances in the 1986–87 season, including a European debut against Malmö FF in the 1986–87 European Cup Winners' Cup, earning him praise. Ajax won the competition, beating Lokomotive Leipzig 1–0 as Bergkamp made an appearance as a substitute.

In later seasons, Bergkamp established himself as a first-team player for Ajax. This culminated in a period of success for the club, which won the Eredivisie title in the 1989–90 season for the first time in five years. Bergkamp scored 29 goals in 36 matches the following season and became the joint top scorer in the league, sharing the accolade with PSV striker Romário.

Ajax won the 1992 UEFA Cup final, beating Torino through the away goals ruling. They then defeated Heerenveen 6–2 in the final of the KNVB Cup on 20 May 1993. Bergkamp was the top scorer in the Eredivisie from 1991 to 1993 and was voted Dutch Footballer of the Year in 1992 and 1993. In total, he scored 122 goals in 239 matches for his hometown club.

=== Inter Milan: 1993–1995 ===
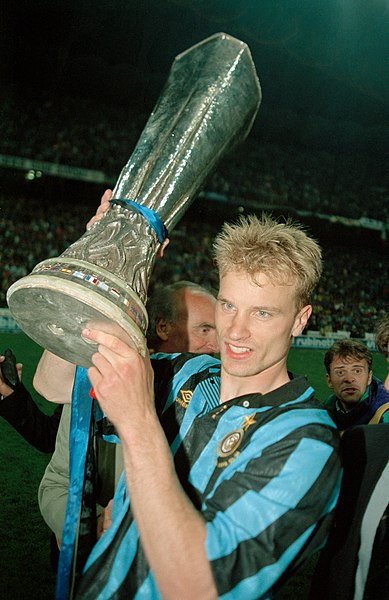
Bergkamp holding the UEFA Cup trophy after Inter Milan's win in the 1994 UEFA Cup final

Bergkamp attracted the attention of several European clubs as a result of his performances for Ajax. Fellow Dutchman and then FC Barcelona Johan Cruyff, in an attempt to encourage Bergkamp to sign for Barcelona, advised him not to join Spanish rivals Real Madrid, one of the teams said to have been interested in him, but Bergkamp was primarily interested in a move to Italy. Bergkamp considered Serie A "the biggest league at the time" but after the success of fellow countrymen Marco van Basten, Ruud Gullit and Frank Rijkaard at AC Milan he preferred a move to either Juventus or Inter Milan to help distinguish himself. On 16 February 1993, Bergkamp agreed a £7.1 million move to the latter club in a deal which included his Ajax teammate Wim Jonk. Upon signing, Bergkamp said Inter "met all my demands. The most important thing for me was the stadium, the people at the club and their style of play."

Bergkamp made his debut against Reggiana on 29 August 1993 at the San Siro in a 2–1 victory. He scored his first goal for the club against Cremonese in September 1993 but had a difficult time against the highly organised and resolute Italian defences, scoring a further seven goals in the league. This was partly due to manager Osvaldo Bagnoli's inability to find a stable forward partnership, preferring Bergkamp in a three with Rubén Sosa and Salvatore Schillaci. Inter's poor league form culminated in the sacking of Bagnoli in February 1994 and his replacement by Gianpiero Marini, a member of Italy's 1982 FIFA World Cup-winning squad. The club finished 13th in Serie A, one point away from relegation, but enjoyed success in the UEFA Cup, beating Austria Salzburg in the final over two legs. Bergkamp was the competition's joint top scorer with eight goals and scored a hat-trick against Rapid București in the first round.

In Bergkamp's second season at Inter, the club changed managers again, appointing Ottavio Bianchi. Bergkamp endured a disappointing campaign, troubled with stress injuries and fatigue from the 1994 World Cup. He managed to score 5 goals in 26 appearances. Off the field, Bergkamp's relationship with the Italian press and fans became uncomfortable. His shy persona and his propensity to go home after matches was interpreted as apathy. Because of his poor performance on the pitch, one Italian publication renamed their award given to the worst performance of the week, L'asino della settimana (Donkey of the Week) to Bergkamp della settimana. Inter ended the league season in sixth position and failed to retain the UEFA Cup, with the club eliminated in the second round. In February 1995, the club was purchased by Italian businessman and fan Massimo Moratti, who promised to invest heavily in the squad. Bergkamp's future in the first team was uncertain following the signing of Maurizio Ganz a month after the takeover.

=== Arsenal: 1995–2006 ===
As Moratti prepared to make wholesale changes at the club, Bergkamp left Inter and signed with Arsenal in June 1995 for a transfer fee estimated at £7.5 million. He became manager Bruce Rioch's first signing at Arsenal and broke the club's prior transfer fee record of £2.5 million. Bergkamp's arrival at the club was significant not only because he was an established international footballer who looked to have his best years ahead of him but also because of his perceived difference in style with the Arsenal team of the 90's who had become a defensive and low scoring team under George Graham, plagued by a drinking culture.

On the opening day of the 1995–96 league season, Bergkamp made his full debut against Middlesbrough. He initially struggled to adapt to the English game and failed to score in the club's next six league matches, prompting ridicule by the national press. On 23 September 1995, Bergkamp scored his first and second goals for Arsenal against Southampton at Highbury. Bergkamp ended his first season with 33 appearances and 11 goals, helping Arsenal finish fifth and earn a place in the UEFA Cup by scoring the winner against Bolton Wanderers on the final day of the season.

The appointment of Arsène Wenger as Arsenal manager in September 1996 marked a turning point in Bergkamp's career. Wenger, who had been a successful manager in France and Japan, recognised Bergkamp's talent and wanted to use him as a fulcrum of the team's forward play. Both were advocates of a continental style of attacking football, and Wenger's decision to impose a strict fitness and health regimen pleased Bergkamp. Despite making fewer appearances in the 1996–97 season, Bergkamp was more influential in the first team, providing 13 assists. Against Tottenham Hotspur in November 1996, he set up an 88th-minute winner for captain Tony Adams to volley in using his left foot. He then scored in injury time, controlling a high ball with his left foot and evading his marker Stephen Carr in a tight area to set up his shot. Bergkamp received his first red card against Sunderland in January 1997 for a high tackle on midfielder Paul Bracewell in the 26th minute. Arsenal went on to lose the match 1–0, but a run of 8 wins in their final 16 matches gave the club a third-place finish, missing out on a spot in the UEFA Champions League via goal difference.

Bergkamp was instrumental the following season in helping Arsenal complete a domestic league and cup double. He became the club's top scorer with 22 goals and recorded a strike rate of 0.57. Arsenal's achievement was all the more astonishing given the team, written off by many in December 1997, had made ground on reigning Premier League champions Manchester United. Early in the season away to Leicester City at Filbert Street on 23 August 1997, Bergkamp scored his first hat-trick for the club. The third goal, which he regarded as his favourite for Arsenal, required just one touch to control the ball in the penalty box, another to flick it past his marker Matt Elliott before juggling it with his feet and shooting past goalkeeper Kasey Keller. After the match, Leicester manager Martin O'Neill stated that Bergkamp's was "the best hat-trick I've ever seen". In an FA Cup quarter-final replay against West Ham United on 17 March 1998, Bergkamp was sent off for elbowing midfielder Steve Lomas and missed three matches due to suspension. He played no further part in Arsenal's season after overstretching his hamstring against Derby County on 29 April 1998, missing the 1998 FA Cup final. Bergkamp was consoled with the PFA Players' Player of the Year award, becoming only the third non-British player to be recognised by his fellow professionals as the outstanding performer in English football.

After an effective 1998 World Cup campaign with the national team, Bergkamp had another productive season in 1998–99. Although Arsenal failed to retain the Premier League after losing the title on the final day of the season to Manchester United, Bergkamp was the club's second-top scorer in all competitions, with 16 goals, and finished the season as the top assist provider in the Premier League, alongside Jimmy Floyd Hasselbaink, with 13 assists. Arsenal were also defeated in a FA Cup semi-final replay against Manchester United in April 1999. With the score 1–1 heading into injury time, Arsenal were awarded a penalty after midfielder Ray Parlour was brought down by Phil Neville inside the 18-yard box. Bergkamp took the penalty shot but it was saved by goalkeeper Peter Schmeichel. In the second half of extra time, Ryan Giggs scored the winner, a goal regarded by many as the greatest in the competition's history. After this miss, Bergkamp did not take another penalty for the remainder of his career.

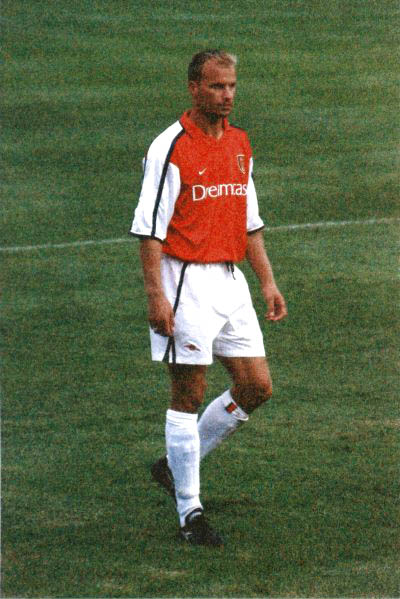
Bergkamp playing for Arsenal in 2001

The 1999–2000 season proved to be a frustrating one for both Arsenal and Bergkamp. The club finished second in the league, 18 points behind Manchester United, and lost in the 2000 UEFA Cup final to Turkish opponents Galatasaray on penalties. The departure of compatriot Marc Overmars and French midfielder Emmanuel Petit in the close season led to speculation over Bergkamp's future. He ultimately agreed terms on a contract extension in December 2000. Despite an array of new signings made in the 2000–01 season, Arsenal were runners-up in the league for a third year in succession. The emergence of Thierry Henry and Sylvain Wiltord as the main strikers saw Bergkamp's first-team opportunities limited as a result. He was used as a late substitute in Liverpool's win over Arsenal in the 2001 FA Cup final.

Success finally came in the 2001–02 season. Arsenal regained the league, beating Manchester United at Old Trafford in the penultimate game of the season to complete the club's second double under Wenger; Arsenal defeated Chelsea 2–0 to win the FA Cup four days prior. Bergkamp played in 33 league matches, setting up 15 goals, one of which was against Juventus in the second group stage of the Champions League. Holding off two markers, he twisted and turned before feeding the ball to Freddie Ljungberg in the penalty box to score. Bergkamp headed in the winner against Liverpool in a FA Cup fourth-round tie on 27 January 2002, but was shown a red card for a two-footed lunge on defender Jamie Carragher, who himself was sent off for throwing a coin into the crowd. He was subsequently banned for three matches (two league, one FA Cup round). Bergkamp appealed for his ban, but was unsuccessful. He made his return against Newcastle United on 3 March 2002. Early in the match, Arsenal midfielder Robert Pires played a low pass from the left flank to Bergkamp in the edge of the opponent area with his back to goal. Under pressure from his marker Nikos Dabizas, Bergkamp controlled the ball with one flick and went around the other side before placing the ball precisely into the bottom right-hand corner to score. Wenger described the goal as "unbelievable", adding "It was not only a magnificent goal but a very important one – I enjoyed it a lot". Bergkamp featured in nine out of the last ten league games, forming a productive partnership with Ljungberg.

"You can't blame anyone for that. You just have to accept that Bergkamp did a beautiful thing."

— Sir Bobby Robson on Dennis Bergkamp's goal against Newcastle United in March 2002.

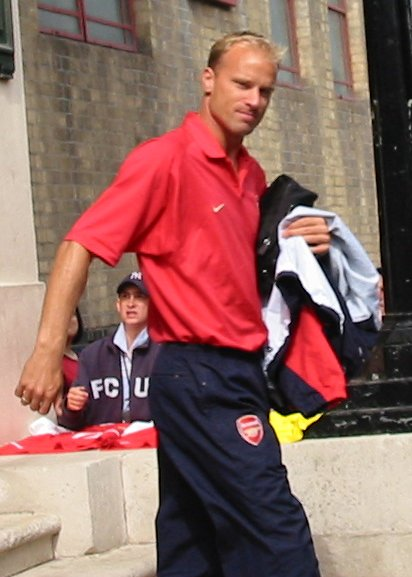
Bergkamp with Arsenal in 2003

Bergkamp reached a personal landmark during the 2002–03 season, scoring his 100th goal for Arsenal against Oxford United in a FA Cup third-round tie on 4 January 2003. In the league, Arsenal failed to retain the championship despite having led by eight points in March 2003. However, they did win the FA Cup for a second successive year, beating Southampton in the 2003 FA Cup final. On 20 July 2003, Bergkamp signed a one-year extension at the club. The 2003–04 season ended on a high point for Bergkamp as Arsenal reclaimed the league title, becoming the first English team in more than a century to go through the entire domestic league season unbeaten. Against Leicester City in the final league match of the campaign with the score tied at 1–1, Bergkamp set up the winner with a pass to captain Patrick Vieira. Vieira rounded the goalkeeper and scored. The team, dubbed "The Invincibles" did not achieve similar dominance in Europe; Arsenal were beaten by Chelsea in the quarter-finals of the Champions League over two legs. Bergkamp committed himself to Arsenal at the end of the season, signing a further extension to his contract.

Bergkamp started in 29 league matches in the 2004–05 season, but Arsenal's title defence ended unsuccessfully. The team finished second, 12 points behind Chelsea. At home against Middlesbrough on 22 August 2004, Bergkamp acted as captain for the injured Vieira in a match where Arsenal came back from 1–3 down to win 5–3 and equal Nottingham Forest's record of 42 league matches undefeated. Against Sheffield United in the FA Cup on 19 February 2005, Bergkamp was shown a straight red card by referee Neale Barry for shoving defender Danny Cullip. His appeal of the decision was rejected by The Football Association (FA), meaning he missed the club's next three domestic games. In Arsenal's final home match of the season, against Everton, Bergkamp had a man of the match game, scoring once and assisting three of the goals in a 7–0 win. Bergkamp was moved by Arsenal supporters chanting "one more year", describing it as "quite special". "They obviously feel there is another year left in me, so that's great as it shows they're really behind me," he said. Following Arsenal's penalty shootout victory over Manchester United in the 2005 FA Cup final, he signed a one-year contract extension.

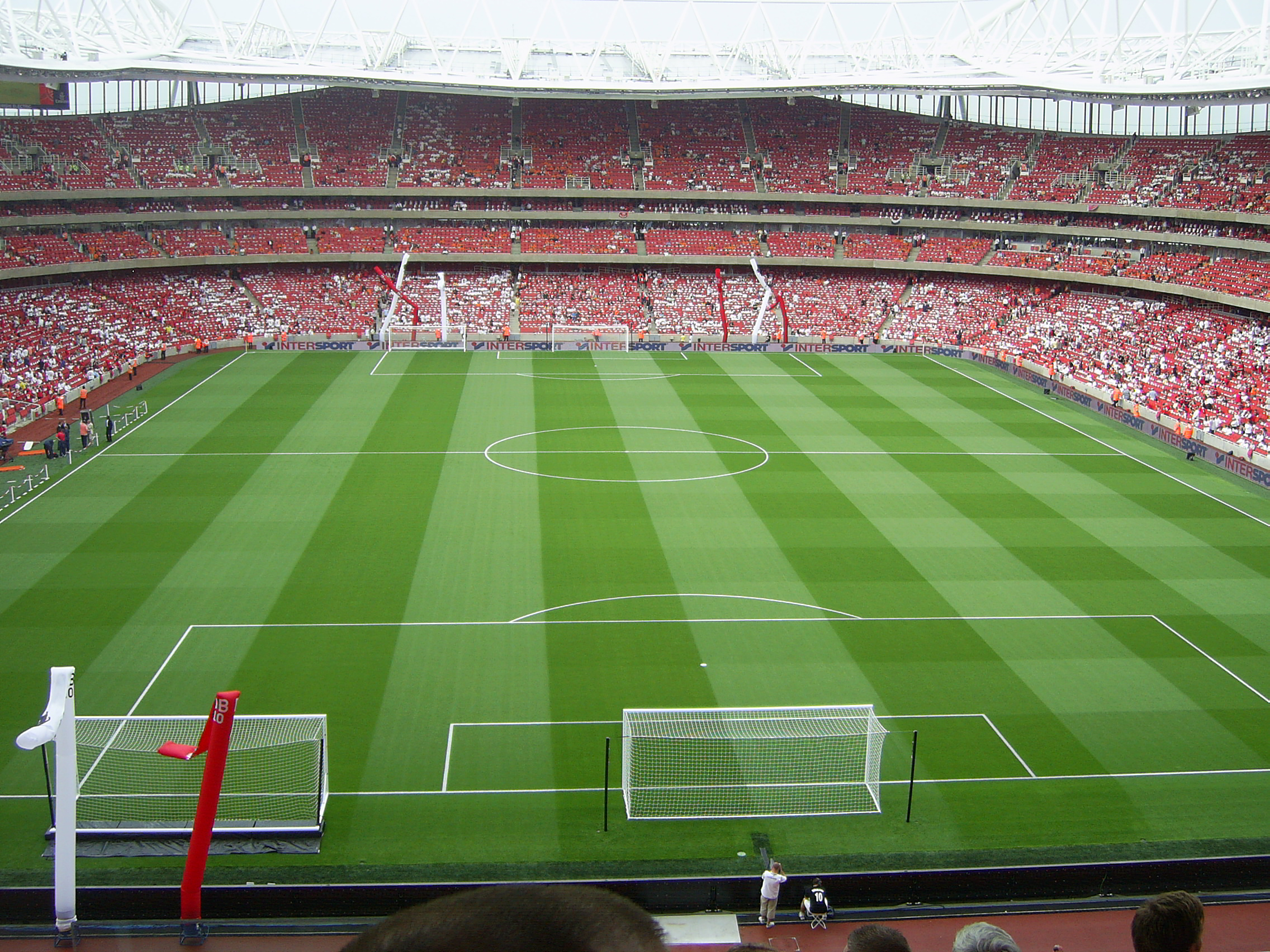
The Emirates Stadium filling up during Bergkamp's testimonial match between Arsenal and Ajax in July 2006

The team finished fourth in the league in Bergkamp's final season at Arsenal. Bergkamp scored an injury-time winner against Thun on Matchday 1 of the Champions League, having come on as a substitute in the 72nd minute. After much campaigning from Arsenal supporters, the club designated one of its Highbury matchday themes, organised to commemorate the stadium's final season as home of Arsenal, to Dennis Bergkamp. "Bergkamp Day" took place on 15 April 2006 and saw Arsenal up against West Bromwich Albion. It celebrated the player's contribution to Arsenal; fans were given commemorative orange "DB10" T-shirts – the colour of his national team, his initials and his squad number. Bergkamp himself came on as a second-half substitute and set up the winning Robert Pires goal moments after Nigel Quashie had levelled the scoreline. Fittingly, Bergkamp's 89th-minute goal proved to be his last for Arsenal in competitive football. Bergkamp was an unused substitute in his final match for Arsenal against Barcelona in the Champions League final; Barcelona scored twice in the last 13 minutes to overturn Arsenal's early lead and win the competition.

Bergkamp was the focus of the first match at Arsenal's new ground, the Emirates Stadium. On 22 July 2006, a testimonial was played in his honour at the new stadium as Arsenal played his old club Ajax. Bergkamp kicked off the match with his father, Wim, and son, Mitchel. All four children acted as the match's mascots. The first half was played by members of Arsenal and Ajax's current squads, while the second was played by famous ex-players from both sides, including Ian Wright, Patrick Vieira, Marc Overmars, Emmanuel Petit and David Seaman for Arsenal; and Johan Cruyff, Marco van Basten, Danny Blind, Frank and Ronald de Boer for Ajax. Arsenal won the match 2–1 with goals from Henry and Nwankwo Kanu. Klaas-Jan Huntelaar had earlier opened the scoring for Ajax, making him the first goalscorer at the Emirates Stadium.

== International career ==
Bergkamp made his international debut for the Netherlands national team against Italy on 26 September 1990 as a substitute for Frank de Boer. He scored his first goal for the team against Greece on 21 November 1990. Bergkamp was selected for Euro 1992, where his national team were the defending champions. Bergkamp impressed, scoring three goals in the tournament and finishing as one of the joint top goalscorers of the competition. However, his team lost on penalties to eventual champions Denmark in the semi-final, following a 2–2 draw; during the match, Bergkamp scored the first Dutch goal to tie the match 1–1, and also netted his penalty in the shootout. He also scored the only goal of the match in the Netherlands' opening win against Scotland, and the final goal in a 3–1 win over Germany in their first round match, which allowed them to top their group. Bergkamp was named in the Team of the Tournament for his performances.

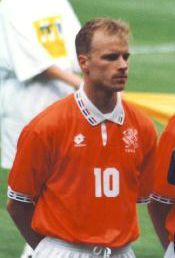
Bergkamp lines up prior to a Euro 1996 match against Scotland

In the qualification for the 1994 FIFA World Cup, Bergkamp scored five goals and was selected for the finals, staged in the United States. He featured in every game for the national team, getting a goal against Morocco in the group stages (in addition to assisting Bryan Roy's late winner) and another one in a 2–0 win against the Republic of Ireland in the round-of-16. Bergkamp scored the first goal for the Netherlands against eventual champions Brazil, but the team lost 3–2, exiting in the quarter-finals. At Euro 1996, Bergkamp scored against Switzerland and set up striker Patrick Kluivert's consolation goal against England, who advanced into the quarter-finals as first in their group while the Dutch finished second and faced France, being eliminated after a penalty shootout, following a 0–0 draw.

Against Wales in the 1998 FIFA World Cup qualification on 9 November 1996, he scored his first hat-trick for the national team. The Netherlands finished first in their group and qualified for the 1998 FIFA World Cup, held in France. Bergkamp scored three times in the competition, including a memorable winning goal in the final minute of the quarter-final against Argentina. He took one touch to control a long 60-yard aerial pass from Frank de Boer, brought the ball down through Argentine defender Roberto Ayala's legs, and finally finished by firing a volley with the outside of his right foot, past keeper Carlos Roa at a tight angle from the right. The goal, cited by Bergkamp as his favourite in his career, was his 36th for the national team, overtaking Faas Wilkes as the record scorer. Bergkamp had also previously set-up Kluivert's opening goal with his head.

"I mean, I've seen it a lot of times and still can't find my mistake in that move. In the area, I did not make any mistake. There is incredible control by him."

— Argentine defender Roberto Ayala on Bergkamp's goal in the Netherlands' 2–1 victory over Argentina in the 1998 World Cup quarter-finals

His other two goals of the tournament came in the Netherlands' 5–0 victory over South Korea on 20 June, in the team's second group match (scoring the third goal, in addition to setting up Phillip Cocu's opener), and in the 2–1 win over Yugoslavia on 26 June in the round of 16, in which Bergkamp opened the scoring in the first half. He also assisted Cocu's opening goal in the final group match, a 2–2 draw against Mexico, on 25 June. In the semi-finals, the Netherlands lost to defending champions Brazil on penalties after drawing 1–1 in normal time, with Bergkamp netting his spot-kick in the shoot-out. Bergkamp made the All-Star team of the tournament, alongside compatriots Frank de Boer and Edgar Davids.

On 9 October 1999, Bergkamp scored his final goal for the Netherlands, against Brazil. As the Netherlands were co-hosts for Euro 2000, the team automatically qualified for the tournament and were considered favourites. Bergkamp went scoreless throughout the competition, but assisted three goals: he set-up Kluivert's goal in the Netherlands' final group match, a 3–2 win over eventual champions France, which allowed them to top their group, and also assisted two goals (Kluivert's opener and the first of Marc Overmars's two goals) in a 6–1 win over Yugoslavia in the quarter-finals. In the semi-finals, the Netherlands lost 3–1 on penalties to Italy, following a 0–0 draw. Following the defeat, Bergkamp announced his retirement from international football, choosing to focus on his club career. His final goal tally of 37 goals in 79 appearances was overtaken by Patrick Kluivert in June 2003.

== Player profile ==
=== Style of play ===
"He needs fewer touches to score. Sometimes just one, when others need two or three."

— Arsène Wenger on Bergkamp

Bergkamp was schooled in Dutch Total Football, a playing style and philosophy which relied on versatility. This was primarily to maximise the footballer's potential; players tried out every outfield position before finding one that suited them best. Every age group at Ajax played in the same style and formation as the first team – 3–4–3 – to allow individuals to slot in without effort when moving up the pyramid. Bergkamp "played in every position apart from goalie" and believed he benefited from the experience of playing as a defender, as it helped him "know how they think and how to beat them". When he made his debut as a substitute against Roda JC, Bergkamp was positioned on the right wing, where he remained for three years.

During his time at Inter Milan, Bergkamp was switched to the position of a main striker, but failed to cooperate with his offensive partner Rubén Sosa, whom he later called "selfish". Furthermore, due to his introverted character, he was accused of lacking consistency and leadership skills by the Italian press, and struggled to replicate his previous form during his time with Inter. When Bergkamp joined Arsenal in 1995, he enjoyed a successful strike partnership with Ian Wright, and in later seasons, Nicolas Anelka and Thierry Henry, playing in his preferred position as a creative second striker. The arrival of Overmars in the 1997–98 season enhanced Bergkamp's play, as he was getting more of the ball. Between August and October 1997, he scored seven goals in seven league matches. A similar rapport developed between him and Freddie Ljungberg during the 2001–02 season.

Although he was known for his composure and ability to score several goals for his team as a forward, Bergkamp was also capable of playing in a free role behind a lone striker, where he essentially functioned in the number 10 role as a playmaking attacking midfielder or deep-lying forward, due to his ball skills and creative ability, which enabled him to drop deep between the lines and link-up play, and operate across all attacking areas of the pitch. His tendency to move freely about the entire front-line made it difficult for opposing defenders to mark him. As such, Sam Tighe of Bleacher Report has retroactively compared Bergkamp's role as a free centre-forward to that of the modern false 9. A quick, elegant, intelligent, and gifted player, who was regarded as one of the most technically accomplished players of all time, he possessed an excellent first touch, which – allied with his quick feet, dribbling ability and change of pace – enabled him to beat defenders in one on one situations, while his attacking movement, physique, balance, and close control allowed him to hold up the ball and create space for teammates; his vision and passing range with both feet, despite being naturally right-footed, subsequently allowed him to provide assists for on-running strikers. Bergkamp often stated he preferred playing in this deeper role, as he derived more pleasure from assisting goals, rather than scoring them himself.

Throughout his playing career, Bergkamp was accused of diving, and was referred to as a "cheat" and "dirty player" for retaliating against players who had previously challenged him, something his former manager Wenger denied. In an interview with The Times in 2004, he said that while he was at Inter, he realised the importance of being mentally tough in order to survive: "A lot of people there try to hurt you, not just physically but mentally as well, and coming from the easygoing culture in Holland, I had to adopt a tougher approach. There, it was a case of two strikers up against four or five hard defenders who would stop at nothing." Bergkamp says his aggression often stems from frustration.

=== Reception ===
He is widely regarded by pundits as one of the greatest players of his generation, one of the greatest players in Premier League history and amongst Ajax's and Arsenal's greatest ever players. Bergkamp has received several accolades during his playing career. He twice finished in third place for the 1993 and 1997 FIFA World Player of the Year award and was named in FIFA 100, a list compiled by footballer Pelé of the 125 greatest living footballers. In his club career, Bergkamp won two successive Dutch Footballer of the Year awards in 1991 and 1992 and was the Eredivisie top scorer for three consecutive seasons (1990–91 to 1992–93). He was named the FWA Footballer of the Year and PFA Players' Player of the Year in April and May 1998 and made the PFA Team of the Year for the 1997–98 season. Bergkamp also achieved a unique feat in being voted first, second and third on Match of the Day's Goal of the Month competition in August 1997. For his national team, Bergkamp was the joint top scorer at Euro 1992 and was selected in the All-Star team for the tournament, an honour he also received at the 1998 FIFA World Cup.

In April 2007, Bergkamp was inducted into the English Football Hall of Fame by viewers of BBC's Football Focus. A year later, he was voted second by Arsenal fans behind Thierry Henry in a list of the 50 Gunners Greatest Players. In February 2014, Arsenal unveiled a statue of Bergkamp outside the Emirates Stadium to honour his time at the club. A statue of Dennis Bergkamp will be erected outside the KNVB headquarters in Zeist, as he has been chosen as the best Dutch international player from 1990 to 2015. The statue will join those of "the eleven of the century", erected in 1999, alongside statues of Johan Cruyff, Ruud Gullit, Frank Rijkaard and Marco van Basten, amongst others. In September 2023, FourFourTwo magazine ranked Bergkamp 68th in their list of the "100 best football players of all time."

Bergkamp has been described by Jan Mulder as having "the finest technique" of any Dutch international and as a "dream for a striker" by former Arsenal teammate Thierry Henry.

== Coaching career ==
Upon retiring, Bergkamp insisted he would not move into coaching. He turned down an offer to scout for Arsenal and instead concentrated on travelling and spending time with his family. However, in April 2008, he began a fast-track coaching diploma for former Dutch international footballers and undertook a trainee role at Ajax. Having completed the Coach Betaald Voetbal course by the Royal Dutch Football Association (KNVB), Bergkamp was appointed assistant to Johan Neeskens for the newly formed Netherlands B team on 26 October 2008. For the 2008–09 season, Bergkamp returned to Ajax in a formal coaching position with responsibility for the D2 (U12) youth team. Following the promotion of Frank de Boer as manager of Ajax in December 2010, Bergkamp was appointed as assistant manager to Fred Grim, dealing with Ajax' flagship A1 (U19) youth team.

In August 2011, Bergkamp was named as De Boer's assistant at Ajax. However, after the arrival of Peter Bosz as the new head coach at Ajax, Bergkamp's role at Ajax slightly changed. He no longer sat on the bench during first-team matches, but instead focused more on field training and on helping youth players reach the first team. He and fellow assistant Hennie Spijkerman were sacked from their roles in December 2017.

== Personal life ==
Bergkamp has been married to Henrita Ruizendaal since 16 June 1993. The couple have four children. His son Mitchel is a footballer. His daughter is the partner of Girona midfielder Donny van de Beek, the couple's first daughter having been born on 9 April 2022.

His nephew, Roland Bergkamp, was a professional footballer.

In addition to his native Dutch, Bergkamp speaks fluent English and Italian.

=== Aviophobia ===
Bergkamp's nickname is the "Non-Flying Dutchman" due to his fear of flying. Contemporary sources believed that this stemmed from incidents with the Netherlands national team at the 1994 World Cup where the engine of the plane cut out during a flight, and when a flight was delayed because a journalist made a joke about having a bomb in his bag. In his 2013 autobiography, Bergkamp stated that his phobia was in fact caused during his first season at Inter Milan, in which the team regularly travelled to away games in small aeroplanes. Bergkamp decided he would never fly again after the 1994 World Cup, but did consider seeking psychiatric help in 1996:

I've got this problem and I have to live with it. I can't do anything about it, it is a psychological thing and I can't explain it. I have not flown on a plane for two years. The Dutch FA has been sympathetic, so have Arsenal, so far. I am considering psychiatric help. I can't fly. I just freeze. I get panicky. It starts the day before, when I can't sleep.

The condition severely limited his ability to play in away matches in European competitions and to travel with the national team. In some cases, he would travel overland by car or train, but the logistics of some matches were such that he would not travel at all. In the build-up to Arsenal's Champions League match against Lyon in February 2001, Wenger spoke of his concerns for Bergkamp travelling by train and car, because of the exertions involved.

== Media ==
Bergkamp features in EA Sports' FIFA video game series; he was on the cover for the International edition of FIFA 99, and was named in the Ultimate Team Legends in FIFA 14.

== Career statistics ==
=== Club ===
Appearances and goals by club, season and competition
Club	Season	League			National cup (Note: Includes KNVB Cup, Coppa Italia, FA Cup)		League cup (Note: Includes Football League Cup)		Europe		Other		Total	
Club	Season	Division	Apps	Goals	Apps	Goals	Apps	Goals	Apps	Goals	Apps	Goals	Apps	Goals
Ajax	1986–87	Eredivisie	14	2	5	0	–		4 (Note: Appearances in European Cup Winners' Cup)	0	–		23	2
Ajax	1987–88	Eredivisie	25	5	1	0	–		6	1	2 (Note: Appearances in European Super Cup)	0	34	6
Ajax	1988–89	Eredivisie	30	13	3	3	–		1 (Note: Appearances in UEFA Cup)	0	–		34	16
Ajax	1989–90	Eredivisie	25	8	2	1	–		1	0	–		28	9
Ajax	1990–91	Eredivisie	33	25	3	1	–		0	0	–		36	26
Ajax	1991–92	Eredivisie	30	24	3	0	–		11	6	–		44	30
Ajax	1992–93	Eredivisie	28	26	4	4	–		8	3	–		40	33
Ajax	Total		185	103	21	9	–		31	10	2	0	239	122
Inter Milan	1993–94	Serie A	31	8	6	2	–		11	8	–		48	18
Inter Milan	1994–95	Serie A	21	3	3	0	–		2	1	–		26	4
Inter Milan	Total		52	11	9	2	–		13	9	–		74	22
Arsenal	1995–96	Premier League	33	11	1	0	7	5	–		–		41	16
Arsenal	1996–97	Premier League	29	12	2	1	2	1	1	0	–		34	14
Arsenal	1997–98	Premier League	28	16	7	3	4	2	1	1	–		40	22
Arsenal	1998–99	Premier League	29	12	6	3	1	0	3 (Note: Appearances in UEFA Champions League)	1	1 (Note: Appearance in FA Charity Shield)	0	40	16
Arsenal	1999–2000	Premier League	28	6	0	0	0	0	11 (Note: Five appearances and one goal in UEFA Champions League, six appearances and three goals in UEFA Cup)	4	0	0	39	10
Arsenal	2000–01	Premier League	25	3	5	1	0	0	5	1	–		35	5
Arsenal	2001–02	Premier League	33	9	6	3	1	0	6	2	–		46	14
Arsenal	2002–03	Premier League	29	4	4	2	0	0	7	1	1 (Note: Appearance in FA Community Shield)	0	41	7
Arsenal	2003–04	Premier League	28	4	3	1	0	0	6	0	1	0	38	5
Arsenal	2004–05	Premier League	29	8	4	0	0	0	4	0	1	0	38	8
Arsenal	2005–06	Premier League	24	2	1	0	1	0	4	1	1	0	31	3
Arsenal	Total		315	87	39	14	16	8	48	11	5	0	423	120
Career total			552	201	69	25	16	8	92	30	7	0	736	264

=== International ===
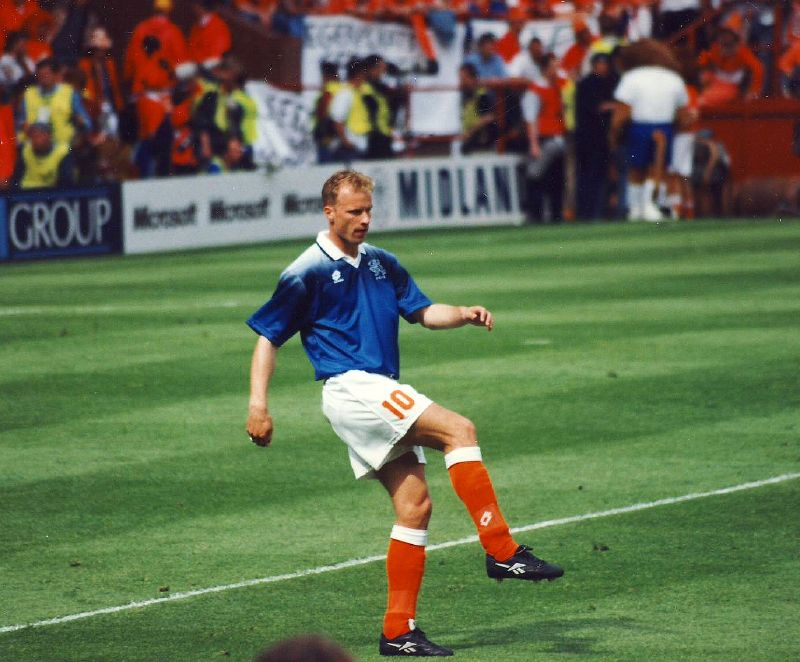
Bergkamp before an international match in 1996

Appearances and goals by national team and year
National team	Year	Apps	Goals
Netherlands	1990	4	3
Netherlands	1991	5	2
Netherlands	1992	11	7
Netherlands	1993	6	4
Netherlands	1994	11	6
Netherlands	1995	5	1
Netherlands	1996	10	6
Netherlands	1997	5	4
Netherlands	1998	9	3
Netherlands	1999	5	1
Netherlands	2000	8	0
Total		79	37

Scores and results list Netherlands goal tally first, score column indicates score after each Bergkamp goal.

List of international goals scored by Dennis Bergkamp
No.	Date	Venue	Opponent	Score	Result	Competition
1	21 November 1990	De Kuip, Rotterdam, Netherlands	Greece	1–0	2–0	UEFA Euro 1992 qualifying
2	19 December 1990	Ta' Qali Stadium, Ta' Qali, Malta	Malta	5–0	8–0	UEFA Euro 1992 qualifying
3	19 December 1990	Ta' Qali Stadium, Ta' Qali, Malta	Malta	7–0	8–0	UEFA Euro 1992 qualifying
4	11 September 1991	Philips Stadion, Eindhoven, Netherlands	Poland	1–1	1–1	Friendly
5	4 December 1991	Kaftanzoglio Stadium, Thessaloniki, Greece	Greece	1–0	2–0	UEFA Euro 1992 qualifying
6	27 May 1992	Trendwork Arena, Sittard, Netherlands	Austria	2–0	3–2	Friendly
7	12 June 1992	Ullevi, Gothenburg, Sweden	Scotland	1–0	1–0	UEFA Euro 1992
8	18 June 1992	Ullevi, Gothenburg, Sweden	Germany	3–1	3–1	UEFA Euro 1992
9	22 June 1992	Ullevi, Gothenburg, Sweden	Denmark	1–1	2–2	UEFA Euro 1992
10	9 September 1992	Philips Stadion, Eindhoven, Netherlands	Italy	1–0	3–2	Friendly
11	9 September 1992	Philips Stadion, Eindhoven, Netherlands	Italy	2–0	3–2	Friendly
12	23 September 1992	Ullevaal, Oslo, Norway	Norway	1–1	1–2	1994 FIFA World Cup qualification
13	28 April 1993	Wembley Stadium, London, England	England	1–2	2–2	1994 FIFA World Cup qualification
14	13 October 1993	De Kuip, Rotterdam, Netherlands	England	2–0	2–0	1994 FIFA World Cup qualification
15	17 November 1993	Stadion Miejski, Poznań, Poland	Poland	1–0	3–1	1994 FIFA World Cup qualification
16	17 November 1993	Stadion Miejski, Poznań, Poland	Poland	2–1	3–1	1994 FIFA World Cup qualification
17	1 June 1994	Philips Stadion, Eindhoven, Netherlands	Hungary	1–1	7–1	Friendly
18	1 June 1994	Philips Stadion, Eindhoven, Netherlands	Hungary	7–1	7–1	Friendly
19	12 June 1994	Varsity Stadium, Toronto, Canada	Canada	1–0	3–0	Friendly
20	29 June 1994	Citrus Bowl, Orlando, United States	Morocco	1–0	2–1	1994 FIFA World Cup
21	4 July 1994	Citrus Bowl, Orlando, United States	Republic of Ireland	1–0	2–0	1994 FIFA World Cup
22	9 July 1994	Cotton Bowl, Dallas, United States	Brazil	1–2	2–3	1994 FIFA World Cup
23	29 March 1995	De Kuip, Rotterdam, Netherlands	Malta	2–0	4–0	UEFA Euro 1996 qualifying
24	4 June 1996	De Kuip, Rotterdam, Netherlands	Republic of Ireland	1–1	3–1	Friendly
25	13 June 1996	Villa Park, Birmingham, England	Switzerland	2–0	2–0	UEFA Euro 1996
26	9 November 1996	Philips Stadion, Eindhoven, Netherlands	Wales	1–0	7–1	1998 FIFA World Cup qualification
27	9 November 1996	Philips Stadion, Eindhoven, Netherlands	Wales	6–0	7–1	1998 FIFA World Cup qualification
28	9 November 1996	Philips Stadion, Eindhoven, Netherlands	Wales	7–1	7–1	1998 FIFA World Cup qualification
29	12 December 1996	King Baudouin Stadium, Brussels, Belgium	Belgium	1–0	3–0	1998 FIFA World Cup qualification
30	26 February 1997	Parc des Princes, Paris, France	France	1–0	1–2	Friendly
31	30 April 1997	Stadio Olimpico, Serravalle, San Marino	San Marino	1–0	6–0	1998 FIFA World Cup qualification
32	30 April 1997	Stadio Olimpico, Serravalle, San Marino	San Marino	6–0	6–0	1998 FIFA World Cup qualification
33	6 September 1997	Amsterdam ArenA, Amsterdam, Netherlands	Belgium	3–1	3–1	1998 FIFA World Cup qualification
34	20 June 1998	Stade Vélodrome, Marseille, France	South Korea	3–0	5–0	1998 FIFA World Cup
35	29 June 1998	Stade de Toulouse, Toulouse, France	FR Yugoslavia	1–0	2–1	1998 FIFA World Cup
36	4 July 1998	Stade Vélodrome, Marseille, France	Argentina	2–1	2–1	1998 FIFA World Cup
37	9 October 1999	Amsterdam Arena, Amsterdam, Netherlands	Brazil	1–0	2–2	Friendly

== Honours ==
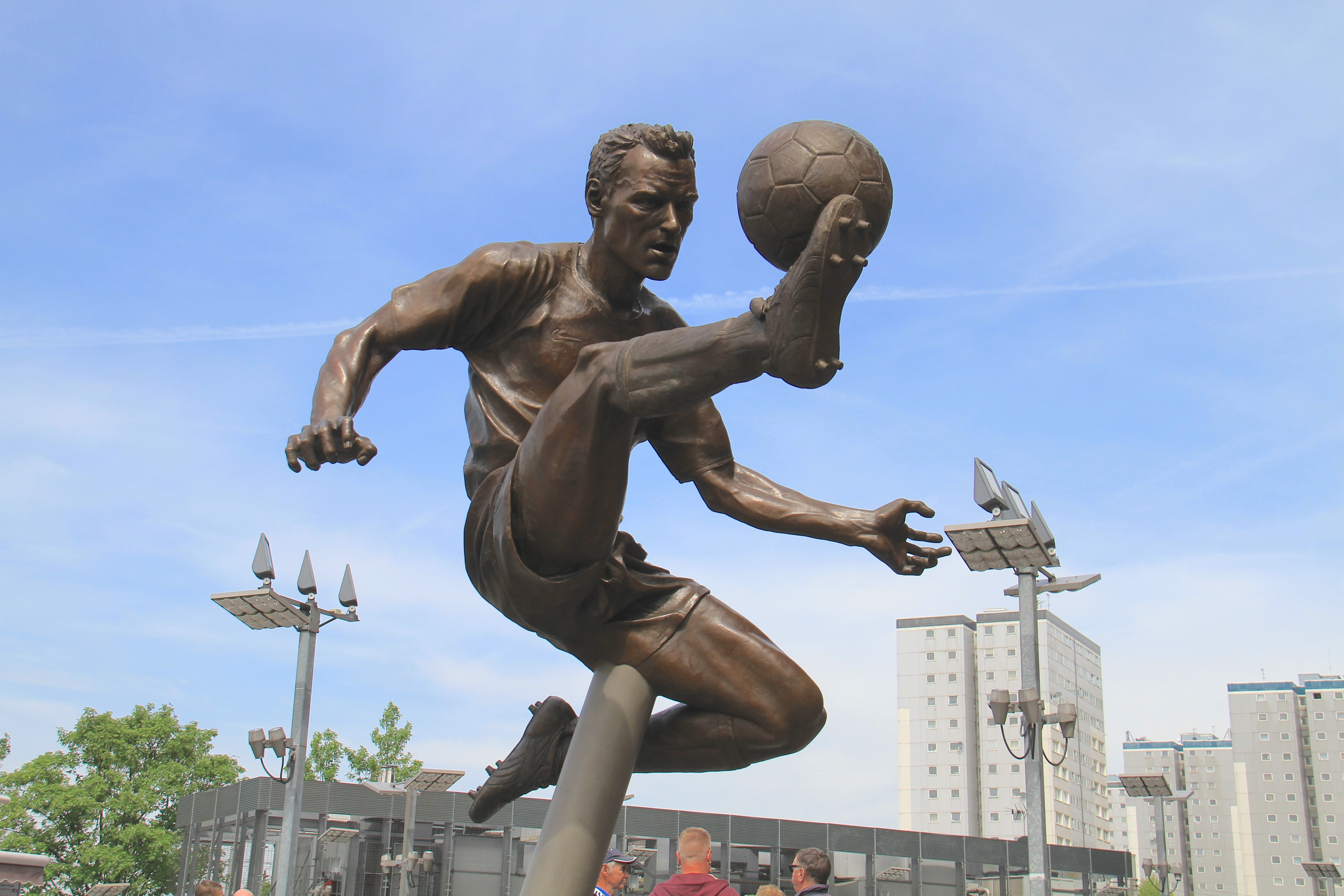
Bergkamp statue outside the Emirates Stadium

Ajax

- Eredivisie: 1989–90
- KNVB Cup: 1986–87, 1992–93
- European Cup Winners' Cup: 1986–87; runner-up: 1987–88
- UEFA Cup: 1991–92

Inter Milan

- UEFA Cup: 1993–94

Arsenal

- Premier League: 1997–98, 2001–02, 2003–04
- FA Cup: 1997–98,2001–02, 2002–03, 2004–05; runner-up: 2000–01
- FA Charity/Community Shield: 1998, 2002, 2004
- UEFA Champions League runner-up: 2005–06
- UEFA Cup runner-up: 1999–2000

Individual

- Dutch Football Talent of the Year: 1990
- Dutch Footballer of the Year: 1991, 1992
- Eredivisie top scorer: 1990–91, 1991–92, 1992–93
- UEFA European Championship Team of the Tournament: 1992
- UEFA European Championship Golden Boot: 1992 (joint)
- IFFHS World's Top Goal Scorer: 1992
- Ballon d'Or runner-up: 1993, third place: 1992, fourth place: 1997, eighth place: 1998, nominee: 1999, 2000
- FIFA World Player of the Year bronze award: 1993, 1997
- UEFA Cup top scorer: 1993–94
- Arsenal Player of the Season: 1996–97
- Most assists in the Premier League: 1998–99 (shared)
- Premier League Player of the Month: August 1997, September 1997, March 2002, February 2004
- PFA Team of the Year: 1997–98 Premier League
- FWA Footballer of the Year: 1997–98
- PFA Players' Player of the Year: 1997–98
- BBC Goal of the Season: 1997–98, 2001–02
- FIFA World Cup All-Star Team: 1998
- FIFA 100
- English Football Hall of Fame: 2007
- Premier League Hall of Fame: 2021
- FWA Tribute Award: 2025

== See also ==
- List of FIFA World Cup top goalscorers
