= Emst =

- Village
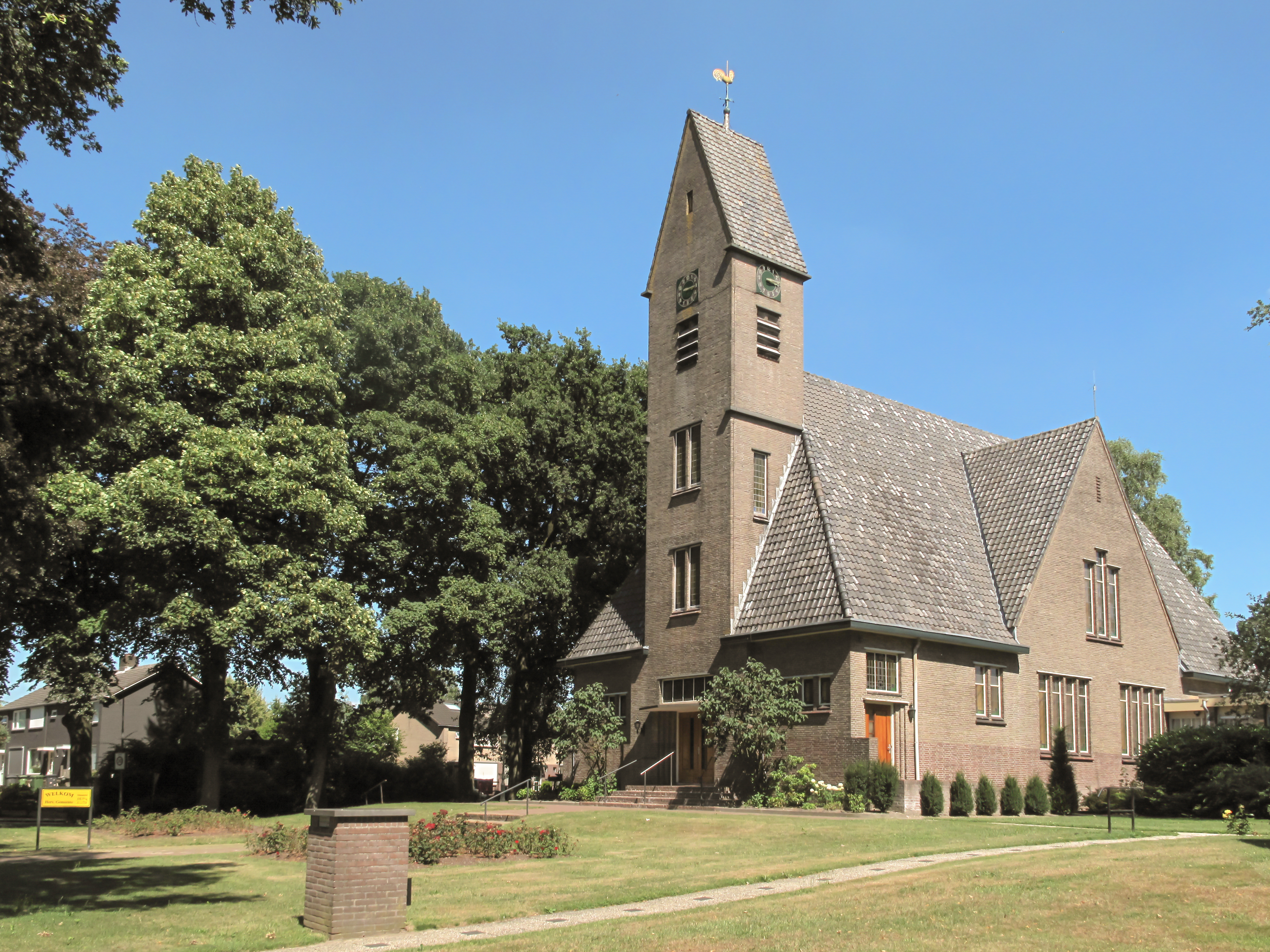
- Emst, reformed church

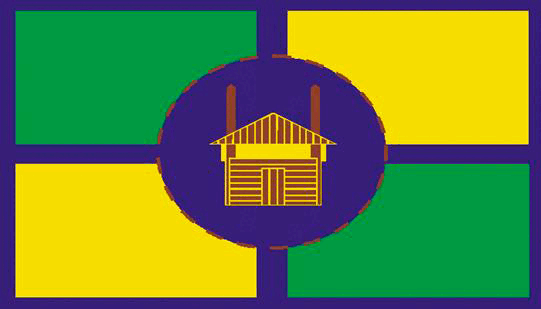
- Flag

- Location in the province of Gelderland Emst (Netherlands)
- Coordinates: 52°18′54″N 5°58′21″E
- Country: Netherlands
- Province: Gelderland
- Municipality: Epe

Area
  - Total: 39.24 km^{2} (15.15 sq mi)
- Elevation: 12 m (39 ft)

Population (2021)
  - Total: 3,225
  - Density: 82.19/km^{2} (212.9/sq mi)
- Time zone: UTC+1 (CET)
  - Summer (DST): UTC+2 (CEST)
- Postal code: 8166
- Dialing code: 0578

Emst is a village in the municipality of Epe in the province of Gelderland in the Netherlands. It is the birthplace of former footballer Marc Overmars. Emst is located in the forest area of Veluwe.

Emst was first mentioned between 1255 and 1256 as van Emze. The etymology is unknown. In 1860, it was home to 1,280 people. A Dutch Reformed Church was built in 1864. It burnt down in 1930, but was rebuilt the same year.

== Gallery ==
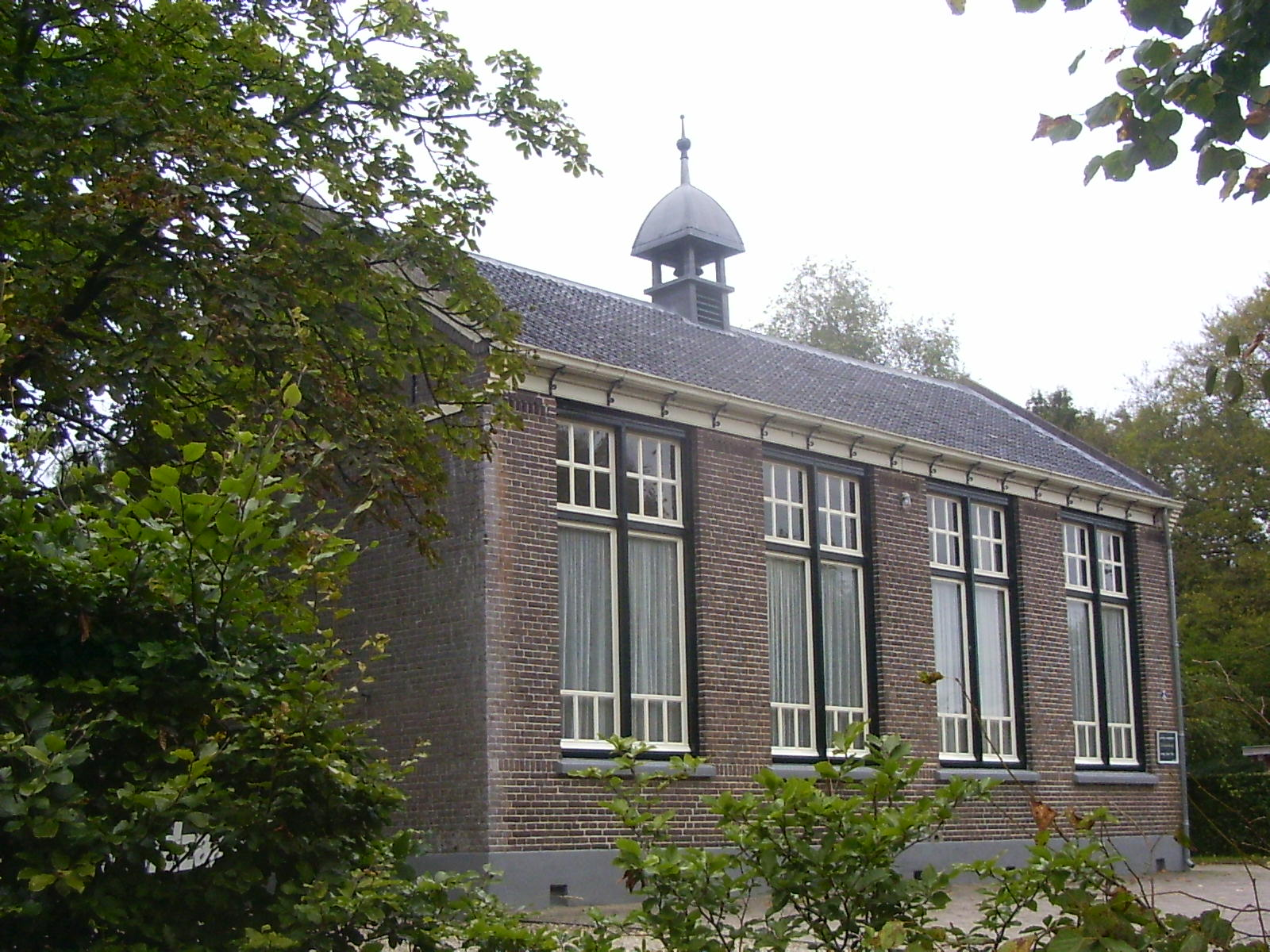
School in Emst

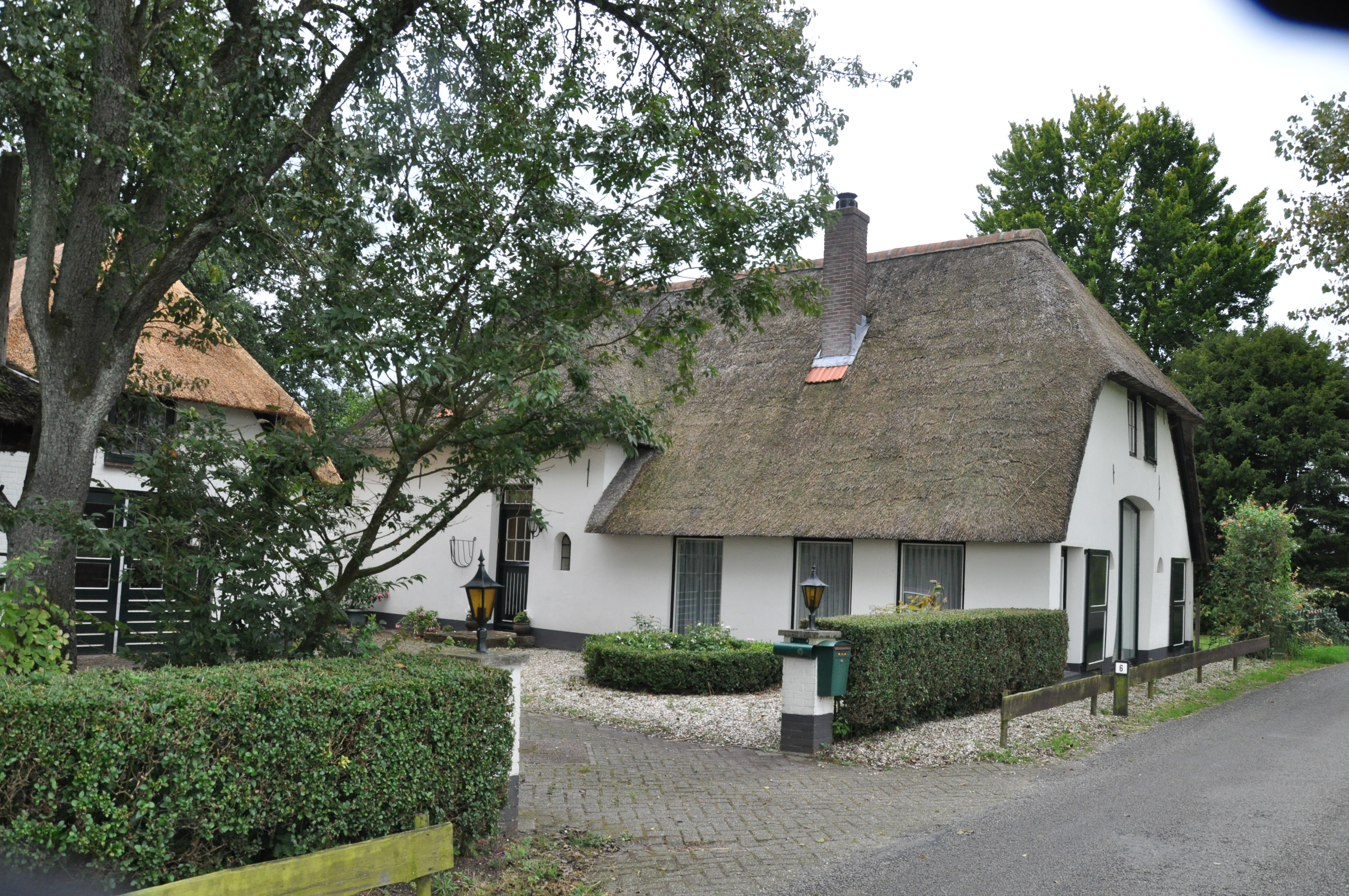
Farm

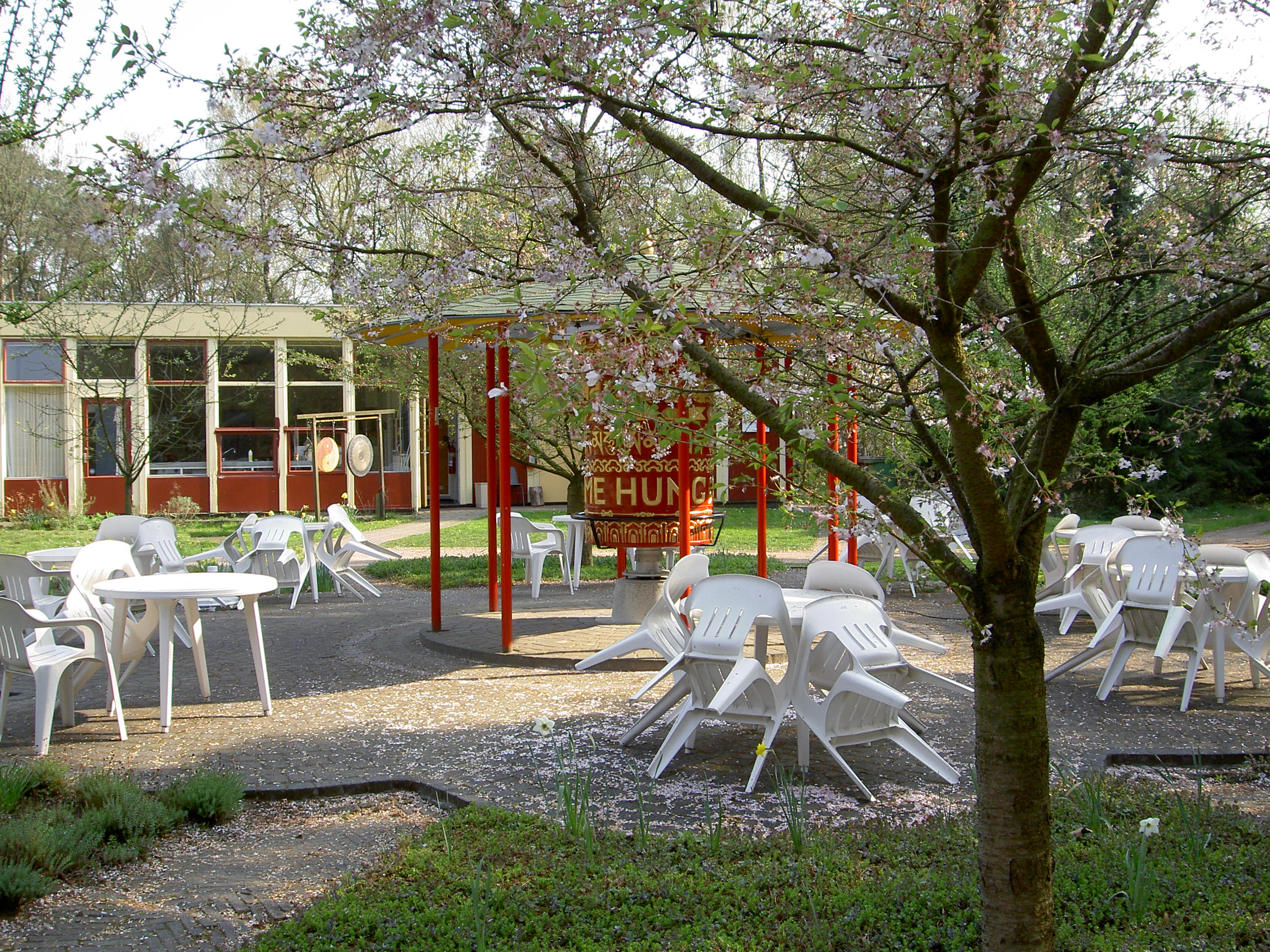
Maitreya Institute

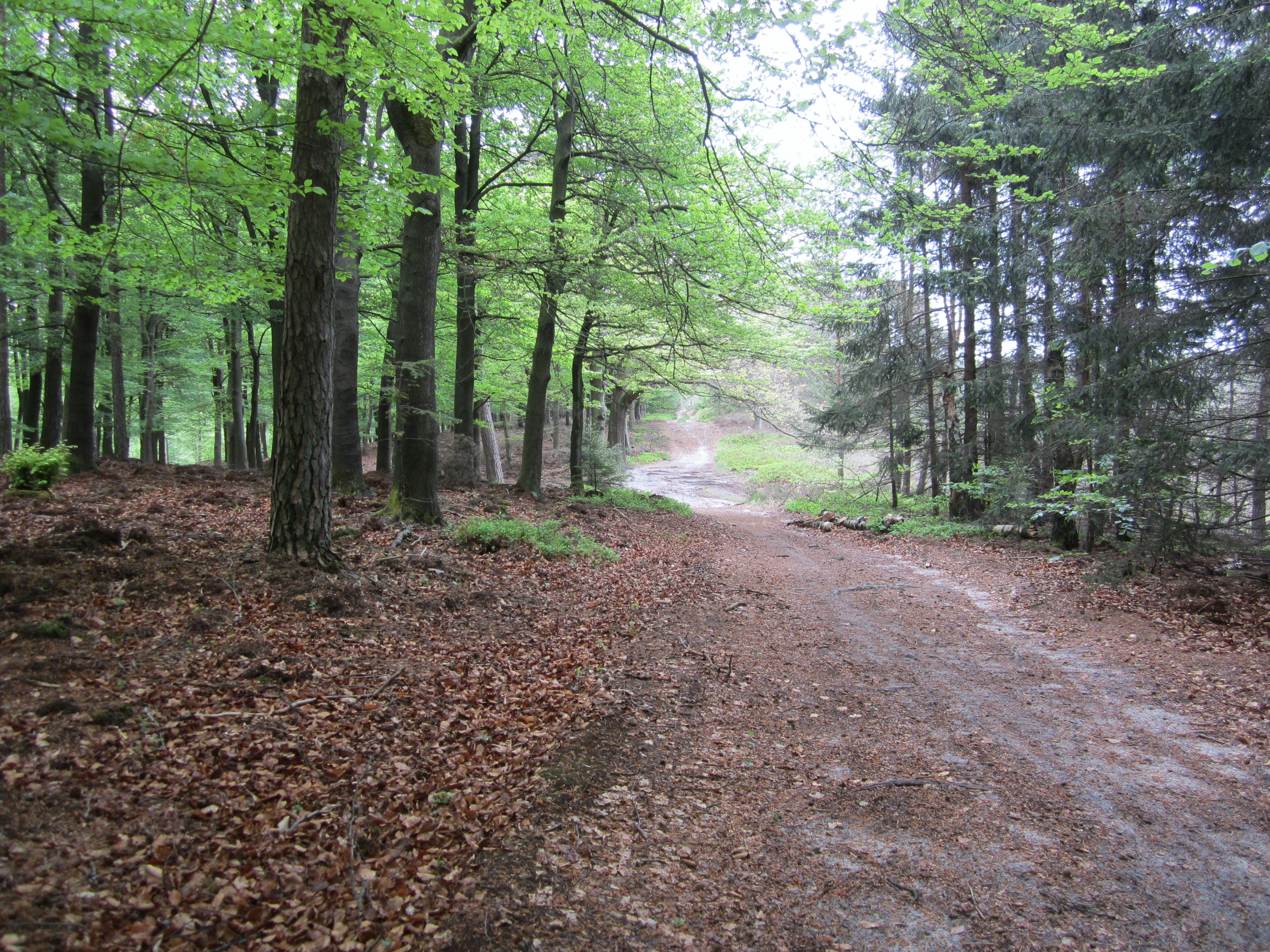
Forest near Emst
