= Netherlands at the FIFA World Cup =

International football delegation

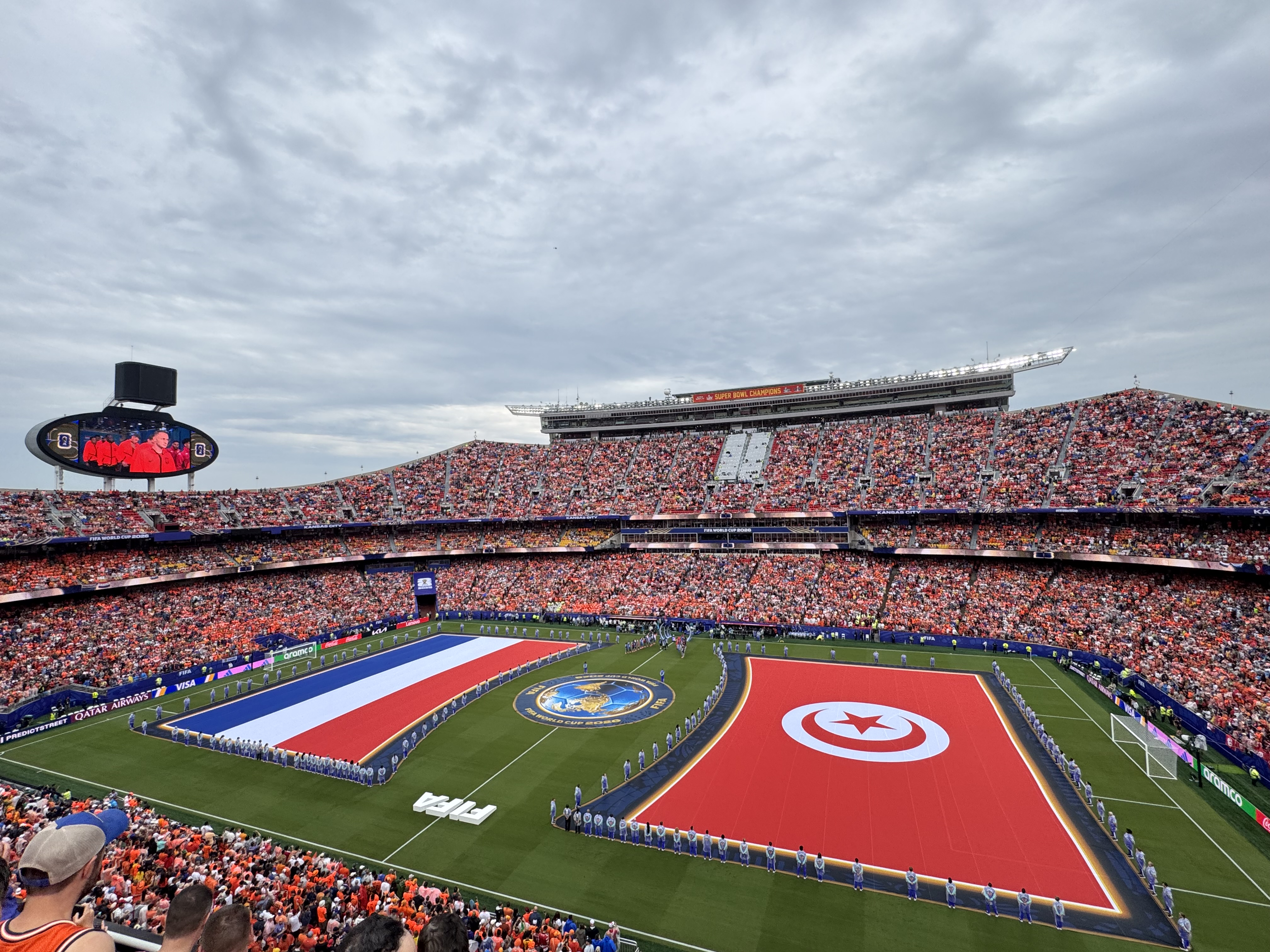
Pre-game national anthem ceremony between Netherlands and Tunisia, Group F play of the 2026 FIFA World Cup in Kansas City, Missouri.

The Netherlands have entered qualification for 20 of the 23 FIFA World Cup tournaments to date, qualifying 12 times. They have a record of three World Cup final appearances (as of 2026) without winning the tournament.

After losing two consecutive World Cup finals in 1974 and 1978, the team had their longest World Cup appearance streak in the 1990s, reaching three straight tournaments. In 1990, two years after winning the 1988 European Championship, the Dutch went out in the round of 16, defeated by West Germany. In 1994, the Netherlands was eliminated by Brazil in the quarter-finals, and in 1998 lost to Brazil in the semi-finals and Croatia in the match for third place. The Dutch returned in 2006, being eliminated by Portugal in the round of 16, a game known as the Battle of Nuremberg. In 2010, the team reached their third World Cup final, this time losing to Spain after extra time. The Dutch avenged this loss during the first match of the following 2014 World Cup, routing the Spanish 5–1, and eventually going on to record their first third-place finish. After missing the 2018 tournament, they returned in 2022, being eliminated in the quarter-final stage. In the following 2026 tournament, the Dutch had their worst ever finish, losing in the round of 32.

The Netherlands have never lost a World Cup match in regular time by more than one goal, and have not officially lost a match since the 2010 final, as their 2014, 2022, and 2026 campaigns all ended in defeat by way of penalty shoot-out, with the former two eliminations being to Argentina.

== Record at the FIFA World Cup ==
=== Overall record ===
Champions Runners-up Third place Hosts

FIFA World Cup record										Qualification record					
Year	Round	Position	Pld	W	D	L	GF	GA	Squad	Pld	W	D	L	GF	GA
(Uruguay) 1930	Did not enter									Did not enter					
(Italy) 1934	Round of 16	9th	1	0	0	1	2	3	Squad	2	2	0	0	9	4
(France) 1938	Round of 16	14th	1	0	0	1	0	3	Squad	2	1	1	0	5	1
(Brazil) 1950	Did not enter									Did not enter					
(Switzerland) 1954	Did not enter									Did not enter					
(Sweden) 1958	Did not qualify									4	2	1	1	12	7
(Chile) 1962	Did not qualify									3	0	2	1	4	7
(England) 1966	Did not qualify									6	2	2	2	6	4
(Mexico) 1970	Did not qualify									6	3	1	2	9	5
(West Germany) 1974	Runners-up	2nd	7	5	1	1	15	3	Squad	6	4	2	0	24	2
(Argentina) 1978	Runners-up	2nd	7	3	2	2	15	10	Squad	6	5	1	0	11	3
(Spain) 1982	Did not qualify									8	4	1	3	11	7
(Mexico) 1986	Did not qualify									8	4	1	3	13	7
(Italy) 1990	Round of 16	15th	4	0	3	1	3	4	Squad	6	4	2	0	8	2
(United States) 1994	Quarter-finals	7th	5	3	0	2	8	6	Squad	10	6	3	1	29	9
(France) 1998	Fourth place	4th	7	3	3	1	13	7	Squad	8	6	1	1	26	4
(South Korea) (Japan) 2002	Did not qualify									10	6	2	2	30	9
(Germany) 2006	Round of 16	11th	4	2	1	1	3	2	Squad	12	10	2	0	27	3
(South Africa) 2010	Runners-up	2nd	7	6	0	1	12	6	Squad	8	8	0	0	17	2
(Brazil) 2014	Third place	3rd	7	5	2	0	15	4	Squad	10	9	1	0	34	5
(Russia) 2018	Did not qualify									10	6	1	3	21	12
(Qatar) 2022	Quarter-finals	5th	5	3	2	0	10	4	Squad	10	7	2	1	33	8
(Canada) (Mexico) (United States) 2026	Round of 32	17th	4	2	2	0	11	5	Squad	8	6	2	0	27	4
(Morocco) (Portugal) (Spain) 2030	To be determined									To be determined					
(Saudi Arabia) 2034	To be determined									To be determined					
Total	Runners-up	12/23	58	32	16	11	109	57	—	143	95	28	20	356	105

Netherlands' World Cup record
First Match	Switzerland 3–2 Netherlands (27 May 1934; Milan, Italy)
Best Result	Runners-up in 1974, 1978 and 2010
Worst Result	First round in 1934 and 1938

=== By match ===
World Cup	Round	Opponent	Score	Result	Venue	Netherlands scorers
1934	Round of 16	Switzerland	2–3	L	Milan	K. Smit, L. Vente
1938	Round of 16	Czechoslovakia	0–3 (a.e.t.)	L	Le Havre	—
1974	Group 3	Uruguay	2–0	W	Hanover	J. Rep (2)
1974	Group 3	Sweden	0–0	D	Dortmund	—
1974	Group 3	Bulgaria	4–1	W	Dortmund	J. Neeskens (2), J. Rep, T. de Jong
1974	Group A	Argentina	4–0	W	Gelsenkirchen	J. Cruyff (2), R. Krol, J. Rep
1974	Group A	East Germany	2–0	W	Gelsenkirchen	J. Neeskens, R. Rensenbrink
1974	Group A	Brazil	2–0	W	Dortmund	J. Neeskens, J. Cruyff
1974	Final	West Germany	1–2	L	Munich	J. Neeskens
1978	Group 4	Iran	3–0	W	Mendoza	R. Rensenbrink (3)
1978	Group 4	Peru	0–0	D	Mendoza	—
1978	Group 4	Scotland	2–3	L	Mendoza	R. Rensenbrink, J. Rep
1978	Group A	Austria	5–1	W	Córdoba	J. Rep (2), E. Brandts, R. Rensenbrink, W. van de Kerkhof
1978	Group A	West Germany	2–2	D	Córdoba	A. Haan, R. van de Kerkhof
1978	Group A	Italy	2–1	W	Buenos Aires	E. Brandts, A. Haan
1978	Final	Argentina	1–3 (a.e.t.)	L	Buenos Aires	D. Nanninga
1990	Group F	Egypt	1–1	D	Palermo	W. Kieft
1990	Group F	England	0–0	D	Cagliari	—
1990	Group F	Republic of Ireland	1–1	D	Palermo	R. Gullit
1990	Round of 16	West Germany	1–2	L	Milan	R. Koeman
1994	Group F	Saudi Arabia	2–1	W	Washington, D.C.	W. Jonk, G. Taument
1994	Group F	Belgium	0–1	L	Orlando	—
1994	Group F	Morocco	2–1	W	Orlando	D. Bergkamp, B. Roy
1994	Round of 16	Republic of Ireland	2–0	W	Orlando	D. Bergkamp, W. Jonk
1994	Quarter-finals	Brazil	2–3	L	Dallas	D. Bergkamp, A. Winter
1998	Group E	Belgium	0–0	D	Saint-Denis	—
1998	Group E	South Korea	5–0	W	Marseille	P. Cocu, M. Overmars, D. Bergkamp, P. van Hooijdonk, R. de Boer
1998	Group E	Mexico	2–2	D	Saint-Étienne	P. Cocu, R. de Boer
1998	Round of 16	FR Yugoslavia	2–1	W	Toulouse	D. Bergkamp, E. Davids
1998	Quarter-finals	Argentina	2–1	W	Marseille	P. Kluivert, D. Bergkamp
1998	Semi-finals	Brazil	1–1 (a.e.t.) (2–4 p)	D	Marseille	P. Kluivert
1998	Match for third place	Croatia	1–2	L	Paris	B. Zenden
2006	Group C	Serbia and Montenegro	1–0	W	Leipzig	A. Robben
2006	Group C	Ivory Coast	2–1	W	Stuttgart	R. van Persie, R. van Nistelrooy
2006	Group C	Argentina	0–0	D	Frankfurt	—
2006	Round of 16	Portugal	0–1	L	Nuremberg	—
2010	Group E	Denmark	2–0	W	Johannesburg	D. Agger (o.g.), D. Kuyt
2010	Group E	Japan	1–0	W	Durban	W. Sneijder
2010	Group E	Cameroon	2–1	W	Cape Town	R. van Persie, K. Huntelaar
2010	Round of 16	Slovakia	2–1	W	Durban	A. Robben, W. Sneijder
2010	Quarter-finals	Brazil	2–1	W	Port Elizabeth	W. Sneijder (2)
2010	Semi-finals	Uruguay	3–2	W	Cape Town	G. van Bronckhorst, W. Sneijder, A. Robben
2010	Final	Spain	0–1 (a.e.t.)	L	Johannesburg	—
2014	Group B	Spain	5–1	W	Salvador	R. van Persie (2), A. Robben (2), S. de Vrij
2014	Group B	Australia	3–2	W	Porto Alegre	A. Robben, R. van Persie, M. Depay
2014	Group B	Chile	2–0	W	São Paulo	L. Fer, M. Depay
2014	Round of 16	Mexico	2–1	W	Fortaleza	W. Sneijder, K. Huntelaar
2014	Quarter-finals	Costa Rica	0–0 (a.e.t.) (4–3 p)	D	Salvador	—
2014	Semi-finals	Argentina	0–0 (a.e.t.) (2–4 p)	D	São Paulo	—
2014	Match for third place	Brazil	3–0	W	Brasília	R. van Persie, D. Blind, G. Wijnaldum
2022	Group A	Senegal	2–0	W	Doha	C. Gakpo, D. Klaassen
2022	Group A	Ecuador	1–1	D	Al Rayyan	C. Gakpo
2022	Group A	Qatar	2–0	W	Al Khor	C. Gakpo, F. de Jong
2022	Round of 16	United States	3–1	W	Al Rayyan	M. Depay, D. Blind, D. Dumfries
2022	Quarter-finals	Argentina	2–2 (a.e.t.) (3–4 p)	D	Lusail	W. Weghorst (2)
2026	Group F	Japan	2–2	D	Arlington	V. van Dijk, C. Summerville
2026	Group F	Sweden	5–1	W	Houston	B. Brobbey (2), C. Gakpo (2), C. Summerville
2026	Group F	Tunisia	3–1	W	Kansas City	E. Skhiri (o.g.), B. Brobbey, J. van Hecke
2026	Round of 32	Morocco	1–1 (a.e.t.) (2–3 p)	D	Guadalupe	C. Gakpo

=== Record by opponent ===
FIFA World Cup matches (by team)
Opponent	Total	Wins	Draws	Losses	Goals Scored	Goals Conceded
Argentina	6	2	3	1	9	6
Brazil	5	3	1	1	10	5
West Germany	3	0	1	2	4	6
Belgium	2	0	1	1	0	1
Japan	2	1	1	0	3	2
Mexico	2	1	1	0	4	3
Morocco	2	1	1	0	3	2
Republic of Ireland	2	1	1	0	3	1
Spain	2	1	0	1	5	2
Sweden	2	1	1	0	5	1
Uruguay	2	2	0	0	5	2
Australia	1	1	0	0	3	2
Austria	1	1	0	0	5	1
Bulgaria	1	1	0	0	4	1
Cameroon	1	1	0	0	2	1
Chile	1	1	0	0	2	0
Costa Rica	1	0	1	0	0	0
Croatia	1	0	0	1	1	2
Czechoslovakia	1	0	0	1	0	3
Denmark	1	1	0	0	2	0
East Germany	1	1	0	0	2	0
England	1	0	1	0	0	0
Ecuador	1	0	1	0	1	1
Egypt	1	0	1	0	1	1
FR Yugoslavia	1	1	0	0	2	1
Iran	1	1	0	0	3	0
Italy	1	1	0	0	2	1
Ivory Coast	1	1	0	0	2	1
Peru	1	0	1	0	0	0
Portugal	1	0	0	1	0	1
Qatar	1	1	0	0	2	0
Saudi Arabia	1	1	0	0	2	1
Scotland	1	0	0	1	2	3
Senegal	1	1	0	0	2	0
Serbia and Montenegro	1	1	0	0	1	0
Slovakia	1	1	0	0	2	1
South Korea	1	1	0	0	5	0
Switzerland	1	0	0	1	2	3
Tunisia	1	1	0	0	3	1
United States	1	1	0	0	3	1

== Participations ==
=== Italy 1934 ===
27 May 1934
16:30 CEST (UTC+02)

Switzerland	3–2	Netherlands
Kielholz 7', 43'; Abegglen 69'	Report	Smit 19'; Vente 84'

Stadio San Siro, Milan
Attendance: ~40,000
Referee: Ivan Eklind (Sweden)

=== France 1938 ===
5 June 1938
18:30 WEST (UTC+01)

Czechoslovakia	3–0 (a.e.t.)	Netherlands
Košťálek 93'; Nejedlý 111'; Zeman 118'	Report

Stade de la Cavée Verte, Le Havre
Attendance: 11,000
Referee: Lucien Leclerq (France)

=== West Germany 1974 ===
Team	Pld	W	D	L	GF	GA	GD	Pts
Netherlands	3	2	1	0	6	1	+5	5
Sweden	3	1	2	0	3	0	+3	4
Bulgaria	3	0	2	1	2	5	−3	2
Uruguay	3	0	1	2	1	6	−5	1

15 June 1974
16:00 CET

Uruguay	0–2	Netherlands
	Report	Rep 16', 86'

Niedersachsenstadion, Hanover
Attendance: 53,700
Referee: Károly Palotai (Hungary)

19 June 1974
19:30 CET

Netherlands	0–0	Sweden
	Report

Westfalenstadion, Dortmund
Attendance: 53,700
Referee: Werner Winsemann (Canada)

23 June 1974
16:00 CET

Netherlands	4–1	Bulgaria
Neeskens 5' (pen.), 44' (pen.); Rep 71' de Jong 88'	Report	Krol 78' (o.g.)

Westfalenstadion, Dortmund
Attendance: 52,100
Referee: Tony Boskovic (Australia)

==== Round 2 ====
Team	Pld	W	D	L	GF	GA	GD	Pts
Netherlands	3	3	0	0	8	0	+8	6
Brazil	3	2	0	1	3	3	0	4
East Germany	3	0	1	2	1	4	−3	1
Argentina	3	0	1	2	2	7	−5	1

26 June 1974
19:30 CET

Netherlands	4–0	Argentina
Cruijff 11', 90'; Krol 25'; Rep 73'	Report

Parkstadion, Gelsenkirchen
Attendance: 55,348
Referee: Bob Davidson (Scotland)

30 June 1974
16:00 CET

East Germany	0–2	Netherlands
	Report	Neeskens 13'; Rensenbrink 59'

Parkstadion, Gelsenkirchen
Attendance: 67,148
Referee: Rudolf Scheurer (Switzerland)

3 July 1974
19:30 CET

Netherlands	2–0	Brazil
Neeskens 50'; Cruijff 65'	Report

Westfalenstadion, Dortmund
Attendance: 52,500
Referee: Kurt Tschenscher (West Germany)

==== Final ====
7 July 1974
16:00 CET

Netherlands	1–2	West Germany
Neeskens 2' (pen.)	Report	Breitner 25' (pen.); Müller 43'

Olympiastadion, Munich
Attendance: 75,200
Referee: Jack Taylor (England)

=== Argentina 1978 ===
Team	Pld	W	D	L	GF	GA	GD	Pts
Peru	3	2	1	0	7	2	+5	5
Netherlands	3	1	1	1	5	3	+2	3
Scotland	3	1	1	1	5	6	−1	3
Iran	3	0	1	2	2	8	−6	1

3 June 1978
16:45 ART

Netherlands	3–0	Iran
Rensenbrink 40' (pen.), 62', 78' (pen.)	Report

Estadio Ciudad de Mendoza, Mendoza
Attendance: 33,431
Referee: Alfonso González Archundia (Mexico)

7 June 1978
16:45 ART

Netherlands	0–0	Peru
	Report

Estadio Ciudad de Mendoza, Mendoza
Attendance: 28,125
Referee: Adolf Prokop (East Germany)

11 June 1978
16:45 ART

Scotland	3–2	Netherlands
Dalglish 44'; Gemmill 46' (pen.), 68'	Report	Rensenbrink 34' (pen.); Rep 71'

Estadio Ciudad de Mendoza, Mendoza
Attendance: 35,130
Referee: Erich Linemayr (Austria)

==== Round 2 ====
Team	Pld	W	D	L	GF	GA	GD	Pts
Netherlands	3	2	1	0	9	4	+5	5
Italy	3	1	1	1	2	2	0	3
West Germany	3	0	2	1	4	5	−1	2
Austria	3	1	0	2	4	8	−4	2

14 June 1978
13:45 ART

Austria	1–5	Netherlands
Obermayer 80'	Report	Brandts 6'; Rensenbrink 35' (pen.); Rep 36', 53'; W. van de Kerkhof 82'

Estadio Chateau Carreras, Córdoba
Attendance: 25,050
Referee: John Gordon (Scotland)

18 June 1978
16:45 ART

Netherlands	2–2	West Germany
Haan 27'; R. van de Kerkhof 82'	Report	Abramczik 3'; D. Müller 70'

Estadio Chateau Carreras, Córdoba
Attendance: 40,750
Referee: Ramón Barreto (Uruguay)

21 June 1978
13:45 ART

Italy	1–2	Netherlands
Brandts 19' (o.g.)	Report	Brandts 49'; Haan 76'

Estadio Monumental, Buenos Aires
Attendance: 67,433
Referee: Angel Franco Martínez (Spain)

==== Final ====
25 June 1978
15:00 ART

Netherlands	1–3 (a.e.t.)	Argentina
Nanninga 82'	Report	Kempes 37', 104'; Bertoni 115'

Estadio Monumental, Buenos Aires
Attendance: 71,483
Referee: Sergio Gonella (Italy)

=== Italy 1990 ===
Team	Pld	W	D	L	GF	GA	GD	Pts
England	3	1	2	0	2	1	+1	4
Republic of Ireland	3	0	3	0	2	2	0	3
Netherlands	3	0	3	0	2	2	0	3
Egypt	3	0	2	1	1	2	−1	2

June 12, 1990
21:00

Netherlands	1–1	Egypt
Kieft 58'		Abdelghani 83' (pen.)

Stadio La Favorita, Palermo
Attendance: 33,421
Referee: Aladrén (Spain)

June 16, 1990
21:00

England	0–0	Netherlands

Stadio Sant'Elia, Cagliari
Attendance: 35,267
Referee: Petrović (Yugoslavia)

June 21, 1990
21:00

Netherlands	1–1	Republic of Ireland
Gullit 10'		Quinn 71'

Stadio La Favorita, Palermo
Attendance: 33,288
Referee: Vautrot (France)

==== Round of 16 ====
24 June 1990
21:00

West Germany	2–1	Netherlands
Klinsmann 51'; Brehme 82'	Report	R. Koeman 89' (pen.)

San Siro, Milan
Attendance: 74,559
Referee: Juan Carlos Loustau (Argentina)

=== United States 1994 ===
==== Group stage ====
Pos	Team	Pld	W	D	L	GF	GA	GD	Pts	Qualification
1	Netherlands	3	2	0	1	4	3	+1	6 (Note: Head-to-head result: Netherlands 2–1 Saudi Arabia.)	Advance to knockout stage
2	Saudi Arabia	3	2	0	1	4	3	+1	6	Advance to knockout stage
3	Belgium	3	2	0	1	2	1	+1	6	Advance to knockout stage
4	Morocco	3	0	0	3	2	5	−3	0	

Source: FIFA
Notes:
20 June 1994
19:35 EDT

Netherlands	2–1	Saudi Arabia
Jonk 50'; Taument 86'	Report	Amin 18'

RFK Stadium, Washington
Attendance: 50,535
Referee: Manuel Diaz Vega (Spain)

25 June 1994
12:35 EDT

Belgium	1–0	Netherlands
Albert 65'	Report

Citrus Bowl, Orlando
Attendance: 62,387
Referee: Renato Marsiglia (Brazil)

29 June 1994
12:35 EDT

Morocco	1–2	Netherlands
Nader 47'	Report	Bergkamp 43'; Roy 77'

Citrus Bowl, Orlando
Attendance: 60,578
Referee: Alberto Tejada Noriega (Peru)

==== Knockout stage ====
Round of 16

4 July 1994
12:05 EDT

Netherlands	2–0	Republic of Ireland
Bergkamp 11'; Jonk 41'	Report

Citrus Bowl, Orlando
Attendance: 61,355
Referee: Peter Mikkelsen (Denmark)

Quarter-finals

9 July 1994
14:35 CDT

Netherlands	2–3	Brazil
Bergkamp 64'; Winter 76'	Report	Romário 53'; Bebeto 63'; Branco 81'

Cotton Bowl, Dallas
Attendance: 63,500
Referee: Rodrigo Badilla (Costa Rica)

=== France 1998 ===
==== Group stage ====
Pos	Team	Pld	W	D	L	GF	GA	GD	Pts	Qualification
1	Netherlands	3	1	2	0	7	2	+5	5	Advance to knockout stage
2	Mexico	3	1	2	0	7	5	+2	5	Advance to knockout stage
3	Belgium	3	0	3	0	3	3	0	3	
4	South Korea	3	0	1	2	2	9	−7	1	

Source: FIFA
13 June 1998
21:00

Netherlands	0–0	Belgium
	(Report)

Stade de France, Saint-Denis
Attendance: 75,000
Referee: Pierluigi Collina (Italy)

20 June 1998
21:00

Netherlands	5–0	South Korea
Cocu 38'; Overmars 42'; Bergkamp 71' van Hooijdonk 80'; R. de Boer 83'	(Report)

Stade Vélodrome, Marseille
Attendance: 55,000
Referee: Ryszard Wójcik (Poland)

25 June 1998
16:00

Netherlands	2–2	Mexico
Cocu 4'; R. de Boer 18'	(Report)	Peláez 75'; Hernández 90+5'

Stade Geoffroy-Guichard, Saint-Étienne
Attendance: 30,600
Referee: Abdul Rahman Al-Zeid (Saudi Arabia)

==== Knockout stage ====
Round of 16

29 June 1998
21:00

Netherlands	2–1	FR Yugoslavia
Bergkamp 38'; Davids 90+2'	(Report)	Komljenović 48'

Stade de Toulouse, Toulouse
Attendance: 33,500
Referee: José Garcia Aranda (Spain)

Quarter-finals

4 July 1998
16:30

Netherlands	2–1	Argentina
Kluivert 12'; Bergkamp 89'	(Report)	López 18'

Stade Vélodrome, Marseille
Attendance: 55,000
Referee: Arturo Brizio Carter (Mexico)

Semi-final

7 July 1998
21:00

Brazil	1–1 (a.e.t.)	Netherlands
Ronaldo 46'	(Report)	Kluivert 87'
Penalties
Ronaldo (penalty scored); Rivaldo (penalty scored); Emerson (penalty scored); Dunga (penalty scored)	4–2	(penalty scored) F. de Boer; (penalty scored) Bergkamp; (penalty missed) Cocu; (penalty missed) R. de Boer

Stade Vélodrome, Marseille
Attendance: 54,000
Referee: Ali Bujsaim (United Arab Emirates)

Match for third place

11 July 1998
21:00

Netherlands	1–2	Croatia
Zenden 21'	(Report)	Prosinečki 13'; Šuker 35'

Parc des Princes, Paris
Attendance: 45,500
Referee: Epifanio González (Paraguay)

=== Germany 2006 ===
==== Group stage ====
Pos	Team	Pld	W	D	L	GF	GA	GD	Pts	Qualification
1	Argentina	3	2	1	0	8	1	+7	7	Advance to knockout stage
2	Netherlands	3	2	1	0	3	1	+2	7	Advance to knockout stage
3	Ivory Coast	3	1	0	2	5	6	−1	3	
4	Serbia and Montenegro	3	0	0	3	2	10	−8	0	

Source: FIFA
Rules for classification: Tie-breaking criteria
11 June 2006
15:00

Serbia and Montenegro	0–1	Netherlands
	(Report)	Robben 18'

Zentralstadion, Leipzig
Attendance: 43,000
Referee: Markus Merk (Germany)

16 June 2006
18:00

Netherlands	2–1	Ivory Coast
van Persie 23' van Nistelrooy 27'	(Report)	B. Koné 39'

Gottlieb-Daimler-Stadion, Stuttgart
Attendance: 52,000
Referee: Óscar Ruiz (Colombia)

21 June 2006
21:00

Netherlands	0–0	Argentina
	(Report)

FIFA WM Stadion Frankfurt, Frankfurt
Attendance: 48,000
Referee: Luis Medina Cantalejo (Spain)

==== Knockout stage ====
Round of 16

25 June 2006
21:00

Portugal	1–0	Netherlands
Maniche 23'	(Report)

Frankenstadion, Nuremberg
Attendance: 41,000
Referee: Valentin Ivanov (Russia)

=== South Africa 2010 ===
==== Group stage ====
Pos	Team	Pld	W	D	L	GF	GA	GD	Pts	Qualification
1	Netherlands	3	3	0	0	5	1	+4	9	Advance to knockout stage
2	Japan	3	2	0	1	4	2	+2	6	Advance to knockout stage
3	Denmark	3	1	0	2	3	6	−3	3	
4	Cameroon	3	0	0	3	2	5	−3	0	

Source: FIFA
Rules for classification: Tie-breaking criteria
14 June 2010
13:30

Netherlands	2–0	Denmark
Agger 46' (o.g.); Kuyt 85'	Report

Soccer City, Johannesburg
Attendance: 83,465
Referee: Stéphane Lannoy (France)

19 June 2010
13:30

Netherlands	1–0	Japan
Sneijder 53'	Report

Moses Mabhida Stadium, Durban
Attendance: 62,010
Referee: Héctor Baldassi (Argentina)

24 June 2010
20:30

Cameroon	1–2	Netherlands
Eto'o 65' (pen.)	Report	Van Persie 36'; Huntelaar 83'

Cape Town Stadium, Cape Town
Attendance: 63,093
Referee: Pablo Pozo (Chile)

==== Knockout stage ====
Round of 16

28 June 2010
16:00

Netherlands	2–1	Slovakia
Robben 18'; Sneijder 84'	Report	Vittek 90+4' (pen.)

Moses Mabhida Stadium, Durban
Attendance: 61,962
Referee: Alberto Undiano Mallenco (Spain)

Quarter-finals

2 July 2010
16:00

Netherlands	2–1	Brazil
Sneijder 53', 68'	Report	Robinho 10'

Nelson Mandela Bay Stadium, Port Elizabeth
Attendance: 40,186
Referee: Yuichi Nishimura (Japan)

Semi-final

6 July 2010
20:30

Uruguay	2–3	Netherlands
Forlán 41'; M. Pereira 90+2'	Report	Van Bronckhorst 18'; Sneijder 69'; Robben 72'

Cape Town Stadium, Cape Town
Attendance: 62,479
Referee: Ravshan Irmatov (Uzbekistan)

Final

11 July 2010
20:30

Netherlands	0–1 (a.e.t.)	Spain
		Iniesta 116'

Soccer City, Johannesburg
Attendance: 84,490
Referee: Howard Webb (England)

Netherlands	Spain

GK	1	Maarten Stekelenburg
RB	2	Gregory van der Wiel	(yellow card) 111'
CB	3	John Heitinga	(yellow card) 57' (yellow-red card) 109'
CB	4	Joris Mathijsen	(yellow card) 117'
LB	5	Giovanni van Bronckhorst (c)	(yellow card) 54'	(substituted off) 105'
CM	6	Mark van Bommel	(yellow card) 22'
CM	8	Nigel de Jong	(yellow card) 28'	(substituted off) 99'
RW	11	Arjen Robben	(yellow card) 84'
AM	10	Wesley Sneijder
LW	7	Dirk Kuyt		(substituted off) 71'
CF	9	Robin van Persie	(yellow card) 15'
Substitutions:
MF	17	Eljero Elia		(substituted on) 71'
MF	23	Rafael van der Vaart		(substituted on) 99'
DF	15	Edson Braafheid		(substituted on) 105'
Manager:
Bert van Marwijk

GK	1	Iker Casillas (c)
RB	15	Sergio Ramos	(yellow card) 23'
CB	3	Gerard Piqué
CB	5	Carles Puyol	(yellow card) 16'
LB	11	Joan Capdevila	(yellow card) 67'
DM	16	Sergio Busquets
DM	14	Xabi Alonso		(substituted off) 87'
CM	8	Xavi	(yellow card) 120+1'
RW	6	Andrés Iniesta	(yellow card) 118'
LW	18	Pedro		(substituted off) 60'
CF	7	David Villa		(substituted off) 106'
Substitutions:
MF	22	Jesús Navas		(substituted on) 60'
MF	10	Cesc Fàbregas		(substituted on) 87'
FW	9	Fernando Torres		(substituted on) 106'
Manager:
Vicente del Bosque

Man of the Match:
Andrés Iniesta (Spain)

Assistant referees:
Darren Cann (England)
Michael Mullarkey (England)
Fourth official:
Yuichi Nishimura (Japan)
Fifth official:
Toru Sagara (Japan)

=== Brazil 2014 ===
Netherlands used all 23 players during the 2014 World Cup, making it the first team in World Cup history to ever use all of its squad players. The team avenged their 2010 loss to Spain by defeating the defending champions with a stunning 5–1 victory in their opening game. They went on to achieve their first third place in any World Cup.

==== Group stage ====
Pos	Team	Pld	W	D	L	GF	GA	GD	Pts	Qualification
1	Netherlands	3	3	0	0	10	3	+7	9	Advance to knockout stage
2	Chile	3	2	0	1	5	3	+2	6	Advance to knockout stage
3	Spain	3	1	0	2	4	7	−3	3	
4	Australia	3	0	0	3	3	9	−6	0	

Source: FIFA
Rules for classification: Tie-breaking criteria
- Group winner advance to play runner-up of Group A in the round of 16
- Group runner-up advance to play winner of Group A in the round of 16
13 June 2014
16:00 UTC−3

Spain	1–5	Netherlands
Alonso 27' (pen.)	Report	Van Persie 44', 72'; Robben 53', 80'; De Vrij 65'

Arena Fonte Nova, Salvador
Attendance: 48,173
Referee: Nicola Rizzoli (Italy)

Spain	Netherlands

GK	1	Iker Casillas (c)	(yellow card) 65'
RB	22	César Azpilicueta
CB	3	Gerard Piqué
CB	15	Sergio Ramos
LB	18	Jordi Alba
RM	8	Xavi
CM	16	Sergio Busquets
LM	14	Xabi Alonso		(substituted off) 62'
RW	21	David Silva		(substituted off) 78'
LW	6	Andrés Iniesta
CF	19	Diego Costa		(substituted off) 62'
Substitutions:
FW	9	Fernando Torres		(substituted on) 62'
FW	11	Pedro		(substituted on) 62'
MF	10	Cesc Fàbregas		(substituted on) 78'
Manager:
Vicente del Bosque

GK	1	Jasper Cillessen
RB	2	Ron Vlaar
CB	3	Stefan de Vrij	(yellow card) 41'	(substituted off) 77'
LB	4	Bruno Martins Indi
RWB	7	Daryl Janmaat
LWB	5	Daley Blind
CM	6	Nigel de Jong
CM	8	Jonathan de Guzmán	(yellow card) 25'	(substituted off) 62'
AM	10	Wesley Sneijder
CF	9	Robin van Persie (c)	(yellow card) 66'	(substituted off) 79'
CF	11	Arjen Robben
Substitutions:
MF	20	Georginio Wijnaldum		(substituted on) 62'
DF	13	Joël Veltman		(substituted on) 77'
FW	17	Jeremain Lens		(substituted on) 79'
Manager:
Louis van Gaal

Man of the Match:
Robin van Persie (Netherlands)

Assistant referees:
Renato Faverani (Italy)
Andrea Stefani (Italy)
Fourth official:
Svein Oddvar Moen (Norway)
Fifth official:
Kim Thomas Haglund (Norway)

18 June 2014
13:00 UTC−3

Australia	2–3	Netherlands
Cahill 21'; Jedinak 54' (pen.)	Report	Robben 20'; Van Persie 58'; Depay 68'

Estádio Beira-Rio, Porto Alegre
Attendance: 42,877
Referee: Djamel Haimoudi (Algeria)

Australia	Netherlands

GK	1	Mathew Ryan
RB	19	Ryan McGowan
CB	22	Alex Wilkinson
CB	6	Matthew Špiranović
LB	3	Jason Davidson
CM	15	Mile Jedinak (c)
CM	17	Matt McKay
RW	7	Mathew Leckie
AM	23	Mark Bresciano		(substituted off) 51'
LW	11	Tommy Oar		(substituted off) 77'
CF	4	Tim Cahill	(yellow card) 43'	(substituted off) 69'
Substitutions:
MF	13	Oliver Bozanić		(substituted on) 51'
MF	10	Ben Halloran		(substituted on) 69'
FW	9	Adam Taggart		(substituted on) 77'
Manager:
Ange Postecoglou

GK	1	Jasper Cillessen
RB	2	Ron Vlaar
CB	3	Stefan de Vrij
LB	4	Bruno Martins Indi		(substituted off) 45+3'
RM	7	Daryl Janmaat
CM	8	Jonathan de Guzmán		(substituted off) 78'
CM	6	Nigel de Jong
LM	5	Daley Blind
AM	10	Wesley Sneijder
CF	9	Robin van Persie (c)	(yellow card) 47'	(substituted off) 87'
CF	11	Arjen Robben
Substitutions:
MF	21	Memphis Depay		(substituted on) 45+3'
MF	20	Georginio Wijnaldum		(substituted on) 78'
FW	17	Jeremain Lens		(substituted on) 87'
Manager:
Louis van Gaal

Man of the Match:
Arjen Robben (Netherlands)

Assistant referees:
Abdelhak Etchiali (Algeria)
Redouane Achik (Morocco)
Fourth official:
Bakary Gassama (Gambia)
Fifth official:
Evarist Menkouande (Cameroon)

23 June 2014
13:00 UTC−3

Netherlands	2–0	Chile
Fer 77'; Depay 90+2'	Report

Arena de São Paulo, São Paulo
Attendance: 62,996
Referee: Bakary Gassama (Gambia)

Netherlands	Chile

GK	1	Jasper Cillessen
RB	7	Daryl Janmaat
CB	2	Ron Vlaar
CB	3	Stefan de Vrij
LB	5	Daley Blind	(yellow card) 64'
RM	20	Georginio Wijnaldum
CM	6	Nigel de Jong
LM	15	Dirk Kuyt		(substituted off) 89'
AM	10	Wesley Sneijder		(substituted off) 75'
CF	11	Arjen Robben (c)
CF	17	Jeremain Lens		(substituted off) 69'
Substitutions:
MF	21	Memphis Depay		(substituted on) 69'
MF	18	Leroy Fer		(substituted on) 75'
DF	14	Terence Kongolo		(substituted on) 89'
Manager:
Louis van Gaal

GK	1	Claudio Bravo (c)
CB	17	Gary Medel
CB	5	Francisco Silva	(yellow card) 25'	(substituted off) 70'
CB	18	Gonzalo Jara
RWB	4	Mauricio Isla
LWB	2	Eugenio Mena
CM	20	Charles Aránguiz
CM	21	Marcelo Díaz
AM	16	Felipe Gutiérrez		(substituted off) 46'
CF	7	Alexis Sánchez
CF	11	Eduardo Vargas		(substituted off) 81'
Substitutions:
MF	15	Jean Beausejour		(substituted on) 46'
MF	10	Jorge Valdivia		(substituted on) 70'
FW	9	Mauricio Pinilla		(substituted on) 81'
Manager:
(Argentina) Jorge Sampaoli

Man of the Match:
Arjen Robben (Netherlands)

Assistant referees:
Evarist Menkouande (Cameroon)
Felicien Kabanda (Rwanda)
Fourth official:
Joel Aguilar (El Salvador)
Fifth official:
William Torres (El Salvador)

==== Knockout stage ====
Round of 16

29 June 2014
13:00

Netherlands	2–1	Mexico
Sneijder 88'; Huntelaar 90+4' (pen.)	Report	Dos Santos 48'

Estádio Castelão, Fortaleza
Attendance: 58,817
Referee: Pedro Proença (Portugal)

Netherlands	Mexico

GK	1	Jasper Cillessen
RB	12	Paul Verhaegh	(substituted off) 56'
CB	2	Ron Vlaar
CB	3	Stefan de Vrij
LB	5	Daley Blind
CM	15	Dirk Kuyt
CM	6	Nigel de Jong	(substituted off) 9'
CM	20	Georginio Wijnaldum
AM	10	Wesley Sneijder
CF	11	Arjen Robben
CF	9	Robin van Persie (c)	(substituted off) 76'
Substitutions:
DF	4	Bruno Martins Indi	(substituted on) 9'
MF	21	Memphis Depay	(substituted on) 56'
FW	19	Klaas-Jan Huntelaar	(substituted on) 76'
Manager:
Louis van Gaal

GK	13	Guillermo Ochoa
CB	2	Francisco Javier Rodríguez
CB	4	Rafael Márquez (c)	(yellow card) 90+2'
CB	15	Héctor Moreno		(substituted off) 46'
RWB	22	Paul Aguilar	(yellow card) 69'
LWB	7	Miguel Layún
CM	6	Héctor Herrera
CM	3	Carlos Salcido
CM	18	Andrés Guardado	(yellow card) 90+3'
CF	10	Giovani dos Santos		(substituted off) 61'
CF	19	Oribe Peralta		(substituted off) 75'
Substitutes:
DF	5	Diego Reyes		(substituted on) 46'
MF	20	Javier Aquino		(substituted on) 61'
FW	14	Javier Hernández		(substituted on) 75'
Manager:
Miguel Herrera

Man of the Match:
Guillermo Ochoa (Mexico)

Assistant referees:
Bertino Cunha (Portugal)
Tiago Trigo (Portugal)
Fourth official:
Carlos Vera (Ecuador)
Fifth official:
Byron Romero (Ecuador)

Quarter-final

5 July 2014
17:00

Netherlands	0–0 (a.e.t.)	Costa Rica
	Report
Penalties
Van Persie (penalty scored); Robben (penalty scored); Sneijder (penalty scored); Kuyt (penalty scored)	4–3	(penalty scored) Borges; (penalty missed) Ruiz; (penalty scored) González; (penalty scored) Bolaños; (penalty missed) Umaña

Arena Fonte Nova, Salvador
Attendance: 51,179
Referee: Ravshan Irmatov (Uzbekistan)

Netherlands	Costa Rica

GK	1	Jasper Cillessen		(substituted off) 120+1'
CB	3	Stefan de Vrij
CB	2	Ron Vlaar
CB	4	Bruno Martins Indi	(yellow card) 64'	(substituted off) 106'
RWB	15	Dirk Kuyt
LWB	5	Daley Blind
CM	20	Georginio Wijnaldum
CM	10	Wesley Sneijder
RW	11	Arjen Robben
LW	21	Memphis Depay		(substituted off) 76'
CF	9	Robin van Persie (c)
Substitutions:
MF	17	Jeremain Lens		(substituted on) 76'
FW	19	Klaas-Jan Huntelaar	(yellow card) 111'	(substituted on) 106'
GK	23	Tim Krul		(substituted on) 120+1'
Manager:
Louis van Gaal

GK	1	Keylor Navas
CB	2	Jhonny Acosta	(yellow card) 107'
CB	3	Giancarlo González	(yellow card) 81'
CB	4	Michael Umaña	(yellow card) 52'
RWB	16	Cristian Gamboa		(substituted off) 79'
LWB	15	Júnior Díaz	(yellow card) 37'
CM	17	Yeltsin Tejeda		(substituted off) 97'
CM	5	Celso Borges
RW	10	Bryan Ruiz (c)
LW	7	Christian Bolaños
CF	9	Joel Campbell		(substituted off) 66'
Substitutes:
FW	21	Marco Ureña		(substituted on) 66'
DF	8	David Myrie		(substituted on) 79'
MF	22	José Miguel Cubero		(substituted on) 97'
Manager:
(Colombia) Jorge Luis Pinto

Man of the Match:
Keylor Navas (Costa Rica)

Assistant referees:
Abdukhamidullo Rasulov (Uzbekistan)
Bahadyr Kochkarov (Kyrgyzstan)
Fourth official:
Noumandiez Doué (Ivory Coast)
Fifth official:
Songuifolo Yeo (Ivory Coast)

Semi-final

9 July 2014
17:00

Netherlands	0–0 (a.e.t.)	Argentina
	Report
Penalties
Vlaar (penalty missed); Robben (penalty scored); Sneijder (penalty missed); Kuyt (penalty scored)	2–4	(penalty scored) Messi; (penalty scored) Garay; (penalty scored) Agüero; (penalty scored) Rodríguez

Arena Corinthians, São Paulo
Attendance: 63,267
Referee: Cüneyt Çakır (Turkey)

Netherlands	Argentina

GK	1	Jasper Cillessen
CB	3	Stefan de Vrij
CB	2	Ron Vlaar
CB	4	Bruno Martins Indi	(yellow card) 45'	(substituted off) 46'
RWB	15	Dirk Kuyt
LWB	5	Daley Blind
CM	6	Nigel de Jong		(substituted off) 62'
CM	20	Georginio Wijnaldum
AM	10	Wesley Sneijder
CF	11	Arjen Robben
CF	9	Robin van Persie (c)		(substituted off) 96'
Substitutions:
DF	7	Daryl Janmaat		(substituted on) 46'
MF	16	Jordy Clasie		(substituted on) 62'
FW	19	Klaas-Jan Huntelaar	(yellow card) 105'	(substituted on) 96'
Manager:
Louis van Gaal

GK	1	Sergio Romero
RB	4	Pablo Zabaleta
CB	15	Martín Demichelis	(yellow card) 49'
CB	2	Ezequiel Garay
LB	16	Marcos Rojo
CM	6	Lucas Biglia
CM	14	Javier Mascherano
CM	8	Enzo Pérez		(substituted off) 81'
SS	10	Lionel Messi (c)
CF	9	Gonzalo Higuaín		(substituted off) 82'
CF	22	Ezequiel Lavezzi		(substituted off) 101'
Substitutes:
FW	18	Rodrigo Palacio		(substituted on) 81'
FW	20	Sergio Agüero		(substituted on) 82'
MF	11	Maxi Rodríguez		(substituted on) 101'
Manager:
Alejandro Sabella

Man of the Match:
Sergio Romero (Argentina)

Assistant referees:
Bahattin Duran (Turkey)
Tarık Ongun (Turkey)
Fourth official:
Jonas Eriksson (Sweden)
Fifth official:
Mathias Klasenius (Sweden)

Match for third place

12 July 2014
17:00

Brazil	0–3	Netherlands
	Report	Van Persie 3' (pen.); Blind 17'; Wijnaldum 90+1'

Estádio Nacional Mané Garrincha, Brasília
Attendance: 68,034
Referee: Djamel Haimoudi (Algeria)

Brazil	Netherlands

GK	12	Júlio César
RB	23	Maicon
CB	3	Thiago Silva (c)	(yellow card) 2'
CB	4	David Luiz
LB	14	Maxwell
CM	8	Paulinho		(substituted off) 57'
CM	17	Luiz Gustavo		(substituted off) 46'
RW	16	Ramires		(substituted off) 73'
AM	11	Oscar	(yellow card) 68'
LW	19	Willian
CF	21	Jô
Substitutes:
MF	5	Fernandinho	(yellow card) 54'	(substituted on) 46'
MF	18	Hernanes		(substituted on) 57'
FW	7	Hulk		(substituted on) 73'
Manager:
Luiz Felipe Scolari

GK	1	Jasper Cillessen		(substituted off) 90+3'
CB	3	Stefan de Vrij
CB	2	Ron Vlaar
CB	4	Bruno Martins Indi
RWB	15	Dirk Kuyt
LWB	5	Daley Blind		(substituted off) 70'
CM	20	Georginio Wijnaldum
CM	16	Jordy Clasie		(substituted off) 90'
CM	8	Jonathan de Guzmán	(yellow card) 36'
CF	9	Robin van Persie (c)
CF	11	Arjen Robben	(yellow card) 9'
Substitutes:
DF	7	Daryl Janmaat		(substituted on) 70'
DF	13	Joël Veltman		(substituted on) 90'
GK	22	Michel Vorm		(substituted on) 90+3'
Manager:
Louis van Gaal

Man of the Match:
Arjen Robben (Netherlands)

Assistant referees:
Rédouane Achik (Morocco)
Abdelhalk Etchiali (Algeria)
Fourth official:
Yuichi Nishimura (Japan)
Fifth official:
Toru Sagara (Japan)

=== Qatar 2022 ===
==== Group stage ====
Pos	Team	Pld	W	D	L	GF	GA	GD	Pts	Qualification
1	Netherlands	3	2	1	0	5	1	+4	7	Advance to knockout stage
2	Senegal	3	2	0	1	5	4	+1	6	Advance to knockout stage
3	Ecuador	3	1	1	1	4	3	+1	4	
4	Qatar (H)	3	0	0	3	1	7	−6	0	

Source: FIFA
Rules for classification: Group stage tiebreakers
(H) Hosts
21 November 2022
19:00

Senegal	0–2	Netherlands
		Gakpo 84'; Klaassen 90+9'

Al Thumama Stadium, Doha
Attendance: 41,721
Referee: Wilton Sampaio (Brazil)

25 November 2022
19:00

Netherlands	1–1	Ecuador
Gakpo 6'		Valencia 49'

Khalifa International Stadium, Al Rayyan
Attendance: 44,833
Referee: Mustapha Ghorbal (Algeria)

29 November 2022
18:00

Netherlands	2–0	Qatar
Gakpo 26'; F. de Jong 49'

Al Bayt Stadium, Al Khor
Attendance: 66,784
Referee: Bakary Gassama (Gambia)

==== Knockout stage ====
Round of 16

3 December 2022
18:00

Netherlands	3–1	United States
Depay 10'; Blind 45+1'; Dumfries 81'		Wright 76'

Khalifa International Stadium, Al Rayyan
Attendance: 44,846
Referee: Wilton Sampaio (Brazil)

Quarter-finals

9 December 2022
22:00

Netherlands	2–2 (a.e.t.)	Argentina
Weghorst 83', 90+11'		Molina 35'; Messi 73' (pen.)
Penalties
Van Dijk (penalty missed); Berghuis (penalty missed); Koopmeiners (penalty scored); Weghorst (penalty scored); L. de Jong (penalty scored)	3–4	(penalty scored) Messi; (penalty scored) Paredes; (penalty scored) Montiel; (penalty missed) Fernández; (penalty scored) La. Martínez

Lusail Stadium, Lusail
Attendance: 88,235
Referee: Antonio Mateu Lahoz (Spain)

=== Canada–Mexico–United States 2026 ===
==== Group stage ====
Pos	Team	Pld	W	D	L	GF	GA	GD	Pts	Qualification
1	Netherlands	3	2	1	0	10	4	+6	7	Advance to knockout stage
2	Japan	3	1	2	0	7	3	+4	5	Advance to knockout stage
3	Sweden	3	1	1	1	7	7	0	4	Advance to knockout stage
4	Tunisia	3	0	0	3	2	12	−10	0	

Source: FIFA
Rules for classification: Group stage tiebreakers
June 14, 2026
3:00 p.m. UTC−5

Netherlands	2–2	Japan
Van Dijk 51'; Summerville 64'	(Note: "Netherlands vs Japan | First Stage | FIFA World Cup 2026". FIFA. Retrieved June 14, 2026.; "Match Report – Group F – Netherlands v. Japan". FIFA. June 14, 2026. Retrieved June 14, 2026.; "Post match summary report – Group F – Netherlands v. Japan". FIFA. June 14, 2026. Retrieved June 15, 2026.)	Nakamura 57'; Kamada 88'

AT&T Stadium, Arlington
Attendance: 69,285
Referee: Ismail Elfath (United States)

June 20, 2026
12:00 p.m. UTC−5

Netherlands	5–1	Sweden
Brobbey 5', 17'; Gakpo 47', 54'; Summerville 89'	(Note: "Netherlands vs Sweden | First Stage | FIFA World Cup 2026". FIFA. Retrieved June 20, 2026.; "Match Report – Group F – Netherlands v. Sweden". FIFA. June 20, 2026. Retrieved June 20, 2026.; "Post match summary report – Group F – Netherlands v. Sweden". FIFA. June 20, 2026. Retrieved June 25, 2026.)	Elanga 59'

NRG Stadium, Houston
Attendance: 68,777
Referee: Michael Oliver (England)

June 25, 2026
6:00 p.m. UTC−5

Tunisia	1–3	Netherlands
Mastouri 54'	(Note: "Tunisia vs Netherlands | First Stage | FIFA World Cup 2026". FIFA. Retrieved June 26, 2026.; "Match Report – Group F – Tunisia v. Netherlands". FIFA. June 26, 2026. Retrieved June 26, 2026.; "Post match summary report – Group F – Tunisia v. Netherlands". FIFA. June 25, 2026. Retrieved June 27, 2026.)	Skhiri 3' (o.g.); Brobbey 7'; Van Hecke 62'

Arrowhead Stadium, Kansas City
Attendance: 68,391
Referee: Katia Itzel García (Mexico)

==== Knockout stage ====
June 29, 2026
7:00 p.m. UTC−6

Netherlands	1–1 (a.e.t.)	Morocco
Gakpo 72'	(Note: "Netherlands vs Morocco | Round of 32 | FIFA World Cup 2026". FIFA. Retrieved June 30, 2026.; "Match Report – Round of 32 – Netherlands v. Morocco". FIFA. June 30, 2026. Retrieved June 30, 2026.; "Post match summary report – Round of 32 – Netherlands v. Morocco". FIFA. June 30, 2026. Retrieved June 30, 2026.)	Diop 90+1'
Penalties
Koopmeiners (penalty scored); Kluivert (penalty missed); Weghorst (penalty scored); Timber (penalty missed); Summerville (penalty missed)	2–3	(penalty missed) El Aynaoui; (penalty scored) Rahimi; (penalty scored) Talbi; (penalty missed) Hakimi; (penalty scored) Saibari

Estadio BBVA, Guadalupe
Attendance: 51,243
Referee: Wilton Sampaio (Brazil)

== Most appearances ==
Rank	Player	Matches	World Cups
1	Wesley Sneijder	17	2006, 2010 and 2014
1	Robin van Persie	17	2006, 2010 and 2014
3	Dirk Kuyt	15	2006, 2010 and 2014
3	Arjen Robben	15	2006, 2010 and 2014
5	Wim Jansen	14	1974 and 1978
5	Ruud Krol	14	1974 and 1978
5	Johnny Rep	14	1974 and 1978
8	Arie Haan	13	1974 and 1978
8	Rob Rensenbrink	13	1974 and 1978
10	Dennis Bergkamp	12	1994 and 1998
10	Daley Blind	12	2014 and 2022
10	Memphis Depay	12	2014, 2022 and 2026
10	Jan Jongbloed	12	1974 and 1978
10	Johan Neeskens	12	1974 and 1978

== Goalscorers ==
Player	Goals	1934	1938	1974	1978	1990	1994	1998	2006	2010	2014	2022	2026
Johnny Rep	7			4	3								
Rob Rensenbrink	6			1	5								
Dennis Bergkamp	6						3	3					
Arjen Robben	6								1	2	3		
Robin van Persie	6								1	1	4		
Wesley Sneijder	6									5	1		
Cody Gakpo	6											3	3
Johan Neeskens	4			4									
Johan Cruyff	3			3									
Memphis Depay	3										2	1	
Ernie Brandts	2				2								
Arie Haan	2				2								
Brian Brobbey	2												2
Crysencio Summerville	2												2
Kick Smit	1	1											
Leen Vente	1	1											
Theo de Jong	1			1									
Ruud Krol	1			1									
Willy van de Kerkhof	1				1								
René van de Kerkhof	1				1								
Dick Nanninga	1				1								
Virgil van Dijk	1												1
Total	69	2	0	14	15	0	3	3	2	8	10	4	8

== See also ==
- Netherlands at the UEFA European Championship
