= 2014 FIFA World Cup knockout stage =

The knockout stage of the 2014 FIFA World Cup was the second and final stage of the competition, following the group stage. It began on 28 June with the round of 16 and ended on 13 July with the final match of the tournament, held at Estádio do Maracanã, Rio de Janeiro. The top two teams from each group (16 in total) advanced to the knockout stage to compete in a single-elimination tournament. A match for third place was played between the two losing teams of the semi-finals.

In all matches in the knockout stage, if the score was level at the end of 90 minutes, two 15-minute periods of extra time were played. If the score was still level after extra time, the match was decided by a penalty shoot-out.

All times listed below are in Brasília official time (UTC−3).

== Qualified teams ==
The top two placed teams from each of the eight groups qualified for the knockout stage.

Group	Winners	Runners-up
A	Brazil	Mexico
B	Netherlands	Chile
C	Colombia	Greece
D	Costa Rica	Uruguay
E	France	Switzerland
F	Argentina	Nigeria
G	Germany	United States
H	Belgium	Algeria

== Bracket ==
Round of 16
28 June – Belo Horizonte
Brazil (p)	1 (3)
Chile	1 (2)
28 June – Rio de Janeiro
Colombia	2
Uruguay	0
30 June – Brasília
France	2
Nigeria	0
30 June – Porto Alegre
Germany (a.e.t.)	2
Algeria	1
29 June – Fortaleza
Netherlands	2
Mexico	1
29 June – Recife
Costa Rica (p)	1 (5)
Greece	1 (3)
1 July – São Paulo
Argentina (a.e.t.)	1
Switzerland	0
1 July – Salvador
Belgium (a.e.t.)	2
United States	1

Quarter-finals
4 July – Fortaleza
Brazil	2
Colombia	1
4 July – Rio de Janeiro
France	0
Germany	1
5 July – Salvador
Netherlands (p)	0 (4)
Costa Rica	0 (3)
5 July – Brasília
Argentina	1
Belgium	0

Semi-finals
8 July – Belo Horizonte
Brazil	1
Germany	7
9 July – São Paulo
Netherlands	0 (2)
Argentina (p)	0 (4)

Final
13 July – Rio de Janeiro
Germany (a.e.t.)	1
Argentina	0
Match for third place
12 July – Brasília
Brazil	0
Netherlands	3

== Round of 16 ==
=== Brazil vs Chile ===
The two teams had met in 68 previous matches, including three times in the FIFA World Cup knockout stage, all won by Brazil (1962, semi-finals: 4–2; 1998, round of 16: 4–1; 2010, round of 16: 3–0).

Brazil opened the scoring when Thiago Silva flicked on a corner kick before David Luiz turned the ball into the net with his thigh. While replays suggested that Chilean defender Gonzalo Jara may have had the last touch, FIFA later confirmed that the goal was scored by Luiz, not Jara. Chile equalised when Hulk lost possession after a throw-in in his own half; Eduardo Vargas stole the ball and passed to Alexis Sánchez to score.

In the second half, Hulk's goal was disallowed as Howard Webb adjudged that the player used his arm in bringing down the ball and gave him a yellow card instead. Chances were few after that with Brazil dominating possession and Hulk forcing Claudio Bravo into a decent save, and the match went to extra time. The best chance of extra time came in the last seconds as Mauricio Pinilla's shot hit the crossbar. In the resulting penalty shoot-out, the score was tied 2–2 after four rounds, with Brazil goalkeeper Júlio César saving from Pinilla and Sánchez, while Willian missed and Hulk's shot was saved by Bravo. In the fifth round, Neymar scored his penalty, meaning Chile had to score, but Jara's shot hit the inside of the post. Brazil advanced to the quarter-finals to face Colombia.

The result meant that in all four World Cups where Chile qualified for the knockout stage, they were eliminated by Brazil.

28 June 2014
13:00 BRT (UTC−3)

Brazil	1–1 (a.e.t.)	Chile
David Luiz 18'		Sánchez 32'
Penalties
David Luiz (penalty scored); Willian (penalty missed); Marcelo (penalty scored); Hulk (penalty missed); Neymar (penalty scored)	3–2	(penalty missed) Pinilla; (penalty missed) Sánchez; (penalty scored) Aránguiz; (penalty scored) Díaz; (penalty missed) Jara

Estádio Mineirão, Belo Horizonte
Attendance: 57,714
Referee: Howard Webb (England)

Brazil	Chile

GK	12	Júlio César
RB	2	Dani Alves	(yellow card) 105+1'
CB	3	Thiago Silva (c)
CB	4	David Luiz
LB	6	Marcelo
DM	5	Fernandinho		(substituted off) 72'
DM	17	Luiz Gustavo	(yellow card) 60'
RW	7	Hulk	(yellow card) 55'
AM	11	Oscar		(substituted off) 106'
LW	10	Neymar
CF	9	Fred		(substituted off) 64'
Substitutes:
FW	21	Jô	(yellow card) 93'	(substituted on) 64'
MF	16	Ramires		(substituted on) 72'
MF	19	Willian		(substituted on) 106'
Manager:
Luiz Felipe Scolari

GK	1	Claudio Bravo (c)
CB	5	Francisco Silva	(yellow card) 40'
CB	17	Gary Medel		(substituted off) 108'
CB	18	Gonzalo Jara
RWB	4	Mauricio Isla
LWB	2	Eugenio Mena	(yellow card) 17'
CM	20	Charles Aránguiz
CM	21	Marcelo Díaz
AM	8	Arturo Vidal		(substituted off) 87'
CF	7	Alexis Sánchez
CF	11	Eduardo Vargas		(substituted off) 57'
Substitutes:
MF	16	Felipe Gutiérrez		(substituted on) 57'
FW	9	Mauricio Pinilla	(yellow card) 102'	(substituted on) 87'
DF	13	José Rojas		(substituted on) 108'
Manager:
(Argentina) Jorge Sampaoli

Man of the Match:
Júlio César (Brazil)

Assistant referees:
Michael Mullarkey (England)
Darren Cann (England)
Fourth official:
Felix Brych (Germany)
Fifth official:
Mark Borsch (Germany)

=== Colombia vs Uruguay ===
The two teams had met in 38 previous matches, including in the 1962 FIFA World Cup group stage, won 2–1 by Uruguay. Their most recent meetings were in the 2014 FIFA World Cup qualifiers, with both teams winning at home, Colombia winning 4–0 and Uruguay winning 2–0. Uruguayan striker Luis Suárez was not in the line-up because of a nine-game ban imposed by FIFA due to a biting incident involving Italian defender Giorgio Chiellini during their final group stage match. This was the first match of Uruguay in Maracanã Stadium in a World Cup since the historical Maracanazo.

Colombia won 2–0 with both goals from James Rodríguez, the first in the 28th minute, where he controlled Abel Aguilar's headed ball on his chest before volleying left-footed from 25 yards out with the ball going in off the underside of the crossbar, which won the 2014 FIFA Puskás Award later in the year. The second goal, in the 50th minute, was a close-range shot from six yards out after receiving the ball from a header by Juan Cuadrado on the right.

Colombia progressed through to the quarter-finals for the first time in their history, where they would face Brazil.

28 June 2014
17:00 BRT (UTC−3)

Colombia	2–0	Uruguay
Rodríguez 28', 50'

Estádio do Maracanã, Rio de Janeiro
Attendance: 73,804
Referee: Björn Kuipers (Netherlands)

Colombia	Uruguay

GK	1	David Ospina
RB	18	Juan Camilo Zúñiga
CB	2	Cristián Zapata
CB	3	Mario Yepes (c)
LB	7	Pablo Armero	(yellow card) 78'
RM	11	Juan Cuadrado		(substituted off) 81'
CM	8	Abel Aguilar
CM	6	Carlos Sánchez
LM	10	James Rodríguez		(substituted off) 85'
CF	9	Teófilo Gutiérrez		(substituted off) 68'
CF	21	Jackson Martínez
Substitutes:
MF	15	Alexander Mejía		(substituted on) 68'
MF	13	Fredy Guarín		(substituted on) 81'
FW	19	Adrián Ramos		(substituted on) 85'
Manager:
(Argentina) José Pékerman

GK	1	Fernando Muslera
RB	22	Martín Cáceres
CB	13	José Giménez	(yellow card) 55'
CB	3	Diego Godín (c)
LB	6	Álvaro Pereira		(substituted off) 53'
RM	16	Maxi Pereira
CM	20	Álvaro González		(substituted off) 67'
CM	17	Egidio Arévalo
LM	7	Cristian Rodríguez
SS	21	Edinson Cavani
CF	10	Diego Forlán		(substituted off) 53'
Substitutes:
FW	11	Cristhian Stuani		(substituted on) 53'
MF	18	Gastón Ramírez		(substituted on) 53'
FW	8	Abel Hernández		(substituted on) 67'
Other disciplinary actions:
DF	2	Diego Lugano	(yellow card) 77'
Manager:
Óscar Tabárez

Man of the Match:
James Rodríguez (Colombia)

Assistant referees:
Sander van Roekel (Netherlands)
Erwin Zeinstra (Netherlands)
Fourth official:
Svein Oddvar Moen (Norway)
Fifth official:
Kim Haglund (Norway)

=== Netherlands vs Mexico ===
The two teams had met in six previous matches, including in the 1998 FIFA World Cup group stage, a 2–2 draw. Mexico midfielder José Juan Vázquez was suspended for the match due to accumulation of yellow cards.

Giovani dos Santos opened the scoring for Mexico early in the second half with a left-footed volley from outside the box after gathering a Dutch clearance. Mexico led until the 88th minute, when a Dutch corner was headed back by substitute Klaas-Jan Huntelaar for Wesley Sneijder to equalise with a hard shot from 16 yards. Only a few minutes later, with stoppage time coming to a close, Arjen Robben drew a very controversial penalty for the Netherlands after being fouled by Rafael Márquez on the right of the penalty area, which Huntelaar converted to win the match for the Netherlands. Netherlands advanced to the quarter-finals to face Costa Rica, while Mexico were eliminated in the round of 16 for the sixth tournament in a row.

The match was the first time in World Cup history where a cooling break was instituted, with temperatures at 32 °C (90 °F) and humidity levels at 68%.

29 June 2014
13:00 BRT (UTC−3)

Netherlands	2–1	Mexico
Sneijder 88'; Huntelaar 90+4' (pen.)		Dos Santos 48'

Estádio Castelão, Fortaleza
Attendance: 58,817
Referee: Pedro Proença (Portugal)

Netherlands	Mexico

GK	1	Jasper Cillessen
RB	12	Paul Verhaegh	(substituted off) 56'
CB	2	Ron Vlaar
CB	3	Stefan de Vrij
LB	5	Daley Blind
CM	6	Nigel de Jong	(substituted off) 9'
RM	15	Dirk Kuyt
LM	20	Georginio Wijnaldum
AM	10	Wesley Sneijder
CF	11	Arjen Robben
CF	9	Robin van Persie (c)	(substituted off) 76'
Substitutions:
DF	4	Bruno Martins Indi	(substituted on) 9'
MF	21	Memphis Depay	(substituted on) 56'
FW	19	Klaas-Jan Huntelaar	(substituted on) 76'
Manager:
Louis van Gaal

GK	13	Guillermo Ochoa
CB	2	Francisco Javier Rodríguez
CB	4	Rafael Márquez (c)	(yellow card) 90+2'
CB	15	Héctor Moreno		(substituted off) 46'
RWB	22	Paul Aguilar	(yellow card) 69'
LWB	7	Miguel Layún
CM	6	Héctor Herrera
CM	3	Carlos Salcido
CM	18	Andrés Guardado	(yellow card) 90+3'
CF	10	Giovani dos Santos		(substituted off) 61'
CF	19	Oribe Peralta		(substituted off) 75'
Substitutes:
DF	5	Diego Reyes		(substituted on) 46'
MF	20	Javier Aquino		(substituted on) 61'
FW	14	Javier Hernández		(substituted on) 75'
Manager:
Miguel Herrera

Man of the Match:
Guillermo Ochoa (Mexico)

Assistant referees:
Bertino Cunha (Portugal)
Tiago Trigo (Portugal)
Fourth official:
Carlos Vera (Ecuador)
Fifth official:
Byron Romero (Ecuador)

=== Costa Rica vs Greece ===
The two teams had never met before. This match was Greece's first ever in the FIFA World Cup knockout stage.

Bryan Ruiz opened the scoring in the 52nd minute when Christian Bolaños passed to him and he shot low left-footed from outside the penalty area to the right corner of the net with Greek goalkeeper Orestis Karnezis not moving on his line. Costa Rica were then reduced to 10 men with Óscar Duarte being sent off after picking up a second yellow card. Sokratis Papastathopoulos equalised in injury time shooting into the net from seven yards out after Costa Rica goalkeeper Keylor Navas had saved an initial shot from Theofanis Gekas. No goals were scored in extra time, and the match went to a penalty shoot-out. During the intermission before the penalty shoot-out, the Greek coach Fernando Santos was sent off following a dispute with the referee. In the penalty shoot-out, Navas saved Gekas' shot before Michael Umaña scored the winning penalty for Costa Rica hitting it high to the goalkeeper's right.

This marked the first time that Costa Rica progressed to the quarter-finals in a FIFA World Cup, where they faced the Netherlands.

29 June 2014
17:00 BRT (UTC−3)

Costa Rica	1–1 (a.e.t.)	Greece
Ruiz 52'		Papastathopoulos 90+1'
Penalties
Borges (penalty scored); Ruiz (penalty scored); González (penalty scored); Campbell (penalty scored); Umaña (penalty scored)	5–3	(penalty scored) Mitroglou; (penalty scored) Christodoulopoulos; (penalty scored) Holebas; (penalty missed) Gekas

Itaipava Arena Pernambuco, Recife
Attendance: 41,242
Referee: Ben Williams (Australia)

Costa Rica	Greece

GK	1	Keylor Navas	(yellow card) 90'
CB	6	Óscar Duarte	(yellow card) 42' (yellow-red card) 66'
CB	3	Giancarlo González
CB	4	Michael Umaña
RWB	16	Cristian Gamboa		(substituted off) 77'
LWB	15	Júnior Díaz
CM	5	Celso Borges
CM	17	Yeltsin Tejeda	(yellow card) 48'	(substituted off) 66'
RW	10	Bryan Ruiz (c)	(yellow card) 70'
LW	7	Christian Bolaños		(substituted off) 83'
CF	9	Joel Campbell
Substitutions:
MF	22	José Miguel Cubero		(substituted on) 66'
DF	2	Jhonny Acosta		(substituted on) 77'
FW	14	Randall Brenes		(substituted on) 83'
Other disciplinary actions:
MF	13	Óscar Granados	(yellow card) 57'
Manager:
(Colombia) Jorge Luis Pinto

GK	1	Orestis Karnezis
RB	15	Vasilis Torosidis
CB	4	Kostas Manolas	(yellow card) 72'
CB	19	Sokratis Papastathopoulos
LB	20	José Holebas
DM	10	Giorgos Karagounis (c)
CM	2	Giannis Maniatis		(substituted off) 78'
CM	22	Andreas Samaris	(yellow card) 36'	(substituted off) 58'
RW	14	Dimitris Salpingidis		(substituted off) 69'
LW	16	Lazaros Christodoulopoulos
CF	7	Georgios Samaras
Substitutes:
FW	9	Kostas Mitroglou		(substituted on) 58'
FW	17	Theofanis Gekas		(substituted on) 69'
MF	21	Kostas Katsouranis		(substituted on) 78'
Manager:
(Portugal) Fernando Santos (Note: Santos was expelled by the referee in the 120+1st minute.)

Man of the Match:
Keylor Navas (Costa Rica)

Assistant referees:
Matthew Cream (Australia)
Hakan Anaz (Australia)
Fourth official:
Nawaf Shukralla (Bahrain)
Fifth official:
Yaser Tulefat (Bahrain)

=== France vs Nigeria ===
The two teams had met in one previous match, in a friendly in 2009, won by Nigeria 1–0.

Paul Pogba had the best chance in the first half but his right foot volley after a cross from the right was saved by Vincent Enyeama. In the second half Yohan Cabaye saw a shot come back off the bar. The opening goal came with 11 minutes to play when Pogba headed into the net after a mistake by Enyeama where he failed to hold onto a corner kick from the left by Mathieu Valbuena. In injury time, France got a second when Joseph Yobo put into his own net under pressure from Antoine Griezmann after a cross from the right by Valbuena.

France advanced to the quarter-finals to face Germany, while Nigeria were eliminated at the round of 16 in all three World Cups where they reached the knockout stage.

30 June 2014
13:00 BRT (UTC−3)

France	2–0	Nigeria
Pogba 79'; Yobo 90+2' (o.g.)

Estádio Nacional Mané Garrincha, Brasília
Attendance: 67,882
Referee: Mark Geiger (United States)

France	Nigeria

GK	1	Hugo Lloris (c)
RB	2	Mathieu Debuchy
CB	4	Raphaël Varane
CB	21	Laurent Koscielny
LB	3	Patrice Evra
DM	6	Yohan Cabaye
CM	19	Paul Pogba
CM	14	Blaise Matuidi	(yellow card) 54'
RW	8	Mathieu Valbuena		(substituted off) 90+4'
LW	10	Karim Benzema
CF	9	Olivier Giroud		(substituted off) 62'
Substitutions:
FW	11	Antoine Griezmann		(substituted on) 62'
MF	18	Moussa Sissoko		(substituted on) 90+4'
Manager:
Didier Deschamps

GK	1	Vincent Enyeama
RB	5	Efe Ambrose
CB	2	Joseph Yobo (c)
CB	13	Juwon Oshaniwa
LB	22	Kenneth Omeruo
RM	7	Ahmed Musa
CM	17	Ogenyi Onazi	(substituted off) 59'
CM	10	John Obi Mikel
LM	11	Victor Moses	(substituted off) 89'
SS	8	Peter Odemwingie
CF	9	Emmanuel Emenike
Substitutes:
MF	4	Reuben Gabriel	(substituted on) 59'
FW	19	Uche Nwofor	(substituted on) 89'
Manager:
Stephen Keshi

Man of the Match:
Paul Pogba (France)

Assistant referees:
Mark Hurd (United States)
Joe Fletcher (Canada)
Fourth official:
Alireza Faghani (Iran)
Fifth official:
Hassan Kamranifar (Iran)

=== Germany vs Algeria ===
The two teams had met in two previous matches, including in the 1982 FIFA World Cup group stage, where Algeria defeated West Germany 2–1. This match was Algeria's first ever in the FIFA World Cup knockout stage.

After a goalless 90 minutes when an Algerian goal was disallowed, Germany opened the scoring two minutes into extra time, when half-time substitute André Schürrle scored with a left foot back-heel from Thomas Müller's cross from the left. Germany extended the lead in the 119th minute when Mesut Özil converted with his left foot high into the net after Schürrle's shot was blocked on the line, but Algeria pulled one back in injury time when substitute Abdelmoumene Djabou scored with his left foot from six yards after a cross from the right by Sofiane Feghouli.

Germany advanced to the quarter-finals to face France, continuing their streak of reaching the last eight in every World Cup since 1954. Djabou's goal, timed at 120 minutes and 51 seconds, was the latest goal in World Cup history, surpassing Alessandro Del Piero's goal against Germany in 2006, timed at 120 minutes and 13 seconds, until Youri Tielemans's penalty goal against Senegal in 2026, timed at 124 minutes and 44 seconds.

30 June 2014
17:00 BRT (UTC−3)

Germany	2–1 (a.e.t.)	Algeria
Schürrle 92'; Özil 119'		Djabou 120+1'

Estádio Beira-Rio, Porto Alegre
Attendance: 43,063
Referee: Sandro Ricci (Brazil)

Germany	Algeria

GK	1	Manuel Neuer
RB	21	Shkodran Mustafi		(substituted off) 70'
CB	17	Per Mertesacker
CB	20	Jérôme Boateng
LB	4	Benedikt Höwedes
DM	16	Philipp Lahm (c)	(yellow card) 107'
CM	7	Bastian Schweinsteiger		(substituted off) 109'
CM	18	Toni Kroos
RW	8	Mesut Özil
LW	19	Mario Götze		(substituted off) 46'
CF	13	Thomas Müller
Substitutes:
MF	9	André Schürrle		(substituted on) 46'
MF	6	Sami Khedira		(substituted on) 70'
MF	23	Christoph Kramer		(substituted on) 109'
Manager:
Joachim Löw

GK	23	Raïs M'Bolhi
CB	22	Mehdi Mostefa
CB	4	Essaïd Belkalem
CB	5	Rafik Halliche (c)	(yellow card) 42'	(substituted off) 97'
RWB	20	Aïssa Mandi
LWB	3	Faouzi Ghoulam
DM	8	Mehdi Lacen
RM	19	Saphir Taïder		(substituted off) 78'
CM	10	Sofiane Feghouli
LM	13	Islam Slimani
CF	15	Hillal Soudani		(substituted off) 100'
Substitutes:
MF	11	Yacine Brahimi		(substituted on) 78'
DF	2	Madjid Bougherra		(substituted on) 97'
MF	18	Abdelmoumene Djabou		(substituted on) 100'
Manager:
(Bosnia and Herzegovina) Vahid Halilhodžić

Man of the Match:
Raïs M'Bolhi (Algeria)

Assistant referees:
Emerson de Carvalho (Brazil)
Marcelo Van Gasse (Brazil)
Fourth official:
Walter López (Guatemala)
Fifth official:
Leonel Leal (Costa Rica)

=== Argentina vs Switzerland ===
The two teams had met in six previous matches, including in the 1966 FIFA World Cup group stage, won by Argentina 2–0.

The match went to extra time with Ángel Di María scoring the only goal with two minutes remaining with a side-foot finish from the right of the penalty area after a run and pass from Lionel Messi. Switzerland had a chance to equalise in injury time but Blerim Džemaili headed against the post then prodded the rebound wide. Argentina advanced to the quarter-finals to face Belgium.

1 July 2014
13:00 BRT (UTC−3)

Argentina	1–0 (a.e.t.)	Switzerland
Di María 118'

Arena Corinthians, São Paulo
Attendance: 63,255
Referee: Jonas Eriksson (Sweden)

Argentina	Switzerland

GK	1	Sergio Romero
RB	4	Pablo Zabaleta
CB	17	Federico Fernández
CB	2	Ezequiel Garay	(yellow card) 120+4'
LB	16	Marcos Rojo	(yellow card) 90'	(substituted off) 105+1'
CM	5	Fernando Gago		(substituted off) 106'
CM	14	Javier Mascherano
CM	7	Ángel Di María	(yellow card) 120'
AM	10	Lionel Messi (c)
SS	9	Gonzalo Higuaín
CF	22	Ezequiel Lavezzi		(substituted off) 74'
Substitutes:
FW	18	Rodrigo Palacio		(substituted on) 74'
DF	23	José María Basanta		(substituted on) 105+1'
MF	6	Lucas Biglia		(substituted on) 106'
Manager:
Alejandro Sabella

GK	1	Diego Benaglio
RB	2	Stephan Lichtsteiner
CB	20	Johan Djourou
CB	22	Fabian Schär
LB	13	Ricardo Rodriguez
CM	11	Valon Behrami
CM	8	Gökhan Inler (c)
RW	23	Xherdan Shaqiri
AM	10	Granit Xhaka	(yellow card) 36'	(substituted off) 66'
LW	18	Admir Mehmedi		(substituted off) 113'
CF	19	Josip Drmić		(substituted off) 82'
Substitutions:
MF	16	Gelson Fernandes	(yellow card) 73'	(substituted on) 66'
MF	9	Haris Seferovic		(substituted on) 82'
MF	15	Blerim Džemaili		(substituted on) 113'
Manager:
(Germany) Ottmar Hitzfeld

Man of the Match:
Lionel Messi (Argentina)

Assistant referees:
Mathias Klasenius (Sweden)
Daniel Wärnmark (Sweden)
Fourth official:
Svein Oddvar Moen (Norway)
Fifth official:
Kim Haglund (Norway)

=== Belgium vs United States ===
The two teams had met in five previous matches, including one in the 1930 FIFA World Cup group stage won by United States 3–0 and which was one of the two first FIFA World Cup matches to be played. An unofficial friendly between the two teams was scheduled on 12 June 2014 in São Paulo, but was cancelled because of traffic due to the opening ceremony and match. Belgium midfielder Steven Defour was suspended for the match, after being sent off in the last group stage match against South Korea.

In a game dominated by the Belgians, but still goalless through the first 90 minutes thanks to U.S. goalkeeper Tim Howard, U.S. striker Chris Wondolowski missed a great chance in stoppage time from less than five yards out. Thus, the game went to extra time and Belgium took the lead within two minutes. Romelu Lukaku, who came off the bench at the start of extra time, crossed from the right into the penalty area, Matt Besler failed to clear the ball, and Kevin De Bruyne shot low into the far corner from the right of the penalty area. Near the end of extra time first half, De Bruyne's through ball from the right set up Lukaku to extend the lead with a left footed shot to the net. The United States pulled one back early in extra time second half, when substitute Julian Green volleyed in Michael Bradley's lobbed pass with his right foot from near the penalty spot. Minutes later, the U.S. nearly equalised on a set piece routine that saw Clint Dempsey through on goal, but his first touch was too hard and the ball was corralled by Belgian goalkeeper Thibaut Courtois. Belgium held on for the win, and advanced to the quarter-finals to face Argentina.

With Belgium's victory, the 2014 World Cup became the first tournament where all the top teams of the group stage advanced to the quarter-finals. U.S. goalkeeper Tim Howard recorded 15 saves (Note: FIFA's initial match statistics showed 16 saves, and many news sources continue to use this number. The official FIFA statistics were updated on 5 July 2014 to show 15 saves.) in the match, which was the most saves recorded in a match since FIFA started to keep track of the number of saves in 1966. Julian Green also became the youngest player to score a goal in the 2014 FIFA World Cup. The two would face each other in the 2026 FIFA World Cup Where Belgium won 4-1 to get to the next round

1 July 2014
17:00 BRT (UTC−3)

Belgium	2–1 (a.e.t.)	United States
De Bruyne 93'; Lukaku 105'		Green 107'

Itaipava Arena Fonte Nova, Salvador
Attendance: 51,227
Referee: Djamel Haimoudi (Algeria)

Belgium	United States

GK	1	Thibaut Courtois
RB	2	Toby Alderweireld
CB	15	Daniel Van Buyten
CB	4	Vincent Kompany (c)	(yellow card) 42'
LB	5	Jan Vertonghen
CM	6	Axel Witsel
CM	8	Marouane Fellaini
RW	14	Dries Mertens		(substituted off) 60'
AM	7	Kevin De Bruyne
LW	10	Eden Hazard		(substituted off) 111'
CF	17	Divock Origi		(substituted off) 91'
Substitutes:
MF	11	Kevin Mirallas		(substituted on) 60'
FW	9	Romelu Lukaku		(substituted on) 91'
MF	22	Nacer Chadli		(substituted on) 111'
Manager:
Marc Wilmots

GK	1	Tim Howard
RB	20	Geoff Cameron	(yellow card) 18'
CB	3	Omar Gonzalez
CB	5	Matt Besler
LB	7	DaMarcus Beasley
DM	13	Jermaine Jones
CM	19	Graham Zusi		(substituted off) 72'
CM	4	Michael Bradley
RW	23	Fabian Johnson		(substituted off) 32'
LW	11	Alejandro Bedoya		(substituted off) 105+2'
CF	8	Clint Dempsey (c)
Substitutes:
DF	2	DeAndre Yedlin		(substituted on) 32'
FW	18	Chris Wondolowski		(substituted on) 72'
MF	16	Julian Green		(substituted on) 105+2'
Manager:
(Germany) Jürgen Klinsmann

Man of the Match:
Tim Howard (United States)

Assistant referees:
Rédouane Achik (Morocco)
Abdelhak Etchiali (Algeria)
Fourth official:
Norbert Hauata (Tahiti)
Fifth official:
Aden Range (Kenya)

== Quarter-finals ==
=== France vs Germany ===
The two teams had met in 25 previous matches, including three times in the FIFA World Cup (1958, match for third place: France 6–3 West Germany; 1982 semi-finals: France 3–3 (aet) West Germany, West Germany won 5–4 on penalties; 1986, semi-finals: France 0–2 West Germany).

The only goal came in the 13th minute when Mats Hummels got ahead of his marker Raphaël Varane to head Germany into the lead from ten yards out after a free-kick from Toni Kroos on the left. Karim Benzema had a shot in second half injury time from the left which he hit straight at Manuel Neuer.

Germany advanced to the semi-finals where they would face Brazil. They became the first team to reach four straight World Cup semi-finals, breaking the record of three shared by their predecessor West Germany (1966–1974 and 1982–1990) and Brazil (1970–1978 and 1994–2002). Germany was also guaranteed their 13th top four finish, the most by any nation.

4 July 2014
13:00 BRT (UTC−3)

France	0–1	Germany
		Hummels 13'

Estádio do Maracanã, Rio de Janeiro
Attendance: 74,240
Referee: Néstor Pitana (Argentina)

France	Germany

GK	1	Hugo Lloris (c)
RB	2	Mathieu Debuchy
CB	4	Raphaël Varane
CB	5	Mamadou Sakho	(substituted off) 72'
LB	3	Patrice Evra
CM	19	Paul Pogba
CM	6	Yohan Cabaye	(substituted off) 74'
CM	14	Blaise Matuidi
RW	8	Mathieu Valbuena	(substituted off) 84'
LW	11	Antoine Griezmann
CF	10	Karim Benzema
Substitutions:
DF	21	Laurent Koscielny	(substituted on) 72'
FW	20	Loïc Rémy	(substituted on) 74'
FW	9	Olivier Giroud	(substituted on) 84'
Manager:
Didier Deschamps

GK	1	Manuel Neuer
RB	16	Philipp Lahm (c)
CB	20	Jérôme Boateng
CB	5	Mats Hummels
LB	4	Benedikt Höwedes
CM	7	Bastian Schweinsteiger	(yellow card) 80'
CM	6	Sami Khedira	(yellow card) 54'
RW	13	Thomas Müller
AM	18	Toni Kroos		(substituted off) 90+3'
LW	8	Mesut Özil		(substituted off) 83'
CF	11	Miroslav Klose		(substituted off) 68'
Substitutes:
FW	9	André Schürrle		(substituted on) 68'
MF	19	Mario Götze		(substituted on) 83'
MF	23	Christoph Kramer		(substituted on) 90+3'
Manager:
Joachim Löw

Man of the Match:
Mats Hummels (Germany)

Assistant referees:
Hernán Maidana (Argentina)
Juan Pablo Belatti (Argentina)
Fourth official:
Jonas Eriksson (Sweden)
Fifth official:
Mathias Klasenius (Sweden)

=== Brazil vs Colombia ===
The two teams had met in 25 previous matches, but never in the FIFA World Cup. This was the first time Colombia had reached the quarter-finals of the World Cup. Brazil midfielder Luiz Gustavo was suspended for the match due to accumulation of yellow cards.

Brazil took the lead in the 7th minute, when Neymar's corner from the left was turned in from close range by Thiago Silva. Colombia appeared to have equalised through Mario Yepes in the 66th minute, but it was overturned for offside. Instead, Brazil doubled the lead in the 69th minute when David Luiz scored directly from a long-range free kick, side-footing the ball over the wall and into the top-right corner, despite David Ospina getting fingers on the ball. Colombia reduced the deficit with 10 minutes to go, when James Rodríguez converted a penalty kick low into the left corner and sent the goalkeeper the wrong way. The penalty was awarded after substitute Carlos Bacca was fouled by Brazil goalkeeper Júlio César. Neymar was kneed in the back by Colombia defender Juan Camilo Zúñiga in the 88th minute, which resulted in the striker's withdrawal from the match. Subsequent medical evaluation discovered a fractured vertebra, forcing the Brazilian to miss the remainder of the tournament. Brazil advanced to the semi-final, where they faced Germany.

James's sixth goal of the tournament was enough for him to win the Golden Boot award. He also became the first player to score in his first five career World Cup matches since Peru's Teófilo Cubillas (across the 1970 and 1978 tournaments).

4 July 2014
17:00 BRT (UTC−3)

Brazil	2–1	Colombia
Thiago Silva 7'; David Luiz 69'		Rodríguez 80' (pen.)

Estádio Castelão, Fortaleza
Attendance: 60,342
Referee: Carlos Velasco Carballo (Spain)

Brazil	Colombia

GK	12	Júlio César	(yellow card) 78'
RB	23	Maicon
CB	3	Thiago Silva (c)	(yellow card) 64'
CB	4	David Luiz
LB	6	Marcelo
CM	5	Fernandinho
CM	8	Paulinho		(substituted off) 86'
RW	7	Hulk		(substituted off) 82'
AM	11	Oscar
LW	10	Neymar		(substituted off) 88'
CF	9	Fred
Substitutes:
MF	16	Ramires		(substituted on) 82'
MF	18	Hernanes		(substituted on) 86'
DF	15	Henrique		(substituted on) 88'
Manager:
Luiz Felipe Scolari

GK	1	David Ospina
RB	18	Juan Camilo Zúñiga
CB	2	Cristián Zapata
CB	3	Mario Yepes (c)	(yellow card) 71'
LB	7	Pablo Armero
RM	11	Juan Cuadrado		(substituted off) 80'
CM	13	Fredy Guarín
CM	6	Carlos Sánchez
LM	14	Víctor Ibarbo		(substituted off) 46'
CF	9	Teófilo Gutiérrez		(substituted off) 70'
CF	10	James Rodríguez	(yellow card) 67'
Substitutes:
FW	19	Adrián Ramos		(substituted on) 46'
FW	17	Carlos Bacca		(substituted on) 70'
MF	20	Juan Quintero		(substituted on) 80'
Manager:
(Argentina) José Pékerman

Man of the Match:
David Luiz (Brazil)

Assistant referees:
Roberto Alonso (Spain)
Juan Carlos Yuste (Spain)
Fourth official:
Svein Oddvar Moen (Norway)
Fifth official:
Kim Haglund (Norway)

=== Argentina vs Belgium ===
The two teams had met in three previous matches, including twice in the FIFA World Cup (1982, group stage: Argentina 0–1 Belgium; 1986, semi-finals: Argentina 2–0 Belgium). Argentina defender Marcos Rojo was suspended for the match due to accumulation of yellow cards.

The only goal of the match was scored by Argentina forward Gonzalo Higuaín in the eighth minute, a powerful shot with his right foot from just inside the penalty area after a pass from Di María was deflected to him by Belgium defender Jan Vertonghen. Higuaín had a chance to extend the lead in the second half, but his shot hit the crossbar. Argentina won 1–0 to advance to the semi-finals, where they would face the Netherlands.

5 July 2014
13:00 BRT (UTC−3)

Argentina	1–0	Belgium
Higuaín 8'

Estádio Nacional Mané Garrincha, Brasília
Attendance: 68,551
Referee: Nicola Rizzoli (Italy)

Argentina	Belgium

GK	1	Sergio Romero
RB	4	Pablo Zabaleta
CB	15	Martín Demichelis
CB	2	Ezequiel Garay
LB	23	José María Basanta
CM	6	Lucas Biglia	(yellow card) 75'
CM	14	Javier Mascherano
RW	22	Ezequiel Lavezzi		(substituted off) 71'
LW	7	Ángel Di María		(substituted off) 33'
CF	10	Lionel Messi (c)
CF	9	Gonzalo Higuaín		(substituted off) 81'
Substitutes:
MF	8	Enzo Pérez		(substituted on) 33'
FW	18	Rodrigo Palacio		(substituted on) 71'
MF	5	Fernando Gago		(substituted on) 81'
Manager:
Alejandro Sabella

GK	1	Thibaut Courtois
RB	2	Toby Alderweireld	(yellow card) 69'
CB	15	Daniel Van Buyten
CB	4	Vincent Kompany (c)
LB	5	Jan Vertonghen
CM	6	Axel Witsel
CM	8	Marouane Fellaini
RW	11	Kevin Mirallas		(substituted off) 60'
AM	7	Kevin De Bruyne
LW	10	Eden Hazard	(yellow card) 53'	(substituted off) 75'
CF	17	Divock Origi		(substituted off) 59'
Substitutions:
FW	9	Romelu Lukaku		(substituted on) 59'
FW	14	Dries Mertens		(substituted on) 60'
MF	22	Nacer Chadli		(substituted on) 75'
Manager:
Marc Wilmots

Man of the Match:
Gonzalo Higuaín (Argentina)

Assistant referees:
Renato Faverani (Italy)
Andrea Stefani (Italy)
Fourth official:
Ben Williams (Australia)
Fifth official:
Matthew Cream (Australia)

=== Netherlands vs Costa Rica ===
The two teams had never met before. This was the first time Costa Rica had reached the quarter-finals of the World Cup. Costa Rica defender Óscar Duarte was suspended for the match, after being sent off in the round of 16 match against Greece.

After a goalless 90 minutes, which saw Wesley Sneijder's free kick hit the post and Robin van Persie's shot deflected onto the crossbar by Costa Rica defender Yeltsin Tejeda, the match headed to extra time. In the second period, substitute Marco Ureña had a shot saved by Netherlands goalkeeper Jasper Cillessen, while Sneijder had another shot hit the crossbar. In added time at the end of 120 minutes, Dutch manager Louis van Gaal brought on Tim Krul to replace Cillessen. In the subsequent penalty shoot-out, Krul saved from Bryan Ruiz and Michael Umaña, while the Netherlands scored all four of their kicks to advance to the semi-finals, where they would face Argentina.

Uzbek referee Ravshan Irmatov took charge of his ninth World Cup match, breaking the record of most World Cup games officiated, which he previously held jointly with Joël Quiniou of France, Benito Archundia of Mexico, and Jorge Larrionda of Uruguay.

5 July 2014
17:00 BRT (UTC−3)

Netherlands	0–0 (a.e.t.)	Costa Rica
Penalties
Van Persie (penalty scored); Robben (penalty scored); Sneijder (penalty scored); Kuyt (penalty scored)	4–3	(penalty scored) Borges; (penalty missed) Ruiz; (penalty scored) González; (penalty scored) Bolaños; (penalty missed) Umaña

Itaipava Arena Fonte Nova, Salvador
Attendance: 51,179
Referee: Ravshan Irmatov (Uzbekistan)

Netherlands	Costa Rica

GK	1	Jasper Cillessen		(substituted off) 120+1'
CB	3	Stefan de Vrij
CB	2	Ron Vlaar
CB	4	Bruno Martins Indi	(yellow card) 64'	(substituted off) 106'
RWB	15	Dirk Kuyt
LWB	5	Daley Blind
CM	20	Georginio Wijnaldum
CM	10	Wesley Sneijder
RW	11	Arjen Robben
LW	21	Memphis Depay		(substituted off) 76'
CF	9	Robin van Persie (c)
Substitutions:
MF	17	Jeremain Lens		(substituted on) 76'
FW	19	Klaas-Jan Huntelaar	(yellow card) 111'	(substituted on) 106'
GK	23	Tim Krul		(substituted on) 120+1'
Manager:
Louis van Gaal

GK	1	Keylor Navas
CB	2	Jhonny Acosta	(yellow card) 107'
CB	3	Giancarlo González	(yellow card) 81'
CB	4	Michael Umaña	(yellow card) 52'
RWB	16	Cristian Gamboa		(substituted off) 79'
LWB	15	Júnior Díaz	(yellow card) 37'
CM	17	Yeltsin Tejeda		(substituted off) 97'
CM	5	Celso Borges
RW	10	Bryan Ruiz (c)
LW	7	Christian Bolaños
CF	9	Joel Campbell		(substituted off) 66'
Substitutes:
FW	21	Marco Ureña		(substituted on) 66'
DF	8	David Myrie		(substituted on) 79'
MF	22	José Miguel Cubero		(substituted on) 97'
Manager:
(Colombia) Jorge Luis Pinto

Man of the Match:
Keylor Navas (Costa Rica)

Assistant referees:
Abdukhamidullo Rasulov (Uzbekistan)
Bahadyr Kochkarov (Kyrgyzstan)
Fourth official:
Noumandiez Doué (Ivory Coast)
Fifth official:
Songuifolo Yeo (Ivory Coast)

== Semi-finals ==
=== Brazil vs Germany ===
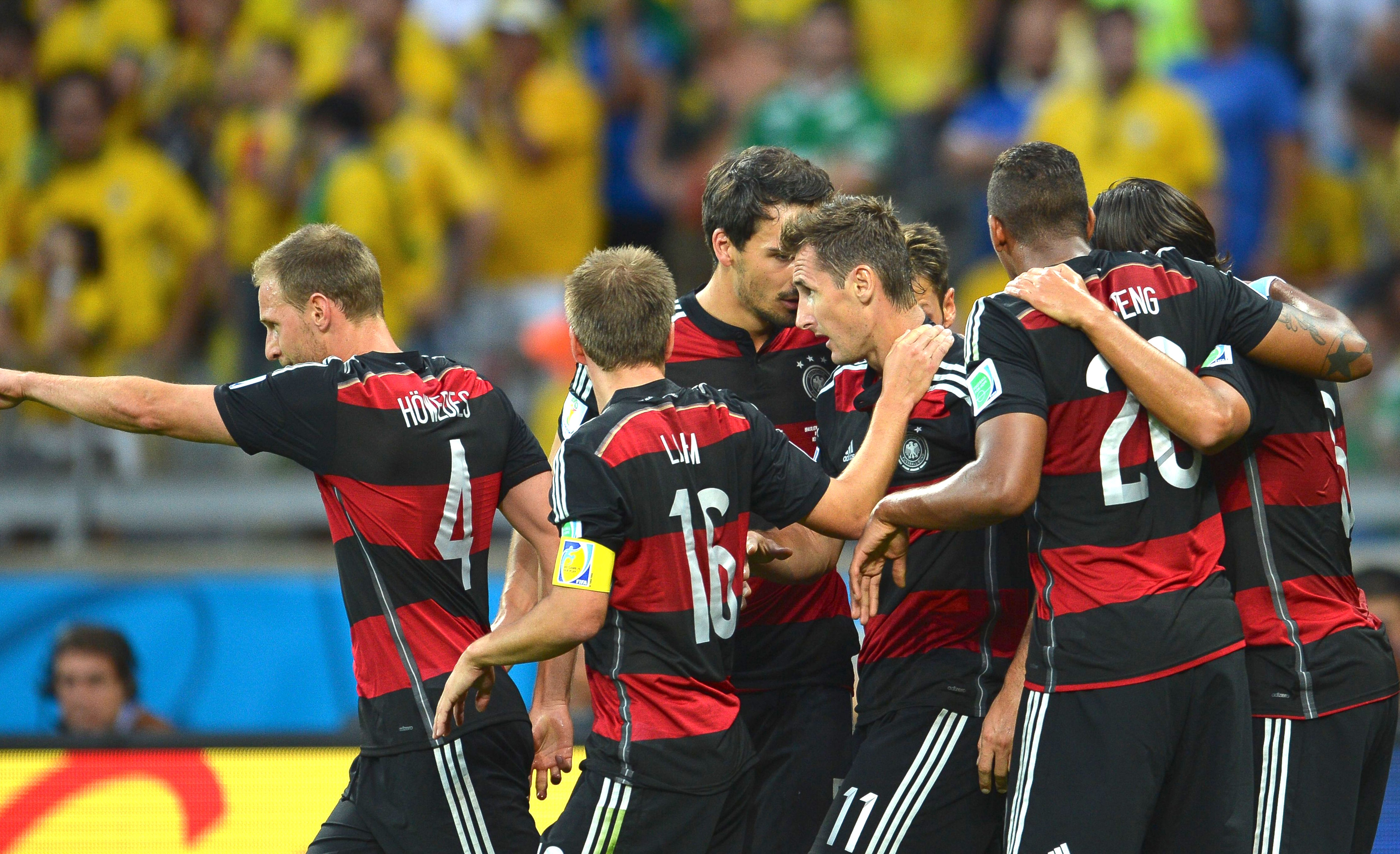
Miroslav Klose (center) celebrating with teammates after scoring the second goal for Germany.

The two teams had met in 21 previous matches, including in the final of the 2002 FIFA World Cup (their only previous encounter in the tournament's history), won by Brazil 2–0.

While Germany kept the same starting line-up as their quarter-final against France, Brazil made two changes: defender and captain Thiago Silva was suspended for the match due to accumulation of yellow cards, and was replaced by Dante, while forward Neymar was sidelined after suffering a fractured vertebra in the quarter-final against Colombia, and was replaced by Bernard. Germany took the lead in the 11th minute, Thomas Müller volleying in Toni Kroos's corner. Miroslav Klose scored Germany's second goal, after a passing move saw him set up by Kroos, his first shot was saved by Brazil goalkeeper Júlio César, but he slotted in the rebound. Kroos then scored two quick goals in succession, the first one after Philipp Lahm's cross was missed by Müller, the second one after stealing the ball from Fernandinho and playing a quick one-two with Sami Khedira. Khedira then scored Germany's fourth goal in six minutes, after exchanging passes with Mesut Özil, to give Germany the 5–0 half-time lead. Substitute André Schürrle added two more goals in the second half, first slotting in from Lahm's cross, then scoring via the crossbar after a cut-back from Müller. Brazil scored a consolation goal in the 90th minute, as Oscar received a pass from Marcelo, dribbled inside and scored. Germany reached their eighth World Cup final, a record by any nation, where they would face Argentina, while Brazil had to settle for the match for third place against the Netherlands.

The game equalled Brazil's biggest margin of defeat, a 6–0 loss to Uruguay in 1920, and it broke a 62-match home unbeaten streak in competitive matches going back to the 1975 Copa América, where they lost 3–1 to Peru in the same exact stadium of this match. The match also broke many World Cup records: It was Brazil's biggest World Cup defeat (eclipsing their 1998 final loss to France), the biggest defeat by a World Cup host nation (previous record was by three goals), and the biggest margin of victory in a World Cup semi-final (three previous semi-finals ended in 6–1 scorelines).

Klose's goal was his 16th at World Cup finals tournaments, allowing him to overtake Brazil's Ronaldo as the tournament's all-time top scorer. Germany's seven goals took their total tally in World Cup history to 223, surpassing Brazil's 221 goals to first place overall.

8 July 2014
17:00 BRT (UTC−3)

Brazil	1–7	Germany
Oscar 89'		Müller 11'; Klose 23'; Kroos 24', 26'; Khedira 29'; Schürrle 69', 79'

Estádio Mineirão, Belo Horizonte
Attendance: 58,141
Referee: Marco Antonio Rodríguez (Mexico)

Brazil	Germany

GK	12	Júlio César
RB	23	Maicon
CB	4	David Luiz (c)
CB	13	Dante	(yellow card) 68'
LB	6	Marcelo
CM	17	Luiz Gustavo
CM	5	Fernandinho		(substituted off) 46'
RW	7	Hulk		(substituted off) 46'
AM	11	Oscar
LW	20	Bernard
CF	9	Fred		(substituted off) 70'
Substitutes:
GK	1	Jefferson
DF	2	Dani Alves
MF	8	Paulinho		(substituted on) 46'
DF	14	Maxwell
DF	15	Henrique
MF	16	Ramires		(substituted on) 46'
MF	18	Hernanes
MF	19	Willian		(substituted on) 70'
FW	21	Jô
GK	22	Victor
Manager:
Luiz Felipe Scolari

GK	1	Manuel Neuer
RB	16	Philipp Lahm (c)
CB	20	Jérôme Boateng
CB	5	Mats Hummels	(substituted off) 46'
LB	4	Benedikt Höwedes
CM	6	Sami Khedira	(substituted off) 76'
CM	7	Bastian Schweinsteiger
RW	13	Thomas Müller
AM	18	Toni Kroos
LW	8	Mesut Özil
CF	11	Miroslav Klose	(substituted off) 58'
Substitutes:
GK	12	Ron-Robert Zieler
DF	2	Kevin Großkreutz
DF	3	Matthias Ginter
FW	9	André Schürrle	(substituted on) 58'
FW	10	Lukas Podolski
MF	14	Julian Draxler	(substituted on) 76'
DF	15	Erik Durm
DF	17	Per Mertesacker	(substituted on) 46'
MF	19	Mario Götze
GK	22	Roman Weidenfeller
MF	23	Christoph Kramer
Manager:
Joachim Löw

Man of the Match:
Toni Kroos (Germany)

Assistant referees:
Marvin Torrentera (Mexico)
Marcos Quintero (Mexico)
Fourth official:
Mark Geiger (United States)
Fifth official:
Mark Hurd (United States)

=== Netherlands vs Argentina ===
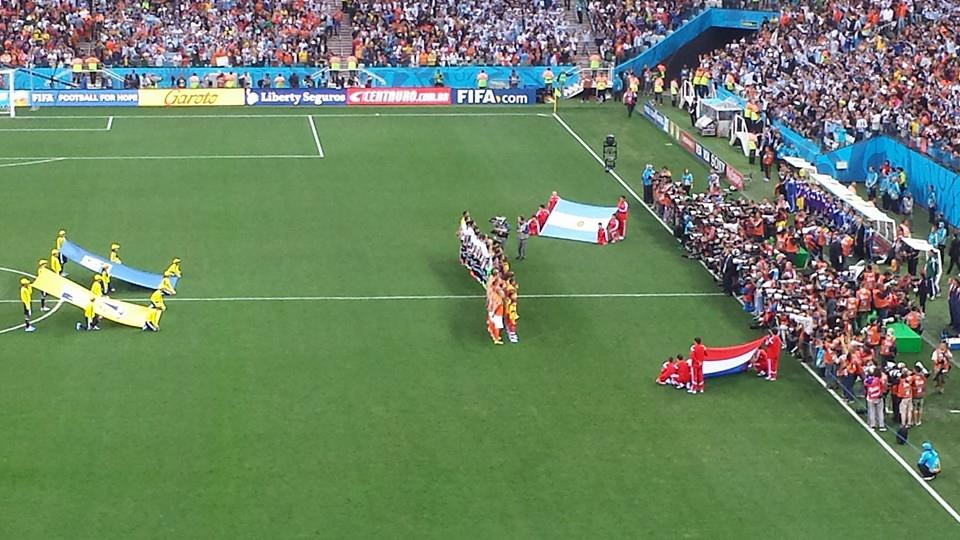
Line-up of the teams before the match

The two teams had met in eight previous matches, including four times in the FIFA World Cup: Netherlands won 4–0 in the second group stage of the 1974 FIFA World Cup and 2–1 in the quarter-finals of the 1998 FIFA World Cup, Argentina won 3–1 (after extra time) in the final of the 1978 FIFA World Cup, whereas a group stage encounter of the 2006 FIFA World Cup ended in a 0–0 draw.

The Netherlands made one change to their starting line-up from their quarter-final, with Nigel de Jong returning from injury to replace Memphis Depay, while Argentina made two changes, with Marcos Rojo returning from suspension to replace José María Basanta and Enzo Pérez replacing the injured Di María. The match finished 0–0 after extra-time with very little chances as both sides cancelled each other out. In the penalty shoot-out, Sergio Romero saved the first penalty from Ron Vlaar diving to his left and the fifth penalty of the shoot-out from Wesley Sneijder when he dived high to his right. Argentina scored all of their four penalties to win 4–2. Maxi Rodríguez scored the decisive fourth penalty, shooting to Dutch goalkeeper Jasper Cillessen's right to send Argentina into the final, where they would face Germany, while the Netherlands had to settle for the match for third place against Brazil.

This was the first World Cup semi-final to end in a goalless draw. Argentina won their fourth World Cup penalty shoot-out, tied with Germany for most wins, and were involved in their fifth World Cup shoot-out, a record for any nation.

9 July 2014
17:00 BRT (UTC−3)

Netherlands	0–0 (a.e.t.)	Argentina
Penalties
Vlaar (penalty missed); Robben (penalty scored); Sneijder (penalty missed); Kuyt (penalty scored)	2–4	(penalty scored) Messi; (penalty scored) Garay; (penalty scored) Agüero; (penalty scored) Rodríguez

Arena Corinthians, São Paulo
Attendance: 63,267
Referee: Cüneyt Çakır (Turkey)

Netherlands	Argentina

GK	1	Jasper Cillessen
CB	3	Stefan de Vrij
CB	2	Ron Vlaar
CB	4	Bruno Martins Indi	(yellow card) 45'	(substituted off) 46'
RWB	15	Dirk Kuyt
LWB	5	Daley Blind
CM	6	Nigel de Jong		(substituted off) 62'
CM	20	Georginio Wijnaldum
AM	10	Wesley Sneijder
CF	11	Arjen Robben
CF	9	Robin van Persie (c)		(substituted off) 96'
Substitutions:
DF	7	Daryl Janmaat		(substituted on) 46'
MF	16	Jordy Clasie		(substituted on) 62'
FW	19	Klaas-Jan Huntelaar	(yellow card) 105'	(substituted on) 96'
Manager:
Louis van Gaal

GK	1	Sergio Romero
RB	4	Pablo Zabaleta
CB	15	Martín Demichelis	(yellow card) 49'
CB	2	Ezequiel Garay
LB	16	Marcos Rojo
CM	6	Lucas Biglia
CM	14	Javier Mascherano
CM	8	Enzo Pérez		(substituted off) 81'
AM	10	Lionel Messi (c)
CF	9	Gonzalo Higuaín		(substituted off) 82'
CF	22	Ezequiel Lavezzi		(substituted off) 101'
Substitutions:
FW	18	Rodrigo Palacio		(substituted on) 81'
FW	20	Sergio Agüero		(substituted on) 82'
MF	11	Maxi Rodríguez		(substituted on) 101'
Manager:
Alejandro Sabella

Man of the Match:
Sergio Romero (Argentina)

Assistant referees:
Bahattin Duran (Turkey)
Tarık Ongun (Turkey)
Fourth official:
Jonas Eriksson (Sweden)
Fifth official:
Mathias Klasenius (Sweden)

== Match for third place ==
The two teams had met in 11 previous meetings, including four times in the FIFA World Cup: Netherlands won 2–0 in the second group stage of the 1974 FIFA World Cup and 2–1 in the quarter-finals of the 2010 FIFA World Cup, and Brazil won 3–2 in the quarter-finals of the 1994 FIFA World Cup and 4–2 on penalties after a 1–1 draw (after extra time) in the semi-finals of the 1998 FIFA World Cup.

Brazil made six changes in their starting line-up from their semi-final, while the Netherlands made only two, with Wesley Sneijder, who was originally part of the Dutch starting line-up, replaced by Jonathan de Guzmán after a hamstring injury during the pre-match warm-up prevented him from playing and Jordy Clasie replacing Nigel de Jong due to a groin injury.

The Netherlands opened the scoring within three minutes, after Van Persie converted a penalty kick awarded for a foul on Arjen Robben by Thiago Silva. Daley Blind extended the lead in the 17th minute, scoring after a David Luiz headed clearance fell to him inside the penalty area. Georginio Wijnaldum completed the scoring in second half injury time as he shot home from substitute Daryl Janmaat's cross from the right, the ball going in off the Brazilian goalkeeper’s foot.

The Netherlands finished third for the first time in their World Cup history. With Michel Vorm's participation (who was substituted into the match in second half injury time), the Netherlands became the first team to use all of their 23 players in a World Cup since the finals squads were expanded from 22 to 23 players in 2002.

Brazil, who finished fourth for the second time in World Cup history, conceded a total of 14 goals in the tournament, the most they had ever allowed in a World Cup and also the most conceded by any World Cup hosts. Brazil also became the second team to concede 100 World Cup goals, after Germany.

Van Persie's goal was the 100th goal that Brazil had conceded in the FIFA World Cup and made him the second highest Dutch goalscorer with six World Cup goals along with Wesley Sneijder, Arjen Robben, Dennis Bergkamp, and Rob Rensenbrink, all behind Johnny Rep on seven.

Lastly, since the beginning of the 21st century, all four World Cups in 2002, 2006, 2010 and 2014 involved the third-place victors scoring three goals.

12 July 2014
17:00 BRT (UTC−3)

Brazil	0–3	Netherlands
		Van Persie 3' (pen.); Blind 17'; Wijnaldum 90+1'

Estádio Nacional Mané Garrincha, Brasília
Attendance: 68,034
Referee: Djamel Haimoudi (Algeria)

Brazil	Netherlands

GK	12	Júlio César
RB	23	Maicon
CB	3	Thiago Silva (c)	(yellow card) 2'
CB	4	David Luiz
LB	14	Maxwell
CM	8	Paulinho		(substituted off) 57'
CM	17	Luiz Gustavo		(substituted off) 46'
RW	16	Ramires		(substituted off) 73'
AM	11	Oscar	(yellow card) 68'
LW	19	Willian
CF	21	Jô
Substitutions:
MF	5	Fernandinho	(yellow card) 54'	(substituted on) 46'
MF	18	Hernanes		(substituted on) 57'
FW	7	Hulk		(substituted on) 73'
Manager:
Luiz Felipe Scolari

GK	1	Jasper Cillessen		(substituted off) 90+3'
CB	3	Stefan de Vrij
CB	2	Ron Vlaar
CB	4	Bruno Martins Indi
RWB	15	Dirk Kuyt
LWB	5	Daley Blind		(substituted off) 70'
CM	20	Georginio Wijnaldum
CM	16	Jordy Clasie		(substituted off) 90'
CM	8	Jonathan de Guzmán	(yellow card) 36'
CF	9	Robin van Persie (c)
CF	11	Arjen Robben	(yellow card) 9'
Substitutions:
DF	7	Daryl Janmaat		(substituted on) 70'
DF	13	Joël Veltman		(substituted on) 90'
GK	22	Michel Vorm		(substituted on) 90+3'
Manager:
Louis van Gaal

Man of the Match:
Arjen Robben (Netherlands)

Assistant referees:
Rédouane Achik (Morocco)
Abdelhak Etchiali (Algeria)
Fourth official:
Yuichi Nishimura (Japan)
Fifth official:
Toru Sagara (Japan)

== Final ==
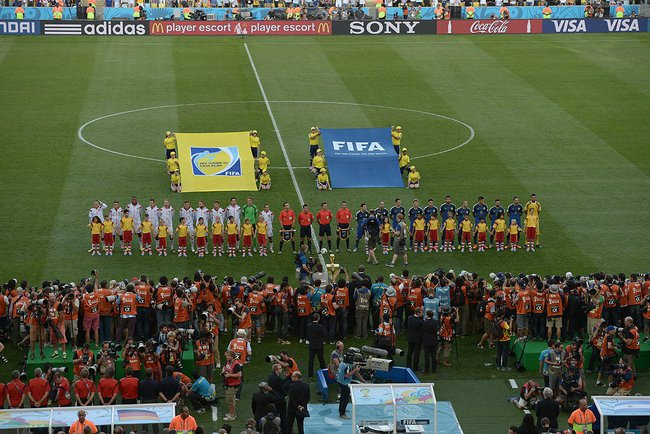
Germany–Argentina line-up before kick-off

The two teams had met in 20 previous matches, including six times in the FIFA World Cup: 1958, group stage: West Germany 3–1 Argentina; 1966, group stage: West Germany 0–0 Argentina; 1986, final: West Germany 2–3 Argentina; 1990, final: West Germany 1–0 Argentina; 2006, quarter-finals: Germany 1–1 Argentina (after extra time, Germany won 4–2 on penalties); 2010 FIFA World Cup, quarter-finals: Germany 4–0 Argentina. Their third final meeting is the most ever in World Cup history, and also tied the record for the most frequent fixture in tournament history, as Brazil vs Sweden and Germany vs Serbia (including Yugoslavia) had also been played seven times in the World Cup.

Both teams initially named unchanged starting line-ups from their semi-finals, but Germany had to make a late change as Sami Khedira injured his calf and was replaced by Christoph Kramer, who was himself substituted in the first half by André Schürrle after a blow to his head. In the first half, Gonzalo Higuaín shot wide after a Toni Kroos's misplaced header fell to him, and also had a goal disallowed for offside. Later, Jérôme Boateng cleared off the line after a Lionel Messi run, and Benedikt Höwedes's header hit the post. In the second half, Argentina's best chance fell to Messi, whose shot went just wide, while Toni Kroos also had a chance for Germany but could not convert. For the third World Cup final in a row, the match went to extra time. In the first half, Schürrle had a shot saved by Sergio Romero, while Rodrigo Palacio's lobbed shot was also unsuccessful. Germany scored the only goal in the second half, as Schürrle ran down the left wing and crossed for substitute Mario Götze, who controlled the ball on his chest and volleyed past Romero.

Germany won their fourth World Cup title, and their first title since German reunification (they won as West Germany in 1954, 1974, and 1990). It was the first time a European team won the tournament in the Americas. For the third tournament in a row, the World Cup was won by a European team, first time for any confederation. Argentina finished as the runners-up for the third time in their history.

A total of 171 goals were scored in the tournament, a joint record along with the 1998 FIFA World Cup. Götze's goal was the 32nd by a substitute, a World Cup record. Including the final, a total of eight matches went to extra time, a joint record along with the 1990 FIFA World Cup.

13 July 2014
16:00 BRT (UTC−3)

Germany	1–0 (a.e.t.)	Argentina
Götze 113'

Maracanã Stadium, Rio de Janeiro
Attendance: 74,738
Referee: Nicola Rizzoli (Italy)

Germany	Argentina

GK	1	Manuel Neuer
RB	16	Philipp Lahm (c)
CB	20	Jérôme Boateng
CB	5	Mats Hummels
LB	4	Benedikt Höwedes	(yellow card) 34'
RM	23	Christoph Kramer		(substituted off) 32'
CM	7	Bastian Schweinsteiger	(yellow card) 29'
LM	18	Toni Kroos
RF	13	Thomas Müller
CF	11	Miroslav Klose		(substituted off) 88'
LF	8	Mesut Özil		(substituted off) 120'
Substitutions:
FW	9	André Schürrle		(substituted on) 32'
MF	19	Mario Götze		(substituted on) 88'
DF	17	Per Mertesacker		(substituted on) 120'
Manager:
Joachim Löw

GK	1	Sergio Romero
RB	4	Pablo Zabaleta
CB	15	Martín Demichelis
CB	2	Ezequiel Garay
LB	16	Marcos Rojo
CM	14	Javier Mascherano	(yellow card) 64'
CM	6	Lucas Biglia
RW	8	Enzo Pérez		(substituted off) 86'
AM	10	Lionel Messi (c)
LW	22	Ezequiel Lavezzi		(substituted off) 46'
CF	9	Gonzalo Higuaín		(substituted off) 78'
Substitutions:
FW	20	Sergio Agüero	(yellow card) 65'	(substituted on) 46'
FW	18	Rodrigo Palacio		(substituted on) 78'
MF	5	Fernando Gago		(substituted on) 86'
Manager:
Alejandro Sabella

Man of the Match:
Mario Götze (Germany)

Assistant referees:
Renato Faverani (Italy)
Andrea Stefani (Italy)
Fourth official:
Carlos Vera (Ecuador)
Fifth official:
Christian Lescano (Ecuador)

== See also ==
- 2014 Gaza war beach bombings – attacks on football fans watching the 2014 FIFA World Cup knockout stage
