= Battle of Nuremberg (2006 FIFA World Cup) =

Football match between Portugal and the Netherlands

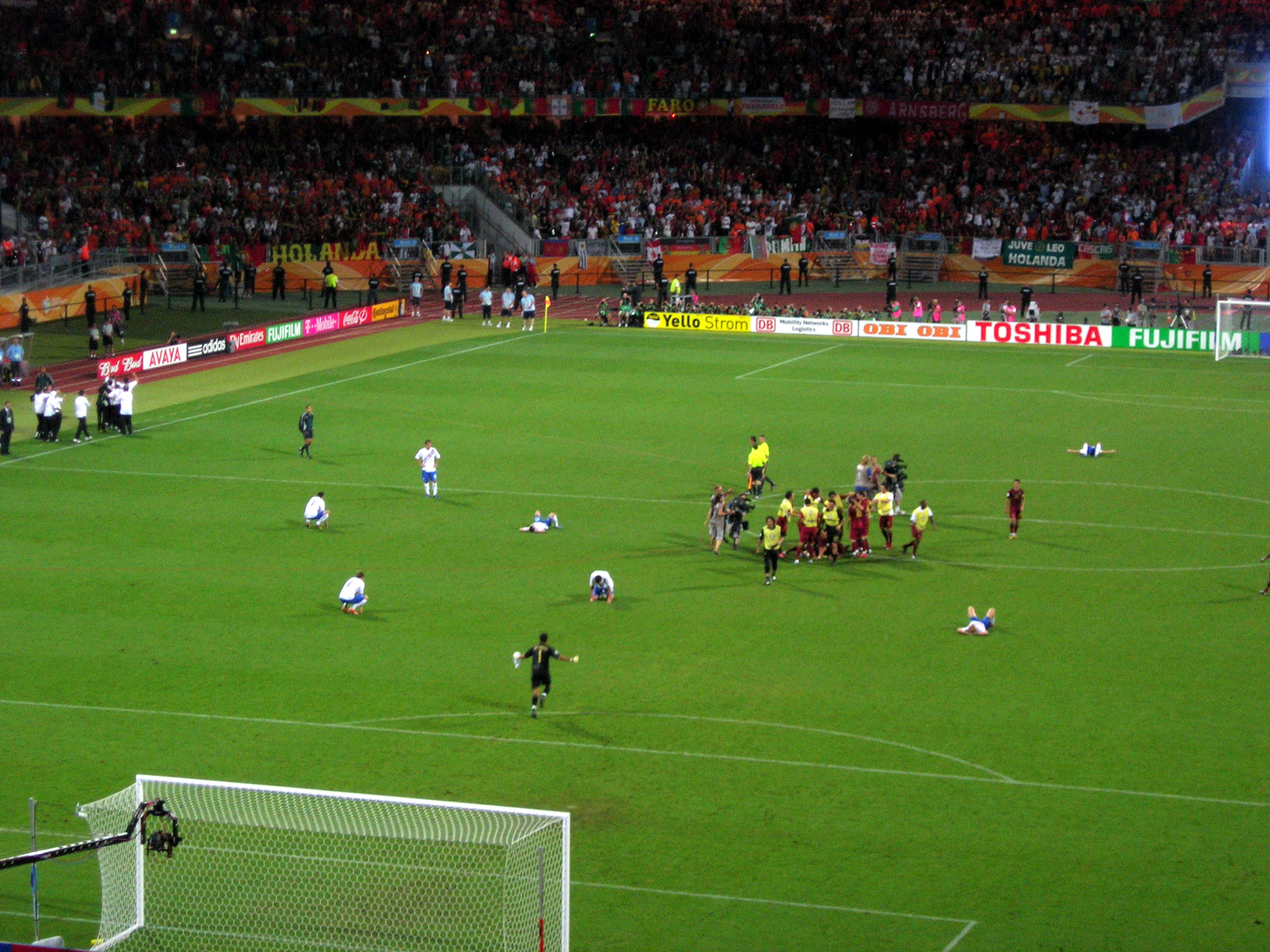
- The pitch at the Frankenstadion after the match
- Event: 2006 FIFA World Cup; Round of 16
Portugal	Netherlands
(Portugal)	(Netherlands)
1	0
- Date: 25 June 2006
- Venue: Frankenstadion, Nuremberg, Germany
- Man of the Match: Maniche
- Referee: Valentin Ivanov (Russia)
- Attendance: 41,000
- Weather: Mostly cloudy 26 °C (79 °F)

The Battle of Nuremberg, also known as the Massacre of Nuremberg, is the nickname of a football match played in the round of 16 of the 2006 FIFA World Cup between Portugal and the Netherlands at the Frankenstadion in Nuremberg, Germany on 25 June 2006. Russian referee Valentin Ivanov issued four red cards and 16 yellow cards, setting a new record for the number of cards shown at a FIFA-administered international tournament. It remains the World Cup match with the most cards shown in 90 minutes.

== Background ==
Portugal and the Netherlands had met at the semi-final stage of the previous major tournament, UEFA Euro 2004 held in Portugal, which had finished 2–1 to the host nation, but had not featured the same level of animosity between the players. A total of five Dutch and eleven Portuguese players who took some part in that fixture were also on the field in Nuremberg.

== Match ==
=== Summary ===
==== First half ====
Mark van Bommel was booked in the second minute, and also before the goal Dutch defender Khalid Boulahrouz was booked for a foul, which injured Cristiano Ronaldo and would eventually force the substitution of Portugal's star winger before half time. Ronaldo left in tears, and proceeded to describe Boulahrouz's tackle as "clearly an intentional foul to get me injured." In the meantime, Maniche had been booked for a foul on Van Bommel after 19 minutes.

Shortly after Maniche's 23rd minute goal, Portugal's defensive midfielder Costinha slid into Dutch veteran Phillip Cocu, receiving a yellow card. He was then the first to be sent off just before half time after being shown a second yellow card for a handball.

==== Second half ====
After Petit had been cautioned in the 50th minute, Giovanni van Bronckhorst and Luís Figo both received yellow cards, with Figo's coming as a result of a touchline melee with Mark van Bommel during which Figo headbutted him. Portugal manager Luiz Felipe Scolari controversially gave his approval to this headbutt by stating after the match, "Jesus Christ may be able to turn the other cheek but Luís Figo isn't Jesus Christ."

Boulahrouz was sent off in the 63rd minute with a second caution after fouling Figo, which sparked a melee on the touch-line, involving Boulahrouz (who confronted Simão), André Ooijer and the Portuguese bench, necessitating the intervention of the fourth official Marco Rodríguez. Portugal's playmaker Deco roughly fouled Dutch defender John Heitinga and was booked; the Netherlands had not given the ball back after Portugal had cleared it into touch to allow a player to receive medical treatment, thus breaking one of football's gentlemen's agreements. In the ensuing brawl, Wesley Sneijder pushed Petit to the ground and was also cautioned. The Netherlands' Rafael van der Vaart received a yellow card, apparently for dissent.

After that, Portugal's goalkeeper Ricardo (presumably for time wasting) and left-back Nuno Valente (for a killing foul) were punished. Deco received his second caution and was dismissed in the 78th minute for delaying the restart after a free-kick was awarded. Cocu escaped a caution for wrestling Deco to the ground in his attempt to retrieve the ball. In the 88th minute, Simão drew the ire of the Dutch goalkeeper Edwin van der Sar, after the Portuguese player's leg made contact with the Dutchman's in his attempt to score a goal, but the referee decided against taking any disciplinary action. In injury time, Van Bronckhorst was sent off for a second yellow card for a foul on Tiago.

A scene was shown on television footage during the match in which Boulahrouz, Deco, and Van Bronckhorst were sitting together on the sidelines after being sent off, the latter two having a discussion, both being teammates at Spanish club Barcelona. Commentator Gary Bloom referred to the scene as the "Bad boys' corner".

=== Details ===
25 June 2006
21:00

Portugal	1–0	Netherlands
Maniche 23'

Frankenstadion, Nuremberg
Attendance: 41,000
Referee: Valentin Ivanov (Russia)

Portugal	Netherlands

GK	1	Ricardo	(yellow card) 76'
RB	13	Miguel
CB	5	Fernando Meira
CB	16	Ricardo Carvalho
LB	14	Nuno Valente	(yellow card) 76'
CM	6	Costinha	(yellow card) 31' (yellow-red card) 45+1'
CM	18	Maniche	(yellow card) 20'
RW	7	Luís Figo (c)	(yellow card) 60'	(substituted off) 84'
AM	20	Deco	(yellow card) 73' (yellow-red card) 78'
LW	17	Cristiano Ronaldo		(substituted off) 34'
CF	9	Pauleta		(substituted off) 46'
Substitutions:
FW	11	Simão		(substituted on) 34'
MF	8	Petit	(yellow card) 50'	(substituted on) 46'
MF	19	Tiago		(substituted on) 84'
Manager:
(Brazil) Luiz Felipe Scolari

GK	1	Edwin van der Sar (c)
RB	3	Khalid Boulahrouz	(yellow card) 7' (yellow-red card) 63'
CB	13	André Ooijer
CB	4	Joris Mathijsen		(substituted off) 56'
LB	5	Giovanni van Bronckhorst	(yellow card) 59' (yellow-red card) 90+5'
CM	18	Mark van Bommel	(yellow card) 2'	(substituted off) 67'
CM	20	Wesley Sneijder	(yellow card) 73'
CM	8	Phillip Cocu		(substituted off) 84'
RW	17	Robin van Persie
CF	7	Dirk Kuyt
LW	11	Arjen Robben
Substitutions:
MF	10	Rafael van der Vaart	(yellow card) 74'	(substituted on) 56'
DF	14	John Heitinga		(substituted on) 67'
FW	19	Jan Vennegoor of Hesselink		(substituted on) 84'
Manager:
Marco van Basten

Man of the Match:
Maniche (Portugal)

Assistant referees:
Nikolay Golubev (Russia)
Evgeni Volnin (Russia)
Fourth official:
Marco Rodríguez (Mexico)
Fifth official:
José Luis Camargo (Mexico)

Match rules:

- 90 minutes
- 30 minutes of extra time if scores level
- Penalty shoot-out if scores still level
- Of 12 substitutes named, three may be used

== Aftermath ==
External videos
- Battle of Nuremberg, YouTube video by FIFA

In the aftermath of the match, referee Ivanov was criticised by FIFA president Sepp Blatter, who suggested that Ivanov should have given himself a yellow card for his poor performance during the match. Blatter later regretted these words and promised to apologise officially. FIFA announced that Ivanov would referee no further matches in the tournament. Ivanov's father Valentin Ivanov defended his son, saying it had been FIFA's demand for referees to be tough on the players.

When Portugal faced England in the subsequent quarter-final, they were without the suspended Deco and Costinha. Portugal managed to reach the semi-finals. However, they had two players suspended for that match due to accumulated yellow cards, including the ones against the Netherlands.

The record for yellow cards in a World Cup game was surpassed in 2022, when Antonio Mateu Lahoz issued a total of 18 yellows (16 for players, one sent off for two yellow cards and 2 more to coaching staff) during the quarter-final match between the Netherlands and Argentina. However, the record was broken during extra time, meaning that the record still stood for most cards shown in 90 minutes of a World Cup match.

== See also ==
- 2006 FIFA World Cup disciplinary record
- Battle of Berne
- Battle of Bordeaux
- Battle of Lusail
- Battle of Santiago
- List of FIFA World Cup records
- Controversy - Portugal vs. Netherlands (round of 16)
- Netherlands at the FIFA World Cup
- Portugal at the FIFA World Cup
