= Gary Bloom =

British sports psychotherapist and broadcaster

- Education: University of Wales
- Occupations: Sports psychotherapist; Sports broadcaster; Commentator; Host

Gary Bloom is a Welsh clinical sports psychotherapist and a sports broadcaster. As a commentator, Bloom has provided his commentary mainly in the World Cup and the Olympics. For many seasons, Bloom was a commentator on the Football Italia programme on Channel 4. Bloom hosts the award-winning show "On the Sporting Couch" on Talksport radio, and is the main commentator of the DLS game series. As a psychotherapist, Bloom works for Oxford United and is the only psychotherapist working in first team professional football.

Bloom was the commentator during the Portugal vs Netherlands match in the 2006 World Cup, also known as the "Battle of Nuremberg", in which he referred to the scene of Khalid Boulahrouz, Deco and Giovanni van Bronckhorst sitting together on the sidelines after being sent off as the "Bad boys' corner". He also commentated the matches between Germany and Argentina (Quarterfinals) and Germany vs Italy (semifinals) alongside Rodney Marsh.

== Education ==
Bloom holds a postgraduate diploma in Psychotherapy and a BA honours from the University of Wales.
