= 1998 FIFA World Cup Group E =

Football tournament group stage

Group E was one of eight groups at the 1998 FIFA World Cup into which the 32 teams were divided. Mexico and the Netherlands qualified after they both beat South Korea and drew with Belgium before drawing with each other. The Netherlands' five goals against South Korea put them top on goal difference. Belgium could have qualified with a big win in their final game against South Korea, who were already out, but they only managed a draw and were eliminated.

== Standings ==
Pos	Team	Pld	W	D	L	GF	GA	GD	Pts	Qualification
1	Netherlands	3	1	2	0	7	2	+5	5	Advance to knockout stage
2	Mexico	3	1	2	0	7	5	+2	5	Advance to knockout stage
3	Belgium	3	0	3	0	3	3	0	3	
4	South Korea	3	0	1	2	2	9	−7	1	

Source: FIFA
- Netherlands advanced to play Yugoslavia (runner-up of Group F) in the round of 16.
- Mexico advanced to play Germany (winner of Group F) in the round of 16.

== Matches ==
=== South Korea vs Mexico ===
13 June 1998
17:30 CEST (UTC+2)

South Korea	1–3	Mexico
Ha Seok-ju 27'		Peláez 50'; Hernández 75', 84'

Stade de Gerland, Lyon
Attendance: 39,100
Referee: Günter Benkö (Austria)

South Korea	Mexico

GK	1	Kim Byung-ji
DF	5	Lee Min-sung	(yellow card) 20'
DF	6	Yoo Sang-chul (c)
MF	7	Kim Do-keun		(substituted off) 60'
MF	8	Noh Jung-yoon		(substituted off) 55'
FW	9	Kim Do-hoon
DF	13	Kim Tae-young
MF	14	Ko Jong-soo		(substituted off) 75'
MF	15	Lee Sang-yoon
MF	17	Ha Seok-ju	(red card) 30'
DF	20	Hong Myung-bo
Substitutions:
DF	16	Jang Hyung-seok		(substituted on) 55'
MF	2	Choi Sung-yong		(substituted on) 60'
FW	11	Seo Jung-won		(substituted on) 75'
Manager:
Cha Bum-kun

GK	1	Jorge Campos
RB	13	Pável Pardo
CB	2	Claudio Suárez
CB	5	Duilio Davino
LB	19	Braulio Luna		(substituted off) 45'
RM	20	Jaime Ordiales	(yellow card) 26'	(substituted off) 45'
CM	14	Raúl Lara
CM	8	Alberto García Aspe (c)	(yellow card) 27'	(substituted off) 71'
LM	7	Ramón Ramírez
CF	11	Cuauhtémoc Blanco
CF	15	Luis Hernández
Substitutions:
FW	9	Ricardo Peláez		(substituted on) 45'
MF	21	Jesús Arellano		(substituted on) 45'
MF	6	Marcelino Bernal		(substituted on) 71'
Manager:
Manuel Lapuente

Assistant referees:
Lencie Fred (Vanuatu)
Eric Schneider (Germany)
Fourth official:
John Toro Lendon (Colombia)

=== Netherlands vs Belgium ===
This fixture was a repeat of the two teams' second match at the 1994 tournament, won by Belgium.

13 June 1998
21:00 CEST (UTC+2)

Netherlands	0–0	Belgium

Stade de France, Saint-Denis
Attendance: 77,000
Referee: Pierluigi Collina (Italy)

Netherlands	Belgium

GK	1	Edwin van der Sar
RB	20	Aron Winter
CB	3	Jaap Stam
CB	4	Frank de Boer (c)
LB	5	Arthur Numan
CM	11	Phillip Cocu
CM	10	Clarence Seedorf		(substituted off) 65'
RW	7	Ronald de Boer		(substituted off) 80'
LW	14	Marc Overmars
CF	9	Patrick Kluivert	(red card) 80'
CF	21	Jimmy Floyd Hasselbaink		(substituted off) 65'
Substitutions:
MF	12	Boudewijn Zenden		(substituted on) 65'
FW	8	Dennis Bergkamp		(substituted on) 65'
MF	6	Wim Jonk		(substituted on) 80'
Manager:
Guus Hiddink

GK	1	Filip De Wilde
RB	2	Bertrand Crasson		(substituted off) 22'
CB	3	Lorenzo Staelens	(yellow card) 20'
CB	17	Mike Verstraeten
LB	5	Vital Borkelmans
DM	6	Franky Van der Elst (c)
DM	15	Philippe Clement
AM	7	Marc Wilmots
AM	21	Danny Boffin
CF	8	Luís Oliveira		(substituted off) 60'
CF	10	Luc Nilis
Substitutions:
DF	22	Éric Deflandre	(yellow card) 29'	(substituted on) 22'
FW	20	Émile Mpenza		(substituted on) 60'
Manager:
Georges Leekens

Assistant referees:
Gennaro Mazzei (Italy)
Emanuel Zammit (Malta)
Fourth official:
Ramesh Ramdhan (Trinidad and Tobago)

=== Belgium vs Mexico ===
20 June 1998
17:30 CEST (UTC+2)

Belgium	2–2	Mexico
Wilmots 42', 47'		García Aspe 55' (pen.); Blanco 62'

Parc Lescure, Bordeaux
Attendance: 31,800
Referee: Hugh Dallas (Scotland)

Belgium	Mexico

GK	1	Filip De Wilde
DF	3	Lorenzo Staelens
DF	4	Gordan Vidović	(yellow card) 68'
DF	5	Vital Borkelmans
MF	6	Franky Van der Elst (c)		(substituted off) 67'
MF	7	Marc Wilmots
FW	8	Luís Oliveira
FW	10	Luc Nilis		(substituted off) 77'
MF	14	Enzo Scifo
MF	21	Danny Boffin		(substituted off) 17'
DF	22	Éric Deflandre
Substitutions:
FW	18	Gert Verheyen	(red card) 54'	(substituted on) 17'
DF	16	Glen De Boeck		(substituted on) 67'
FW	20	Émile Mpenza		(substituted on) 77'
Manager:
Georges Leekens

GK	1	Jorge Campos
CB	2	Claudio Suárez
CB	3	Joel Sánchez
CB	5	Duilio Davino
RM	13	Pável Pardo	(red card) 28'
CM	20	Jaime Ordiales		(substituted off) 57'
CM	8	Alberto García Aspe (c)		(substituted off) 67'
LM	7	Ramón Ramírez	(yellow card) 39'
RF	11	Cuauhtémoc Blanco	(yellow card) 47'
CF	17	Francisco Palencia		(substituted off) 45'
LF	15	Luis Hernández
Substitutions:
LM	21	Jesús Arellano		(substituted on) 45'
CM	4	Germán Villa		(substituted on) 57'
CM	14	Raúl Lara		(substituted on) 67'
Manager:
Manuel Lapuente

Assistant referees:
Eddie Foley (Ireland)
Mohamed Al Musawi (Oman)
Fourth official:
Javier Castrilli (Argentina)

=== Netherlands vs South Korea ===
20 June 1998
21:00 CEST (UTC+2)

Netherlands	5–0	South Korea
Cocu 37'; Overmars 41'; Bergkamp 71'; Van Hooijdonk 80'; R. de Boer 83'

Stade Vélodrome, Marseille
Attendance: 55,000
Referee: Ryszard Wójcik (Poland)

Netherlands	South Korea

GK	1	Edwin van der Sar
RB	20	Aron Winter
CB	3	Jaap Stam
CB	4	Frank de Boer (c)
LB	5	Arthur Numan	(substituted off) 80'
RM	6	Wim Jonk
CM	16	Edgar Davids
LM	11	Phillip Cocu
RW	7	Ronald de Boer	(substituted off) 84'
LW	14	Marc Overmars
CF	8	Dennis Bergkamp	(substituted off) 78'
Substitutions:
FW	17	Pierre van Hooijdonk	(substituted on) 78'
DF	15	Winston Bogarde	(substituted on) 80'
MF	12	Boudewijn Zenden	(substituted on) 84'
Manager:
Guus Hiddink

GK	1	Kim Byung-ji
MF	2	Choi Sung-yong		(substituted off) 53'
DF	4	Choi Young-il (c)
DF	5	Lee Min-sung
DF	6	Yoo Sang-chul
MF	7	Kim Do-keun
FW	9	Kim Do-hoon		(substituted off) 69'
FW	10	Choi Yong-soo	(yellow card) 26'
FW	11	Seo Jung-won		(substituted off) 77'
MF	15	Lee Sang-yoon
DF	20	Hong Myung-bo
Substitutions:
DF	13	Kim Tae-young		(substituted on) 53'
MF	14	Ko Jong-soo	(yellow card) 90+2'	(substituted on) 69'
FW	21	Lee Dong-gook		(substituted on) 77'
Manager:
Cha Bum-kun

Assistant referees:
Jacek Pocięgiel (Poland)
Yuri Dupanov (Belarus)
Fourth official:
Vitor Melo Pereira (Portugal)

=== Netherlands vs Mexico ===
25 June 1998
16:00 CEST (UTC+2)

Netherlands	2–2	Mexico
Cocu 4'; R. de Boer 18'		Peláez 75'; Hernández 90+4'

Stade Geoffroy-Guichard, Saint-Étienne
Attendance: 30,600
Referee: Abdul Rahman Al-Zeid (Saudi Arabia)

Netherlands	Mexico

GK	1	Edwin van der Sar
RB	2	Michael Reiziger
CB	3	Jaap Stam	(yellow card) 21'
CB	4	Frank de Boer (c)
LB	5	Arthur Numan	(yellow card) 46'	(substituted off) 71'
RM	6	Wim Jonk		(substituted off) 70'
CM	16	Edgar Davids
LM	11	Phillip Cocu
RW	7	Ronald de Boer
LW	14	Marc Overmars
CF	8	Dennis Bergkamp		(substituted off) 78'
Substitutions:
MF	20	Aron Winter		(substituted on) 70'
DF	15	Winston Bogarde		(substituted on) 71'
FW	21	Jimmy Floyd Hasselbaink		(substituted on) 78'
Manager:
Guus Hiddink

GK	1	Jorge Campos
RB	18	Salvador Carmona	(yellow card) 58'
CB	3	Joel Sánchez		(substituted off) 55'
CB	2	Claudio Suárez
CB	5	Duilio Davino
LB	19	Braulio Luna		(substituted off) 45'
RM	8	Alberto García Aspe (c)
CM	4	Germán Villa	(yellow card) 18'
LM	7	Ramón Ramírez	(red card) 89'
RF	11	Cuauhtémoc Blanco
LF	15	Luis Hernández	(yellow card) 46'
Substitutions:
LM	21	Jesús Arellano		(substituted on) 45'
CF	9	Ricardo Peláez	(yellow card) 68'	(substituted on) 55'
Manager:
Manuel Lapuente

Assistant referees:
Fernando Tresaco Garcia (Spain)
Hussain Ghadanfari (Kuwait)
Fourth official:
Rune Pedersen (Norway)

=== Belgium vs South Korea ===
25 June 1998
16:00 CEST (UTC+2)

Belgium	1–1	South Korea
Nilis 7'		Yoo Sang-chul 72'

Parc des Princes, Paris
Attendance: 45,500
Referee: Márcio Rezende de Freitas (Brazil)

Belgium	South Korea

GK	12	Philippe Vande Walle
DF	3	Lorenzo Staelens
DF	4	Gordan Vidović
DF	5	Vital Borkelmans	(yellow card) 65'
MF	7	Marc Wilmots
FW	8	Luís Oliveira		(substituted off) 45'
FW	10	Luc Nilis
MF	11	Nico Van Kerckhoven
MF	14	Enzo Scifo (c)		(substituted off) 65'
MF	15	Philippe Clement		(substituted off) 74'
DF	22	Éric Deflandre
Substitutions:
FW	9	Mbo Mpenza		(substituted on) 45'
MF	6	Franky Van der Elst		(substituted on) 65'
FW	20	Émile Mpenza		(substituted on) 74'
Manager:
Georges Leekens

GK	1	Kim Byung-ji	(yellow card) 83'
MF	2	Choi Sung-yong		(substituted off) 45'
DF	5	Lee Min-sung	(yellow card) 83'
DF	6	Yoo Sang-chul (c)
MF	7	Kim Do-keun		(substituted off) 45'
FW	10	Choi Yong-soo
FW	11	Seo Jung-won
DF	12	Lee Sang-hun		(substituted off) 66'
DF	13	Kim Tae-young	(yellow card) 48'
MF	17	Ha Seok-ju
DF	20	Hong Myung-bo
Substitutions:
DF	3	Lee Lim-saeng	(yellow card) 67'	(substituted on) 45'
MF	14	Ko Jong-soo		(substituted on) 45'
DF	16	Jang Hyung-seok		(substituted on) 66'
Manager:
Kim Pyung-seok (caretaker)

Assistant referees:
Arnaldo Pinto (Brazil)
Jorge Luis Arango (Colombia)
Fourth official:
Kim Milton Nielsen (Denmark)

== See also ==
- Belgium at the FIFA World Cup
- Mexico at the FIFA World Cup
- Netherlands at the FIFA World Cup
- South Korea at the FIFA World Cup
