= Jang Hyung-seok =

South Korean footballer (born 1972)

Jang Hyung-Seok 장형석
Personal information
- Full name: Jang Hyung-Seok
- Date of birth: July 7, 1972 (age 54)
- Place of birth: South Korea
- Height: 1.81 m (5 ft 11 1/2 in)
- Position: Defender

Team information
- Current team: BJFC

Senior career*
Years	Team	Apps	(Gls)
1992–1999	Ulsan Hyundai Horang-i	78	(6)
1999–2001	Anyang LG Cheetahs	7	(0)
2002	Bucheon SK	10	(0)
Total		95	(6)

International career
1997–1998	South Korea	10	(1)

Managerial career
- 2003–2006: Yeonhwa Elementary School
- 2007–: BJFC (Coach)
- * Club domestic league appearances and goals

Jang Hyung-Seok (born 7 July 1972) is a South Korean football player.

He played for several clubs, including Ulsan Hyundai Horang-i, Anyang LG Cheetahs and Bucheon SK.

He played for the South Korea national football team and was a participant at the 1998 FIFA World Cup.

== Club career statistics ==
Club performance			League		Cup		League Cup		Continental		Total	
Season	Club	League	Apps	Goals	Apps	Goals	Apps	Goals	Apps	Goals	Apps	Goals
South Korea			League		KFA Cup		League Cup		Asia		Total	
1992	Ulsan Hyundai Horang-i	K-League	8	1	-		4	0	-		12	1
1993	Ulsan Hyundai Horang-i	K-League	1	0	-		0	0	-		1	0
1994	Ulsan Hyundai Horang-i	K-League	0	0	-		0	0	-		0	0
1995	Ulsan Hyundai Horang-i	K-League	3	0	-		0	0	-		3	0
1996	Ulsan Hyundai Horang-i	K-League	26	5	?	?	2	0	?	?		
1997	Ulsan Hyundai Horang-i	K-League	12	0	?	?	13	1	?	?		
1998	Ulsan Hyundai Horang-i	K-League	15	0	?	?	3	0	?	?		
1999	Ulsan Hyundai Horang-i	K-League	13	0	?	?	8	1	-			
1999	Anyang LG Cheetahs	K-League	7	0	?	?	3	0	?	?		
2000	Anyang LG Cheetahs	K-League	0	0	?	?	0	0	?	?		
2001	Anyang LG Cheetahs	K-League	0	0	?	?	0	0	?	?		
2002	Bucheon SK	K-League	10	0	?	?	7	0	-			
Total	South Korea		95	6			40	2				
Career total			95	6			40	2				

== International goals ==
Results list South Korea's goal tally first.

Date	Venue	Opponent	Score	Result	Competition
April 18, 1998	Skopje	Macedonia	1 goal	2-2	Friendly match
