= 1990 FIFA World Cup Group D =

Football tournament group stage

Play in Group D of the 1990 FIFA World Cup completed on 19 June 1990. West Germany won the group, and advanced to the second round, along with Yugoslavia and Colombia. The United Arab Emirates failed to advance.

== Standings ==
Pos	Team	Pld	W	D	L	GF	GA	GD	Pts	Qualification
1	West Germany	3	2	1	0	10	3	+7	5	Advance to knockout stage
2	Yugoslavia	3	2	0	1	6	5	+1	4	Advance to knockout stage
3	Colombia	3	1	1	1	3	2	+1	3	Advance to knockout stage
4	United Arab Emirates	3	0	0	3	2	11	−9	0	

Source: FIFA
Rules for classification: Group stage tiebreakers

== Matches ==
All times local (CEST/UTC+2)

=== United Arab Emirates vs Colombia ===
9 June 1990
17:00

United Arab Emirates	0–2	Colombia
		Redín 50'; Valderrama 85'

Stadio Renato Dall'Ara, Bologna
Attendance: 30,791
Referee: George Courtney (England)

United Arab Emirates	Colombia

GK	17	Muhsin Musabah
DF	20	Yousuf Hussain	(yellow card) 55'
DF	6	Abdulrahman Mohamed
DF	2	Khalil Ghanim
DF	15	Ibrahim Meer	(yellow card) 70'
MF	19	Eissa Meer	(yellow card) 5'	(substituted off) 74'
MF	12	Hussain Ghuloum
MF	14	Nasir Khamees
MF	3	Ali Thani
FW	7	Fahad Khamees (c)		(substituted off) 57'
FW	10	Adnan Al Talyani
Substitutions:
GK	1	Abdullah Musa
MF	5	Abdullah Sultan		(substituted on) 74'
MF	8	Khalid Ismaïl
FW	11	Zuhair Bakheet		(substituted on) 57'
DF	21	Abdulrahman Al-Haddad
Manager:
(Brazil) Carlos Alberto Parreira

GK	1	René Higuita
DF	4	Luis Fernando Herrera
DF	15	Luis Carlos Perea
DF	2	Andrés Escobar
DF	3	Gildardo Gómez
MF	8	Gabriel Gómez
MF	14	Leonel Álvarez
MF	11	Bernardo Redín
MF	10	Carlos Valderrama (c)
FW	19	Freddy Rincón
FW	16	Arnoldo Iguarán	(substituted off) 75'
Substitutions:
GK	12	Eduardo Niño
DF	6	José Ricardo Pérez
MF	7	Carlos Estrada	(substituted on) 75'
MF	20	Luis Fajardo
FW	22	Rubén Darío Hernández
Manager:
Francisco Maturana

Assistant referees:
Alan Snoddy (Northern Ireland)
Shizuo Takada (Japan)

=== West Germany vs Yugoslavia ===
10 June 1990
21:00

West Germany	4–1	Yugoslavia
Matthäus 28', 64'; Klinsmann 39'; Völler 70'		Jozić 55'

San Siro, Milan
Attendance: 74,765
Referee: Peter Mikkelsen (Denmark)

West Germany	Yugoslavia

GK	1	Bodo Illgner
SW	5	Klaus Augenthaler
DF	14	Thomas Berthold
DF	6	Guido Buchwald
MF	2	Stefan Reuter
MF	8	Thomas Häßler		(substituted off) 74'
MF	10	Lothar Matthäus (c)
MF	15	Uwe Bein		(substituted off) 74'
MF	3	Andreas Brehme	(yellow card) 5'
FW	9	Rudi Völler
FW	18	Jürgen Klinsmann
Substitutions:
GK	12	Raimond Aumann
MF	7	Pierre Littbarski		(substituted on) 74'
FW	13	Karl-Heinz Riedle
MF	17	Andreas Möller		(substituted on) 74'
DF	19	Hans Pflügler
Manager:
Franz Beckenbauer

GK	1	Tomislav Ivković
SW	6	Davor Jozić
DF	4	Zoran Vulić
DF	3	Predrag Spasić
DF	5	Faruk Hadžibegić
DF	18	Mirsad Baljić
MF	8	Safet Sušić	(substituted off) 55'
MF	10	Dragan Stojković
MF	13	Srečko Katanec
FW	19	Dejan Savićević	(substituted off) 55'
FW	11	Zlatko Vujović (c)
Substitutions:
GK	12	Fahrudin Omerović
MF	7	Dragoljub Brnović	(substituted on) 55'
FW	9	Darko Pančev
MF	15	Robert Prosinečki	(substituted on) 55'
MF	16	Refik Šabanadžović
Manager:
Ivica Osim

Assistant referees:
Jassim Mandi (Bahrain)
Michał Listkiewicz (Poland)

=== Yugoslavia vs Colombia ===
14 June 1990
17:00

Yugoslavia	1–0	Colombia
Jozić 75'

Stadio Renato Dall'Ara, Bologna
Attendance: 32,257
Referee: Luigi Agnolin (Italy)

Yugoslavia	Colombia

GK	1	Tomislav Ivković
SW	6	Davor Jozić
DF	3	Predrag Spasić
DF	5	Faruk Hadžibegić
MF	2	Vujadin Stanojković
MF	8	Safet Sušić
MF	16	Refik Šabanadžović
MF	13	Srečko Katanec		(substituted off) 46'
MF	7	Dragoljub Brnović
FW	10	Dragan Stojković	(yellow card) 86'
FW	11	Zlatko Vujović (c)		(substituted off) 53'
Substitutions:
GK	12	Fahrudin Omerović
DF	4	Zoran Vulić
FW	9	Darko Pančev		(substituted on) 53'
MF	17	Robert Jarni		(substituted on) 46'
FW	19	Dejan Savićević
Manager:
Ivica Osim

GK	1	René Higuita
DF	4	Luis Fernando Herrera
DF	15	Luis Carlos Perea
DF	2	Andrés Escobar
DF	3	Gildardo Gómez
MF	8	Gabriel Gómez
MF	14	Leonel Álvarez
MF	11	Bernardo Redín	(substituted off) 78'
MF	10	Carlos Valderrama (c)
FW	19	Freddy Rincón	(substituted off) 68'
FW	16	Arnoldo Iguarán
Substitutions:
GK	12	Eduardo Niño
DF	6	José Ricardo Pérez
MF	7	Carlos Estrada	(substituted on) 78'
MF	20	Luis Fajardo
FW	22	Rubén Darío Hernández	(substituted on) 68'
Manager:
Francisco Maturana

Assistant referees:
Neji Jouini (Tunisia)
Jean-Fidèle Diramba (Gabon)

=== West Germany vs United Arab Emirates ===
15 June 1990
21:00

West Germany	5–1	United Arab Emirates
Völler 35', 75'; Klinsmann 37'; Matthäus 47'; Bein 58'		Ismaïl 46'

San Siro, Milan
Attendance: 71,169
Referee: Alexey Spirin (Soviet Union)

West Germany	United Arab Emirates

GK	1	Bodo Illgner
SW	5	Klaus Augenthaler
DF	14	Thomas Berthold		(substituted off) 46'
DF	6	Guido Buchwald
MF	2	Stefan Reuter
MF	8	Thomas Häßler
MF	10	Lothar Matthäus (c)
MF	15	Uwe Bein
MF	3	Andreas Brehme	(yellow card) 31'
FW	9	Rudi Völler
FW	18	Jürgen Klinsmann		(substituted off) 71'
Substitutions:
GK	12	Raimond Aumann
MF	7	Pierre Littbarski		(substituted on) 46'
FW	13	Karl-Heinz Riedle		(substituted on) 71'
MF	17	Andreas Möller
DF	19	Hans Pflügler
Manager:
Franz Beckenbauer

GK	17	Muhsin Musabah
DF	20	Yousuf Hussain	(yellow card) 26'
DF	6	Abdulrahman Mohamed (c)
DF	2	Khalil Ghanim
DF	15	Ibrahim Meer		(substituted off) 87'
MF	19	Eissa Meer
MF	12	Hussain Ghuloum	(yellow card) 30'
MF	14	Nasir Khamees
MF	8	Khalid Ismaïl		(substituted off) 82'
FW	3	Ali Thani
FW	10	Adnan Al Talyani
Substitutions:
GK	1	Abdullah Musa
MF	5	Abdullah Sultan
FW	11	Zuhair Bakheet
MF	13	Hassan Mohamed		(substituted on) 82'
DF	21	Abdulrahman Al-Haddad		(substituted on) 87'
Manager:
(Brazil) Carlos Alberto Parreira

Assistant referees:
Shizuo Takada (Japan)
Pierluigi Pairetto (Italy)

=== West Germany vs Colombia ===
19 June 1990
17:00

West Germany	1–1	Colombia
Littbarski 88'		Rincón 90+3'

San Siro, Milan
Attendance: 72,510
Referee: Alan Snoddy (Northern Ireland)

West Germany	Colombia

GK	1	Bodo Illgner
SW	5	Klaus Augenthaler
DF	14	Thomas Berthold	(yellow card) 63'
DF	6	Guido Buchwald
MF	2	Stefan Reuter
MF	8	Thomas Häßler		(substituted off) 88'
MF	10	Lothar Matthäus (c)
MF	15	Uwe Bein		(substituted off) 46'
DF	19	Hans Pflügler
FW	9	Rudi Völler
FW	18	Jürgen Klinsmann
Substitutions:
GK	12	Raimond Aumann
MF	7	Pierre Littbarski		(substituted on) 46'
FW	13	Karl-Heinz Riedle
DF	16	Paul Steiner
MF	20	Olaf Thon		(substituted on) 88'
Manager:
Franz Beckenbauer

GK	1	René Higuita
DF	4	Luis Fernando Herrera	(yellow card) 15'
DF	15	Luis Carlos Perea
DF	2	Andrés Escobar
DF	3	Gildardo Gómez
MF	8	Gabriel Gómez	(yellow card) 30'
MF	14	Leonel Álvarez	(yellow card) 38'
MF	20	Luis Fajardo
MF	10	Carlos Valderrama (c)
MF	7	Carlos Estrada
FW	19	Freddy Rincón
Substitutions:
GK	12	Eduardo Niño
DF	6	José Ricardo Pérez
FW	16	Arnoldo Iguarán
DF	17	Geovanis Cassiani
FW	22	Rubén Darío Hernández
Manager:
Francisco Maturana

Assistant referees:
Jassim Mandi (Bahrain)
Tullio Lanese (Italy)

=== Yugoslavia vs United Arab Emirates ===
19 June 1990
17:00

Yugoslavia	4–1	United Arab Emirates
Sušić 5'; Pančev 9', 46'; Prosinečki 90+3'		Thani 22'

Stadio Renato Dall'Ara, Bologna
Attendance: 27,833
Referee: Shizuo Takada (Japan)

Yugoslavia	United Arab Emirates

GK	1	Tomislav Ivković
SW	5	Faruk Hadžibegić
DF	2	Vujadin Stanojković
DF	3	Predrag Spasić
MF	16	Refik Šabanadžović	(yellow card) 71'	(substituted off) 78'
MF	10	Dragan Stojković
MF	6	Davor Jozić
MF	8	Safet Sušić
MF	7	Dragoljub Brnović	(yellow card) 20'
FW	9	Darko Pančev	(yellow card) 76'
FW	11	Zlatko Vujović (c)		(substituted off) 64'
Substitutions:
GK	12	Fahrudin Omerović
DF	4	Zoran Vulić		(substituted on) 64'
MF	15	Robert Prosinečki		(substituted on) 78'
MF	17	Robert Jarni
FW	19	Dejan Savićević
Manager:
Ivica Osim

GK	17	Muhsin Musabah
DF	19	Eissa Meer
DF	6	Abdulrahman Mohamed (c)
DF	2	Khalil Ghanim (yellow card) 36' (yellow-red card) 76'
DF	15	Ibrahim Meer
MF	21	Abdulrahman Al-Haddad
MF	12	Hussain Ghuloum
MF	14	Nasir Khamees	(substituted off) 35'
MF	8	Khalid Ismaïl
FW	3	Ali Thani	(substituted off) 46'
FW	10	Adnan Al Talyani
Substitutions:
GK	1	Abdullah Musa
MF	5	Abdullah Sultan	(substituted on) 35'
FW	7	Fahad Khamees	(substituted on) 46'
FW	11	Zuhair Bakheet
DF	16	Mohamed Salim
Manager:
(Brazil) Carlos Alberto Parreira

Assistant referees:
Peter Mikkelsen (Denmark)
Michel Vautrot (France)

== See also ==
- Colombia at the FIFA World Cup
- Germany at the FIFA World Cup
- United Arab Emirates at the FIFA World Cup
- Yugoslavia at the FIFA World Cup
