= United Arab Emirates at the FIFA World Cup =

International football delegation

The FIFA World Cup, sometimes called the Football World Cup or the Soccer World Cup, but usually referred to simply as the World Cup, is an international association football competition contested by the men's national teams of the members of Fédération Internationale de Football Association (FIFA), the sport's global governing body. The championship has been awarded every four years since the first tournament in 1930, except in 1942 and 1946, due to World War II.

The tournament consists of two parts, the qualification phase and the final phase (officially called the World Cup Finals). The qualification phase, which currently take place over the three years preceding the Finals, is used to determine which teams qualify for the Finals. The UAE have appeared in the finals of the FIFA World Cup on one occasion in 1990 where they lost all three games.

As of 18 November 2025, UAE has once again failed to qualify for the final tournament as the team drew 1–1 on its first leg and losing 2–1 on the final leg against Iraq.

== The impact of qualifying for the World Cup ==
Numerous nations view their involvement in the World Cup as a strategic move to increase their likelihood of hosting the event in the future. Countries that compete in the tournament have a 17% greater chance of securing the bid for hosting the World Cup. Hosting this prestigious event yields substantial economic advantages and promotes tourism. With its sights set on the National Sports Strategy 2031 objective of enhancing its involvement in multiple international competitions, the United Arab Emirates is eager to capitalize on this occasion.

== UAE national team in the World Cup qualifiers ==
=== 1986 World Cup qualifiers ===
In 1986, the UAE national football team embarked on its first-ever journey in the World Cup qualifiers. The team competed against several other nations in their qualifying group, including Saudi Arabia and Iraq. Despite their best efforts, the UAE team could not secure enough wins to progress to the next stage of the qualifiers. Nevertheless, this experience marked an important milestone in the country's football history, paving the way for future generations of players to represent the UAE on the international stage.

=== 1990 World Cup qualifiers ===
The UAE national team made history in the 1990 World Cup by earning a place in the finals for the first time. The UAE national team started in the preliminary qualifiers and advanced to the final qualifiers topping their group with 6 points in February 1989.

In the last leg of the World Cup qualifiers, the UAE national team competed in a group that included: North Korea, South Korea, China, Qatar, and Saudi Arabia. Despite winning just one match against the Chinese national team with a one-goal lead, the UAE national team again managed to secure 6 points, securing a commendable second position. The top spot was taken by the South Korean national team, with 8 points.

== The difficulties faced by the UAE national team ==
The qualification earned by the UAE national team is a historical accomplishment, not only for being their first, but also for the adversities they had to overcome during the qualifying period. A player for the UAE national team, was suspended before the last match in the qualifiers against South Korea. Along with this setback, the team persevered through adversity as several injured players required medical injections to withstand their injuries and play the match.

Despite the remarkable achievement of the UAE national team, the UAE Football Association has decided to part ways with coach Mario Zagallo. Mr. Zagallo led the team during the qualifiers, yet he was relieved of his duties only a few days after the team's successful qualification. Coach Carlos Alberto was selected to lead the UAE national football team in the 1990 World Cup finals.

== Overall record ==
FIFA World Cup record									Qualification record					
Year	Round	Position	Pld	W	D	L	GF	GA	GP	W	D	L	GF	GA
(Uruguay) 1930	Not eligible to enter								Not eligible to enter					
(Italy) 1934	Not eligible to enter								Not eligible to enter					
(France) 1938	Not eligible to enter								Not eligible to enter					
(Brazil) 1950	Not eligible to enter								Not eligible to enter					
(Switzerland) 1954	Not eligible to enter								Not eligible to enter					
(Sweden) 1958	Not eligible to enter								Not eligible to enter					
(Chile) 1962	Not eligible to enter								Not eligible to enter					
(England) 1966	Not eligible to enter								Not eligible to enter					
(Mexico) 1970	Not eligible to enter								Not eligible to enter					
(West Germany) 1974	Not eligible to enter								Not eligible to enter					
(Argentina) 1978	Did not enter								Did not enter					
(Spain) 1982	Did not enter								Did not enter					
(Mexico) 1986	Did not qualify								4	2	1	1	5	4
(Italy) 1990	Group stage	24th	3	0	0	3	2	11	9	4	4	1	16	7
(United States) 1994	Did not qualify								8	6	1	1	19	4
(France) 1998	Did not qualify								12	5	4	3	16	13
(South Korea) (Japan) 2002	Did not qualify								14	7	2	5	31	20
(Germany) 2006	Did not qualify								6	3	1	2	6	6
(South Africa) 2010	Did not qualify								16	4	3	9	19	24
(Brazil) 2014	Did not qualify								8	2	1	5	14	16
(Russia) 2018	Did not qualify								18	9	3	6	37	17
(Qatar) 2022	Did not qualify								19	9	3	7	31	16
(Canada) (Mexico) (United States) 2026	Did not qualify								20	10	5	5	36	16
(Morocco) (Portugal) (Spain) 2030	To be determined (TBD)								To be determined					
(Saudi Arabia) 2034	To be determined (TBD)								To be determined					
Total	Group stage	1/22	3	0	0	3	2	11	135	61	28	47	230	143

* Denotes draws include knockout matches decided via penalty shoot-out.

United Arab Emirates's World Cup record
First match	United Arab Emirates 0–2 Colombia (9 June 1990; Bologna, Italy)
Biggest Win	—
Biggest Defeat	West Germany 5–1 United Arab Emirates (15 June 1990; Milan, Italy)
Best Result	Group stage in 1990
Worst Result	Group stage in 1990

=== By Match ===
Year	Round	Opponents	Score	Scorers
(Italy) 1990	Group D	Colombia	0–2	
(Italy) 1990	Group D	West Germany	1–5	Khalid Ismail
(Italy) 1990	Group D	Yugoslavia	1–4	Ali Thani Jumaa

=== Head-to-head record ===
Opponent	Pld	W	D	L	GF	GA	GD	Win %
Colombia	1	0	0	1	0	2	−2	0.00
West Germany	1	0	0	1	1	5	−4	0.00
Yugoslavia	1	0	0	1	1	4	−3	0.00
Total	3	0	0	3	2	11	−9	0.00

== 1990 FIFA World Cup ==
Pos	Team	Pld	W	D	L	GF	GA	GD	Pts	Qualification
1	West Germany	3	2	1	0	10	3	+7	5	Advance to knockout stage
2	Yugoslavia	3	2	0	1	6	5	+1	4	Advance to knockout stage
3	Colombia	3	1	1	1	3	2	+1	3	Advance to knockout stage
4	United Arab Emirates	3	0	0	3	2	11	−9	0	

Source: FIFA
Rules for classification: Group stage tiebreakers

=== UAE vs Colombia ===
9 June 1990
17:00

United Arab Emirates	0-2	Colombia
	Report	Redín 50'; Valderrama 85'

Stadio Renato Dall'Ara, Bologna
Attendance: 30,791
Referee: George Courtney (England)

UAE	Colombia

UNITED ARAB EMIRATES:
GK	17	Muhsin Musabah
DF	20	Yousuf Hussain	(yellow card) 55'
DF	6	Abdulrahman Mohamed
DF	2	Khalil Ghanim
DF	15	Ibrahim Meer	(yellow card) 10'
MF	19	Eissa Meer	(yellow card) 5'	(substituted off) 74'
MF	12	Hussain Ghuloum
MF	14	Nasir Khamees
MF	3	Ali Thani
FW	7	Fahad Khamees (c)		(substituted off) 57'
FW	10	Adnan Al Talyani
Substitutions:
MF	5	Abdullah Sultan		(substituted on) 74'
FW	11	Zuhair Bakhit		(substituted on) 57'
Manager:
(Brazil) Carlos Alberto Parreira

COLOMBIA:
GK	1	René Higuita
DF	4	Luis Fernando Herrera
DF	15	Luis Carlos Perea
DF	2	Andrés Escobar
DF	3	Gildardo Gómez
MF	8	Gabriel Gómez
MF	14	Leonel Álvarez
MF	11	Bernardo Redín
MF	10	Carlos Valderrama (c)
FW	19	Freddy Rincón
FW	16	Arnoldo Iguarán	(substituted off) 75'
Substitutions:
MF	7	Carlos Estrada	(substituted on) 75'
Manager:
(Colombia) Francisco Maturana

Assistant referees:
Alan Snoddy (Northern Ireland)
Shizuo Takada (Japan)

=== West Germany vs UAE ===
Ismaïl Mubarak got the only goal for the UAE in the first minute of the second half when he latched onto a ball in the box after a mistake by a German defender and hit a low left footed shot into the net.

15 June 1990
21:00

West Germany	5–1	United Arab Emirates
Völler 35', 75'; Klinsmann 37'; Matthäus 47'; Bein 58'	Report	Ismaïl Mubarak 46'

San Siro, Milan
Attendance: 71,169
Referee: Alexey Spirin (Soviet Union)

West Germany	UAE

WEST GERMANY:
GK	1	Bodo Illgner
SW	5	Klaus Augenthaler
DF	14	Thomas Berthold		(substituted off) 46'
DF	6	Guido Buchwald
MF	2	Stefan Reuter
MF	8	Thomas Häßler
MF	10	Lothar Matthäus (c)
MF	15	Uwe Bein
MF	3	Andreas Brehme	(yellow card) 86'
FW	9	Rudi Völler
FW	18	Jürgen Klinsmann		(substituted off) 71'
Substitutions:
MF	7	Pierre Littbarski		(substituted on) 46'
FW	13	Karl-Heinz Riedle		(substituted on) 71'
Manager:
(West Germany) Franz Beckenbauer

UNITED ARAB EMIRATES:
GK	17	Muhsin Musabah
DF	20	Yousuf Hussain	(yellow card) 26'
DF	6	Abdulrahman Mohamed (c)
DF	2	Khalil Ghanim
DF	15	Ibrahim Meer		(substituted off) 87'
MF	19	Eissa Meer
MF	12	Hussain Ghuloum	(yellow card) 30'
MF	14	Nasir Khamees
MF	8	Khalid Ismaïl
FW	3	Ali Thani
FW	10	Adnan Al Talyani
Substitutions:
DF	21	Abdulrahman Al-Haddad		(substituted on) 87'
Manager:
(Brazil) Carlos Alberto Parreira

Assistant referees:
Shizuo Takada (Japan)
Pierluigi Pairetto (Italy)

=== Yugoslavia vs UAE ===
Thani Jumaa got the only goal for the UAE in the 22nd minute when he headed home from six yards after a cross from the left.

19 June 1990
17:00

Yugoslavia	4–1	United Arab Emirates
Sušić 4'; Pančev 8', 46'; Prosinečki 90'	Report	Thani Jumaa 22'

Stadio Renato Dall'Ara, Bologna
Attendance: 27,833
Referee: Shizuo Takada (Japan)

Yugoslavia	UAE

YUGOSLAVIA:
GK	1	Tomislav Ivković
SW	5	Faruk Hadžibegić
DF	2	Vujadin Stanojković
DF	3	Predrag Spasić
MF	16	Refik Šabanadžović	(yellow card) 71'	(substituted off) 78'
MF	10	Dragan Stojković
MF	6	Davor Jozić
MF	8	Safet Sušić
MF	7	Dragoljub Brnović	(yellow card) 20'
FW	9	Darko Pančev	(yellow card) 76'
FW	11	Zlatko Vujović (c)		(substituted off) 64'
Substitutions:
DF	4	Zoran Vulić		(substituted on) 64'
MF	15	Robert Prosinečki		(substituted on) 78'
Manager:
(Socialist Federal Republic of Yugoslavia) Ivica Osim

UNITED ARAB EMIRATES:
GK	17	Muhsin Musabah
DF	19	Eissa Meer
DF	6	Abdulrahman Mohamed (c)
DF	2	Khalil Ghanim (yellow card) 36' (yellow-red card) 76'
DF	15	Ibrahim Meer
MF	21	Abdulrahman Al-Haddad
MF	12	Hussain Ghuloum
MF	14	Nasir Khamees	(substituted off) 35'
MF	8	Khalid Ismaïl
FW	3	Ali Thani	(substituted off) 46'
FW	10	Adnan Al Talyani
Substitutions:
MF	5	Abdullah Sultan	(substituted on) 35'
FW	7	Fahad Khamees	(substituted on) 46'
Manager:
(Brazil) Carlos Alberto Parreira

Assistant referees:
Peter Mikkelsen (Denmark)
Michel Vautrot (France)

== Record players ==
Nine players have been fielded on all three occasions, making them record World Cup players for their country. Among them are twin brothers Eissa and Ibrahim Meer.

Rank	Player	Matches
1	Adnan Al Talyani	3
1	Mubarak Ghanim	3
1	Hussain Ghuloum	3
1	Nasir Khamees	3
1	Eissa Meer	3
1	Ibrahim Meer	3
1	Abdulrahman Mohamed	3
1	Muhsin Musabah	3
1	Ali Thani Jumaa	3

== Top goalscorers ==
Two UAE players scored one goal each at the 1990 World Cup.

Rank	Player	Goals
1	Khalid Ismaïl	1
1	Ali Thani Jumaa	1

== See also ==
- Asian nations at the FIFA World Cup
- United Arab Emirates at the AFC Asian Cup
