= United Arab Emirates at the AFC Asian Cup =

The United Arab Emirates is one of the more successful teams in the Asian Cup qualifying for ten editions from 1980 to 2019. They have qualified for the semi-finals on four occasions, as well as the final in 1996, however they have never won an Asian Cup.

== Overall record ==
AFC Asian Cup record									Qualification record					
Year	Result	Position	Pld	W	D	L	GF	GA	Pld	W	D	L	GF	GA
(Hong Kong) 1956 to (Thailand) 1972	Part of the United Kingdom								Part of the United Kingdom					
(Iran) 1976	Did not enter								Did not enter					
(Kuwait) 1980	Group stage	9th	4	0	1	3	3	9	3	1	2	0	2	0
(Singapore) 1984	Group stage	6th	4	2	0	2	3	8	4	3	0	1	24	2
(Qatar) 1988	Group stage	8th	4	1	0	3	2	4	5	4	1	0	12	1
(Japan) 1992	Fourth place	4th	5	1	3	1	3	4	2	2	0	0	6	3
(United Arab Emirates) 1996	Runners-up	2nd	6	4	2	0	8	3	Qualified as hosts					
(Lebanon) 2000	Did not qualify								4	3	0	1	12	2
(China) 2004	Group stage	15th	3	0	1	2	1	5	6	4	1	1	13	5
(Indonesia) (Malaysia) (Thailand) (Vietnam) 2007	Group stage	12th	3	1	0	2	3	6	6	4	1	1	11	6
(Qatar) 2011	Group stage	13th	3	0	1	2	0	4	4	3	0	1	7	1
(Australia) 2015	Third place	3rd	6	3	1	2	10	8	6	5	1	0	18	3
(United Arab Emirates) 2019	Semi-finals	4th	6	3	2	1	8	8	Qualified as hosts					
(Qatar) 2023	Round of 16	12th	4	1	2	1	6	5	8	6	0	2	23	7
(Saudi Arabia) 2027	Qualified								6	5	1	0	16	2
Total	Runners-up	12/13	48	16	13	19	47	64	54	40	7	7	144	32

United Arab Emirates's Asian Cup record
First match	United Arab Emirates 1–1 Kuwait (15 September 1980; Kuwait City, Kuwait)
Biggest Win	United Arab Emirates 4–1 Qatar (11 January 2015; Canberra, Australia)
Biggest Defeat	China 5–0 United Arab Emirates (11 December 1984; Kallang, Singapore)
Best Result	Runners-up in 1996
Worst Result	Group stage in 1980, 1984, 1988, 2004, 2007, 2011

=== Head-to-head record ===
Opponent	Pld	W	D	L	GF	GA	GD	Win %
Australia	2	1	0	1	1	2	−1	50.00
Bahrain	2	1	1	0	3	2	+1	50.00
China	2	0	1	1	1	6	−5	0.00
Hong Kong	1	1	0	0	3	1	+2	100.00
India	2	2	0	0	4	0	+4	100.00
Indonesia	1	1	0	0	2	0	+2	100.00
Iran	6	0	1	5	1	10	−9	0.00
Iraq	3	2	0	1	4	3	+1	66.67
Japan	4	1	2	1	3	4	−1	25.00
Jordan	1	0	1	0	0	0	+0	0.00
Kuwait	4	2	1	1	6	6	+0	50.00
Kyrgyzstan	1	1	0	0	3	2	+1	100.00
Malaysia	1	0	0	1	0	2	−2	0.00
North Korea	2	1	1	0	2	1	+1	50.00
Palestine	1	0	1	0	1	1	+0	0.00
Qatar	5	2	0	3	8	10	−2	40.00
Saudi Arabia	2	0	1	1	0	2	−2	0.00
Singapore	1	1	0	0	1	0	+1	100.00
South Korea	4	0	1	3	2	8	−6	0.00
Tajikistan	1	0	1	0	1	1	+0	0.00
Thailand	1	0	1	0	1	1	+0	0.00
Vietnam	1	0	0	1	0	2	−2	0.00
Total	48	16	13	19	47	64	−17	33.33

== 1980 AFC Asian Cup ==
The UAE would make their first appearance in the 1980 AFC Asian Cup. This was seen as a historic achievement as it would serve the first stepping stone for UAE's golden era. They would draw to the eventual champions Kuwait, but lose their remaining games and finish bottom of the group.

=== Group stage ===
Pos	Team	Pld	W	D	L	GF	GA	GD	Pts	Qualification
1	South Korea	4	3	1	0	10	2	+8	10	Advance to knockout stage
2	Kuwait (H)	4	2	1	1	8	5	+3	7	Advance to knockout stage
3	Malaysia	4	1	2	1	5	5	0	5	
4	Qatar	4	1	1	2	3	8	−5	4	
5	United Arab Emirates	4	0	1	3	3	9	−6	1	

Source: RSSSF
(H) Hosts
15 September 1980

United Arab Emirates	1–1	Kuwait
Chombi 35'		Al-Houti 19'

Sabah Al-Salem Stadium, Kuwait City
Attendance: 20,000

17 September 1980

Qatar	2–1	United Arab Emirates
Muftah 50', 60'		Al-Hajri 58'

Sabah Al-Salem Stadium, Kuwait City

20 September 1980

Malaysia	2–0	United Arab Emirates
Abdah 32'; Tukamin 89'

Sabah Al-Salem Stadium, Kuwait City

24 September 1980
18:30

South Korea	4–1	United Arab Emirates
Choi Soon-ho 26', 53', 78' (pen.); Chung Hae-won 84'		Chombi 79'

Sabah Al-Salem Stadium, Kuwait City
Referee: Melvyn Victor D’Souza (India)

== 1984 AFC Asian Cup ==
In the 1984 edition, the UAE would see an improvement as they collected their first two victories against India and Singapore but took two devastating defeats against Iran and China which resulted in another group stage exit.

=== Group stage ===
Pos	Team	Pld	W	D	L	GF	GA	GD	Pts	Qualification
1	China	4	3	0	1	10	2	+8	6	Advance to knockout stage
2	Iran	4	2	2	0	6	1	+5	6	Advance to knockout stage
3	United Arab Emirates	4	2	0	2	3	8	−5	4	
4	Singapore (H)	4	1	1	2	3	4	−1	3	
5	India	4	0	1	3	0	7	−7	1	

Source: RSSSF
(H) Hosts
1 December 1984
21:00

Iran	3–0	United Arab Emirates
Alidousti 27'; Shahrokh Bayani 85' (pen.); Mohammadkhani 87'

National Stadium, Singapore
Attendance: 8,000
Referee: Toshikazu Sano (Japan)

4 December 1984
19:00

United Arab Emirates	2–0	India
Al-Talyani 81'; Khamees 88'

National Stadium, Singapore
Attendance: 2,000
Referee: Abu Wahid Shanbe (Oman)

8 December 1984
21:00

Singapore	0–1	United Arab Emirates
		Abdulrahman 62'

National Stadium, Singapore
Attendance: 15,000
Referee: Jassim Mandi (Bahrain)

11 December 1984
19:00

China	5–0	United Arab Emirates
Yang Zhaohui 12'; Jia Xiuquan 20'; Zuo Shusheng 36'; Zhao Dayu 52'; Gu Guangming 67'

National Stadium, Singapore
Attendance: 5,000
Referee: Shizuo Takada (Japan)

== 1988 AFC Asian Cup ==
During the 1988 AFC Asian Cup, the UAE would again lose in the group stages, only winning once against Japan. Despite this devastating campaign, the UAE would qualify for the 1990 FIFA World Cup a year later.

=== Group stage ===
Pos	Team	Pld	W	D	L	GF	GA	GD	Pts	Qualification
1	South Korea	4	4	0	0	9	2	+7	8	Advance to knockout stage
2	Iran	4	2	1	1	3	3	0	5	Advance to knockout stage
3	Qatar (H)	4	2	0	2	7	6	+1	4	
4	United Arab Emirates	4	1	0	3	2	4	−2	2	
5	Japan	4	0	1	3	0	6	−6	1	

Source: RSSSF
(H) Hosts
3 December 1988
15:00

United Arab Emirates	0–1	South Korea
	Report	Lee Tae-ho 8' (pen.)

Al-Ahly Stadium, Doha
Referee: George Courtney (England)

5 December 1988
17:00

Qatar	2–1	United Arab Emirates
Muftah 17'; Musabah 26' (o.g.)	Report	H. Mohamed 35'

Qatar SC Stadium, Doha
Referee: Erik Fredriksson (Sweden)

8 December 1988
15:00

Iran	1–0	United Arab Emirates
Pious 27'	Report

Qatar SC Stadium, Doha
Attendance: 4,000
Referee: Steven Ovinis (Malaysia)

10 December 1988
15:00

United Arab Emirates	1–0	Japan
A.A. Mohamed 86'	Report

Al-Ahly Stadium, Doha
Referee: Ahmad Bash (Jordan)

== 1992 AFC Asian Cup ==
In the 1992 AFC Asian Cup, the United Arab Emirates would qualify for the semi-finals for the first time after winning against North Korea and drawing against Japan and Iran. They would find themselves losing to neighbouring rivals Saudi Arabia and finish fourth after losing a penalty shoot out against China.

=== Group stage ===
Pos	Team	Pld	W	D	L	GF	GA	GD	Pts	Qualification
1	Japan (H)	3	1	2	0	2	1	+1	4	Advance to knockout stage
2	United Arab Emirates	3	1	2	0	2	1	+1	4	Advance to knockout stage
3	Iran	3	1	1	1	2	1	+1	3	
4	North Korea	3	0	1	2	2	5	−3	1	

Source: WorldFootball.net
(H) Hosts
30 October 1992
19:00

Japan	0–0	United Arab Emirates
	Report

Bingo Sports Park, Onomichi
Attendance: 10,000
Referee: Wei Jihong (China)

1 November 1992
12:00

Iran	0–0	United Arab Emirates
	Report

Hiroshima Big Arch, Hiroshima
Attendance: 25,000
Referee: Jamal Al Sharif (Syria)

3 November 1992
12:00

United Arab Emirates	2–1	North Korea
K. Mubarak 81'; Bakhit 85'	Report	Kim Kwang-min 69'

Hiroshima Big Arch, Hiroshima
Attendance: 33,000
Referee: Neji Jouini (Tunisia)

=== Semi-final ===
6 November 1992
19:00

Saudi Arabia	2–0	United Arab Emirates
Al-Owairan 77'; Al-Bishi 80'	Report

Hiroshima Stadium, Hiroshima
Attendance: 12,000
Referee: Rasheed Al-Jassas (Kuwait)

=== Third place play-off ===
8 November 1992
12:00

China	1–1	United Arab Emirates
Hao Haidong 15'	Report	Ismail 10'
Penalties
Fan Zhiyi (penalty missed); Cai Sheng (penalty scored); Wu Qunli (penalty scored); Peng Weiguo (penalty scored); Fu Yubin (penalty scored)	4–3	(penalty missed) Al-Talyani (penalty scored) (penalty scored) (penalty scored); (penalty missed) Ismaïl

Hiroshima Big Arch, Hiroshima
Attendance: 40,000
Referee: Neji Jouini (Tunisia)

== 1996 AFC Asian Cup ==
The 1996 Asian Cup would mark as the first time the UAE won the hosting rights and qualified automatically. The UAE would play its opening game to South Korea where they drew 1–1. They would later beat Kuwait and Indonesia and finish at the top of their group with seven points. They would face Iraq in the quarter-finals which ended with the Emirates winning 1–0 during golden goal time which meant the UAE would qualify for the semi-finals for the second consecutive time. They would once again beat Kuwait and qualify for their first final against the Saudis. Unfortunately for the UAE, they would once again find themselves losing to Saudi Arabia after a penalty shootout that resulted in 2–4.

=== Group stage ===
Pos	Team	Pld	W	D	L	GF	GA	GD	Pts	Qualification
1	United Arab Emirates (H)	3	2	1	0	6	3	+3	7	Advance to knockout stage
2	Kuwait	3	1	1	1	6	5	+1	4	Advance to knockout stage
3	South Korea	3	1	1	1	5	5	0	4	Advance to knockout stage
4	Indonesia	3	0	1	2	4	8	−4	1	

Source: RSSSF
(H) Hosts

4 December 1996
16:45

United Arab Emirates	1–1	South Korea
K. Saad 40'	Report	Hwang Sun-Hong 9'

Sheikh Zayed Stadium, Abu Dhabi
Attendance: 35,000
Referee: Pirom Un-Prasert (Thailand)

7 December 1996
16:45

United Arab Emirates	3–2	Kuwait
Saeed 53'; Al-Talyani 55'; B. Saad 80'	Report	Al-Huwaidi 9', 44'

Sheikh Zayed Stadium, Abu Dhabi
Attendance: 15,000
Referee: Charles Massembe (Uganda)

10 December 1996
16:45

United Arab Emirates	2–0	Indonesia
Saeed 15'; Al-Talyani 64'	Report

Sheikh Zayed Stadium, Abu Dhabi
Attendance: 10,000
Referee: Lu Jun (China)

=== Quarter-final ===
15 December 1996
16:45

United Arab Emirates	1–0 (a.e.t.)	Iraq
Ab. Ibrahim 103'	Report

Sheikh Zayed Stadium, Abu Dhabi
Attendance: 50,000
Referee: Gamal Al-Ghandour (Egypt)

=== Semi-final ===
19 December 1996
16:45

United Arab Emirates	1–0	Kuwait
Saeed 69'	Report

Sheikh Zayed Stadium, Abu Dhabi
Attendance: 55,000
Referee: Masayoshi Okada (Japan)

=== Final ===
21 December 1996
19:30

United Arab Emirates	0–0 (a.e.t.)	Saudi Arabia
	Report
Penalties
M. Ali (penalty scored); Saleh (penalty missed); K. Saad (penalty scored); Saeed (penalty missed)	2–4	(penalty scored) Al-Thunayan; (penalty scored) Zubromawi; (penalty missed) Al-Harbi; (penalty scored) Al-Temawi; (penalty scored) Al-Muwallid

Sheikh Zayed Stadium, Abu Dhabi
Attendance: 60,000
Referee: Mohd Nazri Abdullah (Malaysia)

== 2004 AFC Asian Cup ==
Even though they were successful in their last run, the UAE would fail to qualify for the 2000 Asian Cup which meant they needed to compensate in this edition. However they would lose two games and draw once, finishing at the bottom of the group with 1 point for the first time since 1980.

=== Group stage ===
Pos	Team	Pld	W	D	L	GF	GA	GD	Pts	Qualification
1	South Korea	3	2	1	0	6	0	+6	7	Advance to knockout stage
2	Jordan	3	1	2	0	2	0	+2	5	Advance to knockout stage
3	Kuwait	3	1	0	2	3	7	−4	3	
4	United Arab Emirates	3	0	1	2	1	5	−4	1	

Source: RSSSF
19 July 2004
21:00

Kuwait	3–1	United Arab Emirates
B. Abdullah 24'; Al-Mutawa 39' (pen.); Saeed 45' (o.g.)	Report	Rashid 47'

Shandong Sports Center, Jinan
Attendance: 31,250
Referee: Naser Al-Hamdan (Saudi Arabia)

23 July 2004
21:00

United Arab Emirates	0–2	South Korea
	Report	Lee Dong-gook 41'; Ahn Jung-hwan 90+1'

Shandong Sports Center, Jinan
Attendance: 30,000
Referee: Ravshan Irmatov (Uzbekistan)

27 July 2004
19:00

Jordan	0–0	United Arab Emirates
	Report

Workers Stadium, Beijing
Attendance: 25,000
Referee: Talaat Najm (Lebanon)

== 2007 AFC Asian Cup ==
Entering this tournament would mark as their seventh appearance and the Emiratis were a contender to make it past the group stage. However the first game resulted in a 0–2 upsetting defeat to Vietnam in which the game would be titled as the Disaster of Hanoi. They would lose to Japan, thus confirming that the UAE would once again get another early group exit but they would leave with a victory against Qatar and finish third with three points.

=== Group stage ===
Pos	Team	Pld	W	D	L	GF	GA	GD	Pts	Qualification
1	Japan	3	2	1	0	8	3	+5	7	Advance to knockout stage
2	Vietnam (H)	3	1	1	1	4	5	−1	4	Advance to knockout stage
3	United Arab Emirates	3	1	0	2	3	6	−3	3	
4	Qatar	3	0	2	1	3	4	−1	2	

Source: AFC
Rules for classification: Tiebreakers
(H) Hosts
8 July 2007
19:30 UTC+7

Vietnam	2–0	United Arab Emirates
Huỳnh Quang Thanh 64'; Lê Công Vinh 73'	Report

Mỹ Đình Stadium, Hanoi
Attendance: 39,450
Referee: Talaat Najm (Lebanon)

13 July 2007
20:30 UTC+7

United Arab Emirates	1–3	Japan
Al-Kass 66'	Report	Takahara 22', 27'; S. Nakamura 42' (pen.)

Mỹ Đình Stadium, Hanoi
Attendance: 5,000
Referee: Satop Tongkhan (Thailand)

16 July 2007
17:15 UTC+7

Qatar	1–2	United Arab Emirates
Soria 42' (pen.)	Report	Al-Kass 60'; Khalil 90+4'

Army Stadium, Ho Chi Minh City
Attendance: 3,000
Referee: Masoud Moradi (Iran)

== 2011 AFC Asian Cup ==
In 2011, the UAE would lose to Iraq and Iran but draw to North Korea, this resulted in their worst campaign as they finished at the bottom of the group with zero goals scored.

=== Group stage ===
Pos	Team	Pld	W	D	L	GF	GA	GD	Pts	Qualification
1	Iran	3	3	0	0	6	1	+5	9	Advance to knockout stage
2	Iraq	3	2	0	1	3	2	+1	6	Advance to knockout stage
3	North Korea	3	0	1	2	0	2	−2	1	
4	United Arab Emirates	3	0	1	2	0	4	−4	1	

Source: AFC
Rules for classification: Tiebreakers
11 January 2011
16:15

North Korea	0–0	United Arab Emirates
	Report

Qatar SC Stadium, Doha
Attendance: 3,639
Referee: Subkhiddin Mohd Salleh (Malaysia)

15 January 2011
19:15

United Arab Emirates	0–1	Iraq
	Report	W. Abbas 90+3' (o.g.)

Ahmed bin Ali Stadium, Al Rayyan
Attendance: 7,233
Referee: Yuichi Nishimura (Japan)

19 January 2011
19:15

United Arab Emirates	0–3	Iran
	Report	Afshin 67'; M. Nouri 83'; W. Abbas 90+3' (o.g.)

Qatar SC Stadium, Doha
Attendance: 5,012
Referee: Kim Dong-Jin (South Korea)

== 2015 AFC Asian Cup ==
After three consecutive group stage exits, the UAE would finally get past the group stage after smashing Qatar 4–1 and beating Bahrain 2–1, they would finish second after losing to Iran 0–1 which meant facing the defending champions Japan in the quarter-finals. However, in a surprising turn of events, the UAE would beat Japan in a penalty shootout that ended 5–4. This was seen as one of the biggest upsets in the tournament's history as the Japanese have won the last three out of four Asian cups and are seen as a heavy favourites. Their campaign would end in the semi-finals after a 0–2 loss to the hosts Australia but ultimately finished third place after winning against Iraq 3–2.

=== Group stage ===
Pos	Team	Pld	W	D	L	GF	GA	GD	Pts	Qualification
1	Iran	3	3	0	0	4	0	+4	9	Advance to knockout stage
2	United Arab Emirates	3	2	0	1	6	3	+3	6	Advance to knockout stage
3	Bahrain	3	1	0	2	3	5	−2	3	
4	Qatar	3	0	0	3	2	7	−5	0	

Source: Asian Cup Australia 2015
Rules for classification: Tiebreakers
11 January 2015
18:00 AEDT (UTC+11)

United Arab Emirates	4–1	Qatar
Khalil 37', 52'; Mabkhout 56', 90'	Report	Ibrahim 23'

Canberra Stadium, Canberra
Attendance: 5,513
Referee: Kim Jong-hyeok (South Korea)

15 January 2015
18:00 AEDT (UTC+11)

Bahrain	1–2	United Arab Emirates
Okwunwanne 26'	Report	Mabkhout 1'; Husain 74' (o.g.)

Canberra Stadium, Canberra
Attendance: 7,925
Referee: Chris Beath (Australia)

19 January 2015
19:00 AEST (UTC+10)

Iran	1–0	United Arab Emirates
Ghoochannejhad 90+1'	Report

Brisbane Stadium, Brisbane
Attendance: 11,394
Referee: Ryuji Sato (Japan)

=== Quarter-final ===
23 January 2015
20:30 AEDT (UTC+11)

Japan	1–1 (a.e.t.)	United Arab Emirates
Shibasaki 81'	Report	Mabkhout 7'
Penalties
Honda (penalty missed); Hasebe (penalty scored); Shibasaki (penalty scored); Toyoda (penalty scored); Morishige (penalty scored); Kagawa (penalty missed)	4–5	(penalty scored) O. Abdulrahman; (penalty scored) Mabkhout; (penalty missed) Esmaeel; (penalty scored) Hassan; (penalty scored) Fardan; (penalty scored) I. Ahmed

Stadium Australia, Sydney
Attendance: 19,094
Referee: Alireza Faghani (Iran)

=== Semi-final ===
27 January 2015
20:00 AEDT (UTC+11)

Australia	2–0	United Arab Emirates
Sainsbury 3'; Davidson 14'	Report

Newcastle Stadium, Newcastle
Attendance: 21,079
Referee: Ravshan Irmatov (Uzbekistan)

=== Third place play-off ===
30 January 2015
20:00 AEDT (UTC+11)

Iraq	2–3	United Arab Emirates
Salim 28'; Kalaf 42'	Report	Khalil 16', 51'; Mabkhout 57' (pen.)

Newcastle Stadium, Newcastle
Attendance: 12,829
Referee: Nawaf Shukralla (Bahrain)

== 2019 AFC Asian Cup ==
The UAE would win the hosting rights for the second time in 2019. They would finish first in their group with an unorthodox campaign, drawing to Bahrain and Thailand but winning against India, they only obtained 5 points which is less than any other group champion in that tournament. The UAE would struggle to beat Kyrgyzstan, only winning due to a penalty awarded during extra time. They would beat Australia 1–0 which meant that this was the second consecutive time the defending champion was knocked out by the UAE, coincidentally both were eliminated in the quarter-finals. Unfortunately the UAE would lose the semi-finals for the second consecutive time in an embarrassing 0–4 loss to Qatar and things got dirty when fans started throwing water bottles and footwear to the Qatari players.

=== Group stage ===
Pos	Team	Pld	W	D	L	GF	GA	GD	Pts	Qualification
1	United Arab Emirates (H)	3	1	2	0	4	2	+2	5	Advance to knockout stage
2	Thailand	3	1	1	1	3	5	−2	4 (Note: Head-to-head points: Thailand 3, Bahrain 0.)	Advance to knockout stage
3	Bahrain	3	1	1	1	2	2	0	4	Advance to knockout stage
4	India	3	1	0	2	4	4	0	3	

Source: AFC
(H) Hosts
Notes:
5 January 2019
20:00

United Arab Emirates	1–1	Bahrain
Khalil 88' (pen.)	Report	Al Romaihi 78'

Zayed Sports City Stadium, Abu Dhabi
Attendance: 33,878
Referee: Adham Makhadmeh (Jordan)

10 January 2019
20:00

India	0–2	United Arab Emirates
	Report	Khalf. Mubarak 41'; Mabkhout 88'

Zayed Sports City Stadium, Abu Dhabi
Attendance: 43,206
Referee: César Ramos (Mexico)

14 January 2019
20:00

United Arab Emirates	1–1	Thailand
Mabkhout 7'	Report	Thitipan 41'

Hazza bin Zayed Stadium, Al Ain
Attendance: 17,809
Referee: Ryuji Sato (Japan)

=== Round of 16 ===
21 January 2019
21:00

United Arab Emirates	3–2 (a.e.t.)	Kyrgyzstan
Esmaeel 14'; Mabkhout 64'; Khalil 103' (pen.)	Report	Murzaev 26'; Rustamov 90+1'

Zayed Sports City Stadium, Abu Dhabi
Attendance: 17,784
Referee: Fu Ming (China PR)

=== Quarter-final ===
25 January 2019
20:00

United Arab Emirates	1–0	Australia
Mabkhout 68'	Report

Hazza bin Zayed Stadium, Al Ain
Attendance: 25,053
Referee: Ryuji Sato (Japan)

=== Semi-final ===
29 January 2019
18:00

Qatar	4–0	United Arab Emirates
Khoukhi 22'; Ali 37'; Al-Haydos 80'; Ismail 90+3'	Report

Mohammed bin Zayed Stadium, Abu Dhabi
Attendance: 38,646
Referee: César Ramos (Mexico)

== 2023 AFC Asian Cup ==
The UAE opened their first game with a victory against Hong Kong albeit with two penalties rewarded on the way, their following match ended with a draw against Palestine with an own goal costing them the match. Their final group match against Iran ended with a loss but the UAE still finished second in the group. The UAE would play their first knockout game against debutant Tajikistan which ended as a draw and went on extra time. Neither found an opportunity to score during the extra time so the game resulted on penalties which saw the UAE lose 3–5. This was considered one of the weakest campaigns despite making it to the knockouts as the UAE reached the semi-finals two consecutive times in the last two editions.

=== Group stage ===
Pos	Team	Pld	W	D	L	GF	GA	GD	Pts	Qualification
1	Iran	3	3	0	0	7	2	+5	9	Advance to knockout stage
2	United Arab Emirates	3	1	1	1	5	4	+1	4	Advance to knockout stage
3	Palestine	3	1	1	1	5	5	0	4	Advance to knockout stage
4	Hong Kong	3	0	0	3	1	7	−6	0	

Source: AFC
Rules for classification: Group stage tiebreakers
14 January 2024
17:30

United Arab Emirates	3–1	Hong Kong
Adil 34' (pen.); Sultan 52'; Al-Ghassani 90+5' (pen.)	Report	Chan Siu Kwan 49'

Khalifa International Stadium, Al Rayyan
Attendance: 15,586
Referee: Muhammad Taqi (Singapore)

18 January 2024
20:30

Palestine	1–1	United Arab Emirates
Nasser 50' (o.g.)	Report	Adil 23'

Al Janoub Stadium, Al Wakrah
Attendance: 41,986
Referee: Ahmad Al-Ali (Kuwait)

23 January 2024
18:00

Iran	2–1	United Arab Emirates
Taremi 26', 65'	Report	Al-Ghassani 90+3'

Education City Stadium, Al Rayyan
Attendance: 34,259
Referee: Ilgiz Tantashev (Uzbekistan)

=== Knockout stage ===
==== Round of 16 ====
28 January 2024
19:00

Tajikistan	1–1 (a.e.t.)	United Arab Emirates
Hanonov 30'	Report	Al Hammadi 90+5'
Penalties
Nazarov (penalty scored); Hanonov (penalty scored); Panjshanbe (penalty scored); Soirov (penalty scored); Shukurov (penalty scored)	5–3	(penalty scored) Idrees; (penalty missed) Caio; (penalty scored) Lima; (penalty scored) Saleh

Ahmad bin Ali Stadium, Al Rayyan
Attendance: 33,584
Referee: Yusuke Araki (Japan)

== Goalscorers ==
Player	Goals	1980	1984	1988	1992	1996	2004	2007	2015	2019	2023
Ali Mabkhout	9								5	4	
Ahmed Khalil	6								4	2	
Hassan Ahmed	3					3					
Adnan Al-Talyani	3		1			2					
Sultan Adil	2										2
Saeed Al Kass	2							2			
Yahya Al-Ghassani	2										2
Ahmed Chombi	2	2									
Khamees Mubarak	2				1	1					
Farooq Abdulrahman	1		1								
Ghanem Al Hajri	1	1									
Khalifa Al Hammadi	1										1
Zuhair Bakhit	1				1						
Khamis Esmaeel	1									1	
Abdulrahman Ibrahim	1					1					
Khaled Ismail	1				1						
Faisal Khalil	1							1			
Fahad Khamees	1		1								
Abdulaziz Mohamed	1			1							
Hassan Mohamed	1			1							
Bakheet Mubarak	1					1					
Khalfan Mubarak	1									1	
Mohamed Rashid	1						1				
Zayed Sultan	1										1
Total	46	3	3	2	3	8	1	3	9	8	6

== See also ==
- United Arab Emirates at the FIFA World Cup
