= Abdullah Musa =

Emirati footballer (born 1958)

Personal information
- Full name: Abdullah Musa Abdullah
- Date of birth: 2 March 1958 (age 68)
- Place of birth: Dubai, Trucial States
- Height: 1.88 m (6 ft 2 in)
- Position: Goalkeeper

Senior career*
Years	Team	Apps	(Gls)
- Al-Ahli (Dubai)

International career
1980–1992	United Arab Emirates	9	(0)
- * Club domestic league appearances and goals

Abdullah Musa Abdullah (Arabic: عَبْد الله مُوسَى عَبْد الله; born 2 March 1958) is a footballer from the UAE who played as a goalkeeper for Al-Ahli Club in Dubai, and the UAE national football team. He was in the squad of UAE team in the 1990 FIFA World Cup in Italy but never played in the tournament.
