= Eissa Meer =

Emirati footballer (born 1967)

Personal information
- Full name: Nour Eissa Meer Abdulrahman
- Date of birth: 16 July 1967 (age 59)
- Place of birth: Trucial States
- Position: Right-back

Senior career*
Years	Team	Apps	(Gls)
- Sharjah FC

International career
	United Arab Emirates	29	(0)
- * Club domestic league appearances and goals

Nour Eissa Meer Abdulrahman (born 16 July 1967) is an Emirati former footballer who played as a right-back for the UAE national team and Sharjah FC. He played in the 1990 FIFA World Cup along with his twin brother Ibrahim.
