= Carlos Estrada =

Colombian football forward (born 1961)

Personal information
- Full name: Carlos Enrique Estrada Mosquera
- Date of birth: 1 November 1961 (age 64)
- Place of birth: Tumaco, Colombia
- Height: 1.70 m (5 ft 7 in)
- Position: Forward

Senior career*
Years	Team	Apps	(Gls)
1982–1983	Deportes Tolima	0	(0)
1984–1987	Deportivo Cali	68	(11)
1987–1989	Millonarios	103	(49)
1990–1992	Deportivo Cali	41	(10)
1992–1993	Independiente Medellín	32	(7)
1994	Deportivo Cali	20	(1)
1995	Independiente Medellín	6	(1)
Total		270	(79)

International career
1989–1991	Colombia	12	(0)

Managerial career
- 2009: Alianza Petrolera
- * Club domestic league appearances and goals

Carlos Enrique "La Gambeta" (The Dribble) Estrada Mosquera (born 1 November 1961) is a Colombian football forward who played for Colombia in the 1990 FIFA World Cup. He also played for Millonarios Fútbol Club.
