= Hussain Ghuloum =

Emirati footballer (born 1969)

Personal information
- Full name: Hussain Ghuloum Abbas Ali
- Date of birth: September 24, 1969 (age 57)
- Place of birth: United Arab Emirates
- Position: Midfielder

Senior career*
Years	Team	Apps	(Gls)
- Sharjah Club

International career
	United Arab Emirates	63	(0)
- * Club domestic league appearances and goals

Hussain Ghuloum Abbas Ali (Arabic: حُسَيْن غُلُوم عَبَّاس عَلِيّ; born 24 September 1969) is a UAE football (soccer) player who played as a left winger for the UAE national football team and Sharjah Club in Sharjah. He played in the 1990 FIFA World Cup
