= Nasir Khamees =

Emirati footballer (born 1965)

Personal information
- Full name: Nasir Khamees Mubarak
- Date of birth: 2 August 1965 (age 61)
- Place of birth: United Arab Emirates
- Position: Midfielder

Senior career*
Years	Team	Apps	(Gls)
1989–2000	Al Wasl FC		

International career
1986-1997	United Arab Emirates	57	(8)
- * Club domestic league appearances and goals

Nasser Khamees Mubarak (Arabic: نَاصِر خَمِيس مُبَارَك; born 2 August 1965) is an Emirati former footballer who played as a midfielder for the United Arab Emirates national team and Al Wasl FC in Dubai.

Khamees played for the UAE at the 1990 FIFA World Cup finals in Italy.
