= Hassan Mohamed (footballer) =

Emirati footballer (born 1962)

Personal information
- Full name: Hassan Mohamed Hussain Al-Shaibani
- Date of birth: August 23, 1962 (age 64)
- Place of birth: United Arab Emirates
- Position: Midfielder

International career
Years	Team	Apps	(Gls)
	United Arab Emirates	18	(2)

Hassan Mohamed Hussain Al-Shaibani (Arabic: حَسَن مُحَمَّد حُسَيْن الشَّيْبَانِيّ) (born 23 August 1962), is a UAE football (soccer) player who played as a midfielder for the UAE national football team and Al Wasl F.C. in Dubai.

He was a member of the UAE national team that took part in the 1990 FIFA World Cup.
