= Abdulrahman Mohamed (Emirati footballer) =

Emirati footballer (born 1963)

Personal information
- Full name: Abdulrahman Mohamed Abdullah
- Date of birth: 1 October 1963 (age 63)
- Height: 1.73 m (5 ft 8 in)
- Position: Defender

International career
Years	Team	Apps	(Gls)
1989–90	United Arab Emirates	33	(4)

Abdulrahman Mohamed Abdullah (Arabic: عَبْد الرَّحْمٰن مُحَمَّد عَبْد الله) (born 1 October 1963) is a retired Emirati footballer. He played as a defender for the UAE national football team and Al-Nasr Club in Dubai.

Mohamed played in the 1990 FIFA World Cup and was the captain of the team in the match against West Germany.
