= Ibrahim Meer =

Emirati footballer (born 1967)

Personal information
- Full name: Nair Ibrahim Meer Abdulrahman
- Date of birth: 16 July 1967 (age 59)
- Place of birth: Trucial States
- Position: Defender

International career
Years	Team	Apps	(Gls)
1988-1996	United Arab Emirates	57	(0)

Nair Ibrahim Meer Abdulrahman (Arabic: إِبْرَاهِيم مِير عَبْد الرَّحْمٰن, born 16 July 1967) is a retired UAE football player who played as a left back for the UAE national football team and Sharjah FC. He played in the 1990 FIFA World Cup along with his twin brother Eissa.
