= Abdulrahman Al-Haddad =

Emirati footballer (born 1966)

Personal information
- Full name: Abdulrahman Al-Haddad
- Date of birth: 31 March 1966 (age 60)
- Place of birth: Trucial States

International career
| Years | Team | Apps | (Gls) |
| 1984-1997 | United Arab Emirates | 64 | (2) |

Abdulrahman Al-Haddad (Arabic: عَبْد الرَّحْمٰن الْحَدَّاد; born 31 March 1966) is a retired UAE footballer. He played as a centre back for the UAE national football team as well as the Sharjah FC in Sharjah.

Al-Haddad played for the UAE at the 1990 FIFA World Cup finals.
