= Eduardo Niño =

Colombian footballer (born 1967)

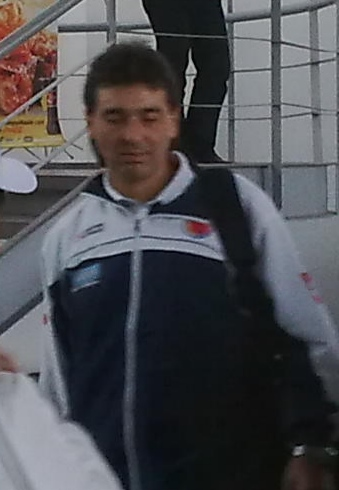

Personal information
- Full name: Eduardo Niño García
- Date of birth: August 8, 1967 (age 59)
- Place of birth: Bogotá, Colombia
- Height: 1.84 m (6 ft 1/2 in)
- Position: Goalkeeper

Senior career*
Years	Team	Apps	(Gls)
1985–1989	Santa Fe	88	(0)
1990–1998	América de Cali	190	(0)
1993	→ Botafogo (loan)	0	(0)
1999	Unión Magdalena	?	(?)
2000–2002	Millonarios	84	(0)

International career
1989–1993	Colombia	3	(0)
- * Club domestic league appearances and goals

Eduardo Niño García (born 8 August 1967) is a retired Colombian football goalkeeper. He was born in Bogota, and started his career playing for Independiente Santa Fe, and was then transferred to América de Cali. He later became goalkeeping coach at Millonarios. He is currently the goalkeeping coach for the Colombia national football team as well as for Primera Division Liga Aguila Side: Deportivo Cali
