= Yousuf Hussain =

Emirati footballer (born 1965)

Personal information
- Full name: Yousuf Hussain Mohamed Al-Sahlawi
- Date of birth: July 8, 1965 (age 61)
- Place of birth: Trucial States
- Position: Defender

International career
Years	Team	Apps	(Gls)
	United Arab Emirates	27	(2)

Yousuf Hussain Mohamed Al-Sahlawi (Arabic: يُوسُف حُسَيْن مُحَمَّد السَّهْلَاوِيّ) (born 8 July 1965), is a UAE football (soccer) player who played as a center back for the UAE national football team and Sharjah Club in Sharjah. He played in the 1990 FIFA World Cup, and now heading the technical committee in UAE football association in Sharjah.
