= Abdullah Ali Sultan =

Emirati footballer (born 1963)

Abdullah Sultan
Personal information
- Full name: Abdullah Ali Sultan Ahmed
- Date of birth: 1 October 1963 (age 63)
- Height: 1.76 m (5 ft 9 1/2 in)
- Position: Midfielder

Senior career*
Years	Team	Apps	(Gls)
- Al Khaleej Club

International career
1985–1990	United Arab Emirates	35	(2)
- * Club domestic league appearances and goals

Abdullah Ali Sultan Ahmed (Arabic: عَبْد الله عَلِيّ سُلْطَان أَحْمَد; born 1 October 1963) is a UAE football (soccer) player who played as a midfielder for the UAE national football team and Al Khaleej Club in Sharjah.
