= Muhsin Musabah =

Emirati footballer (born 1964)

Personal information
- Full name: Muhsin Musabah Faraj Fairouz
- Date of birth: 1 October 1964 (age 62)
- Place of birth: Sharjah, Trucial States
- Height: 1.86 m (6 ft 1 in)
- Position: Goalkeeper

Senior career*
Years	Team	Apps	(Gls)
1984–2002	Al-Sharjah	678	(0)

International career
1988–1999	United Arab Emirates	107	(0)
- * Club domestic league appearances and goals

Muhsin Musabah Faraj Fairouz (Arabic: مُحْسِن مِصْبَاح فَرَج فَيْرُوز) (born October 1, 1964) is a retired United Arab Emirati footballer. He played as a goalkeeper for the United Arab Emirates national football team as well as the Sharjah Club in Sharjah.

Musabah played all of his country's games in qualifying for the 1990 FIFA World Cup and started all three games in the tournament. He was also an important player for his country's run to the final of the 1996 AFC Asian Cup. With over 100 caps to his name, Musabah, who wore the No. 17 jersey throughout his international career, is considered to be the greatest goalkeeper to represent the UAE.

== International career statistics ==
United Arab Emirates national team
Year	Apps	Goals
1988	7	0
1989	9	0
1990	14	0
1991	0	0
1992	14	0
1993	1	0
1994	18	0
1995	0	0
1996	12	0
1997	15	0
1998	11	0
1999	4	0
Total	105	0

== See also ==
- List of men's footballers with 100 or more international caps
