= Ali Thani Jumaa =

Emirati footballer (born 1968)

Ali Thani Juma'a
Personal information
- Full name: Ali Thani Juma'a Alghawi Al-Ali
- Date of birth: 18 August 1968 (age 58)
- Place of birth: Sharjah, United Arab Emirates
- Height: 1.77 m (5 ft 10 in)
- Position: Attacking midfielder

Youth career
- Sharjah FC

Senior career*
Years	Team	Apps	(Gls)
1984–1999	Sharjah FC		(93)

International career
1985–1998	United Arab Emirates	39	(6)
- * Club domestic league appearances and goals

Ali Thani Juma'a Al-Ehawi (Arabic: عَلِيّ ثَانِي جُمْعَة; born 18 August 1968) is an Emirati former professional footballer who played as an attacking midfielder for Sharjah FC and the United Arab Emirates national team. He scored a headed goal against Yugoslavia national team in the 1990 FIFA World Cup.
