= Khalid Ismail =

Emirati footballer (born 1965)

Khalid Ismaïl
Personal information
- Full name: Khalid Ismaïl Mubarak
- Date of birth: 7 July 1965 (age 61)
- Height: 1.78 m (5 ft 10 in)
- Position: Midfielder

International career
Years	Team	Apps	(Gls)
1985−1994	United Arab Emirates	50	(7)

Khalid Ismaïl Mubarak (Arabic: خَالِد إِسْمَاعِيل مُبَارَك; born 7 July 1965) is an Emirati footballer who played as a midfielder for the United Arab Emirates national team and Al-Nasr Club in Dubai. He played in the 1990 FIFA World Cup and scored the first World Cup goal for his country against West Germany.

While it has been reported that he received a Rolls-Royce car from the UAE royal family for his performance at the 1990 World Cup, Ismail stated in a 2010 interview that he never received one.
