= 1990 FIFA World Cup =

Association football tournament in Italy

Coppa del Mondo Italia '90 (Italian)

Tournament details
- Host country: Italy
- Dates: 8 June – 8 July
- Teams: 24 (from 5 confederations)
- Venues: 12 (in 12 host cities)

Final positions
- Champions: West Germany (3rd title)
- Runners-up: Argentina
- Third place: Italy
- Fourth place: England

Tournament statistics
- Matches played: 52
- Goals scored: 115 (2.21 per match)
- Attendance: 2,516,215 (48,389 per match)
- Top scorer: (Italy) Salvatore Schillaci (6 goals)
- Best player: (Italy) Salvatore Schillaci
- Best young player: (Socialist Federal Republic of Yugoslavia) Robert Prosinečki
- Fair play award: England

The 1990 FIFA World Cup was the 14th FIFA World Cup, the quadrennial football tournament for men's senior national teams. It was held from 8 June to 8 July 1990 in Italy, the second country to host the event for a second time (after Mexico in 1986). Teams representing 116 national football associations entered and qualification began in April 1988. Twenty-two teams qualified from this process, along with the host nation Italy and defending champions Argentina.

The tournament was won by West Germany, for the third time. They beat defending champions Argentina 1–0 at the Stadio Olimpico in Rome, a rematch of the previous final four years earlier. Italy ended up finishing third and England fourth, after both lost their semi-finals in penalty shoot-outs. This was the last tournament to feature a team from West Germany, with the country being reunified with East Germany a few months later in October, as well as teams from the Eastern Bloc before the end of the Cold War in 1991, as the Soviet Union, Yugoslavia, and Czechoslovakia teams all made their final appearances. Costa Rica, Ireland and the United Arab Emirates made their first appearances in the finals. As of 2026, this was the only time the United Arab Emirates qualified for a FIFA World Cup finals. Cameroon went on an unexpectedly strong run in the tournament, becoming the first African team to reach the quarter-finals of the World Cup. The official match ball was the Adidas Etrusco Unico.

The 1990 World Cup is widely regarded as one of the poorest World Cups in terms of the games. It generated an average 2.21 goals per game – a record low that still stands – and a then-record 16 red cards, including the first dismissal in a final. However, the tournament had a significant lasting influence on the game as a whole. In England, the team's success in this tournament led to the resurgence of the domestic top-flight, which had suffered from violence on the pitch and hooliganism by spectators throughout the 1980s. It saw the introduction of the pre-match Fair Play Flag (then inscribed with "Fair Play Please") to encourage fair play. Overly defensive tactics of many teams led to the introduction of the back-pass rule in 1992 and three points for a win instead of two, both of which have encouraged attacking play, increasing spectator interest in the sport. The tournament also produced some of the World Cup's best remembered moments and stories, including the emergence of African nations, and Luciano Pavarotti's performance of "Nessun dorma" during the first ever joint concert of The Three Tenors on July 7, shortly before the match for third place which featured the host team.

The 1990 World Cup stands as one of the most watched events in television history, garnering an estimated 26.69 billion non-unique viewers over the course of the tournament. This was the first World Cup officially recorded and transmitted in HDTV, which was a joint effort of the Italian broadcaster RAI and Japan's NHK. The huge success of the broadcasting model also had a lasting impact on the sport around the world. At the time, it was the most watched World Cup in history in non-unique viewers, later bettered only by the 1994 and the 2002 editions of the competition.

== Host selection ==
The vote to choose the hosts of the 1990 tournament was held on 19 May 1984 in Zürich, Switzerland. Here, the FIFA Executive Committee chose Italy ahead of the only rival bid, the USSR, by 11 votes to 5. This awarding made Italy only the second nation to host two World Cup tournaments after Mexico had also achieved this with their 1986 staging, having agreed to replace Colombia as hosts the year before the 1990 hosts were chosen. Italy had previously held the event in 1934, where they had won their first championship.

Austria, England, France, Greece, West Germany and Yugoslavia also submitted initial applications for the 31 July 1983 deadline. A month later, only England, Greece, Italy and the Soviet Union remained in the hunt after the other contenders all withdrew. All four bids were assessed by FIFA in late 1983, with the final decision over-running into 1984 due to the volume of paperwork involved. In early 1984, England and Greece also withdrew, leading to a two-horse race in the final vote. The Soviet boycott of the 1984 Olympic Games, announced on the eve of the World Cup decision, was speculated to have been a major factor behind Italy winning the vote so decisively, although this was denied by the FIFA President João Havelange. The Soviet state media responded by accusing FIFA of political corruption, and blamed the organisation's American sponsors (chiefly Coca-Cola) for influencing the decision.

Iran also planned to host the competition. They proposed it to FIFA in 1977, but a few months later they withdrew their request.

== Qualification ==
116 teams entered the 1990 World Cup, including Italy as host nation and Argentina as reigning World Cup champions, who were both granted automatic qualification. Thus, the remaining 22 finals places were divided among the continental confederations, with 114 initially entering the qualification competition. Due to rejected entries and withdrawals, 103 teams eventually participated in the qualifying stages.

Thirteen places were contested by UEFA teams (Europe), two by CONMEBOL teams (South America), two by CAF teams (Africa), two by AFC teams (Asia), and two by CONCACAF teams (North and Central America and Caribbean). The remaining place was decided by a play-off between a CONMEBOL team and a team from the OFC (Oceania).

After finishing in third place in 1986, France missed the tournament for the first time since the 1974 edition.

Mexico was disqualified during the qualification process for fielding four overage players in a prior youth tournament.

Three teams made their debuts; this was the first World Cup to feature Costa Rica, the Republic of Ireland, and the United Arab Emirates.

Returning after long absences were Egypt, which appeared for the first time since 1934; the United States (which would not miss a World Cup again until 2018), which competed for the first time since 1950; Colombia, which appeared for the first time since 1962; Romania, which last appeared at the Finals in 1970; and Sweden and the Netherlands, both of which last qualified in 1978. Austria, Cameroon, Czechoslovakia and Yugoslavia also returned after missing the 1986 tournament.

=== List of qualified teams ===
The following 24 teams qualified for the final tournament.

AFC (2)

- South Korea
- United Arab Emirates (debut)

CAF (2)

- Egypt
- Cameroon

OFC (0)

- None qualified

CONCACAF (2)

- Costa Rica (debut)
- United States

CONMEBOL (4)

- Argentina (holders)
- Brazil
- Colombia
- Uruguay

UEFA (14)

- Austria
- Belgium
- Czechoslovakia
- England
- Italy (host)
- Netherlands
- Republic of Ireland (debut)
- Romania
- Scotland
- Soviet Union
- Spain
- Sweden
- West Germany
- Yugoslavia

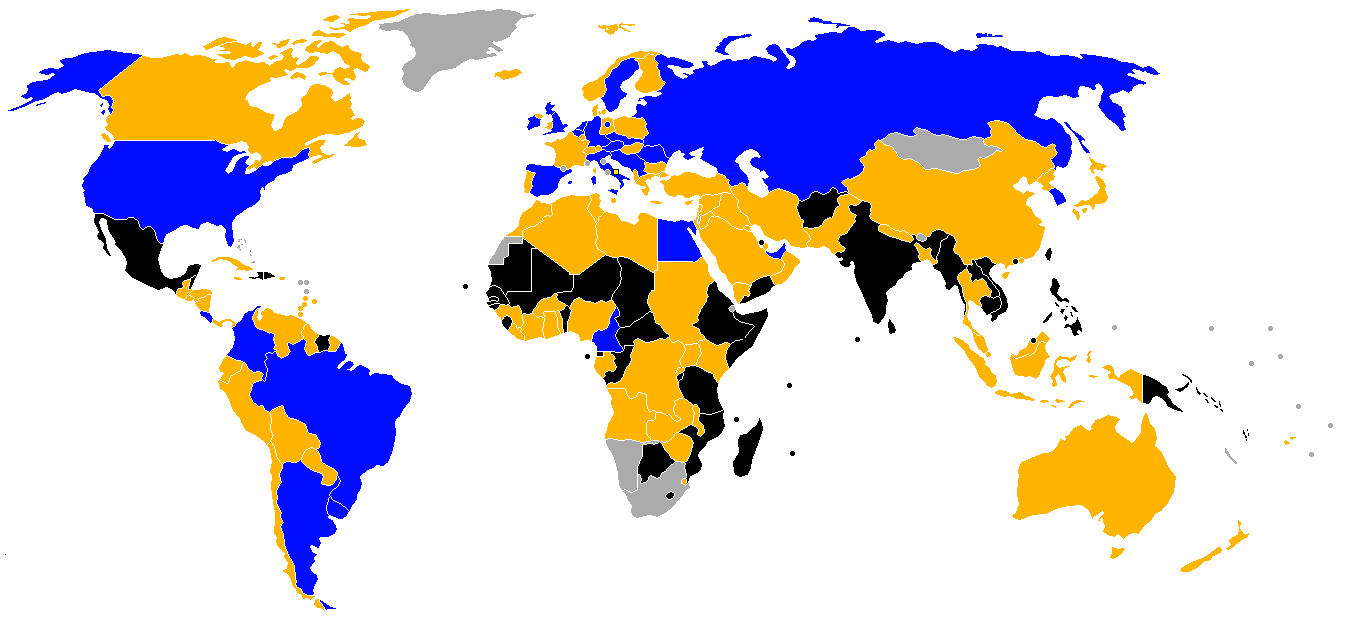
Countries qualified for World Cup Country did not qualify Countries that did not enter the World Cup or were expelled from the tournament by FIFA prior to playing a match Country not a FIFA member

As of 2026, this was the only time the United Arab Emirates qualified for the World Cup and the last time Mexico did not participate in the tournament.

== Venues ==
Twelve stadiums in twelve cities were selected to host matches at the 1990 World Cup. The Stadio San Nicola in Bari and Turin's Stadio delle Alpi were completely new venues opened for the World Cup. Of the twelve stadiums used, only four (San Siro, Luigi Ferraris, Comunale of Florence, and Renato Dall'Ara) had been used for the 1934 FIFA World Cup, while Trieste was the only host city from 1934 not to be selected for the 1990 tournament.

The ten existing venues all underwent extensive programmes of improvements in preparation for the tournament, forcing many of the club tenants of the stadia to move to temporary homes. Additional seating and roofs were added to most stadia, with further redevelopments seeing running tracks removed and new pitches laid. Due to structural constraints, several of the existing stadia had to be virtually rebuilt to implement the changes required.

Like España '82 and México '86, the group stage of this tournament was organised so an individual group only played in two cities in close proximity to each other. Group A only played in Rome and Florence (hosts Italy played all but two competitive matches in Rome: their semi-final match was played in Napoli, and their match for third place in Bari), Group B played their matches in Naples and Bari (except for Argentina vs. Cameroon, which was the opening match of the tournament, played in Milan), Group C played their matches in Turin and Genoa, Group D played all their matches in Milan and Bologna, Group E played only in Udine and Verona, and Group F played in the insular cities of Cagliari and Palermo. The cities that hosted the most World Cup matches were the two biggest cities in Italy: Rome and Milan, each hosting six matches, and Bari, Naples, and Turin each hosted five matches. Cagliari, Udine and Palermo were the only cities of the 12 selected that did not host any knockout round matches.

The England national team, at the British government's request, played all 3 of their group stage matches in Cagliari on the island of Sardinia. Hooliganism, rife in English football in the 1980s had spilled over onto the European continent when 39 mostly Italian Juventus supporters were killed and 600 were injured at the 1985 European Cup Final in Brussels while trying to flee from an attack by Liverpool supporters. This hooliganism had followed the England national team while they played friendlies on the European continent – the distrust of English fans was high enough that the English Football Association's reputation and even diplomatic relations between the UK and Italy were seen to be at risk if England played any group stage matches on the Italian mainland. Thanks largely to British Sports Minister Colin Moynihan's negative remarks about English fans weeks before the match, security around Cagliari during England's three matches there was heavy – in addition to 7,000 local police, the Carabinieri and special forces of the Italian military were also there patrolling the premises. The Italian authorities' presence proved to be justified as there were several riots during the time England were playing their matches in Cagliari, leading to a number of injuries, arrests and even deportations.

Most of the construction cost in excess of their original estimates and total costs ended up being over £550 million (approximately $935 million). Rome's Stadio Olimpico which hosted the final was the most expensive project overall, while Udine's Stadio Friuli, the newest of the existing stadia (opened 14 years prior), cost the least to redevelop.

| Milan | Rome | Turin | Naples |
|---|---|---|---|
| San Siro | Stadio Olimpico | Stadio Delle Alpi | Stadio San Paolo |
| 45°28′41″N 9°7′27″E | 41°56′2″N 12°27′17″E | 45°06′34″N 7°38′29″E | 40°49′41″N 14°11′35″E |
| Capacity: 74,559 | Capacity: 73,603 | Capacity: 62,628 | Capacity: 59,978 |
| Bari | 1990 FIFA World Cup is located in Italy | | Florence |
| Stadio San Nicola | 1990 FIFA World Cup is located in Italy | | Stadio Comunale |
| 41°5′5″N 16°50′24″E | 1990 FIFA World Cup is located in Italy | | 43°46′51″N 11°16′56″E |
| Capacity: 51,426 | 1990 FIFA World Cup is located in Italy | | Capacity: 38,971 |
| Verona | 1990 FIFA World Cup is located in Italy | | Udine |
| Stadio Marc'Antonio Bentegodi | 1990 FIFA World Cup is located in Italy | | Stadio Friuli |
| 45°26′7″N 10°58′7″E | 1990 FIFA World Cup is located in Italy | | 46°4′54″N 13°12′0″E |
| Capacity: 35,950 | 1990 FIFA World Cup is located in Italy | | Capacity: 35,713 |
| Cagliari | Bologna | Palermo | Genoa |
| Stadio Sant'Elia | Stadio Renato Dall'Ara | Stadio La Favorita | Stadio Luigi Ferraris |
| 39°11′58″N 9°8′6″E | 44°29′32″N 11°18′35″E | 38°9′10″N 13°20′32″E | 44°24′59″N 8°57′9″E |
| Capacity: 35,238 | Capacity: 34,520 | Capacity: 33,288 | Capacity: 31,823 |

== Squads ==
Squads for the 1990 World Cup consisted of 22 players, as for the previous tournament in 1986. Replacement of injured players was permitted during the tournament at FIFA's discretion. Two goalkeepers – Argentina's Ángel Comizzo and England's Dave Beasant – entered their respective squads during the tournament to replace injured players (Nery Pumpido and David Seaman).

== Match officials ==
41 match officials from 34 countries were assigned to the tournament to serve as referees and assistant referees. Officials in italics were only used as assistants during the tournament. Referees dressed only in traditional black jerseys for the final time at a World Cup (a red change shirt was used for two Group C games in which Scotland wore their navy blue shirts).

List of match officials

Africa

- (Algeria) Mohamed Hansal
- (Tunisia) Neji Jouini
- (Gabon) Jean-Fidèle Diramba

Asia

- (Syria) Jamal Al Sharif
- (Bahrain) Jassim Mandi
- (Japan) Shizuo Takada

Europe

- (Italy) Luigi Agnolin
- (Spain) Emilio Soriano Aladrén
- (England) George Courtney
- (Italy) Pietro D'Elia
- (Sweden) Erik Fredriksson
- (East Germany) Siegfried Kirschen
- (Austria) Helmut Kohl
- (Italy) Tullio Lanese
- (Poland) Michał Listkiewicz
- (Italy) Rosario Lo Bello
- (Italy) Carlo Longhi
- (Italy) Pierluigi Magni
- (Denmark) Peter Mikkelsen
- (Italy) Pierluigi Pairetto
- (Socialist Federal Republic of Yugoslavia) Zoran Petrović
- (France) Joël Quiniou
- (Switzerland) Kurt Röthlisberger
- (West Germany) Aron Schmidhuber
- (Portugal) Carlos Silva Valente
- (Scotland) George Smith
- (Northern Ireland) Alan Snoddy
- (Soviet Union) Alexey Spirin
- (Belgium) Marcel Van Langenhove
- (France) Michel Vautrot

North and Central America

- (Mexico) Edgardo Codesal
- (United States) Vincent Mauro
- (Costa Rica) Berny Ulloa Morera

Oceania

- (Australia) Richard Lorenc

South America

- (Uruguay) Juan Daniel Cardellino
- (Colombia) Armando Pérez Hoyos
- (Ecuador) Elías Jácome
- (Argentina) Juan Carlos Loustau
- (Paraguay) Carlos Maciel
- (Chile) Hernán Silva
- (Brazil) José Roberto Wright

== Draw ==
=== Seedings ===
The six seeded teams for the 1990 tournament were announced on 7 December 1989, two days ahead of the draw. The FIFA Organising Committee also decided ahead of the draw, to allocate the six seeded teams into the first position of the six groups, in the alphabetic order of their seeding rank: first seed to Group A, second seed to Group B, etc. The seeds were decided by FIFA, primarily based on the nations' ranked position in the 1986 World Cup (counting double), with the ranked position in the 1982 World Cup also considered as a secondary influence (counting normal).

Six of the final eight in 1986 had qualified for the 1990 tournament, the missing nations being Mexico (quarter-final in 1986) and France (third place). Italy did not reach the final eight in 1986, but despite this were still seeded first in 1990 as hosts. In total, the primary seeding criteria hereby resulted in seven countries to be potentially seeded. As the tournament structure only had place for the selection of six seeded teams, this left FIFA needing to exclude one of the six teams qualifying for a seed based on the primary sporting criteria. FIFA first decided, that all qualified teams having played the 1986 semi-finals (Argentina, Germany, Belgium), should be guaranteed a seeding place behind the first seeded host nation Italy. Consequently, one of the three qualified nations who were eliminated in the 1986 quarter-finals (Brazil, England or Spain), should not be seeded based on the secondary sporting criteria – looking at their 1982 FIFA World Cup results.

Owing to their performance in 1982, but also to their overall World Cup record, Brazil were seeded third, and not considered to drop out of the seedings. FIFA therefore had to choose if England or Spain should be granted the last seeding slot, and ultimately opted to seed England ahead of Spain.

Spain had only been eliminated in their 1986 quarter-final on penalties, albeit by fourth-placed Belgium, while England had been defeated in their 1986 quarter-final after 90 minutes by eventual winners Argentina. If the only criteria had been the 1986 ranking, then Spain should have been seeded as #6 instead of England; a viewpoint being supported by FIFA President João Havelange as late as 29 November 1989. If taking the 1982 ranking into consideration, England however had performed slightly better than Spain – as they had finished ahead of them in Group B of the second group stage. If only considering the results of the 1978 event, it could on the other hand have been counter argued, that Spain by their group stage performance and Netherlands by their silver medal accomplishment, should have been seeded rather than England and Belgium who both had failed to qualify.

Spanish officials believed the seeding was contrived to ensure England would be placed in Group F, the group to be held off the Italian mainland, in a bid to contain England's hooliganism problems. Their coach Luis Suárez said, "We feel we've been cheated...they wanted to seed England and to send it to Cagliari at all costs. So they invented this formula". FIFA countered that "the formula was based on the teams' respective showings during the previous two World Cups. England merited the sixth position. This is in no way a concession to English hooliganism".

Meanwhile, the Netherlands also had an argument, that on grounds of recent footballing form, they should be seeded, as the winners of the 1988 European Championship, in which both Spain and England had been eliminated in the group stages, while Belgium (fourth in the 1986 World Cup after beating Spain, and thus seeded in 1990) had failed to even qualify. However, this argument was countered by the fact that Netherlands had themselves failed to qualify for both the 1982 and 1986 World Cups, which was considered the most important factor in the decision not to seed them.

The arguments whether or not seeding positions were justified, mainly existed ahead of the draw, and rapidly fizzled out after the draw, as the two teams considered the most unlucky not to be seeded (Spain and Netherlands), were both drawn in groups against the two teams considered the weakest of the seeded nations (Belgium and England). After the group stage had been completed, England could be said to have justified their seeded position by winning their Group F ahead of Ireland and Netherlands; while Spain seemed to have made their own point about being worth a seeded position, by defeating Belgium to top their own Group E.

| Top Seeded teams (hosts and top 6-ranked from 1982 & 1986) | Pot 1 Africa, Asia & North America (CAF, AFC & CONCACAF) | Pot 2 South America & Europe II (CONMEBOL & UEFA) | Pot 3 Best unseeded from Europe (UEFA) |
|---|---|---|---|
| Italy (hosts, A1) (1st); Argentina (holders, B1) (2nd); Brazil (C1) (3rd); West Germany (D1) (4th); Belgium (E1) (5th); England (F1) (6th) | Cameroon; Costa Rica; Egypt; South Korea; United Arab Emirates; United States | Colombia; Czechoslovakia; Republic of Ireland; Romania; Sweden; Uruguay | Austria; Netherlands; Scotland; Spain; Soviet Union; Yugoslavia |

=== Final draw ===
On 9 December 1989, the draw was conducted at the Palazzo dello Sport in Rome, where the teams were drawn out from the three pots to be placed with the seeded teams in their predetermined groups, in alphabetic order. A special draw decided teams should first be drawn from Pot 1, then from Pot 3, and finally from Pot 2. Each drawn team also had their group position number drawn from a separate group bowl, in order to decide their exact match schedule. The only stipulation of the draw was that no group could feature two South American teams. Hence, a special rule was set up that:

- Pot 2 rule (final version): If the two South American teams (Colombia and Uruguay) are drawn as the second/third team from Pot 2, then they will not go into group B/C – as those two groups are led by the two seeded South American teams (Argentina and Brazil); but instead they will be placed in the next open group in the alphabet led by a seeded European team (Group D/E).

The procedure for the draw, was presented by FIFA at a press meeting the day before the draw. However, after having received objections from Italian officials, FIFA opted to slightly change their special Pot 2 rule, during the last 24 hours ahead of the draw. Before this rule was changed into the final wording given in the paragraph above, it had been intended to say:

- Pot 2 rule (dropped initial version): First two drawn European teams from Pot 2 shall, irrespectively of the alphabet order for the open groups, first be drawn into the two groups led by a seeded South American team (Argentina's Group B and Brazil's Group C); while the two drawn South American teams (Colombia and Uruguay) can not join Group B+C and shall instead be drawn into the first still open group being led by a seeded European team.

This dropped initial wording, would have increased the risk for Italy in Group A to draw one of the difficult two South American teams, instead of one of the easier European teams from Pot 2; because for Italy to get paired with a European Pot 2 team it would have required the less likely event that all three first drawn teams from Pot 2 should be European. When FIFA accepted to change the Pot 2 rule into the final version presented at the televised draw, this lowered the chance for the Italian Group A to draw a South American Pot 2 team, from the 80% chance created by the initial wording to only a 33% chance (two out of six teams).

The ceremony was hosted by Italian television presenter Pippo Baudo, with Italian actress Sophia Loren and opera singer Luciano Pavarotti conducting the draw alongside FIFA general secretary Sepp Blatter. The draw show was FIFA's most ambitious yet with the appearances of Pelé, Bobby Moore, Karl-Heinz Rummenigge, Daniel Passarella, Rubén Sosa and Bruno Conti as well as a performance of the Italian version of the tournament's official song "To Be Number One" by Giorgio Moroder, performed as "Un'estate italiana" by Edoardo Bennato and Gianna Nannini.

The event also featured the official mascot of this World Cup, Ciao, a stick figure player with a football head and an Italian tricolour body that formed the word "ITALIA" when deconstructed and reconstructed. Its name is a greeting in Italian.

=== Results of the draw ===
| Group A | Group B | Group C | Group D | Group E | Group F |
|---|---|---|---|---|---|
| 1. Italy; 2. Austria; 3. United States; 4. Czechoslovakia | 1. Argentina; 2. Cameroon; 3. Soviet Union; 4. Romania | 1. Brazil; 2. Sweden; 3. Costa Rica; 4. Scotland | 1. West Germany; 2. Yugoslavia; 3. United Arab Emirates; 4. Colombia | 1. Belgium; 2. South Korea; 3. Uruguay; 4. Spain | 1. England; 2. Ireland; 3. Netherlands; 4. Egypt |

In each group, the teams would play three matches, one against each of the other teams. Victories would be granted 2 points, while a draw awarded 1 point. After completion of the group stage, the best two teams of each group as well as the four best ranked third places, advanced to round 16 in the knockout stage. This format was identical with the tournament structure being used in 1986. A total of 52 games would be played, including the final and a match for third place between the two semi-final losers.

== Summary of tournament ==
=== Negative tactics ===
The tournament generated a record low goals-per-game average and a then-record of 16 red cards were handed out. In the knockout stage, many teams played defensively for 120 minutes, with the intention of trying their luck in the penalty shoot-out, rather than risk going forward. Two exceptions were the eventual champions West Germany and hosts Italy, the only teams to win three of their four knockout matches in normal time. There were four penalty shoot-outs, a record equalled with the 2006, 2014, and 2018 tournaments, until it was surpassed by the 2022 tournament, with five. Eight matches went to extra time, also a record tied with the 2014 tournament.

Losing finalists Argentina were prime examples of this trend of cautious defensive play, choosing to do so because 3 of their best players were left off the squad due to injury. They scored only five goals in the entire tournament (a record low for a finalist). Argentina also became the first team to advance twice on penalty shoot-outs and the first team to fail to score and have a player sent off in a World Cup final.

Largely as a result of this trend IFAB introduced the back-pass rule in time for the 1994 tournament to make it harder for teams to time-waste by repeatedly passing the ball back for their goalkeepers to pick up. Three, rather than two points would be awarded for victories at future tournaments to help further encourage attacking play.

=== Emergence of Cameroon ===
Cameroon reached the quarter-finals, where they were narrowly defeated by England. They opened the tournament with a shock victory over reigning champions Argentina, before topping the group ahead of them, Romania and European Championship runners-up the Soviet Union. Their success was fired by the goals of Roger Milla, a 38-year-old forward who came out of international retirement to join the national squad at the last moment after a personal request from Cameroonian President Paul Biya. Milla's four goals and flamboyant goal celebrations made him one of the tournament's biggest stars as well as taking Cameroon to the last eight. Most of Cameroon's squad was made up of players who played in France's premier football league, Ligue 1 – French is one of the officially spoken languages in Cameroon, it being a former French territory. In reaching this stage, they had gone further than any African nation had managed in a World Cup before; a feat not surpassed until Morocco reached the semi-final in 2022. Cameroon's feat (equalled by Senegal in 2002 and Ghana in 2010) remains the best by a Sub-Saharan African team. Their success was African football's biggest yet on the world stage and FIFA subsequently decided to allocate the CAF qualifying zone an additional place for the next World Cup tournament.

=== All-champion final four ===
Despite the performances of nations such as Cameroon, Colombia, Ireland, Romania and Costa Rica, the semi-finalists consisted of Argentina, England, Italy and West Germany, all previous World Cup winners, with eight previous titles between them. After the 1970 tournament, this is only the second time in the history of the World Cup this has occurred. The teams which finished first, second and third had also contested both the two previous World Cup Finals between themselves.

== Group stage ==
All times are Central European Summer Time (UTC+2)

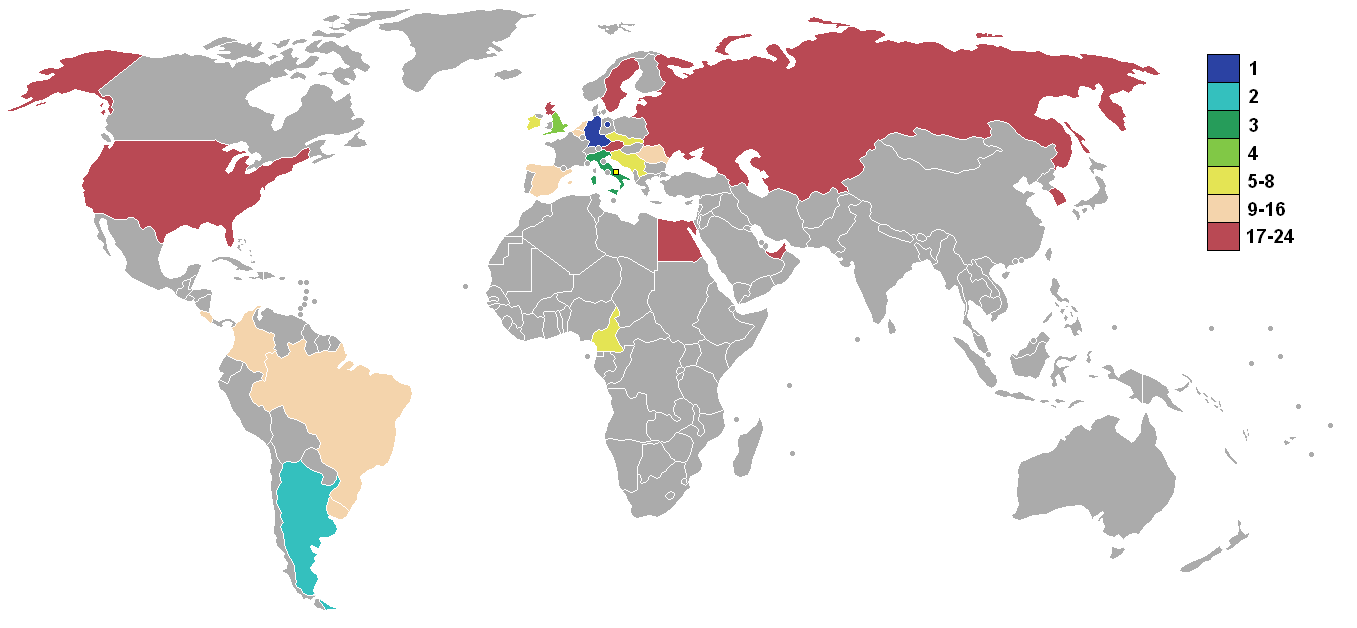
Champion Runner-up Third place Fourth place Quarter-finals Round of 16 Group stage

In the following tables:

- Pld = total games played
- W = total games won
- D = total games drawn (tied)
- L = total games lost
- GF = total goals scored (goals for)
- GA = total goals conceded (goals against)
- GD = goal difference (GF−GA)
- Pts = total points accumulated

The Group stage saw the twenty-four teams divided into six groups of four teams. Each group was a round-robin of six games, in which each team played one match against each of the other teams in the same group. Teams were awarded two points for a win, one point for a draw and none for a defeat. The teams coming first and second in each group qualified for the Round of 16. The four best third-placed teams would also advance to the next stage.

As was typical of a World Cup staged in Europe, the matches all started at either 5:00 or 9:00 in the evening; this allowed for the games to avoid being played in the heat of an Italian summer, which would soar past 86F (30C) all over Italy.

If teams finished level on points, they were to be ranked on the following criteria in order:

1. Greatest total goal difference in the three group matches
2. Greatest number of goals scored in the three group matches
3. Most points earned in matches against other teams in the tie
4. Greatest goal difference in matches against other teams in the tie
5. Greatest number of goals scored in matches against other teams in the tie
6. Drawing of lots

=== Group A ===
Hosts Italy won Group A with a 100 percent record. They beat Austria 1–0 thanks to substitute Salvatore 'Totò' Schillaci, who had played only one international before but would become a star during the tournament. A second 1–0 victory followed against a United States team already thumped 5–1 by Czechoslovakia. The Czechoslovaks ended runners-up in the group, while the USA's first appearance in a World Cup finals since 1950 ended with three consecutive defeats.

| Pos | Team | Pld | W | D | L | GF | GA | GD | Pts | Qualification |
|---|---|---|---|---|---|---|---|---|---|---|
| 1 | Italy (H) | 3 | 3 | 0 | 0 | 4 | 0 | +4 | 6 | Advance to knockout stage |
| 2 | Czechoslovakia | 3 | 2 | 0 | 1 | 6 | 3 | +3 | 4 | Advance to knockout stage |
| 3 | Austria | 3 | 1 | 0 | 2 | 2 | 3 | −1 | 2 | |
| 4 | United States | 3 | 0 | 0 | 3 | 2 | 8 | −6 | 0 | |

Source: FIFA
(H) Hosts
9 June 1990
21:00

| Italy | 1–0 | Austria |
|---|---|---|
| Schillaci 78' |

Stadio Olimpico, Rome
Attendance: 73,303
Referee: José Roberto Wright (Brazil)
10 June 1990
17:00

| United States | 1–5 | Czechoslovakia |
|---|---|---|
| Caligiuri 60' | | Skuhravý 26', 78'; Bílek 40' (pen.); Hašek 50'; Luhový 90+3' |

Stadio Comunale, Florence
Attendance: 33,266
Referee: Kurt Röthlisberger (Switzerland)

14 June 1990
21:00

| Italy | 1–0 | United States |
|---|---|---|
| Giannini 11' |

Stadio Olimpico, Rome
Attendance: 73,423
Referee: Edgardo Codesal (Mexico)
15 June 1990
17:00

| Austria | 0–1 | Czechoslovakia |
|---|---|---|
| | | Bílek 31' (pen.) |

Stadio Comunale, Florence
Attendance: 38,962
Referee: George Smith (Scotland)

19 June 1990
21:00

| Italy | 2–0 | Czechoslovakia |
|---|---|---|
| Schillaci 9'; Baggio 78' |

Stadio Olimpico, Rome
Attendance: 73,303
Referee: Joël Quiniou (France)
19 June 1990
21:00

| Austria | 2–1 | United States |
|---|---|---|
| Ogris 49'; Rodax 63' | | Murray 83' |

Stadio Comunale, Florence
Attendance: 34,857
Referee: Jamal Al Sharif (Syria)

=== Group B ===
Cameroon defeated world champions Argentina 1–0. Despite ending the match with only nine men, the African team held on for a shock 1–0 win, with contrasting fortunes for the Biyik brothers: François Omam-Biyik scoring the winning goal with a downward header, shortly after seeing André Kana-Biyik sent off for a serious foul. Cameroon's second red card was awarded to Benjamin Massing for up-ending Caniggia in the last few minutes as Argentina pressed for an equalizer. In Cameroon's second game, the introduction of Roger Milla was the catalyst for a 2–1 win over Romania, Milla scoring twice from the bench (making him the oldest goalscorer in the tournament). With progression assured, Cameroon slumped to a 4–0 defeat in their final group game to the Soviet Union (in what would be their last World Cup due to the dissolution of the Soviet Union), who were striving to stay in the tournament on goal difference after successive 2–0 defeats. Argentina lost their veteran goalkeeper, Nery Pumpido, to a broken leg during their victory over the USSR: his replacement, Sergio Goycochea, proved to be one of the stars of their tournament. In the final match, a 1–1 draw between Romania and Argentina sent both through, equal on points and on goal difference but with Romania having the advantage on goals scored; Romania were thus second, and Argentina qualified as one of the best third-placed teams.

| Pos | Team | Pld | W | D | L | GF | GA | GD | Pts | Qualification |
|---|---|---|---|---|---|---|---|---|---|---|
| 1 | Cameroon | 3 | 2 | 0 | 1 | 3 | 5 | −2 | 4 | Advance to knockout stage |
| 2 | Romania | 3 | 1 | 1 | 1 | 4 | 3 | +1 | 3 | Advance to knockout stage |
| 3 | Argentina | 3 | 1 | 1 | 1 | 3 | 2 | +1 | 3 | Advance to knockout stage |
| 4 | Soviet Union | 3 | 1 | 0 | 2 | 4 | 4 | 0 | 2 | |

Source: FIFA
8 June 1990
18:00

| Argentina | 0–1 | Cameroon |
|---|---|---|
| | | Omam-Biyik 67' |

San Siro, Milan
Attendance: 73,780
Referee: Michel Vautrot (France)
9 June 1990
17:00

| Soviet Union | 0–2 | Romania |
|---|---|---|
| | | Lăcătuș 41', 55' (pen.) |

Stadio San Nicola, Bari
Attendance: 42,907
Referee: Juan Daniel Cardellino (Uruguay)

13 June 1990
21:00

| Argentina | 2–0 | Soviet Union |
|---|---|---|
| Troglio 27'; Burruchaga 79' |

Stadio San Paolo, Naples
Attendance: 55,759
Referee: Erik Fredriksson (Sweden)
14 June 1990
17:00

| Cameroon | 2–1 | Romania |
|---|---|---|
| Milla 76', 86' | | Balint 88' |

Stadio San Nicola, Bari
Attendance: 38,687
Referee: Hernán Silva (Chile)

18 June 1990
21:00

| Argentina | 1–1 | Romania |
|---|---|---|
| Monzón 62' | | Balint 68' |

Stadio San Paolo, Naples
Attendance: 52,733
Referee: Carlos Silva Valente (Portugal)
18 June 1990
21:00

| Cameroon | 0–4 | Soviet Union |
|---|---|---|
| | | Protasov 20'; Zygmantovich 29'; Zavarov 52'; Dobrovolski 63' |

Stadio San Nicola, Bari
Attendance: 37,307
Referee: José Roberto Wright (Brazil)

=== Group C ===
Costa Rica beat Scotland 1–0 in their first match, lost 1–0 to Brazil in their second, then saw off Sweden 2–1 to claim a place in the second round. Brazil took maximum points from the group. They began with a 2–1 win over Sweden, then beat both Costa Rica and Scotland 1–0. Scotland's 2–1 win over Sweden was not enough to save them from an early return home as one of the two lowest-ranked third-placed teams.

| Pos | Team | Pld | W | D | L | GF | GA | GD | Pts | Qualification |
|---|---|---|---|---|---|---|---|---|---|---|
| 1 | Brazil | 3 | 3 | 0 | 0 | 4 | 1 | +3 | 6 | Advance to knockout stage |
| 2 | Costa Rica | 3 | 2 | 0 | 1 | 3 | 2 | +1 | 4 | Advance to knockout stage |
| 3 | Scotland | 3 | 1 | 0 | 2 | 2 | 3 | −1 | 2 | |
| 4 | Sweden | 3 | 0 | 0 | 3 | 3 | 6 | −3 | 0 | |

Source: FIFA
10 June 1990
21:00

| Brazil | 2–1 | Sweden |
|---|---|---|
| Careca 40', 63' | | Brolin 79' |

Stadio Delle Alpi, Turin
Attendance: 62,628
Referee: Tullio Lanese (Italy)
11 June 1990
17:00

| Costa Rica | 1–0 | Scotland |
|---|---|---|
| Cayasso 49' |

Stadio Luigi Ferraris, Genoa
Attendance: 30,867
Referee: Juan Carlos Loustau (Argentina)

16 June 1990
17:00

| Brazil | 1–0 | Costa Rica |
|---|---|---|
| Müller 33' |

Stadio Delle Alpi, Turin
Attendance: 58,007
Referee: Neji Jouini (Tunisia)
16 June 1990
21:00

| Sweden | 1–2 | Scotland |
|---|---|---|
| Strömberg 85' | | McCall 11'; Johnston 81' (pen.) |

Stadio Luigi Ferraris, Genoa
Attendance: 31,823
Referee: Carlos Maciel (Paraguay)

20 June 1990
21:00

| Brazil | 1–0 | Scotland |
|---|---|---|
| Müller 81' |

Stadio Delle Alpi, Turin
Attendance: 62,502
Referee: Helmut Kohl (Austria)
20 June 1990
21:00

| Sweden | 1–2 | Costa Rica |
|---|---|---|
| Ekström 32' | | Flores 75'; Medford 87' |

Stadio Luigi Ferraris, Genoa
Attendance: 30,223
Referee: Zoran Petrović (Yugoslavia)

=== Group D ===
Group D featured the most goals of all the groups, most due to two large wins of West Germany and defensive inadequacies of a United Arab Emirates team that lost 2–0 to Colombia, 5–1 to West Germany and 4–1 to Yugoslavia. The West Germans topped the group after a 4–1 opening victory over group runners-up Yugoslavia.

| Pos | Team | Pld | W | D | L | GF | GA | GD | Pts | Qualification |
|---|---|---|---|---|---|---|---|---|---|---|
| 1 | West Germany | 3 | 2 | 1 | 0 | 10 | 3 | +7 | 5 | Advance to knockout stage |
| 2 | Yugoslavia | 3 | 2 | 0 | 1 | 6 | 5 | +1 | 4 | Advance to knockout stage |
| 3 | Colombia | 3 | 1 | 1 | 1 | 3 | 2 | +1 | 3 | Advance to knockout stage |
| 4 | United Arab Emirates | 3 | 0 | 0 | 3 | 2 | 11 | −9 | 0 | |

Source: FIFA
9 June 1990
17:00

| United Arab Emirates | 0–2 | Colombia |
|---|---|---|
| | | Redín 50'; Valderrama 85' |

Stadio Renato Dall'Ara, Bologna
Attendance: 30,791
Referee: George Courtney (England)
10 June 1990
21:00

| West Germany | 4–1 | Yugoslavia |
|---|---|---|
| Matthäus 28', 64'; Klinsmann 39'; Völler 70' | | Jozić 55' |

San Siro, Milan
Attendance: 74,765
Referee: Peter Mikkelsen (Denmark)

14 June 1990
17:00

| Yugoslavia | 1–0 | Colombia |
|---|---|---|
| Jozić 75' |

Stadio Renato Dall'Ara, Bologna
Attendance: 32,257
Referee: Luigi Agnolin (Italy)
15 June 1990
21:00

| West Germany | 5–1 | United Arab Emirates |
|---|---|---|
| Völler 35', 75'; Klinsmann 37'; Matthäus 47'; Bein 58' | | Ismaïl 46' |

San Siro, Milan
Attendance: 71,169
Referee: Alexey Spirin (Soviet Union)

19 June 1990
17:00

| West Germany | 1–1 | Colombia |
|---|---|---|
| Littbarski 88' | | Rincón 90+3' |

San Siro, Milan
Attendance: 72,510
Referee: Alan Snoddy (Northern Ireland)
19 June 1990
17:00

| Yugoslavia | 4–1 | United Arab Emirates |
|---|---|---|
| Sušić 5'; Pančev 9', 46'; Prosinečki 90+3' | | Thani 22' |

Stadio Renato Dall'Ara, Bologna
Attendance: 27,833
Referee: Shizuo Takada (Japan)

=== Group E ===
The winners of Group E were Spain, for whom Míchel hit a hat-trick as they beat South Korea 3–1 in an unbeaten group campaign. Belgium won their first two games against South Korea and Uruguay to ensure their progress; Uruguay's advance to the second round came with an injury-time winner against South Korea to edge them through as the weakest of the third-placed sides to remain in the tournament.

| Pos | Team | Pld | W | D | L | GF | GA | GD | Pts | Qualification |
|---|---|---|---|---|---|---|---|---|---|---|
| 1 | Spain | 3 | 2 | 1 | 0 | 5 | 2 | +3 | 5 | Advance to knockout stage |
| 2 | Belgium | 3 | 2 | 0 | 1 | 6 | 3 | +3 | 4 | Advance to knockout stage |
| 3 | Uruguay | 3 | 1 | 1 | 1 | 2 | 3 | −1 | 3 | Advance to knockout stage |
| 4 | South Korea | 3 | 0 | 0 | 3 | 1 | 6 | −5 | 0 | |

Source: FIFA
12 June 1990
17:00

| Belgium | 2–0 | South Korea |
|---|---|---|
| Degryse 53'; De Wolf 64' |

Stadio Marc'Antonio Bentegodi, Verona
Attendance: 32,790
Referee: Vincent Mauro (United States)
13 June 1990
17:00

| Uruguay | 0–0 | Spain |

Stadio Friuli, Udine
Attendance: 35,713
Referee: Helmut Kohl (Austria)

17 June 1990
21:00

| Belgium | 3–1 | Uruguay |
|---|---|---|
| Clijsters 15'; Scifo 22'; Ceulemans 46' | | Bengoechea 72' |

Stadio Marc'Antonio Bentegodi, Verona
Attendance: 33,759
Referee: Siegfried Kirschen (East Germany)
17 June 1990
21:00

| South Korea | 1–3 | Spain |
|---|---|---|
| Hwangbo Kwan 43' | | Míchel 23', 61', 81' |

Stadio Friuli, Udine
Attendance: 32,733
Referee: Elías Jácome (Ecuador)

21 June 1990
17:00

| Belgium | 1–2 | Spain |
|---|---|---|
| Vervoort 29' | | Míchel 26' (pen.); Górriz 38' |

Stadio Marc'Antonio Bentegodi, Verona
Attendance: 35,950
Referee: Juan Carlos Loustau (Argentina)
21 June 1990
17:00

| South Korea | 0–1 | Uruguay |
|---|---|---|
| | | Fonseca 90+1' |

Stadio Friuli, Udine
Attendance: 29,039
Referee: Tullio Lanese (Italy)

=== Group F ===
Group F featured the Netherlands, England, the Republic of Ireland and Egypt. In the six group games, no team managed to score more than once in a match. England beat Egypt 1–0—the only match with a decisive result—and that was enough to win the group. England took the lead with an early goal for Lineker against Ireland, but Sheedy's late equaliser secured a draw. The Netherlands drew with Egypt: they had taken a 1–0 lead, but Egypt equalised with a penalty by Abdelghani. England then drew 0–0 with the Netherlands; a goal from a free-kick by Pearce was disallowed, Pearce having failed to register that it was an indirect free kick, and scoring directly. Lineker also had a goal disallowed for offside. For the second World Cup in succession, however, England lost their captain Bryan Robson to an injury which put him out of the tournament, just over halfway through their second match: he was replaced by David Platt in the side, and by Shilton as captain. Ireland missed a number of scoring opportunities in the second half of the other 0–0 draw against Egypt. After the first four matches all four teams had equal records with two draws, one goal for and one goal against. England's victory over Egypt, thanks to a 58th-minute goal from Mark Wright, put them top of the group: in the other match, Gullit gave the Netherlands the lead against Ireland, but Niall Quinn scored a second-half equaliser and the two teams finished in second and third, still with identical records. Both teams qualified, but they had to draw lots to place the teams in second and third place.

| Pos | Team | Pld | W | D | L | GF | GA | GD | Pts | Qualification |
|---|---|---|---|---|---|---|---|---|---|---|
| 1 | England | 3 | 1 | 2 | 0 | 2 | 1 | +1 | 4 | Advance to knockout stage |
| 2 | Republic of Ireland | 3 | 0 | 3 | 0 | 2 | 2 | 0 | 3 (Note: The Republic of Ireland and the Netherlands finished with identical records. With both teams assured of progressing, they were split by the drawing of lots to determine second and third place.) | Advance to knockout stage |
| 3 | Netherlands | 3 | 0 | 3 | 0 | 2 | 2 | 0 | 3 | Advance to knockout stage |
| 4 | Egypt | 3 | 0 | 2 | 1 | 1 | 2 | −1 | 2 | |

Source: FIFA
Notes:
11 June 1990
21:00

| England | 1–1 | Republic of Ireland |
|---|---|---|
| Lineker 9' | | Sheedy 73' |

Stadio Sant'Elia, Cagliari
Attendance: 35,238
Referee: Aron Schmidhuber (West Germany)
12 June 1990
21:00

| Netherlands | 1–1 | Egypt |
|---|---|---|
| Kieft 58' | | Abdelghani 83' (pen.) |

Stadio La Favorita, Palermo
Attendance: 33,288
Referee: Emilio Soriano Aladrén (Spain)

16 June 1990
21:00

| England | 0–0 | Netherlands |

Stadio Sant'Elia, Cagliari
Attendance: 35,267
Referee: Zoran Petrović (Yugoslavia)
17 June 1990
17:00

| Republic of Ireland | 0–0 | Egypt |

Stadio La Favorita, Palermo
Attendance: 33,288
Referee: Marcel van Langenhove (Belgium)

21 June 1990
21:00

| England | 1–0 | Egypt |
|---|---|---|
| Wright 58' |

Stadio Sant'Elia, Cagliari
Attendance: 34,959
Referee: Kurt Röthlisberger (Switzerland)
21 June 1990
21:00

| Republic of Ireland | 1–1 | Netherlands |
|---|---|---|
| Quinn 71' | | Gullit 11' |

Stadio La Favorita, Palermo
Attendance: 33,288
Referee: Michel Vautrot (France)

=== Ranking of third-placed teams ===
| Pos | Grp | Team | Pld | W | D | L | GF | GA | GD | Pts | Qualification |
|---|---|---|---|---|---|---|---|---|---|---|---|
| 1 | B | Argentina | 3 | 1 | 1 | 1 | 3 | 2 | +1 | 3 | Advance to knockout stage |
| 1 | D | Colombia | 3 | 1 | 1 | 1 | 3 | 2 | +1 | 3 | Advance to knockout stage |
| 3 | F | Netherlands | 3 | 0 | 3 | 0 | 2 | 2 | 0 | 3 | Advance to knockout stage |
| 4 | E | Uruguay | 3 | 1 | 1 | 1 | 2 | 3 | −1 | 3 | Advance to knockout stage |
| 5 | A | Austria | 3 | 1 | 0 | 2 | 2 | 3 | −1 | 2 | |
| 5 | C | Scotland | 3 | 1 | 0 | 2 | 2 | 3 | −1 | 2 | |

Source: FIFA
Rules for classification: 1) Points; 2) Goal difference; 3) Goals scored; 4) Drawing of lots (if deciding qualification).

== Knockout stage ==
The knockout stage involved the 16 teams that qualified from the group stage of the tournament. There were four rounds of matches, with each round eliminating half of the teams entering that round. The successive rounds were: round of 16, quarter-finals, semi-finals and the final. There was also a match for third place. For each game in the knockout stage, any tied score at 90 minutes was followed by 30 minutes of extra time; if scores were still level there would be a penalty shoot-out (five penalties each, if neither team already had a decisive advantage, and more if necessary) to determine who progressed to the next round. Scores after extra time are indicated by (a.e.t.) and penalty shoot-outs are indicated by (pen.).

=== Bracket ===
Round of 16
24 June – Turin
Brazil | 0
Argentina | 1
26 June – Verona
Spain | 1
Yugoslavia (a.e.t.) | 2
25 June – Genoa
Republic of Ireland (p) | 0 (5)
Romania | 0 (4)
25 June – Rome
Italy | 2
Uruguay | 0
23 June – Bari
Czechoslovakia | 4
Costa Rica | 1
24 June – Milan
West Germany | 2
Netherlands | 1
23 June – Naples
Cameroon (a.e.t.) | 2
Colombia | 1
26 June – Bologna
England (a.e.t.) | 1
Belgium | 0

Quarter-finals
30 June – Florence
Argentina (p) | 0 (3)
Yugoslavia | 0 (2)
30 June – Rome
Republic of Ireland | 0
Italy | 1
1 July – Milan
Czechoslovakia | 0
West Germany | 1
1 July – Naples
Cameroon | 2
England (a.e.t.) | 3

Semi-finals
3 July – Naples
Argentina (p) | 1 (4)
Italy | 1 (3)
4 July – Turin
West Germany (p) | 1 (4)
England | 1 (3)

Final
8 July – Rome
Argentina | 0
West Germany | 1
Match for third place
7 July – Bari
Italy | 2
England | 1

All times listed are local (UTC+2)

=== Round of 16 ===
Two of the ties—Brazil vs Argentina and Italy vs Uruguay—pitted former champion countries against each other and West Germany met the Netherlands in a rematch of the 1974 World Cup Final. The all-South American game was won for Argentina by a goal from Claudio Caniggia with 10 minutes remaining after a run through the Brazilian defence by Diego Maradona and a strong performance from their goalkeeper Sergio Goycochea. It would later come to light that Branco had been offered water spiked with tranquillisers by Maradona and Ricardo Giusti during half time, to slow him down in the second half. Initially discredited by the press, Branco would be publicly proven right years later, when Maradona confessed the episode on a TV show in Argentina. Hosts Italy beat Uruguay 2–0, thanks to goals from Schillaci and Aldo Serena.

The match between West Germany and the Netherlands was held in Milan, and both sides featured players from the two Milanese clubs (Germans Andreas Brehme, Lothar Matthäus and Jürgen Klinsmann for Internazionale, and Dutchmen Marco van Basten, Ruud Gullit and Frank Rijkaard for Milan). After 22 minutes Rudi Völler and Rijkaard were both dismissed after a number of incidents between the two players, including Rijkaard spitting on Völler. As the players walked off the pitch together, Rijkaard spat on Völler a second time. Early in the second half, Jürgen Klinsmann put the West Germans ahead and Andreas Brehme added a second with eight minutes left. A Ronald Koeman penalty for the Netherlands in the 89th minute narrowed the score to 2–1 but the Germans saw the game out to gain some revenge for their exit to the Dutch in the previous European Championship.

Meanwhile, in Cameroon v. Colombia, Roger Milla was introduced as a second-half substitute with the game goalless, eventually breaking the deadlock midway in extra time. Three minutes later he netted a second after Colombian goalkeeper, René Higuita was dispossessed by Milla while well out of his goal, leaving the striker free to slot the ball into the empty net. Though the deficit was soon reduced to 2–1, Cameroon held on to become the first African team to reach the World Cup quarter-finals. Costa Rica were beaten 4–1 by Czechoslovakia, for whom Tomáš Skuhravý scored the tournament's second and final hat-trick.

The Republic of Ireland's match with Romania remained goalless after extra time and the Irish side won 5–4 on penalties. David O'Leary converted the penalty that clinched Ireland's place in the quarter-finals. Ireland thus became the first team since Sweden in 1938 to reach the last eight in a World Cup finals tournament without winning a match outright. Yugoslavia beat Spain 2–1 after extra time, with Dragan Stojković scoring both the Yugoslavs' goals. England were the final qualifier against Belgium, as midfielder David Platt's swivelling volley broke the stalemate with the game moments away from a penalty shoot-out.

23 June 1990
17:00

| Cameroon | 2–1 (a.e.t.) | Colombia |
|---|---|---|
| Milla 106', 108' | | Redín 115' |

Stadio San Paolo, Naples
Attendance: 50,026
Referee: Tullio Lanese (Italy)

23 June 1990
21:00

| Czechoslovakia | 4–1 | Costa Rica |
|---|---|---|
| Skuhravý 12', 63', 82'; Kubík 76' | | González 55' |

Stadio San Nicola, Bari
Attendance: 47,673
Referee: Siegfried Kirschen (East Germany)

24 June 1990
17:00

| Brazil | 0–1 | Argentina |
|---|---|---|
| | | Caniggia 81' |

Stadio Delle Alpi, Turin
Attendance: 61,381
Referee: Joël Quiniou (France)

24 June 1990
21:00

| West Germany | 2–1 | Netherlands |
|---|---|---|
| Klinsmann 51'; Brehme 85' | | R. Koeman 89' (pen.) |

San Siro, Milan
Attendance: 74,559
Referee: Juan Carlos Loustau (Argentina)

25 June 1990
17:00

| Republic of Ireland | 0–0 (a.e.t.) | Romania |
Penalties
| Sheedy (penalty scored); Houghton (penalty scored); Townsend (penalty scored); Cascarino (penalty scored); O'Leary (penalty scored) | 5–4 | (penalty scored) Hagi; (penalty scored) Lupu; (penalty scored) Rotariu; (penalty scored) Lupescu; (penalty missed) Timofte |

Stadio Luigi Ferraris, Genoa
Attendance: 31,818
Referee: José Roberto Wright (Brazil)

25 June 1990
21:00

| Italy | 2–0 | Uruguay |
|---|---|---|
| Schillaci 65'; Serena 83' |

Stadio Olimpico, Rome
Attendance: 73,303
Referee: George Courtney (England)

26 June 1990
17:00

| Spain | 1–2 (a.e.t.) | Yugoslavia |
|---|---|---|
| Salinas 84' | | Stojković 78', 93' |

Stadio Marc'Antonio Bentegodi, Verona
Attendance: 35,500
Referee: Aron Schmidhuber (West Germany)

26 June 1990
21:00

| England | 1–0 (a.e.t.) | Belgium |
|---|---|---|
| Platt 119' |

Stadio Renato Dall'Ara, Bologna
Attendance: 34,520
Referee: Peter Mikkelsen (Denmark)

=== Quarter-finals ===
The first game of the last 8 saw Argentina and a Yugoslav side, reduced to 10 men after only half an hour, play out a goalless stalemate. The holders reached the semi-finals after winning the penalty shoot-out 3–2, despite Maradona having his penalty saved. A second Argentine miss (by Pedro Troglio) looked to have eliminated them until goalkeeper Sergio Goycochea – playing because first choice Nery Pumpido broke his leg during the group stage – rescued his side by stopping the Yugoslavs' final two spotkicks.

The Republic of Ireland's World Cup run was brought to an end by a single goal from Schillaci in the first half of their quarter-final with hosts Italy, thus becoming the team who advanced the furthest in a World Cup without winning a single match. West Germany beat Czechoslovakia with a 25th minute Lothar Matthäus penalty.

The quarter-final between England and Cameroon was the only quarter-final to produce more than one goal. Despite Cameroon's heroics earlier in the tournament, David Platt put England ahead in the 25th minute. At half-time, Milla was brought on. In the second half, the game was turned on its head during a five-minute stretch: first Cameroon were awarded a penalty from which Emmanuel Kunde scored the equaliser; then in the 65th minute Eugene Ekeke put Cameroon ahead. Cameroon came within eight minutes of reaching the semi-finals before they conceded a penalty, which Gary Lineker converted. Midway through extra time, England were awarded another penalty and Lineker again scored from the spot. England were through to the semi-finals for the first time since 1966.

30 June 1990
17:00

| Argentina | 0–0 (a.e.t.) | Yugoslavia |
Penalties
| Serrizuela (penalty scored); Burruchaga (penalty scored); Maradona (penalty missed); Troglio (penalty missed); Dezotti (penalty scored) | 3–2 | (penalty missed) Stojković; (penalty scored) Prosinečki; (penalty scored) Savićević; (penalty missed) Brnović; (penalty missed) Hadžibegić |

Stadio Comunale, Florence
Attendance: 38,971
Referee: Kurt Röthlisberger (Switzerland)

30 June 1990
21:00

| Republic of Ireland | 0–1 | Italy |
|---|---|---|
| | | Schillaci 38' |

Stadio Olimpico, Rome
Attendance: 73,303
Referee: Carlos Silva Valente (Portugal)

1 July 1990
17:00

| Czechoslovakia | 0–1 | West Germany |
|---|---|---|
| | | Matthäus 25' (pen.) |

San Siro, Milan
Attendance: 73,347
Referee: Helmut Kohl (Austria)

1 July 1990
21:00

| Cameroon | 2–3 (a.e.t.) | England |
|---|---|---|
| Kundé 61' (pen.); Ekéké 65' | | Platt 25'; Lineker 83' (pen.), 105' (pen.) |

Stadio San Paolo, Naples
Attendance: 55,205
Referee: Edgardo Codesal (Mexico)

=== Semi-finals ===
The first semi-final featured the host nation, Italy, and the world champions, Argentina in Naples. 'Toto' Schillaci scored yet again to put Italy ahead in the 17th minute, but Claudio Caniggia equalised midway through the second half, breaking Walter Zenga's clean sheet streak throughout the tournament. There were no more goals in the 90 minutes or in extra time despite Maradona (who played for Naples in Serie A at the time) showing glimpses of magic, but there was a sending-off: Ricardo Giusti of Argentina was shown the red card in the 13th minute of extra time. Argentina went through on penalties, winning the shoot-out 4–3 after more heroics from Goycochea.

The semi-final between West Germany and England at Juventus' home stadium in Turin was goalless at half-time. Then, in the 60th minute, a free-kick tapped to Andreas Brehme resulted in a shot which was deflected off Paul Parker into his own net. England equalised with ten minutes left; Gary Lineker was the scorer, Parker somewhat redeeming himself by providing the assist. The game ended 1–1. Extra time yielded more chances. Klinsmann was guilty of two glaring misses and both sides struck a post. England had another Platt goal disallowed for offside. The match went to penalties, and West Germany went on to win the shoot-out 4–3, Pearce having his penalty saved and Waddle firing over the bar.

The two matches had the exact same score at 1–1, an identical penalty shoot-out score at 4–3, and the same order of penalties scored.

3 July 1990
20:00

| Argentina | 1–1 (a.e.t.) | Italy |
|---|---|---|
| Caniggia 67' | | Schillaci 17' |
Penalties
| Serrizuela (penalty scored); Burruchaga (penalty scored); Olarticoechea (penalty scored); Maradona (penalty scored) | 4–3 | (penalty scored) Baresi; (penalty scored) Baggio; (penalty scored) De Agostini; (penalty missed) Donadoni; (penalty missed) Serena |

Stadio San Paolo, Naples
Attendance: 59,978
Referee: Michel Vautrot (France)

4 July 1990
20:00

| West Germany | 1–1 (a.e.t.) | England |
|---|---|---|
| Brehme 60' | | Lineker 80' |
Penalties
| Brehme (penalty scored); Matthäus (penalty scored); Riedle (penalty scored); Thon (penalty scored) | 4–3 | (penalty scored) Lineker; (penalty scored) Beardsley; (penalty scored) Platt; (penalty missed) Pearce; (penalty missed) Waddle |

Stadio delle Alpi, Turin
Attendance: 62,628
Referee: José Roberto Wright (Brazil)

=== Match for third place ===
The game saw three goals in a 15-minute spell near the end of the match. Roberto Baggio opened the scoring after a mistake by England's goalkeeper Peter Shilton, in his final game before international retirement, presented a simple opportunity. A header by David Platt levelled the game 10 minutes later but Schillaci was fouled in the penalty area five minutes later, leading to a penalty. Schillaci himself got up to convert the kick to win him the tournament's Golden Boot for his six-goal tally. Nicola Berti had a goal ruled out minutes later, but the hosts claimed third place. England had the consolation prize of the Fair Play award, having received no red cards and the lowest average number of yellows per match.

7 July 1990
20:00

| Italy | 2–1 | England |
|---|---|---|
| Baggio 71'; Schillaci 86' (pen.) | | Platt 81' |

Stadio San Nicola, Bari
Attendance: 51,426
Referee: Joël Quiniou (France)

=== Final ===
The final between West Germany and Argentina has been cited as one of the lowest-quality World Cup finals. In the 65th minute, Argentina's Pedro Monzon – himself only recently on as a substitute – was sent off for a foul on Jürgen Klinsmann. Monzon was the first player sent off in a World Cup final.

Argentina, weakened by suspension and injury, offered little attacking threat throughout a contest dominated by the West Germans, who struggled to create many clear goalscoring opportunities. The only goal of the contest arrived in the 85th minute when Mexican referee Edgardo Codesal awarded a penalty to West Germany, after a foul on Rudi Völler by Roberto Sensini leading to Argentinian protests. An earlier possible foul by Goycoecha, who tripped Klaus Augenthaler in the box, had not been given. German commentators speculated that the subsequent penalty was therefore a concession by the referee. Andreas Brehme converted the spot kick to settle the contest. In the closing moments, Argentina were reduced to nine after Gustavo Dezotti, who had already been given a yellow card earlier in the match, received a red card when he hauled Jürgen Kohler to the ground during a stoppage in play. The 1–0 scoreline provided another first: Argentina were the first team to fail to score in a World Cup final.

With its third title (and three second-place finishes) West Germany – in its final tournament before national reunification – became the most successful World Cup nation at the time along with Italy and Brazil (who had also won three titles each then). West German manager Franz Beckenbauer became the first man to both captain (in 1974) and manage a World Cup winning team, and only the second man (after Mário Zagallo of Brazil) to win the World Cup as a player and as team manager. It was also the first time a team from UEFA won the final against a non-European team.

8 July 1990
20:00 UTC+2

| West Germany | 1–0 | Argentina |
|---|---|---|
| Brehme 85' (pen.) |

Stadio Olimpico, Rome
Attendance: 73,603
Referee: Edgardo Codesal (Mexico)

== Statistics ==
=== Goalscorers ===
Salvatore Schillaci received the Golden Boot award for scoring six goals in the World Cup. This made him the second Italian footballer to have this honour, after Paolo Rossi won the award in 1982. In total, 115 goals were scored by 75 players (none credited as own goals).

6 goals

- (Italy) Salvatore Schillaci

5 goals

- (Czechoslovakia) Tomáš Skuhravý

4 goals

- (Cameroon) Roger Milla
- (England) Gary Lineker
- (Spain) Míchel
- (West Germany) Lothar Matthäus

3 goals

- (England) David Platt
- (West Germany) Andreas Brehme
- (West Germany) Jürgen Klinsmann
- (West Germany) Rudi Völler

2 goals

- (Argentina) Claudio Caniggia
- (Brazil) Careca
- (Brazil) Müller
- (Colombia) Bernardo Redín
- (Czechoslovakia) Michal Bílek
- (Italy) Roberto Baggio
- (Romania) Gabi Balint
- (Romania) Marius Lăcătuș
- (Socialist Federal Republic of Yugoslavia) Davor Jozić
- (Socialist Federal Republic of Yugoslavia) Darko Pančev
- (Socialist Federal Republic of Yugoslavia) Dragan Stojković

1 goal

- (Austria) Andreas Ogris
- (Austria) Gerhard Rodax
- (Argentina) Jorge Burruchaga
- (Argentina) Pedro Monzón
- (Argentina) Pedro Troglio
- (Belgium) Jan Ceulemans
- (Belgium) Lei Clijsters
- (Belgium) Michel De Wolf
- (Belgium) Marc Degryse
- (Belgium) Enzo Scifo
- (Belgium) Patrick Vervoort
- (Cameroon) Eugène Ekéké
- (Cameroon) Emmanuel Kundé
- (Cameroon) François Omam-Biyik
- (Colombia) Freddy Rincón
- (Colombia) Carlos Valderrama
- (Costa Rica) Juan Cayasso
- (Costa Rica) Róger Flores
- (Costa Rica) Rónald González
- (Costa Rica) Hernán Medford
- (Czechoslovakia) Ivan Hašek
- (Czechoslovakia) Luboš Kubík
- (Czechoslovakia) Milan Luhový
- (Egypt) Magdi Abdelghani
- (England) Mark Wright
- (Italy) Giuseppe Giannini
- (Italy) Aldo Serena
- (Netherlands) Ruud Gullit
- (Netherlands) Wim Kieft
- (Netherlands) Ronald Koeman
- (Republic of Ireland) Niall Quinn
- (Republic of Ireland) Kevin Sheedy
- (Scotland) Mo Johnston
- (Scotland) Stuart McCall
- (South Korea) Hwangbo Kwan
- (Soviet Union) Igor Dobrovolski
- (Soviet Union) Oleh Protasov
- (Soviet Union) Oleksandr Zavarov
- (Soviet Union) Andrei Zygmantovich
- (Spain) Alberto Górriz
- (Spain) Julio Salinas
- (Sweden) Tomas Brolin
- (Sweden) Johnny Ekström
- (Sweden) Glenn Strömberg
- (United Arab Emirates) Khalid Ismaïl
- (United Arab Emirates) Ali Thani Jumaa
- (United States) Paul Caligiuri
- (United States) Bruce Murray
- (Uruguay) Pablo Bengoechea
- (Uruguay) Daniel Fonseca
- (West Germany) Uwe Bein
- (West Germany) Pierre Littbarski
- (Socialist Federal Republic of Yugoslavia) Robert Prosinečki
- (Socialist Federal Republic of Yugoslavia) Safet Sušić

=== Discipline ===
| Player | Offence(s) | Suspension(s) |
|---|---|---|
| (Cameroon) André Kana-Biyik | (red card) in Group B vs Argentina (matchday 1; 8 June) | Group B vs Romania (matchday 2; 14 June) |
| (Cameroon) Benjamin Massing | (red card) in Group B vs Argentina (matchday 1; 8 June) | Group B vs Romania (matchday 2; 14 June) |
| (United States) Eric Wynalda | (red card) in Group A vs Czechoslovakia (matchday 1; 10 June) | Group A vs Italy (matchday 2; 14 June) |
| (Soviet Union) Volodymyr Bezsonov | (red card) in Group B vs Argentina (matchday 2; 13 June) | Group B vs Cameroon (matchday 3; 18 June) |
| (Czechoslovakia) Luboš Kubík | (yellow card) in Group A vs United States (matchday 1; 10 June); (yellow card) in Group A vs Austria (matchday 2; 15 June) | Group A vs Italy (matchday 3; 19 June) |
| (United Arab Emirates) Yousuf Hussain | (yellow card) in Group D vs Colombia (matchday 1; 9 June); (yellow card) in Group D vs West Germany (matchday 2; 15 June) | Group D vs Yugoslavia (matchday 3; 19 June) |
| (West Germany) Andreas Brehme | (yellow card) in Group D vs Yugoslavia (matchday 1; 10 June); (yellow card) in Group D vs United Arab Emirates (matchday 2; 15 June) | Group D vs Colombia (matchday 3; 19 June) |
| (Belgium) Eric Gerets | (yellow card) (yellow-red card) in Group E vs Uruguay (matchday 2; 17 June) | Group E vs Spain (matchday 3; 21 June) |
| (Romania) Marius Lăcătuș | (yellow card) in Group A vs Soviet Union (matchday 1; 9 June); (yellow card) in Group A vs Argentina (matchday 3; 18 June) | Round of 16 vs Republic of Ireland (25 June) |
| (Argentina) José Serrizuela | (yellow card) in Group A vs Soviet Union (matchday 2; 13 June); (yellow card) in Group A vs Romania (matchday 3; 18 June) | Round of 16 vs Brazil (24 June) |
| (Cameroon) André Kana-Biyik | (yellow card) in Group B vs Soviet Union (matchday 3; 18 June); (yellow card) in Round of 16 vs Colombia (23 June) | Quarter-finals vs England (1 July) |
| (Cameroon) Victor N'Dip | (yellow card) in Group B vs Argentina (matchday 1; 8 June); (yellow card) in Round of 16 vs Colombia (23 June) | Quarter-finals vs England (1 July) |
| (Cameroon) Emile M'Bouh | (yellow card) in Group B vs Argentina (matchday 1; 8 June); (yellow card) in Round of 16 vs Colombia (23 June) | Quarter-finals vs England (1 July) |
| (Cameroon) Jules Onana | (yellow card) in Group B vs Romania (matchday 2; 14 June); (yellow card) in Round of 16 vs Colombia (23 June) | Quarter-finals vs England (1 July) |
| (Argentina) Pedro Monzón | (yellow card) in Group A vs Soviet Union (matchday 2; 13 June); (yellow card) in Round of 16 vs Brazil (24 June) | Quarter-finals vs Yugoslavia (30 June) |
| (West Germany) Rudi Völler | (red card) in Round of 16 vs Netherlands (24 June) | Quarter-finals vs Czechoslovakia (1 July) |
| (Italy) Nicola Berti | (yellow card) in Group A vs Czechoslovakia (matchday 3; 19 June); (yellow card) in Round of 16 vs Uruguay (25 June) | Quarter-finals vs Republic of Ireland (30 June) |
| (Argentina) Ricardo Giusti | (yellow card) (yellow-red card) in Semi-finals vs Italy (3 July) | Final vs West Germany (8 July) |
| (Argentina) Julio Olarticoechea | (yellow card) in Quarter-finals vs Yugoslavia (30 June); (yellow card) in Semi-finals vs Italy (3 July) | Final vs West Germany (8 July) |
| (Argentina) Claudio Caniggia | (yellow card) in Group B vs Soviet Union (matchday 2; 13 June); (yellow card) in Semi-finals vs Italy (3 July) | Final vs West Germany (8 July) |
| (Argentina) Sergio Batista | (yellow card) in Group B vs Romania (matchday 3; 18 June); (yellow card) in Semi-finals vs Italy (3 July) | Final vs West Germany (8 July) |
| (England) Paul Gascoigne | (yellow card) in Round of 16 vs Belgium (26 June); (yellow card) in Semi-finals vs West Germany (4 July) | Match for third place vs Italy (7 July) |

=== Awards ===
| Golden Boot | Best Young Player | FIFA Fair Play Trophy |
|---|---|---|
| (Italy) Salvatore Schillaci | (Socialist Federal Republic of Yugoslavia) Robert Prosinečki | England |

Golden Ball
| Rank | Player | Points |
|---|---|---|
| 1st | (Italy) Salvatore Schillaci | 1629 |
| 2nd | (West Germany) Lothar Matthäus | 1036 |
| 3rd | (Argentina) Diego Maradona | 802 |
| 4th | (Cameroon) Roger Milla | — |
| 5th | (West Germany) Jürgen Klinsmann | — |
| 6th | (Italy) Roberto Baggio | — |

=== All-star team ===
FIFA published the first All-Star Team in 1938, but it never made an All-Star Team again until 1990 due to ensuing complaints. In 1990 an All-Star Team was announced in combination with the Golden Ball ceremony. It was chosen by the same journalists who chose the best player.

| Goalkeeper | Defenders | Midfielders | Forwards | Reserves |
|---|---|---|---|---|
| (Brazil) Claudio Taffarel | (Brazil) Jorginho (Italy) Giuseppe Bergomi (Italy) Franco Baresi (West Germany) Guido Buchwald (West Germany) Andreas Brehme | (Italy) Roberto Donadoni (West Germany) Lothar Matthäus (Belgium) Enzo Scifo | (Italy) Salvatore Schillaci (West Germany) Jürgen Klinsmann | (Costa Rica) Gabelo Conejo (Brazil) Branco (England) Des Walker (Socialist Federal Republic of Yugoslavia) Dragan Stojković (Cameroon) Roger Milla |

=== Tournament ranking ===
Per statistical convention in football, matches decided in extra time are counted as wins and losses, while matches decided by penalty shoot-outs are counted as draws.

| Pos | Grp | Team | Pld | W | D | L | GF | GA | GD | Pts | Final result |
|---|---|---|---|---|---|---|---|---|---|---|---|
| 1 | D | West Germany | 7 | 5 | 2 | 0 | 15 | 5 | +10 | 12 | Champions |
| 2 | B | Argentina | 7 | 2 | 3 | 2 | 5 | 4 | +1 | 7 | Runners-up |
| 3 | A | Italy (H) | 7 | 6 | 1 | 0 | 10 | 2 | +8 | 13 | Third place |
| 4 | F | England | 7 | 3 | 3 | 1 | 8 | 6 | +2 | 9 | Fourth place |
| 5 | D | Yugoslavia | 5 | 3 | 1 | 1 | 8 | 6 | +2 | 7 | Eliminated in quarterfinals |
| 6 | A | Czechoslovakia | 5 | 3 | 0 | 2 | 10 | 5 | +5 | 6 | Eliminated in quarterfinals |
| 7 | B | Cameroon | 5 | 3 | 0 | 2 | 7 | 9 | −2 | 6 | Eliminated in quarterfinals |
| 8 | F | Republic of Ireland | 5 | 0 | 4 | 1 | 2 | 3 | −1 | 4 | Eliminated in quarterfinals |
| 9 | C | Brazil | 4 | 3 | 0 | 1 | 4 | 2 | +2 | 6 | Eliminated in round of 16 |
| 10 | E | Spain | 4 | 2 | 1 | 1 | 6 | 4 | +2 | 5 | Eliminated in round of 16 |
| 11 | E | Belgium | 4 | 2 | 0 | 2 | 6 | 4 | +2 | 4 | Eliminated in round of 16 |
| 12 | B | Romania | 4 | 1 | 2 | 1 | 4 | 3 | +1 | 4 | Eliminated in round of 16 |
| 13 | C | Costa Rica | 4 | 2 | 0 | 2 | 4 | 6 | −2 | 4 | Eliminated in round of 16 |
| 14 | D | Colombia | 4 | 1 | 1 | 2 | 4 | 4 | 0 | 3 | Eliminated in round of 16 |
| 15 | F | Netherlands | 4 | 0 | 3 | 1 | 3 | 4 | −1 | 3 | Eliminated in round of 16 |
| 16 | E | Uruguay | 4 | 1 | 1 | 2 | 2 | 5 | −3 | 3 | Eliminated in round of 16 |
| 17 | B | Soviet Union | 3 | 1 | 0 | 2 | 4 | 4 | 0 | 2 | Eliminated in group stage |
| =18 | A | Austria | 3 | 1 | 0 | 2 | 2 | 3 | −1 | 2 | Eliminated in group stage |
| =18 | C | Scotland | 3 | 1 | 0 | 2 | 2 | 3 | −1 | 2 | Eliminated in group stage |
| 20 | F | Egypt | 3 | 0 | 2 | 1 | 1 | 2 | −1 | 2 | Eliminated in group stage |
| 21 | C | Sweden | 3 | 0 | 0 | 3 | 3 | 6 | −3 | 0 | Eliminated in group stage |
| 22 | E | South Korea | 3 | 0 | 0 | 3 | 1 | 6 | −5 | 0 | Eliminated in group stage |
| 23 | A | United States | 3 | 0 | 0 | 3 | 2 | 8 | −6 | 0 | Eliminated in group stage |
| 24 | D | United Arab Emirates | 3 | 0 | 0 | 3 | 2 | 11 | −9 | 0 | Eliminated in group stage |

Source: FIFA
(H) Hosts

=== Records ===
- Most wins: Italy (6)
- Fewest wins: Egypt, Netherlands, Republic of Ireland, South Korea, Sweden, United Arab Emirates, United States (0)
- Most defeats: South Korea, Sweden, United Arab Emirates, United States (3)
- Fewest defeats: Italy, West Germany (0)
- First goal: François Omam Biyik (for Cameroon vs Argentina; Group B, 8 June)
- Fastest goal in a match: 3 minutes 59 seconds – Safet Sušić (for Yugoslavia vs United Arab Emirates; Group D, 19 June)
- Latest goal scored in a match (apart from penalty shoot-outs): 119 minutes – David Platt (for England vs Belgium; Round of 16, 26 June)
- Biggest win: 5–1 – by Czechoslovakia vs United States, and by West Germany vs United Arab Emirates
- Most goals in the tournament (team): West Germany (15)
- Most goals in the tournament (player): Salvatore Schillaci (Italy) (6)
- Fewest goals in the tournament (team): Egypt and South Korea (1)
- Most goals in a game: 6 (United States 1 Czechoslovakia 5; West Germany 5 United Arab Emirates 1)
- Most goals in a game (player): 3, by Míchel (for Spain vs South Korea) and Tomáš Skuhravý (for Czechoslovakia vs Costa Rica)
- Fewest goals conceded: Brazil, Egypt and Italy (2)
- Total goals scored: 115 (average 2.21 goals per game, a record low in World Cup history)
- Most clean sheets: Italy (5) (that record would also be broken by Spain and its goalkeeper, Unai Simón, however, in the 2026 edition of the tourney, as that team held its first six opponents scoreless, before that goal scored by Belgium in the quarterfinals.)
- Total penalties awarded: 18 (13 scored, 5 missed)
- Most yellow cards in a game: 9 – Austria vs United States (Group A, 19 June)
- Most yellow cards in the tournament: Argentina (22)
- Total yellow cards: 162
- Most red cards in the tournament: Argentina (3)
- Total red cards: 16 (a record high for a 24 team World Cup)
- Highest attendance: 74,765 – West Germany vs Yugoslavia (Group D, 10 June)
- Lowest attendance: 27,833 – Yugoslavia vs United Arab Emirates (Group D, 19 June)
- Average attendance: 48,391 (5th highest in World Cup history)
- Oldest player: Peter Shilton (England) (40 years 292 days)
- Youngest player: Rónald González Brenes (Costa Rica) (19 years 307 days)
- Italy's performance of 6 wins, 1 draw and 0 losses is the highest winning percentage for a team that did not win the World Cup.
- The Republic of Ireland became the second team in World Cup history to reach the last eight without winning a match (Sweden progressed to the last eight by default in 1938 when Austria withdrew).

== Marketing ==
=== Sponsorship ===
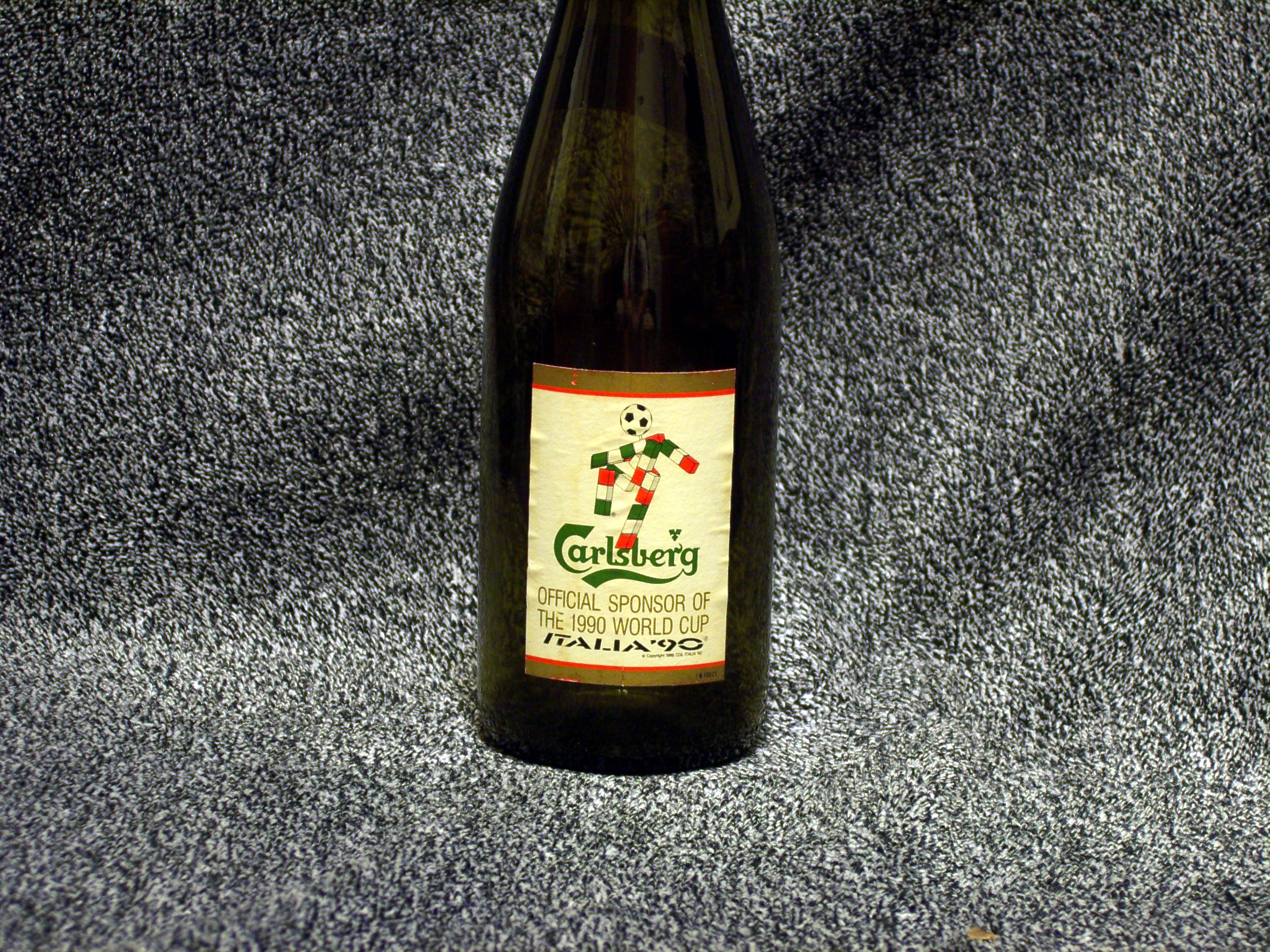
Carlsberg was one of the sponsors of FIFA World Cup 1990.

The sponsors of the 1990 FIFA World Cup are divided into two categories: FIFA World Cup Sponsors and Italy Supporters.

| FIFA World Cup sponsors | Italy Supporters |
|---|---|
| Adidas; Budweiser; Canon; Carlsberg; Coca-Cola; Fujifilm; G-Shock; Gillette; JVC; Le Coq Sportif; Mars Inc.; Philips | Alfa Romeo; Alitalia; Barilla; Fiat; Grana Padano; Iveco; Radio Corriere TV; Vini d'Italia; UNICEF |

== Symbols ==
=== Mascot ===
The official mascot of this World Cup was "Ciao", a stick figure player with a football head and an Italian tricolore body. Its name is an Italian greeting.

=== Match ball ===
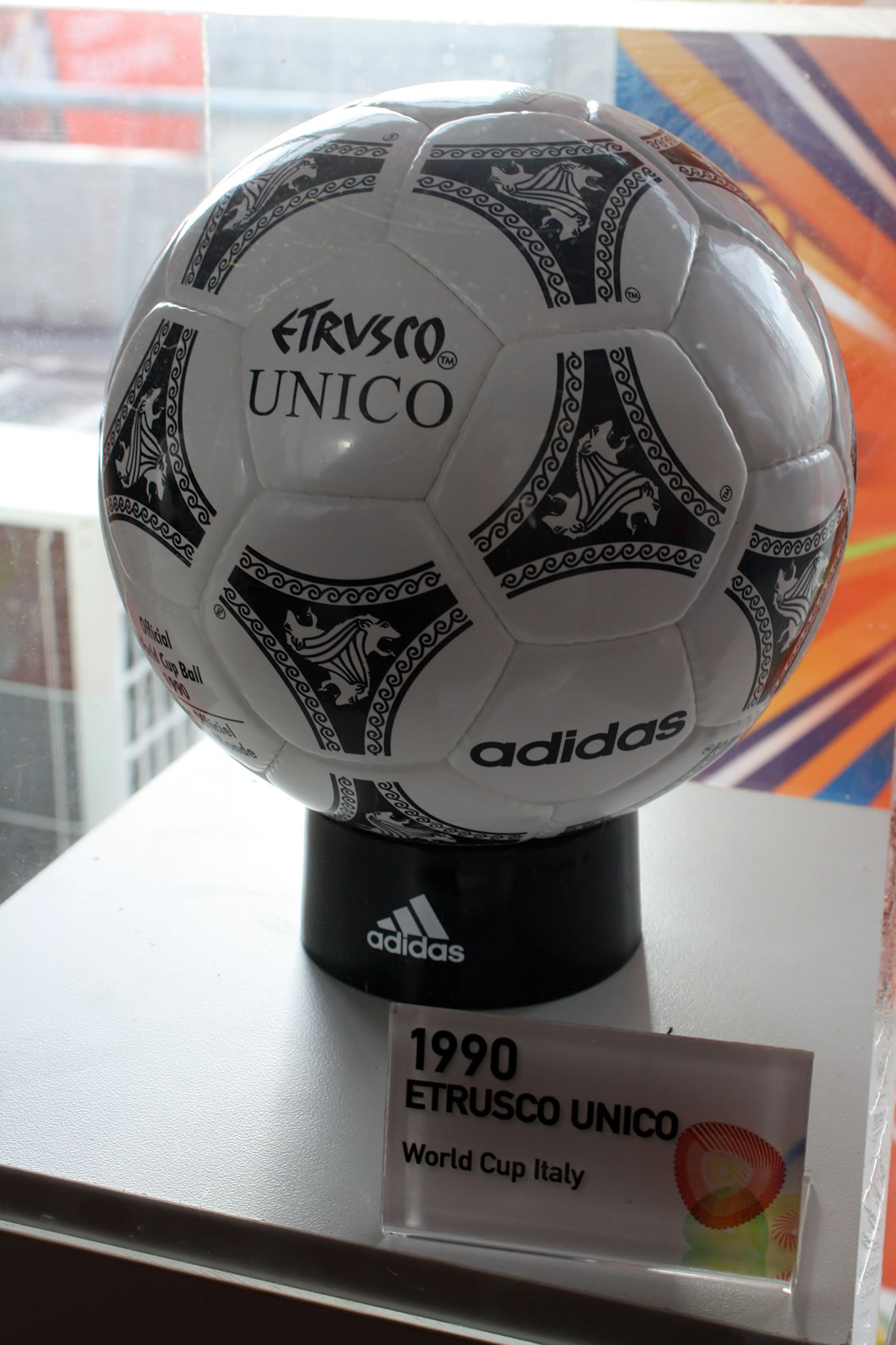
Adidas Etrusco Unico

The official match ball of this World Cup was the "Etrusco Unico", manufactured by Adidas.

=== Music ===
The official song of this World Cup was "Un'estate italiana".

== See also ==
- Sir Bobby Robson Trophy match, a 2009 replay of the 1990 England Germany semi-final in honour of the England manager Bobby Robson
