= 1990 FIFA World Cup knockout stage =

Football tournament

The knockout stage of the 1990 FIFA World Cup was the second and final stage of the final tournament, following the group stage. It began on 23 June with the round of 16 matches, and ended on 8 July with the final held at the Stadio Olimpico in Rome, in which West Germany beat the defending champions Argentina 1–0 to claim their third World Cup.

Sixteen teams advanced to the knockout stage to compete in a single-elimination style tournament: The top two teams from each of the six groups, as well as the best four third-placed teams. In the round of 16, the four third-placed teams played against four of the group winners from group A-D, with the remaining two group winners from group E and F taking on two of the group runners-up; the remaining four runners-up were paired off against each other. The winners of the eight round of 16 matches were then paired together in the quarter-finals, the winners of which played against each other in the semi-finals.

The ties in each round were played over a single match; in the event that scores were level after 90 minutes, the teams would play an additional 30 minutes of extra time, divided into two 15-minute halves, to determine the winner. If the scores remained level after extra time, the teams would contest a penalty shoot-out.

A match for third place was also held on the day before the final, between the two losing teams of the semi-finals.

All times listed are local (UTC+2)

== Qualified teams ==
The top two placed teams from each of the six groups, plus the four best-placed third teams, qualified for the knockout stage.

Group	Winners	Runners-up	Third-placed teams (Best four qualify)
A	Italy	Czechoslovakia	—N/a
B	Cameroon	Romania	Argentina
C	Brazil	Costa Rica	—N/a
D	West Germany	Yugoslavia	Colombia
E	Spain	Belgium	Uruguay
F	England	Republic of Ireland	Netherlands

Based on group results, the matches would be the following in Round of 16:

Round of 16	Teams per qualified group positions	Teams identified
Match 1:	C1 – A3/B3/F3	Brazil – Argentina
Match 2:	E1 – D2	Spain – Yugoslavia
Match 3:	B2 – F2	Romania – Ireland
Match 4:	A1 – C3/D3/E3	Italy – Uruguay
Match 5:	A2 – C2	Czechoslovakia – Costa Rica
Match 6:	D1 – B3/E3/F3	West Germany – Netherlands
Match 7:	B1 – A3/C3/D3	Cameroon – Colombia
Match 8:	F1 – E2	England – Belgium

The pairings for matches 1, 4, 6 and 7 depend on who the best third places are that qualify for the round of 16. The following table published in Section 28 of the tournament regulations, shows the 15 different options to define the opponents for the winners of groups A, B, C and D.

Combination according to the four qualified teams

Third teams qualify from groups:	Italy (A1) plays vs.:	Cameroon (B1) plays vs.:	Brazil (C1) plays vs.:	West Germany (D1) plays vs.:
A B C D	C3	D3	A3	B3
A B C E	C3	A3	B3	E3
A B C F	C3	A3	B3	F3
A B D E	D3	A3	B3	E3
A B D F	D3	A3	B3	F3
A B E F	E3	A3	B3	F3
A C D E	C3	D3	A3	E3
A C D F	C3	D3	A3	F3
A C E F	C3	A3	F3	E3
A D E F	D3	A3	F3	E3
B C D E	C3	D3	B3	E3
B C D F	C3	D3	B3	F3
B C E F	E3	C3	B3	F3
B D E F	E3	D3	B3	F3
C D E F	C3	D3	F3	E3

== Bracket ==
Round of 16
24 June – Turin
Brazil	0
Argentina	1
26 June – Verona
Spain	1
Yugoslavia (a.e.t.)	2
25 June – Genoa
Republic of Ireland (p)	0 (5)
Romania	0 (4)
25 June – Rome
Italy	2
Uruguay	0
23 June – Bari
Czechoslovakia	4
Costa Rica	1
24 June – Milan
West Germany	2
Netherlands	1
23 June – Naples
Cameroon (a.e.t.)	2
Colombia	1
26 June – Bologna
England (a.e.t.)	1
Belgium	0

Quarter-finals
30 June – Florence
Argentina (p)	0 (3)
Yugoslavia	0 (2)
30 June – Rome
Republic of Ireland	0
Italy	1
1 July – Milan
Czechoslovakia	0
West Germany	1
1 July – Naples
Cameroon	2
England (a.e.t.)	3

Semi-finals
3 July – Naples
Argentina (p)	1 (4)
Italy	1 (3)
4 July – Turin
West Germany (p)	1 (4)
England	1 (3)

Final
8 July – Rome
Argentina	0
West Germany	1
Match for third place
7 July – Bari
Italy	2
England	1

== Round of 16 ==
=== Cameroon vs Colombia ===
23 June 1990
17:00

Cameroon	2–1 (a.e.t.)	Colombia
Milla 106', 108'		Redín 115'

Stadio San Paolo, Naples
Attendance: 50,026
Referee: Tullio Lanese (Italy)

Cameroon	Colombia

GK	16	Thomas N'Kono
SW	17	Victor N'Dip	(yellow card) 47'
DF	14	Stephen Tataw (c)
DF	3	Jules Onana	(yellow card) 117'
DF	2	André Kana-Biyik	(yellow card) 44'
DF	5	Bertin Ebwellé
MF	8	Emile M'Bouh	(yellow card) 68'
MF	21	Emmanuel Maboang
MF	10	Louis-Paul Mfédé		(substituted off) 54'
FW	7	François Omam-Biyik
FW	20	Cyril Makanaky		(substituted off) 69'
Substitutes:
GK	22	Jacques Songo'o
DF	4	Benjamin Massing
DF	6	Emmanuel Kundé
FW	9	Roger Milla		(substituted on) 54'
FW	18	Bonaventure Djonkep		(substituted on) 69'
Manager:
(Soviet Union) Valery Nepomnyashchy

GK	1	René Higuita
DF	4	Luis Fernando Herrera
DF	15	Luis Carlos Perea	(yellow card) 72'
DF	2	Andrés Escobar
DF	3	Gildardo Gómez
MF	8	Gabriel Gómez	(yellow card) 74'	(substituted off) 79'
MF	14	Leonel Álvarez
MF	20	Luis Fajardo		(substituted off) 63'
MF	10	Carlos Valderrama (c)
FW	19	Freddy Rincón
FW	7	Carlos Estrada
Substitutes:
GK	12	Eduardo Niño
FW	9	Miguel Guerrero
MF	11	Bernardo Redín		(substituted on) 79'
FW	16	Arnoldo Iguarán		(substituted on) 63'
DF	21	Alexis Mendoza
Manager:
Francisco Maturana

Assistant referees:
Jamal Al Sharif (Syria)
Berny Ulloa Morera (Costa Rica)

=== Czechoslovakia vs Costa Rica ===
23 June 1990
21:00

Czechoslovakia	4–1	Costa Rica
Skuhravý 12', 63', 82'; Kubík 76'		González 55'

Stadio San Nicola, Bari
Attendance: 47,673
Referee: Siegfried Kirschen (East Germany)

Czechoslovakia	Costa Rica

GK	1	Jan Stejskal
DF	5	Ján Kocian	(yellow card) 56'
DF	3	Miroslav Kadlec
DF	9	Luboš Kubík
DF	6	František Straka	(yellow card) 68'
MF	4	Ivan Hašek (c)	(yellow card) 53'
MF	11	Ľubomír Moravčík
MF	8	Jozef Chovanec
MF	7	Michal Bílek
FW	10	Tomáš Skuhravý
FW	17	Ivo Knoflíček
Substitutions:
GK	21	Luděk Mikloško
MF	14	Vladimír Weiss
MF	18	Milan Luhový
FW	19	Stanislav Griga
MF	20	Václav Němeček
Manager:
Jozef Vengloš

GK	21	Hermidio Barrantes
DF	3	Róger Flores (c)
DF	4	Rónald González Brenes	(yellow card) 6'
DF	20	Mauricio Montero
DF	5	Marvin Obando		(substituted off) 46'
DF	6	José Carlos Chaves
MF	8	Germán Chavarría		(substituted off) 65'
MF	19	Héctor Marchena	(yellow card) 75'
MF	14	Juan Cayasso
FW	10	Óscar Ramírez
FW	11	Claudio Jara
Substitutions:
GK	22	Miguel Segura
FW	7	Hernán Medford		(substituted on) 46'
FW	9	Alexandre Guimarães		(substituted on) 65'
MF	17	Roy Myers
DF	18	Geovanny Jara
Manager:
(Socialist Federal Republic of Yugoslavia) Bora Milutinović

Assistant referees:
Armando Pérez Hoyos (Colombia)
Pietro d'Elia (Italy)

=== Brazil vs Argentina ===
External videos
- Brazil v Argentina (Italy 1990) Full match on YouTube

Brazil dominated for most of the match, but Diego Maradona went on a trademark run from the halfway line to the edge of the penalty area late in the match, and found Claudio Caniggia, who rounded the onrushing Cláudio Taffarel to give Argentina a lead that they would not relinquish.

As of 2026, this is the last time Argentina played Brazil in a World Cup tournament.

24 June 1990
17:00

Brazil	0–1	Argentina
		Caniggia 81'

Stadio Delle Alpi, Turin
Attendance: 61,381
Referee: Joël Quiniou (France)

Brazil	Argentina

GK	1	Cláudio Taffarel
SW	21	Mauro Galvão	(yellow card) 50'	(substituted off) 84'
CB	19	Ricardo Rocha	(yellow card) 40'
CB	3	Ricardo Gomes (c)	(red card) 85'
RM	2	Jorginho
CM	4	Dunga
CM	5	Alemão		(substituted off) 84'
LM	6	Branco
AM	8	Valdo
FW	15	Müller
FW	9	Careca
Substitutes:
GK	22	Zé Carlos
AM	10	Paulo Silas		(substituted on) 84'
CB	13	Carlos Mozer
FW	17	Renato Gaúcho		(substituted on) 84'
RM	18	Mazinho
Manager:
Sebastião Lazaroni

GK	12	Sergio Goycochea	(yellow card) 87'
SW	20	Juan Simón
DF	15	Pedro Monzón	(yellow card) 27'
DF	19	Oscar Ruggeri
MF	4	José Basualdo
MF	21	Pedro Troglio		(substituted off) 61'
MF	14	Ricardo Giusti	(yellow card) 28'
MF	16	Julio Olarticoechea
MF	7	Jorge Burruchaga
FW	8	Claudio Caniggia
FW	10	Diego Maradona (c)
Substitutes:
GK	22	Fabián Cancelarich
MF	2	Sergio Batista
MF	6	Gabriel Calderón		(substituted on) 61'
FW	9	Gustavo Dezotti
DF	13	Néstor Lorenzo
Manager:
Carlos Bilardo

Assistant referees:
Alexey Spirin (Soviet Union)
Pierluigi Pairetto (Italy)

=== West Germany vs Netherlands ===
24 June 1990
21:00

West Germany	2–1	Netherlands
Klinsmann 51'; Brehme 85'		R. Koeman 89' (pen.)

San Siro, Milan
Attendance: 74,559
Referee: Juan Carlos Loustau (Argentina)

West Germany	Netherlands

GK	1	Bodo Illgner
SW	5	Klaus Augenthaler
RB	2	Stefan Reuter
CB	4	Jürgen Kohler
CB	14	Thomas Berthold
LB	3	Andreas Brehme
MF	7	Pierre Littbarski
MF	10	Lothar Matthäus (c)	(yellow card) 77'
MF	6	Guido Buchwald
FW	9	Rudi Völler	(yellow card) 21' (red card) 22'
FW	18	Jürgen Klinsmann		(substituted off) 77'
Substitutes:
GK	12	Raimond Aumann
FW	13	Karl-Heinz Riedle		(substituted on) 77'
DF	16	Paul Steiner
MF	17	Andreas Möller
MF	20	Olaf Thon
Manager:
Franz Beckenbauer

GK	1	Hans van Breukelen
RB	2	Berry van Aerle		(substituted off) 66'
CB	4	Ronald Koeman
CB	3	Frank Rijkaard	(yellow card) 21' (red card) 22'
LB	5	Adri van Tiggelen
MF	14	John van 't Schip
MF	6	Jan Wouters	(yellow card) 32'
MF	20	Aron Winter
MF	11	Richard Witschge		(substituted off) 78'
FW	9	Marco van Basten	(yellow card) 72'
FW	10	Ruud Gullit (c)
Substitutes:
GK	16	Joop Hiele
FW	12	Wim Kieft		(substituted on) 66'
DF	13	Graeme Rutjes
FW	17	Hans Gillhaus		(substituted on) 78'
DF	21	Danny Blind
Manager:
Leo Beenhakker

Assistant referees:
Elías Jácome (Ecuador)
Vincent Mauro (United States)

=== Republic of Ireland vs Romania ===
25 June 1990
17:00

Republic of Ireland	0–0 (a.e.t.)	Romania
Penalties
Sheedy (penalty scored); Houghton (penalty scored); Townsend (penalty scored); Cascarino (penalty scored); O'Leary (penalty scored)	5–4	(penalty scored) Hagi; (penalty scored) Lupu; (penalty scored) Rotariu; (penalty scored) Lupescu; (penalty missed) Timofte

Stadio Luigi Ferraris, Genoa
Attendance: 31,818
Referee: José Roberto Wright (Brazil)

Republic of Ireland	Romania

GK	1	Packie Bonner
CB	4	Mick McCarthy (c)
CB	7	Paul McGrath	(yellow card) 108'
CB	5	Kevin Moran
RWB	2	Chris Morris
LWB	3	Steve Staunton		(substituted off) 94'
CM	8	Ray Houghton
CM	13	Andy Townsend
AM	11	Kevin Sheedy
CF	9	John Aldridge	(yellow card) 21'	(substituted off) 22'
CF	17	Niall Quinn
Substitutes:
GK	22	Gerry Peyton
DF	6	Ronnie Whelan
FW	10	Tony Cascarino		(substituted on) 22'
DF	12	David O'Leary		(substituted on) 94'
MF	16	John Sheridan
Manager:
(England) Jack Charlton

GK	1	Silviu Lung (c)
SW	6	Gheorghe Popescu
DF	4	Ioan Andone
DF	21	Ioan Lupescu
MF	2	Mircea Rednic
MF	8	Ioan Sabău		(substituted off) 98'
MF	10	Gheorghe Hagi	(yellow card) 111'
MF	5	Iosif Rotariu
MF	3	Michael Klein
FW	18	Gavril Balint
FW	14	Florin Răducioiu		(substituted off) 74'
Substitutes:
GK	12	Bogdan Stelea
FW	9	Rodion Cămătaru
MF	11	Dănuț Lupu	(yellow card) 114'	(substituted on) 74'
MF	16	Daniel Timofte		(substituted on) 98'
DF	19	Emil Săndoi
Manager:
Emerich Jenei

Assistant referees:
Carlos Maciel (Paraguay)
Jassim Mandi (Bahrain)

=== Italy vs Uruguay ===
25 June 1990
21:00

Italy	2–0	Uruguay
Schillaci 65'; Serena 83'

Stadio Olimpico, Rome
Attendance: 73,303
Referee: George Courtney (England)

Italy	Uruguay

GK	1	Walter Zenga
SW	2	Franco Baresi
DF	3	Giuseppe Bergomi (c)
DF	6	Riccardo Ferri
MF	4	Luigi De Agostini
MF	10	Nicola Berti	(yellow card) 36'	(substituted off) 52'
MF	11	Fernando De Napoli
MF	13	Giuseppe Giannini
MF	7	Paolo Maldini
FW	15	Roberto Baggio		(substituted off) 79'
FW	19	Salvatore Schillaci
Substitutes:
GK	12	Stefano Tacconi
DF	8	Pietro Vierchowod		(substituted on) 79'
MF	9	Carlo Ancelotti
MF	20	Aldo Serena		(substituted on) 52'
FW	21	Gianluca Vialli
Manager:
Azeglio Vicini

GK	1	Fernando Álvez	(yellow card) 26'
DF	2	Nelson Gutiérrez	(yellow card) 62'
DF	3	Hugo de León
DF	6	Alfonso Domínguez
DF	14	José Pintos Saldanha	(yellow card) 14'
MF	20	Ruben Pereira
MF	9	Enzo Francescoli (c)
MF	8	Santiago Ostolaza		(substituted off) 79'
MF	5	José Perdomo	(yellow card) 35'
FW	19	Daniel Fonseca
FW	18	Carlos Aguilera		(substituted off) 55'
Substitutes:
GK	22	Javier Zeoli
MF	7	Antonio Alzamendi		(substituted on) 79'
FW	11	Rubén Sosa		(substituted on) 55'
DF	13	Daniel Revelez
MF	16	Pablo Bengoechea
Manager:
Óscar Tabárez

Assistant referees:
Kurt Röthlisberger (Switzerland)
Zoran Petrović (Yugoslavia)

=== Spain vs Yugoslavia ===
26 June 1990
17:00

Spain	1–2 (a.e.t.)	Yugoslavia
Salinas 84'		Stojković 78', 93'

Stadio Marc'Antonio Bentegodi, Verona
Attendance: 35,500
Referee: Aron Schmidhuber (West Germany)

Spain	Yugoslavia

GK	1	Andoni Zubizarreta
SW	4	Genar Andrinúa		(substituted off) 49'
RB	2	Chendo	(yellow card) 110'
CB	14	Alberto Górriz
LB	5	Manuel Sanchís
RM	6	Rafael Martín Vázquez
CM	21	Míchel
CM	15	Roberto	(yellow card) 92'
LM	11	Francisco Villarroya
RF	9	Emilio Butragueño (c)		(substituted off) 79'
LF	19	Julio Salinas
Substitutions:
GK	13	Juan Carlos Ablanedo
DF	3	Manuel Jiménez		(substituted on) 49'
FW	7	Miguel Pardeza
DF	12	Rafael Alkorta
MF	18	Rafael Paz		(substituted on) 79'
Manager:
Luis Suárez

GK	1	Tomislav Ivković
SW	5	Faruk Hadžibegić
DF	16	Refik Šabanadžović
DF	3	Predrag Spasić
MF	10	Dragan Stojković
MF	13	Srečko Katanec	(yellow card) 7'	(substituted off) 79'
MF	6	Davor Jozić
MF	8	Safet Sušić
MF	7	Dragoljub Brnović
FW	9	Darko Pančev		(substituted off) 55'
FW	11	Zlatko Vujović (c)	(yellow card) 60'
Substitutions:
GK	12	Fahrudin Omerović
DF	4	Zoran Vulić	(yellow card) 97'	(substituted on) 79'
MF	15	Robert Prosinečki
MF	17	Robert Jarni
MF	19	Dejan Savićević		(substituted on) 55'
Manager:
Ivica Osim

Assistant referees:
Alan Snoddy (Northern Ireland)
Michał Listkiewicz (Poland)

=== England vs Belgium ===
26 June 1990
21:00

England	1–0 (a.e.t.)	Belgium
Platt 119'

Stadio Renato Dall'Ara, Bologna
Attendance: 34,520
Referee: Peter Mikkelsen (Denmark)

England	Belgium

GK	1	Peter Shilton
SW	14	Mark Wright
RB	12	Paul Parker
CB	5	Des Walker
CB	6	Terry Butcher (c)
LB	3	Stuart Pearce
RM	8	Chris Waddle
CM	16	Steve McMahon		(substituted off) 71'
CM	19	Paul Gascoigne	(yellow card) 85'
LM	11	John Barnes		(substituted off) 74'
FW	10	Gary Lineker
Substitutions:
GK	13	Chris Woods
FW	9	Peter Beardsley
MF	17	David Platt		(substituted on) 71'
CM	20	Trevor Steven
FW	21	Steve Bull		(substituted on) 74'
Manager:
Bobby Robson

GK	1	Michel Preud'homme
RB	2	Eric Gerets
SW	7	Stéphane Demol
CB	13	Georges Grün
LB	16	Michel De Wolf
RM	4	Lei Clijsters
CM	8	Franky Van der Elst
CM	10	Enzo Scifo
LM	5	Bruno Versavel	(substituted off) 107'
FW	9	Marc Degryse	(substituted off) 64'
FW	11	Jan Ceulemans (c)
Substitutes:
GK	20	Filip De Wilde
DF	3	Philippe Albert
FW	14	Nico Claesen	(substituted on) 64'
FW	19	Marc Van Der Linden
MF	22	Patrick Vervoort	(substituted on) 107'
Manager:
Guy Thys

Assistant referees:
Helmut Kohl (Austria)
Shizuo Takada (Japan)

== Quarter-finals ==
=== Argentina vs Yugoslavia ===
30 June 1990
17:00

Argentina	0–0 (a.e.t.)	Yugoslavia
Penalties
Serrizuela (penalty scored); Burruchaga (penalty scored); Maradona (penalty missed); Troglio (penalty missed); Dezotti (penalty scored)	3–2	(penalty missed) Stojković; (penalty scored) Prosinečki; (penalty scored) Savićević; (penalty missed) Brnović; (penalty missed) Hadžibegić

Stadio Comunale, Florence
Attendance: 38,971
Referee: Kurt Röthlisberger (Switzerland)

Argentina	Yugoslavia

GK	12	Sergio Goycochea
DF	19	Oscar Ruggeri
SW	20	Juan Simón	(yellow card) 111'
DF	18	José Serrizuela	(yellow card) 21'
MF	4	José Basualdo
MF	14	Ricardo Giusti
MF	16	Julio Olarticoechea	(yellow card) 41'	(substituted off) 51'
MF	7	Jorge Burruchaga
MF	6	Gabriel Calderón		(substituted off) 87'
FW	8	Claudio Caniggia
FW	10	Diego Maradona (c)
Substitutions:
GK	22	Fabián Cancelarich
MF	2	Sergio Batista
FW	9	Gustavo Dezotti		(substituted on) 87'
DF	13	Néstor Lorenzo
MF	21	Pedro Troglio	(yellow card) 61'	(substituted on) 51'
Manager:
Carlos Bilardo

GK	1	Tomislav Ivković
SW	5	Faruk Hadžibegić
DF	4	Zoran Vulić
DF	16	Refik Šabanadžović	(yellow card) 24' (yellow-red card) 31'
DF	3	Predrag Spasić
MF	15	Robert Prosinečki
MF	10	Dragan Stojković
MF	8	Safet Sušić		(substituted off) 61'
MF	6	Davor Jozić
MF	7	Dragoljub Brnović
FW	11	Zlatko Vujović (c)
Substitutions:
GK	12	Fahrudin Omerović
FW	9	Darko Pančev
MF	17	Robert Jarni
DF	18	Mirsad Baljić
MF	19	Dejan Savićević		(substituted on) 61'
Manager:
Ivica Osim

Assistant referees:
Neji Jouini (Tunisia)
Mohamed Hansal (Algeria)

=== Republic of Ireland vs Italy ===
30 June 1990
21:00

Republic of Ireland	0–1	Italy
		Schillaci 38'

Stadio Olimpico, Rome
Attendance: 73,303
Referee: Carlos Silva Valente (Portugal)

Republic of Ireland	Italy

GK	1	Packie Bonner
RB	2	Chris Morris
CB	4	Mick McCarthy (c)
CB	5	Kevin Moran	(yellow card) 43'
LB	3	Steve Staunton
RM	8	Ray Houghton
CM	7	Paul McGrath
CM	13	Andy Townsend
LM	11	Kevin Sheedy
CF	9	John Aldridge		(substituted off) 78'
CF	17	Niall Quinn		(substituted off) 53'
Substitutions:
GK	22	Gerry Peyton
DF	6	Ronnie Whelan
FW	10	Tony Cascarino		(substituted on) 53'
DF	12	David O'Leary
MF	16	John Sheridan		(substituted on) 78'
Manager:
(England) Jack Charlton

GK	1	Walter Zenga
SW	2	Franco Baresi
DF	3	Giuseppe Bergomi (c)
DF	6	Riccardo Ferri
MF	17	Roberto Donadoni
MF	11	Fernando De Napoli
MF	13	Giuseppe Giannini		(substituted off) 62'
MF	4	Luigi De Agostini	(yellow card) 36'
MF	7	Paolo Maldini
FW	15	Roberto Baggio		(substituted off) 70'
FW	19	Salvatore Schillaci
Substitutes:
GK	12	Stefano Tacconi
DF	8	Pietro Vierchowod
MF	9	Carlo Ancelotti		(substituted on) 62'
MF	20	Aldo Serena		(substituted on) 70'
FW	21	Gianluca Vialli
Manager:
Azeglio Vicini

Assistant referees:
Armando Pérez Hoyos (Colombia)
Berny Ulloa Morera (Costa Rica)

=== Czechoslovakia vs West Germany ===
1 July 1990
17:00

Czechoslovakia	0–1	West Germany
		Matthäus 25' (pen.)

San Siro, Milan
Attendance: 73,347
Referee: Helmut Kohl (Austria)

Czechoslovakia	West Germany

GK	1	Jan Stejskal
DF	5	Ján Kocian
DF	3	Miroslav Kadlec
DF	9	Luboš Kubík		(substituted off) 79'
DF	6	František Straka	(yellow card) 38'
MF	4	Ivan Hašek (c)
MF	11	Ľubomír Moravčík	(yellow card) 11' (yellow-red card) 70'
MF	8	Jozef Chovanec
MF	7	Michal Bílek	(yellow card) 14'	(substituted off) 67'
FW	10	Tomáš Skuhravý
FW	17	Ivo Knoflíček	(yellow card) 88'
Substitutions:
GK	21	Luděk Mikloško
MF	14	Vladimír Weiss
MF	18	Milan Luhový
FW	19	Stanislav Griga		(substituted on) 79'
MF	20	Václav Němeček		(substituted on) 67'
Manager:
Jozef Vengloš

GK	1	Bodo Illgner
SW	5	Klaus Augenthaler
DF	3	Andreas Brehme
DF	6	Guido Buchwald
DF	4	Jürgen Kohler
DF	14	Thomas Berthold
MF	7	Pierre Littbarski
MF	10	Lothar Matthäus (c)
MF	15	Uwe Bein		(substituted off) 82'
FW	13	Karl-Heinz Riedle
FW	18	Jürgen Klinsmann	(yellow card) 28'
Substitutions:
GK	12	Raimond Aumann
DF	2	Stefan Reuter
FW	11	Frank Mill
MF	17	Andreas Möller		(substituted on) 82'
MF	20	Olaf Thon
Manager:
Franz Beckenbauer

Assistant referees:
Peter Mikkelsen (Denmark)
Michał Listkiewicz (Poland)

=== Cameroon vs England ===
Apart from anything else, it was the only quarter-final to produce more than one goal. Despite Cameroon's heroics earlier in the tournament, David Platt put England ahead in the 25th minute. At half-time, Cameroon brought Milla on, and the game was turned on its head in five second-half minutes. First Cameroon were awarded a penalty, from which Emmanuel Kunde scored the equaliser. Then, in the 65th minute, Eugene Ekeke put Cameroon ahead. The African team came within eight minutes of reaching the semi-finals, but then they conceded a penalty, which Gary Lineker gratefully converted. Midway through extra time, England were awarded another penalty, which Lineker again scored from the spot. England were through to the semi-finals for the first time in 24 years.

Yet England had grossly underestimated Cameroon's threat, despite the Indomitable Lions defeating then World Champions Argentina in the tournament's opening game and easily seeing off a highly fancied Colombia in the Round of 16. Howard Wilkinson was observing Cameroon's progress for England and informed the players that this quarter-final match represented "A practical bye to the semi-finals". Chris Waddle, emerging afterwards, was reported to have told Wilkinson: "Some fucking bye that". England would not face African opposition in the knockout stage of a World Cup again until 2022's Round of 16 encounter with Senegal.

1 July 1990
21:00

Cameroon	2–3 (a.e.t.)	England
Kundé 61' (pen.); Ekéké 65'		Platt 25'; Lineker 83' (pen.), 105' (pen.)

Stadio San Paolo, Naples
Attendance: 55,205
Referee: Edgardo Codesal (Mexico)

Cameroon	England

GK	16	Thomas N'Kono	(yellow card) 104'
SW	6	Emmanuel Kundé
DF	14	Stephen Tataw (c)
DF	4	Benjamin Massing	(yellow card) 28'
DF	5	Bertin Ebwellé
MF	15	Thomas Libiih
MF	21	Emmanuel Maboang		(substituted off) 46'
MF	13	Jean-Claude Pagal
MF	10	Louis-Paul Mfédé		(substituted off) 62'
FW	7	François Omam-Biyik
FW	20	Cyril Makanaky
Substitutes:
GK	22	Jacques Songo'o
FW	9	Roger Milla	(yellow card) 120'	(substituted on) 46'
FW	11	Eugène Ekéké		(substituted on) 62'
DF	12	Alphonse Yombi
MF	19	Roger Feutmba
Manager:
(Soviet Union) Valery Nepomnyashchy

GK	1	Peter Shilton
SW	14	Mark Wright
RB	12	Paul Parker
CB	5	Des Walker
CB	6	Terry Butcher (c)		(substituted off) 73'
LB	3	Stuart Pearce	(yellow card) 70'
RW	8	Chris Waddle
CM	17	David Platt
CM	19	Paul Gascoigne
LW	11	John Barnes		(substituted off) 46'
FW	10	Gary Lineker
Substitutes:
GK	13	Chris Woods
FW	9	Peter Beardsley		(substituted on) 46'
MF	16	Steve McMahon
MF	20	Trevor Steven		(substituted on) 73'
FW	21	Steve Bull
Manager:
Bobby Robson

Assistant referees:
Vincent Mauro (United States)
Jassim Mandi (Bahrain)

== Semi-finals ==
=== Argentina vs Italy ===
3 July 1990
20:00

Argentina	1–1 (a.e.t.)	Italy
Caniggia 67'		Schillaci 17'
Penalties
Serrizuela (penalty scored); Burruchaga (penalty scored); Olarticoechea (penalty scored); Maradona (penalty scored)	4–3	(penalty scored) Baresi; (penalty scored) Baggio; (penalty scored) De Agostini; (penalty missed) Donadoni; (penalty missed) Serena

Stadio San Paolo, Naples
Attendance: 59,978
Referee: Michel Vautrot (France)

Argentina	Italy

GK	12	Sergio Goycochea
DF	19	Oscar Ruggeri	(yellow card) 71'
SW	20	Juan Simón
DF	18	José Serrizuela
MF	4	José Basualdo		(substituted off) 99'
MF	14	Ricardo Giusti	(yellow card) 30' (yellow-red card) 103'
MF	16	Julio Olarticoechea	(yellow card) 76'
MF	7	Jorge Burruchaga
MF	6	Gabriel Calderón		(substituted off) 46'
FW	8	Claudio Caniggia	(yellow card) 82'
FW	10	Diego Maradona (c)
Substitutes:
GK	22	Fabián Cancelarich
MF	2	Sergio Batista	(yellow card) 118'	(substituted on) 99'
FW	9	Gustavo Dezotti
DF	15	Pedro Monzón
MF	21	Pedro Troglio		(substituted on) 46'
Manager:
Carlos Bilardo

GK	1	Walter Zenga
SW	2	Franco Baresi
DF	3	Giuseppe Bergomi (c)
DF	6	Riccardo Ferri
MF	17	Roberto Donadoni
MF	11	Fernando De Napoli
MF	13	Giuseppe Giannini	(yellow card) 22'	(substituted off) 73'
MF	4	Luigi De Agostini
MF	7	Paolo Maldini
FW	21	Gianluca Vialli		(substituted off) 70'
FW	19	Salvatore Schillaci
Substitutes:
GK	12	Stefano Tacconi
DF	8	Pietro Vierchowod
MF	9	Carlo Ancelotti
FW	15	Roberto Baggio		(substituted on) 73'
MF	20	Aldo Serena		(substituted on) 70'
Manager:
Azeglio Vicini

Assistant referees:
Michał Listkiewicz (Poland)
Peter Mikkelsen (Denmark)

=== West Germany vs England ===
4 July 1990
20:00

West Germany	1–1 (a.e.t.)	England
Brehme 60'		Lineker 80'
Penalties
Brehme (penalty scored); Matthäus (penalty scored); Riedle (penalty scored); Thon (penalty scored)	4–3	(penalty scored) Lineker; (penalty scored) Beardsley; (penalty scored) Platt; (penalty missed) Pearce; (penalty missed) Waddle

Stadio delle Alpi, Turin
Attendance: 62,628
Referee: José Roberto Wright (Brazil)

West Germany	England

GK	1	Bodo Illgner
SW	5	Klaus Augenthaler
RWB	14	Thomas Berthold
DF	6	Guido Buchwald
DF	4	Jürgen Kohler
LWB	3	Andreas Brehme	(yellow card) 109'
MF	8	Thomas Häßler		(substituted off) 66'
MF	10	Lothar Matthäus (c)
MF	20	Olaf Thon
FW	9	Rudi Völler		(substituted off) 38'
FW	18	Jürgen Klinsmann
Substitutes:
GK	12	Raimond Aumann
DF	2	Stefan Reuter		(substituted on) 66'
FW	13	Karl-Heinz Riedle		(substituted on) 38'
DF	16	Paul Steiner
MF	17	Andreas Möller
Manager:
Franz Beckenbauer

GK	1	Peter Shilton
SW	14	Mark Wright
RB	12	Paul Parker	(yellow card) 66'
CB	5	Des Walker
CB	6	Terry Butcher (c)		(substituted off) 70'
LB	3	Stuart Pearce
RM	8	Chris Waddle
CM	17	David Platt
CM	19	Paul Gascoigne	(yellow card) 99'
LM	9	Peter Beardsley
FW	10	Gary Lineker
Substitutes:
GK	13	Chris Woods
DF	15	Tony Dorigo
MF	16	Steve McMahon
MF	20	Trevor Steven		(substituted on) 70'
FW	21	Steve Bull
Manager:
Bobby Robson

Assistant referees:
Joël Quiniou (France)
Armando Pérez Hoyos (Colombia)

== Match for third place ==
7 July 1990
20:00

Italy	2–1	England
Baggio 71'; Schillaci 86' (pen.)		Platt 81'

Stadio San Nicola, Bari
Attendance: 51,426
Referee: Joël Quiniou (France)

Italy	England

GK	1	Walter Zenga
SW	2	Franco Baresi
DF	3	Giuseppe Bergomi (c)
DF	5	Ciro Ferrara
DF	8	Pietro Vierchowod
DF	7	Paolo Maldini
MF	13	Giuseppe Giannini	(substituted off) 90'
MF	9	Carlo Ancelotti
MF	4	Luigi De Agostini	(substituted off) 67'
FW	15	Roberto Baggio
FW	19	Salvatore Schillaci
Substitutes:
GK	12	Stefano Tacconi
DF	6	Riccardo Ferri	(substituted on) 90'
MF	10	Nicola Berti	(substituted on) 67'
MF	20	Aldo Serena
FW	21	Gianluca Vialli
Manager:
Azeglio Vicini

GK	1	Peter Shilton (c)
SW	14	Mark Wright	(substituted off) 71'
RB	2	Gary Stevens
CB	12	Paul Parker
CB	5	Des Walker
LB	15	Tony Dorigo
CM	20	Trevor Steven
CM	16	Steve McMahon	(substituted off) 71'
CM	17	David Platt
FW	9	Peter Beardsley
FW	10	Gary Lineker
Substitutes:
GK	13	Chris Woods
DF	3	Stuart Pearce
MF	4	Neil Webb	(substituted on) 71'
MF	8	Chris Waddle	(substituted on) 71'
FW	21	Steve Bull
Manager:
Bobby Robson

Assistant referees:
Mohamed Hansal (Algeria)
Kurt Röthlisberger (Switzerland)

== Final ==
8 July 1990
20:00 UTC+2

West Germany	1–0	Argentina
Brehme 85' (pen.)

Stadio Olimpico, Rome
Attendance: 73,603
Referee: Edgardo Codesal (Mexico)

West Germany	Argentina

GK	1	Bodo Illgner
SW	5	Klaus Augenthaler
CB	6	Guido Buchwald
CB	4	Jürgen Kohler
RWB	14	Thomas Berthold		(substituted off) 73'
LWB	3	Andreas Brehme
CM	8	Thomas Häßler
CM	10	Lothar Matthäus (c)
CM	7	Pierre Littbarski
CF	9	Rudi Völler	(yellow card) 52'
CF	18	Jürgen Klinsmann
Substitutes:
GK	12	Raimond Aumann
DF	2	Stefan Reuter		(substituted on) 73'
FW	13	Karl-Heinz Riedle
MF	15	Uwe Bein
MF	20	Olaf Thon
Manager:
Franz Beckenbauer

GK	12	Sergio Goycochea
SW	20	Juan Simón
CB	18	José Serrizuela
CB	19	Oscar Ruggeri		(substituted off) 46'
RWB	4	José Basualdo
LWB	17	Roberto Sensini
DM	13	Néstor Lorenzo
CM	7	Jorge Burruchaga		(substituted off) 53'
CM	21	Pedro Troglio	(yellow card) 84'
SS	10	Diego Maradona (c)	(yellow card) 87'
CF	9	Gustavo Dezotti	(yellow card) 5' (red card) 87'
Substitutes:
GK	22	Fabián Cancelarich
FW	3	Abel Balbo
DF	5	Edgardo Bauza
MF	6	Gabriel Calderón		(substituted on) 53'
DF	15	Pedro Monzón	(red card) 65'	(substituted on) 46'
Manager:
Carlos Bilardo

Linesmen:
Armando Pérez Hoyos (Colombia)
Michał Listkiewicz (Poland)
