= 1990 FIFA World Cup squads =

This article lists the national football team squads for the 1990 FIFA World Cup final tournament held in Italy, between 8 June and 8 July 1990. Each country's final squad consisted of 22 players and had to be confirmed by 29 May.

Replacement of injured players was permitted during the tournament at the discretion of FIFA. Two goalkeepers (for Argentina and England) were allowed to replace their injured counterparts under this ruling. Players marked (c) were named as captain for their national squad. Number of caps counts until the start of the World Cup, including all pre-tournament friendlies. A player's age is also at the start of the tournament. A flag is included for coaches who are of a different nationality to their team.

== Group A ==
=== Austria ===
Head coach: Josef Hickersberger

No.	Pos.	Player	Date of birth (age)	Caps	Club
1	GK	Klaus Lindenberger	28 May 1957 (aged 33)	37	(Austria) Swarovski Tirol
2	DF	Ernst Aigner	31 October 1966 (aged 23)	7	Austria Vienna
3	DF	Robert Pecl	15 November 1965 (aged 24)	19	(Austria) Rapid Vienna
4	DF	Anton Pfeffer	17 August 1965 (aged 24)	21	Austria Vienna
5	DF	Peter Schöttel	26 March 1967 (aged 23)	11	(Austria) Rapid Vienna
6	MF	Manfred Zsak	22 December 1964 (aged 25)	28	Austria Vienna
7	DF	Kurt Russ	23 November 1964 (aged 25)	20	(Austria) First Vienna FC
8	DF	Peter Artner	20 May 1966 (aged 24)	21	(Austria) Admira Wacker
9	FW	Toni Polster (captain)	10 March 1964 (aged 26)	36	(Spain) Sevilla
10	MF	Manfred Linzmaier	27 August 1962 (aged 27)	19	(Austria) Swarovski Tirol
11	MF	Alfred Hörtnagl	24 September 1966 (aged 23)	10	(Austria) Swarovski Tirol
12	MF	Michael Baur	16 April 1969 (aged 21)	1	(Austria) Swarovski Tirol
13	FW	Andreas Ogris	7 October 1964 (aged 25)	28	Austria Vienna
14	FW	Gerhard Rodax	29 August 1965 (aged 24)	16	(Austria) Admira Wacker
15	FW	Christian Keglevits	29 January 1961 (aged 29)	15	(Austria) Rapid Vienna
16	MF	Andreas Reisinger	14 October 1963 (aged 26)	6	(Austria) Rapid Vienna
17	FW	Heimo Pfeifenberger	29 December 1966 (aged 23)	3	(Austria) Rapid Vienna
18	DF	Michael Streiter	19 January 1966 (aged 24)	8	(Austria) Swarovski Tirol
19	MF	Gerald Glatzmayer	14 December 1968 (aged 21)	5	(Austria) First Vienna FC
20	MF	Andi Herzog	10 September 1968 (aged 21)	16	(Austria) Rapid Vienna
21	GK	Michael Konsel	6 March 1962 (aged 28)	5	(Austria) Rapid Vienna
22	GK	Otto Konrad	1 November 1964 (aged 25)	2	(Austria) Sturm Graz

=== Czechoslovakia ===
Head coach: Jozef Vengloš

No.	Pos.	Player	Date of birth (age)	Caps	Club
1	GK	Jan Stejskal	15 January 1962 (aged 28)	16	(Czechoslovakia) Sparta Prague
2	DF	Július Bielik	8 March 1962 (aged 28)	16	(Czechoslovakia) Sparta Prague
3	DF	Miroslav Kadlec	22 June 1964 (aged 25)	20	(Czechoslovakia) TJ Vítkovice
4	MF	Ivan Hašek (captain)	6 September 1963 (aged 26)	42	(Czechoslovakia) Sparta Prague
5	DF	Ján Kocian	13 March 1958 (aged 32)	13	(West Germany) FC St. Pauli
6	DF	František Straka	21 May 1958 (aged 32)	32	(West Germany) Borussia Mönchengladbach
7	MF	Michal Bílek	13 April 1965 (aged 25)	20	(Czechoslovakia) Sparta Prague
8	MF	Jozef Chovanec	7 March 1960 (aged 30)	42	(Netherlands) PSV
9	DF	Luboš Kubík	20 January 1964 (aged 26)	21	(Italy) Fiorentina
10	FW	Tomáš Skuhravý	7 September 1965 (aged 24)	22	(Czechoslovakia) Sparta Prague
11	MF	Ľubomír Moravčík	22 June 1965 (aged 24)	16	(Czechoslovakia) Plastika Nitra
12	DF	Peter Fieber	16 May 1964 (aged 26)	3	(Czechoslovakia) Dunajská Streda
13	MF	Jiří Němec	15 May 1966 (aged 24)	1	(Czechoslovakia) Dukla Prague
14	MF	Vladimír Weiss	22 September 1964 (aged 25)	15	(Czechoslovakia) Inter Bratislava
15	DF	Vladimír Kinier	6 April 1958 (aged 32)	9	(Czechoslovakia) Slovan Bratislava
16	FW	Viliam Hýravý	26 November 1962 (aged 27)	10	(Czechoslovakia) Baník Ostrava
17	FW	Ivo Knoflíček	23 February 1962 (aged 28)	28	(West Germany) FC St. Pauli
18	FW	Milan Luhový	1 January 1963 (aged 27)	28	(Spain) Sporting Gijón
19	FW	Stanislav Griga	4 November 1961 (aged 28)	32	(Netherlands) Feyenoord
20	MF	Václav Němeček	25 January 1967 (aged 23)	17	(Czechoslovakia) Sparta Prague
21	GK	Luděk Mikloško	9 December 1961 (aged 28)	32	(England) West Ham United
22	GK	Peter Palúch	17 February 1958 (aged 32)	0	(Czechoslovakia) Plastika Nitra

=== Italy ===
Head coach: Azeglio Vicini

No.	Pos.	Player	Date of birth (age)	Caps	Club
1	GK	Walter Zenga	28 April 1960 (aged 30)	35	(Italy) Internazionale
2	DF	Franco Baresi	8 May 1960 (aged 30)	39	(Italy) Milan
3	DF	Giuseppe Bergomi (captain)	22 December 1963 (aged 26)	65	(Italy) Internazionale
4	DF	Luigi De Agostini	7 April 1961 (aged 29)	24	(Italy) Juventus
5	DF	Ciro Ferrara	11 February 1967 (aged 23)	16	(Italy) Napoli
6	DF	Riccardo Ferri	20 August 1963 (aged 26)	29	(Italy) Internazionale
7	DF	Paolo Maldini	26 June 1968 (aged 21)	19	(Italy) Milan
8	DF	Pietro Vierchowod	6 April 1959 (aged 31)	29	(Italy) Sampdoria
9	MF	Carlo Ancelotti	10 June 1959 (aged 30)	22	(Italy) Milan
10	MF	Nicola Berti	14 April 1967 (aged 23)	11	(Italy) Internazionale
11	MF	Fernando De Napoli	15 March 1964 (aged 26)	38	(Italy) Napoli
12	GK	Stefano Tacconi	13 May 1957 (aged 33)	5	(Italy) Juventus
13	MF	Giuseppe Giannini	20 August 1964 (aged 25)	34	(Italy) Roma
14	MF	Giancarlo Marocchi	4 July 1965 (aged 24)	7	(Italy) Juventus
15	FW	Roberto Baggio	18 February 1967 (aged 23)	8	(Italy) Fiorentina
16	FW	Andrea Carnevale	12 January 1961 (aged 29)	8	(Italy) Napoli
17	MF	Roberto Donadoni	9 September 1963 (aged 26)	29	(Italy) Milan
18	FW	Roberto Mancini	27 November 1964 (aged 25)	20	(Italy) Sampdoria
19	FW	Salvatore Schillaci	1 December 1964 (aged 25)	1	(Italy) Juventus
20	FW	Aldo Serena	25 June 1960 (aged 29)	18	(Italy) Internazionale
21	FW	Gianluca Vialli	9 July 1964 (aged 25)	42	(Italy) Sampdoria
22	GK	Gianluca Pagliuca	18 December 1966 (aged 23)	0	(Italy) Sampdoria

Note: with the exception of the goalkeepers, who were assigned the traditional shirt numbers for the role (1, 12 and 22) the Italian team was numbered alphabetically within their respective positions: Defenders (from 2 to 8), Midfielders (from 9 to 14) and Forwards (from 15 to 21).

=== United States ===
Head coach: Bob Gansler

No.	Pos.	Player	Date of birth (age)	Caps	Club
1	GK	Tony Meola	21 February 1969 (aged 21)	17	(United States) Virginia Cavaliers
2	DF	Steve Trittschuh	24 April 1965 (aged 25)	29	(United States) Tampa Bay Rowdies
3	DF	John Doyle	16 March 1966 (aged 24)	21	(United States) S.F. Bay Blackhawks
4	DF	Jimmy Banks	2 September 1964 (aged 25)	26	(United States) Milwaukee Wave
5	DF	Mike Windischmann (captain)	6 December 1965 (aged 24)	42	(United States) Albany Capitals
6	MF	John Harkes	8 March 1967 (aged 23)	28	(United States) Albany Capitals
7	MF	Tab Ramos	21 September 1966 (aged 23)	23	(Spain) Figueres
8	DF	Brian Bliss	28 September 1965 (aged 24)	23	(United States) Albany Capitals
9	FW	Christopher Sullivan	18 April 1965 (aged 25)	15	(Hungary) Győri
10	FW	Peter Vermes	21 November 1966 (aged 23)	20	(Netherlands) Volendam
11	FW	Eric Wynalda	9 June 1969 (aged 20)	13	(United States) S.F. Bay Blackhawks
12	DF	Paul Krumpe	4 March 1963 (aged 27)	16	(United States) Real Santa Barbara
13	FW	Eric Eichmann	7 May 1965 (aged 25)	21	(United States) Fort Lauderdale Strikers
14	MF	John Stollmeyer	25 October 1962 (aged 27)	28	(United States) Washington Stars
15	DF	Desmond Armstrong	2 November 1964 (aged 25)	14	(United States) Baltimore Blast
16	FW	Bruce Murray	25 January 1966 (aged 24)	38	(United States) Washington Stars
17	DF	Marcelo Balboa	8 August 1967 (aged 22)	18	(United States) San Diego Nomads
18	GK	Kasey Keller	29 November 1969 (aged 20)	6	(United States) Portland Timbers
19	MF	Chris Henderson	11 December 1970 (aged 19)	5	(United States) UCLA Bruins
20	MF	Paul Caligiuri	9 March 1964 (aged 26)	33	(West Germany) SV Meppen
21	MF	Neil Covone	31 August 1969 (aged 20)	5	(United States) Wake Forest Demon Deacons
22	GK	David Vanole	6 February 1963 (aged 27)	13	(United States) Los Angeles Heat

== Group B ==
=== Argentina ===
Head coach: Carlos Bilardo

No.	Pos.	Player	Date of birth (age)	Caps	Club
1	GK	Nery Pumpido*	30 July 1957 (aged 32)	34	(Spain) Real Betis
2	MF	Sergio Batista	9 November 1962 (aged 27)	30	(Argentina) River Plate
3	FW	Abel Balbo	1 June 1966 (aged 24)	6	(Italy) Udinese
4	MF	José Basualdo	20 June 1963 (aged 26)	10	(West Germany) VfB Stuttgart
5	DF	Edgardo Bauza	26 January 1958 (aged 32)	1	(Mexico) Veracruz
6	FW	Gabriel Calderón	7 February 1960 (aged 30)	16	(France) Paris Saint-Germain
7	MF	Jorge Burruchaga	9 October 1962 (aged 27)	52	(France) Nantes
8	FW	Claudio Caniggia	9 January 1967 (aged 23)	16	(Italy) Atalanta
9	FW	Gustavo Dezotti	14 February 1964 (aged 26)	1	(Italy) Cremonese
10	MF	Diego Maradona (captain)	30 October 1960 (aged 29)	73	(Italy) Napoli
11	DF	Néstor Fabbri	29 April 1968 (aged 22)	7	(Argentina) Racing Club
12	GK	Sergio Goycochea	17 October 1963 (aged 26)	1	(Colombia) Millonarios
13	DF	Néstor Lorenzo	28 February 1966 (aged 24)	12	(Italy) Bari
14	MF	Ricardo Giusti	11 December 1956 (aged 33)	47	(Argentina) Independiente
15	DF	Pedro Monzón	23 February 1962 (aged 28)	10	(Argentina) Independiente
16	DF	Julio Olarticoechea	18 October 1958 (aged 31)	19	(Argentina) Racing Club
17	DF	Roberto Sensini	12 October 1966 (aged 23)	16	(Italy) Udinese
18	DF	José Serrizuela	16 June 1962 (aged 27)	1	(Argentina) River Plate
19	DF	Oscar Ruggeri	26 January 1962 (aged 28)	50	(Spain) Real Madrid
20	DF	Juan Simón	2 March 1960 (aged 30)	3	(Argentina) Boca Juniors
21	MF	Pedro Troglio	28 July 1965 (aged 24)	12	(Italy) Lazio
22	GK	Fabián Cancelarich	20 December 1965 (aged 24)	0	(Argentina) Ferro Carril Oeste

No.	Pos.	Player	Date of birth (age)	Caps	Club
1	GK	Ángel Comizzo	27 April 1962 (aged 28)	0	(Argentina) River Plate

*Following a rupture of goalkeeper Pumpido's tibia and fibula, the Argentine team was authorized to replace him with Comizzo, who joined the team as third goalkeeper.

=== Cameroon ===
Head coach: (Soviet Union) Valery Nepomnyashchy

No.	Pos.	Player	Date of birth (age)	Caps	Club
1	GK	Joseph-Antoine Bell	8 October 1954 (aged 35)	31	(France) Bordeaux
2	DF	André Kana-Biyik	1 September 1965 (aged 24)	41	(France) Metz
3	MF	Jules Onana	12 June 1964 (aged 25)	6	(Cameroon) Canon Yaoundé
4	DF	Benjamin Massing	20 June 1962 (aged 27)	0	(France) Créteil
5	DF	Bertin Ebwellé	11 September 1962 (aged 27)	16	(Cameroon) Tonnerre Yaoundé
6	DF	Emmanuel Kundé	15 July 1956 (aged 33)	82	(Cameroon) Prévoyance Yaoundé
7	FW	François Omam-Biyik	21 May 1966 (aged 24)	34	(France) Stade Lavallois
8	MF	Émile Mbouh	30 May 1966 (aged 24)	38	(Switzerland) Chênois
9	FW	Roger Milla	20 May 1952 (aged 38)	56	(Réunion) JS Saint-Pierroise
10	MF	Louis-Paul M'Fédé	26 February 1961 (aged 29)	40	(Cameroon) Canon Yaoundé
11	FW	Eugène Ekéké	30 May 1960 (aged 30)	2	(France) Valenciennes
12	DF	Alphonse Yombi	30 June 1969 (aged 20)	?	(Cameroon) Canon Yaoundé
13	DF	Jean-Claude Pagal	15 September 1964 (aged 25)	0	(France) La Roche Vendée
14	DF	Stephen Tataw (captain)	31 March 1963 (aged 27)	29	(Cameroon) Tonnerre Yaoundé
15	MF	Thomas Libiih	17 November 1967 (aged 22)	0	(Cameroon) Tonnerre Yaoundé
16	GK	Thomas N'Kono	20 July 1956 (aged 33)	57	(Spain) Espanyol
17	DF	Victor N'Dip	20 August 1967 (aged 22)	16	(Cameroon) Canon Yaoundé
18	FW	Bonaventure Djonkep	20 August 1961 (aged 28)	49	(Cameroon) Union Douala
19	MF	Roger Feutmba	31 October 1968 (aged 21)	0	(Cameroon) Union Douala
20	MF	Cyrille Makanaky	28 June 1965 (aged 24)	0	(France) Toulon
21	MF	Emmanuel Maboang	27 November 1968 (aged 21)	0	(Cameroon) Canon Yaoundé
22	GK	Jacques Songo'o	17 March 1964 (aged 26)	38	(France) Toulon

=== Romania ===
Head coach: Emerich Jenei

No.	Pos.	Player	Date of birth (age)	Caps	Club
1	GK	Silviu Lung (captain)	9 September 1956 (aged 33)	65	(Romania) Steaua București
2	DF	Mircea Rednic	9 April 1962 (aged 28)	74	(Romania) Dinamo București
3	DF	Michael Klein	10 October 1959 (aged 30)	78	(Romania) Dinamo București
4	DF	Ioan Andone	15 March 1960 (aged 30)	49	(Romania) Dinamo București
5	MF	Iosif Rotariu	27 September 1962 (aged 27)	11	(Romania) Steaua București
6	DF	Gheorghe Popescu	9 October 1967 (aged 22)	18	(Romania) Universitatea Craiova
7	FW	Marius Lăcătuș	5 April 1964 (aged 26)	38	(Romania) Steaua București
8	MF	Ioan Sabău	12 February 1968 (aged 22)	21	(Romania) Dinamo București
9	FW	Rodion Cămătaru	22 June 1958 (aged 31)	74	(Belgium) Charleroi
10	MF	Gheorghe Hagi	5 February 1965 (aged 25)	59	(Romania) Steaua București
11	MF	Dănuț Lupu	27 February 1967 (aged 23)	7	(Romania) Dinamo București
12	GK	Bogdan Stelea	5 December 1967 (aged 22)	3	(Romania) Dinamo București
13	DF	Adrian Popescu	26 June 1960 (aged 29)	1	(Romania) Universitatea Craiova
14	FW	Florin Răducioiu	17 March 1970 (aged 20)	3	(Romania) Dinamo București
15	MF	Dorin Mateuț	5 August 1965 (aged 24)	45	(Romania) Dinamo București
16	MF	Daniel Timofte	1 October 1967 (aged 22)	4	(Romania) Dinamo București
17	FW	Ilie Dumitrescu	6 January 1969 (aged 21)	9	(Romania) Steaua București
18	FW	Gabi Balint	3 January 1963 (aged 27)	24	(Romania) Steaua București
19	DF	Emil Săndoi	1 March 1965 (aged 25)	8	(Romania) Universitatea Craiova
20	MF	Zsolt Muzsnay	20 August 1965 (aged 24)	6	(Romania) Steaua București
21	MF	Ioan Lupescu	9 December 1968 (aged 21)	4	(Romania) Dinamo București
22	GK	Gheorghe Liliac	22 April 1959 (aged 31)	2	(Romania) Petrolul Ploiești

=== Soviet Union ===
Head coach: Valeriy Lobanovskyi

No.	Pos.	Player	Date of birth (age)	Caps	Club
1	GK	Rinat Dasayev (captain)	13 June 1957 (aged 32)	90	(Spain) Sevilla
2	DF	Volodymyr Bezsonov	5 March 1958 (aged 32)	77	(Soviet Union) Dynamo Kyiv
3	DF	Vagiz Khidiyatullin	3 March 1959 (aged 31)	55	(France) Toulouse
4	DF	Oleh Kuznetsov	22 March 1963 (aged 27)	49	(Soviet Union) Dynamo Kyiv
5	DF	Anatoliy Demyanenko	19 February 1959 (aged 31)	79	(Soviet Union) Dynamo Kyiv
6	MF	Vasyl Rats	25 April 1961 (aged 29)	46	(Soviet Union) Dynamo Kyiv
7	MF	Sergei Aleinikov	7 November 1961 (aged 28)	61	(Italy) Juventus
8	MF	Gennadiy Lytovchenko	11 September 1963 (aged 26)	54	(Soviet Union) Dynamo Kyiv
9	MF	Oleksandr Zavarov	20 April 1961 (aged 29)	38	(Italy) Juventus
10	FW	Oleh Protasov	4 February 1964 (aged 26)	60	(Soviet Union) Dynamo Kyiv
11	FW	Igor Dobrovolski	27 August 1967 (aged 22)	13	(Soviet Union) Dynamo Moscow
12	MF	Aleksandr Borodyuk	30 November 1962 (aged 27)	5	(West Germany) Schalke 04
13	DF	Akhrik Tsveiba	10 September 1966 (aged 23)	3	(Soviet Union) Dynamo Kyiv
14	FW	Volodymyr Lyutyi	24 April 1962 (aged 28)	2	(West Germany) Schalke 04
15	MF	Ivan Yaremchuk	19 March 1962 (aged 28)	16	(Soviet Union) Dynamo Kyiv
16	GK	Viktor Chanov	21 July 1959 (aged 30)	21	(Soviet Union) Dynamo Kyiv
17	MF	Andrei Zygmantovich	2 December 1962 (aged 27)	34	(Soviet Union) Dynamo Minsk
18	MF	Igor Shalimov	2 February 1969 (aged 21)	0	(Soviet Union) Spartak Moscow
19	DF	Sergei Fokin	26 July 1961 (aged 28)	3	(Soviet Union) CSKA Moscow
20	DF	Sergei Gorlukovich	18 November 1961 (aged 28)	15	(West Germany) Borussia Dortmund
21	MF	Valeri Broshin	19 October 1962 (aged 27)	2	(Soviet Union) CSKA Moscow
22	GK	Aleksandr Uvarov	13 January 1960 (aged 30)	1	(Soviet Union) Dynamo Moscow

== Group C ==
=== Brazil ===
Head coach: Sebastião Lazaroni

No.	Pos.	Player	Date of birth (age)	Caps	Club
1	GK	Cláudio Taffarel	8 May 1966 (aged 24)	26	(Brazil) Internacional
2	DF	Jorginho	17 August 1964 (aged 25)	22	(West Germany) Bayer Leverkusen
3	DF	Ricardo Gomes (captain)	13 December 1964 (aged 25)	30	(Portugal) Benfica
4	MF	Dunga	31 October 1963 (aged 26)	21	(Italy) Fiorentina
5	MF	Alemão	22 November 1961 (aged 28)	32	(Italy) Napoli
6	DF	Branco	4 April 1964 (aged 26)	34	(Portugal) Porto
7	MF	Bismarck	11 September 1969 (aged 20)	10	(Brazil) Vasco da Gama
8	MF	Valdo	12 January 1964 (aged 26)	38	(Portugal) Benfica
9	FW	Careca	5 October 1960 (aged 29)	46	(Italy) Napoli
10	MF	Paulo Silas	27 August 1965 (aged 24)	29	(Portugal) Sporting CP
11	FW	Romário	29 January 1966 (aged 24)	24	(Netherlands) PSV
12	GK	Acácio	20 January 1959 (aged 31)	6	(Brazil) Vasco da Gama
13	DF	Carlos Mozer	19 September 1960 (aged 29)	27	(France) Marseille
14	DF	Aldair	30 November 1965 (aged 24)	18	(Portugal) Benfica
15	FW	Müller	31 January 1966 (aged 24)	31	(Italy) Torino
16	FW	Bebeto	16 February 1964 (aged 26)	26	(Brazil) Vasco da Gama
17	FW	Renato Gaúcho	9 September 1962 (aged 27)	23	(Brazil) Flamengo
18	DF	Mazinho	8 April 1966 (aged 24)	17	(Brazil) Vasco da Gama
19	DF	Ricardo Rocha	11 September 1962 (aged 27)	14	(Brazil) São Paulo
20	MF	Tita	1 April 1958 (aged 32)	31	(Brazil) Vasco da Gama
21	DF	Mauro Galvão	19 December 1961 (aged 28)	20	(Brazil) Botafogo
22	GK	Zé Carlos	7 February 1962 (aged 28)	3	(Brazil) Flamengo

=== Costa Rica ===
Head coach: (Socialist Federal Republic of Yugoslavia) Bora Milutinović

No.	Pos.	Player	Date of birth (age)	Caps	Club
1	GK	Luis Gabelo Conejo	1 January 1960 (aged 30)	32	(Costa Rica) Ramonense
2	DF	Vladimir Quesada	12 May 1966 (aged 24)	0	(Costa Rica) Saprissa
3	DF	Róger Flores (captain)	26 May 1959 (aged 31)	0	(Costa Rica) Saprissa
4	DF	Rónald González Brenes	8 August 1970 (aged 19)	4	(Costa Rica) Saprissa
5	DF	Marvin Obando	4 April 1960 (aged 30)	6	(Costa Rica) Herediano
6	MF	José Carlos Chaves	3 September 1958 (aged 31)	0	(Costa Rica) Alajuelense
7	FW	Hernán Medford	23 May 1968 (aged 22)	18	(Costa Rica) Saprissa
8	MF	Germán Chavarría	19 March 1958 (aged 32)	3	(Costa Rica) Herediano
9	MF	Alexandre Guimarães	7 November 1959 (aged 30)	0	(Costa Rica) Saprissa
10	MF	Oscar Ramírez	8 December 1964 (aged 25)	25	(Costa Rica) Alajuelense
11	FW	Claudio Jara	6 May 1959 (aged 31)	0	(Costa Rica) Herediano
12	MF	Róger Gómez	7 February 1965 (aged 25)	0	(Costa Rica) Cartaginés
13	MF	Miguel Davis	18 June 1966 (aged 23)	?	(Costa Rica) Alajuelense
14	MF	Juan Cayasso	24 June 1961 (aged 28)	1	(Costa Rica) Saprissa
15	DF	Rónald Marín	2 November 1962 (aged 27)	3	(Costa Rica) Herediano
16	FW	José Jaikel	3 April 1966 (aged 24)	?	(Costa Rica) Saprissa
17	MF	Roy Myers	13 April 1969 (aged 21)	0	(Costa Rica) Limonense
18	DF	Geovanny Jara	20 July 1967 (aged 22)	0	(Costa Rica) Herediano
19	DF	Héctor Marchena	4 January 1965 (aged 25)	0	(Costa Rica) Cartaginés
20	DF	Mauricio Montero	19 October 1963 (aged 26)	21	(Costa Rica) Alajuelense
21	GK	Hermidio Barrantes	2 September 1964 (aged 25)	0	(Costa Rica) Municipal Puntarenas
22	GK	Miguel Segura	2 September 1963 (aged 26)	?	(Costa Rica) Saprissa

=== Scotland ===
Head coach: Andy Roxburgh

No.	Pos.	Player	Date of birth (age)	Caps	Club
1	GK	Jim Leighton	24 July 1958 (aged 31)	55	(England) Manchester United
2	DF	Alex McLeish	21 January 1959 (aged 31)	69	(Scotland) Aberdeen
3	DF	Roy Aitken (captain)	24 November 1958 (aged 31)	53	(England) Newcastle United
4	DF	Richard Gough	5 April 1962 (aged 28)	49	(Scotland) Rangers
5	MF	Paul McStay	22 October 1964 (aged 25)	46	(Scotland) Celtic
6	DF	Maurice Malpas	3 August 1962 (aged 27)	34	(Scotland) Dundee United
7	FW	Mo Johnston	13 April 1963 (aged 27)	33	(Scotland) Rangers
8	MF	Jim Bett	25 November 1959 (aged 30)	24	(Scotland) Aberdeen
9	FW	Ally McCoist	24 September 1962 (aged 27)	23	(Scotland) Rangers
10	MF	Murdo MacLeod	24 September 1958 (aged 31)	14	(West Germany) Borussia Dortmund
11	DF	Gary Gillespie	5 July 1960 (aged 29)	11	(England) Liverpool
12	GK	Andy Goram	13 April 1964 (aged 26)	9	(Scotland) Hibernian
13	FW	Gordon Durie	6 December 1965 (aged 24)	6	(England) Chelsea
14	FW	Alan McInally	10 February 1963 (aged 27)	7	(West Germany) Bayern Munich
15	DF	Craig Levein	22 October 1964 (aged 25)	5	(Scotland) Heart of Midlothian
16	MF	Stuart McCall	10 June 1964 (aged 25)	5	(England) Everton
17	DF	Stewart McKimmie	27 October 1962 (aged 27)	4	(Scotland) Aberdeen
18	MF	John Collins	31 January 1968 (aged 22)	4	(Scotland) Hibernian
19	DF	David McPherson	28 January 1964 (aged 26)	4	(Scotland) Heart of Midlothian
20	MF	Gary McAllister	25 December 1964 (aged 25)	3	(England) Leicester City
21	FW	Robert Fleck	11 August 1965 (aged 24)	1	(England) Norwich City
22	GK	Bryan Gunn	22 December 1963 (aged 26)	1	(England) Norwich City

The Scotland squad was numbered according to the number of caps that each player had won at the time. The exception to this was Goalkeeper Jim Leighton who was given the traditional number 1 jersey.

=== Sweden ===
Head coach: Olle Nordin

No.	Pos.	Player	Date of birth (age)	Caps	Club
1	GK	Sven Andersson	6 October 1963 (aged 26)	1	(Sweden) Örgryte
2	DF	Jan Eriksson	24 August 1967 (aged 22)	1	(Sweden) AIK
3	DF	Glenn Hysén (captain)	30 October 1959 (aged 30)	64	(England) Liverpool
4	DF	Peter Larsson	8 March 1961 (aged 29)	36	(Netherlands) Ajax
5	DF	Roger Ljung	8 January 1966 (aged 24)	19	(Switzerland) Young Boys
6	DF	Roland Nilsson	27 November 1963 (aged 26)	32	(England) Sheffield Wednesday
7	MF	Niklas Nyhlén	21 March 1966 (aged 24)	8	(Sweden) Malmö FF
8	MF	Stefan Schwarz	18 April 1969 (aged 21)	6	(Sweden) Malmö FF
9	MF	Leif Engqvist	30 July 1962 (aged 27)	15	(Sweden) Malmö FF
10	MF	Klas Ingesson	20 August 1968 (aged 21)	11	(Sweden) IFK Göteborg
11	MF	Ulrik Jansson	2 February 1968 (aged 22)	0	(Sweden) Östers IF
12	GK	Lars Eriksson	21 September 1965 (aged 24)	3	(Sweden) IFK Norrköping
13	MF	Anders Limpar	24 September 1965 (aged 24)	21	(Italy) Cremonese
14	MF	Joakim Nilsson	31 March 1966 (aged 24)	19	(Sweden) Malmö FF
15	MF	Glenn Strömberg	5 January 1960 (aged 30)	49	(Italy) Atalanta
16	MF	Jonas Thern	20 March 1967 (aged 23)	21	(Portugal) Benfica
17	FW	Tomas Brolin	29 November 1969 (aged 20)	2	(Sweden) IFK Norrköping
18	FW	Johnny Ekström	5 March 1965 (aged 25)	32	(France) Cannes
19	DF	Mats Gren	20 December 1963 (aged 26)	10	(Switzerland) Grasshopper
20	FW	Mats Magnusson	10 July 1963 (aged 26)	29	(Portugal) Benfica
21	FW	Stefan Pettersson	22 March 1963 (aged 27)	19	(Netherlands) Ajax
22	GK	Thomas Ravelli	13 August 1959 (aged 30)	72	(Sweden) IFK Göteborg

== Group D ==
=== Colombia ===
Head coach: Francisco Maturana

No.	Pos.	Player	Date of birth (age)	Caps	Club
1	GK	René Higuita	27 August 1966 (aged 23)	33	(Colombia) Atlético Nacional
2	DF	Andrés Escobar	13 March 1967 (aged 23)	4	(Switzerland) Young Boys
3	DF	Gildardo Gómez	13 October 1963 (aged 26)	0	(Colombia) Atlético Nacional
4	DF	Luis Herrera	12 June 1962 (aged 27)	4	(Colombia) Atlético Nacional
5	MF	León Villa	12 January 1960 (aged 30)	1	(Colombia) Atlético Nacional
6	DF	José Ricardo Pérez	24 October 1963 (aged 26)	2	(Colombia) Atlético Nacional
7	FW	Carlos Estrada	1 November 1961 (aged 28)	1	(Colombia) Millonarios
8	MF	Gabriel Gómez	8 December 1959 (aged 30)	5	(Colombia) Independiente Medellín
9	FW	Miguel Guerrero	7 September 1967 (aged 22)	0	(Colombia) América de Cali
10	MF	Carlos Valderrama (captain)	2 September 1961 (aged 28)	26	(France) Montpellier
11	MF	Bernardo Redín	26 February 1963 (aged 27)	8	(Colombia) Deportivo Cali
12	GK	Eduardo Niño	8 August 1967 (aged 22)	0	(Colombia) Independiente Santa Fe
13	DF	Carlos Hoyos	28 February 1962 (aged 28)	24	(Colombia) Atlético Junior
14	MF	Leonel Álvarez	29 July 1965 (aged 24)	35	(Colombia) Atlético Nacional
15	DF	Luis Carlos Perea	29 December 1963 (aged 26)	33	(Colombia) Atlético Nacional
16	FW	Arnoldo Iguarán	18 January 1957 (aged 33)	58	(Colombia) Millonarios
17	DF	Geovanis Cassiani	10 January 1970 (aged 20)	0	(Colombia) Atlético Nacional
18	DF	Wílmer Cabrera	15 September 1967 (aged 22)	4	(Colombia) América de Cali
19	MF	Freddy Rincón	14 August 1966 (aged 23)	9	(Colombia) América de Cali
20	MF	Luis Fajardo	18 August 1963 (aged 26)	0	(Colombia) Atlético Nacional
21	DF	Alexis Mendoza	8 November 1961 (aged 28)	1	(Colombia) Atlético Junior
22	FW	Rubén Darío Hernández	19 February 1965 (aged 25)	1	(Colombia) Millonarios

=== United Arab Emirates ===
Head coach: (Brazil) Carlos Alberto Parreira

No.	Pos.	Player	Date of birth (age)	Caps	Club
1	GK	Abdullah Musa	2 March 1958 (aged 32)	0	(United Arab Emirates) Al-Ahli
2	DF	Khalil Ghanim	12 November 1964 (aged 25)	4	(United Arab Emirates) Al Khaleej Club
3	MF	Ali Thani Jumaa	18 August 1968 (aged 21)	3	(United Arab Emirates) Sharjah
4	DF	Mubarak Ghanim	3 September 1963 (aged 26)	3	(United Arab Emirates) Al Khaleej Club
5	MF	Abdualla Sultan	1 October 1963 (aged 26)	4	(United Arab Emirates) Al Khaleej Club
6	DF	Abdulrahman Mohamed	1 October 1963 (aged 26)	0	(United Arab Emirates) Al-Nasr
7	FW	Fahad Khamees (captain)	24 January 1962 (aged 28)	2	(United Arab Emirates) Al-Wasl
8	MF	Khalid Ismail	7 July 1965 (aged 24)	3	(United Arab Emirates) Al-Nasr
9	FW	Abdulaziz Mohamed	12 December 1965 (aged 24)	0	(United Arab Emirates) Sharjah
10	FW	Adnan Al Talyani	30 October 1964 (aged 25)	4	(United Arab Emirates) Al Shaab
11	FW	Zuhair Bakheet	13 July 1967 (aged 22)	0	(United Arab Emirates) Al-Wasl
12	FW	Hussain Ghuloum	24 September 1969 (aged 20)	2	(United Arab Emirates) Sharjah
13	MF	Hassan Mohamed	23 August 1962 (aged 27)	4	(United Arab Emirates) Al-Wasl
14	MF	Nasir Khamees	2 August 1965 (aged 24)	0	(United Arab Emirates) Al-Wasl
15	DF	Ibrahim Meer	16 July 1967 (aged 22)	4	(United Arab Emirates) Sharjah
16	DF	Mohamed Salim	13 January 1968 (aged 22)	2	(United Arab Emirates) Al-Ahli
17	GK	Muhsin Musabah	1 October 1964 (aged 25)	4	(United Arab Emirates) Sharjah
18	MF	Fahad Abdulrahman	10 October 1962 (aged 27)	3	(United Arab Emirates) Al-Wasl
19	DF	Eissa Meer	16 July 1967 (aged 22)	2	(United Arab Emirates) Sharjah
20	DF	Yousuf Hussain	8 July 1965 (aged 24)	0	(United Arab Emirates) Sharjah
21	DF	Abdulrahman Al-Haddad	23 March 1966 (aged 24)	0	(United Arab Emirates) Sharjah
22	GK	Abdulqadir Hassan	15 April 1962 (aged 28)	8	(United Arab Emirates) Al Shabab

=== West Germany ===
Head coach: Franz Beckenbauer

No.	Pos.	Player	Date of birth (age)	Caps	Club
1	GK	Bodo Illgner	7 April 1967 (aged 23)	15	(West Germany) 1. FC Köln
2	DF	Stefan Reuter	16 October 1966 (aged 23)	16	(West Germany) Bayern Munich
3	DF	Andreas Brehme	9 November 1960 (aged 29)	51	(Italy) Internazionale
4	DF	Jürgen Kohler	6 October 1965 (aged 24)	27	(West Germany) Bayern Munich
5	DF	Klaus Augenthaler	26 September 1957 (aged 32)	20	(West Germany) Bayern Munich
6	DF	Guido Buchwald	24 January 1961 (aged 29)	32	(West Germany) VfB Stuttgart
7	MF	Pierre Littbarski	16 April 1960 (aged 30)	67	(West Germany) 1. FC Köln
8	MF	Thomas Häßler	30 May 1966 (aged 24)	12	(West Germany) 1. FC Köln
9	FW	Rudi Völler	13 April 1960 (aged 30)	63	(Italy) Roma
10	MF	Lothar Matthäus (captain)	21 March 1961 (aged 29)	74	(Italy) Internazionale
11	FW	Frank Mill	23 July 1958 (aged 31)	17	(West Germany) Borussia Dortmund
12	GK	Raimond Aumann	12 October 1963 (aged 26)	3	(West Germany) Bayern Munich
13	FW	Karl-Heinz Riedle	16 September 1965 (aged 24)	6	(West Germany) Werder Bremen
14	DF	Thomas Berthold	12 November 1964 (aged 25)	35	(Italy) Roma
15	MF	Uwe Bein	26 September 1960 (aged 29)	6	(West Germany) Eintracht Frankfurt
16	DF	Paul Steiner	23 January 1957 (aged 33)	1	(West Germany) 1. FC Köln
17	MF	Andreas Möller	2 September 1967 (aged 22)	10	(West Germany) Borussia Dortmund
18	FW	Jürgen Klinsmann	30 July 1964 (aged 25)	18	(Italy) Internazionale
19	DF	Hans Pflügler	27 March 1960 (aged 30)	10	(West Germany) Bayern Munich
20	MF	Olaf Thon	1 May 1966 (aged 24)	33	(West Germany) Bayern Munich
21	MF	Günter Hermann	5 December 1960 (aged 29)	2	(West Germany) Werder Bremen
22	GK	Andreas Köpke	12 March 1962 (aged 28)	1	(West Germany) 1. FC Nürnberg

=== Yugoslavia ===
Head coach: Ivica Osim

No.	Pos.	Player	Date of birth (age)	Caps	Club
1	GK	Tomislav Ivković	11 August 1960 (aged 29)	26	(Portugal) Sporting CP
2	DF	Vujadin Stanojković	10 September 1963 (aged 26)	16	(Socialist Federal Republic of Yugoslavia) Partizan
3	DF	Predrag Spasić	13 May 1965 (aged 25)	18	(Socialist Federal Republic of Yugoslavia) Partizan
4	DF	Zoran Vulić	4 October 1961 (aged 28)	15	(Spain) Mallorca
5	DF	Faruk Hadžibegić	7 October 1957 (aged 32)	45	(France) Sochaux
6	DF	Davor Jozić	22 September 1960 (aged 29)	17	(Italy) Cesena
7	MF	Dragoljub Brnović	2 November 1963 (aged 26)	20	(France) Metz
8	MF	Safet Sušić	13 April 1955 (aged 35)	47	(France) Paris Saint-Germain
9	FW	Darko Pančev	7 September 1965 (aged 24)	14	(Socialist Federal Republic of Yugoslavia) Red Star Belgrade
10	MF	Dragan Stojković	3 March 1965 (aged 25)	33	(Socialist Federal Republic of Yugoslavia) Red Star Belgrade
11	FW	Zlatko Vujović (captain)	26 August 1958 (aged 31)	63	(France) Paris Saint-Germain
12	GK	Fahrudin Omerović	26 August 1961 (aged 28)	0	(Socialist Federal Republic of Yugoslavia) Partizan
13	MF	Srečko Katanec	16 July 1963 (aged 26)	26	(Italy) Sampdoria
14	FW	Alen Bokšić	21 January 1970 (aged 20)	0	(Socialist Federal Republic of Yugoslavia) Hajduk Split
15	MF	Robert Prosinečki	12 January 1969 (aged 21)	7	(Socialist Federal Republic of Yugoslavia) Red Star Belgrade
16	MF	Refik Šabanadžović	2 August 1965 (aged 24)	4	(Socialist Federal Republic of Yugoslavia) Red Star Belgrade
17	MF	Robert Jarni	26 October 1968 (aged 21)	1	(Socialist Federal Republic of Yugoslavia) Hajduk Split
18	DF	Mirsad Baljić	4 March 1962 (aged 28)	28	(Switzerland) Sion
19	MF	Dejan Savićević	15 September 1966 (aged 23)	13	(Socialist Federal Republic of Yugoslavia) Red Star Belgrade
20	FW	Davor Šuker	1 January 1968 (aged 22)	0	(Socialist Federal Republic of Yugoslavia) Dinamo Zagreb
21	DF	Andrej Panadić	9 March 1969 (aged 21)	3	(Socialist Federal Republic of Yugoslavia) Dinamo Zagreb
22	GK	Dragoje Leković	21 November 1967 (aged 22)	3	(Socialist Federal Republic of Yugoslavia) Budućnost Titograd

== Group E ==
=== Belgium ===
Head coach: Guy Thys

No.	Pos.	Player	Date of birth (age)	Caps	Club
1	GK	Michel Preud'homme	24 January 1959 (aged 31)	23	(Belgium) Mechelen
2	DF	Eric Gerets (captain)	18 May 1954 (aged 36)	80	(Netherlands) PSV
3	DF	Philippe Albert	10 August 1967 (aged 22)	7	(Belgium) Mechelen
4	DF	Lei Clijsters	6 November 1956 (aged 33)	36	(Belgium) Mechelen
5	MF	Bruno Versavel	27 August 1967 (aged 22)	14	(Belgium) Mechelen
6	MF	Marc Emmers	25 February 1966 (aged 24)	16	(Belgium) Mechelen
7	DF	Stéphane Demol	11 March 1966 (aged 24)	29	(Portugal) Porto
8	MF	Franky Van der Elst	30 April 1961 (aged 29)	37	(Belgium) Club Brugge
9	FW	Marc Degryse	4 September 1965 (aged 24)	24	(Belgium) Anderlecht
10	MF	Enzo Scifo	19 February 1966 (aged 24)	39	(France) Auxerre
11	MF	Jan Ceulemans	28 February 1957 (aged 33)	88	(Belgium) Club Brugge
12	GK	Gilbert Bodart	2 September 1962 (aged 27)	5	(Belgium) Standard Liège
13	DF	Georges Grün	25 January 1962 (aged 28)	47	(Belgium) Anderlecht
14	FW	Nico Claesen	7 October 1962 (aged 27)	35	(Belgium) Royal Antwerp
15	DF	Jean-François De Sart	18 December 1961 (aged 28)	3	(Belgium) FC Liège
16	DF	Michel De Wolf	19 January 1958 (aged 32)	27	(Belgium) Kortrijk
17	DF	Pascal Plovie	7 May 1965 (aged 25)	2	(Belgium) Club Brugge
18	MF	Lorenzo Staelens	30 April 1964 (aged 26)	1	(Belgium) Club Brugge
19	FW	Marc Van Der Linden	4 February 1964 (aged 26)	17	(Belgium) Anderlecht
20	GK	Filip De Wilde	5 July 1964 (aged 25)	2	(Belgium) Anderlecht
21	MF	Marc Wilmots	22 February 1969 (aged 21)	2	(Belgium) Mechelen
22	MF	Patrick Vervoort	17 January 1965 (aged 25)	27	(Belgium) Anderlecht

=== South Korea ===
Head coach: (South Korea) Lee Hoe-taik

No.	Pos.	Player	Date of birth (age)	Caps	Club
1	GK	Kim Poong-joo	1 October 1961 (aged 28)	3	(South Korea) Daewoo Royals
2	DF	Park Kyung-hoon	19 January 1961 (aged 29)	11	(South Korea) POSCO Atoms
3	DF	Choi Kang-hee	12 April 1959 (aged 31)	6	(South Korea) Hyundai Horangi
4	DF	Yoon Deok-yeo	25 March 1961 (aged 29)	0	(South Korea) Hyundai Horangi
5	DF	Chung Yong-hwan (captain)	10 February 1960 (aged 30)	12	(South Korea) Daewoo Royals
6	FW	Lee Tae-ho	29 January 1961 (aged 29)	6	(South Korea) Daewoo Royals
7	MF	Noh Soo-jin	10 February 1962 (aged 28)	4	(South Korea) Yukong Elephants
8	FW	Chung Hae-won	1 July 1959 (aged 30)	6	(South Korea) Daewoo Royals
9	MF	Hwangbo Kwan	1 March 1965 (aged 25)	1	(South Korea) Yukong Elephants
10	FW	Lee Sang-yoon	10 April 1969 (aged 21)	0	(South Korea) Ilhwa Chunma
11	FW	Byun Byung-joo	26 April 1961 (aged 29)	11	(South Korea) Hyundai Horangi
12	MF	Lee Heung-sil	10 July 1961 (aged 28)	0	(South Korea) POSCO Atoms
13	DF	Chung Jong-soo	27 March 1961 (aged 29)	1	(South Korea) Hyundai Horangi
14	FW	Choi Soon-ho	10 January 1962 (aged 28)	76	(South Korea) Lucky-Goldstar Hwangso
15	DF	Cho Min-kook	5 July 1963 (aged 26)	10	(South Korea) Lucky-Goldstar Hwangso
16	MF	Kim Joo-sung	17 January 1966 (aged 24)	11	(South Korea) Daewoo Royals
17	DF	Gu Sang-bum	15 June 1964 (aged 25)	9	(South Korea) Lucky-Goldstar Hwangso
18	FW	Hwang Sun-hong	14 July 1968 (aged 21)	7	(South Korea) Konkuk University
19	GK	Jeong Gi-dong	13 May 1961 (aged 29)	?	(South Korea) POSCO Atoms
20	DF	Hong Myung-bo	12 February 1969 (aged 21)	4	(South Korea) Korea University
21	GK	Choi In-young	5 March 1962 (aged 28)	0	(South Korea) Hyundai Horangi
22	MF	Lee Young-jin	27 October 1963 (aged 26)	0	(South Korea) Lucky-Goldstar Hwangso

=== Spain ===
Head coach: Luis Suárez

No.	Pos.	Player	Date of birth (age)	Caps	Club
1	GK	Andoni Zubizarreta	23 October 1961 (aged 28)	49	(Spain) Barcelona
2	DF	Chendo	12 October 1961 (aged 28)	22	(Spain) Real Madrid
3	DF	Manolo Jiménez	21 January 1964 (aged 26)	13	(Spain) Sevilla
4	DF	Genar Andrinúa	9 May 1964 (aged 26)	24	(Spain) Athletic Bilbao
5	DF	Manolo Sanchís	23 May 1965 (aged 25)	30	(Spain) Real Madrid
6	MF	Rafael Martín Vázquez	25 September 1965 (aged 24)	22	(Spain) Real Madrid
7	FW	Miguel Pardeza	8 February 1965 (aged 25)	4	(Spain) Real Zaragoza
8	DF	Quique Sánchez Flores	2 February 1965 (aged 25)	11	(Spain) Valencia
9	FW	Emilio Butragueño (captain)	22 July 1963 (aged 26)	49	(Spain) Real Madrid
10	MF	Fernando	11 September 1965 (aged 24)	2	(Spain) Valencia
11	MF	Francisco Villarroya	6 August 1966 (aged 23)	7	(Spain) Real Zaragoza
12	DF	Rafael Alkorta	16 September 1968 (aged 21)	1	(Spain) Athletic Bilbao
13	GK	Juan Carlos Ablanedo	2 September 1963 (aged 26)	2	(Spain) Sporting Gijón
14	DF	Alberto Górriz	16 February 1958 (aged 32)	8	(Spain) Real Sociedad
15	MF	Roberto	5 July 1962 (aged 27)	22	(Spain) Barcelona
16	MF	José Mari Bakero	11 February 1963 (aged 27)	11	(Spain) Barcelona
17	MF	Fernando Hierro	23 March 1968 (aged 22)	2	(Spain) Real Madrid
18	MF	Rafael Paz	2 August 1965 (aged 24)	3	(Spain) Sevilla
19	FW	Julio Salinas	11 September 1962 (aged 27)	26	(Spain) Barcelona
20	FW	Manolo	17 January 1965 (aged 25)	13	(Spain) Atlético Madrid
21	MF	Míchel	23 March 1963 (aged 27)	44	(Spain) Real Madrid
22	GK	José Manuel Ochotorena	16 January 1961 (aged 29)	1	(Spain) Valencia

=== Uruguay ===
Head coach: Óscar Tabárez

No.	Pos.	Player	Date of birth (age)	Caps	Club
1	GK	Fernando Álvez	4 September 1959 (aged 30)	15	(Uruguay) Peñarol
2	DF	Nelson Gutiérrez	13 April 1962 (aged 28)	53	(Italy) Hellas Verona
3	DF	Hugo de León	27 February 1958 (aged 32)	44	(Argentina) River Plate
4	DF	José Herrera	17 June 1965 (aged 24)	27	(Spain) Figueres
5	MF	José Perdomo	5 January 1965 (aged 25)	23	(Italy) Genoa
6	DF	Alfonso Domínguez	24 September 1965 (aged 24)	27	(Uruguay) Peñarol
7	FW	Antonio Alzamendi	7 June 1956 (aged 34)	28	(Spain) Logroñés
8	MF	Santiago Ostolaza	10 July 1962 (aged 27)	25	(Mexico) Cruz Azul
9	FW	Enzo Francescoli (captain)	12 November 1961 (aged 28)	42	(France) Marseille
10	MF	Rubén Paz	8 August 1959 (aged 30)	42	(Italy) Genoa
11	FW	Rubén Sosa	25 April 1966 (aged 24)	27	(Italy) Lazio
12	GK	Eduardo Pereira	21 March 1954 (aged 36)	10	(Argentina) Independiente
13	DF	Daniel Revelez	30 September 1959 (aged 30)	12	(Uruguay) Nacional
14	DF	José Pintos Saldanha	25 March 1964 (aged 26)	9	(Uruguay) Nacional
15	MF	Gabriel Correa	13 January 1968 (aged 22)	18	(Uruguay) Peñarol
16	MF	Pablo Bengoechea	27 June 1965 (aged 24)	17	(Spain) Sevilla
17	FW	Sergio Martínez	15 February 1969 (aged 21)	14	(Uruguay) Defensor Sporting
18	FW	Carlos Aguilera	21 September 1964 (aged 25)	50	(Italy) Genoa
19	FW	Daniel Fonseca	13 September 1969 (aged 20)	4	(Uruguay) Nacional
20	MF	Ruben Pereira	28 January 1968 (aged 22)	18	(Uruguay) Danubio
21	MF	William Castro	22 May 1962 (aged 28)	8	(Uruguay) Nacional
22	GK	Javier Zeoli	2 May 1962 (aged 28)	14	(Spain) Tenerife

== Group F ==
=== Egypt ===
Head coach: Mahmoud Al-Gohari

No.	Pos.	Player	Date of birth (age)	Caps	Club
1	GK	Ahmed Shobair	28 September 1960 (aged 29)	52	(Egypt) Al Ahly
2	DF	Ibrahim Hassan	10 August 1966 (aged 23)	45	(Egypt) Al Ahly
3	DF	Rabie Yassin	7 September 1960 (aged 29)	81	(Egypt) Al Ahly
4	DF	Hany Ramzy	10 March 1969 (aged 21)	28	(Egypt) Al Ahly
5	DF	Hesham Yakan	10 August 1962 (aged 27)	35	(Egypt) Zamalek
6	DF	Ashraf Kasem	25 July 1966 (aged 23)	38	(Egypt) Zamalek
7	MF	Ismail Youssef	28 June 1964 (aged 25)	29	(Egypt) Zamalek
8	MF	Magdi Abdelghani	27 July 1959 (aged 30)	34	(Portugal) Beira-Mar
9	FW	Hossam Hassan	10 August 1966 (aged 23)	49	(Egypt) Al Ahly
10	MF	Gamal Abdel-Hamid (captain)	24 November 1957 (aged 32)	76	(Egypt) Zamalek
11	MF	Tarek Soliman	24 January 1962 (aged 28)	6	(Egypt) Al-Masry
12	MF	Taher Abouzeid	10 April 1962 (aged 28)	57	(Egypt) Al Ahly
13	DF	Ahmed Ramzy	25 October 1965 (aged 24)	27	(Egypt) Zamalek
14	MF	Alaa Maihoub	19 January 1963 (aged 27)	8	(Egypt) Al Ahly
15	MF	Saber Eid	1 May 1959 (aged 31)	2	(Egypt) Ghazl El-Mehalla
16	MF	Magdy Tolba	24 February 1964 (aged 26)	1	(Greece) PAOK
17	FW	Ayman Shawky	9 December 1962 (aged 27)	4	(Egypt) Al Ahly
18	MF	Osama Orabi	22 January 1962 (aged 28)	1	(Egypt) Al Ahly
19	FW	Adel Abdel Rahman	11 December 1967 (aged 22)	0	(Egypt) Al Ahly
20	FW	Ahmed El-Kass	8 July 1965 (aged 24)	42	(Egypt) El-Olympi Alexandria
21	GK	Ayman Taher	7 January 1966 (aged 24)	?	(Egypt) Zamalek
22	GK	Thabet El-Batal	16 September 1953 (aged 36)	87	(Egypt) Al Ahly

=== England ===
Head coach: Bobby Robson

No.	Pos.	Player	Date of birth (age)	Caps	Club
1	GK	Peter Shilton	18 September 1949 (aged 40)	118	(England) Derby County
2	DF	Gary Stevens	27 March 1963 (aged 27)	39	(Scotland) Rangers
3	DF	Stuart Pearce	24 April 1962 (aged 28)	24	(England) Nottingham Forest
4	MF	Neil Webb	30 July 1963 (aged 26)	19	(England) Manchester United
5	DF	Des Walker	26 November 1965 (aged 24)	18	(England) Nottingham Forest
6	DF	Terry Butcher	28 December 1958 (aged 31)	72	(Scotland) Rangers
7	MF	Bryan Robson (captain)	11 January 1957 (aged 33)	85	(England) Manchester United
8	MF	Chris Waddle	14 December 1960 (aged 29)	52	(France) Marseille
9	FW	Peter Beardsley	18 January 1961 (aged 29)	40	(England) Liverpool
10	FW	Gary Lineker	30 November 1960 (aged 29)	51	(England) Tottenham Hotspur
11	MF	John Barnes	7 November 1963 (aged 26)	53	(England) Liverpool
12	DF	Paul Parker	4 April 1964 (aged 26)	5	(England) Queens Park Rangers
13	GK	Chris Woods	14 November 1959 (aged 30)	16	(Scotland) Rangers
14	DF	Mark Wright	1 August 1963 (aged 26)	24	(England) Derby County
15	DF	Tony Dorigo	31 December 1965 (aged 24)	3	(England) Chelsea
16	MF	Steve McMahon	20 August 1961 (aged 28)	12	(England) Liverpool
17	MF	David Platt	10 June 1966 (aged 23)	5	(England) Aston Villa
18	MF	Steve Hodge	25 October 1962 (aged 27)	22	(England) Nottingham Forest
19	MF	Paul Gascoigne	27 May 1967 (aged 23)	11	(England) Tottenham Hotspur
20	MF	Trevor Steven	21 September 1963 (aged 26)	26	(Scotland) Rangers
21	FW	Steve Bull	28 March 1965 (aged 25)	7	(England) Wolverhampton Wanderers
22	GK	David Seaman*	19 September 1963 (aged 26)	3	(England) Queens Park Rangers

No.	Pos.	Player	Date of birth (age)	Caps	Club
22	GK	Dave Beasant	20 March 1959 (aged 31)	2	(England) Chelsea

* David Seaman was originally selected, but after the first game in Italy, he had to pull out of the squad due to a thumb injury and was replaced by Dave Beasant.

=== Netherlands ===
Head coach: Leo Beenhakker

No.	Pos.	Player	Date of birth (age)	Caps	Club
1	GK	Hans van Breukelen	4 October 1956 (aged 33)	52	(Netherlands) PSV
2	DF	Berry van Aerle	8 December 1962 (aged 27)	22	(Netherlands) PSV
3	MF	Frank Rijkaard	30 September 1962 (aged 27)	42	(Italy) Milan
4	DF	Ronald Koeman	21 March 1963 (aged 27)	43	(Spain) Barcelona
5	DF	Adri van Tiggelen	16 June 1957 (aged 32)	40	(Belgium) Anderlecht
6	MF	Jan Wouters	17 July 1960 (aged 29)	30	(Netherlands) Ajax
7	MF	Erwin Koeman	20 September 1961 (aged 28)	23	(Belgium) Mechelen
8	MF	Gerald Vanenburg	5 March 1964 (aged 26)	36	(Netherlands) PSV
9	FW	Marco van Basten	31 October 1964 (aged 25)	35	(Italy) Milan
10	MF	Ruud Gullit (captain)	1 September 1962 (aged 27)	44	(Italy) Milan
11	MF	Richard Witschge	20 September 1969 (aged 20)	4	(Netherlands) Ajax
12	FW	Wim Kieft	12 November 1962 (aged 27)	27	(Netherlands) PSV
13	DF	Graeme Rutjes	26 March 1960 (aged 30)	7	(Belgium) Mechelen
14	FW	John van 't Schip	30 November 1963 (aged 26)	22	(Netherlands) Ajax
15	FW	Bryan Roy	12 February 1970 (aged 20)	2	(Netherlands) Ajax
16	GK	Joop Hiele	25 December 1958 (aged 31)	6	(Netherlands) Feyenoord
17	FW	Hans Gillhaus	5 November 1963 (aged 26)	2	(Scotland) Aberdeen
18	DF	Henk Fraser	7 July 1966 (aged 23)	2	(Netherlands) Roda JC
19	FW	John van Loen	4 February 1965 (aged 25)	6	(Netherlands) Roda JC
20	MF	Aron Winter	1 March 1967 (aged 23)	11	(Netherlands) Ajax
21	DF	Danny Blind	1 August 1961 (aged 28)	5	(Netherlands) Ajax
22	GK	Stanley Menzo	15 October 1963 (aged 26)	1	(Netherlands) Ajax

=== Republic of Ireland ===
Head coach: (England) Jack Charlton

No.	Pos.	Player	Date of birth (age)	Caps	Club
1	GK	Packie Bonner	24 May 1960 (aged 30)	38	(Scotland) Celtic
2	DF	Chris Morris	24 December 1963 (aged 26)	21	(Scotland) Celtic
3	DF	Steve Staunton	19 January 1969 (aged 21)	13	(England) Liverpool
4	DF	Mick McCarthy (captain)	7 February 1959 (aged 31)	42	(England) Millwall
5	DF	Kevin Moran	29 April 1956 (aged 34)	55	(England) Blackburn Rovers
6	MF	Ronnie Whelan	25 September 1961 (aged 28)	38	(England) Liverpool
7	DF	Paul McGrath	4 December 1959 (aged 30)	36	(England) Aston Villa
8	MF	Ray Houghton	9 January 1962 (aged 28)	29	(England) Liverpool
9	FW	John Aldridge	18 September 1958 (aged 31)	30	(Spain) Real Sociedad
10	FW	Tony Cascarino	1 September 1962 (aged 27)	21	(England) Aston Villa
11	MF	Kevin Sheedy	21 October 1959 (aged 30)	28	(England) Everton
12	DF	David O'Leary	2 May 1958 (aged 32)	51	(England) Arsenal
13	MF	Andy Townsend	23 July 1963 (aged 26)	12	(England) Norwich City
14	DF	Chris Hughton	11 December 1958 (aged 31)	50	(England) Tottenham Hotspur
15	FW	Bernie Slaven	13 November 1960 (aged 29)	4	(England) Middlesbrough
16	MF	John Sheridan	1 October 1964 (aged 25)	8	(England) Sheffield Wednesday
17	FW	Niall Quinn	6 October 1966 (aged 23)	15	(England) Manchester City
18	FW	Frank Stapleton	10 July 1956 (aged 33)	71	(England) Blackburn Rovers
19	FW	David Kelly	25 November 1965 (aged 24)	6	(England) Leicester City
20	FW	John Byrne	1 February 1961 (aged 29)	19	(France) Le Havre
21	MF	Alan McLoughlin	20 April 1967 (aged 23)	1	(England) Swindon Town
22	GK	Gerry Peyton	20 May 1956 (aged 34)	28	(England) AFC Bournemouth

== Notes ==
Each national team had to submit a squad of 22 players. All the teams included 3 goalkeepers, except Colombia and Republic of Ireland who only called two.

== Age ==
=== Player ===
- Oldest: (England) Peter Shilton (40 years, 263 days)
- Youngest: (United States) Chris Henderson (19 years, 179 days)

=== Captains ===
- Oldest: (Belgium) Eric Gerets (36 years, 21 days)
- Youngest: (United States) Mike Windischmann (24 years, 184 days)

=== Goalkeepers ===
- Oldest: (England) Peter Shilton (40 years, 263 days)
- Youngest: (United States) Kasey Keller (20 years, 191 days)

== Coaches representation by country ==
Nº	Country	Coaches
2	Brazil	Sebastião Lazaroni, Carlos Alberto Parreira (United Arab Emirates)
2	England	Jack Charlton (Republic of Ireland), Bobby Robson
2	Soviet Union	Valeriy Lobanovskyi, Valery Nepomnyashchy (Cameroon)
2	(Socialist Federal Republic of Yugoslavia) Yugoslavia	Bora Milutinović (Costa Rica), Ivica Osim
1	Argentina	Carlos Bilardo
1	Austria	Josef Hickersberger
1	Belgium	Guy Thys
1	Colombia	Francisco Maturana
1	Czechoslovakia	Jozef Vengloš
1	Egypt	Mahmoud Al-Gohari
1	Italy	Azeglio Vicini
1	Netherlands	Leo Beenhakker
1	Romania	Emerich Jenei
1	Scotland	Andy Roxburgh
1	South Korea	Lee Hoe-taik
1	Spain	Luis Suárez
1	Sweden	Olle Nordin
1	United States	Bob Gansler
1	Uruguay	Óscar Tabárez
1	West Germany	Franz Beckenbauer
