= 1990 FIFA World Cup Group C =

Football tournament group stage

Play in Group C of the 1990 FIFA World Cup completed on 20 June 1990. Brazil won the group, and advanced to the second round, along with Costa Rica. Scotland and Sweden failed to advance, with the latter achieving a unique feat in World Cup history by playing three games in a particular World Cup having every game finish with exactly the same scoreline: a 2–1 loss.

== Standings ==
Pos	Team	Pld	W	D	L	GF	GA	GD	Pts	Qualification
1	Brazil	3	3	0	0	4	1	+3	6	Advance to knockout stage
2	Costa Rica	3	2	0	1	3	2	+1	4	Advance to knockout stage
3	Scotland	3	1	0	2	2	3	−1	2	
4	Sweden	3	0	0	3	3	6	−3	0	

Source: FIFA
Rules for classification: Group stage tiebreakers

== Matches ==
All times local (CEST/UTC+2)

=== Brazil vs Sweden ===
10 June 1990
21:00

Brazil	2–1	Sweden
Careca 40', 63'		Brolin 79'

Stadio Delle Alpi, Turin
Attendance: 62,628
Referee: Tullio Lanese (Italy)

Brazil	Sweden

GK	1	Taffarel
SW	21	Mauro Galvão
CB	13	Mozer	(yellow card) 38'
CB	3	Ricardo Gomes (c)
RM	2	Jorginho
CM	4	Dunga	(yellow card) 88'
CM	5	Alemão
LM	6	Branco	(yellow card) 60'
AM	8	Valdo		(substituted off) 82'
FW	15	Müller
FW	9	Careca
Substitutes:
GK	22	Zé Carlos
AM	10	Silas		(substituted on) 82'
FW	11	Romário
FW	16	Bebeto
CB	19	Ricardo Rocha
Manager:
Sebastião Lazaroni

GK	22	Thomas Ravelli
DF	6	Roland Nilsson
DF	4	Peter Larsson
DF	5	Roger Ljung		(substituted off) 70'
DF	8	Stefan Schwarz
MF	13	Anders Limpar
MF	16	Jonas Thern (c)
MF	10	Klas Ingesson
MF	14	Joakim Nilsson	(yellow card) 83'
FW	20	Mats Magnusson		(substituted off) 46'
FW	17	Tomas Brolin
Substitutes:
GK	12	Lars Eriksson
MF	7	Niclas Nylén
MF	15	Glenn Strömberg		(substituted on) 70'
DF	19	Mats Gren
FW	21	Stefan Pettersson		(substituted on) 46'
Manager:
Olle Nordin

Assistant referees:
Michel Vautrot (France)
Neji Jouini (Tunisia)

=== Costa Rica vs Scotland ===
11 June 1990
17:00

Costa Rica	1–0	Scotland
Cayasso 49'

Stadio Luigi Ferraris, Genoa
Attendance: 30,867
Referee: Juan Carlos Loustau (Argentina)

Costa Rica	Scotland

GK	1	Luis Gabelo Conejo
SW	3	Róger Flores (c)
DF	8	Germán Chavarría
DF	20	Mauricio Montero
DF	6	José Carlos Chaves
MF	4	Rónald González Brenes
MF	10	Óscar Ramírez
MF	12	Róger Gómez
FW	14	Juan Cayasso
FW	19	Héctor Marchena
FW	11	Claudio Jara	(substituted off) 85'
Substitutes:
GK	21	Hermidio Barrantes
DF	5	Marvin Obando
FW	7	Hernán Medford	(substituted on) 85'
FW	9	Alexandre Guimarães
MF	17	Roy Myers
Manager:
(Socialist Federal Republic of Yugoslavia) Bora Milutinović

GK	1	Jim Leighton
DF	4	Richard Gough	(substituted off) 46'
DF	2	Alex McLeish
DF	3	Roy Aitken (c)
DF	19	David McPherson
DF	6	Maurice Malpas
MF	5	Paul McStay
MF	8	Jim Bett	(substituted off) 74'
MF	16	Stuart McCall
FW	7	Mo Johnston
FW	14	Alan McInally
Substitutes:
GK	12	Andy Goram
FW	9	Ally McCoist	(substituted on) 74'
MF	10	Murdo MacLeod
MF	13	Gordon Durie
DF	17	Stewart McKimmie	(substituted on) 46'
Manager:
Andy Roxburgh

Assistant referees:
Carlos Maciel (Paraguay)
Elías Jácome (Ecuador)

=== Brazil vs Costa Rica ===
16 June 1990
17:00

Brazil	1–0	Costa Rica
Müller 33'

Stadio Delle Alpi, Turin
Attendance: 58,007
Referee: Neji Jouini (Tunisia)

Brazil	Costa Rica

GK	1	Taffarel
SW	21	Mauro Galvão
CB	13	Mozer	(yellow card) 90'
CB	3	Ricardo Gomes (c)
RM	2	Jorginho	(yellow card) 88'
CM	5	Alemão
CM	4	Dunga
LM	6	Branco
AM	8	Valdo		(substituted off) 86'
FW	15	Müller
FW	9	Careca		(substituted off) 83'
Substitutes:
GK	22	Zé Carlos
AM	10	Silas		(substituted on) 86'
FW	11	Romário
FW	16	Bebeto		(substituted on) 83'
DF	19	Ricardo Rocha
Manager:
Sebastião Lazaroni

GK	1	Luis Gabelo Conejo
SW	3	Róger Flores (c)
RB	8	Germán Chavarría
CB	20	Mauricio Montero
LB	6	José Carlos Chaves
DM	4	Rónald González Brenes
DM	19	Héctor Marchena
RW	14	Juan Cayasso		(substituted off) 78'
CM	10	Óscar Ramírez
LM	12	Róger Gómez	(yellow card) 59'
CF	11	Claudio Jara	(yellow card) 16'	(substituted off) 71'
Substitutes:
GK	21	Hermidio Barrantes
DF	5	Marvin Obando
FW	7	Hernán Medford
MF	9	Alexandre Guimarães		(substituted on) 78'
MF	17	Roy Myers		(substituted on) 71'
Manager:
(Socialist Federal Republic of Yugoslavia) Bora Milutinović

Assistant referees:
Jean-Fidèle Diramba (Gabon)
Jassim Mandi (Bahrain)

=== Sweden vs Scotland ===
16 June 1990
21:00

Sweden	1–2	Scotland
Strömberg 85'		McCall 11'; Johnston 81' (pen.)

Stadio Luigi Ferraris, Genoa
Attendance: 31,823
Referee: Carlos Maciel (Paraguay)

Sweden	Scotland

GK	22	Thomas Ravelli
RB	6	Roland Nilsson
CB	4	Peter Larsson		(substituted off) 75'
CB	3	Glenn Hysén (c)
LB	8	Stefan Schwarz
RM	13	Anders Limpar
CM	10	Klas Ingesson
CM	16	Jonas Thern	(yellow card) 59'
LM	14	Joakim Nilsson
CF	17	Tomas Brolin
CF	21	Stefan Pettersson		(substituted off) 63'
Substitutes:
GK	12	Lars Eriksson
DF	5	Roger Ljung
MF	9	Leif Engqvist
MF	15	Glenn Strömberg		(substituted on) 75'
FW	18	Johnny Ekström		(substituted on) 63'
Manager:
Olle Nordin

GK	1	Jim Leighton
RB	19	David McPherson	(yellow card) 69'
CB	15	Craig Levein
CB	2	Alex McLeish
LB	6	Maurice Malpas
RM	3	Roy Aitken (c)
CM	16	Stuart McCall
CM	10	Murdo MacLeod
LM	13	Gordon Durie		(substituted off) 75'
CF	21	Robert Fleck		(substituted off) 84'
CF	7	Mo Johnston
Substitutes:
GK	12	Andy Goram
MF	5	Paul McStay		(substituted on) 75'
FW	9	Ally McCoist		(substituted on) 84'
DF	17	Stewart McKimmie
MF	20	Gary McAllister
Manager:
Andy Roxburgh

Assistant referees:
Vincent Mauro (United States)
Michał Listkiewicz (Poland)

=== Brazil vs Scotland ===
20 June 1990
21:00

Brazil	1–0	Scotland
Müller 81'

Stadio Delle Alpi, Turin
Attendance: 62,502
Referee: Helmut Kohl (Austria)

Brazil	Scotland

GK	1	Taffarel
SW	21	Mauro Galvão
CB	19	Ricardo Rocha
CB	3	Ricardo Gomes (c)
RM	2	Jorginho
CM	4	Dunga
CM	5	Alemão
LM	6	Branco
AM	8	Valdo
FW	9	Careca
FW	11	Romário	(substituted off) 65'
Substitutes:
GK	22	Zé Carlos
AM	10	Silas
FW	15	Müller	(substituted on) 65'
FW	16	Bebeto
RM	18	Mazinho
Manager:
Sebastião Lazaroni

GK	1	Jim Leighton
SW	3	Roy Aitken (c)
DF	17	Stewart McKimmie
DF	2	Alex McLeish
DF	19	David McPherson
DF	6	Maurice Malpas
MF	5	Paul McStay
MF	10	Murdo MacLeod	(yellow card) 8'	(substituted off) 39'
MF	16	Stuart McCall
FW	7	Mo Johnston	(yellow card) 5'
FW	9	Ally McCoist		(substituted off) 79'
Substitutes:
GK	12	Andy Goram
DF	11	Gary Gillespie		(substituted on) 39'
MF	18	John Collins
MF	20	Gary McAllister
FW	21	Robert Fleck		(substituted on) 79'
Manager:
Andy Roxburgh

Assistant referees:
Michał Listkiewicz (Poland)
Siegfried Kirschen (East Germany)

=== Sweden vs Costa Rica ===
20 June 1990
21:00

Sweden	1–2	Costa Rica
Ekström 32'		Flores 75'; Medford 87'

Stadio Luigi Ferraris, Genoa
Attendance: 30,223
Referee: Zoran Petrović (Yugoslavia)

Sweden	Costa Rica

GK	22	Thomas Ravelli
DF	6	Roland Nilsson
DF	3	Glenn Hysén (c)
DF	8	Stefan Schwarz	(yellow card) 74'
MF	21	Stefan Pettersson
MF	15	Glenn Strömberg	(yellow card) 20'	(substituted off) 81'
MF	4	Peter Larsson
MF	10	Klas Ingesson
MF	14	Joakim Nilsson
FW	18	Johnny Ekström
FW	17	Tomas Brolin		(substituted off) 34'
Substitutes:
GK	12	Lars Eriksson
DF	5	Roger Ljung
MF	9	Leif Engqvist		(substituted on) 81'
MF	13	Anders Limpar
DF	19	Mats Gren		(substituted on) 34'
Manager:
Olle Nordin

GK	1	Luis Gabelo Conejo
SW	3	Róger Flores (c)
DF	8	Germán Chavarría		(substituted off) 73'
DF	20	Mauricio Montero
DF	6	José Carlos Chaves
MF	4	Rónald González Brenes
MF	10	Óscar Ramírez
MF	12	Róger Gómez	(yellow card) 28'	(substituted off) 60'
MF	14	Juan Cayasso
FW	19	Héctor Marchena	(yellow card) 53'
FW	11	Claudio Jara
Substitutes:
GK	21	Hermidio Barrantes
DF	5	Marvin Obando
FW	7	Hernán Medford		(substituted on) 60'
FW	9	Alexandre Guimarães		(substituted on) 73'
MF	17	Roy Myers
Manager:
(Socialist Federal Republic of Yugoslavia) Bora Milutinović

Assistant referees:
Alan Snoddy (Northern Ireland)
George Courtney (England)

== See also ==
- Brazil at the FIFA World Cup
- Costa Rica at the FIFA World Cup
- Scotland at the FIFA World Cup
- Sweden at the FIFA World Cup
