= Geovanny Jara =

Costa Rican footballer (born 1967)

Personal information
- Full name: Geovanny Jara Granados
- Date of birth: July 20, 1967 (age 59)
- Place of birth: Puntarenas, Costa Rica
- Position: Defender

Senior career*
Years	Team	Apps	(Gls)
1986–2004	Herediano	422	
2004	Puntarenas		
2005	Belén		
2005–2006	Ramonense		

International career
1990–2002	Costa Rica	11	(0)
- * Club domestic league appearances and goals

Geovanny Jara Granados (born July 20, 1967) is a Costa Rican former football player.

== Club career ==
=== Herediano ===
Jara made his debut for Herediano and played 422 league matches for them, a club record behind Germán Chavarría and Marvin Obando. He totalled 452 matches including cup and international games. In summer 2004 he left the club after 18 seasons after only being offered a six-month contract extension. In 2008 Jara sued Herediano for outstanding payments and interests.

He was dismissed by Puntarenas in November 2004 and joined Belén in January 2005 only to move on to Ramonense later that year.

In October 2002, he was reported as the most sent off-player of the Costa Rican league since 1970 with 23 expulsions.

== International career ==
He was part of the national team squad, that played in the 1990 FIFA World Cup held in Italy but he did not play in any game, reportedly because he was dating the Italian daughter of the owner of the hotel where they stayed and who tempted him to go out at night. He made his debut in a May 1990 Marlboro Cup match against Poland and collected 11 caps, scoring no goals for the Ticos. He played his final international on March 27, 2002 against Morocco, averaging only 1 international per year. Jara also represented Costa Rica at the 1999 UNCAF Nations Cup as well as in the 1997 Copa América, playing against Colombia on June 16, 1997.

Also, he featured in the Costa Rica national team in the 1992 FIFA Futsal World Championship.

== Personal life ==
He is a son of Miriam Granados and brother of Herediano and national team hero Claudio Jara.
