= Miguel Segura =

Costa Rican footballer (born 1963)

Personal information
- Full name: Miguel Antonio Segura Vargas
- Date of birth: 2 September 1963 (age 63)
- Place of birth: San Juan de Tibás, Costa Rica
- Position: Goalkeeper

Team information
- Current team: Belén (goalkeeper coach)

Senior career*
Years	Team	Apps	(Gls)
1983–1986	Sagrada Familia		
1986	Ramonense		
1987–1991	Saprissa	83	
1991	Palmares		
1992–1993	Turrialba		
1993–1994	Limonense		
1994–1997	Municipal Limeño		
1997	Dragón		
1998	Turrialba		
1998–2000	Deportivo Carchá		

International career
1983–1990	Costa Rica	0	(0)
- * Club domestic league appearances and goals

Miguel Antonio Segura Vargas (born 2 September 1963) is a Costa Rican retired football goalkeeper.

== Club career ==
He started his career in 1983 at Sagrada Familia, had a spell at Ramonense and moved to Saprissa in 1987. He ended up playing 83 games for Saprissa. He also played for Palmares, Turrialba, Limonense and abroad for Salvadoran sides Municipal Limeño and Dragón and Guatemalan outfit Deportivo Carchá.

When with Saprissa, Segura set a new Costa Rican Primera Division record of keeping a clean sheet of 855 minutes during 10 matches in 1989. Until 2012, he also held the Centroamerican record but was surpassed by Guatemalan goalkeeper Ricardo Jerez.

== International career ==
Nicknamed Manguera, Segura was a non-playing squad member for Costa Rica in the 1990 FIFA World Cup.

== Retirement ==
After retiring as a player, Segura worked in the minor leagues as a coach. He also worked as a goalkeeper coach, for Cartaginés and Uruguay de Coronado among others. In 2014, he was goalkeeper coach at Belén FC.

== Personal life ==
He is married to Kattia María Mora Soto and has one daughter, Jessica.
