= Elías Jácome =

Ecuadorian football referee

- Full name: Elías Jácome Guerrero
- Born: 2 November 1945; Ecuador
- Died: 27 July 1999 (aged 53); Ecuador
- Other occupation: Engineer

Domestic
| Years | League | Role |

International
| Years | League | Role |
| 1980-1999 | FIFA | Referee |

Elías Jácome Guerrero (2 November 1945 – 26 July 1999) was the first Ecuadorian football referee to participate in a FIFA World Cup. He supervised the Spain versus South Korea match (3-1) during the 1990 FIFA World Cup held in Italy.
