= Michał Listkiewicz =

Polish football referee and official

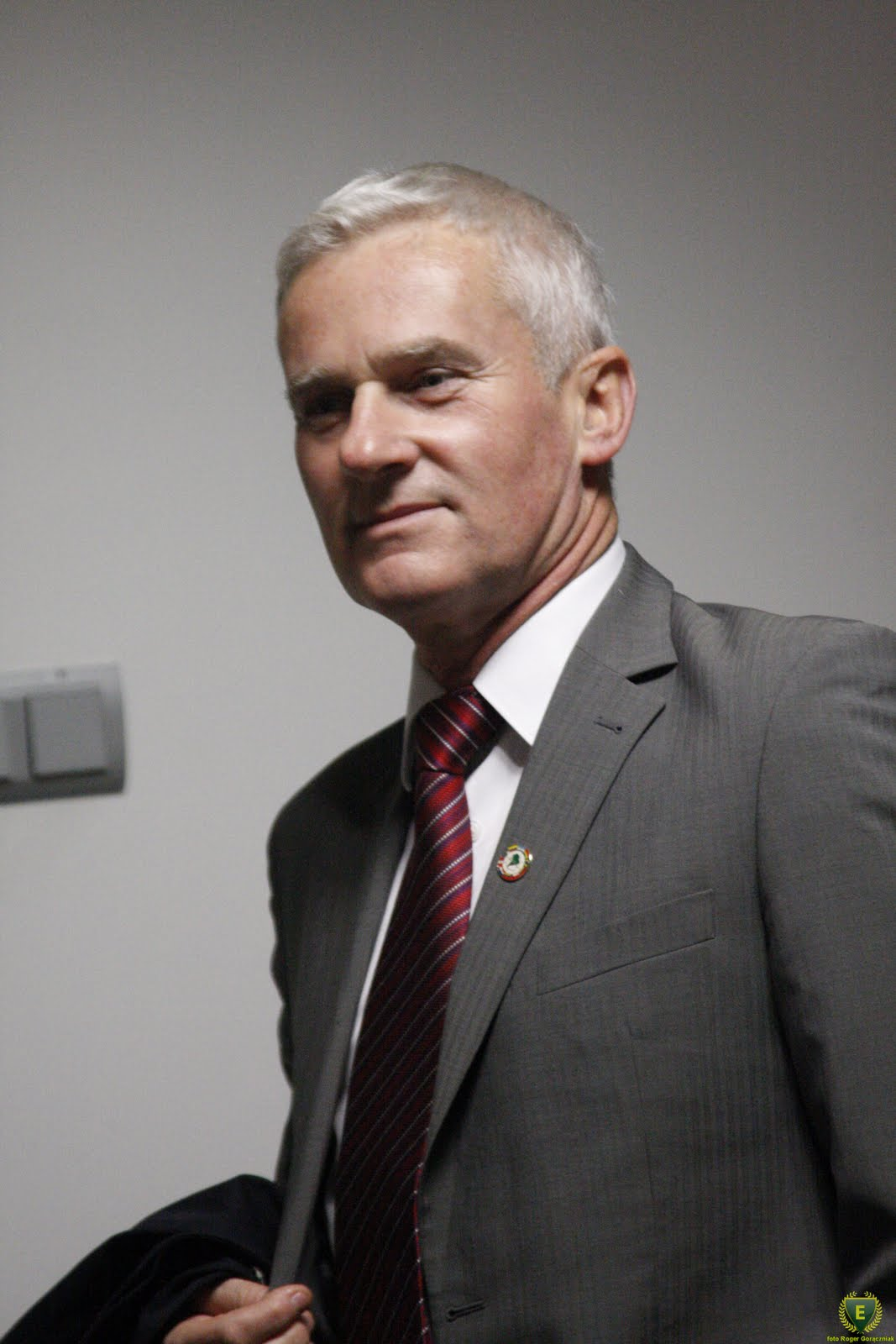
- Born: 20 May 1953 (age 73); Warsaw, Poland

Domestic
Years	League	Role
1989–1998	Ekstraklasa	Referee

International
Years	League	Role
1983–1996	FIFA-listed	Referee

Michał Józef Listkiewicz (born 20 May 1953) is a Polish former football referee and a former president of the Polish Football Association. He graduated from Warsaw University in 1977.

He was a football referee since 1973, officiating internationally since 1983. Referee of the World Cup in Italy 1990, included final match and USA 1994, also Euro 1988 and Olympic Games in Seoul 1988.

Since 1989, he held numerous roles within the Polish Football Association, including press officer, deputy General Secretary, General Secretary and vice-president. From June 1999 to October 2008, he was the Polish FA's president. On 8 July 2016, he became chairman of referees committee of the Football Association of the Czech Republic.

Besides his native Polish, he also speaks fluent Hungarian, English, German, Russian and Finnish.

His son, Tomasz Listkiewicz is an assistant referee who took part in the 2022 FIFA World Cup final in Qatar.
