= Gabelo Conejo =

Costa Rican footballer (born 1960)

Personal information
- Full name: Luis Gabelo Conejo Jiménez
- Date of birth: 1 January 1960 (age 66)
- Place of birth: San Ramón, Costa Rica
- Height: 1.88 m (6 ft 2 in)
- Position: Goalkeeper

Senior career*
Years	Team	Apps	(Gls)
1980–1988	Ramonense	?	(5)
1989–1990	Cartaginés		
1990–1992	Albacete	69	(0)
1993–1994	Albacete	12	(0)
1996	Herediano		
1997	Ramonense		
Total		263±	(5±)

International career
1987–1991	Costa Rica	29	(0)
- * Club domestic league appearances and goals

Luis Gabelo Conejo Jiménez (born 1 January 1960) is a Costa Rican former professional footballer who played as a goalkeeper.

He played mainly for Ramonense and Albacete, during a 17-year professional career. In 2009, the International Federation of Football History & Statistics named him the 34th best goalkeeper of the world for the period 1987–2008, and the seventh in Latin America.

Conejo appeared for Costa Rica at the 1990 World Cup. He also was the goalkeeper coach of Los Ticos in the 2014 World Cup in Brazil.

== Club career ==
Born in San Ramón, Alajuela Province, Conejo made his professional debut for Asociación Deportiva Ramonense, playing his first game in the Primera División on 27 November 1981 against C.S. Herediano and managing to score five league goals during his eight-year spell. He left in 1989 to sign for C.S. Cartaginés, and subsequently joined Spanish club Albacete Balompié, quickly becoming an idol as the Castile-La Mancha side reached La Liga for the first time ever in 1991; he made his debut in the competition on 1 September 1991 in a 2–0 away loss against CA Osasuna, and finished the season with 33 appearances for a final seventh place.

After one year as a backup at Albacete, Conejo returned to Costa Rica with C.S. Herediano in 1996, retiring the following year after one season with Ramonense, aged 37. He had retired two times earlier, not playing in the 1992–93 and 1994–95 campaigns, and his final league match occurred on 2 April 1997 against Puntarenas FC.

== International career ==
Conejo made his debut for Costa Rica in a 1987 friendly match with South Korea, and earned a total of 29 caps. He appeared for his country in ten FIFA World Cup qualification matches, and represented it at the 1991 CONCACAF Gold Cup.

Conejo received international recognition during the 1990 FIFA World Cup: featuring in three matches and conceding only twice, his heroic saves against Scotland, Brazil and Sweden helped the nation reach the second round. He was replaced by Hermidio Barrantes in the round-of-16 encounter against Czechoslovakia because of an injury, and his team was eliminated; he still managed to be selected as one of the two best goalkeepers in the tournament, the other being Argentina's Sergio Goycochea.

Conejo's final international was a 1991 Gold Cup match against Mexico. Subsequently, he worked with the national team as goalkeepers' coach.
