= Hermidio Barrantes =

Costa Rican footballer (born 1964)

Personal information
- Full name: Hermidio Barrantes Cascante
- Date of birth: 2 September 1964 (age 62)
- Place of birth: Puntarenas, Costa Rica
- Height: 1.80 m (5 ft 11 in)
- Position: Goalkeeper

Senior career*
Years	Team	Apps	(Gls)
1983–1991	Puntarenas		
1992–1994	Herediano		
1994–1998	Cartaginés		
1998–1999	Santa Bárbara		
1999–2000	Saprissa		
2000–2002	Limonense		
Total		396	

International career^{‡}
1989–2000	Costa Rica	38	(0)
- * Club domestic league appearances and goals ‡ National team caps and goals as of 1 January 2014

Hermidio Barrantes Cascante (born 2 September 1964 in Puntarenas) is a retired Costa Rican football goalkeeper.

== Club career ==
He made his senior debut for Puntarenas on 20 November 1983 against Ramonense and also played for Herediano, Cartaginés and Santa Bárbara before joining Deportivo Saprissa as their second goalkeeper behind José Francisco Porras, after an injury ruled out regular starting goalie Erick Lonnis. He finished his career at Limonense and played 396 matches in the Costa Rica Premier Division.

== International career ==
Barrantes made his debut for Costa Rica in a February 1989 friendly match against Poland and has earned a total of 38 caps, scoring no goals. He has represented his country in 12 FIFA World Cup qualification matches and was part of the national team that played in the 1990 FIFA World Cup held in Italy and featured in the final of the squad's four games played. He was understudy to Luis Conejo in the three group games, but Conejo's injury allowed Barrantes to step in against Czechoslovakia. He was blamed by some fans for Costa Rica's heavy defeat and received death threats on his return home.

He also played at the 1991 and 1997 UNCAF Nations Cups as well as at the 2000 CONCACAF Gold Cup and the 1997 Copa América.

He played his final international on February 20, 2000 against Trinidad & Tobago.

== Personal life ==
Barrantes is married to Ana Cristina Baltodano and the couple have three sons: Hermidio, Diego Andrés and Carlos Daniel. They live in Desamparados. After retiring, he worked for the Costa Rican Electricity Institute (ICE ) in the Department of Business Services.
