= Carlos Maciel =

Paraguayan football referee

Carlos Maciel (born November 14, 1946) is a Paraguayan former football referee. He is known for having refereed one match in the 1990 FIFA World Cup in Italy.
