= Claudio Jara =

Costa Rican footballer (born 1959)

Personal information
- Full name: Claudio Miguel Jara Granados
- Date of birth: 6 May 1959 (age 67)
- Place of birth: Heredia, Costa Rica
- Position: Striker

Senior career*
Years	Team	Apps	(Gls)
1982–1992	Herediano	375	(99)
1992–1994	Alajuelense	80	
1994	Bucaramanga	10	(1)
1994–1995	Herediano		
1995	Alianza	15	
1995–1996	Guanacasteca	12	
1996	Carmelita	10	

International career
1983–1994	Costa Rica	46	(11)

Managerial career
- 2010: Sagrada Familia
- 2012: Herediano
- * Club domestic league appearances and goals

Claudio Miguel Jara Granados (born 6 May 1959) is a former Costa Rican football striker who played more than a decade for Herediano and participated in the 1990 FIFA World Cup finals.

== Club career ==
Born in Heredia, Jara began playing football with local side Herediano. He made his debut in 1982, and became Herediano's all-time leading goal-scorer, with 98 league goals during his 11 years with the club. He totalled 375 matches for the club. He spent 15 seasons playing in the Costa Rican Primera División with Herediano, Alajuelense, Guanacasteca and Carmelita. In 1992, Jara left Herediano to sign with Alajuelense. A six-month spell with Colombian side Atlético Bucaramanga followed.

In 1994, he returned to Heredia, but quickly moved to El Salvador to play one season with Alianza. Next, he returned to Costa Rica and played for Guanacasteca and Carmelita, retiring from football after suffering a serious knee injury in 1996.

== International career ==
He was part of the national team squad, that played in the 1990 FIFA World Cup held in Italy and featured in all four games played. The striker made his debut for the Ticos in 1983 and collected 46 caps, scoring 11 goals.

He played his final international on 17 December 1994 against Saudi Arabia.

== Managerial career ==
After he retired from playing football, Jara became a football coach. He was appointed manager of Sagrada Familia in January 2010. In December 2012 he resigned at Herediano after 4 months at the helm.

== Personal life ==
His brother Geovanny Jara played 422 matches for Herediano and also played for the national team.
