= Zé Carlos (footballer, born 1962) =

Brazilian footballer

Personal information
- Full name: José Carlos da Costa Araújo
- Date of birth: 7 February 1962
- Place of birth: Rio de Janeiro, Brazil
- Date of death: 24 July 2009 (aged 47)
- Place of death: Rio de Janeiro, Brazil
- Height: 1.92 m (6 ft 3 1/2 in)
- Position: Goalkeeper

Senior career*
Years	Team	Apps	(Gls)
1983	Americano		
1983	Flamengo		
1984	Rio Branco		
1984–1991	Flamengo	107	(0)
1992	Cruzeiro	4	(0)
1992–1994	Farense	57	(0)
1994–1995	Vitória de Guimarães	15	(0)
1995–1996	Felgueiras	26	(0)
1996–1997	Flamengo	17	(0)
1997	Vitória	15	(0)
1999	XV de Piracicaba		
1999	América		
2000	Tubarão		

International career
1988–1990	Brazil	3	(0)
Medal record
Men's football
Representing Brazil
Olympic Games
Silver medal – second place	1988 Seoul	Team competition
- * Club domestic league appearances and goals

José Carlos da Costa Araújo (7 February 1962 – 24 July 2009), best known as Zé Carlos, was a Brazilian association footballer who played as a goalkeeper. At international level, he played for the Brazil national team at the 1990 FIFA World Cup.

== Career ==
Throughout his career (1983–2000) he played for Americano de Campos, Flamengo, Rio Branco, Cruzeiro, Vitória, XV de Piracicaba, América and Tubarão. He played also in Portugal, where he defended Vitória de Guimarães, SC Farense, and Felgueiras. The best moment in his career came when he played for Flamengo, in the late eighties, when he won one Brazilian championship in 1987 and one Rio de Janeiro state championship in 1986.

At that time he was often called up for the Brazil national football team, but was usually the second goalkeeper after Taffarel. That was the case in the 1988 Olympics. He did play on two occasions in 1989. However, during the 1990 FIFA World Cup, he only made the third goalkeeper, after Taffarel and Acácio.

=== List of goals scored ===
#	Date	Venue	Host team	Result	Away team	Competition	Score	Type	Opponent goalkeeper
1	27 February 1997	Estádio Vivaldão, Manaus	Nacional	2–6	Flamengo	Copa do Brasil	2–6	Penalty kick	Bernuncio

== Death ==
Zé Carlos died on 24 July 2009 of abdominal cancer, after more than one month at a hospital in Rio de Janeiro.

Flamengo goalkeeper Bruno chose to wear Zé Carlos' name on the back of his shirt for the remainder of the 2009 season.
