= Mauricio Montero =

Costa Rican footballer (born 1963)

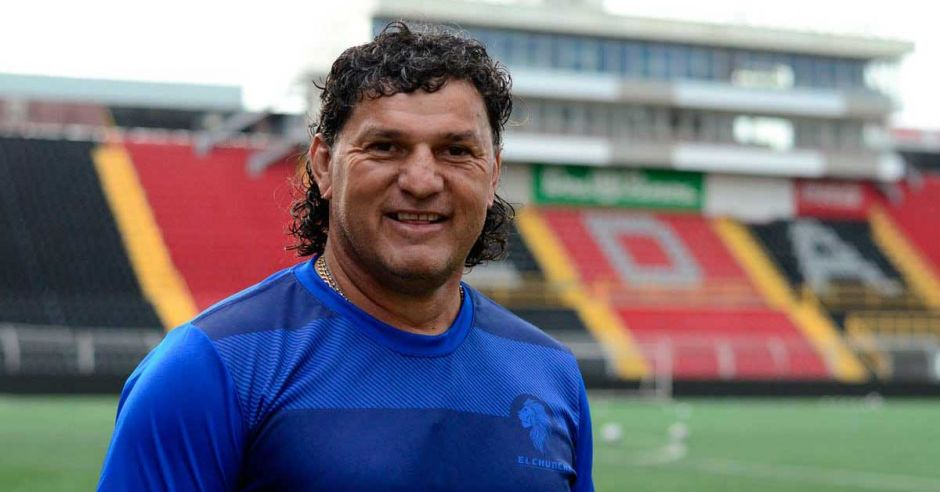

Personal information
- Full name: Mauricio Antonio de la Trinidad; Montero Chinchilla
- Date of birth: 19 October 1963 (age 63)
- Place of birth: Grecia, Costa Rica, Costa Rica
- Height: 1.78 m (5 ft 10 in)
- Position: Defender

Team information
- Current team: COFUTPA (Manager)

Youth career
- Ramonense

Senior career*
Years	Team	Apps	(Gls)
1981–1987	Ramonense	148	(8)
1987–1998	Alajuelense	408	(21)
Total		556	(27)

International career
1985–1996	Costa Rica	56	(3)

Managerial career
- 2001: Belén (assistant)
- 2003–2004: Municipal Grecia
- 2004–2005: Alajuelense (assistant)
- 2005–2007: Municipal Grecia
- 2007–2008: Carmelita
- 2010–2013: Alajuelense (assistant)
- 2013–2018: Alajuelense (youth)
- 2017: Alajuelense (assistant)
- 2019: Once de Abril
- 2020–2021: Juventud Escazuceña
- 2021: Marineros
- 2022: Jicaral
- 2022: Guanacasteca (assistant)
- 2022–: COFUTPA
- * Club domestic league appearances and goals

Mauricio Antonio Montero Chinchilla (born 19 October 1963 in Costa Rica) is a retired Costa Rican footballer and current manager of COFUTPA.

Nicknamed El Chunche (The Thing),^{a} Montero is widely known for his humble origins, which molded his behavior and charisma. His colloquial lexicon includes phrases such as chollarse las nalgas ("bust your buttocks"), which he uses as his motto to denote effort.

== Playing career ==
=== Club ===
Montero came through the youth ranks of Ramonense and debuted for the senior team in 1980. He moved to Alajuelense in 1987 and retired on 15 September 1998 after a game against Atlético Bucaramanga. During that match, Alajuelense retired his #20 jersey that he had used throughout his tenure with the club. Montero, however, did not exclusively use #20 during his Alajuelense tenure as he used #12 on occasion between 1990 and 1991, and #3 (belonging to fellow defender Hernán Fernando Sossa) at least once during the 1990–91 season—Montero himself mentioned that he did this out of need due to the actual #20 shirts not being readily available. He totalled 556 league games, 408 of them for Alajuelense.

The nickname El Chunche ('The thing') comes from his answer to what he would buy with a prize he had won. He answered 'Voy a comprarme un chunche' ('I will buy a thing'), meaning he would like to buy a vehicle (Costa Ricans use the word "chunche" to refer to pretty much anything). He is one of the most charismatic soccer players in Costa Rica. He is the creator of El tiro del zoncho (the vulture shot), a play in which Montero headed to goal line, dribbled goalkeeper and shot powerfully above large pole of goal line approximately by 6 feet length from scoring line, the term derives of exaggeration popular told happening that the ball smashed a vulture, bringing it to ground.

=== International ===
Nicknamed El Chunche, ('The Thing'), Montero made his debut for Costa Rica in 1985 and was part of the squad, that played in the 1990 FIFA World Cup held in Italy, and featured in all four games played. The defender collected 56 caps, scoring 3 goals He also represented his country at the 1991 and 1995 UNCAF Nations Cups as well as at the 1991 CONCACAF Gold Cup.

He played his final international on June 5, 1996 against Canada.

=== International goals ===
Scores and results list Costa Rica's goal tally first.

N.	Date	Venue	Opponent	Score	Result	Competition
1.	24 November 1991	Irving Stadium, Dallas, United States	United States	1–1	1–1	Friendly match
2.	27 May 1992	Estadio Ricardo Saprissa Aymá, San José, Costa Rica	Ecuador		2–1	Friendly match
3.	4 March 1992	Estadio Ricardo Saprissa Aymá, San José, Costa Rica	El Salvador	1–0	2–0	Friendly match

== Managerial career ==
A few years after his retirement, Montero became assistant to manager Oscar Ramírez at Belén, then coach with Municipal Grecia in the second division. After two seasons there, he became assistant head coach in his beloved team, Alajuelense and gained the CONCACAF Champions' Cup in 2004 and the national tournament in 2005. He was the coach of Carmelita from 2007 to October 2008. He returned to Alajuelense to become the first coach assistant, again under Oscar Ramírez' management. He was dismissed in August 2013 and put in charge of the club's U-15 team. In August 2017, Montero was promoted back to the first team as assistant coach to newly hired manager Wílmer López. Alongside this position, Montero still acted as coach for the club's U17 team. He was only in that role on the first team for just under two months before another shake-up at the end of October 2017, and Montero returned to coaching only the club's U17 team. In 2019, Montero became the coach of Alajuelense's travel team, Once de Abril.

Ahead of the 2020-21 season, Montero became coach of Juventud Escazuceña. At the end of December 2021, it was confirmed that Montero would be the coach of Jicaral from the new year. After just three months, Montero was sacked in March 2022 after a poor run, with just 2 wins in 10 games. Just over a month later, he was hired as an assistant coach for Guanacasteca.

In June 2022, Montero was announced as the new coach for COFUTPA.

== Personal life ==
Montero is married to Luxinia Ávila and they have three children.

He was a commentator for Canal 7 Teletica Deportes during the 2014 FIFA World Cup.

== Notes ==
^a In Central American Spanish, the word chunche (IPA: ['tʃuntʃe]) refers to an "object whose name is unknown or not willing to be mentioned".
