= Ricardo Rocha (footballer, born 1962) =

Brazilian footballer

Personal information
- Full name: Ricardo Roberto Barreto Rocha
- Date of birth: 11 September 1962 (age 64)
- Place of birth: Recife, Brazil
- Height: 1.80 m (5 ft 11 in)
- Position: Centre back

Senior career*
Years	Team	Apps	(Gls)
1982	Santo Amaro		
1983–1984	Santa Cruz	12	(0)
1985–1988	Guarani	63	(1)
1988	Sporting CP	10	(1)
1989–1991	São Paulo	43	(0)
1991–1993	Real Madrid	67	(0)
1993	Santos	15	(0)
1994–1995	Vasco da Gama	32	(2)
1996	Olaria		
1996	Fluminense	5	(0)
1997–1998	Newell's Old Boys	36	(5)
1998–1999	Flamengo	16	(0)
Total		299	(9)

International career
1987–1995	Brazil	38	(0)

Managerial career
- 2001: Santa Cruz
- 2007: CRB
- 2008: Santa Cruz
Medal record
Men's Football
Representing Brazil
FIFA World Cup
Winner	1994 United States
Copa América
Runner-up	1991 Chile
- * Club domestic league appearances and goals

Ricardo Roberto Barreto da Rocha (born 11 September 1962) is a Brazilian retired footballer who played as a central defender.

== Club career ==
Rocha was born in Recife. During his career he represented Manchete Futebol Clube do Recife (then known as Associação Atlética Santo Amaro), Santa Cruz Futebol Clube, Guarani Futebol Clube, Sporting Clube de Portugal (having a brief spell with the Primeira Liga giants), São Paulo FC, Real Madrid – where he helped to the 1993 conquest of the Copa del Rey – Santos FC, CR Vasco da Gama, Olaria Atlético Clube, Fluminense FC, Newell's Old Boys and Clube de Regatas do Flamengo, retiring at nearly 37.

Rocha was coach of Santa Cruz in 2001 and 2007, without, however, the same success as a player.

== International career ==
Rocha played 38 matches with the Brazil national team in eight years, his debut coming on 19 May 1987 in an exhibition game with England (1–1). He went on to take part in two FIFA World Cups: 1990 and 1994.

In the latter edition Rocha was the starting center back. However, he could only appear 69 minutes for the eventual champions, a 2–0 group stage win against Russia, remaining injured for the remainder of the tournament. His last international match was also a friendly, a 5–0 win over Slovakia on 22 February 1995.

== Honours ==
Santa Cruz

- Campeonato Pernambucano: 1983

São Paulo

- Campeonato Paulista: 1989, 1991
- Campeonato Brasileiro Série A: 1991

Vasco

- Campeonato Carioca: 1994

Real Madrid

- Copa del Rey: 1992–93

Brazil

- FIFA World Cup: 1994
- Pan American Games: 1987
- Pre-Olympic Tournament: 1987
- Rous Cup: 1987

Individual

- Bola de Ouro: 1989
- Bola de Prata: 1986, 1989, 1991, 1993
- La Liga Team of The Year: 1992
