= José Carlos Chaves =

Costa Rican footballer (born 1958)

Personal information
- Full name: José Carlos Chaves Innecken
- Date of birth: 3 September 1958 (age 68)
- Place of birth: Atenas, Costa Rica
- Height: 1.75 m (5 ft 9 in)
- Positions: Leftback; midfielder

Youth career
- 1976–1977: Buchtell High School
- 1977–1980: Saprissa

Senior career*
Years	Team	Apps	(Gls)
1980–1990	Alajuelense		
1990–1992	Inter Bratislava	20	(1)
1992–1994	Herediano		

International career^{‡}
1988–1994	Costa Rica		

Managerial career
- 1996–1999: Herediano (sporting director)
- * Club domestic league appearances and goals ‡ National team caps and goals as of 1 June 2014

José Carlos Chaves Innecken (born 3 September 1958) is a retired Costa Rican football player who played for Alajuelense.

== Club career ==
After spending a year at a high school in Ohio and some time in the youth teams of Saprissa, Chaves joined Alajuelense in 1980 and moved abroad to play for Inter Bratislava in the Czechoslovak First League during the 1990–91 and 1991–92 seasons. He returned to Costa Rica to win the 1992-93 league title with Herediano.

== International career ==
He was one of the eldest members of the national team squad, that played in the 1990 FIFA World Cup held in Italy. Before the tournament, Chaves quit the national team since he was unhappy with coach Marvin Rodríguez, causing the Costa Rican Football Federation to replace Rodríguez by Bora Milutinovic who immediately recalled Chaves.

The left-sided defender or defensive midfielder played his final international game on 27 March 1994 against Norway.

== Managerial career ==
After retiring as a player, Chaves became assistant coach at Alajuelense and then sporting director at Herediano. In 2012, he became a director at Alajuelense junior league team.

== Personal life ==
Chaves is married to Lourdes González Rojas and they have three children.
