= Marvin Obando =

Costa Rican footballer (born 1960)

Personal information
- Full name: Marvin Obando Obando
- Date of birth: 4 April 1960 (age 66)
- Place of birth: Palmar Sur, Costa Rica
- Height: 1.72 m (5 ft 7 1/2 in)
- Positions: Defender; forward

Senior career*
Years	Team	Apps	(Gls)
1979–1983	Herediano		
1984	San Carlos		
1985–1990	Herediano		
1991	Cartaginés		
1992	Saprissa		
1992–1993	Herediano		
1995	Herediano		
1995–1997	Turrialba		
1997–1998	Herediano		
1998–1999	Ramonense		
1999–2000	Municipal Puntarenas		
Total		685	(70)

International career
1980–1994	Costa Rica	51	(1)
- * Club domestic league appearances and goals

Marvin Obando Obando (born 4 April 1960 in Puntarenas Province) is a former Costa Rican football player who played most of his career for Herediano.

Born in Palmar Sur, Obando played a total of 21 seasons in the Primera Division of Costa Rica between 1979 and 2000, and participated in 685 football games. He is the Costa Rican footballer with the most games played, surpassing Julio Fuller by 1 game. He scored 70 goals in the process.

== Club career ==
Obando holds the record as the most-capped player in the Costa Rican Primera División with 685 appearances. He made his professional debut on 22 July 1979 for Herediano against Municipal Puntarenas and scored his first goal on 9 September 1979 against San José. He played from 1979 to 2000 with Herediano, scoring 48 goals for them in 480 matches, San Carlos, Cartaginés, Saprissa, Ramonense, Turrialba and Municipal Puntarenas.

== International career ==
Obando made his debut for Costa Rica in a March 1980 friendly match against Honduras and competed at the 1984 Summer Olympics.

He was part of the national team squad, that played in the 1990 FIFA World Cup held in Italy. The defender collected 51 caps, scoring 1 goal for the Tico's.

He played his final international on 19 January 1994 against Norway.

=== International goals ===
Scores and results list Costa Rica's goal tally first.

N.	Date	Venue	Opponent	Score	Result	Competition
1.	24 June 1980	Estadio Alejandro Morera Soto, Alajuela, Costa Rica	Cuba		3–0	Friendly match

== Managerial career ==
He has moved into the coaching side of the game currently coaching a 2nd division team in Costa Rica (Barrio Mexico). Also, he is now training a new soccer academy for kids of 14 years, called Buffalos Soccer Academy in Costa Rica. He works with Roberto Castro.

== Personal life ==
He has two kids; a son who is also named Marvin and a daughter named Paola.

Marvin Jr. played in the Costa Rican 1st Division, he debuted with Heredia when he was 17 years old. He is currently retired.
