= Germán Chavarría =

Costa Rican footballer (born 1959)

Personal information
- Full name: Germán José Chavarría Jiménez
- Date of birth: 19 March 1959 (age 67)
- Place of birth: Tibás, San José Province, Costa Rica
- Height: 1.70 m (5 ft 7 in)
- Position: Midfielder

Team information
- Current team: Herediano (assistant coach)

Senior career*
Years	Team	Apps	(Gls)
1978–1995	Herediano	492	(23)

International career^{‡}
1983–1994	Costa Rica	46	(1)

Managerial career
- 1996: Herediano (assistant)
- 1999–2000: San Lorenzo de Heredia
- 2001: Club Israelita
- 2014–: Herediano (assistant)
- * Club domestic league appearances and goals as of 1 June 2014 ‡ National team caps and goals as of 1 June 2014

Germán José Chavarría Jiménez (born 19 March 1959) is a retired Costa Rican football player who currently is an assistant coach for Herediano.

== Club career ==
Chavarría made his professional debut for Herediano on 12 November 1978 against Saprissa and scored his first goal on 7 June 1981 against Puntarenas. He would play his entire career for Herediano from 1978 to 1995, making him the club record-holder with most games when he played 492 consecutive Costa Rican Primera División matches without being expelled.

He retired after a testimonial match on 6 December 1995.

== International career ==
The moustached defensive midfielder made his debut for Costa Rica in a March 1983 friendly match against Mexico and collected 46 caps, scoring 1 goal. He was part of the Tico's squad that played in the 1990 FIFA World Cup held in Italy, and featured in all four games played. He also played at the 1984 Summer Olympics in Los Angeles.

He played his final international on December 17, 1994 against Saudi Arabia.

=== International goals ===
Scores and results list Costa Rica's goal tally first.

N.	Date	Venue	Opponent	Score	Result	Competition
1.	18 May 1983	San José, Costa Rica	Honduras		3–2	1984 Olympic Games qualification

== Managerial career ==
In May 2014, Chavarría was appointed assistant to Herediano manager César Méndez.

== Personal life ==
He is married to Angela Chaves and they have two children.
