= Asociación Deportiva Ramonense =

Costa Rican football club

Ramonense
- Full name: Asociación Deportiva Ramonense
- Nicknames: The Poets, Moncho, The Giantkiller
- Founded: 5 April 1953
- Ground: Estadio Guillermo Vargas Roldán; San Ramón, Costa Rica
- Capacity: 5,000
- Chairman: Edgardo Quesada
- Manager: Javier de Lucas
- League: LINAFA
- Clausura 2022: Group B – Occidente
Home colours	Away colours

Asociación Deportiva Ramonense is a Costa Rican football team playing at the top level. It was based in San Ramón, Alajuela. Their home stadium was Estadio Guillermo Vargas Roldán. Nowadays, A.D. Ramonense is playing at the 3rd division of the Costa Rican soccer.

== History ==
=== A.D. Ramonense ===
Founded on 5 April 1953, Domingo Borja became their first president. He was succeeded by Guillermo Vargas Roldán who oversaw the club's rise to ultimately the top tier of Costa Rican football. They remained there for 20 years until their relegation in 1988, clinched promotion again in 1992 and were in the Segunda División de Costa Rica again from 1999 to 2003 and from 2006 to 2008. They had two players at Costa Rica's first World Cup appearance: goalkeeping hero Luis Gabelo Conejo and Mauricio Montero.

Ramonense won promotion to the Primera División de Costa Rica for the 2008–09 season by winning a play-off against Municipal Grecia. Ramonense had previously won promotion to the Primera in 1967, 1992 and 2003.

=== El Poeta de Occidente ===
In 2010, the club was renamed from Asociación Deportiva Ramonense to Club Deportivo Ramonense Poeta de Occidente. In 2012, the club returned to its traditional name.

=== Financial problems and A.D. Municipal San Ramón ===
In 2013 it transpired that second division side Ramonense were struggling with financial problems. Due to these debts, the club were not cleared to play their first games in the 2013 Apertura championship, forcing Uruguayan manager Orlando de León to resign. They were relegated after not playing the entire season and renamed A.D. Municipal San Ramón.

On 18 April 2014, Ramonense founder Guillermo Vargas Roldán died at San Ramón Hospital .

== Player records ==
=== Top scorers ===
- Carlos Losilla (69)
- William Cruz (63)
- Omar Arroyo (34)
- Jose Rodriguez (30)
- Sergio Morales (27)
- Efrain Orozco (26)
- Ronald Perez (24)
- Kervin Lacey (24)
- Alejandro Sequeira (22)
- Gerardo Najera (20)
- Wayne Wilson (20)

=== Players with the most matches ===
- Carlos Losilla (328)
- William Cruz (253)
- Jose Angel Ortiz (232)
- Juan Mora (191)
- Gerardo Najera (176)
- Juan Diego Ulate (173)
- Hilario Falcon (170)
- Leonel Ramirez (169)
- Roger Alvarez (164)
- Carlos Ulate (163)
- ''Foreigner with the most crashes:

Uruguay Víctor Pereira with 79 games

- ''Goalkeepers with the most games:

Luis Gabelo Conejo with 140 and Álvaro Fuentes with 88

- ''Defenses with more games:

José Ángel Ortiz with 232 and Juan Diego Ulate with 133

- ''Flywheels with more games:

Carlos Losilla with 328 and Juan Mora with 191

- ''Attackers with the most games:

William Cruz with 253 and Gerardo Nájera with 176

- 'With the most games in a season':

Henry Fajardo with 45 in 1995–1996

== Stadium ==
The stadium is owned by the Municipality of San Ramón and is used by the Costa Rican Third Division team, the Ramonense Sports Association, which represents said canton. In addition, the team of the Women's Soccer Sports Association of San Ramón uses it as home in the First Division Championship of that discipline.

It is named after Mr. Guillermo Vargas Roldán, who remained in the team for more than three decades.

The stadium has a capacity for 3,500 fans, it has natural grass. Its stands are located on the east (sun) and west (shadow) sides and it has enough space to build stands on the north and south sides, as well as artificial lighting.

For the year 2016, the Costa Rican Sports Institute ICODER assigned a budget of 100,000,000 colones to make improvements to the sanitary battery, dressing rooms, enclosing walls and the roof of the bleachers.

== Current squad ==
As of 5 June 2022

Note: Flags indicate national team as defined under FIFA eligibility rules; some limited exceptions apply. Players may hold more than one non-FIFA nationality.

No.	Pos.	Nation	Player
1	GK	CRC	Gabriel Mora
2	FW	CRC	Ignacio Pacheco
3	DF	CRC	Saul Elizondo
4	DF	CRC	Yeison Álvarez
5	FW	CRC	Daniel Gamboa
6	MF	CRC	Alexander Josue Rojas
7	MF	CRC	José Armando Álfaro
9	FW	CRC	Yustin Castro
10	MF	CRC	Julio Vargas
11	FW	CRC	Keilor García
12	DF	CRC	Kenneth Rojas
13	GK	CRC	Moisés Segura
14	MF	CRC	Jocksan Mora

No.	Pos.	Nation	Player
15	DF	CRC	Yaudit Bogantes
16	FW	CRC	Fabricio Murillo
17	FW	CRC	Juan Diego Mejías
18	DF	CRC	Dany Rojas
19	DF	CRC	Giancarlo Palacios
21	MF	CRC	Marvin Alfaro
24	MF	CRC	Kevin Arroyo
28	MF	CRC	Yeimer González
—	DF	CRC	John Herrera
—	DF	CRC	Jefferson Guzmán
—	MF	CRC	Jorge Santamaria
—	MF	CRC	Johan Villalobos
—	FW	CRC	Dylan Morera
