= Jaber Jasim =

Emirati association football player (born 1979)

Jaber Jasim جابر جاسم
Personal information
- Full name: Jaber Jasim Khamis Khairi
- Date of birth: 7 December 1979 (age 46)
- Place of birth: Emirates
- Height: 1.78 m (5 ft 10 in)
- Position: Goalkeeper

Youth career
- Al Khaleej

Senior career*
| Years | Team | Apps | (Gls) |
| 2002–2010 | Al Khaleej | | |
| 2010–2020 | Ajman | | |
- * Club domestic league appearances and goals

Jaber Jasim (Arabic:جابر جاسم) (born 7 December 1979) is an Emirati footballer. He currently plays as a goalkeeper .

== Career ==
He formerly played for Al Khaleej, and Ajman.
