= Morocco national football team =

Men's association football team

Morocco
- Nickname: The Atlas Lions (Note: Arabic: أُسُودُ الأَطلَس Standard Moroccan Tamazight: ⵉⵣⵎⴰⵡⵏ ⵏ ⵡⴰⵟⵍⴰⵚ)
- Association: Royal Moroccan Football Federation (FRMF)
- Confederation: CAF (Africa)
- Sub-confederation: UNAF (North Africa)
- Head coach: Mohamed Ouahbi
- Captain: Achraf Hakimi
- Most caps: Noureddine Naybet (115)
- Top scorer: Ahmed Faras (36)
- Home stadium: Prince Moulay Abdellah Stadium
- FIFA code: MAR
First colours	Second colours

FIFA ranking
- Current: 5 ▲2 (18 November 2026)
- Highest: 5 (November 2026)
- Lowest: 95 (September 2010)

First international
- Morocco 3–3 Iraq (Beirut, Lebanon; 19 October 1957)

Biggest win
- Morocco 13–1 Saudi Arabia (Casablanca, Morocco; 6 September 1961)

Biggest defeat
- Hungary 6–0 Morocco (Tokyo, Japan; 11 October 1964)

World Cup
- Appearances: 7 (first in 1970 )
- Best result: Fourth place (2022)

Africa Cup of Nations
- Appearances: 20 (first in 1972 )
- Best result: Champions (1976, 2025)

Arab Cup
- Appearances: 5 (first in 1998 )
- Best result: Champions (2012, 2025)

African Nations Championship
- Appearances: 5 (first in 2014 )
- Best result: Champions (2018, 2020, 2024)
Medal record
Africa Cup of Nations
Gold medal – first place	1976 Ethiopia
Gold medal – first place	2025 Morocco
Silver medal – second place	2004 Tunisia
Bronze medal – third place	1980 Nigeria
Arab Cup
Gold medal – first place	2012 Saudi Arabia
Gold medal – first place	2025 Qatar
African Nations Championship
Gold medal – first place	2018 Morocco
Gold medal – first place	2020 Cameroon
Gold medal – first place	2024 Kenya, Tanzania and Uganda
Mediterranean Games
Gold medal – first place	1983 Morocco
Arab Games
Gold medal – first place	1961 Casablanca
Gold medal – first place	1976 Damascus
Silver medal – second place	1985 Rabat

The Morocco national football team (Note: Arabic: منتخب المغرب لكرة القدم; Standard Moroccan Tamazight: ⵜⴰⵔⴰⴱⴱⵓⵜ ⵜⴰⵏⴰⵎⵓⵔⵜ ⵜⴰⵎⵖⵔⵉⴱⵉⵜ ⵏ ⵜⵡⵊⵊⴰ ⵏ ⵓⴹⴰⵔ; French: équipe du Maroc de football) represents Morocco in men's international football. It is controlled by the Royal Moroccan Football Federation (FRMF), the governing body for football in Morocco. It has been affiliated with FIFA since 1960, with the Confederation of African Football since 1959, and with the Union of North African Football since 2005. The team, which is known as the Atlas Lions, plays home matches at the Prince Moulay Abdellah Stadium in Rabat, and trains at the Mohammed VI Football Complex in Salé.

Widely regarded as one of Africa's most successful national football team and one of the best teams in the world, Morocco has won five continental titles, including the 1976 and 2025 editions of the African Cup of Nations. They won the African Nations Championship in 2018, 2020 and 2024. Morocco has qualified for the FIFA World Cup on seven occasions. In 1986, they made history as the first African team to win a World Cup group and advance to the knockout stage. At the 2022 World Cup, Morocco became the first African and first Arab team to reach a World Cup semi-final. They were also the third World Cup semi-finalist from outside Europe or South America. Between 2023 and 2026, Morocco set two world records in international football, recording a 19-match winning streak and an unbeaten run of 33 consecutive matches.

== History ==
=== Formation and early years ===
The Moroccan national team was founded in 1928 and played its first game on 22 December of that year against France's B team, losing 2–1. The team, formed of the best footballers of the Moroccan Football League (LMFA), was active in friendly matches against other North African teams such as Algeria and Tunisia.

On 9 September 1954, an earthquake struck the Algerian region of Orléansville (now Chlef), destroying the city and killing 1,400 people. On 7 October 1954, the French Football Association and the Maghreb inhabitants organized a charity match to raise funds for the families of the victims of the earthquake. In the match, held at the Parc de Princes in Paris, a team made up of Moroccans, Algerians and Tunisians played against France. Led by star Larbi Benbarek, the Maghreb selection managed to win 3–2, a month before the Toussaint Rouge attacks by the Algerian National Liberation Front which marked the beginning of the Algerian War.

In 1955, the Royal Moroccan Football Federation was established, at the end of the French protectorate of Morocco, which had lasted since 1912.

On 19 October 1957, at the second edition of the Arab Games in Lebanon, Morocco made its debut as an independent country against Iraq, at the Camille Chamoun Sports City Stadium, and drew 3–3. At the tournament, Morocco recorded their first-ever win, defeating Libya 5–1, then beat Tunisia 3–1 to reach the semi-finals. After a 1–1 draw with Syria, lots were drawn to decide who would progress to the final, and Syria were selected at Morocco's expense. Morocco withdrew from the third-place play-off against Lebanon and finished fourth overall.

Between 1957 and 1958, Morocco held numerous friendly matches against the National Liberation Front team, the representative of Algeria before its independence in 1958. In 1959, the team took part for the first time in an international competition, the qualifying rounds of the 1960 Rome Olympics. Drawn into a group with Tunisia and Malta, Morocco finished second on goal difference and failed to progress. That same year, the Royal Moroccan Football Federation joined FIFA.

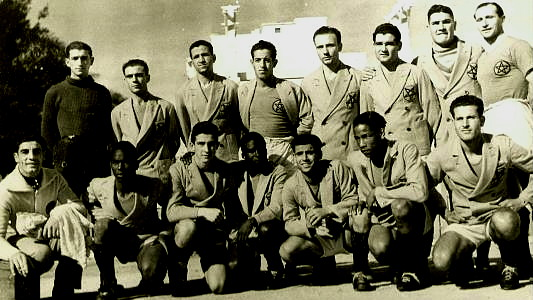
The Morocco national team in 1942 with Larbi Benbarek

In 1960, Morocco competed in World Cup qualification for the first time. Drawn against Tunisia in the first round, Morocco won the first leg 2–1, while Tunisia won the second leg by the same score. A play-off held in Palermo, Italy finished in a draw, so a coin toss was used to determine who progressed. Morocco won the toss, and beat Ghana 1–0 on aggregate to reach the inter-continental play-offs. Drawn against Spain, Morocco lost 4–2 on aggregate and thus failed to qualify.

The following year, Morocco held the Pan-Arab Games and won the football tournament, winning all five of their matches. Their third match, against Saudi Arabia, resulted in Morocco's biggest-ever victory, winning 13–1. They also claimed their first two wins against a European team, beating East Germany 2–1 and 2–0.

In 1963, the Moroccan team came close to qualifying for the African Cup of Nations; in the decisive play-off against Tunisia, they were defeated 4–1 in Tunis and won 4–2 at home, therefore being eliminated. At the 1963 Mediterranean Games in Naples, they finished fourth after a 2–1 defeat in the final for third place against Spain's reserve team.

=== 1963–1976: First international competitions ===
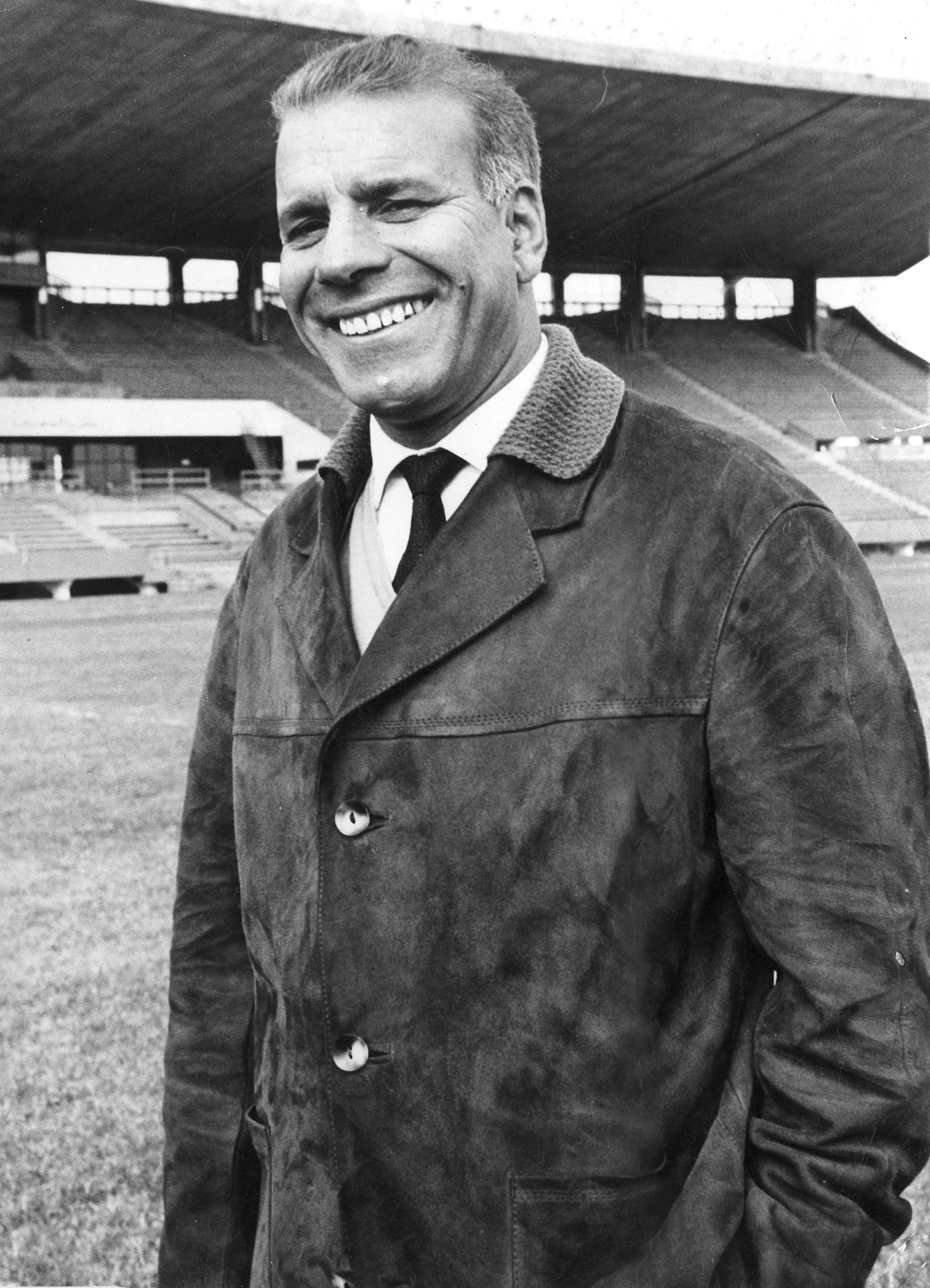
Mohamed Massoun, Morocco's coach in the 1960s

Morocco participated in the final phase of an international competition for the first time at the 1964 Tokyo Olympics. Having qualified under the leadership of manager Mohamed Massoun, the Moroccans were included in a group of three teams due to the withdrawal of North Korea. Morocco lost both their matches, against Hungary (6–0, the team's worst-ever defeat) and Yugoslavia (3–1, despite taking the lead in the second minute via Ali Bouachra).

In 1966, the Moroccan Football Association joined the Confederation of African Football, and the team participated in qualifying for the 1970 World Cup in Mexico. Their debut eliminated Senegal (1–0) and Tunisia after a draw. In the final round of the preliminaries, against Sudan and Nigeria, Morocco obtained five points, finishing ahead of Nigeria. Shortly after, Morocco lost the decisive play-off against Algeria to enter the final stage of the 1970 Africa Cup of Nations.

Morocco thus became the first African national team to qualify for the World Cup after having played in an elimination tournament. The Moroccan team, coached by the Yugoslav Blagoje Vidinić, consisted entirely of players in the Moroccan league, including Driss Bamous and Ahmed Faras.

On 3 June 1970, against West Germany, Morocco opened the scoring with a goal in the 21st minute of the game scored by Houmane Jarir. In the second half, however, the Germans scored twice and won 2–1. The Atlas Lions then played against Peru, conceding three goals in ten minutes to lose 3–0. On 11 June 1970, the eliminated Moroccans drew with Bulgaria 1–1. It was the first point obtained by an African national team at the World Cup.

In 1972 Africa Cup of Nations qualification, the Atlas Lions ousted Algeria, then faced Egypt, defeating them 3–0 in the first leg and suffering a 3–2 defeat on the way back. However, the aggregate win meant they qualified for the final phase of the continental tournament for the first time. In the group stage, they accumulated three 1–1 draws against Congo, Sudan and Zaire and were eliminated in the first round. All three Moroccan goals were scored by Ahmed Faras.

Qualifying for the 1972 Olympics in Munich with two wins and two draws, Morocco debuted in Group A with a goalless draw against the United States, then lost 3–0 against hosts West Germany and defeated Malaysia 6–0 with a Faras hat-trick, thereby advancing to the second round. Due to defeats against USSR (3–0), Denmark (3–1) and Poland (5–0), they were eliminated from the tournament; finishing bottom of their group.

In the 1974 World Cup qualifiers, Morocco successfully passed three qualifying rounds before entering the final stage alongside Zambia and Zaire. Losing 4–0 away against Zambia, the Moroccans bounced back in the second game, defeating the same opponent 2–0 at home. They then went to Zaire for their third game but lost 3–0, conceding all three goals in the second half, with Faras leaving the field due to injury. Morocco filed an appeal, trying to get the match to be replayed; it was dismissed by FIFA. In protest, Morocco withdrew from the qualifiers causing the Atlas Lions to miss their final game at home against Zaire which had already qualified for the finals, with FIFA awarding Zaire a 2–0 win on walkover. For the same reason, Morocco also decided not to take part in the 1974 African Cup of Nations qualification. As a result, in 1974, Morocco played only two games, both against Algeria, achieving a 2–0 win and a 0–0 draw. Morocco then resumed playing in FIFA and CAF competitions, qualifying for the 1976 Africa Cup of Nations by eliminating Ghana in the last round, but failed to qualify for the 1976 Olympics, being eliminated by Nigeria.

=== 1976–1986: Victories and defeats ===
Morocco, coached by the Romanian Virgil Mărdărescu and captained by Faras, took the continental throne at 1976 African Cup of Nations, in only the country's second participation in the competition. Ahmed Makrouh scored in the final to equalize at 1–1, which gave Morocco the first, and to date, only cup in its history.

After failing to qualify for the 1974 FIFA World Cup, they also missed the 1978 and 1982 tournaments. At the 1978 Africa Cup of Nations, they were eliminated in the first round, while in 1980 they finished in third place, beating Egypt 2–0. They then won the 1983 Mediterranean Games, played at home, after a 3–0 win in the final against Turkey B.

Morocco did not qualify for either the 1982 or 1984 Africa Cup of Nations. Two years later, they finished fourth, losing 3–2 in the third-place play-off to Ivory Coast.

=== 1986–2000: The golden generation ===

Morocco's typical starting line-up at the 1986 FIFA World Cup

Morocco qualified for the 1986 FIFA World Cup in Mexico, and topped a group consisting Portugal, England and Poland, thanks to two draws against the English and Polish and a 3–1 win against the Portuguese. However, they were narrowly eliminated by West Germany in the first knockout round, thanks to a goal from Lothar Matthäus one minute from the end of regulation time. Morocco became the first African or Arab national team to advance from the first round of the World Cup.

Two years later, the Moroccan team presented itself at the 1988 African Cup of Nations as a host country with high expectations. After winning in the first round, they were eliminated in the semi-finals by Cameroon and finished in fourth place after losing the third-place play-off against Algeria 1–1 after extra time, 4–3 after penalties.

Morocco failed to qualify for the 1990 FIFA World Cup and was eliminated in the group stage of the 1992 African Cup of Nations. The team also did not qualify for the 1994 and 1996 African Cup of Nations tournaments. Despite these setbacks, the team qualified for the 1994 FIFA World Cup in the United States and the 1998 FIFA World Cup in France. In both tournaments, Morocco were praised for their attacking style of play, led by key players such as Mustapha Hadji, Noureddine Naybet, and Salaheddine Bassir.

At the 1998 Africa Cup of Nations, after winning their group, Morocco were defeated by South Africa 2–1.

=== 2000–2021: Difficult years ===
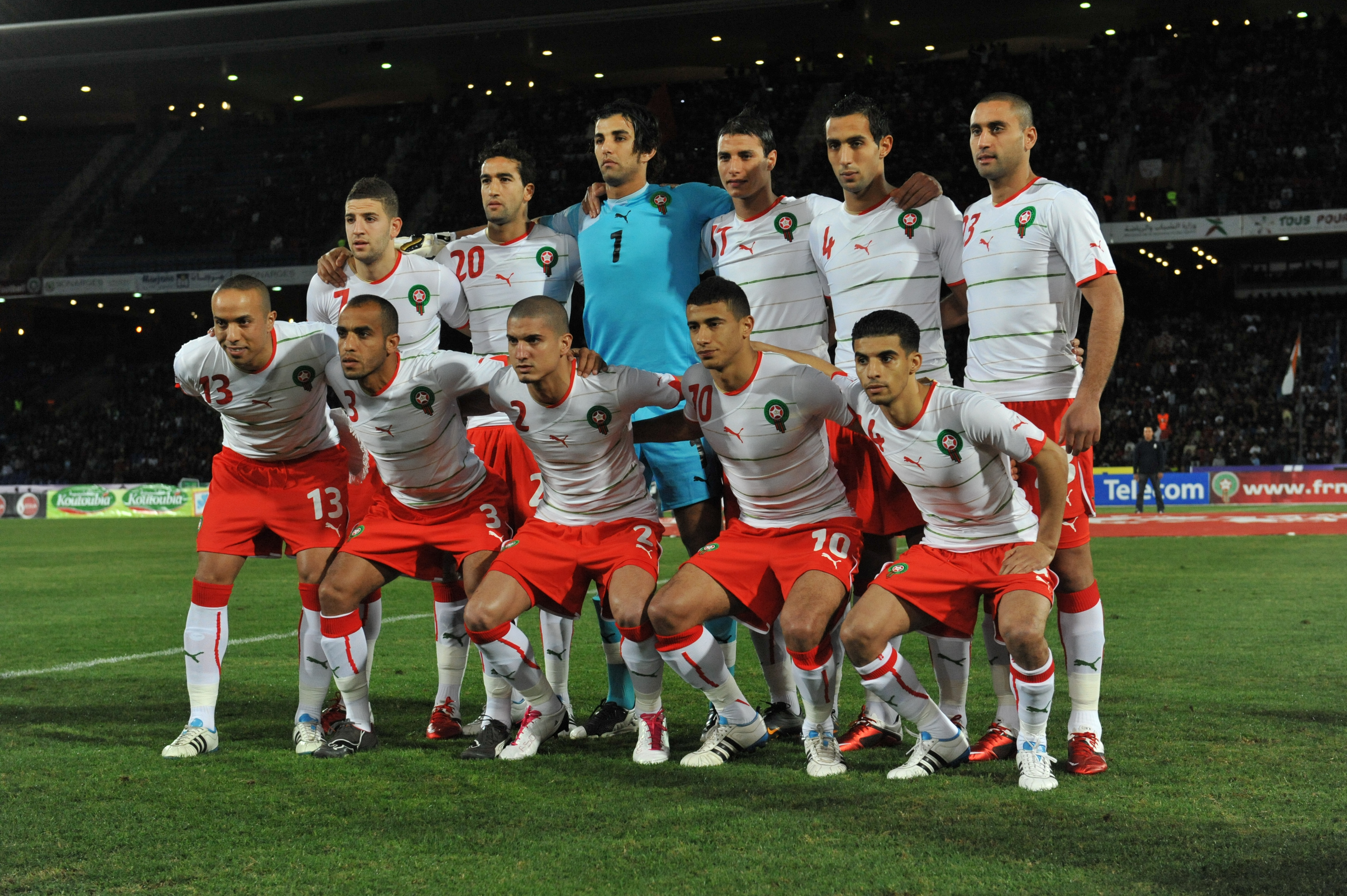
The Morocco national team in 2011

Morocco took part in the 2004 African Cup of Nations, drawn into Group D defeating Nigeria 1–0, defeating Benin 4–0 and drawing 1–1 with South Africa. Morocco qualified to the knockout stages, facing Algeria; they eventually won 3–1 in extra time, and 4–0 against Mali in the semi-final. They lost the 2004 African Cup of Nations Final against Tunisia 2–1.

In 2012, the national team won the Arab Cup, topping their group, defeating Iraq in the semi-final and Libya in the final.

In 2014, Morocco debuted in the African Nations Championship after failing to qualify in the 2009 and 2011 editions. Led by coach Hassan Benabicha, Morocco were eliminated in the second round after losing 4–3 to Nigeria in the quarter-finals. They managed to qualify for the 2016 African Nations Championship, but were eliminated in the group stages. Morocco hosted the 2018 African Nations Championship, which included a victory for the home nation, the third North African country to win the competition's title.

Morocco returned to the World Cup after a 20-year absence in 2018. The North Africans were drawn in Group B with World Cup favourites Spain, Portugal, and Iran. In their opening game against Iran, Morocco showed full dedication but lost 1–0 in the final minutes of the match, scored by an own goal. In their second game, Morocco faced Portugal but ended losing 1–0 by a goal scored by Cristiano Ronaldo and also got eliminated from the tournament. In the last match against Spain they took a 2–1 lead, with goals scored by Khalid Boutaïb and Youssef En-Nesyri, but the match eventually ended 2–2.

Morocco's starting line-up against Mali at the 2020 African Nations Championship Final, a match they won 2–0

Morocco entered the 2019 AFCON with high confidence and players claiming them to be the favourite to win. However, in spite of three straight group stage wins, Morocco were shockingly knocked out by Benin in the round of sixteen.

At the 2020 African Nations Championship in Cameroon, Morocco won their second CHAN title, in its second consecutive final appearance. Captained by Ayoub El Kaabi, they defeated Togo (1–0), Rwanda (0–0), the Uganda (5–2), Zambia (3–1), and Cameroon (4–0) on the way to a final against Mali in Yaoundé. Morocco won 2–0, with both goals scored late into the second half by Soufiane Bouftini and Ayoub El Kaabi. Morocco thus became the first team to win back-to-back titles. Soufiane Rahimi went on to be named Total Man of the tournament after an astonishing performance scoring a total of 5 goals.

In December 2021, Morocco started its venture at the 2021 FIFA Arab Cup's Group C, along with Jordan, Palestine and Saudi Arabia. Morocco opened the tournament with a 4–0 win against Palestine, and then managed to overcome a highly defensive Jordan with another 4–0 triumph, before winning their final match in a 1–0 victory against Saudi Arabia. They were eliminated in the quarter-finals after a penalty-shootout against Algeria.

=== 2021–2026: Comeback ===
After easily topping their 2021 Africa Cup of Nations qualification group which consisted of Mauritania, Burundi, and Central African Republic, Morocco entered the tournament in Cameroon. Morocco were drawn into group E alongside Gabon, Ghana and Comoros, and won their first game against Ghana scored by Sofiane Boufal in the final minutes of the game. In their second game against Comoros, they claimed a 2–0 victory. Their final match against Gabon ended in a draw, making Morocco reach the round of 16 after ending up first in the group. They defeated Malawi 2–1 in the round of 16, before being eliminated in the quarter-finals after a 2–1 loss against Egypt.

Morocco's typical starting line-up at the 2022 World Cup

After qualifying for the 2022 FIFA World Cup by winning the third round of CAF qualifiers, the team was drawn in Group F along with Croatia, Belgium, and Canada. After holding previous runners-up Croatia to a 0–0 draw and defeating Belgium 2–0, a 2–1 win over Canada meant they finished top of the group and advanced to the round of 16 for the first time since 1986. In the round of 16, they met Spain, drawing 0–0. In the subsequent penalty shootout, goalkeeper Yassine Bounou saved two penalties, and Achraf Hakimi scored the decisive penalty with a panenka penalty for Morocco to advance to the quarter-finals for the first time. They advanced further to the semi-finals winning against favourite Portugal, 1–0, with a powerful header by Youssef En-Nesyri. Morocco therefore became the first African and Arab team to qualify for the semi-finals. However, they lost to France in the semi-final, 2–0 on 14 December at the Al Bayt Stadium in Al Khor, putting an end to Morocco's World Cup run. They played Croatia in the third place play-off on 17 December at the Khalifa International Stadium in Al-Rayyan, a rematch of the earlier group stage meeting. They lost 2–1 to the latter, and ended their World Cup campaign at fourth place. The team would go on to donate their entire World Cup earnings from the tournament to charities within Morocco that help with poverty that affects children and families in the country.

In October 2025, Morocco broke the world record for the longest winning streak in international football, surpassing Spain's previous mark of 15 consecutive victories set between June 2008 and June 2009. With a 1–0 win over Congo in Rabat, Morocco extended their unbeaten run to 16 straight wins across all competitions, including World Cup qualifiers and friendlies. The streak, which began in June 2024, ultimately reached 19 consecutive wins before ending with a draw in December 2025.

Morocco won the 2025 FIFA Arab Cup with its national A' team, defeating Jordan 3–2 after extra time in the final. The Moroccan side, composed primarily of players active in domestic and regional leagues, secured the title following a closely contested match in which the score was level at the end of regular time. The victory marked Morocco's second triumph in the FIFA Arab Cup, after its first title in 2012.

Morocco hosted the 2025 Africa Cup of Nations and advanced from the group stage through the knockout rounds, reaching the final for the first time in two decades, where they faced Senegal. The match remained scoreless after regular and stoppage time. During this period, Morocco was awarded a penalty following a foul on Brahim; however, play was interrupted when the Senegalese team left the pitch upon instruction of then-manager Pape Thiaw before returning over 20 minutes later. Consequently, on 17 March 2026, the CAF Appeal Board ruled that Senegal had forfeited the match by reason of refusing to play and leaving the pitch. In accordance with articles 82 and 84 of the competition regulations, the championship was recorded as a 3–0 victory for Morocco, thereby awarding them the title of 2025 Africa Cup of Nations champions.

Morocco once more finished as the best-performing African side at the 2026 World Cup, whilst becoming the first national team from the continent to reach back-to-back quarter-finals. During their run, they overtook Italy as the nation with the longest undefeated streak in international football before bowing out to France.

== Home stadiums ==
Morocco’s primary home stadium is Prince Moulay Abdellah Stadium in Rabat, where the national team plays most of its home matches.

During Ezzaki Badou’s tenure as head coach from 2014 to 2016, Morocco played most of its matches at the Adrar Stadium in Agadir, which has a capacity of 45,480. Morocco also has several other large venues, including Fez Stadium, Marrakesh Stadium, and Ibn Battouta Stadium in Tangier.

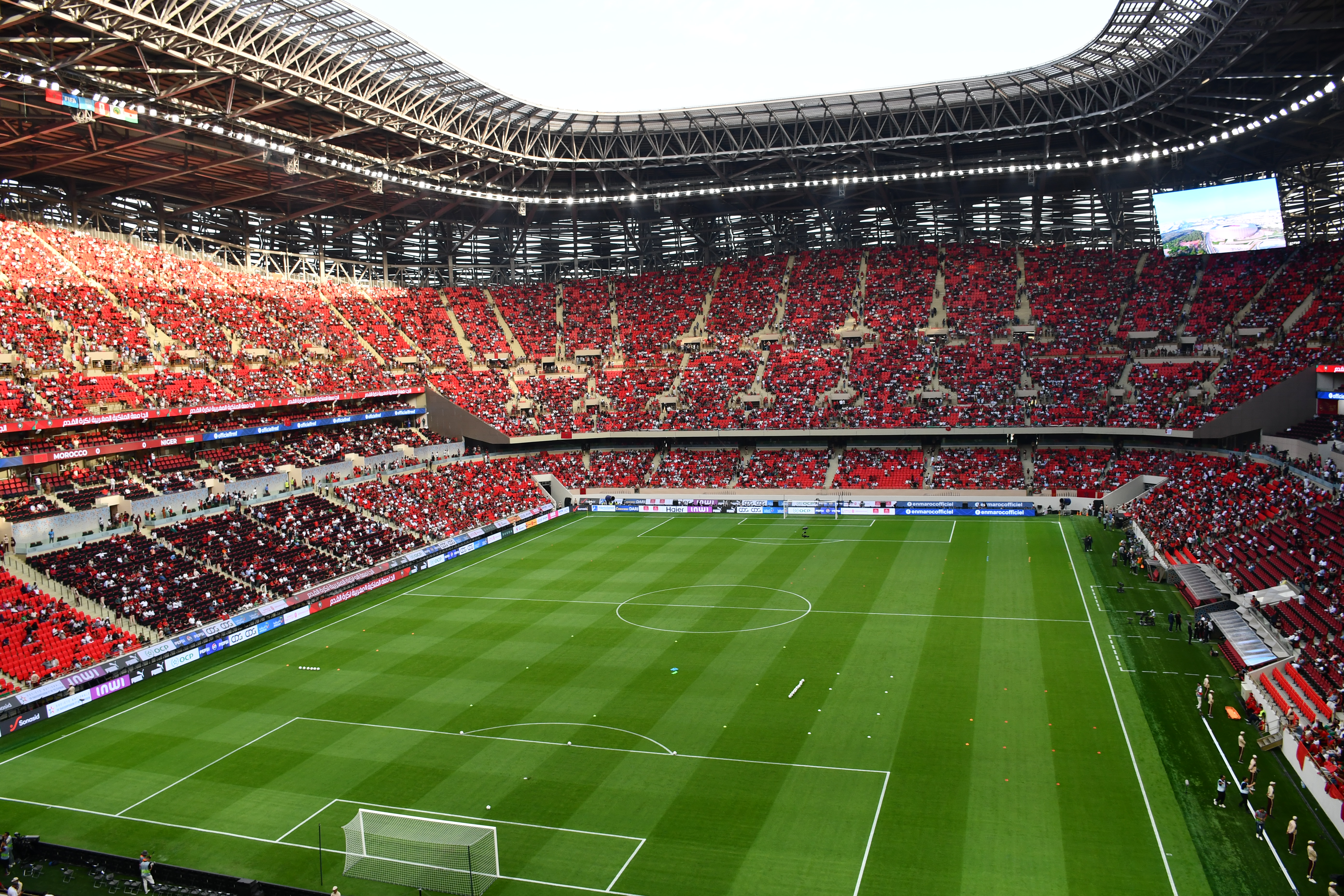
Prince Moulay Abdellah Stadium, Rabat

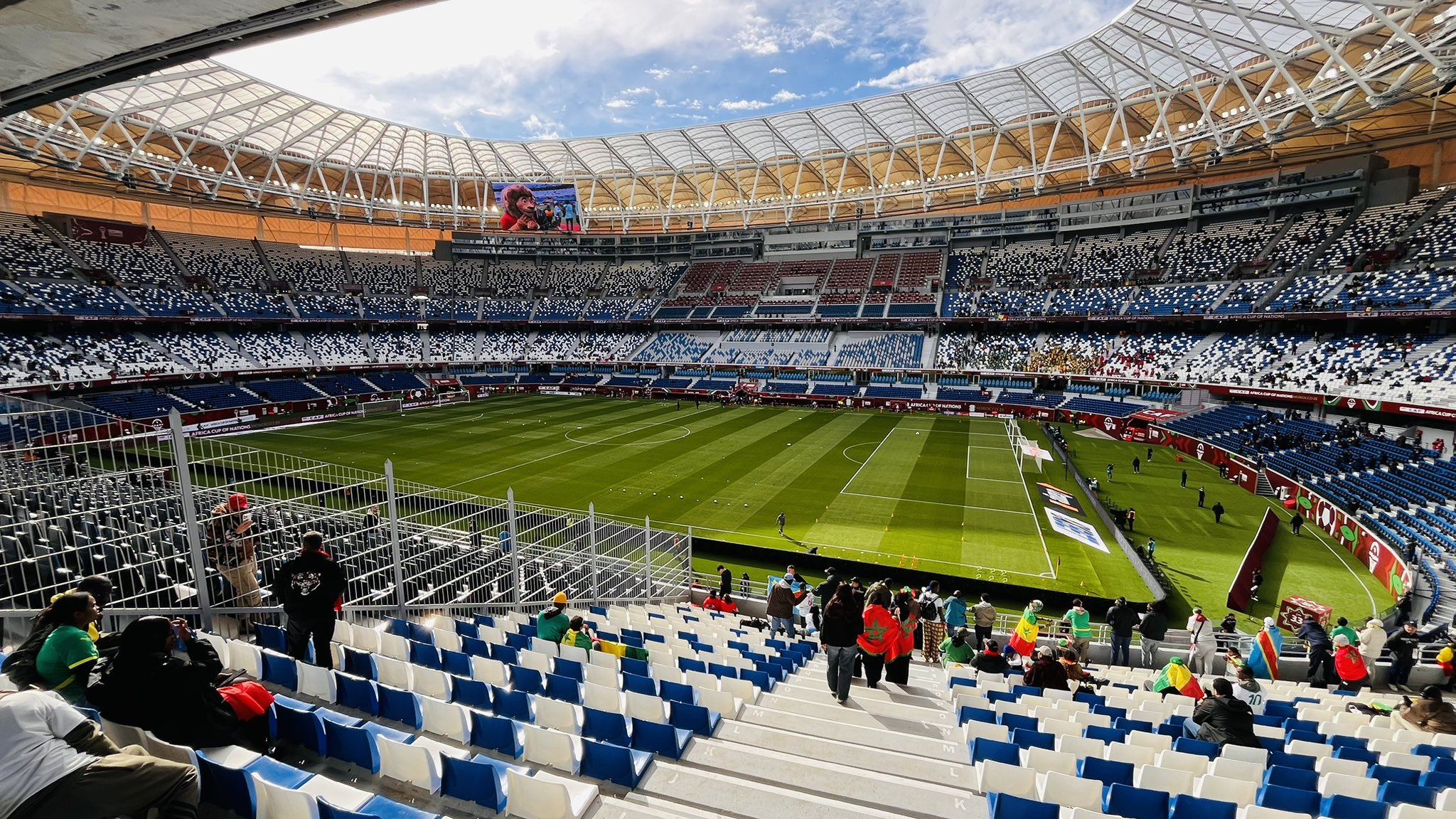
Ibn Batouta Stadium, Tangier

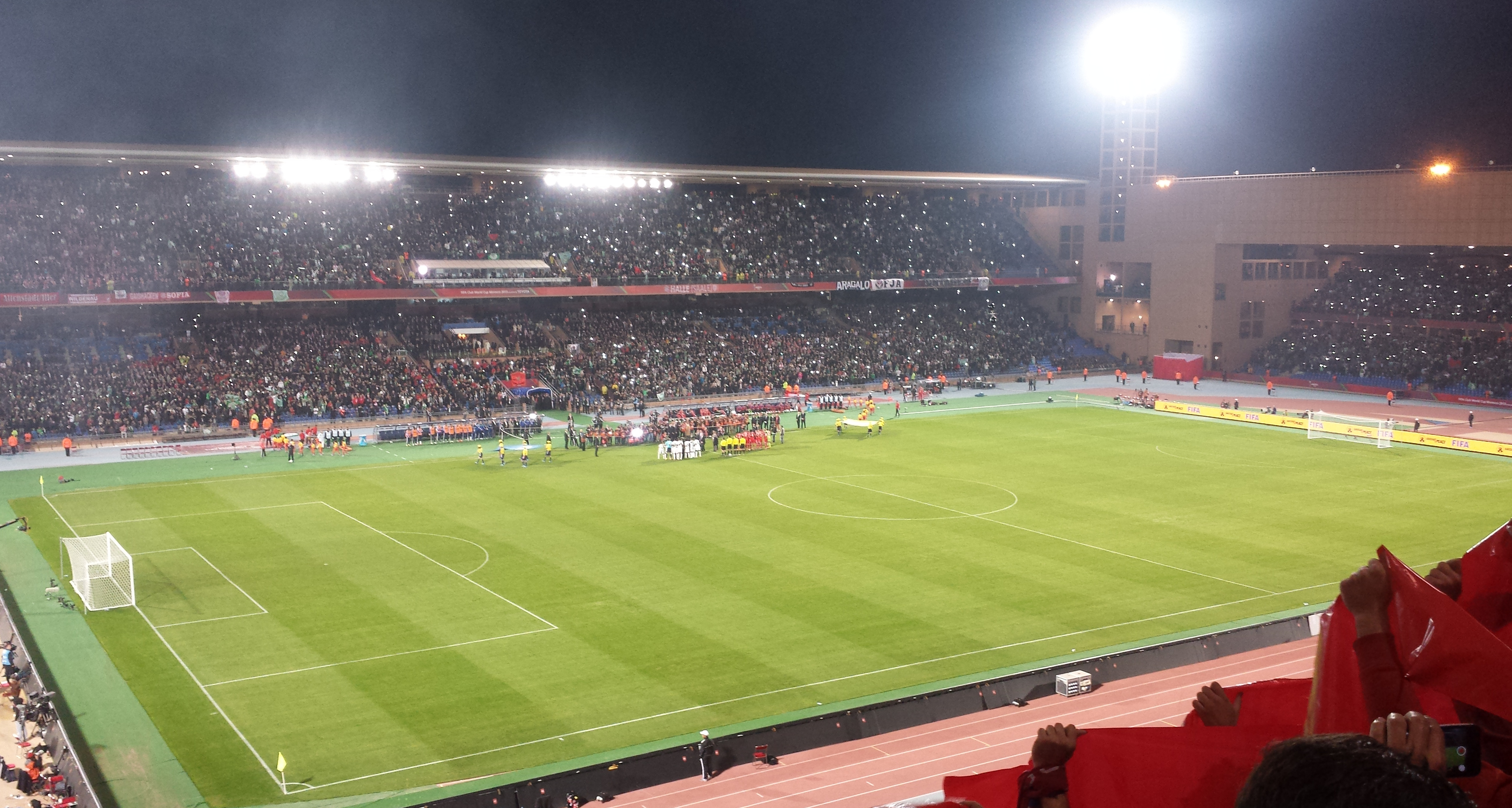
Marrakesh Stadium, Marrakesh

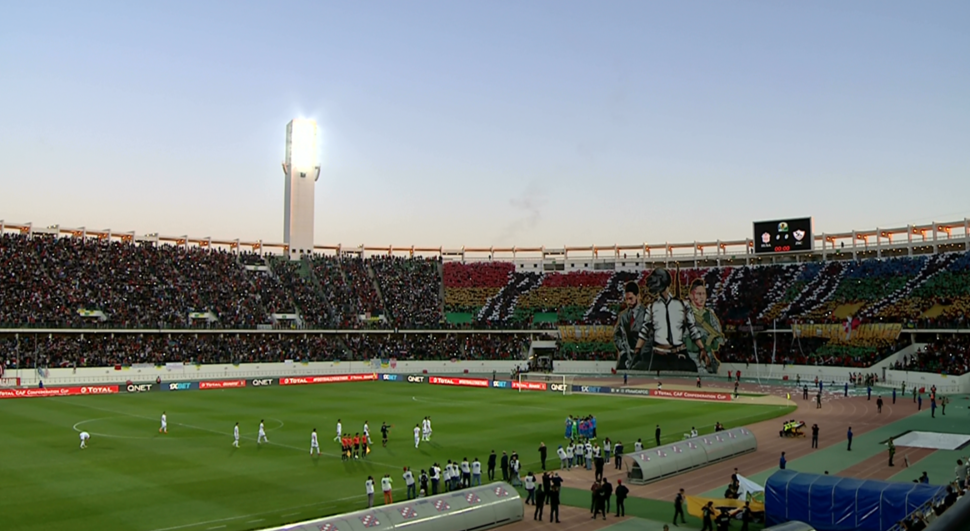
Adrar Stadium, Agadir

== Kit suppliers ==
Morocco's home colours are most red shirts and green shorts and socks. Away colours are usually all white or all green.

Kit provider	Period
(Germany) Adidas	1976–1993
(Italy) Lotto	1994–1997
(Germany) Puma	1998–2002
(United States) Nike	2003–2006
(Germany) Puma	2007–2011
(Germany) Adidas	2012–2019
(Germany) Puma	2019–present

== Results and fixtures ==
The following is a list of match results in the last 12 months, as well as any future matches that have been scheduled.

Win Draw Loss Fixture

=== 2025 ===
14 November Friendly	Morocco	1–0	Mozambique	Tangier, Morocco
20:00 UTC+1	Ounahi 7'	Report		Stadium: Ibn Batouta Stadium; Attendance: 60,000; Referee: Moussa Diou (Mauritania)

18 November Friendly	Morocco	4–0	Uganda	Tangier, Morocco
20:00 UTC+1	Achai 4' (o.g.); Saibari 33'; Rahimi 79' (pen.); El Khannouss 88'	Report		Stadium: Ibn Batouta Stadium; Referee: Ousmane Diakate (Mali)

2 December 2025 FIFA Arab Cup GS	Morocco	3–1	Comoros	Al Rayyan, Qatar
15:00 UTC+3	Bouftini 5'; Tissoudali 11'; El Berkaoui 45+4'	Report	Boulacsoute 56' (o.g.)	Stadium: Khalifa International Stadium; Attendance: 10,246; Referee: Ma Ning (China)

5 December 2025 FIFA Arab Cup GS	Oman	0–0	Morocco	Al Rayyan, Qatar
17:30 UTC+3		Report		Stadium: Education City Stadium; Attendance: 37,996; Referee: Juan Gabriel Benítez (Paraguay)

8 December 2025 FIFA Arab Cup GS	Morocco	1–0	Saudi Arabia	Lusail, Qatar
20:00 UTC+3	El Berkaoui 11'	Report		Stadium: Lusail Stadium; Attendance: 78,131; Referee: Mario Escobar (Guatemala)

11 December 2025 FIFA Arab Cup QF	Morocco	1–0	Syria	Al Rayyan, Qatar
17:30 UTC+3	Azaro 79'	Report		Stadium: Khalifa International Stadium; Attendance: 39,167; Referee: Cristián Garay (Chile)

15 December 2025 FIFA Arab Cup SF	Morocco	3–0	United Arab Emirates	Al Rayyan, Qatar
17:30 UTC+3	El Berkaoui 28'; El Mahdioui 83'; Hamdallah 90+2'	Report		Stadium: Khalifa International Stadium; Attendance: 33,898; Referee: Espen Eskås (Norway)

18 December 2025 FIFA Arab Cup final	Jordan	2–3 (a.e.t.)	Morocco	Lusail, Qatar
19:00 UTC+3	Olwan 48', 68' (pen.)	Report	Tannane 4'; Hamdallah 88', 100'	Stadium: Lusail Stadium; Attendance: 84,517; Referee: Glenn Nyberg (Sweden)

21 December 2025 AFCON GS	Morocco	2–0	Comoros	Rabat, Morocco
20:00 UTC+1	Brahim 55'; El Kaabi 74'	Report		Stadium: Prince Moulay Abdellah Stadium; Attendance: 60,180; Referee: Jean-Jacques Ndala (DR Congo)

26 December 2025 AFCON GS	Morocco	1–1	Mali	Rabat, Morocco
21:00 UTC+1	Brahim 45+5' (pen.)	Report	Sinayoko 64' (pen.)	Stadium: Prince Moulay Abdellah Stadium; Attendance: 63,844; Referee: Abdou Mefire (Cameroon)

29 December 2025 AFCON GS	Zambia	0–3	Morocco	Rabat, Morocco
20:00 UTC+1		Report	El Kaabi 9', 50'; Brahim 27'	Stadium: Prince Moulay Abdellah Stadium; Referee: Issa Sy (Senegal)

=== 2026 ===
4 January 2025 AFCON R16	Morocco	1–0	Tanzania	Rabat, Morocco
17:00 UTC+1	Brahim 64'	Report		Stadium: Prince Moulay Abdellah Stadium; Attendance: 63,894; Referee: Boubou Traore (Mali)

9 January 2025 AFCON QF	Cameroon	0–2	Morocco	Rabat, Morocco
20:00 UTC+1		Report	Brahim 26'; Saibari 74'	Stadium: Prince Moulay Abdellah Stadium; Attendance: 64,178; Referee: Dahane Beida (Mauritania)

14 January 2025 AFCON SF	Nigeria	0–0 (a.e.t.) (2–4 p)	Morocco	Rabat, Morocco
21:00 UTC+1		Report		Stadium: Prince Moulay Abdellah Stadium; Attendance: 65,458; Referee: Daniel Nii Laryea (Ghana)
	Penalties
	Onuachu (penalty scored); Chukwueze (penalty missed); Dele-Bashiru (penalty scored); Onyemaechi (penalty missed)		(penalty scored) El Aynaoui; (penalty missed) Igamane; (penalty scored) Ben Seghir; (penalty scored) Hakimi; (penalty scored) En-Nesyri

18 January 2025 AFCON final	Senegal	0–3; Awarded (Note: The final match originally finished 1–0 for Senegal after extra time. On 17 March 2026, the CAF Appeal Board ruled that Senegal had forfeited the match for temporarily refusing to play and leaving the pitch in protest of a refereeing decision. Pursuant to articles 82 and 84 of the competition regulations, the final was awarded as a 3–0 win for Morocco, thereby retroactively declaring them as 2025 Africa Cup of Nations champions and stripping Senegal of the title. The following day, the Senegalese Football Federation announced it would appeal the decision to the Court of Arbitration for Sport.)	Morocco	Rabat, Morocco
20:00 UTC+1	P. Gueye 94'	Report		Stadium: Prince Moulay Abdellah Stadium; Attendance: 66,526; Referee: Jean-Jacques Ndala (DR Congo)

27 March Friendly	Morocco	1–1	Ecuador	Madrid, Spain
20:15 UTC+1	El Aynaoui 88'	Report	Yeboah 48'	Stadium: Metropolitano Stadium; Attendance: 61,622; Referee: José Luis Munuera Montero (Spain)

31 March Friendly	Morocco	2–1	Paraguay	Lens, France
19:00 UTC+1	El Khannouss 48'; El Aynaoui 53'	Report	Caballero 88'	Stadium: Stade Bollaert-Delelis; Attendance: 38,000; Referee: Eric Wattellier (France)

26 May Friendly	Morocco	5–0	Burundi	Salé, Morocco
18:00 UTC+1	El Kaabi 59', 63'; Bentayeb 71'; Benjdida 80', 90'	Report		Stadium: Mohammed VI Football Complexe; Attendance: 0 (behind closed doors)

2 June Friendly	Morocco	4–0	Madagascar	Rabat, Morocco
18:00 UTC+1	Saibari 4', 25'; Rahimi 78' (pen.); El Kaabi 87'	Report		Stadium: Prince Moulay Abdellah Stadium; Referee: Boubou Traoré (Mali)

7 June Friendly	Morocco	1–1	Norway	Harrison, New Jersey, United States
15:00 UTC−4	Brahim 8'	Report	Ødegaard 75'	Stadium: Sports Illustrated Stadium; Attendance: 25,000; Referee: Pierre-Luc Lauzière (Canada)

13 June 2026 FIFA World Cup GS	Brazil	1–1	Morocco	East Rutherford, New Jersey, United States
18:00 UTC−4	Vinícius 32'	Report	Saibari 21'	Stadium: MetLife Stadium; Attendance: 80,663; Referee: Slavko Vinčić (Slovenia)

19 June 2026 FIFA World Cup GS	Scotland	0–1	Morocco	Foxborough, Massachusetts, United States
18:00 UTC−4		Report	Saibari 2'	Stadium: Gillette Stadium; Attendance: 64,146; Referee: Ilgiz Tantashev (Uzbekistan)

24 June 2026 FIFA World Cup GS	Morocco	4–2	Haiti	Atlanta, Georgia, United States
18:00 UTC−4	Hakimi 39'; Saibari 45+1'; Rahimi 78'; Yassine 89'	Report	Bounou 10' (o.g.); Isidor 43'	Stadium: Mercedes-Benz Stadium; Attendance: 68,239; Referee: Danny Makkelie (Netherlands)

29 June 2026 FIFA World Cup R32	Netherlands	1–1 (a.e.t.) (2–3 p)	Morocco	Guadalupe, Nuevo León, Mexico
19:00 UTC−6	Gakpo 72'	Report	Diop 90+1'	Stadium: Estadio BBVA; Attendance: 51,243; Referee: Wilton Sampaio (Brazil)
	Penalties
	Koopmeiners (penalty scored); Kluivert (penalty missed); Weghorst (penalty scored); Timber (penalty missed); Summerville (penalty missed)		(penalty missed) El Aynaoui; (penalty scored) Rahimi; (penalty scored) Talbi; (penalty missed) Hakimi; (penalty scored) Saibari

4 July 2026 FIFA World Cup R16	Canada	0–3	Morocco	Houston, Texas, United States
12:00 UTC−5		Report	Ounahi 50', 82'; Rahimi 90+8'	Stadium: NRG Stadium; Attendance: 68,777; Referee: Michael Oliver (England)

9 July 2026 FIFA World Cup QF	France	2–0	Morocco	Foxborough, Massachusetts, United States
16:00 UTC−4	Mbappé 60'; Dembélé 66'	Report		Stadium: Gillette Stadium; Attendance: 63,881; Referee: Facundo Tello (Argentina)

25 September 2027 AFCON qualification	Morocco	2–0	Gabon	Rabat, Morocco
19:00 UTC+0	Mazraoui 36'; Rahimi 84'	Report		Stadium: Prince Moulay Abdellah Stadium; Referee: Abongile Tom (South Africa)

29 September 2027 AFCON qualification	Lesotho	0–2	Morocco	Bloemfontein, South Africa (Note: Lesotho played their home qualifier outside the country, as no stadium in Lesotho met CAF requirements.)
15:00 UTC+2		Report	Brahim 45'; Ounahi 82'	Stadium: Toyota Stadium; Referee: Abdou Abdel Mefire (Cameroon)

4 October Friendly	Morocco	1–1	Mali	Tangier, Morocco
18:00 UTC+0	Ezzalzouli 35' (pen.)	Report	G. Diarra 77'	Stadium: Tangier Grand Stadium; Attendance: 65,079; Referee: Abdel Aziz Bouh (Mauritania)

13 November 2027 AFCON qualification	Morocco	5–1	Niger	Casablanca, Morocco
20:00 UTC+0	Zabiri 4'; Hakimi 27', 45+3'; En-Nesyri 77'; Oufkir 90'	Report	Abdouramane 41'	Stadium: Stade Mohammed V Attendance: 45,891; Referee: Omar Artan (Somalia)

17 November 2027 AFCON qualification	Niger	0–1	Morocco	Rabat, Morocco
20:00 UTC+0		Report	Ouazane 22'	Stadium: Stade Prince Moulay Abdallah; Referee: Tewodros Mitiku (Ethiopia)

=== 2027 ===
24 March 2027 AFCON qualification	Morocco	v	Lesotho	TBD, Morocco
TBD				Stadium: TBD

28 March 2027 AFCON qualification	Gabon	v	Morocco	TBD, Gabon
TBD				Stadium: TBD

== Coaching staff ==
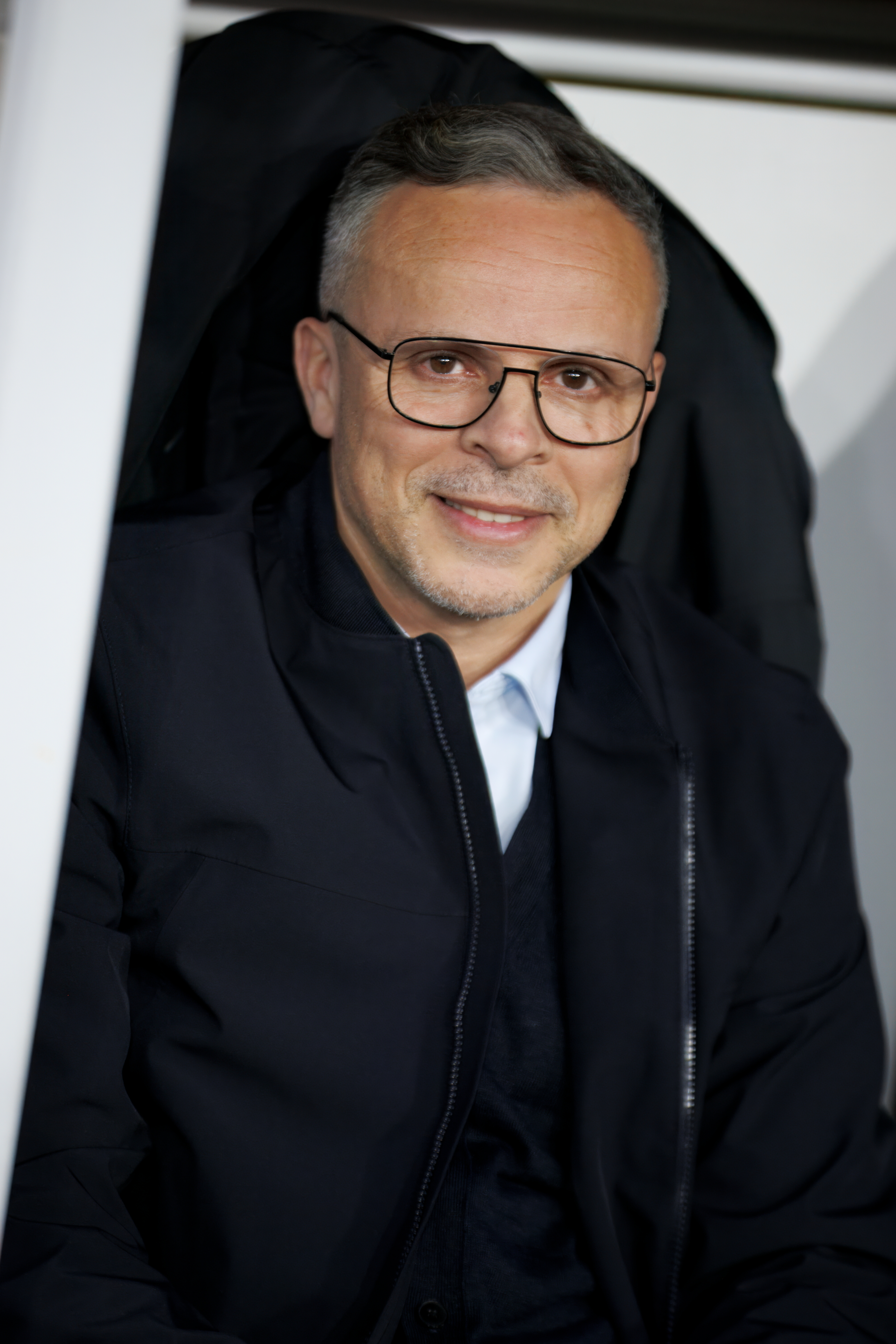
Current head coach Mohamed Ouahbi

Position	Name
Head coach	(Morocco) Mohamed Ouahbi
Assistant coach(es)	(Portugal) João Sacramento
Assistant coach(es)	(Morocco) Youssouf Hadji
Goalkeeping coach	(Morocco) Slimane Ben Houcine
Fitness coach	(Morocco) Oussama Bentalib
Video analyst	(Morocco) Ayman Makroud
Technical directors	(Morocco) Abdelilah Moussaoui
Technical directors	(Morocco) Fathi Jamal

=== Coaching history ===
As of 5 March 2026

Managers
Name	Nationality	Years as manager	Trophy won	World Cup	Africa Cup
Larbi Benbarek	(Morocco)	1957	–	–	–
Mohammed Khamirib & Abdelkader Lokhmiri	(Morocco)	1959	–	–	–
Larbi Benbarek	(Morocco)	1960	–	–	–
Mohammed Massoun & Abderrahmane Mahjoub	(Morocco)	1961–1967	–	–	–
Guy Cluzeau & Abdellah Settati	(France) (Morocco)	1968–1969	–	–	–
Blagoja Vidinić	(Socialist Federal Republic of Yugoslavia)	1970	–	1970 (GS)	–
José Barinaga	(Spain)	1971–1972	–	–	1972 (GS)
Abderrahmane Mahjoub	(Morocco)	1972–1973	–	–	–
Virgil Mărdărescu	(Romania)	1974–1978	1976 African Cup of Nations	–	1976 (W) – 1978 (GS)
Just Fontaine	(France) (Morocco)	1979–1980	–	–	–
Jebrane & Yabram Hamidouch	(Morocco)	1980–1981	–	–	1980 (3RD)
Abdellah El-Ammari	(Morocco)	1982	–	–	–
Mehdi Faria	(Brazil)	1983–1988	–	1986 (R16)	1986 (4TH) – 1988 (4TH)
Antonio Valentín	(Argentina)	1989–1990	–	–	–
Abdellah Ajri Blinda	(Morocco)	1990	–	–	–
Werner Olk	(Germany)	1990–1992	–	–	1992 (GS)
Mohamed Ellouzani	(Morocco)	1992–1994	–	–	–
Abdellah Ajri Blinda	(Morocco)	1993–1994	–	1994 (GS)	–
Mohammed Lamari	(Morocco)	1994	–	–	–
Henri Michel	(France)	1995–2000	–	1998 (GS)	1998 (QF) – 2000 (GS)
Humberto Coelho	(Portugal)	2000–2002	–	–	2002 (GS)
Badou Ezzaki	(Morocco)	2002–2005	–	–	2004 (F)
Mohamed Fakhir	(Morocco)	2006–2007	–	–	2006 (GS)
Henri Michel	(France)	2007–2008	–	–	2008 (GS)
Hassan Moumen	(Morocco)	2009–2010	–	–	–
Eric Gerets	(Belgium)	2010–2012	–	–	2012 (GS)
Rachid Taoussi	(Morocco)	2012–2013	–	–	2013 (GS)
Badou Ezzaki	(Morocco)	2014–2016	–	–	–
Hervé Renard	(France)	2016–2019	–	2018 (GS)	2017 (QF) – 2019 (R16)
Vahid Halilhodžić	(Bosnia and Herzegovina)	2019–2022	–	–	2021 (QF)
Walid Regragui	(Morocco)	2022–2026	2025 Africa Cup of Nations	2022 (4TH)	2023 (R16)
Mohamed Ouahbi	(Morocco)	2026–	–	–	–

== Players ==
=== Current squad ===
On 4 November 2026, the following players were selected for Morocco's 2027 Africa Cup of Nations qualification matches against Niger on 13 and 17 November.
Caps and goals are correct as of 17 November 2026, after the match against Niger.

No.	Pos.	Player	Date of birth (age)	Caps	Goals	Club
1	GK	Yassine Bounou (vice-captain)	5 April 1991 (age 35)	101	0	(Saudi Arabian Football Federation) Al-Hilal
12	GK	Munir Mohamedi	10 May 1989 (age 37)	52	0	(Royal Moroccan Football Federation) RS Berkane
22	GK	Ahmed Reda Tagnaouti	5 April 1996 (age 30)	3	0	(Royal Moroccan Football Federation) AS FAR
31	GK	Alaa Bellaarouch	1 February 2002 (age 24)	0	0	(Romanian Football Federation) Dinamo București
2	DF	Achraf Hakimi (captain)	4 November 1998 (age 28)	105	14	(French Football Federation) Paris Saint-Germain
3	DF	Noussair Mazraoui	14 November 1997 (age 29)	55	3	(The Football Association) Manchester United
5	DF	Nayef Aguerd	30 March 1996 (age 30)	68	2	(French Football Federation) Marseille
14	DF	Issa Diop	9 January 1997 (age 29)	13	1	(The Football Association) Ipswich Town
15	DF	Souffian El Karouani	19 October 2000 (age 26)	8	0	(Portuguese Football Federation) Benfica
25	DF	Redouane Halhal	5 March 2003 (age 23)	5	0	(Italian Football Federation) Venezia
26	DF	Anass Salah-Eddine	18 January 2002 (age 24)	15	0	(Hellenic Football Federation) Panathinaikos
27	DF	Abdelhamid Aït Boudlal	16 April 2006 (age 20)	3	0	(French Football Federation) Rennes
28	DF	Ali Maamar	23 March 2005 (age 21)	3	0	(Royal Belgian Football Association) Anderlecht
6	MF	Ayyoub Bouaddi	2 October 2007 (age 19)	12	0	(The Football Association) Manchester City
18	MF	Oussama Targhalline	20 May 2002 (age 24)	13	0	(Royal Dutch Football Association) Feyenoord
20	MF	Abdellah Ouazane	15 January 2009 (age 17)	3	0	(Royal Dutch Football Association) Ajax
23	MF	Bilal El Khannouss	10 May 2004 (age 22)	48	3	(German Football Association) Stuttgart
24	MF	Neil El Aynaoui	2 July 2001 (age 25)	25	2	(German Football Association) RB Leipzig
	MF	Amine Sbaï	5 November 2000 (age 26)	3	0	(French Football Federation) Angers
	MF	Reda Belahyane	1 June 2004 (age 22)	3	0	(Italian Football Federation) Lazio
10	FW	Brahim Díaz	3 August 1999 (age 27)	35	15	(Royal Spanish Football Federation) Real Madrid
16	FW	Gessime Yassine	22 November 2005 (age 21)	10	1	(French Football Federation) Strasbourg
17	FW	Abde Ezzalzouli	17 December 2001 (age 24)	41	3	(Royal Spanish Football Federation) Real Betis
19	FW	Youssef En-Nesyri	1 June 1997 (age 29)	94	26	(Saudi Arabian Football Federation) Al-Ittihad
21	FW	Yassir Zabiri	23 February 2005 (age 21)	3	1	(Royal Spanish Football Federation) Racing Santander
	FW	Ayoub Oufkir	4 January 2006 (age 20)	2	1	(Royal Dutch Football Association) AZ

=== Recent call-ups ===
The following players have also been called up for the team in the last twelve months.

Pos.	Player	Date of birth (age)	Caps	Goals	Club	Latest call-up
GK	El Mehdi Al Harrar	30 November 2000 (age 25)	0	0	(Morocco) Raja Casablanca	2026 FIFA World Cup ^{PRE}
GK	Yanis Benchaouch	10 April 2006 (age 20)	0	0	(France) Red Star	v. Burundi, 26 May 2026
GK	Ibrahim Gomis	20 March 2005 (age 21)	0	0	(France) Marseille B	v. Burundi, 26 May 2026
GK	Mehdi Benabid	24 January 1998 (age 28)	5	0	(Morocco) Wydad Casablanca	v. Paraguay, 31 March 2026
GK	Salaheddine Chihab	23 February 1993 (age 33)	1	0	(Morocco) MAS Fès	2025 FIFA Arab Cup
GK	Rachid Ghanimi	25 April 2001 (age 25)	0	0	(Morocco) Wydad Casablanca	2025 FIFA Arab Cup
DF	Marwane Saâdane	17 January 1992 (age 34)	9	0	(Saudi Arabia) Al-Fateh	v. Mali, 4 Oct 2026
DF	Zakaria El Ouahdi	31 December 2001 (age 24)	6	0	(Germany) Hamburger SV	v. Mali, 4 Oct 2026
DF	Youssef Belammari	20 September 1998 (age 28)	18	0	(Egypt) Al Ahly	2026 FIFA World Cup
DF	Chadi Riad	17 June 2003 (age 23)	10	1	(England) Crystal Palace	2026 FIFA World Cup
DF	Soufiane Bouftini	3 May 1994 (age 32)	14	3	(United Arab Emirates) Al Wasl	v. Burundi, 26 May 2026
DF	Mohamed Chibi	21 January 1993 (age 33)	11	1	(Egypt) Pyramids	v. Burundi, 26 May 2026
DF	Ismaël Baouf	17 September 2006 (age 20)	1	0	(Netherlands) Cambuur	v. Burundi, 26 May 2026
DF	Romain Saïss ^{RET}	26 March 1990 (age 36)	86	3	Unattached	2025 Africa Cup of Nations
DF	Jawad El Yamiq	29 February 1992 (age 34)	31	3	(Turkey) Eyüpspor	2025 Africa Cup of Nations
DF	Adam Masina	2 January 1994 (age 32)	29	0	Retired	2025 Africa Cup of Nations
DF	Hamza El Moussaoui	7 April 1993 (age 33)	12	1	(Morocco) RS Berkane	2025 FIFA Arab Cup
DF	Mohamed Boulacsoute	23 September 1998 (age 28)	6	0	(Morocco) Raja Casablanca	2025 FIFA Arab Cup
DF	Anas Bach	10 February 1998 (age 28)	5	0	(Morocco) AS FAR	2025 FIFA Arab Cup
DF	Mahmoud Bentayg	30 October 1999 (age 27)	4	0	(Egypt) Zamalek	2025 FIFA Arab Cup
DF	Marouane Louadni	21 December 1994 (age 31)	4	0	(Morocco) AS FAR	2025 FIFA Arab Cup
DF	Mohamed Moufid	12 January 2000 (age 26)	3	0	(Morocco) Wydad Casablanca	2025 FIFA Arab Cup
MF	Azzedine Ounahi	19 April 2000 (age 26)	58	12	(Greece) Panathinaikos	v. Mali, 4 Oct 2026
MF	Ismael Saibari	28 January 2001 (age 25)	37	12	(Germany) Bayern Munich	v. Mali, 4 Oct 2026
MF	Samir El Mourabet	6 August 2006 (age 20)	9	0	(France) Strasbourg	v. Mali, 4 Oct 2026
MF	Soufiane El-Faouzi	13 July 2002 (age 24)	1	0	(Germany) Schalke 04	v. Mali, 4 Oct 2026
MF	Sofyan Amrabat	21 August 1996 (age 30)	78	0	(Netherlands) Ajax	2026 FIFA World Cup
MF	Chemsdine Talbi	9 May 2005 (age 21)	10	0	(England) Sunderland	2026 FIFA World Cup
MF	Sofiane Boufal	17 September 1993 (age 33)	47	8	(Libya) Al-Ittihad Tripoli	v. Burundi, 26 May 2026
MF	Imrân Louza	1 May 1999 (age 27)	16	2	(Greece) Panathinaikos	v. Burundi, 26 May 2026
MF	Rayane Bounida	3 March 2006 (age 20)	1	0	(Netherlands) Ajax	v. Burundi, 26 May 2026
MF	Mohamed Rabie Hrimat	17 August 1994 (age 32)	8	0	(Qatar) Al-Shamal	v. Paraguay, 31 March 2026
MF	Walid El Karti	23 July 1994 (age 32)	25	3	(Egypt) Pyramids	2025 FIFA Arab Cup
MF	Oussama Tannane	23 March 1994 (age 32)	15	3	(Qatar) Al-Arabi	2025 FIFA Arab Cup
MF	Sabir Bougrine	10 July 1996 (age 30)	9	2	(Morocco) KAC Marrakech	2025 FIFA Arab Cup
MF	Amin Zahzouh	11 August 2000 (age 26)	7	0	(Qatar) Al-Wakrah	2025 FIFA Arab Cup
MF	Aschraf El Mahdioui	24 May 1996 (age 30)	6	1	(Saudi Arabia) Al-Taawoun	2025 FIFA Arab Cup
FW	Soufiane Rahimi	2 June 1996 (age 30)	35	9 (Note: Rahimi additionally scored 6 goals in 10 matches with the Morocco A' national team (5 in African Nations Championship and 1 in FIFA Arab Cup). Although these are official tournaments, they did not feature Morocco's senior national team (Tier A); therefore, these appearances and goals are recorded under the "B-team" or reserve team category.)	(United Arab Emirates) Al Ain	v. Mali, 4 Oct 2026
FW	Ilias Akhomach	16 April 2004 (age 22)	14	0	(Spain) Villarreal	v. Mali, 4 Oct 2026
FW	Tawfik Bentayeb	14 January 2002 (age 24)	2	0	(Belgium) Anderlecht	v. Mali, 4 Oct 2026
FW	Ayoub El Kaabi	25 June 1993 (age 33)	60	23 (Note: El Kaabi scored 12 goals in 12 African Nations Championship matches. Although this was with the local national team it's still an official FIFA tournament and should be counted. FIFA was crystal clear about this subject when it made available its unbeaten runs in men’s international football history list)	(Greece) Olympiacos	2026 FIFA World Cup
FW	Ayoube Amaimouni	30 November 2004 (age 21)	4	0	(Germany) Eintracht Frankfurt	2026 FIFA World Cup
FW	Soufiane Benjdida	5 September 2001 (age 25)	1	2	(Egypt) Al Ahly	v. Burundi, 26 May 2026
FW	Othmane Maamma	6 October 2005 (age 21)	1	0	(England) Watford	v. Burundi, 26 May 2026
FW	Yanis Begraoui	4 July 2001 (age 25)	0	0	(Portugal) Estoril Praia	v. Burundi, 26 May 2026
FW	Amine Adli	10 May 2000 (age 26)	17	1	(England) Bournemouth	v. Paraguay, 31 March 2026
FW	Eliesse Ben Seghir	16 February 2005 (age 21)	20	3	(Germany) Bayer Leverkusen	2025 Africa Cup of Nations
FW	Hamza Igamane	2 November 2002 (age 24)	10	2	(France) Lille	2025 Africa Cup of Nations
FW	Abderrazak Hamdallah ^{RET}	17 December 1990 (age 35)	29	10	(Saudi Arabia) Al-Taawoun	2025 FIFA Arab Cup
FW	Tarik Tissoudali	2 April 1993 (age 33)	15	3	(United Arab Emirates) Khor Fakkan	2025 FIFA Arab Cup
FW	Walid Azaro	11 June 1995 (age 31)	10	1	(United Arab Emirates) Ajman	2025 FIFA Arab Cup
FW	Karim El Berkaoui	29 March 1995 (age 31)	6	3	Unattached	2025 FIFA Arab Cup
FW	Mounir Chouiar	23 January 1999 (age 27)	2	0	(Morocco) RS Berkane	2025 FIFA Arab Cup
FW	Hamza Hannouri	22 January 1998 (age 28)	0	0	(Morocco) Wydad Casablanca	2025 FIFA Arab Cup
FW	Achraf Bencharki	24 September 1994 (age 32)	10	0	(Egypt) Al Ahly	2025 FIFA Arab Cup ^{INJ}
FW	Youssef Mehri	7 September 1999 (age 27)	0	0	(Morocco) RS Berkane	2025 FIFA Arab Cup ^{WD}
FW	Sofiane Diop	9 June 2000 (age 26)	1	0	(France) Nice	v. Uganda, 18 November 2025
^{DEC} Player declined the call-up to the squad^{INJ} Did not make it to the current squad due to injury^{PRE} Preliminary squad / standby^{RET} Player retired from internationals^{SUS} Player is suspended^{WD} Player withdrew from the roster for non-injury related reasons

=== Previous squads ===
Africa Cup of Nations squads
Squads
CAN 1972 squad
CAN 1976 squad
CAN 1978 squad
CAN 1980 squad
CAN 1986 squad
CAN 1988 squad
CAN 1992 squad
CAN 1998 squad
CAN 2000 squad
CAN 2002 squad
CAN 2004 squad
CAN 2006 squad
CAN 2008 squad
CAN 2012 squad
CAN 2013 squad
CAN 2017 squad
CAN 2019 squad
CAN 2021 squad
CAN 2023 squad
CAN 2025 squad

African Nations Championship squads
Squads
CHAN 2014 squad
CHAN 2016 squad
CHAN 2018 squad
CHAN 2020 squad
CHAN 2024 squad

FIFA World Cup squads
Squads
1970 FIFA World Cup squad
1986 FIFA World Cup squad
1994 FIFA World Cup squad
1998 FIFA World Cup squad
2018 FIFA World Cup squad
2022 FIFA World Cup squad
2026 FIFA World Cup squad

Summer Olympics squads
Squads
Olympics 1964 squad
Olympics 1972 squad
Olympics 1984 squad
Olympics 1992 squad
Olympics 2000 squad
Olympics 2004 squad
Olympics 2012 squad
Olympics 2024 squad

== Player records ==
As of 13 November 2026
Statistics include official FIFA-recognised matches only. (Note: Since 2014, African Nations Championship games have been considered official by FIFA.)
Players in bold are still active with Morocco.

=== Most appearances ===
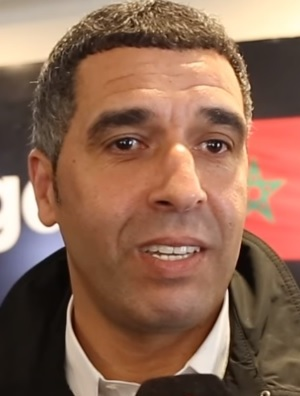
Noureddine Naybet is Morocco's most capped player with 115 appearances

Rank	Player	Caps	Goals	Career
1	Noureddine Naybet	115	4	1990–2006
2	**Achraf Hakimi**	104	14	2016–present
3	**Yassine Bounou**	100	0	2013–present
4	Ahmed Faras	94	36	1966–1980
5	**Youssef En-Nesyri**	93	26	2016–present
6	Romain Saïss	86	3	2012–2026
7	Houssine Kharja	79	13	2003–2015
7	Youssef Safri	79	9	1999–2009
9	**Sofyan Amrabat**	78	0	2017–present
9	Ezzaki Badou	78	0	1979–1992

=== Top goalscorers ===
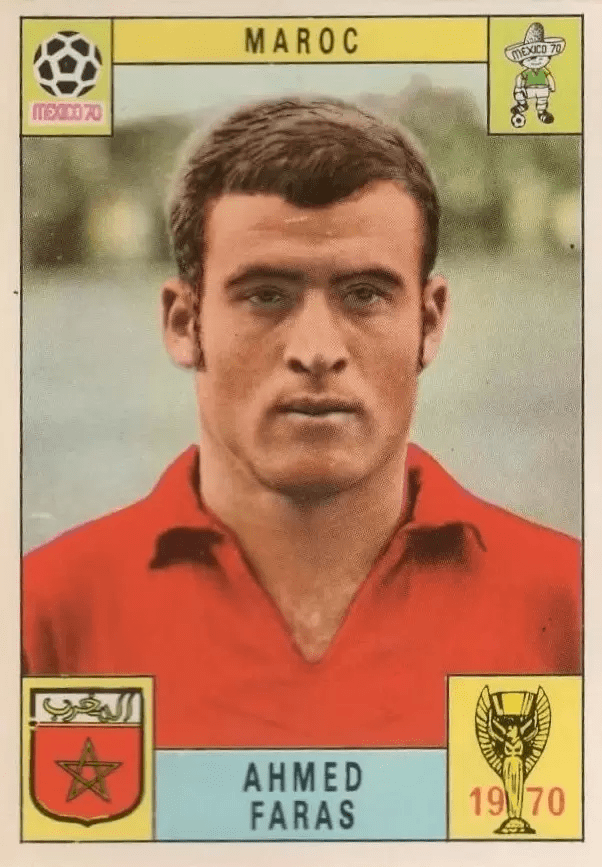
Ahmed Faras is Morocco's top scorer with 36 goals

Rank	Player	Goals	Caps	Ratio	Career
1	Ahmed Faras	36	94	0.38	1966–1980
2	**Ayoub El Kaabi**	33	72	0.38	2018–present
3	Salaheddine Bassir	27	59	0.46	1994–2002
4	**Youssef En-Nesyri**	26	93	0.28	2016–present
5	Hakim Ziyech	25	64	0.39	2015–2024
6	Abdeljalil Hadda	19	49	0.39	1995–2002
7	Hassan Amcharrat	18	39	0.46	1971–1979
7	Marouane Chamakh	18	65	0.28	2003–2014
9	Abdeslam Laghrissi	17	35	0.49	1984–1995
10	Youssef El-Arabi	16	47	0.34	2010–2021
10	Youssouf Hadji	16	64	0.25	2003–2012

== Competitive record ==
=== FIFA World Cup ===
Morocco's national football team has participated in the World Cup seven times. Their best performance was in the 2022 tournament where they finished in fourth place, becoming the first African nation to reach the semi-finals of the tournament.

FIFA World Cup record									FIFA World Cup qualification record					
Year	Round	Position	Pld	W	D	L	GF	GA	Pld	W	D	L	GF	GA
(Uruguay) 1930	Not affiliated								Not affiliated					
(Italy) 1934	Not affiliated								Not affiliated					
(France) 1938	Not affiliated								Not affiliated					
(Brazil) 1950	Not affiliated								Not affiliated					
(Switzerland) 1954	Not affiliated								Not affiliated					
(Sweden) 1958	Not affiliated								Not affiliated					
(Chile) 1962	Did not qualify								7	2	2	3	7	8
(England) 1966	Withdrew								Withdrew					
(Mexico) 1970	Group stage	14th	3	0	1	2	2	6	10	4	4	2	11	7
(West Germany) 1974	Did not qualify								10	4	3	3	12	13
(Argentina) 1978	Did not qualify								2	0	2	0	2	2
(Spain) 1982	Did not qualify								8	3	2	3	5	6
(Mexico) 1986	Round of 16	11th	4	1	2	1	3	2	8	5	2	1	12	1
(Italy) 1990	Did not qualify								6	1	3	2	4	5
(United States) 1994	Group stage	23rd	3	0	0	3	2	5	10	7	2	1	19	4
(France) 1998	Group stage	18th	3	1	1	1	5	5	6	5	1	0	14	2
(South Korea) (Japan) 2002	Did not qualify								10	6	3	1	11	3
(Germany) 2006	Did not qualify								10	5	5	0	17	7
(South Africa) 2010	Did not qualify								10	3	3	4	14	13
(Brazil) 2014	Did not qualify								6	2	3	1	9	8
(Russia) 2018	Group stage	27th	3	0	1	2	2	4	8	4	3	1	13	1
(Qatar) 2022	Fourth place	4th	7	3	2	2	6	5	8	7	1	0	25	3
(Canada) (Mexico) (United States) 2026	Quarter-finals	7th	6	3	2	1	10	6	8	8	0	0	22	2
(Morocco) (Portugal) (Spain) 2030	Qualified as co-hosts								Qualified as co-hosts					
(Saudi Arabia) 2034	To be determined								To be determined					
Total: 8/24	Fourth place		29	8	9	12	30	33	127	66	39	22	197	85

=== Africa Cup of Nations ===
Africa Cup of Nations record									Africa Cup of Nations qualification record					
Year	Round	Position	Pld	W	D	L	GF	GA	Pld	W	D	L	GF	GA
(Sudan) 1957	Not affiliated to CAF								Not affiliated to CAF					
(United Arab Republic) 1959	Not affiliated to CAF								Not affiliated to CAF					
(Ethiopia) 1962	Did not qualify								Withdrew					
(Ghana) 1963	Did not qualify								2	1	0	1	5	6
(Tunisia) 1965	Did not enter								Did not enter					
(Ethiopia) 1968	Did not enter								Did not enter					
(Sudan) 1970	Did not qualify								2	1	0	1	1	2
(Cameroon) 1972	Group stage	5th	3	0	3	0	3	3	4	2	0	2	9	6
(Egypt) 1974	Did not enter								Did not enter					
(Ethiopia) 1976	Champions	1st	6	4	2	0	11	6	6	4	0	2	13	4
(Ghana) 1978	Group stage	6th	3	1	1	1	2	4	Qualified as defending champions					
(Nigeria) 1980	Third place	3rd	5	2	1	2	4	3	4	2	1	1	14	5
(Libya) 1982	Did not qualify								4	3	0	1	8	4
(Ivory Coast) 1984	Did not qualify								4	1	2	1	4	2
(Egypt) 1986	Fourth place	4th	5	1	2	2	4	5	2	1	1	0	1	0
(Morocco) 1988	Fourth place	4th	5	1	3	1	3	3	Qualified as hosts					
(Algeria) 1990	Did not qualify								2	0	2	0	1	1
(Senegal) 1992	Group stage	9th	2	0	1	1	1	2	6	4	0	2	11	4
(Tunisia) 1994	Did not qualify								6	2	2	2	5	4
(South Africa) 1996	Did not qualify								4	1	1	2	2	4
(Burkina Faso) 1998	Quarter-finals	6th	4	2	1	1	6	3	6	4	2	0	10	1
(Ghana) (Nigeria) 2000	Group stage	11th	3	1	1	1	1	2	4	2	2	0	6	4
(Mali) 2002	Group stage	9th	3	1	1	1	3	4	6	3	1	2	5	4
(Tunisia) 2004	Runners-up	2nd	6	4	1	1	14	4	6	5	1	0	10	0
(Egypt) 2006	Group stage	13th	3	0	2	1	0	1	10	5	5	0	17	7
(Ghana) 2008	Group stage	11th	3	1	0	2	7	6	4	3	1	0	6	1
(Angola) 2010	Did not qualify								10	3	3	4	14	13
(Equatorial Guinea) (Gabon) 2012	Group stage	12th	3	1	0	2	4	5	6	3	2	1	8	2
(South Africa) 2013	Group stage	10th	3	0	3	0	3	3	2	1	0	1	4	2
(Equatorial Guinea) 2015	Disqualified								Originally qualified as hosts, then disqualified					
(Gabon) 2017	Quarter-finals	7th	4	2	0	2	4	3	6	5	1	0	10	1
(Egypt) 2019	Round of 16	9th	4	3	1	0	4	1	6	3	2	1	8	3
(Cameroon) 2021	Quarter-finals	5th	5	3	1	1	8	5	6	4	2	0	10	1
(Ivory Coast) 2023	Round of 16	11th	4	2	1	1	5	3	4	3	0	1	8	3
(Morocco) 2025	Champions	1st	7	5	2	0	12	1	6	6	0	0	26	2
(Kenya) (Tanzania) (Uganda) 2027	To be determined								To be determined					
Total: 20/35	2 Titles		81	34	27	20	99	67	128	72	31	25	216	86

=== African Nations Championship ===
African Nations Championship record									African Nations Championship qualification record					
Year	Round	Position	Pld	W	D	L	GF	GA	Pld	W	D	L	GF	GA
(Ivory Coast) 2009	Did not qualify								4	1	2	1	5	6
(Sudan) 2011	Did not qualify								2	0	2	0	3	3
(South Africa) 2014	Quarter-finals	8th	4	1	2	1	7	6	2	1	1	0	1	0
(Rwanda) 2016	Group stage	10th	3	1	1	1	4	2	4	3	1	0	11	3
(Morocco) 2018	Champions	1st	6	5	1	0	16	2	2	1	1	0	4	2
(Cameroon) 2020	Champions	1st	6	5	1	0	15	3	2	1	1	0	3	0
(Algeria) 2022	Qualified, but were unable to participate due to diplomatic disputes.								Qualified automatically					
(Kenya) (Tanzania) (Uganda) 2024	Champions	1st	7	5	1	1	13	6	Qualified by default					
Total: 5/8	3 Titles		26	17	6	3	55	19	16	7	8	1	27	14

=== Olympic Games ===
Summer Olympics
Year	Round	Position	Pld	W	D	L	GF	GA
1896–1956	Not affiliated							
(Italy) 1960	Did not qualify							
(Japan) 1964	Round 1	13th	2	0	0	2	1	9
(Mexico) 1968	Qualified, but withdrew							
(West Germany) 1972	Round 2	8th	6	1	1	4	7	14
(Canada) 1976	Did not qualify							
(Soviet Union) 1980	Did not qualify							
(United States) 1984	Round 1	12th	3	1	0	2	1	4
(South Korea) 1988	Did not qualify							
Since 1992	See Morocco national under-23 football team							
Total	Round 2	7/26	23	3	5	15	17	48

- Football at the Summer Olympics has been an under-23 tournament since the 1992 edition.

=== African Games ===
African Games
Year	Round	Position	Pld	W	D	L	GF	GA
(Republic of the Congo) 1965	Did not enter							
(Nigeria) 1973	Did not enter							
(Algeria) 1978	Did not enter							
(Kenya) 1987	Did not enter							
Since 1991	See Morocco national under-23 football team or Morocco national under-20 football team							
Total	None		0	0	0	0	0	0

- Prior to the Cairo 1991 campaign, the Football at the All-Africa Games was open to full senior national teams.

=== Mediterranean Games ===
1951 to 1987 senior teams, from 1991 youth teams.

Mediterranean Games
Year	Round	Position	Pld	W	D	L	GF	GA
(Egypt) 1951	Did not enter							
(Spain) 1955	Did not enter							
(Lebanon) 1959	Did not enter							
(Italy) 1963	Fourth place	4th	4	2	0	2	4	6
(Tunisia) 1967	Group stage	7th	3	1	0	2	4	6
(Turkey) 1971	Disqualified							
(Algeria) 1975	Fourth place	4th	5	1	4	0	3	2
(Socialist Federal Republic of Yugoslavia) 1979	Group stage	6th	3	0	2	1	2	3
(Morocco) 1983	Gold Medal	1st	4	3	1	0	8	2
(Syria) 1987	Group stage	5th	3	1	1	1	2	2
Since 1991	See Morocco national under-23 football team or Morocco national under-20 football team							
Total	1 Title	7/10	22	8	8	6	23	21

=== Arab Games ===
Arab Games
Year	Round	Position	Pld	W	D	L	GF	GA
(Egypt) 1953	Did not enter							
(Lebanon) 1957	Fourth place	4th	4	2	2	0	12	6
(Morocco) 1961	Gold Medal	1st	5	5	0	0	26	6
(United Arab Republic) 1965	Did not enter							
(Syria) 1976	Gold Medal	1st	6	4	2	0	12	0
(Morocco) 1985	Silver Medal	2nd	5	3	1	1	9	3
(Syria) 1992	Did not enter							
(Lebanon) 1997	Did not enter							
(Jordan) 1999	Did not enter							
(Algeria) 2004	No football tournament							
(Egypt) 2007	Did not enter							
(Qatar) 2011	Did not enter							
Since 2023	See Morocco national under-23 football team or Morocco national under-20 football team							
Total	2 Titles	4/12	20	14	5	1	59	15

=== FIFA Arab Cup ===
FIFA Arab Cup
Year	Round	Position	Pld	W	D	L	GF	GA
(Lebanon) 1963	Did not participate							
(Kuwait) 1964	Did not participate							
(Iraq) 1966	Did not participate							
(Saudi Arabia) 1985	Did not participate							
(Jordan) 1988	Did not participate							
(Syria) 1992	Did not participate							
(Qatar) 1998	Group stage	5th	2	1	0	1	2	2
(Kuwait) 2002	Semi-finals	3rd	5	1	2	2	5	6
2009	Cancelled							
(Saudi Arabia) 2012	Champions	1st	5	4	1	0	11	2
(Qatar) 2021	Quarter-finals	5th	4	3	1	0	11	2
(Qatar) 2025	Champions	1st	6	5	1	0	11	3
(Qatar) 2029	To be determined							
(Qatar) 2033	To be determined							
Total	2 Titles	5/11	22	13	6	3	40	15

=== Minor tournaments ===
Year	Round	Position	Pld	W	D	L	GF	GA
(Tunisia) 1958 Djamila Bouhired Tournament	Third place	3rd	2	1	0	1	3	3
(Libya) 1964 Tripoli Fair Tournament	Third place	3rd	4	2	0	2	5	5
(Spain) 1965 World Military Cup	Third place	3rd	3	1	1	1	3	5
(Libya) 1965 Tripoli Fair Tournament	Third place	3rd	3	1	1	1	2	1
(Morocco) 1966 World Military Cup	Runners-up	2nd	3	0	1	2	1	4
(Libya) 1966 Tripoli Fair Tournament	Winners	1st	4	3	0	1	4	5
(Belgium) 1967 World Military Cup	Third place	3rd	-	-	-	-	-	-
(Syria) 1974 Kuneitra Cup	Winners	1st	7	6	1	0	16	5
(Malaysia) 1980 Merdeka Tournament	Winners	1st	8	5	2	1	15	7
(China) 1982 Beijing International Friendship Tournaments	Winners	1st	5	1	4	0	7	6
(India) 1985 Nehru Cup	Semi-finals	3rd	4	2	1	1	7	3
(South Korea) 1987 President's Cup Football Tournament	Group stage	6th	5	2	0	3	6	6
1988 Tournoi de France	Runners-up	2nd	2	1	0	1	4	3
(Italy) 1989 World Military Cup	Runners-up	2nd	3	1	1	1	3	4
(Morocco) 1993 World Military Cup	Runners-up	2nd	5	4	0	1	16	5
(United Arab Emirates) 1994 Friendship Tournament	Runners-up	2nd	3	1	2	0	4	3
(United Arab Emirates) 1996 Friendship Tournament	Runners-up	2nd	3	1	1	1	4	3
(Morocco) 1996 King Hassan II International Cup Tournament	Third place	3rd	2	1	1	0	4	2
(Morocco) 1998 King Hassan II International Cup Tournament	Third place	3rd	2	0	1	1	2	3
(Guinea) 1998 African Military Cup	Fourth place	4th	-	-	-	-	-	-
1999 LG Cup (Morocco)	Runners-up	2nd	2	1	0	1	2	2
(Morocco) 2000 King Hassan II International Cup Tournament	Runners-up	2nd	2	1	0	1	2	5
(United Arab Emirates) 2001 Friendship Tournament	Winners	1st	3	1	2	0	6	4
2002 LG Cup (Morocco)	Third place	3rd	2	1	1	0	2	0
2002 LG Cup (Iran)	Third place	3rd	2	0	2	0	1	1
2004 Qatar International Friendship Tournament	Winners	1st	5	4	0	1	9	4
2011 LG Cup (Morocco)	Third place	3rd	2	0	1	1	1	2
(France) 2015 Toulon Tournament	Runners-up	2nd	5	2	2	1	9	7
Total	6 Titles	28/28	91	43	25	23	138	98

== Head-to-head performance ==
Correct as of 13 November 2026 after the match against Niger. (Note: These statistics include historical matches played, which may include some or all pre-1992 Olympic qualifiers and final tournament, African Nations Championship (CHAN) games, and non-FIFA friendlies. This may differ from official FIFA-recognized "Class A" senior records, which exclude certain non-senior competitions.)

Team	Confederation	GP	W	D	L	GF	GA	GD	Win%	Loss%
Albania	UEFA	1	0	1	0	0	0	0	0%	0%
Algeria	CAF	32	14	10	8	35	30	+5	40%	22.86%
Angola	CAF	8	5	2	1	12	7	+5	62.5%	12.5%
Argentina	CONMEBOL	3	0	0	3	1	5	−4	0%	100%
Armenia	UEFA	1	1	0	0	6	0	+6	100%	0%
Australia	AFC	1	0	0	1	0	1	−1	0%	100%
Austria	UEFA	1	1	0	0	3	1	+2	100%	0%
Bahrain	AFC	3	3	0	0	6	0	+6	100%	0%
Belgium	UEFA	4	2	0	2	6	6	0	50%	50%
Benin	CAF	7	6	1	0	21	3	+18	85.71%	0%
Botswana	CAF	2	2	0	0	2	0	+2	100%	0%
Brazil	CONMEBOL	5	1	1	3	3	9	−6	20%	60%
Bulgaria	UEFA	6	2	3	1	10	5	+5	33.33%	16.67%
Burkina Faso	CAF	12	8	2	2	17	6	+11	66.67%	16.67%
Burundi	CAF	3	3	0	0	9	0	+9	100%	0%
Cameroon	CAF	14	3	5	6	12	12	0	21.43%	42.86%
Canada	CONCACAF	5	4	1	0	13	4	+9	80%	0%
Cape Verde	CAF	4	2	2	0	4	1	+3	50%	0%
Central African Republic	CAF	7	5	2	0	19	1	+18	71.43%	0%
Chile	CONMEBOL	2	1	1	0	3	1	+2	50%	0%
China	AFC	1	0	1	0	3	3	0	0%	0%
Colombia	CONMEBOL	1	0	0	1	0	2	−2	0%	100%
Comoros	CAF	5	4	1	0	10	3	+7	80%	0%
Congo	CAF	7	5	2	0	13	2	+11	71.43%	0%
Costa Rica	CONCACAF	1	1	0	0	1	0	+1	100%	0%
Croatia	UEFA	3	0	2	1	3	4	−1	0%	33.33%
Czech Republic	UEFA	1	0	1	0	0	0	0	0%	0%
Denmark	UEFA	2	1	0	1	5	5	0	50%	50%
DR Congo	CAF	17	5	9	3	23	14	+9	29.41%	17.65%
East Germany	UEFA	4	3	0	1	8	5	+3	75%	25%
Ecuador	CONMEBOL	1	0	1	0	1	1	0	0%	0%
Egypt	CAF	30	14	12	4	35	18	+17	46.67%	13.33%
England	UEFA	2	0	1	1	0	1	−1	0%	50%
Equatorial Guinea	CAF	5	4	0	1	10	2	+2	80%	20%
Estonia	UEFA	1	1	0	0	3	1	+2	100%	0%
Ethiopia	CAF	7	7	0	0	16	0	+16	100%	0%
Finland	UEFA	2	0	1	1	0	1	−1	0%	50%
France	UEFA	7	0	2	5	6	16	−10	0%	66.67%
Gabon	CAF	22	12	4	6	49	22	+27	54.55%	27.27%
Gambia	CAF	8	6	1	1	14	2	+12	75%	12.5%
Georgia	UEFA	1	1	0	0	3	0	+3	100%	0%
Germany (Note: Includes West Germany)	UEFA	6	0	0	6	3	17	−14	0%	100%
Ghana	CAF	11	5	3	3	8	8	0	45.45%	27.27%
Greece	UEFA	1	0	1	0	0	0	0	0%	0%
Guinea	CAF	14	6	6	2	19	12	+7	42.86%	14.29%
Guinea-Bissau	CAF	2	2	0	0	8	0	+8	100%	0%
Haiti	CONCACAF	1	1	0	0	4	2	+2	100%	0%
Hong Kong	AFC	1	0	1	0	0	0	0	0%	0%
Hungary	UEFA	3	0	0	3	2	12	−10	0%	100%
India	AFC	1	1	0	0	1	0	+1	100%	0%
Indonesia	AFC	1	1	0	0	2	0	+2	100%	0%
Iran	AFC	1	0	0	1	0	1	−1	0%	100%
Iraq	AFC	10	3	4	3	6	10	−4	30%	30%
Italy	UEFA	1	0	0	1	0	1	−1	0%	100%
Ivory Coast	CAF	22	7	8	7	28	26	+2	31.82%	31.82%
Jamaica	CONCACAF	1	1	0	0	1	0	+1	100%	0%
Jordan	AFC	5	4	1	0	15	4	+11	80%	0%
Kenya	CAF	6	3	2	1	10	3	+7	50%	16.67%
Kuwait	AFC	6	3	2	1	14	9	+5	50%	16.67%
Lebanon	AFC	3	2	0	1	5	2	+3	0%	0%
Lesotho	CAF	3	3	0	0	10	0	+10	100%	0%
Liberia	CAF	5	4	0	1	14	3	+11	80%	20%
Libya	CAF	20	10	6	4	34	18	+16	50%	20%
Luxembourg	UEFA	3	3	0	0	6	1	+5	100%	0%
Madagascar	CAF	2	2	0	0	7	2	+5	100%	0%
Malawi	CAF	11	7	3	1	17	4	+13	63.64%	9.09%
Malaysia	AFC	4	2	1	1	9	4	+5	50%	50%
Mali	CAF	22	9	8	5	35	14	+21	40.91%	22.73%
Malta	UEFA	3	2	1	0	7	4	+3	66.67%	0%
Mauritania	CAF	11	7	4	0	27	5	+22	63.64%	0%
Mexico	CONCACAF	1	1	0	0	2	1	+1	100%	0%
Mozambique	CAF	5	4	0	1	12	2	+10	80%	20%
Myanmar	AFC	1	0	1	0	2	2	0	0%	0%
Namibia	CAF	7	6	1	0	15	2	+13	85.71%	0%
Netherlands	UEFA	4	1	1	2	5	6	−1	25%	50%
New Zealand	OFC	2	2	0	0	6	0	+6	100%	0%
Niger	CAF	10	9	0	1	28	4	+24	90%	10%
Nigeria	CAF	12	6	3	3	14	8	+6	50%	25%
Northern Ireland	UEFA	2	0	1	1	2	3	−1	0%	50%
Norway	UEFA	2	0	2	0	3	3	0	0%	0%
Oman	AFC	2	0	2	0	0	0	0	0%	0%
Palestine	AFC	2	2	0	0	7	0	+7	100%	0%
Paraguay	CONMEBOL	2	1	1	0	2	1	+1	50%	0%
Peru	CONMEBOL	2	0	1	1	0	3	−3	0%	50%
Poland	UEFA	5	1	2	2	3	9	−6	20%	40%
Portugal	UEFA	3	2	0	1	4	2	+2	66.67%	33.33%
Qatar	AFC	2	1	1	0	1	0	+1	50%	0%
Republic of Ireland	UEFA	1	0	0	1	0	1	−1	0%	100%
Romania	UEFA	2	1	0	1	3	5	−2	50%	50%
Russia (Note: Includes Soviet Union)	UEFA	4	0	1	3	3	7	−4	0%	75%
Rwanda	CAF	4	2	1	1	7	4	+3	50%	25%
São Tomé and Príncipe	CAF	2	2	0	0	5	0	+5	100%	0%
Saudi Arabia	AFC	9	4	2	3	18	7	+11	44.44%	33.33%
Scotland	UEFA	2	2	0	0	4	0	+4	100%	0%
Senegal	CAF	32	17	6	9	42	20	+22	53.13%	28.13%
Serbia (Note: Includes Yugoslavia)	UEFA	6	1	1	4	5	12	−7	16.67%	66.67%
Sierra Leone	CAF	8	7	1	0	17	1	+16	87.5%	0%
Singapore	AFC	1	1	0	0	1	0	+1	100%	0%
Somalia	CAF	1	1	0	0	3	0	+3	100%	0%
South Africa	CAF	9	2	3	4	10	14	−4	22.22%	44.44%
South Korea	AFC	6	1	4	1	10	9	+1	16.67%	16.67%
South Yemen	AFC	1	1	0	0	4	0	+4	0%	0%
Spain	UEFA	4	0	2	2	4	6	−2	0%	50%
Sudan	CAF	7	3	4	0	9	3	0	42.86%	0%
Switzerland	UEFA	3	3	0	0	6	2	+4	100%	0%
Syria	AFC	4	4	0	0	7	0	+7	100%	0%
Tanzania	CAF	8	7	0	1	15	5	+10	87.5%	12.5%
Thailand	AFC	1	1	0	0	2	1	+1	100%	0%
Togo	CAF	12	6	3	3	22	11	+11	50%	25%
Trinidad and Tobago	CONCACAF	3	3	0	0	4	0	+4	100%	0%
Tunisia	CAF	51	14	28	9	55	46	+9	27.45%	17.65%
Uganda	CAF	5	3	0	2	14	8	+6	60%	40%
Ukraine	UEFA	1	0	1	0	0	0	0	0%	0%
United Arab Emirates	AFC	6	3	2	1	9	4	+5	50%	16.67%
Uruguay	CONMEBOL	2	0	0	2	0	2	−2	0%	100%
United States	CONCACAF	5	3	1	1	6	5	+1	60%	20%
Uzbekistan	AFC	1	1	0	0	2	0	+2	100%	0%
Yemen	AFC	1	1	0	0	4	0	+4	100%	0%
Zambia	CAF	22	14	2	6	31	19	+12	63.64%	27.27%
Zimbabwe	CAF	5	3	2	0	6	2	+4	60%	0%
Total (121)	All	724	364	200	160	1115	598	+517	50.28%	22.1%

== Honours ==
=== Continental ===
- Africa Cup of Nations
  - Champions (2): 1976, 2025
  - Runners-up (1): 2004
  - Third place (1): 1980
- African Nations Championship
  - Champions (3): 2018, 2020, 2024

=== Subregional ===
- Arab Cup / FIFA Arab Cup
  - (gold) Champions (2): 2012, 2025
- Arab Games
  - (gold) Gold Medal (2): 1961, 1976
  - (silver) Silver Medal (1): 1985
- Mediterranean Games
  - (gold) Gold Medal (1): 1983

=== Awards ===
- African National Team of the Year: 1985, 1986, 1997, 2023
- Africa Cup of Nations Fair play award: 2025

=== Orders and decorations ===
- Morocco: Officers of the Order of National Merit 2004

Officers of the Order of the Throne (20 December 2022)

=== Summary ===
Competition	1st place, gold medalist(s)	2nd place, silver medalist(s)	3rd place, bronze medalist(s)	Total
CAF African Cup of Nations	2	1	1	4
CAF African Nations Championship	3	0	0	3
Arab Cup / FIFA Arab Cup	2	0	0	2
Total	7	1	1	9

== See also ==
- Cultural significance of the Atlas lion
- Morocco A' national football team
- Morocco national under-23 football team
- Morocco national under-20 football team
- Morocco national under-17 football team
- Morocco women's national football team
- List of Morocco football players in foreign leagues
- Morocco national football team records and statistics

=== Other football codes ===
- Morocco national futsal team
- Morocco national beach soccer team

== Notes ==
Preceded by 1974 Zaire	African Champions; 1976 (First title)	Succeeded by 1978 Ghana
