= Lucca Farias =

Brazilian footballer (born 2000)

Personal information
- Full name: Lucca Farias Di Giuseppe
- Date of birth: 10 March 2000 (age 26)
- Height: 1.77 m (5 ft 10 in)
- Position: Midfielder

Youth career
- –2019: Portuguesa
- 2019: Ituano

Senior career*
Years	Team	Apps	(Gls)
2019–2020	Khor Fakkan	5	(0)
2020–2021	Al Urooba		
2021	Al Fujairah		
- * Club domestic league appearances and goals as of 17:17, 26 October 2019 (UTC)

Lucca Farias Di Giuseppe (born 10 March 2000), commonly known as Lucca, is a Brazilian footballer who plays as a midfielder.

== Career statistics ==
=== Club ===
As of 26 October 2019.

Club	Season	League			Cup		Continental		Other		Total	
Club	Season	Division	Apps	Goals	Apps	Goals	Apps	Goals	Apps	Goals	Apps	Goals
Khor Fakkan	2019–20	UAE Pro League	5	0	1 (Note: Appearances in the UAE League Cup)	0	0	0	0	0	6	0
Career total			5	0	1	0	0	0	0	0	6	0
