= Pedro Pavlov =

Argentine footballer (born 2000)

Personal information
- Full name: Pedro Javier Pavlov
- Date of birth: 24 August 2000 (age 26)
- Place of birth: Ushuaia, Argentina
- Height: 1.80 m (5 ft 11 in)
- Position: Left-back

Team information
- Current team: Khor Fakkan
- Number: 16

Youth career
- 2016–2019: River Plate

Senior career*
Years	Team	Apps	(Gls)
2019–2021	Al Wahda	0	(0)
2021–2024	Al Dhafra	68	(1)
2024–	Khor Fakkan	48	(4)
- * Club domestic league appearances and goals as of 09:05, 7 October 2026 (UTC)

Pedro Javier Pavlov (born 24 August 2000) is an Argentine professional footballer who plays as a left-back for UAE Pro League club Khor Fakkan.

== Career statistics ==
=== Club ===
As of 18 August 2021.

Club	Season	League			Cup		Continental		Other		Total	
Club	Season	Division	Apps	Goals	Apps	Goals	Apps	Goals	Apps	Goals	Apps	Goals
Al Wahda	2019–20	UAE Pro League	0	0	0	0	0	0	0	0	0	0
Al Wahda	2020–21	UAE Pro League	0	0	0	0	0	0	0	0	0	0
Al Wahda	Total		0	0	0	0	0	0	0	0	0	0
Al Dhafra	2020–21	UAE Pro League	5	0	0	0	0	0	0	0	5	0
Al Dhafra	2021–22	UAE Pro League	0	0	0	0	0	0	0	0	0	0
Al Dhafra	Total		5	0	0	0	0	0	0	0	5	0
Career total			5	0	0	0	0	0	0	0	5	0
