= Mubarak Ghanim =

Emirati footballer (born 1963)

Personal information
- Full name: Mubarak Ghanim Mubarak
- Date of birth: 3 September 1963 (age 63)
- Height: 1.71 m (5 ft 7 1/2 in)
- Position: Defender

Senior career*
Years	Team	Apps	(Gls)
- Al Khaleej Club

International career
1985–1990	United Arab Emirates	55	(1)
- * Club domestic league appearances and goals

Mubarak Ghanim Mubarak (Arabic: مُبَارَك غَانِم مُبَارَك), (born 3 September 1963), is a footballer from UAE, who played as a centre back for Al Khaleej Club in Sharjah, and the UAE national football team. He formed along with Khalil Ghanim, a hard defence line for the UAE team during their careers. His injury during the preparation for the 1990 FIFA World Cup had denied him from playing in the tournament.
