= Khalil Ghanim =

Emirati footballer (born 1964)

Khalil Ghanim Mubarak
Personal information
- Full name: Khalil Ghanim Mubarak
- Date of birth: 12 November 1964 (age 61)
- Place of birth: United Arab Emirates
- Height: 1.73 m (5 ft 8 in)
- Position: Defender

Senior career*
Years	Team	Apps	(Gls)
1984–1994	Al Khaleej Club		

International career
1985–1990	United Arab Emirates	52	(2)
- * Club domestic league appearances and goals

Khalil Ghanim Mubarak (Arabic: خَلِيل غَانِم مُبَارَك) (born 12 November 1964) is a footballer from UAE who played as a centre back for Al Khaleej Club in Sharjah, and the UAE national football team. He formed along with his brother Mubarak a hard defence line for the UAE team during their careers. His one goal in the World Cup Qualification round against Qatar had assisted the team in reaching the 1990 FIFA World Cup finals in Italy. He was sent off in their final group game against Yugoslavia, which his team lost 4–1.
