= Mohamed Ouahbi =

Moroccan football manager (born 1976)

- Ouahbi in 2026

Personal information
- Full name: Mohamed Ouahbi
- Date of birth: 7 September 1976 (age 50)
- Place of birth: Schaerbeek, Belgium

Team information
- Current team: Morocco (manager)

Managerial career
- Years: Team
- 1997–2003: Maccabi Brussels (youth)
- 2003–2014: Anderlecht (youth)
- 2014–2015: Anderlecht U21
- 2015–2016: Anderlecht (assistant)
- 2016–2021: Anderlecht (youth)
- 2022–2025: Morocco U20
- 2025–2026: Morocco U23
- 2026–: Morocco
Medal record
Men's football
Representing Morocco (as manager)
FIFA U-20 World Cup
Winner	2025 Chile
U-20 Africa Cup of Nations
Runner-up	2025 Egypt

Mohamed Ouahbi (Note: Berber languages: ⵎⵓⵀⴰⵎⴻⴷ ⵓⴰⵀⴱⵉ; Arabic: محمد وهبي) (born 7 September 1976) is a Belgian-Moroccan professional football manager who manages the Morocco national team.

Born in Belgium, Ouahbi spent most of his coaching career with Belgian club Anderlecht at youth level. He then managed Morocco at U20 and U23 level before becoming the manager of the senior side in 2026, leading them at the 2026 World Cup where they reached the quarter-finals.

== Biography ==
=== Early life and education ===
Mohamed Ouahbi was born in the "Cité des Ânes" district of Schaerbeek, in the Brussels-Capital Region, into a Moroccan-Riffian family from Nador (Bni Chiker). He grew up and attended school in Brussels.

At just nine years old, Ouahbi developed a passion for football during the 1986 FIFA World Cup. The Ouahbi family supported Belgium, but especially rooted for Morocco who reached the round of 16. Later, Ouahbi began studying to become an educator in Schaerbeek, hoping one day to combine his profession with his passion for football.

== Managerial career ==
=== Beginnings at Maccabi Brussels ===
Ouahbi began his coaching career at the age of 21. (Note: Mohamed Ouahbi speaking about his early coaching years interview with CEFF TV (10:02)) Starting in 1997, he joined Maccabi Brussels where he coached youth teams. He spent six seasons there, designing age-appropriate training sessions and gaining early structured experience in player observation, planning, and evaluation.

Working in a socially diverse environment with players of various backgrounds, he emphasized inclusion and co-education through sport. This period allowed him to develop leadership and communication skills, set aside stereotypes, and prioritize learning and education over strict competition.

Although sporting results were secondary to the club's educational goals, this stage became a foundation for Ouahbi's coaching philosophy, shaping his pedagogical approach and preparing him for roles in higher-level youth academies, leading to his later work with professional clubs in Brussels.

=== Anderlecht ===
In 2003, Ouahbi joined Anderlecht, beginning with the under-nine team, which included players such as Charly Musonda Jr. and Adnan Januzaj. There, he reunited with his friend Yannick Ferrera, whom he had met at Maccabi Brussels, and discovered the facilities of one of Belgium's elite clubs. He gradually advanced through the youth ranks, coaching teams from U10 to U21.

During the 2014–15 UEFA Youth League season, he led Anderlecht to the semi-finals, where they were defeated 3–1 by Shakhtar Donetsk in Nyon.

At the start of the 2015–16 Belgian Pro League season, Ouahbi became assistant coach of the first team under Besnik Hasi. Anderlecht finished second in the Belgian Pro League behind Club Brugge, qualifying for the 2016–17 UEFA Champions League qualifiers. In the UEFA Europa League, the club advanced to the round of 16, defeating Olympiacos, before being eliminated by Shakhtar Donetsk. After Besnik Hasi's dismissal in May 2016, Ouahbi returned to youth coaching duties.

In 2017–18, as U17 coach, he won the Belgian U17 championship, qualifying the team for the UEFA Youth League. He later obtained his UEFA Pro Licence in 2018.

He continued coaching Anderlecht youth sides until 2021, when he announced his departure after 17 years at the club.

=== Morocco U20 ===
In March 2022, Ouahbi was appointed by Fouzi Lekjaa, president of the Royal Moroccan Football Federation, as the new head coach of the Morocco national under-20 football team, assisted by Jamel Aït Ben Idir, succeeding Zakaria Aboub.

He led the team through several regional tournaments, including the 2022 Arab Cup U-20, the UNAF U-20 Tournament editions of 2022, 2023, and 2024 — the latter of which Morocco won, qualifying for the 2025 U-20 Africa Cup of Nations.

At the 2025 Africa U-20 Cup of Nations in Egypt, Morocco topped their group, defeated the hosts in the semi-final, and finished runners-up after losing 1–0 to South Africa in the final.

Later that year, he led Morocco at the 2025 FIFA U-20 World Cup in Chile. Morocco defeated the United States in the quarter-finals (3–1), overcame France on penalties in the semi-finals, and won the final 2–0 against Argentina, earning Morocco their first-ever U20 World Cup title.

In October 2025, Ouahbi was nominated for the CAF Coach of the Year Award.

=== Morocco U23 ===
In December 2025, Ouahbi became the Morocco U23 coach.

=== Morocco ===
On 5 March 2026, Ouahbi was appointed as new head coach of Morocco national team, replacing Walid Regragui.

== Managerial statistics ==
As of match played 17 November 2026

Managerial record by team and tenure
Team	Nat.	From	To	Record					Ref.
Team	Nat.	From	To	G	W	D	L	Win %	Ref.
Morocco U20	(Morocco)	10 March 2022	5 March 2026	68	37	13	18	54.41	
Morocco	(Morocco)	5 March 2026	Present	16	10	5	1	62.50	
Career Total				84	47	18	19	55.95	

== Honours ==
Morocco U20

- FIFA U-20 World Cup: 2025
