= List of international goals scored by Ahmed Faras =

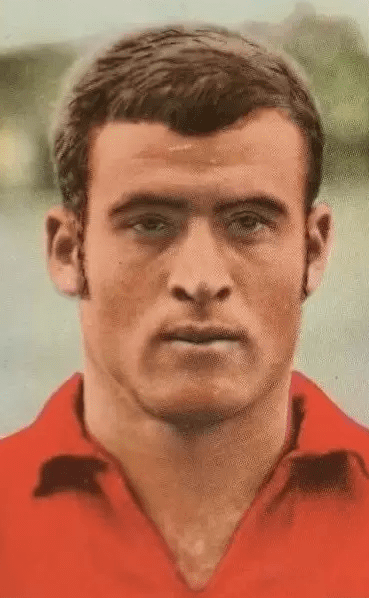
Faras at the 1970 FIFA World Cup

Ahmed Faras was a Moroccan professional footballer who represented the Morocco national team from 1966 until 1979. During that time, Faras scored 36 goals in 94 international appearances, making him the country's all-time top scorer.

== International goals ==
List of international goals scored by Ahmed Faras
No.	Date	Venue	Opponent	Score	Result	Competition
1	5 November 1967	Stade Mohammed V, Casablanca, Morocco	Tunisia	1–1	1–1	1968 Summer Olympic qualification
2	9 June 1968	Stade Mohammed V, Casablanca, Morocco	Ghana	1–0	1–1	1968 Summer Olympic qualification
3	30 June 1968	Accra Sports Stadium, Accra, Ghana	Ghana	2–1	2–1	1968 Summer Olympic qualification
4	21 September 1969	Stade Mohammed V, Casablanca, Morocco	Nigeria	2–1	2–1	1970 FIFA World Cup qualification
5	28 March 1971	Stade Mohammed V, Casablanca, Morocco	Niger	1–0	5–2	1972 Summer Olympic qualification
6	28 March 1971	Stade Mohammed V, Casablanca, Morocco	Niger	4–2	5–2	1972 Summer Olympic qualification
7	25 April 1971	Stade du 29 Juillet, Niamey, Niger	Niger	1–0	3–1	1972 Summer Olympic qualification
8	8 October 1971	İzmir Atatürk Stadium, İzmir, Turkey	Egypt	1–0	1–0	1971 Mediterranean Games
9	17 February 1972	Stade Demba Diop, Dakar, Senegal	Senegal	3–1	3–1	Friendly
10	25 February 1972	Stade de la Réunification, Douala, Cameroon	Congo	1–0	1–1	1972 Africa Cup of Nations
11	27 February 1972	Stade de la Réunification, Douala, Cameroon	Sudan	1–0	1–1	1972 Africa Cup of Nations
12	29 February 1972	Stade de la Réunification, Douala, Cameroon	Zaire	1–1	1–1	1972 Africa Cup of Nations
13	23 April 1972	Stade El Menzah, Tunis, Tunisia	Tunisia	2–1	3–3	1972 Summer Olympic qualification
14	30 April 1972	Stade Mohammed V, Casablanca, Morocco	Mali	1–0	2–1	1972 Summer Olympic qualification
15	21 May 1972	Stade Modibo Kéïta, Bamako, Mali	Mali	1–0	2–1	1972 Summer Olympic qualification
16	31 August 1972	Tuja-Stadion, Ingolstadt, Germany	Malaysia	2–0	6–0	1972 Summer Olympics
17	31 August 1972	Tuja-Stadion, Ingolstadt, Germany	Malaysia	3–0	6–0	1972 Summer Olympics
18	31 August 1972	Tuja-Stadion, Ingolstadt, Germany	Malaysia	4–0	6–0	1972 Summer Olympics
19	25 February 1973	Stade Saniat Rmel, Tétouan, Morocco	Guinea	1–0	2–0	1974 FIFA World Cup qualification
20	25 February 1973	Stade Saniat Rmel, Tétouan, Morocco	Guinea	2–0	2–0	1974 FIFA World Cup qualification
21	3 June 1973	Stade Saniat Rmel, Tétouan, Morocco	Ivory Coast	1–0	4–1	1974 FIFA World Cup qualification
22	3 June 1973	Stade Saniat Rmel, Tétouan, Morocco	Ivory Coast	2–0	4–1	1974 FIFA World Cup qualification
23	25 November 1973	Stade Saniat Rmel, Tétouan, Morocco	Zambia	2–0	2–0	1974 FIFA World Cup qualification
24	1 October 1974	Abbasiyyin Stadium, Damascus, Syria	Tunisia	2–1	2–1	1974 Kuneitra Cup
25	6 October 1974	Abbasiyyin Stadium, Damascus, Syria	Sudan	2–0	2–0	1974 Kuneitra Cup
26	9 October 1974	Abbasiyyin Stadium, Damascus, Syria	Syria	1–1	1–1	1974 Kuneitra Cup
27	23 February 1975	Stade Mohammed V, Casablanca, Morocco	Libya	1–0	2–1	1976 Summer Olympic qualification
28	22 March 1975	Stade Hassan-II, Fez, Morocco	Senegal	1–0	4–0	1976 Africa Cup of Nations qualification
29	13 April 1975	Kaolack, Senegal	Senegal	1–2	1–2	1976 Africa Cup of Nations qualification
30	14 December 1975	Stade Mohammed V, Casablanca, Morocco	Tunisia	1–0	1–0	1976 Summer Olympic qualification
31	20 February 1976	Prince Faisal bin Fahd Stadium, Riyadh, Saudi Arabia	Saudi Arabia	2–0	2–0	Friendly
32	6 March 1976	Dire Dawa Stadium, Dire Dawa, Ethiopia	Nigeria	1–0	3–1	1976 Africa Cup of Nations
33	9 March 1976	Addis Ababa Stadium, Addis Ababa, Ethiopia	Egypt	1–0	2–1	1976 Africa Cup of Nations
34	11 March 1976	Addis Ababa Stadium, Addis Ababa, Ethiopia	Nigeria	1–1	2–1	1976 Africa Cup of Nations
35	8 April 1979	Stade Mohammed V, Casablanca, Morocco	Mauritania	4–1	4–1	1980 Africa Cup of Nations qualification
36	24 June 1979	Stade El Bachir, Mohammedia, Morocco	Togo	1–0	7–0	1980 Africa Cup of Nations qualification

== Statistics ==
Goals by year
National team	Year	Apps	Goals
Morocco
Morocco	1966	2	0
Morocco	1967	6	1
Morocco	1968	4	2
Morocco	1969	7	1
Morocco	1970	3	2
Morocco	1971	9	4
Morocco	1972	16	9
Morocco	1973	8	5
Morocco	1974	11	3
Morocco	1975	7	4
Morocco	1976	11	5
Morocco	1977	1	0
Morocco	1978	3	0
Morocco	1979	6	6
Total		94	42
