= Ahmadou Camara =

Guinean professional footballer

Personal information
- Full name: Ahmadou Ama Camara
- Date of birth: 1 August 2003 (age 23)
- Place of birth: Conakry, Guinea
- Height: 1.78 m (5 ft 10 in)
- Position: Central midfielder

Team information
- Current team: Khor Fakkan
- Number: 5

Youth career
- –2018: Hafia FC
- 2019–2020: Fath US
- 2020–2022: Raja CA

Senior career*
Years	Team	Apps	(Gls)
2022–2024	Raja CA	41	(0)
2024–	Khor Fakkan	0	(0)

International career^{‡}
2022–2024	Guinea U20	3	(0)
2024–	Guinea U23	2	(0)
- * Club domestic league appearances and goals as of 28 September 2024 ‡ National team caps and goals as of 18 April 2024

Ahmadou Camara (born 1 August 2003) is a Guinean professional footballer who plays as a central midfielder for UAE Pro League club Khor Fakkan.

== Early life ==
Ahmadou Camara was born on 1 August 2003 in Conakry. After a period at Hafia FC, he left Guinea for Morocco in 2018 to enter a football scouting program. Once in the Kingdom, he joined Fath Union Sport's academy where he will play for a year before being spotted by the Raja Club Athletic in 2020.

At the age of 17, he arrived at the Raja-Oasis Sports Complex and joined the U19 team. He quickly established himself as a starter and reached the U23 team under Bouchaib El Moubarki that was playing in the North West Group of the Amateurs 3 League, which is the fifth level of Moroccan football. For two successive seasons, the team was close to gain promotion but finished in second and third position respectively.

== Club career ==
Thanks to his performance and his consistency, Rachid Taoussi called up the young Guinean in June 2022 to join the first team's training. On 2 July 2022, he made his professional debut against Maghreb AS on the last leg of the Botola (0–0).

On 18 March 2023, under Mondher Kebaier, he made his Champions League debut against Vipers SC in Tanzania (1–1), and played the quarter-finals against Al Ahly.

On 14 April, he made his starting debut against Jeunesse Sportive Soualem in the league (0–0). On June 9, the club announced the extension of Camara's contract for four additional seasons.

On 27 September 2024, Ahmadou Camara moved to the Emirati club Khor Fakkan Club.

== International career ==
In 2022, he received his first call-up to the Guinean U20 squad and played three friendly games.
