= Morocco national football team records and statistics =

This article lists various football records in relation to the Morocco national football team. The page is updated where necessary after each Morocco match, and is correct as of 31 May 2018.

== FIFA World Cup ==
=== Matches ===
3 June 1970 1970 World Cup	West Germany	2–1	Morocco	León, Mexico
16:00 UTC−6	Seeler 56'; Müller 80'	Report	Jarir 21'	Stadium: Estadio Nou Camp, León; Attendance: 12,942; Referee: Laurens van Ravens (Netherlands)

6 June 1970 1970 World Cup	Peru	3–0	Morocco	León, Mexico
16:00 UTC−6	Cubillas 65', 75'; Challe 67'	Report		Stadium: Estadio Nou Camp, León; Attendance: 13,537; Referee: Tofiq Bahramov (Soviet Union)

11 June 1970 1970 World Cup	Bulgaria	1–1	Morocco	León, Mexico
16:00 UTC−6	Zhechev 40'	Report	Ghazouani 61'	Stadium: Estadio Nou Camp, León; Attendance: 12,299; Referee: Antonio Ribeiro Saldanha (Portugal)

2 June 1986 1986 World Cup GS	Morocco	0–0	Poland	Monterrey, Mexico
16:00 UTC−6		Report		Stadium: Estadio Universitario; Attendance: 19,900; Referee: José Luis Martínez Bazán (Uruguay)

6 June 1986 1986 World Cup GS	England	0–0	Morocco	Monterrey, Mexico
16:00 UTC−6		Report		Stadium: Estadio Tecnológico; Attendance: 20,200; Referee: Gabriel González (Paraguay)

11 June 1986 1986 World Cup GS	Portugal	1–3	Morocco	Zapopan, Mexico
16:00 UTC−6	Diamantino 80'	Report	Khairi 19', 26'; Merry Krimau 62'	Stadium: Estadio Tres de Marzo; Attendance: 28,000; Referee: Alan Snoddy (Northern Ireland)

17 June 1986 1986 World Cup R16	Morocco	0–1	West Germany	Monterrey, Mexico
16:00 UTC−6		Report	Matthäus 87'	Stadium: Estadio Universitario; Attendance: 19,800; Referee: Zoran Petrović (Yugoslavia)

19 June 1994 1994 World Cup	Belgium	1–0	Morocco	Orlando, United States
12:30 UTC-4	Degryse 11'			Stadium: Citrus Bowl; Attendance: 61,219; Referee: José Torres Cadena (Colombia)

25 June 1994 1994 World Cup	Saudi Arabia	2–1	Morocco	East Rutherford, United States
19:30 UTC-4	Al-Jaber 7' (pen.); Anwar 45'		Chaouch 26'	Stadium: Giants Stadium; Attendance: 76,322; Referee: Philip Don (England)

29 June 1994 1994 World Cup	Morocco	1–2	Netherlands	Orlando, United States
12:30 UTC-2	Nader 47'		Bergkamp 43'; Roy 77'	Stadium: Citrus Bowl; Attendance: 60,578; Referee: Alberto Tejada Noriega (Peru)

10 June 1998 1998 World Cup	Morocco	2–2	Norway	Montpellier, France
21:00	Hadji 37'; Hadda 60'		Chippo 45+1' (o.g.); Eggen 61'	Stadium: Stade de la Mosson; Attendance: 29,800; Referee: Pirom Un-prasert (Thailand)

16 June 1998 1998 World Cup	Brazil	3–0	Morocco	Nantes, France
21:00	Ronaldo 9'; Rivaldo 45+2'; Bebeto 50'			Stadium: Stade de la Beaujoire; Attendance: 35,500; Referee: Nikolai Levnikov (Russia)

23 June 1998 1998 World Cup	Scotland	0–3	Morocco	Saint-Étienne, France
21:00			Bassir 23', 85'; Hadda 46'	Stadium: Stade Geoffroy-Guichard; Attendance: 30,600; Referee: Ali Bujsaim (United Arab Emirates)

15 June 2018 2018 World Cup	Morocco	0-1	Iran	Saint Petersburg, Russia
18:00 UTC+3		Report		Stadium: Krestovsky Stadium

20 June 2018 2018 World Cup	Portugal	1-0	Morocco	Moscow, Russia
15:00 UTC+3	Ronaldo	Report		Stadium: Luzhniki Stadium

25 June 2018 2018 World Cup	Spain	2-2	Morocco	Kaliningrad, Russia
20:00 UTC+2		Report		Stadium: Kaliningrad Stadium

23 November 2022 FIFA World Cup	Morocco	0–0	Croatia	Al Khor, Qatar
13:00		Report		Stadium: Al Bayt Stadium; Attendance: 59,407; Referee: Fernando Rapallini (Argentina)

27 November 2022 FIFA World Cup	Belgium	0–2	Morocco	Doha, Qatar
22:00		Report	Saïss 73'; Aboukhlal 90+2'	Stadium: Al Thumama Stadium; Attendance: 43,738; Referee: César Ramos (Mexico)

1 December 2022 FIFA World Cup	Canada	1–2	Morocco	Doha, Qatar
18:00	Aguerd 40' (o.g.)	Report	Ziyech 4'; En-Nesyri 23'	Stadium: Al Thumama Stadium; Attendance: 43,102; Referee: Raphael Claus (Brazil)

== Africa Cup of Nations Group ==
=== Matches ===
9 February 1998 1998 ACN GS	Morocco	1–1	Zambia	Bobo-Dioulasso, Burkina Faso
18:15 UTC+2	Bahja 37'		Chilumba 87'	Stadium: Stade Municipal; Attendance: 10,000; Referee: Abdul Rahman Al-Zeid (Saudi Arabia)

13 February 1998 1998 ACN GS	Morocco	3–0	Mozambique	Bobo-Dioulasso, Burkina Faso
20:00 UTC+2	Chiba 39'; El Khattabi 40'; Fertout 82'			Stadium: Stade Municipal; Attendance: 3,000; Referee: Lucien Bouchardeau (Niger)

17 February 1998 1998 ACN GS	Morocco	1–0	Egypt	Ouagadougou, Burkina Faso
16:00 UTC+2	Hadji 90'			Stadium: Stade Municipal; Attendance: 500; Referee: Kim Milton Nielsen (Denmark)

22 February 1998 1998 ACN QF	Morocco	1–2	South Africa	Ouagadougou, Burkina Faso
16:00 UTC+2	Chiba 36'		McCarthy 22'; Nyathi 79'	Stadium: Stade Municipal; Attendance: 2,000; Referee: Lucien Bouchardeau (Niger)

26 January 2000 2000 ACN GS	Morocco	1–0	Congo	Lagos, Nigeria
19:30 UTC+1	Bassir 85'			Stadium: National Stadium; Attendance: 8,000; Referee: Alain Sars (France)

29 January 2000 2000 ACN GS	Morocco	0–0	Tunisia	Lagos, Nigeria
16:00 UTC+1				Stadium: National Stadium; Attendance: 5,000; Referee: Falla Ndoye (Senegal)

3 February 2000 2000 ACN GS	Nigeria	2–0	Morocco	Lagos, Nigeria
	George 28'; Aghahowa 81'			Stadium: National Stadium; Attendance: 60,000; Referee: Coffi Codjia (Benin)

21 January 2006 2006 AFCON GS	Morocco	0–1	Ivory Coast	Cairo, Egypt
14:00 UTC+2			Drogba 39' (pen.)	Stadium: Cairo International Stadium; Attendance: 8,000; Referee: Jérôme Damon (South Africa)

24 January 2006 2006 AFCON GS	Egypt	0–0	Morocco	Cairo, Egypt
20:00 UTC+2				Stadium: Cairo International Stadium; Attendance: 47,000; Referee: Coffi Codjia (Benin)

28 January 2006 2006 AFCON GS	Libya	0–0	Morocco	Cairo, Egypt
19:00 UTC+2				Stadium: Cairo Military Academy Stadium; Attendance: 5,000; Referee: Mourad Daami (Tunisia)

23 January 2012 2012 ACN GS	Morocco	1–2	Tunisia	Libreville, Gabon
20:00 UTC+1	Kharja 86'		Korbi 34'; Msakni 76'	Stadium: Stade d'Angondjé; Attendance: 28,000; Referee: Daniel Bennett (South Africa)

27 January 2012 2012 ACN GS	Gabon	3–2	Morocco	Libreville, Gabon
20:00 UTC+1	Aubameyang 76'; Cousin 79'; Mbanangoyé 90+10'		Kharja 24', 90+1' (pen.)	Stadium: Stade d'Angondjé; Attendance: 35,000; Referee: Bakary Gassama (Gambia)

31 January 2012 2012 ACN GS	Niger	0–1	Morocco	Libreville, Gabon
19:00 UTC+1			Belhanda 78'	Stadium: Stade d'Angondjé; Attendance: 4,000; Referee: Hamada Nampiandraza (Madagascar)

19 January 2013 2013 AFCON GS	Angola	0–0	Morocco	Johannesburg, South Africa
21:00 UTC+2				Stadium: Soccer City; Attendance: 25 000; Referee: Badara Diatta (Senegal)

23 January 2013 2013 AFCON GS	Morocco	1–1	Cape Verde	Durban, South Africa
21:00 UTC+2	El-Arabi 78'		Platini 35'	Stadium: Moses Mabhida Stadium; Attendance: 25 000; Referee: Janny Sikazwe (Zambia)

27 January 2013 2013 AFCON GS	Morocco	2–2	South Africa	Durban, South Africa
19:00 UTC+2	El Adoua 10'; Hafidi 82'		Mahlangu 71'; Sangweni 86'	Stadium: Moses Mabhida Stadium; Attendance: 45 000; Referee: Bakary Gassama (Gambia)

16 January 2017 2017 AFCON GS	DR Congo	1–0	Morocco	Oyem, Gabon
19:00 GMT	Kabananga 55'	Report		Stadium: Stade d'Oyem; Referee: Hamada Nampiandraza (Madagascar)

20 January 2017 2017 AFCON GS	Morocco	3–1	Togo	Oyem, Gabon
19:00 GMT	Bouhaddouz 14'; Saïss 21'; En-Nesyri 72'	Report	Dossevi 5'	Stadium: Stade d'Oyem; Referee: Mahamadou Keita (Mali)

24 January 2017 2017 AFCON GS	Morocco	1–0	Ivory Coast	Oyem, Gabon
19:00 GMT	Alioui 64'	Report		Stadium: Stade d'Oyem; Referee: Sidi Alioum (Cameroon)

29 January 2017 2017 AFCON QF	Egypt	1–0	Morocco	Port-Gentil, Gabon
19:00 GMT	Kahraba 88'	Report		Stadium: Stade de Port-Gentil; Referee: Eric Otogo-Castane (Gabon)

== Head-to-head performance ==
Correct as of 4 October 2026.

Team	Confederation	GP	W	D	L	GF	GA	GD	Win%	Loss%
Albania	UEFA	1	0	1	0	0	0	0	0%	0%
Algeria	CAF	36	17	12	7	48	26	+22	47.22%	19.44%
Angola	CAF	8	5	2	1	12	7	+5	62.5%	12.5%
Argentina	CONMEBOL	3	0	0	3	1	5	–4	0%	100%
Armenia	UEFA	1	1	0	0	6	0	+6	100%	0%
Australia	AFC	1	0	0	1	0	1	–1	0%	100%
Austria	UEFA	1	1	0	0	3	1	+2	100%	0%
Bahrain	AFC	3	3	0	0	6	0	+6	100%	0%
Belgium	UEFA	5	3	0	2	8	6	+2	60%	40%
Benin	CAF	7	6	1	0	21	3	+18	85.71%	0%
Botswana	CAF	2	2	0	0	2	0	+2	100%	0%
Brazil	CONMEBOL	5	1	1	3	3	9	–6	20%	60%
Bulgaria	UEFA	6	2	3	1	10	5	+5	33.33%	16.67%
Burkina Faso	CAF	12	8	2	2	17	6	+11	66.67%	16.67%
Burundi	CAF	3	3	0	0	9	0	+9	100%	0%
Cameroon	CAF	14	3	5	6	12	12	0	21.43%	42.86%
Canada	CONCACAF	5	4	1	0	13	4	+9	80%	0%
Cape Verde	CAF	4	2	2	0	4	1	+3	50%	0%
Central African Republic	CAF	5	3	2	0	10	1	+9	60%	0%
Central African Republic	CAF	1	1	0	0	4	0	+4	100%	0%
Chile	CONMEBOL	2	1	1	0	3	1	+2	50%	0%
China	AFC	1	0	1	0	3	3	0	0%	0%
Colombia	CONMEBOL	1	0	0	1	0	2	–2	0%	100%
Comoros	CAF	5	4	1	0	10	3	+7	80%	0%
Congo	CAF	7	5	2	0	13	2	+11	71.43%	0%
Costa Rica	CONCACAF	1	1	0	0	1	0	+1	100%	0%
Croatia	UEFA	3	0	2	1	3	4	–1	0%	33.33%
Czech Republic	UEFA	1	0	1	0	0	0	0	0%	0%
Denmark	UEFA	2	1	0	1	5	5	0	50%	50%
DR Congo	CAF	17	5	9	3	23	12	+11	29.41%	17.65%
East Germany	UEFA	4	3	0	1	8	5	+3	75%	25%
Ecuador	CONMEBOL	1	0	1	0	1	1	0	0%	0%
Egypt	CAF	30	14	12	4	35	18	+17	46.67%	13.33%
England	UEFA	2	0	1	1	0	1	–1	0%	50%
Equatorial Guinea	CAF	5	4	0	1	10	2	+2	80%	20%
Estonia	UEFA	1	1	0	0	3	1	+2	100%	0%
Ethiopia	CAF	7	7	0	0	16	0	+16	100%	0%
Finland	UEFA	2	0	1	1	0	1	–1	0%	50%
France	UEFA	13	2	4	7	9	23	–14	15.38%	53.85%
Gabon	CAF	22	12	4	6	49	22	+27	54.55%	27.27%
Gambia	CAF	8	6	1	1	14	2	+12	75%	12.5%
Germany*	UEFA	6	0	0	6	3	17	–14	0%	100%
Georgia	UEFA	1	1	0	0	3	0	+3	100%	0%
Ghana	CAF	11	5	3	3	8	8	0	45.45%	27.27%
Greece	UEFA	1	0	1	0	0	0	0	0%	0%
Guinea	CAF	14	6	6	2	19	12	+7	42.86%	14.29%
Guinea-Bissau	CAF	2	2	0	0	8	0	+8	100%	0%
Haiti	CONCACAF	1	1	0	0	4	2	+2	100%	0%
Hong Kong	AFC	1	0	1	0	0	0	0	0%	0%
Hungary	UEFA	3	0	0	3	2	12	–10	0%	100%
India	AFC	1	1	0	0	1	0	+1	100%	0%
Indonesia	AFC	1	1	0	0	2	0	+2	100%	0%
Iran	AFC	1	0	0	1	0	1	–1	0%	100%
Iraq	AFC	10	3	4	3	6	10	–4	30%	30%
Italy	UEFA	1	0	0	1	0	1	–1	0%	100%
Ivory Coast	CAF	22	7	8	7	28	26	+2	31.82%	31.82%
Jamaica	CONCACAF	1	1	0	0	1	0	+1	100%	0%
Jordan	AFC	5	5	0	0	15	4	+11	100%	0%
Kenya	CAF	5	3	2	0	10	2	+8	60%	0%
Kuwait	AFC	6	3	2	1	14	9	+5	50%	16.67%
Lebanon	AFC	3	2	0	1	5	2	+3	66.67%	33.33%
Lesotho	CAF	3	3	0	0	10	0	+10	100%	0%
Liberia	CAF	5	4	0	1	14	3	+11	80%	20%
Libya	CAF	20	10	6	4	34	18	+16	50%	20%
Luxembourg	UEFA	3	3	0	0	6	1	+5	100%	0%
Madagascar	CAF	1	1	0	0	4	0	+4	100%	0%
Malawi	CAF	11	7	3	1	17	4	+13	63.64%	9.09%
Malaysia	AFC	4	2	1	1	10	5	+5	50%	25%
Mali	CAF	22	9	8	5	35	14	+21	40.91%	22.73%
Malta	UEFA	3	2	1	0	7	4	+3	66.67%	0%
Mauritania	CAF	11	7	4	0	27	5	+22	63.64%	0%
Mexico	CONCACAF	1	1	0	0	2	1	+1	100%	0%
Mozambique	CAF	5	4	0	1	12	2	+10	80%	20%
Myanmar	AFC	1	0	1	0	2	2	0	0%	0%
Namibia	CAF	7	6	1	0	15	2	+13	85.71%	0%
Netherlands	UEFA	4	1	1	2	5	6	–1	25%	50%
New Zealand	OFC	2	2	0	0	6	0	+6	100%	0%
Niger	CAF	10	8	1	1	23	3	+20	80%	10%
Nigeria	CAF	11	6	2	3	14	8	+6	54.55%	27.27%
Northern Ireland	UEFA	2	0	1	1	2	3	–1	0%	50%
Norway	UEFA	2	0	2	0	3	3	0	0%	0%
Oman	AFC	2	0	2	0	0	0	0	0%	0%
Palestine	AFC	2	2	0	0	7	0	+7	100%	0%
Paraguay	CONMEBOL	2	1	1	0	2	1	+1	50%	0%
Peru	CONMEBOL	2	0	1	1	0	3	–3	0%	50%
Poland	UEFA	5	1	2	2	3	9	–6	20%	40%
Portugal	UEFA	4	3	0	1	5	2	+3	75%	25%
Qatar	AFC	2	1	1	0	1	0	+1	50%	0%
Republic of Ireland	UEFA	1	0	0	1	0	1	–1	0%	100%
Romania	UEFA	2	1	0	1	3	5	–2	50%	50%
Russia**	UEFA	4	0	1	3	3	7	–4	0%	75%
Rwanda	CAF	4	2	1	1	7	4	+3	50%	25%
São Tomé and Príncipe	CAF	2	2	0	0	5	0	+5	100%	0%
Saudi Arabia	AFC	9	4	2	3	18	7	+11	44.44%	33.33%
Scotland	UEFA	1	1	0	0	3	0	+3	100%	0%
Senegal	CAF	31	17	6	8	41	19	+22	54.84%	25.81%
Serbia***	UEFA	6	1	1	4	5	12	–7	16.67%	66.67%
Sierra Leone	CAF	8	7	1	0	17	1	+16	87.5%	0%
Singapore	AFC	1	1	0	0	1	0	+1	100%	0%
Slovakia	UEFA	2	2	0	0	4	2	0	100%	0%
Somalia	CAF	1	1	0	0	3	0	+3	100%	0%
South Africa	CAF	9	2	3	4	10	14	–4	22.22%	44.44%
South Korea	AFC	6	1	4	1	10	9	+1	16.67%	16.67%
South Yemen	AFC	1	1	0	0	4	0	+4	100%	0%
Spain	UEFA	4	0	2	2	4	6	–2	0%	50%
Sudan	CAF	7	3	4	0	9	3	0	42.86%	0%
Switzerland	UEFA	4	3	0	1	7	10	–3	75%	25%
Syria	AFC	4	4	0	0	7	0	+7	100%	0%
Tanzania	CAF	8	7	0	1	15	5	+10	87.5%	12.5%
Thailand	AFC	1	1	0	0	2	1	+1	100%	0%
Togo	CAF	12	6	3	3	22	11	+11	50%	25%
Trinidad and Tobago	CONCACAF	3	3	0	0	4	0	+4	100%	0%
Tunisia	CAF	51	14	28	9	55	46	+9	27.45%	17.65%
Uganda	CAF	5	3	0	2	14	8	+6	60%	40%
Ukraine	UEFA	1	0	1	0	0	0	0	0%	0%
United Arab Emirates	AFC	6	3	2	1	9	4	+5	50%	16.67%
Uruguay	CONMEBOL	2	0	0	2	0	2	–2	0%	100%
United States	CONCACAF	5	3	1	1	6	5	+1	60%	20%
Uzbekistan	AFC	1	1	0	0	2	0	+2	100%	0%
Yemen	AFC	1	1	0	0	4	0	+4	100%	0%
Zambia	CAF	22	14	2	6	32	19	+12	63.64%	27.27%
Zimbabwe	CAF	5	3	2	0	6	2	+4	60%	0%

(*) includes West Germany
(**) includes Soviet Union
(***) includes Yugoslavia

== Appearances ==
Rank	Player	Caps	Goals	Career
1	Noureddine Naybet	115	4	1990–2006
2	Ahmed Faras	94	36	1966–1979
3	Youssef Safri	79	8	1999–2009
4	Houssine Kharja	78	12	2004–2015
4	Ezzaki Badou	78	0	1979–1992
6	Abdelmajid Dolmy	76	2	1973–1988
7	Youssef Chippo	73	9	1996–2006
7	Mohamed Hazzaz	73	0	1969–1979
9	Abdelkrim El Hadrioui	72	4	1992–2001
10	Mbark Boussoufa	70	8	2006–2019

== Goals ==
Rank	Player	Goals	Caps	Ratio	Career	Reference
1	Ahmed Faras	36	94	0.38	1966–1979	
2	Salaheddine Bassir	27	59	0.46	1994–2002	
3	Abdeljalil Hadda	19	48	0.4	1995–2002	
4	Hassan Amcharrat	18	39	0.46	1971–1979	
4	Marouane Chamakh	18	65	0.28	2003–2014	
6	Abdeslam Laghrissi	17	35	0.49	1984–1995	
6	Hakim Ziyech	25	40	0.41	2015–present	
8	Youssef El-Arabi	16	46	0.36	2010–present	
8	Youssouf Hadji	16	64	0.25	2003–2012	
10	Aziz Bouderbala	14	57	0.25	1979–1992	

== Captains ==
Player	Caps	Goals	Career
Mehdi Benatia	66	2	2015-2019
Romain Saiss			2019-present
