= Khor Fakkan Club =

Emirati professional football club

Khor Fakkan Club نادي خورفكان
- Full name: Khorfakkan Sports & Cultural Club نادي خورفكان الرياضي الثقافي
- Nickname: Al Nusur (The Eagles)
- Founded: 1981; 45 years ago as Al Khaleej; 2017; 9 years ago as Khorfakkan
- Ground: Saqr bin Mohammed Al Qasimi Stadium, Khor Fakkan
- Capacity: 6,132
- Chairman: Fahd bin Sultan bin Mohammed Al Qasimi
- Head coach: Krešimir Režić
- League: UAE Pro League
- 2025–26: UAE Pro League, 9th
- Website: khorfakkanfc.ae
Home colours	Away colours	Third colours

Khor Fakkan Club (Arabic: نادي خورفكان الرياضي الثقافي, formally known as Al Khaleej), usually known simply as Khor Fakkan, is an Emirati professional football club from Khor Fakkan.

== History ==
Founded in 1981, the club won a UAE Federation Cup in the 1993–94 season. In June 2017 the club was rebranded with a new name and logo now it is known as Khor Fakkan. The team were promoted back to the top flight in 2019 after winning the UAE Division 1, it was their first experience in the UAE Pro League since 2008.

== Pro-League record ==
Season	Div.	Tms.	Pos.	President's Cup	League Cup
2008–09	1	12	12th	Quarter-Finals	First Round
2009–10	2	8	6th	Round of 16	—
2010–11	2	8	6th	Preliminary Round	—
2011–12	2	8	5th	Round of 16	—
2012–13	2	14	8th	Preliminary Round	—
2013–14	2	13	6th	Preliminary Round	—
2014–15	2	11	9th	Preliminary Round	—
2015–16	2	9	8th	Preliminary Round	—
2016–17	2	12	7th	Preliminary Round	—
2017–18	2	12	5th	Preliminary Round	—
2018–19	2	10	1st	Preliminary Round	—
2019–20^{a}	1	14	12th	Round of 16	First Round
2020–21	1	14	10th	Round of 16	Quarter-Finals
2021–22	1	14	10th	Round of 16	First Round
2022–23	1	14	10th	Round of 16	Quarter-Finals

_{Notes 2019–20 UAE football season was cancelled due to the COVID-19 pandemic in the United Arab Emirates.}

Key

- Pos. = Position
- Tms. = Number of teams
- Lvl. = League

== Players ==
As of UAE Pro-League:

Note: Flags indicate national team as defined under FIFA eligibility rules; some limited exceptions apply. Players may hold more than one non-FIFA nationality.

No.	Pos.	Nation	Player
1	GK	UAE	Ahmed Al-Hosani
2	DF	UAE	Yousef Al-Ameri
3	DF	BRA	Kayque Campos
4	DF	BRA	Rafael Pereira
6	DF	MAR	Akram Nakach
7	MF	JAM	Junior Flemmings
8	MF	UAE	Abdullah Al-Naqbi
9	FW	MAR	Tarik Tissoudali
10	FW	POR	Aylton Boa Morte
11	DF	UAE	Ahmed Jshak
12	DF	MAR	Ilyass Lagrimi (on loan from Al Jazira Club)
13	MF	UAE	Ahmed Barman
16	DF	ARG	Pedro Pavlov
17	DF	UAE	Sultan Al-Zaabi
19	DF	BOL	Luis Haquín

No.	Pos.	Nation	Player
21	MF	MAR	Selim Amallah
22	FW	EGY	Yahya Yousri
23	DF	UAE	Saeed Ahmed Abdulla
25	MF	UAE	Khalid Al-Hanaai
34	DF	NED	Serano Seymor
50	GK	UAE	Rashed Ali
72	MF	GUI	Ahmadou Camara
77	MF	NGR	Rilwanu Sarki (on loan from Al-Ain)
79	MF	CIV	Jean N'Guessan
87	MF	UAE	Mohamed Al-Eter
90	FW	CIV	Adama Diallo (on loan from Al Wasl)
91	FW	UAE	Oumar Traoré (on loan from Al Jazira Club)
95	GK	UAE	Rashid Abdalla
96	GK	UAE	Rashed Al-Naour
—	MF	BOL	Ramiro Vaca (on loan from Wydad AC)

Players with Multiple Nationalities

- (United Arab Emirates) (Comoros) Ahmed Jshak

== Honours ==
The club has gained the following honours:

- UAE Federation Cup: 1
  - Winners: 1993–94
- UAE Division One: 6
  - Winners: 1978–79, 1981–82, 1993–94, 2000–01, 2007–08, 2018–19
- UAE President Cup
  - Runners-up: 1986–87

== Notable players ==
- (United Arab Emirates) Abdullah Ali Sultan
- (United Arab Emirates) Ismail Al Hammadi
- (United Arab Emirates) Khalil Ghanim
- (United Arab Emirates) Mubarak Ghanim
- (Uzbekistan) Temurkhuja Abdukholiqov
- (Iraq) Osama Rashid
- (Timor-Leste) Rodrigo Silva

== Club staff ==
Position	Name
Head coach	(Croatia) Krešimir Režić
Assistant coach	(Croatia) Ivica Sertic (United Arab Emirates) Saeed Yameen (United Arab Emirates) Abbas Abdul Ghani
Goalkeeper coach	(Croatia) Boško Knežević
Fitness coach	(Croatia) Luka Cikotic
Match analyst	(Bosnia and Herzegovina) Blazo Igumanovic
Performance analyst	(Brazil) Gabriel Da Costa
Team Doctor	(Tunisia) Mahmoud Refaei
Physiotherapist	(United Arab Emirates) Mohammed Noaman
Masseur	(United Arab Emirates) Mohammed Munir (United Arab Emirates) Khalid Shazli
Interpreter	(United Arab Emirates) Khalid Ayoub
Rehabilitation specialist	(United Arab Emirates) Omar Mostafa
Team manager	(United Arab Emirates) Anwar AlHammadi (United Arab Emirates) Nabeel Alnaqbi

== Futsal team ==
- UAE PRESIDENT CUP - FUTSAL: 1

Winners: 2012–2013

- UAE FUTSAL LEAGUE: 1

Winners: 2013–2014

- UAE Federation Cup: 1

Winners: 2013–2014

- UAE FUTSAL SUPER CUP: 1

Winners: 2014–2015

- UAE YOUTH FUTSAL CUP: 1

Winners: 2018.

== See also ==
- List of football clubs in the United Arab Emirates
