= 1988–89 First Vienna FC season =

Vienna
1988–89 season
- Coach: Ernst Dokupil
- Stadium: Hohe Warte Stadium, Vienna, Austria
- 1. Division: 5th
- ÖFB-Cup: Quarter-finals
- UEFA Cup: Second Round
- Top goalscorer: League: Andreas Heraf (9); All: Andreas Heraf (10); Alfred Drabits (10); Gerhard Steinkogler (10)
- Highest home attendance: 7,000
- Lowest home attendance: 1,000

The 1988–89 season ended for First Vienna FC with a fifth-place finish in the domestic league. This qualified the club for the 1989–90 UEFA Cup and was their second and up to now last appearance in a European competition.

== Squad ==
=== Squad and statistics ===
No.	Pos	Nat	Player	Total		1. Division		Austrian Cup		UEFA Cup	
No.	Pos	Nat	Player	Apps	Goals	Apps	Goals	Apps	Goals	Apps	Goals
Goalkeepers
	GK	(Austria) AUT	Gottfried Angerer	44	0	36	0	4	0	4	0
	GK	(Austria) AUT	Werner Hebenstreit	1	0	1	0	0	0	0	0
Defenders
	DF	(Austria) AUT	Thomas Niederstrasser	38	3	30	2	4	1	4	0
	DF	(Czechoslovakia) TCH	Jiří Ondra	41	1	33	1	4	0	4	0
	DF	(Hungary) HUN	Zoltán Péter	25	7	19	6	2	1	4	0
	DF	(Austria) AUT	Kurt Russ	43	6	35	6	4	0	4	0
	DF	(Austria) AUT	Christian Salaba	11	0	10	0	1	0	0	0
	DF	(Austria) AUT	Peter Webora	22	1	17	0	2	1	3	0
Midfielders
	MF	(Austria) AUT	Gerald Glatzmayer	41	9	34	7	3	0	4	2
	MF	(Austria) AUT	Andreas Heraf	41	10	34	9	3	1	4	0
	MF	(Austria) AUT	Ewald Jenisch	35	2	29	2	4	0	2	0
	MF	(Finland) FIN	Kimmo Lipponen	16	2	14	1	2	1	0	0
	MF	(Austria) AUT	Norbert Lindner	15	0	13	0	2	0	0	0
	MF	(Austria) AUT	Ernst Mader	38	6	32	6	3	0	3	0
	MF	(Austria) AUT	Josef Marko	12	0	8	0	3	0	1	0
	MF	(Austria) AUT	Helmut Slezak	17	2	15	1	1	1	1	0
	MF	(Austria) AUT	Stefan Szabo	3	0	3	0	0	0	0	0
Forwards
	FW	(Austria) AUT	Alfred Drabits	27	10	22	7	2	2	3	1
	FW	(Austria) AUT	Andreas Nader	5	0	5	0	0	0	0	0
	FW	(Austria) AUT	Gerald Schober	1	0	0	0	0	0	1	0
	FW	(Austria) AUT	Gerhard Steinkogler	42	10	34	7	4	2	4	1
	FW	(Austria) AUT	Günther Vidreis	42	4	35	4	3	0	4	0
