= 1989–90 First Vienna FC season =

Vienna
1989–90 season
- Coach: Ernst Dokupil (-1989); Felix Latzke (1990-)
- Stadium: Hohe Warte Stadium, Vienna, Austria
- 1. Division: 8th
- ÖFB-Cup: Semi-finals
- UEFA Cup: Second Round
- Top goalscorer: League: Gerald Glatzmayer (12); All: Gerald Glatzmayer (13)
- Highest home attendance: 5,000
- Lowest home attendance: 400

The 1989–90 season ended for First Vienna FC with an eighth-place finish in the domestic league. During this season the club played for their second time in a European competition when they have been eliminated in the second round of the 1989–90 UEFA Cup.

== Squad ==
=== Squad and statistics ===
No.	Pos	Nat	Player	Total		1. Division		Austrian Cup		UEFA Cup	
No.	Pos	Nat	Player	Apps	Goals	Apps	Goals	Apps	Goals	Apps	Goals
Goalkeepers
	GK	(Austria) AUT	Gottfried Angerer	36	0	30	0	3	0	3	0
	GK	(Austria) AUT	Helmut Fleischmann	9	0	7	0	1	0	1	0
Defenders
	DF	(Austria) AUT	Robert Haas	10	0	7	0	3	0	0	0
	DF	(Austria) AUT	Andreas Lipa	3	0	3	0	0	0	0	0
	DF	(Austria) AUT	Thomas Niederstrasser	21	3	18	2	0	0	3	1
	DF	(Czechoslovakia) TCH	Jiří Ondra	41	0	34	0	3	0	4	0
	DF	(Austria) AUT	Helmut Pfeiffer	4	0	3	0	1	0	0	0
	DF	(Austria) AUT	Kurt Russ	42	3	34	3	4	0	4	0
	DF	(Austria) AUT	René Ruziczka	1	0	0	0	0	0	1	0
	DF	(Austria) AUT	Christian Salaba	37	1	30	1	3	0	4	0
Midfielders
	MF	(Austria) AUT	Gerald Glatzmayer	38	13	30	12	4	1	4	0
	MF	(Austria) AUT	Roland Görbicz	2	1	2	1	0	0	0	0
	MF	(Austria) AUT	Anton Haiden	33	1	27	0	4	0	2	1
	MF	(Austria) AUT	Andreas Heraf	29	9	24	6	3	2	2	1
	MF	(Austria) AUT	Ewald Jenisch	39	4	32	1	3	1	4	2
	MF	(Austria) AUT	Norbert Lindner	11	0	8	0	1	0	2	0
	MF	(Austria) AUT	Ernst Mader	17	1	14	0	2	1	1	0
	MF	(Socialist Federal Republic of Yugoslavia) YUG	Ilija Sormaz	9	0	8	0	1	0	0	0
	MF	(Austria) AUT	Roman Wallner	4	0	4	0	0	0	0	0
Forwards
	FW	(West Germany) FRG	Ralf Balzis	34	11	28	7	2	1	4	3
	FW	(Austria) AUT	Alfred Drabits	32	6	28	5	2	1	2	0
	FW	(Austria) AUT	Gerhard Kammerhofer	19	1	14	0	3	1	2	0
	FW	(Socialist Federal Republic of Yugoslavia) YUG	Goran Petronijević	7	0	6	0	1	0	0	0
	FW	(Austria) AUT	Roland Rath	2	0	2	0	0	0	0	0
	FW	(Austria) AUT	Gerald Schober	25	5	19	5	3	0	3	0
	FW	(Austria) AUT	Gerhard Steinkogler	22	7	19	6	3	1	0	0
	FW	(Austria) AUT	Günther Vidreis	37	3	30	2	3	0	4	1
