= 1987–88 First Vienna FC season =

Vienna
1987–88 season
- Coach: Ernst Dokupil
- Stadium: Hohe Warte Stadium, Vienna, Austria
- 1. Division: 4th
- ÖFB-Cup: Quarter-finals
- Top goalscorer: League: Gerhard Steinkogler (15); All: Gerhard Steinkogler (18)
- Highest home attendance: 13,000 (at Gerhard Hanappi Stadium)
- Lowest home attendance: 1,000

The 1987–88 First Vienna FC season was probably the most successful season in club history since 1954–55. Under coach Ernst Dokupil the team finished fourth in the domestic league and qualified for the 1988–89 UEFA Cup. This was their first appearance in a European competition.

== Squad ==
=== Squad and statistics ===
No.	Pos	Nat	Player	Total		1. Division		Austrian Cup	
No.	Pos	Nat	Player	Apps	Goals	Apps	Goals	Apps	Goals
Goalkeepers
	GK	(Austria) AUT	Werner Hebenstreit	37	0	34	0	3	0
	GK	(Austria) AUT	Hosrt Kirasitsch	2	0	2	0	0	0
Defenders
	DF	(Austria) AUT	Wolfgang Kienast	28	8	27	7	1	1
	DF	(Austria) AUT	Thomas Niederstrasser	37	2	34	1	3	1
	DF	(Czechoslovakia) TCH	Jiří Ondra	39	1	36	1	3	0
	DF	(Hungary) HUN	Zoltán Péter	30	8	28	8	2	0
	DF	(Austria) AUT	Kurt Russ	16	3	13	3	3	0
	DF	(Austria) AUT	Peter Webora	1	1	1	1	0	0
Midfielders
	MF	(Austria) AUT	Fritz Drazan	13	0	13	0	0	0
	MF	(Austria) AUT	Gerald Glatzmayer	28	3	25	2	3	1
	MF	(Austria) AUT	Andreas Herzog	8	3	7	3	1	0
	MF	(Austria) AUT	Ewald Jenisch	37	2	34	2	3	0
	MF	(Austria) AUT	Tino Jessenitschnig	22	4	18	2	4	2
	MF	(Austria) AUT	Norbert Lindner	15	0	13	0	2	0
	MF	(Austria) AUT	Peter Pospischil	9	0	9	0	0	0
	MF	(Austria) AUT	Helmut Slezak	32	12	28	11	4	1
	MF	(Austria) AUT	Peter Stöger	39	7	36	6	3	1
	MF	(Austria) AUT	Stefan Szabo	8	0	8	0	0	0
	MF	(Austria) AUT	Rudi Weinhofer	10	0	10	0	0	0
Forwards
	FW	(Austria) AUT	Horst Baumgartner	29	3	28	3	1	0
	FW	(Austria) AUT	Dieter Kienbacher	6	2	6	2	0	0
	FW	(Austria) AUT	Andreas Nader	7	0	7	0	0	0
	FW	(Austria) AUT	Gerald Schober	9	1	7	1	2	0
	FW	(Austria) AUT	Gerhard Steinkogler	40	18	36	15	4	3
