= 1990 FIFA World Cup discipline =

Aspect of the 1990 FIFA World Cup

In the 1990 FIFA World Cup the main disciplinary action taken against players came in the form of red and yellow cards. Any player picking up a red card is automatically banned for his country's next game (if it is a serious offense FIFA may extend this ban to a number of games). Players also receive a one-game ban if they pick up two yellow cards within the group stage or within the knockout stage.

== Disciplinary statistics ==
- Total number of yellow cards: 193
- Average number of yellow cards: 3.71
- Total number of red cards: 16
- Average number of red cards: 0.31
- First yellow card: Benjamin Massing – Cameroon against Argentina
- First red card: André Kana-Biyik – Cameroon vs Argentina
- Fastest yellow card from kick off: 4 minutes – Marius Lăcătuş – Romania vs Argentina
- Fastest yellow card after coming on as a substitute: 1 minute – Peter Beardsley – England vs. Egypt
- Latest yellow card in a match without extra time: 90 minutes + – Ernst Aigner – Austria vs. Czechoslovakia
- Fastest dismissal from kick off: 34 minutes – Peter Artner – Austria vs United States
- Fastest dismissal of a substitute: 6 minutes – Andreas Reisinger – Austria vs United States
- Latest dismissal in a match without extra time: 89 minutes – Benjamin Massing – Cameroon against Argentina
- Least time difference between two yellow cards given to the same player: 0 minutes – Yoon Deuk-Yeo – Korea Republic against Uruguay (Yoon was given two yellow cards in the 70th minute)
- Most yellow cards (team): 21 – Argentina
- Most red cards (team): 3 – Argentina
- Fewest yellow cards (team): 2 – Belgium
- Most yellow cards (player): 3 – (three players) Benjamin Massing, Yoon Deuk-Yeo, Frank Rijkaard
- Most red cards (player): 1 – (16 players) Ricardo Giusti, Eric Wynalda, Peter Artner, Frank Rijkaard, Rudi Völler, Yoon Deuk-Yeo, Ľubomír Moravčík, Ricardo Gomes, Benjamin Massing, André Kana-Biyik, Volodymyr Bezsonov, Khalil Ghanim, Refik Šabanadžović, Eric Gerets, Gustavo Dezotti, Pedro Monzón
- Most yellow cards (match): 9 – Austria vs United States (Group A)
- Most red cards (match): 2 – West Germany vs Netherlands (round of 16)
- Most cards in one match: 9 yellow cards and 1 red card – Austria vs United States (Group A)

== Sanctions ==
=== By referee ===
Referee	Matches	Red	Yellow	Red Cards
(Austria) Helmut Kohl	4	1	15	1 second yellow
(Brazil) José Ramiz Wright	4	0	11	
(France) Michel Vautrot	3	3	13	1 straight red 2 second yellow
(Mexico) Edgardo Codesal	3	2	11	1 straight red 1 second yellow
(Italy) Tullio Lanese	3	1	16	1 second yellow
(France) Joël Quiniou	3	1	9	1 straight red
(Argentina) Juan Carlos Loustau	2	2	7	2 second yellow
(Switzerland) Kurt Röthlisberger	2	2	11	1 straight red 1 second yellow
(East Germany) Siegfried Kirschen	2	1	8	1 second yellow
(Uruguay) Juan Daniel Cardellino	2	0	8	
(Northern Ireland) Alan Snoddy	2	0	8	
(Germany) Aron Schmidhuber	2	0	7	
(Portugal) Carlos Silva Valente	2	0	7	
(Socialist Federal Republic of Yugoslavia) Zoran Petrović	2	0	4	
(Denmark) Peter Mikkelsen	2	0	2	
(Syria) Jamal Al Sharif	1	1	9	1 straight red 2 second yellow
(Sweden) Erik Fredriksson	1	1	5	1 straight red
(Japan) Shizuo Takada	1	1	5	1 second yellow
(Italy) Pierluigi Pairetto	1	0	7	
(Scotland) George Smith	1	0	6	
(Tunisia) Neji Jouini	1	0	4	
(England) George Courtney	1	0	3	
(Chile) Hernán Silva	1	0	3	
(Ecuador) Elías Jácome	1	0	3	
(Soviet Union) Alexey Spirin	1	0	3	
(Portugal) Carlos Maciel	1	0	2	
(Spain) Emilio Soriano Aladrén	1	0	2	
(Belgium) Marcel van Langenhove	1	0	2	
(Italy) Luigi Agnolin	1	0	1	
(United States) Vincent Mauro	1	0	1	
Total	52	16	193	6 straight red 11 second yellow

=== By team ===
Team	Yellow	Red	Red Cards	Suspensions
Argentina	24	3	R. Giusti vs Italy; 2nd yellow card G. Dezotti vs West Germany (final); 2nd yellow card P. Monzón vs West Germany (final) straight red card	J. Serrizuela vs Brazil; P. Monzón vs Yugoslavia (quarter finals); S. Batista vs West Germany (final); C. Caniggia vs West Germany (final); R. Giusti vs West Germany (final); J. Olarticoechea vs West Germany (final)
Austria	10	1	P. Artner vs United States straight red card	
Belgium	2	1	E. Gerets vs Uruguay; 2nd yellow card	E. Gerets vs Spain
Brazil	7	1	R. Gomes vs Argentina straight red card	Mozer vs Scotland
Cameroon	15	2	B. Massing vs Argentina; 2nd yellow card A. Kana-Biyik vs Argentina straight red card	B. Massing vs Romania; A. Kana-Biyik vs Romania
Colombia	5	0		
Costa Rica	10	0		R. Gómez vs Czechoslovakia
Czech Republic	6	1	Ľ. Moravčík vs West Germany; 2nd yellow card	L. Kubík vs Italy
Egypt	4	0		
England	5	0		P. Gascoigne vs Italy (Match for third place)
Italy	6	0		N. Berti vs Republic of Ireland
Korea Republic	8	1	D.Y. Yoon vs Uruguay	
Netherlands	5	1	F. Rijkaard vs West Germany; 2nd yellow card	
Republic of Ireland	5	0		C. Morris vs Netherlands
Romania	12	0		M. Lăcătuş vs Republic of Ireland (round of 16)
Scotland	3	0		
Soviet Union	3	1	V. Bezsonov vs Argentina	V. Bezsonov vs Cameroon
Spain	4	0		
Sweden	4	0		
United Arab Emirates	7	1	K. Ghanim vs Yugoslavia; 2nd yellow card	
Uruguay	9	0		
United States	7	1	E. Wynalda vs Czechoslovakia straight red card	E. Wynalda vs Austria
West Germany	9	1	R. Völler vs Netherlands (round of 16); 2nd yellow card	A. Brehme vs Colombia; R. Völler vs Czechoslovakia (Quarter finals)
Yugoslavia	9	1	R. Šabanadžović vs Argentina; 2nd yellow card	

=== By individual ===
1 red card

- (Argentina) Gustavo Dezotti
- (Argentina) Ricardo Giusti
- (Argentina) Pedro Monzón
- (Austria) Peter Artner
- (Belgium) Eric Gerets
- (Brazil) Ricardo Gomes
- (Cameroon) André Kana-Biyik
- (Cameroon) Benjamin Massing
- (Czech Republic) Ľubomír Moravčík
- (South Korea) Yoon Deuk-Yeo
- (Netherlands) Frank Rijkaard
- (United Arab Emirates) Khalil Ghanim
- (Soviet Union) Volodymyr Bezsonov
- (United States) Eric Wynalda
- (Germany) Rudi Völler
- (Socialist Federal Republic of Yugoslavia) Refik Šabanadžović

3 yellow cards

- (Argentina) Ricardo Giusti
- (Cameroon) Benjamin Massing
- (Czech Republic) Ľubomír Moravčík
- (West Germany) Andreas Brehme
- (West Germany) Rudi Völler
- (South Korea) Yoon Deuk-Yeo
- (Netherlands) Frank Rijkaard
- (Socialist Federal Republic of Yugoslavia) Refik Šabanadžović

2 yellow cards

- (Argentina) Sergio Batista
- (Argentina) Claudio Caniggia
- (Argentina) Gustavo Dezotti
- (Argentina) Diego Maradona
- (Argentina) Pedro Monzón
- (Argentina) Julio Olarticoechea
- (Argentina) José Serrizuela
- (Argentina) Pedro Troglio
- (Austria) Robert Pecl
- (Austria) Manfred Zsak
- (Belgium) Eric Gerets
- (Brazil) Mozer
- (Cameroon) André Kana-Biyik
- (Cameroon) Emile M'Bouh
- (Cameroon) Roger Milla
- (Cameroon) Victor N'Dip
- (Cameroon) Thomas N'Kono
- (Cameroon) Jules Onana
- (Colombia) Gabriel Gómez
- (Costa Rica) Róger Gómez
- (Costa Rica) Hector Marchena
- (Czech Republic) Luboš Kubík
- (Czech Republic) František Straka
- (England) Paul Gascoigne
- (West Germany) Rudi Völler
- (Republic of Ireland) Chris Morris
- (Italy) Nicola Berti
- (Romania) Gheorghe Hagi
- (Romania) Marius Lăcătuş
- (United Arab Emirates) Khalil Ghanim
- (United Arab Emirates) Yousuf Hussain
- (United States) Jimmy Banks
- (Uruguay) José Perdomo

1 yellow card

- (Argentina) Jorge Burruchaga
- (Argentina) Sergio Goycochea
- (Argentina) Oscar Ruggeri
- (Argentina) Roberto Sensini
- (Argentina) Juan Simón
- (Austria) Ernst Aigner
- (Austria) Gerald Glatzmeyer
- (Austria) Andreas Herzog
- (Austria) Klaus Lindenberger
- (Austria) Anton Pfeffer
- (Austria) Andreas Reisinger
- (Brazil) Branco
- (Brazil) Dunga
- (Brazil) Mauro Galvão
- (Brazil) Jorginho
- (Brazil) Ricardo Rocha
- (Colombia) Leonel Álvarez
- (Colombia) Luis Fernando Herrera
- (Colombia) Luis Carlos Perea
- (Costa Rica) Rónald González Brenes
- (Costa Rica) Claudio Jara
- (Czech Republic) Michal Bílek
- (Czech Republic) Jozef Chovanec
- (Czech Republic) Ivan Hašek
- (Czech Republic) Miroslav Kadlec
- (Czech Republic) Ivo Knoflíček
- (Czech Republic) Ján Kocian
- (Czech Republic) Tomáš Skuhravý
- (Egypt) Magdi Abdelghani
- (Egypt) Ibrahim Hassan
- (Egypt) Ahmed Ramzy
- (Egypt) Ahmed Shobair
- (England) Peter Beardsley
- (England) Steve McMahon
- (England) Paul Parker
- (England) Stuart Pearce
- (West Germany) Thomas Berthold
- (West Germany) Jürgen Klinsmann
- (West Germany) Lothar Matthäus
- (Italy) Roberto Baggio
- (Italy) Luigi De Agostini
- (Italy) Riccardo Ferri
- (Italy) Giuseppe Giannini
- (South Korea) Choi Kang-Hee
- (South Korea) Choi Soon-Ho
- (South Korea) Chung Hae-Won
- (South Korea) Hwangbo Kwan
- (South Korea) Lee Heung-Sil
- (Netherlands) Wim Kieft
- (Netherlands) Marco van Basten
- (Netherlands) Jan Wouters
- (Republic of Ireland) John Aldridge
- (Republic of Ireland) Paul McGrath
- (Republic of Ireland) Kevin Moran
- (Romania) Michael Klein
- (Romania) Ioan Lupescu
- (Romania) Dănuţ Lupu
- (Scotland) Mo Johnston
- (Scotland) Murdo MacLeod
- (Scotland) David McPherson
- (Soviet Union) Vagiz Khidiyatullin
- (Soviet Union) Oleh Protasov
- (Soviet Union) Andrei Zygmantovich
- (Spain) Chendo
- (Spain) Manuel Jiménez Jiménez
- (Spain) Roberto
- (Spain) Francisco Villarroya
- (Sweden) Joakim Nilsson
- (Sweden) Stefan Schwarz
- (Sweden) Glenn Strömberg
- (Sweden) Jonas Thern
- (United Arab Emirates) Hussain Ghuloum
- (United Arab Emirates) Eissa Meer
- (United Arab Emirates) Ibrahim Meer
- (Uruguay) Fernando Álvez
- (Uruguay) Enzo Francescoli
- (Uruguay) Nelson Gutiérrez
- (Uruguay) José Herrera
- (Uruguay) José Pintos Saldanha
- (United States) Paul Caligiuri
- (United States) Tony Meola
- (United States) Bruce Murray
- (United States) Steve Trittschuh
- (United States) Mike Windischmann
- (Socialist Federal Republic of Yugoslavia) Dragoljub Brnović
- (Socialist Federal Republic of Yugoslavia) Srečko Katanec
- (Socialist Federal Republic of Yugoslavia) Darko Pančev
- (Socialist Federal Republic of Yugoslavia) Dragan Stojković
- (Socialist Federal Republic of Yugoslavia) Zlatko Vujović
- (Socialist Federal Republic of Yugoslavia) Zoran Vulić
