= 1990 FIFA World Cup Group A =

Football tournament group stage

Play in Group A of the 1990 FIFA World Cup completed on 19 June 1990. Italy won the group and advanced to the second round, along with Czechoslovakia. Austria and the United States failed to advance.

== Standings ==
| Pos | Team | Pld | W | D | L | GF | GA | GD | Pts | Qualification |
|---|---|---|---|---|---|---|---|---|---|---|
| 1 | Italy (H) | 3 | 3 | 0 | 0 | 4 | 0 | +4 | 6 | Advance to knockout stage |
| 2 | Czechoslovakia | 3 | 2 | 0 | 1 | 6 | 3 | +3 | 4 | Advance to knockout stage |
| 3 | Austria | 3 | 1 | 0 | 2 | 2 | 3 | −1 | 2 | |
| 4 | United States | 3 | 0 | 0 | 3 | 2 | 8 | −6 | 0 | |

Source: FIFA
Rules for classification: Group stage tiebreakers
(H) Hosts

== Matches ==
All times local (CEST/UTC+2)

=== Italy vs Austria ===
9 June 1990
21:00

| Italy | 1–0 | Austria |
|---|---|---|
| Schillaci 78' |

Stadio Olimpico, Rome
Attendance: 73,303
Referee: José Roberto Wright (Brazil)

| Italy | Austria |

| GK | 1 | Walter Zenga |
| DF | 2 | Franco Baresi |
| DF | 3 | Giuseppe Bergomi (c) |
| DF | 6 | Riccardo Ferri |
| DF | 7 | Paolo Maldini |
| MF | 9 | Carlo Ancelotti | (substituted off) 46' |
| MF | 11 | Fernando De Napoli |
| MF | 13 | Giuseppe Giannini |
| MF | 17 | Roberto Donadoni |
| FW | 21 | Gianluca Vialli |
| FW | 16 | Andrea Carnevale | (substituted off) 75' |
Substitutions:
| GK | 12 | Stefano Tacconi |
| DF | 4 | Luigi De Agostini | (substituted on) 46' |
| DF | 8 | Pietro Vierchowod |
| FW | 15 | Roberto Baggio |
| FW | 19 | Salvatore Schillaci | (substituted on) 75' |
Manager:
Azeglio Vicini

| GK | 1 | Klaus Lindenberger |
| DF | 2 | Ernst Aigner |
| DF | 7 | Kurt Russ |
| DF | 3 | Robert Pecl |
| DF | 5 | Peter Schöttel |
| DF | 18 | Michael Streiter |
| MF | 8 | Peter Artner | | (substituted off) 61' |
| MF | 10 | Manfred Linzmaier | | (substituted off) 77' |
| MF | 20 | Andreas Herzog | (yellow card) 6' |
| FW | 13 | Andreas Ogris |
| FW | 9 | Toni Polster (c) |
Substitutions:
| GK | 21 | Michael Konsel |
| DF | 4 | Anton Pfeffer |
| MF | 6 | Manfred Zsak | | (substituted on) 61' |
| MF | 11 | Alfred Hörtnagl | | (substituted on) 77' |
| FW | 14 | Gerhard Rodax |
Manager:
Josef Hickersberger

Assistant referees:
Armando Pérez-Hoyos (Colombia)
Carlos Silva Valente (Portugal)

=== United States vs Czechoslovakia ===
10 June 1990
17:00

| United States | 1–5 | Czechoslovakia |
|---|---|---|
| Caligiuri 60' | | Skuhravý 26', 78'; Bílek 40' (pen.); Hašek 50'; Luhový 90+3' |

Stadio Comunale, Florence
Attendance: 33,266
Referee: Kurt Röthlisberger (Switzerland)

| United States | Czechoslovakia |

| GK | 1 | Tony Meola | (yellow card) 39' |
| DF | 2 | Steve Trittschuh | (yellow card) 43' |
| DF | 5 | Mike Windischmann (c) |
| DF | 15 | Desmond Armstrong |
| MF | 6 | John Harkes |
| MF | 20 | Paul Caligiuri |
| MF | 7 | Tab Ramos |
| MF | 14 | John Stollmeyer | | (substituted off) 64' |
| FW | 10 | Peter Vermes |
| FW | 11 | Eric Wynalda | (red card) 52' |
| FW | 16 | Bruce Murray | | (substituted off) 79' |
Substitutions:
| GK | 22 | David Vanole |
| DF | 8 | Brian Bliss |
| FW | 9 | Christopher Sullivan | | (substituted on) 79' |
| FW | 13 | Eric Eichmann |
| DF | 17 | Marcelo Balboa | | (substituted on) 64' |
Manager:
Bob Gansler

| GK | 1 | Jan Stejskal |
| DF | 5 | Ján Kocian |
| DF | 3 | Miroslav Kadlec | (yellow card) 61' |
| DF | 9 | Luboš Kubík | (yellow card) 30' |
| DF | 6 | František Straka |
| MF | 4 | Ivan Hašek (c) |
| MF | 11 | Ľubomír Moravčík | | (substituted off) 83' |
| MF | 8 | Jozef Chovanec |
| MF | 7 | Michal Bílek |
| FW | 10 | Tomáš Skuhravý |
| FW | 17 | Ivo Knoflíček | | (substituted off) 77' |
Substitutions:
| GK | 21 | Luděk Mikloško |
| MF | 14 | Vladimír Weiss | | (substituted on) 83' |
| MF | 18 | Milan Luhový | | (substituted on) 77' |
| FW | 19 | Stanislav Griga |
| MF | 20 | Václav Němeček |
Manager:
Jozef Vengloš

Assistant referees:
Marcel Van Langenhove (Belgium)
Aron Schmidhuber (West Germany)

=== Italy vs United States ===
14 June 1990
21:00

| Italy | 1–0 | United States |
|---|---|---|
| Giannini 11' |

Stadio Olimpico, Rome
Attendance: 73,423
Referee: Edgardo Codesal (Mexico)

| Italy | United States |

| GK | 1 | Walter Zenga |
| DF | 2 | Franco Baresi |
| DF | 3 | Giuseppe Bergomi (c) |
| DF | 6 | Riccardo Ferri | (yellow card) 69' |
| DF | 7 | Paolo Maldini |
| MF | 10 | Nicola Berti |
| MF | 17 | Roberto Donadoni |
| MF | 11 | Fernando De Napoli |
| MF | 13 | Giuseppe Giannini |
| FW | 16 | Andrea Carnevale | | (substituted off) 51' |
| FW | 21 | Gianluca Vialli |
Substitutions:
| GK | 12 | Stefano Tacconi |
| DF | 4 | Luigi De Agostini |
| DF | 8 | Pietro Vierchowod |
| FW | 15 | Roberto Baggio |
| FW | 19 | Salvatore Schillaci | | (substituted on) 51' |
Manager:
Azeglio Vicini

| GK | 1 | Tony Meola |
| DF | 3 | John Doyle |
| DF | 4 | Jimmy Banks | (yellow card) 62' | (substituted off) 80' |
| DF | 5 | Mike Windischmann (c) |
| DF | 15 | Desmond Armstrong |
| DF | 17 | Marcelo Balboa |
| MF | 6 | John Harkes |
| MF | 7 | Tab Ramos |
| MF | 20 | Paul Caligiuri |
| FW | 10 | Peter Vermes |
| FW | 16 | Bruce Murray | | (substituted off) 82' |
Substitutions:
| GK | 18 | Kasey Keller |
| DF | 2 | Steve Trittschuh |
| DF | 8 | Brian Bliss |
| FW | 9 | Christopher Sullivan | | (substituted on) 82' |
| DF | 14 | John Stollmeyer | | (substituted on) 80' |
Manager:
Bob Gansler

Assistant referees:
Berny Ulloa Morera (Costa Rica)
Juan Daniel Cardellino (Uruguay)

=== Austria vs Czechoslovakia ===
15 June 1990
17:00

| Austria | 0–1 | Czechoslovakia |
|---|---|---|
| | | Bílek 31' (pen.) |

Stadio Comunale, Florence
Attendance: 38,962
Referee: George Smith (Scotland)

| Austria | Czechoslovakia |

| GK | 1 | Klaus Lindenberger |
| DF | 2 | Ernst Aigner |
| DF | 3 | Robert Pecl | (yellow card) 22' |
| DF | 4 | Anton Pfeffer | (yellow card) 85' |
| DF | 7 | Kurt Russ | | (substituted off) 46' |
| MF | 6 | Manfred Zsak | (yellow card) 71' |
| MF | 5 | Peter Schöttel | | (substituted off) 46' |
| MF | 20 | Andreas Herzog |
| MF | 11 | Alfred Hörtnagl |
| FW | 14 | Gerhard Rodax |
| FW | 9 | Toni Polster (c) |
Substitutions:
| GK | 21 | Michael Konsel |
| MF | 13 | Andreas Ogris | | (substituted on) 46' |
| MF | 16 | Andreas Reisinger |
| DF | 18 | Michael Streiter | | (substituted on) 46' |
| MF | 19 | Gerald Glatzmayer |
Manager:
Josef Hickersberger

| GK | 1 | Jan Stejskal |
| DF | 5 | Ján Kocian |
| DF | 3 | Miroslav Kadlec |
| DF | 9 | Luboš Kubík | (yellow card) 62' |
| MF | 4 | Ivan Hašek (c) |
| MF | 20 | Václav Němeček |
| MF | 11 | Ľubomír Moravčík | (yellow card) 52' |
| MF | 8 | Jozef Chovanec | | (substituted off) 31' |
| MF | 7 | Michal Bílek |
| FW | 10 | Tomáš Skuhravý |
| FW | 17 | Ivo Knoflíček | | (substituted off) 81' |
Substitutions:
| GK | 21 | Luděk Mikloško |
| DF | 2 | Július Bielik | | (substituted on) 31' |
| MF | 14 | Vladimír Weiss | | (substituted on) 81' |
| MF | 18 | Milan Luhový |
| FW | 19 | Stanislav Griga |
Manager:
Jozef Vengloš

Assistant referees:
Richard Lorenc (Australia)
Jamal Al Sharif (Syria)

=== Italy vs Czechoslovakia ===
19 June 1990
21:00

| Italy | 2–0 | Czechoslovakia |
|---|---|---|
| Schillaci 9'; Baggio 78' |

Stadio Olimpico, Rome
Attendance: 73,303
Referee: Joël Quiniou (France)

| Italy | Czechoslovakia |

| GK | 1 | Walter Zenga |
| DF | 2 | Franco Baresi |
| DF | 3 | Giuseppe Bergomi (c) |
| DF | 6 | Riccardo Ferri |
| DF | 7 | Paolo Maldini |
| MF | 10 | Nicola Berti | (yellow card) 70' |
| MF | 17 | Roberto Donadoni | | (substituted off) 51' |
| MF | 11 | Fernando De Napoli | | (substituted off) 65' |
| MF | 13 | Giuseppe Giannini |
| FW | 15 | Roberto Baggio | (yellow card) 44' |
| FW | 19 | Salvatore Schillaci |
Substitutions:
| GK | 12 | Stefano Tacconi |
| DF | 4 | Luigi De Agostini | | (substituted on) 51' |
| DF | 8 | Pietro Vierchowod | | (substituted on) 65' |
| MF | 14 | Giancarlo Marocchi |
| FW | 20 | Aldo Serena |
Manager:
Azeglio Vicini

| GK | 1 | Jan Stejskal |
| DF | 3 | Miroslav Kadlec |
| DF | 15 | Vladimír Kinier |
| DF | 4 | Ivan Hašek (c) |
| DF | 20 | Václav Němeček | | (substituted off) 46' |
| MF | 11 | Ľubomír Moravčík |
| MF | 8 | Jozef Chovanec | (yellow card) 26' |
| MF | 14 | Vladimír Weiss | | (substituted off) 58' |
| MF | 7 | Michal Bílek |
| FW | 10 | Tomáš Skuhravý | (yellow card) 30' |
| FW | 17 | Ivo Knoflíček |
Substitutions:
| GK | 21 | Luděk Mikloško |
| DF | 2 | Július Bielik | | (substituted on) 46' |
| MF | 13 | Jiří Němec |
| MF | 16 | Viliam Hýravý |
| FW | 19 | Stanislav Griga | | (substituted on) 58' |
Manager:
Jozef Vengloš

Assistant referees:
Marcel van Langenhove (Belgium)
George Smith (Scotland)

=== Austria vs United States ===
19 June 1990
21:00

| Austria | 2–1 | United States |
|---|---|---|
| Ogris 49'; Rodax 63' | | Murray 83' |

Stadio Comunale, Florence
Attendance: 34,857
Referee: Jamal Al Sharif (Syria)

| Austria | United States |

| GK | 1 | Klaus Lindenberger | (yellow card) 84' |
| DF | 2 | Ernst Aigner |
| DF | 3 | Robert Pecl | (yellow card) 31' |
| DF | 4 | Anton Pfeffer |
| MF | 8 | Peter Artner | (red card) 33' |
| MF | 6 | Manfred Zsak | (yellow card) 21' |
| MF | 20 | Andreas Herzog |
| MF | 13 | Andreas Ogris |
| MF | 18 | Michael Streiter | (yellow card) 90' |
| FW | 9 | Toni Polster (c) | | (substituted off) 46' |
| FW | 14 | Gerhard Rodax | | (substituted off) 86' |
Substitutions:
| GK | 21 | Michael Konsel |
| DF | 7 | Kurt Russ |
| FW | 15 | Christian Keglevits |
| MF | 16 | Andreas Reisinger | (yellow card) 50' | (substituted on) 46' |
| MF | 19 | Gerald Glatzmayer | | (substituted on) 86' |
Manager:
Josef Hickersberger

| GK | 1 | Tony Meola |
| DF | 3 | John Doyle |
| DF | 4 | Jimmy Banks | (yellow card) 28' | (substituted off) 55' |
| DF | 5 | Mike Windischmann (c) | (yellow card) 58' |
| DF | 15 | Desmond Armstrong |
| DF | 17 | Marcelo Balboa |
| MF | 6 | John Harkes |
| MF | 7 | Tab Ramos |
| MF | 20 | Paul Caligiuri | (yellow card) 26' | (substituted off) 70' |
| FW | 10 | Peter Vermes |
| FW | 16 | Bruce Murray | (yellow card) 42' |
Substitutions:
| GK | 18 | Kasey Keller |
| DF | 2 | Steve Trittschuh |
| DF | 8 | Brian Bliss | | (substituted on) 70' |
| FW | 11 | Eric Wynalda | | (substituted on) 55' |
| DF | 14 | John Stollmeyer |
Manager:
Bob Gansler

Assistant referees:
Richard Lorenc (Australia)
Zoran Petrović (Yugoslavia)

== See also ==
- Austria at the FIFA World Cup
- Czech Republic at the FIFA World Cup
- Italy at the FIFA World Cup
- Slovakia at the FIFA World Cup
- United States at the FIFA World Cup
