= Kožichovice =

- Municipality
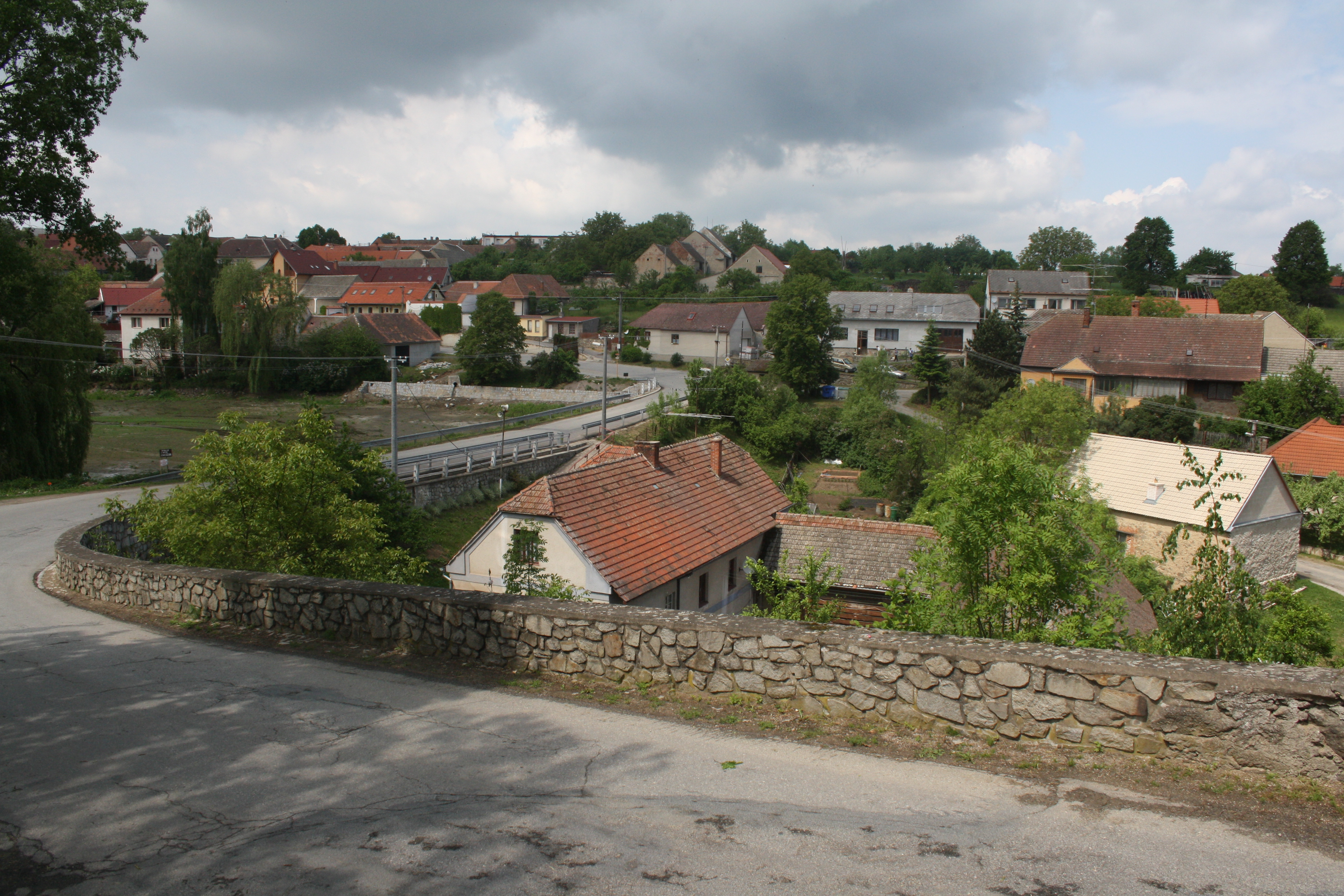
- View towards the centre of the village

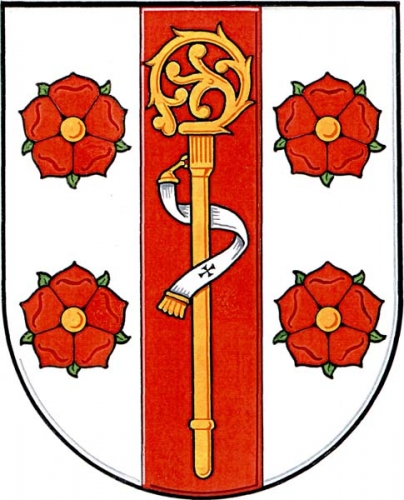
- Flag Coat of arms

- Location in the Czech Republic
- Coordinates: 49°12′0″N 15°55′19″E
- Country: Czech Republic
- Region: Vysočina
- District: Třebíč
- First mentioned: 1104

Area
  - Total: 10.64 km^{2} (4.11 sq mi)
- Elevation: 465 m (1,526 ft)

Population (2026-01-01)
  - Total: 479
  - Density: 45.0/km^{2} (117/sq mi)
- Time zone: UTC+1 (CET)
  - Summer (DST): UTC+2 (CEST)
- Postal code: 674 01
- Website: www.kozichovice.cz

Kožichovice is a municipality and village in Třebíč District in the Vysočina Region of the Czech Republic. It has about 500 inhabitants.

Kožichovice lies approximately 5 kilometres (3 mi) south-east of Třebíč, 34 km (21 mi) south-east of Jihlava, and 147 km (91 mi) south-east of Prague.

== Demographics ==
Historical population
Year	Pop.	±%
1869	361	—
1880	400	+10.8%
1890	417	+4.2%
1900	436	+4.6%
1910	465	+6.7%
1921	450	−3.2%
1930	465	+3.3%
1950	389	−16.3%
1961	390	+0.3%
1970	384	−1.5%
1980	376	−2.1%
1991	362	−3.7%
2001	352	−2.8%
2011	369	+4.8%
2021	440	+19.2%
Source: Censuses

== Notable people ==
- Mathias Zdarsky (1856–1940), pioneer of alpine skiing
