= Muckenkogel =

Mountain in Austria

Coordinates: 47°59′N 15°37′E

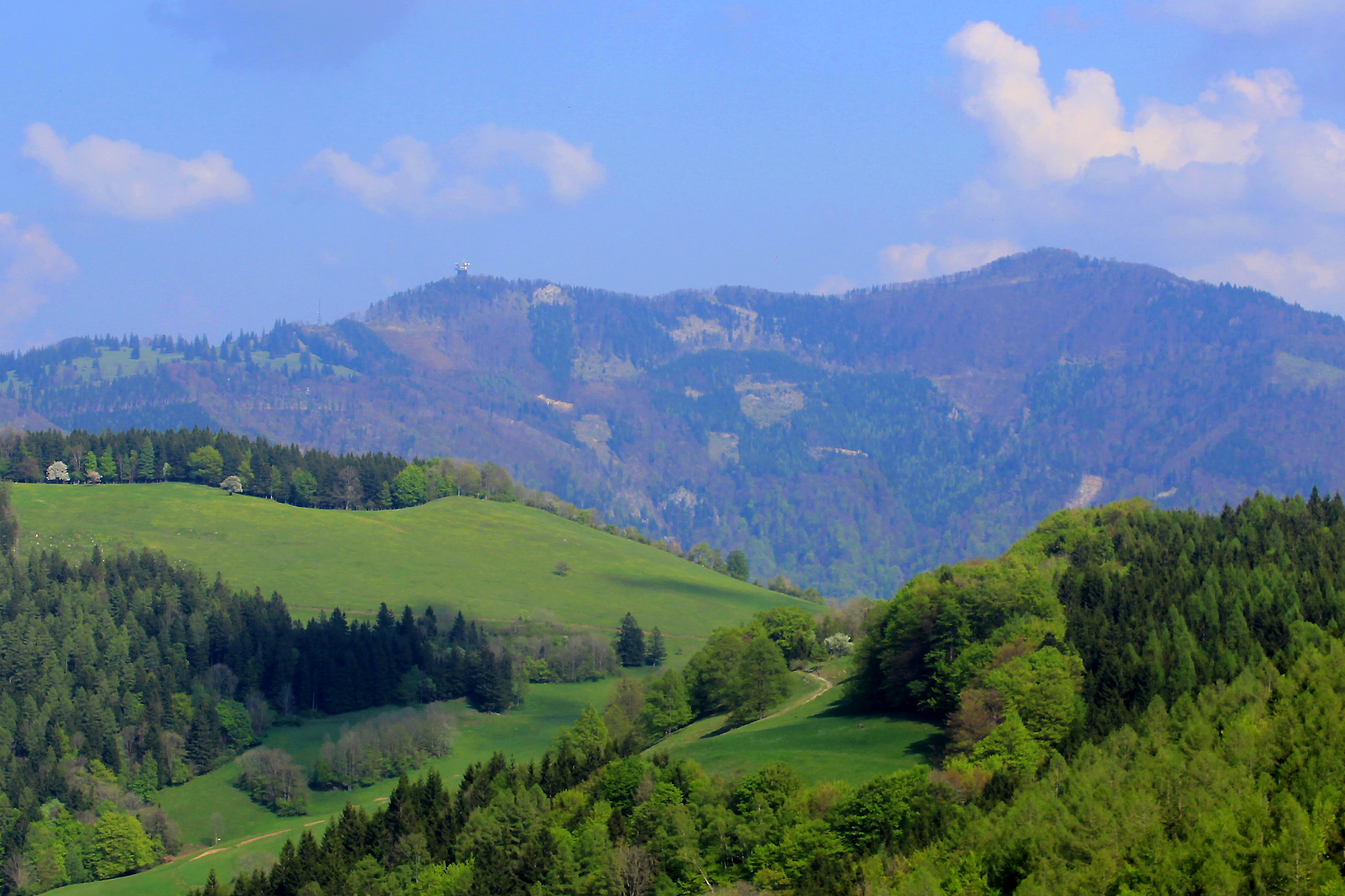
MuckenkogelHinteralm

Muckenkogel is a part of the Gutensteiner Alps in the Austrian province of Lower Austria. Rising 4095 feet above sea level (1248 meters), the mountain is one of several close to the historic city of Lilienfeld. Muckenkogel is accessible by many well-marked paths as well as a single-seater chair lift. The chair lift is one of only 109 operating single chair lifts in the world and one of seven operating in Austria. Muckenkogel is of historical significance due to the Czech-born ski pioneer Mathias Zdarsky. On March 19, 1905 the first official Alpine Ski Race was held on Muckenkogel. It was won by Zdarsky. Today, the mountain is a spot for hiking, mountain biking, as well as paragliding.
