= Mathias Zdarsky =

Alpine skier (1856–1940)

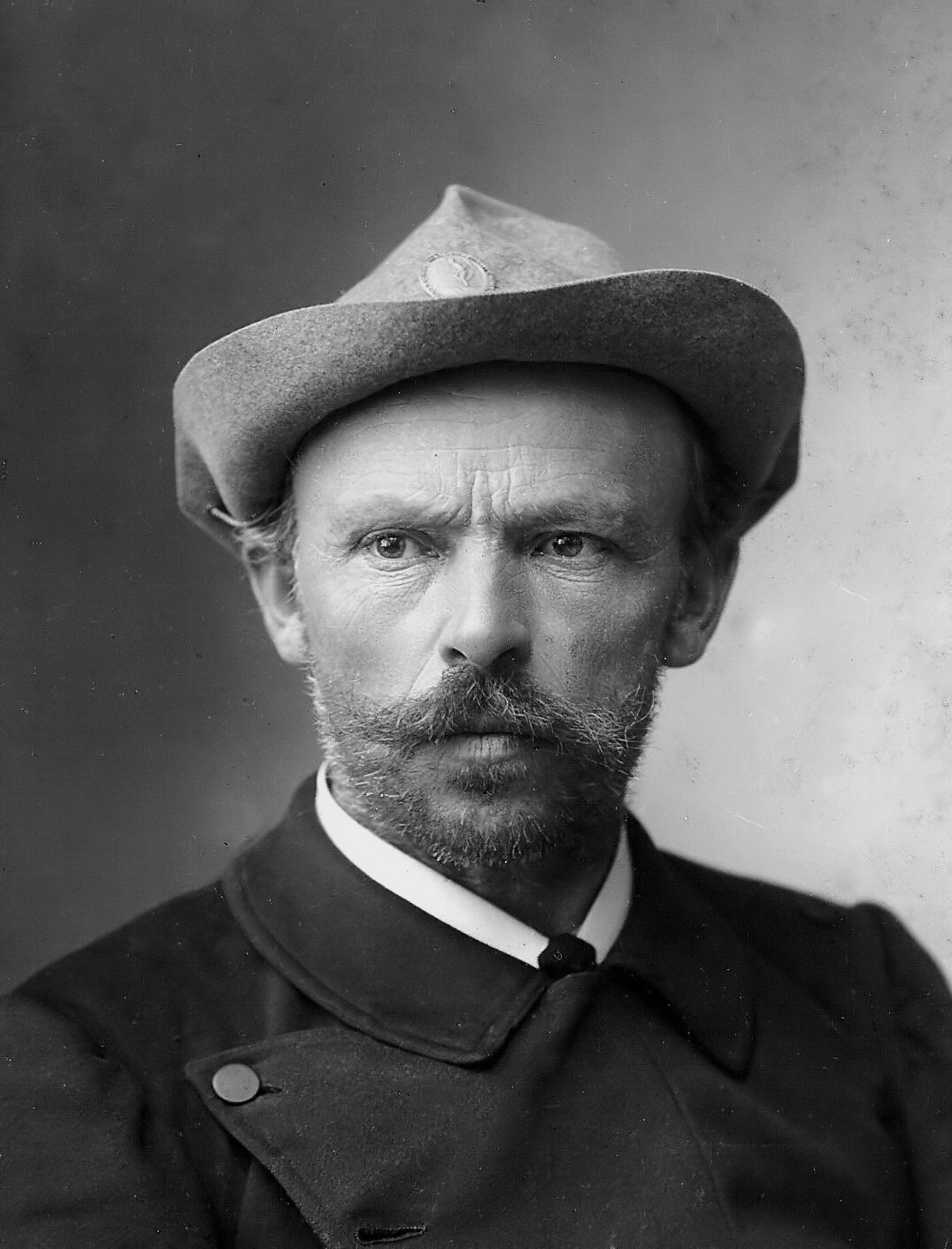
- Zdarsky in 1908
- Born: 25 February 1856; Kožichovice, Moravia
- Died: 20 June 1940 (aged 84); St. Pölten, Austria
- Occupations: Ski instructor, artist
- Known for: "Father of alpine skiing" Inventor of steel ski binding

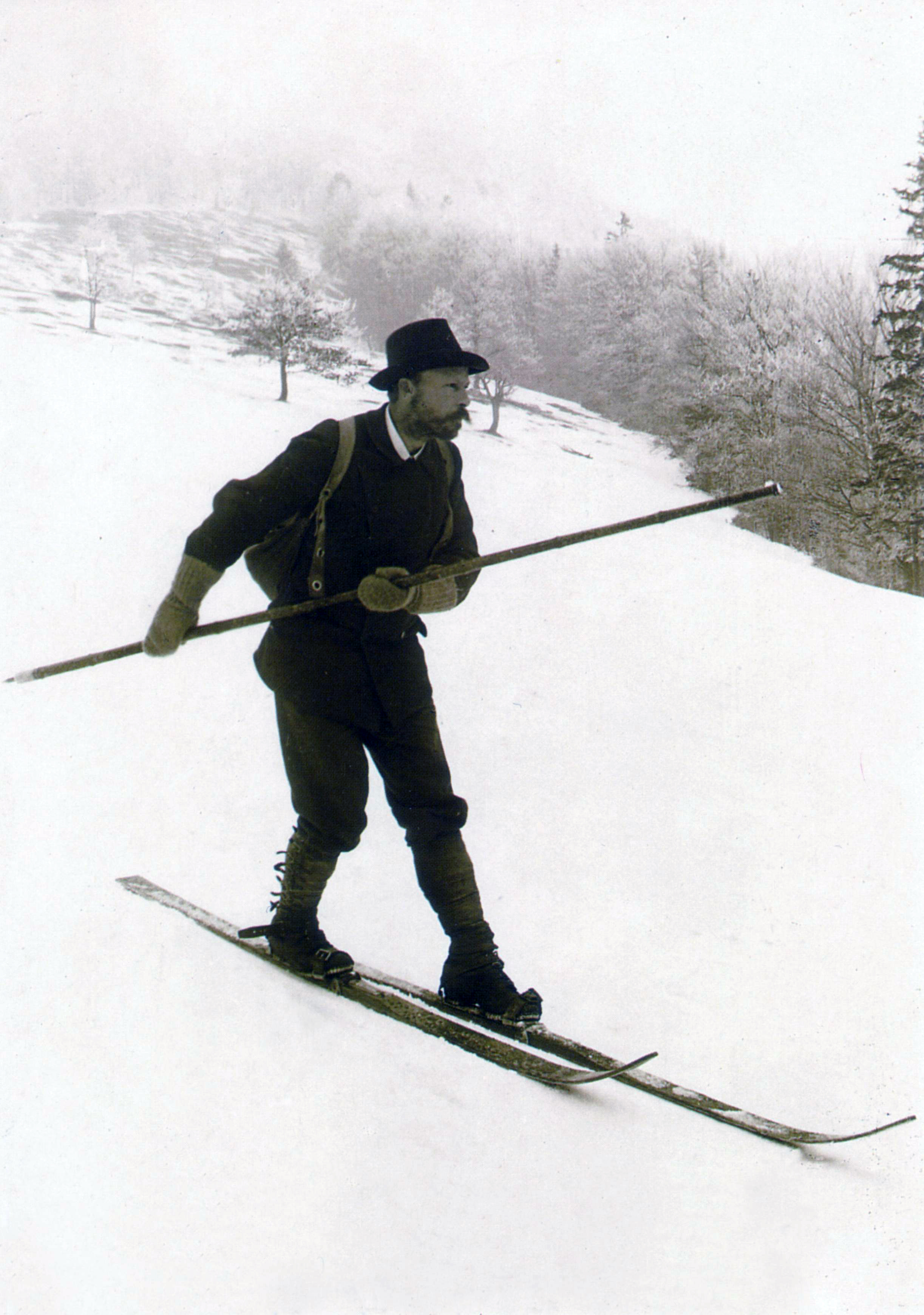
Zdarsky demonstrating his ski technique. This photo was the basis of a 1990 commemorative Austrian 5 schilling stamp.

Mathias Zdarsky (Czech: Matyáš Žďárský; 25 February 1856 – 20 June 1940) was an early ski pioneer and founder of modern Alpine skiing technique: Arnold Lunn described him as the "father of alpine skiing". He was the first ski instructor in the world. He was also a teacher, painter and sculptor.

== Biography ==
Zdarsky was born on 25 February 1856 in Kožichovice in Moravia, then the Austrian Empire, present-day Czech Republic.

Inspired by Norway's Fridtjof Nansen's 1888 crossing of Greenland, he adapted skis for use on alpine terrain. In 1890, he developed a steel binding (the "Lilienfelder Stahlsohlenbindung"), which made steep mountain slopes and gate runs possible. Zdarsky felt the earlier bindings did not hold the foot firmly enough, and so he designed binding with a strong, sprung, steel sole, which is the basis of modern ski bindings. As in the earlier Norwegian skiing, he used only one ski pole. Unlike today, the skier steered by using their elbows.

In January 1905, Zdarsky demonstrated a steep downhill descent, and was among the first to publicize this development in Central Europe. To show the superiority of his ski technology, he skied the "Breite Ries" at Schneeberg, Austria. On 19 March 1905 he organized the first alpine ski race (on the Muckenkogel via Lilienfeld, Austria) (though Crans-Montana in Switzerland had already run the first Kandahar descent race, in January 1901). This event had 24 participants, however it attained little attention beyond ski enthusiasts. In 1922 the Englishman Arnold Lunn invented the shorter, but more difficult slalom race, which had greater appeal.

During World War I, he taught mountain troops skiing and advanced avalanche training. He described his skiing techniques in his book Die Lilienfelder Skilauf-Technik (The Lilienfelder Ski Method). First published in 1897, seventeen editions were published up to 1925. He died in St. Pölten, Austria on 20 June 1940.

== Legacy ==
During his lifetime, nobody suspected Zdarsky had created the basis for a popular sport, and he was considered something of an eccentric inventor. He is also thought to be the inventor of the bivouac sack.

Honors received include:

- 1905 honorary member of Ski Club of Great Britain
- 1916 Knight's Cross Order of Franz Joseph
- 1931 Gold Medal for Services to the Republic of Austria
- 1936 Cross of the Austrian Order of Merit
- 1937 honorary member of Austrian Ski Association
- 1965 monument in Lilienfeld park

Named in his memory:

- Mount Zdarsky in Antarctica
- 1951 Zdarskyweg in Vienna - Hietzing
- 1977 Zdarskystraße in St. Pölten- Spratzern
- annual Muckenkogel Traisner Hütte mid-March nostalgia ski race
- double black diamond trail at Taos Ski Valley
