= Lilienfeld =

- Municipality
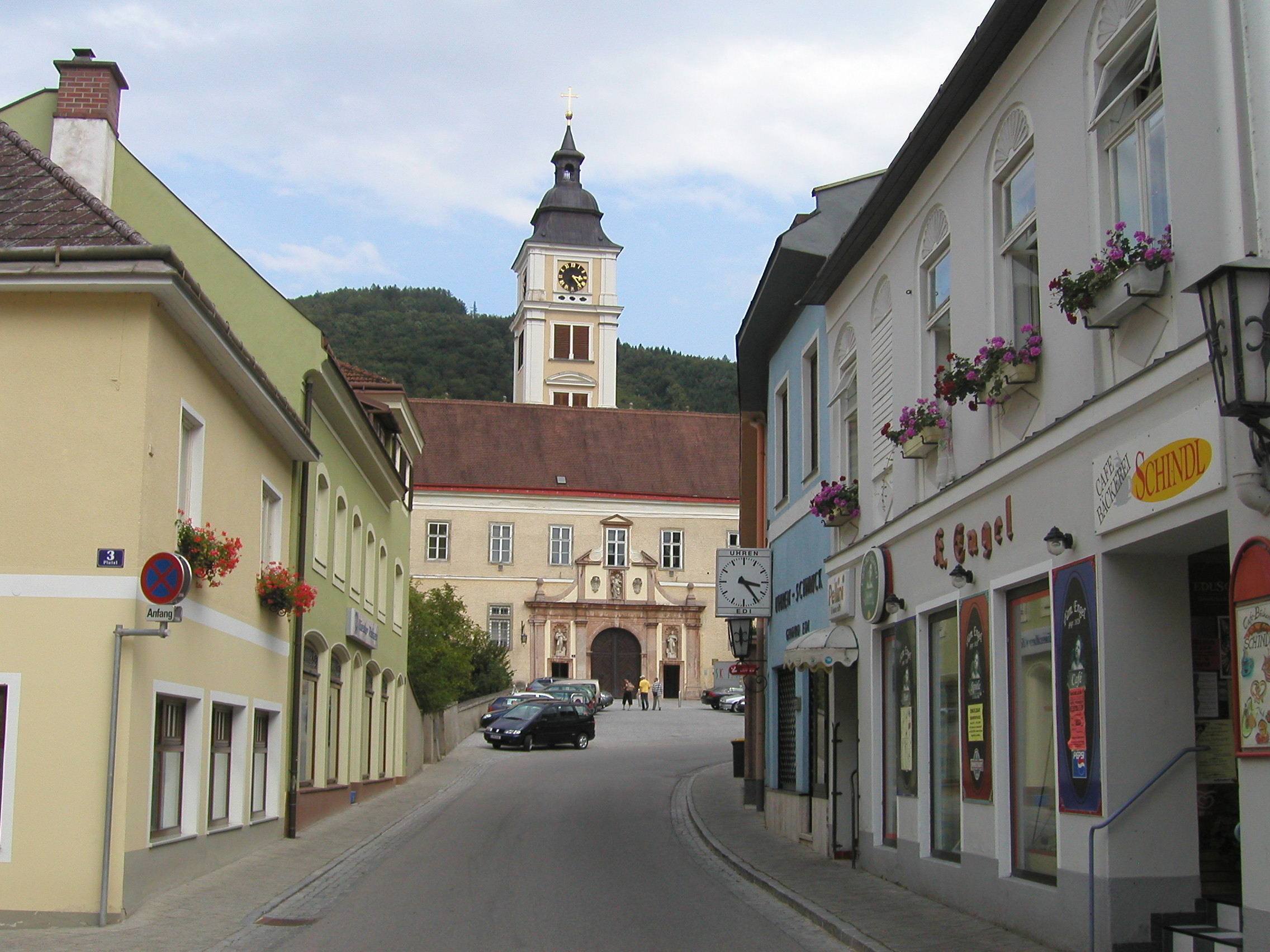
- Town center

- Coat of arms

- Location within Austria
- Coordinates: 48°00′48″N 15°35′53″E
- Country: Austria
- State: Lower Austria
- District: Lilienfeld

Government
  - Mayor: Manuel Aichberger (ÖVP)

Area
  - Total: 53.93 km^{2} (20.82 sq mi)
- Elevation: 383 m (1,257 ft)

Population (2018-01-01)
  - Total: 2,833
  - Density: 52.53/km^{2} (136.1/sq mi)
- Time zone: UTC+1 (CET)
  - Summer (DST): UTC+2 (CEST)
- Postal code: 3180
- Area code: 02762
- Vehicle registration: LF
- Website: www.lilienfeld.at

Lilienfeld (Austrian German pronunciation: [ˈliːliənfɛld]) is a city in Lower Austria (Niederösterreich), Austria, south of St. Pölten, noted as the site of Lilienfeld Abbey. It is also the site of a regional hospital Landesklinikum Voralpen Lilienfeld. The city is located in the valley of the Traisen River. Lilienfeld is in the province which the Ancient Romans called Noricum. Just a short distance past Lilienfeld Abbey, one can find the chair lift station that brings travelers to the top of Muckenkogel, a mountain in the Gutenstein Alps, at the height of 4,095 feet (1,248 meters). On 19 March 1905, Muckenkogel was the site of the first official Alpine Ski Race, which was won by ski pioneer, Czech-born Mathias Zdarsky.

== Demographics ==
Historical population
Year	Pop.	±%
1971	3,149	—
1981	3,014	−4.3%
1991	2,807	−6.9%
2001	3,021	+7.6%
2011	2,832	−6.3%
2021	2,649	−6.5%
2025	2,618	−1.2%

== Politics ==
The municipal council (Gemeinderat) consists of 21 members. Since the 2025 local elections, it is made up of the following parties:

- Austrian People's Party (ÖVP): 14 seats
- Social Democratic Party of Austria (SPÖ): 5 seats
- Freedom Party of Austria (FPÖ): 2 seats

== Notable people ==
- Leo Karner (born 1952), former cyclist, competed in the team time trial event at the 1976 Summer Olympics
- Anton Pfeffer (born 1965), footballer who has played 396 games for FK Austria Wien and 63 for Austria
- Philipp Lienhart (born 1996), footballer who has played over 230 games and 20 for Austria

== Twin cities ==
- (Czech Republic) Třebíč
- (Japan) Jōetsu
