= 1990 FIFA World Cup final =

World Cup final, held in Italy

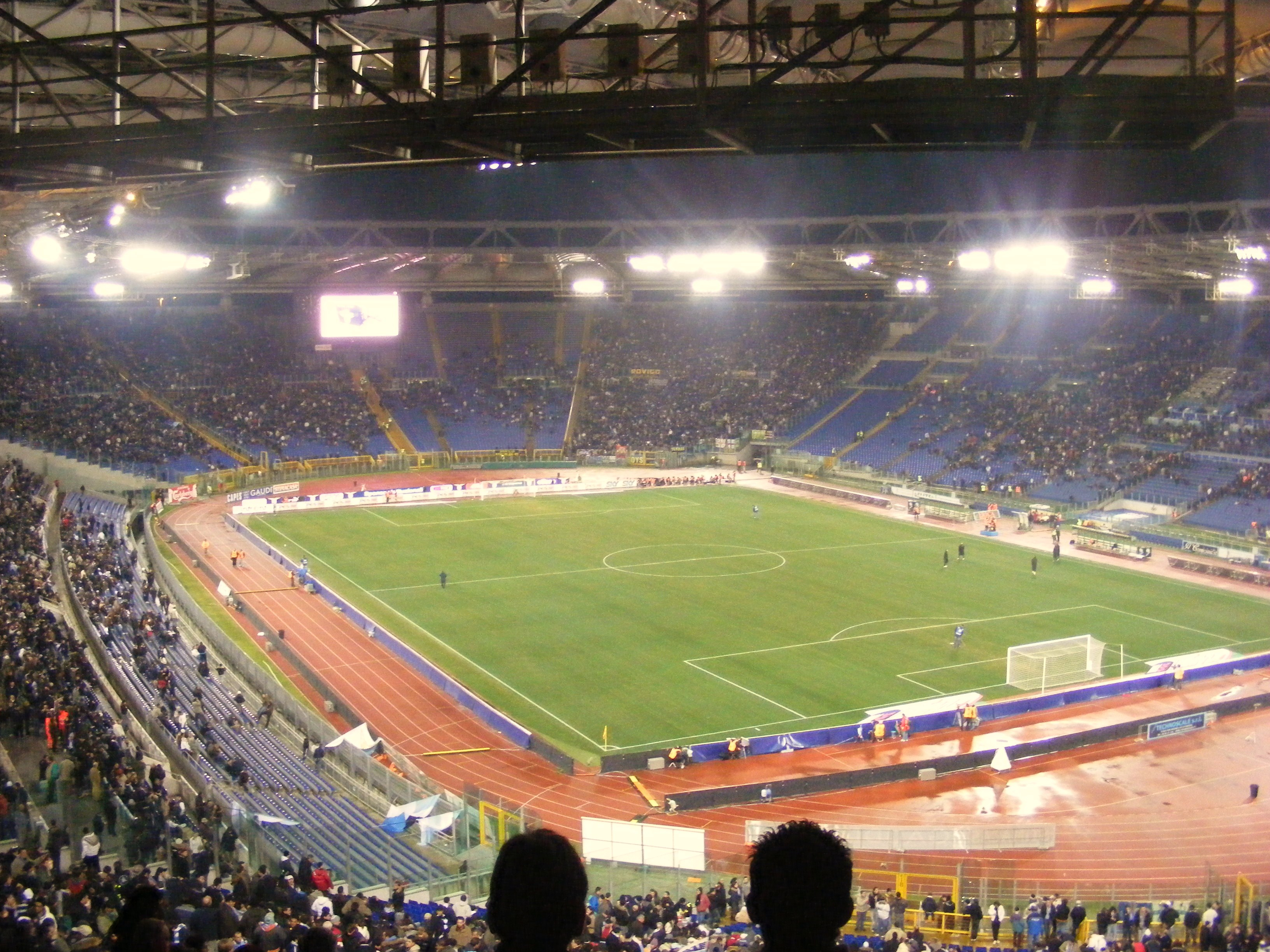
- The final was played at the Stadio Olimpico
- Event: 1990 FIFA World Cup
West Germany	Argentina
1	0
- Date: 8 July 1990
- Venue: Stadio Olimpico, Rome
- Referee: Edgardo Codesal (Mexico)
- Attendance: 73,603
- Weather: 26 °C (79 °F); 65% humidity

The 1990 FIFA World Cup final was a football match played between West Germany and Argentina to determine the winner of the 1990 FIFA World Cup. The game took place on 8 July at the Stadio Olimpico in Italy's capital and largest city, Rome, and was won 1–0 by West Germany, with a late penalty kick taken by Andreas Brehme being the game's only goal.

The match marked several firsts in FIFA World Cup history. This was the first rematch of a final and, to date, the only back-to-back rematch, as Argentina defeated West Germany in the previous final. Argentina became both the first team to fail to score in a World Cup final and the first defending champion to lose in the final. West Germany's victory over Argentina marked the first time a UEFA side had defeated a CONMEBOL side in a final in six attempts (South Americans had won all five previous finals between the two continents).

West Germany became the first team to play in three consecutive finals (they played in the 1982 and 1986 finals), a feat only repeated by Brazil in 1994, 1998, and 2002. It was West Germany's last World Cup match; the team played three more games before a unified German team was formed later in 1990, as a result of the reunification of the country after more than 40 years on October 3, 1990.

== Route to the final ==
West Germany
Round
Argentina
Opponent
Result
First round
Opponent
Result
Yugoslavia
4–1
Match 1
Cameroon
0–1
United Arab Emirates
5–1
Match 2
Soviet Union
2–0
Colombia
1–1
Match 3
Romania
1–1

Team	Pld	W	D	L	GF	GA	GD	Pts
West Germany	3	2	1	0	10	3	+7	5
Yugoslavia	3	2	0	1	6	5	+1	4
Colombia	3	1	1	1	3	2	+1	3
United Arab Emirates	3	0	0	3	2	11	−9	0

Final standing

Team	Pld	W	D	L	GF	GA	GD	Pts
Cameroon	3	2	0	1	3	5	−2	4
Romania	3	1	1	1	4	3	+1	3
Argentina	3	1	1	1	3	2	+1	3
Soviet Union	3	1	0	2	4	4	0	2

Opponent
Result
Knockout stage
Opponent
Result
Netherlands
2–1
Round of 16
Brazil
1–0
Czechoslovakia
1–0
Quarter-finals
Yugoslavia
0–0 (a.e.t.) (3–2 pen.)
England
1–1 (a.e.t.) (4–3 pen.)
Semi-finals
Italy
1–1 (a.e.t.) (4–3 pen.)

== Match ==
=== Summary ===
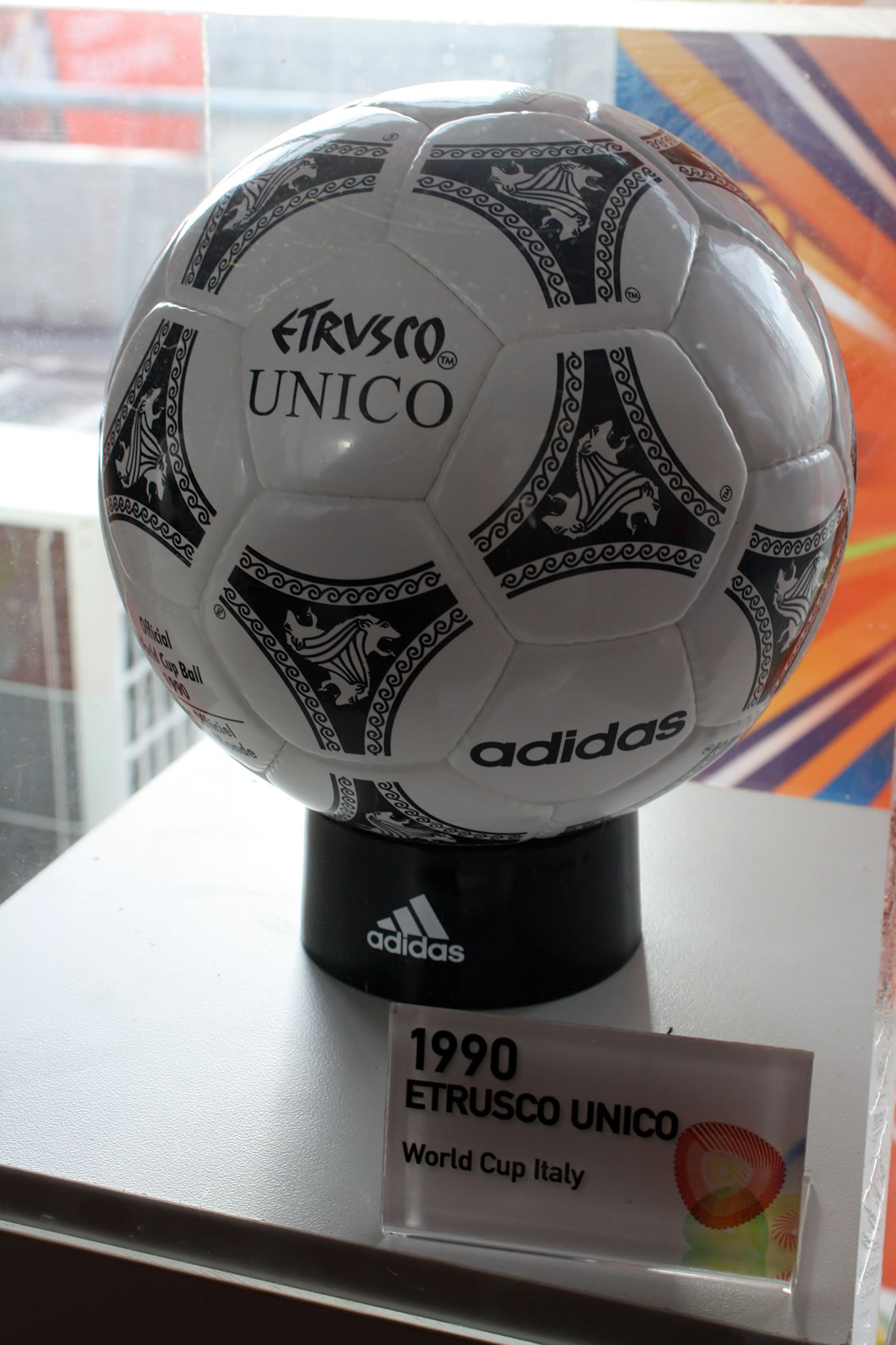
An example of the Adidas Etrusco Unico ball used in the match

The 1990 final is often cited as one of the most cynical and ugliest World Cup finals. It was an ill-tempered game, notable for the first two sendings off in a World Cup final. Ian Morrison wrote "the game did little for football but there was one consolation: Had the Argentines lifted the World Cup – with two wins and five goals in their seven matches – it would have been a catastrophe for the game. At least their awful approach to Italia '90 had gone unrewarded." Gianni Brera wrote in his match report for la Repubblica, "Mai assistito a uno strazio paragonabile a quello di Germania-Argentina" (lit. transl. 'I’ve never witnessed a more agonising match than Germany v Argentina').

The West Germany team attacked relentlessly from the beginning of the match. In the 3rd minute, Rudi Völler, who had been forced off with a leg injury in the semi-final against England, had the first clear-cut opportunity to score from close range following a free-kick cross by Andreas Brehme, but his off-balance toe punt went off target. West Germany won another free kick in a more dangerous position two minutes later when Pierre Littbarski was fouled in the penalty arc. Brehme's shot hit the wall and Klaus Augenthaler's follow-up long-range strike was saved by Argentine goalkeeper Sergio Goycochea. In the 8th and 12th minutes, Völler's header and Littbarski's curl shot went high and wide of the goal, respectively. In the 13th minute, Völler failed to receive Brehme's outswinging cross, and the ball supposedly struck the arm of the Argentina defender Oscar Ruggeri. The Mexican referee Edgardo Codesal refused to award a penalty kick despite Jürgen Klinsmann's appealing for handball. Five minutes later, Völler appeared to be taken down in the Argentine penalty area, but Codesal indicated to play on. In the 23rd minute, West German captain Lothar Matthäus's cross found Völler and his header was again wide of the target. In the 38th minute, Argentina gained a dangerous free kick when José Basualdo was fouled by Guido Buchwald. Argentina's captain Diego Maradona's kick went up and over the wall but couldn't dip back to be on target. At half-time, the score was still level at 0–0.

The West Germans had a few chances at the start of the second half. Littbarski cut inside, dribbling past three South American defenders, but his shot from outside the box went just wide. Later, Thomas Berthold and Rudi Völler, respectively, failed to capitalize from dangerous free kicks taken by Andreas Brehme. In the 58th minute, Argentine goalkeeper Sergio Goycochea blatantly took down Klaus Augenthaler inside the penalty area, but the referee Edgardo Codesal again refused to award a penalty kick. Pedro Monzón had the distinction of being the first player to be sent off at a FIFA World Cup final, after being shown a straight red card for a reckless studs up challenge on Jürgen Klinsmann; FIFA had warned its officials to enforce the rules and Monzón had raised his foot during the tackle, a foul that left a 15-centimetre (6 in) gash on Klinsmann's shin. In the 78th minute, after an incorrectly given corner kick, West German captain Matthäus lost the ball inside his own penalty area and then appeared to trip Gabriel Calderón. Codesal once again said to play on, amid penalty shouts from the Argentinian midfielder.

Six minutes from full time, Codesal incurred the wrath of the Argentinians after awarding West Germany a questionable penalty kick for Roberto Sensini's sliding tackle on Völler. Regular penalty taker Matthäus had been forced to replace his boots during the match and did not feel comfortable in the new ones, so Andreas Brehme took his place and converted the spot kick with a low, right-footed shot to the goalkeeper's right.

Gustavo Dezotti, already cautioned in the first half, received a straight red card late in the match when he hauled down Jürgen Kohler with what The New York Times described as a "neck tackle right out of professional wrestling", after Kohler refused to give-up the ball in an alleged attempt to waste time. After dismissing Dezotti, Codesal was surrounded and jostled by the rest of the Argentinian team, with Maradona receiving a yellow card for dissent. At the final whistle, Maradona, who was man marked by Guido Buchwald for almost the entire match, burst into tears and blamed the referee for the loss. Argentina entered the game with four players suspended and ended it with nine men on the field, overall losing over half their squad due to injury or suspension.

In total, West Germany had 16 scoring chances out of 23 shots. German head coach Franz Beckenbauer said "There were no doubts whatsoever who was going to win. For 90 minutes we attacked Argentina and there was no feeling of any danger that a goal would be scored against us. As I saw it, we outplayed them from beginning to end." Beckenbauer said that the penalty "was not the key to the game because in any case we would have scored, even if it had taken overtime... 1–0 by a penalty doesn't give a fair idea of this game. We could have won, 3–0. I don't remember a single chance Argentina had to score a goal."

Argentina became the competition's first finalist not to score, with only one shot on goal. The South Americans failed to put together a coherent attacking strategy and lost the ball frequently. Instead, they focused on defending at all costs, knowing they would have the advantage if they managed to reach the penalty shoot-out, as they had already advanced twice in the tournament by this means. The 1990 final was the lowest-scoring final in the history of the competition until the next final four years later saw Brazil beat Italy on penalties after 120 goalless minutes.

The 1990 victory gave West Germany their third FIFA World Cup title, also making them the team to have played in the most FIFA World Cup finals at the time (three wins, three defeats), as well as avenging their defeat at the hands of Argentina in the previous final. It also meant that Germany coach Franz Beckenbauer became the only person to have won both silver and gold medals at the World Cup as a player (1966, 1974) and as a coach (1986, 1990), and he also won a bronze medal as a player (1970). Having won on penalties against England in the semi-finals, West Germany became the first team to have won by that method en route to the title. This was repeated by Brazil (1994), France (1998), Italy (2006), and Argentina (twice in 2022, including the final).

=== Details ===
8 July 1990
20:00 UTC+2

West Germany	1–0	Argentina
Brehme 85' (pen.)

Stadio Olimpico, Rome
Attendance: 73,603
Referee: Edgardo Codesal (Mexico)

West Germany	Argentina

GK	1	Bodo Illgner
SW	5	Klaus Augenthaler
CB	6	Guido Buchwald
CB	4	Jürgen Kohler
RWB	14	Thomas Berthold		(substituted off) 73'
LWB	3	Andreas Brehme
CM	8	Thomas Häßler
CM	10	Lothar Matthäus (c)
CM	7	Pierre Littbarski
CF	9	Rudi Völler	(yellow card) 52'
CF	18	Jürgen Klinsmann
Substitutes:
GK	12	Raimond Aumann
DF	2	Stefan Reuter		(substituted on) 73'
FW	13	Karl-Heinz Riedle
MF	15	Uwe Bein
MF	20	Olaf Thon
Manager:
Franz Beckenbauer

GK	12	Sergio Goycochea
SW	20	Juan Simón
CB	18	José Serrizuela
CB	19	Oscar Ruggeri		(substituted off) 46'
RWB	4	José Basualdo
LWB	17	Roberto Sensini
DM	13	Néstor Lorenzo
CM	7	Jorge Burruchaga		(substituted off) 53'
CM	21	Pedro Troglio	(yellow card) 84'
SS	10	Diego Maradona (c)	(yellow card) 87'
CF	9	Gustavo Dezotti	(yellow card) 5' (red card) 87'
Substitutes:
GK	22	Fabián Cancelarich
FW	3	Abel Balbo
DF	5	Edgardo Bauza
MF	6	Gabriel Calderón		(substituted on) 53'
DF	15	Pedro Monzón	(red card) 65'	(substituted on) 46'
Manager:
Carlos Bilardo

Linesmen:
Armando Pérez Hoyos (Colombia)
Michał Listkiewicz (Poland)

Match rules:

- 90 minutes
- 30 minutes of extra-time if necessary
- Penalty shoot-out if scores still level
- Five substitutes named, two of which may be used

== See also ==
- Argentina at the FIFA World Cup
- Germany at the FIFA World Cup
