= Florián Monzón =

Argentine professional footballer

Personal information
- Full name: Florián Gonzalo de Jesús Monzón
- Date of birth: 3 January 2001 (age 25)
- Place of birth: Aguilares, Argentina
- Height: 1.84 m (6 ft 0 in)
- Position: Forward

Team information
- Current team: Atlas
- Number: 9

Youth career
- 2015–2020: Vélez Sarsfield

Senior career*
Years	Team	Apps	(Gls)
2020–2026	Vélez Sarsfield	26	(7)
2021	→ Platense (loan)	6	(0)
2022	→ Almirante Brown (loan)	33	(5)
2023	→ Portland Timbers 2 (loan)	21	(10)
2024	→ Central Córdoba SdE (loan)	16	(2)
2024	→ Tigre (loan)	13	(6)
2026–	Atlas	11	(4)

International career
2019	Argentina U18		
- * Club domestic league appearances and goals as of 05:25, 27 October 2026 (UTC)

Florián Gonzalo de Jesús Monzón (born 3 January 2001) is an Argentine professional footballer who plays as a centre-forward for Liga MX club Atlas.

== Club career ==
Monzón signed for Vélez Sarsfield in 2015, going on to score over forty goals in their academy. Mauricio Pellegrino promoted the centre-forward into his first-team squad in 2020, as he made his senior debut on 28 October in a Copa Sudamericana second stage first leg draw at home to Peñarol; he replaced Pablo Galdames for the final moments. He went unused on the substitute's bench seven times across the next month or so, prior to making his bow domestically off the bench on 5 December in the Copa de la Liga Profesional versus Patronato. Monzón's first goal arrived on 16 January 2021 versus Rosario Central. In July 2021, Monzón joined Platense on a loan for the rest of the year. On 26 January 2022, Monzón was loaned out again, this time to Almirante Brown until the end of 2022.

On 7 August 2026, Monzón was transferred to the Mexican club Atlas.

== International career ==
In 2019, Monzón received a call-up from the U18s for the COTIF Tournament in Spain. He scored once, in a five-goal victory over Bahrain, as they placed third.

== Personal life ==
Monzón is the son of Pedro Monzón and nephew of Floreal García; both of whom were professional footballers.

== Career statistics ==
As of 17 January 2021.

Appearances and goals by club, season and competition
Club	Season	League			Cup		League Cup		Continental		Other		Total	
Club	Season	Division	Apps	Goals	Apps	Goals	Apps	Goals	Apps	Goals	Apps	Goals	Apps	Goals
Vélez Sarsfield	2020–21 (Note: Soccerway counts Copa de la Liga Profesional appearances as league appearances.)	Primera División	3	1	0	0	0	0	2 (Note: Appearance(s) in the Copa Sudamericana)	0	0	0	5	1
Career total			3	1	0	0	0	0	2	0	0	0	5	1
