= Stadio Artemio Franchi =

Football stadium in Florence, Italy

Coordinates: 43°46′51″N 11°16′56″E

- Stadio Comunale
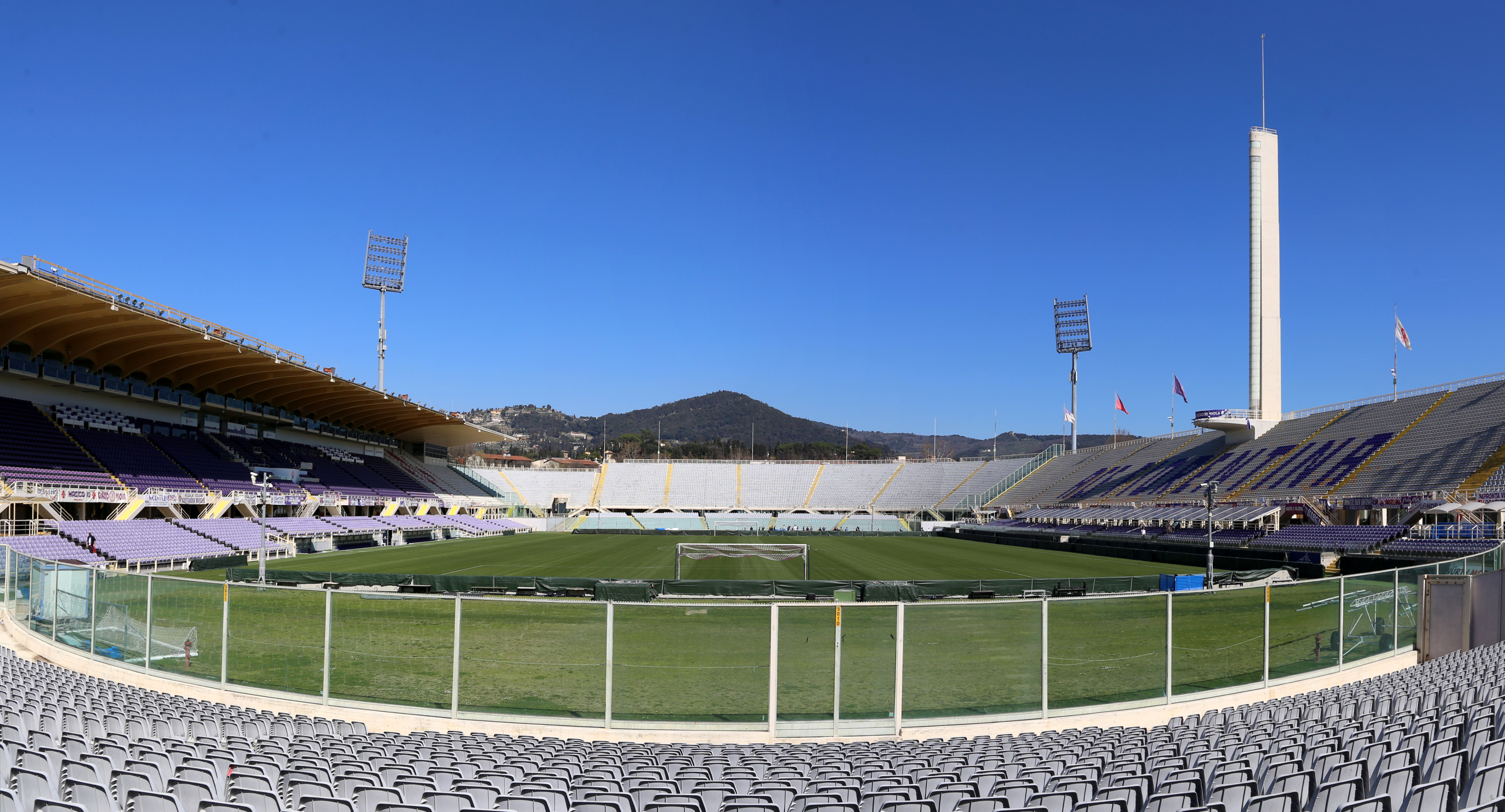
- Interactive map of Stadio Artemio Franchi
- Former names: Stadio Comunale
- Location: Florence, Italy
- Owner: Municipality of Florence
- Capacity: 24,786
- Surface: Grass
- Record attendance: 58,271 (Fiorentina–Internazionale, 25 November 1984)

Construction
- Opened: 13 September 1931
- Renovated: 1990, 2013, 2024
- Architect: Pier Luigi Nervi

Tenants
- Fiorentina (1931–present); Italy national football team (selected matches)

The Stadio Artemio Franchi is a football stadium in Florence, Italy. It is currently the home of Fiorentina. The old nickname of the stadium was "Comunale". When it was first constructed, it was known as the Stadio Giovanni Berta, after Florentine fascist Giovanni Berta.

The stadium was officially opened on 13 September 1931 with a match between Fiorentina and Admira Wien (1–0), though it took until 1932 for the stadium to be completely finished and currently holds 47,282. The architect is Pier Luigi Nervi (known for the Nervi Hall in the Vatican) and it is one of the most relevant examples of 20th-century architecture in the city. It hosted some of the matches of the 1934 World Cup, as well as football preliminaries for the 1960 Summer Olympics in Rome. In 1945, it hosted the Spaghetti Bowl between American service teams.

The stadium is built entirely of reinforced concrete with a 70 metre (230 ft) tower that bears the stadium's flagstaff. The tower is called the "Tower of Marathon". Around the base of the tower, spiral ramps lead from the ground floor to the upper edge of the grandstand. It was originally called the "Comunale" but was renamed after the former FIGC president, Artemio Franchi (1922–1983), in 1991. The stadium underwent renovations for the 1990 FIFA World Cup which included removing the running track and increasing the seating capacity. At the World Cup, the ground hosted three matches in Group A and Argentina's penalty shootout win over Yugoslavia in the quarter-finals.

The official record attendance is 58,271 on 25 November 1984, at a Serie A match between Fiorentina and Internazionale.

== Concerts ==
David Bowie performed at the stadium during his Glass Spider Tour on 9 June 1987. Madonna performed, with Level 42 as her opening act, the final show of her Who's That Girl World Tour at the stadium on 6 September 1987. This performance was filmed and later released on VHS and DVD, titled Ciao, Italia! – Live from Italy. She performed at the stadium again 25 years later on 16 June 2012 to a sold-out crowd of 42,434 people during her MDNA Tour. Bruce Springsteen performed on 8 June 2003 at the stadium during his The Rising Tour and on 10 June 2012 for the Wrecking Ball World Tour, in front of 42,658 people. It rained throughout the 2012 concert.

== National football team ==
The Italy national football team has played at the stadium, the first occasion being on 7 May 1933 in a 2–0 win over Czechoslovakia. The national team played only one game there between 1982 and 2006; a 2–0 friendly win against Mexico on 20 January 1993. On 1 March 2006, they played a friendly against Germany and won 4–1. The stadium hosted two matches in Euro 2012 qualifying: a 5–0 win over the Faroe Islands, and a 1–0 win over Slovenia on 6 September 2011 which was its most recent international hosting. During the match with Faroe Islands on 7 September 2010, Fabio Quagliarella (a member of Juventus at the time) scored a goal. Because Fiorentina fans have such a strong rivalry with Juventus, the fans at the stadium booed Quagliarella.

== National rugby team ==
The stadium has also hosted international rugby union matches. Italy played Australia on 20 November 2010, losing by a score of 14–32. Italy beat South Africa at the stadium on 19 November 2016, defeating the Springboks for the first time in their history. The final score was 20–18.

== 1954 UFO sightings ==
On 27 October 1954, a reserve game between Fiorentina and nearby rivals Pistoiese was under way at the Stadio Artemio Franchi when a group of UFOs traveling at high speed abruptly stopped over the stadium. The stadium became silent as the crowd of around 10,000 spectators witnessed the event and described the UFOs as cigar shaped. The sighting went on for several minutes, before "silvery glitter" fell down and covered the entire stadium. The substance was also seen falling elsewhere the same day, whereafter "shiny balls" had been observed.

It was suggested that the most likely explanation was that the silk of mass migrating spiders had agglomerated high in the atmosphere. However, this suggestion was contradicted by the chemical analysis of the substance that was undertaken at the Institute of Chemical Analysis at University of Florence, which found it to contain boron, silicon, calcium and magnesium, which according to science writer Philip Ball, did not seem to match with the spider theory:

Magnesium and calcium are fairly common elements in living bodies, boron and silicon much less so - but if these were the main elements that the white fluff contained, it doesn't sound to me as though they'd come from spiders.

== 1934 FIFA World Cup ==
The stadium was one of the venues of the 1934 FIFA World Cup, and held the following matches:

Date	Team #1	Res.	Team #2	Round	Attendance	Referee
27 May 1934	Germany	5–2	Belgium	First Round	8,000	Francesco Mattea (Italy)
31 May 1934	Italy	1–1	Spain	Quarter Finals	35,000	Louis Baert (Belgium)
1 June 1934	Italy	1–0	Spain	Quarter Finals (Replay)	43,000	René Mercet (Switzerland)

== 1990 FIFA World Cup ==
The stadium was one of the venues of the 1990 FIFA World Cup, and held the following matches:

Date	Team #1	Res.	Team #2	Round
10 June 1990	United States	1–5	Czechoslovakia	Group A
15 June 1990	Austria	0–1	Czechoslovakia	Group A
19 June 1990	Austria	2–1	United States	Group A
30 June 1990	Argentina	0–0 (3–2 on penalties)	Yugoslavia	Quarter-finals
