= Andreas Lipa =

Austrian footballer

Personal information
- Full name: Andreas Lipa
- Date of birth: 26 April 1971 (age 55)
- Place of birth: Vienna, Austria
- Height: 6 ft 1 in (1.85 m)
- Positions: Defender; midfielder

Senior career*
Years	Team	Apps	(Gls)
1990–1992	First Vienna	35	(5)
1992–1993	Austria Salzburg	3	(1)
1993–1994	LASK	9	(0)
1994–1997	Austria Lustenau	93	(4)
1997–2002	Grazer AK	106	(10)
2002–2003	Skoda Xanthi	14	(0)
2003–2004	Port Vale	32	(2)
2004–2006	Austria Lustenau	42	(0)
2006–2008	Wiener Sport-Club	57	(6)
2008–2009	SV Wienerberg	34	(1)
Total		425	(29)

International career
2000	Austria	1	(0)

Managerial career
- 2014–2015: First Vienna FC II
- 2015–2016: First Vienna FC
- 2017: 1. FC Bisamberg
- 2017: SC Austria Lustenau
- 2017–2018: SV Stripfing
- 2025–: SV Horn
- * Club domestic league appearances and goals

Andreas Lipa (born 26 April 1971) is an Austrian football coach and former footballer who is manager of SV Horn.

During a 19-year career, Lipa played as a defender and midfielder in Austria, Greece and England, playing for First Vienna, LASK, Austria Salzburg, Austria Lustenau, Grazer AK, Skoda Xanthi, Port Vale, Wiener Sport-Club, and SV Wienerberg.

He also played at international level, earning one cap for the Austria national team in 2000.

He later managed First Vienna FC, 1. FC Bisamberg, SC Austria Lustenau, SV Stripfing, and SV Horn.

== Club career ==
Born in Vienna, Lipa spent his early career in his native Austria with First Vienna, LASK, Austria Salzburg, Austria Lustenau and Grazer AK.

Lipa left Austrian football, and after a trial with English club Portsmouth in January 2002, he joined up with Greek side Skoda Xanthi. Coach Nikos Karageorgiou led the Alpha Ethniki club to a 9th-place finish in 2002–03. In June 2003 he returned to England to sign with Port Vale of the Second Division. During a 5–1 defeat to Plymouth Argyle at Vale Park on 18 October 2003, Lipa made a racist comment to Plymouth player Jason Bent. Lipa wrote a letter of apology to Bent and said "he wished he could turn the clock back" but was docked a week's wages. Bent accepted the apology as Lipa claimed to have spoke "in the heat of the moment" and the club also issued a statement of apology, stating Lipa "is in no way racist". Despite this he was still charged by the Football Association. He scored twice in 33 games in 2003–04, finding himself sidelined from the first-team after manager Brian Horton was replaced by Martin Foyle. He featured in two League One games for the "Valiants" in 2004–05, and after a spell plagued with injuries he was released in November 2004, returning to his native lands to re-sign with Austria Lustenau. He signed for Wiener Sport-Club in 2006, and the 37-year-old moved to SV Wienerberg in the summer of 2008. Despite being contracted to the club until 2010, he retired in June 2009.

== International career ==
Lipa made one substitute appearance for the Austria national side in April 2000 in a 2–1 defeat to Croatia, replacing Günther Neukirchner on 67 minutes. He was handed his debut by Otto Barić, his former manager at Austria Salzburg.

== Management career ==
Lipa coached the youth team at Austrian Regionalliga Regionalliga Ost side First Vienna FC, before being elevated to first-team manager in April 2015. He led the club to a second-place finish behind SV Horn in the 2015–16 season, before he was replaced by SV Horn coach Hans Kleer.

In April 2017, he became the head coach of SC Austria Lustenau, before being dismissed in September that year. A few months later, he took charge of SV Stripfing.

In June 2025, Lipa was appointed as head coach of SV Horn.

== Personal life ==
Lipa's English wife, Sarah Adams-Lipa, publicly spoke out against the WAGs culture in British football. She also appeared on the British TV programme Come Dine with Me, appearing on the fourth week of programmes of the first series in 2005 and winning the £1,000 first prize. In 2009, it was revealed that the couple had been defrauded by Texan swindler Allen Stanford.

== Career statistics ==
Appearances and goals by club, season and competition
Club	Season	League			National cup (Note: Includes Austrian Cup, FA Cup, Greek Cup)		Other		Total	
Club	Season	Division	Apps	Goals	Apps	Goals	Apps	Goals	Apps	Goals
First Vienna	1989–90	Austrian Bundesliga	3	0	0	0	0	0	3	0
First Vienna	1990–91	Austrian Bundesliga	12	1						
First Vienna	1991–92	Austrian Bundesliga	20	4						
First Vienna	Total		35	5						
Austria Salzburg	1992–93	Austrian Bundesliga	3	1						
LASK	1993–94	Austrian First League	9	0						
Austria Lustenau	1994–95	Austrian First League	18	0						
Austria Lustenau	1995–96	Austrian First League	25	1						
Austria Lustenau	1996–97	Austrian First League	30	1						
Austria Lustenau	1997–98	Austrian Bundesliga	20	2						
Austria Lustenau	Total		93	4						
Grazer AK	1997–98	Austrian Bundesliga	15	3						
Grazer AK	1998–99	Austrian Bundesliga	29	5						
Grazer AK	1999–2000	Austrian Bundesliga	29	2						
Grazer AK	2000–01	Austrian Bundesliga	23	0						
Grazer AK	2001–02	Austrian Bundesliga	10	0						
Grazer AK	Total		106	10						
Skoda Xanthi	2002–03	Alpha Ethniki	14	0						
Port Vale	2003–04	Second Division	30	2	2	0	1 (Note: Appearance(s) in the EFL Trophy.)	0	33	2
Port Vale	2004–05	League One	2	0	0	0	0	0	2	0
Port Vale	Total		32	2	2	0	1	0	35	2
Austria Lustenau	2004–05	Austrian First League	10	0						
Austria Lustenau	2005–06	Austrian First League	32	0						
Austria Lustenau	Total		42	0						
Wiener Sport-Club	2006–07	Austrian Regionalliga	29	3						
Wiener Sport-Club	2007–08	Austrian Regional League	28	3						
Wiener Sport-Club	Total		57	6						
SV Wienerberg	2008–09	Austrian Regional League	24	0						
SV Wienerberg	2009–10	Austrian Regional League	10	1						
SV Wienerberg	Total		34	1						
Total			425	29	2	0	1	0	428	29
