= Pedro Monzón =

Argentine footballer and coach

Personal information
- Full name: Pedro Damián Monzón
- Date of birth: 23 February 1962 (age 64)
- Place of birth: Goya, Argentina
- Height: 1.83 m (6 ft 0 in)
- Position: Defender

Team information
- Current team: Independiente (assistant manager)

Senior career*
Years	Team	Apps	(Gls)
1980–1981	Unión Santa Fe	7	(0)
1981–1991	Independiente	199	(8)
1992	Barcelona SC	10	(1)
1992–1993	Huracán	23	(0)
1993–1994	Quilmes	41	(1)
1995	Alianza Lima	?	(?)
1995–1996	Atlético Tucumán	16	(0)
1996	Santiago Wanderers	?	(?)
Total		296	(10)

International career
1988–1990	Argentina	15	(1)

Managerial career
- 2003: Potros
- 2004: Independiente (interim)
- 2005: Olmedo
- 2006: Coatzacoalcos
- 2006–2007: Veracruz
- 2008: Chacarita Juniors
- 2010: Juventud Antoniana
- 2011–2012: San Martín de Tucumán
- 2012–2013: Tiro Federal
- 2013: Platense
- 2014: Flandria
- 2015–2016: Tristán Suárez
- 2016: Güemes
- 2017–2021: Argentino de Quilmes
- 2021: Independiente (assistant)
- 2022: Colón (assistant)
- 2022: Dock Sud
- 2022–: Independiente (assistant)
- 2023: Independiente (interim)
- * Club domestic league appearances and goals

Pedro Damián Monzón (born 23 February 1962) is an Argentine football manager and former player who played as a defender. He is an assistant manager of Independiente.

== Club career ==
Moncho Monzón played in different clubs, but most importantly in Independiente, with which he obtained 4 titles, including the Intercontinental Cup in 1984.

== International career ==
With the Argentina national team, Monzón obtained 15 caps between 1988 and 1990. He scored his only international goal in a 1–1 draw against Romania in the team's final group match of 1990 World Cup; the result saw Argentina advance as one of the best third-place teams.

During the same tournament, Monzón became the first player to be sent off in a World Cup final, when referee Edgardo Codesal gave him a straight red card for a high tackle on Jürgen Klinsmann of Germany 65 minutes into the game, 20 minutes after he replaced fellow defender Oscar Ruggeri. Monzón would be joined by teammate Gustavo Dezotti later on as Argentina lost the game 1–0 and finished with nine men on the field. Some accused Klinsmann of diving; at an interview in 2004, Klinsmann noted that Monzón's foul left a 15-cm gash on his shin.

== Managerial career ==
After retirement, Monzón became a coach and manager. He has coached different clubs in Mexico and Ecuador, as well as youth divisions of clubs in Mexico and Argentina. He had a short spell as interim manager of Independiente,.

In Ecuador, he was suspended for 2 months while coaching club Olmedo for aggression towards a referee.

He then became youth team manager at CD Veracruz before taking over as first team manager in the Primera División de México, he was replaced in 2007.

In 2008, he returned to Argentina to take over as manager of Chacarita Juniors.

== Personal life ==
Monzón's son, Florián, is a professional footballer.

== Career statistics ==
=== International goals ===
Scores and results list Argentina's goal tally first.

No	Date	Venue	Opponent	Score	Result	Competition
1.	18 June 1990	Stadio San Paolo, Naples, Italy	Romania	1–0	1–1	1990 FIFA World Cup

== Honours ==
=== Player ===
Independiente

- Primera División Argentina: Metropolitano 1983, 1988–89
- Copa Libertadores: 1984
- Copa Intercontinental: 1984
- Supercopa Libertadores runner-up: 1989

Argentina

- FIFA World Cup runner-up: 1990
