= Günther Vidreis =

Austrian footballer

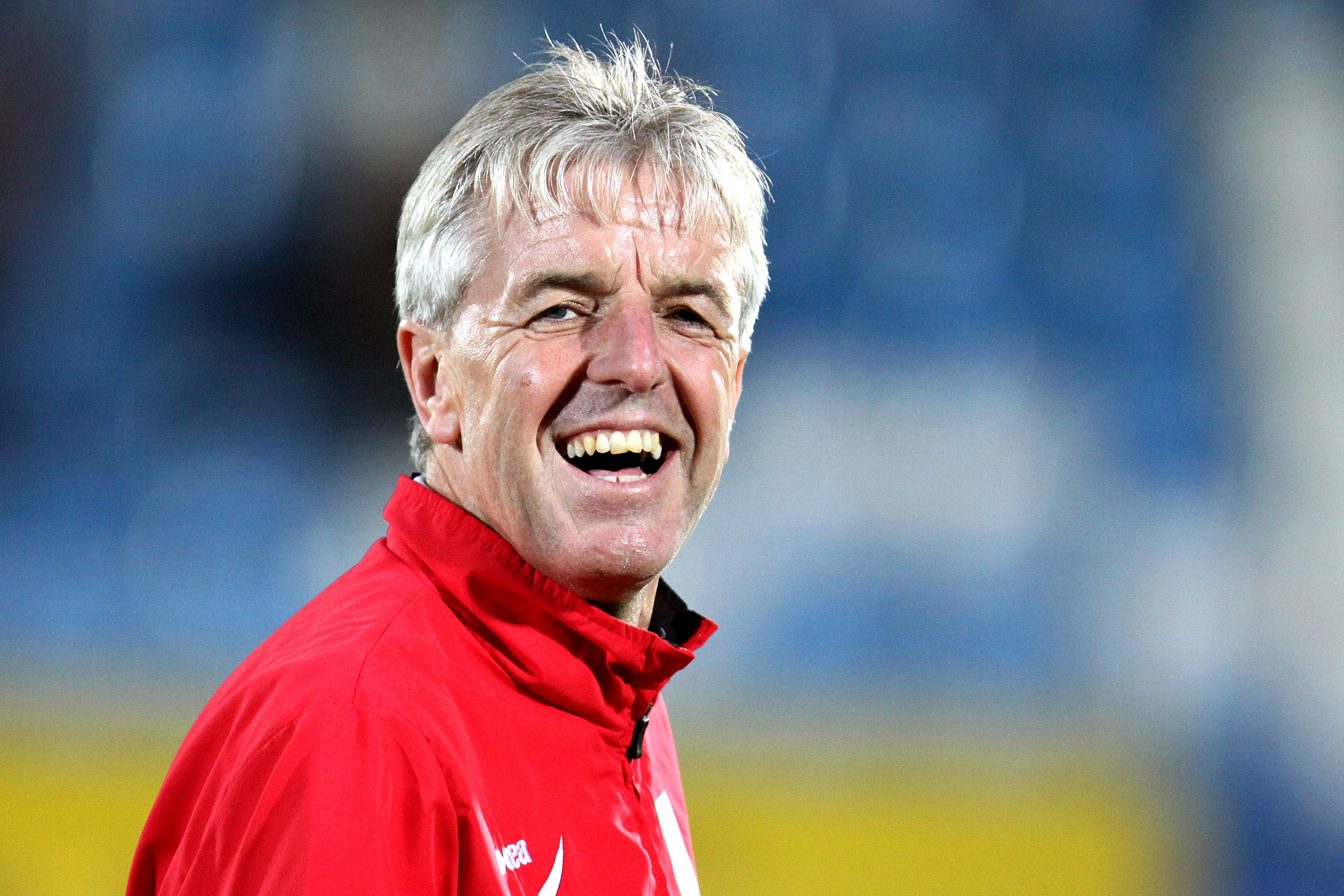
- Vidreis in 2015

Personal information
- Date of birth: 16 September 1961 (age 65)
- Height: 1.87 m (6 ft 2 in)
- Position: Forward

Senior career*
Years	Team	Apps	(Gls)
1983–1984	SV Sankt Veit		
1984–1990	SK VOEST Linz		
1985–1986	SK Sturm Graz		
1987	Donawitzer SV Alpine		
1987–1988	VfB Union Mödling		
1988–1993	First Vienna FC		
1993–1995	SK Treibach		
1996	Villacher SV		
1996–1997	SV Sankt Veit		

Managerial career
- 2005–2011: AKA Kärnten (youth)
- 2011–2012: SK Austria Klagenfurt (youth)
- 2012–2013: FC Mölltal
- 2013–2014: TSV Neumarkt
- 2014: Friesacher AC
- 2014–2016: SK Austria Klagenfurt (assistant)
- * Club domestic league appearances and goals

Günther Vidreis (born 16 September 1961) is a retired Austrian football striker and later manager.
