= Anton Pfeffer =

Austrian former professional footballer (born 1965)

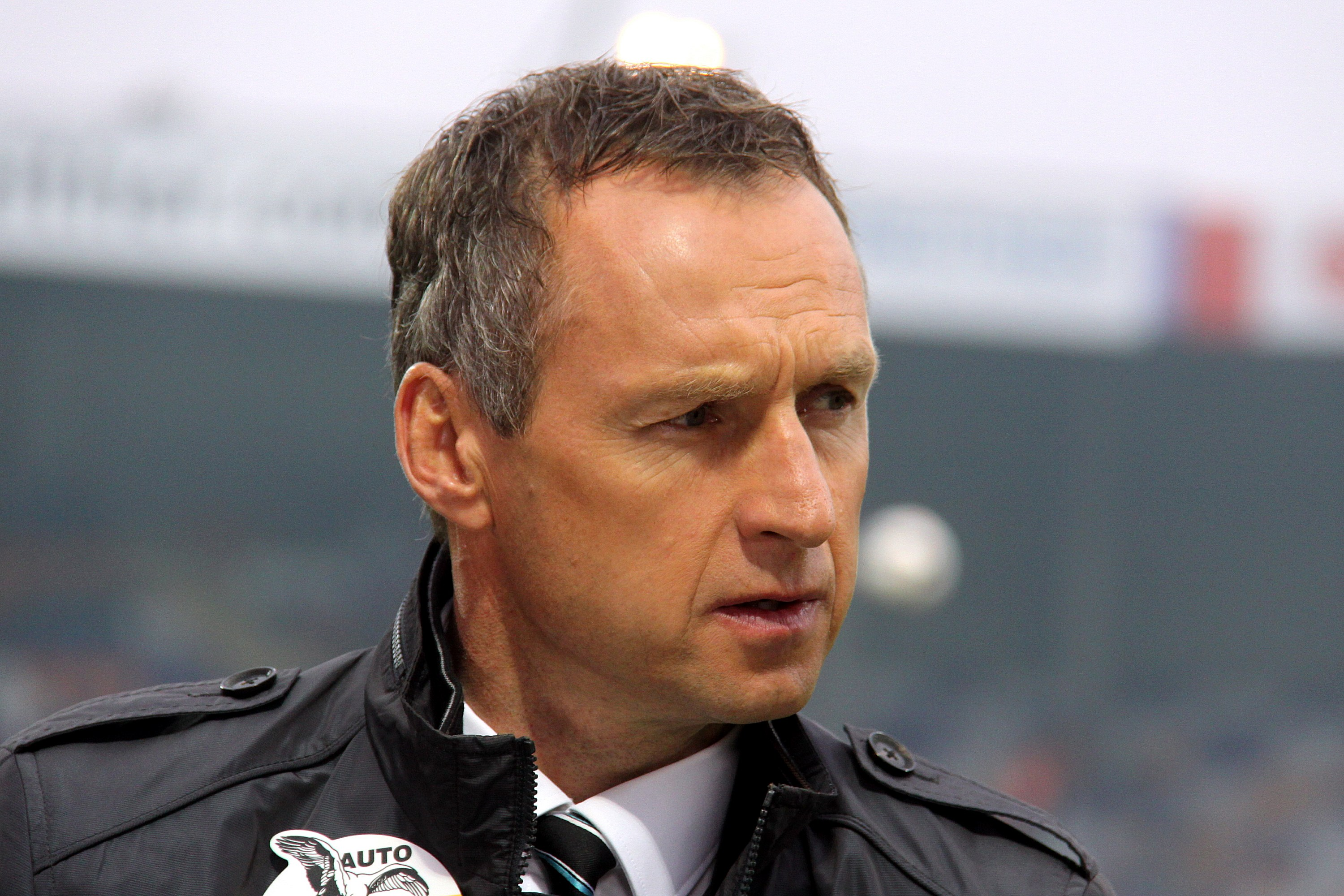

Personal information
- Date of birth: 17 August 1965 (age 61)
- Place of birth: Lilienfeld, Austria
- Height: 1.86 m (6 ft 1 in)
- Position: Defender

Youth career
- 1975–1985: SV Tuernitz

Senior career*
| Years | Team | Apps | (Gls) |
| 1985–2000 | Austria Wien | 396 | (19) |

International career
| 1988–1999 | Austria | 63 | (1) |

Managerial career
- 2001: Austria Wien
- * Club domestic league appearances and goals

Anton "Toni" Pfeffer (born 17 August 1965) is an Austrian former professional footballer who played as a defender.

After ending his football career in 2000, Pfeffer ran unsuccessfully in local elections for the Austrian People's Party. In 2005, he joined the board of SKN St. Pölten and advises the executive committee on sporting issues.

Pfeffer has also developed a folk singing career with the release of two collections of Austrian folk songs. He currently works as one of Sky Austria's main football pundits.

== Club career ==
Born in Lilienfeld, Lower Austria, Pfeffer joined Austria Wien at 19 years of age and made his professional debut for them in 1987. He stayed loyal to Austria during his entire playing career winning four league titles and four domestic cups. He also captained the team.

== International career ==
Pfeffer made his debut for Austria in an April 1988 friendly match against Greece and was a participant at the 1990 and 1998 FIFA World Cup. He earned 63 caps, scoring one goal. His last international was the embarrassing 0-9 demolition by Spain in a European Championship qualification match in March 1999.

== Career statistics ==
Scores and results list Austria's goal tally first, score column indicates score after each Pfeffer goal.

List of international goals scored by Anton Pfeffer
| No. | Date | Venue | Opponent | Score | Result | Competition |
|---|---|---|---|---|---|---|
| 1 | 30 May 1990 | Praterstadion, Vienna, Austria | Netherlands | 3–0 | 3–2 | Friendly |

== Honours ==
Austria Wien

- Austrian Bundesliga: 1986, 1991, 1992, 1993
- Austrian Cup: 1986, 1990, 1992, 1994
