= Ernst Aigner =

Austrian footballer

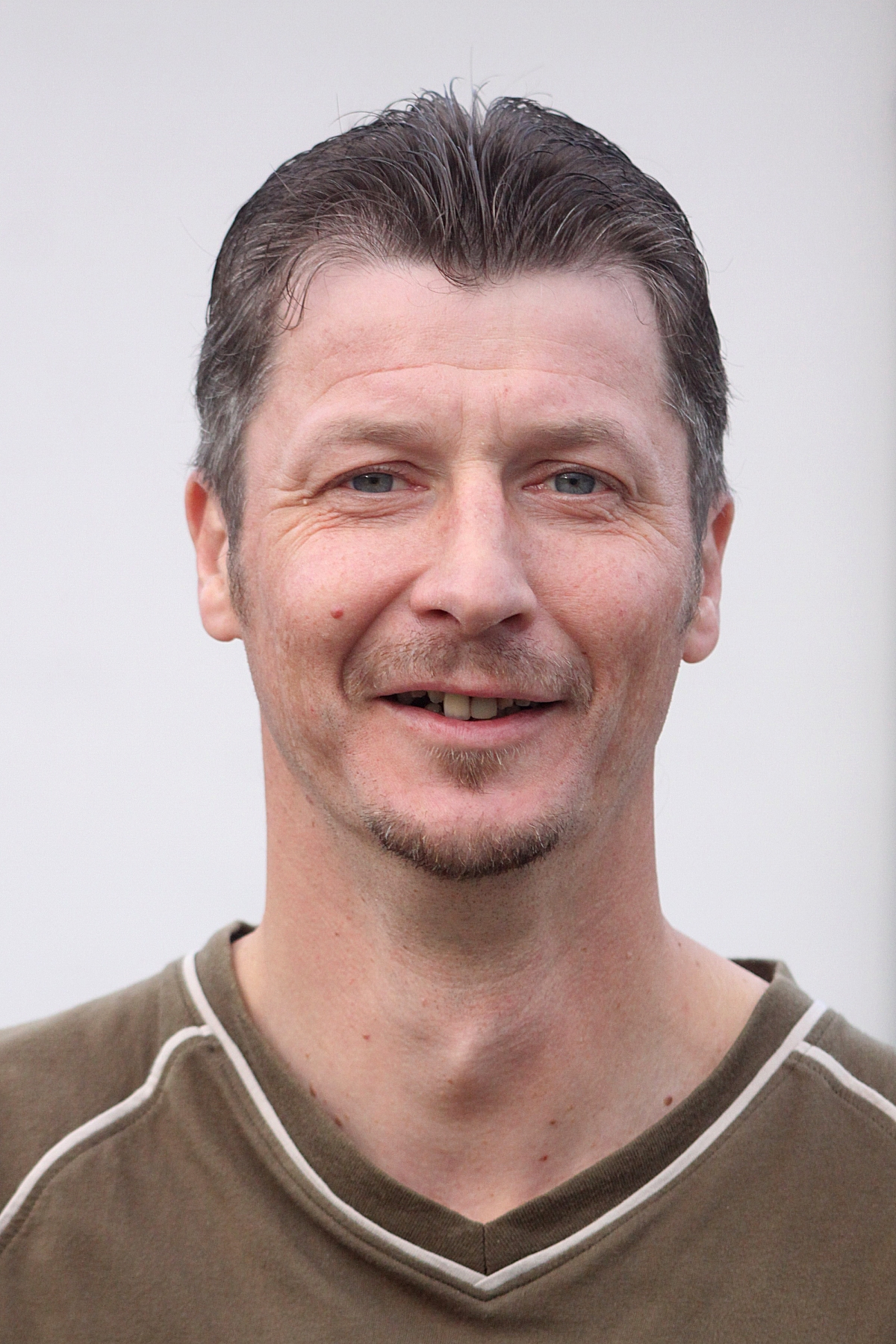

Personal information
- Full name: Ernst Aigner
- Date of birth: 31 October 1966 (age 60)
- Place of birth: Mödling, Austria
- Height: 1.96 m (6 ft 5 in)
- Position: Defender

Youth career
- 1. SVg. Guntramsdorf

Senior career*
Years	Team	Apps	(Gls)
1986–1989	Admira/Wacker	74	(12)
1989–1994	Austria Wien	100	(6)
1994–1996	VSE St. Pölten	53	(10)
1996–2001	VfB Admira Wacker Mödling	86	(15)
2001–2003	ASK Kottingbrunn	62	(2)
2003–2011	1. SC Sollenau	44	(4)
Total		419	(49)

International career
1989–1990	Austria	11	(0)
- * Club domestic league appearances and goals

Ernst Aigner (born 31 October 1966 in Mödling) is a retired Austrian footballer.

== Club career ==
A tall central defender, Aigner made his debut in the Austrian Bundesliga for Admira/Wacker in 1986 and finished runner-up to Swarovski Tirol with Admira in the 1988–89 season. Admira would also reach the Austrian Cup Final that season. His best season with Admira earned him a move to Austrian giants Austria Wien with whom he won 3 championships and 3 cups. In 1994, he signed for second division side VSE St. Pölten before returning to Admira in 1996. In 2001, he moved to ASK Kottingbrunn before retiring with amateur side 1. SC Sollenau.

== International career ==
He played for the Austria national football team, making his debut in a victorious international friendly against Norway on 31 May 1989, 4-1. He was a participant at the 1990 World Cup. After the 1990 World Cup, Aigner played only one more international, which was against Yugoslavia on 31 October 1990.

== Honours ==
Admira/Wacker

- Austrian Cup
  - Runner-up (1): 1989

Austria Wien

- Austrian Football Bundesliga
  - Runner-up (3): 1989-90, 1990-91, 1991-92, 1993-94
- Austrian Cup
  - Winner (3): 1990, 1992, 1994
