= Ernst Mader =

Austrian footballer

Personal information
- Date of birth: 4 January 1968 (age 58)
- Place of birth: Vienna, Austria
- Height: 1.72 m (5 ft 8 in)
- Position: Midfielder

Senior career*
Years	Team	Apps	(Gls)
1984–1985	SC Wibeba-Ostbahn		
1985–1988	Austria Wien		
1988–1992	First Vienna		
1992–1995	VfB Mödling		
1995–1998	SV Gerasdorf		
1998–2002	Floridsdorfer AC		
2002–2003	Kremser SC		
2003–2004	Austria Wien II		
2004–2006	Rennweger SV 1901		
- * Club domestic league appearances and goals

Ernst Mader (born 4 January 1968) is a retired Austrian football midfielder.
