= Christian Salaba =

Austrian footballer

Personal information
- Date of birth: 6 April 1971
- Date of death: 19 November 2016 (aged 45)
- Position: Defender

Senior career*
| Years | Team | Apps | (Gls) |
| –1991 | Vienna | 61 | (2) |
| 1991–1992 | Rapid Wien | 9 | (0) |
| 1992–1993 | SK Vorwärts Steyr | 24 | (0) |
| 1993–1994 | SV Stockerau | | |
| 1994–1995 | Vienna | 2 | (0) |
| 1995–1996 | VSE St. Pölten | 26 | (7) |
| 1996–1997 | Admira/Wacker | 11 | (0) |
| 1997–1999 | SV Würmla | | |
| 1999–2001 | SV Mattersburg | 52 | (7) |
| 2002–2004 | SV Schwechat | 54 | (4) |
| 2004–2005 | Vienna | 28 | (2) |
- * Club domestic league appearances and goals

Christian Salaba (6 April 1971 – 19 November 2016) was an Austrian footballer.
