= Edgardo Codesal =

Mexican football referee

Edgardo Codesal Méndez (Spanish pronunciation: [eðˈɣaɾðo koˈðesal]; born 2 June 1951 in Montevideo, Uruguay) is a Uruguayan-born Mexican football referee, who refereed the 1990 World Cup final between West Germany and Argentina, held in Italy.

== Career ==
His grandfather was from Argentina, and his father, José Maria Codesal, was a referee in the 1966 FIFA World Cup. As a child he remembered his father refereeing. Edgardo was passionate about football, played in childhood Baby Football teams in the area and in his teens he played as goalkeeper for the Club Atlético Cerro of Montevideo.

He began his career as a referee in Uruguay in 1976. By 1977 he had his debut match in the Primera División Uruguaya refereeing Cerro vs Huracán.

In 1980, he traveled to Mexico where he had contact with the Mexican Football Federation. He advanced in his refereeing, starting to referee international matches and finals in Mexico.

Codesal represented Mexico, as a CONCACAF referee in the 1990 World Cup. Among his international posts, Codesal was CONCACAF's director of referees, head of refereeing for the FIFA Women's World Cup USA 1999, and member of the refereeing committee for the FIFA World U-20 Championship in Nigeria, the Confederations Cup in Mexico and the FIFA World U-17 Championship in New Zealand.

In 2016 he was attacked during a match as a spectator while serving as head of the FMF referees’ commission. The culprit - Veracruz owner Fidel Kuri was banned for attending matches for 12 months and was fined 146,080 Mexican pesos.

=== 1990 World Cup ===
FIFA observers rated Codesal 8.5 for his refereeing performance at the 1990 World Cup in Italy. Codesal had refereed the Italy vs USA match in the first round (group A), won 1–0 by hosts Italy. He also refereed the quarter-final between England and Cameroon, awarding three penalties – one to Cameroon and two to England. England won 3–2 to move on to the semi-finals, although the Cameroon players, including Roger Milla, later protested England's controversial penalties, claiming that Gary Lineker had simulated fouls on both occasions, before converting his kicks, including the match-winning goal in injury time of the first half of extra-time. Nevertheless, Codesal was credited with keeping control of a potentially difficult match over a period of 120 minutes.

==== Final ====
Codesal was appointed for the World Cup Final, which featured Argentina and West Germany, a rematch of the previous final four years earlier. In the 83rd minute, Codesal awarded West Germany a controversial penalty kick for an alleged foul by Roberto Sensini against Rudi Völler. Andreas Brehme converted the penalty kick to score the only goal of the match, and give West Germany their third World Cup title.

Codesal became the first referee to send off a player in a final match of a FIFA World Cup, by showing the red card to Argentines Monzón and Dezotti. Monzón was given a direct red after a tackle on Jürgen Klinsmann. Dezotti was sent off near the end for a tussle with Jürgen Kohler. During the final, Codesal also booked Argentina captain Diego Maradona for dissent.

Codesal retired from refereeing at the top level shortly after the 1990 World Cup. Codesal's officiating of the 1990 World Cup final has often been criticised in the Argentine media. In 2020, Codesal revealed that he had been the victim of online abuse following his criticism of Maradona's behaviour during and following the 1990 World Cup final.

== Major matches refereed ==
Date	Match	Tournament	Venue	Result	Ref
8 July 1990	West Germany vs. Argentina	1990 FIFA World Cup final	Stadio Olimpico, Rome	1–0	

Sporting positions (Uruguay) / (Mexico) Edgardo Codesal Méndez
Preceded by 1986 FIFA World Cup Final (Brazil) Romualdo Arppi Filho	1990 FIFA World Cup Final Referee	Succeeded by 1994 FIFA World Cup Final (Hungary) Sándor Puhl
