= Thomas Niederstrasser =

Austrian footballer

Personal information
- Date of birth: 13 March 1965 (age 61)
- Height: 1.80 m (5 ft 11 in)
- Position: Defender

Senior career*
Years	Team	Apps	(Gls)
1984–1985	Rapid Wien II		
1986–1990	First Vienna		
- * Club domestic league appearances and goals

Thomas Niederstrasser (born 13 March 1965) is a retired Austrian football defender.
