= Ewald Jenisch =

Austrian footballer (born 1964)

Personal information
- Date of birth: 29 February 1964 (age 62)
- Height: 1.80 m (5 ft 11 in)
- Position: Defender

Senior career*
Years	Team	Apps	(Gls)
1983–1984	SV Stockerau		
1984–1990	First Vienna		
1991	Kremser SC		
1991–2002	SV Stockerau		
2001	→ 1. Simmeringer SC		
2001	→ Großriedenthal		

International career
- Austria U21

Managerial career
- 2002–2006: SV Stockerau
- 2006–2009: SC Retz
- 2009–2011: SV Stockerau
- 2011: ASV Nickelsdorf
- 2011: SV Würmla
- 2012–2013: USC Altenwörth
- 2013: Admira Wacker (youth)
- 2014–2015: Admira Wacker II (assistant)
- 2015–2016: First Vienna II
- 2016–2017: SC Laa/Thaya
- 2017–?: SK Eggenburg
- * Club domestic league appearances and goals

Ewald Jenisch (born 29 February 1964) is a retired Austrian football defender and later manager.
