= Jiří Ondra =

Czech footballer (born 1957)

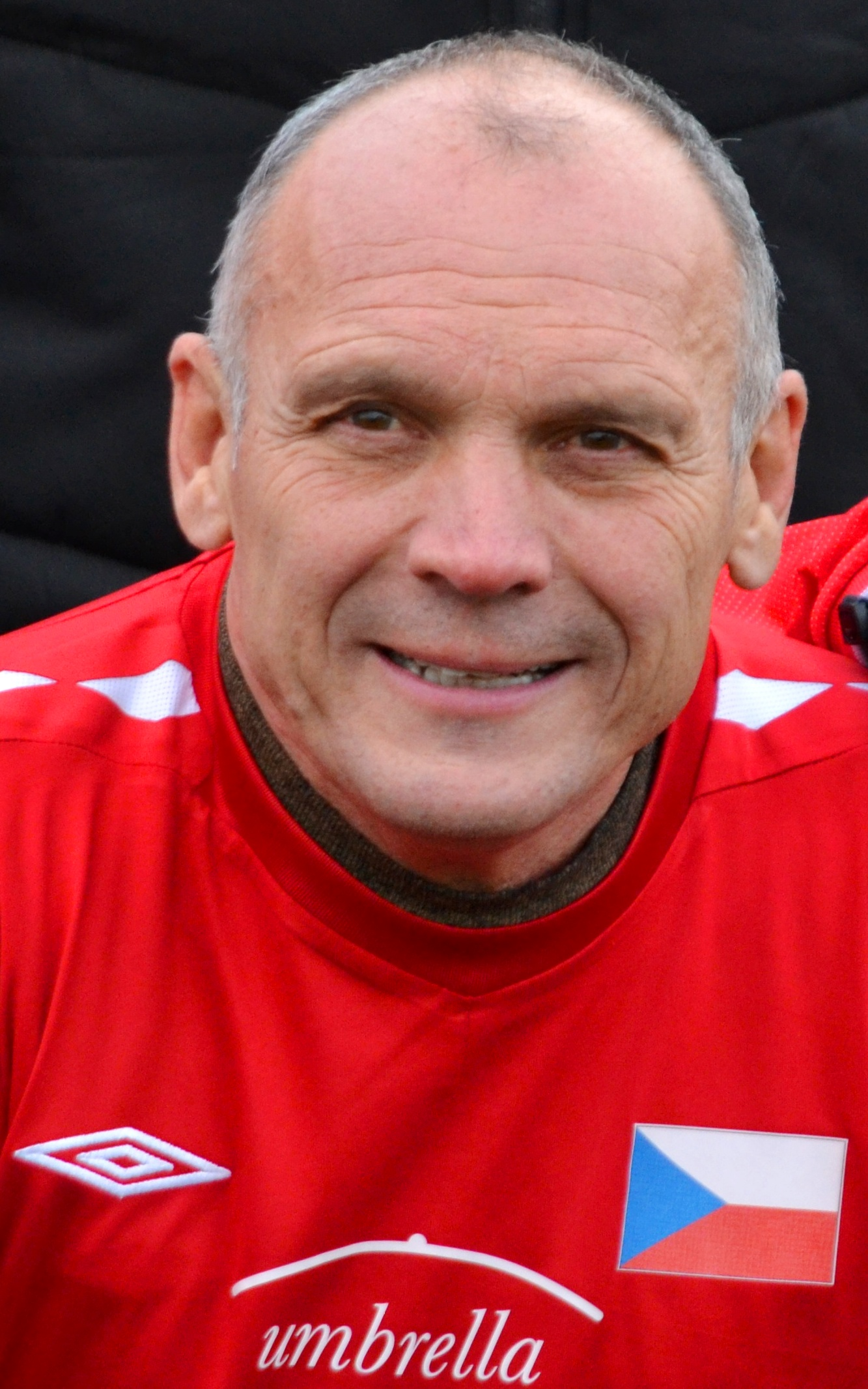
- Ondra in 2013

Personal information
- Date of birth: 7 June 1957 (age 69)
- Place of birth: Czechoslovakia
- Position: Defender

Senior career*
Years	Team	Apps	(Gls)
1978–1987	Bohemians 1905	173	(14)
1987–1991	First Vienna	117	(2)

International career
1982–1987	Czechoslovakia	20	(0)
- * Club domestic league appearances and goals

Jiří Ondra (born 7 June 1957) is a retired football defender.

During his club career, Ondra played for Bohemians 1905 and First Vienna in Austria. He also made 20 appearances for the Czechoslovakia national team.
