= Gerhard Steinkogler =

Austrian footballer

Personal information
- Date of birth: September 29, 1959 (age 67)
- Place of birth: Graz, Austria
- Position: Striker

Senior career*
Years	Team	Apps	(Gls)
1977–1979	Grazer AK	42	(10)
1979–1980	Werder Bremen	7	(1)
1980–1983	Austria Wien	76	(28)
1983	SSW Innsbruck	6	(0)
1983–1984	Grazer AK	22	(5)
1984–1986	Austria Wien	67	(23)
1986–1991	First Vienna	119	(33)
1991–1992	Wiener Sport-Club	10	(1)
Total		349	(101)

International career
1978–1989	Austria	5	(1)
- * Club domestic league appearances and goals

Gerhard Steinkogler (born September 29, 1959 in Graz, Austria) is an Austrian former professional footballer who played as a striker.

During his club career, Steinkogler played for Grazer AK, Austria Wien, Werder Bremen, SSW Innsbruck, First Vienna and Wiener Sport-Club. He also made five appearances for the Austria national team, scoring one goal.
