= Kurt Russ =

Austrian footballer

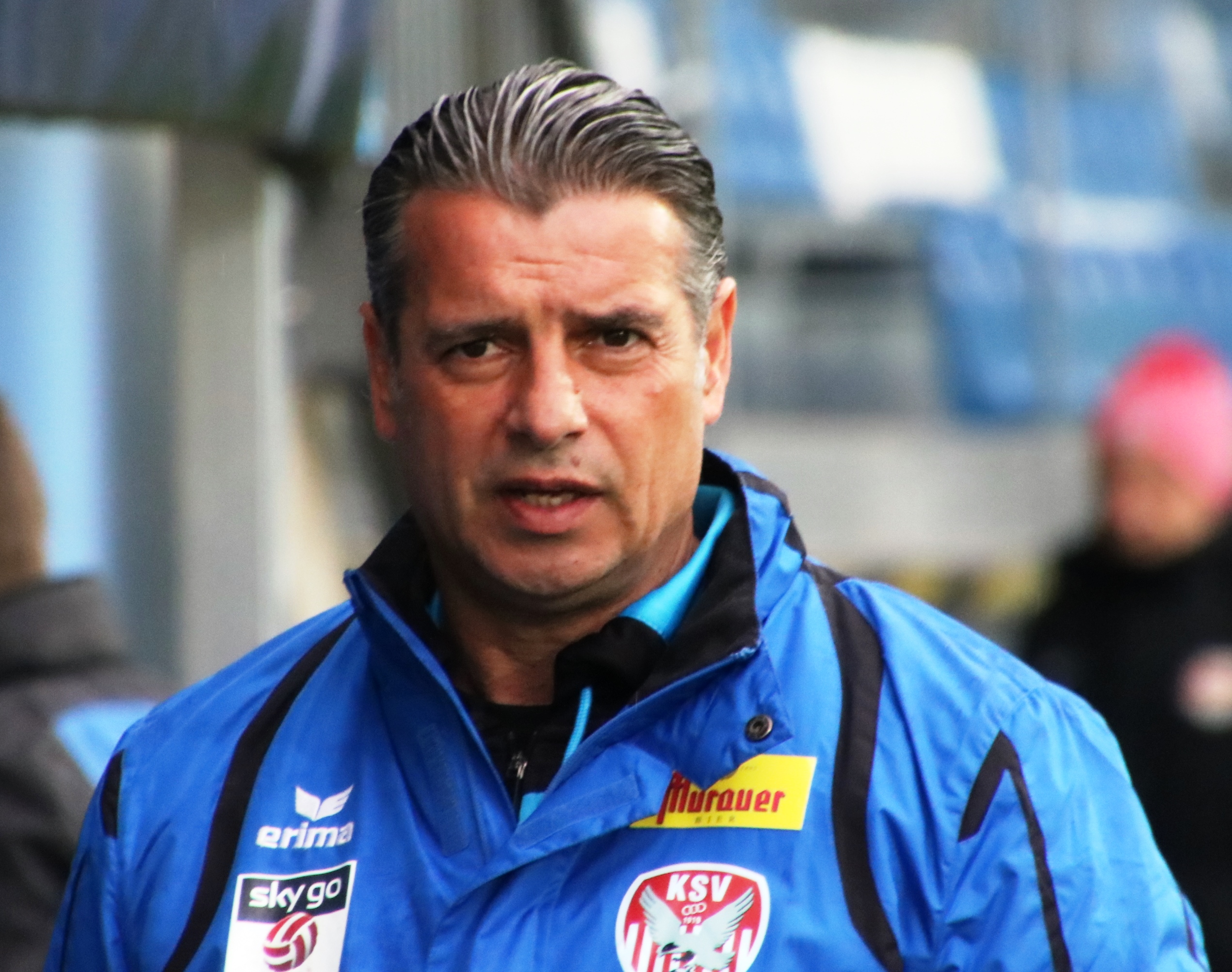
- Russ in 2016

Personal information
- Date of birth: 23 November 1964 (age 61)
- Place of birth: Langenwang, Austria
- Height: 1.80 m (5 ft 11 in)
- Position: Defender

Youth career
- FC Langenwang

Senior career*
Years	Team	Apps	(Gls)
- Kapfenberger SV
1987–1990	First Vienna	82	(12)
1990–1994	FC Swarovski Tirol	88	(1)
1994–1998	LASK Linz	92	(5)
Total		262	(18)

International career
1988–1991	Austria	28	(0)

Managerial career
- SC Schwanenstadt
- 2007–2008: Vorwärts Steyr
- 2010–2013: Kapfenberger SV II
- 2013–2016: Kapfenberger SV
- 2018–2020: Kapfenberger SV
- 2021–2022: TSV Hartberg
- * Club domestic league appearances and goals

Kurt Russ (born 23 November 1964) is an Austrian football coach and a former player.

== Club career ==
Russ began his playing career with his home town club of FC Langenwang and later moved on to Kapfenberger SV. During his professional club career he played for First Vienna, FC Swarovski Tirol and LASK Linz. He finished his career at SC Schwanenstadt to become player/coach.

== International career ==
Russ' international debut came in the 1–0 victory over Denmark on 27 April 1988. Under Josef Hickersberger's management of the Austrian national side, Russ was an almost permanent fixture appearing in the starting line ups of 27, out of a possible 31, internationals. The culmination of which was the 1990 FIFA World Cup. Hickersberger's departure issued in the era of Alfred Riedl as national coach, which saw a decline in Russ's use. His final international was a June 1991 European qualification match, like his debut game also against Denmark.

== Coaching career ==
More recently he has been the trainer with SC Schwanenstadt and from the summer of 2007 until March 2008 he was head coach of Vorwärts Steyr. He was the head coach of Kapfenberger SV from 2013 until 2016.
