= Gerald Glatzmayer =

Austrian footballer

Personal information
- Full name: Gerald Glatzmayer
- Date of birth: 14 December 1968
- Place of birth: Vienna, Austria
- Date of death: 11 January 2001 (aged 32)
- Place of death: Schwechat, Austria
- Height: 1.80 m (5 ft 11 in)
- Position: Midfielder

Senior career*
Years	Team	Apps	(Gls)
1985–1987	Austria Wien	24	(1)
1987–1990	First Vienna	89	(21)
1990–1994	Admira/Wacker	64	(6)
1993–1994	→ Favoritner AC (loan)		
1994–1995	VSE Skt Pölten		
1995–1998	SV Schwechat		
1998–1999	SC-ESV Parndorf 1919		

International career
1988–1990	Austria	6	(1)
- * Club domestic league appearances and goals

Gerald Glatzmayer (14 December 1968 – 11 January 2001) was an Austrian footballer who took part in the 1990 World Cup.

== Club career- ==
Born in Vienna, he mostly played professional football for local sides during his club career except for one season at Sankt Pölten. Making his debut at 17 years of age at Austria, he also played for First Vienna, Admira Wacker and SV Schwechat. He finished his career at SV Göllersdorf.

== International career ==
He made his debut for Austria in an August 1988 friendly match against Hungary and was a participant at the 1990 World Cup. He earned 6 caps, scoring 1 goal (against Malta in 1989). His last international was a June 1990 World Cup Finals match against the United States, Austria's final game at the tournament in which he came on as a late substitute for Gerhard Rodax.

=== International goal ===
Scores and results list Austria's goal tally first.

#	Date	Venue	Opponent	Score	Result	Competition
1.	4 October 1989	Ta' Qali National Stadium, Valletta	Malta	1–1	2–1	Friendly

== Death ==
Glatzmayer died in a car accident near Schwechat in January 2001.

== Honours ==
- Austrian Football Bundesliga (1):
  - 1986
- Austrian Cup (1):
  - 1986
