= 1986 FIFA World Cup knockout stage =

1986 Tournament knockout stage

The 1986 FIFA World Cup knockout stage was the second and final stage of the 1986 FIFA World Cup finals in Mexico. The stage began on 15 June 1986, and ended with the final at the Estadio Azteca in Mexico City on 29 June 1986.

Sixteen teams advanced to the knockout stage to compete in a single-elimination style tournament: The top two teams from each of the six groups, as well as the best four third-placed teams. In the round of 16, the four third-placed teams played against four of the group winners from group A-D, with the remaining two group winners from group E and F taking on two of the group runners-up; the remaining four runners-up were paired off against each other. The winners of the eight round of 16 matches were then paired together in the quarter-finals, the winners of which played against each other in the semi-finals.

The ties in each round were played over a single match; in the event that scores were level after 90 minutes, the teams would play an additional 30 minutes of extra time, divided into two 15-minute halves, to determine the winner. If the scores remained level after extra time, the teams would contest a penalty shoot-out.

A match for third place was also held on the day before the final, between the two losing teams of the semi-finals.

== Qualified teams ==
The top two placed teams from each of the six groups, plus the four best-placed third teams, qualified for the knockout stage.

Group	Winners	Runners-up	Third-placed teams (best four qualify)
A	Argentina	Italy	Bulgaria
B	Mexico	Paraguay	Belgium
C	Soviet Union	France	—N/a
D	Brazil	Spain	—N/a
E	Denmark	West Germany	Uruguay
F	Morocco	England	Poland

Based on group results, the matches would be the following in Round of 16:

Round of 16	Teams per qualified group positions	Teams identified
Match 1:	A1 – C3/D3/E3	Argentina – Uruguay
Match 2:	B2 – F2	Paraguay – England
Match 3:	E1 – D2	Denmark – Spain
Match 4:	C1 – A3/B3/F3	USSR – Belgium
Match 5:	D1 – B3/E3/F3	Brazil – Poland
Match 6:	A2 – C2	Italy – France
Match 7:	F1 – E2	Morocco – West Germany
Match 8:	B1 – A3/C3/D3	Mexico – Bulgaria

The pairings for matches 1, 4, 5, and 8 depend on who the best third places are that qualify for the round of 16. The following table published in Section 28 of the tournament regulations, shows the 15 different options to define the rivals of the winners of groups A, B, C and D.

Combination used according to the four qualified teams

Third teams qualify from groups:	Argentina (A1) plays vs.:	Mexico (B1) plays vs.:	USSR (C1) plays vs.:	Brazil (D1) plays vs.:
A B C D	C3	D3	A3	B3
A B C E	C3	A3	B3	E3
A B C F	C3	A3	B3	F3
A B D E	D3	A3	B3	E3
A B D F	D3	A3	B3	F3
A B E F	E3	A3	B3	F3
A C D E	C3	D3	A3	E3
A C D F	C3	D3	A3	F3
A C E F	C3	A3	F3	E3
A D E F	D3	A3	F3	E3
B C D E	C3	D3	B3	E3
B C D F	C3	D3	B3	F3
B C E F	E3	C3	B3	F3
B D E F	E3	D3	B3	F3
C D E F	C3	D3	F3	E3

== Bracket ==
Round of 16
16 June – Puebla
Argentina	1
Uruguay	0
18 June – Mexico City (Azteca)
England	3
Paraguay	0
18 June – Querétaro
Denmark	1
Spain	5
15 June – León
Soviet Union	3
Belgium (a.e.t.)	4
16 June – Guadalajara
Brazil	4
Poland	0
17 June – Mexico City (Olímpico)
Italy	0
France	2
17 June – San Nicolás de los Garza
Morocco	0
West Germany	1
15 June – Mexico City (Azteca)
Mexico	2
Bulgaria	0

Quarter-finals
22 June – Mexico City (Azteca)
Argentina	2
England	1
22 June – Puebla
Spain	1 (4)
Belgium (p)	1 (5)
21 June – Guadalajara
Brazil	1 (3)
France (p)	1 (4)
21 June – San Nicolás de los Garza
West Germany (p)	0 (4)
Mexico	0 (1)

Semi-finals
25 June – Mexico City (Azteca)
Argentina	2
Belgium	0
25 June – Guadalajara
France	0
West Germany	2

Final
29 June – Mexico City (Azteca)
Argentina	3
West Germany	2
Match for third place
28 June – Puebla
Belgium	2
France (a.e.t.)	4

== Round of 16 ==
=== Mexico vs Bulgaria ===
15 June 1986
12:00 CST

Mexico	2–0	Bulgaria
Negrete 34'; Servín 61'

Estadio Azteca, Mexico City
Attendance: 114,580
Referee: Romualdo Arppi Filho (Brazil)

Mexico	Bulgaria

GK	1	Pablo Larios
RB	18	Rafael Amador
CB	14	Félix Cruz
CB	3	Fernando Quirarte
LB	17	Raúl Servín
RM	7	Miguel España
DM	16	Carlos Muñoz
CM	10	Tomás Boy (c)	(substituted off) 79'
LM	13	Javier Aguirre
AM	22	Manuel Negrete
CF	9	Hugo Sánchez
Substitutions:
GK	20	Olaf Heredia
FW	5	Francisco Javier Cruz
MF	6	Carlos de los Cobos	(substituted on) 79'
MF	8	Alejandro Domínguez
FW	11	Carlos Hermosillo
Manager:
(Socialist Federal Republic of Yugoslavia) Bora Milutinović

GK	1	Borislav Mihaylov
RB	12	Radoslav Zdravkov
CB	3	Nikolay Arabov	(yellow card) 58'
CB	5	Georgi Dimitrov (c)
LB	4	Petar Petrov
RM	11	Plamen Getov		(substituted off) 59'
DM	15	Georgi Yordanov
CM	8	Ayan Sadakov
LM	19	Atanas Pashev		(substituted off) 70'
AM	10	Zhivko Gospodinov
CF	20	Kostadin Kostadinov
Substitutions:
GK	22	Iliya Valov
MF	2	Nasko Sirakov		(substituted on) 59'
FW	7	Bozhidar Iskrenov		(substituted on) 70'
MF	14	Plamen Markov
FW	16	Vasil Dragolov
Manager:
Ivan Vutsov

=== Soviet Union vs Belgium ===
15 June 1986
16:00 CST

Soviet Union	3–4 (a.e.t.)	Belgium
Belanov 27', 70', 111' (pen.)		Scifo 56'; Ceulemans 77'; Demol 102'; Claesen 110'

Estadio Nou Camp, León
Attendance: 32,277
Referee: Erik Fredriksson (Sweden)

Soviet Union	Belgium

GK	1	Rinat Dasayev
DF	2	Volodymyr Bezsonov
DF	5	Anatoliy Demyanenko (c)
DF	10	Oleh Kuznetsov
DF	21	Vasiliy Rats
MF	12	Andriy Bal
MF	7	Ivan Yaremchuk
MF	8	Pavel Yakovenko	(substituted off) 79'
MF	9	Aleksandr Zavarov	(substituted off) 72'
MF	20	Sergei Aleinikov
FW	19	Ihor Belanov
Substitutions:
GK	16	Viktor Chanov
DF	3	Aleksandr Chivadze
FW	11	Oleh Blokhin
FW	14	Sergey Rodionov	(substituted on) 72'
MF	17	Vadym Yevtushenko	(substituted on) 79'
Manager:
Valeri Lobanovsky

GK	1	Jean-Marie Pfaff
DF	2	Eric Gerets		(substituted off) 112'
DF	5	Michel Renquin	(yellow card) 65'
DF	13	Georges Grün		(substituted off) 99'
DF	22	Patrick Vervoort
MF	21	Stéphane Demol
MF	6	Franky Vercauteren
MF	8	Enzo Scifo
MF	11	Jan Ceulemans (c)
FW	18	Daniel Veyt
FW	16	Nico Claesen
Substitutions:
GK	12	Jacky Munaron
MF	3	Franky Van der Elst
DF	14	Lei Clijsters		(substituted on) 99'
DF	15	Leo Van der Elst		(substituted on) 112'
DF	19	Hugo Broos
Manager:
Guy Thys

=== Brazil vs Poland ===
16 June 1986
12:00 CST

Brazil	4–0	Poland
Sócrates 30' (pen.); Josimar 55'; Edinho 79'; Careca 83' (pen.)

Estadio Jalisco, Guadalajara
Attendance: 45,000
Referee: Volker Roth (West Germany)

Brazil	Poland

GK	1	Carlos
RB	13	Josimar
CB	14	Júlio César
CB	4	Edinho (c)	(yellow card) 83'
LB	17	Branco
DM	19	Elzo
CM	15	Alemão
CM	6	Júnior
AM	18	Sócrates		(substituted off) 69'
SS	7	Müller		(substituted off) 73'
CF	9	Careca	(yellow card) 36'
Substitutions:
GK	12	Paulo Vítor
CB	3	Oscar
CF	8	Casagrande
AM	10	Zico		(substituted on) 69'
AM	20	Silas		(substituted on) 73'
Manager:
Telê Santana

GK	1	Józef Młynarczyk
SW	5	Roman Wójcicki
RB	2	Kazimierz Przybyś		(substituted off) 59'
CB	10	Stefan Majewski
LB	4	Marek Ostrowski
DM	9	Jan Karaś
CM	7	Ryszard Tarasiewicz
CM	21	Dariusz Dziekanowski	(yellow card) 13'
CM	8	Jan Urban		(substituted off) 83'
CF	20	Zbigniew Boniek (c)	(yellow card) 30'
CF	11	Włodzimierz Smolarek	(yellow card) 32'
Substitutions:
GK	12	Jacek Kazimierski
DF	3	Władysław Żmuda		(substituted on) 83'
MF	6	Waldemar Matysik
MF	16	Andrzej Pałasz
FW	22	Jan Furtok		(substituted on) 59'
Manager:
Antoni Piechniczek

=== Argentina vs Uruguay ===
16 June 1986
16:00 CST

Argentina	1–0	Uruguay
Pasculli 42'

Estadio Cuauhtémoc, Puebla
Attendance: 26,000
Referee: Luigi Agnolin (Italy)

Argentina	Uruguay

GK	18	Nery Pumpido	(yellow card) 83'
SW	5	José Luis Brown	(yellow card) 49'
CB	19	Oscar Ruggeri
CB	9	José Luis Cuciuffo
DM	14	Ricardo Giusti
DM	2	Sergio Batista		(substituted off) 85'
AM	7	Jorge Burruchaga
LWB	13	Oscar Garré	(yellow card) 30'
SS	10	Diego Maradona (c)
CF	17	Pedro Pasculli
CF	11	Jorge Valdano
Substitutions:
GK	15	Luis Islas
FW	1	Sergio Almirón
DF	8	Néstor Clausen
MF	12	Héctor Enrique
MF	16	Julio Olarticoechea		(substituted on) 85'
Manager:
Carlos Bilardo

GK	12	Fernando Álvez
DF	2	Nelson Gutiérrez
DF	3	Eduardo Acevedo	(yellow card) 58'	(substituted off) 61'
DF	14	Darío Pereyra
DF	15	Eliseo Rivero
MF	5	Miguel Bossio
MF	8	Jorge Barrios (c)
MF	11	Sergio Santín	(yellow card) 68'
MF	10	Enzo Francescoli	(yellow card) 35'
FW	21	Wilmar Cabrera		(substituted off) 46'
FW	19	Venancio Ramos
Substitutions:
GK	1	Rodolfo Rodríguez
FW	7	Antonio Alzamendi
FW	9	Jorge da Silva	(yellow card) 85'	(substituted on) 46'
MF	16	Mario Saralegui
MF	18	Rubén Paz		(substituted on) 61'
Manager:
Omar Borrás

=== Italy vs France ===
17 June 1986
12:00 CST

Italy	0–2	France
		Platini 15'; Stopyra 57'

Estadio Olímpico Universitario, Mexico City
Attendance: 70,000
Referee: Carlos Espósito (Argentina)

Italy	France

GK	1	Giovanni Galli
RB	2	Giuseppe Bergomi
CB	6	Gaetano Scirea (c)
CB	8	Pietro Vierchowod
LB	3	Antonio Cabrini
MF	10	Salvatore Bagni
CM	11	Giuseppe Baresi		(substituted off) 46'
CM	13	Fernando De Napoli	(yellow card) 16'
MF	16	Bruno Conti
FW	19	Giuseppe Galderisi		(substituted off) 58'
FW	18	Alessandro Altobelli
Substitutions:
GK	12	Franco Tancredi
DF	5	Sebastiano Nela
MF	14	Antonio Di Gennaro	(yellow card) 67'	(substituted on) 46'
MF	15	Marco Tardelli
FW	17	Gianluca Vialli		(substituted on) 58'
Manager:
Enzo Bearzot

GK	1	Joël Bats
RB	3	William Ayache	(yellow card) 40'
CB	6	Maxime Bossis
CB	4	Patrick Battiston
LB	2	Manuel Amoros
DM	9	Luis Fernández		(substituted off) 73'
CM	12	Alain Giresse
CM	14	Jean Tigana
AM	10	Michel Platini (c)		(substituted off) 85'
FW	18	Dominique Rocheteau
FW	19	Yannick Stopyra
Substitutions:
GK	22	Albert Rust
DF	7	Yvon Le Roux
MF	8	Thierry Tusseau		(substituted on) 73'
MF	11	Jean-Marc Ferreri		(substituted on) 85'
FW	16	Bruno Bellone
Manager:
Henri Michel

=== Morocco vs West Germany ===
17 June 1986
16:00 CST

Morocco	0–1	West Germany
		Matthäus 88'

Estadio Universitario, San Nicolás de los Garza
Attendance: 19,800
Referee: Zoran Petrović (Yugoslavia)

Morocco	West Germany

GK	1	Badou Zaki (c)
DF	2	Labid Khalifa	(yellow card) 65'
DF	3	Abdelmajid Lamriss	(yellow card) 29'
DF	5	Noureddine Bouyahyaoui
DF	14	Lahcen Ouadani
MF	6	Abdelmajid Dolmy
MF	7	Mustafa El Haddaoui
MF	8	Aziz Bouderbala
MF	10	Mohammed Timoumi
FW	9	Abdelkrim Merry
FW	17	Abderrazak Khairi
Substitutions:
GK	12	Salahdine Hmied
FW	11	Mustafa Merry
MF	16	Azzedine Amanallah
MF	19	Fadel Jilal
MF	21	Abdelaziz Souleimani
Manager:
(Brazil) José Faria

GK	1	Harald Schumacher
SW	17	Ditmar Jakobs
CB	4	Karlheinz Förster
CB	6	Norbert Eder
RWB	14	Thomas Berthold
CM	10	Felix Magath
CM	8	Lothar Matthäus
AM	11	Karl-Heinz Rummenigge (c)
LWB	2	Hans-Peter Briegel
CF	19	Klaus Allofs
CF	9	Rudi Völler	(substituted off) 46'
Substitutions:
GK	22	Eike Immel
DF	3	Andreas Brehme
DF	5	Matthias Herget
MF	7	Pierre Littbarski	(substituted on) 46'
FW	20	Dieter Hoeneß
Manager:
Franz Beckenbauer

=== England vs Paraguay ===
18 June 1986
12:00 CST

England	3–0	Paraguay
Lineker 31', 73'; Beardsley 56'

Estadio Azteca, Mexico City
Attendance: 98,728
Referee: Jamal Al Sharif (Syria)

England	Paraguay

GK	1	Peter Shilton (c)
RB	2	Gary Stevens
CB	5	Alvin Martin	(yellow card) 37'
CB	6	Terry Butcher
LB	3	Kenny Sansom
RM	17	Trevor Steven
CM	4	Glenn Hoddle
CM	16	Peter Reid		(substituted off) 58'
LM	18	Steve Hodge	(yellow card) 67'
SS	20	Peter Beardsley		(substituted off) 80'
CF	10	Gary Lineker
Substitutions:
GK	13	Chris Woods
FW	9	Mark Hateley		(substituted on) 80'
DF	12	Viv Anderson
DF	15	Gary A. Stevens		(substituted on) 58'
FW	19	John Barnes
Manager:
Bobby Robson

GK	1	Roberto Fernández
DF	2	Juan Torales		(substituted off) 64'
DF	3	César Zabala
DF	4	Vladimiro Schettina
DF	5	Rogelio Delgado (c)
MF	6	Jorge Amado Nunes	(yellow card) 60'
MF	10	Adolfino Cañete
MF	8	Romerito
FW	7	Buenaventura Ferreira
FW	11	Alfredo Mendoza
FW	9	Roberto Cabañas
Substitutions:
GK	12	Jorge Battaglia
DF	13	Virginio Cáceres
DF	14	Luis Caballero
MF	16	Jorge Guasch		(substituted on) 64'
FW	20	Ramón Hicks
Manager:
Cayetano Ré

=== Denmark vs Spain ===
18 June 1986
16:00 CST

Denmark	1–5	Spain
J. Olsen 33' (pen.)		Butragueño 43', 56', 80', 88' (pen.); Goikoetxea 68' (pen.)

Estadio La Corregidora, Querétaro
Attendance: 38,500
Referee: Jan Keizer (Netherlands)

Denmark	Spain

GK	22	Lars Høgh
SW	4	Morten Olsen (c)
DF	3	Søren Busk
DF	5	Ivan Nielsen
RWB	9	Klaus Berggreen
DM	12	Jens Jørn Bertelsen
CM	8	Jesper Olsen		(substituted off) 71'
CM	6	Søren Lerby
LWB	21	Henrik Andersen	(yellow card) 26'	(substituted off) 60'
FW	11	Michael Laudrup
FW	10	Preben Elkjær
Substitutions:
GK	16	Ole Qvist
DF	2	John Sivebæk
MF	7	Jan Mølby		(substituted on) 71'
FW	19	John Eriksen		(substituted on) 60'
MF	20	Jan Bartram
Manager:
(Germany) Sepp Piontek

GK	1	Andoni Zubizarreta
RB	2	Tomás
CB	3	José Antonio Camacho (c)	(yellow card) 32'
CB	8	Andoni Goikoetxea	(yellow card) 27'
LB	11	Julio Alberto
RM	21	Míchel	(yellow card) 60'	(substituted off) 83'
CM	5	Víctor
CM	14	Ricardo Gallego
LM	18	Ramón Calderé
FW	19	Julio Salinas		(substituted off) 46'
FW	9	Emilio Butragueño
Substitutions:
GK	22	Juan Carlos Ablanedo
MF	7	Juan Señor
DF	15	Chendo
MF	17	Francisco		(substituted on) 83'
FW	20	Eloy		(substituted on) 46'
Manager:
Miguel Muñoz

== Quarter-finals ==
=== Brazil vs France ===
21 June 1986
12:00 CST

Brazil	1–1 (a.e.t.)	France
Careca 17'		Platini 40'
Penalties
Sócrates (penalty missed); Alemão (penalty scored); Zico (penalty scored); Branco (penalty scored); Júlio César (penalty missed)	3–4	(penalty scored) Stopyra; (penalty scored) Amoros; (penalty scored) Bellone; (penalty missed) Platini; (penalty scored) Fernández

Estadio Jalisco, Guadalajara
Attendance: 65,000
Referee: Ioan Igna (Romania)

Brazil	France

GK	1	Carlos
RB	13	Josimar
CB	14	Júlio César
CB	4	Edinho (c)
LB	17	Branco
DM	19	Elzo
CM	15	Alemão
CM	6	Júnior	(substituted off) 91'
AM	18	Sócrates
SS	7	Müller	(substituted off) 71'
CF	9	Careca
Substitutions:
GK	22	Leão
CB	3	Oscar
CF	8	Casagrande
AM	10	Zico	(substituted on) 71'
AM	20	Silas	(substituted on) 91'
Manager:
Telê Santana

GK	1	Joël Bats
RB	2	Manuel Amoros
CB	6	Maxime Bossis
CB	4	Patrick Battiston
LB	8	Thierry Tusseau
DM	9	Luis Fernández
CM	12	Alain Giresse	(substituted off) 84'
CM	14	Jean Tigana
AM	10	Michel Platini (c)
FW	18	Dominique Rocheteau	(substituted off) 99'
FW	19	Yannick Stopyra
Substitutions:
MF	11	Jean-Marc Ferreri	(substituted on) 84'
FW	16	Bruno Bellone	(substituted on) 99'
Manager:
Henri Michel

=== West Germany vs Mexico ===
21 June 1986
16:00 CST

West Germany	0–0 (a.e.t.)	Mexico
Penalties
Allofs (penalty scored); Brehme (penalty scored); Matthäus (penalty scored); Littbarski (penalty scored)	4–1	(penalty scored) Negrete; (penalty missed) Quirarte; (penalty missed) Servín

Estadio Universitario, San Nicolás de los Garza
Attendance: 41,700
Referee: Jesús Díaz (Colombia)

West Germany	Mexico

GK	1	Harald Schumacher
SW	17	Ditmar Jakobs
CB	4	Karlheinz Förster	(yellow card) 56'
CB	6	Norbert Eder		(substituted off) 116'
RWB	14	Thomas Berthold	(red card) 65'
CM	8	Lothar Matthäus	(yellow card) 86'
CM	3	Andreas Brehme
AM	10	Felix Magath
LWB	2	Hans-Peter Briegel
CF	11	Karl-Heinz Rummenigge (c)		(substituted off) 59'
CF	19	Klaus Allofs	(yellow card) 27'
Substitutions:
GK	22	Eike Immel
DF	5	Matthias Herget
MF	7	Pierre Littbarski		(substituted on) 116'
MF	13	Karl Allgöwer
CF	20	Dieter Hoeneß		(substituted on) 59'
Manager:
Franz Beckenbauer

GK	1	Pablo Larios
DF	18	Rafael Amador		(substituted off) 69'
DF	3	Fernando Quirarte	(yellow card) 27'
DF	14	Félix Cruz
DF	17	Raúl Servín	(yellow card) 83'
MF	7	Miguel España
MF	16	Carlos Muñoz
MF	10	Tomás Boy (c)		(substituted off) 32'
MF	13	Javier Aguirre	(yellow card) 20' (red card) 100'
FW	22	Manuel Negrete
FW	9	Hugo Sánchez	(yellow card) 94'
Substitutions:
GK	20	Olaf Heredia
FW	5	Francisco Javier Cruz		(substituted on) 69'
MF	6	Carlos de los Cobos	(yellow card) 75'	(substituted on) 32'
MF	8	Alejandro Domínguez
FW	15	Luis Flores
Manager:
(Socialist Federal Republic of Yugoslavia) Bora Milutinović

=== Argentina vs England ===
22 June 1986
12:00 CST

Argentina	2–1	England
Maradona 51', 55'		Lineker 81'

Estadio Azteca, Mexico City
Attendance: 114,580
Referee: Ali Bin Nasser (Tunisia)

Argentina	England

GK	18	Nery Pumpido
SW	5	José Luis Brown
CB	9	José Luis Cuciuffo
CB	19	Oscar Ruggeri
RWB	14	Ricardo Giusti
LWB	16	Julio Olarticoechea
DM	2	Sergio Batista	(yellow card) 60'
CM	12	Héctor Enrique
CM	7	Jorge Burruchaga		(substituted off) 75'
SS	10	Diego Maradona (c)
CF	11	Jorge Valdano
Substitutes:
GK	15	Luis Islas
DF	8	Néstor Clausen
FW	17	Pedro Pasculli
MF	20	Carlos Daniel Tapia		(substituted on) 75'
MF	21	Marcelo Trobbiani
Manager:
Carlos Bilardo

GK	1	Peter Shilton (c)
RB	2	Gary M. Stevens
CB	14	Terry Fenwick	(yellow card) 9'
CB	6	Terry Butcher
LB	3	Kenny Sansom
RM	17	Trevor Steven		(substituted off) 74'
CM	4	Glenn Hoddle
CM	16	Peter Reid		(substituted off) 69'
LM	18	Steve Hodge
SS	20	Peter Beardsley
CF	10	Gary Lineker
Substitutes:
GK	13	Chris Woods
MF	8	Ray Wilkins
FW	11	Chris Waddle		(substituted on) 69'
DF	15	Gary A. Stevens
FW	19	John Barnes		(substituted on) 74'
Manager:
Bobby Robson

Match officials

- Assistant referees:
  - Berny Ulloa Morera (Costa Rica)
  - Bogdan Dotchev (Bulgaria)

=== Spain vs Belgium ===
In the 35th minute, Jan Ceulemans put Belgium into the lead with a diving header from six yards out to the right corner after a cross from the left. Juan Señor made it 1–1 in the 85th minute with a swerving shot from outside the penalty area. The match went to extra-time and then to penalties. The only miss during the shoot-out was from Eloy Olaya when Jean-Marie Pfaff saved down low to his right as Belgium won 5–4.

22 June 1986
16:00 CST

Spain	1–1 (a.e.t.)	Belgium
Señor 85'		Ceulemans 35'
Penalties
Señor (penalty scored); Eloy (penalty missed); Chendo (penalty scored); Butragueño (penalty scored); Víctor (penalty scored)	4–5	(penalty scored) Claesen; (penalty scored) Scifo; (penalty scored) Broos; (penalty scored) Vervoort; (penalty scored) L. Van der Elst

Estadio Cuauhtémoc, Puebla
Attendance: 45,000
Referee: Siegfried Kirschen (East Germany)

Spain	Belgium

GK	1	Andoni Zubizarreta
RB	15	Chendo
CB	3	José Antonio Camacho (c)
CB	14	Ricardo Gallego
LB	11	Julio Alberto
RM	2	Tomás	(yellow card) 39'	(substituted off) 46'
CM	5	Víctor
CM	21	Míchel
LM	18	Ramón Calderé	(yellow card) 44'
CF	19	Julio Salinas		(substituted off) 63'
CF	9	Emilio Butragueño
Substitutions:
GK	13	Urruti
MF	7	Juan Señor		(substituted on) 46'
MF	10	Francisco José Carrasco
MF	17	Francisco
FW	20	Eloy		(substituted on) 63'
Manager:
Miguel Muñoz

GK	1	Jean-Marie Pfaff
DF	2	Eric Gerets
DF	5	Michel Renquin
DF	13	Georges Grün	(yellow card) 115'
MF	21	Stéphane Demol	(yellow card) 24'
MF	22	Patrick Vervoort
MF	6	Franky Vercauteren		(substituted off) 106'
MF	8	Enzo Scifo
MF	11	Jan Ceulemans (c)
FW	18	Daniel Veyt		(substituted off) 82'
FW	16	Nico Claesen
Substitutions:
GK	12	Jacky Munaron
MF	3	Franky Van der Elst
DF	14	Leo Clijsters
DF	15	Leo Van der Elst		(substituted on) 106'
DF	19	Hugo Broos		(substituted on) 82'
Manager:
Guy Thys

== Semi-finals ==
=== France vs West Germany ===
25 June 1986
12:00 CST

France	0–2	West Germany
		Brehme 9'; Völler 90'

Estadio Jalisco, Guadalajara
Attendance: 45,000
Referee: Luigi Agnolin (Italy)

France	West Germany

GK	1	Joël Bats
RB	3	William Ayache
CB	6	Maxime Bossis
CB	4	Patrick Battiston
LB	2	Manuel Amoros
DM	9	Luis Fernández	(yellow card) 89'
CM	12	Alain Giresse		(substituted off) 72'
CM	14	Jean Tigana
AM	10	Michel Platini (c)
CF	16	Bruno Bellone		(substituted off) 66'
CF	19	Yannick Stopyra
Substitutions:
GK	22	Albert Rust
DF	7	Yvon Le Roux
MF	13	Bernard Genghini
MF	15	Philippe Vercruysse		(substituted on) 72'
FW	20	Daniel Xuereb		(substituted on) 66'
Manager:
Henri Michel

GK	1	Harald Schumacher
SW	17	Ditmar Jakobs
CB	4	Karlheinz Förster
CB	6	Norbert Eder
RWB	3	Andreas Brehme
CM	8	Lothar Matthäus
CM	21	Wolfgang Rolff
AM	10	Felix Magath	(yellow card) 59'
LWB	2	Hans-Peter Briegel
CF	11	Karl-Heinz Rummenigge (c)		(substituted off) 57'
CF	19	Klaus Allofs
Substitutions:
GK	22	Eike Immel
DF	5	Matthias Herget
FW	7	Pierre Littbarski
FW	9	Rudi Völler		(substituted on) 57'
FW	20	Dieter Hoeneß
Manager:
Franz Beckenbauer

=== Argentina vs Belgium ===
25 June 1986
16:00 CST

Argentina	2–0	Belgium
Maradona 51', 63'

Estadio Azteca, Mexico City
Attendance: 114,500
Referee: Antonio Márquez Ramírez (Mexico)

Argentina	Belgium

GK	18	Nery Pumpido
SW	5	José Luis Brown
CB	9	José Luis Cuciuffo
CB	19	Oscar Ruggeri
DM	2	Sergio Batista
RM	14	Ricardo Giusti
CM	7	Jorge Burruchaga		(substituted off) 85'
CM	12	Héctor Enrique
LM	16	Julio Olarticoechea
SS	10	Diego Maradona (c)
CF	11	Jorge Valdano	(yellow card) 33'
Substitutions:
GK	15	Luis Islas
MF	3	Ricardo Bochini		(substituted on) 85'
DF	13	Oscar Garré
FW	17	Pedro Pasculli
MF	21	Marcelo Trobbiani
Manager:
Carlos Bilardo

GK	1	Jean-Marie Pfaff
SW	21	Stéphane Demol
RB	2	Eric Gerets
CB	13	Georges Grün
CB	5	Michel Renquin		(substituted off) 54'
LB	22	Patrick Vervoort
RM	8	Enzo Scifo
CM	11	Jan Ceulemans (c)
LM	6	Franky Vercauteren
CF	16	Nico Claesen
CF	18	Daniel Veyt	(yellow card) 27'
Substitutions:
GK	12	Jacky Munaron
MF	3	Franky Van der Elst
MF	10	Philippe Desmet		(substituted on) 54'
DF	14	Leo Clijsters
MF	15	Leo Van der Elst
Manager:
Guy Thys

== Match for third place ==
As both were European teams, this was already set pre-match as the second consecutive World Cup in which European teams finished third.

28 June 1986
12:00 CST

Belgium	2–4 (a.e.t.)	France
Ceulemans 11'; Claesen 73'		Ferreri 27'; Papin 43'; Genghini 104'; Amoros 111' (pen.)

Estadio Cuauhtémoc, Puebla
Attendance: 21,000
Referee: George Courtney (England)

Belgium	France

GK	1	Jean-Marie Pfaff	(yellow card) 63'
SW	21	Stéphane Demol
RB	2	Eric Gerets
CB	5	Michel Renquin		(substituted off) 46'
CB	13	Georges Grün
LB	22	Patrick Vervoort
RM	8	Enzo Scifo		(substituted off) 64'
CM	11	Jan Ceulemans (c)
LM	17	Raymond Mommens
CF	18	Daniel Veyt
CF	16	Nico Claesen
Substitutions:
GK	20	Gilbert Bodart
DF	3	Franky Van der Elst		(substituted on) 46'
MF	6	Franky Vercauteren
DF	14	Leo Clijsters
DF	15	Leo Van der Elst		(substituted on) 64'
Manager:
Guy Thys

GK	22	Albert Rust
RB	5	Michel Bibard
CB	4	Patrick Battiston (c)
CB	7	Yvon Le Roux	(substituted off) 56'
LB	2	Manuel Amoros
DM	14	Jean Tigana	(substituted off) 84'
CM	15	Philippe Vercruysse
CM	13	Bernard Genghini
AM	11	Jean-Marc Ferreri
CF	16	Bruno Bellone
CF	17	Jean-Pierre Papin
Substitutions:
GK	21	Philippe Bergeroo
DF	6	Maxime Bossis	(substituted on) 56'
MF	8	Thierry Tusseau	(substituted on) 84'
FW	19	Yannick Stopyra
FW	20	Daniel Xuereb
Manager:
Henri Michel

== Final ==
29 June 1986
12:00 CST

Argentina	3–2	West Germany
Brown 23'; Valdano 56'; Burruchaga 84'		Rummenigge 74'; Völler 81'

Estadio Azteca, Mexico City
Attendance: 114,600
Referee: Romualdo Arppi Filho (Brazil)

Argentina	West Germany

GK	18	Nery Pumpido	(yellow card) 85'
SW	5	José Luis Brown
CB	9	José Luis Cuciuffo
CB	19	Oscar Ruggeri
RWB	14	Ricardo Giusti
LWB	16	Julio Olarticoechea	(yellow card) 77'
DM	2	Sergio Batista
CM	7	Jorge Burruchaga		(substituted off) 90'
CM	12	Héctor Enrique	(yellow card) 81'
SS	10	Diego Maradona (c)	(yellow card) 17'
CF	11	Jorge Valdano
Substitutes:
GK	15	Luis Islas
DF	8	Néstor Clausen
DF	13	Oscar Garré
FW	17	Pedro Pasculli
MF	21	Marcelo Trobbiani		(substituted on) 90'
Manager:
Carlos Bilardo

GK	1	Harald Schumacher
SW	17	Ditmar Jakobs
CB	3	Andreas Brehme
CB	4	Karlheinz Förster
RWB	14	Thomas Berthold
LWB	2	Hans-Peter Briegel	(yellow card) 62'
CM	6	Norbert Eder
CM	8	Lothar Matthäus	(yellow card) 21'
AM	10	Felix Magath		(substituted off) 62'
CF	11	Karl-Heinz Rummenigge (c)
CF	19	Klaus Allofs		(substituted off) 46'
Substitutes:
GK	22	Eike Immel
FW	7	Pierre Littbarski
FW	9	Rudi Völler		(substituted on) 46'
FW	20	Dieter Hoeneß		(substituted on) 62'
MF	21	Wolfgang Rolff
Manager:
Franz Beckenbauer

Assistant referees:
Erik Fredriksson (Sweden)
Berny Ulloa Morera (Costa Rica)
