= Germany at the FIFA World Cup =

International football delegation

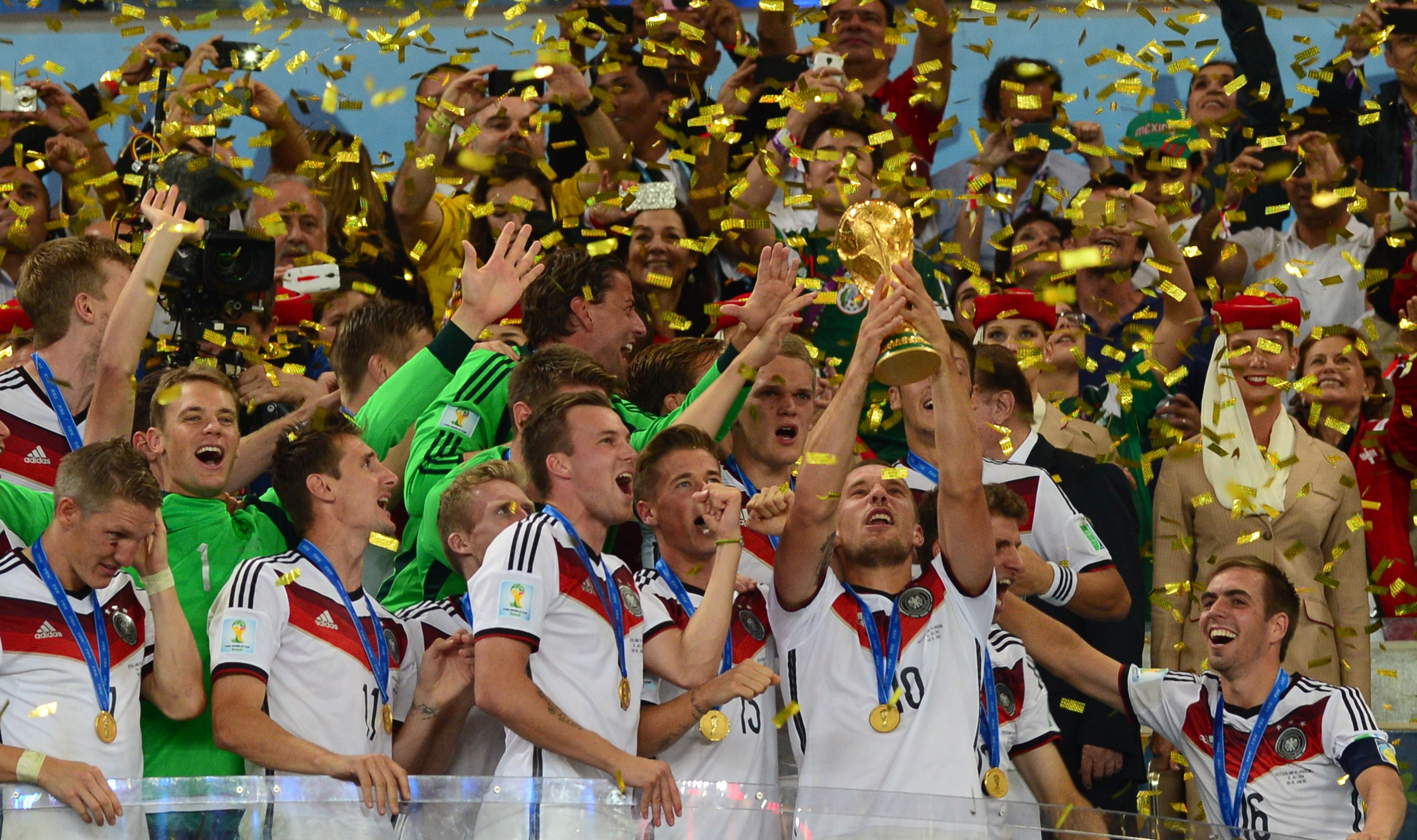
Germany celebrating victory in the 2014 FIFA World Cup in Brazil

This is a record of the men's Germany and West Germany's results at the FIFA World Cup. For Germany's World Cup history, FIFA considers only the teams managed by the German Football Association, comprising three periods: Germany (during Nazi era), West Germany and reunified Germany. The men's Germany national football team is one of the most successful national teams at the FIFA World Cup, winning four titles, earning second-place and third-place finishes four times each and one fourth-place finish. Germany's 12 podium finishes (3rd place or better) in 21 tournaments add up to at least three more than any other nation. In addition, until they failed to reach the round of 16 in 2022 and 2026, Germany was the only team to stand on the podium at least once during the completed decades in which at least one tournament was held (1930s, 1950s, 1960s, 1970s, 1980s, 1990s, 2000s and 2010s). Along with Argentina, Brazil and Spain, they are one of the four national teams to win outside their continental confederation, with the title of the 2014 FIFA World Cup in South America. The team qualified for every FIFA World Cup tournament they have entered (21 out of the 23), the second most frequent, and only failed to reach the quarter-finals four times, in 1938, 2018, 2022 and 2026. With this, Germany's 8th place or better (quarter-finals) in 17 out of 21 tournaments (81%) ranks the second highest in FIFA World Cup finals history, only behind Brazil (19 out of 22 tournaments for a 86%). It makes Germany the best team in the history of the tournament in terms of final positions, if points were awarded proportionally for a title, runner-up finish, third-place finish and semi-final and the second best team in terms of quarter-final appearances.

== Records ==
- 1930–1938 as → → Germany
- 1950–1990 as West Germany
- 1994–present as Germany

Champions Runners-up Third place Tournament played fully or partially on home soil

FIFA World Cup record										Qualification record						
Year	Round	Position	Pld	W	D*	L	GF	GA	Squad	Pld	W	D	L	GF	GA	Campaign
(Uruguay) 1930	Did not enter									Did not enter						—
(Kingdom of Italy) 1934	Third place	3rd	4	3	0	1	11	8	Squad	1	1	0	0	9	1	1934
(French Third Republic) 1938	First round	10th	2	0	1	1	3	5	Squad	3	3	0	0	11	1	1938
(Fourth Brazilian Republic) 1950	Banned from entering									Banned from entering						1950
(Switzerland) 1954	Champions	1st	6	5	0	1	25	14	Squad	4	3	1	0	12	3	1954
(Sweden) 1958	Fourth place	4th	6	2	2	2	12	14	Squad	Qualified as defending champions						1958
(Chile) 1962	Quarter-finals	7th	4	2	1	1	4	2	Squad	4	4	0	0	11	5	1962
(England) 1966	Runners-up	2nd	6	4	1	1	15	6	Squad	4	3	1	0	14	2	1966
(Mexico) 1970	Third place	3rd	6	5	0	1	17	10	Squad	6	5	1	0	20	3	1970
(West Germany) 1974	Champions	1st	7	6	0	1	13	4	Squad	Qualified as hosts						1974
(Argentina) 1978	Quarter-finals (Note: Last 8 held as second group stage.)	6th	6	1	4	1	10	5	Squad	Qualified as defending champions						1978
(Spain) 1982	Runners-up	2nd	7	3	2	2	12	10	Squad	8	8	0	0	33	3	1982
(Mexico) 1986	Runners-up	2nd	7	3	2	2	8	7	Squad	8	5	2	1	22	9	1986
(Italy) 1990	Champions	1st	7	5	2	0	15	5	Squad	6	3	3	0	13	3	1990
(United States) 1994	Quarter-finals	5th	5	3	1	1	9	7	Squad	Qualified as defending champions						1994
(France) 1998	Quarter-finals	7th	5	3	1	1	8	6	Squad	10	6	4	0	23	9	1998
(South Korea) (Japan) 2002	Runners-up	2nd	7	5	1	1	14	3	Squad	10	6	3	1	19	12	2002
(Germany) 2006	Third place	3rd	7	5	1	1	14	6	Squad	Qualified as hosts						2006
(South Africa) 2010	Third place	3rd	7	5	0	2	16	5	Squad	10	8	2	0	26	5	2010
(Brazil) 2014	Champions	1st	7	6	1	0	18	4	Squad	10	9	1	0	36	10	2014
(Russia) 2018	Group stage	22nd	3	1	0	2	2	4	Squad	10	10	0	0	43	4	2018
(Qatar) 2022	Group stage	17th	3	1	1	1	6	5	Squad	10	9	0	1	36	4	2022
(Canada) (Mexico) (United States) 2026	Round of 32	18th	4	2	1	1	11	5	Squad	6	5	0	1	16	3	2026
(Morocco) (Portugal) (Spain) 2030	To be determined									To be determined						
(Saudi Arabia) 2034	To be determined									To be determined						
Total	4 Titles	21/23	116	70	22*	24	243	135	—	110	88	18	4	344	77	Total

* Denotes draws including knockout matches decided via penalty shoot-out.

Germany's World Cup record
First match	Germany 5–2 Belgium (27 May 1934; Florence, Italy)
Biggest win	Germany 8–0 Saudi Arabia (1 June 2002; Sapporo, Japan)
Biggest defeat	Hungary 8–3 West Germany (20 June 1954; Basel, Switzerland)
Best result	Champions in 1954, 1974, 1990, and 2014
Worst result	First round exits in 1938 (straight knockout format), 2018 and 2022 (both group stage exits).

=== Winning World Cups ===
Year	Manager	Captain	Winning goalscorer(s)
1954	Sepp Herberger	Fritz Walter	Helmut Rahn
1974	Helmut Schön	Franz Beckenbauer	Gerd Müller
1990	Franz Beckenbauer	Lothar Matthäus	Andreas Brehme
2014	Joachim Löw	Philipp Lahm	Mario Götze

== FIFA World Cup finals ==
=== 1954 World Cup Final v Hungary ===
Only 14 days before the final, West Germany played the favoured Hungarian Golden Team in the first round of the tournament and suffered a 3–8 loss, which remains their largest World Cup defeat. In the final, Hungary was up by two goals after only eight minutes, so it came as a surprise that the West German team not only quickly equalised but turned the game around in the 84th minute with a goal scored by Helmut Rahn.

4 July 1954
17:00 CET

West Germany	3–2	Hungary
Morlock 10'; Rahn 18', 84'	Report	Puskás 6'; Czibor 8'

Wankdorf Stadium, Bern (Switzerland)
Attendance: 62,500
Referee: William Ling (England)

GK	1	Toni Turek
RB	7	Josef Posipal
CB	10	Werner Liebrich
LB	3	Werner Kohlmeyer
HB	6	Horst Eckel
HB	8	Karl Mai
IR	13	Max Morlock
IL	16	Fritz Walter (c)
OR	12	Helmut Rahn
CF	15	Ottmar Walter
OL	20	Hans Schäfer
Manager:
(West Germany) Sepp Herberger

GK	1	Gyula Grosics
RB	2	Jenő Buzánszky
CB	3	Gyula Lóránt
LB	4	Mihály Lantos
HB	5	József Bozsik
HB	6	József Zakariás
RW	11	Zoltán Czibor
AM	9	Nándor Hidegkuti
LW	20	Mihály Tóth
CF	8	Sándor Kocsis
CF	10	Ferenc Puskás (c)
Manager:
(Hungary) Gusztáv Sebes

=== 1966 World Cup Final v England ===
The strongly contested game between host nation England and West Germany went into extra time after a score of 2-2 after 90 minutes. Geoff Hurst's goal in the 101st minute is one of the most controversial in football history: His shot bounced off the cross-bar onto the ground and back away from the goal. After a brief discussion with the Azerbaijani linesman Tofiq Bahramov, referee Gottfried Dienst awarded the goal. With the West Germans forced to press for the equalizer, Hurst converted a counterattack in the 120th minute and decided the match for England.

30 July 1966
15:00 BST

England	4–2 (a.e.t.)	West Germany
Hurst 18', 101', 120'; Peters 78'	Report	Haller 12'; Weber 89'

Wembley Stadium, London (England)
Attendance: 96,924
Referee: Gottfried Dienst (Switzerland)

GK	1	Gordon Banks
RB	2	George Cohen
CB	5	Jack Charlton
CB	6	Bobby Moore (c)
LB	3	Ray Wilson
DM	4	Nobby Stiles
RM	7	Alan Ball
AM	9	Bobby Charlton
LM	16	Martin Peters	(yellow card) 20'
CF	10	Geoff Hurst
CF	21	Roger Hunt
Manager:
(England) Alf Ramsey

GK	1	Hans Tilkowski
RB	2	Horst-Dieter Höttges
CB	5	Willi Schulz
CB	6	Wolfgang Weber
LB	3	Karl-Heinz Schnellinger
CM	4	Franz Beckenbauer
CM	12	Wolfgang Overath
RF	8	Helmut Haller
CF	9	Uwe Seeler (c)
CF	10	Sigfried Held
LF	11	Lothar Emmerich
Manager:
(West Germany) Helmut Schön

=== 1974 World Cup Final v the Netherlands ===
West Germany reached the final as host nation in 1974 and were facing their neighbours and rivals from the Netherlands. After an early penalty scored by Johan Neeskens, West Germany turned the game around to win their second World Cup trophy.

7 July 1901
16:00 (CET)

Netherlands	1–2	West Germany
Neeskens 2' (pen.)	Report	Breitner 25' (pen.); Müller 43'

Olympiastadion, Munich (West Germany)
Attendance: 75,200
Referee: Jack Taylor (England)

GK	8	Jan Jongbloed
RB	20	Wim Suurbier
CB	17	Wim Rijsbergen		(substituted off) 69'
CB	2	Arie Haan
LB	12	Ruud Krol
RM	6	Wim Jansen
CM	13	Johan Neeskens	(yellow card) 40'
LM	3	Willem van Hanegem	(yellow card) 23'
RF	16	Johnny Rep
CF	14	Johan Cruyff (c)	(yellow card) 45'
LF	15	Rob Rensenbrink		(substituted off) 46'
Substitutes:
GK	18	Piet Schrijvers
DF	5	Rinus Israël
MF	7	Theo de Jong		(substituted on) 69'
MF	10	René van de Kerkhof		(substituted on) 46'
FW	9	Piet Keizer
Manager:
(Netherlands) Rinus Michels

GK	1	Sepp Maier
RB	2	Berti Vogts	(yellow card) 4'
CB	5	Franz Beckenbauer (c)
CB	4	Hans-Georg Schwarzenbeck
LB	3	Paul Breitner
RM	16	Rainer Bonhof
CM	14	Uli Hoeneß
LM	12	Wolfgang Overath
RF	9	Jürgen Grabowski
CF	13	Gerd Müller
LF	17	Bernd Hölzenbein
Substitutes:
GK	21	Norbert Nigbur
DF	6	Horst-Dieter Höttges
MF	8	Bernhard Cullmann
MF	15	Heinz Flohe
FW	11	Jupp Heynckes
Manager:
(West Germany) Helmut Schön

=== 1982 World Cup Final v Italy ===
Paul Breitner became only the third player in World Cup history to have scored in two separate finals, but only after the Italians had already taken a 3–0 lead after 81 minutes.

11 July 1982
20:00 CEST

Italy	3–1	West Germany
Rossi 57'; Tardelli 69'; Altobelli 81'	Report	Breitner 83'

Santiago Bernabéu, Madrid (Spain)
Attendance: 90,000
Referee: Arnaldo Cézar Coelho (Brazil)

GK	1	Dino Zoff (c)
SW	7	Gaetano Scirea
CB	6	Claudio Gentile
CB	5	Fulvio Collovati
RWB	3	Giuseppe Bergomi
LWB	4	Antonio Cabrini
DM	13	Gabriele Oriali	(yellow card) 73'
RM	16	Bruno Conti	(yellow card) 31'
CM	14	Marco Tardelli
LW	19	Francesco Graziani		(substituted off) 7'
CF	20	Paolo Rossi
Substitutions:
GK	12	Ivano Bordon
MF	10	Giuseppe Dossena
MF	11	Giampiero Marini
MF	15	Franco Causio			(substituted on) 89'
FW	18	Alessandro Altobelli		(substituted on) 7'	(substituted off) 89'
Manager:
(Italy) Enzo Bearzot

GK	1	Harald Schumacher
SW	15	Uli Stielike	(yellow card) 73'
RB	20	Manfred Kaltz
CB	4	Karlheinz Förster
LB	5	Bernd Förster
RM	6	Wolfgang Dremmler	(yellow card) 61'	(substituted off) 62'
CM	3	Paul Breitner
LM	2	Hans-Peter Briegel
RW	11	Karl-Heinz Rummenigge (c)		(substituted off) 70'
LW	7	Pierre Littbarski	(yellow card) 88'
CF	8	Klaus Fischer
Substitutions:
GK	21	Bernd Franke
DF	12	Wilfried Hannes
MF	10	Hansi Müller		(substituted on) 70'
MF	14	Felix Magath
FW	9	Horst Hrubesch		(substituted on) 62'
Manager:
(West Germany) Jupp Derwall

=== 1986 World Cup Final v Argentina ===
With the highest attendance ever at a FIFA World Cup final, West Germany faced Argentina in Mexico City. Although the Argentinian star player Diego Maradona was closely guarded by the West German team, he assisted the decisive 3-2 scored by Jorge Burruchaga, ensuring his country's second World Cup win. Late during the match, three yellow cards were given to Argentinians for time wasting.

29 June 1986
12:00 CST

Argentina	3–2	West Germany
Brown 23'; Valdano 56'; Burruchaga 84'	Report	Rummenigge 74'; Völler 81'

Estadio Azteca, Mexico City
Attendance: 114,600
Referee: Romualdo Arppi Filho (Brazil)

GK	18	Nery Pumpido	(yellow card) 85'
SW	5	José Luis Brown
CB	9	José Luis Cuciuffo
CB	19	Oscar Ruggeri
RWB	14	Ricardo Giusti
LWB	16	Julio Olarticoechea	(yellow card) 77'
DM	2	Sergio Batista
CM	12	Héctor Enrique	(yellow card) 81'
AM	7	Jorge Burruchaga		(substituted off) 90'
SS	10	Diego Maradona (c)	(yellow card) 17'
CF	11	Jorge Valdano
Substitutions:
MF	21	Marcelo Trobbiani		(substituted on) 90'
Manager:
(Argentina) Carlos Bilardo

GK	1	Harald Schumacher
SW	17	Ditmar Jakobs
CB	4	Karlheinz Förster
CB	2	Hans-Peter Briegel	(yellow card) 62'
RWB	14	Thomas Berthold
LWB	3	Andreas Brehme
CM	6	Norbert Eder
CM	8	Lothar Matthäus	(yellow card) 21'
AM	10	Felix Magath		(substituted off) 62'
CF	11	Karl-Heinz Rummenigge (c)
CF	19	Klaus Allofs		(substituted off) 46'
Substitutions:
FW	9	Rudi Völler		(substituted on) 46'
FW	20	Dieter Hoeneß		(substituted on) 62'
Manager:
(West Germany) Franz Beckenbauer

=== 1990 World Cup Final v Argentina ===
For this re-match of the 1986 Final, Argentina played extremely defensively. Defender Pedro Monzón became the first player ever to receive a red card in a World Cup final, only to be joined by teammate Gustavo Dezotti 22 minutes later. Although West Germany was the dominating side with 23:1 shots, it is fitting that the rough match was decided by a penalty kick taken by Andreas Brehme.

Franz Beckenbauer achieved the feat to lose and then win a World Cup final each as player (1966, 1974) and manager (1986, 1990).

8 July 1990
20:00 UTC+2

West Germany	1–0	Argentina
Brehme 85' (pen.)	Report

Stadio Olimpico, Rome (Italy)
Attendance: 73,603
Referee: Edgardo Codesal (Mexico)

GK	1	Bodo Illgner
SW	5	Klaus Augenthaler
CB	6	Guido Buchwald
CB	4	Jürgen Kohler
RWB	14	Thomas Berthold		(substituted off) 73'
LWB	3	Andreas Brehme
CM	8	Thomas Häßler
CM	10	Lothar Matthäus (c)
CM	7	Pierre Littbarski
CF	9	Rudi Völler	(yellow card) 52'
CF	18	Jürgen Klinsmann
Substitutes:
GK	12	Raimond Aumann
DF	2	Stefan Reuter		(substituted on) 73'
MF	15	Uwe Bein
MF	20	Olaf Thon
FW	13	Karl-Heinz Riedle
Manager:
(West Germany) Franz Beckenbauer

GK	12	Sergio Goycochea
SW	20	Juan Simón
CB	18	José Serrizuela
CB	19	Oscar Ruggeri		(substituted off) 46'
RWB	4	José Basualdo
LWB	17	Roberto Sensini
DM	13	Néstor Lorenzo
CM	21	Pedro Troglio	(yellow card) 84'
AM	10	Diego Maradona (c)	(yellow card) 87'
CM	7	Jorge Burruchaga		(substituted off) 53'
CF	9	Gustavo Dezotti	(yellow card) 5' (red card) 87'
Substitutes:
GK	22	Fabián Cancelarich
DF	5	Edgardo Bauza
DF	15	Pedro Monzón	(red card) 65'	(substituted on) 46'
MF	6	Gabriel Calderón		(substituted on) 53'
FW	3	Abel Balbo
Manager:
(Argentina) Carlos Bilardo

=== 2002 World Cup Final v Brazil ===
With only one goal conceded during the six matches leading up to the final, hopes were on the German defence to withstand Brazil's star quality strikers. Germany's playmaker Michael Ballack was suspended for the final after picking his second yellow card of the tournament in the semi-final against South Korea. Two goals from Ronaldo in the middle of the second half decided the match in favour of the South Americans and ensured their record fifth title.

30 June 2002
20:00 UTC+9

Germany	0–2	Brazil
	Report	Ronaldo 67', 79'

International Stadium, Yokohama
Attendance: 69,029
Referee: Pierluigi Collina (Italy)

GK	1	Oliver Kahn (c)
CB	2	Thomas Linke
CB	5	Carsten Ramelow
CB	21	Christoph Metzelder
RM	22	Torsten Frings
CM	8	Dietmar Hamann
CM	16	Jens Jeremies		(substituted off) 77'
LM	17	Marco Bode		(substituted off) 84'
AM	19	Bernd Schneider
CF	11	Miroslav Klose	(yellow card) 9'	(substituted off) 74'
CF	7	Oliver Neuville
Substitutes:
FW	20	Oliver Bierhoff		(substituted on) 74'
FW	14	Gerald Asamoah		(substituted on) 77'
MF	6	Christian Ziege		(substituted on) 84'
Manager:
(Germany) Rudi Völler

GK	1	Marcos
CB	3	Lúcio
CB	5	Edmílson
CB	4	Roque Júnior	(yellow card) 6'
RM	2	Cafu (c)
CM	8	Gilberto Silva
CM	15	Kléberson
LM	6	Roberto Carlos
AM	11	Ronaldinho		(substituted off) 85'
CF	10	Rivaldo
CF	9	Ronaldo		(substituted off) 90'
Substitutes:
MF	19	Juninho		(substituted on) 85'
MF	17	Denílson		(substituted on) 90'
Manager:
(Brazil) Luiz Felipe Scolari

=== 2014 World Cup Final v Argentina ===
Despite defeating host country Brazil 7–1, Germany was supported by the home fans due to Brazil's rivalry with Argentina. This record third match-up of two teams in World Cup finals saw good chances for both sides in regular time, but stayed goalless until substitute striker Mario Götze scored during the second half of extra time, in the 113th minute. The fourth title was the first since Germany's reunification in October 1990.

13 July 2014
16:00 UTC−3

Germany	1–0 (a.e.t.)	Argentina
Götze 113'	Report

Estádio do Maracanã, Rio de Janeiro
Attendance: 74,738
Referee: Nicola Rizzoli (Italy)

GK	1	Manuel Neuer
RB	16	Philipp Lahm (c)
CB	20	Jérôme Boateng
CB	5	Mats Hummels
LB	4	Benedikt Höwedes	(yellow card) 34'
CM	23	Christoph Kramer		(substituted off) 31'
CM	7	Bastian Schweinsteiger	(yellow card) 29'
CM	18	Toni Kroos
RW	13	Thomas Müller
LW	8	Mesut Özil		(substituted off) 120'
CF	11	Miroslav Klose		(substituted off) 88'
Substitutions:
FW	9	André Schürrle		(substituted on) 31'
MF	19	Mario Götze		(substituted on) 88'
DF	17	Per Mertesacker		(substituted on) 120'
Manager:
(Germany) Joachim Löw

GK	1	Sergio Romero
RB	4	Pablo Zabaleta
CB	15	Martín Demichelis
CB	2	Ezequiel Garay
LB	16	Marcos Rojo
CM	14	Javier Mascherano	(yellow card) 64'
CM	6	Lucas Biglia
RW	8	Enzo Pérez		(substituted off) 86'
LW	22	Ezequiel Lavezzi		(substituted off) 46'
SS	10	Lionel Messi (c)
CF	9	Gonzalo Higuaín		(substituted off) 78'
Substitutions:
FW	20	Sergio Agüero	(yellow card) 65'	(substituted on) 46'
FW	18	Rodrigo Palacio		(substituted on) 78'
MF	5	Fernando Gago		(substituted on) 86'
Manager:
(Argentina) Alejandro Sabella

== Most appearances ==
Lothar Matthäus is Germany's all-time record appearance maker at FIFA World Cups, with 25 matches played. He is the only German player alongside Manuel Neuer to be fielded in five World Cup tournaments. Neuer also holds the record for most World Cup appearances by a goalkeeper, with 23.

Rank	Player	Matches	World Cups
1	Lothar Matthäus	25	1982, 1986, 1990, 1994 and 1998
2	Miroslav Klose	24	2002, 2006, 2010 and 2014
3	Manuel Neuer	23	2010, 2014, 2018, 2022 and 2026
4	Uwe Seeler	21	1958, 1962, 1966 and 1970
5	Philipp Lahm	20	2006, 2010 and 2014
5	Bastian Schweinsteiger	20	2006, 2010 and 2014
7	Wolfgang Overath	19	1966, 1970 and 1974
7	Berti Vogts	19	1970, 1974 and 1978
7	Karl-Heinz Rummenigge	19	1978, 1982 and 1986
7	Per Mertesacker	19	2006, 2010 and 2014
7	Thomas Müller	19	2010, 2014, 2018 and 2022
12	Franz Beckenbauer	18	1966, 1970 and 1974
12	Sepp Maier	18	1970, 1974 and 1978
12	Thomas Berthold	18	1986, 1990 and 1994

== Top goalscorers ==
Player	Goals	1934	1938	1954	1958	1962	1966	1970	1974	1978	1982	1986	1990	1994	1998	2002	2006	2010	2014	2018	2022	2026
Miroslav Klose	16															5	5	4	2			
Gerd Müller	14							10	4													
Jürgen Klinsmann	11												3	5	3							
Thomas Müller	10																	5	5			
Helmut Rahn	10			4	6																	
Karl-Heinz Rummenigge	9									3	5	1										
Uwe Seeler	9				2	2	2	3														
Rudi Völler	8											3	3	2								
Hans Schäfer	7			4	3																	
Helmut Haller	6						6															
Lothar Matthäus	6											1	4	1								
Max Morlock	6			6																		
Franz Beckenbauer	5						4	1														
Kai Havertz	5																				2	3
Lukas Podolski	5																3	2				
Edmund Conen	4	4																				
Ottmar Walter	4			4																		
Andreas Brehme	4											1	3									
Oliver Bierhoff	4														3	1						
Wolfgang Overath	3							1	2													
Michael Ballack	3															3						
Deniz Undav	3																					3
Total	152	4	0	18	11	2	12	15	6	3	5	6	13	8	6	9	8	11	7	0	2	6

== By match ==
Year	Round	Opponent	Score	Germany scorers
1934	Round of 16	Belgium	5–2	Kobierski, Siffing, Conen (3)
1934	Quarter-final	Sweden	2–1	Hohmann (2)
1934	Semi-final	Czechoslovakia	1–3	Noack
1934	Match for third place	Austria	3–2	Lehner (2), Conen
1938	Round 1	Switzerland	1–1 (a.e.t.)	Gauchel
1938	Round 1 (replay)	Switzerland	2–4	Hahnemann, Lörtscher (o.g.)
1954	Group 2	Turkey	4–1	Schäfer, Klodt, O. Walter, Morlock
1954	Group 2	Hungary	3–8	Pfaff, Rahn, Herrmann
1954	Play-off	Turkey	7–2	O. Walter, Schäfer (2), Morlock (3), F. Walter
1954	Quarter-final	Yugoslavia	2–0	Horvath (o.g.), Rahn
1954	Semi-final	Austria	6–1	Schäfer, Morlock, F. Walter (2), O. Walter (2)
1954	Final	Hungary	3–2	Morlock, Rahn (2)
1958	Group 1	Argentina	3–1	Rahn (2), Seeler
1958	Group 1	Czechoslovakia	2–2	Schäfer, Rahn
1958	Group 1	Northern Ireland	2–2	Rahn, Seeler
1958	Quarter-final	Yugoslavia	1–0	Rahn
1958	Semi-final	Sweden	1–3	Schäfer
1958	Match for third place	France	3–6	Cieslarczyk, Rahn, Schäfer
1962	Group 2	Italy	0–0	—
1962	Group 2	Switzerland	2–1	Brülls, Seeler
1962	Group 2	Chile	2–0	Szymaniak, Seeler
1962	Quarter-final	Yugoslavia	0–1	—
1966	Group 2	Switzerland	5–0	Held, Haller (2), Beckenbauer (2)
1966	Group 2	Argentina	0–0	—
1966	Group 2	Spain	2–1	Emmerich, Seeler
1966	Quarter-final	Uruguay	4–0	Haller (2), Beckenbauer, Seeler
1966	Semi-final	Soviet Union	2–1	Haller, Beckenbauer
1966	Final	England	2–4 (a.e.t.)	Haller, Weber
1970	Group 4	Morocco	2–1	Seeler, G. Müller
1970	Group 4	Bulgaria	5–2	Libuda, G. Müller (3), Seeler
1970	Group 4	Peru	3–1	G. Müller (3)
1970	Quarter-final	England	3–2 (a.e.t.)	Beckenbauer, Seeler, G. Müller
1970	Semi-final	Italy	3–4 (a.e.t.)	Schnellinger, G. Müller (2)
1970	Match for third place	Uruguay	1–0	Overath
1974	Group 1	Chile	1–0	Breitner
1974	Group 1	Australia	3–0	Overath, Cullmann, G. Müller
1974	Group 1	East Germany	0–1	—
1974	Group B	Yugoslavia	2–0	Breitner, G. Müller
1974	Group B	Sweden	4–2	Overath, Bonhof, Grabowski, Hoeneß
1974	Group B	Poland	1–0	G. Müller
1974	Final	Netherlands	2–1	Breitner, G. Müller
1978	Group 2	Poland	0–0	—
1978	Group 2	Mexico	6–0	D. Müller, H. Müller, Rummenigge (2), Flohe (2)
1978	Group 2	Tunisia	0–0	—
1978	Group A	Italy	0–0	—
1978	Group A	Netherlands	2–2	Abramczik, D. Müller
1978	Group A	Austria	2–3	Rummenigge, Hölzenbein
1982	Group 2	Algeria	1–2	Rummenigge
1982	Group 2	Chile	4–1	Rummenigge (3), Reinders
1982	Group 2	Austria	1–0	Hrubesch
1982	Group B	England	0–0	—
1982	Group B	Spain	2–1	Littbarski, Fischer
1982	Semi-final	France	3–3 (a.e.t.) (5–4 p)	Littbarski, Rummenigge, Fischer
1982	Final	Italy	1–3	Breitner
1986	Group E	Uruguay	1–1	Allofs
1986	Group E	Scotland	2–1	Völler, Allofs
1986	Group E	Denmark	0–2	—
1986	Round of 16	Morocco	1–0	Matthäus
1986	Quarter-final	Mexico	0–0 (a.e.t.) (4–1 p)	—
1986	Semi-final	France	2–0	Brehme, Völler
1986	Final	Argentina	2–3	Rummenigge, Völler
1990	Group D	Yugoslavia	4–1	Matthäus (2), Klinsmann, Völler
1990	Group D	United Arab Emirates	5–1	Völler (2), Klinsmann, Matthäus, Bein
1990	Group D	Colombia	1–1	Littbarski
1990	Round of 16	Netherlands	2–1	Klinsmann, Brehme
1990	Quarter-final	Czechoslovakia	1–0	Matthäus
1990	Semi-final	England	1–1 (a.e.t.) (4–3 p)	Brehme
1990	Final	Argentina	1–0	Brehme
1994	Group C	Bolivia	1–0	Klinsmann
1994	Group C	Spain	1–1	Klinsmann
1994	Group C	South Korea	3–2	Klinsmann (2), Riedle
1994	Round of 16	Belgium	3–2	Völler (2), Klinsmann
1994	Quarter-final	Bulgaria	1–2	Matthäus
1998	Group F	United States	2–0	Möller, Klinsmann
1998	Group F	FR Yugoslavia	2–2	Mihajlović (o.g.), Bierhoff
1998	Group F	Iran	2–0	Bierhoff, Klinsmann
1998	Round of 16	Mexico	2–1	Klinsmann, Bierhoff
1998	Quarter-final	Croatia	0–3	—
2002	Group E	Saudi Arabia	8–0	Klose (3), Ballack, Jancker, Linke, Bierhoff, Schneider
2002	Group E	Republic of Ireland	1–1	Klose
2002	Group E	Cameroon	2–0	Bode, Klose
2002	Round of 16	Paraguay	1–0	Neuville
2002	Quarter-final	United States	1–0	Ballack
2002	Semi-final	South Korea	1–0	Ballack
2002	Final	Brazil	0–2	—
2006	Group A	Costa Rica	4–2	Lahm, Klose (2), Frings
2006	Group A	Poland	1–0	Neuville
2006	Group A	Ecuador	3–0	Klose (2), Podolski
2006	Round of 16	Sweden	2–0	Podolski (2)
2006	Quarter-final	Argentina	1–1 (a.e.t.) (4–2 p)	Klose
2006	Semi-final	Italy	0–2 (a.e.t.)	—
2006	Match for third place	Portugal	3–1	Schweinsteiger (2), Petit (o.g.)
2010	Group D	Australia	4–0	Podolski, Klose, T. Müller, Cacau
2010	Group D	Serbia	0–1	—
2010	Group D	Ghana	1–0	Özil
2010	Round of 16	England	4–1	Klose, Podolski, T. Müller (2)
2010	Quarter-final	Argentina	4–0	T. Müller, Klose (2), Friedrich
2010	Semi-final	Spain	0–1	—
2010	Match for third place	Uruguay	3–2	T. Müller, Jansen, Khedira
2014	Group G	Portugal	4–0	T. Müller (3), Hummels
2014	Group G	Ghana	2–2	Götze, Klose
2014	Group G	United States	1–0	T. Müller
2014	Round of 16	Algeria	2–1 (a.e.t.)	Schürrle, Özil
2014	Quarter-final	France	1–0	Hummels
2014	Semi-final	Brazil	7–1	T. Müller, Klose, Kroos (2), Khedira, Schürrle (2)
2014	Final	Argentina	1–0 (a.e.t.)	Götze
2018	Group F	Mexico	0–1	—
2018	Group F	Sweden	2–1	Reus, Kroos
2018	Group F	South Korea	0–2	—
2022	Group E	Japan	1–2	Gündoğan
2022	Group E	Spain	1–1	Füllkrug
2022	Group E	Costa Rica	4–2	Gnabry, Havertz (2), Füllkrug
2026	Group E	Curaçao	7–1	Nmecha, Schlotterbeck, Havertz (2), Musiala, Brown, Undav
2026	Group E	Ivory Coast	2–1	Undav (2)
2026	Group E	Ecuador	1–2	Sané
2026	Round of 32	Paraguay	1–1 (a.e.t.) (3–4 p)	Havertz

== By opponent ==
A * indicates national team is now defunct

Legend
Won more than lost
Won equals lost
Lost more than won

Opponent	Pld	W	D	L	GF	GA	GD	Win %
Argentina	7	4	2	1	12	5	+7	57.14%
Yugoslavia*	6	4	1	1	11	4	+7	66.67%
Sweden	5	4	0	1	11	7	+4	80.00%
England	5	2	2	1	10	8	+2	40.00%
Spain	5	2	2	1	6	5	+1	40.00%
Italy	5	0	2	3	4	9	−5	0.00%
Uruguay	4	3	1	0	9	3	+6	75.00%
Austria	4	3	0	1	12	6	+6	75.00%
Mexico	4	2	1	1	8	2	+6	50.00%
Switzerland	4	2	1	1	10	6	+4	50.00%
France	4	2	1	1	9	9	0	50.00%
Chile	3	3	0	0	7	1	+6	100.00%
United States	3	3	0	0	4	0	+4	100.00%
Netherlands	3	2	1	0	6	4	+2	66.67%
Poland	3	2	1	0	2	0	+2	66.67%
South Korea	3	2	0	1	4	4	0	66.67%
Czechoslovakia*	3	1	1	1	4	5	−1	33.33%
Turkey	2	2	0	0	11	3	+8	100.00%
Australia	2	2	0	0	7	0	+7	100.00%
Portugal	2	2	0	0	7	1	+6	100.00%
Belgium	2	2	0	0	8	4	+4	100.00%
Costa Rica	2	2	0	0	8	4	+4	100.00%
Morocco	2	2	0	0	3	1	+2	100.00%
Ghana	2	1	1	0	3	2	+1	50.00%
Paraguay	2	1	1	0	2	1	+1	50.00%
Brazil	2	1	0	1	7	3	+4	50.00%
Bulgaria	2	1	0	1	6	4	+2	50.00%
Ecuador	2	1	0	1	4	2	+2	50.00%
Algeria	2	1	0	1	3	3	0	50.00%
Hungary	2	1	0	1	6	10	−4	50.00%
Saudi Arabia	1	1	0	0	8	0	+8	100.00%
Curaçao	1	1	0	0	7	1	+6	100.00%
United Arab Emirates	1	1	0	0	5	1	+4	100.00%
Peru	1	1	0	0	3	1	+2	100.00%
Cameroon	1	1	0	0	2	0	+2	100.00%
Iran	1	1	0	0	2	0	+2	100.00%
Ivory Coast	1	1	0	0	2	1	+1	100.00%
Scotland	1	1	0	0	2	1	+1	100.00%
Soviet Union*	1	1	0	0	2	1	+1	100.00%
Bolivia	1	1	0	0	1	0	+1	100.00%
Northern Ireland	1	0	1	0	2	2	0	0.00%
Colombia	1	0	1	0	1	1	0	0.00%
Republic of Ireland	1	0	1	0	1	1	0	0.00%
Tunisia	1	0	1	0	0	0	0	0.00%
Japan	1	0	0	1	1	2	−1	0.00%
East Germany*	1	0	0	1	0	1	−1	0.00%
Serbia	1	0	0	1	0	1	−1	0.00%
Denmark	1	0	0	1	0	2	−2	0.00%
Croatia	1	0	0	1	0	3	−3	0.00%
Total (49)	116	70	22	24	243	135	+108	60.34%

== See also ==
- Germany at the UEFA European Championship
