= 1986 FIFA World Cup final =

World Cup final, held in Mexico

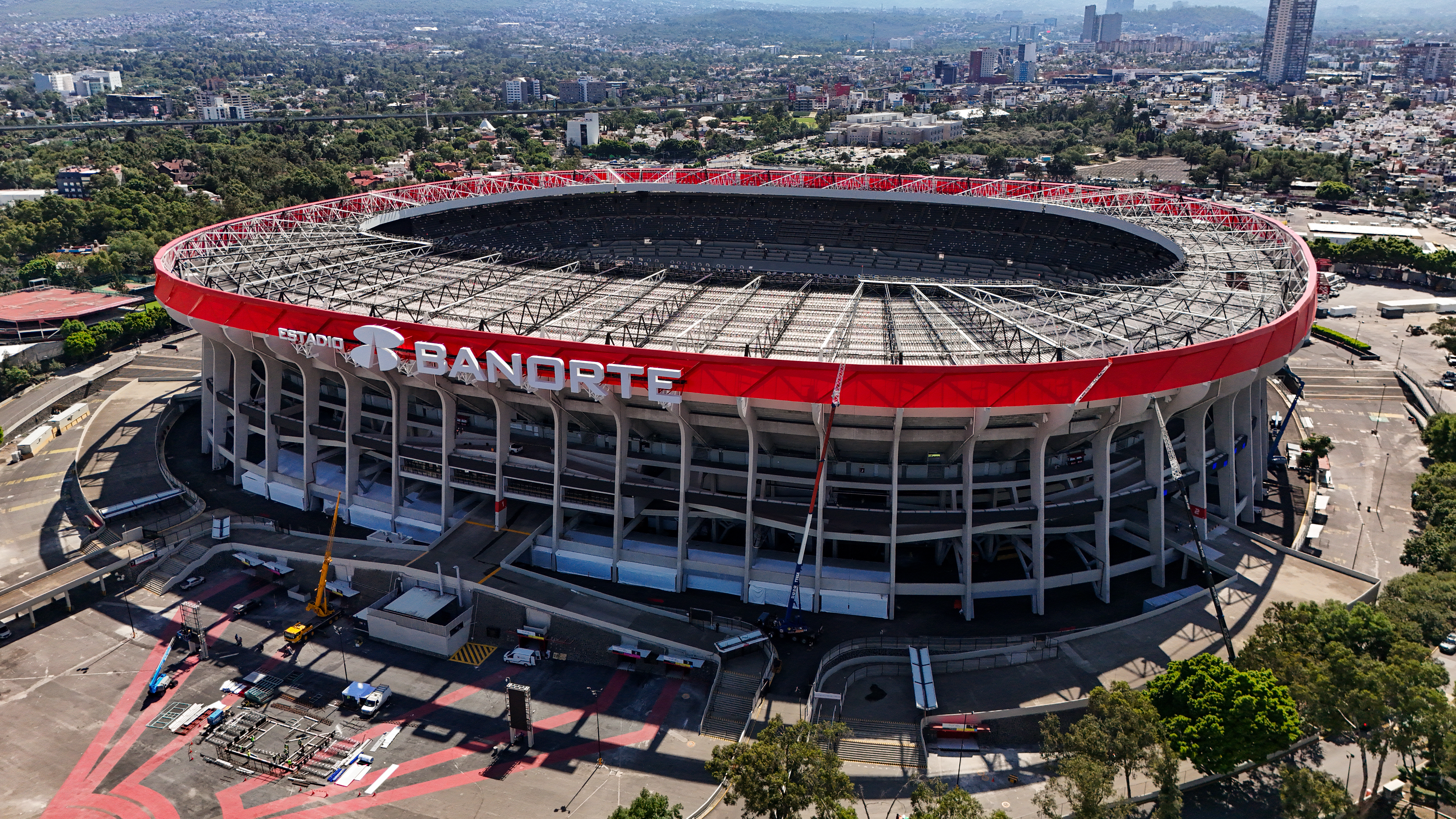
- Estadio Azteca (pictured here in 2026) hosted the final.
- Event: 1986 FIFA World Cup
| Argentina | West Germany |
| 3 | 2 |
- Date: 29 June 1986
- Venue: Estadio Azteca, Mexico City
- Referee: Romualdo Arppi Filho (Brazil)
- Attendance: 114,600

The final match of the 1986 FIFA World Cup, the thirteenth edition of FIFA's football competition for men's national teams, was played at Estadio Azteca in Mexico City on 29 June 1986, and was contested between Argentina and West Germany. The tournament featured host Mexico and defending champions Italy, as well as 22 other teams that emerged from the qualification phase, organized by the six FIFA confederations.

The 24 teams competed in a group stage, where 16 teams qualified for the knockout stage. En route to the final, Argentina finished atop Group A with two wins over South Korea and Bulgaria and one draw against Italy. They then defeated Uruguay in the round of 16, England in the quarter-final, and Belgium in the semi-final. Germany finished second in Group E, drawing against Uruguay, winning over Scotland, and losing to Denmark. They then defeated Morocco in the round of 16, Mexico via a penalty shoot-out in the quarter-final, and France in the semi-final.

The final took place in front of 114,600 supporters, and was referred by Romualdo Arppi Filho from Brazil. In the first half of the match, José Luis Brown opened the scoring with a header for Argentina. Jorge Valdano scored from a low drive shot in the second half to double Argentina's lead before Karl-Heinz Rummenigge pulled a goal back for West Germany in the 74th minute. After West Germany equalised in the 81st minute with a header by Rudi Völler, Jorge Burruchaga netted the ball into the corner three minutes later to seal a 3–2 victory for Argentina.

== Background ==
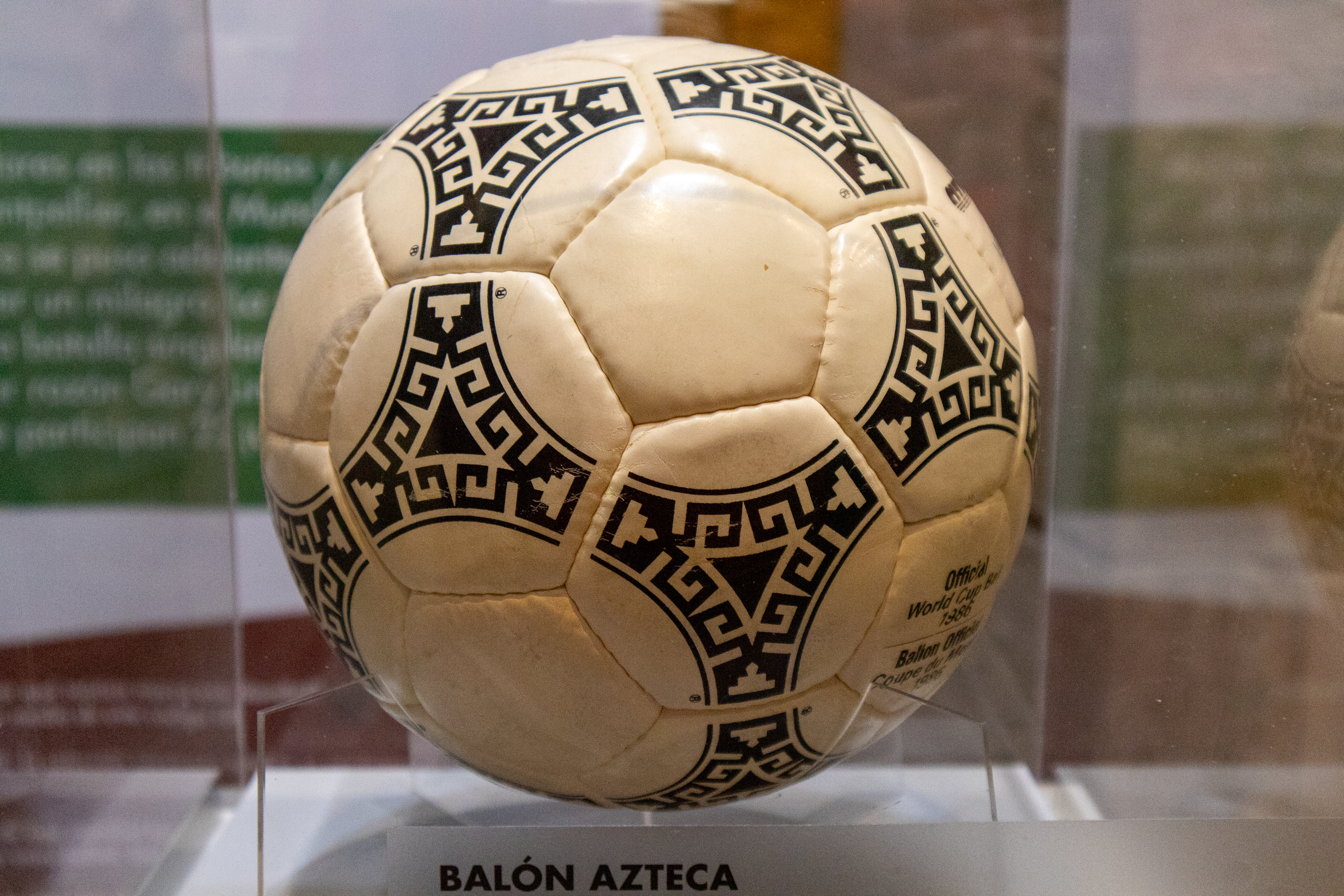
An example of the Adidas Azteca ball used in the match

The 1986 FIFA World Cup was the thirteenth edition of the World Cup, FIFA's football competition for national teams, held in Mexico between 31 May and 29 June 1986. The national teams of Mexico and Italy qualified automatically for the finals – Mexico as hosts and Italy as winners of the previous World Cup in 1982. Mexico had been selected to host the World Cup in May 1983 after Colombia—the original hosts—withdrew in October 1982 due to economic problems. The remaining 22 spots were decided through qualifying rounds held from May 1984 to November 1985, organized by the six FIFA confederations and involving 111 teams. In the finals, the teams were divided into six groups of four, with each team playing each other once in a round-robin format. The top two teams from each group, along with the four third-placed teams, advanced to a knock-out stage. In the tournament, defending champions Italy, one of the favorites to win it, were eliminated in the round of 16 against France.

Argentina had won its first title in 1978 as the host nation, defeating the Netherlands 3–1 in the final. They had finished as runners-up once before in the inaugural tournament, losing to hosts Uruguay in the 1930 final. Similarly, West Germany had won the 1974 tournament as the host nation, beating the Netherlands 2–1 in the final. They had won the World Cup once before in 1954, defeating Hungary in the final, and were runners-up twice in 1966 and 1982. In the previous World Cup, defending champions Argentina were knocked out in the second round of group matches, while West Germany advanced to the final, where they lost to Italy.

The 1986 final was the ninth meeting between Argentina and West Germany, with each team winning three games and two draws. Their first two encounters were at the World Cup, in the group stages of the 1958 and 1966 tournaments; West Germany won 3–1 in 1958, while they drew 0–0 in 1966. The two teams' last meeting before the 1986 World Cup was a friendly match at the Rheinstadion in September 1984, which Argentina won 3–1. Before the tournament, both Argentina and West Germany were among the bookmakers' favorites to win it. The final was played at Estadio Azteca, also known as Aztec Stadium, in southern Coyoacán, a borough of Mexico City. The stadium had previously hosted football games at the 1968 Summer Olympics and the 1970 World Cup, including its final.

The match ball used for the tournament was the Adidas Azteca, which was specifically made for the World Cup. The ball was identical to the Adidas Tango, but its design featured Aztec art with inspiration from the National Museum of Anthropology.

== Route to the final ==
Argentina
Round
West Germany
Opponent
Result
First round
Opponent
Result
South Korea
3–1
Match 1
Uruguay
1–1
Italy
1–1
Match 2
Scotland
2–1
Bulgaria
2–0
Match 3
Denmark
0–2

| Team | Pld | W | D | L | GF | GA | GD | Pts |
|---|---|---|---|---|---|---|---|---|
| Argentina | 3 | 2 | 1 | 0 | 6 | 2 | +4 | 5 |
| Italy | 3 | 1 | 2 | 0 | 5 | 4 | +1 | 4 |
| Bulgaria | 3 | 0 | 2 | 1 | 2 | 4 | −2 | 2 |
| South Korea | 3 | 0 | 1 | 2 | 4 | 7 | −3 | 1 |

Final standing

| Team | Pld | W | D | L | GF | GA | GD | Pts |
|---|---|---|---|---|---|---|---|---|
| Denmark | 3 | 3 | 0 | 0 | 9 | 1 | +8 | 6 |
| West Germany | 3 | 1 | 1 | 1 | 3 | 4 | −1 | 3 |
| Uruguay | 3 | 0 | 2 | 1 | 2 | 7 | −5 | 2 |
| Scotland | 3 | 0 | 1 | 2 | 1 | 3 | −2 | 1 |

Opponent
Result
Knockout stage
Opponent
Result
Uruguay
1–0
Round of 16
Morocco
1–0
England
2–1
Quarter-finals
Mexico
0–0 (aet) (4–1 pen.)
Belgium
2–0
Semi-finals
France
2–0

=== Argentina ===
Argentina qualified for the tournament as Group 1 winners in the South American qualifiers with nine points, winning four games with one draw and loss. They were drawn into Group A, in which they were joined by defending champions Italy, Bulgaria, and South Korea. Their first match was against South Korea at the Estadio Olímpico Universitario on 2 June. Jorge Valdano opened the scoring after five minutes when he received Diego Maradona's header from a free kick and struck a right-footed shot into the far corner of the goal. Argentina was awarded a free kick in the 18th minute, taken by Maradona after he was fouled. Oscar Ruggeri, unmarked in the penalty area, scored with a header past goalkeeper Oh Yun-kyo. One minute into the second half, Maradona's cross was struck into the goal by Valdano from close range. Park Chang-sun then scored with a 25 yards (22 m) curling shot for South Korea in the 72nd minute. Argentina held on to record a 3–1 win. Argentina's second match was against Italy on 5 June. Seven minutes into the game, Oscar Garré touched the ball with his hands in the Argentine penalty area, resulting in a penalty kick for Italy. Alessandro Altobelli took the kick and scored to give Italy the lead. In the 33rd minute, Maradona received Valdano's pass and struck a powerful left-footed shot past Gaetano Scirea and into the far right corner to equalize for Argentina. The match ended with a 1–1 draw. Argentina's last group game was against Bulgaria on 10 June. Argentina took the lead after three minutes when Valdano headed the ball from Claudio Borghi's cross into the goal. In the 76th minute, Jorge Burruchaga received Maradona's pass and scored from the far goalpost to seal a 2–0 victory for Argentina.

Argentina faced Uruguay in the round of 16 on 16 June. Early in the first half, Argentina was awarded a free kick after Pedro Pasculli was fouled 30 yards (27 m) away from goal. Maradona took the kick, which beat Fernando Álvez, but it hit the crossbar. Three minutes before the end of the first half, Valdano scored the only goal of the game when he struck a low shot from close range, giving Argentina a 1–0 win. In the quarter-final, Argentina faced rivals England at Estadio Azteca on 22 June. Although both sides had several chances to score in the first half, Argentina took the lead in the 51st minute when Maradona used his left hand to beat Peter Shilton and struck Valdano's curving shot into the goal. Maradona later said that the goal "was scored a little bit with the hand of God and a little bit of [his] head". Four minutes later, Maradona received a pass close to the halfway line and ran past five English players before beating Shilton to double Argentina's lead. The goal was voted the "Goal of the Century" by FIFA in May 2002. With ten minutes remaining, Gary Lineker scored from a header for England after receiving a pass from John Barnes. Argentina held on for a 2–1 win. In the semi-final, Argentina played Belgium on 25 June. After a goalless first half, Maradona gave Argentina the lead in the 51st minute when he received a pass from Burruchaga and struck a left-footed shot past Jean-Marie Pfaff and into the goal. Twelve minutes later, Maradona received a pass from José Luis Cuciuffo and struck a 10 yards (9 m) left-footed shot to beat Pfaff and seal a 2–1 win for Argentina.

=== West Germany ===
After qualifying for the tournament as Group 2 winners in the European qualifiers, West Germany were drawn into Group E, alongside Denmark, Uruguay, and Scotland. Their first match was against Uruguay at the Estadio Corregidora on 4 June. Uruguay took the lead after five minutes when Antonio Alzamendi intercepted Lothar Matthäus's pass and kicked the ball past Toni Schumacher, which bounced off the crossbar and over the goal line. With five minutes remaining, Klaus Allofs received a pass and struck a 12 yards (10 m) left-footed shot into the far corner to equalize for Germany. The match ended with a 1–1 draw. In their second game, West Germany faced Scotland on 8 June. Seventeen minutes into the game, Gordon Strachan hit Roy Aitken's pass past Schumacher and into the goal. Five minutes later, Hans-Peter Briegel hit a low shot across the 6-yard box, and Rudi Völler scored to level the game. In the 51st minute, Klaus Allofs, unmarked, hit a 12 yards (10 m) shot to beat Jim Leighton and scored to seal West Germany a 2–1 win. Their last group game was against World Cup debutants Denmark on 13 June. One minute before the end of first-half halftime, Denmark was awarded a penalty after Morten Olsen was fouled by Wolfgang Rolff. Olsen took the kick into the left corner and scored to give Denmark the lead. In the 62nd minute, John Eriksen, who had come on as a substitute, received Frank Arnesen's cross and scored his World Cup debut goal.

In the round of 16, West Germany faced Morocco at the Estadio Universitario on 17 June. With two minutes remaining, Lothar Matthäus struck a 35 yards (32 m) curling shot from a free kick to score the only goal of the game. West Germany's opponents in the quarter-final were hosts Mexico on 21 June. There was no scoring during regular time and extra time, resulting in a penalty shoot-out. West Germany began the shootout with Allofs, followed by Manuel Negrete for Mexico. German goalkeeper Toni Schumacher then saved Fernando Quirarte and Raúl Servin's shots, followed by Pierre Littbarski scoring for West Germany. West Germany won the shootout 4–1. In the semi-final, West Germany played France at Estadio Jalisco on 25 June. Nine minutes into the game, West Germany was awarded a free kick after Karl-Heinz Rummenigge was fouled near the edge of the penalty box. Andreas Brehme nodded the ball to Andreas Brehme, who struck a 20 yards (18 m) left-footed shot toward the goal. Goalkeeper Joël Bats was unable to hold the ball in, and West Germany took the lead. With seconds before the end of regular time, Voeller clipped the ball over Joël Bats and kicked it into the French goal. West Germany progressed to the final for the second consecutive time and fifth overall.

== Match ==
=== Pre-match ===
Romualdo Arppi Filho of Brazil refereed the final. Earlier in the 1986 World Cup, Filho had refereed the France–Soviet Union match in the group stage and Mexico–Bulgaria in the round of 16. He had previously officiated the finals of the Campeonato Brasileiro Série A in 1984 and 1985, the 1984 Intercontinental Cup, and had taken part in the Summer Olympics in 1968, 1980, and 1984.

=== Summary ===
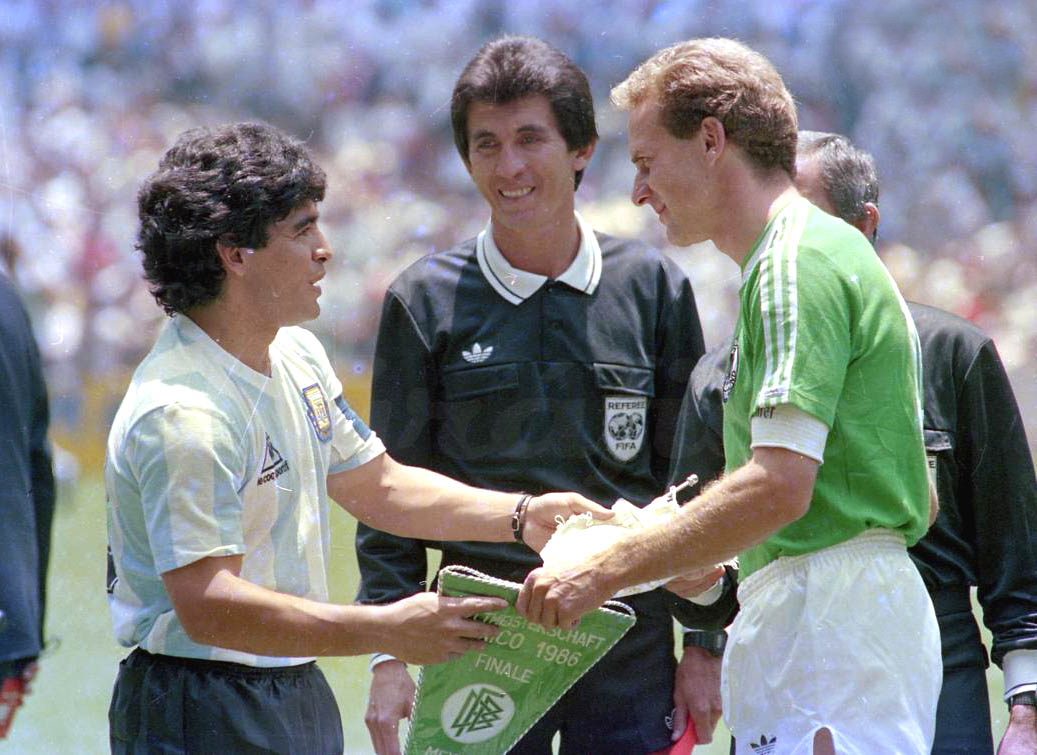
Argentina captain Diego Maradona and West Germany captain Karl-Heinz Rummenigge.

External videos
- Argentina v West Germany | 1986 FIFA World Cup Final | Full Match

The final took place on 29 June 1986, at Estadio Azteca in front of 114,600 supporters, and was refereed by Romualdo Arppi Filho from Brazil. In the 16th minute, West Germany was awarded a free kick after José Luis Brown fouled Hans-Peter Briegel on the edge of the penalty area. The free kick was retaken after the Argentine wall refused to move back 10 yards (9 m). In the 22nd minute, Lothar Matthäus was booked for a foul on Maradona, followed by a free kick taken by Burruchaga. The ball reached José Luis Brown, who met with a powerful header into the goal. West Germany had a chance to score sometime in the first half when Thomas Berthold met with a header from Karl-Heinz Rummenigge's cross, but it went wide of the goal. In the 56th minute, Héctor Enrique received Maradona's pass and passed it to Valdano, who hit a low drive shot into the far corner of the goal.

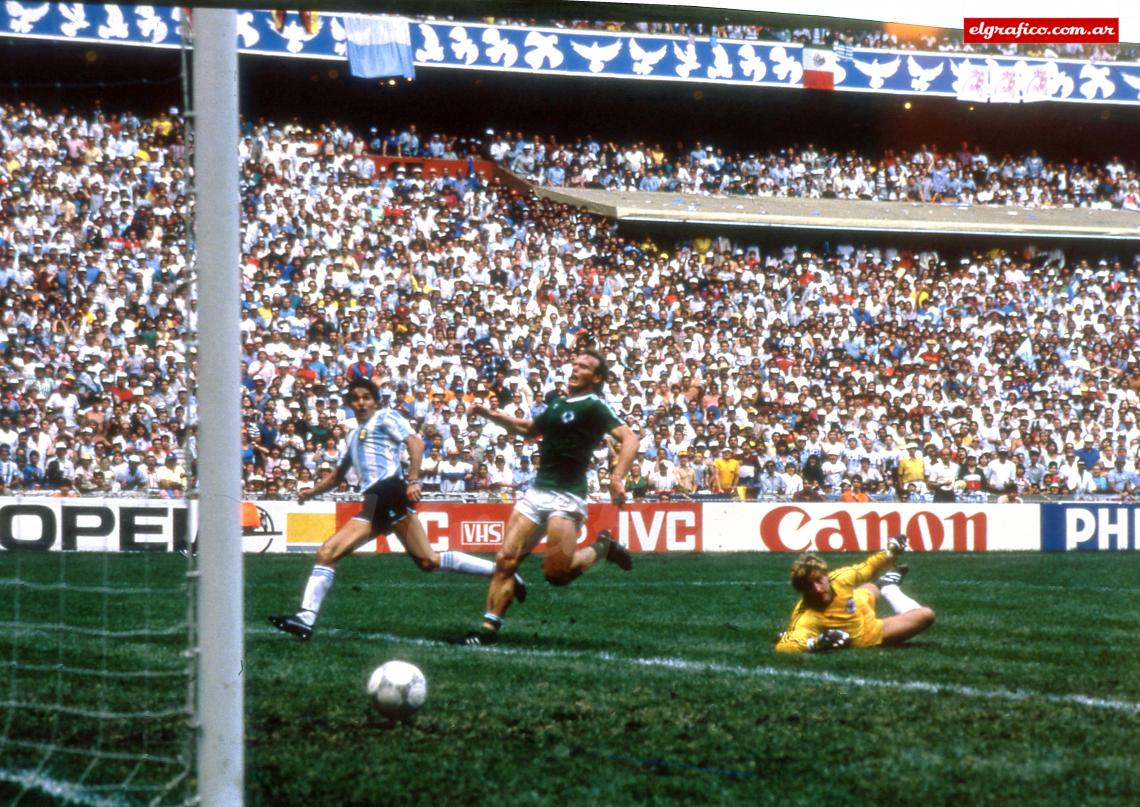
Argentina's Jorge Burruchaga scores the winning goal of the match.

Five minutes later, West Germany made a substitution with Dieter Hoeneß coming on in place of Felix Magath. In the 74th minute, Andreas Brehme took a corner kick into the Argentine penalty area, where Rudi Voeller headed the ball to Rummenigge, who kicked it past Nery Pumpido and from close range for West Germany. Eight minutes later, Berhme took another corner kick, where Ditmar Jakobs met with a header to Völler, who headed the ball into the Argentine goal from close range to equalize the score. Six minutes before the end of regular time, Jorge Burruchaga received Maradona's pass on the right side and hit a shot past Toni Schumacher and into the far side of the goal. The match ended 3–2, and Argentina won their second title.

=== Details ===
29 June 1986
12:00 CST

| Argentina | 3–2 | West Germany |
|---|---|---|
| Brown 23'; Valdano 56'; Burruchaga 84' | | Rummenigge 74'; Völler 81' |

Estadio Azteca, Mexico City
Attendance: 114,600
Referee: Romualdo Arppi Filho (Brazil)

| Argentina | West Germany |

| GK | 18 | Nery Pumpido | (yellow card) 85' |
| SW | 5 | José Luis Brown |
| CB | 9 | José Luis Cuciuffo |
| CB | 19 | Oscar Ruggeri |
| RWB | 14 | Ricardo Giusti |
| LWB | 16 | Julio Olarticoechea | (yellow card) 77' |
| DM | 2 | Sergio Batista |
| CM | 7 | Jorge Burruchaga | | (substituted off) 90' |
| CM | 12 | Héctor Enrique | (yellow card) 81' |
| SS | 10 | Diego Maradona (c) | (yellow card) 17' |
| CF | 11 | Jorge Valdano |
Substitutes:
| GK | 15 | Luis Islas |
| DF | 8 | Néstor Clausen |
| DF | 13 | Oscar Garré |
| FW | 17 | Pedro Pasculli |
| MF | 21 | Marcelo Trobbiani | | (substituted on) 90' |
Manager:
Carlos Bilardo

| GK | 1 | Harald Schumacher |
| SW | 17 | Ditmar Jakobs |
| CB | 3 | Andreas Brehme |
| CB | 4 | Karlheinz Förster |
| RWB | 14 | Thomas Berthold |
| LWB | 2 | Hans-Peter Briegel | (yellow card) 62' |
| CM | 6 | Norbert Eder |
| CM | 8 | Lothar Matthäus | (yellow card) 21' |
| AM | 10 | Felix Magath | | (substituted off) 62' |
| CF | 11 | Karl-Heinz Rummenigge (c) |
| CF | 19 | Klaus Allofs | | (substituted off) 46' |
Substitutes:
| GK | 22 | Eike Immel |
| FW | 7 | Pierre Littbarski |
| FW | 9 | Rudi Völler | | (substituted on) 46' |
| FW | 20 | Dieter Hoeneß | | (substituted on) 62' |
| MF | 21 | Wolfgang Rolff |
Manager:
Franz Beckenbauer

Assistant referees:
Erik Fredriksson (Sweden)
Berny Ulloa Morera (Costa Rica)

Match rules:

- 90 minutes
- 30 minutes of extra-time if necessary
- Penalty shoot-out if scores still level
- Five substitutes named, of which two may be used

== Aftermath ==
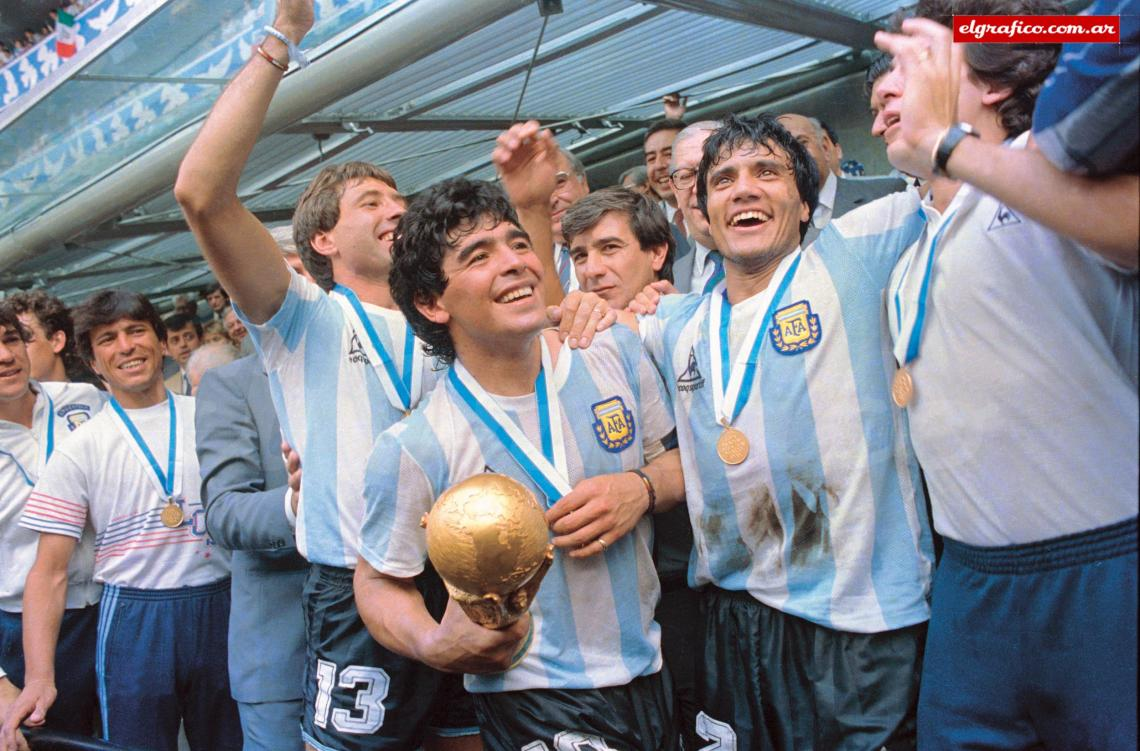
Diego Maradona, holding the FIFA World Cup Trophy, celebrates with the Argentina team.

FIFA president João Havelange handed the trophy to Diego Maradona. Argentine manager Carlos Bilardo believed their victory was due to a "triumph of teamwork". After the match, Argentine president Raúl Alfonsín contacted the team and told them that they set an "example for all of our country."

German president Richard von Weizsäcker described the match as "fair and dramatic" and congratulated Argentina on their victory. At the subsequent World Cup in 1990, Argentina and West Germany contested the final, in which the latter won 1–0.

== See also ==
- Argentina at the FIFA World Cup
- Germany at the FIFA World Cup
