= Stéphane Demol =

Belgian footballer (1966–2023)

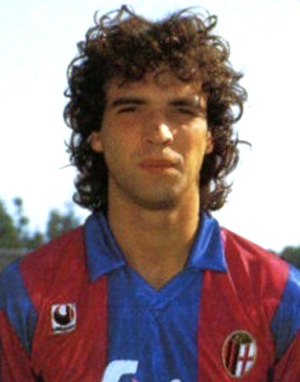
- Demol with Bologna in 1988

Personal information
- Full name: Stéphane Auguste Ernest Demol
- Date of birth: 11 March 1966
- Place of birth: Watermael-Boitsfort, Belgium
- Date of death: 22 June 2023 (aged 57)
- Place of death: Brussels, Belgium
- Height: 1.88 m (6 ft 2 in)
- Position: Centre back

Youth career
- 1974–1980: Drogenbos
- 1980–1984: Anderlecht

Senior career*
Years	Team	Apps	(Gls)
1984–1988	Anderlecht	52	(6)
1988–1989	Bologna	21	(2)
1989–1990	Porto	31	(11)
1990–1991	Toulouse	33	(2)
1991–1993	Standard Liège	56	(5)
1993–1994	Cercle Brugge	12	(0)
1994–1995	Braga	3	(0)
1995	Panionios	3	(0)
1995–1996	Lugano	6	(0)
1996–1998	Toulon	27	(1)
1998–1999	Denderleeuw	6	(1)
1999–2000	Halle		
Total		250	(28)

International career
1986–1991	Belgium	38	(1)

Managerial career
- 1999–2000: Halle (player-coach)
- 2000–2001: Turnhout
- 2001–2002: KFC Geel
- 2002–2003: Mechelen
- 2003: Denderleeuw
- 2004–2005: Egaleo
- 2005–2006: Standard Liège (assistant)
- 2006–2008: Belgium (assistant)
- 2008–2009: Ethnikos Achna
- 2009: Charleroi
- 2010: Aris Limassol
- 2010–2011: PAS Giannina
- 2012: FC Brussels
- 2012–2013: BEC Tero Sasana
- 2014–2015: Al-Faisaly
- 2015–2016: Hajer
- * Club domestic league appearances and goals

Stéphane Auguste Ernest Demol (11 March 1966 – 22 June 2023) was a Belgian professional football player and manager who played as a central defender.

Demol amassed Belgian First Division A totals of 120 games and 11 goals over the course of seven seasons, mainly with Anderlecht and Standard Liège with which he won eight major titles combined. He also competed professionally in Italy, Portugal, France, Greece and Switzerland. At international level, he represented Belgium in two FIFA World Cups, in 1986 and 1990.

In 2000 he started a managerial career, going on to work in several countries.

== Club career ==
Born in Watermael-Boitsfort, Brussels, Demol joined local R.S.C. Anderlecht's youth system at the age of 14, moving to the first-team setup four years later and scoring four Belgian First Division A goals in just 17 matches in his first full professional season, as the Brussels side renewed their domestic supremacy.

Demol soon became noticed by several clubs abroad, moving to Italy for Bologna FC, but his breakthrough would arrive the following year, in Portugal with FC Porto: he scored an astonishing 11 Primeira Liga goals, and helped his team win the national championship.

Demol moved countries again after just one year, now signing with French side Toulouse FC, but he returned in late 1991 to his country after joining Standard Liège, where he helped to consecutive UEFA Cup qualifications, finishing second to Anderlecht in his second year.

Aged 27, Demol signed with Cercle Brugge, but did not receive regular playing time. He subsequently returned for another abroad spell, being equally unsuccessful for S.C. Braga, Panionios, FC Lugano and Sporting Toulon Var (the latter in the French second division).

Demol ended his career in 2000 at 34, after playing one year apiece with FC Denderleeuw and amateurs SK Halle, in which he began his managerial career.

== International career ==
Demol played 38 matches for the Belgium national team and scored one goal, heading home in the round-of-16 clash against the Soviet Union at the 1986 FIFA World Cup in Mexico (4–3 after extra time).

== Managerial career ==
In 2005, after several brief head coaching spells, Demol became assistant manager at former club Standard Liège, helping it to another runner-up position in the 2005–06 season, trailing, once again, Anderlecht.

In 2006, his good friend and ex-teammate René Vandereycken became the Red Devils' coach, and he invited Demol to become its assistant manager. He left the post two years later, returning to club action.

On 2 November 2009, Demol quit R. Charleroi S.C. due to poor results. On 15 February 2012, he was appointed at FC Brussels.

== Death ==
Demol died from a cardiac arrest on 22 June 2023, at the age of 57.

== Career statistics ==
Score and result list Belgium's goal tally first, score column indicates score after Demol's goal.

International goal scored by Stéphane Demol
No.	Date	Venue	Opponent	Score	Result	Competition
1	15 June 1986	Estadio León, León, Mexico	Soviet Union	3–2	4–3 (a.e.t.)	1986 FIFA World Cup

== Honours ==
=== Player ===
Anderlecht

- Belgian First Division: 1984–85, 1985–86, 1986–87
- Belgian Cup: 1987–88
- Belgian Supercup: 1985, 1987

Porto

- Primeira Liga: 1989–90

Standard Liège

- Belgian Cup: 1992–93

Belgium

- FIFA World Cup fourth place: 1986

=== Individual ===
- Kicker FIFA World Cup All-Star Team: 1986
- Best foreign player in the Primeira Liga: 1989-1990
- World Soccer Magazine World XI: 1990
