= Michel Renquin =

Belgian football coach and former player

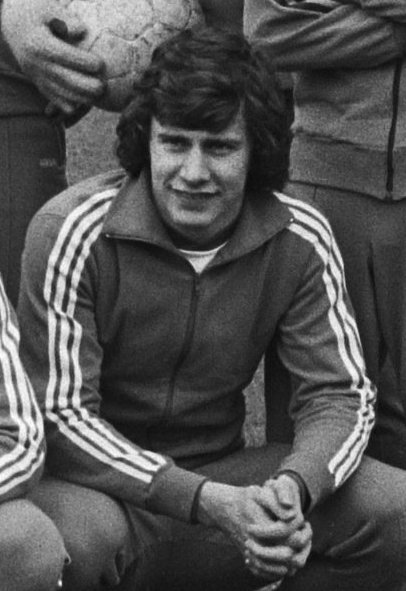

Personal information
- Date of birth: 3 November 1955 (age 70)
- Place of birth: Bastogne, Belgium
- Height: 1.80 m (5 ft 11 in)
- Position: Defender

Senior career*
| Years | Team | Apps | (Gls) |
| 1974–1981 | Standard de Liège | 224 | (4) |
| 1981–1982 | R.S.C. Anderlecht | 16 | (0) |
| 1982–1985 | Servette FC | 68 | (1) |
| 1985–1988 | Standard de Liège | 52 | (0) |
| 1988–1990 | FC Sion | 35 | (0) |
| Total | | 395 | (5) |

International career
| 1976–1987 | Belgium | 55 | (0) |

Managerial career
- 1991–1993: Servette FC
- 1993–1995: FC Renens
- 1997–1998: OGC Nice
- 1999–2000: CS Chênois
- 2000–2003: SR Delémont
- 2003–2004: R.E. Virton
- 2006: Standard de Liège (assistant coach)
- 2006–2007: C.S. Visé
- * Club domestic league appearances and goals

Michel Renquin (born 3 November 1955) is a former football player and current coach. He won 55 caps for the Belgium national football team.

He coached mostly in Switzerland.

== Playing career ==
- Before 1974: JFC Wibrin
- 1974–1981: Standard de Liège
- 1981–1982: R.S.C. Anderlecht
- 1982–1985: Servette FC
- 1985–1988: Standard de Liège
- 1988–1990: FC Sion

== Honours ==
=== Club ===
Standard Liège

- Belgian Cup: 1980–81
- Belgian League Cup: 1975

==== Servette Genève ====
- Swiss Cup: 1983–84
- Swiss Championship: 1984-85

=== International ===
Belgium

- UEFA European Championship: 1980 (runners-up)
- FIFA World Cup: 1986 (fourth place)
- Belgian Sports Merit Award: 1980
