= Patrick Vervoort =

Belgian footballer

Personal information
- Full name: Patrick Felix Vervoort
- Date of birth: 17 January 1965 (age 61)
- Place of birth: Beerse, Belgium
- Height: 1.79 m (5 ft 10 1/2 in)
- Position: Midfielder

Youth career
- Beerschot VAC

Senior career*
Years	Team	Apps	(Gls)
1982–1987	Beerschot VAC	143	(13)
1987–1990	RSC Anderlecht	87	(10)
1990–1991	Bordeaux	29	(7)
1991–1992	Ascoli Calcio	17	(0)
1992–1994	Standard de Liège	42	(4)
1994–1996	RKC Waalwijk	10	(0)
1996–1997	Vitória S.C.	8	(0)
1997–1998	Toulon	3	(0)
1998–1999	KFC Schoten SK	35	(1)
Total		374	(35)

International career
1986–1991	Belgium	32	(3)
- * Club domestic league appearances and goals

Patrick Felix Vervoort (born 17 January 1965 in Beerse) is a retired Belgian footballer.

The left midfielder has played for a number of clubs, including Beerschot, Anderlecht and Standard Liège in Belgium, Ascoli in Italy's Serie A, as well Girondins de Bordeaux in France.

He was also a member of the Belgium team in the 1986 and 1990 World Cups.

== Honours ==
=== Player ===
RSC Anderlecht

- Belgian Cup: 1987–88, 1988–89
- Belgian Supercup: 1985, 1987
- European Cup Winners' Cup: 1989–90 (runners-up)

Standard Liège

- Belgian Cup: 1992–93

=== International ===
Belgium

- FIFA World Cup: 1986 (fourth place)
