= Azzedine Amanallah =

Moroccan footballer

Personal information
- Date of birth: April 7, 1956 (age 70)
- Place of birth: Marrakesh, Morocco
- Height: 1.76 m (5 ft 9 in)
- Position: Midfielder

Senior career*
| Years | Team | Apps | (Gls) |
| 1974–1983 | Difaa El Jadida | ? (?) | |
| 1983–1986 | Besançon RC | 93 | (20) |
| 1986–1988 | Chamois Niortais FC | 68 | (5) |
| 1988–1990 | EA Guingamp | 32 | (1) |

International career
| | Morocco | ? (?) | |
- * Club domestic league appearances and goals

Azzedine Amanallah (born April 7, 1956) is a Moroccan retired professional football player.

He spent his most of his professional career in France and was also part of the Moroccan squad at the 1986 FIFA World Cup.
