= Leo Van der Elst =

Belgian footballer

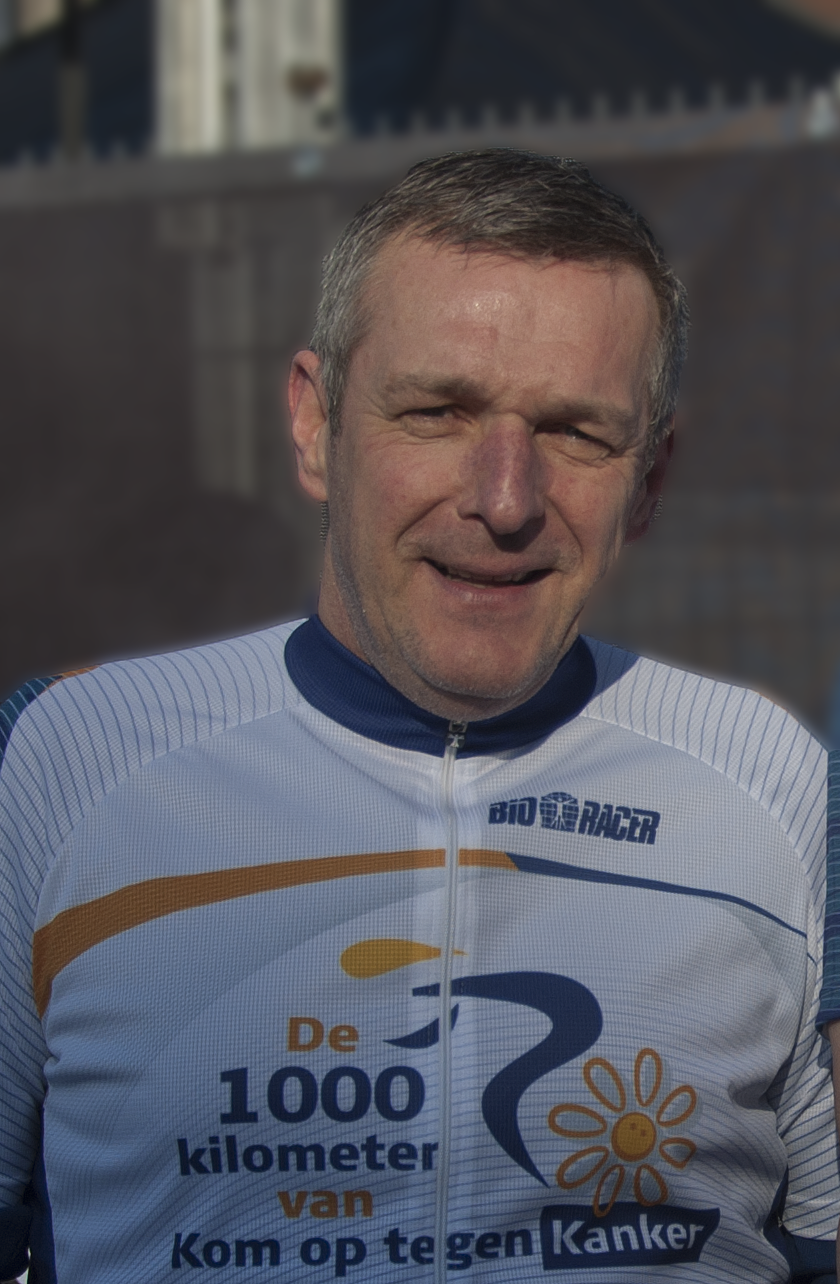
- Van der Elst in 2012

Personal information
- Date of birth: 7 January 1962 (age 64)
- Place of birth: Opwijk, Belgium
- Height: 1.80 m (5 ft 11 in)
- Position: Midfielder

Youth career
- HO Merchtem

Senior career*
Years	Team	Apps	(Gls)
1979–1984	Antwerp	150	(25)
1984–1988	Club Brugge	123	(30)
1988	Metz	13	(1)
1988–1989	RKC	17	(1)
1989–1990	Charleroi	29	(1)
1990–1994	Genk	83	(10)
1994–1995	Eendracht Aalst	21	(1)
Total		436	(69)

International career
1984–1987	Belgium	13	(0)

Managerial career
- 1999–2000: Oostende
- 2002–2003: Eendracht Aalst
- * Club domestic league appearances and goals

Leo Van der Elst (born 7 January 1962) is a Belgian retired footballer who played mainly as a midfielder. He amassed Belgian Pro League totals of 406 games and 67 goals over the course of 15 seasons, mainly in representation of Antwerp, Club Brugge and Genk. His older brother, François, was also a professional footballer, and both were Belgian internationals.

== Football career ==
Van der Elst was born in Opwijk. During his career he played for Royal Antwerp FC, Club Brugge KV (where he often partnered namesake Franky, contributing with five goals in 30 games to the conquest of the 1987–88 edition of the Belgian First Division A), FC Metz, RKC Waalwijk, R. Charleroi SC, K.R.C. Genk and V.C. Eendracht Aalst 2002, retiring in 1995 at 33; subsequently, he began a coaching career.

Van der Elst earned 13 caps for Belgium and was selected, alongside Franky, to the 1986 FIFA World Cup. There, in the quarter-final clash against Spain, he scored the penalty shootout decider after the 1–1 in regulation time.

== Honours ==
=== Club ===
Club Brugge

- Belgian Pro League: 1987–88
- Belgian Cup: 1985–85
- Belgian Supercup: 1986
- Bruges Matins: 1984

=== International ===
Belgium

- FIFA World Cup: 1986 (fourth place)

=== Individual ===
- Man of the Season (Belgian First Division): 1989–90
