= Pedro Pasculli =

Argentine footballer (born 1960)

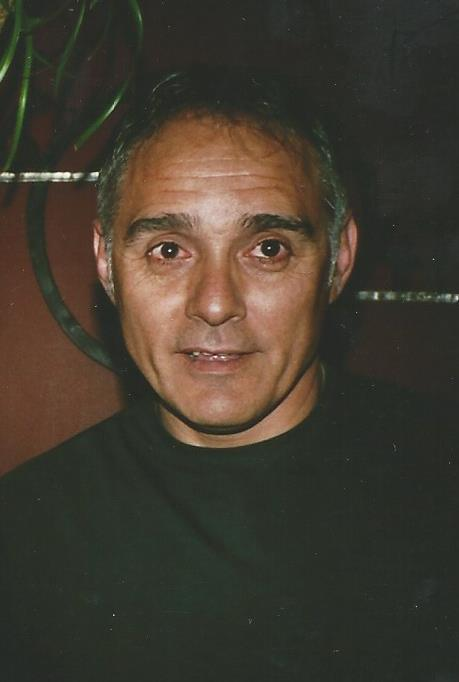
- Pasculli in 2006

Personal information
- Full name: Pedro Pablo Pasculli
- Date of birth: 17 May 1960 (age 66)
- Place of birth: Santa Fe, Argentina
- Height: 1.72 m (5 ft 7 1/2 in)
- Position: Striker

Team information
- Current team: Bangor City (technical secretary)

Senior career*
Years	Team	Apps	(Gls)
1977–1980	Colón de Santa Fe	24	(6)
1980–1985	Argentinos Juniors	203	(87)
1985–1992	Lecce	214	(54)
1993	Newell's Old Boys	5	(0)
1994	PJM Futures	29	(5)
1995–1996	Casertana	17	(4)
1996–1997	Pelita Jaya	22	(9)
Total		492	(156)

International career
1984–1987	Argentina	16	(4)

Managerial career
- 2000–2001: Virtus Entella
- 2001–2002: Pietro Vernotico
- 2002–2003: Verbania
- 2003: Uganda
- 2004: Dinamo Tirana
- 2005: Dinamo Tirana
- 2006–2007: Horatiana Venosa
- 2007–2008: Toma Maglie
- 2010–2011: Paternò
- 2012: Cittanova Interpiana
- 2012–2013: Bocale
- 2013–2015: Sector Juvenil Lecce
- 2017: Torres
- 2019–2020: Bangor City
- 2022: Virtus Lanciano
Medal record
Men's football
Representing Argentina
FIFA World Cup
Winner	1986 Mexico
- * Club domestic league appearances and goals

Pedro Pablo Pasculli (born 17 May 1960) is an Argentine former footballer who played as a forward.

He spent most of his career with Argentinos Juniors and Italian club Lecce. At international level, he won the 1986 FIFA World Cup with Argentina, and came fourth at the 1987 Copa América.

Pasculli's management career was mostly spent in the lower leagues of Italian football. He also had a few months in charge of Uganda in 2003, two brief spells at Dinamo Tirana in Albania and a season with Bangor City in Wales.

== Playing career ==
Born in Santa Fe, Pasculli played as a striker for Colón de Santa Fe and Argentinos Juniors in his native Argentina, partnering Diego Maradona at the latter. In 1985 he moved to U.S. Lecce in Italy, where he became their second highest goalscorer of all time. He retired from professional football in 1996, after playing for Casertana F.C. also in Italy, helping the club to gain promotion to Serie C2 (4th division). He ended his football career with Pelita Jaya in Indonesia.

At international level, Pasculli won the FIFA World Cup with the Argentina national football team in 1986. He started their first match against South Korea alongside Jorge Valdano, and scored the only goal in the victory against Uruguay in the round of 16, but was unused for the rest of the tournament.

Although Pasculli was chosen for the 1987 Copa América, in which Argentina came fourth on home soil, he did not play any matches in the tournament.

== Coaching career ==
Following his retirement as a player in 1996, Pasculli began working as a coach, mainly in the lower leagues of Italian football.

Pasculli became manager of Uganda in May 2003, and led the team to a goalless draw with Sudan in his first match in Kampala. He managed the team despite being unable to speak English. In June, he missed the team's crucial 2004 Africa Cup of Nations qualifiers against Rwanda and Ghana, as his father, whom he had not seen for over two years, was gravely ill in Argentina. In September, he left the Cranes after turning down a US$24,000 contract that his agent called too low, and the representative also alleged that Pasculli had not been paid what was promised for his work.

In September 2004, Pasculli was hired by FK Dinamo Tirana of the Albanian Superliga. An article on UEFA's website called his team "lacklustre" the following month. He was replaced as manager by Faruk Sejdini, and returned to the helm in January 2005 when the latter was dismissed, and Pasculli then became director of football in March.

On 5 October 2019, Pasculli was appointed manager of Bangor City in the Cymru North, the second tier of Welsh football, after former chairman Stephen Vaughan Jr. stepped down following a 7–0 loss to Prestatyn Town. His link to the club was through new owner Domenico Serafino, an Italian musician who lived in Argentina. At the end of the season, having failed to win promotion, he was replaced by his compatriot Hugo Colace.

== Playing honours ==
=== Club ===
Argentinos Juniors

- Primera División Argentina: Metropolitano 1984, Nacional 1985

=== International ===
Argentina

- FIFA World Cup: 1986

=== Individual ===
- Argentina Primera División top scorer: Nacional 1984
