= World Business Forum =

Annual business conference

- World Business Forum Stage at Radio City Music Hall in New York
- Status: Active
- Genre: Conference - 2 day event
- Frequency: Annually
- Locations: New York City, NY, United States
- Inaugurated: 2004; 22 years ago
- Participants: Between 2,000 and 5,000 top-level business executives
- Organiser: WOBI
- Website: wbf.wobi.com/wbf/wbf-nyc/

The World Business Forum is an annual global business conference in New York City and other cities around the world that is operated by WOBI.

The forum was founded in 1988 by WOBI and the conference was first held in New York City in 2004. It subsequently spread to other major cities worldwide, including Milan, Madrid, Mexico City, Bogotá, and Sydney. A 2008 Burson-Marsteller survey ranked the forum among the world's top five most influential venues for the C-Suite executives.

The yearly summit brings together an average of over 5,000 attendees, mostly senior executives from over 60 countries. The Forum consists of discussions of top political leaders, business leaders, and intellectuals about the current issues and challenges of the world business environment and global economy.

== History ==
The World Business Forum in New York City was launched in 2004.

Past speakers in the World Business Forum included political figures such as Bill Clinton, Kofi Annan, Rudy Giuliani, Tony Blair and Colin Powell. Other speakers have been CEOs Jack Welch, Richard Branson, Herb Kelleher and John Chambers, financial experts Alan Greenspan, Ben Bernanke, and Jeremy Siegel, and management experts Tom Peters, Peter Drucker, Malcolm Gladwell, and Michael Porter among others.

The event has been held at a number of different convention centres such as the Radio City Music Hall over the years, in 2024 the New York event was held at the Javits Center in New York.

== Organizer ==
The event is organized by WOBI, an executive education and management content firm which has been holding business conferences globally for over 20 years under the names World Business Forum and ExpoManagement. In addition to the World Business Forum in New York, WOBI organizes business forums around the world as well as other forums including the WOBI On Innovation.
