= José Luis Brown =

Argentine footballer and coach (1956–2019)

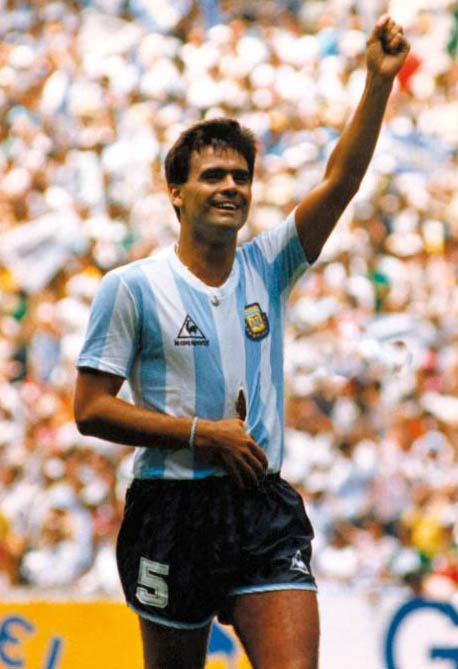
- Brown playing with Argentina in the 1986 World Cup final

Personal information
- Full name: José Luis Brown
- Date of birth: 10 November 1956
- Place of birth: Ranchos, Argentina
- Date of death: 12 August 2019 (aged 62)
- Place of death: La Plata, Argentina
- Height: 1.83 m (6 ft 0 in)
- Position: Centre back

Senior career*
Years	Team	Apps	(Gls)
1975–1983	Estudiantes LP	291	(25)
1983–1984	Atlético Nacional	35	(2)
1985	Boca Juniors	9	(4)
1986	Deportivo Español	5	(0)
1986–1987	Brest	31	(1)
1987–1989	Murcia	28	(1)
1989	Racing Club	9	(1)
Total		461	(46)

International career
1983–1989	Argentina	36	(1)

Managerial career
- 1995: Los Andes
- 1996: Boca Juniors (assistant)
- 2000–2001: Club Almagro
- 2001–2002: Nueva Chicago
- 2002: Blooming
- 2003–2004: Estudiantes LP (youth)
- 2004–2005: Atlético Rafaela
- 2005–2006: Club Almagro
- 2006–2007: Ben Hur
- 2007–2008: Ferro Carril Oeste
- 2007–2009: Argentina U17
- 2013: Ferro Carril Oeste
Medal record
Men's football
Representing Argentina
FIFA World Cup
Winner	1986 Mexico
- * Club domestic league appearances and goals

José Luis Brown (10 November 1956 – 12 August 2019) was an Argentine football central defender and coach.

Most of his 14-year professional career was spent with the La Plata-based Estudiantes, for which he appeared in more than 300 official matches and won two major titles. He also competed in Colombia, France and Spain.

Nicknamed Tata, Brown represented the Argentina national team at the 1986 World Cup and three Copa América tournaments, winning the former and scoring the opening goal in the final. In 1995, he began working as a manager.

== Playing career ==
=== Club ===
Born in Ranchos, Buenos Aires, Brown spent his first years as a senior with Estudiantes de La Plata, scoring an astonishing 17 goals in a combined 69 matches as the club won the Metropolitano and Nacional in the 1982 and 1983 editions of the Primera División, respectively.

After two years in Colombia with Atlético Nacional, Brown played in quick succession for Boca Juniors and Deportivo Español back in his homeland, moving abroad again in 1986 after signing with Ligue 1 side Stade Brestois 29. The following year he joined Spain's Real Murcia on a two-year contract, making his La Liga debut on 30 August 1987 in a 0–1 away loss against CA Osasuna.

Brown retired from football in late 1989 at the age of 33, after some months with Racing Club de Avellaneda.

=== International ===
Brown won 36 caps for Argentina, making his first appearance in 1983. He was selected for the 1983, 1987 and 1989 Copa América tournaments, helping the national team to third place in the latter.

Brown was also picked for the 1986 FIFA World Cup by manager Carlos Bilardo, as a last-minute addition: in spite of a serious knee injury suffered two years earlier that had not still fully healed, he was chosen to start ahead of ageing Daniel Passarella, being informed by the coach on the day before the opener. He went on to play all the games and minutes in Mexico, netting his only international goal, a header in the final against West Germany after a free kick by Jorge Burruchaga (eventual 3–2 win); five minutes into the second half he dislocated his shoulder, but refused to be substituted.

== Coaching career ==
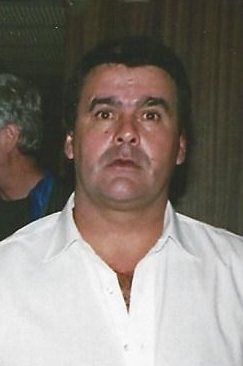
Brown in 2006, while serving as coach

After retiring, Brown worked as an assistant for different managers, including Oscar Ruggeri at San Lorenzo de Almagro and Bilardo at Boca Juniors. His first head coach experience arrived in 1995 at the helm of lowly Los Andes de Lomas de Zamora, and five years later he was appointed at newly promoted Club Almagro with another former national teammate, Héctor Enrique.

After one season the duo moved to Club Atlético Nueva Chicago, but had to resign after only 11 matches due to poor results. In 2002, Brown was hired by Club Blooming in Bolivia, again being fired early into his tenure.

Brown again reunited with Bilardo in 2003–04, being in charge of Estudiantes' youth sides. In the following years, in quick succession, he was in charge of Atlético de Rafaela, Almagro, Club Sportivo Ben Hur and Club Ferro Carril Oeste.

In December 2007, Brown became coach of the Argentine under-17 team as Sergio Batista was put at the helm of the under-20s. As the latter's assistant at the 2008 Summer Olympics the country won the gold medal, and the pair later joined Diego Maradona's staff at the full side.

Brown led Argentina under-17s to the second place at the 2009 South American Football Championship, with the subsequent qualification to the World Cup of the category, which ended with a round-of-16 exit at the hands of Colombia. In March 2013 he returned to Ferro Carril, with the club still in Primera B Nacional.

== Personal life and death ==
Brown was unrelated to the Scottish family of the same surname that produced six Argentina internationals in the early 20th century. His son Juan was also a footballer, who played in Argentina and Bolivia.

Brown's club and international manager Bilardo mispronounced his name as Bron, which he never corrected due to his respect towards the man who gave him his debut. He died on 12 August 2019 in La Plata at the age of 62, due to Alzheimer's disease.

== Honours ==
=== Club ===
Estudiantes

- Primera División: 1982 Metropolitano, 1983 Nacional

=== International ===
Argentina

- FIFA World Cup: 1986
