= Jorge Valdano =

Argentine footballer and manager

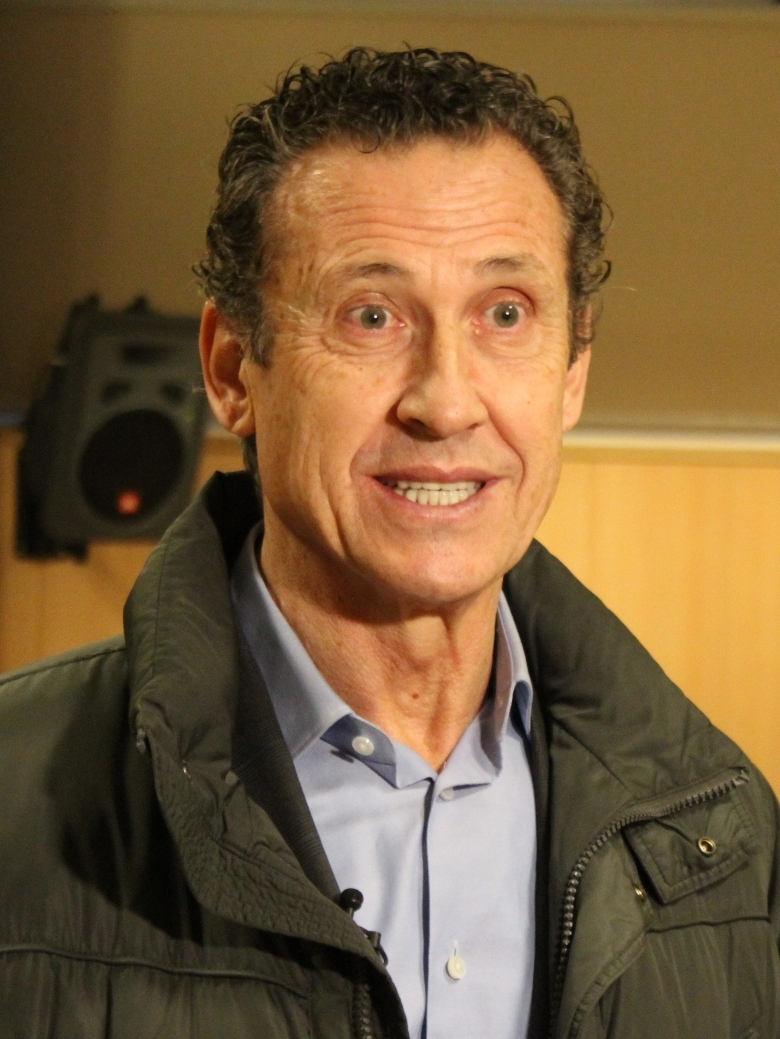
- Valdano in 2018

Personal information
- Full name: Jorge Alberto Francisco Valdano Castellanos
- Date of birth: 4 October 1955 (age 71)
- Place of birth: Las Parejas, Argentina
- Height: 1.88 m (6 ft 2 in)
- Position: Forward

Senior career*
Years	Team	Apps	(Gls)
1973–1975	Newell's Old Boys	46	(11)
1975–1979	Alavés	105	(20)
1979–1984	Real Zaragoza	143	(46)
1984–1987	Real Madrid	85	(40)
Total		379	(117)

International career
1975–1990	Argentina	23	(7)

Managerial career
- 1991–1992: Real Madrid (youth)
- 1992–1994: Tenerife
- 1994–1996: Real Madrid
- 1996–1997: Valencia
Medal record
Men's football
Representing Argentina
FIFA World Cup
Winner	1986 Mexico
- * Club domestic league appearances and goals

Jorge Alberto Francisco Valdano Castellanos (born 4 October 1955) is an Argentine former football player, coach, and the former general manager of Real Madrid. He is currently working as a commentator for beIN Sports. Nicknamed The Philosopher of Football, he played as a forward.

With the Argentina national team, Valdano took part at the 1975 Copa América as well as the 1982 and 1986 FIFA World Cups, the latter of which Argentina won. He had a major influence in the 1986 win, scoring four goals in the tournament, including Argentina's second goal against West Germany in the final. In total, he earned 23 caps for his nation between 1975 and 1990, scoring seven goals.

Although he initially played for Newell's Old Boys, Alavés and Real Zaragoza, his most successful period at club level was at Real Madrid, where he won La Liga twice, the Copa de la Liga and two UEFA Cups. As a manager, he coached Spanish sides Tenerife, Real Madrid and Valencia. Considered a benchmark for the way he addressed various football clubs, Valdano participated in 2013 at the World Leadership Forum and in the World Business Forum in Mexico City, where he associated the world of sports and business behind it, where he listed the 11 powers of leadership, based on his last book.

== Playing career ==
=== Club ===
Valdano started playing when he was 16 years old for Rosario's club Newell's Old Boys, where he also started playing professionally, as well as with the Argentina national football team, in 1972.

In 1975, he was transferred to Alavés of the Spanish Segunda División, where he played until 1979. In that year, he moved to Real Zaragoza of the Primera División, and then to Real Madrid in 1984, playing with the Quinta del Buitre. He helped them win the UEFA Cup in 1985 and 1986, scoring once in the 1985 final and twice in the 1986 final.

Stricken by hepatitis, he decided to retire in 1988 and became a sports commentator. His last official match for Real was 4–2 defeat against Red Star Belgrade on 4th of March 1987.

=== International ===
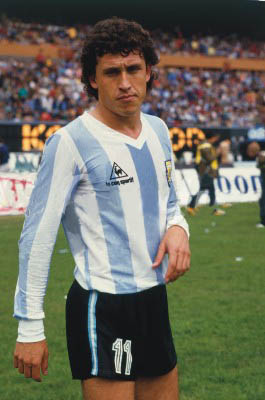
Valdano playing for Argentina in 1985

Valdano played 23 times for the Argentina national team between 1975 and 1990, scoring seven goals, four of them in the 1986 FIFA World Cup, including one against West Germany in the final, which Argentina went on to win. Other than the 1986 triumph, he also took part in the 1975 Copa América and the 1982 World Cup, but missed most of the latter tournament after being injured in Argentina's second game, against Hungary.

== Managerial career ==
Valdano began his management career as the Real Madrid youth team coach. In April 1992, just before the end of the 1991–92 season, he became head coach of Tenerife, replacing fellow Argentinian Jorge Solari. He helped Tenerife avoid relegation at the end of 1991–92, and then the following season helped them qualify for the UEFA Cup. He also twice led Tenerife to final day victories that denied his former club Real Madrid winning the La Liga title (Barcelona winning it instead on both occasions). He then returned to Real Madrid in 1994, now as a coach, and led them to the 1994–95 Liga title.

He finally coached Valencia in 1996–97 before becoming Real Madrid's sporting director in 2000 until his resignation in June 2005. In June 2009, he again returned to Real Madrid as director general and presidential aide. He was sacked from the position on 25 May 2011, however, after his relationship with the coaching staff, particularly head coach José Mourinho, had deteriorated.

== Personal life ==
Valdano wrote the book Sueños de fútbol ("Dreams of football") and edited the book Cuentos de fútbol ("Football short stories") by diverse authors.

Real Madrid's former captain Raúl named his first-born son in honour of Valdano.

== Career statistics ==
=== Club ===
Appearances and goals by club, season and competition
Club	Season	League			National Cup		Continental		Other		Total	
Club	Season	Division	Apps	Goals	Apps	Goals	Apps	Goals	Apps	Goals	Apps	Goals
Newell's Old Boys	1973	Primera División	2	1	–		–		–		2	1
Newell's Old Boys	1974	Primera División	19	4	–		–		–		19	4
Newell's Old Boys	1975	Primera División	25	6	–		4	3	–		29	9
Newell's Old Boys	Total		46	11	0	0	4	3	0	0	50	14
Alavés	1975–76	Segunda División	24	3	0	0	–		2 (Note: Appearances in Segunda División relegation play-offs)	1	26	4
Alavés	1976–77	Segunda División	30	8	0	0	–		–		30	8
Alavés	1977–78	Segunda División	26	4	8	1	–		–		34	5
Alavés	1978–79	Segunda División	25	5	6	0	–		–		31	5
Alavés	Total		105	20	14	1	0	0	2	1	121	22
Real Zaragoza	1979–80	La Liga	34	9	6	4	–		–		40	13
Real Zaragoza	1980–81	La Liga	17	3	0	0	–		–		17	3
Real Zaragoza	1981–82	La Liga	29	9	9	9	–		–		38	18
Real Zaragoza	1982–83	La Liga	34	17	4	3	–		6 (Note: Appearances in Copa de la Liga)	4	44	24
Real Zaragoza	1983–84	La Liga	29	8	4	5	–		–		33	13
Real Zaragoza	Total		143	46	23	21	0	0	6	4	172	71
Real Madrid	1984–85	La Liga	26	17	2	0	10	4	2	2	40	23
Real Madrid	1985–86	La Liga	32	16	4	1	11	7	–		47	24
Real Madrid	1986–87	La Liga	27	7	2	1	4	1	–		33	9
Real Madrid	Total		85	40	8	2	25	12	2	2	120	56
Career total			379	117	45	24	29	15	10	7	463	163

=== International ===
Appearances and goals by national team and year
National team	Year	Apps	Goals
Argentina	1975	2	2
Argentina	1976	0	0
Argentina	1977	0	0
Argentina	1978	0	0
Argentina	1979	0	0
Argentina	1980	0	0
Argentina	1981	0	0
Argentina	1982	5	0
Argentina	1983	0	0
Argentina	1984	0	0
Argentina	1985	5	1
Argentina	1986	8	4
Argentina	1987	1	0
Argentina	1988	0	0
Argentina	1989	0	0
Argentina	1990	2	0
Total		23	7

Scores and results list Argentina's goal tally first, score column indicates score after each Valdano goal.

List of international goals scored by Jorge Valdano
No.	Date	Venue	Opponent	Score	Result	Competition	Ref.
1	18 July 1975	Estadio Centenario, Montevideo, Uruguay	Uruguay	–	3–2	Friendly	
2	18 July 1975	Estadio Centenario, Montevideo, Uruguay	Uruguay	–	3–2	Friendly	
3	16 June 1985	Estadio Monumental, Buenos Aires, Argentina	Colombia	1–0	1–0	1986 FIFA World Cup qualification	
4	2 June 1986	Estadio Olímpico Universitario, Mexico City, Mexico	South Korea	1–0	3–1	1986 FIFA World Cup	
5	2 June 1986	Estadio Olímpico Universitario, Mexico City, Mexico	South Korea	3–0	3–1	1986 FIFA World Cup	
6	10 June 1986	Estadio Olímpico Universitario, Mexico City, Mexico	Bulgaria	1–0	2–0	1986 FIFA World Cup	
7	29 June 1986	Estadio Azteca, Mexico City, Mexico	West Germany	2–0	3–2	1986 FIFA World Cup	

== Managerial statistics ==
Managerial record by team and tenure
Team	From	To	Record					Ref.
Team	From	To	P	W	D	L	Win %	Ref.
Tenerife	13 April 1992	30 June 1994	96	40	26	30	41.7	
Real Madrid	1 July 1994	22 January 1996	78	39	17	22	50.0	
Valencia	25 November 1996	15 September 1997	36	11	11	14	30.6	
Total			210	90	54	66	42.9	

== Honours ==
=== Player ===
Newell's Old Boys

- Argentine Primera División: 1974

Real Madrid

- La Liga: 1985–86, 1986–87
- Copa de la Liga: 1985
- UEFA Cup: 1984–85, 1985–86

Argentina Youth

- Toulon Tournament: 1975

Argentina

- FIFA World Cup: 1986

==== Individual ====
Awards

- Copa del Rey Top Scorer: 1981–82
- La Liga Foreign Player of the Year: 1985–86

=== Manager ===
Real Madrid

- La Liga: 1994–95
