= Raúl Servín =

Mexican footballer (born 1963)

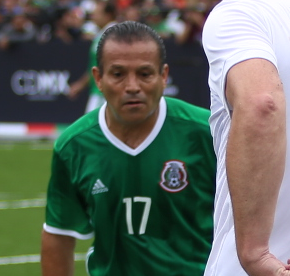
- Servín in 2017

Personal information
- Full name: Raúl Servín Monetti
- Date of birth: 29 April 1963 (age 63)
- Place of birth: Mexico City, Mexico
- Height: 1.69 m (5 ft 6 1/2 in)
- Position: Defender

Senior career*
Years	Team	Apps	(Gls)
1983–1989	Pumas	144	(8)
1989–1990	Morelia	38	(1)
1990–1991	Cruz Azul	36	(0)
1991–1992	Atlas	0	(0)
1992–1993	Cruz Azul	2	(0)
1993–1994	Toros Neza	5	(0)
Total		225	(9)

International career
1985–1990	Mexico	32	(4)
- * Club domestic league appearances and goals

Raúl Servín Monetti (born 29 April 1963) is a Mexican former professional footballer, who played as a defender for Pumas and the Mexico national team. He played in the 1986 FIFA World Cup in Mexico, where he scored a goal in the second round match against Bulgaria.

== Career ==
Servín began playing professional football with Pumas, making his Primera debut against Atlético Español during the 1980–81 season. In his 14-year playing career, he also appeared for Monarcas Morelia, Cruz Azul and Toros Neza.

== Personal ==
Servín's son, Raúl Servín Molina, is also a Pumas footballer who made his Primera debut against Monterrey on 3 August 2011.
