= Julio Olarticoechea =

Argentine footballer

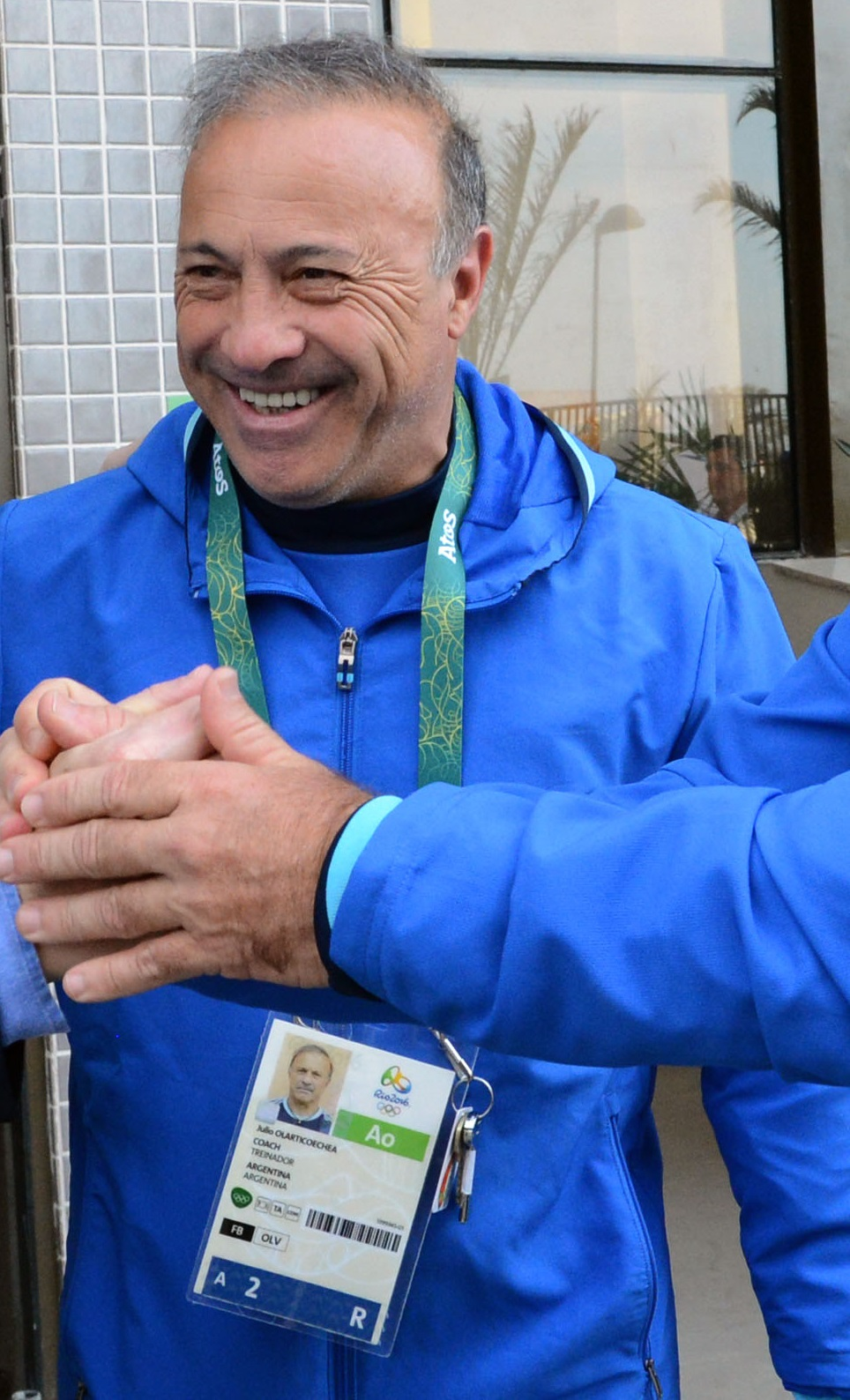
- Olarticoechea during the 2016 Summer Olympics

Personal information
- Full name: Julio Jorge Olarticoechea
- Date of birth: 18 October 1958 (age 68)
- Place of birth: Saladillo, Buenos Aires, Argentina
- Height: 1.70 m (5 ft 7 in)
- Position: Defender

Senior career*
Years	Team	Apps	(Gls)
1975–1981	Racing Club	230	(13)
1981–1984	River Plate	106	(3)
1985–1986	Boca Juniors	44	(4)
1987	Nantes	27	(3)
1987–1988	Argentinos Juniors	25	(2)
1988–1990	Racing Club	(see above)	
1990–1992	Deportivo Mandiyú	61	(4)

International career
1982–1990	Argentina	32	(0)

Managerial career
- 2015: Argentina (women)
Medal record
Men's football
Representing Argentina
FIFA World Cup
Winner	1986 Mexico
Runner-up	1990 Italy
- * Club domestic league appearances and goals

Julio Jorge Olarticoechea (born 18 October 1958) is an Argentine former footballer who played as a defender. At international level, he represented Argentina at the 1986 and the 1990 World Cups, winning the former edition of the tournament. Olarticoechea and Diego Maradona were roommates in Mexico at the 1986 World Cup.

== Career ==
Olarticoechea played for Argentinos Juniors, Deportivo Mandiyú, River Plate, Boca Juniors and Racing Club in the Argentinian League as well as for FC Nantes in the French League. He was manager in Talleres de Remedios de Escalada, Argentina.

== Career statistics ==
=== International ===
Argentina national team
Year	Apps	Goals
1983	3	0
1984	0	0
1985	0	0
1986	9	0
1987	5	0
1988	2	0
1989	1	0
1990	8	0
Total	25	0

== Honours ==
=== Club ===
River Plate

- Argentine Primera División: Nacional 1981

Racing

- Supercopa Sudamericana: 1988
- Recopa Sudamericana runner-up: 1989

=== International ===
Argentina

- FIFA World Cup: 1986; runner-up:1990

Olarticoechea's home town of Saladillo, Buenos Aires, installed a roadside monument honoring his football career.
