= José Luis Cuciuffo =

Argentine footballer

- Cuciuffo at the 1986 FIFA World Cup

Personal information
- Full name: José Luis Cuciuffo
- Date of birth: 1 February 1961
- Place of birth: Córdoba, Argentina
- Date of death: 11 December 2004 (aged 43)
- Place of death: Bahía San Blas, Argentina
- Height: 1.76 m (5 ft 9 in)
- Position: Centre-back

Senior career*
Years	Team	Apps	(Gls)
1978–1980	Huracán de Córdoba		
1980	Chaco for Ever	10	(0)
1981	Talleres	43	(1)
1982–1987	Vélez Sársfield	185	(8)
1987–1990	Boca Juniors	102	(4)
1990–1993	Nîmes Olympique	94	(8)
1993	Belgrano	14	(1)

International career
1985–1989	Argentina	21	(0)
Medal record
Representing Argentina
Men's football
FIFA World Cup
Winner	1986 Mexico
- * Club domestic league appearances and goals

José Luis Cuciuffo (1 February 1961 – 11 December 2004) was an Argentine professional footballer who played as a centre back and who was part of the 1986 FIFA World Cup-winning Argentina national team.

== Club career ==
Of Sicilian origin, Cuciuffo started his professional career at Chaco For Ever, and later played for Talleres de Córdoba, Vélez Sársfield, Boca Juniors and Belgrano de Córdoba. He also played in the French league with Nîmes Olympique.

== Death ==
Cuciuffo suffered a fatal gunshot wound in the stomach while out hunting in the southern Buenos Aires province, near San Blas Bay. He died in hospital. He was the first world champion football player for Argentina to die and youngest (i.e. latest born) overall, succeeding Italy's Gaetano Scirea.

== Honours ==
Vélez Sársfield

- Primera División runner-up: 1985

Boca Juniors

- Supercopa Sudamericana: 1989
- Recopa Sudamericana: 1990

Argentina

- FIFA World Cup: 1986

=== Individual ===
- South American Team of the Year: 1986
