= Cameroon at the FIFA World Cup =

International football delegation

The FIFA World Cup is an international association football competition contested by the men's national teams of the members of Fédération Internationale de Football Association (FIFA), the sport's global governing body. The championship has been awarded every four years since the first tournament in 1930, except in 1942 and 1946, due to World War II.

The tournament consists of two parts, the qualification phase and the final phase (officially called the World Cup Finals). The qualification phase, which currently take place over the three years preceding the Finals, is used to determine which teams qualify for the Finals. The current format of the Finals involves 48 teams competing for the title, at venues within the host nation (or nations) over a period of about a month. The World Cup final is the most widely viewed sporting event in the world, with an estimated 715.1 million people watching the 2006 tournament final.

Cameroon have appeared in the Finals of the FIFA World Cup on eight occasions, the first being in 1982, where they drew all three group games and finished in 17th place. In 1990, Cameroon reached the quarter-finals before being defeated 3–2 by England. Roger Milla, at the age of 42, became the oldest player ever to appear in a World Cup Finals match at the 1994 FIFA World Cup, where he also managed to score. The record for oldest player was broken in 2014 by Colombian goalkeeper Faryd Mondragón, but Milla is still the oldest goalscorer at FIFA World Cup Finals.

Cameroon made their most recent tournament appearance at the 2022 FIFA World Cup in Qatar.

== Record at the FIFA World Cup ==
FIFA World Cup record
Year	Round	Position	Pld	W	D*	L	GF	GA
(Uruguay) 1930	Part of France							
(Italy) 1934	Part of France							
(France) 1938	Part of France							
(Brazil) 1950	Part of France							
(Switzerland) 1954	Part of France							
(Sweden) 1958	Part of France							
as Cameroon
(Chile) 1962	Not a FIFA member							
(England) 1966	Withdrew							
(Mexico) 1970	Did not qualify							
(West Germany) 1974	Did not qualify							
(Argentina) 1978	Did not qualify							
(Spain) 1982	Group stage	17th	3	0	3	0	1	1
(Mexico) 1986	Did not qualify							
(Italy) 1990	Quarter-finals	7th	5	3	0	2	7	9
(United States) 1994	Group stage	22nd	3	0	1	2	3	11
(France) 1998	Group stage	25th	3	0	2	1	2	5
(South Korea) (Japan) 2002	Group stage	20th	3	1	1	1	2	3
(Germany) 2006	Did not qualify							
(South Africa) 2010	Group stage	31st	3	0	0	3	2	5
(Brazil) 2014	Group stage	32nd	3	0	0	3	1	9
(Russia) 2018	Did not qualify							
(Qatar) 2022	Group stage	19th	3	1	1	1	4	4
(Canada) (Mexico) (United States) 2026	Did not qualify							
(Morocco) (Portugal) (Spain) 2030	To be determined							
(Saudi Arabia) 2034	To be determined							
Total	Quarter-finals	8/23	26	5	8	13	22	47

*Denotes draws including knockout matches decided via penalty shoot-out.

=== By match ===
Year	Round	Opponent	Score	Result	Venue	Cameroon scorers
1982	Group 1	Peru	0–0	D	A Coruña	—
1982	Group 1	Poland	0–0	D	A Coruña	—
1982	Group 1	Italy	1–1	D	Vigo	G. M'Bida
1990	Group B	Argentina	1–0	W	Milan	F. Omam-Biyik
1990	Group B	Romania	2–1	W	Bari	R. Milla (2)
1990	Group B	Soviet Union	0–4	L	Bari	—
1990	Round of 16	Colombia	2–1 (a.e.t.)	W	Naples	R. Milla (2)
1990	Quarter-finals	England	2–3 (a.e.t.)	L	Naples	E. Kundé, E. Ekéké
1994	Group B	Sweden	2–2	D	Pasadena	D. Embé, F. Omam-Biyik
1994	Group B	Brazil	0–3	L	Stanford	—
1994	Group B	Russia	1–6	L	Stanford	R. Milla
1998	Group B	Austria	1–1	D	Toulouse	P. Njanka
1998	Group B	Italy	0–3	L	Montpellier	—
1998	Group B	Chile	1–1	D	Nantes	P. M'Boma
2002	Group E	Republic of Ireland	1–1	D	Niigata	P. M'Boma
2002	Group E	Saudi Arabia	1–0	W	Saitama	S. Eto'o
2002	Group E	Germany	0–2	L	Shizuoka	—
2010	Group E	Japan	0–1	L	Bloemfontein	—
2010	Group E	Denmark	1–2	L	Pretoria	S. Eto'o
2010	Group E	Netherlands	1–2	L	Cape Town	S. Eto'o
2014	Group A	Mexico	0–1	L	Natal	—
2014	Group A	Croatia	0–4	L	Manaus	—
2014	Group A	Brazil	1–4	L	Brasília	J. Matip
2022	Group G	Switzerland	0–1	L	Al Wakrah	—
2022	Group G	Serbia	3–3	D	Al Wakrah	J. Castelletto, V. Aboubakar, E. Choupo-Moting
2022	Group G	Brazil	1–0	W	Lusail	V. Aboubakar

=== Record by opponent ===
FIFA World Cup matches (by team)
Opponent	Wins	Draws	Losses	Total	Goals scored	Goals conceded
Argentina	1	0	0	1	1	0
Austria	0	1	0	1	1	1
Brazil	1	0	2	3	2	7
Chile	0	1	0	1	1	1
Colombia	1	0	0	1	2	1
Croatia	0	0	1	1	0	4
Denmark	0	0	1	1	1	2
England	0	0	1	1	2	3
Germany	0	0	1	1	0	2
Italy	0	1	1	2	1	4
Japan	0	0	1	1	0	1
Mexico	0	0	1	1	0	1
Netherlands	0	0	1	1	1	2
Peru	0	1	0	1	0	0
Poland	0	1	0	1	0	0
Republic of Ireland	0	1	0	1	1	1
Romania	1	0	0	1	2	1
Russia	0	0	1	1	1	6
Saudi Arabia	1	0	0	1	1	0
Serbia	0	1	0	1	3	3
Soviet Union	0	0	1	1	0	4
Sweden	0	1	0	1	2	2
Switzerland	0	0	1	1	0	1

== Participations ==
=== Squad ===
Head coach: (France) Jean Vincent

No.	Pos.	Player	Date of birth (age)	Caps	Club
1	GK	Thomas N'Kono (c)	20 July 1956 (aged 25)		(Cameroon) Canon Yaoundé
2	DF	Michel Kaham	1 June 1952 (aged 30)		(France) Stade Quimperois
3	DF	Edmond Enoka	17 December 1955 (aged 26)		(Cameroon) Dragon Douala
4	DF	René N'Djeya	9 October 1953 (aged 28)		(Cameroon) Union Douala
5	DF	Elie Onana	13 October 1958 (aged 23)		(Cameroon) Federal Foumban
6	MF	Emmanuel Kundé	15 July 1956 (aged 25)		(Cameroon) Canon Yaoundé
7	MF	Ephrem M'Bom	19 October 1955 (aged 26)		(Cameroon) Canon Yaoundé
8	MF	Grégoire M'Bida	27 January 1955 (aged 27)		(Cameroon) Canon Yaoundé
9	FW	Roger Milla	20 May 1952 (aged 30)		(France) Bastia
10	FW	Jean-Pierre Tokoto	26 January 1948 (aged 34)		(United States) Jacksonville Tea Men
11	MF	Charles Toubé	22 January 1958 (aged 24)		(Cameroon) Tonnerre Yaoundé
12	GK	Joseph-Antoine Bell	8 October 1954 (aged 27)		(Ivory Coast) Africa Sports
13	FW	Paul Bahoken	7 July 1955 (aged 26)		(France) Cannes
14	MF	Théophile Abega	9 July 1954 (aged 27)		(Cameroon) Canon Yaoundé
15	DF	François N'Doumbé	30 January 1954 (aged 28)		(Cameroon) Union Douala
16	DF	Ibrahim Aoudou	23 August 1955 (aged 26)		(France) Cannes
17	MF	Joseph Kamga	17 August 1953 (aged 28)		(Cameroon) Union Douala
18	FW	Jacques N'Guea	8 November 1955 (aged 26)		(Cameroon) Canon Yaoundé
19	MF	Joseph Enanga	18 November 1956 (aged 25)		(Cameroon) Union Douala
20	FW	Oscar Eyobo	23 October 1961 (aged 20)		(Cameroon) Dynamo Douala
21	FW	Ernest Ebongué	15 May 1962 (aged 20)		(Cameroon) Tonnerre Yaoundé
22	GK	Simon Tchobang	31 August 1951 (aged 30)		(Cameroon) Dynamo Douala

=== Matches ===
15 June 1982
17:15 CEST

Peru	0–0	Cameroon
	Report

Estadio de Riazor, A Coruña
Attendance: 11,000
Referee: Franz Wöhrer (Austria)

19 June 1982
17:15 CEST

Poland	0–0	Cameroon
	Report

Estadio de Riazor, A Coruña
Attendance: 19,000
Referee: Alexis Ponnet (Belgium)

Grégoire M'Bida scored the first ever goal for Cameroon in the World Cup Finals when he hooked the ball home with his right foot past the advancing goalkeeper from inside the six yard box after the ball had been headed on to him from a high ball inside the penalty area. The goal came one minute after Italy had taken the lead in the game after missing several chances to score in the first half.

23 June 1982
17:15 CEST

Italy	1–1	Cameroon
Graziani 60'	Report	M'Bida 61'

Balaídos, Vigo
Attendance: 20,000
Referee: Bogdan Dotchev (Bulgaria)

=== Squad ===
Head coach: (Soviet Union) Valery Nepomnyashchy

No.	Pos.	Player	Date of birth (age)	Caps	Club
1	GK	Joseph-Antoine Bell	8 October 1954 (aged 35)		(France) Bordeaux
2	DF	André Kana-Biyik	1 September 1965 (aged 24)		(France) Metz
3	DF	Jules Onana	12 June 1964 (aged 25)		(Cameroon) Canon Yaoundé
4	DF	Benjamin Massing	20 June 1962 (aged 27)		(France) Créteil
5	DF	Bertin Ebwellé	11 September 1962 (aged 27)		(Cameroon) Tonnerre Yaoundé
6	MF	Emmanuel Kundé	15 July 1956 (aged 33)		(Cameroon) Prévoyance Yaoundé
7	FW	François Omam-Biyik	21 May 1966 (aged 24)		(France) Stade Lavallois
8	MF	Émile Mbouh	30 May 1966 (aged 24)		(France) Le Havre
9	FW	Roger Milla	20 May 1952 (aged 38)		(France) JS Saint-Pierroise
10	FW	Louis-Paul M'Fédé	26 February 1962 (aged 28)		(Cameroon) Canon Yaoundé
11	FW	Eugène Ekéké	30 May 1960 (aged 30)		(France) Valenciennes
12	DF	Alphonse Yombi	30 June 1969 (aged 20)		(Cameroon) Canon Yaoundé
13	MF	Jean-Claude Pagal	15 September 1964 (aged 25)		(France) La Roche Vendée
14	DF	Stephen Tataw (c)	31 March 1963 (aged 27)		(Cameroon) Tonnerre Yaoundé
15	MF	Thomas Libiih	17 November 1967 (aged 22)		(Cameroon) Tonnerre Yaoundé
16	GK	Thomas N'Kono	20 July 1956 (aged 33)		(Spain) Espanyol
17	DF	Victor N'Dip	20 August 1967 (aged 22)		(Cameroon) Canon Yaoundé
18	FW	Bonaventure Djonkep	20 August 1961 (aged 28)		(Cameroon) Union Douala
19	MF	Roger Feutmba	31 October 1968 (aged 21)		(Cameroon) Union Douala
20	MF	Cyrille Makanaky	28 June 1965 (aged 24)		(France) Toulon
21	MF	Emmanuel Maboang	27 November 1968 (aged 21)		(Cameroon) Canon Yaoundé
22	GK	Jacques Songo'o	17 March 1964 (aged 26)		(France) Toulon

=== Argentina vs Cameroon ===
Omam-Biyik scored with a downward header from six yards out the after the ball had been looped into the air. Nery Pumpido allowed the weak header to go under his body and into the net.

8 June 1990
18:00

Argentina	0–1	Cameroon
	Report	Omam-Biyik 67'

San Siro, Milan
Attendance: 73,780
Referee: Michel Vautrot (France)

Argentina	Cameroon

GK	1	Nery Pumpido
DF	19	Oscar Ruggeri		(substituted off) 46'
DF	20	Juan Simón
DF	11	Néstor Fabbri
MF	4	José Basualdo
MF	13	Néstor Lorenzo
MF	2	Sergio Batista
MF	17	Roberto Sensini	(yellow card) 27'	(substituted off) 69'
MF	7	Jorge Burruchaga
FW	3	Abel Balbo
FW	10	Diego Maradona (c)
Substitutions:
GK	12	Sergio Goycochea
DF	18	José Serrizuela
MF	16	Julio Olarticoechea
MF	6	Gabriel Calderón		(substituted on) 69'
FW	8	Claudio Caniggia		(substituted on) 46'
Manager:
(Argentina) Carlos Bilardo

GK	16	Thomas N'Kono (c)
SW	17	Victor N'Dip	(yellow card) 23'
DF	14	Stephen Tataw
DF	6	Emmanuel Kundé
DF	4	Benjamin Massing	(yellow card) 10' (yellow-red card) 89'
DF	5	Bertin Ebwellé
MF	8	Émile Mbouh	(yellow card) 54'
MF	2	André Kana-Biyik	(red card) 61'
MF	10	Louis-Paul Mfédé		(substituted off) 66'
FW	7	François Omam-Biyik
FW	20	Cyril Makanaky		(substituted off) 81'
Substitutions:
GK	22	Jacques Songo'o
DF	15	Thomas Libiih		(substituted on) 66'
MF	13	Jean-Claude Pagal
MF	21	Emmanuel Maboang
FW	9	Roger Milla		(substituted on) 81'
Manager:
(Soviet Union) Valery Nepomnyashchy

Assistant referees:
Vincent Mauro (United States)
Michał Listkiewicz (Poland)

=== Cameroon vs Romania ===
14 June 1990
17:00

Cameroon	2–1	Romania
Milla 76', 86'	Report	Balint 88'

Stadio San Nicola, Bari
Attendance: 38,687
Referee: Hernán Silva (Chile)

Cameroon	Romania

GK	16	Thomas N'Kono	(yellow card) 68'
SW	17	Victor N'Dip
DF	14	Stephen Tataw (c)
DF	6	Emmanuel Kundé		(substituted off) 68'
DF	3	Jules Onana	(yellow card) 20'
DF	5	Bertin Ebwellé
MF	8	Émile Mbouh
MF	21	Emmanuel Maboang		(substituted off) 58'
MF	10	Louis-Paul Mfédé
FW	7	François Omam-Biyik
FW	20	Cyril Makanaky
Substitutions:
FW	9	Roger Milla		(substituted on) 58'
DF	13	Jean-Claude Pagal		(substituted on) 68'
Manager:
(Soviet Union) Valery Nepomnyashchy

GK	1	Silviu Lung (c)
DF	2	Mircea Rednic
DF	4	Ioan Andone
DF	6	Gheorghe Popescu
DF	3	Michael Klein	(yellow card) 44'
MF	8	Ioan Sabău
MF	5	Iosif Rotariu
MF	10	Gheorghe Hagi		(substituted off) 55'
MF	16	Daniel Timofte
FW	7	Marius Lăcătuș
FW	14	Florin Răducioiu		(substituted off) 63'
Substitutions:
FW	17	Ilie Dumitrescu		(substituted on) 55'
FW	18	Gavril Balint		(substituted on) 63'
Manager:
(Romania) Emerich Jenei

Assistant referees:
Carlos Silva Valente (Portugal)
Armando Pérez-Hoyos (Colombia)

=== Cameroon vs Soviet Union ===
18 June 1990
21:00

Cameroon	0–4	Soviet Union
	Report	Protasov 20'; Zygmantovich 29'; Zavarov 55'; Dobrovolski 63'

Stadio San Nicola, Bari
Attendance: 37,307
Referee: José Roberto Wright (Brazil)

Cameroon	Soviet Union

GK	16	Thomas N'Kono
SW	17	Victor N'Dip
DF	14	Stephen Tataw (c)
DF	6	Emmanuel Kundé		(substituted off) 34'
DF	3	Jules Onana
DF	5	Bertin Ebwellé
MF	8	Émile Mbouh
MF	2	André Kana-Biyik	(yellow card) 61'
MF	10	Louis-Paul Mfédé
FW	7	François Omam-Biyik
FW	20	Cyril Makanaky		(substituted off) 56'
Substitutions:
FW	9	Roger Milla	(yellow card) 66'	(substituted on) 34'
DF	13	Jean-Claude Pagal		(substituted on) 56'
Manager:
(Soviet Union) Valery Nepomnyashchy

GK	22	Aleksandr Uvarov
DF	5	Anatoliy Demyanenko (c)
DF	3	Vagiz Khidiyatullin
DF	4	Oleh Kuznetsov
DF	20	Sergei Gorlukovich
MF	7	Sergei Aleinikov
MF	17	Andrei Zygmantovich
MF	18	Igor Shalimov		(substituted off) 46'
MF	10	Oleh Protasov	(yellow card) 75'
FW	8	Hennadiy Lytovchenko		(substituted off) 72'
FW	11	Igor Dobrovolski
Substitutions:
DF	6	Vasyl Rats
MF	9	Aleksandr Zavarov		(substituted on) 46'
MF	15	Ivan Yaremchuk		(substituted on) 72'
GK	16	Viktor Chanov
MF	21	Valeri Broshin
Manager:
(Soviet Union) Valeriy Lobanovskyi

Assistant referees:
Kurt Röthlisberger (Switzerland)
Pietro d'Elia (Italy)

=== Cameroon vs Colombia ===
23 June 1990
17:00

Cameroon	2–1 (a.e.t.)	Colombia
Milla 106', 109'	Report	Redín 115'

Stadio San Paolo, Naples
Attendance: 50,026
Referee: Tullio Lanese (Italy)

Cameroon	Colombia

GK	16	Thomas N'Kono
SW	17	Victor N'Dip	(yellow card) 47'
DF	14	Stephen Tataw (c)
DF	3	Jules Onana	(yellow card) 117'
DF	5	Bertin Ebwellé
MF	8	Émile Mbouh	(yellow card) 68'
MF	2	André Kana-Biyik	(yellow card) 44'
MF	21	Emmanuel Maboang
MF	10	Louis-Paul Mfédé		(substituted off) 54'
FW	7	François Omam-Biyik
FW	20	Cyril Makanaky		(substituted off) 69'
Substitutes:
DF	4	Benjamin Massing
DF	6	Emmanuel Kundé
FW	9	Roger Milla		(substituted on) 54'
FW	18	Bonaventure Djonkep		(substituted on) 69'
GK	22	Jacques Songo'o
Manager:
(Soviet Union) Valery Nepomnyashchy

GK	1	René Higuita
DF	4	Luis Herrera
DF	15	Luis Perea	(yellow card) 72'
DF	2	Andrés Escobar
DF	3	Gildardo Gómez
MF	8	Gabriel Gómez	(yellow card) 74'	(substituted off) 79'
MF	14	Leonel Álvarez
MF	20	Luis Fajardo		(substituted off) 63'
MF	10	Carlos Valderrama (c)
FW	19	Freddy Rincón
FW	7	Carlos Estrada
Substitutes:
FW	9	Miguel Guerrero
MF	11	Bernardo Redín		(substituted on) 79'
GK	12	Eduardo Niño
FW	16	Arnoldo Iguarán		(substituted on) 63'
DF	21	Alexis Mendoza
Manager:
Francisco Maturana

Assistant referees:
Jamal Al Sharif (Syria)
Berny Ulloa Morera (Costa Rica)

=== England vs Cameroon ===
1 July 1990
21:00

England	3–2 (a.e.t.)	Cameroon
Platt 25'; Lineker 83' (pen.), 105' (pen.)	Report	Kundé 61' (pen.); Ekéké 65'

Stadio San Paolo, Naples
Attendance: 55,205
Referee: Edgardo Codesal (Mexico)

England	Cameroon

GK	1	Peter Shilton
SW	14	Mark Wright
RB	12	Paul Parker
CB	5	Des Walker
CB	6	Terry Butcher (c)		(substituted off) 73'
LB	3	Stuart Pearce	(yellow card) 70'
RW	8	Chris Waddle
CM	17	David Platt
CM	19	Paul Gascoigne
LW	11	John Barnes		(substituted off) 46'
FW	10	Gary Lineker
Substitutes:
FW	9	Peter Beardsley		(substituted on) 46'
GK	13	Chris Woods
MF	16	Steve McMahon
MF	20	Trevor Steven		(substituted on) 73'
FW	21	Steve Bull
Manager:
Bobby Robson

GK	16	Thomas N'Kono	(yellow card) 104'
SW	6	Emmanuel Kundé
DF	14	Stephen Tataw (c)
DF	4	Benjamin Massing	(yellow card) 28'
DF	5	Bertin Ebwellé
MF	15	Thomas Libiih
MF	21	Emmanuel Maboang		(substituted off) 46'
MF	13	Jean-Claude Pagal
MF	10	Louis-Paul Mfédé		(substituted off) 62'
FW	7	François Omam-Biyik
FW	20	Cyril Makanaky
Substitutes:
FW	9	Roger Milla	(yellow card) 104'	(substituted on) 46'
FW	11	Eugène Ekéké		(substituted on) 62'
DF	12	Alphonse Yombi
MF	19	Roger Feutmba
GK	22	Jacques Songo'o
Manager:
(Soviet Union) Valery Nepomnyashchy

Assistant referees:
Vincent Mauro (United States)
Jassim Mandi (Bahrain)

=== Squad ===
Head coach: (France) Henri Michel

No.	Pos.	Player	Date of birth (age)	Caps	Club
1	GK	Joseph-Antoine Bell	8 October 1954 (aged 39)		(France) Saint-Étienne
2	DF	André Kana-Biyik	1 September 1965 (aged 28)		(France) Le Havre
3	DF	Rigobert Song	1 July 1976 (aged 17)		(Cameroon) Tonnerre Yaounde
4	DF	Samuel Ekeme	12 July 1966 (aged 27)		(Cameroon) Canon Yaounde
5	DF	Victor N'Dip	18 August 1967 (aged 26)		(Cameroon) Olympic Mvolyé
6	MF	Thomas Libiih	17 November 1967 (aged 26)		(Saudi Arabia) Ohud
7	FW	François Omam-Biyik	21 May 1966 (aged 28)		(France) Lens
8	MF	Émile Mbouh	30 May 1966 (aged 28)		Nadi Qatar
9	FW	Roger Milla	20 May 1952 (aged 42)		(Cameroon) Tonnerre Yaounde
10	FW	Louis-Paul M'Fédé	26 February 1961 (aged 33)		(Cameroon) Canon Yaounde
11	MF	Emmanuel Maboang	27 November 1968 (aged 25)		(Portugal) Rio Ave
12	MF	Paul Loga	14 August 1969 (aged 24)		(Cameroon) Prevoyance Yaounde
13	DF	Raymond Kalla	22 April 1975 (aged 19)		(Cameroon) Canon Yaounde
14	DF	Stephen Tataw (c)	31 March 1963 (aged 31)		(Cameroon) Olympic Mvolyé
15	DF	Hans Agbo	26 September 1967 (aged 26)		(Cameroon) Olympic Mvolyé
16	FW	Alphonse Tchami	14 September 1971 (aged 22)		(Denmark) Odense
17	MF	Marc-Vivien Foé	1 May 1975 (aged 19)		(Cameroon) Canon Yaounde
18	MF	Jean-Pierre Fiala	22 April 1969 (aged 25)		(Cameroon) Canon Yaounde
19	FW	David Embé	13 November 1973 (aged 20)		(Portugal) Belenenses
20	FW	Georges Mouyémé	15 April 1971 (aged 23)		(France) Troyes
21	GK	Thomas N'Kono	20 July 1956 (aged 37)		(Spain) CE L'Hospitalet
22	GK	Jacques Songo'o	17 March 1964 (aged 30)		(France) Metz

=== Matches ===
Embé got the equalizing goal for Cameroon in the 31st minute when he side-footed into an empty net from close range after a pass from the left. Omam-Biyik then scored to put Cameroon in front in the 47th minute when he ran onto a long ball into the box before flicking the ball right footed past the advancing goalkeeper from eight yards out.

19 June 1994
16:30 PDT

Cameroon	2–2	Sweden
Embé 31'; Omam-Biyik 47'	Report	Ljung 8'; Dahlin 75'

Rose Bowl, Pasadena
Attendance: 93,194
Referee: Alberto Tejada Noriega (Peru)

Cameroon	Sweden

GK	1	Joseph-Antoine Bell
DF	3	Rigobert Song
MF	6	Thomas Libiih
FW	7	François Omam-Biyik
MF	8	Emile Mbouh	(yellow card) 5'
FW	10	Louis-Paul Mfédé		(substituted off) 88'
DF	13	Raymond Kalla
DF	14	Stephen Tataw (c)
DF	15	Hans Agbo
MF	17	Marc-Vivien Foé
FW	19	David Embé		(substituted off) 81'
Substitutions:
MF	11	Emmanuel Maboang		(substituted on) 88'
FW	20	Georges Mouyémé		(substituted on) 81'
Manager:
(France) Henri Michel

GK	1	Thomas Ravelli
DF	2	Roland Nilsson
DF	3	Patrik Andersson
DF	4	Joachim Björklund
DF	5	Roger Ljung
MF	6	Stefan Schwarz
MF	8	Klas Ingesson		(substituted off) 76'
MF	9	Jonas Thern(c)
FW	10	Martin Dahlin	(yellow card) 72'
FW	11	Tomas Brolin
MF	21	Jesper Blomqvist		(substituted off) 61'
Substitutions:
FW	7	Henrik Larsson		(substituted on) 61'
FW	19	Kennet Andersson		(substituted on) 76'
Manager:
Tommy Svensson

Assistant referees:
Douglas James (Trinidad and Tobago)
Abdulla Al Ghattan (Bahrain)
Fourth official:
Jamal Al Sharif (Syria)

24 June 1994
13:00 PDT

Brazil	3–0	Cameroon
Romário 39'; Santos 66'; Bebeto 73'	Report

Stanford Stadium, Palo Alto
Attendance: 83,401
Referee: Arturo Brizio Carter (Mexico)

Brazil	Cameroon

GK	1	Cláudio Taffarel
DF	2	Jorginho
DF	13	Aldair
DF	15	Márcio Santos
DM	5	Mauro Silva	(yellow card) 44'
DM	8	Dunga
MF	10	Raí (c)		(substituted off) 81'
MF	16	Leonardo
RW	9	Zinho		(substituted off) 75'
LW	7	Bebeto
FW	11	Romário
Substitutions:
MF	18	Paulo Sérgio		(substituted on) 75'
FW	19	Müller		(substituted on) 81'
Manager:
Carlos Alberto Parreira

GK	1	Joseph-Antoine Bell
DF	3	Rigobert Song	(red card) 63'
MF	6	Thomas Libiih
FW	7	François Omam-Biyik
MF	8	Emile Mbouh
FW	10	Louis-Paul Mfédé		(substituted off) 71'
DF	13	Raymond Kalla	(yellow card) 37'
DF	14	Stephen Tataw(c)	(yellow card) 8'
DF	15	Hans Agbo
MF	17	Marc-Vivien Foé
FW	19	David Embé		(substituted off) 64'
Substitutions:
FW	9	Roger Milla		(substituted on) 64'
MF	11	Emmanuel Maboang		(substituted on) 71'
Manager:
(France) Henri Michel

Assistant referees:
Douglas James (Trinidad and Tobago)
Carl-Johan Meyer Christensen (Denmark)
Fourth official:
Peter Mikkelsen (Denmark)

28 June 1994
13:00 PDT

Russia	6–1	Cameroon
Salenko 15', 41', 44' (pen.), 72', 75'; Radchenko 81'	Report	Milla 46'

Stanford Stadium, Palo Alto
Attendance: 74,914
Referee: Jamal Al Sharif (Syria)

Russia	Cameroon

GK	1	Stanislav Cherchesov
DF	5	Yuriy Nikiforov	(yellow card) 90'
DF	6	Vladislav Ternavsky
FW	9	Oleg Salenko
MF	10	Valeri Karpin	(yellow card) 57'
DF	12	Omari Tetradze
FW	14	Igor Korneev		(substituted off) 65'
MF	17	Ilya Tsymbalar
DF	18	Viktor Onopko(c)
MF	20	Igor Lediakhov		(substituted off) 78'
DF	21	Dmitri Khlestov	(yellow card) 87'
Substitutions:
FW	11	Vladimir Beschastnykh		(substituted on) 78'
FW	15	Dmitri Radchenko		(substituted on) 65'
Manager:
Pavel Sadyrin

GK	22	Jacques Songo'o	(yellow card) 44'
MF	2	André Kana-Biyik	(yellow card) 12'
DF	5	Victor Ndip
MF	6	Thomas Libiih
FW	7	François Omam-Biyik
FW	10	Louis-Paul Mfédé		(substituted off) 45'
DF	13	Raymond Kalla
DF	14	Stephen Tataw(c)
DF	15	Hans Agbo
MF	17	Marc-Vivien Foé
FW	19	David Embé		(substituted off) 47'
Substitutions:
FW	9	Roger Milla		(substituted on) 45'
FW	16	Alphonse Tchami		(substituted on) 47'
Manager:
(France) Henri Michel

Assistant referees:
Gordon Dunster (Australia)
Jan Dolstra (Netherlands)
Fourth official:
Mario van der Ende (Netherlands)

=== Squad ===
Head coach: (France) Claude Le Roy

No.	Pos.	Player	Date of birth (age)	Caps	Club
1	GK	Jacques Songo'o	17 March 1964 (aged 34)		(Spain) Deportivo La Coruña
2	MF	Joseph Elanga	2 May 1979 (aged 19)		(Cameroon) Tonnerre Yaoundé
3	DF	Pierre Womé	26 March 1979 (aged 19)		(Italy) Lucchese
4	DF	Rigobert Song	1 July 1976 (aged 21)		(France) Metz
5	DF	Raymond Kalla	22 April 1975 (aged 23)		(Greece) Panahaiki
6	DF	Pierre Njanka	15 March 1975 (aged 23)		(Cameroon) Olympic Mvolyé
7	FW	François Omam-Biyik (c)	21 May 1966 (aged 32)		(Italy) Sampdoria
8	MF	Didier Angibeaud	8 October 1974 (aged 23)		(France) Nice
9	FW	Alphonse Tchami	14 February 1971 (aged 27)		(Germany) Hertha BSC
10	FW	Patrick M'Boma	15 November 1970 (aged 27)		(Japan) Gamba Osaka
11	FW	Samuel Eto'o	10 March 1981 (aged 17)		(Spain) Leganés
12	DF	Lauren	19 January 1977 (aged 21)		(Spain) Levante
13	DF	Patrice Abanda	3 August 1978 (aged 19)		(Cameroon) Tonnerre Yaoundé
14	MF	Augustine Simo	18 September 1978 (aged 19)		(France) Saint-Étienne
15	MF	Joseph N'Do	28 April 1976 (aged 22)		(Cameroon) Cottonsport Garoua
16	GK	Bassey William Andem	14 June 1968 (aged 29)		(Portugal) Boavista
17	DF	Michel Pensée	16 June 1973 (aged 24)		(South Korea) Cheonan Ilhwa Chunma
18	FW	Samuel Ipoua	1 March 1973 (aged 25)		(Austria) Rapid Wien
19	MF	Marcel Mahouvé	16 January 1973 (aged 25)		(France) Montpellier
20	MF	Salomon Olembé	8 December 1980 (aged 17)		(France) Nantes
21	FW	Joseph-Désiré Job	1 December 1977 (aged 20)		(France) Lyon
22	GK	Alioum Boukar	3 January 1972 (aged 26)		(Turkey) Samsunspor

=== Matches ===
11 June 1998
21:00

Cameroon	1–1	Austria
Njanka 78'	Report	Polster 90'

Stade de Toulouse, Toulouse
Attendance: 33,460
Referee: Epifanio González (Paraguay)

Cameroon	Austria

GK	1	Jacques Songo'o
DF	3	Pierre Womé
DF	4	Rigobert Song
DF	5	Raymond Kalla
DF	6	Pierre Njanka
FW	7	François Omam-Biyik (c)		(substituted off) 84'
MF	8	Didier Angibeaud
FW	10	Patrick M'Boma
MF	14	Augustine Simo		(substituted off) 65'
MF	15	Joseph N'Do
MF	18	Samuel Ipoua	(yellow card) 30'	(substituted off) 65'
Substitutions:
MF	20	Salomon Olembé		(substituted on) 65'
FW	21	Joseph-Désiré Job		(substituted on) 65'
FW	9	Alphonse Tchami		(substituted on) 84'
Manager:
(France) Claude Le Roy

GK	1	Michael Konsel
DF	3	Peter Schöttel
DF	4	Anton Pfeffer	(yellow card) 27'
DF	5	Wolfgang Feiersinger
MF	8	Heimo Pfeifenberger		(substituted off) 82'
MF	10	Andreas Herzog		(substituted off) 82'
MF	13	Harald Cerny		(substituted off) 82'
MF	15	Arnold Wetl
MF	17	Roman Mählich
FW	19	Toni Polster (c)
MF	22	Dietmar Kühbauer
Substitutions:
FW	7	Mario Haas		(substituted on) 82'
FW	9	Ivica Vastić		(substituted on) 82'
MF	18	Peter Stöger		(substituted on) 82'
Manager:
Herbert Prohaska

Assistant referees:
Celestino Galván (Paraguay)
Reynaldo Salinas (Honduras)
Fourth official:
Arturo Brizio Carter (Mexico)

17 June 1998
21:00

Italy	3–0	Cameroon
Di Biagio 7'; Vieri 75', 89'	Report

Stade de la Mosson, Montpellier
Attendance: 29,800
Referee: Edward Lennie (Australia)

Italy	Cameroon

GK	12	Gianluca Pagliuca
DF	3	Paolo Maldini (c)
DF	4	Fabio Cannavaro
DF	5	Alessandro Costacurta	(yellow card) 26'
DF	6	Alessandro Nesta
MF	9	Demetrio Albertini		(substituted off) 62'
MF	11	Dino Baggio
MF	14	Luigi Di Biagio	(yellow card) 63'
MF	17	Francesco Moriero		(substituted off) 83'
FW	18	Roberto Baggio		(substituted off) 65'
FW	21	Christian Vieri
Substitutions:
MF	16	Roberto Di Matteo		(substituted on) 62'
FW	10	Alessandro Del Piero		(substituted on) 65'
MF	15	Angelo Di Livio		(substituted on) 83'
Manager:
Cesare Maldini

GK	1	Jacques Songo'o
DF	3	Pierre Womé	(yellow card) 6'
DF	4	Rigobert Song	(yellow card) 85'
DF	5	Raymond Kalla	(red card) 42'
DF	6	Pierre Njanka	(yellow card) 16'
FW	7	François Omam-Biyik (c)		(substituted off) 66'
MF	8	Didier Angibeaud	(yellow card) 79'
FW	10	Patrick M'Boma		(substituted off) 66'
MF	15	Joseph N'Do
MF	18	Samuel Ipoua		(substituted off) 45'
MF	20	Salomon Olembé
Substitutions:
FW	21	Joseph-Désiré Job		(substituted on) 45'
FW	9	Alphonse Tchami		(substituted on) 66'
FW	11	Samuel Eto'o		(substituted on) 66'
Manager:
(France) Claude Le Roy

Assistant referees:
Lencie Fred (Vanuatu)
Claudio Rossi (Argentina)
Fourth official:
Pirom Un-Prasert (Thailand)

23 June 1998
16:00

Chile	1–1	Cameroon
Sierra 20'	Report	M'Boma 55'

Stade de la Beaujoire, Nantes
Attendance: 35,500
Referee: Laszlo Vagner (Hungary)

Chile	Cameroon

GK	1	Nelson Tapia
DF	3	Ronald Fuentes
DF	4	Francisco Rojas	(yellow card) 55'	(substituted off) 77'
DF	5	Javier Margas
DF	6	Pedro Reyes
MF	7	Nelson Parraguez	(yellow card) 50'
MF	8	Clarence Acuña
FW	9	Iván Zamorano (c)
MF	10	José Luis Sierra		(substituted off) 70'
FW	11	Marcelo Salas
DF	15	Moisés Villarroel	(yellow card) 66'	(substituted off) 70'
Substitutions:
MF	19	Fernando Cornejo		(substituted on) 70'
MF	20	Fabián Estay		(substituted on) 70'
DF	14	Miguel Ramírez	(yellow card) 89'	(substituted on) 77'
Manager:
(Uruguay) Nelson Acosta

GK	1	Jacques Songo'o
DF	3	Pierre Womé
DF	4	Rigobert Song	(yellow card) 8' (red card) 51'
DF	6	Pierre Njanka
FW	7	François Omam-Biyik (c)
FW	10	Patrick M'Boma
MF	15	Joseph N'Do		(substituted off) 82'
FW	17	Michel Pensée
FW	19	Marcel Mahouvé
MF	20	Salomon Olembé		(substituted off) 68'
FW	21	Joseph-Désiré Job		(substituted off) 72'
Substitutions:
MF	8	Didier Angibeaud		(substituted on) 68'
FW	9	Alphonse Tchami		(substituted on) 72'
DF	12	Lauren	(red card) 88'	(substituted on) 82'
Manager:
(France) Claude Le Roy

Assistant referees:
Nimal Wickeramatunge (Sri Lanka)
Halim Abdul Hamid (Malaysia)
Fourth official:
José María García-Aranda (Spain)

=== Squad ===
Head coach: (Germany) Winfried Schäfer

No.	Pos.	Player	Date of birth (age)	Caps	Club
1	GK	Alioum Boukar	3 January 1972 (aged 30)	46	(Turkey) Samsunspor
2	MF	Bill Tchato	14 May 1975 (aged 27)	12	(France) Montpellier
3	DF	Pierre Womé	26 March 1979 (aged 23)	46	(Italy) Bologna
4	DF	Rigobert Song (c)	1 July 1976 (aged 25)	59	(Germany) 1. FC Köln
5	DF	Raymond Kalla	22 April 1975 (aged 27)	47	(Spain) Extremadura
6	DF	Pierre Njanka	15 March 1975 (aged 27)	31	(France) Strasbourg
7	MF	Joseph N'Do	28 April 1976 (aged 26)	16	(Saudi Arabia) Al-Khaleej
8	DF	Geremi	20 December 1978 (aged 23)	38	(Spain) Real Madrid
9	FW	Samuel Eto'o	10 March 1981 (aged 21)	27	(Spain) Mallorca
10	FW	Patrick M'Boma	15 November 1970 (aged 31)	42	(England) Sunderland
11	FW	Pius N'Diefi	5 July 1975 (aged 26)	13	(France) Sedan
12	MF	Lauren	19 January 1977 (aged 25)	15	(England) Arsenal
13	DF	Lucien Mettomo	19 April 1977 (aged 25)	17	(England) Manchester City
14	MF	Joël Epalle	20 February 1978 (aged 24)	22	(Greece) Panathinaikos
15	MF	Nicolas Alnoudji	9 December 1979 (aged 22)	15	(Turkey) Rizespor
16	GK	Jacques Songo'o	17 March 1964 (aged 38)	66	(France) Metz
17	MF	Marc-Vivien Foé	1 May 1975 (aged 27)	47	(France) Lyon
18	FW	Patrick Suffo	17 January 1978 (aged 24)	18	(England) Sheffield United
19	MF	Eric Djemba-Djemba	4 May 1981 (aged 21)	0	(France) Nantes
20	MF	Salomon Olembé	8 December 1980 (aged 21)	39	(France) Marseille
21	FW	Joseph-Désiré Job	1 December 1977 (aged 24)	34	(France) Metz
22	GK	Carlos Kameni	18 February 1984 (aged 18)	1	(France) Le Havre
23	MF	Daniel Kome	19 May 1980 (aged 22)	4	(Spain) Numancia

=== Matches ===
1 June 2002
15:30

Republic of Ireland	1–1	Cameroon
Holland 52'	Report	M'Boma 39'

Niigata Stadium, Niigata
Attendance: 33,679
Referee: Toru Kamikawa (Japan)

Republic of Ireland	Cameroon

GK	1	Shay Given
RB	18	Gary Kelly
CB	14	Gary Breen
CB	5	Steve Staunton (c)
LB	3	Ian Harte		(substituted off) 77'
RM	7	Jason McAteer	(yellow card) 30'	(substituted off) 46'
CM	12	Mark Kinsella
CM	8	Matt Holland
LM	11	Kevin Kilbane
CF	10	Robbie Keane
CF	9	Damien Duff
Substitutions:
DF	2	Steve Finnan	(yellow card) 51'	(substituted on) 46'
MF	21	Steven Reid	(yellow card) 82'	(substituted on) 77'
Manager:
Mick McCarthy

GK	1	Boukar Alioum
CB	4	Rigobert Song (c)
CB	5	Raymond Kalla	(yellow card) 89'
CB	2	Bill Tchato
RWB	8	Geremi
LWB	3	Pierre Womé
RM	12	Lauren
CM	17	Marc-Vivien Foé
LM	20	Salomon Olembé
CF	9	Samuel Eto'o
CF	10	Patrick M'Boma		(substituted off) 69'
Substitutions:
FW	18	Patrick Suffo		(substituted on) 69'
Manager:
(Germany) Winfried Schäfer

Man of the Match:
Matt Holland (Republic of Ireland)

Assistant referees:
Mat Lazim Awang Hamat (Malaysia)
Roland Van Nylen (Belgium)
Fourth official:
Peter Prendergast (Jamaica)

6 June 2002
18:00

Cameroon	1–0	Saudi Arabia
Eto'o 66'	Report

Saitama Stadium, Saitama
Attendance: 52,328
Referee: Terje Hauge (Norway)

Cameroon	Saudi Arabia

GK	1	Boukar Alioum
CB	4	Rigobert Song (c)
CB	5	Raymond Kalla
CB	2	Bill Tchato
RWB	8	Geremi
LWB	3	Pierre Womé	(yellow card) 10'	(substituted off) 84'
RM	12	Lauren
CM	17	Marc-Vivien Foé
LM	23	Daniel Kome		(substituted off) 46'
CF	10	Patrick M'Boma		(substituted off) 74'
CF	9	Samuel Eto'o
Substitutions:
MF	20	Salomon Olembé		(substituted on) 46'
FW	11	Pius N'Diefi		(substituted on) 74'
DF	6	Pierre Njanka		(substituted on) 84'
Manager:
(Germany) Winfried Schäfer

GK	1	Mohamed Al-Deayea (c)
RB	2	Mohammed Al-Jahani
CB	3	Redha Tukar
CB	6	Fouzi Al-Shehri
CB	4	Abdullah Zubromawi		(substituted off) 72'
LB	13	Hussein Sulimani
RM	17	Abdullah Al-Waked
CM	18	Nawaf Al-Temyat
CM	7	Ibrahim Al-Shahrani
LM	14	Abdulaziz Khathran		(substituted off) 86'
CF	11	Obeid Al-Dosari		(substituted off) 36'
Substitutions:
FW	20	Al Hasan Al-Yami	(yellow card) 59'	(substituted on) 36'
MF	15	Abdullah Jumaan Al-Dosari		(substituted on) 72'
MF	8	Mohammed Noor		(substituted on) 86'
Manager:
Nasser Al-Johar

Man of the Match:
Samuel Eto'o (Cameroon)

Assistant referees:
Roland Van Nylen (Belgium)
Maciej Wierzbowsky (Poland)
Fourth official:
Carlos Simon (Brazil)

11 June 2002
20:30

Cameroon	0–2	Germany
	Report	Bode 50'; Klose 79'

Ecopa Stadium, Shizuoka
Attendance: 47,085
Referee: Antonio López Nieto (Spain)

Cameroon	Germany

GK	1	Boukar Alioum
CB	4	Rigobert Song (c)	(yellow card) 42'
CB	5	Raymond Kalla
CB	2	Bill Tchato	(yellow card) 44'	(substituted off) 53'
RWB	8	Geremi	(yellow card) 56'
LWB	3	Pierre Womé
RM	12	Lauren	(yellow card) 81'
CM	17	Marc-Vivien Foé	(yellow card) 8'
LM	20	Salomon Olembé	(yellow card) 58'	(substituted off) 64'
CF	9	Samuel Eto'o
CF	10	Patrick M'Boma		(substituted off) 80'
Substitutions:
FW	18	Patrick Suffo	(yellow card) 60' (yellow-red card) 77'	(substituted on) 53'
MF	23	Daniel Kome		(substituted on) 64'
FW	21	Joseph-Désiré Job		(substituted on) 80'
Manager:
(Germany) Winfried Schäfer

GK	1	Oliver Kahn (c)	(yellow card) 42'
CB	2	Thomas Linke
CB	5	Carsten Ramelow	(yellow card) 37' (yellow-red card) 40'
CB	21	Christoph Metzelder
CM	22	Torsten Frings	(yellow card) 74'
CM	8	Dietmar Hamann	(yellow card) 29'
RW	19	Bernd Schneider		(substituted off) 80'
AM	13	Michael Ballack	(yellow card) 31'
LW	6	Christian Ziege	(yellow card) 72'
CF	11	Miroslav Klose		(substituted off) 84'
CF	9	Carsten Jancker	(yellow card) 9'	(substituted off) 46'
Substitutions:
MF	17	Marco Bode		(substituted on) 46'
MF	16	Jens Jeremies		(substituted on) 80'
FW	7	Oliver Neuville		(substituted on) 84'
Manager:
Rudi Völler

Man of the Match:
Miroslav Klose (Germany)

Assistant referees:
Mohamed Saeed (Maldives)
Jorge Oliveira (Brazil)
Fourth official:
Pierluigi Collina (Italy)

=== Group E Final Standings ===
The winners of this group, Netherlands, advanced to face the Group F runners-up, Slovakia, while Japan, as Group E runners-up, faced Group F winners Paraguay. Cameroon was the first team to be eliminated in the World Cup, following their 2–1 defeat by Denmark on 19 June 2010.

Pos	Team	Pld	W	D	L	GF	GA	GD	Pts	Qualification
1	Netherlands	3	3	0	0	5	1	+4	9	Advance to knockout stage
2	Japan	3	2	0	1	4	2	+2	6	Advance to knockout stage
3	Denmark	3	1	0	2	3	6	−3	3	
4	Cameroon	3	0	0	3	2	5	−3	0	

Source: FIFA
Rules for classification: Tie-breaking criteria

All times local (UTC+02)

=== Group E Matches ===
==== Japan vs Cameroon ====
14 June 2010
16:00

Japan	1–0	Cameroon
Honda 39'	Report

Free State Stadium, Bloemfontein
Attendance: 30,620
Referee: Olegário Benquerença (Portugal)

Japan	Cameroon

GK	21	Eiji Kawashima
RB	5	Yuto Nagatomo
CB	22	Yuji Nakazawa
CB	4	Marcus Tulio Tanaka
LB	3	Yūichi Komano
DM	2	Yuki Abe	(yellow card) 90+1'
RM	8	Daisuke Matsui		(substituted off) 69'
CM	18	Keisuke Honda
CM	17	Makoto Hasebe (c)		(substituted off) 88'
LM	7	Yasuhito Endō
CF	16	Yoshito Ōkubo		(substituted off) 82'
Substitutions:
FW	9	Shinji Okazaki		(substituted on) 69'
FW	12	Kisho Yano		(substituted on) 82'
MF	20	Junichi Inamoto		(substituted on) 88'
Manager:
Takeshi Okada

GK	16	Souleymanou Hamidou
RB	19	Stéphane Mbia
CB	3	Nicolas N'Koulou	(yellow card) 72'
CB	5	Sébastien Bassong
LB	2	Benoît Assou-Ekotto
RM	21	Joël Matip		(substituted off) 63'
CM	11	Jean Makoun		(substituted off) 75'
LM	18	Eyong Enoh
RW	9	Samuel Eto'o (c)
CF	15	Pierre Webó
LW	13	Eric Maxim Choupo-Moting		(substituted off) 75'
Substitutions:
MF	10	Achille Emana		(substituted on) 63'
MF	8	Geremi		(substituted on) 75'
FW	17	Mohammadou Idrissou		(substituted on) 75'
Manager:
(France) Paul Le Guen

Man of the Match:
Keisuke Honda (Japan)

Assistant referees:
José Cardinal (Portugal)
Bertino Miranda (Portugal)
Fourth official:
Óscar Ruiz (Colombia)
Fifth official:
Abraham Gonzalez (Colombia)

=== Cameroon vs Denmark ===
19 June 2010
20:30

Cameroon	1–2	Denmark
Eto'o 10'	Report	Bendtner 33'; Rommedahl 61'

Loftus Versfeld Stadium, Pretoria
Attendance: 38,074
Referee: Jorge Larrionda (Uruguay)

Cameroon	Denmark

GK	16	Souleymanou Hamidou
RB	19	Stéphane Mbia	(yellow card) 75'
CB	3	Nicolas N'Koulou
CB	5	Sébastien Bassong	(yellow card) 49'	(substituted off) 72'
LB	2	Benoît Assou-Ekotto
RM	6	Alex Song
CM	8	Geremi
CM	18	Eyong Enoh		(substituted off) 46'
LM	10	Achille Emana
SS	15	Pierre Webó		(substituted off) 78'
CF	9	Samuel Eto'o (c)
Substitutions:
MF	11	Jean Makoun		(substituted on) 46'
FW	17	Mohammadou Idrissou		(substituted on) 72'
FW	23	Vincent Aboubakar		(substituted on) 78'
Manager:
(France) Paul Le Guen

GK	1	Thomas Sørensen	(yellow card) 86'
RB	6	Lars Jacobsen
CB	3	Simon Kjær	(yellow card) 87'
CB	4	Daniel Agger
LB	15	Simon Poulsen
CM	2	Christian Poulsen
CM	10	Martin Jørgensen		(substituted off) 46'
RW	19	Dennis Rommedahl
AM	9	Jon Dahl Tomasson (c)		(substituted off) 86'
LW	8	Jesper Grønkjær		(substituted off) 67'
CF	11	Nicklas Bendtner
Substitutions:
MF	7	Daniel Jensen		(substituted on) 46'
MF	12	Thomas Kahlenberg		(substituted on) 67'
MF	14	Jakob Poulsen		(substituted on) 86'
Manager:
Morten Olsen

Man of the Match:
Daniel Agger (Denmark)

Assistant referees:
Pablo Fandino (Uruguay)
Mauricio Espinosa (Uruguay)
Fourth official:
Peter O'Leary (New Zealand)
Fifth official:
Brent Best (New Zealand)

=== Cameroon vs Netherlands ===
24 June 2010
20:30

Cameroon	1–2	Netherlands
Eto'o 65' (pen.)	Report	Van Persie 36'; Huntelaar 83'

Cape Town Stadium, Cape Town
Attendance: 63,093
Referee: Pablo Pozo (Chile)

Cameroon	Netherlands

GK	16	Souleymanou Hamidou
RB	8	Geremi
CB	19	Stéphane Mbia	(yellow card) 81'
CB	3	Nicolas N'Koulou	(yellow card) 25'	(substituted off) 73'
LB	2	Benoît Assou-Ekotto
RM	11	Jean Makoun
CM	14	Aurélien Chedjou
CM	7	Landry N'Guémo
LM	12	Gaëtan Bong		(substituted off) 56'
CF	9	Samuel Eto'o (c)
CF	13	Eric Choupo-Moting		(substituted off) 72'
Substitutions:
FW	23	Vincent Aboubakar		(substituted on) 56'
FW	17	Mohammadou Idrissou		(substituted on) 72'
DF	4	Rigobert Song		(substituted on) 73'
Manager:
(France) Paul Le Guen

GK	1	Maarten Stekelenburg
RB	12	Khalid Boulahrouz
CB	3	John Heitinga
CB	4	Joris Mathijsen
LB	5	Giovanni van Bronckhorst (c)	(yellow card) 70'
CM	6	Mark van Bommel
CM	8	Nigel de Jong
RW	7	Dirk Kuyt	(yellow card) 17'	(substituted off) 66'
AM	10	Wesley Sneijder
LW	23	Rafael van der Vaart	(yellow card) 65'	(substituted off) 73'
CF	9	Robin van Persie		(substituted off) 59'
Substitutions:
FW	21	Klaas-Jan Huntelaar		(substituted on) 59'
FW	17	Eljero Elia		(substituted on) 66'
FW	11	Arjen Robben		(substituted on) 73'
Manager:
Bert van Marwijk

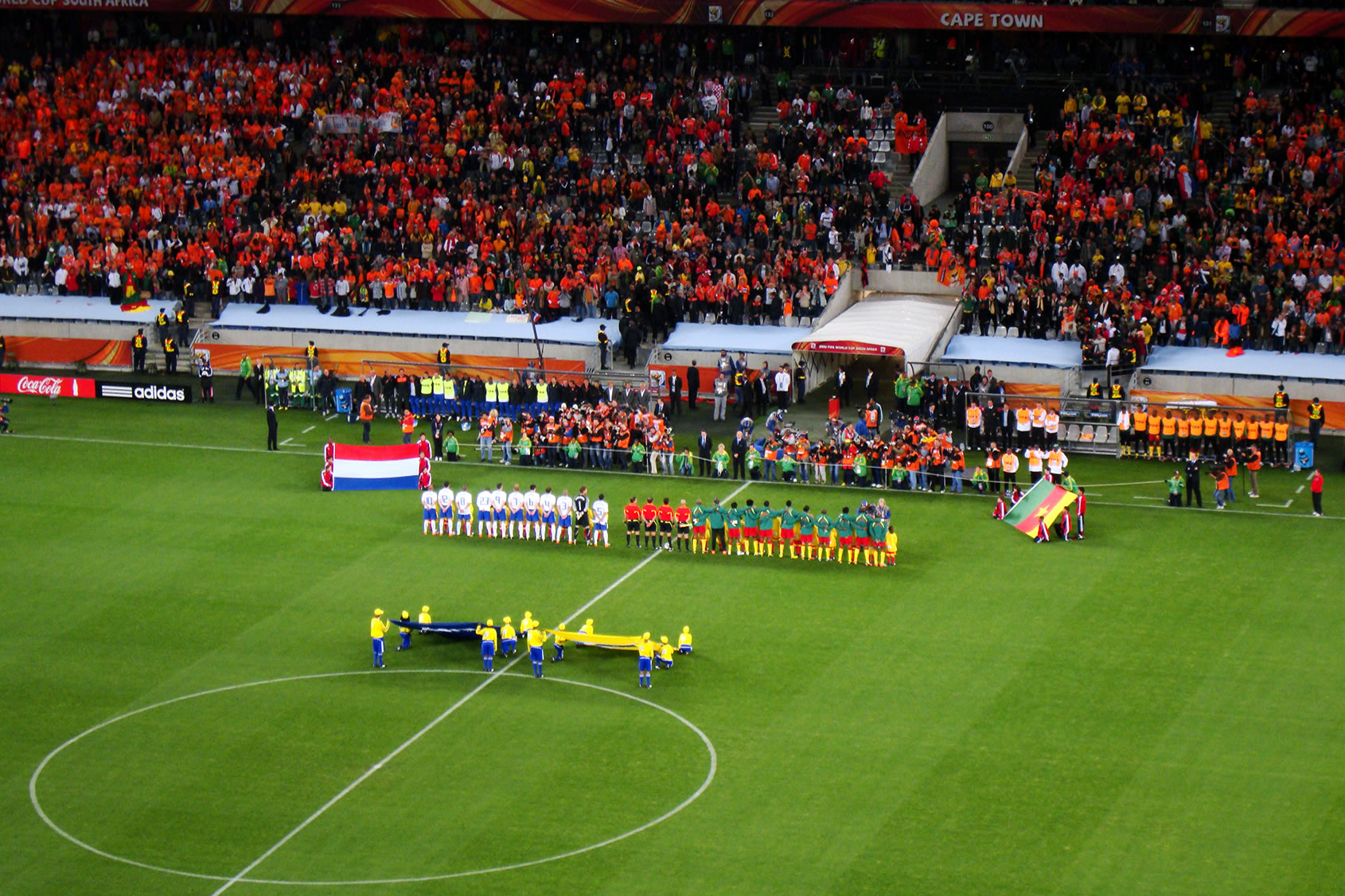
The Netherlands and Cameroon teams line up prior to the game.

Man of the Match:
Robin van Persie (Netherlands)

Assistant referees:
Patricio Basualto (Chile)
Francisco Mondria (Chile)
Fourth official:
Khalil Al Ghamdi (Saudi Arabia)
Fifth official:
Saleh Al Marzouqi (United Arab Emirates)

=== Group A Final Standings ===
Legend
Group winners and runners-up advance to the round of 16

Pos	Team	Pld	W	D	L	GF	GA	GD	Pts	Qualification
1	Brazil (H)	3	2	1	0	7	2	+5	7	Advance to knockout stage
2	Mexico	3	2	1	0	4	1	+3	7	Advance to knockout stage
3	Croatia	3	1	0	2	6	6	0	3	
4	Cameroon	3	0	0	3	1	9	−8	0	

Source: FIFA
Rules for classification: Tie-breaking criteria
(H) Hosts
- Brazil advance to play Chile (runner-up of Group B) in the round of 16.
- Mexico advance to play Netherlands (winner of Group B) in the round of 16.

=== Mexico vs Cameroon ===
13 June 2014
13:00 UTC−3

Mexico	1–0	Cameroon
Peralta 61'	Report

Arena das Dunas, Natal
Attendance: 39,216
Referee: Wilmar Roldán (Colombia)

Mexico	Cameroon

GK	13	Guillermo Ochoa
CB	2	Francisco Rodríguez
CB	4	Rafael Márquez (c)
CB	15	Héctor Moreno	(yellow card) 57'
RWB	22	Paul Aguilar
LWB	7	Miguel Layún
DM	23	José Juan Vázquez
CM	6	Héctor Herrera		(substituted off) 90+1'
CM	18	Andrés Guardado		(substituted off) 69'
SS	10	Giovani dos Santos
CF	19	Oribe Peralta		(substituted off) 74'
Substitutions:
MF	8	Marco Fabián		(substituted on) 69'
FW	14	Javier Hernández		(substituted on) 74'
DF	3	Carlos Salcido		(substituted on) 90+1'
Manager:
Miguel Herrera

GK	16	Charles Itandje
RB	4	Cédric Djeugoué		(substituted off) 46'
CB	3	Nicolas N'Koulou
CB	14	Aurélien Chedjou
LB	2	Benoît Assou-Ekotto
DM	6	Alex Song		(substituted off) 79'
RM	17	Stéphane Mbia
LM	18	Eyong Enoh
AM	8	Benjamin Moukandjo
AM	13	Eric Maxim Choupo-Moting
CF	9	Samuel Eto'o (c)
Substitutions:
DF	5	Dany Nounkeu	(yellow card) 77'	(substituted on) 46'
FW	15	Pierre Webó		(substituted on) 79'
Manager:
(Germany) Volker Finke

Man of the Match:
Giovani dos Santos (Mexico)

Assistant referees:
Humberto Clavijo (Colombia)
Eduardo Díaz (Colombia)
Fourth official:
Norbert Hauata (Tahiti)
Fifth official:
Aden Marwa (Kenya)

=== Cameroon vs Croatia ===
18 June 2014
18:00 UTC−4

Cameroon	0–4	Croatia
	Report	Olić 11'; Perišić 48'; Mandžukić 61', 73'

Arena da Amazônia, Manaus
Attendance: 39,982
Referee: Pedro Proença (Portugal)

Cameroon	Croatia

GK	16	Charles Itandje
RB	17	Stéphane Mbia
CB	14	Aurélien Chedjou		(substituted off) 46'
CB	3	Nicolas N'Koulou (c)
LB	2	Benoît Assou-Ekotto
DM	21	Joël Matip
CM	6	Alex Song	(red card) 40'
CM	18	Eyong Enoh
RW	13	Eric Maxim Choupo-Moting		(substituted off) 75'
LW	8	Benjamin Moukandjo
CF	10	Vincent Aboubakar		(substituted off) 70'
Substitutions:
DF	5	Dany Nounkeu		(substituted on) 46'
FW	15	Pierre Webó		(substituted on) 70'
MF	20	Edgar Salli		(substituted on) 75'
Manager:
(Germany) Volker Finke

GK	1	Stipe Pletikosa
RB	11	Darijo Srna (c)
CB	5	Vedran Ćorluka
CB	6	Dejan Lovren
LB	3	Danijel Pranjić
CM	10	Luka Modrić
CM	7	Ivan Rakitić
RW	4	Ivan Perišić		(substituted off) 78'
AM	19	Sammir		(substituted off) 72'
LW	18	Ivica Olić		(substituted off) 69'
CF	17	Mario Mandžukić
Substitutions:
FW	22	Eduardo	(yellow card) 89'	(substituted on) 69'
MF	20	Mateo Kovačić		(substituted on) 72'
FW	16	Ante Rebić		(substituted on) 78'
Manager:
Niko Kovač

Man of the Match:
Mario Mandžukić (Croatia)

Assistant referees:
Bertino Cunha (Portugal)
Tiago Trigo (Portugal)
Fourth official:
Walter López (Guatemala)
Fifth official:
Leonel Leal (Costa Rica)

=== Cameroon vs Brazil ===
23 June 2014
17:00 UTC−3

Cameroon	1–4	Brazil
Matip 26'	Report	Neymar 17', 35'; Fred 49'; Fernandinho 84'

Estádio Nacional Mané Garrincha, Brasília
Attendance: 69,112
Referee: Jonas Eriksson (Sweden)

Cameroon	Brazil

GK	16	Charles Itandje
RB	22	Allan Nyom
CB	3	Nicolas N'Koulou (c)
CB	21	Joël Matip
LB	12	Henri Bedimo
DM	7	Landry N'Guémo
CM	17	Stéphane Mbia	(yellow card) 80'
CM	18	Eyong Enoh	(yellow card) 11'
RW	13	Eric Maxim Choupo-Moting		(substituted off) 81'
LW	8	Benjamin Moukandjo		(substituted off) 58'
CF	10	Vincent Aboubakar		(substituted off) 72'
Substitutions:
MF	20	Edgar Salli	(yellow card) 76'	(substituted on) 58'
FW	15	Pierre Webó		(substituted on) 72'
MF	11	Jean Makoun		(substituted on) 81'
Manager:
(Germany) Volker Finke

GK	12	Júlio César
RB	2	Dani Alves
CB	3	Thiago Silva (c)
CB	4	David Luiz
LB	6	Marcelo
DM	17	Luiz Gustavo
RM	8	Paulinho	(substituted off) 46'
LM	11	Oscar
RW	7	Hulk	(substituted off) 63'
LW	10	Neymar	(substituted off) 71'
CF	9	Fred
Substitutions:
MF	5	Fernandinho	(substituted on) 46'
MF	16	Ramires	(substituted on) 63'
MF	19	Willian	(substituted on) 71'
Manager:
Luiz Felipe Scolari

Man of the Match:
Neymar (Brazil)

Assistant referees:
Mathias Klasenius (Sweden)
Daniel Wärnmark (Sweden)
Fourth official:
Svein Oddvar Moen (Norway)
Fifth official:
Kim Haglund (Norway)

=== Group stage ===
Pos	Team	Pld	W	D	L	GF	GA	GD	Pts	Qualification
1	Brazil	3	2	0	1	3	1	+2	6	Advanced to knockout stage
2	Switzerland	3	2	0	1	4	3	+1	6	Advanced to knockout stage
3	Cameroon	3	1	1	1	4	4	0	4	
4	Serbia	3	0	1	2	5	8	−3	1	

Source: FIFA
Rules for classification: Group stage tiebreakers
24 November 2022
13:00

Switzerland	1–0	Cameroon
Embolo 48'

Al Janoub Stadium, Al Wakrah
Attendance: 39,089
Referee: Facundo Tello (Argentina)

28 November 2022
13:00

Cameroon	3–3	Serbia
Castelletto 29'; Aboubakar 63'; Choupo-Moting 66'		Pavlović 45+1'; S. Milinković-Savić 45+3'; A. Mitrović 53'

Al Janoub Stadium, Al Wakrah
Attendance: 39,789
Referee: Mohammed Abdulla Hassan Mohamed (United Arab Emirates)

2 December 2022
22:00

Cameroon	1–0	Brazil
Aboubakar 90+2'

Lusail Stadium, Lusail
Attendance: 85,986
Referee: Ismail Elfath (United States)

== Player records ==
=== Most appearances ===
Rank	Player	Matches	World Cups
1	François Omam-Biyik	11	1990, 1994 and 1998
2	Roger Milla	10	1982, 1990 and 1994
3	Rigobert Song	9	1994, 1998, 2002 and 2010
4	Thomas N'Kono	8	1982 and 1990
4	Louis-Paul Mfédé	8	1990 and 1994
4	Stephen Tataw	8	1990 and 1994
4	Raymond Kalla	8	1994, 1998 and 2002
4	Samuel Eto'o	8	1998, 2002, 2010 and 2014
4	Eric Maxim Choupo-Moting	8	2010, 2014 and 2022
4	Nicolas Nkoulou	8	2010, 2014 and 2022

=== Goalscorers ===
Cameroon's top scorer at FIFA World Cup finals, Roger Milla, also holds the record as oldest player to ever score at a World Cup: aged 42 years and 39 days, he scored his side's only goal in a 1–6 group stage defeat against Russia in 1994. Grégoire M'Bida scored Cameroon's first-ever FIFA World Cup goal, coming against eventual winners Italy on 23 June 1982 in Vigo.

Rank	Player	Goals	World Cups
1	Roger Milla	5	1990 (4) and 1994 (1)
2	Samuel Eto'o	3	2002 and 2010
3	François Omam-Biyik	2	1990 and 1994
3	Patrick M'Boma	2	1998 and 2002
3	Vincent Aboubakar	2	2022
6	Grégoire M'Bida	1	1982
6	Emmanuel Kundé	1	1990
6	Eugène Ekéké	1	1990
6	David Embé	1	1994
6	Pierre Njanka	1	1998
6	Joël Matip	1	2014
6	Jean-Charles Castelletto	1	2022
6	Eric Maxim Choupo-Moting	1	2022

== Individual awards ==
Roger Milla won the Bronze Boot in 1990. He is the only individual award winner ever from Africa. At the age of 38 at the time, he is also the oldest boot award winner to date.

== See also ==
- African nations at the FIFA World Cup
- Cameroon at the FIFA Confederations Cup
- Cameroon at the Africa Cup of Nations
