= 1990 FIFA World Cup Group B =

Football tournament group stage

Play in Group B of the 1990 FIFA World Cup completed on 18 June 1990. Cameroon won the group, and advanced to the second round, along with Romania and World Cup holders Argentina. The Soviet Union failed to advance.

== Standings ==
Pos	Team	Pld	W	D	L	GF	GA	GD	Pts	Qualification
1	Cameroon	3	2	0	1	3	5	−2	4	Advance to knockout stage
2	Romania	3	1	1	1	4	3	+1	3	Advance to knockout stage
3	Argentina	3	1	1	1	3	2	+1	3	Advance to knockout stage
4	Soviet Union	3	1	0	2	4	4	0	2	

Source: FIFA
Rules for classification: Group stage tiebreakers

== Matches ==
All times local (CEST/UTC+2)

=== Argentina vs Cameroon ===
8 June 1990
18:00

Argentina	0–1	Cameroon
		Omam-Biyik 67'

San Siro, Milan
Attendance: 73,780
Referee: Michel Vautrot (France)

Argentina	Cameroon

GK	1	Nery Pumpido
SW	20	Juan Simón
DF	11	Néstor Fabbri
DF	19	Oscar Ruggeri		(substituted off) 46'
DF	13	Néstor Lorenzo
DF	17	Roberto Néstor Sensini	(yellow card) 27'	(substituted off) 69'
MF	4	José Basualdo
MF	2	Sergio Batista
MF	7	Jorge Burruchaga
FW	3	Abel Balbo
FW	10	Diego Maradona (c)
Substitutions:
GK	12	Sergio Goycochea
MF	6	Gabriel Calderón		(substituted on) 69'
FW	8	Claudio Caniggia		(substituted on) 46'
MF	16	Julio Olarticoechea
DF	18	José Serrizuela
Manager:
Carlos Bilardo

GK	16	Thomas N'Kono
SW	17	Victor N'Dip	(yellow card) 23'
DF	14	Stephen Tataw (c)
DF	6	Emmanuel Kundé
DF	4	Benjamin Massing	(yellow card) 9' (red card) 88'
DF	5	Bertin Ebwellé
MF	8	Emile M'Bouh	(yellow card) 54'
MF	2	André Kana-Biyik	(red card) 61'
MF	10	Louis-Paul M'Fédé		(substituted off) 66'
FW	7	François Omam-Biyik
FW	20	Cyrille Makanaky		(substituted off) 81'
Substitutions:
GK	22	Jacques Songo'o
FW	9	Roger Milla		(substituted on) 81'
MF	13	Jean-Claude Pagal
DF	15	Thomas Libiih		(substituted on) 66'
MF	21	Emmanuel Maboang
Manager:
(Soviet Union) Valery Nepomnyashchy

Assistant referees:
Vincent Mauro (United States)
Michał Listkiewicz (Poland)

=== Soviet Union vs Romania ===
9 June 1990
17:00

Soviet Union	0–2	Romania
		Lăcătuș 41', 55' (pen.)

Stadio San Nicola, Bari
Attendance: 42,907
Referee: Juan Daniel Cardellino (Uruguay)

Soviet Union	Romania

GK	1	Rinat Dasayev (c)
DF	4	Oleh Kuznetsov
DF	3	Vagiz Khidiyatullin	(yellow card) 11'
DF	20	Sergei Gorlukovich
MF	7	Sergei Aleinikov
MF	8	Hennadiy Lytovchenko		(substituted off) 66'
MF	9	Oleksandr Zavarov
MF	2	Volodymyr Bezsonov
MF	6	Vasyl Rats
FW	10	Oleh Protasov
FW	11	Igor Dobrovolski		(substituted off) 71'
Substitutions:
GK	22	Aleksandr Uvarov
FW	12	Aleksandr Borodyuk		(substituted on) 71'
MF	15	Ivan Yaremchuk		(substituted on) 66'
MF	17	Andrei Zygmantovich
MF	18	Igor Shalimov
Manager:
Valeriy Lobanovskyi

GK	1	Silviu Lung (c)
DF	2	Mircea Rednic
DF	4	Ioan Andone
DF	6	Gheorghe Popescu
DF	3	Michael Klein
MF	8	Ioan Sabău
MF	5	Iosif Rotariu
MF	21	Ioan Lupescu
MF	16	Daniel Timofte
FW	7	Marius Lăcătuș	(yellow card) 44'	(substituted off) 87'
FW	14	Florin Răducioiu		(substituted off) 80'
Substitutions:
GK	12	Bogdan Stelea
MF	11	Dănuț Lupu
FW	17	Ilie Dumitrescu		(substituted on) 87'
FW	18	Gavril Balint		(substituted on) 80'
DF	19	Emil Săndoi
Manager:
Emerich Jenei

Assistant referees:
Emilio Soriano Aladrén (Spain)
Hernán Silva (Chile)

=== Argentina vs Soviet Union ===
13 June 1990
21:00

Argentina	2–0	Soviet Union
Troglio 27'; Burruchaga 79'

Stadio San Paolo, Naples
Attendance: 55,759
Referee: Erik Fredriksson (Sweden)

Argentina	Soviet Union

GK	1	Nery Pumpido		(substituted off) 11'
SW	20	Juan Simón
DF	15	Pedro Monzón	(yellow card) 77'	(substituted off) 79'
DF	18	José Serrizuela	(yellow card) 55'
MF	4	José Basualdo
MF	2	Sergio Batista
MF	21	Pedro Troglio
MF	16	Julio Olarticoechea
MF	7	Jorge Burruchaga	(yellow card) 73'
FW	8	Claudio Caniggia	(yellow card) 57'
FW	10	Diego Maradona (c)	(yellow card) 70'
Substitutions:
GK	12	Sergio Goycochea		(substituted on) 11'
FW	6	Gabriel Calderón
FW	9	Gustavo Dezotti
DF	13	Néstor Lorenzo		(substituted on) 79'
MF	14	Ricardo Giusti
Manager:
Carlos Bilardo

GK	22	Aleksandr Uvarov
DF	2	Volodymyr Bezsonov	(red card) 48'
DF	3	Vagiz Khidiyatullin
DF	4	Oleh Kuznetsov (c)
DF	20	Sergei Gorlukovich
MF	7	Sergei Aleinikov
MF	17	Andrei Zygmantovich	(yellow card) 51'
MF	18	Igor Shalimov
MF	9	Oleksandr Zavarov		(substituted off) 86'
FW	10	Oleh Protasov		(substituted off) 75'
FW	11	Igor Dobrovolski
Substitutions:
GK	16	Viktor Chanov
DF	5	Anatoliy Demyanenko
MF	8	Hennadiy Lytovchenko		(substituted on) 75'
FW	14	Volodymyr Lyutyi		(substituted on) 86'
MF	15	Ivan Yaremchuk
Manager:
Valeriy Lobanovskyi

Assistant referees:
José Roberto Wright (Brazil)
Jamal Al Sharif (Syria)

=== Cameroon vs Romania ===
14 June 1990
17:00

Cameroon	2–1	Romania
Milla 76', 86'		Balint 88'

Stadio San Nicola, Bari
Attendance: 38,687
Referee: Hernán Silva (Chile)

Cameroon	Romania

GK	16	Thomas N'Kono	(yellow card) 68'
SW	17	Victor N'Dip
DF	14	Stephen Tataw (c)
DF	6	Emmanuel Kundé		(substituted off) 68'
DF	3	Jules Onana	(yellow card) 20'
DF	5	Bertin Ebwellé
MF	8	Emile M'Bouh
MF	21	Emmanuel Maboang		(substituted off) 58'
MF	10	Louis-Paul M'Fédé
FW	7	François Omam-Biyik
FW	20	Cyrille Makanaky
Substitutions:
GK	22	Jacques Songo'o
FW	9	Roger Milla		(substituted on) 58'
DF	13	Jean-Claude Pagal		(substituted on) 68'
DF	15	Thomas Libiih
FW	18	Bonaventure Djonkep
Manager:
(Soviet Union) Valery Nepomnyashchy

GK	1	Silviu Lung (c)
DF	2	Mircea Rednic
DF	4	Ioan Andone
DF	6	Gheorghe Popescu
DF	3	Michael Klein	(yellow card) 44'
MF	8	Ioan Sabău
MF	5	Iosif Rotariu
MF	10	Gheorghe Hagi		(substituted off) 55'
MF	16	Daniel Timofte
FW	7	Marius Lăcătuș
FW	14	Florin Răducioiu		(substituted off) 63'
Substitutions:
GK	12	Bogdan Stelea
FW	17	Ilie Dumitrescu		(substituted on) 55'
FW	18	Gavril Balint		(substituted on) 63'
DF	19	Emil Săndoi
MF	21	Ioan Lupescu
Manager:
Emerich Jenei

Assistant referees:
Carlos Silva Valente (Portugal)
Armando Pérez-Hoyos (Colombia)

=== Argentina vs Romania ===
18 June 1990
21:00

Argentina	1–1	Romania
Monzón 62'		Balint 68'

Stadio San Paolo, Naples
Attendance: 52,733
Referee: Carlos Silva Valente (Portugal)

Argentina	Romania

GK	12	Sergio Goycochea
DF	15	Pedro Monzón
DF	20	Juan Simón
DF	18	José Serrizuela	(yellow card) 72'
MF	4	José Basualdo
MF	21	Pedro Troglio		(substituted off) 53'
MF	2	Sergio Batista	(yellow card) 86'
MF	16	Julio Olarticoechea
MF	7	Jorge Burruchaga		(substituted off) 60'
FW	8	Claudio Caniggia
FW	10	Diego Maradona (c)
Substitutes:
GK	22	Fabián Cancelarich
FW	6	Gabriel Calderón
FW	9	Gustavo Dezotti		(substituted on) 60'
DF	13	Néstor Lorenzo
MF	14	Ricardo Giusti		(substituted on) 53'
Manager:
Carlos Bilardo

GK	1	Silviu Lung (c)
DF	2	Mircea Rednic
DF	4	Ioan Andone
DF	6	Gheorghe Popescu
DF	3	Michael Klein
MF	8	Ioan Sabău		(substituted off) 82'
MF	5	Iosif Rotariu
MF	10	Gheorghe Hagi	(yellow card) 8'
MF	21	Ioan Lupescu	(yellow card) 32'
FW	7	Marius Lăcătuș	(yellow card) 4'
FW	18	Gavril Balint		(substituted off) 72'
Substitutes:
GK	12	Bogdan Stelea
MF	11	Dănuț Lupu		(substituted on) 72'
DF	13	Adrian Popescu
FW	14	Florin Răducioiu
MF	15	Dorin Mateuţ		(substituted on) 82'
Manager:
Emerich Jenei

Assistant referees:
Berny Ulloa Morera (Costa Rica)
Carlo Longhi (Italy)

=== Cameroon vs Soviet Union ===
18 June 1990
21:00

Cameroon	0–4	Soviet Union
		Protasov 20'; Zygmantovich 29'; Zavarov 52'; Dobrovolski 63'

Stadio San Nicola, Bari
Attendance: 37,307
Referee: José Roberto Wright (Brazil)

Cameroon	Soviet Union

GK	16	Thomas N'Kono
SW	17	Victor N'Dip
DF	14	Stephen Tataw (c)
DF	6	Emmanuel Kundé		(substituted off) 34'
DF	3	Jules Onana
DF	5	Bertin Ebwellé
MF	8	Emile M'Bouh
MF	2	André Kana-Biyik	(yellow card) 61'
MF	10	Louis-Paul M'Fédé
FW	7	François Omam-Biyik
FW	20	Cyrille Makanaky		(substituted off) 56'
Substitutions:
GK	22	Jacques Songo'o
FW	9	Roger Milla	(yellow card) 66'	(substituted on) 34'
DF	13	Jean-Claude Pagal		(substituted on) 56'
FW	18	Bonaventure Djonkep
MF	21	Emmanuel Maboang
Manager:
(Soviet Union) Valery Nepomnyashchy

GK	22	Aleksandr Uvarov
DF	5	Anatoliy Demyanenko (c)
DF	3	Vagiz Khidiyatullin
DF	4	Oleh Kuznetsov
DF	20	Sergei Gorlukovich
MF	7	Sergei Aleinikov
MF	17	Andrei Zygmantovich
MF	18	Igor Shalimov		(substituted off) 46'
MF	10	Oleh Protasov	(yellow card) 75'
FW	8	Hennadiy Lytovchenko		(substituted off) 72'
FW	11	Igor Dobrovolski
Substitutes:
GK	16	Viktor Chanov
DF	6	Vasyl Rats
MF	9	Oleksandr Zavarov		(substituted on) 46'
MF	15	Ivan Yaremchuk		(substituted on) 72'
MF	21	Valeri Broshin
Manager:
Valeriy Lobanovskyi

Assistant referees:
Kurt Röthlisberger (Switzerland)
Pietro d'Elia (Italy)

== See also ==
- Argentina at the FIFA World Cup
- Cameroon at the FIFA World Cup
- Romania at the FIFA World Cup
- Soviet Union at the FIFA World Cup
