= 2002 FIFA World Cup Group E =

Football tournament group stage

Group E of the 2002 FIFA World Cup took place on 11 June 2002. Germany won the group, and advanced to the second round, along with the Republic of Ireland. Cameroon and Saudi Arabia failed to advance.

== Standings ==
| Pos | Team | Pld | W | D | L | GF | GA | GD | Pts | Qualification |
|---|---|---|---|---|---|---|---|---|---|---|
| 1 | Germany | 3 | 2 | 1 | 0 | 11 | 1 | +10 | 7 | Advance to knockout stage |
| 2 | Republic of Ireland | 3 | 1 | 2 | 0 | 5 | 2 | +3 | 5 | Advance to knockout stage |
| 3 | Cameroon | 3 | 1 | 1 | 1 | 2 | 3 | −1 | 4 | |
| 4 | Saudi Arabia | 3 | 0 | 0 | 3 | 0 | 12 | −12 | 0 | |

Source: FIFA
Rules for classification: Tie-breaking criteria
- Germany advanced to play Paraguay (runner-up of Group B) in the round of 16.
- Republic of Ireland advanced to play Spain (winner of Group B) in the round of 16.

== Matches ==
All times local (UTC+9)

=== Republic of Ireland vs Cameroon ===
1 June 2002
15:30

| Republic of Ireland | 1–1 | Cameroon |
|---|---|---|
| Holland 52' | | M'Boma 39' |

Niigata Stadium, Niigata
Attendance: 33,679
Referee: Toru Kamikawa (Japan)

| Republic of Ireland | Cameroon |

| GK | 1 | Shay Given |
| RB | 18 | Gary Kelly |
| CB | 14 | Gary Breen |
| CB | 5 | Steve Staunton (c) |
| LB | 3 | Ian Harte | | (substituted off) 77' |
| RM | 7 | Jason McAteer | (yellow card) 30' | (substituted off) 46' |
| CM | 12 | Mark Kinsella |
| CM | 8 | Matt Holland |
| LM | 11 | Kevin Kilbane |
| CF | 10 | Robbie Keane |
| CF | 9 | Damien Duff |
Substitutions:
| DF | 2 | Steve Finnan | (yellow card) 51' | (substituted on) 46' |
| MF | 21 | Steven Reid | (yellow card) 82' | (substituted on) 77' |
Manager:
Mick McCarthy

| GK | 1 | Boukar Alioum |
| CB | 4 | Rigobert Song (c) |
| CB | 5 | Raymond Kalla | (yellow card) 89' |
| CB | 2 | Bill Tchato |
| RWB | 8 | Geremi |
| LWB | 3 | Pierre Womé |
| CM | 12 | Lauren |
| CM | 17 | Marc-Vivien Foé |
| CM | 20 | Salomon Olembé |
| CF | 9 | Samuel Eto'o |
| CF | 10 | Patrick M'Boma | | (substituted off) 69' |
Substitutions:
| FW | 18 | Patrick Suffo | | (substituted on) 69' |
Manager:
(Germany) Winfried Schäfer

Man of the Match:
Matt Holland (Republic of Ireland)

Assistant referees:
Mat Lazim Awang Hamat (Malaysia)
Roland Van Nylen (Belgium)
Fourth official:
Peter Prendergast (Jamaica)

=== Germany vs Saudi Arabia ===
1 June 2002
20:30

| Germany | 8–0 | Saudi Arabia |
|---|---|---|
| Klose 20', 25', 70'; Ballack 40'; Jancker 45+1'; Linke 73'; Bierhoff 84'; Schneider 90+1' |

Sapporo Dome, Sapporo
Attendance: 32,218
Referee: Ubaldo Aquino (Paraguay)

| Germany | Saudi Arabia |

| GK | 1 | Oliver Kahn (c) |
| CB | 2 | Thomas Linke |
| CB | 5 | Carsten Ramelow | | (substituted off) 46' |
| CB | 21 | Christoph Metzelder |
| RM | 22 | Torsten Frings |
| CM | 19 | Bernd Schneider |
| CM | 8 | Dietmar Hamann | (yellow card) 83' |
| LM | 6 | Christian Ziege | (yellow card) 43' |
| AM | 13 | Michael Ballack |
| CF | 11 | Miroslav Klose | | (substituted off) 76' |
| CF | 9 | Carsten Jancker | | (substituted off) 67' |
Substitutions:
| MF | 16 | Jens Jeremies | | (substituted on) 46' |
| FW | 20 | Oliver Bierhoff | | (substituted on) 67' |
| FW | 7 | Oliver Neuville | | (substituted on) 76' |
Manager:
Rudi Völler

| GK | 1 | Mohammed Al-Deayea |
| RB | 12 | Ahmed Al-Dokhi |
| CB | 3 | Redha Tukar |
| CB | 4 | Abdullah Zubromawi |
| LB | 13 | Hussein Abdulghani |
| RM | 8 | Mohammed Noor | (yellow card) 90+1' |
| CM | 16 | Khamis Al-Dosari | | (substituted off) 46' |
| CM | 17 | Abdullah Al-Waked |
| LM | 18 | Nawaf Al-Temyat | | (substituted off) 46' |
| CF | 9 | Sami Al-Jaber (c) |
| CF | 20 | Al-Hasan Al-Yami | | (substituted off) 77' |
Substitutions:
| MF | 7 | Ibrahim Suwayed | | (substituted on) 46' |
| MF | 14 | Abdulaziz Al-Khathran | | (substituted on) 46' |
| FW | 15 | Abdullah Al-Jumaan | | (substituted on) 77' |
Manager:
Nasser Al-Johar

Man of the Match:
Miroslav Klose (Germany)

Assistant referees:
Miguel Giacomuzzi (Paraguay)
Michael Ragoonath (Trinidad and Tobago)
Fourth official:
René Ortubé (Bolivia)

=== Germany vs Republic of Ireland ===
5 June 2002
20:30

| Germany | 1–1 | Republic of Ireland |
|---|---|---|
| Klose 19' | | Robbie Keane 90+2' |

Kashima Soccer Stadium, Ibaraki
Attendance: 35,854
Referee: Kim Milton Nielsen (Denmark)

| Germany | Republic of Ireland |

| GK | 1 | Oliver Kahn (c) |
| CB | 2 | Thomas Linke |
| CB | 5 | Carsten Ramelow |
| CB | 21 | Christoph Metzelder |
| CM | 22 | Torsten Frings |
| CM | 8 | Dietmar Hamann |
| RW | 19 | Bernd Schneider | (substituted off) 89' |
| AM | 13 | Michael Ballack |
| LW | 6 | Christian Ziege |
| CF | 11 | Miroslav Klose | (substituted off) 85' |
| CF | 9 | Carsten Jancker | (substituted off) 75' |
Substitutions:
| FW | 20 | Oliver Bierhoff | (substituted on) 75' |
| MF | 17 | Marco Bode | (substituted on) 85' |
| MF | 16 | Jens Jeremies | (substituted on) 89' |
Manager:
Rudi Völler

| GK | 1 | Shay Given |
| RB | 2 | Steve Finnan |
| CB | 14 | Gary Breen |
| CB | 5 | Steve Staunton (c) | (substituted off) 87' |
| LB | 3 | Ian Harte | (substituted off) 73' |
| RM | 18 | Gary Kelly | (substituted off) 73' |
| CM | 12 | Mark Kinsella |
| CM | 8 | Matt Holland |
| LM | 11 | Kevin Kilbane |
| CF | 10 | Robbie Keane |
| CF | 9 | Damien Duff |
Substitutions:
| FW | 17 | Niall Quinn | (substituted on) 73' |
| MF | 21 | Steven Reid | (substituted on) 73' |
| DF | 4 | Kenny Cunningham | (substituted on) 87' |
Manager:
Mick McCarthy

Man of the Match:
Robbie Keane (Republic of Ireland)

Assistant referees:
Jens Larsen (Denmark)
Evzen Amler (Czech Republic)
Fourth official:
Mourad Daami (Tunisia)

=== Cameroon vs Saudi Arabia ===
6 June 2002
18:00

| Cameroon | 1–0 | Saudi Arabia |
|---|---|---|
| Eto'o 66' |

Saitama Stadium, Saitama
Attendance: 52,328
Referee: Terje Hauge (Norway)

| Cameroon | Saudi Arabia |

| GK | 1 | Boukar Alioum |
| CB | 4 | Rigobert Song (c) |
| CB | 5 | Raymond Kalla |
| CB | 2 | Bill Tchato |
| RWB | 8 | Geremi |
| LWB | 3 | Pierre Womé | (yellow card) 10' | (substituted off) 84' |
| CM | 12 | Lauren |
| CM | 17 | Marc-Vivien Foé |
| CM | 23 | Daniel N'Gom Kome | | (substituted off) 46' |
| CF | 10 | Patrick M'Boma | | (substituted off) 74' |
| CF | 9 | Samuel Eto'o |
Substitutions:
| MF | 20 | Salomon Olembé | | (substituted on) 46' |
| FW | 11 | Pius N'Diefi | | (substituted on) 74' |
| DF | 6 | Pierre Njanka | | (substituted on) 84' |
Manager:
(Germany) Winfried Schäfer

| GK | 1 | Mohamed Al-Deayea (c) |
| CB | 3 | Redha Tukar |
| CB | 6 | Fouzi Al-Shehri |
| CB | 4 | Abdullah Zubromawi | | (substituted off) 72' |
| RWB | 2 | Mohammed Al-Jahani |
| LWB | 13 | Hussein Abdulghani |
| RM | 17 | Abdullah Al-Waked |
| CM | 18 | Nawaf Al-Temyat |
| CM | 7 | Ibrahim Suwayed |
| LM | 14 | Abdulaziz Al-Khathran | | (substituted off) 86' |
| CF | 11 | Obeid Al-Dosari | | (substituted off) 35' |
Substitutions:
| FW | 20 | Al-Hasan Al-Yami | (yellow card) 59' | (substituted on) 35' |
| MF | 15 | Abdullah Al-Jumaan | | (substituted on) 72' |
| MF | 8 | Mohammed Noor | | (substituted on) 86' |
Manager:
Nasser Al-Johar

Man of the Match:
Samuel Eto'o (Cameroon)

Assistant referees:
Roland Van Nylen (Belgium)
Maciej Wierzbowsky (Poland)
Fourth official:
Carlos Simon (Brazil)

=== Cameroon vs Germany ===
11 June 2002
20:30

| Cameroon | 0–2 | Germany |
|---|---|---|
| | | Bode 50'; Klose 79' |

Ecopa Stadium, Shizuoka
Attendance: 47,085
Referee: Antonio López Nieto (Spain)

| Cameroon | Germany |

| GK | 1 | Alioum Boukar |
| CB | 4 | Rigobert Song (c) | (yellow card) 42' |
| CB | 5 | Raymond Kalla |
| CB | 2 | Bill Tchato | (yellow card) 44' | (substituted off) 53' |
| RWB | 8 | Geremi | (yellow card) 56' |
| LWB | 3 | Pierre Womé |
| CM | 12 | Lauren | (yellow card) 81' |
| CM | 17 | Marc-Vivien Foé | (yellow card) 8' |
| CM | 20 | Salomon Olembé | (yellow card) 58' | (substituted off) 64' |
| CF | 9 | Samuel Eto'o |
| CF | 10 | Patrick M'Boma | | (substituted off) 80' |
Substitutions:
| FW | 18 | Patrick Suffo | (yellow card) 60' (yellow-red card) 77' | (substituted on) 53' |
| MF | 23 | Daniel N'Gom Kome | | (substituted on) 64' |
| FW | 21 | Joseph-Désiré Job | | (substituted on) 80' |
Manager:
(Germany) Winfried Schäfer

| GK | 1 | Oliver Kahn (c) | (yellow card) 42' |
| CB | 2 | Thomas Linke |
| CB | 5 | Carsten Ramelow | (yellow card) 37' (yellow-red card) 40' |
| CB | 21 | Christoph Metzelder |
| CM | 22 | Torsten Frings | (yellow card) 74' |
| CM | 8 | Dietmar Hamann | (yellow card) 29' |
| RW | 19 | Bernd Schneider | | (substituted off) 80' |
| AM | 13 | Michael Ballack | (yellow card) 31' |
| LW | 6 | Christian Ziege | (yellow card) 72' |
| CF | 11 | Miroslav Klose | | (substituted off) 84' |
| CF | 9 | Carsten Jancker | (yellow card) 9' | (substituted off) 46' |
Substitutions:
| MF | 17 | Marco Bode | | (substituted on) 46' |
| MF | 16 | Jens Jeremies | | (substituted on) 80' |
| FW | 7 | Oliver Neuville | | (substituted on) 84' |
Manager:
Rudi Völler

Man of the Match:
Miroslav Klose (Germany)

Assistant referees:
Mohamed Saeed (Maldives)
Jorge Oliveira (Brazil)
Fourth official:
Pierluigi Collina (Italy)

=== Saudi Arabia vs Republic of Ireland ===
11 June 2002
20:30

| Saudi Arabia | 0–3 | Republic of Ireland |
|---|---|---|
| | | Robbie Keane 7'; Breen 61'; Duff 87' |

International Stadium Yokohama, Yokohama
Attendance: 65,320
Referee: Falla N'Doye (Senegal)

| Saudi Arabia | Republic of Ireland |

| GK | 1 | Mohamed Al-Deayea (c) |
| CB | 3 | Redha Tukar |
| CB | 6 | Fouzi Al-Shehri |
| CB | 4 | Abdullah Zubromawi | | (substituted off) 68' |
| RWB | 2 | Mohammed Al-Jahani | | (substituted off) 79' |
| LWB | 13 | Hussein Abdulghani |
| RM | 18 | Nawaf Al-Temyat | (yellow card) 61' |
| CM | 7 | Ibrahim Suwayed |
| CM | 16 | Khamis Al-Dosari |
| LM | 14 | Abdulaziz Al-Khathran | | (substituted off) 67' |
| CF | 20 | Al-Hasan Al-Yami |
Substitutions:
| MF | 10 | Mohammad Al-Shalhoub | | (substituted on) 67' |
| MF | 15 | Abdullah Al-Jumaan | | (substituted on) 68' |
| DF | 12 | Ahmed Al-Dokhi | | (substituted on) 79' |
Manager:
Nasser Al-Johar

| GK | 1 | Shay Given |
| RB | 2 | Steve Finnan |
| CB | 14 | Gary Breen |
| CB | 5 | Steve Staunton (c) | (yellow card) 70' |
| LB | 3 | Ian Harte | | (substituted off) 46' |
| RM | 18 | Gary Kelly | | (substituted off) 80' |
| CM | 12 | Mark Kinsella | | (substituted off) 89' |
| CM | 8 | Matt Holland |
| LM | 11 | Kevin Kilbane |
| CF | 10 | Robbie Keane |
| CF | 9 | Damien Duff |
Substitutions:
| FW | 17 | Niall Quinn | | (substituted on) 46' |
| MF | 7 | Jason McAteer | | (substituted on) 80' |
| MF | 22 | Lee Carsley | | (substituted on) 89' |
Manager:
Mick McCarthy

Man of the Match:
Damien Duff (Republic of Ireland)

Assistant referees:
Maciej Wierzbowski (Poland)
Frédéric Arnault (France)
Fourth official:
Lu Jun (China)

== See also ==
- Cameroon at the FIFA World Cup
- Germany at the FIFA World Cup
- Republic of Ireland at the FIFA World Cup
- Saudi Arabia at the FIFA World Cup
