= 1998 FIFA World Cup Group B =

Football tournament group stage

Group B of the 1998 FIFA World Cup was played from 11 to 23 June 1998. Italy finished clear winners of this group with seven points. Injury-time equalisers for Austria, first against Cameroon and then against Chile, meant that all three of these teams could still qualify with one match to go. Austria were then eliminated after losing their final game to Italy (despite scoring once again in injury-time). Chile conceded equalisers in all their games, but their three draws were enough for them to qualify in second place and advance with a record-low three points.

== Standings ==
Pos	Team	Pld	W	D	L	GF	GA	GD	Pts	Qualification
1	Italy	3	2	1	0	7	3	+4	7	Advance to knockout stage
2	Chile	3	0	3	0	4	4	0	3	Advance to knockout stage
3	Austria	3	0	2	1	3	4	−1	2	
4	Cameroon	3	0	2	1	2	5	−3	2	

Source: FIFA
- Italy advanced to play Norway (runner-up of Group A) in the round of 16.
- Chile advanced to play Brazil (winner of Group A) in the round of 16.

== Matches ==
=== Italy vs Chile ===
11 June 1998
17:30 CEST (UTC+2)

Italy	2–2	Chile
Vieri 10'; R. Baggio 84' (pen.)		Salas 45+3', 50'

Parc Lescure, Bordeaux
Attendance: 31,800
Referee: Lucien Bouchardeau (Niger)

Italy	Chile

GK	12	Gianluca Pagliuca
RB	5	Alessandro Costacurta
CB	6	Alessandro Nesta
CB	4	Fabio Cannavaro	(yellow card) 31'
LB	3	Paolo Maldini (c)
RM	15	Angelo Di Livio	(yellow card) 8'	(substituted off) 61'
CM	9	Demetrio Albertini
CM	16	Roberto Di Matteo		(substituted off) 57'
LM	11	Dino Baggio
SS	18	Roberto Baggio
CF	21	Christian Vieri		(substituted off) 71'
Substitutions:
CM	14	Luigi Di Biagio		(substituted on) 57'
FW	20	Enrico Chiesa		(substituted on) 61'
FW	19	Filippo Inzaghi		(substituted on) 71'
Manager:
Cesare Maldini

GK	1	Nelson Tapia
RWB	15	Moisés Villarroel
CB	3	Ronald Fuentes
CB	5	Javier Margas		(substituted off) 63'
CB	6	Pedro Reyes
LWB	4	Francisco Rojas	(yellow card) 66'
CM	7	Nelson Parraguez	(yellow card) 45'
CM	20	Fabián Estay		(substituted off) 81'
CM	8	Clarence Acuña	(yellow card) 53'	(substituted off) 82'
FW	9	Iván Zamorano (c)
FW	11	Marcelo Salas
Substitutions:
DF	14	Miguel Ramírez		(substituted on) 63'
MF	10	José Luis Sierra		(substituted on) 81'
MF	19	Fernando Cornejo		(substituted on) 82'
Manager:
(Uruguay) Nelson Acosta

Assistant referees:
Dramane Danté (Mali)
Mohamed Mansri (Tunisia)
Fourth official:
Marc Batta (France)

=== Cameroon vs Austria ===
11 June 1998
21:00 CEST (UTC+2)

Cameroon	1–1	Austria
Njanka 77'		Polster 90+1'

Stade de Toulouse, Toulouse
Attendance: 33,500
Referee: Epifanio González (Paraguay)

Cameroon	Austria

GK	1	Jacques Songo'o
CB	6	Pierre Njanka
CB	5	Raymond Kalla
CB	4	Rigobert Song
RWB	15	Joseph Ndo
LWB	3	Pierre Womé
CM	14	Augustine Simo		(substituted off) 65'
CM	10	Patrick Mboma
CM	8	Didier Angibeaud
CF	18	Samuel Ipoua	(yellow card) 30'	(substituted off) 65'
CF	7	François Omam-Biyik (c)		(substituted off) 84'
Substitutions:
MF	20	Salomon Olembé		(substituted on) 65'
FW	21	Joseph-Désiré Job		(substituted on) 65'
FW	9	Alphonse Tchami		(substituted on) 84'
Manager:
(France) Claude Le Roy

GK	1	Michael Konsel
CB	3	Peter Schöttel
CB	5	Wolfgang Feiersinger
CB	4	Anton Pfeffer	(yellow card) 27'
RM	13	Harald Cerny		(substituted off) 82'
LM	15	Arnold Wetl
CM	17	Roman Mählich
CM	22	Dietmar Kühbauer
CM	8	Heimo Pfeifenberger		(substituted off) 82'
SS	10	Andreas Herzog		(substituted off) 82'
CF	19	Toni Polster (c)
Substitutions:
FW	7	Mario Haas		(substituted on) 82'
FW	9	Ivica Vastić		(substituted on) 82'
MF	18	Peter Stöger		(substituted on) 82'
Manager:
Herbert Prohaska

Assistant referees:
Celestino Galván (Paraguay)
Reynaldo Salinas (Honduras)
Fourth official:
Arturo Brizio Carter (Mexico)

=== Chile vs Austria ===
17 June 1998
17:30 CEST (UTC+2)

Chile	1–1	Austria
Salas 70'		Vastić 90+2'

Stade Geoffroy-Guichard, Saint-Étienne
Attendance: 30,600
Referee: Gamal Al-Ghandour (Egypt)

Chile	Austria

GK	1	Nelson Tapia
RWB	15	Moisés Villarroel	(yellow card) 16'	(substituted off) 69'
CB	6	Pedro Reyes
CB	3	Ronald Fuentes
CB	5	Javier Margas
LWB	4	Francisco Rojas
MF	7	Nelson Parraguez
MF	8	Clarence Acuña
MF	20	Fabián Estay	(yellow card) 47'	(substituted off) 56'
FW	9	Iván Zamorano (c)	(yellow card) 74'
FW	11	Marcelo Salas	(yellow card) 58'
Substitutions:
MF	10	José Luis Sierra		(substituted on) 56'
DF	2	Cristián Castañeda		(substituted on) 69'
Manager:
(Uruguay) Nelson Acosta

GK	1	Michael Konsel
CB	5	Wolfgang Feiersinger
CB	3	Peter Schöttel	(yellow card) 26'
CB	4	Anton Pfeffer
RWB	13	Harald Cerny		(substituted off) 45'
MF	22	Dietmar Kühbauer		(substituted off) 45'
MF	17	Roman Mählich
MF	8	Heimo Pfeifenberger
LWB	15	Arnold Wetl
FW	7	Mario Haas		(substituted off) 73'
FW	19	Toni Polster (c)
Substitutions:
DF	2	Markus Schopp		(substituted on) 45'
MF	10	Andreas Herzog		(substituted on) 45'
FW	9	Ivica Vastić		(substituted on) 73'
Manager:
Herbert Prohaska

Assistant referees:
Hussain Ghadanfari (Kuwait)
Fernando Tresaco Gracia (Spain)
Fourth official:
Ali Bujsaim (United Arab Emirates)

=== Italy vs Cameroon ===
17 June 1998
21:00 CEST (UTC+2)

Italy	3–0	Cameroon
Di Biagio 7'; Vieri 75', 89'

Stade de la Mosson, Montpellier
Attendance: 29,800
Referee: Eddie Lennie (Australia)

Italy	Cameroon

GK	12	Gianluca Pagliuca
RB	5	Alessandro Costacurta	(yellow card) 26'
CB	6	Alessandro Nesta
CB	4	Fabio Cannavaro
LB	3	Paolo Maldini (c)
RM	17	Francesco Moriero		(substituted off) 83'
CM	9	Demetrio Albertini		(substituted off) 62'
CM	14	Luigi Di Biagio	(yellow card) 63'
LM	11	Dino Baggio
SS	18	Roberto Baggio		(substituted off) 65'
CF	21	Christian Vieri
Substitutions:
CM	16	Roberto Di Matteo		(substituted on) 62'
SS	10	Alessandro Del Piero		(substituted on) 65'
RM	15	Angelo Di Livio		(substituted on) 83'
Manager:
Cesare Maldini

GK	1	Jacques Songo'o
RB	3	Pierre Womé	(yellow card) 6'
CB	4	Rigobert Song	(yellow card) 85'
CB	5	Raymond Kalla	(red card) 42'
LB	6	Pierre Njanka	(yellow card) 16'
CM	15	Joseph Ndo
CM	8	Didier Angibeaud	(yellow card) 79'
CM	20	Salomon Olembé
FW	18	Samuel Ipoua		(substituted off) 45'
FW	7	François Omam-Biyik (c)		(substituted off) 66'
FW	10	Patrick Mboma		(substituted off) 66'
Substitutions:
FW	21	Joseph-Désiré Job		(substituted on) 45'
FW	9	Alphonse Tchami		(substituted on) 66'
FW	11	Samuel Eto'o		(substituted on) 66'
Manager:
(France) Claude Le Roy

Assistant referees:
Lencie Fred (Vanuatu)
Claudio Rossi (Argentina)
Fourth official:
Pirom Un-Prasert (Thailand)

=== Italy vs Austria ===
23 June 1998
16:00 CEST (UTC+2)

Italy	2–1	Austria
Vieri 48'; R. Baggio 90'		Herzog 90+2' (pen.)

Stade de France, Saint-Denis
Attendance: 80,000
Referee: Paul Durkin (England)

Italy	Austria

GK	12	Gianluca Pagliuca
RB	5	Alessandro Costacurta
CB	4	Fabio Cannavaro
CB	6	Alessandro Nesta		(substituted off) 4'
LB	3	Paolo Maldini (c)	(yellow card) 87'
RM	17	Francesco Moriero
CM	11	Dino Baggio
CM	14	Luigi Di Biagio
LM	7	Gianluca Pessotto
RF	10	Alessandro Del Piero		(substituted off) 72'
LF	21	Christian Vieri		(substituted off) 60'
Substitutions:
RB	2	Giuseppe Bergomi		(substituted on) 4'
RF	19	Filippo Inzaghi		(substituted on) 60'
LF	18	Roberto Baggio		(substituted on) 72'
Manager:
Cesare Maldini

GK	1	Michael Konsel
DF	3	Peter Schöttel	(yellow card) 43'
DF	4	Anton Pfeffer
DF	5	Wolfgang Feiersinger	(yellow card) 3'
RWB	17	Roman Mählich
CM	8	Heimo Pfeifenberger		(substituted off) 80'
CM	14	Hannes Reinmayr	(yellow card) 88'
CM	22	Dietmar Kühbauer		(substituted off) 74'
LWB	15	Arnold Wetl
FW	9	Ivica Vastić	(yellow card) 35'
FW	19	Toni Polster (c)		(substituted off) 62'
Substitutions:
FW	7	Mario Haas		(substituted on) 62'
MF	18	Peter Stöger		(substituted on) 74'
MF	10	Andreas Herzog		(substituted on) 80'
Manager:
Herbert Prohaska

Assistant referees:
Mark Warren (England)
Jeon Young-Hyun (South Korea)
Fourth official:
Lim Kee Chong (Mauritius)

=== Chile vs Cameroon ===
23 June 1998
16:00 CEST (UTC+2)

Chile	1–1	Cameroon
Sierra 20'		Mboma 56'

Stade de la Beaujoire, Nantes
Attendance: 35,500
Referee: László Vágner (Hungary)

Chile	Cameroon

GK	1	Nelson Tapia
DF	3	Ronald Fuentes
DF	4	Francisco Rojas	(yellow card) 55'	(substituted off) 77'
DF	5	Javier Margas
DF	6	Pedro Reyes
MF	7	Nelson Parraguez	(yellow card) 50'
MF	8	Clarence Acuña
FW	9	Iván Zamorano (c)
MF	10	José Luis Sierra		(substituted off) 70'
FW	11	Marcelo Salas
DF	15	Moisés Villarroel	(yellow card) 66'	(substituted off) 70'
Substitutions:
MF	19	Fernando Cornejo		(substituted on) 70'
MF	20	Fabián Estay		(substituted on) 70'
DF	14	Miguel Ramírez	(yellow card) 89'	(substituted on) 77'
Manager:
(Uruguay) Nelson Acosta

GK	1	Jacques Songo'o
RB	3	Pierre Womé
CB	4	Rigobert Song	(yellow card) 8' (red card) 51'
CB	17	Michel Pensée
LB	6	Pierre Njanka
RM	19	Marcel Mahouvé
CM	15	Joseph Ndo		(substituted off) 82'
CM	20	Salomon Olembé		(substituted off) 68'
LM	21	Joseph-Désiré Job		(substituted off) 72'
FW	7	François Omam-Biyik (c)
FW	10	Patrick Mboma
Substitutions:
MF	8	Didier Angibeaud		(substituted on) 68'
FW	9	Alphonse Tchami		(substituted on) 72'
DF	12	Lauren	(red card) 88'	(substituted on) 82'
Manager:
(France) Claude Le Roy

Assistant referees:
Nimal Wickramatunge (Sri Lanka)
Halim Abdul Hamid (Malaysia)
Fourth official:
José María García-Aranda (Spain)

== See also ==
- Austria at the FIFA World Cup
- Cameroon at the FIFA World Cup
- Chile at the FIFA World Cup
- Italy at the FIFA World Cup
