= Bonaventure Djonkep =

Cameroonian footballer (born 1961)

Personal information
- Date of birth: 20 August 1961 (age 65)
- Place of birth: Bafang, Cameroon
- Height: 1.76 m (5 ft 9 in)
- Position: Forward

Senior career*
Years	Team	Apps	(Gls)
1982–1995	Union Douala		

International career
- Cameroon U20
1981–1990	Cameroon	52	(10)

Managerial career
- 2002–2003: Cotonsport Garoua
- 2011–2013: Union Douala
- 2013–: New Star Douala
Medal record
Men's football
Representing Cameroon
Africa Cup of Nations
Winner	1984 Ivory Coast
Winner	1988 Morocco
- * Club domestic league appearances and goals

Bonaventure Djonkep (born 20 August 1961) is a Cameroonian football coach and former player.

== Career ==
Djonkep spent his entire playing career between the 1982 and 1995 at Union Douala, winning one Cameroonian League title in 1990 and one Cameroonian Cup in 1985.

Internationally Djonkep first played for Cameroon U20 at the 1981 FIFA World Youth Championship, appearing in all three of their group matches and scoring two goals against Australia U20.

As a full international he appeared in two qualifying matches for the 1986 FIFA World Cup against Zambia in April 1985. He then played for Cameroon in the 1987 All-Africa Games and in the 1988 African Cup of Nations.

He was called up by coach Valeri Nepomniachi to the Cameroon squad which participated the 1990 FIFA World Cup. Djonkep was unused in the group stage but did appear in their round of 16 match against Colombia, coming on in the 69th minute as a substitute for Cyrille Makanaky. Cameroon won in extra time through two goals by Roger Milla and were knocked out in the quarter-finals by England.

After retiring from playing Djonkep worked as a coach. Between 2002 and 2003 he coached Cotonsport Garoua, and later had a spell with Union Douala. He managed Union Douala to win the league title in the 2011–12 season.

== Honours ==
Cameroon

- African Cup of Nations: 1984, 1988
