= Louis-Paul M'Fédé =

Cameroonian footballer (1961–2013)

Personal information
- Date of birth: 26 February 1961
- Place of birth: Yaoundé, Cameroon
- Date of death: 10 June 2013 (aged 52)
- Place of death: Yaoundé, Cameroon
- Height: 1.77 m (5 ft 10 in)
- Position: Midfielder

Senior career*
Years	Team	Apps	(Gls)
1981–1983	Canon Yaoundé		
1983–1987	Rennes	78	(8)
1988–1990	Canon Yaoundé		
1990–1991	→ Figueres	23	(1)
1991–1994	Canon Yaoundé		
1995–1996	Persegres Gresik		

International career
1984–1994	Cameroon	66	(8)
Medal record
Men's football
Representing Cameroon
Africa Cup of Nations
Winner	1988 Morocco
Runner-up	1986 Egypt
Afro-Asian Cup of Nations
Winner	1985 Cameroon
- * Club domestic league appearances and goals

Louis-Paul M'Fédé (26 February 1961 – 10 June 2013) was a Cameroonian professional footballer who played as a midfielder. He spent his playing career with Cameroonian side Canon Yaoundé and Olympic Mvolyé, and Stade Rennais of France. At international level, he played at the 1984 Summer Olympics in Los Angeles and two FIFA World Cup in 1990 and 1994. He also took part at the 1988, 1990 and 1992 African Cups of Nations.

M'Fédé died of a lung infection on 10 June 2013.

== Honours ==
Canon Yaoundé

- Cameroonian championship: 1982, 1992

Cameroon

- African Cup of Nations: 1988; runner-up, 1986
- Afro-Asian Cup of Nations: 1985
