= Eugène Ekéké =

Cameroonian footballer (born 1960)

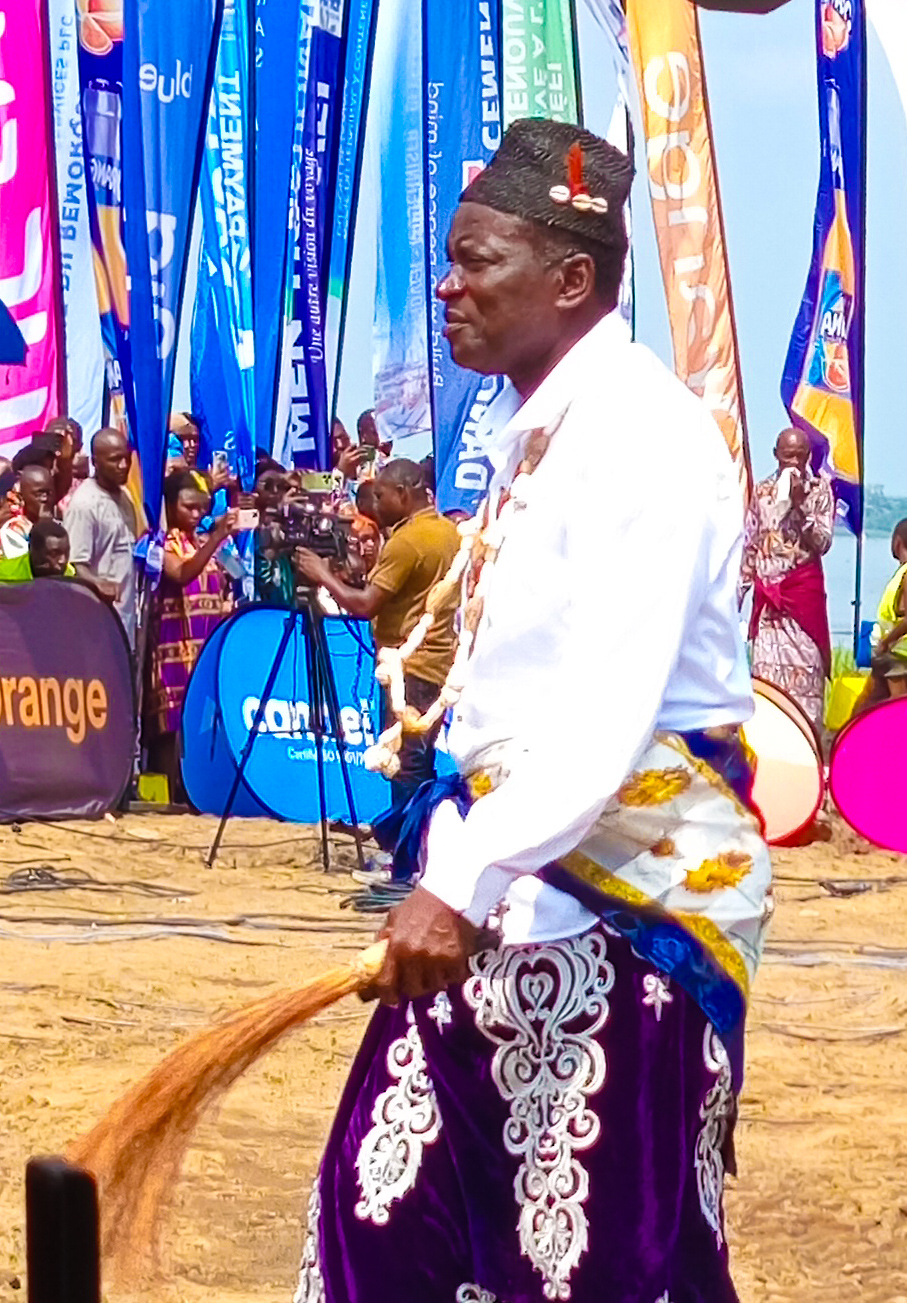

Personal information
- Full name: Ebelle Ferdinand Ekéké
- Date of birth: 30 May 1960 (age 66)
- Place of birth: Bonabéri, Cameroon
- Height: 1.82 m (6 ft 0 in)
- Position: Forward

Senior career*
Years	Team	Apps	(Gls)
1982–1986	Racing Paris	55	(25)
1986–1987	Beveren	16	(1)
1987–1989	Quimper	45	(10)
1989–1992	Valenciennes	91	(15)
1992–1997	US Maubeuge	41	(1)
Total		248	(52)

International career
1980–1992	Cameroon	16	(2)
Medal record
Men's football
Representing Cameroon
Africa Cup of Nations
Winner	1988 Morocco
- * Club domestic league appearances and goals

Ebelle "Eugène" Ferdinand Ekéké (born 30 May 1960) is a Cameroonian former professional footballer who played as a forward. He appeared for the Cameroon national team at the 1990 World Cup in Italy. He famously scored to give Cameroon the lead against England in the quarter-finals, before eventually losing 3–2.

Born in Bonabéri, Cameroon, Ekéké played most of his club football in France, at RC Paris from 1982 to 1986, during which period he played for Cameroon in the 1984 Olympic Football competition, alongside many of the team who would later play so well at the World Cup six years later. Ekéké spent the 1986–87 season at K.S.K. Beveren, in Belgium, before returning to France to Quimper for a couple of seasons, before his move to Valenciennes FC, for whom he was playing when he was called up for the 1990 World Cup.

After he retired from playing, Ekéké established a football academy in Douala and was appointed president of l’Union Camerounais des clubs amateurs de football (UCCAF). Ekéké is now based in Douala, occasionally commenting on matters regarding the Indomitable Lions in the local media.

== Honours ==
Cameroon

- African Cup of Nations: 1988
