= Alphonse Yombi =

Cameroonian footballer

Personal information
- Full name: Ayakan Alphonse Yombi
- Date of birth: June 30, 1969 (age 57)
- Place of birth: Yaoundé, Cameroon
- Height: 1.74 m (5 ft 9 in)
- Position: Defender

Senior career*
Years	Team	Apps	(Gls)
1990	Canon Yaounde		
1994	Olympic Mvolyé		
- Vejle BK
- Iraklis

International career
1990s	Cameroon	38	
- * Club domestic league appearances and goals

Ayakan Alphonse Yombi (born June 30, 1969) is a Cameroonian former footballer. He was a member of the Cameroon squad at the 1990 World Cup in Italy. As a professional, he played among others in his home at Canon Yaounde and Olympic Mvolyé, and in Europe at Vejle BK in Denmark and Iraklis in Greece.
