= Roger Feutmba =

Cameroonian footballer

Personal information
- Date of birth: 31 October 1968 (age 58)
- Place of birth: Douala, Cameroon
- Height: 1.84 m (6 ft 0 in)
- Position: Midfielder

Senior career*
Years	Team	Apps	(Gls)
1986–1991	Union Douala		
1991–1996	K.V. Kortrijk	56	(3)
1996–1999	Mamelodi Sundowns		

International career
- Cameroon
- * Club domestic league appearances and goals

Roger Feutmba (born 31 October 1968) is a Cameroonian former professional footballer who played as a midfielder. He was named in the Cameroon national team's squads for the 1990 FIFA World Cup, the 1990 African Nations Cup and the 1992 African Nations Cup.

During his time at Mamelodi Sundowns Feutmba won the PSL Players' Player of the Season award.
