= Emmanuel Kundé =

Cameroonian footballer (1956–2025)

- Kundé in the 1990 World Cup

Personal information
- Full name: Emmanuel Jérôme Kundé
- Date of birth: 15 July 1956
- Place of birth: Ndom, French Cameroon
- Date of death: 16 May 2025 (aged 68)
- Height: 1.86 m (6 ft 1 in)
- Position: Defender

Senior career*
Years	Team	Apps	(Gls)
1973–1975	Mbankomo Club		
1975–1977	Tempête de Nanga-Eboko		
1977–1987	Canon Yaoundé		
1987–1988	Laval	14	(0)
1988–1989	Reims	32	(3)
1989–1990	Prévoyance Yaoundé		
1991–1992	Olympic Mvolyé		

International career
1979–1992	Cameroon	102	(17)

Managerial career
- 1997–1998: Canon Yaoundé
- 1999–2000: US Bitam
- 2000: PWD Bamenda
- 2001–2006: US Bitam
- Hemle Football Club De Botko
Medal record
Men's football
Representing Cameroon
Africa Cup of Nations
Winner	1984 Ivory Coast
Winner	1988 Morocco
Runner-up	1986 Egypt
Afro-Asian Cup of Nations
Winner	1985 Cameroon
- * Club domestic league appearances and goals

Emmanuel Jérôme Kundé (15 July 1956 – 16 May 2025) was a Cameroonian professional footballer who played as a defender. He spent the majority of his professional career playing for Canon Yaoundé. He was also a member of the Cameroon national team at the World Cups of 1982 and 1990 and won the 1984 and 1988 African Nations Cups.

Kundé scored the winning goal in the 1988 African Nations Cup final against Nigeria with a penalty kick. Two years later, in the 1990 World Cup quarterfinal match against England, he scored to equalize the score 1–1, again via a penalty kick. He also took part in 1992 African Nations Cup while playing for Olympic Mvolyé.

== Early life and club career ==
Kundé was born in Ndom, French Cameroon on 15 July 1956. He began his football career with Mbankomo Club (1973–1975), followed by a stint at Tempête de Nanga-Eboko (1975–1977). He later joined Canon Yaoundé, where he played from 1977 to 1987. While at the club, he won several domestic championships and was part of the team that reached the final of the African Cup Winners' Cup in 1984.

== International career ==
Kundé was a member of the Cameroon national team, earning 102 international caps and scoring 17 goals between 1979 and 1992. He participated in three editions of the African Nations Cups, winning the tournament in 1984 and 1988, and finishing as runner-up in 1986.

He also featured in the 1982 and 1990 FIFA World Cups. At the 1990 tournament, he notably scored a penalty in the quarter-final against England.

== Coaching career ==
Following his retirement from professional football, Kundé transitioned into coaching. He managed several Cameroonian clubs, including Canon Yaoundé and Union Douala, and has held various technical positions within the national team structure.

== Death ==
Kundé died from cardiac arrest at his residence, on 16 May 2025, at the age of 68. His death was confirmed by the Cameroonian Football Federation, which described it as a significant loss for Cameroonian football.

== Honours ==
Cameroon

- African Cup of Nations: 1984, 1988; runner-up, 1986
- Afro-Asian Cup of Nations: 1985
- Central African Games: 1987

== See also ==
- List of men's footballers with 100 or more international caps
