= Hans Agbo =

Cameroonian footballer and coach (born 1967)

Personal information
- Date of birth: 26 September 1967 (age 59)
- Place of birth: Douala, Cameroon
- Height: 1.68 m (5 ft 6 in)
- Position: Defender

Team information
- Current team: MC Oran (assistant coach)

Senior career*
Years	Team	Apps	(Gls)
1989–1992	Prévoyance Yaoundé		
1993–1997	Olympic Mvolyé		
2001–2003	Tonnerre Yaoundé		

International career
1988–1996	Cameroon	49	(1)
- * Club domestic league appearances and goals

Hans Agbo (born 26 September 1967) is a Cameroonian football coach and former international player who is the assistant coach of Algerian club MC Oran.

== Career ==
Agbo, a defender, played club football in Cameroon for Prévoyance Yaoundé, Olympic Mvolyé and Tonnerre Yaoundé.

Agbo represented Cameroon at the 1994 FIFA World Cup, making three appearances in the tournament. He also played at the 1992 African Cup of Nations and the 1996 African Cup of Nations.

Agbo became the assistant coach of Algerian Ligue Professionnelle 1 club MC Oran in July 2012.
