= Hernán Silva =

Chilean football referee (1948–2017)

Hernán Silva Arce
- Full name: Hernán Silva Arce
- Born: 5 November 1948; Chile
- Died: 15 October 2017 (aged 68)

Domestic
Years	League	Role

International
Years	League	Role
1986–1990	FIFA listed	Referee

Hernán Silva Arce (November 5, 1948 – October 15, 2017) was a Chilean football referee. He is known for having refereed two matches in the FIFA World Cup, one in 1986 (between Canada and France) and one in the 1990 edition (between Cameroon and Romania). He died October 15, 2017.
