= Benjamin Massing =

Cameroonian footballer (1962–2017)

Personal information
- Full name: Benjamin Roger Massing
- Date of birth: 20 June 1962
- Place of birth: Edéa, Cameroon
- Date of death: 9 December 2017 (aged 55)
- Place of death: Edéa, Cameroon
- Height: 1.83 m (6 ft 0 in)
- Position: Centre-back

Senior career*
Years	Team	Apps	(Gls)
1986–1987	Diamant Yaoundé		
1987–1991	Créteil	41	(3)
1991–1992	Olympic Mvolyé		

International career
1987–1992	Cameroon	21	(1)
Medal record
Men's football
Representing Cameroon
Africa Cup of Nations
Winner	1988 Morocco
- * Club domestic league appearances and goals

Benjamin Roger Massing (20 June 1962 – 9 December 2017) was a Cameroonian professional footballer who played as a central defender for Diamant Yaoundé, Créteil in France, and Olympic Mvolyé. At international level, he played for the Cameroon national team which he represented at the 1990 FIFA World Cup.

== Career ==
=== Diamant Yaoundé ===
Massing started his professional career with Diamant Yaoundé, a Cameroonian football club based in the country's capital, and finished the 1986–1987 football season with the team.

=== US Créteil ===
In the 1987–88 season, Massing signed for French club US Créteil from where he was picked up for Cameroon's squad for the 1990 FIFA World Cup. Massing was sent off in the opening game for a foul on Argentina's Claudio Caniggia, in a 1–0 shock win for Cameroon.

Massing also appeared in the quarter-final loss to England (2–3) where he was booked, conceding a penalty for committing a foul on Gary Lineker.

Massing earned 21 international caps and also took part in three Africa Cup of Nations, including the 1992 edition while playing for Olympic Mvolyé between 1992 and 1993.

== Death ==
On 9 December 2017, Massing died in Edéa, Cameroon at the age of 55.

== Honours ==
Cameroon

- African Cup of Nations: 1988
