= Bertin Ebwellé =

Cameroonian footballer

Personal information
- Full name: Bertin Ebwellé Ndingué
- Date of birth: 11 September 1962 (age 64)
- Place of birth: Yaoundé, Cameroon
- Position: Left back

Senior career*
| Years | Team | Apps | (Gls) |
| 1985–1990 | Tonnerre Yaoundé | | |
| 1991–1992 | Putra Samarinda | | |
| 1992 | Olympic Mvolyé | | |
| 1995–1996 | Canon Yaoundé | | |
| 1996–1998 | Putra Samarinda | | |

International career
| 1987–1992 | Cameroon | 47 | (3) |

Managerial career
- 2005: Tonnerre Yaoundé
Medal record
Men's football
Representing Cameroon
Africa Cup of Nations
| Winner | 1988 Morocco |
| Runner-up | 1986 Egypt |
- * Club domestic league appearances and goals

Bertin Ebwellé Ndingué (born 11 September 1962) is a Cameroonian retired professional football player and coach.

== Playing career ==
Born in Yaoundé, Ebwellé played for Tonnerre Yaoundé, Putra Samarinda, Olympic Mvolyé and Canon Yaoundé.

He also represented Cameroon at the 1986 African Cup of Nations, 1988 African Cup of Nations, 1990 African Cup of Nations, 1990 FIFA World Cup, 1992 African Nations Cup and 1996 African Nations Cup.

== Coaching career ==
He coached Tonnerre Yaoundé.

== Honours ==
Cameroon

- African Cup of Nations: 1988; runner-up, 1986
