= Bill Tchato =

Cameroonian footballer (born 1975)

Personal information
- Full name: Bill Jackson Tchato Mbiayi
- Date of birth: 14 May 1975 (age 51)
- Place of birth: M'Biam, Cameroon
- Height: 1.76 m (5 ft 9 in)
- Position: Defender

Senior career*
Years	Team	Apps	(Gls)
1995–1996	Caen	18	(0)
1996–1998	Valence	69	(6)
1998–2000	Nice	70	(3)
2000–2003	Montpellier	63	(0)
2003–2005	1. FC Kaiserslautern	55	(1)
2005–2006	Nice	24	(0)
2006–2008	Qatar SC	13	(0)
2008–2010	Al-Khor	18	(0)
2010–2011	Strasbourg	19	(1)
2011–2012	Sapins		

International career
2000–2008	Cameroon	46	(2)
Medal record
Men's football
Representing Cameroon
Africa Cup of Nations
Winner	2000 Ghana-Nigeria
Runner-up	2008 Ghana
FIFA Confederations Cup
Runner-up	2003 France
- * Club domestic league appearances and goals

Bill Jackson Tchato Mbiayi (born 14 May 1975) is a Cameroonian former professional footballer who played as a defender. He played for Caen, Valence, Nice, Montpellier, 1. FC Kaiserslautern, Qatar SC, Al-Khor and Strasbourg and Sapins. Tchato represented Cameroon at international level, making 46 appearances over an eight-year period, scoring one goal.

== Club career ==
Tchato began his career in France with Caen in 1995, and made 18 league appearances in his debut season which ended with the club being promoted to Division 1 as champions. He was transferred to Valence in 1996, where he made 69 league appearances and scored six goals over the next two years. In 1998, he joined OGC Nice, scoring three goals in 70 league appearances during his time with the club. Tchato was signed by Montpellier in 2000 and he helped them gain promotion to Division 1 in his first season. He made 63 league appearances for the club before moving to Germany in 2003 to play for Bundesliga side FC Kaiserslautern. In 2005, he returned to Nice for one season and then moved to the Middle East to play for Qatar SC. Two years later, he joined Al-Khor. Tchato returned to France in 2010 with Championnat National team Strasbourg. A year later, having seen Strasbourg relegated due to financial problems, Tchato moved to Gabon to join First Division club Sapins.

== International career ==
He made his debut for the Cameroon national team in 2000. He represented his country at the 2002 FIFA World Cup, and the African Cup of Nations in the same year, which Cameroon won. Tchato appeared in two FIFA Confederations Cup competitions, in 2001 and 2003. He also played in the 2004 and 2008 African Cup of Nations, where Cameroon were defeated by Egypt in the final.

== Personal life ==
Born in M'Biam, Tchato moved to Europe at a young age with his parents, who worked for the Embassy of Cameroon in Paris, and subsequently in London. He acquired French nationality by naturalization on 9 December 1998.

Bill's son Enzo is also a professional footballer, and plays for Montpellier.

== Honours ==
Cameroon

- African Cup of Nations: 2000; runner-up, 2008
- FIFA Confederations Cup: runner up, 2003
