= Alioum Boukar =

Cameroonian footballer (born 1972)

Personal information
- Date of birth: 3 January 1972 (age 54)
- Place of birth: Yaoundé, Cameroon
- Height: 1.83 m (6 ft 0 in)
- Position: Goalkeeper

Senior career*
Years	Team	Apps	(Gls)
1992–1995	Canon Yaoundé		
1995–2002	Samsunspor	163	(0)
2002–2003	İstanbulspor	14	(0)
2003–2004	Konyaspor	24	(0)
2005	Samsunspor	10	(0)
2006–2007	Altay	20	(0)
2008–2010	İstanbulspor	63	(0)
Total		294	(0)

International career
1992–2004	Cameroon	52	(0)
Medal record
Men's football
Representing Cameroon
Africa Cup of Nations
Winner	2000 Ghana-Nigeria
Winner	2002 Mali
- * Club domestic league appearances and goals

Alioum Boukar (born 3 January 1972) is a Cameroonian former professional footballer who played as a goalkeeper for several Turkish clubs, including Samsunspor and İstanbulspor. He played for Cameroon national team and was a participant at the 1998 FIFA World Cup and the 2002 FIFA World Cup. He was also part of the victorious 2000 and 2002 African Cup of Nations squads.

He acquired Turkish citizenship and changed his name to Ali Uyanık.

== Honours ==
Cameroon

- African Cup of Nations: 2000, 2002
