= Fouzi Al-Shehri =

Saudi Arabian footballer

Personal information
- Full name: Fouzi Al-Shehri
- Date of birth: 15 May 1980 (age 46)
- Place of birth: Jeddah, Saudi Arabia
- Position: Defender

Senior career*
Years	Team	Apps	(Gls)
1998–2000	Al-Qadisiyah FC		
2001–2007	Al-Ahli		

International career
2000–2002	Saudi Arabia	6	(0)
- * Club domestic league appearances and goals

Fouzi Al-Shehri (Arabic: فوزي الشهري; born 15 May 1980) is a Saudi Arabian former football player.

He played most of his career for Al Ahli, though some of his career was with Al-Qadisiyah FC.

He played for the Saudi Arabia national football team and was a participant at the 2002 FIFA World Cup.
