= Jean-Claude Pagal =

Cameroonian footballer

Personal information
- Date of birth: September 15, 1964 (age 62)
- Place of birth: Yaoundé, Cameroon
- Height: 1.81 m (5 ft 11 in)
- Position: Defender

Senior career*
Years	Team	Apps	(Gls)
1982–1989	RC Lens	119	(4)
1989–1990	La Roche	26	(0)
1990–1993	AS Saint-Étienne	53	(4)
1993–1994	FC Martigues	27	(1)
1994–1995	Club América	11	(0)
1995–1996	R.F.C. Seraing	7	(1)
1997–1998	Carlisle United	1	(0)
1998	Chengdu Wuniu		
2000–2001	Sliema Wanderers		
2008–2009	Tiko United		

International career
1990–1992	Cameroon	17	(1)
- * Club domestic league appearances and goals

Jean-Claude Pagal (born September 15, 1964 in Yaoundé, Cameroon) is a former Cameroonian footballer.

== Professional career ==
Pagal played 206 games in his professional career which includes stint at clubs like RC Lens , AS Saint-Étienne, Martigues and RFC Liège.

== Career statistics ==
=== International goals ===
#	Date	Venue	Opponent	Score	Result	Competition
1.	11 July 1992	FNB Stadium, Johannesburg, South Africa	South Africa	2–2	Draw	Friendly
Correct as of 13 January 2017
