= Victor N'Dip =

Cameroonian footballer

Personal information
- Full name: Victor N'Dip Akem
- Date of birth: 18 August 1967 (age 59)
- Place of birth: Cameroon
- Height: 1.75 m (5 ft 9 in)
- Position: Defender

Senior career*
Years	Team	Apps	(Gls)
1989–1990	Canon Yaoundé		
1993–1994	Olympic Mvolyé		

International career
1985–1994	Cameroon	54	(0)
Medal record
Men's football
Representing Cameroon
Africa Cup of Nations
Winner	1988 Morocco
Runner-up	1986 Egypt
Afro-Asian Cup of Nations
Winner	1985 Cameroon
- * Club domestic league appearances and goals

Victor N'Dip Akem (born 18 August 1967) is a Cameroonian retired footballer who played as a defender.

== Career ==
Among the clubs he played for included Canon Yaoundé and Olympic Mvolyé. He also participated at the 1990 FIFA World Cup and 1994 FIFA World Cup with the Cameroon national football team.

== Career statistics ==
=== International ===
Appearances and goals by national team and year
National team	Year	Apps	Goals
Cameroon	1985	2	0
Cameroon	1986	9	0
Cameroon	1987	5	0
Cameroon	1988	1	0
Cameroon	1989	1	0
Cameroon	1990	8	0
Cameroon	1991	4	0
Cameroon	1992	9	0
Cameroon	1993	9	0
Cameroon	1994	6	0
Total		54	0

== Honours ==
Cameroon

- African Cup of Nations: 1988; runner-up, 1986
- Afro-Asian Cup of Nations: 1985
