= Didier Angibeaud =

Cameroonian footballer (born 1974)

Personal information
- Full name: Didier Angibeaud-Nguidjol
- Date of birth: 8 October 1974 (age 52)
- Place of birth: Douala, Cameroon
- Height: 1.83 m (6 ft 0 in)
- Position: Midfielder

Senior career*
Years	Team	Apps	(Gls)
1991–1995	Le Havre	17	(0)
1995–1996	Istres	27	(7)
1996–1997	Toulon	28	(3)
1997–1998	Nice	28	(1)
1998–2001	Sturm Graz	22	(1)
Total		122	(12)

International career
1998	Cameroon	6	(0)
- * Club domestic league appearances and goals

Didier Angibeaud-Nguidjol (born 8 October 1974) is a Cameroonian former professional footballer played as a midfielder.

He played for Le Havre, FC Istres, Toulon and OGC Nice in France (Note: Didier Angibeaud – French league stats at LFP – also available in French (archived)) and also for Sturm Graz in Austria.

He played for Cameroon national football team and was a participant at the 1998 FIFA World Cup.
