= Aleksandr Uvarov (footballer) =

Russian and Israeli footballer

Aleksandr Uvarov Александр Уваров
Personal information
- Full name: Aleksandr Viktorovich Uvarov
- Date of birth: 13 January 1960 (age 66)
- Place of birth: Orekhovo-Zuyevo, Russian SFSR
- Height: 1.90 m (6 ft 3 in)
- Position: Goalkeeper

Senior career*
Years	Team	Apps	(Gls)
1981–1991	Dynamo Moscow	105	(0)
1991–2000	Maccabi Tel Aviv	220	(0)
Total		325	(0)

International career
1990–1991	USSR	11	(0)

Managerial career
- 2000–2018: Maccabi Tel Aviv (goalkeeping coach)
- 2000–2012: Israel (goalkeeping coach)
- 2018–: Maccabi Tel Aviv U19 (goalkeeping coach)
- * Club domestic league appearances and goals

Aleksandr Viktorovich Uvarov (Russian: Александр Викторович Уваров; born 13 January 1960) is a Russian and Israeli (since 2003) former football player. He is current goalkeeping coach of Maccabi Tel Aviv.

== Career ==
During his club career he played for FC Dynamo Moscow and Maccabi Tel Aviv He earned 11 caps for the USSR national football team, and participated in the 1990 FIFA World Cup, playing matches against Argentina and Cameroon. He lost his wife due to medical complications in May 2021, whilst she was visiting her family in Moscow, Russia. He is the current youth coach at Maccabi Tel Aviv and lives in Israel with his two children.

== Honours ==
=== Player ===
==== Dynamo Moscow ====
- Soviet Cup (1):
  - 1984

==== Maccabi Tel Aviv ====
- Israeli Premier League (3):
  - 1991/92, 1994/95, 1995/96
- State Cup (2):
  - 1993/94, 1995/96
- Toto Cup (2):
  - 1992/93, 1998/99
