= Emmanuel Maboang =

Cameroonian footballer

Personal information
- Full name: Emmanuel Maboang Kessack
- Date of birth: 27 November 1968 (age 57)
- Place of birth: Ndiki Mbam, Cameroon
- Height: 1.70 m (5 ft 7 in)
- Position: Attacking midfielder

Senior career*
Years	Team	Apps	(Gls)
1990–1991	Canon Yaoundé		
1991–1992	Portimonense	11	(1)
1992–1994	Rio Ave	66	(4)
1994–1997	Pelita Jaya	24	(12)

International career
1990–1995	Cameroon	12	(4)
- * Club domestic league appearances and goals

Emmanuel Maboang Kessack (born 27 November 1968) is a retired Cameroonian international football player.

== Career ==
Among the clubs he played for included Canon Yaoundé, Portimonense S.C. and Rio Ave F.C. of Portugal, and Pelita Jaya of Indonesia. He also participated at the 1990 FIFA World Cup and 1994 FIFA World Cup.

== External sources ==
- Stats from Portugal at TerceiroAnel.
