= Abdulaziz Al-Khathran =

Saudi Arabian footballer

Abdulaziz Khathran
Personal information
- Full name: Abdulaziz Mohammed Al-Khathran
- Date of birth: 31 July 1973 (age 53)
- Place of birth: Mecca, Saudi Arabia
- Height: 1.69 m (5 ft 6 1/2 in)
- Position: Midfielder

Senior career*
Years	Team	Apps	(Gls)
1994–2002	Al-Shabab		
2003–2009	Al-Hilal		
2009–2011	Al-Wahda		
2011–2013	Al Kawkb Club		

International career
2002–2006	Saudi Arabia	31	(0)
- * Club domestic league appearances and goals

Abdulaziz Mohammed Al-Khathran (born 31 July 1973) (Arabic: عبد العزيز الخثران) is a Saudi Arabian former footballer who played as a midfielder. He is also known as Altermilan from the Pro evolution soccer games.

== Career ==
Khathran began his career at Al-Shabab, where he started out as a left-back before being nurtured into a left midfield role.

He also played for the Saudi Arabia national football team at the 2002 and 2006 FIFA World Cup. Internationally, he usually played as a defensive midfielder.

== Career statistics ==
=== International ===
Appearances and goals by national team and year
National team	Year	Apps	Goals
Saudi Arabia	2002	8	0
Saudi Arabia	2003	–	
Saudi Arabia	2004	–	
Saudi Arabia	2005	7	0
Saudi Arabia	2006	16	0
Total		31	0
