= Jules Onana =

Cameroonian footballer

Personal information
- Full name: Jules-Denis Onana
- Date of birth: 12 June 1964 (age 62)
- Place of birth: Yaoundé, Cameroon
- Height: 1.84 m (6 ft 0 in)
- Position: Defender

Senior career*
Years	Team	Apps	(Gls)
1988–1994	Canon Yaoundé		
1995	Aigle Nkongsamba		
1996	Blagnac FC	7	(1)
1997-2000	Persma Manado		
2001	Persis Solo		
2002	Pelita Krakatau Steel	19	(3)

International career
1988–1995	Cameroon	42	(0)
- * Club domestic league appearances and goals

Jules Denis Onana (born 12 June 1964 in Yaoundé) is a retired Cameroonian football player. He is the brother of Elie Onana. He played for the club Canon Yaounde, and also took part in the 1990 FIFA World Cup, playing 3 of the 5 matches of the Cameroon national football team. He decided to retire in 2005 after he played in several clubs in Cameroon, France and Indonesia with Pelita Jaya. After retirement, he served as the player agent in Asian countries. He had 56 caps for Cameroon national football team.

== Honour ==
=== Canon Yaounde ===
- Cameroonian Championship: 1 (1991)
- Cameroonian Cup: 1 (1993)
