= Thomas Libiih =

Cameroonian footballer

Personal information
- Date of birth: 17 November 1967 (age 58)
- Place of birth: Douala, Cameroon
- Position: Midfielder

Senior career*
Years	Team	Apps	(Gls)
1989–1992	Tonnerre Yaoundé		
1993–1995	Ohud Medina		
2001	LDU Portoviejo		

International career
1989–1994	Cameroon		

Managerial career
- 2009–: FC Lotus-Terek Yaoundé
- * Club domestic league appearances and goals

Thomas Libiih (born 17 November 1967) is a Cameroonian former footballer who played as a midfielder. He played for various clubs, including Tonnerre Yaoundé and Ohud Medina. He also participated in the 1990 and 1994 FIFA World Cups with the Cameroon national football team.

Libiih had a brief spell with LDU Portoviejo in Ecuador.

He works as a coach at FC Lotus-Terek Yaoundé, a Cameroonian farm team of Russian FC Terek Grozny, created by Guy Stephane Essame.
