= Raymond Kalla =

Cameroonian footballer (born 1975)

Personal information
- Full name: Raymond Koned Kalla Nkongo
- Date of birth: 22 April 1975 (age 51)
- Place of birth: Douala, Cameroon
- Height: 1.90 m (6 ft 3 in)
- Position: Centre back

Senior career*
Years	Team	Apps	(Gls)
1993–1995	Canon Yaoundé		
1995–1998	Panachaiki	71	(3)
1998–2002	Extremadura	121	(1)
2002–2005	VfL Bochum	77	(6)
2005–2006	Sivasspor	26	(0)
2006–2008	Union Douala		
Total		295	(10)

International career
1994–2006	Cameroon	83	(2)
Medal record
Representing Cameroon
Africa Cup of Nations
Winner	2000 Ghana-Nigeria
Winner	2002 Mali
- * Club domestic league appearances and goals

Raymond Koned Kalla Nkongo (born 22 April 1975), known as Kalla, is a Cameroonian former professional footballer who played as a central defender.

His main asset was a powerful physique, and he had already been picked by the Cameroonian national team for three World Cups – and started – in his mid-20s.

== Club career ==
Kalla was born in Douala. After starting professionally at Canon Sportif de Yaoundé, he went on to play in four countries: first Panachaiki F.C. in Greece then Spain's CF Extremadura, where he competed in both major divisions.

In 2002, after Extremadura dropped another category to the third level, Kalla signed with VfL Bochum in Germany– he scored five times in his last season, second-best in the squad – but the club was relegated from the Bundesliga. He also received a three-match ban for anti-doping rules breaching, in late 2003.

Subsequently, Kalla joined Turkish side Sivasspor for the 2005–06 campaign, returning home for two final years at Union Douala and retiring at age 33.

== International career ==
Kalla won 63 caps for Cameroon, and was a participant at three consecutive FIFA World Cups: 1994, 1998 and 2002. In the first he (aged 19) played all the matches and minutes, often being partnered by another youngster, Rigobert Song (17), in an eventual group stage exit. He was part of the victorious 2000 and 2002 African Cup of Nations squads.

After the 2002 World Cup, Kalla announced to retire from the national team due to conflicts with the Federation structure, which he accused of poor organization, but eventually changed his mind.

Initially summoned for the 2006 Africa Cup of Nations, Kalla was forced to withdraw due to injury, and retired for the second and definitive time.

== Honours ==
Cameroon

- African Cup of Nations: 2000, 2002
