= Olympic Mvolyé =

Cameroonian football club

- Founded: 1989; 36 years ago
Home colours

Olympic Mvolyé, also known as Olympique Mvolyé, is a Cameroonian football club based in Mvolyé.

== Overview ==
Olympic enjoyed some success in the 1990s as they won the Cameroonian Cup twice in 1992 and 1994 and then went on to compete in Elite One, the country's top level, from 1997 to 2001.

They also reached the second round of the African Cup Winners' Cup on two occasions in 1993 and 1995, where they were knocked out by El-Kanemi Warriors in 1993 and Hearts of Oak in 1995.

In the 1990s a number of Cameroon national football team regulars played for the club, including Stephen Tataw, Hans Agbo, Bertin Ebwellé, Benjamin Massing, Tobie Mimboe, Victor Ndip and Alphonse Yombi.

In Football Against the Enemy, Simon Kuper described Olympique Mvolyé as: "the richest and most bizarre club in Cameroon". Founded three years before their 1992 Cameroonian Cup final appearance, they were conceived as a homage to Olympique de Marseille by Damas Omgba, an arms dealing henchman of Paul Biya. The club became unpopular by paying relatively high wages to sign players from traditionally bigger clubs in Yaoundé.

Club captain Stephen Tataw was dragged from his car and beaten up by four armed men days before the 1992 Cameroonian Cup final against Diamant Yaoundé. He rebounded to play well in the match, winning the penalty kick from which teammate Bertin Ebwellé struck the only goal.
