= Valery Nepomnyashchy =

Russian footballer and manager

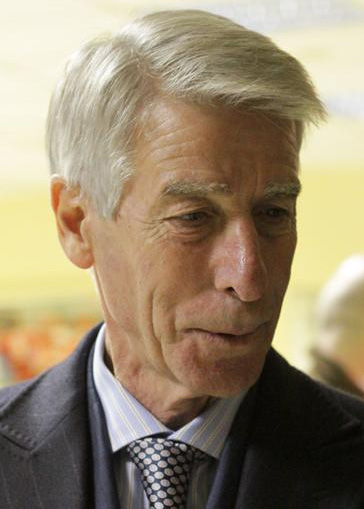
- Nepomnyashchy in 2010

Personal information
- Full name: Valery Kuzmich Nepomnyashchy
- Date of birth: 7 August 1943 (age 83)
- Place of birth: Slavgorod, Russian SFSR, Soviet Union
- Height: 1.79 m (5 ft 10 in)
- Position: Forward

Senior career*
Years	Team	Apps	(Gls)
1961–1965	SKIF Ashgabat		
1965–1967	Spartak Samarkand		

Managerial career
- 1982–1983: Kolhozchi Ashkhabad
- 1988–1990: Cameroon
- 1991: China (technical consultant)
- 1992–1993: Gençlerbirliği S.K.
- 1993–1994: Ankaragücü
- 1995–1998: Yukong Elephants / Bucheon SK
- 2000: Shenyang Haishi
- 2001: Sanfrecce Hiroshima
- 2002–2003: Shandong Luneng
- 2004–2005: Shanghai Shenhua
- 2006: Pakhtakor Tashkent
- 2006: Uzbekistan
- 2008–2011: Tom Tomsk
- 2012–2013: CSKA Moscow (technical consultant)
- 2014–2016: Tom Tomsk
- 2018: Baltika Kaliningrad
- 2018–2019: Baltika Kaliningrad (youth development)
- * Club domestic league appearances and goals

Valery Kuzmich Nepomnyashchy (Russian: Валерий Кузьмич Непомнящий; born 7 August 1943) is a Russian association football manager and a former player.

Most famously he coached the Cameroon national football team when they surprisingly made the quarter-finals in the 1990 FIFA World Cup. From 1992 to 1994 he coached clubs in Turkey. In 1995, he became manager of South Korea's Yukong Elephants (currently Jeju United FC), and in 1996 led them to a victory in League Cup. In 2001, he took over as J. League club Sanfrecce Hiroshima's manager from Eddie Thomson. He has also coached Shanghai Shenhua, (whom he led to a second-place finish for the first time in his career), from 2004 to 2005, and the Uzbekistan national football team in 2006. He worked as a football commentator for a Russian television channel, “NTV-Plus”.

== Early life ==
Nepomnyashchy was born in Altai Krai, Soviet Union during World War II. His mother, pregnant with him, was evacuated there from Moscow, after his father was killed during the war. In 1947, they moved to the Turkmen Soviet Socialist Republic, nowadays Turkmenistan, where he would start his youth career. He graduated from the Turkmen State University in 1969.

== Career ==
Nepomnyashchy would start his career as a footballer where his greatest achievement was to play as a striker for third tier Soviet football club Spartak Samarkand. His career was however cut short due to health problems and he had to retire at the age of 25 years. This saw him move into physical education and coaching that would see him land a job within the football coaching sports committee of Turkmenistan from 1970 to 1978. By 1979 he would achieve his first assistant coaching job with third tier Turkmen football club Kolhozchi Ashkhabad and by 1982 he was named as their head coach where he led them to eighth in his debut season.

By the end of 1983 Nepomnyashchy had returned to the Turkmenistan Sports committee until in 1984 when he was doing training courses in Moscow, he was asked by the Russian Office of football if he wanted to work abroad. Nepomnyashchy soon accepted the offer and was expected to provide training courses and assistance to developing countries such as Algeria, Tunisia and Suriname. Nepomnyashchy would find these trips as too frustrating and periodical in there planning until Cameroon offered him a concrete proposal. Initially Nepomnyashchy thought that the Russian funded aid would see him coach one of the Cameroon youth teams, however with the previous manager Claude Le Roy deciding to leave to join Senegal there was an unexpected vacancy for the senior Head coach position, which Nepomnyashchy took and signed a two-year contract with the team.

At first Nepomnyashchy would struggle with the French language and had to use an interpreter, however he would eventually get his message across on what he wanted his team to do and they would qualify for the 1990 FIFA World Cup. Drawn in Group B they unexpectedly beat reigning champions Argentina as well as Romania to book their place within the last 16. After beating Colombia 2-1 in extra-time Cameroon eventually lost to England in the Quarter-Finals. While he was offered an extension to his contract, Nepomnyashchy decided to leave the team after his contract expired to take on a more lucrative position with the Chinese Football Association as a technical consultant.

In the 1992–93 1.Lig season Nepomnyashchy would return to management with Turkish side Gençlerbirliği S.K. before joining another Turkish side in Ankaragücü the following season. After an uninspired time within Turkey he would move to South Korea where he had a successful spell with Bucheon Yukong where he won the 1996 Korean League Cup with them. After his time in South Korea ended he returned to Russia for FC Dynamo Stavropol where he acted as a consultant in 1999 before returning to Asia where he went on to manage several different clubs before returning to national team management when he coached Uzbekistan after having a spell with one of its clubs, Pakhtakor FK where he won the 2006 league title with them.

In September 2008 he signed a 2-year contract with Russian club Tom Tomsk.

== Managerial statistics ==
Team	From	To	Record				
Team	From	To	G	W	D	L	Win %
Sanfrecce Hiroshima	2000	2000	30	13	0	17	43.33
Total			30	13	0	17	43.33

== Honours ==
=== As a manager ===
Yukong Elephants / Bucheon SK

- Korean League Cup Winner: 1996

Pakhtakor FK

- Champion of Uzbek League: 2006
- Cup holder in Uzbekistan Cup: 2006

=== Individual ===
- Honored coach of the Turkmen SSR (1990)
- Legion of Honor (Cameroon, 1990)
- Award for "Contribution to the development of the South Korean Football" (1996)
- Best Coach of the Year in China (2000)
- The badge "For Services to the Tomsk region" (2010)
