= Cyrille Makanaky =

Cameroonian retired footballer

Personal information
- Full name: Cyrille Thomas Makanaky
- Date of birth: 28 June 1965 (age 61)
- Place of birth: Douala, Cameroon
- Height: 1.83 m (6 ft 0 in)
- Position: Midfielder

Senior career*
Years	Team	Apps	(Gls)
1984–1985	Saint-Leu	30	(26)
1985–1987	Gazélec Ajaccio	48	(22)
1987–1988	Toulon	21	(3)
1988–1989	Lens	14	(3)
1989–1990	Toulon	21	(0)
1990–1992	Málaga	39	(6)
1992–1993	Villarreal	16	(0)
1993–1994	Maccabi Tel Aviv	30	(5)
1994–1995	Barcelona SC	30	(9)
1995–1996	Gazélec Ajaccio	34	(18)
1996–1997	Barcelona SC	24	(1)
Total		289	(93)

International career
1987–1993	Cameroon	14	(3)
Medal record
Men's football
Representing Cameroon
Africa Cup of Nations
Winner	1988 Morocco
- * Club domestic league appearances and goals

Cyrille Thomas Makanaky (born 28 June 1965) is a Cameroonian retired footballer who played as an attacking midfielder.

== Club career ==
Makanaky was born in Douala. After impressing at amateur level in France, with FC Saint-Leu and Gazélec Ajaccio, he represented, with little impact but always in Ligue 1, SC Toulon (twice) and RC Lens.

In 1990, Makanaky moved to Spain and remained in the country for three years, playing in Segunda División for CD Málaga and Villarreal CF. His second year, whilst at the Andalusians, finished in relegation, and the club folded soon afterwards.

Until his retirement at the age of 32, Makanaky also played in Israel with Maccabi Tel Aviv FC, Ecuador for Barcelona Sporting Club – two spells, winning the national league on both occasions – and France with former side Gazélec.

== International career ==
Makanaky appeared in two Africa Cup of Nations with the Cameroon national team. In the 1988 edition, held in Morocco, he scored the game's only goal, helping defeat the hosts in the semifinals and eventually winning the trophy.

Makanaky also represented the nation at the 1990 FIFA World Cup in Italy, playing all five matches (two complete) as the Lions Indomptables reached the quarterfinals.

In popular culture "Makanaki" is a nickname coined from Makanaky's name and was commonly used in some Yoruba speaking parts of western Nigeria after the exploits of the Cameroun National Team in the FIFA 1990 World Cup. The ruggedness and flamboyance of Makanaky led to the use of the Nigerianized version of the name to be used to refer to a skillful and rugged person.

== Honours ==
Cameroon

- African Cup of Nations: 1988
