= 1986 FIFA World Cup squads =

Below are the squads for the 1986 FIFA World Cup final tournament in Mexico.

== Group A ==
=== Argentina ===
Head coach: Carlos Bilardo

No.	Pos.	Player	Date of birth (age)	Caps	Club
1	FW	Sergio Almirón	18 November 1958 (aged 27)	3	(Argentina) Newell's Old Boys
2	MF	Sergio Batista	9 November 1962 (aged 23)	5	(Argentina) Argentinos Juniors
3	MF	Ricardo Bochini	25 January 1954 (aged 32)	27	(Argentina) Independiente
4	MF	Claudio Borghi	28 September 1964 (aged 21)	4	(Argentina) Argentinos Juniors
5	DF	José Luis Brown	10 November 1956 (aged 29)	14	(Argentina) Deportivo Español
6	DF	Daniel Passarella	25 May 1953 (aged 33)	68	(Italy) Fiorentina
7	MF	Jorge Burruchaga	9 October 1962 (aged 23)	33	(France) Nantes
8	DF	Néstor Clausen	29 September 1962 (aged 23)	20	(Argentina) Independiente
9	DF	José Luis Cuciuffo	1 February 1961 (aged 25)	1	(Argentina) Vélez Sársfield
10	MF	Diego Maradona (captain)	30 October 1960 (aged 25)	44	(Italy) Napoli
11	FW	Jorge Valdano	4 October 1955 (aged 30)	13	(Spain) Real Madrid
12	MF	Héctor Enrique	26 April 1962 (aged 24)	2	(Argentina) River Plate
13	DF	Oscar Garré	9 December 1956 (aged 29)	32	(Argentina) Ferro Carril Oeste
14	MF	Ricardo Giusti	11 December 1956 (aged 29)	26	(Argentina) Independiente
15	GK	Luis Islas	22 December 1965 (aged 20)	10	(Argentina) Estudiantes La Plata
16	DF	Julio Olarticoechea	18 October 1958 (aged 27)	5	(Argentina) Boca Juniors
17	FW	Pedro Pasculli	17 May 1960 (aged 26)	13	(Italy) Lecce
18	GK	Nery Pumpido	30 July 1957 (aged 28)	15	(Argentina) River Plate
19	DF	Oscar Ruggeri (vice-captain)	26 January 1962 (aged 24)	19	(Argentina) River Plate
20	MF	Carlos Tapia	20 August 1962 (aged 23)	2	(Argentina) Boca Juniors
21	MF	Marcelo Trobbiani	17 February 1955 (aged 31)	25	(Colombia) Millonarios
22	GK	Héctor Zelada	30 April 1957 (aged 29)	0	(Mexico) América

Note that this squad is numbered alphabetically by surname, unlike traditional numbering systems where the goalkeeper has shirt number 1 and so forth. Exceptions were Daniel Passarella, Diego Maradona and Jorge Valdano, who were given their favoured #6, #10, and #11 shirts.

=== Bulgaria ===
Head coach: Ivan Vutsov

No.	Pos.	Player	Date of birth (age)	Caps	Club
1	GK	Borislav Mihaylov	12 February 1963 (aged 23)	26	(Bulgaria) Vitosha Sofia
2	FW	Nasko Sirakov	26 April 1962 (aged 24)	18	(Bulgaria) Vitosha Sofia
3	DF	Nikolay Arabov	21 February 1953 (aged 33)	39	(Bulgaria) Sliven
4	DF	Petar Petrov	20 February 1961 (aged 25)	37	(Bulgaria) Vitosha Sofia
5	DF	Georgi Dimitrov (captain)	14 January 1959 (aged 27)	65	(Bulgaria) Sredec Sofia
6	FW	Andrey Zhelyazkov	9 July 1952 (aged 33)	51	(France) Strasbourg
7	MF	Bozhidar Iskrenov	1 August 1962 (aged 23)	33	(Bulgaria) Vitosha Sofia
8	MF	Ayan Sadakov	28 September 1961 (aged 24)	47	(Bulgaria) Lokomotiv Plovdiv
9	FW	Stoycho Mladenov	24 April 1957 (aged 29)	55	(Bulgaria) Sredec Sofia
10	MF	Zhivko Gospodinov	6 September 1957 (aged 28)	36	(Bulgaria) Spartak Varna
11	MF	Plamen Getov	4 March 1959 (aged 27)	18	(Bulgaria) Spartak Pleven
12	MF	Radoslav Zdravkov	30 July 1956 (aged 29)	65	(Bulgaria) Sredec Sofia
13	DF	Aleksandar Markov	17 August 1961 (aged 24)	18	(Bulgaria) Spartak Pleven
14	MF	Plamen Markov	11 September 1957 (aged 28)	37	(France) Metz
15	MF	Georgi Yordanov	21 July 1963 (aged 22)	10	(Bulgaria) Vitosha Sofia
16	FW	Vasil Dragolov	17 August 1962 (aged 23)	2	(Bulgaria) Beroe Stara Zagora
17	MF	Hristo Kolev	21 September 1964 (aged 21)	7	(Bulgaria) Lokomotiv Plovdiv
18	FW	Boycho Velichkov	13 August 1958 (aged 27)	26	(Bulgaria) Lokomotiv Sofia
19	FW	Atanas Pashev	21 November 1963 (aged 22)	14	(Bulgaria) Trakia Plovdiv
20	FW	Kostadin Kostadinov	25 June 1959 (aged 26)	41	(Bulgaria) Trakia Plovdiv
21	DF	Iliya Dyakov	28 September 1963 (aged 22)	5	(Bulgaria) Dobrudzha Tolbuchin
22	GK	Iliya Valov	29 December 1961 (aged 24)	13	(Bulgaria) Botev Vratsa

=== Italy ===
Head coach: Enzo Bearzot

No.	Pos.	Player	Date of birth (age)	Caps	Club
1	GK	Giovanni Galli	29 April 1958 (aged 28)	15	(Italy) Fiorentina
2	DF	Giuseppe Bergomi	22 December 1963 (aged 22)	28	(Italy) Internazionale
3	DF	Antonio Cabrini	8 October 1957 (aged 28)	64	(Italy) Juventus
4	DF	Fulvio Collovati	9 May 1957 (aged 29)	49	(Italy) Internazionale
5	DF	Sebastiano Nela	13 March 1961 (aged 25)	2	(Italy) Roma
6	DF	Gaetano Scirea (captain)	25 May 1953 (aged 33)	74	(Italy) Juventus
7	DF	Roberto Tricella	18 March 1959 (aged 27)	6	(Italy) Hellas Verona
8	DF	Pietro Vierchowod	6 April 1959 (aged 27)	23	(Italy) Sampdoria
9	MF	Carlo Ancelotti	10 June 1959 (aged 26)	11	(Italy) Roma
10	MF	Salvatore Bagni	25 September 1956 (aged 29)	25	(Italy) Napoli
11	MF	Giuseppe Baresi	7 February 1958 (aged 28)	15	(Italy) Internazionale
12	GK	Franco Tancredi	10 January 1955 (aged 31)	12	(Italy) Roma
13	MF	Fernando De Napoli	15 March 1964 (aged 22)	1	(Italy) Avellino
14	MF	Antonio Di Gennaro	5 October 1958 (aged 27)	11	(Italy) Hellas Verona
15	MF	Marco Tardelli	24 September 1954 (aged 31)	81	(Italy) Internazionale
16	FW	Bruno Conti	13 March 1955 (aged 31)	43	(Italy) Roma
17	FW	Gianluca Vialli	9 July 1964 (aged 21)	4	(Italy) Sampdoria
18	FW	Alessandro Altobelli	28 November 1955 (aged 30)	39	(Italy) Internazionale
19	FW	Giuseppe Galderisi	22 March 1963 (aged 23)	6	(Italy) Hellas Verona
20	FW	Paolo Rossi	23 September 1956 (aged 29)	48	(Italy) Milan
21	FW	Aldo Serena	25 June 1960 (aged 25)	5	(Italy) Juventus
22	GK	Walter Zenga	30 April 1960 (aged 26)	0	(Italy) Internazionale

Note: with the exception of the goalkeepers, who were assigned the traditional shirt numbers for the role (1, 12 and 22) the Italian team was numbered alphabetically within their respective positions – Defenders (from 2 to 8), Midfielders (from 9 to 15), Wingers (16 and 17) and Forwards (from 18 to 21).

=== South Korea ===
Head coach: Kim Jung-nam

No.	Pos.	Player	Date of birth (age)	Caps	Club
1	GK	Cho Byung-deuk	26 May 1958 (aged 28)	0	(South Korea) Hallelujah FC
2	DF	Park Kyung-hoon	19 January 1961 (aged 25)	0	(South Korea) POSCO Atoms
3	DF	Chung Jong-soo	27 March 1961 (aged 25)	0	(South Korea) Yukong Elephants
4	MF	Cho Kwang-rae	19 March 1954 (aged 32)	0	(South Korea) Daewoo Royals
5	DF	Chung Yong-hwan	10 February 1960 (aged 26)	0	(South Korea) Daewoo Royals
6	FW	Lee Tae-ho	29 January 1961 (aged 25)	0	(South Korea) Daewoo Royals
7	FW	Kim Jong-boo	3 November 1965 (aged 20)	0	(South Korea) Korea University
8	DF	Cho Young-jeung	18 August 1954 (aged 31)	0	(South Korea) Lucky-Goldstar Hwangso
9	FW	Choi Soon-ho	10 January 1962 (aged 24)	47	(South Korea) POSCO Atoms
10	MF	Park Chang-sun (captain)	2 February 1954 (aged 32)	0	(South Korea) Daewoo Royals
11	FW	Cha Bum-kun	21 May 1953 (aged 33)	125	(West Germany) Bayer Leverkusen
12	DF	Kim Pyung-seok	22 September 1958 (aged 27)	0	(South Korea) Hyundai Horangi
13	MF	Noh Soo-jin	10 February 1962 (aged 24)	0	(South Korea) Yukong Elephants
14	DF	Cho Min-kook	5 July 1963 (aged 22)	0	(South Korea) Lucky-Goldstar Hwangso
15	DF	Yoo Byung-ok	2 March 1964 (aged 22)	0	(South Korea) Hanyang University
16	MF	Kim Joo-sung	17 January 1966 (aged 20)	0	(South Korea) Chosun University
17	MF	Huh Jung-moo	13 January 1955 (aged 31)	103	(South Korea) Hyundai Horangi
18	MF	Kim Sam-soo	8 February 1963 (aged 23)	0	(South Korea) Hyundai Horangi
19	FW	Byun Byung-joo	26 April 1961 (aged 25)	0	(South Korea) Daewoo Royals
20	FW	Kim Yong-se	21 April 1960 (aged 26)	0	(South Korea) Yukong Elephants
21	GK	Oh Yun-kyo	25 May 1960 (aged 26)	0	(South Korea) Yukong Elephants
22	MF	Kang Deuk-soo	16 August 1961 (aged 24)	0	(South Korea) Lucky-Goldstar Hwangso

== Group B ==
=== Belgium ===
Head coach: Guy Thys

No.	Pos.	Player	Date of birth (age)	Caps	Club
1	GK	Jean-Marie Pfaff	4 December 1953 (aged 32)	51	(West Germany) Bayern Munich
2	DF	Eric Gerets	18 May 1954 (aged 32)	56	(Netherlands) PSV
3	MF	Franky Van der Elst	30 April 1961 (aged 25)	9	(Belgium) Club Brugge
4	DF	Michel De Wolf	19 January 1958 (aged 28)	17	(Belgium) Gent
5	DF	Michel Renquin	3 November 1955 (aged 30)	47	(Belgium) Standard Liège
6	MF	Franky Vercauteren	28 October 1956 (aged 29)	48	(Belgium) Anderlecht
7	MF	René Vandereycken	22 July 1953 (aged 32)	48	(Belgium) Anderlecht
8	MF	Enzo Scifo	19 February 1966 (aged 20)	13	(Belgium) Anderlecht
9	FW	Erwin Vandenbergh	26 January 1959 (aged 27)	39	(Belgium) Anderlecht
10	MF	Philippe Desmet	29 November 1958 (aged 27)	3	(Belgium) Waregem
11	MF	Jan Ceulemans (captain)	28 February 1957 (aged 29)	56	(Belgium) Club Brugge
12	GK	Jacky Munaron	8 September 1956 (aged 29)	7	(Belgium) Anderlecht
13	DF	Georges Grün	25 January 1962 (aged 24)	15	(Belgium) Anderlecht
14	DF	Leo Clijsters	6 November 1956 (aged 29)	13	(Belgium) Waterschei Thor
15	MF	Leo Van der Elst	7 January 1962 (aged 24)	6	(Belgium) Club Brugge
16	FW	Nico Claesen	7 October 1962 (aged 23)	14	(Belgium) Standard Liège
17	FW	Raymond Mommens	27 December 1958 (aged 27)	14	(Belgium) Lokeren
18	FW	Daniel Veyt	9 December 1956 (aged 29)	2	(Belgium) Waregem
19	DF	Hugo Broos	10 April 1952 (aged 34)	21	(Belgium) Club Brugge
20	GK	Gilbert Bodart	2 September 1962 (aged 23)	1	(Belgium) Standard Liège
21	DF	Stéphane Demol	11 March 1966 (aged 20)	2	(Belgium) Anderlecht
22	MF	Patrick Vervoort	17 January 1965 (aged 21)	2	(Belgium) Beerschot

=== Iraq ===
Head coach: (Brazil) Evaristo

No.	Pos.	Player	Date of birth (age)	Caps	Club
1	GK	Raad Hammoudi (captain)	30 April 1953 (aged 33)	0	(Iraq) Al-Shorta
2	DF	Maad Ibrahim	30 June 1960 (aged 25)	0	(Iraq) Al-Rasheed
3	DF	Khalil Allawi	6 September 1958 (aged 27)	0	(Iraq) Al-Rasheed
4	DF	Nadhim Shaker	13 April 1958 (aged 28)	0	(Iraq) Al-Tayaran
5	DF	Samir Shaker	28 February 1958 (aged 28)	0	(Iraq) Al-Rasheed
6	MF	Ali Hussein Shihab	5 May 1961 (aged 25)	0	(Iraq) Al-Talaba
7	MF	Haris Mohammed	3 March 1958 (aged 28)	0	(Iraq) Al-Rasheed
8	FW	Ahmed Radhi	21 March 1964 (aged 22)	0	(Iraq) Al-Rasheed
9	FW	Karim Saddam	26 May 1960 (aged 26)	0	(Iraq) Al-Jaish
10	FW	Hussein Saeed	21 January 1958 (aged 28)	0	(Iraq) Al-Talaba
11	FW	Rahim Hameed	23 May 1963 (aged 23)	0	(Iraq) Al-Jaish
12	MF	Jamal Ali	2 February 1956 (aged 30)	0	(Iraq) Al-Talaba
13	DF	Karim Allawi	1 April 1960 (aged 26)	0	(Iraq) Al-Rasheed
14	MF	Basil Gorgis	15 January 1961 (aged 25)	0	(Iraq) Al-Shabab
15	MF	Natiq Hashim	15 January 1960 (aged 26)	0	(Iraq) Al-Tayaran
16	MF	Shaker Mahmoud	5 May 1963 (aged 23)	0	(Iraq) Al-Shabab
17	FW	Anad Abid	3 August 1955 (aged 30)	0	(Iraq) Al-Rasheed
18	MF	Ismail Mohammed Sharif	19 January 1962 (aged 24)	0	(Iraq) Al-Shabab
19	DF	Basim Qasim	22 March 1963 (aged 23)	0	(Iraq) Al-Shorta
20	GK	Fatah Nsaief	2 February 1951 (aged 35)	0	(Iraq) Al-Jaish
21	GK	Ahmad Jassim	4 May 1960 (aged 26)	0	(Iraq) Al-Rasheed
22	DF	Ghanim Oraibi	16 August 1961 (aged 24)	0	(Iraq) Al-Shabab

=== Mexico ===
Head coach: (Socialist Federal Republic of Yugoslavia) Bora Milutinović

No.	Pos.	Player	Date of birth (age)	Caps	Club
1	GK	Pablo Larios	31 July 1960 (aged 25)	31	(Mexico) Cruz Azul
2	DF	Mario Trejo	11 February 1956 (aged 30)	50	(Mexico) América
3	DF	Fernando Quirarte	17 May 1956 (aged 30)	30	(Mexico) Guadalajara
4	DF	Armando Manzo	16 October 1958 (aged 27)	35	(Mexico) América
5	FW	Francisco Javier Cruz	24 May 1966 (aged 20)	2	(Mexico) Monterrey
6	MF	Carlos de los Cobos	10 December 1958 (aged 27)	23	(Mexico) América
7	MF	Miguel España	31 January 1964 (aged 22)	35	(Mexico) Pumas UNAM
8	MF	Alejandro Domínguez	9 February 1961 (aged 25)	15	(Mexico) América
9	FW	Hugo Sánchez	11 July 1958 (aged 27)	37	(Spain) Real Madrid
10	MF	Tomás Boy (captain)	28 June 1951 (aged 34)	42	(Mexico) Tigres
11	FW	Carlos Hermosillo	24 August 1964 (aged 21)	18	(Mexico) América
12	GK	Ignacio Rodríguez	13 August 1956 (aged 29)	11	(Mexico) Atlante
13	MF	Javier Aguirre	1 December 1958 (aged 27)	43	(Mexico) Atlante
14	DF	Felix Cruz	4 April 1961 (aged 25)	32	(Mexico) Pumas UNAM
15	FW	Luis Flores	18 July 1961 (aged 24)	34	(Mexico) Pumas UNAM
16	MF	Carlos Muñoz	8 September 1962 (aged 23)	32	(Mexico) Tigres
17	DF	Raúl Servín	29 April 1963 (aged 23)	20	(Mexico) Pumas UNAM
18	DF	Rafael Amador	16 February 1959 (aged 27)	25	(Mexico) Pumas UNAM
19	MF	Javier Hernández	1 August 1961 (aged 24)	19	(Mexico) Tecos
20	GK	Olaf Heredia	19 October 1957 (aged 28)	17	(Mexico) Tigres
21	FW	Cristóbal Ortega	25 July 1956 (aged 29)	24	(Mexico) América
22	MF	Manuel Negrete	15 May 1959 (aged 27)	41	(Mexico) Pumas UNAM

=== Paraguay ===
Head coach: Cayetano Ré

No.	Pos.	Player	Date of birth (age)	Caps	Club
1	GK	Roberto Fernández	9 July 1954 (aged 31)	43	(Colombia) Deportivo Cali
2	DF	Juan Torales	9 May 1956 (aged 30)	58	(Paraguay) Libertad
3	DF	César Zabala	3 June 1961 (aged 24)	2	(Paraguay) Cerro Porteño
4	DF	Vladimiro Schettina	8 October 1955 (aged 30)	4	(Paraguay) Guaraní
5	DF	Rogelio Delgado (captain)	12 October 1959 (aged 26)	4	(Paraguay) Olimpia
6	MF	Jorge Amado Nunes	18 October 1961 (aged 24)	2	(Colombia) Deportivo Cali
7	MF	Buenaventura Ferreira	4 July 1960 (aged 25)	2	(Colombia) Deportivo Cali
8	MF	Romerito	28 August 1960 (aged 25)	11	(Brazil) Fluminense
9	FW	Roberto Cabañas	11 April 1961 (aged 25)	2	(Colombia) América de Cali
10	MF	Adolfino Cañete	13 September 1956 (aged 29)	4	(Mexico) Cruz Azul
11	FW	Alfredo Mendoza	31 December 1963 (aged 22)	4	(Colombia) Independiente Medellín
12	GK	Jorge Battaglia	12 May 1960 (aged 26)	0	(Paraguay) Sol de America
13	DF	Virginio Cáceres	21 May 1962 (aged 24)	2	(Paraguay) Guaraní
14	DF	Luis Caballero	17 September 1962 (aged 23)	0	(Paraguay) Guaraní
15	FW	Eufemio Cabral	21 March 1955 (aged 31)	?	(Paraguay) Guaraní
16	MF	Jorge Guasch	17 January 1961 (aged 25)	0	(Paraguay) Olimpia
17	FW	Francisco Alcaraz	4 October 1960 (aged 25)	?	(Paraguay) Nacional
18	FW	Evaristo Isasi	26 October 1955 (aged 30)	6	(Paraguay) Olimpia
19	MF	Rolando Chilavert	22 May 1961 (aged 25)	?	(Paraguay) Guaraní
20	FW	Ramón Hicks	30 May 1959 (aged 27)	1	(Paraguay) Libertad
21	FW	Faustino Alonso	15 February 1961 (aged 25)	?	(Paraguay) Sol de America
22	GK	Julián Coronel	23 October 1958 (aged 27)	0	(Paraguay) Guaraní

== Group C ==
=== Canada ===
Head coach: (England) Tony Waiters

No.	Pos.	Player	Date of birth (age)	Caps	Club
1	GK	Tino Lettieri	27 September 1957 (aged 28)	21	(United States) Minnesota Strikers
2	DF	Bob Lenarduzzi	1 May 1955 (aged 31)	44	(United States) Tacoma Stars
3	DF	Bruce Wilson (captain)	20 June 1951 (aged 34)	54	Free agent
4	MF	Randy Ragan	7 June 1959 (aged 26)	32	(Canada) Toronto Blizzard
5	DF	Terry Moore	2 June 1958 (aged 27)	11	(Northern Ireland) Glentoran
6	DF	Ian Bridge	18 September 1959 (aged 26)	20	(Switzerland) La Chaux-de-Fonds
7	FW	Carl Valentine	4 July 1958 (aged 27)	3	(United States) Cleveland Force
8	MF	Gerry Gray	20 January 1961 (aged 25)	22	(United States) Chicago Sting
9	FW	Branko Šegota	8 June 1961 (aged 24)	11	(United States) San Diego Sockers
10	FW	Igor Vrablic	19 July 1965 (aged 20)	27	(Belgium) Seraing
11	MF	Mike Sweeney	25 December 1959 (aged 26)	26	(United States) Cleveland Force
12	DF	Randy Samuel	23 December 1963 (aged 22)	25	Free agent
13	FW	George Pakos	14 August 1952 (aged 33)	22	(Canada) Victoria Athletic Association
14	FW	Dale Mitchell	21 April 1958 (aged 28)	26	(United States) Kansas City Comets
15	MF	Paul James	11 November 1963 (aged 22)	30	(Canada) Toronto Blizzard
16	MF	Greg Ion	12 March 1963 (aged 23)	5	(United States) Los Angeles Lazers
17	MF	David Norman	6 May 1962 (aged 24)	22	(United States) Tacoma Stars
18	MF	Jamie Lowery	15 January 1961 (aged 25)	5	(Canada) Victoria University
19	DF	Pasquale De Luca	26 May 1962 (aged 24)	19	(United States) Cleveland Force
20	DF	Colin Miller	4 October 1964 (aged 21)	7	(Scotland) Rangers
21	GK	Sven Habermann	3 November 1961 (aged 24)	11	Free agent
22	GK	Paul Dolan	16 April 1966 (aged 20)	20	Free agent

=== France ===
Head coach: Henri Michel

No.	Pos.	Player	Date of birth (age)	Caps	Club
1	GK	Joël Bats	4 January 1957 (aged 29)	23	(France) Paris Saint-Germain
2	DF	Manuel Amoros	1 February 1962 (aged 24)	32	(France) Monaco
3	DF	William Ayache	10 January 1961 (aged 25)	9	(France) Nantes
4	DF	Patrick Battiston	12 March 1957 (aged 29)	42	(France) Bordeaux
5	DF	Michel Bibard	30 November 1958 (aged 27)	5	(France) Paris Saint-Germain
6	DF	Maxime Bossis	26 June 1955 (aged 30)	69	(France) Racing Paris
7	DF	Yvon Le Roux	19 April 1960 (aged 26)	18	(France) Nantes
8	DF	Thierry Tusseau	19 January 1958 (aged 28)	18	(France) Bordeaux
9	MF	Luis Fernandez	2 October 1959 (aged 26)	28	(France) Paris Saint-Germain
10	MF	Michel Platini (captain)	21 June 1955 (aged 30)	63	(Italy) Juventus
11	MF	Jean-Marc Ferreri	26 December 1962 (aged 23)	14	(France) Auxerre
12	MF	Alain Giresse	2 September 1952 (aged 33)	41	(France) Bordeaux
13	MF	Bernard Genghini	18 January 1958 (aged 28)	25	(France) Monaco
14	MF	Jean Tigana	23 June 1955 (aged 30)	40	(France) Bordeaux
15	MF	Philippe Vercruysse	28 January 1962 (aged 24)	2	(France) Lens
16	FW	Bruno Bellone	14 March 1962 (aged 24)	24	(France) Monaco
17	FW	Jean-Pierre Papin	5 November 1963 (aged 22)	1	(Belgium) Club Brugge
18	FW	Dominique Rocheteau	14 January 1955 (aged 31)	45	(France) Paris Saint-Germain
19	FW	Yannick Stopyra	9 January 1961 (aged 25)	16	(France) Toulouse
20	FW	Daniel Xuereb	22 June 1959 (aged 26)	3	(France) Lens
21	GK	Philippe Bergeroo	13 January 1954 (aged 32)	3	(France) Toulouse
22	GK	Albert Rust	10 October 1953 (aged 32)	0	(France) Sochaux

Note that this squad is numbered alphabetically by surname within each positional group, and the goalkeepers are assigned the traditional French goalkeepers' shirts 1, 21 and 22 alphabetically. Exceptions are Platini and Giresse who are given their favoured 10 and 12 shirts.

=== Hungary ===
Head coach: György Mezey

No.	Pos.	Player	Date of birth (age)	Caps	Club
1	GK	Péter Disztl	30 March 1960 (aged 26)	13	(Hungary) Videoton
2	DF	Sándor Sallai	26 March 1960 (aged 26)	31	(Hungary) Budapest Honvéd
3	DF	Antal Róth	14 September 1960 (aged 25)	18	(Hungary) Pécsi Munkás
4	DF	József Varga	9 October 1954 (aged 31)	29	(Turkey) Denizlispor
5	DF	József Kardos	22 March 1960 (aged 26)	27	(Hungary) Újpesti Dózsa
6	DF	Imre Garaba	29 July 1958 (aged 27)	53	(Hungary) Budapest Honvéd
7	FW	József Kiprich	6 September 1963 (aged 22)	14	(Hungary) Tatabányai Bányász
8	DF	Antal Nagy (captain)	17 October 1956 (aged 29)	25	(Hungary) Budapest Honvéd
9	FW	László Dajka	29 April 1959 (aged 27)	19	(Hungary) Budapest Honvéd
10	MF	Lajos Détári	24 April 1963 (aged 23)	17	(Hungary) Budapest Honvéd
11	FW	Márton Esterházy	9 April 1956 (aged 30)	21	(Greece) AEK Athens
12	DF	József Csuhay	12 July 1957 (aged 28)	9	(Hungary) Videoton
13	DF	László Disztl	4 June 1962 (aged 23)	5	(Hungary) Videoton
14	DF	Zoltán Péter	23 March 1958 (aged 28)	21	(Hungary) Zalaegerszeg
15	MF	Péter Hannich	30 March 1957 (aged 29)	23	(Hungary) Rába ETO Győr
16	MF	József Nagy	20 October 1960 (aged 25)	1	(Hungary) Szombathelyi Haladás
17	MF	Győző Burcsa	13 March 1954 (aged 32)	11	(France) Auxerre
18	GK	József Szendrei	25 April 1954 (aged 32)	2	(Hungary) Újpesti Dózsa
19	MF	György Bognár	5 November 1961 (aged 24)	7	(Hungary) MTK Hungária
20	FW	Kálmán Kovács	11 September 1965 (aged 20)	8	(Hungary) Budapest Honvéd
21	MF	Gyula Hajszán	9 October 1961 (aged 24)	22	(Hungary) Rába ETO Győr
22	GK	József Andrusch	31 March 1956 (aged 30)	5	(Hungary) Budapest Honvéd

=== Soviet Union ===
Head coach: Valeriy Lobanovskyi

No.	Pos.	Player	Date of birth (age)	Caps	Club
1	GK	Rinat Dasayev	13 June 1957 (aged 28)	58	(Soviet Union) Spartak Moscow
2	DF	Volodymyr Bezsonov	5 March 1958 (aged 28)	53	(Soviet Union) Dynamo Kyiv
3	DF	Aleksandr Chivadze	8 April 1955 (aged 31)	42	(Soviet Union) Dinamo Tbilisi
4	DF	Gennady Morozov	30 December 1962 (aged 23)	9	(Soviet Union) Spartak Moscow
5	DF	Anatoliy Demyanenko (captain)	19 February 1959 (aged 27)	46	(Soviet Union) Dynamo Kyiv
6	DF	Aleksandr Bubnov	10 October 1955 (aged 30)	32	(Soviet Union) Spartak Moscow
7	MF	Ivan Yaremchuk	19 March 1962 (aged 24)	2	(Soviet Union) Dynamo Kyiv
8	MF	Pavlo Yakovenko	19 December 1964 (aged 21)	1	(Soviet Union) Dynamo Kyiv
9	MF	Oleksandr Zavarov	24 April 1961 (aged 25)	7	(Soviet Union) Dynamo Kyiv
10	DF	Oleh Kuznetsov	22 March 1963 (aged 23)	5	(Soviet Union) Dynamo Kyiv
11	FW	Oleh Blokhin	5 November 1952 (aged 33)	104	(Soviet Union) Dynamo Kyiv
12	MF	Andriy Bal	16 February 1958 (aged 28)	17	(Soviet Union) Dynamo Kyiv
13	MF	Hennadiy Litovchenko	11 September 1963 (aged 22)	18	(Soviet Union) Dnipro Dnipropetrovsk
14	FW	Sergey Rodionov	3 September 1962 (aged 23)	17	(Soviet Union) Spartak Moscow
15	DF	Nikolay Larionov	19 January 1957 (aged 29)	15	(Soviet Union) Zenit Leningrad
16	GK	Viktor Chanov	21 July 1959 (aged 26)	1	(Soviet Union) Dynamo Kyiv
17	MF	Vadym Yevtushenko	1 January 1958 (aged 28)	7	(Soviet Union) Dynamo Kyiv
18	FW	Oleh Protasov	4 February 1964 (aged 22)	19	(Soviet Union) Dnipro Dnipropetrovsk
19	MF	Ihor Belanov	25 September 1960 (aged 25)	4	(Soviet Union) Dynamo Kyiv
20	MF	Sergei Aleinikov	7 November 1961 (aged 24)	23	(Soviet Union) Dinamo Minsk
21	MF	Vasyl Rats	25 April 1961 (aged 25)	2	(Soviet Union) Dynamo Kyiv
22	GK	Serhiy Krakovskiy	11 August 1960 (aged 25)	0	(Soviet Union) Dnipro Dnipropetrovsk

== Group D ==
=== Algeria ===
Head coach: Rabah Saâdane

No.	Pos.	Player	Date of birth (age)	Caps	Club
1	GK	Nacerdine Drid	22 January 1957 (aged 29)	22	(Algeria) MP Oran
2	DF	Mahmoud Guendouz (captain)	24 February 1953 (aged 33)	71	(Algeria) JS El Biar
3	MF	Fathi Chebel	19 August 1956 (aged 29)	?	(France) Rouen
4	DF	Noureddine Kourichi	12 April 1954 (aged 32)	3	(France) Lille
5	DF	Abdellah Medjadi Liegeon	1 December 1957 (aged 28)	0	(France) Monaco
6	MF	Mohamed Kaci-Saïd	2 May 1958 (aged 28)	0	(Algeria) RS Kouba
7	FW	Salah Assad	13 March 1958 (aged 28)	60	(France) Mulhouse
8	MF	Karim Maroc	5 March 1958 (aged 28)	0	(France) Montpellier
9	FW	Djamel Menad	22 July 1960 (aged 25)	46	(Algeria) JE Tizi-Ouzou
10	MF	Lakhdar Belloumi	29 December 1958 (aged 27)	69	(Algeria) GCR Mascara
11	FW	Rabah Madjer	15 December 1958 (aged 27)	61	(Portugal) Porto
12	FW	Tedj Bensaoula	1 December 1954 (aged 31)	49	(France) Le Havre
13	FW	Rachid Harkouk	16 May 1956 (aged 30)	0	(England) Notts County
14	FW	Djamel Zidane	28 April 1955 (aged 31)	2	(Belgium) Waterschei Thor
15	DF	Abdelhamid Sadmi	1 January 1961 (aged 25)	1	(Algeria) JE Tizi-Ouzou
16	DF	Faouzi Mansouri	17 January 1956 (aged 30)	21	(France) Montpellier
17	MF	Fawzi Benkhalidi	3 February 1963 (aged 23)	?	(Algeria) WKF Boufarik
18	MF	Halim Benmabrouk	25 June 1960 (aged 25)	0	(France) Racing Paris
19	DF	Mohamed Chaïb	20 May 1957 (aged 29)	0	(Algeria) RS Kouba
20	DF	Fodil Megharia	23 May 1961 (aged 25)	19	(Algeria) ASO Chlef
21	GK	Larbi El Hadi	27 May 1961 (aged 25)	0	(Algeria) WKF Boufarik
22	GK	Mourad Amara	19 February 1959 (aged 27)	4	(Algeria) JE Tizi-Ouzou

=== Brazil ===
Head coach: Telê Santana

No.	Pos.	Player	Date of birth (age)	Caps	Club
1	GK	Carlos	4 March 1956 (aged 30)	16	(Brazil) Corinthians
2	DF	Édson	3 July 1959 (aged 26)	17	(Brazil) Corinthians
3	DF	Oscar	20 June 1954 (aged 31)	59	(Brazil) São Paulo
4	DF	Edinho (captain)	5 June 1955 (aged 30)	40	(Italy) Udinese
5	MF	Falcão	16 October 1953 (aged 32)	26	(Brazil) São Paulo
6	MF	Júnior	29 June 1954 (aged 31)	56	(Italy) Torino
7	FW	Müller	31 January 1966 (aged 20)	7	(Brazil) São Paulo
8	FW	Casagrande	15 April 1963 (aged 23)	16	(Brazil) Corinthians
9	FW	Careca	5 October 1960 (aged 25)	28	(Brazil) São Paulo
10	MF	Zico	3 March 1953 (aged 33)	68	(Brazil) Flamengo
11	FW	Edivaldo	13 April 1962 (aged 24)	2	(Brazil) Atlético Mineiro
12	GK	Paulo Vítor	7 June 1957 (aged 28)	8	(Brazil) Fluminense
13	DF	Josimar	19 September 1961 (aged 24)	0	(Brazil) Botafogo
14	DF	Júlio César	8 March 1963 (aged 23)	1	(Brazil) Guarani
15	MF	Alemão	22 November 1961 (aged 24)	14	(Brazil) Botafogo
16	DF	Mauro Galvão	19 December 1961 (aged 24)	1	(Brazil) Internacional
17	DF	Branco	4 April 1964 (aged 22)	9	(Brazil) Fluminense
18	MF	Sócrates	19 February 1954 (aged 32)	55	(Brazil) Flamengo
19	MF	Elzo	22 January 1961 (aged 25)	6	(Brazil) Atlético Mineiro
20	MF	Silas	27 August 1965 (aged 20)	3	(Brazil) São Paulo
21	MF	Valdo	12 January 1964 (aged 22)	0	(Brazil) Grêmio
22	GK	Leão	11 July 1949 (aged 36)	80	(Brazil) Palmeiras

=== Northern Ireland ===
Head coach: Billy Bingham

No.	Pos.	Player	Date of birth (age)	Caps	Club
1	GK	Pat Jennings	12 June 1945 (aged 40)	116	(England) Everton
2	DF	Jimmy Nicholl	28 December 1956 (aged 29)	70	(England) West Bromwich Albion
3	DF	Mal Donaghy	13 September 1957 (aged 28)	42	(England) Luton Town
4	DF	John O'Neill	11 March 1958 (aged 28)	36	(England) Leicester City
5	DF	Alan McDonald	12 October 1963 (aged 22)	5	(England) Queens Park Rangers
6	MF	David McCreery	16 September 1957 (aged 28)	53	(England) Newcastle United
7	MF	Steve Penney	16 January 1964 (aged 22)	7	(England) Brighton & Hove Albion
8	MF	Sammy McIlroy (captain)	2 August 1954 (aged 31)	84	(England) Manchester City
9	FW	Jimmy Quinn	18 November 1959 (aged 26)	11	(England) Blackburn Rovers
10	MF	Norman Whiteside	7 May 1965 (aged 21)	26	(England) Manchester United
11	FW	Ian Stewart	10 September 1961 (aged 24)	26	(England) Newcastle United
12	GK	Jim Platt	26 January 1951 (aged 35)	23	(Northern Ireland) Coleraine
13	GK	Philip Hughes	19 November 1964 (aged 21)	0	(England) Bury
14	FW	Gerry Armstrong	23 May 1954 (aged 32)	62	(England) Chesterfield
15	DF	Nigel Worthington	4 November 1961 (aged 24)	8	(England) Sheffield Wednesday
16	MF	Paul Ramsey	3 September 1962 (aged 23)	9	(England) Leicester City
17	FW	Colin Clarke	30 October 1962 (aged 23)	3	(England) AFC Bournemouth
18	DF	John McClelland	7 December 1955 (aged 30)	38	(England) Watford
19	FW	Billy Hamilton	9 May 1957 (aged 29)	38	(England) Oxford United
20	MF	Bernard McNally	17 February 1963 (aged 23)	1	(England) Shrewsbury Town
21	MF	David Campbell	2 June 1965 (aged 20)	1	(England) Nottingham Forest
22	FW	Mark Caughey	31 August 1960 (aged 25)	2	(Northern Ireland) Linfield

=== Spain ===
Head coach: Miguel Muñoz

No.	Pos.	Player	Date of birth (age)	Caps	Club
1	GK	Andoni Zubizarreta	23 October 1961 (aged 24)	9	(Spain) Athletic Bilbao
2	DF	Tomás	9 August 1960 (aged 25)	5	(Spain) Atlético Madrid
3	DF	José Antonio Camacho (captain)	8 June 1955 (aged 30)	64	(Spain) Real Madrid
4	DF	Antonio Maceda	16 May 1957 (aged 29)	35	(Spain) Real Madrid
5	MF	Víctor	15 March 1957 (aged 29)	36	(Spain) Barcelona
6	DF	Rafael Gordillo	24 February 1957 (aged 29)	62	(Spain) Real Madrid
7	MF	Juan Señor	26 August 1958 (aged 27)	29	(Spain) Real Zaragoza
8	DF	Andoni Goikoetxea	23 August 1956 (aged 29)	29	(Spain) Athletic Bilbao
9	FW	Emilio Butragueño	22 July 1963 (aged 22)	11	(Spain) Real Madrid
10	MF	Francisco José Carrasco	6 March 1959 (aged 27)	30	(Spain) Barcelona
11	DF	Julio Alberto	7 October 1958 (aged 27)	22	(Spain) Barcelona
12	MF	Quique Setién	27 September 1958 (aged 27)	3	(Spain) Atlético Madrid
13	GK	Urruti	17 February 1952 (aged 34)	5	(Spain) Barcelona
14	MF	Ricardo Gallego	8 February 1959 (aged 27)	26	(Spain) Real Madrid
15	DF	Chendo	12 October 1961 (aged 24)	1	(Spain) Real Madrid
16	FW	Hipólito Rincón	28 April 1957 (aged 29)	20	(Spain) Real Betis
17	MF	Francisco	1 November 1962 (aged 23)	14	(Spain) Sevilla
18	MF	Ramón Calderé	16 January 1959 (aged 27)	6	(Spain) Barcelona
19	FW	Julio Salinas	11 September 1962 (aged 23)	3	(Spain) Athletic Bilbao
20	FW	Eloy	10 July 1964 (aged 21)	3	(Spain) Sporting Gijón
21	MF	Míchel	23 March 1963 (aged 23)	5	(Spain) Real Madrid
22	GK	Juan Carlos Ablanedo	2 September 1963 (aged 22)	0	(Spain) Sporting Gijón

== Group E ==
=== Denmark ===
Head coach: (West Germany) Sepp Piontek

No.	Pos.	Player	Date of birth (age)	Caps	Club
1	GK	Troels Rasmussen	7 April 1961 (aged 25)	15	(Denmark) AGF
2	DF	John Sivebæk	25 October 1961 (aged 24)	36	(England) Manchester United
3	DF	Søren Busk	10 April 1953 (aged 33)	46	(Netherlands) MVV
4	DF	Morten Olsen (captain)	14 August 1949 (aged 36)	79	(Belgium) Anderlecht
5	DF	Ivan Nielsen	9 October 1956 (aged 29)	31	(Netherlands) Feyenoord
6	MF	Søren Lerby	1 February 1958 (aged 28)	51	(West Germany) Bayern Munich
7	MF	Jan Mølby	4 July 1963 (aged 22)	20	(England) Liverpool
8	MF	Jesper Olsen	20 March 1961 (aged 25)	26	(England) Manchester United
9	MF	Klaus Berggreen	3 February 1958 (aged 28)	32	(Italy) Pisa
10	FW	Preben Elkjær	11 September 1957 (aged 28)	56	(Italy) Hellas Verona
11	FW	Michael Laudrup	15 June 1964 (aged 21)	30	(Italy) Juventus
12	MF	Jens Jørn Bertelsen	15 February 1952 (aged 34)	58	(Switzerland) Aarau
13	MF	Per Frimann	4 June 1962 (aged 23)	10	(Belgium) Anderlecht
14	FW	Allan Simonsen	15 December 1952 (aged 33)	53	(Denmark) Vejle
15	MF	Frank Arnesen	30 September 1956 (aged 29)	45	(Netherlands) PSV
16	GK	Ole Qvist	25 February 1950 (aged 36)	38	(Denmark) KB
17	DF	Kent Nielsen	28 December 1961 (aged 24)	4	(Denmark) Brønshøj
18	FW	Flemming Christensen	10 April 1958 (aged 28)	10	(Denmark) Lyngby
19	FW	John Eriksen	20 November 1957 (aged 28)	5	(Netherlands) Feyenoord
20	MF	Jan Bartram	6 March 1962 (aged 24)	3	(Denmark) AGF
21	DF	Henrik Andersen	7 May 1965 (aged 21)	6	(Belgium) Anderlecht
22	GK	Lars Høgh	14 January 1959 (aged 27)	3	(Denmark) Odense

=== Scotland ===
Head coach: Alex Ferguson

No.	Pos.	Player	Date of birth (age)	Caps	Club
1	GK	Jim Leighton	24 July 1958 (aged 27)	26	(Scotland) Aberdeen
2	DF	Richard Gough	5 April 1962 (aged 24)	23	(Scotland) Dundee United
3	DF	Maurice Malpas	3 August 1962 (aged 23)	10	(Scotland) Dundee United
4	MF	Graeme Souness (captain)	6 May 1953 (aged 33)	52	(Italy) Sampdoria
5	DF	Alex McLeish	21 January 1959 (aged 27)	43	(Scotland) Aberdeen
6	DF	Willie Miller	2 May 1955 (aged 31)	48	(Scotland) Aberdeen
7	MF	Gordon Strachan	9 February 1957 (aged 29)	34	(England) Manchester United
8	DF	Roy Aitken	24 November 1958 (aged 27)	20	(Scotland) Celtic
9	MF	Eamonn Bannon	18 April 1958 (aged 28)	9	(Scotland) Dundee United
10	MF	Jim Bett	25 November 1959 (aged 26)	17	(Scotland) Aberdeen
11	MF	Paul McStay	22 October 1964 (aged 21)	14	(Scotland) Celtic
12	GK	Andy Goram	13 April 1964 (aged 22)	3	(England) Oldham Athletic
13	DF	Steve Nicol	11 December 1961 (aged 24)	8	(England) Liverpool
14	DF	David Narey	12 June 1956 (aged 29)	28	(Scotland) Dundee United
15	DF	Arthur Albiston	14 July 1957 (aged 28)	13	(England) Manchester United
16	FW	Frank McAvennie	22 November 1959 (aged 26)	2	(England) West Ham United
17	FW	Steve Archibald	27 September 1956 (aged 29)	26	(Spain) Barcelona
18	FW	Graeme Sharp	16 October 1960 (aged 25)	6	(England) Everton
19	FW	Charlie Nicholas	30 December 1961 (aged 24)	15	(England) Arsenal
20	FW	Paul Sturrock	10 October 1956 (aged 29)	17	(Scotland) Dundee United
21	FW	Davie Cooper	25 February 1956 (aged 30)	14	(Scotland) Rangers
22	GK	Alan Rough	25 November 1951 (aged 34)	53	(Scotland) Hibernian

=== Uruguay ===
Head coach: Omar Borrás

No.	Pos.	Player	Date of birth (age)	Caps	Club
1	GK	Rodolfo Rodríguez	20 January 1956 (aged 30)	78	(Brazil) Santos
2	DF	Nelson Gutiérrez	13 April 1962 (aged 24)	31	(Argentina) River Plate
3	DF	Eduardo Acevedo	25 September 1959 (aged 26)	37	(Uruguay) Defensor Sporting
4	DF	Víctor Diogo	9 April 1958 (aged 28)	31	(Brazil) Palmeiras
5	MF	Miguel Bossio	10 February 1960 (aged 26)	27	(Uruguay) Peñarol
6	DF	José Batista	6 March 1962 (aged 24)	8	(Argentina) Deportivo Español
7	FW	Antonio Alzamendi	7 June 1956 (aged 29)	6	(Argentina) River Plate
8	MF	Jorge Barrios (captain)	24 January 1961 (aged 25)	53	(Greece) Olympiacos
9	FW	Jorge da Silva	11 December 1961 (aged 24)	19	(Spain) Atlético Madrid
10	FW	Enzo Francescoli	12 November 1961 (aged 24)	22	(Argentina) River Plate
11	MF	Sergio Santín	6 August 1956 (aged 29)	14	(Colombia) Atlético Nacional
12	GK	Fernando Álvez	4 September 1959 (aged 26)	6	(Uruguay) Peñarol
13	DF	César Vega	2 September 1959 (aged 26)	7	(Uruguay) Danubio
14	DF	Darío Pereyra	19 October 1956 (aged 29)	31	(Brazil) São Paulo
15	DF	Eliseo Rivero	27 December 1957 (aged 28)	6	(Uruguay) Peñarol
16	MF	Mario Saralegui	24 April 1959 (aged 27)	26	(Uruguay) Peñarol
17	MF	José Zalazar	26 October 1963 (aged 22)	15	(Uruguay) Peñarol
18	MF	Rubén Paz	8 August 1959 (aged 26)	22	(Brazil) Internacional
19	FW	Venancio Ramos	20 June 1959 (aged 26)	36	(France) Lens
20	FW	Carlos Aguilera	21 September 1964 (aged 21)	38	(Uruguay) Nacional
21	FW	Wilmar Cabrera	31 July 1959 (aged 26)	24	(Spain) Valencia
22	GK	Celso Otero	1 February 1958 (aged 28)	0	(Uruguay) Montevideo Wanderers

=== West Germany ===
Head coach: Franz Beckenbauer

No.	Pos.	Player	Date of birth (age)	Caps	Club
1	GK	Harald Schumacher	6 March 1954 (aged 32)	67	(West Germany) 1. FC Köln
2	DF	Hans-Peter Briegel	11 October 1955 (aged 30)	66	(Italy) Hellas Verona
3	DF	Andreas Brehme	9 November 1960 (aged 25)	23	(West Germany) 1. FC Kaiserslautern
4	DF	Karlheinz Förster	25 July 1958 (aged 27)	74	(West Germany) VfB Stuttgart
5	DF	Matthias Herget	14 November 1955 (aged 30)	21	(West Germany) Bayer Uerdingen
6	DF	Norbert Eder	7 November 1955 (aged 30)	2	(West Germany) Bayern Munich
7	FW	Pierre Littbarski	16 April 1960 (aged 26)	40	(West Germany) 1. FC Köln
8	MF	Lothar Matthäus	21 March 1961 (aged 25)	41	(West Germany) Bayern Munich
9	FW	Rudi Völler	13 April 1960 (aged 26)	31	(West Germany) Werder Bremen
10	MF	Felix Magath	26 July 1953 (aged 32)	37	(West Germany) Hamburger SV
11	FW	Karl-Heinz Rummenigge (captain)	25 September 1955 (aged 30)	88	(Italy) Internazionale
12	GK	Uli Stein	23 October 1954 (aged 31)	6	(West Germany) Hamburger SV
13	MF	Karl Allgöwer	5 January 1957 (aged 29)	10	(West Germany) VfB Stuttgart
14	DF	Thomas Berthold	12 November 1964 (aged 21)	12	(West Germany) Eintracht Frankfurt
15	DF	Klaus Augenthaler	26 September 1957 (aged 28)	11	(West Germany) Bayern Munich
16	MF	Olaf Thon	1 May 1966 (aged 20)	10	(West Germany) Schalke 04
17	DF	Ditmar Jakobs	28 August 1953 (aged 32)	14	(West Germany) Hamburger SV
18	MF	Uwe Rahn	21 May 1962 (aged 24)	9	(West Germany) Borussia Mönchengladbach
19	FW	Klaus Allofs	5 December 1956 (aged 29)	40	(West Germany) 1. FC Köln
20	FW	Dieter Hoeneß	7 January 1953 (aged 33)	4	(West Germany) Bayern Munich
21	MF	Wolfgang Rolff	26 December 1959 (aged 26)	17	(West Germany) Hamburger SV
22	GK	Eike Immel	27 November 1960 (aged 25)	4	(West Germany) Borussia Dortmund

== Group F ==
=== England ===
Head coach: Bobby Robson

No.	Pos.	Player	Date of birth (age)	Caps	Club
1	GK	Peter Shilton	18 September 1949 (aged 36)	81	(England) Southampton
2	DF	Gary M. Stevens	27 March 1963 (aged 23)	9	(England) Everton
3	DF	Kenny Sansom	26 September 1958 (aged 27)	65	(England) Arsenal
4	MF	Glenn Hoddle	27 October 1957 (aged 28)	33	(England) Tottenham Hotspur
5	DF	Alvin Martin	29 July 1958 (aged 27)	15	(England) West Ham United
6	DF	Terry Butcher	28 December 1958 (aged 27)	40	(England) Ipswich Town
7	MF	Bryan Robson (captain)	11 January 1957 (aged 29)	51	(England) Manchester United
8	MF	Ray Wilkins	14 September 1956 (aged 29)	80	(Italy) Milan
9	FW	Mark Hateley	7 November 1961 (aged 24)	18	(Italy) Milan
10	FW	Gary Lineker	30 November 1960 (aged 25)	13	(England) Everton
11	MF	Chris Waddle	14 December 1960 (aged 25)	16	(England) Tottenham Hotspur
12	DF	Viv Anderson	29 July 1956 (aged 29)	21	(England) Arsenal
13	GK	Chris Woods	14 November 1959 (aged 26)	4	(England) Norwich City
14	DF	Terry Fenwick	17 November 1959 (aged 26)	15	(England) Queens Park Rangers
15	DF	Gary A. Stevens	30 March 1962 (aged 24)	5	(England) Tottenham Hotspur
16	MF	Peter Reid	20 June 1956 (aged 29)	6	(England) Everton
17	MF	Trevor Steven	21 September 1963 (aged 22)	10	(England) Everton
18	MF	Steve Hodge	25 October 1962 (aged 23)	3	(England) Aston Villa
19	MF	John Barnes	7 November 1963 (aged 22)	27	(England) Watford
20	FW	Peter Beardsley	18 January 1961 (aged 25)	5	(England) Newcastle United
21	FW	Kerry Dixon	24 July 1961 (aged 24)	6	(England) Chelsea
22	GK	Gary Bailey	9 August 1958 (aged 27)	2	(England) Manchester United

=== Morocco ===
Head coach: (Brazil) José Faria

No.	Pos.	Player	Date of birth (age)	Caps	Club
1	GK	Ezzaki Badou (captain)	2 April 1959 (aged 27)	62	(Morocco) Wydad Casablanca
2	DF	Labid Khalifa	1 January 1955 (aged 31)	1	(Morocco) Kenitra
3	DF	Abdelmajid Lamriss	12 February 1959 (aged 27)	32	(Morocco) FAR Rabat
4	DF	Mustapha El Biyaz	12 December 1960 (aged 25)	33	(Morocco) KAC Marrakesh
5	DF	Noureddine Bouyahyaoui	7 January 1955 (aged 31)	44	(Morocco) Kenitra
6	MF	Abdelmajid Dolmy	19 April 1953 (aged 33)	63	(Morocco) Raja Casablanca
7	MF	Mustafa El Haddaoui	28 July 1961 (aged 24)	28	(Switzerland) Lausanne
8	MF	Aziz Bouderbala	26 December 1960 (aged 25)	42	(Switzerland) Sion
9	FW	Abdelkrim Merry "Krimau"	13 January 1955 (aged 31)	1	(France) Le Havre
10	MF	Mohamed Timoumi	15 January 1960 (aged 26)	53	(Morocco) FAR Rabat
11	FW	Mustafa Merry	21 April 1958 (aged 28)	4	(France) Valenciennes
12	GK	Salahdine Hmied	1 September 1961 (aged 24)	?	(Morocco) FAR Rabat
13	FW	Abdelfettah Rhiati	25 February 1963 (aged 23)	1	(Morocco) Maghreb Fez
14	DF	Lahcen Ouadani	14 July 1959 (aged 26)	36	(Morocco) FAR Rabat
15	MF	Mouncif El Haddaoui	21 October 1964 (aged 21)	?	(Morocco) AS Sale
16	MF	Azzedine Amanallah	7 April 1956 (aged 30)	?	(France) Besançon
17	FW	Abderrazak Khairi	20 November 1962 (aged 23)	1	(Morocco) FAR Rabat
18	MF	Mohammed Sahil	11 October 1963 (aged 22)	?	(Morocco) KAC Marrakesh
19	MF	Fadel Jilal	4 March 1964 (aged 22)	0	(Morocco) Wydad Casablanca
20	DF	Abdellah Bidane	10 September 1965 (aged 20)	?	(Morocco) CODM Meknes
21	MF	Abdelaziz Souleimani	30 April 1958 (aged 28)	1	(Morocco) Maghreb Fez
22	GK	Abdelfettah Mouddani	30 July 1956 (aged 29)	?	(Morocco) Kenitra

=== Poland ===
Head coach: Antoni Piechniczek

No.	Pos.	Player	Date of birth (age)	Caps	Club
1	GK	Józef Młynarczyk	20 September 1953 (aged 32)	38	(Portugal) Porto
2	DF	Kazimierz Przybyś	11 July 1960 (aged 25)	9	(Poland) Widzew Łódź
3	DF	Władysław Żmuda	6 June 1954 (aged 31)	90	(Italy) Cremonese
4	DF	Marek Ostrowski	22 November 1959 (aged 26)	26	(Poland) Pogoń Szczecin
5	DF	Roman Wójcicki	8 January 1958 (aged 28)	49	(Poland) Widzew Łódź
6	MF	Waldemar Matysik	27 September 1961 (aged 24)	42	(Poland) Górnik Zabrze
7	MF	Ryszard Tarasiewicz	27 April 1962 (aged 24)	12	(Poland) Śląsk Wrocław
8	FW	Jan Urban	14 May 1962 (aged 24)	13	(Poland) Górnik Zabrze
9	MF	Jan Karaś	17 March 1959 (aged 27)	6	(Poland) Legia Warsaw
10	DF	Stefan Majewski	31 January 1956 (aged 30)	36	(West Germany) 1. FC Kaiserslautern
11	MF	Włodzimierz Smolarek	16 July 1957 (aged 28)	48	(Poland) Widzew Łódź
12	GK	Jacek Kazimierski	17 August 1959 (aged 26)	16	(Poland) Legia Warsaw
13	MF	Ryszard Komornicki	14 August 1959 (aged 26)	14	(Poland) Górnik Zabrze
14	DF	Dariusz Kubicki	6 June 1963 (aged 22)	11	(Poland) Legia Warsaw
15	MF	Andrzej Buncol	21 September 1959 (aged 26)	49	(Poland) Legia Warsaw
16	MF	Andrzej Pałasz	22 July 1960 (aged 25)	34	(Poland) Górnik Zabrze
17	FW	Andrzej Zgutczyński	1 January 1958 (aged 28)	4	(Poland) Górnik Zabrze
18	DF	Krzysztof Pawlak	12 February 1958 (aged 28)	22	(Poland) Lech Poznań
19	GK	Józef Wandzik	13 August 1963 (aged 22)	3	(Poland) Górnik Zabrze
20	MF	Zbigniew Boniek (captain)	3 March 1956 (aged 30)	74	(Italy) Roma
21	FW	Dariusz Dziekanowski	30 September 1962 (aged 23)	33	(Poland) Legia Warsaw
22	FW	Jan Furtok	9 March 1962 (aged 24)	4	(Poland) GKS Katowice

=== Portugal ===
Head coach: José Torres

No.	Pos.	Player	Date of birth (age)	Caps	Club
1	GK	Manuel Bento (captain)	25 June 1948 (aged 37)	62	(Portugal) Benfica
2	DF	João Pinto	21 November 1961 (aged 24)	22	(Portugal) Porto
3	MF	António Sousa	28 April 1957 (aged 29)	17	(Portugal) Sporting CP
4	MF	José Ribeiro	2 November 1957 (aged 28)	2	(Portugal) Boavista
5	DF	Álvaro	3 January 1961 (aged 25)	11	(Portugal) Benfica
6	MF	Carlos Manuel	15 January 1958 (aged 28)	39	(Portugal) Benfica
7	MF	Jaime Pacheco	22 July 1958 (aged 27)	21	(Portugal) Sporting CP
8	DF	Frederico	6 April 1957 (aged 29)	5	(Portugal) Boavista
9	FW	Fernando Gomes	22 November 1956 (aged 29)	42	(Portugal) Porto
10	FW	Paulo Futre	28 February 1966 (aged 20)	10	(Portugal) Porto
11	DF	Fernando Bandeirinha	26 November 1962 (aged 23)	0	(Portugal) Académica de Coimbra
12	GK	Jorge Martins	22 August 1954 (aged 31)	0	(Portugal) Belenenses
13	DF	António Morato	6 November 1964 (aged 21)	4	(Portugal) Sporting CP
14	MF	Jaime Magalhães	10 July 1962 (aged 23)	7	(Portugal) Porto
15	DF	António Oliveira	8 June 1958 (aged 27)	1	(Portugal) Benfica
16	DF	José António	29 October 1957 (aged 28)	2	(Portugal) Belenenses
17	MF	Diamantino	3 August 1959 (aged 26)	19	(Portugal) Benfica
18	DF	Luís Sobrinho	5 May 1961 (aged 25)	0	(Portugal) Belenenses
19	FW	Rui Águas	28 April 1960 (aged 26)	3	(Portugal) Benfica
20	DF	Augusto Inácio	1 February 1955 (aged 31)	22	(Portugal) Porto
21	MF	António André	24 December 1957 (aged 28)	5	(Portugal) Porto
22	GK	Vítor Damas	8 October 1947 (aged 38)	27	(Portugal) Sporting CP

== Notes ==
Each national team had to submit a squad of 22 players. All the teams included three goalkeepers, except Bulgaria and South Korea, who only called two.

== Coaches representation by country ==
No.	Country	Coaches
3	Brazil	José Faria (Morocco), Evaristo (Iraq), Telê Santana
2	England	Bobby Robson, Tony Waiters (Canada)
2	West Germany	Franz Beckenbauer, Sepp Piontek (Denmark)
1	Algeria	Rabah Saâdane
1	Argentina	Carlos Bilardo
1	Belgium	Guy Thys
1	Bulgaria	Ivan Vutsov
1	France	Henri Michel
1	Hungary	György Mezey
1	Italy	Enzo Bearzot
1	Northern Ireland	Billy Bingham
1	Paraguay	Cayetano Ré
1	Poland	Antoni Piechniczek
1	Portugal	José Torres
1	Scotland	Alex Ferguson
1	South Korea	Kim Jung-nam
1	Soviet Union	Valeriy Lobanovskyi
1	Spain	Miguel Muñoz
1	Uruguay	Omar Borrás
1	(Socialist Federal Republic of Yugoslavia) Yugoslavia	Bora Milutinović (Mexico)
