= 1986 African Cup of Nations squads =

Below is a list of squads used in the 1986 African Cup of Nations.

== Group A ==
=== Ivory Coast ===
Coach: (France) Pancho Gonzalès

No.	Pos.	Player	Date of birth (age)	Caps	Goals	Club
1	GK	Zagouli Gbolié	1961			(Ivorian Football Federation) Africa Sports
	DF	Leopold Abialy	1964			(Ivorian Football Federation) Africa Sports
	DF	Boris Diecket	31 March 1963 (aged 22)			(French Football Federation) Tours
	DF	Emile Gnahoré				(Ivorian Football Federation) Africa Sports
	DF	Patrice Lago				(Ivorian Football Federation) Africa Sports
	DF	François Monguéhi	29 November 1962 (aged 23)			(Ivorian Football Federation) ASEC Mimosas
	DF	Laurent Zahui	10 August 1960 (aged 25)			(French Football Federation) Angoulême
12	MF	Oumar Ben Salah	2 July 1964 (aged 21)			(Ivorian Football Federation) Stade d'Abidjan
7	MF	Saint-Joseph Gadji-Celi	1 May 1961 (aged 24)			(Ivorian Football Federation) ASEC Mimosas
	MF	Pascal Miézan	3 April 1959 (aged 26)			(Royal Belgian Football Association) Lierse
	MF	Pascal Kouassi N'Dri				(Ivorian Football Federation) Africa Sports
	MF	François Zahoui	21 August 1962 (aged 23)			(French Football Federation) Nancy
20	FW	Youssouf Falikou Fofana	26 July 1966 (aged 19)			(French Football Federation) AS Monaco
10	FW	Abdoulaye Traoré	4 March 1967 (aged 19)			(Portuguese Football Federation) Braga
	FW	Aboubacar N'Diaye				(Ivorian Football Federation) ASEC Mimosas

=== Egypt ===
Coach: (England) Mike Smith

No.	Pos.	Player	Date of birth (age)	Caps	Goals	Club
1	GK	Thabet El-Batal	16 September 1953 (aged 32)			(Egyptian Football Association) Al Ahly SC
19	GK	Ahmed Shobair	28 September 1960 (aged 25)			(Egyptian Football Association) Al Ahly SC
22	GK	Adel El Maamour	11 November 1955 (aged 30)			(Egyptian Football Association) Zamalek SC
2	DF	Ali Shehata	25 April 1959 (aged 26)			(Egyptian Football Association) Al Mokawloon Al Arab
21	DF	Hamada Sedki	25 August 1961 (aged 24)			(Egyptian Football Association) El Minya SC
17	DF	Ahmed Ramzy	25 July 1965 (aged 20)			(Egyptian Football Association) Zamalek SC
5	DF	Mohamed Omar	3 September 1958 (aged 27)			(Egyptian Football Association) Al Ittihad Alexandria
6	DF	Ashraf Kasem	25 July 1966 (aged 19)			(Egyptian Football Association) Zamalek SC
3	DF	Rabie Yassin	7 September 1960 (aged 25)			(Egyptian Football Association) Al Ahly SC
15	DF	Moustafa Aboul Dahab	15 December 1961 (aged 24)			(Egyptian Football Association) Al Masry SC
8	MF	Magdi Abdelghani	27 July 1959 (aged 26)			(Egyptian Football Association) Al Ahly SC
4	MF	Alaa Mayhoub	19 January 1963 (aged 23)			(Egyptian Football Association) Al Ahly SC
13	MF	Shawky Ghareeb	26 February 1959 (aged 27)			(Egyptian Football Association) Ghazl El Mahalla SC
9	MF	Nasser El-Tallis	24 November 1957 (aged 28)			(Egyptian Football Association) Ghazl El Mahalla SC
11	MF	Tarek Yehia	10 September 1961 (aged 24)			(Egyptian Football Association) Zamalek SC
12	MF	Taher Abouzeid	1 April 1962 (aged 23)			(Egyptian Football Association) Al Ahly SC
20	FW	Hossam Hassan	10 August 1966 (aged 19)			(Egyptian Football Association) Al Ahly SC
10	FW	Mahmoud Al Khatib	30 October 1954 (aged 31)			(Egyptian Football Association) Al Ahly SC
7	FW	Moustafa Abdou (c)	10 January 1953 (aged 33)			(Egyptian Football Association) Al Ahly SC
18	FW	Emad Soliman	23 July 1959 (aged 26)			(Egyptian Football Association) Ismaily SC
16	FW	Mohamed Hazem	7 June 1960 (aged 25)			(Egyptian Football Association) Ismaily SC
14	FW	Gamal Abdelhamid	24 November 1957 (aged 28)			(Egyptian Football Association) Zamalek SC

=== Mozambique ===
Coach: Manaca

No.	Pos.	Player	Date of birth (age)	Caps	Goals	Club
	GK	Filipe Chissequere	5 June 1957 (aged 28)			(Mozambican Football Federation) Maxaquene
	DF	Elcídio Conde	1961			(Mozambican Football Federation) Maxaquene
	MF	Joaquim João	1 October 1952 (aged 33)			(Mozambican Football Federation) Ferroviário
	DF	Armando Faruk Ali				(Mozambican Football Federation)
	MF	Santinho Matonse				(Mozambican Football Federation) Maxaquene
	MF	Manuel Siname				(Mozambican Football Federation)
	DF	Manuel Cossa				(Mozambican Football Federation) Maxaquene
	FW	Mabota Ferreira	19 October 1960 (aged 25)			(Mozambican Football Federation) Maxaquene
	MF	Amade Chamabe	18 August 1958 (aged 27)			(Mozambican Football Federation) Desportivo Maputo
	MF	Lucas Barrarijo	5 January 1960 (aged 26)			(Mozambican Football Federation)
	FW	Nico de Souza	1962			(Mozambican Football Federation) Maxaquene
	FW	Geraldo Conde	18 April 1959 (aged 26)			(Mozambican Football Federation) Maxaquene
	FW	Chiquinho Conde	22 November 1965 (aged 20)			(Mozambican Football Federation) Maxaquene
	MF	Jerónimo Nhanombe				(Mozambican Football Federation) Maxaquene
	FW	Calton Banze	26 January 1957 (aged 29)			(Mozambican Football Federation) Desportivo Maputo
	DF	Antonio Machava	10 January 1960 (aged 26)			(Mozambican Football Federation) Costa do Sol
	DF	Sinane Almeida	1957			(Mozambican Football Federation)

=== Senegal ===
Coach: Pape Alioune Diop

No.	Pos.	Player	Date of birth (age)	Caps	Goals	Club
1	GK	Cheikh Seck	8 January 1958 (aged 28)			(Tunisian Football Federation) Stade Tunisien
	DF	Pape Fall	19 January 1960 (aged 26)			(Senegalese Football Federation) Seib Diourbel
	DF	Racine Amadou Kané	27 February 1960 (aged 26)			(Senegalese Football Federation) Seib Diourbel
	DF	Roger Mendy	8 February 1960 (aged 26)			(Senegalese Football Federation) ASC Jeanne d'Arc
	DF	Mamadou Tew	27 November 1959 (aged 26)			(Royal Belgian Football Association) Club Brugge
	DF	Oumar Touré	14 March 1954 (aged 31)			(French Football Federation) US Maubege
	MF	Amadou Diop				(Senegalese Football Federation) ASC Diaraf
	MF	Joseph Koto	1 January 1960 (aged 26)			(Senegalese Football Federation) ASC Jeanne d'Arc
	MF	Christophe Sagna	5 May 1954 (aged 31)			(French Football Federation) Quimper
	MF	Oumar Sène	23 October 1959 (aged 26)			(French Football Federation) Paris SG
10	FW	Jules Bocandé	25 November 1958 (aged 27)			(French Football Federation) Metz
	FW	Boubacar Saar	20 June 1951 (aged 34)			(French Football Federation) Martigues
11	FW	Thierno Youm	17 April 1960 (aged 25)			(French Football Federation) Laval
	FW	Salif Diagne				(Senegalese Football Federation) ASC Jeanne d'Arc
	FW	Cheikh Tidiane Fall				(Senegalese Football Federation)

== Group B ==
=== Algeria ===
Coach: Rabah Saâdane

No.	Pos.	Player	Date of birth (age)	Caps	Club
1	GK	Mehdi Cerbah	3 April 1953 (aged 32)		(Algeria) RS Kouba
2	DF	Mahmoud Guendouz	24 February 1953 (aged 33)		(Algeria) JS El Biar
3	DF	Faouzi Mansouri	17 January 1956 (aged 30)		(France) Montpellier
4	DF	Fodil Megharia	23 May 1961 (aged 24)		(Algeria) ASO Chlef
5	DF	Chaabane Merzekane	8 March 1959 (aged 26)		(Algeria) MA Hussein Dey
6	MF	Mohamed Kaci Said	2 May 1958 (aged 27)		(Algeria) RS Kouba
7	FW	Nasser Bouiche	8 June 1960 (aged 25)		(Algeria) MP Alger
8	MF	Ali Fergani (c)	21 September 1952 (aged 33)		(Algeria) JE Tizi-Ouzou
9	FW	Djamel Menad	22 July 1960 (aged 25)		(Algeria) JE Tizi-Ouzou
10	FW	Rabah Madjer	15 December 1958 (aged 27)		(Portugal) Porto
11	FW	Tedj Bensaoula	1 December 1954 (aged 31)		(France) Le Havre
12	FW	Nacer Bouiche	16 May 1963 (aged 22)		(Algeria) JE Tizi-Ouzou
13	MF	Hocine Yahi	25 April 1960 (aged 25)		(Algeria) CM Belcourt
14	FW	Hakim Medane	5 September 1966 (aged 19)		(Algeria) USM El Harrach
15	DF	Abdelhamid Sadmi	1 January 1961 (aged 25)		(Algeria) JE Tizi-Ouzou
16	MF	Karim Maroc	5 March 1958 (aged 28)		(France) Montpellier
17	FW	Fawzi Benkhalidi	3 February 1963 (aged 23)		(Algeria) WKF Boufarik
18	DF	Mokhtar Kechamli	2 November 1962 (aged 23)		(Algeria) ASC Oran
19	DF	Mohammed Chaib	20 May 1957 (aged 28)		(Algeria) RS Kouba
21	GK	Nacerdine Drid	22 January 1957 (aged 29)		(Algeria) MP Oran

=== Cameroon ===
Coach: (France) Claude Le Roy

No.	Pos.	Player	Date of birth (age)	Caps	Club
1	GK	Thomas Nkono	20 July 1955 (aged 30)		(Spain) Espanyol
21	GK	Jacques Songo'o	17 March 1964 (aged 21)		(Cameroon) Canon Yaoundé
	GK	Andre Boe	24 October 1962 (aged 24)		(Cameroon) Tonnerre Yaoundé
4	DF	Ibrahim Aoudou	23 August 1955 (aged 30)		(France) Besançon
6	DF	Emmanuel Kundé	15 July 1956 (aged 29)		(Cameroon) Canon Yaoundé
5	DF	Victor Ndip Akem	18 August 1967 (aged 18)		(Cameroon) Union Douala
15	DF	Edmond Enoka	17 December 1955 (aged 30)		(Cameroon) Union Douala
	DF	Bertin Ebwellé	11 September 1962 (aged 23)		(Cameroon) Tonnerre Yaoundé
	DF	Charles Toubé	22 January 1958 (aged 28)		(Cameroon) Tonnerre Yaoundé
3	DF	Isaac Sinkot	11 July 1954 (aged 31)		(Cameroon) Dynamo Douala
	DF	Christian Ebwéa Bilé			(Cameroon) Union Douala
18	DF	Salomon Voungai			(Cameroon)
	MF	Théophile Abega	9 July 1954 (aged 31)		(Switzerland) Vevey Sports
2	MF	André Kana-Biyik	1 September 1965 (aged 20)		(Cameroon) Union Douala
20	MF	Grégoire Mbida	27 January 1952 (aged 34)		(France) Dunkerque
8	MF	Emile Mbouh-Mbouh	30 May 1966 (aged 21)		(Cameroon) Union Douala
11	MF	Louis-Paul Mfédé	26 February 1961 (aged 25)		(France) Rennes
	MF	Jean-Jacques Missé-Missé	7 August 1968 (aged 17)		(Cameroon) Canon Yaoundé
7	MF	Mamoudou Oumarou			(Cameroon) Union Douala
13	FW	Ernest Ebongué	15 May 1962 (aged 23)		(Cameroon) Tonnerre Yaoundé
9	FW	Roger Milla	20 May 1952 (aged 33)		(France) Saint-Étienne
10	FW	Dagobert Dang	6 February 1958 (aged 28)		(Cameroon) Canon Yaoundé

=== Morocco ===
Coach: (Brazil) José Faria [[]]

No.	Pos.	Player	Date of birth (age)	Caps	Club
1	GK	Badou Ezzaki (captain)	2 April 1959 (aged 26)		(Morocco) Wydad Casablanca
12	GK	Salahdine Hmied	1 September 1961 (aged 24)		(Morocco) FAR Rabat
22	GK	Abdelfettah Mouddani	30 July 1956 (aged 29)		(Morocco) Kenitra
5	DF	Norredine Bouyahyaoui	7 January 1955 (aged 31)		(Morocco) Kenitra
4	DF	Mustapha El Biyaz	12 February 1960 (aged 26)		(Morocco) KAC Marrakech
2	DF	Labid Khalifa	1955		(Morocco) Kenitra
3	DF	Abdelmajid Lamriss	12 February 1959 (aged 27)		(Morocco) FAR Rabat
14	DF	Lahcen Ouadani	14 July 1959 (aged 26)		(Morocco) FAR Rabat
10	MF	Aziz Bouderbala	26 December 1960 (aged 25)		(Switzerland) Sion
6	MF	Abdelmajid Dolmy	19 April 1953 (aged 32)		(Morocco) Raja Casablanca
15	MF	Mouncif El Haddaoui	21 October 1964 (aged 21)		(Morocco) Association Salé
	MF	Mustafa El Haddaoui	28 July 1961 (aged 24)		(Switzerland) Lausanne-Sport
	MF	Jamal Jebrane	20 August 1957 (aged 28)		(Morocco) Kenitra
18	MF	Mohammed Sahil	11 October 1963 (aged 22)		(Morocco) KAC Marrakech
11	MF	Abdelaziz Souleimani	30 April 1958 (aged 27)		(Morocco) Maghreb Fez
8	FW	Abderrazak Khairi	20 November 1962 (aged 23)		(Morocco) FAR Rabat
17	FW	Khalid Labied	24 August 1955 (aged 30)		(Morocco) FUS de Rabat
9	FW	Abdelkrim "Krimau" Merry	13 January 1955 (aged 31)		(France) Le Havre
13	FW	Abdelfettah Rhiati	25 February 1963 (aged 23)		(Morocco) Maghreb Fez
	DF	Abdellah Bidane	19 August 1967 (aged 18)		(Morocco) CODM
20	MF	Hammou Fadhili	26 October 1957 (aged 28)		(Morocco) FAR Rabat
16	MF	Abdelatif Yakdani	24 August 1955 (aged 30)		(Morocco) DH El Jadidi

=== Zambia ===
Coach: Brightwell Banda

No.	Pos.	Player	Date of birth (age)	Caps	Goals	Club
1	GK	David Chabala	2 February 1960 (aged 26)			(Football Association of Zambia) Mufulira Wanderers
16	GK	Peter Banda				(Football Association of Zambia)
8	DF	Laban Chishala				(Football Association of Zambia) Green Buffaloes
12	DF	Ashious Melu	6 June 1957 (aged 28)			(Football Association of Zambia) Mufulira Wanderers
5	DF	Jones Chilengi	30 January 1955 (aged 31)			(Football Association of Zambia) Green Buffaloes
3	DF	Kapambwe Mulenga	1963			(Football Association of Zambia) Nkana Red Devils
18	DF	Webby Chilufya				(Football Association of Zambia)
6	MF	Jericho Shinde	20 December 1959 (aged 26)			(Football Association of Zambia) Nkana Red Devils
7	MF	Derby Makinka	5 September 1965 (aged 20)			(Football Association of Zambia) Profound Warriors
14	MF	Charly Musonda	22 August 1969 (aged 16)			(Football Association of Zambia) Mufulira Wanderers
	FW	Lackson Chanda	1960			(Football Association of Zambia) Vitafoam United Ndola
13	MF	Wisdom Mumba Chansa	17 April 1964 (aged 21)			(Football Association of Zambia) Power Dynamos
10	MF	Jack Chanda	16 June 1958 (aged 27)			(Football Association of Zambia) Kabwe Warriors
15	MF	Chilufya Mwenya				(Football Association of Zambia) Vitafoam United Ndola
4	FW	Michael Chabala				(Football Association of Zambia) Nkana Red Devils
11	FW	Kalusha Bwalya	16 August 1963 (aged 22)			(Royal Belgian Football Association) Cercle Brugge
9	FW	Boniface Chanda				(Football Association of Zambia) Vitafoam United Ndola
