= 1986 FIFA World Cup Group F =

Football tournament group stage

Group F of the 1986 FIFA World Cup was one of the groups of the 1986 FIFA World Cup. The group's first round of matches began on 2 June and its last matches were played on 11 June. Most matches were played at the Estadio Universitario and the Estadio Tecnológico in Monterrey. After the first four matches yielded just two goals, locals dubbed it the "Group of Sleep". Morocco surprisingly topped the group, joined in the second round by England and Poland. Portugal were the other team in this group, making their first appearance since 1966.

Morocco drew their first two matches 0–0 against Poland and England, while Portugal defeated England in their opening match 1–0, but were themselves beaten by Poland by the same scoreline. England's match against Morocco featured their first sending-off in a World Cup, when Ray Wilkins was shown a red card after throwing the ball which struck the referee when an offside decision went against England. Thus, Poland led the group after two games, with Portugal in second place on goals scored. However, England defeated Poland 3–0 with a first half hat-trick from Gary Lineker to take second place behind Morocco, who beat Portugal 3–1 with goals from Abderrazak Khairi and Abdelkrim Merry. Poland, in third, only qualified for the second round as one of the four best third-place finishers.

== Standings ==
Pos	Team	Pld	W	D	L	GF	GA	GD	Pts	Qualification
1	Morocco	3	1	2	0	3	1	+2	4	Advance to knockout stage
2	England	3	1	1	1	3	1	+2	3	Advance to knockout stage
3	Poland	3	1	1	1	1	3	−2	3	Advance to knockout stage
4	Portugal	3	1	0	2	2	4	−2	2	

Source: FIFA

== Matches ==
=== Morocco vs Poland ===
2 June 1986
16:00 CST

Morocco	0–0	Poland

Estadio Universitario, San Nicolás de los Garza
Attendance: 19,900
Referee: José Luis Martínez Bazán (Uruguay)

Morocco	Poland

GK	1	Badou Zaki (c)
RB	2	Labid Khalifa
CB	4	Mustafa El Biyaz
CB	5	Noureddine Bouyahyaoui
LB	3	Abdelmajid Lamriss
DM	6	Abdelmajid Dolmy
CM	7	Mustafa El Haddaoui		(substituted off) 87'
CM	10	Mohammed Timoumi	(yellow card) 33'	(substituted off) 88'
AM	8	Aziz Bouderbala
CF	9	Abdelkrim Merry
CF	11	Mustafa Merry
Substitutions:
MF	21	Abdelaziz Souleimani		(substituted on) 87'
FW	17	Abderrazak Khairi		(substituted on) 88'
Manager:
(Brazil) José Faria

GK	1	Józef Młynarczyk
SW	5	Roman Wójcicki
RB	14	Dariusz Kubicki	(substituted off) 46'
CB	10	Stefan Majewski
LB	4	Marek Ostrowski
DM	6	Waldemar Matysik
CM	15	Andrzej Buncol
CM	20	Zbigniew Boniek (c)
CM	13	Ryszard Komornicki
CF	21	Dariusz Dziekanowski	(substituted off) 56'
CF	11	Włodzimierz Smolarek
Substitutions:
DF	2	Kazimierz Przybyś	(substituted on) 46'
FW	8	Jan Urban	(substituted on) 56'
Manager:
(Poland) Antoni Piechniczek

=== Portugal vs England ===
3 June 1986
16:00 CST

Portugal	1–0	England
Carlos Manuel 75'

Estadio Tecnológico, Monterrey
Attendance: 23,000
Referee: Volker Roth (West Germany)

Portugal	England

GK	1	Manuel Bento (c)
RB	5	Álvaro
CB	8	Frederico
CB	15	António Oliveira
LB	20	Augusto Inácio
DM	7	Jaime Pacheco	(yellow card) 88'
CM	21	António André
CM	3	António Sousa
AM	6	Carlos Manuel
RW	17	Diamantino		(substituted off) 82'
CF	9	Fernando Gomes		(substituted off) 73'
Substitutions:
MF	10	Paulo Futre		(substituted on) 73'
DF	16	José António		(substituted on) 82'
Manager:
(Portugal) José Torres

GK	1	Peter Shilton
RB	2	Gary Stevens
CB	14	Terry Fenwick	(yellow card) 17'
CB	6	Terry Butcher	(yellow card) 78'
LB	3	Kenny Sansom
CM	4	Glenn Hoddle
CM	8	Ray Wilkins
CM	7	Bryan Robson (c)		(substituted off) 80'
LW	11	Chris Waddle		(substituted off) 80'
CF	10	Gary Lineker
CF	9	Mark Hateley
Substitutions:
MF	18	Steve Hodge		(substituted on) 80'
FW	20	Peter Beardsley		(substituted on) 80'
Manager:
(England) Bobby Robson

=== England vs Morocco ===
6 June 1986
16:00 CST

England	0–0	Morocco

Estadio Tecnológico, Monterrey
Attendance: 20,200
Referee: Gabriel González (Paraguay)

England	Morocco

GK	1	Peter Shilton
RB	2	Gary Stevens
CB	14	Terry Fenwick
CB	6	Terry Butcher
LB	3	Kenny Sansom
CM	4	Glenn Hoddle
CM	8	Ray Wilkins	(yellow card) 40' (red card) 42'
CM	7	Bryan Robson (c)		(substituted off) 41'
LW	11	Chris Waddle
CF	10	Gary Lineker
CF	9	Mark Hateley	(yellow card) 69'	(substituted off) 76'
Substitutions:
MF	18	Steve Hodge		(substituted on) 41'
DF	15	Gary A. Stevens		(substituted on) 76'
Manager:
(England) Bobby Robson

GK	1	Badou Zaki (c)
RB	2	Labid Khalifa	(yellow card) 50'
CB	4	Mustafa El Biyaz
CB	5	Noureddine Bouyahyaoui
LB	3	Abdelmajid Lamriss		(substituted off) 73'
CM	6	Abdelmajid Dolmy
CM	10	Mohammed Timoumi
CM	17	Abderrazak Khairi	(yellow card) 76'
RW	8	Aziz Bouderbala
CF	9	Abdelkrim Merry
LW	11	Mustafa Merry		(substituted off) 87'
Substitutions:
DF	14	Lahcen Ouadani		(substituted on) 73'
MF	21	Abdelaziz Souleimani		(substituted on) 87'
Manager:
(Brazil) José Faria

=== Poland vs Portugal ===
7 June 1986
16:00 CST

Poland	1–0	Portugal
Smolarek 68'

Estadio Universitario, San Nicolás de los Garza
Attendance: 19,915
Referee: Ali Bin Nasser (Tunisia)

Poland	Portugal

GK	1	Józef Młynarczyk
SW	5	Roman Wójcicki	(yellow card) 46'
RB	18	Krzysztof Pawlak
CB	10	Stefan Majewski
LB	4	Marek Ostrowski
DM	6	Waldemar Matysik
CM	21	Dariusz Dziekanowski	(yellow card) 89'
CM	13	Ryszard Komornicki		(substituted off) 57'
CM	8	Jan Urban
CF	20	Zbigniew Boniek (c)
CF	11	Włodzimierz Smolarek		(substituted off) 74'
Substitutions:
MF	9	Jan Karaś		(substituted on) 57'
FW	17	Andrzej Zgutczyński		(substituted on) 74'
Manager:
(Poland) Antoni Piechniczek

GK	22	Vítor Damas
RB	5	Álvaro
CB	8	Frederico
CB	15	António Oliveira
LB	20	Augusto Inácio
DM	7	Jaime Pacheco
CM	21	António André	(substituted off) 72'
CM	3	António Sousa
AM	6	Carlos Manuel
RW	17	Diamantino
CF	9	Fernando Gomes (c)	(substituted off) 46'
Substitutions:
MF	10	Paulo Futre	(substituted on) 46'
MF	14	Jaime Magalhães	(substituted on) 72'
Manager:
(Portugal) José Torres

=== England vs Poland ===
11 June 1986
16:00 CST

England	3–0	Poland
Lineker 8', 14', 36'

Estadio Universitario, San Nicolás de los Garza
Attendance: 22,700
Referee: André Daina (Switzerland)

England	Poland

GK	1	Peter Shilton (c)
RB	2	Gary Stevens
CB	14	Terry Fenwick	(yellow card) 52'
CB	6	Terry Butcher
LB	3	Kenny Sansom
RM	17	Trevor Steven
CM	4	Glenn Hoddle
CM	16	Peter Reid
LM	18	Steve Hodge
SS	20	Peter Beardsley		(substituted off) 75'
CF	10	Gary Lineker		(substituted off) 86'
Substitutions:
MF	11	Chris Waddle		(substituted on) 75'
FW	21	Kerry Dixon		(substituted on) 86'
Manager:
(England) Bobby Robson

GK	1	Józef Młynarczyk
SW	5	Roman Wójcicki
RB	18	Krzysztof Pawlak
CB	10	Stefan Majewski
LB	4	Marek Ostrowski
DM	6	Waldemar Matysik	(substituted off) 46'
CM	13	Ryszard Komornicki	(substituted off) 22'
CM	21	Dariusz Dziekanowski
CM	8	Jan Urban
CF	20	Zbigniew Boniek (c)
CF	11	Włodzimierz Smolarek
Substitutions:
MF	9	Jan Karaś	(substituted on) 22'
MF	15	Andrzej Buncol	(substituted on) 46'
Manager:
(Poland) Antoni Piechniczek

=== Portugal vs Morocco ===
11 June 1986
16:00 CST

Portugal	1–3	Morocco
Diamantino 80'		Khairi 19', 27'; A. Merry 62'

Estadio Tres de Marzo, Zapopan
Attendance: 28,000
Referee: Alan Snoddy (Northern Ireland)

Portugal	Morocco

GK	22	Vítor Damas
RB	5	Álvaro		(substituted off) 55'
CB	8	Frederico
CB	15	António Oliveira
LB	20	Augusto Inácio
DM	7	Jaime Pacheco
CM	6	Carlos Manuel
CM	3	António Sousa		(substituted off) 69'
RW	14	Jaime Magalhães
LW	10	Paulo Futre
CF	9	Fernando Gomes (c)	(yellow card) 59'
Substitutions:
FW	19	Rui Águas		(substituted on) 55'
FW	17	Diamantino		(substituted on) 69'
Manager:
(Portugal) José Torres

GK	1	Badou Zaki (c)
RB	2	Labid Khalifa
CB	4	Mustafa El Biyaz
CB	5	Noureddine Bouyahyaoui
LB	3	Abdelmajid Lamriss
DM	6	Abdelmajid Dolmy
RM	7	Mustafa El Haddaoui	(substituted off) 71'
CM	10	Mohammed Timoumi
LM	17	Abderrazak Khairi
SS	8	Aziz Bouderbala
CF	9	Abdelkrim Merry
Substitutions:
MF	21	Abdelaziz Souleimani	(substituted on) 71'
Manager:
(Brazil) José Faria

== See also ==
- England at the FIFA World Cup
- Morocco at the FIFA World Cup
- Poland at the FIFA World Cup
- Portugal at the FIFA World Cup
