= Football at the 1983 Mediterranean Games – Men's team squads =

Below are the squads for the Football at the 1983 Mediterranean Games, hosted in Casablanca, Morocco, and took place between 9 and 17 September 1983.

== Group A ==
=== Greece Ol. ===
Coach: Stefanos Petritsis

No.	Pos.	Player	Date of birth (age)	Caps	Goals	Club
	GK	Antonis Manikas	9 February 1959 (aged 28)			(Hellenic Football Federation) Panionios
	GK	Andreas Tsakmakidis	9 March 1958 (aged 29)			(Hellenic Football Federation) Diagoras
	GK	Kotaras				(Hellenic Football Federation)
	DF	Polyvios Chatzopoulos	17 July 1961 (aged 26)			(Hellenic Football Federation) Panionios
	DF	Vasilis Papangelis	30 July 1959 (aged 28)			(Hellenic Football Federation) PAS Giannina
	DF	Dimitris Aivazidis	7 October 1961 (aged 25)			(Hellenic Football Federation) Panserraikos
	DF	Fotis Mantzoukis	18 May 1959 (aged 28)			(Hellenic Football Federation) PAS Giannina
	DF	Christos Koutropoulos	28 October 1963 (aged 23)			(Hellenic Football Federation) Panionios
	DF	Andreas Bonovas	13 November 1963 (aged 23)			(Hellenic Football Federation) Olympiacos
	MF	Konstantinos Mavridis	7 July 1962 (aged 25)			(Hellenic Football Federation) Panathinaikos
	MF	Daniil Papadopoulos	13 June 1963 (aged 24)			(Hellenic Football Federation) Iraklis
	MF	Anastasios Lefkopoulos	20 January 1961 (aged 26)			(Hellenic Football Federation) Iraklis
	MF	Vasilis Papachristou	8 January 1959 (aged 28)			(Hellenic Football Federation) Olympiacos
	MF	Athanasios Kanaras	20 July 1960 (aged 27)			(Hellenic Football Federation) Panionios
	MF	Zisis Tzikas	12 March 1963 (aged 24)			(Hellenic Football Federation) Panionios
	FW	Nikolaos Chatziantoniou	4 June 1961 (aged 26)			(Hellenic Football Federation) Apollon Kalamarias
	FW	Dimitris Saravakos	26 July 1961 (aged 26)			(Hellenic Football Federation) Panathinaikos

=== Morocco ===
Coach: (Brazil) José Faria

No.	Pos.	Player	Date of birth (age)	Caps	Goals	Club
	GK	Badou Zaki	2 April 1959 (aged 24)			(Royal Moroccan Football Federation) Wydad Casablanca
	DF	Abdelmajid Lamriss	12 February 1959 (aged 24)			(Royal Moroccan Football Federation) FAR Rabat
	DF	Mustafa El Biyaz	12 December 1960 (aged 22)			(Royal Moroccan Football Federation) Kawkab Marrakech
	DF	Ahmed Rmouki	1 January 1957 (aged 26)			(Royal Moroccan Football Federation) FAR Rabat
	DF	Noureddine Bouyahyaoui	7 January 1955 (aged 28)			(Royal Moroccan Football Federation) Kenitra AC
	DF	Lahcen Ouadani	14 July 1959 (aged 24)			(Royal Moroccan Football Federation) FAR Rabat
	DF	Labid Khalifa	1 January 1955 (aged 28)			(Royal Moroccan Football Federation) Kenitra AC
	MF	Abdelouahab Atik				(Royal Moroccan Football Federation) MAS Fez
	MF	Mustafa El Haddaoui	28 July 1961 (aged 22)			(Royal Moroccan Football Federation) Raja Casablanca
	MF	Aziz Bouderbala	26 December 1960 (aged 22)			(Royal Moroccan Football Federation) Wydad Casablanca
	MF	Mohamed Timoumi	15 January 1960 (aged 23)			(Royal Moroccan Football Federation) FAR Rabat
	FW	Khalid Labied	24 August 1955 (aged 28)			(Royal Moroccan Football Federation) FUS Rabat
	FW	Abdelhakim Barbouri				
	FW	Abdelhak Souadi				(Royal Moroccan Football Federation) Raja Casablanca

== Group B ==
=== Egypt ===
Coach: Saleh El Wahsh

No.	Pos.	Player	Date of birth (age)	Caps	Goals	Club
	GK	Adel El-Maamour	30 December 1954 (aged 28)			(Egyptian Football Association) Zamalek
	GK	Adel Abdel Moneim				(Egyptian Football Association) Al-Masry
	DF	Saeed El Gedy				(Egyptian Football Association) Zamalek
	DF	Hossam Kamal	1 July 1964 (aged 19)			
	DF	Ibrahim Youssef	1 January 1959 (aged 24)			(Egyptian Football Association) Zamalek
	DF	Mohamed Omar	3 September 1958 (aged 25)			(Egyptian Football Association) Al Ittihad Alexandria
	DF	Mohamed Sedki	25 August 1961 (aged 22)			(Egyptian Football Association) El Minya
	MF	Shawky Ghareeb	26 February 1959 (aged 24)			(Egyptian Football Association) Ghazl El-Mahalla
	MF	Mohamed Hazem	7 June 1960 (aged 23)			(Egyptian Football Association) Ismaily
	MF	Ibrahim El Weshahy				(Egyptian Football Association) Al-Masry
	MF	Mostafa El Zeftawi				(Egyptian Football Association) Ghazl El-Mahalla
	MF	Mohamed "Kefta" Abdelfattah				(Egyptian Football Association) Arab Contractors
	FW	Emad Suleiman	23 July 1959 (aged 24)			(Egyptian Football Association) Ismaily
	FW	Adel Abdelwahid				(Egyptian Football Association) Zamalek
	FW	Tarek Yehia	10 September 1961 (aged 21)			(Egyptian Football Association) Zamalek
	FW	Mahmoud El Mashaqui				(Egyptian Football Association) Ghazl El-Mahalla
		Mohamed Abdelhalim				
		Hossam Kamal Eddine				

=== Syria ===
Coach: Avedis Kavlakian

No.	Pos.	Player	Date of birth (age)	Caps	Goals	Club
	MF	George Khouri				(Syrian Football Association) Al-Jaish

== Group C ==
=== Algeria ===
Coach: Hamid Zouba

No.	Pos.	Player	Date of birth (age)	Caps	Goals	Club
	GK	Mohamed Lamine Baghloul	10 February 1955 (aged 28)			(Algerian Football Federation) WKF Collo
	GK	Nacerdine Drid	22 January 1957 (aged 26)			(Algerian Football Federation) ESM Bel Abbès
	DF	Mohamed Belkheïra	4 November 1957 (aged 25)			(Algerian Football Federation) ASC Oran
	DF	Mahmoud Guendouz	24 February 1953 (aged 30)			(Algerian Football Federation) MA Hussein Dey
	DF	Mustapha Kouici	16 April 1954 (aged 29)			(Algerian Football Federation) O Médéa
	DF	Nacereddine Laroussi				(Algerian Football Federation) MP Alger
	DF	Abdelhakim Serrar	24 April 1961 (aged 22)			(Algerian Football Federation) EP Sétif
10	MF	Lakhdar Belloumi	29 December 1958 (aged 24)			(Algerian Football Federation) GCR Mascara
	MF	Nasser Bouiche	8 June 1960 (aged 23)			(Algerian Football Federation) MP Alger
	MF	Abdelhamid Bouras	25 June 1959 (aged 24)			(Algerian Football Federation) ISM Aïn Beïda
	MF	Djamel Jefjef	30 January 1961 (aged 22)			(Algerian Football Federation) USM El Harrach
	MF	Abdelouahab Maïche	30 November 1959 (aged 23)			(Algerian Football Federation) MA Hussein Dey
	MF	Hocine Yahi	25 April 1960 (aged 23)			(Algerian Football Federation) CM Belcourt
	FW	Hamid Lefdjah	16 December 1960 (aged 22)			(Algerian Football Federation) ASC Oran
	FW	Abdelkrim Loucif	8 October 1959 (aged 23)			(Algerian Football Federation) CA Bordj Bou Arréridj
	FW	Djamel Menad	22 July 1960 (aged 23)			(Algerian Football Federation) JE Tizi Ouzou

=== Tunisia ===
Coach: (Poland) Ryszard Kulesza

No.	Pos.	Player	Date of birth (age)	Caps	Goals	Club
	GK	Slim Ben Othman	10 November 1959 (aged 23)			(Tunisian Football Federation) Club Africain
	DF	Abdelrazak Chahat	14 January 1962 (aged 21)			(Tunisian Football Federation) Club Africain
	DF	Hachemi Ouahchi	25 December 1960 (aged 22)			(Tunisian Football Federation) ES Sahel
	DF	Hamadi Cheriti	23 May 1958 (aged 25)			(Tunisian Football Federation) JS Kairouan
	DF	Moncef Chergui	7 August 1958 (aged 25)			
	DF	Saber El-Ghoul				(Tunisian Football Federation) Stade Tunisien
	MF	Mohamed Gasri	20 May 1960 (aged 23)			
	MF	Nabil Maâloul	25 December 1962 (aged 20)			(Tunisian Football Federation) ES Tunis
	MF	Tarak Dhiab	15 July 1954 (aged 29)			(Tunisian Football Federation) ES Tunis
	FW	Abdelhamid Hergal	27 January 1959 (aged 24)			(Tunisian Football Federation) Stade Tunisien
	FW	Abdelkader Rakbaoui	24 December 1962 (aged 20)			(Tunisian Football Federation) Stade Tunisien
	FW	Samir Ben Messaoud				(Tunisian Football Federation) AS Marsa

=== Turkey B ===
Coach: Erkan Kural

No.	Pos.	Player	Date of birth (age)	Caps	Goals	Club
	GK	Eser Kardeşler	26 February 1964 (aged 19)			(Turkish Football Federation) Bursaspor
	DF	Hakan Kutucuoğlu	25 September 1961 (aged 21)			(Turkish Football Federation) Altay
	DF	Murat Gültekin	5 December 1963 (aged 19)			(Turkish Football Federation) Bursaspor
	DF	Hasan Kemal Özdemir	9 February 1964 (aged 19)			(Turkish Football Federation) Fenerbahçe
	DF	Kayhan Çubuklu	11 November 1964 (aged 18)			(Turkish Football Federation) Kocaelispor
	DF	Erol Köseer	1 April 1959 (aged 24)			(Turkish Football Federation) Boluspor
	DF	Abdülkerim Durmaz	13 September 1960 (aged 22)			(Turkish Football Federation) Fatih Karagümrük
	MF	Rıza Çalımbay	2 February 1963 (aged 20)			(Turkish Football Federation) Beşiktaş
	MF	Sinan Engin	4 November 1964 (aged 18)			(Turkish Football Federation) Beşiktaş
	DF	Adil Tozlu	16 March 1964 (aged 19)			(Turkish Football Federation) Giresunspor
	FW	Erdi Demir	15 October 1964 (aged 18)			(Turkish Football Federation) Altay
	FW	Feyzullah Küçük	9 July 1962 (aged 21)			(Turkish Football Federation) Adanaspor
	FW	İsmail Akbaşlı	10 January 1963 (aged 20)			(Turkish Football Federation) Adanaspor
	FW	Ümit Gürsoy	4 October 1962 (aged 20)			(Turkish Football Federation) Samsunspor
	FW	Ahmet Koyuncuoğullarından	11 February 1964 (aged 19)			(Turkish Football Federation) MKE Ankaragücü
		Mehmet Ulu				
		Kemal Aksu				
		Murat Özarı				
