= Faustino (name) =

Faustino is a given name and a surname. Notable people with the name include:

== Given name ==
- Faustino Arévalo (1747–1824), Spanish Jesuit hymnographer and patrologist
- Faustino Aguilar (1882–1955), pioneering Filipino novelist, journalist, revolutionary, union leader, and editor
- Faustino Alonso (born 1961), Paraguayan football forward
- Faustino Amiano (1944–2020), Spanish rower
- Faustino Asprilla (born 1969), former Colombian football player, known as The Octopus
- Faustino Bocchi (1659–1742), Italian painter, who specialized in bizarre paintings of dwarfs
- Faustino Dettler (born 1998), Argentine footballer
- Faustino Galicia (died 1877), the most active scholar of the Nahuatl language of the 19th century
- Faustino Harrison (1900–1963), Uruguayan political figure
- Faustino Imbali (born 1956), Guinea-Bissau politician who was Prime Minister of Guinea-Bissau from 21 March 2001 to 9 December 2001
- Faustino Oramas (1911–2007), a Cuban singer, tres guitarist and composer
- Faustino Oro (born 2013), Argentine chess prodigy
- Félix Faustino Outes (1878–1939), Argentine anthropologist, archeologist and linguist
- Faustino Piaggio (1844–1924), Italian industrialist who also became a pioneer of the Latin American oil industry
- Faustino Raineri (died 1755), Italian painter, mainly a landscape painter of the Baroque period
- Faustino Rayo (died 1875), assassin of President of Ecuador Gabriel Garcia Moreno
- Faustino Reyes (born 1975), former boxer from Spain
- Faustino Rodríguez-San Pedro (1833–1925), Spanish politician
- Faustino Rojo (born 1990), Argentine footballer better known as Marcos
- Faustino Rupérez (born 1956), retired Spanish professional road racing cyclist
- Faustino Sainz Muñoz (1937–2012), Spanish prelate of the Roman Catholic Church
- Faustino Sánchez Valarolo (born 2004), Argentine rugby union player
- Domingo Faustino Sarmiento (1811–1888) Argentine statesman, intellectual, writer, activist and President of the Nation (1868–1874)

== Surname ==
- Alcides da Cruz Faustino (1940–1988), Brazilian football winger
- Auri Dias Faustino (born 1973), Brazilian football defender
- David Faustino (born 1974), American actor and rap artist primarily known for his role as Bud Bundy on the sitcom Married with Children
- Gumersindo Ramírez Faustino, Equatoguinean political activist
- Lenny Faustino (born 1979), Canadian pair skater
- Tats Faustino, Filipino musical composer, arranger, producer, musical director, songwriter, singer, and multi-instrumentalist
