= Agostino Bertelli =

Italian painter (1727–1776)

Agostino Bertelli (1727 - 1776) was an Italian painter, mainly painting landscapes.

Bertelli was born in Brescia, Republic of Venice in 1727. His father was a watch maker, but obtained a clerical education for his son. However, he became attached to music, as a violinist, and became an excellent landscape painter, training under Faustino Raineri. He was influenced by the works of Cavalier Tempesta, Berghem, and Piazeztta. He traveled to Genoa, where he befriended the painter of seascapes, Orazio Vernet.

After two years, he moved to Milan, where he was patronized by the Cardinal Giuseppe Pozzobonelli; who was a collector of the landscape artists Dietrich.

Upon returning to Brescia, his health was poor, and he had no reputation in that town. Among his pupils was the Count Aimo Maggi.
