= Gaudenzio Botti =

Italian painter

Gaudenzio Botti (1698 – 6 March 1775) was an Italian painter of the Baroque period, mainly active in his native Brescia then part of the Republic of Venice.

He trained initially in Brescia with Faustino Raineri, a local landscape painter. Botti said he painted in the style of the Dutch landscape painter Berghem. He painted both interior and exterior scenes; the interior scenes were often candle-lit.
