= Aimo Maggi =

Italian painter (1756–1793)

] Aimo Maggi (31 May 1756 – 9 December 1793) was an Italian painter of the Neoclassic period, mainly active in his natal city of Brescia.

Adept as a musician, he dedicated himself to writing and painting. He studied at the University of Bologna. He was a pupil of the landscape painter Agostino Bertelli. In 1794, and hence posthumously, Maggi's biography of Bertelli was published.
