= József Andrusch =

Hungarian footballer

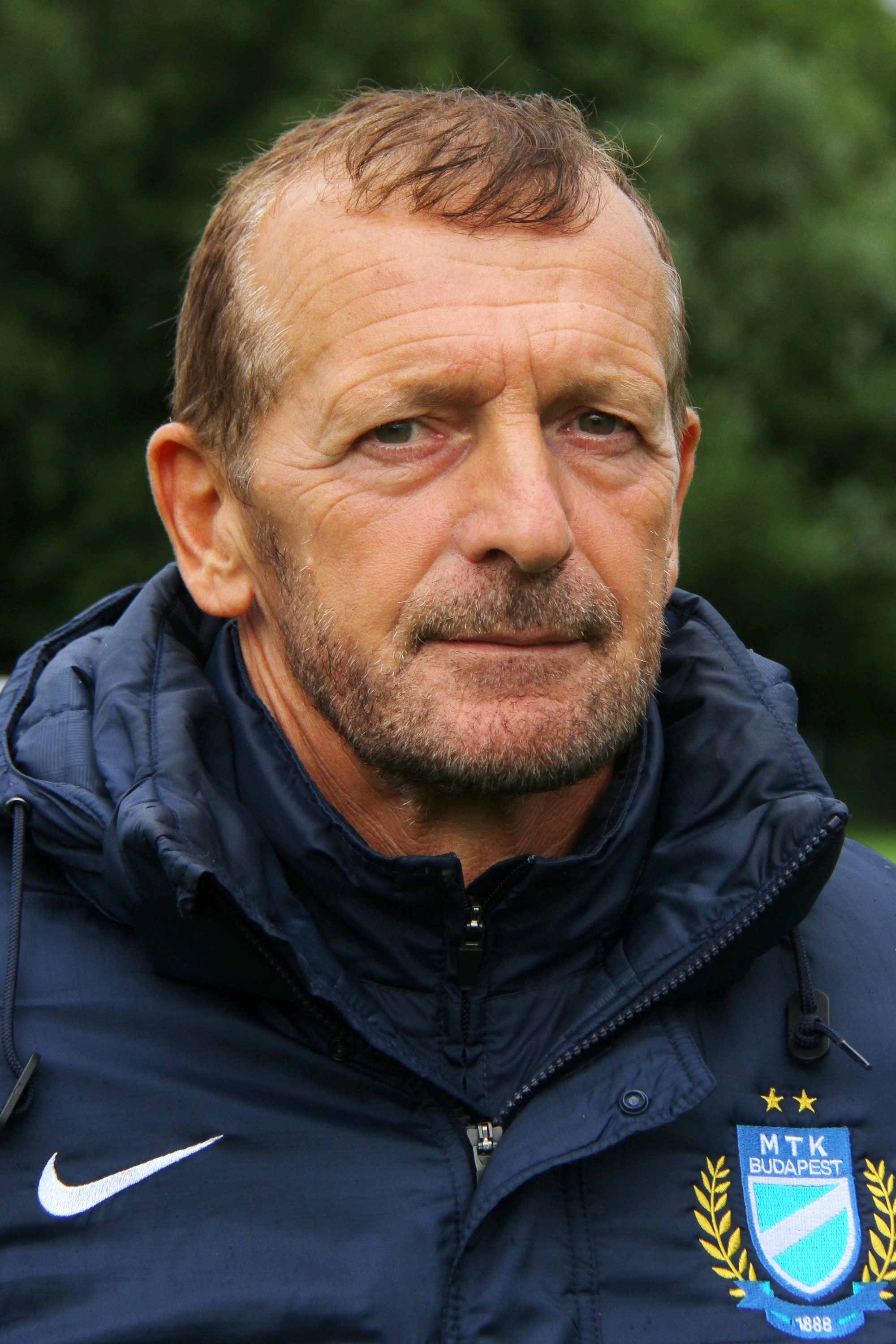

Personal information
- Full name: József Andrusch
- Date of birth: 31 March 1956 (age 70)
- Place of birth: Budapest, Hungary
- Height: 1.73 m (5 ft 8 in)
- Position: Goalkeeper

Senior career*
Years	Team	Apps	(Gls)
1982–1987	Budapest Honvéd FC		
1987–1990	Vasas SC		

International career
1984–1986	Hungary	5	(0)

Managerial career
- Hungary (Goalkeeper)
- * Club domestic league appearances and goals

József Andrusch (born 31 March 1956) is a retired Hungarian football player.

== Personal life ==
Andrusch is the oldest of four boys. Between the age of 5 and 6 his father replaced the door of the house and used the old door boards to make a kid size goal for Andrusch and his friends play in where Andrusch was the goalie. Andrusch played as a footballer both during his time in the university and the Hungarian army.

== International career ==
Andrusch played in 3 world cup qualifying matches for the 1986 FIFA World Cup.

== Post-retirement ==
In 2016 Andrusch became a goalkeeper trainer with his former team Vasas SC. He was previously the goalkeeper trainer for the Hungary national football team.

== Honours ==
Hungarian League: 1984, 1985, 1986
Hungarian Cup: 1985
