= Faustino Piaggio =

Faustino Piaggio (15 February 1844 – 9 February 1924) was an Italian industrialist who became a pioneer of the Latin American oil industry with his businesses based in Peru.

== Profile ==
Faustino G. Piaggio created the Peruvian oil industry almost 10 years before Standard Oil arrived in the area, and made it the oldest in Latin America. He also built the first oil refinery outside the United States. His oil holdings were controlled through Sociedad Anonima Comercial e Industrial Faustino G. Piaggio, that counted as its assets the Zorritos and Los Organos oil wells and a refinery, train installations for transport and several oil transport ships. His oil business existed from 1879 to 1934, the year it was nationalized by the Peruvian government and was the foundation of what is today the national Peruvian oil company Petroperú.

== History ==
Faustino Piaggio was born on 15 February 1844 in Genoa. He belonged to a well known Genoese family who had a shipbuilding and trading business. The Piaggio family had traded with Peru since the 18th century, though it is only in the mid 19th century that some family members decide to start new businesses in America. In 1862, the Piaggio family loses an important part of its fleet in an act of war with the Ottoman Empire, it is during this crisis that some family members decided to go to America to start new businesses. Exact register of this migration is difficult, but through scattered information in several documents, it is clear that Piaggio family members (all either brothers or cousins) left Genoa for Peru, Argentina, Brazil, Chile and the United States of America. Faustino G. Piaggio took a position as administrator of the trading house an uncle of his had in the Peruvian port of Callao. It would be in Peru where he would make his fortune and would achieve significant standing. He was recognized by the Peruvian government as a war hero during the War of the Pacific, between Chile and Peru, due to uncalled-for heroic action by a foreigner, and was also the first foreign Mayor of the Callao port during the 1896-1898 period, being responsible for mayor sanitation and water works, as well as bringing electricity to the South American port.

== Business interests ==
Piaggio formed one of the first large business groups in the South American region, with interests spanning everything from finance, commerce, services, mining, and oil. In 1907, based on a University of Pennsylvania letter, Faustino Piaggio owned the oil fields of Zorritos and Los Organos, an oil refinery, several ships, a major trading company working between Callao and Genoa, finance holdings, mines, land holdings, and had a fortune worth about 24 million dollars. He was a large shareholder and board member of the Banco de Peru y Londres, the largest South American bank of its day, major shareholder at Banco Italiano. Owned a large sodium nitrate mine called Compania Salitrera La Aguada de Pisagua (mineral fertilizer saltpeter), silver and zinc mines under Minera Nueva Italia, and owned 60% of the Compania Nacional de Cerveza, maker of Pilsen Callao (this brewery and the industrial/financial conglomerate attached to it was the last large business controlled by his heirs, it was sold to a competitor in 1994). He also had land development businesses through Cia. Immobiliaria la Legua, developing what is today the largest industrial park in Callao, Lima. His farm holdings spanned some 20,000 hectares that the Peruvian government nationalized in 1972, in a countrywide land redistribution scheme. Faustino G. Piaggio died on 9 February 1924, leaving six children, Clelia Piaggio de Lercari, Attilio Piaggio Basso, Pia Piaggio de Sissa, Umberto Piaggio Basso, Ada Piaggio de Lanata, and Ezio Piaggio Basso.
