= Eufemio Cabral =

Paraguayan footballer (born 1955)

Personal information
- Full name: Eufemio Raúl Cabral Aguilar
- Date of birth: 21 March 1958 (age 68)
- Place of birth: Asunción, Paraguay
- Height: 1.84 m (6 ft 0 in)
- Position: Winger

Senior career*
Years	Team	Apps	(Gls)
1976–1977	Burgos	20	(0)
1977–1979	Valencia	35	(0)
1979–1980	Racing Santander	27	(3)
1980–1981	Almería	31	(1)
1981–1984	Hércules	69	(6)
1984–1985	Lorca Deportiva	21	(2)
1985–1986	Guaraní	–	(–)
1986–1987	Rio Ave	2	(0)

International career
1985–1986	Paraguay	10	(0)
- * Club domestic league appearances and goals

Eufemio Raúl Cabral Aguilar (born 21 March 1955) is a Paraguayan football midfielder who played for Paraguay in the 1986 FIFA World Cup. He also played for Club Guaraní.
