= Marcel Zagoli Golié =

Ivory Coast footballer (1961–2024)

Marcel Zagouli Gbolié
Personal information
- Date of birth: 1961
- Date of death: 12 July 2024 (aged 63)
- Place of death: Abidjan, Ivory Coast

Senior career*
Years	Team	Apps	(Gls)
1980–1984	Bouaké FC		
1985–1988	Africa Sports National		

International career
1985–1988	Ivory Coast	11	
Medal record
Bronze medal – third place	1986 African Cup of Nations	Team competition
- * Club domestic league appearances and goals

Medal record

Men's soccer

Representing Ivory Coast

African Cup of Nations
Bronze medal – third place	1986 African Cup of Nations	Team competition

Marcel Zagouli Gbolié (1961 – 12 July 2024) was an Ivorian footballer who played as a goalkeeper. During his career, he played 11 matches for the Ivory Coast national team. During the 1986 African Cup of Nations, he blocked a penalty from Senegal's Jules Bocandé, and was integral in the third-place finish of the Ivory Coast during the tournament.

== Club career ==
During his professional football career, Gbolié played for clubs Bouaké FC and Africa Sports National. He made his first appearance for Bouaké FC in 1980, staying with the team until 1982. In 1983, he transferred to Africa Sports National in Abidjan, and remained with the team until 1992.

== International career ==
Gbolié made his debut for the Ivory Coast national team on 7 April 1985 in a 0–0 draw in a 1986 World Cup qualifier with Ghana, played in Abidjan. In 1986, he was called up to the squad for the 1986 African Cup of Nations. He played in five matches: group matches with Mozambique (3–0), with Egypt (0–2) and with Senegal (1–0), the semi-final with Cameroon (0–1) and the 3rd place match with Morocco (3–2). With the Ivory Coast, he finished third in that tournament.

In 1988, Gbolié was called up to the squad for the 1988 African Cup of Nations. At that tournament, he played in one group match, against Algeria (1–1). From 1985 to 1988, he appeared for the national team 12 times.

== After retirement ==
After Gbolié retired from football, he returned to live in his home village, Mimia, in the Haut-Sassandra Region of the Ivory Coast. In 2015 he received the Ivory Coast honor, Order of Ivory Merit, Knight for his services to football.

Gbolié died after a long illness in Abidijan's Treichville University Hospital, on 12 July 2024, at the age of 63.
