= Cheikh Seck =

Senegalese footballer

Cheikh Ahmed Seck (born 8 January 1958) is a Senegalese football goalkeeper who played for Senegal.
