= Salahdine Hmied =

Moroccan footballer (born 1961)

Personal information
- Date of birth: 1 September 1961 (age 65)
- Place of birth: Morocco
- Position: Goalkeeper

Senior career*
Years	Team	Apps	(Gls)
1983–1989	FAR Rabat		

International career
- Morocco
- * Club domestic league appearances and goals

Salahdine Hmied (born 1 September 1961) is a Moroccan football goalkeeper who played for Morocco in the 1986 FIFA World Cup. He also played for FAR Rabat.
