= Abdellah Bidane =

Moroccan footballer (born 1967)

Personal information
- Date of birth: 19 August 1967 (age 59)
- Place of birth: Morocco,Meknès
- Position: Defender

Senior career*
Years	Team	Apps	(Gls)
1986	CODM Meknès		
1986-1993	Olympique Khouribga		
1993-199?	CODM Meknès		

International career
1986 - 1989	Morocco	5	(0)
- * Club domestic league appearances and goals

Abdellah Bidane (born 19 August 1967), also known as Abdellah Bidar, is a former Moroccan football defender who played for Morocco in the 1986 FIFA World Cup. He also played for CODM Meknès.

== Honours ==
- Botola Pro: 1995
