= Jan Karaś =

Polish footballer (born 1959)

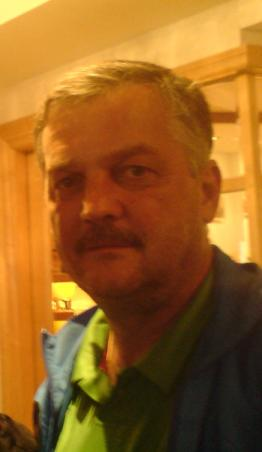
- Jan Karaś in 2012

Personal information
- Date of birth: 17 March 1959 (age 67)
- Place of birth: Kraków, Poland
- Height: 1.77 m (5 ft 9 1/2 in)
- Position: Second striker

Senior career*
Years	Team	Apps	(Gls)
1982	Hutnik Kraków		
1983–1989	Legia Warsaw	155	(20)
1989–1990	AEL	21	(3)
1991	VPS	8	(1)
1992–1993	Polonia Warsaw		
1994	Bug Wyszków		
1994–1996	Dolcan Ząbki		

International career
1984–1988	Poland	16	(1)

Managerial career
- 2002–2005: Dolcan Ząbki
- 2008–2009: Mazur Karczew
- 2009–2010: Hutnik Warsaw
- 2010: Marcovia Marki
- * Club domestic league appearances and goals

Jan Karaś (born 17 March 1959) is a Polish former professional footballer and manager. During his club career he played for Hutnik Kraków, Legia Warsaw, AEL, Kajaanin Palloilijat, Polonia Warsaw, and Dolcan Ząbki. He earned 16 caps for the Poland national football team and participated in the 1986 FIFA World Cup, where Poland reached the second round.

== Honours ==
Legia Warsaw

- Polish Cup: 1988–89
