= Faustino Raineri =

Italian painter

Faustino Raineri (died 1755) was an Italian painter, mainly a landscape painter of the Baroque period, mainly active in Brescia.

Raineri appears to have become a priest. He followed the style of vedute of Antonio Tempesta, painting outdoors. His close friend Gaudenzio Botti was also his pupil. The lack of varnish in his paintings has led most to decay.
