= Mustafa Merry =

Moroccan footballer (born 1958)

Personal information
- Full name: Mustapha Merry
- Date of birth: 21 April 1958 (age 68)
- Place of birth: Casablanca, Morocco
- Height: 1.80 m (5 ft 11 in)
- Position: Striker

Youth career
- Espérance Casablanca

Senior career*
Years	Team	Apps	(Gls)
- SC Hazebrouck
1983–1986	Valenciennes		
1986–1987	Nîmes		
1987–1988	Valenciennes		
1988–1990	Rouen		
1990–1991	Calais RUFC		
1991–1993	Dunkerque		
1993–1994	Olympique Grande-Synthe		

International career
- Morocco
- * Club domestic league appearances and goals

Mustafa Merry, also spelled Mustapha Merry (born 21 April 1958) is a Moroccan former professional footballer who played as a striker.

Born in Casablanca, Morocco, Merry spent his most of his professional career in France and was also part of the Moroccan squad at the 1986. He also competed for Morocco at the 1984 Summer Olympics.

== External links and references ==
Barreaud, Marc (1998). Dictionnaire des footballeurs étrangers du championnat professionnel français (1932-1997). L'Harmattan, Paris. ISBN 2-7384-6608-7.
