= Marek Ostrowski =

Polish footballer

Personal information
- Date of birth: 22 November 1959
- Place of birth: Skrwilno, Poland
- Date of death: 6 March 2017 (aged 57)
- Place of death: Stockerau, Austria
- Height: 1.73 m (5 ft 8 in)
- Position: Defender

Senior career*
Years	Team	Apps	(Gls)
1977–1978	Wisła Płock		
1978–1979	Stoczniowiec Gdańsk	28	(2)
1979–1982	Zawisza Bydgoszcz	52	(0)
1982–1989	Pogoń Szczecin	181	(24)
1989–1990	VfB Mödling		
1990–1995	SV Stockerau		
1996–1996	SC Klosterneuburg 1912		

International career
1981–1987	Poland	37	(1)
- * Club domestic league appearances and goals

Marek Ostrowski (22 November 1959 – 6 March 2017) was a Polish footballer who played as a defender. He represented Poland at the 1986 FIFA World Cup.

== Club career ==
He is one of the most notable players of Pogoń Szczecin during his time at the club, as he played 222 games, scoring 30 goals.

== International career ==
Ostrowski made his debut for Poland in a January 1981 friendly match against Japan and earned a total of 37 caps, scoring 1 goal. His final international was an October 1987 friendly match against Czechoslovakia.

=== International goals ===
Scores and results list Poland's goal tally first.

#	Date	Venue	Opponent	Score	Result	Competition	Ref
1	19 May 1985	Spyridon Louis, Marousi, Greece	Greece	2–1	4–1	1986 FIFA World Cup qualification	

== Personal life and death ==
He was hospitalized in January 2017 after a heart attack. He died in his sleep in March 2017, a few days after being discharged by the hospital.

== Honours ==
SV Stockerau

- Austrian Cup: 1990–91
