= Kazimierz Przybyś =

Polish footballer

Personal information
- Full name: Kazimierz Przybyś
- Date of birth: 11 July 1960 (age 66)
- Place of birth: Radom, Poland
- Height: 1.85 m (6 ft 1 in)
- Position: Defender

Youth career
- Broń Radom

Senior career*
| Years | Team | Apps | (Gls) |
| 1975–1983 | Broń Radom | | |
| 1983–1984 | Śląsk Wrocław | 38 | (0) |
| 1985–1990 | Widzew Łódź | 145 | (1) |
- Włókniarz Pabianice
- Broń Radom

International career
| 1985–1987 | Poland | 15 | (0) |
- * Club domestic league appearances and goals

Kazimierz Przybyś (born 11 July 1960) is a Polish former professional footballer who played as a defender. During his club career, he played for Broń Radom, Śląsk Wrocław, Widzew Łódź and Włókniarz Pabianice.

He earned 15 caps for the Poland national football team and participated in the 1986 FIFA World Cup, where Poland reached the second round.

== Honours ==
Widzew Łódź

- Polish Cup: 1984–85
