= Mouncif El Haddaoui =

Moroccan footballer (1964–2024)

Personal information
- Date of birth: 21 October 1964
- Place of birth: Morocco
- Date of death: 15 April 2024 (aged 59)
- Position: Midfielder

Senior career*
Years	Team	Apps	(Gls)
- AS Salé

International career
- Morocco
- * Club domestic league appearances and goals

Mouncif El Haddaoui (Arabic: منصف الحداوي; 21 October 1964 – 15 April 2024) was a Moroccan football midfielder who played for Morocco in the 1986 FIFA World Cup. He also played for AS Salé. He died on 15 April 2024, at the age of 59.
