= Faustino Alonso =

Paraguayan football forward (born 1961)

Personal information
- Date of birth: 15 February 1961 (age 65)
- Place of birth: Asunción, Paraguay
- Height: 1.76 m (5 ft 9 in)
- Position: Striker

Senior career*
Years	Team	Apps	(Gls)
1986	Sol de América		
1986–1987	Rio Ave	7	(1)

International career
1986	Paraguay	8	
- * Club domestic league appearances and goals

Faustino Alonso (born 15 February 1961) is a Paraguayan football forward who played for Paraguay in the 1986 FIFA World Cup. He also played for Club Sol de América.
