= Abdelaziz Souleimani =

Moroccan footballer

Personal information
- Date of birth: 30 April 1958 (age 68)
- Place of birth: Morocco
- Height: 1.79 m (5 ft 10 1/2 in)
- Position: Midfielder

Senior career*
Years	Team	Apps	(Gls)
1977-1994	MAS Fez		

International career
1985-1986	Morocco	14	(0)
- * Club domestic league appearances and goals

Abdelaziz Souleimani (born 30 April 1958) is a Moroccan football midfielder who played for Morocco in the 1986 FIFA World Cup. He also played for MAS Fez.
