= Abderrazak Khairi =

Moroccan footballer and coach

Personal information
- Date of birth: 20 November 1962 (age 63)
- Place of birth: Rabat, Morocco
- Height: 1.76 m (5 ft 9 in)
- Position: Midfielder

Senior career*
Years	Team	Apps	(Gls)
1982–1995	FAR Rabat		
1995–1996	Suwaiq Club		

International career
1985–1990	Morocco	31	(6)
- * Club domestic league appearances and goals

Abderrazak Khairi (born 20 November 1962) is a Moroccan former football player and coach who played as a midfielder.

== Career ==
Born in Rabat, Khairi played for the local club FAR Rabat. He scored goals in the 1985 and 1986 Coupe du Trône finals, helping the club win three successive cup finals.

He also played for the Morocco national team, scoring two goals for Morocco in the famous 1986 FIFA World Cup win against Portugal.

Khairi was appointed manager of MAS Fez in January 2006.
