= Aziz Bouderbala =

Moroccan footballer

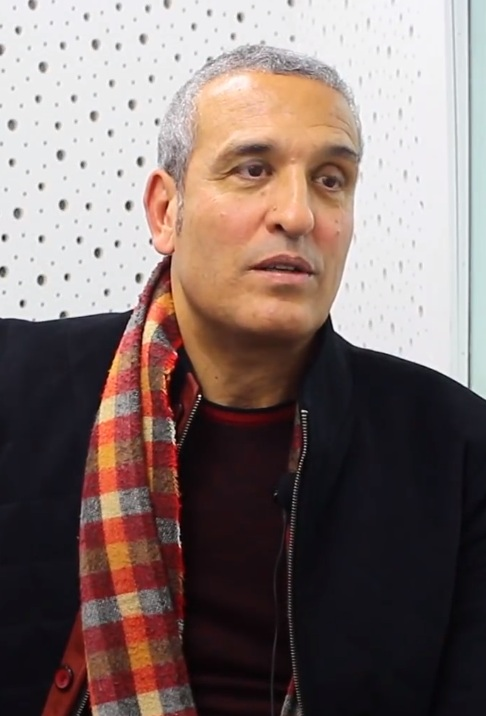
- Bouderbala in 2018

Personal information
- Full name: Abdelaziz El Idrissi Bouderbala
- Date of birth: December 26, 1960 (age 65)
- Place of birth: Morocco
- Height: 1.78 m (5 ft 10 in)
- Position: Midfielder

Senior career*
Years	Team	Apps	(Gls)
1977–1984	Wydad Casablanca	215	(58)
1984–1988	Sion	88	(35)
1988–1990	Racing Club Paris	49	(15)
1990–1992	Lyon	54	(19)
1992–1993	Estoril	24	(8)
1993–1995	St. Gallen	34	(12)
Total		249	(127)

International career
1979–1992	Morocco	57	(14)
Medal record
Representing Morocco
Africa Cup of Nations
Third place	1980 Nigeria
- * Club domestic league appearances and goals

Abdelaziz El Idrissi Bouderbala (Arabic: عبد العزيز الإدريسي بودربالة; born December 26, 1960) is a Moroccan former professional footballer who played as a midfielder. In 2006, he was selected by CAF as one of the best 200 African football players of the last 50 years.

== Career ==
Bouderbala started his professional career at Wydad Casablanca, before moving to FC Sion, Matra Racing and French Olympique Lyon. He also played for Estoril-Praia from Portugal. In 1986, Bouderbala was runner-up for the African Footballer of the Year award.

He made 57 appearances for the Morocco national team and played at the 1986 FIFA World Cup finals.

Bouderbala later worked as a technical director at his first club Wydad Casablanca.

In 2015, he became an ambassador of The SATUC Cup, a new charitable global football competition for U16 orphans, refugees and disadvantaged children.

== Career statistics ==
Scores and results list Morocco's goal tally first, score column indicates score after each Morocco goal.

List of international goals scored by Aziz Bouderbala
No.	Date	Venue	Opponent	Score	Result	Competition
1	8 June 1980	Tunis, Tunisia	Tunisia	1–0	1-0	Friendlies
2	22 March 1981	Fès, Morocco	Liberia	2-1	3-1	1982 African Cup of Nations qualification
3	22 March 1981	Fès, Morocco	Liberia	3-1	3-1	1982 African Cup of Nations qualification
4	4 April 1981	Monrovia, Liberia	Liberia	2–0	5-0	1982 African Cup of Nations qualification
5	27 September 1981	Kénitra, Morocco	Tunisia	1–2	2-2	Friendlies
6	3 October 1982	Riyadh, Saudi Arabia	Senegal	1–2	1-2	Friendlies
7	10 April 1983	Casablanca, Morocco	Mali	2-0	4-0	African Cup Qualification
8	10 April 1983	Casablanca, Morocco	Mali	3-0	4-0	African Cup Qualification
9	15 January 1984	Abidjan, Ivory Coast	Ivory Coast	1–0	3-3	Friendlies
10	28 July 1985	Casablanca, Morocco	Egypt	1–0	2-0	1986 FIFA World Cup qualification (CAF)
11	6 October 1985	Rabat, Morocco	Libya	3–0	3-0	1986 FIFA World Cup qualification (CAF)
12	22 January 1989	Tunis, Tunisia	Tunisia	1–0	1-2	1990 FIFA World Cup qualification (CAF)
13	2 September 1990	Casablanca, Morocco	Mauritania	2–0	4-0	African Cup Qualification
14	12 April 1991	Nouakchott, Mauritania	Mauritania	1–0	2-0	African Cup Qualification

== Honours ==
Wydad

- Botola Pro: 1978
- Moroccan Throne Cup: 1978, 1979, 1981, 1997
- Mohammed V Cup: 1979

FC Sion

- Swiss Cup: 1986

Morocco

- Mediterranean Games: 1983
- Africa Cup of Nations third place: 1980

individual

- African Footballer of the Year runner-up: 1986
- African Footballer of the 20th century: 15th place
- African Cup Of Nations Player of the Tournament: 1988
- IFFHS All-time Morocco Men's Dream Team
