= Abdelmajid Lamriss =

Moroccan footballer (born 1959)

Personal information
- Date of birth: 12 February 1959 (age 67)
- Place of birth: Marrakesh, Morocco
- Height: 1.70 m (5 ft 7 in)
- Position: Defender

Senior career*
Years	Team	Apps	(Gls)
1975–1980	Mouloudia de Marrakech		
1981–1990	FAR Rabat		

International career
1982–1989	Morocco	48	(0)
- * Club domestic league appearances and goals

Abdelmajid Lamriss (born 12 February 1959) is a Moroccan football defender who played for Morocco in the 1986 FIFA World Cup. He also played for FAR Rabat.
