= Mustapha El Biyaz =

Moroccan footballer (born 1960)

Mustapha El-Biyaz
Personal information
- Full name: Mustapha El-Biaz
- Date of birth: 12 December 1960 (age 65)
- Place of birth: Taza, Morocco
- Height: 1.73 m (5 ft 8 in)
- Position: Defender

Senior career*
Years	Team	Apps	(Gls)
- KAC Marrakech
1987–1988	Penafiel	1	(0)

International career
1980–1988	Morocco	46	(3)
- * Club domestic league appearances and goals

Mustapha El-Biyaz (also spelled El-Biaz; born 12 December 1960) is a retired Moroccan football defender.

== Career ==
El Biyaz played club football for KAC Marrakech in the Botola. He also had a brief "spell" with F.C. Penafiel in the Portuguese Liga during the 1987–88 season. El Biyaz played for the Morocco national football team at the 1984 Summer Olympics and in the 1986 FIFA World Cup finals. In 2006, he was selected by CAF as one of the best 200 African football players of the last 50 years.
