= Ezzaki Badou =

Moroccan footballer (born 1959)

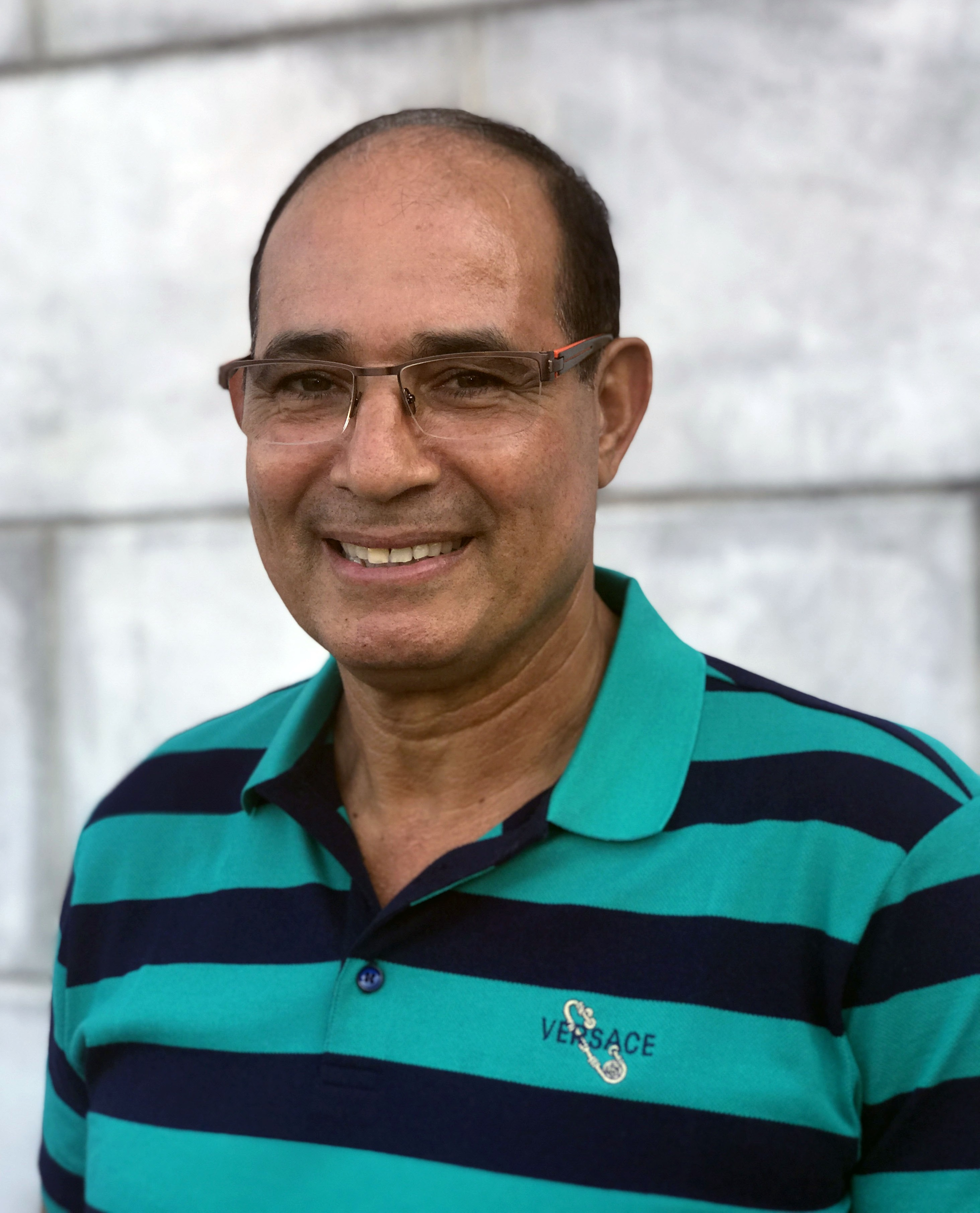
- Badou at the Moroccan Cultural Day Festival in Union City, New Jersey in 2021

Personal information
- Date of birth: 2 April 1959 (age 67)
- Place of birth: Sidi Kacem, Morocco
- Height: 1.88 m (6 ft 2 in)
- Position: Goalkeeper

Team information
- Current team: Jordan (manager)

Senior career*
Years	Team	Apps	(Gls)
1976–1978	AS Salé		
1978–1986	Wydad Casablanca	344	(1)
1986–1992	Mallorca	190	(0)
1992–1993	FUS Rabat		
Total		534	(1)

International career
1979–1992	Morocco	78	(0)

Managerial career
- 1993–1994: FUS Rabat
- 1995–1996: Wydad AC
- 1996: AS Salé
- 1996–1998: SCC Mohammédia
- 1998–2000: Wydad AC
- 2000–2001: Kawkab Marrakech
- 2001–2002: Maghreb Fez
- 2002–2005: Morocco
- 2006–2007: Kawkab Marrakech
- 2008–2010: Wydad AC
- 2010–2011: Kawkab Marrakech
- 2012–2013: Wydad AC
- 2013–2014: Olympic Safi
- 2014–2016: Morocco
- 2016–2017: CR Belouizdad
- 2017: IR Tanger
- 2018: MC Oran
- 2019: Difaâ El Jadida
- 2022: IR Tanger
- 2022–2023: CS Chebba
- 2023: Sudan
- 2023–2026: Niger
- 2026–: Jordan
Medal record
Men's football
Representing Morocco (as manager)
Africa Cup of Nations
Runner-up	2004
Representing Morocco (as player)
Africa Cup of Nations
Third place	1980 Nigeria
- * Club domestic league appearances and goals

Ezzaki "Zaki" Badou (Arabic: الزاكي بادو; born 2 April 1959) is a Moroccan football coach and former goalkeeper who is the current head coach of the Jordan national team.

== Playing career ==
Born in Sidi Kacem, Zaki represented AS Salé, Wydad AC, RCD Mallorca and Fath Union Sport during a 17-year professional career. With Mallorca, for which he signed in 1986 after being named by France Football as African Footballer of the Year, he won promotion to La Liga in 1989 while winning the Ricardo Zamora Trophy.

Zaki played for the Morocco national team in the 1986 FIFA World Cup and four Africa Cup of Nations. In the former tournament, held in Mexico, he helped his country to become the first African team to reach the round-of-16; additionally, the recipient of 76 full caps competed in the 1984 Summer Olympics.

In 2006, Zaki was selected by the Confederation of African Football as one of the best 200 African footballers of the last 50 years.

== Coaching career ==
Zaki retired in 1993 at the age of 34, immediately becoming a manager. In 2002, after coaching a host of clubs, including former sides FUS and WAC, he was appointed at the helm of Morocco, leaving his post after three years and returning in May 2014. He managed to create a young group and qualify the national team for the African Cup then organized in Tunisia in 2004 without a defeat. Zaki's protégés reached the final by losing to Tunisia 2–1. He left by mutual consent in February 2016.

Zaki subsequently returned to club duties, going on to be in charge of several sides.

On 9 July 2017, Zaki was named as the coach of IR Tanger.

On 12 March 2023, he was named as coach of Sudan, with his salary being paid by the Saudi Arabian FA as part of a co-operation agreement. In managing his first game for Sudan, he managed to claim a 1–0 victory against Gabon in the 2023 Africa Cup of Nations qualification.

On 8 December 2023, The Niger Football Federation announced, that it has officially signed a contract with coach Badou Zaki to lead the Niger national football team for two years.

On the July 19 2026, the JFA (Jordanian Football Association) announced that Zaki would be assigned as head coach for Jordanian first team following the resignation of his country man Jamal Sellami

== Managerial statistics ==
As of match played 17 November 2026

Managerial record by team and tenure
Team	Nat.	From	To	Record					Ref.
Team	Nat.	From	To	G	W	D	L	Win %	Ref.
Jordan	(Jordan)	27 September 2026	present	3	1	2	0	33.33	
Career Total				3	1	2	0	33.33	

== Honours ==
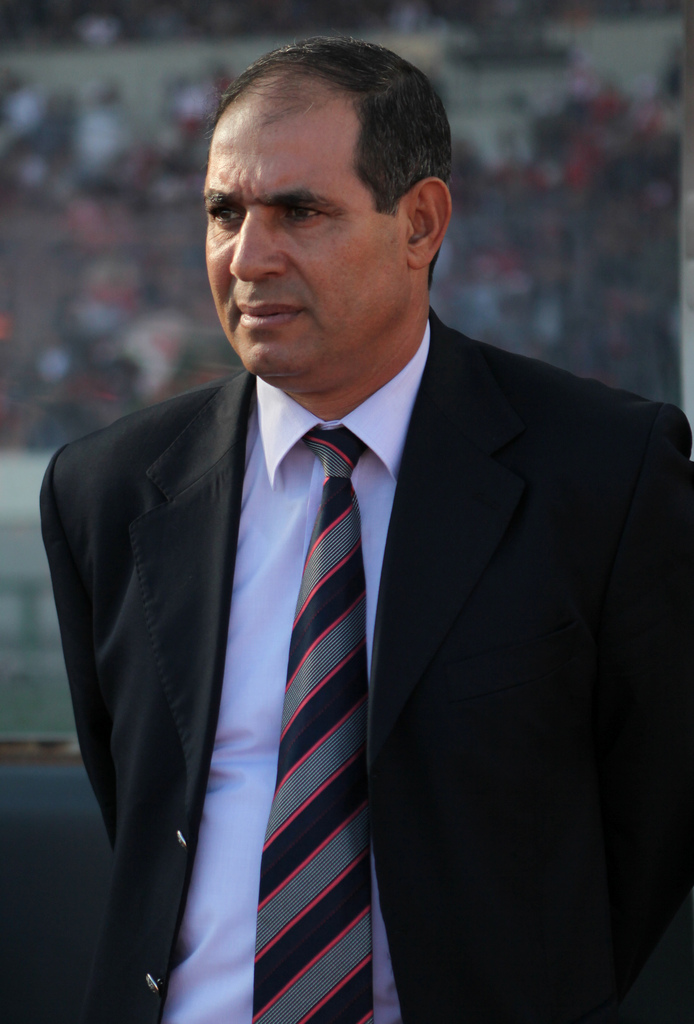
Zaki in 2009

=== Player ===
Wydad Casablanca

- Botola Pro: 1977–78, 1985–86
- Moroccan Throne Cup: 1978, 1979, 1981
- Mohammed V Cup: 1979

RCD Mallorca

- Copa del Rey runner-up: 1990–91

Morocco

- Africa Cup of Nations third place: 1980

=== Manager ===
Wydad Casablanca

- Botola Pro: 2010
- Moroccan Throne Cup: 1998
- CAF Cup runner-up: 1999
- Arab Club Champions Cup runner-up: 2009
- CAF Champions League runner-up: 2011

CR Belouizdad

- Algerian Cup: 2017

Morocco

- Africa Cup of Nations runner-up: 2004

=== Individual ===
- Moroccan Footballer of the Year: 1979, 1981, 1986, 1988
- Moroccan Goalkeeper of the Year: 1978, 1979, 1986
- African Footballer of the Year: 1986
- Arab Footballer of the Year: 1986
- Algerian Coach of the Year: 2017
- Ricardo Zamora Trophy: 1988–89
- La Liga Goalkeeper of the Year: 1988, 1989, 1990
- IFFHS All-time Morocco Men's Dream Team

Orders

- Order of the Throne: 2004
