= José Faria =

Brazilian footballer and manager

Personal information
- Full name: José Faria
- Date of birth: April 26, 1933
- Place of birth: Rio de Janeiro, Brazil
- Date of death: October 8, 2013 (aged 80)
- Place of death: Rabat, Morocco
- Position: Right winger

Senior career*
Years	Team	Apps	(Gls)
- Bonsucesso
- Fluminense
1960	Bangu		

Managerial career
- 1968–1979: Fluminense (Youth teams)
- 1979: Qatar U-19
- 1979–1982: Al-Sadd
- 1982-1983: FAR Rabat
- 1983–1988: Morocco
- 1995–1997: Olympique de Khouribga
- * Club domestic league appearances and goals

José 'Mehdi' Faria (April 26, 1933 – October 8, 2013) was a Brazilian football coach. He coached Morocco in the 1986 FIFA World Cup, when they became the first African team to advance to the second round.

He converted to Islam when coaching Morocco.

== Managerial career ==
Faria started his managerial career in Fluminense's junior teams, where he worked for more than 10 years. He was responsible for the rise of many Brazilian stars, such as World Cup captain Edinho. He received many offers while working in Brazil. However, he rejected them all due to the risk involved. He eventually changed his mind, and accepted an offer to coach the Qatar under-20 team as a replacement for Evaristo de Macedo who temporarily took charge of Iraq in Mexico. He claimed to have made as much money in Qatar in two years as he had made in last 23 years.

He coached the Morocco national team from 1983 till 1988. He rejected an offer from Inter Milan while coaching the team, and converted to Islam, adopting the middle name of "Mehdi".
