= Labid Khalifa =

Moroccan footballer

Personal information
- Date of birth: 1 January 1955 (age 71)
- Place of birth: Morocco
- Height: 1.68 m (5 ft 6 in)
- Position: Defender

Senior career*
Years	Team	Apps	(Gls)
- KAC Kenitra

International career
- Morocco
- * Club domestic league appearances and goals

Labid Khalifa (born 1955) is a Moroccan football defender who played for Morocco in the 1986 FIFA World Cup. He also played for KAC Kenitra.
