= Lahcen Ouadani =

Moroccan footballer (born 1959)

Personal information
- Date of birth: 14 July 1959 (age 67)
- Place of birth: Marrakesh, Morocco
- Height: 1.84 m (6 ft 0 in)
- Position: Defender

Senior career*
Years	Team	Apps	(Gls)
1977-1988	FAR Rabat		
1988-1990	Union Touarga Sport		
1990-1991	FUS Rabat		
1991-1992	Raja Beni Mellal		

International career
1980-1989	Morocco	42	(1)
- * Club domestic league appearances and goals

Lahcen Ouadani (born 14 July 1959 in Marrakesh) is a Moroccan football defender who played for Morocco in the 1986 FIFA World Cup. He also played for FAR Rabat.
