= Noureddine Bouyahyaoui =

Moroccan football defender

Noureddine Bouyahiaoui
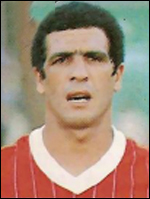

Personal information
- Date of birth: 7 January 1955 (age 71)
- Place of birth: Kenitra, Morocco
- Position: Defender

Senior career*
Years	Team	Apps	(Gls)
- KAC Kenitra

International career
1979-1986	Morocco	48	(0)
- * Club domestic league appearances and goals

Noureddine Bouyahiaoui (Arabic: نور الدين البويحياوي; born 7 January 1955) is a Moroccan football defender who played for Morocco in the 1986 FIFA World Cup . He also played for KAC Kenitra.
