= Football at the 1984 Summer Olympics – Men's team squads =

The association football tournament at the 1984 Summer Olympics started on July 29 and ended on August 11. It was the first Olympic football competition in which professionals were officially allowed. Until then, the amateur-only rule had heavily favored socialist countries from the Soviet Bloc whose players were professionals in all but name. However, as agreed with FIFA to preserve the primacy of the World Cup, the Olympic competition was restricted to players with no more than five "A" caps at tournament start, regardless of age.

== Group A ==
=== Chile ===
Head coach: Pedro Morales Torres

No.	Pos.	Player	DoB	Age	Caps	Club	Tournament games	Tournament goals	Minutes played	Sub off	Sub on	Cards yellow/red
1	GK	Eduardo Fournier	Jan 2, 1956	28	?	(Chile) Cobreloa	4	0	390	0	0	0
2	DF	Daniel Ahumada	Feb 2, 1960	24	?	(Chile) Unión La Calera	4	0	390	0	0	0
3	DF	Luis Mosquera	Oct 3, 1959	24	?	Universidad de Chile	4	0	390	0	0	0
4	DF	Alex Martínez	Oct 26, 1959	24	?	(Chile) Universidad Católica	4	0	390	0	0	(yellow card) 1
5	DF	Leonel Contreras	Aug 30, 1961	22	?	(Chile) Everton	4	0	390	0	0	(yellow card) 1
6	DF	Alejandro Hisis	Feb 16, 1962	22	?	(Chile) Colo-Colo	4	0	365	1	0	(yellow card) 1
7	MF	Alfredo Núñez	Feb 16, 1960	24	?	(Chile) Palestino	2	0	141	0	1	0
8	FW	Jaime Vera	Mar 25, 1963	21	?	(Chile) Colo-Colo	2	0	112	1	1	0
9	FW	Fernando Santís	Jan 10, 1958	26	?	(Chile) Deportes Magallanes	4	1	300	0	2	0
10	MF	Sergio Marchant	Sep 17, 1961	22	?	(Chile) Arturo Fernández Vial	4	0	231	1	2	0
11	MF	Juvenal Olmos	Oct 5, 1962	21	?	(Chile) Universidad Católica	4	0	315	1	0	0
12	GK	Patricio Toledo	Jul 14, 1962	21	?	(Chile) Universidad Católica	0	0	0	0	0	0
13	FW	Luis Pérez	Apr 17, 1965	19	?	(Chile) Deportes Magallanes	0	0	0	0	0	0
14	MF	Sergio Pacheco	Jul 30, 1959	24	?	(Chile) Deportes Naval	0	0	0	0	0	0
15	FW	Carlos Ramos	Apr 29, 1958	26	?	Universidad de Chile	4	0	278	1	1	(yellow card) 1
16	FW	Jaime Baeza	Feb 28, 1962	22	?	(Chile) Everton	4	1	369	1	0	(yellow card) 1
17	MF	Marco Antonio Figueroa	Feb 21, 1962	22	?	(Chile) Unión La Calera	4	0	229	2	1	0

=== France ===
Head coach: Henri Michel

No.	Pos.	Player	DoB	Age	Caps	Club	Tournament games	Tournament goals	Minutes played	Sub off	Sub on	Cards yellow/red
1	GK	Albert Rust	Oct 10, 1953	30	?	(France) FC Sochaux-Montbéliard	5	0	480	0	0	0
2	DF	William Ayache	Jan 10, 1961	23	?	(France) FC Nantes	5	0	480	0	0	(yellow card) 1
3	DF	Michel Bibard	Nov 30, 1958	25	?	(France) FC Nantes	3	0	225	0	1	0
4	MF	Dominique Bijotat	Jan 3, 1961	23	?	(France) AS Monaco	5	1	467	1	0	(yellow card) 1
5	FW	François Brisson	Apr 9, 1958	26	?	(France) RC Lens	4	3	379	1	0	0
6	FW	Patrick Cubaynes	May 6, 1960	24	?	(France) Nîmes Olympique	4	0	360	0	0	0
7	FW	Patrice Garande	Nov 27, 1960	23	?	(France) AJ Auxerre	3	1	116	0	2	0
8	DF	Philippe Jeannol	Aug 6, 1958	25	?	(France) AS Nancy	4	1	360	0	0	0
9	MF	Guy Lacombe	Jun 12, 1955	29	?	(France) Toulouse FC	5	1	480	0	0	0
10	MF	Jean-Claude Lemoult	Aug 6, 1960	23	?	(France) Paris SG	4	1	390	0	0	0
11	MF	Jean-Philippe Rohr	Dec 23, 1961	22	?	(France) FC Metz	4	0	288	0	2	(yellow card) 1
12	DF	Didier Sénac	Oct 2, 1958	25	?	(France) RC Lens	4	0	315	1	0	(yellow card) 1
13	DF	Jean-Christophe Thouvenel	Oct 1, 1958	25	?	(France) FC Girondins de Bordeaux	4	0	345	1	0	0
14	MF	José Touré	Apr 24, 1961	23	?	(France) FC Nantes	3	0	205	1	0	0
15	FW	Daniel Xuereb	Jun 22, 1959	25	?	(France) RC Lens	5	5	462	2	0	0
16	MF	Jean-Louis Zanon	Dec 23, 1961	22	?	(France) AS Saint-Étienne	3	0	255	0	1	0
17	GK	Michel Bensoussan	Jan 5, 1954	30	?	(France) FC Rouen	0	0	0	0	0	0

=== Norway ===
Due to the boycott of the Olympics, Norway took part in place of East Germany.
Head coach: Tor Røste Fossen

No.	Pos.	Player	DoB	Age	Caps	Club	Tournament games	Tournament goals	Minutes played	Sub off	Sub on	Cards yellow/red
1	GK	Erik Thorstvedt	Oct 28, 1962	21	?	(Norway) Viking	3	0	270	0	0	0
2	DF	Svein Fjælberg	Jan 12, 1959	25	?	(Norway) Viking	3	0	225	1	0	0
3	DF	Terje Kojedal	Aug 16, 1957	26	?	(Norway) Ham-Kam	3	0	270	0	0	0
4	DF	Knut Torbjørn Eggen	Nov 1, 1960	23	?	(Norway) Rosenborg	3	0	270	0	0	(yellow card) 1
5	DF	Trond Sirevåg	Oct 17, 1955	28	?	(Norway) Bryne	0	0	0	0	0	0
6	MF	Per Egil Ahlsen	Mar 4, 1958	26	?	(Norway) Fredrikstad	3	1	270	0	0	(yellow card) 1
7	DF	Per Edmund Mordt	Mar 25, 1965	19	?	(Norway) Vålerenga	2	0	180	0	0	0
8	MF	Kai Erik Herlovsen	Sep 25, 1959	24	?	(West Germany) Borussia Mönchengladbach	3	0	270	0	0	0
9	MF	Stein Gran	Oct 20, 1958	25	?	(Norway) Vålerenga	2	0	135	0	1	0
10	MF	Tom Sundby	Dec 15, 1960	23	?	(Norway) Lillestrøm	3	0	270	0	0	0
11	FW	Stein Kollshaugen	Feb 16, 1956	28	?	(Norway) Moss	1	0	67	1	0	0
12	GK	Ola By Rise	Nov 14, 1960	23	?	(Norway) Rosenborg	0	0	0	0	0	0
13	FW	Joar Vaadal	Aug 2, 1960	23	?	(Norway) Lillestrøm	2	2	101	0	1	(yellow card) 1
14	MF	Egil Johansen	Apr 30, 1962	22	?	(Norway) Vålerenga	3	0	203	0	1	(yellow card) 1
15	MF	Jan Berg	May 14, 1965	19	?	(Norway) Molde	1	0	7	0	1	0
16	FW	André Krogsæter	May 12, 1961	23	?	(Norway) Lillestrøm	3	0	226	0	1	0
17	FW	Arve Seland	Dec 12, 1963	20	?	(Norway) Start	3	0	206	1	1	0

=== Qatar ===
Head coach: (Brazil) Evaristo de Macedo

No.	Pos.	Player	DoB	Age	Caps	Club	Tournament games	Tournament goals	Minutes played	Sub off	Sub on	Cards yellow/red
1	GK	Younes Ahmed	August 17, 1963	26	?	(Qatar) Al-Rayyan	3	0	270	0	0	0
2	DF	Mohammed Al-Sowaidi	Jun 25, 1962	22	?	(Qatar) Al-Arabi	3	0	270	0	0	0
3	DF	Sultan Waleed Jamaan	May 15, 1962	22	?	(Qatar) Umm-Salal	1	0	90	0	0	0
4	DF	Yousef Al-Adsani	Oct 12, 1965	18	?	(Qatar) Al-Sadd	0	0	0	0	0	0
5	DF	Mubarak Anber	Jan 1, 1954	30	?	(Qatar) Al-Sadd	3	0	270	0	0	0
6	FW	Faraj Al-Mass	1961	23	?	(Qatar) Al-Ahli	3	0	270	0	0	0
7	MF	Mubarak Suwaid	Dec 12, 1967	16	?		0	0	0	0	0	0
8	DF	Mohamed Al-Ammari	Dec 10, 1965	18	?	(Qatar) Al-Sadd	1	0	90	0	0	(yellow card) 1
9	GK	Ahmad Al-Majid	Jul 18, 1962	22	?	Qatar SC	0	0	0	0	0	0
10	MF	Mubarak Al-Khater	Jan 8, 1966	18	?	(Qatar) Al-Wakrah	3	0	220	0	0	(yellow card) (red card) 1
11	MF	Saleh Al-Mehaizaa	Oct 8, 1965	18	?		2	0	16	0	2	0
12	FW	Ali Zaid	Jan 20, 1961	22	?	(Qatar) Al-Arabi	3	0	242	2	0	0
13	DF	Adel Ahmed Malalla	Sep 15, 1961	22	?	(Qatar) Al-Ahli	3	0	270	0	0	(yellow card) 1
14	FW	Ibrahim Khalfan	Nov 25, 1961	22	?	(Qatar) Al-Arabi	3	0	207	0	1	(yellow card) 1
15	FW	Mansour Muftah	Nov 22, 1955	29	?	(Qatar) Al-Rayyan	3	0	270	0	0	0
16	MF	Khalid Salman	Apr 5, 1962	22	?	(Qatar) Al-Sadd	2	2	180	0	0	0
17	MF	Issa Al-Mohammadi	Dec 19, 1963	20	?	(Qatar) Al-Ahli	3	0	220	1	0	(red card) 1

== Group B ==
=== Cameroon ===
Head coach: (Socialist Federal Republic of Yugoslavia) Radivoje Ognjanović

No.	Pos.	Player	DoB	Age	Caps	Club	Tournament games	Tournament goals	Minutes played	Sub off	Sub on	Cards yellow/red
1	GK	Joseph-Antoine Bell	Oct 8, 1954	29	?	(Egypt) Al-Mokawloon al-Arab	3	0	270	0	0	0
2	DF	Luc Mbassi			?	(Cameroon) Tonnerre Yaoundé	2	0	180	0	0	0
3	MF	Isaac Sinkot	Jul 11, 1954		?	(Cameroon) Dynamo Douala	1	0	90	0	0	0
4	DF	Michel Bilamo			?	(Cameroon) Tonnerre Yaoundé	2	0	180	0	0	0
5	MF	Elie Onana	Oct 13, 1951	32	?	(Cameroon) Canon Yaoundé	0	0	0	0	0	0
6	DF	Emmanuel Kundé	Jul 15, 1956	28	?	(Cameroon) Canon Yaoundé	2	0	180	0	0	0
7	MF	Louis-Paul Mfédé	Feb 26, 1961	23	?	(France) Rennes	3	1	178	1	1	0
8	FW	Eugène Ekéké	May 30, 1960	24	?	(France) Racing Paris	2	0	133	0	1	0
9	FW	Roger Milla	May 20, 1952	32	?	(France) Bastia	3	1	270	0	0	(yellow card) 1
10	MF	Dagobert Dang	Feb 6, 1958	26	?	(Cameroon) Canon Yaoundé	2	0	137	1	0	0
11	MF	Charles Toubé	Jan 22, 1958	26	?	(Cameroon) Tonnerre Yaoundé	3	0	270	0	0	(yellow card) 1
12	FW	Ernest Ebongué	May 15, 1962	22	?	(Cameroon) Tonnerre Yaoundé	2	0	135	0	1	0
13	MF	Paul Bahoken	Jul 7, 1955	29	?	(France) Olympique Alès	2	1	137	1	0	(yellow card) 2
14	MF	Théophile Abega	Jul 9, 1955	29	?	(Cameroon) Canon Yaoundé	3	0	253	0	0	(yellow card) (red card) 1
15	DF	François Doumbé Lea	Jan 30, 1954	30	?	(Cameroon) Union Douala	3	0	270	0	0	0
16	DF	Ibrahim Aoudou	Aug 23, 1955	28	?	(France) Cannes	3	0	270	0	0	0
17	GK	Jacques Songo'o	Mar 17, 1964	20	?	(Cameroon) Canon Yaoundé	0	0	0	0	0	0

=== Canada ===
Head coach: (England) Tony Waiters

No.	Pos.	Player	DoB	Age	Caps	Club	Tournament games	Tournament goals	Minutes played	Sub off	Sub on	Cards yellow/red
1	GK	Tino Lettieri	Sep 27, 1957	25	?	(United States) Minnesota Kicks	4	0	390	0	0	0
2	DF	Bob Lenarduzzi	May 1, 1955	29	?	(Canada) Vancouver Whitecaps	4	0	390	0	0	(yellow card) 1
3	DF	Bruce Wilson	Jun 20, 1951	33	?	(Canada) Toronto Blizzard	4	0	390	0	0	(yellow card) 1
4	DF	Terry Moore	Jun 2, 1958	26	?	(United States) Tulsa Roughnecks	4	0	390	0	0	(yellow card) 1
5	DF	Ian Bridge	Sep 18, 1959	24	?	(Canada) Vancouver Whitecaps	4	0	390	0	0	0
6	MF	Randy Ragan	Jun 7, 1959	25	?	(Canada) Toronto Blizzard	4	0	390	0	0	(yellow card) 1
7	MF	David Norman	May 6, 1962	22	?	(Canada) Vancouver Whitecaps	2	0	43	0	2	0
8	MF	Gerry Gray	Jun 20, 1961	23	?	(United States) New York Cosmos	4	1	390	0	0	0
9	FW	Ken Garraway	Dec 12, 1956	27	?	(Canada) Victoria Athletics	2	0	19	0	2	(yellow card) 1
10	FW	Dale Mitchell	Apr 21, 1958	26	?	(United States) Tacoma Stars	4	3	390	0	0	0
11	MF	Mike Sweeney	Dec 25, 1959	24	?	(United States) Golden Bay Earthquakes	4	0	390	0	0	0
12	FW	Igor Vrablic	Jul 19, 1965	19	?	(United States) Golden Bay Earthquakes	4	1	342	3	0	0
14	MF	Pasquale De Luca	May 26, 1962	22	?	(Canada) Toronto Blizzard	0	0	0	0	0	0
15	MF	Paul James	Nov 11, 1963	20	?	(Canada) Toronto Blizzard	4	0	347	2	0	0
16	FW	John Catliff	Jan 8, 1955	29	?	(United States) Harvard University	1	0	29	0	1	0
17	DF	Craig Martin	Jul 15, 1957	25	?	(Canada) McMaster University	0	0	0	0	0	0
22	GK	Sven Habermann	Nov 3, 1961	22	?	(Canada) Toronto Blizzard	0	0	0	0	0	0

=== Iraq ===
Head coach: (Iraq) Ammo Baba

No.	Pos.	Player	Date of birth (age)	Club
1	GK	Raad Hammoudi (c)	1 May 1953 (aged 31)	(Iraq Football Association) Al-Shorta
2	DF	Adnan Dirjal	26 January 1960 (aged 24)	(Iraq Football Association) Al-Rasheed
3	DF	Khalil Allawi	6 September 1958 (aged 25)	(Iraq Football Association) Al-Rasheed
4	DF	Karim Jafar		(Iraq Football Association) Al-Jaish
5	DF	Kadhim Mutashar	1 January 1960 (aged 24)	(Iraq Football Association) Al-Rasheed
6	MF	Ali Hussein Shihab	5 May 1961 (aged 23)	(Iraq Football Association) Al-Talaba
7	FW	Rahim Hameed	23 May 1963 (aged 21)	(Iraq Football Association) Al-Jaish
8	FW	Karim Saddam	26 May 1960 (aged 24)	(Iraq Football Association) Al-Jaish
10	FW	Hussein Saeed	21 January 1958 (aged 26)	(Iraq Football Association) Al-Talaba
11	FW	Emad Jassim	17 August 1960 (aged 23)	(Iraq Football Association) Al-Tayaran
12	MF	Sadiq Mousa	20 October 1959 (aged 24)	(Iraq Football Association) Al-Jaish
13	MF	Karim Allawi	1 April 1960 (aged 24)	(Iraq Football Association) Al-Amana
14	DF	Hussam Nima	1 July 1955 (aged 29)	(Iraq Football Association) Al-Jaish
15	MF	Natiq Hashim	15 January 1960 (aged 24)	(Iraq Football Association) Al-Tayaran
16	DF	Mohammed Fadel	27 October 1963 (aged 20)	(Iraq Football Association) Al-Shorta
17	FW	Wamidh Munir	8 August 1961 (aged 22)	(Iraq Football Association) Al-Talaba
20	GK	Fatah Nsaief	2 February 1951 (aged 33)	(Iraq Football Association) Al-Jaish

=== Yugoslavia ===
The following is the Yugoslavia squad in the men's football tournament of the 1984 Summer Olympics.

Coach: Ivan Toplak

No.	Pos.	Player	Date of birth (age)	Caps	Goals	1984 club
1	GK	Ivan Pudar	16 August 1961 (aged 22)	2	0	(Football Association of Yugoslavia) Hajduk Split
2	DF	Vlado Čapljić	22 March 1962 (aged 22)	3	0	(Football Association of Yugoslavia) Željezničar
3	DF	Mirsad Baljić	4 March 1962 (aged 22)	6	1	(Football Association of Yugoslavia) Željezničar
4	MF	Srečko Katanec	16 July 1963 (aged 21)	5	0	(Football Association of Yugoslavia) Olimpija
5	DF	Marko Elsner	11 April 1960 (aged 24)	5	0	(Football Association of Yugoslavia) Red Star
6	DF	Ljubomir Radanović	21 July 1960 (aged 24)	6	1	(Football Association of Yugoslavia) Partizan
7	MF	Admir Smajić	7 September 1963 (aged 20)	3	0	(Football Association of Yugoslavia) Partizan
8	MF	Nenad Gračan	23 January 1962 (aged 22)	6	1	(Football Association of Yugoslavia) Rijeka
9	FW	Milko Đurovski	26 February 1963 (aged 21)	2	0	(Football Association of Yugoslavia) Red Star
10	MF	Mehmed Baždarević	28 September 1960 (aged 23)	6	0	(Football Association of Yugoslavia) Željezničar
11	FW	Borislav Cvetković	30 September 1962 (aged 21)	3	5	(Football Association of Yugoslavia) Dinamo Zagreb
12	GK	Tomislav Ivković	11 August 1960 (aged 23)	4	0	(Football Association of Yugoslavia) Red Star
13	MF	Jovica Nikolić	11 February 1959 (aged 25)	5	3	(Football Association of Yugoslavia) Red Star
14	FW	Stjepan Deverić	20 August 1961 (aged 22)	5	5	(Football Association of Yugoslavia) Dinamo Zagreb
15	DF	Branko Miljuš	17 August 1960 (aged 23)	5	0	(Football Association of Yugoslavia) Hajduk Split
16	MF	Dragan Stojković	3 March 1965 (aged 19)	5	0	(Football Association of Yugoslavia) Radnički Niš
17	MF	Mitar Mrkela	10 July 1965 (aged 19)	4	0	(Football Association of Yugoslavia) Red Star

== Group C ==
=== Brazil ===
Head coach: (Brazil) Jair Picerni

No.	Pos.	Player	DoB	Age	Caps	Club	Tournament games	Tournament goals	Minutes played	Sub off	Sub on	Cards yellow/red
1	GK	Gilmar Rinaldi	Jan 13, 1959	25	?	(Brazil) Internacional	6	0	600	0	0	0
2	DF	Ronaldo	Jul 10, 1962	22	?	(Brazil) Corinthians	6	1	600	0	0	(yellow card) 1
3	DF	Pinga	Apr 23, 1965	19	?	(Brazil) Internacional	5	0	458	1	0	0
4	DF	Mauro Galvão	Dec 19, 1961	22	?	(Brazil) Internacional	6	0	600	0	0	0
5	MF	Ademir	Jan 6, 1960	24	?	(Brazil) Internacional	6	0	600	0	0	0
6	DF	André Luís	Oct 21, 1959	25	?	(Brazil) Internacional	5	0	510	0	0	(yellow card) 2
7	MF	Paulo Santos	Apr 14, 1960	24	?	(Brazil) Internacional	1	0	64	0	1	0
8	MF	Dunga	Oct 31, 1963	21	?	(Brazil) Internacional	6	2	600	0	0	0
9	FW	Kita	Jan 6, 1958	26	?	(Brazil) Internacional	4	1	218	2	2	0
10	FW	Gilmar Popoca	Feb 18, 1964	20	?	(Brazil) Flamengo	6	4	600	0	0	0
11	FW	Silvinho	Nov 13, 1958	25	?	(Brazil) Internacional	5	1	510	0	0	(yellow card) 1
12	GK	Luís Henrique	May 18, 1960	24	?	(Brazil) Ponte Preta	0	0	0	0	0	0
13	MF	Luiz Carlos Winck	Jan 5, 1963	21	?	(Brazil) Internacional	1	0	90	0	0	(yellow card) 1
14	DF	Davi	Nov 19, 1963	20	?	(Brazil) Santos	2	0	142	0	1	0
15	MF	Tonho	Aug 18, 1957	26	?	(Brazil) Aimoré	6	0	439	3	1	0
16	FW	Chicão	Sep 4, 1962	21	?	(Brazil) Ponte Preta	6	0	382	2	2	0
17	FW	Milton Cruz	Aug 1, 1957	26	?	(Brazil) Internacional	3	0	43	0	3	0

=== Morocco ===
Head coach: (Brazil) José Faria

No.	Pos.	Player	DoB	Age	Caps	Club	Tournament games	Tournament goals	Minutes played	Sub off	Sub on	Cards yellow/red
1	GK	Badou Zaki	Apr 2, 1959	25	?	(Morocco) Wydad Casablanca	3	0	270	0	0	0
2	DF	Saad Dahan	Feb 18, 1956	28	?	(Morocco) FAR Rabat	3	0	270	0	0	(yellow card) 1
3	DF	Abdelmajid Lamriss	Feb 12, 1959	25	?	(Morocco) FAR Rabat	3	0	270	0	0	0
4	DF	Mustapha El Biyaz	Dec 12, 1960	23	?	(Morocco) KAC Marrakech	2	0	179	0	0	(yellow card) (red card) 1
5	DF	Noureddine Bouyahiaoui	Jan 7, 1955	28	?	(Morocco) KAC Kenitra	3	0	270	0	0	0
6	MF	Abdelmajid Dolmy	Apr 19, 1953	31	?	(Morocco) Raja Casablanca	3	0	270	0	0	(yellow card) 1
7	MF	Mustafa El Haddaoui	Jul 28, 1961	23	?	(Morocco) Raja Casablanca	2	0	79	1	1	0
8	MF	Driss Mouttaqui	Sep 1, 1956	27	?	(Morocco) MAS Fez	2	0	160	1	0	0
9	FW	Hassan Hanini	Oct 21, 1955	28	?	(Morocco) RS Settat	2	0	117	2	0	0
10	MF	Mohamed Timoumi	Jan 15, 1960	24	?	(Morocco) Union de Touarga	3	0	270	0	0	0
11	MF	Khalid El-Bied	Aug 24, 1955	28	?	(Morocco) FUS Rabat	3	0	153	0	2	0
12	GK	Salahdine Hmied	Sep 1, 1961	22	?	(Morocco) FAR Rabat	0	0	0	0	0	0
13	FW	Mustapha Merry	Apr 20, 1958	26	?	(France) US Valenciennes	3	1	270	0	0	0
14	DF	Mohamed Safri	Apr 18, 1958	28	?	(Switzerland) CS Chênois	0	0	0	0	0	0
15	DF	Lahcen Ouadani	Jul 14, 1959	25	?	(Morocco) FAR Rabat	2	0	170	1	0	(yellow card) 1
16	FW	Hamid Janina	Aug 29, 1958	25	?	(Morocco) RS Kenitra	1	0	10	0	1	0
17	FW	Abdeslam Laghrissi	Jan 5, 1962	22	?	(Morocco) FAR Rabat	3	0	211	0	1	0

=== Saudi Arabia ===
Head coach: Khalil Al-Zayani

No.	Pos.	Player	DoB	Age	Caps	Club	Tournament games	Tournament goals	Minutes played	Sub off	Sub on	Cards yellow/red
1	GK	Mohammed Al-Husain	Apr 10, 1960	24	?	(Saudi Arabia) Al-Shabab	3	0	270	0	0	0
2	DF	Sami Jasem Al-Dosari	Mar 11, 1965	19	?	(Saudi Arabia) Al-Ettifaq	3	0	250	1	0	0
3	DF	Hussein Al-Bishi	Nov 13, 1966	17	?	(Saudi Arabia) Al-Hilal	3	0	270	0	0	(yellow card) 1
4	DF	Sameer Abdulshaker	May 12, 1960	24	?	(Saudi Arabia) Ohud	3	0	262	0	0	(yellow card) 2 (red card) 1
5	DF	Abdullah Faraj Masoud	Oct 20, 1960	23	?	(Saudi Arabia) Al-Hilal	2	0	121	0	1	0
6	DF	Ahmad Al-Bishi	Sep 2, 1962	21	?	(Saudi Arabia) Al-Qadisiyah	3	0	270	0	0	0
7	MF	Shaye Al-Nafeesah	Mar 20, 1962	22	?	(Saudi Arabia) Al-Kawkab	2	0	71	1	1	0
8	MF	Ahmed Bayazid	Feb 4, 1959	25	?	(Saudi Arabia) Al-Ittihad	1	0	90	0	0	0
9	FW	Majed Abdullah	Nov 1, 1959	24	?	(Saudi Arabia) Al-Nassr	3	1	270	0	0	0
10	MF	Fahad Al-Mosaibeth	Apr 4, 1961	23	?	(Saudi Arabia) Al-Hilal	3	0	270	0	0	0
11	FW	Mohaisen Al-Jam'an	Apr 6, 1966	18	?	(Saudi Arabia) Al-Nassr	3	0	248	1	0	0
12	MF	Salman Al-Dosari	Nov 10, 1963	20	?	(Saudi Arabia) Al-Ettifaq	1	0	58	0	1	0
13	FW	Mohamed Abed Abdul Jawad	Jun 11, 1962	21	?	(Saudi Arabia) Al-Ahli	3	0	212	1	0	0
14	FW	Saleh Khalifa Al-Dosari	May 2, 1954	30	?	(Saudi Arabia) Al-Ettifaq	3	0	198	1	1	0
15	DF	Nawaf Al-Khamis	Jun 14, 1961	23	?	(Saudi Arabia) Al-Shabab	0	0	0	0	0	0
16	FW	Omar Bakhashwain	Aug 7, 1962	21	?	(Saudi Arabia) Al-Ettifaq	2	0	110	0	1	0
21	GK	Abdullah Al-Deayea	Dec 1, 1961	22	?	(Saudi Arabia) Al-Ta'ee	0	0	0	0	0	0

=== West Germany ===
Due to the boycott of the Olympics, West Germany took part in place of the Soviet Union.
Head coach: Erich Ribbeck

No.	Pos.	Player	DoB	Age	Caps	Club	Tournament games	Tournament goals	Minutes played	Sub off	Sub on	Cards yellow/red
1	GK	Bernd Franke	Feb 12, 1948	36	?	(West Germany) Eintracht Braunschweig	4	0	360	0	0	0
2	DF	Manfred Bockenfeld	Jul 23, 1960	24	?	(West Germany) Fortuna Düsseldorf	4	1	354	1	0	0
3	DF	Roland Dickgießer	Nov 9, 1960	23	?	(West Germany) SV Waldhof Mannheim	1	0	6	0	1	0
4	DF	Dieter Bast	Aug 28, 1951	32	?	(West Germany) Bayer 04 Leverkusen	4	0	360	0	0	0
5	DF	Bernd Wehmeyer	Jun 6, 1952	32	?	(West Germany) Hamburger SV	4	0	360	0	0	0
6	DF	Guido Buchwald	Jan 24, 1961	23	?	(West Germany) VfB Stuttgart	4	0	360	0	0	0
7	DF	Jürgen Groh	Jul 17, 1956	28	?	(West Germany) Hamburger SV	4	0	315	1	0	0
8	MF	Rudi Bommer	Aug 19, 1957	26	?	(West Germany) Fortuna Düsseldorf	4	3	360	0	0	(yellow card) 1
9	FW	Dieter Schatzschneider	Apr 26, 1958	26	?	(West Germany) Hamburger SV	3	0	137	2	1	0
10	DF	Andreas Brehme	Nov 9, 1960	23	?	(West Germany) 1. FC Kaiserslautern	4	1	360	0	0	0
11	FW	Frank Mill	Jul 23, 1958	26	?	(West Germany) Borussia Mönchengladbach	4	1	354	1	0	(yellow card) 1
12	GK	Walter Junghans	Oct 26, 1958	25	?	(West Germany) Schalke 04	0	0	0	0	0	0
13	MF	Alfred Schön	Jan 13, 1962	22	?	(West Germany) SV Waldhof Mannheim	1	0	45	0	1	0
14	MF	Peter Lux	Oct 4, 1962	21	?	(West Germany) Eintracht Braunschweig	2	0	31	0	2	0
15	MF	Uwe Rahn	May 21, 1962	22	?	(West Germany) Borussia Mönchengladbach	4	2	335	1	0	0
16	FW	Christian Schreier	Feb 4, 1959	25	?	(West Germany) VfL Bochum	4	2	223	1	2	0
17	DF	Dieter Schlindwein	Feb 7, 1961	23	?	(West Germany) Waldhof Mannheim	0	0	0	0	0	0

== Group D ==
=== Costa Rica ===
Head coach: (Spain) Antonio Moyano

No.	Pos.	Player	DoB	Age	Caps	Club	Tournament games	Tournament goals	Minutes played	Sub off	Sub on	Cards yellow/red
1	GK	Marco Antonio Rojas	Nov 8, 1952	31	?	(Costa Rica) Deportivo Saprissa	2	0	180	0	0	(yellow card) 1
4	DF	César Hines	Jul 13, 1958	25	?	(Costa Rica) Sagrada Família	2	0	180	0	0	0
5	FW	Marvin Obando	Apr 4, 1960	24	?	(Costa Rica) San Carlos	3	0	270	0	0	0
6	MF	Germán Chavarría	Mar 19, 1958	26	?	(Costa Rica) Herediano	3	0	270	0	0	0
7	MF	Juan Cayasso	Jun 24, 1961	23	?	(Costa Rica) Alajuelense	1	0	45	0	1	0
8	MF	Carlos Santana	Jun 12, 1953	35	?	(Costa Rica) Deportivo Saprissa	3	0	162	1	1	0
9	FW	Leónidas Flores	Jan 24, 1965	23	?	(Costa Rica) Puntarenas	2	0	68	0	2	0
10	MF	Enrique Rivers	Jan 4, 1961	23	?	(Costa Rica) Deportivo Saprissa	3	1	225	0	1	0
11	FW	Evaristo Coronado	Sep 13, 1960	23	?	(Costa Rica) Deportivo Saprissa	3	1	161	1	1	0
12	DF	Minor Alpízar	Sep 27, 1959	24	?	(Costa Rica) Herediano	2	0	180	0	0	(yellow card) 1
13	DF	Carlos Toppings	Apr 7, 1953	31	?	(Costa Rica) San Carlos	3	0	243	1	0	(yellow card) 1
14	FW	Guillermo Guardia	Feb 27, 1960	24	?	(Costa Rica) Deportivo Saprissa	3	0	247	1	0	0
15	DF	Enrique Díaz	Feb 23, 1959	25	?	(Costa Rica) Deportivo Saprissa	2	0	135	1	0	0
16	MF	Álvaro Solano	Jun 25, 1961	23	?	(Costa Rica) Alajuelense	2	0	154	1	0	0
17	DF	Miguel Simpson	Sep 25, 1955	30	?	(Costa Rica) San Carlos	3	0	270	0	0	0
18	MF	Luis Galagarza	Aug 15, 1963	20	?	(Costa Rica) Puntarenas	1	0	90	0	0	0
22	GK	Alejandro González Rojas	Mar 3, 1955	29	?	(Costa Rica) Alajuelense	1	0	90	0	0	0

=== Egypt ===
Head coach: Mawser Fat'hi

No.	Pos.	Player	DoB	Age	Caps	Club	Tournament games	Tournament goals	Minutes played	Sub off	Sub on	Cards yellow/red
1	GK	Adel El-Maamour	1955	29	?	(Egypt) El Zamalek	3	0	270	0	0	(yellow card) 2
2	MF	Khalid Gadallah	1958	26	?	(Egypt) El Ahly	1	1	90	0	0	0
3	DF	Rabei Yassin	1960	24	?	(Egypt) El Ahly	3	0	270	0	0	0
4	MF	Mohamed Helmy	May 4, 1962	22	?	(Egypt) El Zamalek	2	0	126	0	1	(yellow card) 1
5	DF	Ibrahim Youssef	1959	25	?	(Egypt) El Zamalek	4	0	360	0	0	0
6	DF	Hamada Sedki	Aug 25, 1961	24	?	(Egypt) El Minya SC	1	0	71	0	0	(yellow card) (red card) 1
7	FW	Moustafa Abdou (c)	Jun 10, 1953	31	?	(Egypt) El Ahly	3	0	75	1	2	(yellow card) (red card) 1
8	MF	Shawky Gharib	1959	25	?	(Egypt) Mahala	4	0	353	1	0	(yellow card) 1
9	MF	Magdi Abdel Ghani	Jul 27, 1959	25	?	(Egypt) El Ahly	4	1	360	0	0	0
10	FW	Mahmoud El Khatib	Oct 30, 1954	23	?	(Egypt) El Ahly	4	1	257	1	1	0
11	FW	Emad Soliman	July 23, 1959	23	?	(Egypt) Ismaily	4	2	327	3	0	0
12	MF	Taher Abouzeid	Apr 1, 1962	22	?	(Egypt) El Ahly	4	0	360	0	0	0
13	DF	Badr Hamed	1959	25	?	(Egypt) El Zamalek	4	0	360	0	0	0
14	FW	Mahmoud Hassan	1962	22	?	(Egypt) Ismaily	3	0	117	0	2	0
15	DF	Mohamed Omar	1959	25	?	(Egypt) Al-Ittihad Alexandria	3	0	270	0	0	0
16	FW	Alaa Nabil	1961	23	?	(Egypt) Al-Mokawloon	2	0	170	0	0	(yellow card) (red card) 1
17	GK	Ahmed Nagui Salem	1953	31	?	(Egypt) Tersana	1	0	90	0	0	0

=== Italy ===
Due to the boycott of the Olympics, Italy took part in place of Czechoslovakia.
Head coach: Enzo Bearzot

No.	Pos.	Player	DoB	Age	Caps	Club	Tournament games	Tournament goals	Minutes played	Sub off	Sub on	Cards yellow/red
1	GK	Franco Tancredi	Jan 10, 1955	29	?	(Italy) AS Roma
2	DF	Riccardo Ferri	Aug 20, 1963	20	?	(Italy) F.C. Internazionale Milano
3	DF	Filippo Galli	May 19, 1963	21	?	(Italy) A.C. Milan
4	DF	Sebastiano Nela	Mar 13, 1961	23	?	(Italy) AS Roma
5	DF	Roberto Tricella	Mar 18, 1959	25	?	(Italy) Hellas Verona
6	DF	Pietro Vierchowod	Apr 6, 1959	25	?	(Italy) Sampdoria
7	MF	Salvatore Bagni	Sep 25, 1956	27	?	(Italy) F.C. Internazionale Milano
8	DF	Franco Baresi	May 8, 1960	24	?	(Italy) A.C. Milan
9	MF	Sergio Battistini	May 7, 1963	21	?	(Italy) A.C. Milan
10	MF	Antonio Sabato	Jan 9, 1958	26	?	(Italy) F.C. Internazionale Milano
11	MF	Beniamo Vignola	Jun 12, 1959	24	?	(Italy) Juventus FC
12	GK	Walter Zenga	Apr 28, 1960	24	?	(Italy) F.C. Internazionale Milano
13	MF	Pietro Fanna	Jun 23, 1958	26	?	(Italy) Hellas Verona F.C.
14	FW	Daniele Massaro	May 23, 1961	23	?	(Italy) ACF Fiorentina
15	FW	Massimo Briaschi	May 12, 1958	26	?	(Italy) Genoa C.F.C.
16	FW	Maurizio Iorio	Jun 6, 1959	25	?	(Italy) Hellas Verona F.C.
17	FW	Aldo Serena	Jun 25, 1960	24	?	(Italy) F.C. Internazionale Milano

=== United States ===
Head coach: (Greece) Alketas Panagoulias

No.	Pos.	Player	DoB	Age	Caps	Club	Tournament games	Tournament goals	Minutes played	Sub off	Sub on	Cards yellow/red
1	GK	David Brcic	Jun 21, 1957	27	?	(United States) New York Cosmos	3	0	270	0	0	0
2	DF	Bruce Savage	Dec 21, 1960	23	?	(United States) Baltimore Blast	3	0	270	0	0	0
3	FW	Gregg Thompson	May 29, 1961	23	?	(United States) Tampa Bay Rowdies	3	1	270	0	0	0
4	DF	Jeff Durgan	Aug 29, 1961	22	?	(United States) New York Cosmos	1	0	36	1	0	0
5	MF	Kazbek Tambi	Dec 8, 1961	22	?	(United States) New York Cosmos	0	0	0	0	0	0
6	MF	Angelo DiBernardo	May 16, 1956	26	?	(United States) New York Cosmos	3	0	256	1	0	0
7	DF	Erhardt Kapp	Jun 16, 1959	25	?	(United States) Pittsburgh Spirit	3	0	270	0	0	(yellow card) 1
8	MF	Hernan "Chico" Borja	Aug 24, 1959	24	?	(United States) New York Cosmos	3	0	218	2	0	(yellow card) 1
9	FW	Steve Moyers	Sep 23, 1956	27	?	(United States) New York Cosmos	3	0	270	0	0	0
10	MF	Rick Davis	Nov 24, 1958	25	?	(United States) St. Louis Steamers	3	2	270	0	0	0
11	MF	Hugo Perez	Nov 8, 1963	20	?	(United States) San Diego Sockers	3	0	199	1	1	0
12	DF	Kevin Crow	Sep 17, 1961	22	?	(United States) San Diego Sockers	3	0	270	0	0	0
13	FW	Jean Willrich	Apr 27, 1953	31	?	(United States) San Diego Sockers	2	1	157	1	0	0
14	MF	Mike Fox	Sep 24, 1961	22	?	(United States) Las Vegas Americans	3	0	148	0	2	0
15	GK	Jamie Swanner	Jan 13, 1961	23	?	(United States) Clemson University	0	0	0	0	0	0
16	FW	Jeff Hooker	Mar 21, 1965	19	?	(United States) University of California, Los Angeles	3	0	72	0	3	0
17	FW	Amr Aly	Aug 1, 1962	21	?	(United States) Columbia University	0	0	0	0	0	0
