= 1985 Afro-Asian Cup of Nations =

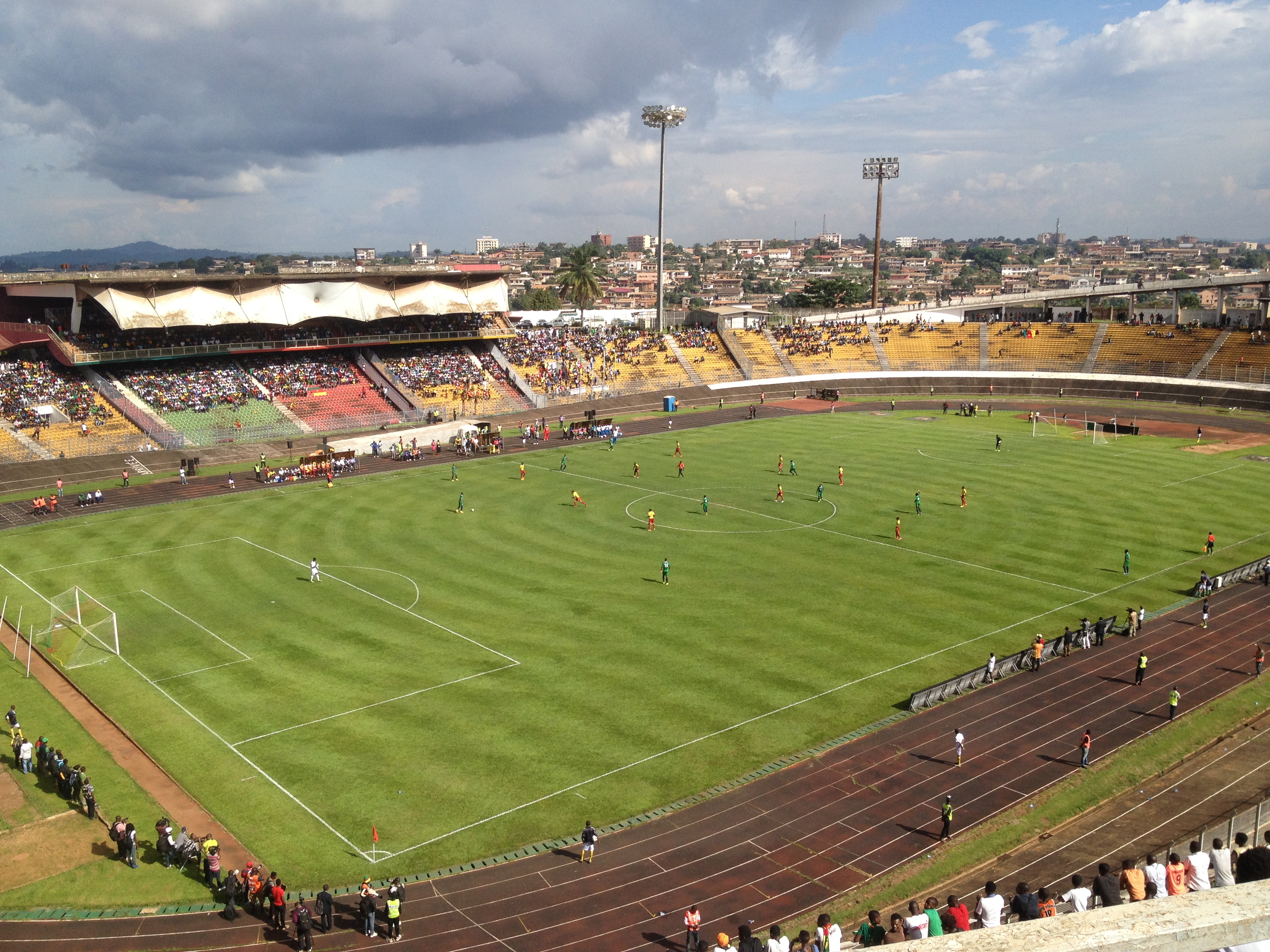
- Stade A. Ahidjo
Cameroon	Saudi Arabia
5	3

First leg
Cameroon	Saudi Arabia
4	1
- Date: 15 September 1985
- Venue: Stade Ahmadou Ahidjo, Yaoundé
- Referee: Tesfaye Gebreyesus (Ethiopia)
- Attendance: 80,000

Second leg
Saudi Arabia	Cameroon
2	1
- Date: 4 October 1985
- Venue: King Fahd Stadium, Ta'if
- Referee: Jassim Mandi (Bahrain)
- Attendance: 20,000

The 1985 Afro-Asian Cup of Nations was the second edition of the Afro-Asian Cup of Nations, it was contested by Cameroon, winners of the 1984 African Cup of Nations, and Saudi Arabia, winners of the 1984 AFC Asian Cup. Cameroon won on aggregate over the two legs. This edition were helds after the 1978 edition between Ghana and Iran which was normally the first edition one, however it was cancelled after the 1st leg.

== Qualified teams ==
Country	Qualified as	Previous appearance in tournament
Cameroon	1984 African Cup of Nations champions	Debut
Saudi Arabia	1984 Asian Cup champions	Debut

== Match details ==
=== First leg ===
15 September 1985
17:00 UTC+1

Cameroon	4–1	Saudi Arabia
Omam-Biyik 8'; Milla 33' 84'; Kundé 87' (pen.)	Report	Abu Dawud 44'

Stade Ahmadou Ahidjo, Yaoundé
Attendance: 80,000
Referee: Tesfaye Gebreyesus (Ethiopia)

Cameroon	Saudi Arabia

Cameroon:
GK	1	André Marie Boé
DF	–	Charles Toubé
DF	–	Christian Ebwéa Bilé
DF	5	Emmanuel Kundé (c)
DF	–	Voungai Salomon
MF	–	Émile Mbouh
MF	–	André Kana-Biyik
MF	–	Jean-Jacques Missé-Missé	(substituted off) 1
MF	–	Louis-Paul Mfédé
FW	9	Roger Milla	(substituted off) 2
FW	–	François Omam-Biyik
Substitutes:
GK	–	Jacques Songo'o
DF	–	Victor N'Dip
MF	–	Oumarou Mamoudou	(substituted on) 1
MF	–	Laurent Ebendeng Mengue	(substituted on) 2
FW	–	Adama "Zico" Haman
Manager:
(France) Claude Le Roy

Saudi Arabia:
GK	1	Abdullah Al-Deayea
DF	4	Sameer Abdulshaker
DF	5	Samadou	(substituted off) 79'
DF	6	Ahmad Al-Bishi
DF	7	Fahad Al-Bishi
MF	10	Fahad Al-Musaibeah
MF	12	Bandar Serour
MF	13	Mohamed Abd Al-Jawad
FW	9	Majed Abdullah
FW	14	Saleh Khalifa Al-Dosari
FW	18	Hussam Abu Dawud
Substitutes:
DF	3	Hussein Al-Bishi	(substituted on) 75'
Manager:
Khalil Al-Zayani

Assistant referees:
... ... (...)
... ... (...)
Fourth official:
... ... (...)

Man of the Match:
Roger Milla (Cameroon)

=== Second leg ===
4 October 1985
16:00 UTC+3

Saudi Arabia	2–1	Cameroon
Mohammed 9'; Abd Al-Jawad 86'	Report	Omam-Biyik 57'

King Fahd Stadium, Ta'if
Attendance: 20,000
Referee: Jassim Mandi (Bahrain)

Saudi Arabia	Cameroon

Saudi Arabia:
GK	1	Abdullah Al-Deayea
DF	2	Nasser Al-Mansoor
DF	4	Sameer Abdulshaker
DF	5	Saleh Nu'eimeh (c)
DF	6	Ahmad Al-Bishi	(substituted off) 70'
DF	–	Jamal Mohammed
MF	7	Fahad Al-Bishi
MF	10	Fahad Al-Musaibeah
MF	13	Mohamed Abd Al-Jawad
FW	18	Hussam Abu Dawud	(substituted off) 80'
FW	–	Mohaisen Al-Jam'an
Substitutes:
MF	–	Naser Al-Dossari	(substituted on) 75'
FW	–	Saleh Khalifa Al-Dosari	(substituted on) 80'
Manager:
Khalil Al-Zayani

Cameroon:
GK	1	André Marie Boé
DF	–	Charles Toubé
DF	–	Voungai Salomon
DF	–	Christian Ebwéa Bilé
DF	–	Edmond Enoka
DF	5	Emmanuel Kundé (c)
MF	–	Émile Mbouh
MF	–	Louis-Paul Mfédé
MF	–	Oumarou Mamoudou	(substituted off) 2
FW	–	François Omam-Biyik
FW	–	Adama "Zico" Haman	(substituted off) 1
Substitutes:
MF	–	Dagobert Dang	(substituted on) 1
MF	–	Jean-Jacques Missé-Missé	(substituted on) 2
Manager:
(France) Claude Le Roy

Assistant referees:
... ... (...)
... ... (...)
Fourth official:
... ... (...)

Man of the Match:
... ... (...)

== Winners ==
Cameroon won 5–3 on aggregate.

1985 Afro-Asian Cup of Nations

Cameroon
1st title
