= Morocco at the 1984 Summer Olympics =

- IOC code: MAR
- NOC: Moroccan Olympic Committee

in Los Angeles
- Competitors: 34 (33 men, 1 woman) in 6 sports
- Flag bearer: Lahcen Samsam Akka
- Medals Ranked 18th: Gold 2 Silver 0 Bronze 0 Total 2

Summer Olympics appearances (overview)
- 1960; 1964; 1968; 1972; 1976; 1980; 1984; 1988; 1992; 1996; 2000; 2004; 2008; 2012; 2016; 2020; 2024

Morocco competed at the 1984 Summer Olympics in Los Angeles, United States. The nation returned to the Summer Games after participating in the American-led boycott of the 1980 Summer Olympics. 34 competitors, 33 men and 1 woman, took part in 18 events in 6 sports.

== Medalists ==
Medal	Name	Sport	Event	Date
Gold	Nawal El Moutawakel	Athletics	Women's 400 metres hurdles	8 August
Gold	Saïd Aouita	Athletics	Men's 5000 metres	11 August

== Athletics ==
Men's 1,500 metres

- Faouzi Lahbi

- Qualifying Heat – 3:47.54 (→ did not advance)

Men's 5,000 metres

- Saïd Aouita

- Heat – 13:45.66
- Semifinals – 13:28.39
- Final – 13:05.59 (→ Gold Medal)

Women's 400m Hurdles

- Nawal El Moutawakel

- Heat – 56.49
- Semifinal – 55.65
- Final – 54.61 (→ Gold Medal)

== Boxing ==
Men's Light Flyweight (– 48 kg)

- Mahjoub Mjirich
  1. First Round – Lost to Agapito Gómez (Spain), on points (2:3)

== Cycling ==
Four cyclists represented Morocco in 1984.

Individual road race

- Mustapha Najjari – +22:30 (→ 54th place)
- Mustapha Afandi – did not finish (→ no ranking)
- Brahim Ben Bouilla – did not finish (→ no ranking)
- Ahmed Rhail – did not finish (→ no ranking)

== Football ==
=== Men's team competition ===
- Preliminary Round (Group C)

- Morocco – West Germany 0 – 2
- Morocco – Saudi Arabia 1 – 0
- Morocco – Brazil 0 – 2

- Quarter Finals

- → Did not advance

- Team Roster:

- ( 1.) Ezaki Badou
- ( 2.) Saad Dahan
- ( 3.) Abdelmajid Lands
- ( 4.) Mostafa Elbiyaz
- ( 5.) Noureddine Bouyahiaoui
- ( 6.) Abdelmajid Dolmy
- ( 7.) Mustapha Elhadaoui
- ( 8.) Driss Mouttaqui
- ( 9.) Hassan Hanini
- (10.) Mohammed Timoumi
- (11.) Khalid Elbied
- (12.) Salaheddine Hmied
- (13.) Mustapha Merry
- (14.) Mohamed Safri
- (15.) Lahcen Ouadani
- (16.) Hamid Janina
- (17.) Abdeslam Elghrissi
