= 1994 FIFA World Cup Group B =

Football tournament group stage

Group B of the 1994 FIFA World Cup was one of six groups of four teams competing at the 1994 World Cup in the United States. The first match was played June 19, 1994, and the final games took place simultaneously on June 28, 1994.

The group consisted of Brazil, Russia, Cameroon and Sweden. Brazil won the group and Sweden finished second. Brazil would go on to win the tournament in the final against Italy, after meeting Sweden again and defeating them in the semi finals. Sweden in turn won the bronze medal match, so two teams from this group ended up on the medal podium.

== Standings ==
Pos	Team	Pld	W	D	L	GF	GA	GD	Pts	Qualification
1	Brazil	3	2	1	0	6	1	+5	7	Advance to knockout stage
2	Sweden	3	1	2	0	6	4	+2	5	Advance to knockout stage
3	Russia	3	1	0	2	7	6	+1	3	
4	Cameroon	3	0	1	2	3	11	−8	1	

Source: FIFA

== Matches ==
All times local (EDT/UTC–4, CDT/UTC–5, PDT/UTC–7)

=== Cameroon vs Sweden ===
June 19, 1994
4:30 p.m. PDT (UTC–7)

Cameroon	2–2	Sweden
Embé 31'; Omam-Biyik 47'		Ljung 8'; Dahlin 75'

Rose Bowl, Pasadena
Attendance: 93,194
Referee: Alberto Tejada Noriega (Peru)

Cameroon	Sweden

GK	1	Joseph-Antoine Bell
DF	3	Rigobert Song
MF	6	Thomas Libiih
FW	7	François Omam-Biyik
MF	8	Émile Mbouh	(yellow card) 5'
FW	10	Louis-Paul M'Fédé		(substituted off) 88'
DF	13	Raymond Kalla
DF	14	Stephen Tataw (c)
DF	15	Hans Agbo
MF	17	Marc-Vivien Foé
FW	19	David Embé		(substituted off) 81'
Substitutions:
MF	11	Emmanuel Maboang		(substituted on) 88'
FW	20	Georges Mouyémé		(substituted on) 81'
Manager:
(France) Henri Michel

GK	1	Thomas Ravelli
RB	2	Roland Nilsson
CB	3	Patrik Andersson
CB	4	Joachim Björklund
LB	5	Roger Ljung
RM	8	Klas Ingesson		(substituted off) 76'
CM	9	Jonas Thern (c)
CM	6	Stefan Schwarz
LM	21	Jesper Blomqvist		(substituted off) 61'
SS	11	Tomas Brolin
CF	10	Martin Dahlin	(yellow card) 72'
Substitutions:
RM	7	Henrik Larsson		(substituted on) 61'
FW	19	Kennet Andersson		(substituted on) 76'
Manager:
Tommy Svensson

Assistant referees:
Douglas James (Trinidad and Tobago)
Abdulla Al Ghattan (Bahrain)
Fourth official:
Jamal Al Sharif (Syria)

=== Brazil vs Russia ===
June 20, 1994
1:00 p.m. PDT (UTC–7)

Brazil	2–0	Russia
Romário 26'; Raí 52' (pen.)

Stanford Stadium, Stanford
Attendance: 81,061
Referee: Lim Kee Chong (Mauritius)

Brazil	Russia

GK	1	Taffarel
RB	2	Jorginho
CB	3	Ricardo Rocha	(substituted off) 75'
CB	15	Márcio Santos
LB	16	Leonardo
DM	5	Mauro Silva
DM	8	Dunga	(substituted off) 85'
AM	10	Raí (c)
AM	9	Zinho
CF	7	Bebeto
CF	11	Romário
Substitutions:
DF	13	Aldair	(substituted on) 75'
MF	17	Mazinho	(substituted on) 85'
Manager:
Carlos Alberto Parreira

GK	16	Dmitri Kharine (c)
DF	2	Dmitri Kuznetsov	(yellow card) 78'
DF	3	Sergei Gorlukovich
DF	5	Yuriy Nikiforov	(yellow card) 61'
DF	6	Vladislav Ternavsky
MF	7	Andrey Pyatnitsky
MF	10	Valeri Karpin
FW	15	Dmitri Radchenko		(substituted off) 77'
MF	17	Ilya Tsymbalar
DF	21	Dmitri Khlestov	(yellow card) 65'
FW	22	Sergei Yuran		(substituted off) 55'
Substitutions:
FW	9	Oleg Salenko		(substituted on) 55'
MF	13	Aleksandr Borodyuk		(substituted on) 77'
Manager:
Pavel Sadyrin

Assistant referees:
El Jilali Rharib (Morocco)
Domenico Ramicone (Italy)
Fourth official:
Fabio Baldas (Italy)

=== Brazil vs Cameroon ===
June 24, 1994
1:00 p.m. PDT (UTC–7)

Brazil	3–0	Cameroon
Romário 39'; Márcio Santos 66'; Bebeto 73'

Stanford Stadium, Stanford
Attendance: 83,401
Referee: Arturo Brizio Carter (Mexico)

Brazil	Cameroon

GK	1	Taffarel
RB	2	Jorginho
CB	13	Aldair
CB	15	Márcio Santos
LB	16	Leonardo
CM	5	Mauro Silva	(yellow card) 44'
CM	8	Dunga
RM	10	Raí (c)		(substituted off) 81'
LM	9	Zinho		(substituted off) 75'
CF	7	Bebeto
CF	11	Romário
Substitutions:
FW	18	Paulo Sérgio		(substituted on) 75'
FW	19	Müller		(substituted on) 81'
Manager:
Carlos Alberto Parreira

GK	1	Joseph-Antoine Bell
DF	3	Rigobert Song	(red card) 63'
MF	6	Thomas Libiih
FW	7	François Omam-Biyik
MF	8	Emile Mbouh
FW	10	Louis-Paul Mfédé		(substituted off) 71'
DF	13	Raymond Kalla	(yellow card) 37'
DF	14	Stephen Tataw (c)	(yellow card) 8'
DF	15	Hans Agbo
MF	17	Marc-Vivien Foé
FW	19	David Embé		(substituted off) 64'
Substitutions:
FW	9	Roger Milla		(substituted on) 64'
MF	11	Emmanuel Maboang		(substituted on) 71'
Manager:
(France) Henri Michel

Assistant referees:
Douglas James (Trinidad and Tobago)
Carl-Johan Meyer Christensen (Denmark)
Fourth official:
Peter Mikkelsen (Denmark)

=== Sweden vs Russia ===
June 24, 1994
7:30 p.m. EDT (UTC–4)

Sweden	3–1	Russia
Brolin 39' (pen.); Dahlin 60', 82'		Salenko 4' (pen.)

Pontiac Silverdome, Pontiac
Attendance: 71,528
Referee: Joël Quiniou (France)

Sweden	Russia

GK	1	Thomas Ravelli
RB	2	Roland Nilsson
CB	3	Patrik Andersson
CB	4	Joachim Björklund		(substituted off) 89'
LB	5	Roger Ljung
RM	11	Tomas Brolin
CM	9	Jonas Thern (c)
CM	6	Stefan Schwarz	(yellow card) 52'
LM	8	Klas Ingesson
CF	10	Martin Dahlin	(yellow card) 58'
CF	19	Kennet Andersson	(yellow card) 42'	(substituted off) 84'
Substitutions:
FW	7	Henrik Larsson		(substituted on) 84'
CB	20	Magnus Erlingmark		(substituted on) 89'
Manager:
Tommy Svensson

GK	16	Dmitri Kharine (c)	(yellow card) 34'
DF	2	Dmitri Kuznetsov
DF	3	Sergei Gorlukovich	(yellow card) 1' (yellow-red card) 49'
DF	5	Yuriy Nikiforov
MF	8	Dmitri Popov		(substituted off) 41'
FW	9	Oleg Salenko
MF	13	Aleksandr Borodyuk		(substituted off) 51'
FW	15	Dmitri Radchenko
DF	18	Viktor Onopko
MF	19	Aleksandr Mostovoi
DF	21	Dmitri Khlestov
Substitutions:
DF	4	Dmitri Galiamin		(substituted on) 51'
MF	10	Valeri Karpin		(substituted on) 41'
Manager:
Pavel Sadyrin

Assistant referees:
Davoud Fanaei (Iran)
Abdel-Magid Hassan (Egypt)
Fourth official:
Neji Jouini (Tunisia)

=== Russia vs Cameroon ===
June 28, 1994
1:00 p.m. PDT (UTC–7)

Russia	6–1	Cameroon
Salenko 15', 41', 44' (pen.), 72', 75'; Radchenko 81'		Milla 46'

Stanford Stadium, Stanford
Attendance: 74,914
Referee: Jamal Al Sharif (Syria)

Russia	Cameroon

GK	1	Stanislav Cherchesov
DF	5	Yuriy Nikiforov	(yellow card) 90'
DF	6	Vladislav Ternavsky
FW	9	Oleg Salenko
MF	10	Valeri Karpin	(yellow card) 57'
DF	12	Omari Tetradze
FW	14	Igor Korneev		(substituted off) 65'
MF	17	Ilya Tsymbalar
DF	18	Viktor Onopko (c)
MF	20	Igor Lediakhov		(substituted off) 78'
DF	21	Dmitri Khlestov	(yellow card) 87'
Substitutions:
FW	11	Vladimir Beschastnykh		(substituted on) 78'
FW	15	Dmitri Radchenko		(substituted on) 65'
Manager:
Pavel Sadyrin

GK	22	Jacques Songo'o	(yellow card) 44'
MF	2	André Kana-Biyik	(yellow card) 12'
DF	5	Victor Ndip
MF	6	Thomas Libiih
FW	7	François Omam-Biyik
FW	10	Louis-Paul Mfédé		(substituted off) 45'
DF	13	Raymond Kalla
DF	14	Stephen Tataw (c)
DF	15	Hans Agbo
MF	17	Marc-Vivien Foé
FW	19	David Embé		(substituted off) 47'
Substitutions:
FW	9	Roger Milla		(substituted on) 45'
FW	16	Alphonse Tchami		(substituted on) 47'
Manager:
Henri Michel

Assistant referees:
Gordon Dunster (Australia)
Jan Dolstra (Netherlands)
Fourth official:
Mario van der Ende (Netherlands)

=== Brazil vs Sweden ===
June 28, 1994
4:00 p.m. EDT (UTC–4)

Brazil	1–1	Sweden
Romário 47'		K. Andersson 23'

Pontiac Silverdome, Pontiac
Attendance: 77,217
Referee: Sándor Puhl (Hungary)

Brazil	Sweden

GK	1	Taffarel
RB	2	Jorginho
DF	13	Aldair	(yellow card) 68' (Note: Mistake in the FIFA report. The yellow card was shown in the second half, in the 68th minute, not the 23rd minute as in the FIFA report.)
DF	15	Márcio Santos
LB	16	Leonardo
CM	5	Mauro Silva		(substituted off) 45'
CM	8	Dunga
LM	9	Zinho
RM	10	Raí (c)		(substituted off) 83'
CF	7	Bebeto
CF	11	Romário
Substitutions:
CM	17	Mazinho		(substituted on) 45'
RM	18	Paulo Sérgio		(substituted on) 83'
Manager:
Carlos Alberto Parreira

GK	1	Thomas Ravelli
RB	2	Roland Nilsson
CB	3	Patrik Andersson
CB	14	Pontus Kåmark
LB	5	Roger Ljung
RM	7	Henrik Larsson		(substituted off) 65'
CM	9	Jonas Thern (c)
CM	6	Stefan Schwarz		(substituted off) 75'
LM	8	Klas Ingesson
SS	11	Tomas Brolin
CF	19	Kennet Andersson
Substitutions:
LM	21	Jesper Blomqvist		(substituted on) 65'
CM	18	Håkan Mild	(yellow card) 83'	(substituted on) 75'
Manager:
Tommy Svensson

Assistant referees:
Sándor Márton (Hungary)
Luc Matthys (Belgium)
Fourth official:
Manuel Díaz Vega (Spain)

== See also ==
- Brazil at the FIFA World Cup
- Cameroon at the FIFA World Cup
- Russia at the FIFA World Cup
- Sweden at the FIFA World Cup
