= Mohammad Fadel (disambiguation) =

Mohammad Fadel may refer to:

- Mohammad Fadel, a Professor and Toronto Research Chair for the Law and Economics
- Mohammed Fadel, Egyptian film director
- Mohammed Fadel (footballer), Iraqi footballer
