= 1989 King Cup =

Tournament details
- Country: Saudi Arabia
- Dates: 11 – 22 May 1989
- Teams: 16

Final positions
- Champions: Al Hilal (6th title)
- Runners-up: Al-Nassr
- Asian Cup Winners' Cup: Al Hilal

Tournament statistics
- Matches played: 15
- Goals scored: 45 (3 per match)
- Top goal scorer: Majed Abdullah (5 goals)

The 1989 King Cup was the 31st season of knockout competition since its establishment in 1956. Al-Ittihad were the defending champions for this season, but they were eliminated by Al-Nassr in Round of 16.

Al Hilal won their sixth title after beating Al Nassr 3–0 in the final. As winners of the tournament, Al-Hilal qualified for the 1990–91 Asian Cup Winners' Cup.

== Bracket ==
Round of 16
H	Al-Qadisiyah	4
A	Al-Riyadh	3
A	Al-Nahda	1
H	Ohod	4
H	Al-Tai	0
A	Al Hilal	1
A	Al-Shabab (pen.)	0 (5)
H	Al-Ettifaq	0 (4)
A	Al-Nassr	2
H	Al-Ittihad	0
A	Al-Wehda	1 (3)
H	Hajer (pen.)	1 (4)
H	Al-Rawdhah	2
A	Al-Taawoun	3
H	Al-Ahli	2
A	Al-Raed	0

Quarter-finals
H	Al-Qadisiyah	1
A	Ohod	0
A	Al Hilal (aet)	2
H	Al-Shabab	1
A	Al-Nassr	3
H	Hajer	0
H	Al-Taawoun	0
A	Al-Ahli	1

Semi-finals
A	Al-Qadisiyah	0
H	Al Hilal	1
A	Al-Nassr (aet)	3
H	Al-Ahli	1

Final
–	Al Hilal	3
–	Al-Nassr	0

Note: H: Home team, A: Away team

== Round of 16 ==
The matches of the Round of 16 were held on 11 and 12 May 1989.

11 May 1989 5	Al-Tai	0–1	Al Hilal	Ha'il
20:10			Nu'eimeh 61'	Stadium: Prince Abdul Aziz bin Musa'ed Stadium; Referee: Hassan Al-Buhairi

11 May 1989 4	Al-Ettifaq	1–1 (a.e.t.) (3–4 p)	Al-Shabab	Khobar
20:10	Al-Dosari 60'		M. Al-Owairan 9'	Stadium: Prince Saud bin Jalawi Stadium; Referee: Omer Al Mehannah
	Penalties
	Al-Saleh (penalty scored); Hamood (penalty scored); Al-Dughaim (penalty scored); Bakhashwain (penalty missed); Mohammed (penalty missed)		(penalty scored) Al-Razqan; (penalty scored) Sufyan; (penalty scored) S. Al-Owairan; (penalty scored) Al-Roomi

11 May 1989 6	Ohod	4–1	Al-Nahda	Medina
16:10	Anbar 4', 19', 34'; Almas 66'		Al-Denini 58'	Stadium: Prince Mohammed bin Abdul Aziz Stadium; Referee: Mohammed Al-Nofal

11 May 1989 2	Hajer	1–1 (a.e.t.) (3–2 p)	Al-Wehda	Al-Hasa
20:10	Abo Shaqra 108'		Khogeer 93'	Stadium: Prince Abdullah bin Jalawi Stadium; Referee: Mohammed Al-Harkan
	Penalties
	K. Al-Khatem (penalty scored); Al-Khamis (penalty scored); A. Al-Khatem (penalty scored); Al-Khalifa (penalty missed); Al-Atani (penalty missed)		(penalty scored) Atef Al-Hazmi; (penalty scored) Osama; (penalty missed) Khogeer; (penalty missed) Alwi; (penalty missed) Huwaidi

11 May 1989 3	Al-Ittihad	0–2	Al-Nassr	Jeddah
20:10			Abdullah 36' (pen.), 47'	Stadium: Youth Welfare Stadium in Jeddah; Referee: Abdullah Al-Nasser

12 May 1989 7	Al-Qadisiyah	4–3	Al-Riyadh	Khobar
20:10	Al-Bishi 7', 70'; Al-Farhan 55'; Bo Rasheed 59'		Al-Najrani 25', 38'; 51'	Stadium: Prince Saud bin Jalawi Stadium; Referee: Ahmed Al-Hazmi

12 May 1989 8	Al-Rawdhah	2–3	Al-Taawoun	Al-Hasa
20:10	Wasmi 53' (pen.); Al-Dookhi 73'		Al-Nu'eimeh 27'; Al-Badawi 34'; Al-Mousa 85'	Stadium: Prince Abdullah bin Jalawi Stadium; Referee: Abdullah Al-Khaldi

12 May 1989 1	Al-Ahli	2–0	Al-Raed	Jeddah
20:10	H. Abu Dawood 20'; Abd Al-Jawad 65'			Stadium: Youth Welfare Stadium in Jeddah; Referee: Mohammed Al-Shareef

== Quarter-finals ==
The Quarter-final matches were held on 15 May 1989.

15 May 1989 9	Al-Shabab	1–2 (a.e.t.)	Al Hilal	Riyadh
20:30	S. Al-Owairan 19'		Mubarak 10'; H. Al-Habashi (pen.)	Stadium: Youth Welfare Stadium in Al-Malaz; Referee: Omer Al Mehannah

15 May 1989 10	Hajer	0–3	Al-Nassr	Al-Hasa
20:30			Abdullah 25' (pen.), 75'; Al-Masoud 65'	Stadium: Prince Abdullah bin Jalawi Stadium; Referee: Fahad Al-Mohawis

15 May 1989 11	Al-Taawoun	0–1	Al-Ahli	Buraidah
20:30			H. Abu Dawood 54'	Stadium: Prince Abdullah Sport City Stadium; Referee: Mohammed Foda

15 May 1989 12	Al-Qadisiyah	3–1	Ohod	Khobar
20:30	Bo Rasheed 19'; Al-Bishi 52' (pen.); Al-Farhan 73'		Anbar 76'	Stadium: Prince Saud bin Jalawi Stadium; Referee: Abdulrahman Al-Zaid

== Semi-finals ==
The Semi-final matches were held on 18 May 1989.

18 May 1989 13	Al Hilal	1–0	Al-Qadisiyah	Riyadh
20:30	Jaze'e 37'	Report		Stadium: Youth Welfare Stadium in Al-Malaz; Referee: Omar Al-Shareef

18 May 1989 14	Al-Ahli	1–3 (a.e.t.)	Al-Nassr	Jeddah
20:30	H. Abu Dawood 81'	Report	Abdullah 75'; Al-Bishi 96'; Al-Jam'an 110'	Stadium: Youth Welfare Stadium in Jeddah; Referee: Omer Al Mehannah

== Final ==
The final was played between Al-Hilal and Al-Nassr in the Youth Welfare Stadium in Jeddah. Al-Hilal were appearing in their 12th final while Al-Nassr were appearing in their 9th final.

22 May 1989
20:00

Al-Hilal	3–0	Al-Nassr
Al-Habashi 21'; Al-Tekhaifi 24'; Hussein Al-Bishi 69'	Report

Youth Welfare Stadium in Jeddah, Jeddah
Attendance: 36,000
Referee: Omer Al Mehannah

Team details

Al-Hilal
Al-Nassr

GK	1	(Saudi Arabia) Saleh Al-Saloomi
RB	2	(Saudi Arabia) Abdulrahmen Al-Tekhaifi
CB	5	(Saudi Arabia) Saleh Al-Nu'eimeh (c)
CB	3	(Saudi Arabia) Hussein Al-Bishi
LB	16	(Saudi Arabia) Hussein Al-Habashi
MF	10	(Saudi Arabia) Abadi Al-Hathlool	(substituted off) 53'
MF	6	(Saudi Arabia) Fahad Al-Musaibeah
MF	8	(Saudi Arabia) Khalid Al-Temawi
FW	11	(Saudi Arabia) Saad Mubarak
FW	7	(Saudi Arabia) Yousef Jazea	(substituted off) ??'
FW	15	(Saudi Arabia) Yousuf Al-Thunayan
Substitutes:
MF	14	(Saudi Arabia) Meshari Al-Owairan	(substituted on) ??'
MF	19	(Saudi Arabia) Tariq Al-Awadhi	(substituted on) 53'
Manager:
(Brazil) Candinho

GK	1	(Saudi Arabia) Khaled Al-Sibyani
RB	2	(Saudi Arabia) Musaed Al-Torair
CB	3	(Saudi Arabia) Nasser Al-Murshad
CB	5	(Saudi Arabia) Saleh Al-Mutlaq
LB	15	(Saudi Arabia) Nasser Al-Fahad	(substituted off) ??'
MF	16	(Saudi Arabia) Khaled Al-Hazaa
MF	7	(Saudi Arabia) Fahad Al-Masoud	(substituted off) 47'
MF	10	(Saudi Arabia) Yousef Khamees (c)
FW	8	(Saudi Arabia) Fahad Al-Bishi
FW	9	(Saudi Arabia) Majed Abdullah
FW	11	(Saudi Arabia) Mohaisen Al-Jam'an
Substitutes:
DF	6	(Saudi Arabia) Mohammed Al-Ateeq	(substituted on) ??'
FW	17	(Saudi Arabia) Saeed Al-Qahtani	(substituted on) 47'
Manager:
(Brazil) Joel Santana

King Cup
1989 Winners
Al-Hilal
6th Title

== Top goalscorers ==
Rank	Player	Club	Goals
1	(Saudi Arabia) Majed Abdullah	Al-Nassr	5
2	(Saudi Arabia) Yousef Al-Anbar	Ohod	4
3	(Saudi Arabia) Ahmad Al-Bishi	Al-Qadsiah	3
3	(Saudi Arabia) Hussam Abu Dawood	Al-Ahli	3
3	(Saudi Arabia) Hussain Al-Habshi	Al-Hilal	3
