= Sultan Waleed Jamaan =

Qatari footballer (born 1962)

Personal information
- Date of birth: 14 May 1962 (age 64)
- Place of birth: Doha, Qatar
- Height: 1.72 m (5 ft 8 in)
- Position: Defender

Senior career*
Years	Team	Apps	(Gls)
1980s	Al-Tadamun		

International career
1983–1984	Qatar		
- * Club domestic league appearances and goals

Sultan Waleed Jamaan (born 14 May 1962) is a Qatari footballer. He competed in the men's tournament at the 1984 Summer Olympics.
