= Edmond Enoka =

Cameroonian footballer

Personal information
- Full name: Edmond Enoka
- Date of birth: December 17, 1955 (age 70)
- Place of birth: Cameroon

International career
Years	Team	Apps	(Gls)
- Cameroon
Medal record
Men's football
Representing Cameroon
Africa Cup of Nations
Runner-up	1986 Egypt
Afro-Asian Cup of Nations
Winner	1985 Cameroon

Edmond Enoka (born December 17, 1955, in Douala) is a Cameroonian retired professional footballer who played as a defender. He was an unused reserve for the Cameroon national football team at the 1982 FIFA World Cup and the 1984 African Cup of Nations finals.

== Career ==
Enoka played club football for Union Douala, Caïman Douala, Dynamo Douala, and Canon Yaoundé.

Enoka made several appearances for the Cameroon national football team, including playing in the group stage of the 1982 African Cup of Nations finals and a friendly against Saudi Arabia on 4 October 1985.

== Honours ==
Cameroon

- African Cup of Nations: runner-up, 1986
- Afro-Asian Cup of Nations: 1985
