= Almir (footballer, born 1953) =

Brazilian footballer

Personal information
- Full name: Almir José Gil
- Date of birth: 28 September 1953 (age 73)
- Place of birth: Florianópolis, Brazil
- Position: Midfielder

Youth career
- –1973: Figueirense

Senior career*
Years	Team	Apps	(Gls)
1973–1976	Figueirense		
1976–1977	Avaí		
1978–1979	Portuguesa		
1979–1980	Coritiba		
1981–1983	São Paulo	195	(2)
1984	Portuguesa		
1985–1987	Coritiba		
1987–1989	Avaí		
1989	Coritiba		
- * Club domestic league appearances and goals as of 30 August 2023

Almir José Gil (born 28 September 1953), simply known as Almir, is a Brazilian former professional footballer who played as a midfielder.

== Career ==
Almir started his career at Figueirense, and later moved to the rival Avai. Made a great career in São Paulo with almost 200 appearances (195 in total), but it was in Coritiba where he reached his apex, being part of the 1985 Brazilian champion squad. After retiring, graduated teacher in physical education, and returned to Figueirense as coordinator of the youth categories.

== Personal life ==
Almir is brother of Sérgio Gil and Tonho Gil.

== Honours ==
=== São Paulo ===
- Campeonato Paulista: 1980, 1981

=== Coritiba ===
- Campeonato Brasileiro: 1985
- Campeonato Paranaense: 1978, 1979, 1986

=== Avaí ===
- Campeonato Catarinense: 1988
