= Sérgio Gil (footballer, born 1970) =

Brazilian footballer

Personal information
- Full name: Sérgio dos Santos Gil
- Date of birth: 22 July 1970
- Place of birth: Florianópolis, Brazil
- Date of death: 9 July 1989 (aged 18)
- Place of death: Barra do Turvo, Brazil
- Position: Midfielder

Youth career
- –1988: Figueirense

Senior career*
Years	Team	Apps	(Gls)
1988–1989	Corinthians	18	(3)

International career
1989	Brazil U20	5	(0)
- * Club domestic league appearances and goals

Sérgio dos Santos Gil (22 July 1970 – 9 July 1989) was a Brazilian footballer who played as a midfielder. He was the brother of Almir and Tonho Gil.

== Death ==
Sérgio Gil died in a car accident after a head-on collision with another vehicle on the Régis Bittencourt highway.

== Career statistics ==
=== Club ===
Club	Season	League			State League		Cup		Continental		Other		Total	
Club	Season	Division	Apps	Goals	Apps	Goals	Apps	Goals	Apps	Goals	Apps	Goals	Apps	Goals
Corinthians	1988	Série A	18	3	0	0	0	0	0	0	0	0	18	3
Career total			18	3	0	0	0	0	0	0	0	0	18	3
