= Dominique Bijotat =

French footballer and manager (born 1961)

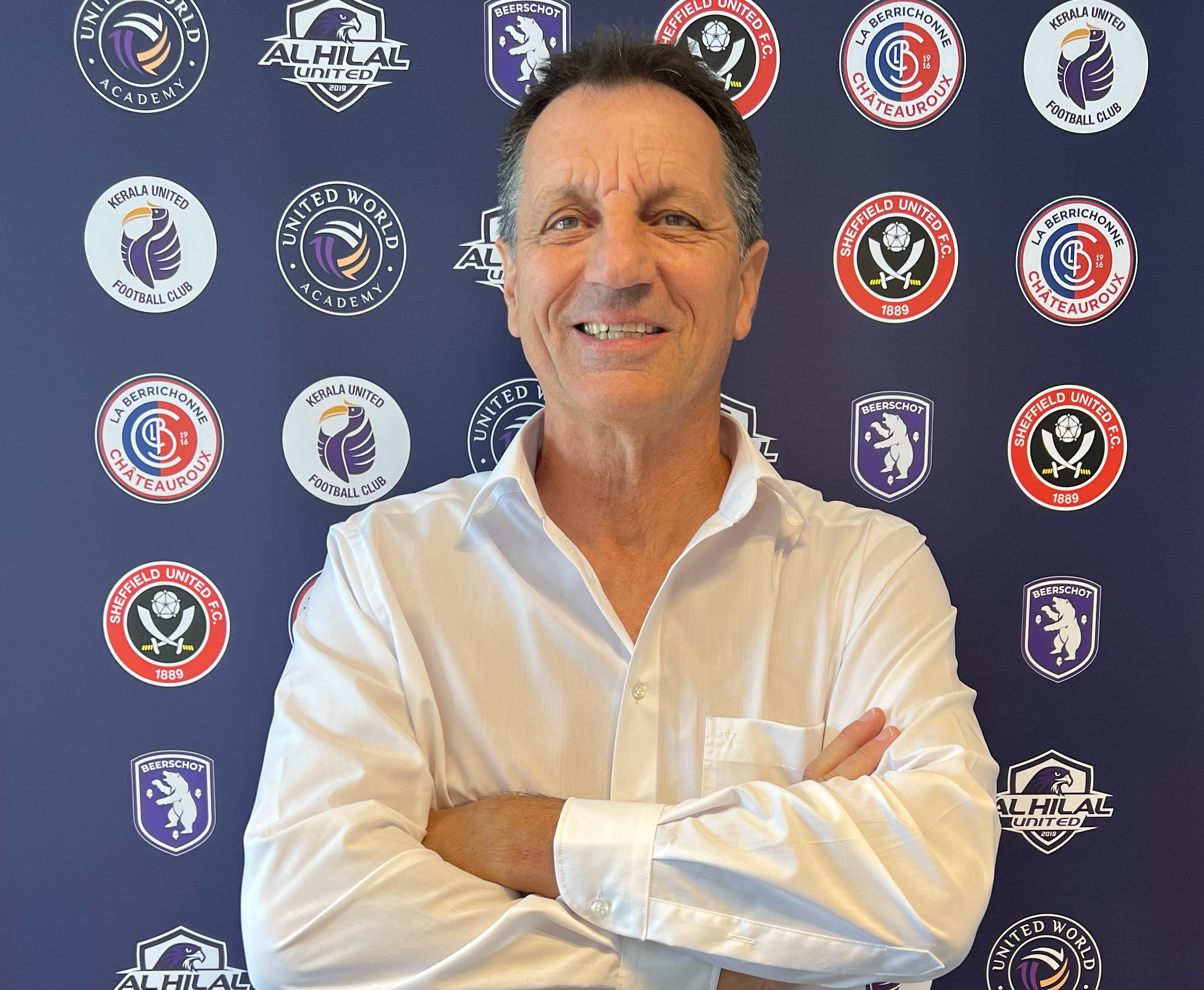

Personal information
- Date of birth: 3 January 1961 (age 65)
- Place of birth: Chassignolles, France
- Height: 1.77 m (5 ft 10 in)
- Position: Midfielder

Youth career
- 1968–1976: Montgivray FC

Senior career*
Years	Team	Apps	(Gls)
1976–87	Monaco	185	(16)
1987–88	Bordeaux	37	(1)
1988–91	Monaco	40	(0)
1991–94	Châteauroux		

International career
1982–88	France	8	(0)

Managerial career
- 2002–2004: Ajaccio
- 2005–2006: Sochaux
- 2008–2009: Châteauroux
- 2010–2012: Metz
- 2015–2016: JS Kabylie
- 2016: Chabab Rif Al Hoceima
Medal record
Men's football
Representing France
Olympic Games
Gold medal – first place	1984 Los Angeles	Team competition
- * Club domestic league appearances and goals

Dominique Bijotat (French: [dɔminik biʒɔta]; born 3 January 1961) is a French football manager and former professional player who played as a midfielder. He obtained eight international caps (no goals) for the France national team during the 1980s.

== Club career ==
Bijotat was born in Chassignolles, Indre. Most of his career was spent with AS Monaco, playing there in two separate periods 1976–1987 and 1988–1991. He also spent one season with Bordeaux and eventually ended his playing career at Châteauroux.

== International career ==
He was a member of the national team that won the gold medal at the 1984 Summer Olympics in Los Angeles.

== Coaching career ==
After the recent home defeat against Ajaccio, the coach has quit Ligue 2 club LB Châteauroux, the team was in 16th place.

On 4 June 2010, FC Metz officials hired the former Châteauroux coach with the objective of leading the team back to Ligue 1 within two years.

His spell ended up in a nightmare as Metz was relegated in May 2012 in National for the first time, the French third division, before the last game of the season. He was even asked by the Chairman not to coach the team for the last game at home.
