= David Embé =

Cameroonian footballer

Personal information
- Full name: Jacques-David Embé
- Date of birth: November 13, 1973 (age 52)
- Place of birth: Yaoundé, Cameroon
- Height: 1.72 m (5 ft 7 1/2 in)
- Position: Striker

Senior career*
Years	Team	Apps	(Gls)
1990–1993	Racing FC Bafoussam	?	(?)
1993–1994	Os Belenenses	6	(2)
1994–1996	AEL	55	(22)
1996–1998	Tecos UAG	56	(22)
1999	Shanghai Shenhua	8	(0)
2000	Deportivo Municipal	?	(?)
2001	Chernomorets Novorossiysk	4	(0)
2001	New England Revolution	?	(?)

International career
- Cameroon U20
1993–1997	Cameroon	13	(5)
- * Club domestic league appearances and goals

Jacques-David Embé (born November 13, 1973) is a Cameroonian former soccer player who played as striker.

Embé played in various countries throughout his career, including for Belenenses at Portugal, AEL at Greece, Tecos UAG at Mexico, Shanghai Shenhua at China, Deportivo Municipal at Peru, Chernomorets Novorossiysk at Russia and New England Revolution at the United States.

He played for the Cameroon national football team from 1993 to 1997. Embé also played in the 1994 FIFA World Cup in the United States and scored in their Group B game against Sweden at the Rose Bowl in Pasadena, California in front of over 93,000 fans.

== International ==
International goals for Cameroon

Score and results list Cameroon's goal tally first.

#	Date	Venue	Opponent	Score	Result	Competition
1.	11 July 1993	Stade de l'Amitié, Cotonou, Benin	Benin	2–0	3–0	1994 African Cup of Nations qualification
2.	18 July 1993	Stade du 28 Septembre, Conakry, Guinea	Guinea	1–0	1–0	1994 FIFA World qualification
3.	25 July 1993	Ahmadou Ahidjo Stadium, Yaoundé, Cameroon	Niger	2–0	2–0	1994 African Cup of Nations qualification
4.	9 May 1994	Karaiskakis Stadium, Piraeus, Greece	Greece	1–0	3–0	Friendly
5.	19 June 1994	Rose Bowl, Pasadena, United States	Sweden	1–1	2–2	1994 FIFA World Cup
