= Hussam Nima =

Iraqi footballer

Personal information
- Full name: Hussam Nima Nasser
- Date of birth: 1 July 1955 (age 71)
- Position: Defender

Senior career*
Years	Team	Apps	(Gls)
1975-1978	Babil SC		
1978-1982	Al-Sinaa SC		
1982-1990	Al-Jaish SC		
1990-1991	Al-Sinaa SC		

International career
1984–1986	Iraq		
- * Club domestic league appearances and goals

Hussam Nima (born 1 July 1955) is a former Iraqi footballer. He competed in the men's tournament at the 1984 Summer Olympics. Hussam played for Iraq between 1984 and 1986.
