= Claude Le Roy =

French association football player and manager (born 1948)

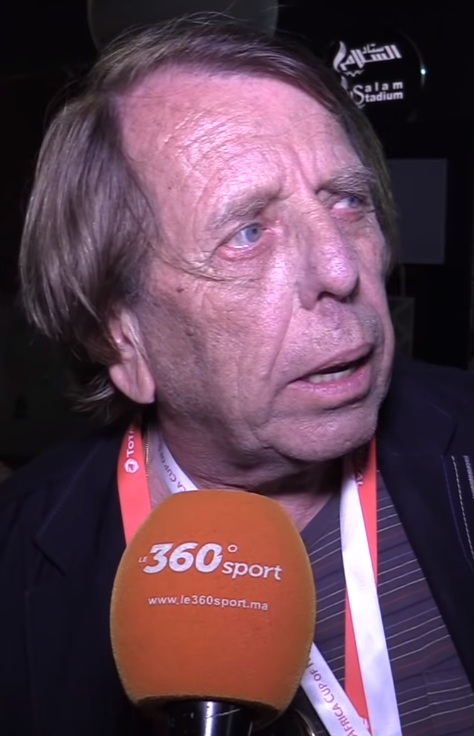
- Le Roy in Cairo, in 2019

Personal information
- Date of birth: 6 February 1948 (age 78)
- Place of birth: Bois-Normand-près-Lyre, France
- Position: Midfielder

Senior career*
Years	Team	Apps	(Gls)
1968–1970	Rouen		
1970–1973	Ajaccio		
1973–1977	Avignon Foot 84		
1977–1980	Laval		
1980–1981	Amiens		

Managerial career
- 1980–1983: Amiens
- 1983–1985: Grenoble
- 1985: Al-Shabab
- 1985–1988: Cameroon
- 1989–1992: Senegal
- 1994–1995: Malaysia
- 1998: Cameroon
- 1999–2000: Strasbourg
- 2002–2003: Shanghai Cosco
- 2004: Cambridge United
- 2004–2006: DR Congo
- 2006–2008: Ghana
- 2008–2011: Oman
- 2011: Syria
- 2011–2013: DR Congo
- 2013–2015: Congo
- 2016–2021: Togo
- 2026: Congo
Medal record
Men's football
Representing Cameroon (as manager)
Africa Cup of Nations
Winner	1988 Morocco
Runner-up	1986 Egypt
Afro-Asian Cup of Nations
Winner	1985 Cameroon
Representing Ghana (as manager)
Bronze medal – third place	2008 Ghana
- * Club domestic league appearances and goals

Claude Le Roy (French pronunciation: [klod lə ʁwa]; born 6 February 1948) is a French football manager and former player.

He gained prominence at international level coaching the Cameroon and Ghana national teams, winning the 1988 African Cup of Nations with the former.

== Managerial career ==
Le Roy has had a varied managerial career, starting out at the small French club Amiens, after taking over as manager when his playing days ended. His achievements in leading the Cameroon national team to be runners-up in the 1986 African Cup of Nations, and then champions in the 1988 competition, are often cited as his greatest managerial accomplishments. He then took charge of Senegal when they reached the quarterfinals at the 1992 African Cup of Nations, and returned to Cameroon to lead them during the World Cup in 1998. In between, he also coached Malaysia national team from 1994 to 1995.

After undertaking the role of football adviser at AC Milan in 1996, Le Roy had a spell as Director of Football at Paris Saint-Germain in the 1997–98 season. Le Roy became manager of Cambridge United for a short spell in 2004, although he only ever signed a "moral contract", and now claims he was only ever assisting his protégé Hervé Renard: "I was just helping out a friend [then-manager Hervé Renard], but we saved that club". Following his departure from Cambridge, Le Roy was appointed as the head coach of the DR Congo. In September 2006, Le Roy was named as coach of the Ghana national team.

In February 2008, Le Roy led Ghana to 14th position in the FIFA World Rankings, their highest position ever, but quit the post in May 2008.

He started coaching the Oman national team in July 2008. Oman desperately needed a solid coach after disappointing Gulf Cup and Asian Cup performances, and in January 2009, Le Roy led them to victory in the 19th Arabian Gulf Cup held in Muscat. During the competition, Le Roy extended his deal with Oman for a further four years.

He became the new coach of the Syria national team in March 2011, but resigned in May of the same year.

On 5 December 2013, he became the new coach of the Congo national team. On 17 November 2015, Le Roy resigned after leading the team to the qualifying round of the World Cup in 2018.

On 6 April 2016, Le Roy was named as the new coach of the Togo national team, replacing Tom Saintfiet. He resigned on 12 April 2021 having failed to lead the side to the African Cup of Nations.

== Awards ==
On 24 August 2018, Liberian president George Weah decorated Arsène Wenger and Le Roy with the insignia of Knight Grand Commander of the Humane Order of African Redemption.

== Honours ==
=== As a manager ===
Cameroon

- African Cup of Nations: 1988; runner-up, 1986
- Afro-Asian Cup of Nations: 1985

Oman

- Arabian Gulf Cup: 2009

Orders

- Knight Grand Commander of the Humane Order of African Redemption: 2018
