= Jorge Eduardo Romero =

Argentine football referee

Jorge Eduardo Romero is a retired football referee from Argentina. He is known for having refereed matches at the FIFA World Youth Championship, the 1984 Summer Olympics and many more international matches in South American competitions.
