= Tonho Gil =

Brazilian footballer

Personal information
- Full name: Antônio José Gil
- Date of birth: 18 August 1957 (age 69)
- Place of birth: Criciúma (SC), Brazil
- Position: Midfielder

Senior career*
Years	Team	Apps	(Gls)
1976–1981	Internacional		
1981	Operário		
1981–1983	Grêmio		
1984	Aimoré		
1985	Avaí		
1986	Inter de Limeira		
1987–1989	São José		
1989–1991	Ponte Preta		
1991	Avaí		

International career
1984	Brazil U23		

Managerial career
- 1992: São José-RS
- 1994: Grêmio U17
- 1994: Grêmio U20
- 2000: CRB
- 2000–2001: Inter de Lages
- 2003: Grêmio U20
- 2003: Lages
- 2003–2004: Atlético de Ibirama
- 2005: Grêmio (assistant)
- 2005: Marcílio Dias
- 2005–2006: Atlético de Ibirama
- 2007: Marcílio Dias
- 2007: Brusque
- 2008–2009: Ypiranga de Erechim
- 2009–2010: Santa Cruz-RS
- 2010: São José
- 2010–2011: Brasil de Farroupilha
- 2011: São Paulo-RS
- 2012: Glória
- 2013: Santa Cruz-RS
Medal record
Men's Football
Representing Brazil
Silver medal – second place	1984 Los Angeles	Team
- * Club domestic league appearances and goals

Antônio "Tonho" José Gil (born 18 August 1957) is a Brazilian former footballer who played as a midfielder. He competed in the 1984 Summer Olympics with the Brazil national under-23 football team.

== Personal life ==
Tonho is brother of Almir and Sérgio Gil.

== Honours ==
=== Player ===
Grêmio

- Copa Libertadores: 1983
- Intercontinental Cup: 1983

=== Manager ===
Inter de Lages

- Campeonato Catarinense Série B: 2000

Ypiranga de Erechim

- Campeonato Gaúcho Série B: 2008
- Campeonato Gaúcho do Interior: 2009
