= Charles Toubé =

Cameroonian footballer (1958-2016)

Personal information
- Full name: Charles Toubé
- Date of birth: 22 January 1958
- Place of birth: Yaoundé, French Cameroon
- Date of death: 4 August 2016 (aged 58)
- Place of death: Douala, Cameroon
- Position: Midfielder

Senior career*
Years	Team	Apps	(Gls)
1977–1982	Tonnerre Yaoundé	?	(?)

International career
1978–1985	Cameroon	9	(0)
Medal record
Men's football
Representing Cameroon
Africa Cup of Nations
Winner	1984 Ivory Coast
Afro-Asian Cup of Nations
Winner	1985 Cameroon
- * Club domestic league appearances and goals

Charles Toubé (22 January 1958 – 4 August 2016) was a Cameroonian professional footballer. He competed for the Cameroon national football team at the 1982 FIFA World Cup as a winger.

== Honours ==
Cameroon

- African Cup of Nations: 1984
- Afro-Asian Cup of Nations: 1985

== See also ==
- 1982 FIFA World Cup squads
