= Hamid Janina =

Moroccan footballer

Personal information
- Date of birth: 29 August 1958 (age 68)

International career
Years	Team	Apps	(Gls)
- Morocco

Hamid Janina (born 29 August 1958) is a Moroccan footballer. He competed in the men's tournament at the 1984 Summer Olympics.
