= Driss Mouttaqui =

Moroccan footballer

Personal information
- Date of birth: 1 September 1956 (age 70)
- Position: Midfielder

International career
Years	Team	Apps	(Gls)
- Morocco

Driss Mouttaqui (born 1 September 1956) is a Moroccan footballer. He competed in the men's tournament at the 1984 Summer Olympics.
