= Khalid El-Bied =

Moroccan footballer (born 1955)

Personal information
- Date of birth: 24 August 1955 (age 71)

International career
Years	Team	Apps	(Gls)
1977-1986	Morocco	43	(7)

Khalid El-Bied (born 24 August 1955) is a Moroccan footballer. He competed in the men's tournament at the 1984 Summer Olympics.
