= Chassignolles, Indre =

Chassignolles
- Commune
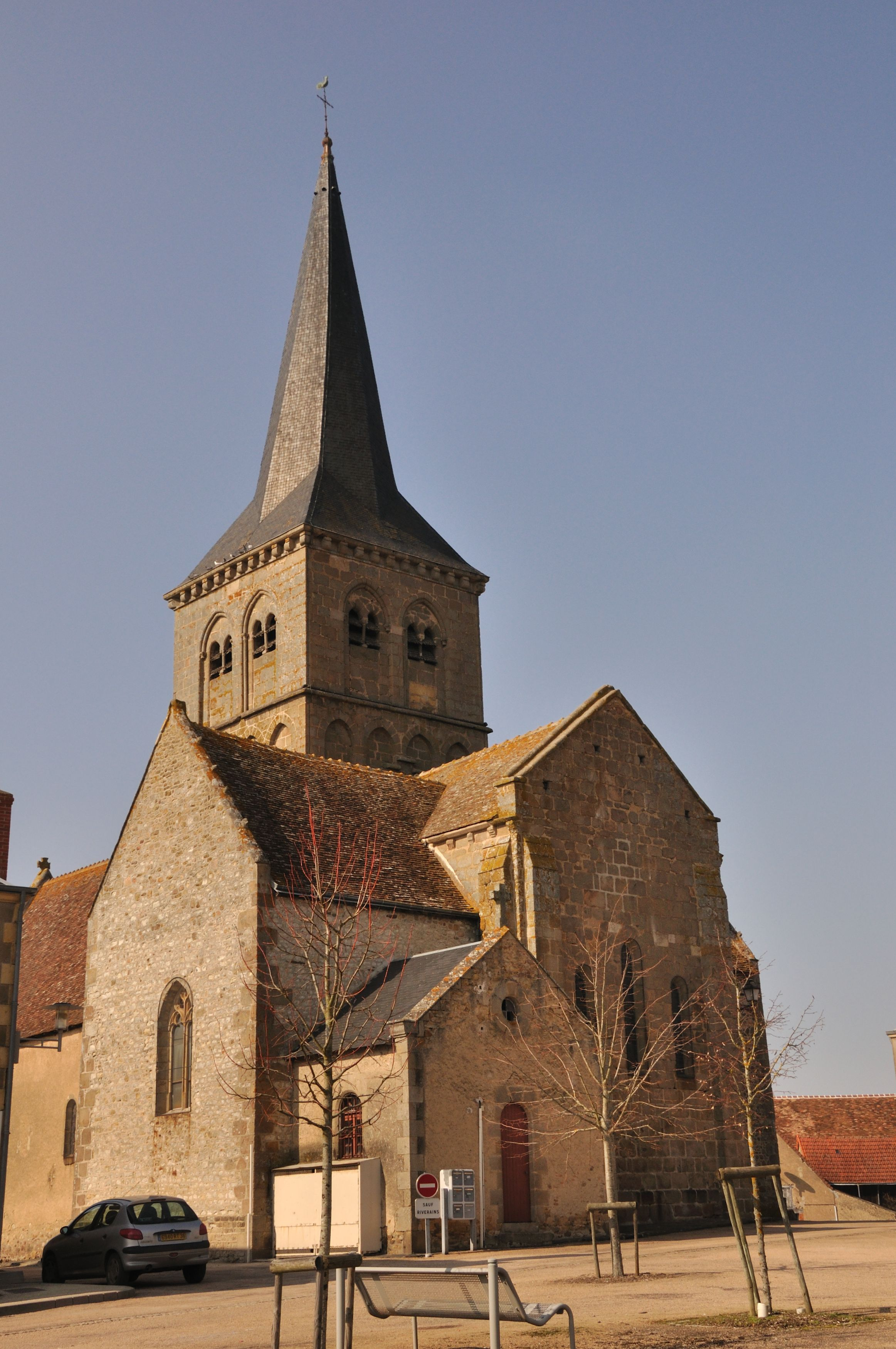
- The Church of Saint-Étienne, in Chassignolles
- Location of Chassignolles
- Location within France Location within Centre-Val de Loire
- Coordinates: 46°32′28″N 1°56′26″E
- Country: France
- Region: Centre-Val de Loire
- Department: Indre
- Arrondissement: La Châtre
- Canton: Neuvy-Saint-Sépulchre
- Intercommunality: La Châtre et Sainte-Sévère

Government
  - Mayor (2020–2026): Élisabeth Labesse
- Area^{1}: 29.94 km^{2} (11.56 sq mi)
- Elevation: 283 m (928 ft)
- Highest elevation: 376 m (1,234 ft)
- Lowest elevation: 204 m (669 ft)
- Population (2023): 529
  - Density: 17.7/km^{2} (45.8/sq mi)
- Time zone: UTC+01:00 (CET)
  - Summer (DST): UTC+02:00 (CEST)
- INSEE/Postal code: 36043 /36400
- ^{1} French Land Register data, which excludes lakes, ponds, glaciers > 1 km^{2} (0.386 sq mi or 247 acres) and river estuaries.

Chassignolles (French pronunciation: [ʃasiɲɔl]) is a commune in the Indre department in central France.

== Population ==
Historical population
Year	Pop.	±% p.a.
1968	826	—
1975	680	−2.74%
1982	567	−2.56%
1990	548	−0.43%
1999	543	−0.10%
2007	568	+0.56%
2012	598	+1.03%
2017	568	−1.02%
2023	529	−1.18%
Source: INSEE

== See also ==
- Communes of the Indre department
