= Khalid Gadallah =

Egyptian footballer (born 1955)

Personal information
- Date of birth: 1955 (age 70–71)
- Position: Defender

International career
Years	Team	Apps	(Gls)
- Egypt

Khalid Gadallah (born 1955) is an Egyptian former footballer. He competed in the men's tournament at the 1984 Summer Olympics.
