= Émile Mbouh =

Cameroonian footballer

Personal information
- Full name: Émile Belmont Mbouh Mbouh
- Date of birth: 30 May 1966 (age 60)
- Place of birth: Douala, Cameroon
- Height: 1.66 m (5 ft 5 1/2 in)
- Position: Midfielder

Senior career*
Years	Team	Apps	(Gls)
1984–1985	Union Douala		
1986–1988	Diamant Yaoundé		
1988–1989	Le Havre	11	(0)
1989–1990	Chênois	9	(0)
1990–1991	Vitória de Guimarães	14	(1)
1991–1992	Benfica e Castelo Branco	20	(1)
1992–1993	Ettifaq		
1993–1994	Qatar SC		
1995–1996	Perlis FA		
1997	Tiong Bahru United		
1997	Kuala Lumpur FA	8	(0)
1998	Liaoning Tianrun		
1999–2001	Sabah FA		

International career
1985–1994	Cameroon	68	(3)
Medal record
Men's football
Representing Cameroon
Africa Cup of Nations
Winner	1988 Morocco
Runner-up	1986 Egypt
Afro-Asian Cup of Nations
Winner	1985 Cameroon
- * Club domestic league appearances and goals

Émile Belmont Mbouh Mbouh (born 30 May 1966) is a Cameroonian former footballer who played at both professional and international levels as a midfielder.

== Club career ==
Born in Douala, Mbouh played club football for Union Douala, Diamant Yaoundé, Le Havre, Chênois, Vitória de Guimarães, Benfica e Castelo Branco, Ettifaq, Qatar SC, Perlis FA, Tiong Bahru United, Kuala Lumpur FA, Liaoning Tianrun and Sabah FA.

== International career ==
Mbouh was a member of the Cameroon between 1985 and 1994, he earned 46 caps and scored 2 goals. He also appeared at the both 1990 and 1994 FIFA World Cup.

== Honours ==
Cameroon

- African Cup of Nations: 1988; runner-up, 1986
- Afro-Asian Cup of Nations: 1985
