= Dagobert Dang =

Cameroonian footballer (born 1958)

Personal information
- Date of birth: 6 February 1958 (age 68)
- Place of birth: Sackbayémé, Cameroon
- Position: Forward

Senior career*
Years	Team	Apps	(Gls)
?–?	Prévoyance de Yaoundé		
?–?	Canon Yaoundé		

International career
1984	Cameroon U23	2	(0)
1984–1991	Cameroon		
Medal record
Men's football
Representing Cameroon
Africa Cup of Nations
Winner	1984 Ivory Coast
Runner-up	1986 Egypt
Afro-Asian Cup of Nations
Winner	1985 Cameroon
- * Club domestic league appearances and goals

Dagobert Dang (born 6 February 1958) is a former Cameroon international football forward.

== Career ==
Born in Cameroon, Dang played club football for local sides Prévoyance de Yaoundé and Canon Yaoundé.

Dang represented Cameroon at the 1984 Summer Olympics in Boston. He also made several appearances for the senior Cameroon national football team, including one FIFA World Cup qualifying match, and played at the 1984 and 1986 African Cup of Nations finals.

== Personal ==
Dang's son, Arnaud Seumen, is also a professional footballer.

== Honours ==
Cameroon

- African Cup of Nations: 1984; runner-up, 1986
- Afro-Asian Cup of Nations: 1985
