= Mohammed Fadel (footballer) =

Iraqi footballer

Personal information
- Date of birth: 27 October 1963 (age 63)
- Position: Defender

Senior career*
Years	Team	Apps	(Gls)
- Al Shorta

International career
1984-1985	Iraq		
- * Club domestic league appearances and goals

Mohammed Fadel (Arabic: مُحَمَّد فَاضِل; born 27 October 1963) is an Iraqi footballer. He competed in the men's tournament at the 1984 Summer Olympics. Fadel played for Iraq in 1984.
