= Hussein Al-Bishi =

Saudi Arabian footballer (born 1961)

Personal information
- Date of birth: 13 June 1961 (age 65)
- Place of birth: Saudi Arabia
- Position: Defender

Senior career*
Years	Team	Apps	(Gls)
1973–1975	Al-Nakheel		
1975–1992	Al-Hilal		

International career
1980–1989	Saudi Arabia	53	(0)
- * Club domestic league appearances and goals

Hussein Al-Bishi (born 13 June 1961) is a Saudi former footballer who played as a defender. He played for Saudi Arabia in the 1984 Asian Cup.

Al-Bishi played club football for Al-Nakheel before joining Al Hilal SFC where he was a key figure in the center of the club's defense during the 1980s and 1990s, famously scoring a goal in the 1989 King Cup final as Al Hilal won 3–0 against Al Nassr FC.
