= Paul Bahoken =

Cameroonian footballer (born 1955)

Personal information
- Date of birth: 7 July 1955 (age 71)
- Place of birth: Douala, Cameroon
- Height: 1.76 m (5 ft 9 in)
- Position: Forward

Senior career*
Years	Team	Apps	(Gls)
1975–1977	Tonnerre Yaoundé		
1977–1978	Reims B		
1978–1979	Troyes	14	(3)
1979–1982	Cannes	69	(15)
1982–1983	Valenciennes	11	(1)
1983–1985	Olympique Alès	6	(0)
1986	Stade Raphaëlois	10	(3)

International career
1977–1984	Cameroon	9	(4)
- * Club domestic league appearances and goals

Paul Bahoken (born 7 July 1955) is a Cameroonian former professional footballer who played as a forward. He competed for the Cameroon national team at the 1982 FIFA World Cup. At club level he played in France for Troyes AC, AS Cannes, Valenciennes, Olympique Alès, and Stade Raphaëlois.

== Personal life ==
Bahoken's son, Stéphane Bahoken, is also a professional footballer and international for the Cameroon national team.
