= Ahmad Al-Bishi =

Saudi Arabian footballer (born 1962)

Personal information
- Date of birth: 2 September 1962 (age 64)
- Position: Defender

International career
Years	Team	Apps	(Gls)
- Saudi Arabia

Ahmad Al-Bishi (born 2 September 1962) is a Saudi Arabian footballer. He competed in the men's tournament at the 1984 Summer Olympics.
