= Sameer Abdulshaker =

Arabian footballer

Personal information
- Date of birth: 12 May 1960 (age 66)
- Place of birth: Medina, Saudi Arabia
- Position: Defender

Senior career*
Years	Team	Apps	(Gls)
- Ohod Club
- Al-Wehda

International career
1982–1986	Saudi Arabia	27	(2)
- * Club domestic league appearances and goals

Sameer Abdulshaker (born 12 May 1960) is a Saudi footballer who played as a defender for Saudi Arabia in the 1984 AFC Asian Cup.
