= Football at the 1984 Summer Olympics =

1984 Olympic Football Tournament

Tournament details
- Host country: United States
- Dates: July 29 – August 11, 1984
- Teams: 16 (from 5 confederations)
- Venues: 4 (in 4 host cities)

Final positions
- Champions: France (1st title)
- Runners-up: Brazil
- Third place: Yugoslavia
- Fourth place: Italy

Tournament statistics
- Matches played: 32
- Goals scored: 84 (2.63 per match)
- Attendance: 1,425,181 (44,537 per match)
- Top scorer(s): (Socialist Federal Republic of Yugoslavia) Borislav Cvetković (Socialist Federal Republic of Yugoslavia) Stjepan Deverić (France) Daniel Xuereb (5 goals each)

The association football (soccer) tournament at the 1984 Summer Olympics started on July 29 and ended on August 11, taking place throughout the United States. It was the first Olympic soccer competition in which officially professional players were allowed. Until then, the amateur-only rule had heavily favored Soviet Bloc states from Eastern Europe whose players were professionals in all but name. However, as agreed with FIFA to preserve the importance of the World Cup, the Olympic competition was restricted to players with no more than five "A" caps at tournament start, regardless of age. Specifically, they allowed teams from countries outside of UEFA and CONMEBOL to field their strongest sides, while restricting UEFA and CONMEBOL (the strongest confederations whose teams had played all finals and won every single World Cup title) countries to players who had not played in a World Cup.

The soccer tournament was held in four venues:

- Harvard Stadium (Boston)
- Navy–Marine Corps Memorial Stadium (Annapolis, Maryland)
- Stanford Stadium (Stanford, California)
- Rose Bowl (Pasadena, California)

The Gold medal game between France and Brazil at the Rose Bowl attracted an Olympic Games soccer attendance record of 101,799. This remained the record attendance for a soccer game in the United States until 2014, breaking the previous Olympic record attendance of 100,000 set at the Melbourne Cricket Ground in Australia for the game of the 1956 Olympic Games played between the Soviet Union and Yugoslavia. The Rose Bowl attendance would remain the Olympic record until 104,098 attended the game of the 2000 Summer Olympics between Cameroon and Spain at the Stadium Australia in Sydney.

The attendance also stood as the highest for a soccer game in the United States until 109,318 saw Manchester United defeat Real Madrid during the 2014 International Champions Cup at the Michigan Stadium in Ann Arbor.

== Schedule ==
G	Group stage	¼	Quarterfinals	½	Semifinals	B	3rd place play-off	F	Final

Event↓/Date →	Sun 29	Mon 30	Tue 31	Wed 1	Thu 2	Fri 3	Sat 4	Sun 5	Mon 6	Tue 7	Wed 8	Thu 9	Fri 10	Sat 11
Men's tournament	G	G	G	G	G	G		¼	¼		½		B	F

== Qualifying ==
Sixteen teams qualified for the Olympic tournament after continental qualifying rounds. Three Warsaw Pact countries had qualified but withdrew as part of the Soviet-led boycott. They were replaced as follows:

- East Germany were replaced by Norway.
- USSR were replaced by West Germany.
- Czechoslovakia were replaced by Italy.

- Africa (CAF)
  - Cameroon
  - Egypt
  - Morocco
- Asia (AFC)
  - Iraq
  - Saudi Arabia
  - Qatar
- North and Central America (CONCACAF)
  - Canada
  - Costa Rica

- South America (CONMEBOL)
  - Brazil
  - Chile
- Europe (UEFA)
  - France
  - Italy (replaces Czechoslovakia)
  - Norway (replaces East Germany)
  - West Germany (replaces Soviet Union)
  - Yugoslavia
- Hosting nation
  - United States

== Venues ==
Pasadena	Boston	Annapolis	Stanford
Rose Bowl	Harvard Stadium	Navy–Marine Corps Stadium	Stanford Stadium
Capacity: 103,300	Capacity: 30,323	Capacity: 34,000	Capacity: 84,500
Football at the 1984 Summer Olympics is located in the United States

== Medalists ==
Gold Medal – France

William Ayache
Michel Bensoussan
Michel Bibard
Dominique Bijotat
François Brisson
Patrick Cubaynes
Patrice Garande
Philippe Jeannol
Guy Lacombe
Jean-Claude Lemoult
Jean-Philippe Rohr
Albert Rust
Didier Sénac
Jean-Christophe Thouvenel
José Touré
Daniel Xuereb
Jean-Louis Zanon
Coach: Henri Michel

Silver Medal – Brazil

Pinga
Davi
Milton Cruz
Luís Henrique Dias
André Luís
Mauro Galvão
Tonho
Kita
Gilmar Popoca
Silvinho
Gilmar
Ademir
Paulo Santos
Ronaldo Silva
Dunga
Chicão
Luiz Carlos Winck
Coach: Jair Picerni

Bronze Medal – Yugoslavia

Mirsad Baljić
Mehmed Baždarević
Vlado Čapljić
Borislav Cvetković
Stjepan Deverić
Milko Đurovski
Marko Elsner
Nenad Gračan
Tomislav Ivković
Srečko Katanec
Branko Miljuš
Mitar Mrkela
Jovica Nikolić
Ivan Pudar
Ljubomir Radanović
Admir Smajić
Dragan Stojković
Coach: Ivan Toplak

== Match officials ==
Africa

- (Egypt) Mohamed Hossameldin
- (Ethiopia) Gebreyesus Tesfaye
- (Malawi) Bester Kalombo

Asia

- (Kuwait) Abdul Aziz Al-Salmi
- (South Korea) Kyung-Bok Cha
- (Japan) Toshikazu Sano

North and Central America

- (Canada) Tony Evangelista
- (Mexico) Antonio Márquez Ramírez
- (Costa Rica) Luis Paulino Siles
- (United States) David Socha
- (United States) Edward Bellion

South America

- (Brazil) Romualdo Arppi Filho
- (Chile) Gastón Castro
- (Colombia) Jesús Díaz
- (Argentina) Jorge Eduardo Romero

Europe

- (Italy) Enzo Barbaresco
- (Romania) Ioan Igna
- (Netherlands) Jan Keizer
- (United Kingdom) Brian McGinlay
- (France) Joël Quiniou
- (West Germany) Volker Roth
- (Spain) Victoriano Sánchez Arminio
- (Socialist Federal Republic of Yugoslavia) Edvard Šoštarič

== Final tournament ==
=== Group stage ===
==== Group A ====
Pos	Team	Pld	W	D	L	GF	GA	GD	Pts	Qualification
1	France	3	1	2	0	5	4	+1	4	Qualified for quarter-finals
2	Chile	3	1	2	0	2	1	+1	4	Qualified for quarter-finals
3	Norway	3	1	1	1	3	2	+1	3	
4	Qatar	3	0	1	2	2	5	−3	1	

Source: FIFA
July 29, 1984
19:30

Norway	0–0	Chile
	Report

Harvard Stadium, Boston
Attendance: 25,000
Referee: Socha (USA)
July 29, 1984
19:30

France	2–2	Qatar
Garande 43'; Xuereb 61'	Report	Al-Muhannadi 55', 60'

Navy–Marine Corps Memorial Stadium, Annapolis
Attendance: 29,240
Referee: Filho (BRA)

July 31, 1984
19:00

Norway	1–2	France
Ahlsen 33'	Report	Brisson 5', 56'

Harvard Stadium, Boston
Attendance: 27,832
Referee: Roth (FRG)
July 31, 1984
19:00

Chile	1–0	Qatar
Baeza 52'	Report

Navy–Marine Corps Memorial Stadium, Annapolis
Attendance: 14,508
Referee: Siles (CRC)

August 2, 1984
19:00

Qatar	0–2	Norway
	Report	Vaadal 21', 52'

Harvard Stadium, Boston
Attendance: 17,529
Referee: Kalombo (MWI)
August 2, 1984
19:00

Chile	1–1	France
Santis 9'	Report	Lemoult 50'

Navy–Marine Corps Memorial Stadium, Annapolis
Attendance: 28,114
Referee: Keizer (NED)

==== Group B ====
Pos	Team	Pld	W	D	L	GF	GA	GD	Pts	Qualification
1	Yugoslavia	3	3	0	0	7	3	+4	6	Qualified for quarter-finals
2	Canada	3	1	1	1	4	3	+1	3	Qualified for quarter-finals
3	Cameroon	3	1	0	2	3	5	−2	2	
4	Iraq	3	0	1	2	3	6	−3	1	

Source: FIFA
July 30, 1984
19:30

Canada	1–1	Iraq
Gray 70'	Report	Saeed 83'

Harvard Stadium, Boston
Attendance: 16,730
Referee: Díaz (COL)
July 30, 1984
19:00

Yugoslavia	2–1	Cameroon
Nikolić 39'; Cvetković 70'	Report	Milla 32'

Navy–Marine Corps Memorial Stadium, Annapolis
Attendance: 15,010
Referee: Keizer (NED)

August 1, 1984
19:00

Cameroon	1–0	Iraq
Bahoken 7'	Report

Harvard Stadium, Boston
Attendance: 20,000
Referee: Socha (USA)
August 1, 1984
19:00

Yugoslavia	1–0	Canada
Nikolić 76'	Report

Navy–Marine Corps Memorial Stadium, Annapolis
Attendance: 20,000
Referee: Hossameldin (EGY)

August 3, 1984
19:00

Cameroon	1–3	Canada
Mfédé 76'	Report	Mitchell 43', 82'; Vrablic 72'

Harvard Stadium, Boston
Attendance: 27,621
Referee: Barbaresco (ITA)
August 3, 1984
19:00

Iraq	2–4	Yugoslavia
Saeed 17'; Shihab 43'	Report	Deverić 55', 76', 87'; Nikolić 86'

Navy–Marine Corps Memorial Stadium, Annapolis
Attendance: 24,430
Referee: Sano (JPN)

==== Group C ====
Pos	Team	Pld	W	D	L	GF	GA	GD	Pts	Qualification
1	Brazil	3	3	0	0	6	1	+5	6	Qualified for quarter-finals
2	West Germany	3	2	0	1	8	1	+7	4	Qualified for quarter-finals
3	Morocco	3	1	0	2	1	4	−3	2	
4	Saudi Arabia	3	0	0	3	1	10	−9	0	

Source: FIFA
July 30, 1984
19:30

West Germany	2–0	Morocco
Rahn 43'; Brehme 52'	Report

Stanford Stadium, Stanford
Attendance: 23.228
Referee: Evangelista (CAN)
July 30, 1984
19:00

Brazil	3–1	Saudi Arabia
Gilmar Popoca 12'; Silvinho 50'; Dunga 59'	Report	Abdullah 69'

Rose Bowl, Pasadena
Attendance: 40,799
Referee: McGinlay (GBR)

August 1, 1984
19:00

Brazil	1–0	West Germany
Gilmar Popoca 86'	Report

Stanford Stadium, Stanford
Attendance: 75,239
Referee: Cha (KOR)
August 1, 1984
19:00

Morocco	1–0	Saudi Arabia
Merry 72'	Report

Rose Bowl, Pasadena
Attendance: 36,909
Referee: Šoštarič (YUG)

August 3, 1984
19:00

Saudi Arabia	0–6	West Germany
	Report	Schreier 8', 66'; Bommer 22', 72'; Rahn 24'; Mill 32'

Stanford Stadium, Stanford
Attendance: 26,242
Referee: Igna (ROU)
August 3, 1984
19:00

Morocco	0–2	Brazil
	Report	Dunga 64'; Kita 70'

Rose Bowl, Pasadena
Attendance: 49,355
Referee: Sánchez (ESP)

==== Group D ====
Pos	Team	Pld	W	D	L	GF	GA	GD	Pts	Qualification
1	Italy	3	2	0	1	2	1	+1	4	Qualified for quarter-finals
2	Egypt	3	1	1	1	5	3	+2	3	Qualified for quarter-finals
3	United States	3	1	1	1	4	2	+2	3	
4	Costa Rica	3	1	0	2	2	7	−5	2	

Source: FIFA
July 29, 1984
19:30

United States	3–0	Costa Rica
Davis 23', 86'; Willrich 35'	Report

Stanford Stadium, Stanford
Attendance: 78,000
Referee: Quiniou (FRA)
July 29, 1984
19:30

Italy	1–0	Egypt
Serena 63'	Report

Rose Bowl, Pasadena
Attendance: 37,430
Referee: Castro (CHI)

July 31, 1984
19:00

Egypt	4–1	Costa Rica
Khatib 32'; Abdelghani 35'; Soliman 62'; Gadallah 71'	Report	Coronado 87'

Stanford Stadium, Stanford
Attendance: 20,645
Referee: Ramírez (MEX)
July 31, 1984
19:00

Italy	1–0	United States
Fanna 58'	Report

Rose Bowl, Pasadena
Attendance: 63.624
Referee: Al-Salmi (KUW)

August 2, 1984
19:00

Egypt	1–1	United States
Soliman 27'	Report	Thompson 8'

Stanford Stadium, Stanford
Attendance: 54,973
Referee: Romero (ARG)
August 2, 1984
19:00

Costa Rica	1–0	Italy
Rivers 33'	Report

Rose Bowl, Pasadena
Attendance: 41,291
Referee: Tesfaye (ETH)

=== Knockout stage ===
Quarter-finals
August 5 – Pasadena, CA
France	2
Egypt	0
August 6 – Pasadena, CA
Yugoslavia	5
West Germany	2
August 5 – Stanford, CA
Italy (a.e.t.)	1
Chile	0
August 6 – Stanford, CA
Brazil (pen.)	1 (4)
Canada	1 (2)

Semi-finals
August 8 – Pasadena, CA
France (a.e.t.)	4
Yugoslavia	2
August 8 – Stanford, CA
Italy	1
Brazil (a.e.t.)	2

Final
August 11 – Pasadena, CA
France	2
Brazil	0
Bronze medal match
August 10 – Pasadena, CA
Yugoslavia	2
Italy	1

==== Quarter-finals ====
August 5, 1984
15:00

Italy	1–0 (a.e.t.)	Chile
Vignola 95'	Report

Stanford Stadium, Stanford
Attendance: 67,349
Referee: McGinlay (GBR)

August 5, 1984
19:00

France	2–0	Egypt
Xuereb 29', 52'	Report

Rose Bowl, Pasadena
Attendance: 66,228
Referee: Cha (KOR)

August 6, 1984
17:00

Brazil	1–1 (a.e.t.)	Canada
Gilmar Popoca 72'	Report	Mitchell 58'
Penalties
Gilmar (penalty scored); Kita (penalty scored); Ademir (penalty scored); André Luiz (penalty scored)	4–2	(penalty scored) Wilson; (penalty missed) Mitchell; (penalty missed) Bridge; (penalty scored) Gray

Stanford Stadium, Stanford
Attendance: 36,150
Referee: Siles (CRC)

August 6, 1984
19:00

Yugoslavia	5–2	West Germany
Cvetković 21', 58', 70'; Radanović 27'; Gračan 46' (pen.)	Report	Bommer 1'; Bockenfeld 28'

Rose Bowl, Pasadena
Attendance: 58,439
Referee: Romero (ARG)

==== Semi-finals ====
August 8, 1984
18:15

France	4–2 (a.e.t.)	Yugoslavia
Bijotat 7'; Jeannol 15'; Lacombe 96'; Xuereb 119'	Report	Cvetković 63'; Deverić 74'

Rose Bowl, Pasadena
Attendance: 97,451
Referee: Ramírez (MEX)

August 8, 1984
20:30

Italy	1–2 (a.e.t.)	Brazil
Fanna 62'	Report	Gilmar Popoca 53'; Ronaldo 95'

Stanford Stadium, Stanford
Attendance: 83,642
Referee: Socha (USA)

==== Bronze Medal match ====
August 10, 1984
19:00

Yugoslavia	2–1	Italy
Baljić 59'; Deverić 81'	Report	Vignola 27' (pen.)

Rose Bowl, Pasadena
Attendance: 100,374
Referee: McGinlay (GBR)

==== Gold Medal match ====
August 11, 1984
19:00

France	2–0	Brazil
Brisson 55'; Xuereb 60'	Report

Rose Bowl, Pasadena
Attendance: 101,799
Referee: Keizer (Netherlands)

France	Brazil

GK	1	Albert Rust
DF	2	William Ayache
DF	4	Michel Bibard
DF	8	Philippe Jeannol
DF	16	Jean-Louis Zanon
MF	10	Jean-Claude Lemoult
MF	11	Jean-Philippe Rohr
MF	9	Guy Lacombe
FW	4	Dominique Bijotat
FW	15	Daniel Xuereb	Substituted off
FW	5	François Brisson	Substituted off
Substitutions:
FW	7	Patrice Garande	Substituted on
FW	6	Patrick Cubaynes	Substituted on
Manager:
(France) Henri Michel

GK	1	Gilmar Rinaldi
DF	2	Ronaldo Silva
DF	3	Pinga
DF	4	Mauro Galvão
DF	6	André Luís
MF	5	Ademir
MF	8	Dunga
MF	10	Gilmar Popoca
FW	15	Tonho	Substituted off
FW	9	Kita	Substituted off
FW	11	Silvinho
Substitutions:
FW	16	Chicão	Substituted on
FW	17	Milton Cruz	Substituted on
Manager:
(Brazil) Jair Picerni

Match rules

- 90 minutes.
- 30 minutes of extra time if necessary.
- Penalty shoot-out if scores still level.
- Maximum of two substitutions.

== Final team rankings ==
Note: As per statistical convention in football, matches decided in extra time are counted as wins and losses, while matches decided by penalty shoot-outs are counted as draws.

Pos	Team	Pld	W	D	L	GF	GA	GD	Pts	Result
1	France	6	4	2	0	13	6	+7	10	
2	Brazil	6	4	1	1	9	5	+4	9	
3	Yugoslavia	6	5	0	1	16	10	+6	10	
4	Italy	6	3	0	3	5	5	0	6	
5	West Germany	4	2	0	2	10	6	+4	4	Eliminated in the quarter-finals
6	Canada	4	1	2	1	5	4	+1	4	Eliminated in the quarter-finals
7	Chile	4	1	2	1	2	2	0	4	Eliminated in the quarter-finals
8	Egypt	4	1	1	2	5	5	0	3	Eliminated in the quarter-finals
9	United States	3	1	1	1	4	2	+2	3	Eliminated in the group stage
10	Norway	3	1	1	1	3	2	+1	3	Eliminated in the group stage
11	Cameroon	3	1	0	2	3	5	−2	2	Eliminated in the group stage
12	Morocco	3	1	0	2	1	4	−3	2	Eliminated in the group stage
13	Costa Rica	3	1	0	2	2	7	−5	2	Eliminated in the group stage
14	Iraq	3	0	1	2	3	6	−3	1	Eliminated in the group stage
15	Qatar	3	0	1	2	2	5	−3	1	Eliminated in the group stage
16	Saudi Arabia	3	0	0	3	1	10	−9	0	Eliminated in the group stage

== Statistics ==
=== Goalscorers ===
With five goals, Daniel Xuereb of France, Borislav Cvetković and Stjepan Deverić of Yugoslavia are the top scorers in the tournament. In total, 84 goals were scored by 52 different players, with none of them credited as own goal.

5 goals

- (France) Daniel Xuereb
- (Socialist Federal Republic of Yugoslavia) Borislav Cvetković
- (Socialist Federal Republic of Yugoslavia) Stjepan Deverić

4 goals

- (Brazil) Gilmar Popoca

3 goals

- (Canada) Dale Mitchell
- (France) François Brisson
- (West Germany) Rudi Bommer
- (West Germany) Uwe Rahn
- (Socialist Federal Republic of Yugoslavia) Jovica Nikolić

2 goals

- (Brazil) Dunga
- (Egypt) Emad Soliman
- (Italy) Pietro Fanna
- (Italy) Beniamino Vignola
- (Iraq) Hussein Saeed
- (Norway) Joar Vaadal
- (Qatar) Khalid Al-Muhannadi
- (United States) Rick Davis
- (West Germany) Christian Schreier

1 goal

- (Brazil) Kita
- (Brazil) Ronaldo Silva
- (Brazil) Silvio Paiva
- (Cameroon) Paul Bahoken
- (Cameroon) Louis-Paul Mfédé
- (Cameroon) Roger Milla
- (Canada) Gerry Gray
- (Canada) Igor Vrablic
- (Chile) Jaime Baeza
- (Chile) Fernando Santis
- (Costa Rica) Evaristo Coronado
- (Costa Rica) Enrique Rivers
- (Egypt) Magdi Abdelghani
- (Egypt) Mahmoud El Khatib
- (Egypt) Khaled Gadallah
- (France) Dominique Bijotat
- (France) Patrice Garande
- (France) Philippe Jeannol
- (France) Guy Lacombe
- (France) Jean-Claude Lemoult
- (Iraq) Ali Hussein Shihab
- (Italy) Aldo Serena
- (Morocco) Mustapha Merry
- (Norway) Per Egil Ahlsen
- (Saudi Arabia) Majed Abdullah
- (United States) Gregg Thompson
- (United States) Jean Willrich
- (West Germany) Manfred Bockenfeld
- (West Germany) Andreas Brehme
- (West Germany) Frank Mill
- (Socialist Federal Republic of Yugoslavia) Mirsad Baljić
- (Socialist Federal Republic of Yugoslavia) Nenad Gračan
- (Socialist Federal Republic of Yugoslavia) Ljubomir Radanović

=== Discipline ===
In the final tournament, a player was suspended for the subsequent match in the competition for getting a red card. The following twelve players were sent off and suspended during the final tournament:

Player	Offences	Date	Suspensions
(Italy) Sebastiano Nela	(red card) in group D v Egypt	July 29	Group D v United States
(Egypt) Mohamed Sedky	(yellow card) (yellow-red card) in group D v Italy	July 29	Group D v Costa Rica
(Egypt) Morsy El Alaa	(yellow card) (yellow-red card) in group D v Italy	July 29	Group D v Costa Rica
(Egypt) Moustafa Ahmed Ismail	(yellow card) (yellow-red card) in group D v Italy	July 29	Group D v Costa Rica
(Socialist Federal Republic of Yugoslavia) Marko Elsner	(yellow card) (yellow-red card) in group B v Cameroon	July 30	Group B v Canada
(Morocco) Mustapha El Biyaz	(yellow card) (yellow-red card) in group C v West Germany	July 30	Group C v Saudi Arabia
(Qatar) Mubarak Al-Kaater	(yellow card) (yellow-red card) in group A v Norway	August 2	None (Qatar eliminated)
(Qatar) Issa Al-Mohammadi	(red card) in group A v Norway	August 2	None (Qatar eliminated)
(Cameroon) Théophile Abega	(yellow card) (yellow-red card) in group B v Canada	August 3	None (Cameroon eliminated)
(Saudi Arabia) Sameer Abdulshaker	(yellow card) (yellow-red card) in group C v West Germany	August 3	None (Saudi Arabia eliminated)
(Socialist Federal Republic of Yugoslavia) Jovica Nikolić	(red card) in semi-final v France	August 8	Bronze medal match v Italy
(Socialist Federal Republic of Yugoslavia) Borislav Cvetković	(red card) in semi-final v France	August 8	Bronze medal match v Italy

== Trivia ==
The wave was first broadcast internationally during the 1984 Olympic football final, when it was done among the 100,000 in attendance at the Rose Bowl, Pasadena.
