= 1982 FIFA World Cup Group 5 =

Football tournament group stage

Group 5 was one of six groups of national teams competing in the group stage of the 1982 FIFA World Cup. Play began on 16 June and ended on 25 June 1982. The group consisted of four teams: Seeded team and host nation Spain, World Cup debutants Honduras, Yugoslavia and Northern Ireland.

== Standings ==
Pos	Team	Pld	W	D	L	GF	GA	GD	Pts	Qualification
1	Northern Ireland	3	1	2	0	2	1	+1	4	Advance to second round
2	Spain (H)	3	1	1	1	3	3	0	3	Advance to second round
3	Yugoslavia	3	1	1	1	2	2	0	3	
4	Honduras	3	0	2	1	2	3	−1	2	

Source: FIFA
(H) Hosts

== Matches ==
=== Spain vs Honduras ===
16 June 1982
21:00 CEST

Spain	1–1	Honduras
López Ufarte 65' (pen.)		Zelaya 8'

Estadio Luis Casanova, Valencia
Attendance: 49,562
Referee: Arturo Ithurralde (Argentina)

Spain	Honduras

GK	1	Luis Arconada (c)
SW	6	José Ramón Alexanko
DF	2	José Antonio Camacho
DF	5	Miguel Tendillo
DF	3	Rafael Gordillo
MF	4	Periko Alonso
MF	10	Jesús María Zamora
MF	8	Joaquín	(substituted off) 46'
FW	7	Juanito	(substituted off) 46'
FW	9	Jesús María Satrústegui
FW	11	Roberto López Ufarte
Substitutes:
GK	21	Urruti
DF	12	Santiago Urquiaga
MF	15	Enrique Saura	(substituted on) 46'
MF	16	Tente Sánchez	(substituted on) 46'
FW	20	Quini
Manager:
José Santamaría

GK	21	Julio César Arzú
SW	5	Allan Anthony Costly
DF	2	Efraín Gutiérrez
DF	3	Jaime Villegas
DF	4	Fernando Bulnes
MF	20	Gilberto Yearwood
MF	6	Ramón Maradiaga (c)
MF	15	Héctor Zelaya
FW	13	Prudencio Norales	(substituted off) 69'
FW	9	Armando Betancourt
FW	10	Macho Figueroa
Substitutes:
GK	1	Salomón Nazar
MF	8	Francisco Javier Toledo
MF	14	Juan Cruz Murillo
DF	17	José Cruz
MF	18	Carlos Orlando Caballero	(substituted on) 69'
Manager:
Chelato Uclés

Assistant referees:
Bogdan Dochev (Bulgaria)
Luis Barrancos (Bolivia)

=== Yugoslavia vs Northern Ireland ===
17 June 1982
21:00 CEST

Yugoslavia	0–0	Northern Ireland

La Romareda, Zaragoza
Attendance: 25,000
Referee: Erik Fredriksson (Sweden)

Yugoslavia	Northern Ireland

GK	1	Dragan Pantelić
SW	4	Velimir Zajec
DF	15	Miloš Hrstić
DF	14	Nikola Jovanović
DF	5	Nenad Stojković
MF	8	Edhem Šljivo
MF	3	Ivan Gudelj
MF	20	Ivica Šurjak (c)
MF	7	Vladimir Petrović
FW	11	Zlatko Vujović
FW	13	Safet Sušić
Substitutes:
GK	22	Ratko Svilar
DF	2	Ive Jerolimov
MF	16	Miloš Šestić
MF	17	Jurica Jerković
FW	19	Vahid Halilhodžić
Manager:
Miljan Miljanić

GK	1	Pat Jennings
DF	2	Jimmy Nicholl
DF	5	Chris Nicholl
DF	12	John McClelland
DF	3	Mal Donaghy
MF	8	Martin O'Neill (c)
MF	10	Sammy McIlroy
MF	4	David McCreery
FW	16	Norman Whiteside	(yellow card) 62'
FW	9	Gerry Armstrong
FW	11	Billy Hamilton
Substitutes:
GK	17	Jim Platt
DF	6	John O'Neill
MF	7	Noel Brotherston
FW	19	Felix Healy
MF	20	Jim Cleary
Manager:
Billy Bingham

Assistant referees:
Bruno Galler (Switzerland)
Károly Palotai (Hungary)

=== Spain vs Yugoslavia ===
This was the fourth time that Yugoslavia lost to the host nation of tournament, after Uruguay in 1930, Chile in 1962 and West Germany in 1974.

20 June 1982
21:00 CEST

Spain	2–1	Yugoslavia
Juanito 14' (pen.); Saura 66'		Gudelj 10'

Estadio Luis Casanova, Valencia
Attendance: 48,000
Referee: Henning Lund-Sørensen (Denmark)

Spain	Yugoslavia

GK	1	Luis Arconada (c)
SW	6	José Ramón Alexanko
DF	2	José Antonio Camacho
DF	5	Miguel Tendillo
DF	3	Rafael Gordillo	(yellow card) 87'
MF	4	Periko Alonso
MF	16	Tente Sánchez		(substituted off) 63'
MF	10	Jesús María Zamora	(yellow card) 80'
FW	7	Juanito
FW	9	Jesús María Satrústegui		(substituted off) 63'
FW	11	Roberto López Ufarte
Substitutes:
GK	21	Urruti
DF	12	Santiago Urquiaga
MF	15	Enrique Saura		(substituted on) 63'
FW	19	Santillana
FW	20	Quini		(substituted on) 63'
Manager:
José Santamaría

GK	1	Dragan Pantelić
SW	4	Velimir Zajec
DF	6	Zlatko Krmpotić
DF	14	Nikola Jovanović		(substituted off) 74'
DF	5	Nenad Stojković	(yellow card) 35'
MF	3	Ivan Gudelj
MF	7	Vladimir Petrović
MF	8	Edhem Šljivo	(yellow card) 78'
MF	20	Ivica Šurjak (c)
FW	11	Zlatko Vujović		(substituted off) 83'
FW	13	Safet Sušić
Substitutes:
GK	22	Ratko Svilar
DF	9	Zoran Vujović
MF	16	Miloš Šestić		(substituted on) 83'
MF	17	Jurica Jerković
FW	19	Vahid Halilhodžić		(substituted on) 74'
Manager:
Miljan Miljanić

Assistant referees:
António Garrido (Portugal)
Arturo Ithurralde (Argentina)

=== Honduras vs Northern Ireland ===
21 June 1982
21:00 CEST

Honduras	1–1	Northern Ireland
Laing 60'		Armstrong 10'

La Romareda, Zaragoza
Attendance: 15,000
Referee: Chan Tam Sun (Hong Kong)

Honduras	Northern Ireland

GK	21	Julio César Arzú
SW	5	Allan Anthony Costly
DF	2	Efraín Gutiérrez
DF	3	Jaime Villegas
DF	17	José Cruz
MF	6	Ramón Maradiaga (c)
MF	20	Gilberto Yearwood
MF	15	Héctor Zelaya
MF	10	Macho Figueroa
FW	13	Prudencio Norales	(substituted off) 58'
FW	9	Armando Betancourt
Substitutes:
GK	1	Salomón Nazar
FW	7	Eduardo Laing	(substituted on) 58'
MF	8	Francisco Javier Toledo
MF	11	David Bueso
MF	18	Carlos Orlando Caballero
Manager:
Chelato Uclés

GK	1	Pat Jennings
DF	2	Jimmy Nicholl
DF	3	Mal Donaghy
DF	5	Chris Nicholl
DF	12	John McClelland
MF	4	David McCreery
MF	8	Martin O'Neill (c)	(substituted off) 78'
MF	9	Gerry Armstrong
MF	10	Sammy McIlroy
FW	11	Billy Hamilton
FW	16	Norman Whiteside	(substituted off) 66'
Substitutes:
DF	6	John O'Neill
MF	7	Noel Brotherston	(substituted on) 66'
DF	13	Sammy Nelson
MF	14	Tommy Cassidy
FW	19	Felix Healy	(substituted on) 78'
Manager:
Billy Bingham

Assistant referees:
Enrique Labo Revoredo (Peru)
Paolo Casarin (Italy)

=== Honduras vs Yugoslavia ===
24 June 1982
21:00 CEST

Honduras	0–1	Yugoslavia
		Petrović 88' (pen.)

La Romareda, Zaragoza
Attendance: 25,000
Referee: Gastón Castro (Chile)

Honduras	Yugoslavia

GK	21	Julio César Arzú
SW	5	Allan Anthony Costly
DF	12	Domingo Drummond
DF	3	Jaime Villegas
DF	4	Fernando Bulnes
MF	15	Héctor Zelaya
MF	20	Gilberto Yearwood	(red card) 89'
MF	6	Ramón Maradiaga (c)	(yellow card) 85'
MF	14	Juan Cruz Murillo		(substituted off) 65'
FW	9	Armando Betancourt
FW	10	Macho Figueroa
Substitutes:
GK	1	Salomón Nazar
FW	7	Eduardo Laing		(substituted on) 65'
MF	8	Francisco Javier Toledo
DF	17	José Cruz
MF	18	Carlos Orlando Caballero
Manager:
Chelato Uclés

GK	1	Dragan Pantelić
SW	4	Velimir Zajec
DF	6	Zlatko Krmpotić	(yellow card) 81'
DF	14	Nikola Jovanović		(substituted off) 46'
DF	5	Nenad Stojković
MF	8	Edhem Šljivo
MF	3	Ivan Gudelj
MF	20	Ivica Šurjak (c)
MF	7	Vladimir Petrović
FW	11	Zlatko Vujović		(substituted off) 62'
FW	13	Safet Sušić
Substitutes:
GK	22	Ratko Svilar
DF	2	Ive Jerolimov
MF	16	Miloš Šestić		(substituted on) 62'
MF	17	Jurica Jerković
FW	19	Vahid Halilhodžić		(substituted on) 46'
Manager:
Miljan Miljanić

Assistant referees:
Luis Paulino Siles (Costa Rica)
Arturo Ithurralde (Argentina)

=== Spain vs Northern Ireland ===
25 June 1982
21:00 CEST

Spain	0–1	Northern Ireland
		Armstrong 47'

Estadio Luis Casanova, Valencia
Attendance: 49,562
Referee: Héctor Ortiz (Paraguay)

Spain	Northern Ireland

GK	1	Luis Arconada (c)
SW	6	José Ramón Alexanko
DF	2	José Antonio Camacho
DF	5	Miguel Tendillo
DF	3	Rafael Gordillo
MF	4	Periko Alonso
MF	16	Tente Sánchez
MF	15	Enrique Saura
FW	7	Juanito	(yellow card) 20'
FW	9	Jesús María Satrústegui		(substituted off) 46'
FW	11	Roberto López Ufarte		(substituted off) 78'
Substitutes:
GK	21	Urruti
DF	12	Santiago Urquiaga
DF	14	Antonio Maceda
MF	17	Ricardo Gallego		(substituted on) 78'
FW	20	Quini		(substituted on) 46'
Manager:
José Santamaría

GK	1	Pat Jennings
SW	2	Jimmy Nicholl
DF	5	Chris Nicholl
DF	12	John McClelland
DF	3	Mal Donaghy (red card) 60'
MF	8	Martin O'Neill (c)
MF	10	Sammy McIlroy	(yellow card) 42'	(substituted off) 50'
MF	4	David McCreery
MF	9	Gerry Armstrong
FW	16	Norman Whiteside		(substituted off) 73'
FW	11	Billy Hamilton	(yellow card) 41'
Substitutes:
GK	22	George Dunlop
DF	13	Sammy Nelson		(substituted on) 73'
MF	14	Tommy Cassidy		(substituted on) 50'
MF	15	Tommy Finney
FW	19	Felix Healy
Manager:
Billy Bingham

Assistant referees:
Enrique Labo Revoredo (Peru)
Alexis Ponnet (Belgium)

== See also ==
- Honduras at the FIFA World Cup
- Northern Ireland at the FIFA World Cup
- Spain at the FIFA World Cup
- Yugoslavia at the FIFA World Cup
