= 1982 FIFA World Cup Group C =

Football tournament group stage

Group C was one of four groups of national teams competing in the second stage of the 1982 FIFA World Cup. The group's three matches were staged at the Estadio Sarriá in Barcelona. The group consisted of three teams advancing from the first group stage: Group 1 runners-up Italy, Group 6 winners Brazil and the Group 3 runners-up, the reigning world champions Argentina.

Italy topped the group and advanced to the semi-finals, eventually winning the competition.

In 2007, The Guardian called this group the deadliest-ever Group of Death in FIFA World Cup history.

== Qualified teams ==
The winner of Group 6 and the runners-up of Group 1 and 3 qualified for Group C of the second round.

Group	Winners
6	Brazil
Group	Runners-up
1	Italy
3	Argentina

== Standings ==
Pos	Team	Pld	W	D	L	GF	GA	GD	Pts	Qualification
1	Italy	2	2	0	0	5	3	+2	4	Advance to knockout stage
2	Brazil	2	1	0	1	5	4	+1	2	
3	Argentina	2	0	0	2	2	5	−3	0	

Source: FIFA

== Matches ==
=== Italy vs Argentina ===
29 June 1982
17:15 CEST

Italy	2–1	Argentina
Tardelli 57'; Cabrini 67'		Passarella 83'

Sarrià Stadium, Barcelona
Attendance: 43,000
Referee: Nicolae Rainea (Romania)

Italy	Argentina

GK	1	Dino Zoff (c)
SW	7	Gaetano Scirea
DF	6	Claudio Gentile	(yellow card) 43'
DF	5	Fulvio Collovati
DF	4	Antonio Cabrini
MF	13	Gabriele Oriali		(substituted off) 75'
MF	9	Giancarlo Antognoni
MF	14	Marco Tardelli
FW	16	Bruno Conti
FW	20	Paolo Rossi	(yellow card) 15'	(substituted off) 80'
FW	19	Francesco Graziani
Substitutes:
GK	12	Ivano Bordon
DF	3	Giuseppe Bergomi
MF	11	Gianpiero Marini		(substituted on) 75'
MF	15	Franco Causio
FW	18	Alessandro Altobelli		(substituted on) 80'
Manager:
Enzo Bearzot

GK	7	Ubaldo Fillol
SW	15	Daniel Passarella (c)
DF	14	Jorge Olguín
DF	8	Luis Galván
DF	18	Alberto Tarantini
MF	1	Osvaldo Ardiles	(yellow card) 39'
MF	9	Américo Gallego	(red card) 84'
MF	10	Diego Maradona	(yellow card) 35'
MF	11	Mario Kempes	(yellow card) 32'	(substituted off) 58'
FW	4	Daniel Bertoni
FW	6	Ramón Díaz		(substituted off) 58'
Substitutes:
GK	2	Héctor Baley
MF	3	Juan Barbas
MF	5	Gabriel Calderón		(substituted on) 58'
FW	20	Jorge Valdano
MF	21	José Daniel Valencia		(substituted on) 58'
Manager:
César Luis Menotti

Assistant referees:
Bruno Galler (Switzerland)
Belaïd Lacarne (Algeria)

=== Argentina vs Brazil ===
2 July 1982
17:15 CEST

Argentina	1–3	Brazil
Díaz 89'		Zico 11'; Serginho 66'; Júnior 75'

Sarrià Stadium, Barcelona
Attendance: 44,000
Referee: Mario Rubio Vázquez (Mexico)

Argentina	Brazil

GK	7	Ubaldo Fillol
SW	15	Daniel Passarella (c)	(yellow card) 33'
DF	14	Jorge Olguín
DF	8	Luis Galván
DF	18	Alberto Tarantini
MF	1	Osvaldo Ardiles
MF	3	Juan Barbas
MF	11	Mario Kempes		(substituted off) 46'
MF	5	Gabriel Calderón
MF	10	Diego Maradona	(red card) 85'
FW	4	Daniel Bertoni		(substituted off) 64'
Substitutes:
GK	2	Héctor Baley
FW	6	Ramón Díaz		(substituted on) 46'
DF	13	Julio Olarticoechea
FW	17	Santiago Santamaría		(substituted on) 64'
DF	19	Enzo Trossero
Manager:
César Luis Menotti

GK	1	Waldir Peres	(yellow card) 77'
RB	2	Leandro		(substituted off) 82'
CB	3	Oscar
CB	4	Luizinho
LB	6	Júnior
DM	5	Toninho Cerezo
DM	15	Falcão	(yellow card) 85'
AM	8	Sócrates (c)
AM	10	Zico		(substituted off) 83'
RF	9	Serginho
LF	11	Éder
Substitutes:
GK	12	Paulo Sérgio
FW	7	Paulo Isidoro
DF	13	Edevaldo		(substituted on) 82'
DF	16	Edinho
MF	18	Batista		(substituted on) 83'
Manager:
Telê Santana

Assistant referees:
Gilberto Aristizábal (Colombia)
Gastón Castro (Chile)

=== Italy vs Brazil ===
5 July 1982
17:15 CEST

Italy	3–2	Brazil
Rossi 5', 25', 74'		Sócrates 12'; Falcão 68'

Sarrià Stadium, Barcelona
Attendance: 44,000
Referee: Abraham Klein (Israel)

Italy	Brazil

GK	1	Dino Zoff (c)
DF	4	Antonio Cabrini
DF	5	Fulvio Collovati		(substituted off) 34'
DF	6	Claudio Gentile	(yellow card) 13'
DF	7	Gaetano Scirea
MF	9	Giancarlo Antognoni
MF	13	Gabriele Oriali	(yellow card) 78'
MF	14	Marco Tardelli		(substituted off) 75'
MF	16	Bruno Conti
CF	19	Francesco Graziani
CF	20	Paolo Rossi
Substitutes:
GK	12	Ivano Bordon
DF	3	Giuseppe Bergomi		(substituted on) 34'
MF	11	Gianpiero Marini		(substituted on) 75'
MF	15	Franco Causio
FW	18	Alessandro Altobelli
Manager:
Enzo Bearzot

GK	1	Waldir Peres
RB	2	Leandro
CB	3	Oscar
CB	4	Luizinho
LB	6	Júnior
CM	5	Toninho Cerezo
CM	8	Sócrates (c)
LM	11	Éder
RM	15	Falcão
SS	10	Zico
CF	9	Serginho	(substituted off) 69'
Substitutes:
GK	12	Paulo Sérgio
DF	13	Edevaldo
DF	14	Juninho
MF	7	Paulo Isidoro	(substituted on) 69'
FW	19	Renato
Manager:
Telê Santana

Assistant referees:
Chan Tam Sun (Hong Kong)
Bogdan Dochev (Bulgaria)

== See also ==
- Argentina at the FIFA World Cup
- Brazil at the FIFA World Cup
- Italy at the FIFA World Cup
