= Italy v Brazil (1982 FIFA World Cup) =

1982 FIFA World Cup Group C
Sarrià Tragedy (Tragédia do Sarrià)
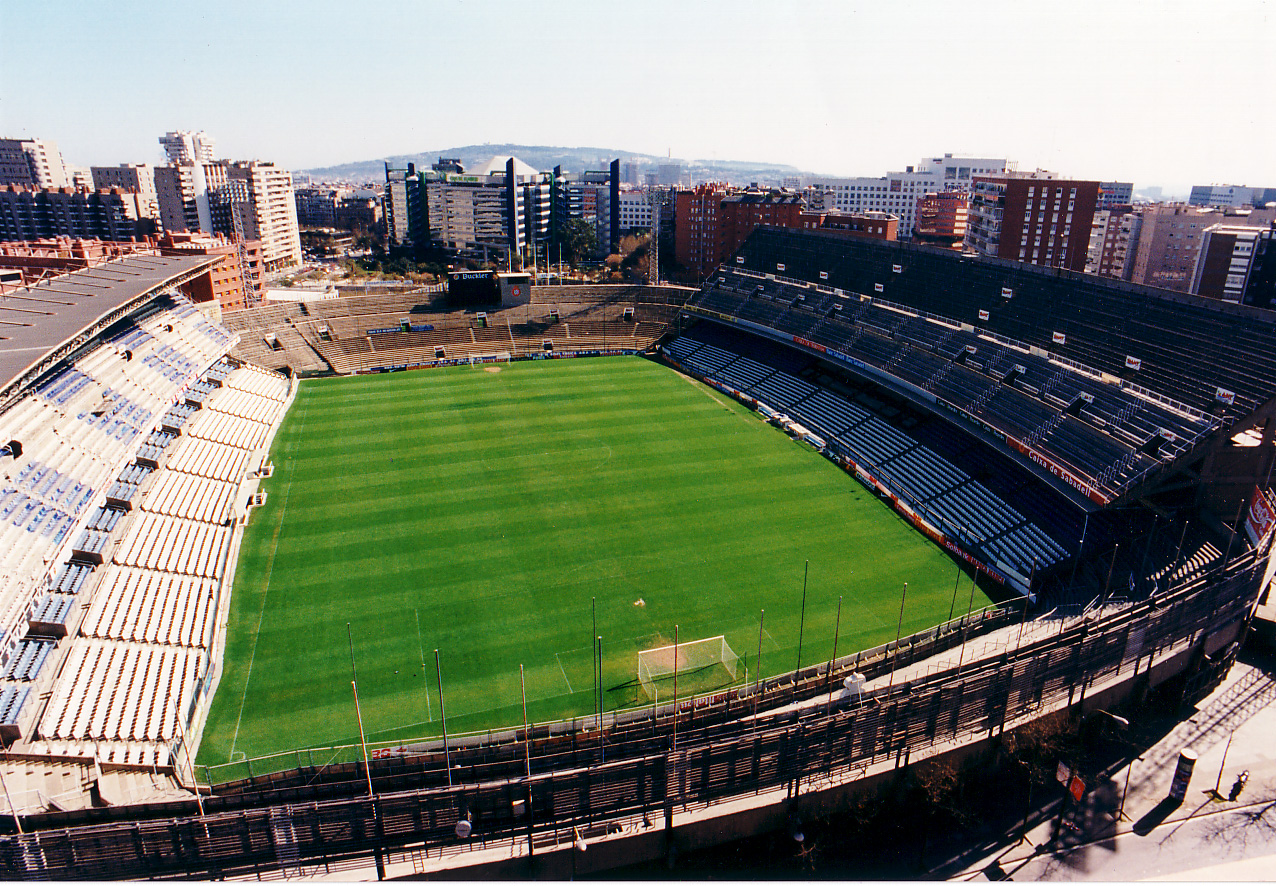
- The Estadi de Sarrià held the match
- Event: 1982 FIFA World Cup
Italy	Brazil
(Italy)	(Brazil)
3	2
- Date: 5 July 1982
- Venue: Estadio Sarriá, Barcelona
- Referee: Abraham Klein (Israel)
- Attendance: 44,000

Italy v Brazil was a football match that took place between Brazil and Italy at Estadio Sarriá, Barcelona on 5 July 1982. It was the final second round group stage match for Group C in the 1982 FIFA World Cup. The match was won by Italy 3–2, with Italian striker Paolo Rossi scoring a hat-trick. The result eliminated Brazil from the tournament while Italy would go on to win it. The match has been described as one of the greatest in the history of association football.

== Pre-match ==
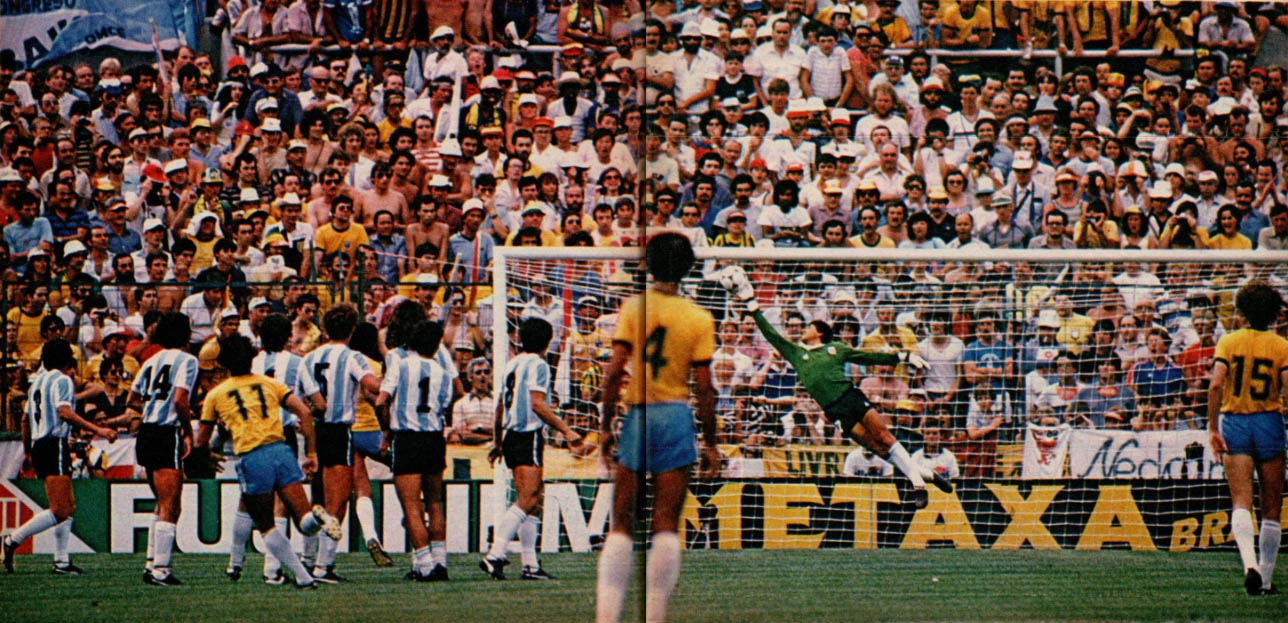
Prior to this match, Brazil had won all of their games. In the image, the victory over Argentina

Brazil had won all three of their first group stage matches, including comprehensive wins over Scotland (4–1) and New Zealand (4–0), and were the pre-tournament favourites. They were widely praised for their attacking style. In their initial second group stage match, Brazil beat South American rivals and World Cup holders Argentina 3–1.

Italy, meanwhile, had a slow start to the tournament, having drawn all three of their first group stage matches and finishing runners-up in their group; they had only qualified for the second group stage by having scored one more goal than third-placed Cameroon, who also finished with three draws. However, in the first of their second-round matches, Italy recorded an impressive 2–1 victory over Argentina.

Rossi had failed to score up to that point and there was considerable debate about whether he should be in the team, as he had only recently returned from a two-year ban following his involvement in the Totonero 1980 match-fixing scandal (his banning was initially ruled to last for three years, but was reduced on appeal). Italy were forced to play for a win to reach the semi-final, due to their inferior goal difference.

== Match ==
=== Summary ===
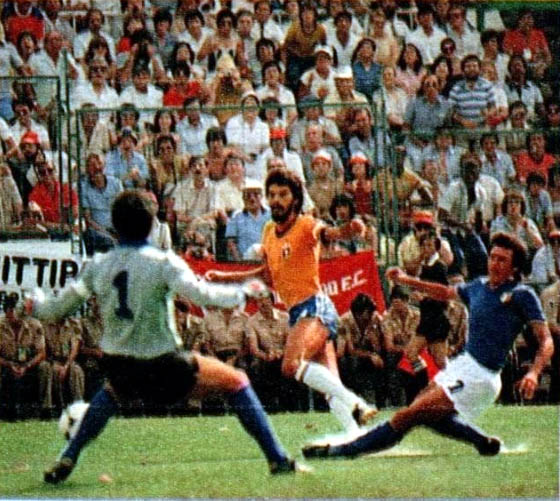
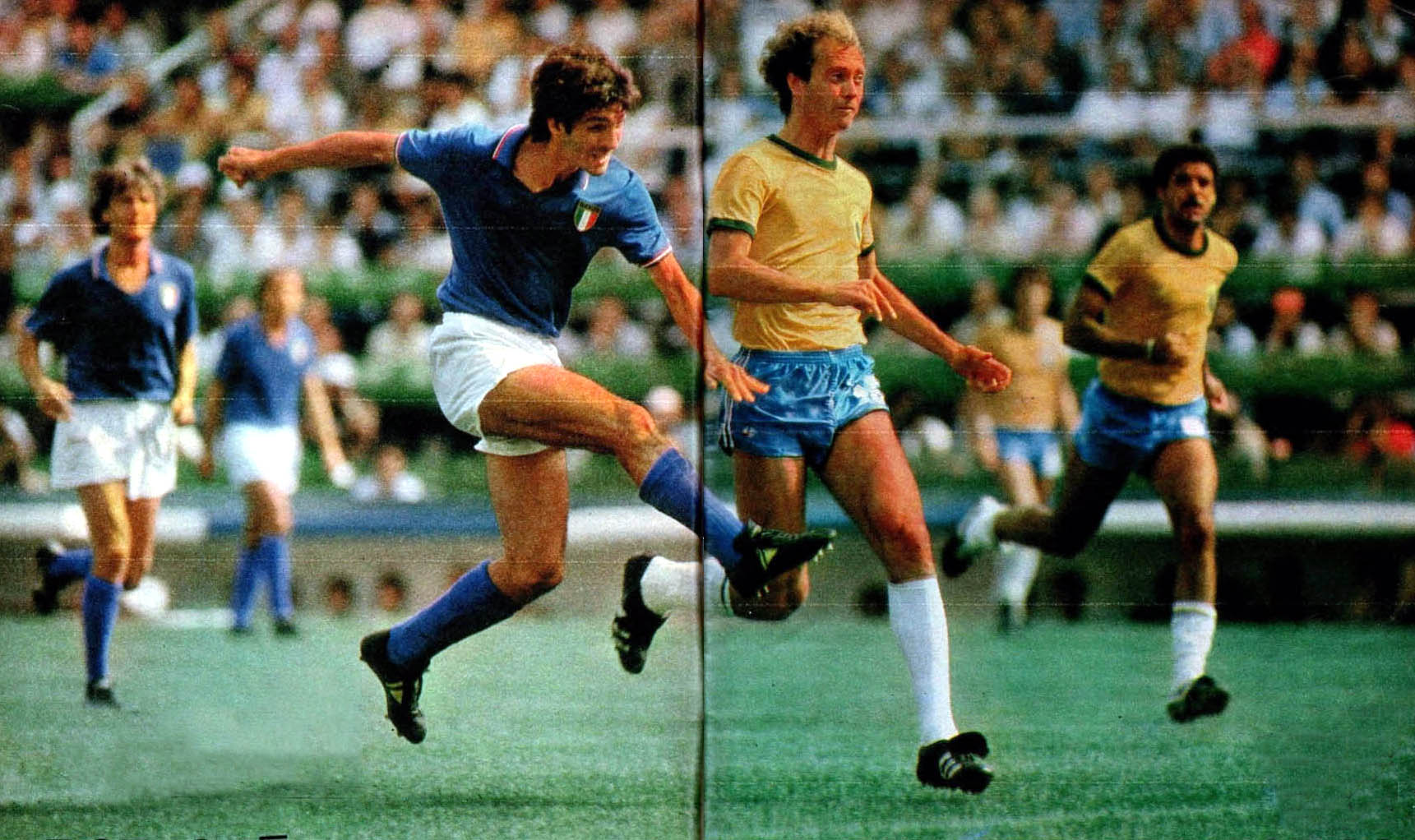
Sócrates (left image) and Paolo Rossi (right) scoring for Brazil and Italy, respectively

The match put Brazil's attack against Italy's defence, with the majority of the game played around the Italian area, with the Italian midfielders and defenders returning the repeated set volleys of Brazilian shooters such as Zico, Sócrates and Falcão. Italian centre back Claudio Gentile was assigned to mark Brazilian attacking midfielder Zico, earning a yellow card and a suspension for the semi-final.

Paolo Rossi opened the scoring when he headed in Antonio Cabrini's cross with just five minutes played. Sócrates equalised for Brazil seven minutes later. In the twenty-fifth minute Rossi stepped past Júnior, intercepted a pass from Cerezo across the Brazilians' goal, and drilled the shot home. The Brazilians threw everything in search of another equaliser, while Italy defended bravely. On 68 minutes, Falcão collected a pass from Júnior and as Cerezo's dummy run distracted three defenders, fired home from 20 yards out. Now Italy had gained the lead twice thanks to Rossi's goals, and Brazil had come back twice.

At 2–2, Brazil would have been through on goal difference, but in the 74th minute, a poor clearance from an Italian corner kick went back to the Brazilian six-yard line where Rossi and Francesco Graziani were waiting. Both aimed at the same shot, with Rossi connecting to score a hat-trick and send Italy into the lead for good. In the 86th minute, Giancarlo Antognoni scored a fourth goal for Italy, but it was wrongly disallowed for offside. In the dying moments Dino Zoff made a miraculous save to deny Oscar a goal, ensuring that Italy advanced to the semi-final where they would meet Poland.

=== Details ===
5 July 1982
17:15 CEST

Italy	3–2	Brazil
Rossi 5', 25', 74'		Sócrates 12'; Falcão 68'

Sarrià Stadium, Barcelona
Attendance: 44,000
Referee: Abraham Klein (Israel)

Italy	Brazil

GK	1	Dino Zoff (c)
DF	4	Antonio Cabrini
DF	5	Fulvio Collovati		(substituted off) 34'
DF	6	Claudio Gentile	(yellow card) 13'
DF	7	Gaetano Scirea
MF	9	Giancarlo Antognoni
MF	13	Gabriele Oriali	(yellow card) 78'
MF	14	Marco Tardelli		(substituted off) 75'
MF	16	Bruno Conti
CF	19	Francesco Graziani
CF	20	Paolo Rossi
Substitutes:
GK	12	Ivano Bordon
DF	3	Giuseppe Bergomi		(substituted on) 34'
MF	11	Gianpiero Marini		(substituted on) 75'
MF	15	Franco Causio
FW	18	Alessandro Altobelli
Manager:
Enzo Bearzot

GK	1	Waldir Peres
RB	2	Leandro
CB	3	Oscar
CB	4	Luizinho
LB	6	Júnior
CM	5	Toninho Cerezo
CM	8	Sócrates (c)
LM	11	Éder
RM	15	Falcão
SS	10	Zico
CF	9	Serginho	(substituted off) 69'
Substitutes:
GK	12	Paulo Sérgio
MF	7	Paulo Isidoro	(substituted on) 69'
DF	13	Edevaldo
DF	14	Juninho
MF	19	Renato
Manager:
Telê Santana

Assistant referees:
Chan Tam Sun (Hong Kong)
Bogdan Dochev (Bulgaria)

Match rules

- 90 minutes.
- Five named substitutes.
- Maximum of two substitutions.

== Impact ==
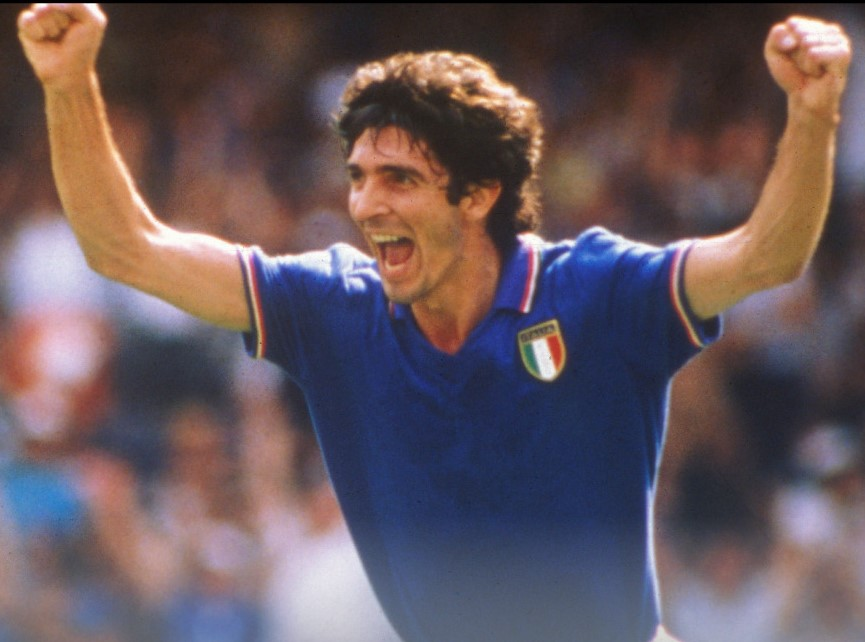
Italian striker Paolo Rossi was the man-of-the-match, having scored three goals

The result was seen by many as not only a defeat for Brazil, but a defeat of their attacking philosophy by the more organised Italians. This match has since then been labelled by the Brazilian press as the "Sarrià Tragedy" (Portuguese: Tragédia do Sarrià). The result of the match had a profound and lasting impact on Brazilian football and fundamentally changed its philosophy. According to Luizinho, Brazil's centre back in 1982, the defeat changed Brazilian coaches' way of thinking, leading to a new, destructive philosophy based on more tactical, physical, defensive, and counterattacking football, possessing similarities with the style of football played by the Italians against the Brazilians.

As described by sports journalist Tim Vickery: "For many Brazilian coaches, the failure of that 1982 side to win the World Cup (...) served as proof for ideas that had been kicking around for a while – starting with a 5–1 massacre at the hands of Belgium in 1963, confirmed by the defeat by Holland in the 1974 World Cup. The physical development of the game, it was thought, meant that traditional methods had to be revised. Brazilian players had to bulk up – Rubens Minelli, the most successful domestic coach of the 70s, wanted his team to be made up of six footers. And with less space on the field, the future of football lay in the counter attack, rather than elaborate attempts to pass through midfield." Tim Vickery continues by stating that "these thoughts have carried a lot of weight in the Brazilian game. They help explain why a succession of Brazil sides have caught the eye for explosive breaks down the flanks rather than for the succession of midfield triangles that enraptured Cappa and everyone else in 1982. When former Middlesbrough left-back Branco was in charge of Brazil’s youth sides, he told me that right from the start of the process the search for big, strong youngsters was a priority. Brazilian coaches, meanwhile, became fond of spouting the statistic that the chances of a goal are reduced if the move contains more than seven passes." He also earlier stated in 2006 that "had Brazil won the trophy in 1982 the team would be more than a fond memory. They might be the blueprint for future sides, because winners are always copied." When describing the events of the match, Sócrates later recounted: "We had a hell of a team and played with happiness. Then Rossi had three touches and scored a hat-trick. Football as we know it died on that day."

Further success in 1994 and 2002 in mostly pragmatic, less flashy styles cemented the new philosophy and practically buried the traditional passing style further into the past.

The rise of tiki-taka, a style of football partly based on moving triangles, positional interchange and intricate passing – highly reminiscent of the old Brazilian passing style, embodied by the 1982 team – has helped recover some of the prestige of the 1982 team in the country. The crushing defeat of the Brazilian counterattacking style by tiki-taka teams, namely the 4–0 defeat of Santos to Barcelona and the 7–1 Brazilian defeat to Germany at home at the World Cup in 2014 laid bare how Brazilian football had been left behind. As a result, the country's football philosophy has been slowly returning to the old intricate passing style in the last few years, as recent success by Grêmio and Flamengo have shown.

== See also ==
- Brazil–Italy football rivalry
- Brazil at the FIFA World Cup
- Italy at the FIFA World Cup
