= Ravizza =

Ravizza is an Italian surname. Notable people with this surname include:

- Francesco Ravizza (1616–1675), Italian archbishop and diplomat
- Giuliano Ravizza (1926–1992), Italian fashion designer
- Giuseppe Ravizza (1811–1885), Italian inventor
- Matilde Ravizza (born 1971), Italian runner
