= Juan Cruz Murillo =

Honduran football midfielder (born 1959)

Personal information
- Full name: Juan Alberto Cruz Murillo
- Date of birth: 24 June 1959 (age 67)
- Place of birth: Honduras
- Position: Midfielder

Senior career*
Years	Team	Apps	(Gls)
1982	Pumas UNAH		
1987	Olimpia		

International career
- Honduras
- * Club domestic league appearances and goals

Juan Alberto Cruz Murillo (born 24 June 1959) is a Honduran football midfielder who played for Honduras in the 1982 FIFA World Cup.

== Club career ==
He also played for Pumas UNAH and Olimpia for whom he played in the 1987 CONCACAF Champions' Cup.

== International career ==
Cruz represented Honduras in 2 FIFA World Cup qualification matches and played against Yugoslavia at the 1982 FIFA World Cup.
