= Sarrià Stadium =

Former stadion in Barcelona

Estadi de Sarrià
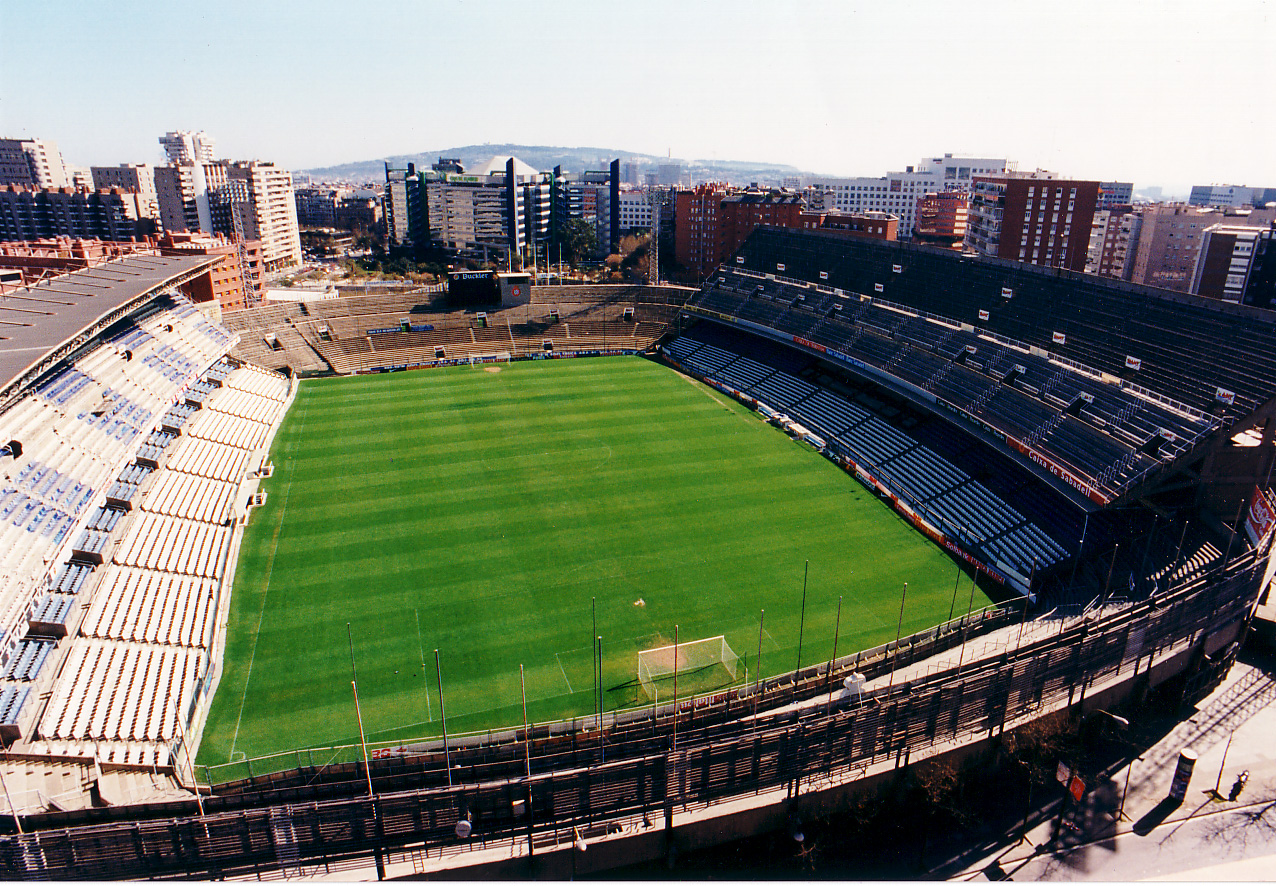
- Interactive map of Estadi de Sarrià
- Coordinates: 41°23′35″N 2°08′00″E
- Owner: Espanyol
- Operator: Espanyol
- Capacity: 44,000
- Surface: Grass
- Field size: 105 m × 70 m (344 ft × 230 ft)

Construction
- Built: 1923; 103 years ago
- Opened: 18 February 1923; 103 years ago
- Demolished: 20 September 1997; 28 years ago
- Architect: Matías Colmenares

Tenant
- Espanyol (1923–1997)

Sarrià Stadium (in Catalan: Estadi de Sarrià Catalan pronunciation: [əsˈtaði ðə səriˈa]; in Spanish: Estadio de Sarrià) was a football stadium in Barcelona, Catalonia, Spain. The stadium was the home of RCD Espanyol from 1923 to 1997, and was located in the district of Sarrià.

== Beginning ==
The stadium was named after the road in which it was constructed, which linked Barcelona and Sarrià. Construction began on 31 December 1922 under the supervision of architect Matías Colmenares, and the cost was 170,000 pesetas. The initial forecast capacity was for 40,000 spectators, but due to the bankruptcy of the construction company the initial capacity was only for 10,000 spectators.

The opening game was played on 18 February 1923 with RCD Espanyol beating UE Sants 4–1, the first goal scored by Vicenç Tonijuan. In 1929, the club won its first Cup in Spain. On 10 February, at the stadium, 'Pitus' Prats scored the first goal of the first Spanish league title. However, although the club won several Catalan Championships they had to wait until 1940 before winning their second cup in Spain.

== Successive enlargements ==
In 1948, Espanyol under club president Paco Saenz, repurchased the stadium, which until then belonged to Riva family, for 5 million pesetas.

In 1951, terracing behind the south goal was demolished, and a new grandstand was built which was overlaid in 1956. In 1960, floodlights were installed.

During the 1960s, several outstanding players such as Cayetano Re, Martial, Rodilla, Jose Maria and Peck played at the Sarrià Stadium, but especially noteworthy were Ladislao Kubala (1963–1964) and Alfredo Di Stefano (1964–1967) who finished his career there.

Manuel Meler, the president at the time, completed the southern tier raised above the new gallery, installed the lower side and reconstructed the north stand, all in twelve years.

== The 1980s and 90s ==
=== 1982 World Cup ===
The Sarrià stadium hosted three games of the 1982 FIFA World Cup, with the three matches of Group C in the second round round robin matches, with three of the favourites for the cup playing in this group: the holders Argentina, Brazil (considered the best team in the tournament), and eventual champions Italy. The key game was the third, in which Italy defeated Brazil 3–2, in a match regarded as one of the best ever and surprising played at a World Cup. The ground was full to capacity for the decisive matches. Jonathan Wilson, writing about the Brazil v Italy match in 2012, said that its "epic feel" was enhanced by the ground being packed.

Date	Team 1	Result	Team 2	Round	Attendance
29 June 1982	Italy	2–1	Argentina	Group C (second round)	43,000
2 July 1982	Argentina	1–3	Brazil	Group C (second round)	44,000
5 July 1982	Italy	3–2	Brazil	Group C (second round)	44,000

=== Other events ===
The stadium held the first leg of the 1988 UEFA Cup Final, in which Espanyol played Bayer Leverkusen.

Pink Floyd performed at the stadium during their A Momentary Lapse of Reason Tour" on 20 July 1988 and three days later George Michael performed at the stadium with his Faith World Tour.

Sting performed at the stadium during The Soul Cages Tour on 12 June 1991.

The venue hosted five football matches at the 1992 Summer Olympics.

== Demolition and sale ==
Espanyol's financial problems forced the company to sell the stadium to property developers. The last game played in Sarrià was against Valencia on 21 June 1997. Espanyol won 3–2 and the last goal was scored by visiting defender Iván Campo. The club then played at the Estadi Olímpic Lluís Companys on Montjuïc until 2009, when it moved to the Estadi Cornellà-El Prat, located between Cornellà de Llobregat and El Prat de Llobregat.
