= 1982 FIFA World Cup =

Association football tournament in Spain

Copa Mundial de Fútbol España '82 (Spanish)

Tournament details
- Host country: Spain
- Dates: 13 June – 11 July
- Teams: 24 (from 6 confederations)
- Venues: 17 (in 14 host cities)

Final positions
- Champions: Italy (3rd title)
- Runners-up: West Germany
- Third place: Poland
- Fourth place: France

Tournament statistics
- Matches played: 52
- Goals scored: 146 (2.81 per match)
- Attendance: 2,109,723 (40,572 per match)
- Top scorer: (Italy) Paolo Rossi (6 goals)
- Best player: (Italy) Paolo Rossi
- Best young player: (France) Manuel Amoros
- Fair play award: Brazil

The 1982 FIFA World Cup was the 12th FIFA World Cup, the quadrennial football tournament for men's senior national teams, and was played in Spain from 13 June to 11 July 1982. The tournament was won by Italy, who defeated West Germany 3–1 in the final held in the Santiago Bernabéu Stadium in Madrid. It was Italy's third World Cup title, but their first since 1938. The defending champions, Argentina, were eliminated in the second round (finishing third and last in their group). Algeria, Cameroon, Honduras, Kuwait and New Zealand made their first appearances in a World Cup.

The tournament featured the first penalty shoot-out in World Cup competition. This was the third and last World Cup to feature two rounds of group stages. It was also the third time (after 1934 and 1966) that all four semi-finalists were European.

In the first round of Group 3, Hungary defeated El Salvador 10–1, equalling the largest margin of victory recorded in any edition of the World Cup (Hungary over South Korea 9–0 in 1954, and Yugoslavia over Zaire 9–0 in 1974). Although filled with compelling and entertaining matches, this tournament was marred by violent fouls, poor officiating, overcrowded stadiums, very hot weather and alleged collusion between teams. One particular incident of note was West German goalkeeper Harald Schumacher's foul of French player Patrick Battiston during a semi-final match in Seville, and another was Italian player Claudio Gentile's intense and often violent match-long fouling and marking of Argentine player Diego Maradona. FIFA changed the regulations to somewhat prevent this kind of brutality on the pitch for the subsequent tournament in Mexico.

== Host selection ==
Spain was chosen as the host nation by FIFA in London on 6 July 1966. Hosting rights for the 1974 and 1978 tournaments were awarded at the same time. West Germany and Spain were initially competing for a hosting bid, but ultimately agreed a deal whereby Spain would support West Germany for the 1974 tournament and West Germany would allow Spain to bid for the 1982 World Cup unopposed. As a result, West Germany withdrew its bid for the 1982 edition.

The decision to host the World Cup in Spain was controversial: At the time of Spain being selected, the country was still under the dictatorship of Francisco Franco's regime. However, the regime of Francoist Spain ended by 1975 with the death of Franco. The World Cup had significant effects on Spanish society after the democratic transition because, from the period from 1975 to 1982, Spain was still undergoing a transition from dictatorship to democracy.

== Qualification ==
For the first time ever, the World Cup finals expanded from 16 to 24 teams. This allowed more countries to participate from Africa and Asia.

Northern Ireland qualified for the first time since 1958. Belgium, Czechoslovakia, El Salvador, England and the Soviet Union were all back in the World Cup after 12-year absences. England had its first successful World Cup qualifying campaign in 20 years (they qualified for the 1966 tournament as hosts and for the 1970 tournament as defending champions). Yugoslavia and Chile were also back after missing the 1978 tournament.

Algeria, Cameroon, Honduras, Kuwait, and New Zealand all participated in the World Cup for the first time.

This was the first time that all six confederations (AFC, CAF, CONCACAF, CONMEBOL, OFC and UEFA) sent representative teams to the tournament.

=== List of qualified teams ===
The following 24 teams qualified for the final tournament.

AFC (1)

- Kuwait (debut)

CAF (2)

- Algeria (debut)
- Cameroon (debut)

OFC (1)

- New Zealand (debut)

CONCACAF (2)

- Honduras (debut)
- El Salvador

CONMEBOL (4)

- Argentina (holders)
- Brazil
- Chile
- Peru

UEFA (14)

- Austria
- Belgium
- Czechoslovakia
- England
- France
- Hungary
- Italy
- Northern Ireland
- Poland
- Scotland
- Soviet Union
- Spain (hosts)
- West Germany
- Yugoslavia

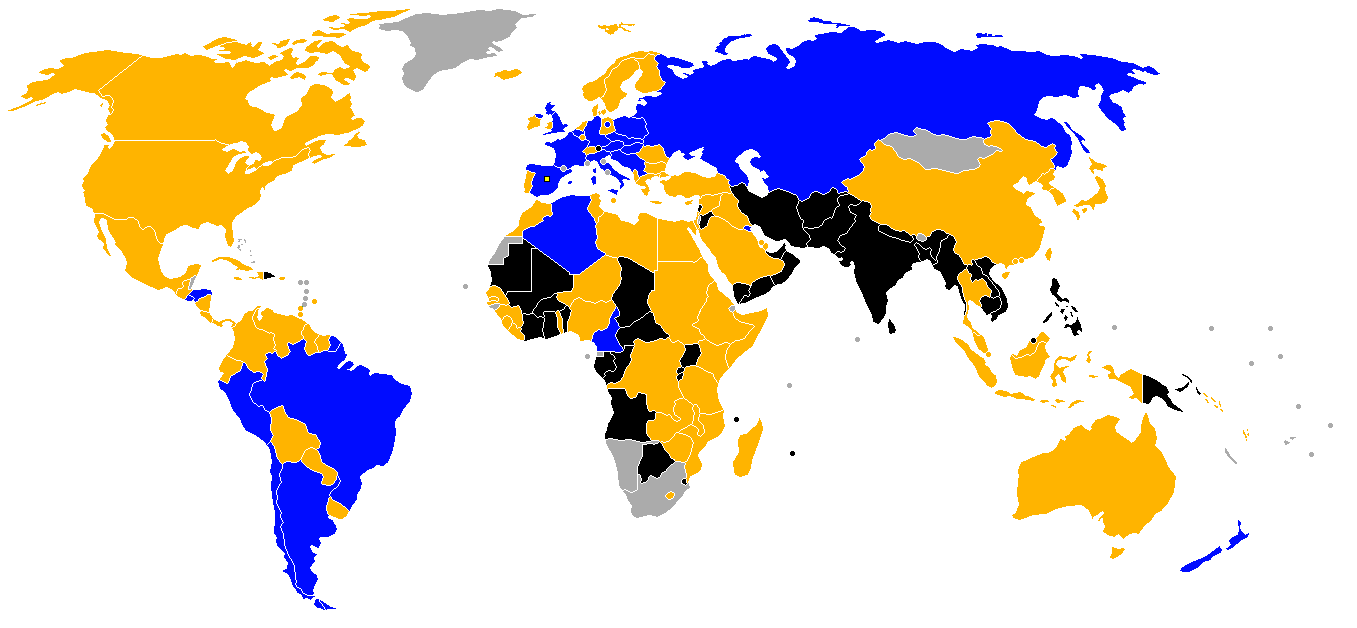
Countries qualified for World Cup Country did not qualify Countries that did not enter World Cup Country not a FIFA member

As of 2026, this was the last time El Salvador qualified for the World Cup finals, the only time Kuwait have qualified, and the last time Mexico (who were disqualified from 1990) and South Korea failed to qualify.

== Summary ==
=== Format ===
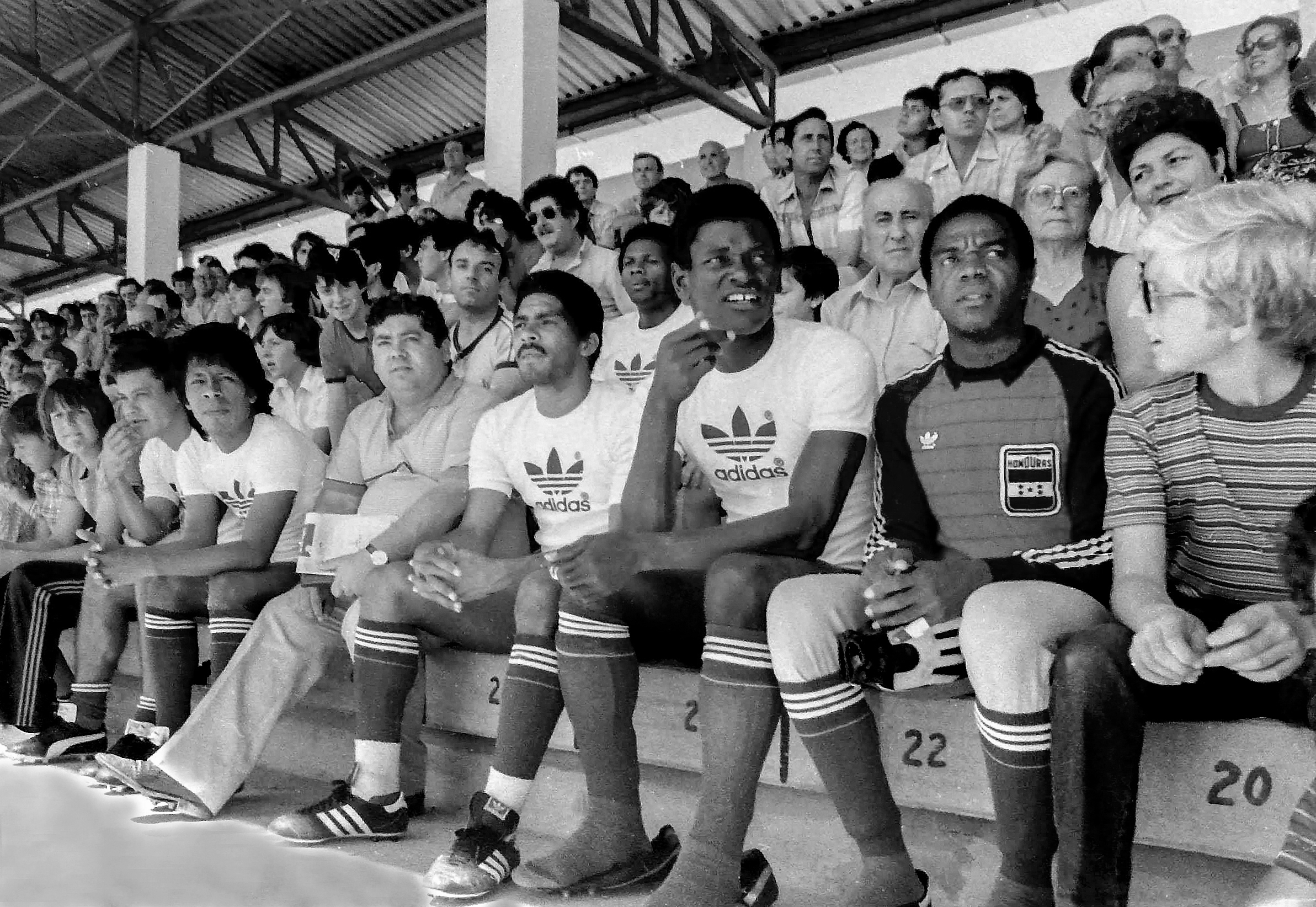
Honduras team in Alginet, during a June 1982 preparatory match.

The first round was a round-robin group stage containing six groups of four teams each. Two points were awarded for a win and one for a draw, with goal difference used to separate teams equal on points. The top two teams in each group advanced. In the second round, the twelve remaining teams were split into four groups of three teams each, with the winner of each group progressing to the knockout semi-final stage.

The composition of the groups in the second round was determined before the start of the tournament. Groups A and B were to include one team from each of Groups 1 through 6, and Groups C and D included the remaining six teams. The winners of Groups 1 and 3 were in Group A while the runners-up were in Group C. The winners of Groups 2 and 4 were in Group B while the runners-up were in Group D. The winner of Group 5 was in Group D and the runner-up was in Group B. The winner of Group 6 was in Group C and the runner-up was in Group A. Thus, Group A mirrored Group C, and Group B mirrored Group D with the winners and runners-up from the first round being placed into opposite groups in the second round.

Group A	Group B	Group C	Group D
Winner G1	Winner G2	Winner G6	Winner G5
Winner G3	Winner G4	Runner-up G1	Runner-up G2
Runner-up G6	Runner-up G5	Runner-up G3	Runner-up G4

The second-round groups that mirrored each other (based on the first-round groupings) faced off against each other in the semi-finals. Thus, the Group A winner played the Group C winner, and the Group B winner played the Group D winner. This meant that if two teams which played in the same first-round group both emerged from the second round, they would meet for the second time of the tournament in a semi-final match. It also guaranteed that the final match would feature two teams that had not previously played each other in the tournament. Italy and Poland who were both in Group 1 in the first round, each won their second-round groups and played each other in a semi-final match.

=== First group stage ===
In Group 1, newcomers Cameroon held both Poland and Italy to draws, and were denied a place in the next round on the basis of having scored fewer goals than Italy (the sides had an equal goal difference). Poland and Italy qualified over Cameroon and Peru. Italian journalists and tifosi criticised their team for their uninspired performances that managed three draws; the squad was reeling from the recent Serie A scandal, where national players were suspended for match fixing and illegal betting.

Group 2 featured one of the great World Cup upsets on the first day, the 2–1 victory of Algeria over reigning European Champions West Germany. In the final match in the group, West Germany met Austria in a match later dubbed as the "Disgrace of Gijón". Algeria had already played their final group game on the previous day, and West Germany and Austria knew that a West German win by one or two goals would qualify them both, while a larger German victory would qualify Algeria over Austria, and a draw or an Austrian win would eliminate the Germans. After 10 minutes of all-out attack, West Germany scored a goal by Horst Hrubesch. After that solitary goal, the two teams kicked the ball around aimlessly for the rest of the match. Chants of "Fuera, fuera" ("Out, out") were screamed by the Spanish crowd, while angry Algerian supporters waved banknotes at the players. This performance was widely deplored, even by the German and Austrian fans. One German fan was so upset by his team's display that he burned his German flag in disgust. Algeria protested to FIFA, who ruled that the result would stand; FIFA introduced a revised qualification system at subsequent World Cups in which the final two games in each group were played simultaneously.

In Group 3, which featured the opening ceremony and first match of the tournament, Belgium defeated the defending champion Argentina 1–0. The Camp Nou stadium was the home of Barcelona, and many fans had wanted to see the club's new signing, Argentinian star Diego Maradona, who did not perform to expectations. Both Belgium and Argentina ultimately advanced at the expense of Hungary and El Salvador despite Hungary's 10–1 win over the Central American nation – which, with a total of 11 goals, is the second highest scoreline in a World Cup game (equal with Brazil's 6–5 victory over Poland in the 1938 tournament and Hungary's 8–3 victory over West Germany in the 1954 tournament).

Group 4 opened with England midfielder Bryan Robson's goal against France after only 27 seconds of play. England won 3–1 and qualified along with France over Czechoslovakia and Kuwait, though the tiny Gulf emirate held Czechoslovakia to a 1–1 draw. In the game between Kuwait and France, with France leading 3–1, France midfielder Alain Giresse scored a goal vehemently contested by the Kuwait team, who had stopped play after hearing a piercing whistle from the stands, which they thought had come from Soviet referee Miroslav Stupar. Play had not yet resumed when Sheikh Fahad Al-Ahmed Al-Jaber Al-Sabah, brother of the then-Kuwaiti Emir and president of the Kuwait Football Association, rushed onto the pitch to remonstrate with the referee. Stupar reversed his initial decision and disallowed the goal to the fury of the French. Maxime Bossis scored another valid goal a few minutes later and France won 4–1.

In Group 5, Honduras held hosts Spain to a 1–1 draw. Northern Ireland won the group outright, eliminating Yugoslavia and beating hosts Spain 1–0; Northern Ireland had to play the majority of the second half with ten men after Mal Donaghy was dismissed. Spain narrowly avoided elimination due to a huge referee error, securing a contentious 2–1 victory over Yugoslavia, largely attributed to a disputed penalty decision. At 17 years and 41 days, Northern Ireland forward Norman Whiteside was the youngest player to appear in a World Cup match.

Brazil were in Group 6. With Zico, Sócrates, Falcão, Éder and others, they boasted an offensive firepower that promised a return to the glory days of 1970. They beat the USSR 2–1 thanks to a 20-metre Éder goal two minutes from time, then Scotland and New Zealand with four goals each. The Soviets took the group's other qualifying berth on goal difference at the expense of the Scots.

=== Second group stage ===
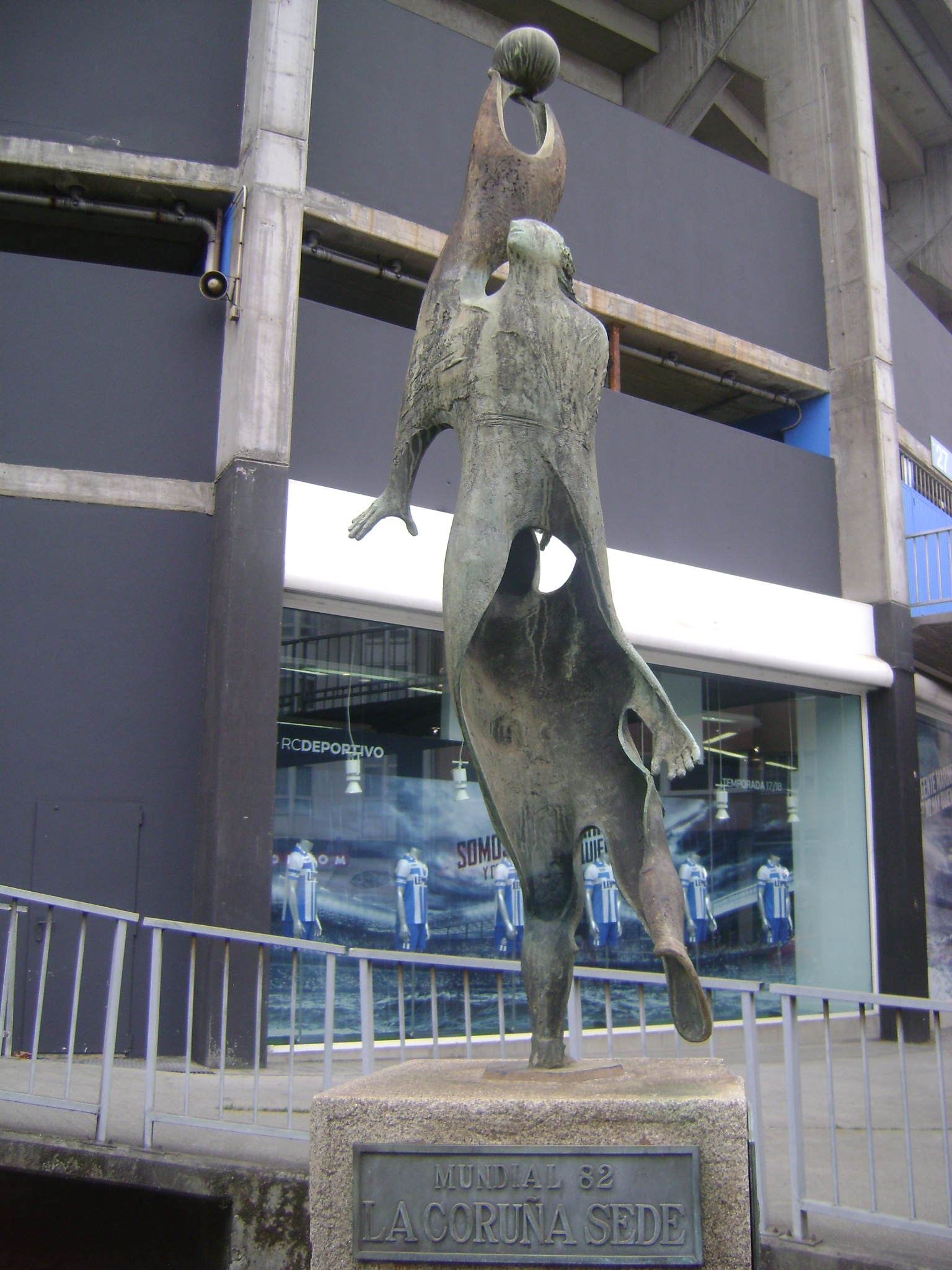
A statue commemorating the 1982 FIFA World Cup at the Estadio Riazor in A Coruña.

Poland opened Group A with a 3–0 defeat of Belgium thanks to a Zbigniew Boniek hat-trick. The Soviet Union prevailed 1–0 in the next match over Belgium. The Poles edged out the USSR for the semi-final spot on the final day on goal difference thanks to a 0–0 draw in a politically charged match, as Poland's then-Communist government had imposed a martial law a few months earlier to quash internal dissent.

In Group B, a match between England and West Germany ended in a goalless draw. West Germany put the pressure on England in their second match by beating Spain 2–1. The home side drew 0–0 against England, denying Ron Greenwood's team a semi-final place and putting England in the same position as Cameroon, being eliminated without losing a game.

In Group C, with Brazil, Argentina and Italy, in the opener, Italy prevailed 2–1 over Diego Maradona and Mario Kempes's side after a game in which Italian defenders Gaetano Scirea and Claudio Gentile proved themselves equal to the task of stopping the Argentinian attack. Argentina now needed a win over Brazil on the second day, but lost 3–1 – Argentina only scoring in the last minute. Maradona kicked João Batista in the groin and was sent off in the 85th minute.

The match between Brazil and Italy pitted Brazil's attack against Italy's defence, with the majority of the game played around the Italian area, and with the Italian midfielders and defenders returning the repeated set volleys of Brazilian shooters such as Zico, Sócrates and Falcão. Italian centre back Gentile was assigned to mark Brazilian striker Zico, earning a yellow card and a suspension for the semi-final. Paolo Rossi opened the scoring when he headed in Antonio Cabrini's cross with just five minutes played. Sócrates equalised for Brazil seven minutes later. In the twenty-fifth minute Rossi stepped past Júnior, intercepted a pass from Cerezo across the Brazilians' goal, and drilled the shot home. The Brazilians threw everything in search of another equaliser, while Italy defended bravely. On 68 minutes, Falcão collected a pass from Júnior and as Cerezo's dummy run distracted three defenders, fired home from 20 yards out. Now Italy had gained the lead twice thanks to Rossi's goals, and Brazil had come back twice; at 2–2, Brazil would have been through on goal difference, but in the 74th minute, a poor clearance from an Italian corner kick went back to the Brazilian six-yard line where Rossi and Francesco Graziani were waiting. Both aimed at the same shot, Rossi connecting to get a hat trick and sending Italy into the lead for good. In the 86th minute Giancarlo Antognoni scored an apparent fourth goal for Italy, but it was wrongly disallowed for offside. In the dying moments Dino Zoff made a miraculous save to deny Oscar a goal, ensuring that Italy advanced to the semi-final.

In the last group, Group D, France dispatched Austria 1–0 with a free kick goal by Bernard Genghini, and then defeated Northern Ireland 4–1 to reach their first semi-final since 1958.

=== Semi-finals, match for third place and final ===
In a re-match of the encounter in the first round, Italy beat Poland in the first semi-final through two goals from Paolo Rossi. In the game between France and West Germany, the Germans opened the scoring through a Pierre Littbarski strike in the 17th minute, and the French equalised nine minutes later with a Michel Platini penalty. In the second half a long through ball sent French defender Patrick Battiston racing clear towards the German goal. With both Battiston and the lone German defender trying to be the first to reach the ball, Battiston flicked it past German keeper Harald Schumacher from the edge of the German penalty area and Schumacher reacted by jumping up to block. Schumacher did not seem to go for the ball, however, and clattered straight into the oncoming Battiston – which left the French player unconscious and knocked two of his teeth out. Schumacher's action has been described as "one of history's most shocking fouls". The ball went just wide of the post and Dutch referee Charles Corver deemed Schumacher's tackle on Battiston not to be a foul and awarded a goal kick. Play was interrupted for several minutes while Battiston, still unconscious and with a broken jaw, was carried off the field on a stretcher.

After French defender Manuel Amoros had sent a 25-metre drive crashing onto the West German crossbar in the final minute, the match went into extra time. On 92 minutes, France's sweeper Marius Trésor fired a swerving volley under Schumacher's crossbar from ten metres out to make it 2–1. Six minutes later, an unmarked Alain Giresse drove in an 18-metre shot off the inside of the right post to finish off a counter-attack and put France up 3–1. But West Germany would not give up. In the 102nd minute a counter-attack culminated in a cross that recent substitute Karl-Heinz Rummenigge turned in at the near post from a difficult angle with the outside of his foot, reducing France's lead to 3–2. Then in the 108th minute Germany took a short corner and after France failed to clear, the ball was played by Germany to Littbarski whose cross to Horst Hrubesch was headed back to the centre towards Klaus Fischer, who was unmarked but with his back to goal. Fischer in turn volleyed the ball past French keeper Jean-Luc Ettori with a bicycle kick, levelling the scores at 3–3.

The resulting penalty shoot-out was the first at a World Cup finals. Giresse, Manfred Kaltz, Manuel Amoros, Paul Breitner and Dominique Rocheteau all converted penalties until Uli Stielike was stopped by Ettori, giving France the advantage. But then Schumacher stepped forward, lifted the tearful Stielike from the ground, and saved Didier Six's shot. With Germany handed the lifeline they needed Littbarski converted his penalty, followed by Platini for France, and then Rummenigge for Germany as the tension mounted. France defender Maxime Bossis then had his kick parried by Schumacher who anticipated it, and Hrubesch stepped up to score and send Germany to the World Cup final yet again with a victory on penalties, 5–4.

"After I scored, my whole life passed before me – the same feeling they say you have when you are about to die, the joy of scoring in a World Cup final was immense, something I dreamed about as a kid, and my celebration was a release after realising that dream. I was born with that scream inside me, that was just the moment it came out."

— Italian midfielder Marco Tardelli on his iconic goal celebration from the 1982 World Cup Final.

In the match for third place, Poland edged the French side 3–2 which matched Poland's best performance at a World Cup previously achieved in 1974. France would go on to win the European Championship two years later.

In the final, Antonio Cabrini fired a penalty wide of goal in the first half. In the second half, Paolo Rossi scored first for the third straight game by heading home Gentile's bouncing cross at close range. Exploiting the situation, Italy scored twice more on quick counter-strikes, all the while capitalising on their defence to hold the Germans. With Gentile and Gaetano Scirea holding the centre, the Italian strikers were free to counter-punch the weakened German defence. Marco Tardelli's shot from the edge of the area beat Schumacher first, and Alessandro Altobelli, the substitute for injured striker Francesco Graziani, made it 3–0 at the end of a solo sprint down the right side by the stand-out winger Bruno Conti. Italy's lead appeared secure, encouraging Italian president Sandro Pertini to wag his finger at the cameras in a playful "not going to catch us now" gesture. In the 83rd minute, Paul Breitner scored for West Germany, but it was only a consolation goal as Italy won 3–1 to claim their first World Cup title in 44 years, and their third in total.

== Records ==
Italy became the first team to advance from the first round without winning a game, drawing all three (while Cameroon were eliminated in the same way by virtue of having only one goal scored against Italy's two), and also the first of two World Cup winners to draw or lose three matches (Argentina matched this by drawing two games and losing one in 2022). By winning, Italy equalled Brazil's record of winning the World Cup three times. Italy's total of twelve goals scored in seven matches set a new low for average goals scored per game by a World Cup winning side (subsequently exceeded by Spain in 2010), while Italy's aggregate goal difference of +6 for the tournament remains a record low for a champion, equalled by Spain. England became the first and only side in European history to not select a player from that season's European Cup winning team, Aston Villa, in any match.

Italy's 40-year-old captain-goalkeeper Dino Zoff became the oldest player to win the World Cup. This was the first World Cup in which teams from all six continental confederations participated, something that did not happen again until 2006.

== Venues ==
Venues of the 1982 FIFA World Cup

Seventeen stadiums in fourteen cities hosted the tournament, a record that stood until the 2002 tournament, which was played in twenty stadiums in two countries. The most used venue was FC Barcelona's Camp Nou stadium, which hosted five matches, including a semi-final; it was the largest stadium used for this tournament. With Sarrià Stadium also hosting three matches, Barcelona was the Spanish city with the most matches in España 1982 with eight; Madrid, the nation's capital, followed with seven. The only new stadium built for this tournament was the Jose Zorrilla stadium in Valladolid.

This particular World Cup was organised in such a way that all of the matches of each of the six groups were assigned stadiums in cities near to each other, in order to reduce the stress of travel on the players and fans. For example, Group 1 matches were played in Vigo and A Coruña, Group 2 in Gijón and Oviedo, Group 3 in Elche and Alicante (except for the first match, which was the opening match of the tournament, which was played at the Camp Nou), Group 4 in Bilbao and Valladolid, Group 5 (which included hosts Spain) in Valencia and Zaragoza, and Group 6 in Seville and Malaga (of the three first-round matches in Seville, the first match between Brazil and the Soviet Union was played in the Pizjuán Stadium, and the other two were played in the Villamarín Stadium). Group stage matches in the milder northern cities like Bilbao or Gijón would start at 17:00, while the matches in the southern cities like Seville or Valencia would start at 21:00, in an attempt to avoid the intense southern Spanish summer heat.

When the tournament went into the round-robin second round matches, all the aforementioned cities excluding Barcelona, Alicante and Seville did not host any more matches in España 1982. Both the Santiago Bernabéu and Vicente Calderón stadiums in Madrid and the Sarrià Stadium in Barcelona were used for the first time for this tournament for the second round matches. Madrid and Barcelona hosted the four second round group matches; Barcelona hosted Groups A and C (Camp Nou hosted all three of Group A's matches, and Sarrià did the same with Group C's matches) and Madrid hosted Groups B and D (Real Madrid's Bernabeu Stadium hosted all three of Group B's matches, and Atlético Madrid's Calderon Stadium did the same with the Group D matches)

The two semi final matches were held at Camp Nou and the Pizjuán Stadium in Seville, the third largest stadium used for the tournament (one of only two España 1982 matches it hosted), the match for third place was held in Alicante and the final was held at the Bernabeu, the second largest stadium used for this tournament.

Barcelona		Madrid	
Camp Nou	Sarrià	Santiago Bernabéu	Vicente Calderón
Capacity: 121,401	Capacity: 40,400	Capacity: 90,089	Capacity: 65,695
Seville		Elche	Valencia
Ramón Sánchez Pizjuán	Benito Villamarín	Nuevo Estadio	Luis Casanova
Capacity: 68,110	Capacity: 50,253	Capacity: 53,290	Capacity: 49,562
Bilbao	Gijón	Málaga	Zaragoza
San Mamés	El Molinón	La Rosaleda	La Romareda
Capacity: 46,223	Capacity: 45,153	Capacity: 45,000	Capacity: 41,806
A Coruña	Vigo	Alicante	Valladolid
Riazor	Balaídos	José Rico Pérez	José Zorrilla
Capacity: 34,190	Capacity: 33,000	Capacity: 32,500	Capacity: 30,043
Oviedo
Carlos Tartiere
Capacity: 22,284

== Match officials ==
AFC

- (Bahrain) Ibrahim Youssef Al-Doy
- (Hong Kong) Chan Tam Sun
- (Israel) Abraham Klein

CAF

- (Ghana) Benjamin Dwomoh
- (Libya) Yousef El-Ghoul
- (Algeria) Belaid Lacarne

CONCACAF

- (Guatemala) Rómulo Méndez
- (Mexico) Mario Rubio Vázquez
- (Costa Rica) Luis Paulino Siles
- (United States) David Socha

CONMEBOL

- (Colombia) Gilberto Aristizábal
- (Bolivia) Luis Barrancos
- (Uruguay) Juan Daniel Cardellino
- (Chile) Gastón Castro
- (Brazil) Arnaldo Cézar Coelho
- (Argentina) Arturo Ithurralde
- (Peru) Enrique Labo Revoredo
- (Paraguay) Héctor Ortiz

UEFA

- (Italy) Paolo Casarin
- (Czechoslovakia) Vojtech Christov
- (Netherlands) Charles Corver
- (Bulgaria) Bogdan Dotchev
- (West Germany) Walter Eschweiler
- (Sweden) Erik Fredriksson
- (Switzerland) Bruno Galler
- (Portugal) António Garrido
- (Poland) Alojzy Jarguz
- (Spain) Augusto Lamo Castillo
- (Denmark) Henning Lund-Sørensen
- (Socialist Federal Republic of Yugoslavia) Damir Matovinović
- (Northern Ireland) Malcolm Moffat
- (Hungary) Károly Palotai
- (Belgium) Alexis Ponnet
- (East Germany) Adolf Prokop
- (Romania) Nicolae Rainea
- (Soviet Union) Miroslav Stupar
- (Scotland) Bob Valentine
- (France) Michel Vautrot
- (England) Clive White
- (Austria) Franz Wöhrer

OFC

- (Australia) Tony Boskovic

== Squads ==
For a list of all squads that appeared in the final tournament, see 1982 FIFA World Cup squads.

== Groups ==
=== Seeding ===
The 24 qualifiers were divided into four groupings which formed the basis of the draw for the group stage. FIFA announced the six seeded teams on the day of the draw and allocated them in advance to the six groups; as had become standard, the host nation and the reigning champions were among the seeds. The seeded teams would play all their group matches at the same venue (with the exception of World Cup holders Argentina who would play in the opening game scheduled for the Camp Nou, the largest of the venues). The remaining 18 teams were split into three pots based on FIFA's assessment of the team's strength, but also taking in account geographic considerations. The seedings and group venues for those teams were tentatively agreed at an informal meeting in December 1981 but not officially confirmed until the day of the draw. FIFA executive Hermann Neuberger told the press that the seeding of England had been challenged by other nations, but they were to be seeded as "the Spanish want England to play in Bilbao for security reasons"*.

Seeded teams	Pot A	Pot B	Pot C
Spain (hosts); Argentina (winner in 1978); Brazil (third in 1978) (1970 winner); England (seeded on security grounds) (1966 winner) (1970 quarter finalist as holder); Italy (fourth in 1978) (1970 runner up); West Germany (1980 Euro winner) (1974 winner)	Austria; Czechoslovakia; Hungary; Poland; Soviet Union; Yugoslavia	Belgium; France; Northern Ireland; Scotland; Chile; Peru	Algeria; Cameroon; Kuwait; El Salvador; Honduras; New Zealand

=== Final draw ===
On 16 January 1982, the draw was conducted at the Palacio de Congresos in Madrid, where the teams were drawn out from the three pots to be placed with the seeded teams in their predetermined groups. Firstly a draw was made to decide the order in which the three drums containing pots A, B and C would be emptied; this resulted in the order being pot B, C and A. The teams were then drawn one-by-one out of the respective pot and entered in the groups in that order. A number was then drawn to determine the team's "position" in the group and hence the fixtures.

The only stipulation of the draw was that no group could feature two South American teams. As a result, Pot B – which contained two South American teams – was initially drawn with only the four Europeans in the pot. These first two European teams drawn from pot B were then to be immediately allocated to Groups 3 and 6 which contained the two South American seeds Argentina and Brazil. Once these two groups had been filled with the entrants from Pot B, Chile and Peru would be added to the pot and the draw would continue as normal. In the event, FIFA executives Sepp Blatter and Hermann Neuberger conducting the draw initially forgot this stipulation and therefore immediately placed the first team drawn from this pot (Belgium) into Group 1, rather than Group 3 as planned, before then placing the second team drawn out (Scotland) into Group 3; they then had to correct this by moving Belgium to Group 3 and Scotland into Group 6. The ceremony suffered further embarrassment when one of the revolving drums containing the teams broke down.

== First group stage ==
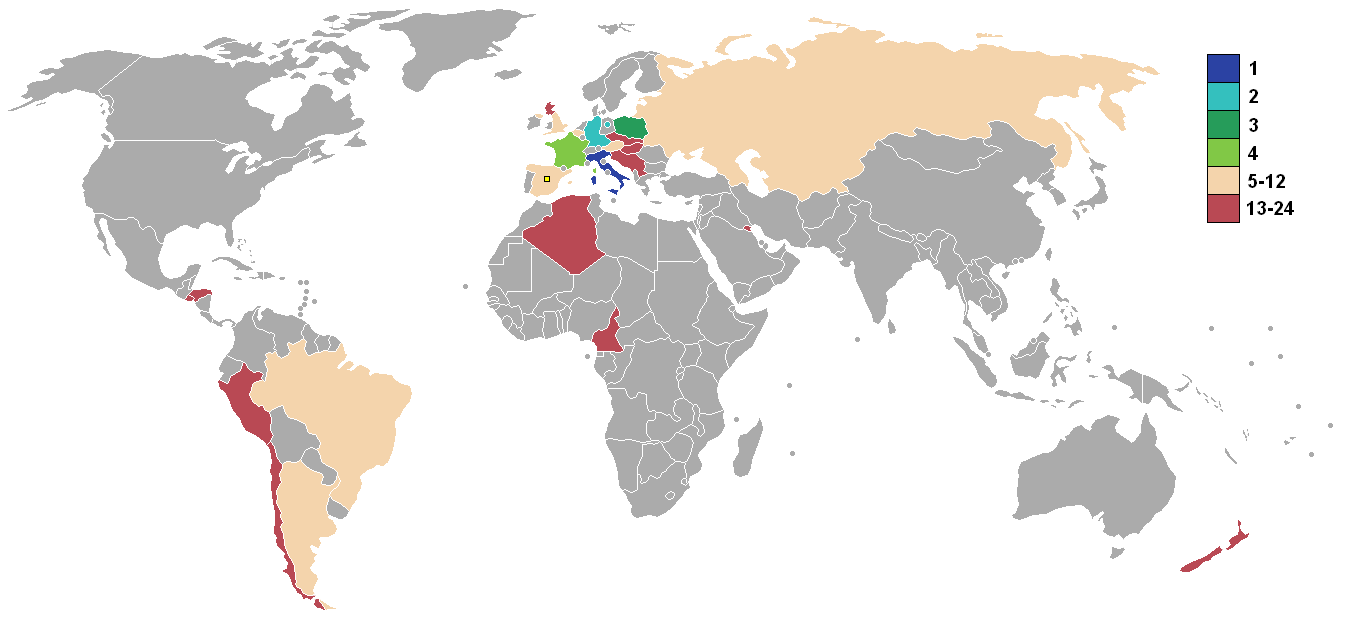
Champion Runner-up Third place Fourth place Second group stage First group stage

The group winners and runners-up advanced to the second round.

Teams were ranked on the following criteria:

1. Greater number of points in all group matches
2. Goal difference in all group matches
3. Greater number of goals scored in all group matches
4. Drawing of lots

All times are Central European Summer Time (UTC+2)

=== Group 1 ===
Pos	Team	Pld	W	D	L	GF	GA	GD	Pts	Qualification
1	Poland	3	1	2	0	5	1	+4	4	Advance to second round
2	Italy	3	0	3	0	2	2	0	3	Advance to second round
3	Cameroon	3	0	3	0	1	1	0	3	
4	Peru	3	0	2	1	2	6	−4	2	

Source: FIFA
14 June 1982
17:15 CEST

Italy	0–0	Poland

Balaídos, Vigo
Attendance: 33,000
Referee: Michel Vautrot (France)
15 June 1982
17:15 CEST

Peru	0–0	Cameroon

Estadio de Riazor, A Coruña
Attendance: 11,000
Referee: Franz Wöhrer (Austria)

18 June 1982
17:15 CEST

Italy	1–1	Peru
Conti 18'		Díaz 83'

Balaídos, Vigo
Attendance: 25,000
Referee: Walter Eschweiler (West Germany)
19 June 1982
17:15 CEST

Poland	0–0	Cameroon

Estadio de Riazor, A Coruña
Attendance: 19,000
Referee: Alexis Ponnet (Belgium)

22 June 1982
17:15 CEST

Poland	5–1	Peru
Smolarek 55'; Lato 58'; Boniek 61'; Buncol 68'; Ciołek 76'		La Rosa 83'

Estadio de Riazor, A Coruña
Attendance: 25,000
Referee: Mario Rubio Vázquez (Mexico)
23 June 1982
17:15 CEST

Italy	1–1	Cameroon
Graziani 60'		M'Bida 61'

Balaídos, Vigo
Attendance: 20,000
Referee: Bogdan Dotchev (Bulgaria)

=== Group 2 ===
Pos	Team	Pld	W	D	L	GF	GA	GD	Pts	Qualification
1	West Germany	3	2	0	1	6	3	+3	4	Advance to second round
2	Austria	3	2	0	1	3	1	+2	4	Advance to second round
3	Algeria	3	2	0	1	5	5	0	4	
4	Chile	3	0	0	3	3	8	−5	0	

Source: FIFA
16 June 1982
17:15 CEST

West Germany	1–2	Algeria
Rummenigge 67'		Madjer 54'; Belloumi 68'

El Molinón, Gijón
Attendance: 42,000
Referee: Enrique Labo Revoredo (Peru)
17 June 1982
17:15 CEST

Chile	0–1	Austria
		Schachner 22'

Estadio Carlos Tartiere, Oviedo
Attendance: 22,500
Referee: Juan Daniel Cardellino (Uruguay)

20 June 1982
17:15 CEST

West Germany	4–1	Chile
Rummenigge 9', 57', 66'; Reinders 83'		Moscoso 90'

El Molinón, Gijón
Attendance: 42,000
Referee: Bruno Galler (Switzerland)
21 June 1982
17:15 CEST

Algeria	0–2	Austria
		Schachner 55'; Krankl 67'

Estadio Carlos Tartiere, Oviedo
Attendance: 22,000
Referee: Tony Boskovic (Australia)

24 June 1982
17:15 CEST

Algeria	3–2	Chile
Assad 7', 31'; Bensaoula 35'		Neira 59' (pen.); Letelier 73'

Estadio Carlos Tartiere, Oviedo
Attendance: 16,000
Referee: Rómulo Méndez (Guatemala)
25 June 1982
17:15 CEST

West Germany	1–0	Austria
Hrubesch 10'

El Molinón, Gijón
Attendance: 41,000
Referee: Bob Valentine (Scotland)

=== Group 3 ===
Pos	Team	Pld	W	D	L	GF	GA	GD	Pts	Qualification
1	Belgium	3	2	1	0	3	1	+2	5	Advance to second round
2	Argentina	3	2	0	1	6	2	+4	4	Advance to second round
3	Hungary	3	1	1	1	12	6	+6	3	
4	El Salvador	3	0	0	3	1	13	−12	0	

Source: FIFA
13 June 1982
20:00 CEST

Argentina	0–1	Belgium
		Vandenbergh 62'

Camp Nou, Barcelona
Attendance: 95,000
Referee: Vojtech Christov (Czechoslovakia)
15 June 1982
21:00 CEST

Hungary	10–1	El Salvador
Nyilasi 4', 83'; Pölöskei 11'; Fazekas 23', 54'; Tóth 50'; L. Kiss 69', 72', 76'; Szentes 70'		Ramírez 64'

Nuevo Estadio, Elche
Attendance: 23,000
Referee: Ibrahim Youssef Al-Doy (Bahrain)

18 June 1982
21:00 CEST

Argentina	4–1	Hungary
Bertoni 26'; Maradona 28', 57'; Ardiles 60'		Pölöskei 76'

Estadio José Rico Pérez, Alicante
Attendance: 32,093
Referee: Belaïd Lacarne (Algeria)
19 June 1982
21:00 CEST

Belgium	1–0	El Salvador
Coeck 19'

Nuevo Estadio, Elche
Attendance: 15,000
Referee: Malcolm Moffat (Northern Ireland)

22 June 1982
21:00 CEST

Belgium	1–1	Hungary
Czerniatynski 76'		Varga 27'

Nuevo Estadio, Elche
Attendance: 37,000
Referee: Clive White (England)
23 June 1982
21:00 CEST

Argentina	2–0	El Salvador
Passarella 22' (pen.); Bertoni 54'

Estadio José Rico Pérez, Alicante
Attendance: 32,500
Referee: Luis Barrancos (Bolivia)

=== Group 4 ===
Pos	Team	Pld	W	D	L	GF	GA	GD	Pts	Qualification
1	England	3	3	0	0	6	1	+5	6	Advance to second round
2	France	3	1	1	1	6	5	+1	3	Advance to second round
3	Czechoslovakia	3	0	2	1	2	4	−2	2	
4	Kuwait	3	0	1	2	2	6	−4	1	

Source: FIFA
16 June 1982
17:15 CEST

England	3–1	France
Robson 1', 67'; Mariner 83'		Soler 24'

San Mamés, Bilbao
Attendance: 44,172
Referee: António Garrido (Portugal)
17 June 1982
17:15 CEST

Czechoslovakia	1–1	Kuwait
Panenka 21' (pen.)		Al-Dakhil 57'

Estadio José Zorrilla, Valladolid
Attendance: 25,000
Referee: Benjamin Dwomoh (Ghana)

20 June 1982
17:15 CEST

England	2–0	Czechoslovakia
Francis 62'; Barmoš 66' (o.g.)

San Mamés, Bilbao
Attendance: 41,123
Referee: Charles Corver (Netherlands)
21 June 1982
17:15 CEST

France	4–1	Kuwait
Genghini 31'; Platini 43'; Six 48'; Bossis 89'		A.M. Al-Buloushi 75'

Estadio José Zorrilla, Valladolid
Attendance: 30,043
Referee: Myroslav Stupar (Soviet Union)

24 June 1982
17:15 CEST

France	1–1	Czechoslovakia
Six 66'		Panenka 84' (pen.)

Estadio José Zorrilla, Valladolid
Attendance: 28,000
Referee: Paolo Casarin (Italy)
25 June 1982
17:15 CEST

England	1–0	Kuwait
Francis 27'

San Mamés, Bilbao
Attendance: 39,700
Referee: Gilberto Aristizábal (Colombia)

=== Group 5 ===
Pos	Team	Pld	W	D	L	GF	GA	GD	Pts	Qualification
1	Northern Ireland	3	1	2	0	2	1	+1	4	Advance to second round
2	Spain (H)	3	1	1	1	3	3	0	3	Advance to second round
3	Yugoslavia	3	1	1	1	2	2	0	3	
4	Honduras	3	0	2	1	2	3	−1	2	

Source: FIFA
(H) Hosts
16 June 1982
21:00 CEST

Spain	1–1	Honduras
López Ufarte 65' (pen.)		Zelaya 8'

Estadio Luis Casanova, Valencia
Attendance: 49,562
Referee: Arturo Ithurralde (Argentina)
17 June 1982
21:00 CEST

Yugoslavia	0–0	Northern Ireland

La Romareda, Zaragoza
Attendance: 25,000
Referee: Erik Fredriksson (Sweden)

20 June 1982
21:00 CEST

Spain	2–1	Yugoslavia
Juanito 14' (pen.); Saura 66'		Gudelj 10'

Estadio Luis Casanova, Valencia
Attendance: 48,000
Referee: Henning Lund-Sørensen (Denmark)
21 June 1982
21:00 CEST

Honduras	1–1	Northern Ireland
Laing 60'		Armstrong 10'

La Romareda, Zaragoza
Attendance: 15,000
Referee: Chan Tam Sun (Hong Kong)

24 June 1982
21:00 CEST

Honduras	0–1	Yugoslavia
		Petrović 88' (pen.)

La Romareda, Zaragoza
Attendance: 25,000
Referee: Gastón Castro (Chile)
25 June 1982
21:00 CEST

Spain	0–1	Northern Ireland
		Armstrong 47'

Estadio Luis Casanova, Valencia
Attendance: 49,562
Referee: Héctor Ortiz (Paraguay)

=== Group 6 ===
Pos	Team	Pld	W	D	L	GF	GA	GD	Pts	Qualification
1	Brazil	3	3	0	0	10	2	+8	6	Advance to second round
2	Soviet Union	3	1	1	1	6	4	+2	3	Advance to second round
3	Scotland	3	1	1	1	8	8	0	3	
4	New Zealand	3	0	0	3	2	12	−10	0	

Source: FIFA
14 June 1982
21:00 CEST

Brazil	2–1	Soviet Union
Sócrates 75'; Éder 88'		Bal 34'

Ramón Sánchez Pizjuán, Seville
Attendance: 68,000
Referee: Augusto Lamo Castillo (Spain)
15 June 1982
21:00 CEST

Scotland	5–2	New Zealand
Dalglish 18'; Wark 29', 32'; Robertson 73'; Archibald 79'		Sumner 54'; Wooddin 64'

La Rosaleda Stadium, Málaga
Attendance: 36,000
Referee: David Socha (United States)

18 June 1982
21:00 CEST

Brazil	4–1	Scotland
Zico 33'; Oscar 48'; Éder 63'; Falcão 87'		Narey 18'

Estadio Benito Villamarín, Seville
Attendance: 47,379
Referee: Luis Paulino Siles (Costa Rica)
19 June 1982
21:00 CEST

Soviet Union	3–0	New Zealand
Gavrilov 24'; Blokhin 48'; Baltacha 68'

La Rosaleda Stadium, Málaga
Attendance: 19,000
Referee: Yousef Alghoul (Libya)

22 June 1982
21:00 CEST

Soviet Union	2–2	Scotland
Chivadze 59'; Shengelia 84'		Jordan 15'; Souness 86'

La Rosaleda Stadium, Málaga
Attendance: 45,000
Referee: Nicolae Rainea (Romania)
23 June 1982
21:00 CEST

Brazil	4–0	New Zealand
Zico 28', 31'; Falcão 64'; Serginho 70'

Estadio Benito Villamarín, Seville
Attendance: 43,000
Referee: Damir Matovinović (Yugoslavia)

== Second group stage ==
The second round of the tournament consisted of four groups of three teams, each played at one stadium in one of Spain's two largest cities: two in Madrid and two in Barcelona. The winners of each group progressed to the semi-finals.

Teams were ranked on the following criteria:

1. Greater number of points in all group matches
2. Goal difference in all group matches
3. Greater number of goals scored in all group matches
4. Whether the team finished first or second in their first round group
5. Drawing of lots

Although the fixtures were provisionally determined in advance, the teams competing in each fixture depended on the result of the opening match in each group: Should a team lose their opening game of the group, that team would then have to play in the second fixture against the third team in the group and the winner would, by contrast, be rewarded by not needing to play again until the final fixture of the group and therefore gained extra recovery time. If the opening game was a draw, the predetermined order of games would proceed as planned. These regulations helped ensure that the final group games were of importance as no team could already have progressed to the semi-finals by the end of the second fixtures.

The 43,000-capacity Sarria Stadium in Barcelona, used for the Group C round-robin matches between Italy, Argentina and Brazil was, unlike any of the other matches (except 1) in the other groups, severely overcrowded for all three matches. The venue was then heavily criticised for its lack of space and inability to handle such rampant crowds; although no one had foreseen such crowds at all; the Group A matches held at the nearby and much larger 121,401-capacity Camp Nou stadium never went past 65,000 and hosted all European teams; it was anticipated there would be larger crowds for the Camp Nou-hosted second round matches between Belgium, the Soviet Union and Poland.

=== Group A ===
Pos	Team	Pld	W	D	L	GF	GA	GD	Pts	Qualification
1	Poland	2	1	1	0	3	0	+3	3	Advance to knockout stage
2	Soviet Union	2	1	1	0	1	0	+1	3	
3	Belgium	2	0	0	2	0	4	−4	0	

Source: FIFA
28 June 1982
21:00 CEST

Poland	3–0	Belgium
Boniek 4', 26', 53'

Camp Nou, Barcelona
Attendance: 65,000
Referee: Luis Paulino Siles (Costa Rica)

1 July 1982
21:00 CEST

Belgium	0–1	Soviet Union
		Oganesian 48'

Camp Nou, Barcelona
Attendance: 45,000
Referee: Michel Vautrot (France)

4 July 1982
21:00 CEST

Soviet Union	0–0	Poland

Camp Nou, Barcelona
Attendance: 65,000
Referee: Bob Valentine (Scotland)

=== Group B ===
Pos	Team	Pld	W	D	L	GF	GA	GD	Pts	Qualification
1	West Germany	2	1	1	0	2	1	+1	3	Advance to knockout stage
2	England	2	0	2	0	0	0	0	2	
3	Spain (H)	2	0	1	1	1	2	−1	1	

Source: FIFA
(H) Hosts
29 June 1982
21:00 CEST

West Germany	0–0	England

Santiago Bernabéu, Madrid
Attendance: 75,000
Referee: Arnaldo Cézar Coelho (Brazil)

2 July 1982
21:00 CEST

West Germany	2–1	Spain
Littbarski 50'; Fischer 75'		Zamora 82'

Santiago Bernabéu, Madrid
Attendance: 90,089
Referee: Paolo Casarin (Italy)

5 July 1982
21:00 CEST

Spain	0–0	England

Santiago Bernabéu, Madrid
Attendance: 75,000
Referee: Alexis Ponnet (Belgium)

=== Group C ===
Pos	Team	Pld	W	D	L	GF	GA	GD	Pts	Qualification
1	Italy	2	2	0	0	5	3	+2	4	Advance to knockout stage
2	Brazil	2	1	0	1	5	4	+1	2	
3	Argentina	2	0	0	2	2	5	−3	0	

Source: FIFA
29 June 1982
17:15 CEST

Italy	2–1	Argentina
Tardelli 57'; Cabrini 67'		Passarella 83'

Sarrià Stadium, Barcelona
Attendance: 43,000
Referee: Nicolae Rainea (Romania)

2 July 1982
17:15 CEST

Argentina	1–3	Brazil
Díaz 89'		Zico 11'; Serginho 66'; Júnior 75'

Sarrià Stadium, Barcelona
Attendance: 44,000
Referee: Mario Rubio Vázquez (Mexico)

5 July 1982
17:15 CEST

Italy	3–2	Brazil
Rossi 5', 25', 74'		Sócrates 12'; Falcão 68'

Sarrià Stadium, Barcelona
Attendance: 44,000
Referee: Abraham Klein (Israel)

=== Group D ===
Pos	Team	Pld	W	D	L	GF	GA	GD	Pts	Qualification
1	France	2	2	0	0	5	1	+4	4	Advance to knockout stage
2	Austria	2	0	1	1	2	3	−1	1	
3	Northern Ireland	2	0	1	1	3	6	−3	1	

Source: FIFA
28 June 1982
17:15 CEST

Austria	0–1	France
		Genghini 39'

Vicente Calderón, Madrid
Attendance: 37,000
Referee: Károly Palotai (Hungary)

1 July 1982
17:15 CEST

Austria	2–2	Northern Ireland
Pezzey 50'; Hintermaier 68'		Hamilton 27', 75'

Vicente Calderón, Madrid
Attendance: 20,000
Referee: Adolf Prokop (East Germany)

4 July 1982
17:15 CEST

France	4–1	Northern Ireland
Giresse 33', 80'; Rocheteau 46', 68'		Armstrong 75'

Vicente Calderón, Madrid
Attendance: 37,000
Referee: Alojzy Jarguz (Poland)

== Knockout stage ==
=== Bracket ===
Semi-finals
8 July – Barcelona (Camp Nou)
Poland	0
Italy	2
8 July – Seville (Sánchez Pizjuán)
West Germany (p)	3 (5)
France	3 (4)

Final
11 July – Madrid (Bernabéu)
Italy	3
West Germany	1
Match for third place
10 July – Alicante (José Rico Pérez)
Poland	3
France	2

=== Semi-finals ===
8 July 1982
17:15 CEST

Poland	0–2	Italy
		Rossi 22', 73'

Camp Nou, Barcelona
Attendance: 50,000
Referee: Juan Daniel Cardellino (Uruguay)

8 July 1982
21:00 CEST

West Germany	3–3 (a.e.t.)	France
Littbarski 17'; Rummenigge 102'; Fischer 108'		Platini 26' (pen.); Trésor 92'; Giresse 98'
Penalties
Kaltz (penalty scored); Breitner (penalty scored); Stielike (penalty missed); Littbarski (penalty scored); Rummenigge (penalty scored); Hrubesch (penalty scored)	5–4	(penalty scored) Giresse; (penalty scored) Amoros; (penalty scored) Rocheteau; (penalty missed) Six; (penalty scored) Platini; (penalty missed) Bossis

Ramón Sánchez Pizjuán Stadium, Seville
Attendance: 70,000
Referee: Charles Corver (Netherlands)

=== Match for third place ===
10 July 1982
20:00 CEST

Poland	3–2	France
Szarmach 40'; Majewski 44'; Kupcewicz 46'		Girard 13'; Couriol 72'

Estadio José Rico Pérez, Alicante
Attendance: 28,000
Referee: António Garrido (Portugal)

=== Final ===
11 July 1982
20:00 CEST

Italy	3–1	West Germany
Rossi 57'; Tardelli 69'; Altobelli 81'		Breitner 83'

Santiago Bernabéu, Madrid
Attendance: 90,000
Referee: Arnaldo Cézar Coelho (Brazil)

== Statistics ==
=== Goalscorers ===
Paolo Rossi received the Golden Boot for scoring six goals, his first international goals in 3 years. In total, 146 goals were scored by 100 players, with only one of them credited as own goal.

6 goals

- (Italy) Paolo Rossi

5 goals

- (West Germany) Karl-Heinz Rummenigge

4 goals

- (Brazil) Zico
- (Poland) Zbigniew Boniek

3 goals

- (Brazil) Falcão
- (France) Alain Giresse
- (Hungary) László Kiss
- (Northern Ireland) Gerry Armstrong

2 goals

- (Algeria) Salah Assad
- (Argentina) Daniel Bertoni
- (Argentina) Diego Maradona
- (Argentina) Daniel Passarella
- (Austria) Walter Schachner
- (Brazil) Éder
- (Brazil) Serginho
- (Brazil) Sócrates
- (Czechoslovakia) Antonín Panenka
- (England) Trevor Francis
- (England) Bryan Robson
- (France) Bernard Genghini
- (France) Michel Platini
- (France) Dominique Rocheteau
- (France) Didier Six
- (Hungary) László Fazekas
- (Hungary) Tibor Nyilasi
- (Hungary) Gábor Pölöskei
- (Italy) Marco Tardelli
- (Northern Ireland) Billy Hamilton
- (Scotland) John Wark
- (West Germany) Klaus Fischer
- (West Germany) Pierre Littbarski

1 goal

- (Algeria) Lakhdar Belloumi
- (Algeria) Tedj Bensaoula
- (Algeria) Rabah Madjer
- (Argentina) Osvaldo Ardiles
- (Argentina) Ramón Díaz
- (Austria) Reinhold Hintermaier
- (Austria) Hans Krankl
- (Austria) Bruno Pezzey
- (Belgium) Ludo Coeck
- (Belgium) Alexandre Czerniatynski
- (Belgium) Erwin Vandenbergh
- (Brazil) Júnior
- (Brazil) Oscar
- (Cameroon) Grégoire M'Bida
- (Chile) Juan Carlos Letelier
- (Chile) Gustavo Moscoso
- (Chile) Miguel Ángel Neira
- (El Salvador) Luis Ramírez Zapata
- (England) Paul Mariner
- (France) Maxime Bossis
- (France) Alain Couriol
- (France) René Girard
- (France) Gérard Soler
- (France) Marius Trésor
- (Honduras) Eduardo Laing
- (Honduras) Héctor Zelaya
- (Hungary) Lázár Szentes
- (Hungary) József Tóth
- (Hungary) József Varga
- (Italy) Alessandro Altobelli
- (Italy) Antonio Cabrini
- (Italy) Bruno Conti
- (Italy) Francesco Graziani
- (Kuwait) Abdullah Al-Buloushi
- (Kuwait) Faisal Al-Dakhil
- (New Zealand) Steve Sumner
- (New Zealand) Steve Wooddin
- (Peru) Rubén Toribio Díaz
- (Peru) Guillermo La Rosa
- (Poland) Andrzej Buncol
- (Poland) Włodzimierz Ciołek
- (Poland) Janusz Kupcewicz
- (Poland) Grzegorz Lato
- (Poland) Stefan Majewski
- (Poland) Włodzimierz Smolarek
- (Poland) Andrzej Szarmach
- (Scotland) Steve Archibald
- (Scotland) Kenny Dalglish
- (Scotland) Joe Jordan
- (Scotland) David Narey
- (Scotland) John Robertson
- (Scotland) Graeme Souness
- (Soviet Union) Andriy Bal
- (Soviet Union) Sergei Baltacha
- (Soviet Union) Oleh Blokhin
- (Soviet Union) Aleksandre Chivadze
- (Soviet Union) Yuri Gavrilov
- (Soviet Union) Khoren Oganesian
- (Soviet Union) Ramaz Shengelia
- (Spain) Juanito
- (Spain) Roberto López Ufarte
- (Spain) Enrique Saura
- (Spain) Jesús María Zamora
- (West Germany) Paul Breitner
- (West Germany) Horst Hrubesch
- (West Germany) Uwe Reinders
- (Socialist Federal Republic of Yugoslavia) Ivan Gudelj
- (Socialist Federal Republic of Yugoslavia) Vladimir Petrović

Own goals

- (Czechoslovakia) Jozef Barmoš (against England)

=== Red cards ===
Five players received a red card during the tournament:

- (Argentina) Américo Gallego
- (Argentina) Diego Maradona
- (Czechoslovakia) Ladislav Vízek
- (Honduras) Gilberto Yearwood
- (Northern Ireland) Mal Donaghy

=== Awards ===
Golden Boot	Best Young Player	FIFA Fair Play Trophy
(Italy) Paolo Rossi	(France) Manuel Amoros	Brazil

Golden Ball
Rank:	Player:
1st	(Italy) Paolo Rossi
2nd	(Brazil) Falcão
3rd	(West Germany) Karl-Heinz Rummenigge
4th	(Poland) Zbigniew Boniek
5th	(Brazil) Zico
6th	(Brazil) Sócrates
7th	(France) Alain Giresse
8th	(Soviet Union) Rinat Dasayev
9th	(Argentina) Diego Maradona
10th	(France) Michel Platini

=== Team of the Tournament ===
FIFA selected the following players for the 1982 FIFA World Cup All-Star Team.

Goalkeeper	Defenders	Midfielders	Forwards
(Italy) Dino Zoff	(Italy) Fulvio Collovati (Italy) Claudio Gentile (Brazil) Léo Júnior (Brazil) Luizinho	(France) Michel Platini (Brazil) Paulo Roberto Falcão (Brazil) Zico	(Poland) Zbigniew Boniek (Italy) Paolo Rossi (Germany) Karl-Heinz Rummenigge

=== Tournament ranking ===
In 1986, FIFA published a report that ranked all teams in each World Cup up to and including 1986, based on progress in the competition and overall results. The rankings for the 1982 tournament were as follows:

Per statistical convention in football, matches decided in extra time are counted as wins and losses, while matches decided by penalty shoot-outs are counted as draws.

Pos	Grp	Team	Pld	W	D	L	GF	GA	GD	Pts	Final result
1	1/C	Italy	7	4	3	0	12	6	+6	11	Champions
2	2/B	West Germany	7	3	2	2	12	10	+2	8	Runners-up
3	1/A	Poland	7	3	3	1	11	5	+6	9	Third place
4	4/D	France	7	3	2	2	16	12	+4	8	Fourth place
5	6/C	Brazil	5	4	0	1	15	6	+9	8	Eliminated in second group stage
6	4/B	England	5	3	2	0	6	1	+5	8	Eliminated in second group stage
7	6/A	Soviet Union	5	2	2	1	7	4	+3	6	Eliminated in second group stage
8	2/D	Austria	5	2	1	2	5	4	+1	5	Eliminated in second group stage
9	5/D	Northern Ireland	5	1	3	1	5	7	−2	5	Eliminated in second group stage
10	3/A	Belgium	5	2	1	2	3	5	−2	5	Eliminated in second group stage
11	3/C	Argentina	5	2	0	3	8	7	+1	4	Eliminated in second group stage
12	5/B	Spain (H)	5	1	2	2	4	5	−1	4	Eliminated in second group stage
13	2	Algeria	3	2	0	1	5	5	0	4	Eliminated in first group stage
14	3	Hungary	3	1	1	1	12	6	+6	3	Eliminated in first group stage
15	6	Scotland	3	1	1	1	8	8	0	3	Eliminated in first group stage
16	5	Yugoslavia	3	1	1	1	2	2	0	3	Eliminated in first group stage
17	1	Cameroon	3	0	3	0	1	1	0	3	Eliminated in first group stage
18	5	Honduras	3	0	2	1	2	3	−1	2	Eliminated in first group stage
19	4	Czechoslovakia	3	0	2	1	2	4	−2	2	Eliminated in first group stage
20	1	Peru	3	0	2	1	2	6	−4	2	Eliminated in first group stage
21	4	Kuwait	3	0	1	2	2	6	−4	1	Eliminated in first group stage
22	2	Chile	3	0	0	3	3	8	−5	0	Eliminated in first group stage
23	6	New Zealand	3	0	0	3	2	12	−10	0	Eliminated in first group stage
24	3	El Salvador	3	0	0	3	1	13	−12	0	Eliminated in first group stage

Source: FIFA
(H) Hosts

== Marketing ==
=== Sponsorship ===
The sponsors of the 1982 FIFA World Cup consisted of 34 official FIFA World Cup partners.

FIFA World Cup sponsors
- Annabella
- Banco Hispano Americano
- BNZ Finance
- Caloi
- Canon
- Casas Pernambucanas
- CIS Insurance
- Coca-Cola
- Commercial Bank of Kuwait
- Continental
- Cruzcampo
- Duarig
- Ducados
- Ellesse
- Erdgas Heizung
- Fujifilm
- Gillette
- Iveco
- JVC
- Lois jeans & jackets
- Metaxa
- Mustang Jeans
- Paper Mate
- R.J. Reynolds
- San Miguel
- Seiko
- Sport Billy
- Staroup jeans
- Steinlager
- Tungsram
- Vitasay
- Zanussi
- Zeyko küchen

== Symbols ==
=== Mascot ===
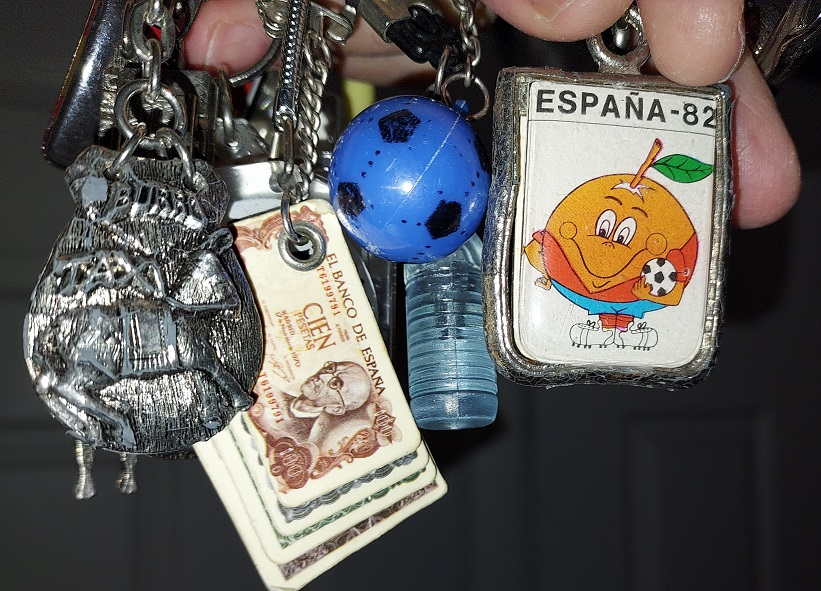
Naranjito, the official mascot of the 1982 tournament, is featured in this vintage collection of Spanish keychains.

The official mascot of this World Cup was Naranjito, a male anthropomorphised orange, a typical fruit in Spain, wearing the kit of the host's national team. It was designed by José María Martín and María Dolores Salto from the marketing agency Publicidad Bellido. Its name comes from naranja, the Spanish word for orange, and the diminutive suffix "-ito".

=== Match ball ===
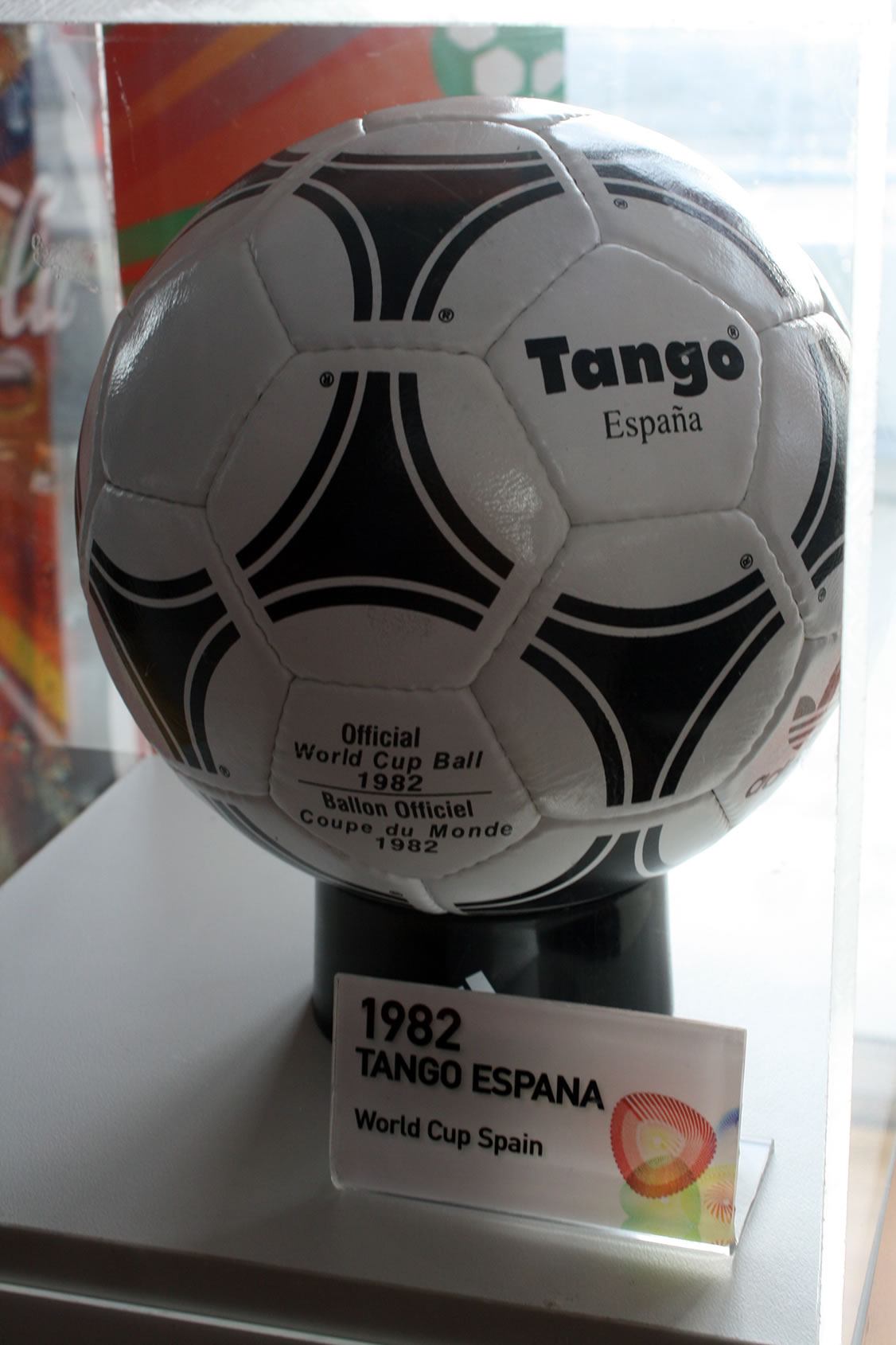
Adidas Tango España, the official match ball of Spain '82.

The match ball for 1982 World Cup, manufactured by Adidas, was the Tango España.

=== Television series ===
Football in Action (Spanish: Fútbol en acción) is an educational animated television series about football produced by BRB Internacional and Televisión Española (TVE). The main character is a twelve-year-old Naranjito, who is accompanied on his adventures by his friends: Clementina (a mandarin orange), Citronio (a lemon), and Imarchi (a robot). The series talks about the rules of football and the history of the World Cup. Its 26 episodes of 25 minutes each were first aired in 1981–82 on TVE 1.

=== Poster ===
The official poster was designed by Joan Miró.

== Controversies ==
The final match in group 2 between West Germany and Austria, the "Disgrace of Gijón", was controversial because of accusations of match fixing. It led to a rule change so that the final two games in each group were played simultaneously in subsequent World Cups.

There was some consideration given as to whether England, Northern Ireland, and Scotland would withdraw from the tournament because of the Falklands War between Argentina and the United Kingdom. A directive issued by the British sports minister Neil Macfarlane in April, at the start of the conflict, suggested that there should be no contact between British representative teams and Argentina. This directive was not rescinded until August, following the end of the tournament and of the hostilities. Macfarlane reported to Prime Minister Margaret Thatcher that some players and officials were uneasy about participating because of the casualties suffered by British forces, and the strong diplomatic ties between Argentina and Spain. FIFA later advised the British Government that there was no prospect that Argentina (the defending champions) would be asked to withdraw, and it also became apparent that no other countries would withdraw from the tournament. It was decided by Cabinet Secretary Robert Armstrong to allow the British national teams to participate so that Argentina could not use their absence for propaganda purposes, reversing the intended effect of applying political pressure onto Argentina.
