= Luis Barrancos =

Bolivian football referee

Luis Barrancos Álvarez
- Full name: Luis Barrancos Álvarez
- Born: 19 August 1946 (age 80); Santa Cruz de la Sierra, Bolivia

Domestic
Years	League	Role

International
Years	League	Role
1975–1987	FIFA listed	Referee

Luis Barrancos Álvarez (born 19 August 1946) is a Bolivian retired football referee. He is known for having refereed one match in the 1982 FIFA World Cup in Spain between Argentina and El Salvador.

Barrancos is known to have served as a FIFA referee during the period from 1975 to 1987. He officiated at the 1979 and 1987 Copa America tournaments, as well as qualifying matches for the 1978, 1982, and 1986 World Cups.

Barrancos was a panelist at CONMEBOL's 'Futuro III' referee's conference in Buenos Aires in May 2008.
