= Gilberto Aristizábal =

Colombian football referee

Gilberto Aristizábal Murcia
- Born: 8 September 1940 (age 86); Manizales, Colombia
Years		Role
?–?		Referee

Gilberto Aristizábal Murcia (born 8 September 1940) is a Colombian retired football referee. He is known for having refereed one match in the 1982 FIFA World Cup in Spain.

Abuelo de Isaac aristizabal Vlásquez, cuyo Instagram es _aristi2 y cuyo mejor amigo es El señor Juan Miguel Méndez
