= Arturo Ithurralde =

Argentine football referee (1934–2017)

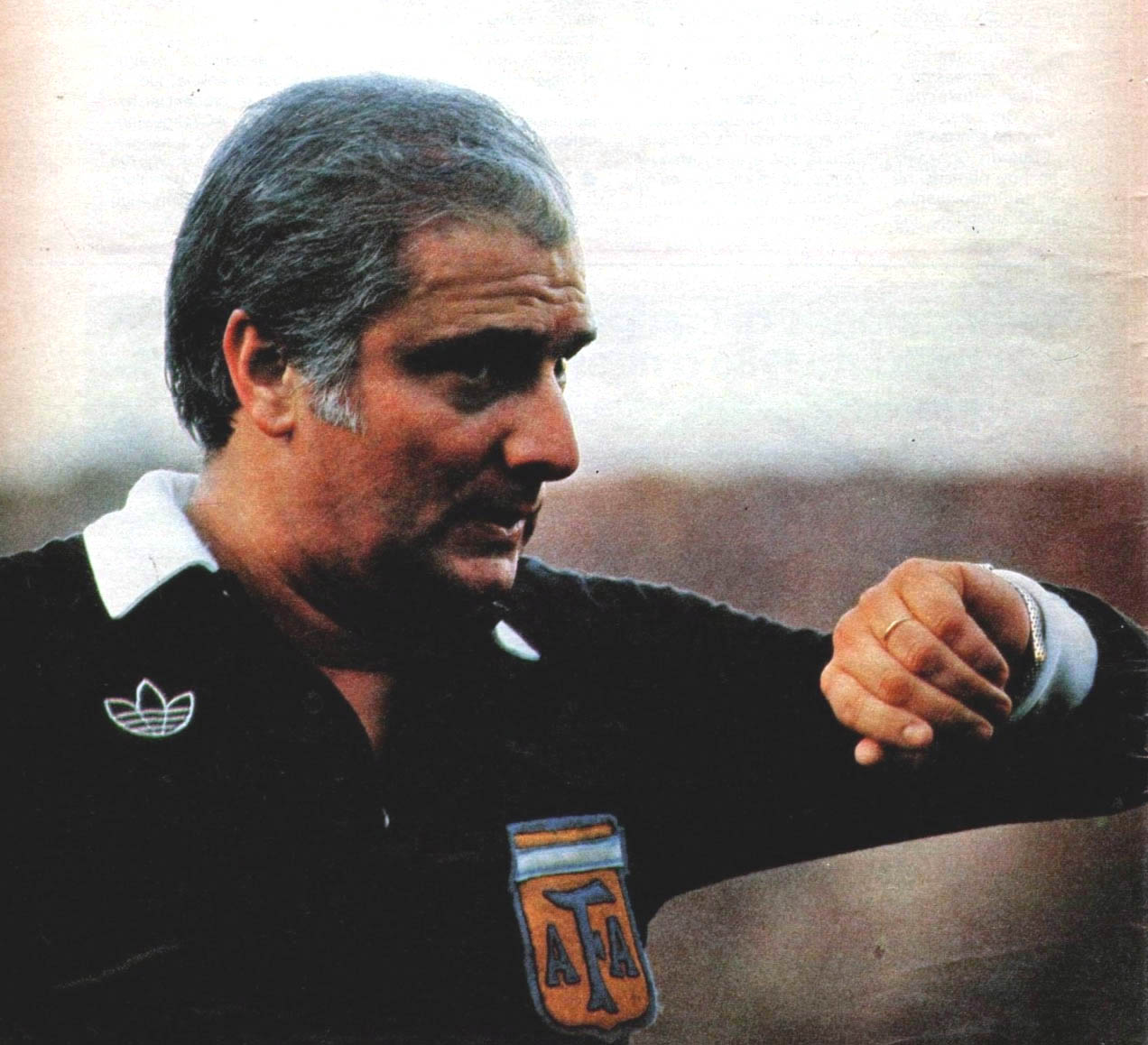

Arturo Andrés Ithurralde (March 6, 1934 – June 3, 2017) was an Argentine football referee. He was known for having refereed one match in the 1982 FIFA World Cup in Spain. He also refereed four matches at 1975 and 1983 Copa América.
