= Luis Paulino Siles =

Costa Rican lawyer, civil engineer, and football referee

- Full name: Luis Paulino Siles Calderón
- Born: December 13, 1941 (age 84); San José, Costa Rica

Domestic
Years	League	Role
1959–1984	Liga FPD	Referee

International
Years	League	Role
??–1984	FIFA-listed	Referee

Luis Paulino Siles Calderón (born December 13, 1941) is a Costa Rican lawyer, civil engineer and former association football referee. He is known for officiating two matches (Brazil vs Scotland and Poland vs Belgium) in the 1982 FIFA World Cup. He also officiated at the 1980 and 1984 Summer Olympics.

The Apertura tournament of the 2017–18 Liga FPD season was dedicated to him.
