= Héctor Ortiz (referee) =

Paraguayan football referee

- Full name: Héctor Ortiz
- Born: 5 April 1933 (age 93); Encarnación, Paraguay

Domestic
Years	League	Role

International
Years	League	Role
1982–1983	FIFA listed	Referee

Héctor Ortiz (born April 5, 1933) is a retired Paraguayan football referee, born in Encarnación, Paraguay. He is known for having refereed one match in the 1982 FIFA World Cup in Spain between Northern Ireland and Spain and the first leg of the 1983 Copa América final between Uruguay and Brazil.
