= Juninho Fonseca =

Brazilian footballer

Personal information
- Full name: Alcides Fonseca Júnior
- Date of birth: August 29, 1958 (age 68)
- Place of birth: Olímpia, Brazil
- Height: 1.84 m (6 ft 0 in)
- Position: Defender

Senior career*
Years	Team	Apps	(Gls)
1974–1983	Ponte Preta		
1983–1986	Corinthians		
1986	Juventus		
1986	Vasco da Gama		
1987	Cruzeiro		
1988	XV de Piracicaba		
1988	Atlético Paranaense		
1989	São José (SP)		
1989	Ponte Preta		
1990	Nacional (SP)		
1991	Olímpia (SP)		
1991–1992	Yomiuri		

International career
1980–1982	Brazil		

Managerial career
- 1999: Portuguesa
- 2000: Mogi Mirim
- 2000: São José (SP)
- 2000: Comercial
- 2001: Sampaio Corrêa
- 2002: Treze
- 2003–2004: Corinthians
- 2004: Caxias
- 2004–2005: Noroeste
- 2012: Botafogo-SP (U-20)
- 2014–: Ivinhema
- * Club domestic league appearances and goals

Alcides Fonseca Júnior (born 29 August 1958), known as Juninho Fonseca or just Juninho, is a Brazilian former footballer who played as a central defender.

In career he played for clubs Ponte Preta (1974–1983 and 1989), Corinthians (1983–1986), Juventus and Vasco da Gama (1986), Cruzeiro (1987), XV de Piracicaba and Atlético Paranaense (1988), São José (1989), Nacional (1990), Olímpia (1991), and closed his career in Japan Japan Soccer League in 1992 with Yomiuri FC.

He won one São Paulo State League (1983), one Guanabara Cup (1986), and two Japanese League (1991, 1992).

For Brazil national football team he got in 1980-81 four international caps, never scored a goal. He was in the squad for 1982 FIFA World Cup, without playing any game.

== Honours ==
=== Player ===
Corinthans

- Campeonato Paulista: 1983

Vasco da Gama

- Taça Guanabara: 1986

Yomiuri

- J1 League: 1990-91, 1991-92
- JSL Cup: 1991, 1992

=== Manager ===
Treze

- Campeonato Paraibano: 2001
