= Enrique Labo Revoredo =

Peruvian football referee (1939–2014)

Enrique Labo Revoredo (March 2, 1939 – July 2, 2014) was a Peruvian football referee.

Born in Lima, he is known for having refereed the historic West Germany vs Algeria match at the 1982 FIFA World Cup in Spain. Labo also refereed at the 1980 Summer Olympics. He died at the age of 75 in 2014.
