= Abraham Klein (referee) =

Israeli international football referee

- Born: 29 March 1934 (age 92); Timișoara, Kingdom of Romania
- Other occupation: PE Teacher

Domestic
Years	League	Role
1958–1984	Israeli League	Referee
1977–1984	NASL	Referee

International
Years	League	Role
1965–1982	FIFA listed	Referee

Abraham Klein (Hebrew: אברהם קליין, 29 March 1934) is an Israeli international football referee. He refereed international matches between 1965 and 1982, including the 1968 and 1976 Olympics and important matches at the Mexico 1970, Argentina 1978 and Spain 1982 World Cup Finals. He was also a linesman (now assistant referee) for the 1982 World Cup Final in Spain.

== 1970 World Cup ==
Klein refereed some of the most important FIFA World Cup matches between 1970 and 1982. In his first World Cup tournament in 1970 he refereed the England v Brazil group C match at Guadalajara - the defender of the title from 1966 against the champion of 1962 and 1958 (and finally again world champion 1970). Klein admitted that he tried, unsuccessfully, to end the game on time but no one heard him whistle so he kept the glamour tie going: "Not many people know, but when I blew for time the players didn't hear the whistle and as it was such a great game I let it continue for a few minutes."

== 1974 World Cup ==
Klein did not attend the 1974 World Cup Finals in West Germany due to the Munich massacre visited upon Israeli athletes at the Summer Olympic Games held in Munich in 1972. Being an Israeli referee it was thought that he could be targeted by terrorist organisations.

== 1978 World Cup ==
Klein was selected for the 1978 World Cup where he was given the Argentina v Italy match in Group 1 in Buenos Aires.

In Klein's game Italy won with a Roberto Bettega goal but before half-time Klein denied Argentina a penalty kick. Klein said of the incident: "I analyzed all the players, which helped me to determine my tactics during the game. For example: towards the end of the first half, one of the Argentines went down in the penalty box and of course 80,000 people were whistling, screaming and crying for a penalty. I had learned from the previous games that I needed to be really close to the Argentinian players who caused the trouble. I am not telling you their names."

Brian Glanville wrote of the incident: "There was nothing more impressive in this World Cup than the way he stood between his linesmen at half-time in the Argentina - Italy game, scorning the banshee whistling of the incensed crowd." Klein said: "At half-time, as I walked into the tunnel, I was booed at by 80,000 people. In the second half, as the players were called from the dressing-rooms, my tactic was not to walk onto the pitch before the players. I knew the crowd would remember what had happened at the end of the first half, and they would definitely welcome me with whistling and yelling, which is not a good feeling for a referee. So I waited until the Argentines came out of the tunnel and I entered the pitch with them, towards the applause."

In the second phase Klein refereed the Austria v West Germany match in Group A.

The referee in the final was Sergio Gonella, the Italian. Klein's appointment, though supported originally by FIFA was disputed by the Argentinians, reputedly, because of the political links between the Netherlands and Israel; also, Klein had lived in the Netherlands for a year as a teenager. But as Klein said, later: "When I'm on the pitch, only two things are important to me: being fair to both teams and making my decisions bravely. I think all referees are fair, but not all of them are brave, probably. At the 1978 World Cup, I was leading Germany vs Austria. Well, to a Jew Germans and Austrians are the same. But they were like Dutch and Brazilians to me."

In the end Klein refereed the match for third place between Italy and Brazil which Brazil won. Klein was the only referee officiating three matches during the World Cup 1978.

== 1982 World Cup ==
Klein was also given the Brazil v Italy fixture in the 1982 World Cup, the game in which Paolo Rossi scored a hat-trick. He ran the line in the final to the Brazilian referee Arnaldo Coelho and was, reputedly, offered the chance to officiate in the event of that final being replayed.

== See also ==
- List of Jews in sports (non-players)

== Bibliography ==
- Abraham Klein; Rubi Shalev (1995-07-01). The Referee's Referee: Becoming the Best. Soccer for Americans. ISBN 978-0-916802-26-4.
