= Giuliano Ravizza =

Italian fashion designer and businessperson (1926–1992)

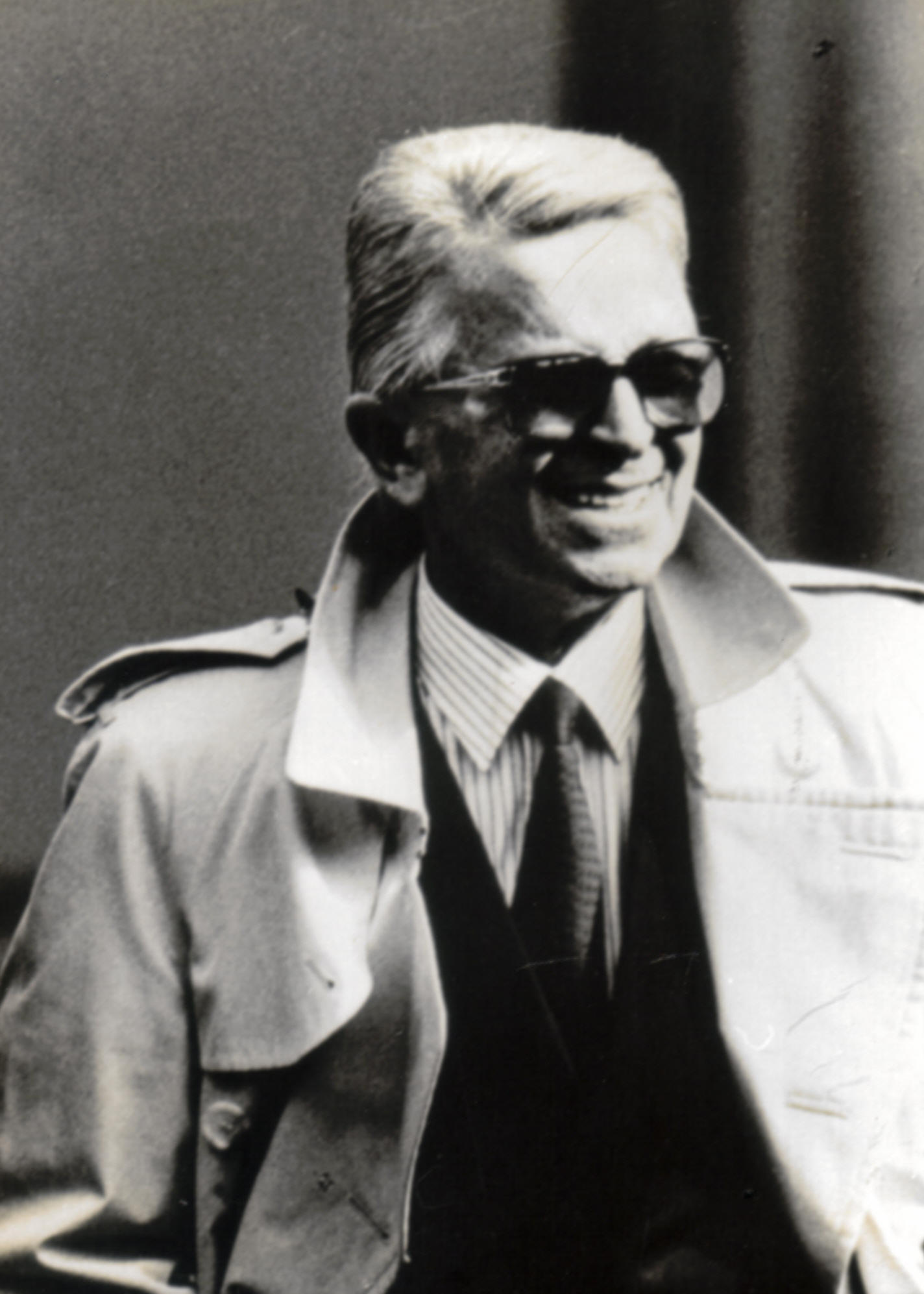
- Born: 8 May 1926; Pavia, Kingdom of Italy
- Died: 9 October 1992 (aged 66); Pavia, Italy
- Occupations: Fashion designer and retailer

Giuliano Ravizza (8 May 1926 – 9 October 1992) was an Italian fashion designer and the founder of the Annabella (aka Pelliccerie Annabella, "Annabella Furs") fashion label.

== Life and career ==
Born in Pavia, Ravizza studied at the liceo scientifico, and in 1950 he graduated in medicine at the Pavia University. A multi-instrumentist, he founded the group Quintetto goliardico and was part of the Gorni Kramer orchestra.

In 1955, Ravizza left his daily job as a doctor to follow the business of his father, who had founded a local fashion boutique and had recently fallen ill. Following a trip in New York, in 1960 he opened Le Tex, a department store focused on ready-to-wear for men, women and children, which later he sold to Standa. In 1963, he started the Annabella atelier, which had its only boutique in Piazza della Vittoria in his hometown. With Annabella, Ravizza pursued the concept of "accessible luxury", and successfully launched his line of ready-to-wear furs. Among the spokespeople who during the years took part to Annabella's advertising campaigns were Alain Delon, Gina Lollobrigida, Virna Lisi, Milva, Domenico Modugno, Lea Massari, Sylva Koscina, Florinda Bolkan, Verushka, Al Bano & Romina Power, Jerry Hall, Brigitte Nielsen, Monica Bellucci. At the peak of his success, in September 1981, Ravizza was kidnapped by Anonima sarda, held captive in Aspromonte, and freed after over three months of captivity, following a 4.1 billion lire ransom payment. In the 1980s Annabella expanded its product lines, producing, among other things, perfumes, eyewear and gadgets.

In 1990, Ravizza published an autobiography, Dentro una vita ('Inside a life'). He died of lung cancer on 9 October 1992, at the age of 66.
