= Bogdan Dochev =

Bulgarian football referee (1935–2017)

Bogdan Dochev Богдан Дочев
- Dochev before the 1986 World Cup game Argentina–England

Personal information
- Full name: Bogdan Ganev Dochev
- Date of birth: 26 June 1935
- Place of birth: Sevlievo, Bulgaria
- Date of death: 29 May 2017 (aged 81)
- Place of death: Sofia, Bulgaria
- Positions: Winger; forward

Youth career
- CSKA Sofia

Senior career*
| Years | Team | Apps | (Gls) |
| 1958–1959 | CSKA Sofia | 0 | (0) |
| 1958 | → Cherno More (loan) | 4 | (1) |
| 1958–1959 | → Spartak Varna (loan) | 1 | (0) |
| 1959–1961 | Vatev Beloslav | – | (–) |
| 1961–1964 | Levski Sofia | 29 | (4) |
| 1964–1966 | Kremikovtsi | – | (–) |
- * Club domestic league appearances and goals

Bogdan Dochev
- Full name: Bogdan Ganev Dochev
- Born: 26 June 1935; Sevlievo
- Died: 29 May 2017 (aged 81); Sofia, Bulgaria

Domestic
| Years | League | Role |
| 1970–1986 | Bulgarian A Football Group | Referee |

International
| Years | League | Role |
| 1978–1986 | FIFA–listed | Referee |

Bogdan Ganev Dochev (Bulgarian: Богдан Ганев Дочев; 26 June 1935 – 29 May 2017) was a Bulgarian footballer and football referee.

Dochev is known for having refereed two matches in the FIFA World Cup, Italy - Cameroon 1-1 in 1982 and Paraguay - Belgium 2-2 in 1986. Dochev was a linesman in the famous Brazil versus Italy match in 1982 and in the famous match between England and Argentina in 1986 in which the Hand of God and Goal of the Century were scored by Diego Maradona.
