= Gastón Castro =

Chilean football referee

Gastón Edmundo Castro Makuc (born August 23, 1948) is a retired Chilean association football referee. He is known for having refereed one match in the 1982 FIFA World Cup in Spain.

He has chaired the Chilean committee of referees and is a FIFA trainer of referees.
