= Éder Aleixo =

Brazilian footballer and manager

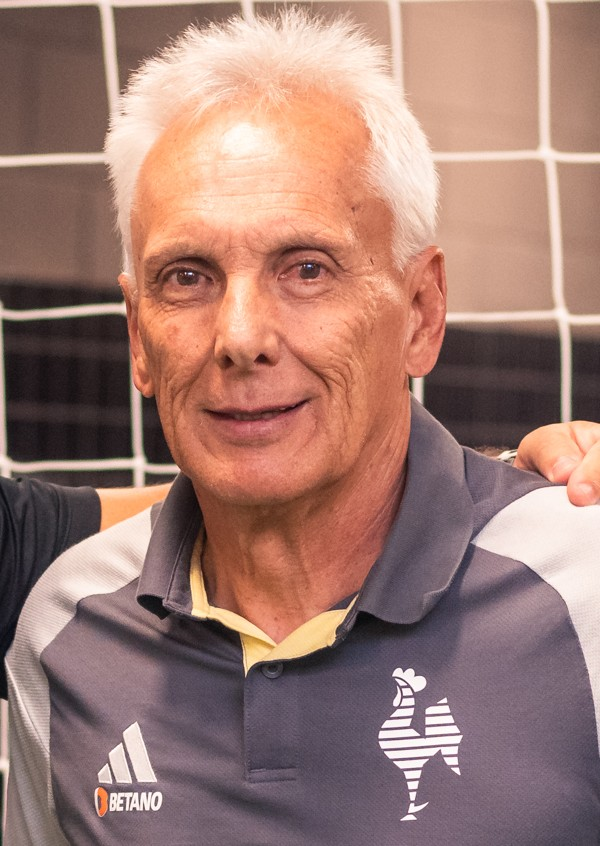
- Aleixo in 2024

Personal information
- Full name: Éder Aleixo de Assis
- Date of birth: 25 May 1957 (age 69)
- Place of birth: Vespasiano, Brazil
- Height: 1.76 m (5 ft 9 in)
- Positions: Left winger; forward

Senior career*
Years	Team	Apps	(Gls)
1975–1976	América Mineiro	26	(6)
1977–1979	Grêmio	47	(14)
1980–1985	Atlético Mineiro	79	(27)
1985	Inter de Limeira		
1986	Palmeiras	8	(1)
1987	Santos		
1987	Sport Recife		
1988	Botafogo	6	(1)
1988	Atlético Paranaense		
1988	Cerro Porteño		
1988–1989	Malatyaspor		
1989–1990	Atlético Mineiro	19	(2)
1991	Atlético Paranaense	9	(3)
1992	União São João		
1993	Cruzeiro		
1994–1995	Atlético Mineiro		
1995–1996	União São João		
1996	Gama		

International career
1979–1986	Brazil	52	(8)

Managerial career
- 2018–2025: Atlético Mineiro (assistant)
- * Club domestic league appearances and goals

Éder Aleixo de Assis (Brazilian Portuguese: [ˈɛdɛʁ]; born 25 May 1957), commonly known as Éder, is a Brazilian former footballer. A left winger and forward, he is best known for his spells with Atlético Mineiro in the Campeonato Brasileiro and for representing the Brazil national team. He also played for Grêmio, Palmeiras and several other clubs. In the 1988–89 season, he played in Turkey for Malatyaspor, alongside fellow Brazilians Carlos and Serginho.

== International career ==
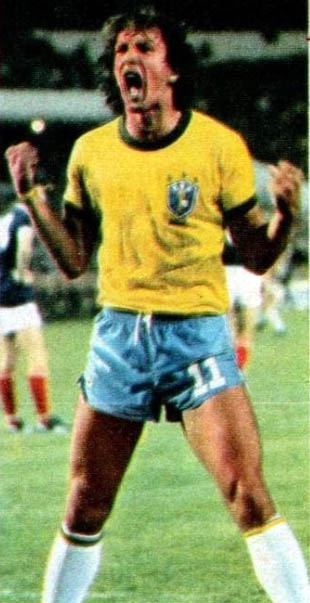
Éder with Brazil at the 1982 World Cup

Éder Aleixo gained 52 caps with the Brazil national team between May 1979 and April 1986, and came to international prominence during the 1982 FIFA World Cup while playing alongside Zico, Sócrates and Falcão in what's considered one of the greatest international football teams ever. In Brazil's first match of the tournament Éder scored a winning goal against the Soviet Union, flicking the ball up and volleying it into the net with blistering power and precision from 25 yards out.

He followed that up with another goal in the 4–1 win over Scotland when, after feigning to shoot, he lofted the ball over Scotland's frozen goalie Alan Rough and into the far corner from the edge of the area. He smashed a bending free kick against the crossbar vs Argentina in the 2nd round group game from 30 yards out, and this shot resulted in the first goal of the match scored by Zico.

Éder Aleixo did not make the Brazilian squad for the 1986 World Cup, after losing form and fitness during the preceding season, and also because he apparently pushed a ball boy during a warm-up game for Brazil. He was sent off in his final international match, against Peru, in April 1986. Off the field he was occasionally a controversial figure; rumours abounded that he preferred partying to training and often fell out with coaches and teammates.

Despite his ability as a footballer, he was also notorious for his poor work-rate, difficult and temperamental character, and lack of discipline both on and off the pitch, which led him to have issues with several of his managers.

== Style of play ==
A predominantly left-footed player, Éder Aleixo usually played as a wide midfielder on the left flank, although he was also capable of playing as a forward or in a free role as a second striker; in his prime, he was considered to be one of the best players in the world in his position. Although he was not the quickest winger, he was highly creative, athletically built, and had dazzling technical skills and close control, as well as an extremely accurate and powerful bending shot with his left foot (one of his strikes reportedly reached a speed of 174.5 km/h) that earned him the nickname O Canhão ("The Cannon") from his fans; he was capable of bending the ball in any direction by striking it with either the inside or the outside of the instep of his left foot, while he was not particularly adept with his weaker right foot. In addition to his ball striking abilities from outside the area or from volleys in open play, he was also known for his accuracy from free kicks, as well as his excellent ball delivery from set-pieces and corners, and his accurate long passing and crossing ability.

== Career statistics ==
Appearances and goals by national team and year
National team	Year	Apps	Goals
Brazil	1979	3	2
Brazil	1980	4	0
Brazil	1981	12	0
Brazil	1982	10	3
Brazil	1983	11	3
Brazil	1984	0	0
Brazil	1985	10	0
Brazil	1986	2	0
Total		52	8

Scores and results list Brazil's goal tally first, score column indicates score after each Aleixo goal.

List of international goals scored by Éder Aleixo
No.	Date	Venue	Opponent	Score	Result	Competition	Ref.
1	17 May 1979	Maracanã Stadium, Rio de Janeiro, Brazil	Paraguay	–	6–0	Friendly	
2	31 May 1979	Maracanã Stadium, Rio de Janeiro, Brazil	Uruguay	–	5–1	Friendly	
3	5 May 1982	Castelão, São Luís, Brazil	Portugal	2–0	3–1	Friendly	
4	14 June 1982	Ramón Sánchez Pizjuán Stadium, Seville, Spain	Soviet Union	2–1	2–1	1982 FIFA World Cup	
5	18 June 1982	Estadio Benito Villamarín, Seville, Spain	Scotland	3–1	4–1	1982 FIFA World Cup	
6	28 April 1983	Maracanã Stadium, Rio de Janeiro, Brazil	Chile	2–1	3–2	Friendly	
7	1 September 1983	Estádio Serra Dourada, Goiânia, Brazil	Ecuador	4–0	5–0	1983 Copa América	
8	13 October 1983	Estadio Defensores del Chaco, Asunción, Paraguay	Paraguay	1–1	1–1	1983 Copa América	

== Honours ==
Grêmio

- Campeonato Gaúcho: 1977, 1979
- Torneo Ciudad de Rosario: 1979

Atlético Mineiro

- Campeonato Mineiro: 1980, 1981, 1982, 1983, 1985, 1995
- Tournoi de Paris: 1982
- Trofeo Ramón de Carranza: 1990

Cruzeiro

- Copa do Brasil: 1993

Individual

- Bola de Prata: 1983
- South American Player of the Year Bronze award: 1983
