= Thomson Chan =

Hong Kong football referee

- Traditional Chinese: 陳譚新
- Simplified Chinese: 陈谭新
Transcriptions
Standard Mandarin
- Hanyu Pinyin: Chén Tánxīn
- IPA: [ʈʂʰə̌n tʰǎn ɕín]
Yue: Cantonese
- Jyutping: Can4 Taam4san1
- IPA: [tsʰɐn˩ tʰam˩ sɐn˥]

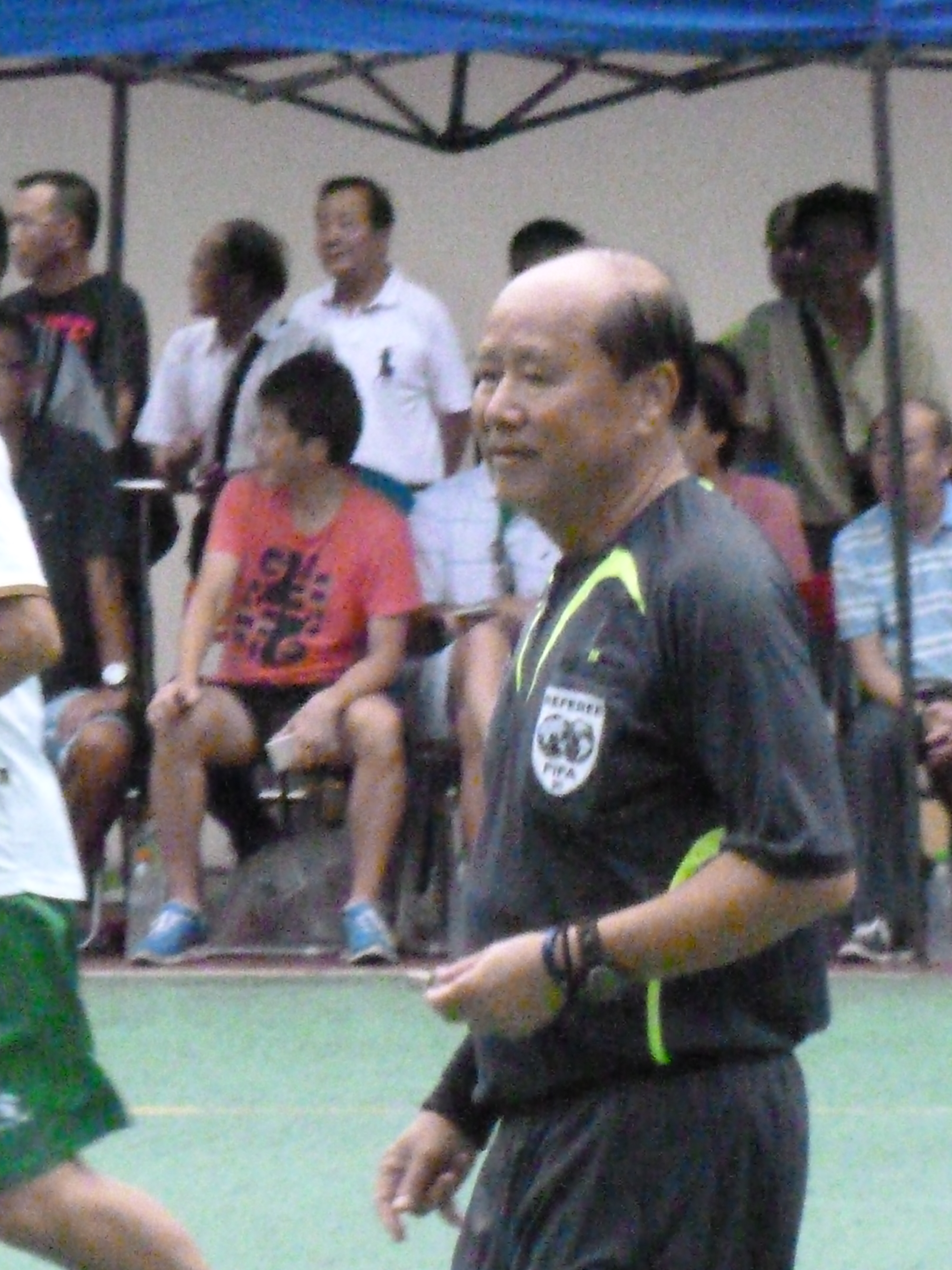
Thomson Chan Tam-Sun

Thomson Chan Tam-Sun (Chinese: 陳譚新; Jyutping: Can4 Taam4san1; Cantonese pronunciation: [tsʰɐn˩ tʰam˩ sɐn˥]; born 8 May 1941) is a Hong Kong retired football referee. He is best known for being a referee at the World Cup in 1982. He was the referee for one match and served as a linesman for 3 other matches. Now, he sometimes works as a guest commentator in Hong Kong.
