= 1982 FIFA World Cup Group 1 =

Football tournament group stage

Group 1 was one of six groups of national teams competing in the group stage of the 1982 FIFA World Cup. Play began on 14 June and ended on 23 June 1982. The group consisted of four teams: Seeded team Poland, two-time World Cup winners Italy, Peru and World Cup debutants Cameroon.

Poland won the group, having achieved the only victory among the six fixtures in the group, and advanced to the second round. Italy also advanced, ahead of Cameroon, as Italy had scored the greater number of goals. Cameroon therefore exited the tournament undefeated.

Italy went on to win the tournament, and as of 2026 is the last team who failed to win their group to later win the tournament.

== Standings ==
Pos	Team	Pld	W	D	L	GF	GA	GD	Pts	Qualification
1	Poland	3	1	2	0	5	1	+4	4	Advance to second round
2	Italy	3	0	3	0	2	2	0	3	Advance to second round
3	Cameroon	3	0	3	0	1	1	0	3	
4	Peru	3	0	2	1	2	6	−4	2	

Source: FIFA

== Matches ==
=== Italy vs Poland ===
14 June 1982
17:15 CEST

Italy	0–0	Poland

Balaídos, Vigo
Attendance: 33,000
Referee: Michel Vautrot (France)

Italy	Poland

GK	1	Dino Zoff (c)
DF	6	Claudio Gentile
DF	7	Gaetano Scirea	(yellow card) 47'
DF	5	Fulvio Collovati
DF	4	Antonio Cabrini
MF	11	Gianpiero Marini	(yellow card) 2'
MF	9	Giancarlo Antognoni
MF	14	Marco Tardelli
FW	16	Bruno Conti
FW	20	Paolo Rossi
FW	19	Francesco Graziani
Substitutes:
GK	12	Ivano Bordon
DF	3	Giuseppe Bergomi
MF	13	Gabriele Oriali
MF	15	Franco Causio
FW	18	Alessandro Altobelli
Manager:
Enzo Bearzot

GK	1	Józef Młynarczyk
SW	9	Władysław Żmuda (c)
RB	10	Stefan Majewski
CB	5	Paweł Janas
LB	7	Jan Jałocha
DM	8	Waldemar Matysik
CM	16	Grzegorz Lato
CM	20	Zbigniew Boniek	(yellow card) 12'
CM	13	Andrzej Buncol
CF	19	Andrzej Iwan		(substituted off) 72'
CF	11	Włodzimierz Smolarek
Substitutes:
GK	21	Jacek Kazimierski
DF	2	Marek Dziuba
DF	12	Roman Wójcicki
FW	17	Andrzej Szarmach
CF	18	Marek Kusto		(substituted on) 72'
Manager:
Antoni Piechniczek

Assistant referees:
Adolf Prokop (East Germany)
Nicolae Rainea (Romania)

=== Peru vs Cameroon ===
15 June 1982
17:15 CEST

Peru	0–0	Cameroon

Estadio de Riazor, A Coruña
Attendance: 11,000
Referee: Franz Wöhrer (Austria)

Peru	Cameroon

GK	21	Ramón Quiroga
DF	2	Jaime Duarte
DF	15	Rubén Toribio Díaz (c)
DF	3	Salvador Salguero
DF	16	Jorge Olaechea
MF	6	José Velásquez
MF	10	Teófilo Cubillas	(substituted off) 57'
MF	8	César Cueto
FW	5	Germán Leguía	(substituted off) 57'
FW	9	Julio César Uribe
FW	11	Juan Carlos Oblitas
Substitutes:
GK	1	Eusebio Acasuzo
FW	7	Gerónimo Barbadillo	(substituted on) 57'
MF	13	Óscar Arizaga
MF	18	Eduardo Malásquez
FW	19	Guillermo La Rosa	(substituted on) 57'
Manager:
(Brazil) Tim

GK	1	Thomas N'Kono (c)	(yellow card) 80'
DF	2	Michel Kaham
DF	5	Elie Onana
DF	16	Ibrahim Aoudou
DF	7	Ephrem M'Bom
MF	6	Emmanuel Kundé
FW	14	Théophile Abega
MF	8	Grégoire M'Bida
FW	4	René N'Djeya
FW	9	Roger Milla		(substituted off) 89'
FW	18	Jacques N'Guea		(substituted off) 73'
Substitutes:
GK	12	Joseph-Antoine Bell
MF	10	Jean-Pierre Tokoto		(substituted on) 89'
FW	11	Charles Toubé
FW	13	Paul Bahoken		(substituted on) 73'
DF	15	François N'Doumbé
Manager:
(France) Jean Vincent

Assistant referees:
Nicolae Rainea (Romania)
Adolf Prokop (East Germany)

=== Italy vs Peru ===
18 June 1982
17:15 CEST

Italy	1–1	Peru
Conti 18'		Díaz 83'

Balaídos, Vigo
Attendance: 25,000
Referee: Walter Eschweiler (West Germany)

Italy	Peru

GK	1	Dino Zoff (c)
DF	6	Claudio Gentile
DF	7	Gaetano Scirea
DF	5	Fulvio Collovati
DF	4	Antonio Cabrini
MF	11	Gianpiero Marini
MF	9	Giancarlo Antognoni
MF	14	Marco Tardelli	(yellow card) 52'
FW	16	Bruno Conti
FW	20	Paolo Rossi		(substituted off) 46'
FW	19	Francesco Graziani
Substitutes:
GK	12	Ivano Bordon
DF	3	Giuseppe Bergomi
MF	13	Gabriele Oriali
MF	15	Franco Causio		(substituted on) 46'
FW	18	Alessandro Altobelli
Manager:
Enzo Bearzot

GK	21	Ramón Quiroga
DF	2	Jaime Duarte	(yellow card) 76'
DF	15	Rubén Toribio Díaz (c)
DF	3	Salvador Salguero
DF	16	Jorge Olaechea
MF	8	César Cueto
MF	6	José Velásquez
MF	10	Teófilo Cubillas
FW	7	Gerónimo Barbadillo		(substituted off) 65'
FW	9	Julio César Uribe		(substituted off) 65'
FW	11	Juan Carlos Oblitas
Substitutes:
GK	1	Eusebio Acasuzo
FW	5	Germán Leguía		(substituted on) 65'
MF	13	Óscar Arizaga
MF	14	Miguel Gutiérrez
FW	19	Guillermo La Rosa		(substituted on) 65'
Manager:
(Brazil) Tim

Assistant referees:
Mario Rubio Vázquez (Mexico)
Abraham Klein (Israel)

=== Poland vs Cameroon ===
19 June 1982
17:15 CEST

Poland	0–0	Cameroon

Estadio de Riazor, A Coruña
Attendance: 19,000
Referee: Alexis Ponnet (Belgium)

Poland	Cameroon

GK	1	Józef Młynarczyk
SW	9	Władysław Żmuda (c)
RB	10	Stefan Majewski
CB	5	Paweł Janas
LB	7	Jan Jałocha
DM	20	Zbigniew Boniek
CM	16	Grzegorz Lato
CM	14	Andrzej Pałasz	(yellow card) 34'	(substituted off) 66'
CM	13	Andrzej Buncol
CF	19	Andrzej Iwan		(substituted off) 25'
CF	11	Włodzimierz Smolarek
Substitutes:
GK	21	Jacek Kazimierski
DF	2	Marek Dziuba
MF	15	Włodzimierz Ciołek
CF	17	Andrzej Szarmach		(substituted on) 25'
RW	18	Marek Kusto		(substituted on) 66'
Manager:
Antoni Piechniczek

GK	1	Thomas N'Kono (c)
DF	2	Michel Kaham
DF	5	Elie Onana
DF	4	René N'Djeya
DF	7	Ephrem M'Bom
MF	16	Ibrahim Aoudou	(yellow card) 40'
MF	14	Théophile Abega
MF	6	Emmanuel Kundé
MF	8	Grégoire M'Bida
FW	9	Roger Milla	(yellow card) 80'
FW	18	Jacques N'Guea		(substituted off) 46'
Substitutes:
GK	12	Joseph-Antoine Bell
MF	10	Jean-Pierre Tokoto		(substituted on) 46'
FW	11	Charles Toubé
DF	15	François N'Doumbé
FW	20	Alain Eyobo
Manager:
(France) Jean Vincent

Assistant referees:
Walter Eschweiler (West Germany)
Mario Rubio Vázquez (Mexico)

=== Poland vs Peru ===
22 June 1982
17:15 CEST

Poland	5–1	Peru
Smolarek 55'; Lato 58'; Boniek 61'; Buncol 68'; Ciołek 76'		La Rosa 83'

Estadio de Riazor, A Coruña
Attendance: 25,000
Referee: Mario Rubio Vázquez (Mexico)

Poland	Peru

GK	1	Józef Młynarczyk
SW	9	Władysław Żmuda (c)
RB	10	Stefan Majewski
CB	5	Paweł Janas
LB	7	Jan Jałocha	(substituted off) 26'
DM	8	Waldemar Matysik
CM	16	Grzegorz Lato
CM	3	Janusz Kupcewicz
CM	13	Andrzej Buncol
CF	20	Zbigniew Boniek
CF	11	Włodzimierz Smolarek	(substituted off) 74'
Substitutes:
GK	21	Jacek Kazimierski
RB	2	Marek Dziuba	(substituted on) 26'
DF	12	Roman Wójcicki
MF	14	Andrzej Pałasz
CM	15	Włodzimierz Ciołek	(substituted on) 74'
Manager:
Antoni Piechniczek

GK	21	Ramón Quiroga
DF	2	Jaime Duarte
DF	15	Rubén Toribio Díaz (c)
DF	3	Salvador Salguero
DF	16	Jorge Olaechea
MF	6	José Velásquez	(yellow card) 31'
MF	8	César Cueto
MF	10	Teófilo Cubillas		(substituted off) 50'
FW	5	Germán Leguía
FW	19	Guillermo La Rosa
FW	11	Juan Carlos Oblitas		(substituted off) 50'
Substitutes:
GK	1	Eusebio Acasuzo
FW	7	Gerónimo Barbadillo		(substituted on) 50'
MF	9	Julio César Uribe		(substituted on) 50'
MF	13	Óscar Arizaga
MF	14	Miguel Gutiérrez
Manager:
(Brazil) Tim

Assistant referees:
Emilio Soriano Aladrén (Spain)
Victoriano Sánchez Arminio (Spain)

=== Italy vs Cameroon ===
23 June 1982
17:15 CEST

Italy	1–1	Cameroon
Graziani 60'		M'Bida 61'

Balaídos, Vigo
Attendance: 20,000
Referee: Bogdan Dotchev (Bulgaria)

Italy	Cameroon

GK	1	Dino Zoff (c)
DF	6	Claudio Gentile
DF	7	Gaetano Scirea
DF	5	Fulvio Collovati
DF	4	Antonio Cabrini
MF	13	Gabriele Oriali
MF	9	Giancarlo Antognoni	(yellow card) 36'
MF	14	Marco Tardelli
FW	16	Bruno Conti
FW	20	Paolo Rossi
FW	19	Francesco Graziani
Substitutes:
GK	12	Ivano Bordon
DF	3	Giuseppe Bergomi
MF	10	Giuseppe Dossena
MF	15	Franco Causio
FW	18	Alessandro Altobelli
Manager:
Enzo Bearzot

GK	1	Thomas N'Kono (c)
DF	2	Michel Kaham
DF	5	Elie Onana
DF	4	René N'Djeya	(yellow card) 36'
DF	7	Ephrem M'Bom
MF	16	Ibrahim Aoudou
MF	6	Emmanuel Kundé
MF	8	Grégoire M'Bida
FW	14	Théophile Abega
FW	9	Roger Milla
FW	10	Jean-Pierre Tokoto
Substitutes:
GK	12	Joseph-Antoine Bell
FW	11	Charles Toubé
DF	15	François N'Doumbé
FW	18	Jacques N'Guea
FW	20	Alain Eyobo
Manager:
(France) Jean Vincent

Assistant referees:
Emilio Soriano Aladrén (Spain)
Victoriano Sánchez Arminio (Spain)

== See also ==
- Cameroon at the FIFA World Cup
- Italy at the FIFA World Cup
- Peru at the FIFA World Cup
- Poland at the FIFA World Cup
