= 1982 FIFA World Cup knockout stage =

The knockout stage of the 1982 FIFA World Cup was the final stage of the final tournament, following the second round group stage. It consisted of two semi-final matches, a match for third place played between the two losing teams of the semi-finals, and the final to determine the winners of the competition. Four teams qualified themselves for this final stage by winning the four second round groups: Poland (winners of Group A), West Germany (Group B), Italy, (Group C) and France (Group D).

In the knockout stage, if a match was level at the end of 90 minutes, extra time of two periods (15 minutes each) would be played. In all matches except the final, if the score was still level after extra time, the match would be decided by a penalty shoot-out. Should the final be level after extra time, the match would instead be replayed.

== Qualified teams ==
The top placed team from each of the four groups of the second round qualified for the knockout stage.

Group	Winners
A	Poland
B	West Germany
C	Italy
D	France

== Bracket ==
Semi-finals
8 July – Barcelona (Camp Nou)
Poland	0
Italy	2
8 July – Seville (Sánchez Pizjuán)
West Germany (p)	3 (5)
France	3 (4)

Final
11 July – Madrid (Bernabéu)
Italy	3
West Germany	1
Match for third place
10 July – Alicante (José Rico Pérez)
Poland	3
France	2

== Semi-finals ==
=== Poland vs Italy ===
8 July 1982
17:15 CEST

Poland	0–2	Italy
		Rossi 22', 73'

Camp Nou, Barcelona
Attendance: 50,000
Referee: Juan Daniel Cardellino (Uruguay)

Poland	Italy

GK	1	Józef Młynarczyk
SW	9	Władysław Żmuda (c)	(yellow card) 51'
RB	2	Marek Dziuba
CB	5	Paweł Janas
LB	10	Stefan Majewski	(yellow card) 43'
DM	8	Waldemar Matysik
CM	13	Andrzej Buncol
CM	3	Janusz Kupcewicz
CM	15	Włodzimierz Ciołek		(substituted off) 46'
CF	16	Grzegorz Lato
CF	11	Włodzimierz Smolarek	(yellow card) 57'	(substituted off) 77'
Substitutes:
GK	21	Jacek Kazimierski
DF	4	Tadeusz Dolny
DF	12	Roman Wójcicki
CM	14	Andrzej Pałasz		(substituted on) 46'
CF	18	Marek Kusto		(substituted on) 77'
Manager:
Antoni Piechniczek

GK	1	Dino Zoff (c)
SW	7	Gaetano Scirea
CB	3	Giuseppe Bergomi
CB	5	Fulvio Collovati	(yellow card) 57'
LB	4	Antonio Cabrini
CM	13	Gabriele Oriali
CM	9	Giancarlo Antognoni		(substituted off) 28'
CM	14	Marco Tardelli
RW	16	Bruno Conti
CF	20	Paolo Rossi
CF	19	Francesco Graziani		(substituted off) 70'
Substitutes:
GK	12	Ivano Bordon
MF	10	Giuseppe Dossena
MF	11	Gianpiero Marini		(substituted on) 28'
MF	15	Franco Causio
FW	18	Alessandro Altobelli		(substituted on) 70'
Manager:
Enzo Bearzot

Assistant referees:
David Socha (United States)
Gilberto Aristizábal (Colombia)

=== West Germany vs France ===
8 July 1982
21:00 CEST

West Germany	3–3 (a.e.t.)	France
Littbarski 17'; Rummenigge 102'; Fischer 108'		Platini 26' (pen.); Trésor 92'; Giresse 98'
Penalties
Kaltz (penalty scored); Breitner (penalty scored); Stielike (penalty missed); Littbarski (penalty scored); Rummenigge (penalty scored); Hrubesch (penalty scored)	5–4	(penalty scored) Giresse; (penalty scored) Amoros; (penalty scored) Rocheteau; (penalty missed) Six; (penalty scored) Platini; (penalty missed) Bossis

Ramón Sánchez Pizjuán Stadium, Seville
Attendance: 70,000
Referee: Charles Corver (Netherlands)

West Germany	France

GK	1	Harald Schumacher
SW	15	Uli Stielike
CB	4	Karlheinz Förster
CB	5	Bernd Förster	(yellow card) 46'
RWB	20	Manfred Kaltz (c)
LWB	2	Hans-Peter Briegel		(substituted off) 97'
DM	6	Wolfgang Dremmler
DM	3	Paul Breitner
RM	7	Pierre Littbarski
LM	14	Felix Magath		(substituted off) 73'
CF	8	Klaus Fischer
Substitutions:
GK	21	Bernd Franke
FW	9	Horst Hrubesch		(substituted on) 73'
MF	10	Hansi Müller
FW	11	Karl-Heinz Rummenigge		(substituted on) 97'
DF	12	Wilfried Hannes
Manager:
Jupp Derwall

GK	22	Jean-Luc Ettori
RB	4	Maxime Bossis
CB	5	Gérard Janvion
CB	8	Marius Trésor
LB	2	Manuel Amoros
DM	9	Bernard Genghini	(yellow card) 40'	(substituted off) 50'
CM	12	Alain Giresse	(yellow card) 35'
CM	14	Jean Tigana
AM	10	Michel Platini (c)
CF	18	Dominique Rocheteau
CF	19	Didier Six
Substitutions:
GK	21	Jean Castaneda
DF	3	Patrick Battiston		(substituted on) 50'	(substituted off) 60'
DF	6	Christian Lopez		(substituted on) 60'
FW	15	Bruno Bellone
FW	20	Gérard Soler
Manager:
Michel Hidalgo

Linesmen:
Bruno Galler (Switzerland)
Bob Valentine (Scotland)

== Match for third place ==
This was the first of what is an ongoing streak of eleven consecutive World Cups in which a European team finished third.

10 July 1982
20:00 CEST

Poland	3–2	France
Szarmach 40'; Majewski 44'; Kupcewicz 46'		Girard 13'; Couriol 72'

Estadio José Rico Pérez, Alicante
Attendance: 28,000
Referee: António Garrido (Portugal)

Poland	France

GK	1	Józef Młynarczyk
SW	9	Władysław Żmuda (c)
RB	2	Marek Dziuba
CB	5	Paweł Janas
LB	10	Stefan Majewski
DM	8	Waldemar Matysik		(substituted off) 46'
CM	16	Grzegorz Lato
CM	3	Janusz Kupcewicz
CM	13	Andrzej Buncol	(yellow card) 62'
CF	20	Zbigniew Boniek
CF	17	Andrzej Szarmach
Substitutes:
GK	22	Piotr Mowlik
DF	4	Tadeusz Dolny
DM	12	Roman Wójcicki	(yellow card) 71'	(substituted on) 46'
MF	14	Andrzej Pałasz
MF	15	Włodzimierz Ciołek
Manager:
Antoni Piechniczek

GK	21	Jean Castaneda
SW	8	Marius Tresor (c)
RB	2	Manuel Amoros
CB	7	Philippe Mahut
LB	5	Gerard Janvion		(substituted off) 65'
CM	14	Jean Tigana		(substituted off) 82'
CM	11	René Girard
CM	13	Jean-François Larios
RW	16	Alain Couriol
LW	15	Bruno Bellone
CF	20	Gerard Soler	(yellow card) 79'
Substitutes:
GK	22	Jean-Luc Ettori
DF	4	Maxime Bossis
RB	6	Christian Lopez		(substituted on) 65'
MF	12	Alain Giresse
LW	19	Didier Six		(substituted on) 82'
Manager:
Michel Hidalgo

Assistant referees:
Mario Rubio Vázquez (Mexico)
Belaïd Lacarne (Algeria)

== Final ==
11 July 1982
20:00 CEST

Italy	3–1	West Germany
Rossi 57'; Tardelli 69'; Altobelli 81'		Breitner 83'

Santiago Bernabéu, Madrid
Attendance: 90,000
Referee: Arnaldo Cézar Coelho (Brazil)

Italy	West Germany

GK	1	Dino Zoff (c)
SW	7	Gaetano Scirea
RB	3	Giuseppe Bergomi
CB	6	Claudio Gentile
CB	5	Fulvio Collovati
LB	4	Antonio Cabrini
DM	13	Gabriele Oriali	(yellow card) 73'
CM	14	Marco Tardelli
RW	16	Bruno Conti	(yellow card) 31'
LW	19	Francesco Graziani		(substituted off) 7'
CF	20	Paolo Rossi
Substitutions:
GK	12	Ivano Bordon
MF	10	Giuseppe Dossena
MF	11	Gianpiero Marini
MF	15	Franco Causio			(substituted on) 89'
FW	18	Alessandro Altobelli		(substituted on) 7'	(substituted off) 89'
Manager:
Enzo Bearzot

GK	1	Harald Schumacher
SW	15	Uli Stielike	(yellow card) 73'
RB	20	Manfred Kaltz
CB	4	Karlheinz Förster
CB	5	Bernd Förster
LB	2	Hans-Peter Briegel
CM	6	Wolfgang Dremmler	(yellow card) 61'	(substituted off) 62'
CM	3	Paul Breitner
RW	11	Karl-Heinz Rummenigge (c)		(substituted off) 70'
LW	7	Pierre Littbarski	(yellow card) 88'
CF	8	Klaus Fischer
Substitutions:
GK	21	Bernd Franke
FW	9	Horst Hrubesch		(substituted on) 62'
MF	10	Hansi Müller		(substituted on) 70'
DF	12	Wilfried Hannes
MF	14	Felix Magath
Manager:
Jupp Derwall

Linesmen:
Abraham Klein (Israel)
Vojtech Christov (Czechoslovakia)
