= 1982 FIFA World Cup Group A =

Football tournament group stage

Group A was one of four groups of national teams competing in the second stage of the 1982 FIFA World Cup. The group's three matches were staged at the Nou Camp in Barcelona. The group consisted of three teams advancing from the first group stage: Group 1 winners Poland, Group 3 winners Belgium and Group 6 runners-up the Soviet Union.

Poland topped the group and advanced to the semi-finals, where they were defeated by eventual champions Italy.

== Qualified teams ==
The winners of Group 1 and 3 and the runner-up of Group 6 qualified for Group A of the second round.

| Group | Winners |
|---|---|
| 1 | Poland |
| 3 | Belgium |
| Group | Runners-up |
| 6 | Soviet Union |

== Standings ==
| Pos | Team | Pld | W | D | L | GF | GA | GD | Pts | Qualification |
|---|---|---|---|---|---|---|---|---|---|---|
| 1 | Poland | 2 | 1 | 1 | 0 | 3 | 0 | +3 | 3 | Advance to knockout stage |
| 2 | Soviet Union | 2 | 1 | 1 | 0 | 1 | 0 | +1 | 3 | |
| 3 | Belgium | 2 | 0 | 0 | 2 | 0 | 4 | −4 | 0 | |

Source: FIFA

== Matches ==
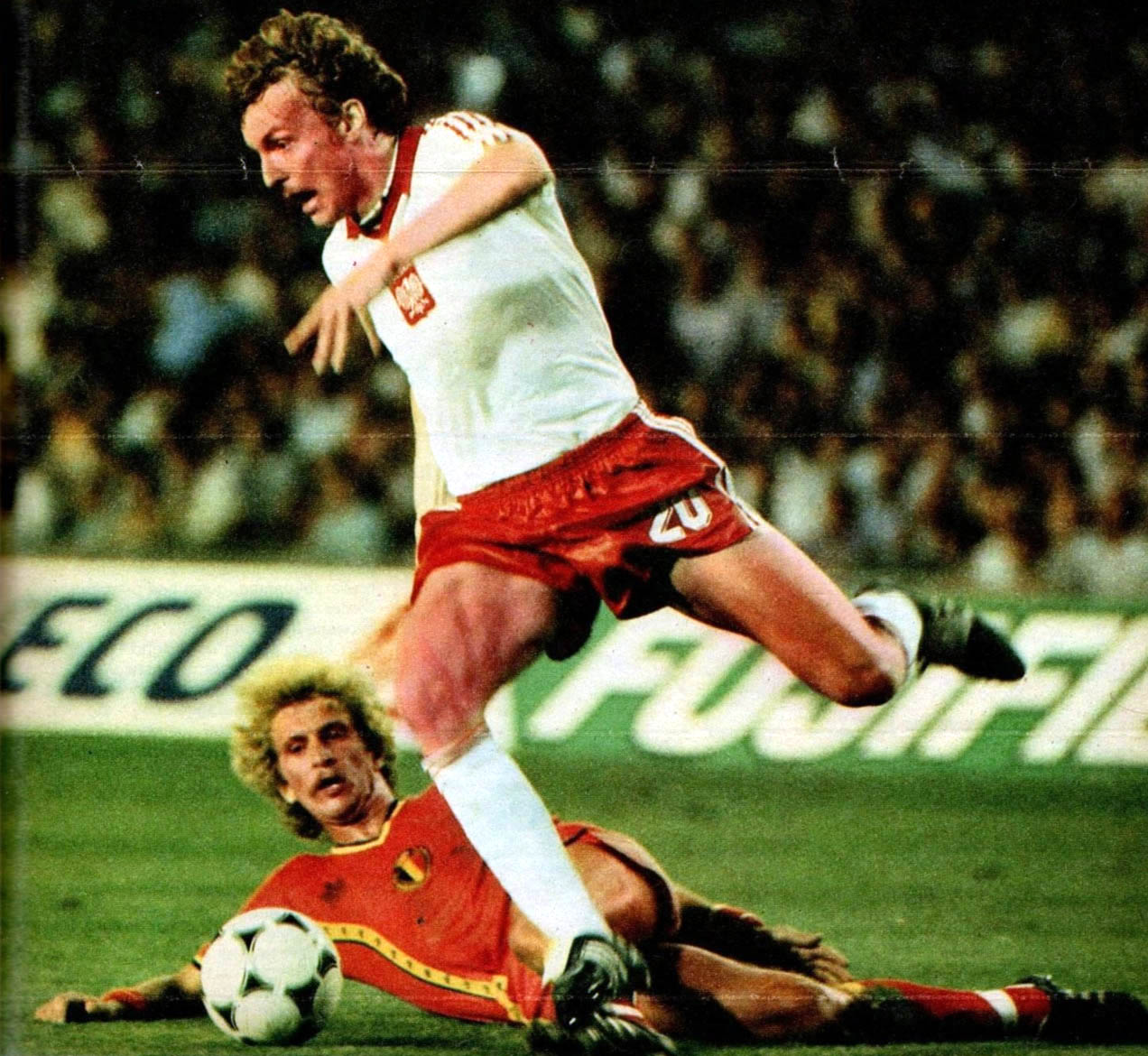
Ludo Coeck and Zbigniew Boniek during the game

=== Poland vs Belgium ===
28 June 1982
21:00 CEST

| Poland | 3–0 | Belgium |
|---|---|---|
| Boniek 4', 26', 53' |

Camp Nou, Barcelona
Attendance: 65,000
Referee: Luis Paulino Siles (Costa Rica)

| Poland | Belgium |

| GK | 1 | Józef Młynarczyk |
| SW | 9 | Władysław Żmuda (c) |
| RB | 2 | Marek Dziuba |
| CB | 5 | Paweł Janas |
| LB | 10 | Stefan Majewski |
| DM | 8 | Waldemar Matysik |
| CM | 16 | Grzegorz Lato |
| CM | 3 | Janusz Kupcewicz | | (substituted off) 82' |
| CM | 13 | Andrzej Buncol |
| CF | 20 | Zbigniew Boniek |
| CF | 11 | Włodzimierz Smolarek | (yellow card) 48' |
Substitutes:
| GK | 21 | Jacek Kazimierski |
| DF | 4 | Tadeusz Dolny |
| MF | 14 | Andrzej Pałasz |
| CM | 15 | Włodzimierz Ciołek | | (substituted on) 82' |
| FW | 17 | Andrzej Szarmach |
Manager:
Antoni Piechniczek

| GK | 12 | Theo Custers |
| DF | 4 | Walter Meeuws (c) |
| DF | 5 | Michel Renquin |
| DF | 3 | Luc Millecamps |
| DF | 16 | Gerard Plessers | (substituted off) 87' |
| MF | 8 | Wilfried Van Moer | (substituted off) 46' |
| MF | 6 | Franky Vercauteren |
| MF | 10 | Ludo Coeck |
| MF | 11 | Jan Ceulemans |
| FW | 9 | Erwin Vandenbergh |
| FW | 21 | Alexandre Czerniatynski |
Substitutes:
| GK | 22 | Jacky Munaron |
| FW | 13 | François Van der Elst | (substituted on) 46' |
| DF | 14 | Marc Baecke | (substituted on) 87' |
| MF | 17 | René Verheyen |
| MF | 18 | Raymond Mommens |
Manager:
Guy Thys

Assistant referees:
Enrique Labo Revoredo (Peru)
Gastón Castro (Chile)

=== Belgium vs Soviet Union ===
1 July 1982
21:00 CEST

| Belgium | 0–1 | Soviet Union |
|---|---|---|
| | | Oganesian 48' |

Camp Nou, Barcelona
Attendance: 45,000
Referee: Michel Vautrot (France)

| Belgium | Soviet Union |

| GK | 22 | Jacky Munaron |
| DF | 4 | Walter Meeuws (c) |
| DF | 5 | Michel Renquin |
| DF | 3 | Luc Millecamps |
| DF | 15 | Maurits De Schrijver | (substituted off) 65' |
| MF | 10 | Ludo Coeck |
| MF | 20 | Guy Vandersmissen | (substituted off) 67' |
| MF | 6 | Franky Vercauteren |
| MF | 11 | Jan Ceulemans |
| FW | 9 | Erwin Vandenbergh |
| FW | 17 | René Verheyen |
Substitutes:
| GK | 12 | Theo Custers |
| MF | 7 | Jos Daerden |
| MF | 18 | Raymond Mommens |
| MF | 19 | Marc Millecamps | (substituted on) 65' |
| FW | 21 | Alexandre Czerniatynski | (substituted on) 67' |
Manager:
Guy Thys

| GK | 1 | Rinat Dasayev |
| SW | 3 | Aleksandre Chivadze (c) |
| DF | 6 | Anatoliy Demyanenko |
| DF | 5 | Sergei Baltacha |
| DF | 14 | Sergei Borovsky |
| MF | 8 | Volodymyr Bezsonov | (yellow card) 77' |
| MF | 10 | Khoren Oganesian |
| MF | 12 | Andriy Bal | | (substituted off) 87' |
| FW | 7 | Ramaz Shengelia | | (substituted off) 90' |
| FW | 9 | Yuri Gavrilov |
| FW | 11 | Oleh Blokhin |
Substitutes:
| GK | 22 | Vyacheslav Chanov |
| DF | 2 | Tengiz Sulakvelidze |
| MF | 13 | Vitaly Daraselia | | (substituted on) 87' |
| FW | 15 | Sergey Andreyev |
| FW | 16 | Sergey Rodionov | | (substituted on) 90' |
Manager:
Konstantin Beskov

Assistant referees:
Charles Corver (Netherlands)
António Garrido (Portugal)

=== Soviet Union vs Poland ===
4 July 1982
21:00 CEST

| Soviet Union | 0–0 | Poland |

Camp Nou, Barcelona
Attendance: 65,000
Referee: Bob Valentine (Scotland)

| Soviet Union | Poland |

| GK | 1 | Rinat Dasayev |
| DF | 2 | Tengiz Sulakvelidze |
| DF | 3 | Aleksandre Chivadze (c) | (yellow card) 38' |
| DF | 5 | Sergei Baltacha | (yellow card) 90' |
| DF | 6 | Anatoliy Demyanenko |
| MF | 8 | Volodymyr Bezsonov |
| MF | 14 | Sergei Borovsky | (yellow card) 87' |
| MF | 9 | Yuri Gavrilov | | (substituted off) 78' |
| MF | 10 | Khoren Oganesian |
| FW | 7 | Ramaz Shengelia | | (substituted off) 56' |
| FW | 11 | Oleh Blokhin |
Substitutes:
| GK | 22 | Vyacheslav Chanov |
| MF | 12 | Andriy Bal |
| MF | 13 | Vitaly Daraselia | | (substituted on) 78' |
| FW | 15 | Sergey Andreyev | | (substituted on) 56' |
| FW | 16 | Sergey Rodionov |
Manager:
Konstantin Beskov

| GK | 1 | Józef Młynarczyk |
| SW | 9 | Władysław Żmuda (c) |
| RB | 2 | Marek Dziuba |
| CB | 5 | Paweł Janas |
| LB | 10 | Stefan Majewski |
| DM | 8 | Waldemar Matysik |
| CM | 16 | Grzegorz Lato |
| CM | 3 | Janusz Kupcewicz | | (substituted off) 51' |
| CM | 13 | Andrzej Buncol | (yellow card) 65' |
| CF | 20 | Zbigniew Boniek | (yellow card) 88' |
| CF | 11 | Włodzimierz Smolarek |
Substitutes:
| GK | 21 | Jacek Kazimierski |
| DF | 4 | Tadeusz Dolny |
| DF | 12 | Roman Wójcicki |
| CM | 15 | Włodzimierz Ciołek | | (substituted on) 51' |
| FW | 17 | Andrzej Szarmach |
Manager:
Antoni Piechniczek

Assistant referees:
Henning Lund-Sørensen (Denmark)
Clive White (England)

== See also ==
- Belgium at the FIFA World Cup
- Poland at the FIFA World Cup
- Soviet Union at the FIFA World Cup
