= Peru at the FIFA World Cup =

International football delegation

Peru participated in the World Cup during the first World Cup in 1930 and has participated in qualifiers since 1958.

Peru were invited to the first FIFA World Cup in Uruguay in 1930. They lost both of their games and finished 10th out of 13 teams. The team either withdrew or did not enter the next four tournaments, in 1934, 1938, 1950, and 1954. Peru participated but did not qualify in 1958, 1962, or 1966.

Peru had its best result in Mexico 1970, finishing in seventh place. Peru again finished in the top eight at the World Cup in Argentina 1978. They finished first in their group during the first round of the tournament, but were eliminated after losing all their games in the second round. Peru reached the next World Cup finals in Spain 1982, although the team was eliminated in the first round after 2 draws and 1 loss. From 1986 to 2014, Peru did not advance past the CONMEBOL qualifying round.

After finishing fifth in CONMEBOL qualifying, Peru reached the 2018 finals by defeating New Zealand in an intercontinental play-off. Peru did not make it past the group stage in 2018, winning one match and losing two.

Peru finished fifth again in 2022 qualification and returned to the intercontinental play-off, this time as a one-off match against Australia. However, Peru would lose the match on penalties, 5–4, thus failing to qualify for Group D of the 2022 FIFA World Cup.

== History ==
=== Finals ===
As one of the 13 national sides that accepted the invitation to the inaugural World Cup, Peru was placed in Group 3 with Romania and hosts Uruguay. With a mere 300 spectators, Peru's match against Romania holds the record of lowest attendance in a World Cup game. Peru lost (1–3) in a violent game where, in the second half, a fight broke out and a Peruvian became the first player sent off in a World Cup. (Note: According to FIFA, the player was defender Plácido Galindo, but forward Souza Ferreira and other sources contend that it was midfielder Mario de las Casas.) A few days later, Peru and Uruguay played the inaugural match in the Estadio Centenario in Montevideo. The Peruvians were lauded by the spectators for their defense and the impressive ability of forward José María Lavalle. Peru lost (0-1) to the eventual champions, who defeated their subsequent opponents by scoring at least 4 goals per game.

The Peruvian squad next qualified for the Mexico 1970 World Cup, where they were placed in Group 4 with West Germany, Bulgaria, and Morocco. Playing their first game two days after the 1970 Ancash earthquake, the team quickly conceded two goals to Bulgaria. However, as Brian Glanville stated, "the elusive dribbling of Cubillas, the powerful breaks from the back four of Héctor Chumpitaz, the running of [Hugo] Sotil and [Alberto] Gallardo, turned the tide." Peru eventually won 3–2. After defeating Morocco (3–0) and losing to West Germany (1–3), the team finished second in the group and advanced to the quarter-finals. Facing Rivellino, Tostão, Jairzinho and Pelé, Peru was beaten by Brazil (2–4) in "a spectacular and effervescent game, a game in which both sides delighted in attack and scorned caution," and where both teams displayed "a feast of open play and goals."

In the Argentina 1978 World Cup, Peru was placed in Group 4 with Scotland, Iran, and the Netherlands. With a midfield identified "as the best in the world" by Argentine sports magazine El Gráfico, Peru advanced to the second round as group leaders after defeating Scotland (3–1), drawing with the Netherlands (0–0), and beating Iran (4–1). The second round was divided into two groups, and Peru's results placed it in Group B with Poland, Brazil, and Argentina. After losing to Brazil (0–3) and Poland (0–1), Peru was practically out of contention despite having one more game to play against Argentina. This last match proved controversial because the Peruvians lost by a margin (0–6) that allowed Argentina to reach the final instead of Brazil. Rumors circulated that the match had been fixed, (Note: The unproven allegations were that Peruvian goalkeeper Ramón Quiroga (who was born in Argentina) feared hatred from his birthplace, that Peru simply did not want Brazil to reach the final, and that a government deal between Peru and Argentina arranged the result.) but nothing was ever proven.

Peru participated in the Spain 1982 World Cup as part of Group 1 with Italy, Poland, and Cameroon. Prior to the competition, Peru embarked on a practice tour that included victories against Hungary (1–2) in Budapest and France (0–1) in Paris, a tie with Algeria (1–1) in Algiers, and, upon returning home, a victory over Romania (2–0). In the World Cup finals, Peru's opening match against Cameroon ended in a scoreless draw. Against Italy, Peru "put on a mix of solid defending and spectacular attacking" that resulted in a draw (1–1) against the eventual champions. Peru only needed another draw to advance in the tournament, and it managed to maintain a scoreless first half against Poland, but a "mixup in the midfield" and a "tired defense" during the second half led to Peru's defeat (1–5) and early elimination.

Peru would next participate at a World Cup in Russia in 2018, 36 years after their last appearance. On 16 June 2018 they lost 0–1 against Denmark, with a goal scored by Yussuf Poulsen; on 21 June they lost 0–1 against France, with a goal scored by Kylian Mbappé; and on 26 June they defeated Australia 2–0, with goals scored by André Carrillo and Paolo Guerrero. It was the first time Peru had played these three nations at a World Cup, but they were eliminated in the group stage after finishing third with three points.

=== Qualifiers ===
Teams were invited to participate at the 1930 World Cup, so there was no qualifying tournaments. Peru did not enter or withdrew from the qualifying rounds in 1934, 1938, 1950 and 1954. Peru failed to qualify in 1958, 1962 and 1966.

For the 1970 CONMEBOL qualifying tournament, Peru eliminated Bolivia and Argentina. The game between Peru and Bolivia in La Paz is infamous for being fixed by Argentina in favor of Bolivia. Match referee Sergio Chechelev annulled a valid goal from Peru without any justification, allowing Bolivia to win 2–1. Years later, Chechelev admitted that Argentina had paid him to favor Bolivia. Against Argentina in Buenos Aires, the last game of the group, Peru managed a 2–2 draw, preventing Argentina's intervention from succeeding in the end. This is the only time Argentina has failed to advance in World Cup qualifying.

Peru was eliminated by Chile in 1974. In 1978 and 1982, Peru finished at the top of their group and advanced to the finals. Peru had two wins and two draws in both three-team groups, eliminating Chile and Ecuador in 1978 and Uruguay and Columbia in 1982.

Peru almost qualified for Mexico 1986. Peru was placed in Group 1 with Argentina, Colombia and Venezuela. Peru's last two matches were against Argentina. Peru beat Argentina 1–0 in Lima on 23 June 1985. In a rematch seven days later in Buenos Aires, Peru led 2–1 but Ricardo Gareca inspired his team to a 2–2 draw sending Argentina into the World Cup finals which they would win. A win would have put Peru directly into the finals, however, they still had a chance to qualify through the CONMEBOL playoff. Peru lost 2–5 aggregate to Chile in the first round.

Peru was grouped for the 1990 World Cup qualification along with Bolivia and Uruguay. Peru lost all their games with only two goals scored, one by José del Solar and the other by Andres Gonzales. Julio César Uribe was considered one of the best players of the team at that time.

The campaign to reach France 1998 was settled only on goal difference, as they finished even on points with Chile. The qualifying system had changed and now all teams were to face each other, and Peru had been able to maintain the 4th spot until the next-to-last match when they faced Chile at Santiago. Peru lost 4–0.

The preliminaries for Korea/Japan 2002 were difficult, as the team finished eighth in the group with just four wins in eighteen matches. The fact that they only managed to score 14 goals demonstrated how far the attack had fallen since the days of Cubillas. Particularly low points of the qualifying tournament included a 3–0 loss at Venezuela and defeats in over half of their home matches to Uruguay, Ecuador, Argentina, Colombia and Brazil.

During the years of 2004 and 2005, Peru participated in the qualifier for the Germany 2006 World Cup. Peru this time hit the ground hard as conflicts with the team's management soon showed poor results in the games that were to follow. Paulo Autuori managed the squad, but was not able to achieve popularity due to a disastrous campaign that led Peru into 8th place just above Bolivia and Venezuela. Freddy Ternero also momentarily managed the squad, but was dismissed due to problems with the FPF.

The South Africa 2010 qualifiers, beginning in 2007, resulted in another set of problems for the Peruvian team. In their first four games, the team only achieved two ties, both at home, and two losses. Controversies between the FPF and the IPD (Peruvian Sports Institute) caused problems outside of the field for the national team. Also a scandal shook the team as it was discovered, with informational support of prominent figures such as Jaime Bayly, that several of the players had been partying during the time they were supposedly "concentrating" for a match against Brazil. Since then, Claudio Pizarro (SV Werder Bremen), Jefferson Farfán (Schalke 04), Andrés Mendoza (Diyarbakırspor) and Santiago Acasiete (UD Almería), important figures in the team, were never considered again for the national team by coach José del Solar. The 2008 calendar year resulted with three losses, including a 6–0 defeat against Uruguay, two draws against Argentina and Colombia, and only one game won against Venezuela. In 2009 la blanquirroja couldn't revert the situation, being the first team eliminated, at the 14th round. They only won two matches during this year, against Uruguay and Bolivia.

Finally, after 36 years, the national team managed to make it to the 2018 World Cup in Russia. They finished fifth in the qualifiers, following a controversial final day draw against Colombia. They went on to face New Zealand in an inter-continental play-off, winning 2–0 on aggregate, courtesy of goals from Farfán and Christian Ramos, to become the last team to qualify for Russia.

=== By Opponent ===
FIFA World Cup matches (by team)
Opponent	Total	Wins	Draws	Losses	GF	GA	GD
Argentina	1	0	0	1	0	6	-6
Australia	1	1	0	0	2	0	+2
Bulgaria	1	1	0	0	3	2	+1
Brazil	2	0	0	2	2	5	-3
Cameroon	1	0	1	0	0	0	0
Denmark	1	0	0	1	0	1	-1
France	1	0	0	1	0	1	-1
Italy	1	0	1	0	1	1	0
Iran	1	1	0	0	4	1	+3
Morocco	1	1	0	0	3	0	3
Netherlands	1	0	1	0	0	0	0
Poland	2	0	0	2	1	6	-5
Romania	1	0	0	1	3	1	−2
Scotland	1	1	0	0	3	1	+2
West Germany	1	0	0	1	1	3	-2
Uruguay	1	0	0	1	0	1	-1

== Record at the FIFA World Cup ==
=== Overall record ===
FIFA World Cup record										Qualification record						
Year	Host	Round	Pld	W	D	L	GF	GA	Squad	Pos.	Pld	W	D	L	GF	GA
1930	Uruguay	Group stage	2	0	0	2	1	4	Squad	Qualified as invitees						
1934	Italy	Withdrew								Withdrew						
1938	France	Did not enter								Did not enter						
1950	Brazil	Withdrew								Withdrew						
1954	Switzerland	Withdrew								Withdrew						
1958	Sweden	Did not qualify								2nd	2	0	1	1	1	2
1962	Chile	Did not qualify								2nd	2	0	1	1	1	2
1966	England	Did not qualify								2nd	4	2	0	2	8	6
1970	Mexico	Quarter-finals	4	2	0	2	9	9	Squad	1st	4	2	1	1	7	4
1974	West Germany	Did not qualify								Play-off	3	1	0	2	3	4
1978	Argentina	Quarter-finals (Note: Last 8 held as second group stage.)	6	2	1	3	7	12	Squad	2nd	6	3	2	1	13	3
1982	Spain	Group stage	3	0	2	1	2	6	Squad	1st	4	2	2	0	5	2
1986	Mexico	Did not qualify								Play-offs	8	3	2	3	10	9
1990	Italy	Did not qualify								3rd	4	0	0	4	2	8
1994	United States	Did not qualify								4th	6	0	1	5	4	12
1998	France	Did not qualify								5th	16	7	4	5	19	20
2002	South Korea; Japan	Did not qualify								8th	18	4	4	10	14	25
2006	Germany	Did not qualify								9th	18	4	6	8	20	28
2010	South Africa	Did not qualify								10th	18	3	4	11	11	34
2014	Brazil	Did not qualify								7th	16	4	3	9	17	26
2018	Russia	Group stage	3	1	0	2	2	2	Squad	Play-off	20	8	6	6	29	26
2022	Qatar	Did not qualify								Play-off	19	7	4	8	19	22
2026	Canada; Mexico; United States	Did not qualify								9th	18	2	6	10	6	21
2030	Morocco; Portugal; Spain	To be determined								To be determined						
2034	Saudi Arabia	To be determined								To be determined						
Total		Quarter-finals	18	5	3	10	21	33	—	5/23	186	52	47	87	189	254

=== By match ===
FIFA World Cup history
Year	Round	Score	Result	Scorers
1930	Group stage	Peru 1 – 3 Romania	Lost	Souza 75'
1930	Group stage	Peru 0 – 1 Uruguay	Lost	
1970	Group stage	Peru 3 – 2 Bulgaria	Won	Gallardo 50'; Chumpitaz 55'; Cubillas 73'
1970	Group stage	Peru 3 – 0 Morocco	Won	Cubillas 65', 75'; Challe 67'
1970	Group stage	Peru 1 – 3 West Germany	Lost	Cubillas 44'
1970	Quarter-finals	Peru 2 – 4 Brazil	Lost	Gallardo 28'; Cubillas 70'
1978	First round	Peru 3 – 1 Scotland	Won	Cueto 43'; Cubillas 70', 76'
1978	First round	Peru 0 – 0 Netherlands	Drawn	
1978	First round	Peru 4 – 1 Iran	Won	Velásquez 2'; Cubillas 36' (pen.), 39' (pen.), 79'
1978	Second round	Peru 0 – 3 Brazil	Lost	
1978	Second round	Peru 0 – 1 Poland	Lost	
1978	Second round	Peru 0 – 6 Argentina	Lost	
1982	Group stage	Peru 0 – 0 Cameroon	Drawn	
1982	Group stage	Peru 1 – 1 Italy	Drawn	Díaz 83'
1982	Group stage	Peru 1 – 5 Poland	Lost	La Rosa 83'
2018	Group stage	Peru 0 – 1 Denmark	Lost	
2018	Group stage	Peru 0 – 1 France	Lost	
2018	Group stage	Peru 2 – 0 Australia	Won	Carrillo 18'; Guerrero 50'

=== Qualification record ===
FIFA World Cup qualification history
Year	Round	H/A	Score	Result	Ref.
1958	Group 1	H	Peru 1 – 1 Brazil	Drawn	
1958	Group 1	A	Peru 0 – 1 Brazil	Lost	
1962	Group 3	A	Peru 0 – 1 Colombia	Lost	
1962	Group 3	H	Peru 1 – 1 Colombia	Drawn	
1966	Group 1	H	Peru 1 – 0 Venezuela	Won	
1966	Group 1	A	Peru 6 – 3 Venezuela	Won	
1966	Group 1	H	Peru 0 – 1 Uruguay	Lost	
1966	Group 1	A	Peru 1 – 2 Uruguay	Lost	
1970	Group 1	H	Peru 1 – 0 Argentina	Won	
1970	Group 1	A	Peru 1 – 2 Bolivia	Lost	
1970	Group 1	H	Peru 3 – 0 Bolivia	Won	
1970	Group 1	A	Peru 2 – 2 Argentina	Drawn	
1974	Group 3	H	Peru 2 – 0 Chile	Won	
1974	Group 3	A	Peru 0 – 2 Chile	Lost	
1974	Play Off	N	Peru 1 – 2 Chile	Lost	
1978	Group 3	A	Peru 1 – 1 Ecuador	Drawn	
1978	Group 3	A	Peru 1 – 1 Chile	Drawn	
1978	Group 3	H	Peru 4 – 0 Ecuador	Won	
1978	Group 3	H	Peru 2 – 0 Chile	Won	
1978	Final Round	A	Peru 0 – 1 Brazil	Lost	
1978	Final Round	H	Peru 5 – 0 Bolivia	Won	
1982	Group 2	A	Peru 1 – 1 Colombia	Drawn	
1982	Group 2	H	Peru 2 – 0 Colombia	Won	
1982	Group 2	A	Peru 2 – 1 Uruguay	Won	
1982	Group 2	H	Peru 0 – 0 Uruguay	Drawn	
1986	Group 1	A	Peru 0 – 1 Colombia	Lost	
1986	Group 1	A	Peru 1 – 0 Venezuela	Won	
1986	Group 1	H	Peru 0 – 0 Colombia	Drawn	
1986	Group 1	H	Peru 4 – 1 Venezuela	Won	
1986	Group 1	H	Peru 1 – 0 Argentina	Won	
1986	Group 1	A	Peru 2 – 2 Argentina	Drawn	
1986	Play Off	A	Peru 2 – 4 Chile	Lost	
1986	Play Off	H	Peru 0 – 1 Chile	Lost	
1990	Group 1	A	Peru 1 – 2 Bolivia	Lost	
1990	Group 1	H	Peru 0 – 2 Uruguay	Lost	
1990	Group 1	H	Peru 1 – 2 Bolivia	Lost	
1990	Group 1	A	Peru 0 – 2 Uruguay	Lost	
1994	Group 1	H	Peru 0 – 1 Argentina	Lost	
1994	Group 1	H	Peru 0 – 1 Colombia	Lost	
1994	Group 1	A	Peru 1 – 2 Paraguay	Lost	
1994	Group 1	A	Peru 1 – 2 Argentina	Lost	
1994	Group 1	A	Peru 0 – 4 Colombia	Lost	
1994	Group 1	H	Peru 2 – 2 Paraguay	Drawn	
1998		A	Peru 1 – 4 Ecuador	Lost	
1998		H	Peru 1 – 1 Colombia	Drawn	
1998		H	Peru 0 – 0 Argentina	Drawn	
1998		A	Peru 0 – 0 Bolivia	Drawn	
1998		H	Peru 4 – 1 Venezuela	Won	
1998		A	Peru 0 – 2 Uruguay	Lost	
1998		H	Peru 2 – 1 Chile	Won	
1998		A	Peru 1 – 2 Paraguay	Lost	
1998		H	Peru 1 – 1 Ecuador	Drawn	
1998		A	Peru 1 – 0 Colombia	Won	
1998		A	Peru 0 – 2 Argentina	Lost	
1998		H	Peru 2 – 1 Bolivia	Won	
1998		A	Peru 3 – 0 Venezuela	Won	
1998		H	Peru 2 – 1 Uruguay	Won	
1998		A	Peru 0 – 4 Chile	Lost	
1998		H	Peru 1 – 0 Paraguay	Won	
2002		H	Peru 2 – 0 Paraguay	Won	
2002		A	Peru 1 – 1 Chile	Drawn	
2002		H	Peru 0 – 1 Brazil	Lost	
2002		A	Peru 1 – 2 Ecuador	Lost	
2002		H	Peru 0 – 1 Colombia	Lost	
2002		A	Peru 0 – 0 Uruguay	Drawn	
2002		H	Peru 1 – 0 Venezuela	Won	
2002		H	Peru 1 – 2 Argentina	Lost	
2002		A	Peru 0 – 1 Bolivia	Lost	
2002		A	Peru 1 – 5 Paraguay	Lost	
2002		H	Peru 3 – 1 Chile	Won	
2002		A	Peru 1 – 1 Brazil	Drawn	
2002		H	Peru 1 – 2 Ecuador	Lost	
2002		A	Peru 1 – 0 Colombia	Won	
2002		H	Peru 0 – 2 Uruguay	Lost	
2002		A	Peru 0 – 3 Venezuela	Lost	
2002		A	Peru 0 – 2 Argentina	Lost	
2002		H	Peru 1 – 1 Bolivia	Drawn	
2006		H	Peru 4 – 1 Paraguay	Won	
2006		A	Peru 1 – 2 Chile	Lost	
2006		H	Peru 1 – 1 Brazil	Drawn	
2006		A	Peru 0 – 0 Ecuador	Drawn	
2006		H	Peru 0 – 2 Colombia	Lost	
2006		A	Peru 3 – 1 Uruguay	Won	
2006		H	Peru 0 – 0 Venezuela	Drawn	
2006		H	Peru 1 – 3 Argentina	Lost	
2006		A	Peru 0 – 1 Bolivia	Lost	
2006		A	Peru 1 – 1 Paraguay	Drawn	
2006		H	Peru 2 – 1 Chile	Won	
2006		A	Peru 0 – 1 Brazil	Lost	
2006		H	Peru 2 – 2 Ecuador	Drawn	
2006		A	Peru 0 – 5 Colombia	Lost	
2006		H	Peru 0 – 0 Uruguay	Drawn	
2006		A	Peru 1 – 4 Venezuela	Lost	
2006		A	Peru 0 – 2 Argentina	Lost	
2006		H	Peru 4 – 1 Bolivia	Won	
2010		H	Peru 0 – 0 Paraguay	Drawn	
2010		A	Peru 0 – 2 Chile	Lost	
2010		H	Peru 1 – 1 Brazil	Drawn	
2010		A	Peru 1 – 5 Ecuador	Lost	
2010		H	Peru 1 – 1 Colombia	Drawn	
2010		A	Peru 0 – 6 Uruguay	Lost	
2010		H	Peru 1 – 0 Venezuela	Won	
2010		H	Peru 1 – 1 Argentina	Drawn	
2010		A	Peru 0 – 3 Bolivia	Lost	
2010		A	Peru 0 – 1 Paraguay	Lost	
2010		H	Peru 1 – 3 Chile	Lost	
2010		A	Peru 0 – 3 Brazil	Lost	
2010		H	Peru 1 – 2 Ecuador	Lost	
2010		A	Peru 0 – 1 Colombia	Lost	
2010		H	Peru 1 – 0 Uruguay	Won	
2010		A	Peru 1 – 3 Venezuela	Lost	
2010		A	Peru 1 – 2 Argentina	Lost	
2010		H	Peru 1 – 0 Bolivia	Won	
2014		H	Peru 2 – 0 Paraguay	Won	
2014		A	Peru 2 – 4 Chile	Lost	
2014		A	Peru 0 – 2 Ecuador	Lost	
2014		H	Peru 0 – 1 Colombia	Lost	
2014		A	Peru 2 – 4 Uruguay	Lost	
2014		H	Peru 2 – 1 Venezuela	Won	
2014		H	Peru 1 – 1 Argentina	Drawn	
2014		A	Peru 1 – 1 Bolivia	Drawn	
2014		A	Peru 0 – 1 Paraguay	Lost	
2014		H	Peru 1 – 0 Chile	Won	
2014		H	Peru 1 – 0 Ecuador	Won	
2014		A	Peru 0 – 2 Colombia	Lost	
2014		H	Peru 1 – 2 Uruguay	Lost	
2014		A	Peru 2 – 3 Venezuela	Lost	
2014		A	Peru 1 – 3 Argentina	Lost	
2014		H	Peru 1 – 1 Bolivia	Drawn	
2018		A	Peru 0 – 2 Colombia	Lost	
2018		H	Peru 3 – 4 Chile	Lost	
2018		H	Peru 1 – 0 Paraguay	Won	
2018		A	Peru 0 – 3 Brazil	Lost	
2018		H	Peru 2 – 2 Venezuela	Drawn	
2018		A	Peru 0 – 1 Uruguay	Lost	
2018		A	Peru 3 – 0 Bolivia	Won	
2018		H	Peru 2 – 1 Ecuador	Won	
2018		H	Peru 2 – 2 Argentina	Drawn	
2018		A	Peru 1 – 2 Chile	Lost	
2018		A	Peru 4 – 1 Paraguay	Won	
2018		H	Peru 0 – 2 Brazil	Lost	
2018		A	Peru 2 – 2 Venezuela	Drawn	
2018		H	Peru 2 – 1 Uruguay	Won	
2018		H	Peru 2 – 1 Bolivia	Won	
2018		A	Peru 2 – 1 Ecuador	Won	
2018		A	Peru 0 – 0 Argentina	Drawn	
2018		H	Peru 1 – 1 Colombia	Drawn	
2018		A	Peru 0 – 0 New Zealand	Drawn	
2018		H	Peru 2 – 0 New Zealand	Won	
2022		A	Peru 2 – 2 Paraguay	Drawn	
2022		H	Peru 2 – 4 Brazil	Lost	
2022		A	Peru 0 – 2 Chile	Lost	
2022		H	Peru 0 – 2 Argentina	Lost	
2022		H	Peru 0 – 3 Colombia	Lost	
2022		A	Peru 2 – 1 Ecuador	Won	
2022		H	Peru 1 – 1 Uruguay	Drawn	
2022		H	Peru 1 – 0 Venezuela	Won	
2022		A	Peru 0 – 2 Brazil	Lost	
2022		H	Peru 2 – 0 Chile	Won	
2022		A	Peru 0 – 1 Bolivia	Lost	
2022		A	Peru 0 – 1 Argentina	Lost	
2022		H	Peru 3 – 0 Bolivia	Won	
2022		A	Peru 2 – 1 Venezuela	Won	
2022		A	Peru 1 – 0 Colombia	Won	
2022		H	Peru 1 – 1 Ecuador	Drawn	
2022		A	Peru 0 – 1 Uruguay	Lost	
2022		H	Peru 2 – 0 Paraguay	Won	
2022		N	Peru 0 – 0 (4 – 5 p) Australia	Drawn	
2026		A	Peru 0 – 0 Paraguay	Drawn	
2026		H	Peru 0 – 1 Brazil	Lost	
2026		A	Peru 0 – 2 Chile	Lost	
2026		H	Peru 0 – 2 Argentina	Lost	
2026		A	Peru 0 – 2 Bolivia	Lost	
2026		H	Peru 1 – 1 Venezuela	Drawn	
2026		H	Peru 1 – 1 Colombia	Drawn	
2026		A	Peru 0 – 1 Ecuador	Lost	
2026		H	Peru 1 – 0 Uruguay	Won	
2026		A	Peru 0 – 4 Brazil	Lost	
2026		H	Peru 0 – 0 Chile	Drawn	
2026		A	Peru 0 – 1 Argentina	Lost	
2026		H	Peru 3 – 1 Bolivia	Won	
2026		A	Peru 0 – 1 Venezuela	Lost	
2026		A	Peru 0 – 0 Colombia	Drawn	
2026		H	Peru 0 – 0 Ecuador	Drawn	
2026		A	Peru 0 – 3 Uruguay	Lost	
2026		H	Peru 0 – 1 Paraguay	Lost	

== List of matches ==
=== 1930 FIFA World Cup ===
==== Group Stage ====
Pos	Team	Pld	W	D	L	GF	GA	GD	Pts	Qualification
1	Uruguay (H)	2	2	0	0	5	0	+5	4	Advance to the knockout stage
2	Romania	2	1	0	1	3	5	−2	2	
3	Peru	2	0	0	2	1	4	−3	0	

Source: ESPN
(H) Hosts
14 July 1930
14:50 UYT (UTC−03:30)

Romania	3–1	Peru
Deșu 1'; Stanciu 79'; Kovács 89'		De Souza 75'

Estadio Pocitos, Montevideo
Attendance: 2,549
Referee: Alberto Warnken (Chile)

18 July 1930
14:30 UYT (UTC−03:30)

Uruguay	1–0	Peru
Castro 65'

Estadio Centenario, Montevideo
Attendance: 57,735
Referee: John Langenus (Belgium)

=== 1970 FIFA World Cup ===
==== Group Stage ====
Pos	Team	Pld	W	D	L	GF	GA	GD	Pts	Qualification
1	West Germany	3	3	0	0	10	4	+6	6	Advance to knockout stage
2	Peru	3	2	0	1	7	5	+2	4	Advance to knockout stage
3	Bulgaria	3	0	1	2	5	9	−4	1	
3	Morocco	3	0	1	2	2	6	−4	1	

Source: FIFA
2 June 1970
16:00

Peru	3–2	Bulgaria
Gallardo 50'; Chumpitaz 55'; Cubillas 73'		Dermendzhiev 13'; Bonev 49'

Estadio Nou Camp, León
Attendance: 13,765
Referee: Antonio Sbardella (Italy)

6 June 1970
16:00

Peru	3–0	Morocco
Cubillas 65', 75'; Challe 67'

Estadio Nou Camp, León
Attendance: 13,537
Referee: Tofiq Bahramov (Soviet Union)

10 June 1970
16:00

West Germany	3–1	Peru
Müller 19', 26', 39'		Cubillas 44'

Estadio Nou Camp, León
Attendance: 17,875
Referee: Abel Aguilar Elizalde (Mexico)

==== Knockout stage ====
Quarter-finals

14 June 1970
12:00

Brazil	4–2	Peru
Rivellino 11'; Tostão 15', 52'; Jairzinho 75'		Gallardo 28'; Cubillas 70'

Estadio Jalisco, Guadalajara
Attendance: 54,233
Referee: Vital Loraux (Belgium)

=== 1978 FIFA World Cup ===
==== First group stage ====
Pos	Team	Pld	W	D	L	GF	GA	GD	Pts	Qualification
1	Peru	3	2	1	0	7	2	+5	5	Advance to second round
2	Netherlands	3	1	1	1	5	3	+2	3	Advance to second round
3	Scotland	3	1	1	1	5	6	−1	3	
4	Iran	3	0	1	2	2	8	−6	1	

Source: FIFA
3 June 1978
16:45 ART

Peru	3–1	Scotland
Cueto 43'; Cubillas 71', 77'		Jordan 14'

Chateau Carreras, Córdoba
Attendance: 37,927
Referee: Ulf Eriksson (Sweden)

7 June 1978
16:45 ART

Netherlands	0–0	Peru

Estadio Ciudad de Mendoza, Mendoza
Attendance: 28,125
Referee: Adolf Prokop (East Germany)

11 June 1978
16:45 ART

Peru	4–1	Iran
Velásquez 2'; Cubillas 36' (pen.), 39' (pen.), 79'		Rowshan 41'

Estadio Chateau Carreras, Córdoba
Attendance: 21,262
Referee: Alojzy Jarguz (Poland)

==== Second group stage ====
Pos	Team	Pld	W	D	L	GF	GA	GD	Pts	Qualification
1	Argentina	3	2	1	0	8	0	+8	5	Advance to final
2	Brazil	3	2	1	0	6	1	+5	5	Advance to match for third place
3	Poland	3	1	0	2	2	5	−3	2	
4	Peru	3	0	0	3	0	10	−10	0	

Source: FIFA
14 June 1978
16:45 ART

Brazil	3–0	Peru
Dirceu 15', 27'; Zico 72' (pen.)

Estadio Ciudad de Mendoza, Mendoza
Attendance: 31,278
Referee: Nicolae Rainea (Romania)

18 June 1978
13:45 ART

Peru	0–1	Poland
		Szarmach 65'

Estadio Ciudad de Mendoza, Mendoza
Attendance: 35,288
Referee: Pat Partridge (England)

21 June 1978
19:15 ART

Argentina	6–0	Peru
Kempes 21', 49'; Tarantini 43'; Luque 50', 72'; Houseman 67'

Estadio Gigante de Arroyito, Rosario
Attendance: 37,315
Referee: Robert Wurtz (France)

=== 1982 FIFA World Cup ===
==== First group stage ====
Pos	Team	Pld	W	D	L	GF	GA	GD	Pts	Qualification
1	Poland	3	1	2	0	5	1	+4	4	Advance to second round
2	Italy	3	0	3	0	2	2	0	3	Advance to second round
3	Cameroon	3	0	3	0	1	1	0	3	
4	Peru	3	0	2	1	2	6	−4	2	

Source: FIFA
15 June 1982
17:15 CEST

Peru	0–0	Cameroon

Estadio de Riazor, A Coruña
Attendance: 11,000
Referee: Franz Wöhrer (Austria)

18 June 1982
17:15 CEST

Italy	1–1	Peru
Conti 18'		Díaz 83'

Balaídos, Vigo
Attendance: 25,000
Referee: Walter Eschweiler (West Germany)

22 June 1982
17:15 CEST

Poland	5–1	Peru
Smolarek 55'; Lato 58'; Boniek 61'; Buncol 68'; Ciołek 76'		La Rosa 83'

Estadio de Riazor, A Coruña
Attendance: 25,000
Referee: Mario Rubio Vázquez (Mexico)

=== 2018 FIFA World Cup ===
==== Group Stage ====
Pos	Team	Pld	W	D	L	GF	GA	GD	Pts	Qualification
1	France	3	2	1	0	3	1	+2	7	Advance to knockout stage
2	Denmark	3	1	2	0	2	1	+1	5	Advance to knockout stage
3	Peru	3	1	0	2	2	2	0	3	
4	Australia	3	0	1	2	2	5	−3	1	

Source: FIFA
16 June 2018
19:00 MSK (UTC+3)

Peru	0–1	Denmark
		Poulsen 59'

Mordovia Arena, Saransk
Attendance: 40,502
Referee: Bakary Gassama (Gambia)

21 June 2018
20:00 YEKT (UTC+5)

France	1–0	Peru
Mbappé 34'

Central Stadium, Yekaterinburg
Attendance: 32,789
Referee: Mohammed Abdulla Hassan Mohamed (United Arab Emirates)

26 June 2018
17:00 MSK (UTC+3)

Australia	0–2	Peru
		Carrillo 18'; Guerrero 50'

Fisht Olympic Stadium, Sochi
Attendance: 44,073
Referee: Sergei Karasev (Russia)

== Player records ==
=== Most appearances ===
Rank	Player	Matches	World Cups
1	Teófilo Cubillas	13	1970, 1978 and 1982
2	Héctor Chumpitaz	10	1970 and 1978
3	César Cueto	9	1978 and 1982
3	Jaime Duarte	9	1978 and 1982
3	Juan Carlos Oblitas	9	1978 and 1982
3	Ramón Quiroga	9	1978 and 1982
7	Hugo Sotil	8	1970 and 1978
7	Guillermo La Rosa	8	1978 and 1982
7	José Velásquez	8	1978 and 1982
10	Rubén Toribio Díaz	7	1978 and 1982

=== Goalscorers ===
On July 14, 1930, Luis de Souza made history by scoring Peru's first-ever FIFA World Cup goal. He did it at their opening match against Romania in Montevideo.

Player	Goals	1930	1970	1978	1982	2018
Teófilo Cubillas	10		5	5		
Alberto Gallardo	2		2			
Luis de Souza	1	1				
Héctor Chumpitaz	1		1			
Roberto Challe	1		1			
César Cueto	1			1		
José Velásquez	1			1		
Rubén Toribio Díaz	1				1	
Guillermo La Rosa	1				1	
André Carrillo	1					1
Paolo Guerrero	1					1
Total	21	1	9	7	2	2

== See also ==
- Peru at the CONCACAF Gold Cup
- Peru at the Copa América
- Peru at the Olympics
- Peru at the Pan American Games
- Peru at the Paralympics
- Peruvian Primera División
- South American nations at the FIFA World Cup
- Sport in Peru

== Bibliography ==
- Christopher, Matt (2010). World Cup. New York: Little, Brown, and Company. ISBN 978-0-316-08857-2.
- Dunmore, Tom (2011). Historical Dictionary of Soccer. Plymouth: Scarecrow Press, Inc. ISBN 978-0-8108-7188-5.
- Edwards, Allan; Skinner, James (2006). Sport Empire. New York: Meyer & Meyer Sport. ISBN 1-84126-168-8.
- Glanville, Brian (2010). The Story of the World Cup: The Essential Companion to South Africa 2010. London: Faber & Faber Limited. ISBN 978-0-571-23605-3.
- Goldblatt, David (2008). The Ball is Round. New York: Riverhead Trade. ISBN 1-59448-296-9.
- Henshaw, Richard (1979). The Encyclopedia of World Soccer. Washington, D.C.: New Republic Books. ISBN 0-915220-34-2.
- Lennox, Doug (2009). Now You Know Soccer. Toronto: Dundurn Press Limited. ISBN 978-1-55488-416-2.
- Panfichi, Aldo; Vich, Victor (2005). "Political and Social Fantasies in Peruvian Football: The Tragedy of Alianza Lima in 1987". In Darby, Paul; Johnes, Martin; Mellor, Gavin (eds.). Soccer and Disaster: International Perspectives. New York: Routledge. ISBN 0-7146-5352-7.
- Witzig, Richard (2006). The Global Art of Soccer. Harahan: CusiBoy Publishing. ISBN 0-9776688-0-0.
- Lisi, Clemente Angelo (2011). History of the World Cup: 1930–2010. Plymouth: Scarecrow Press, Inc. ISBN 978-0-8108-7753-5.
