= Pedro Chinchay =

Peruvian footballer (born 1958)

- Chinchay in 1980

Personal information
- Full name: Pedro Juan Antonio Chinchay Valenzuela
- Date of birth: 19 October 1958 (age 68)
- Place of birth: Breña, Lima, Peru
- Position: Midfielder

Youth career
- 1974–1978: Sporting Cristal

Senior career*
Years	Team	Apps	(Gls)
1979–1980	Sporting Cristal		
1980–1982	Tigres UANL	41	
1983	Deportivo Táchira		
1984	Deportivo Municipal		
1985–1987	Sporting Cristal		
1988	Sport Boys		

International career
1979	Peru U20		(0)
1980	Peru	1	(0)
- * Club domestic league appearances and goals

Pedro Juan Antonio Chinchay Valenzuela (born 19 October 1958) is a Peruvian retired footballer. He played as a midfielder for Sporting Cristal within the Liga 1 in Peru as well as playing abroad for Tigres UANL in the Liga MX throughout the 1980s. He also briefly represented Peru internationally for the 1979 South American U-20 Championship.

== Club career ==
Chinchay was admitted to the youth sector of Sporting Cristal in 1974 at the Colegio Ricardo Bentín in Rímac under Alberto Gallardo, Eloy Campos and Víctor Pasache who had recommended Chinchay for the Celestes. Throughout his youth career, he played alongside Miguel Gutiérrez, Luis Reyna, Luis "Ruso" Delgado and Dardo Acuña Jr. He later made his senior debut under Marcos Calderón during the 1979 season where the Celestes would win the 1979 Torneo Descentralizado with this success being repeated in the following 1980 Torneo Descentralizado as Chinchay was considered to be a breakout player throughout this era. He also played in the controversial 1980 Copa Libertadores away match against River Plate where Chilean referee Gastón Castro would expulse Rubén Toribio Díaz and Ramón Quiroga without reason despite an initial 0–2 lead.

This caught the attention of Liga MX club Tigres UANL who desired to sign him for their 1980–81 season where fellow Peruvian footballer Gerónimo Barbadillo was already playing in. Chinchay made his Liga MX debut on 10 January 1981 in a 3–2 home victory against Unión de Curtidores as a substitute for Salvador Carrillo under Peruvian manager Claudio Lostaunau. From that match onwards, Chinchay became a member of the club's Starting XI and was looking to be a prominent member of the team. However, Chinchay suffered an injury during the second matchday of the 1981–82 season where he had to recover for nearly 2 months until returning during a match against Atlas. New manager Carlos Miloc later lost confidence in Chinchay as on 13 February 1982, during a match against Atletas Campesinos, he was given a red card a minute after coming in as a substitute for Barbadillo and wasn't used again until the final of the 1981–82 season though Chinchay was part of the winning squad of the 1981–82 Mexican Primera División.

Following this, Chinchay continued to play abroad, this time in Venezuela for Deportivo Táchira for the 1983 Venezuelan Primera División season where fellow Peruvian footballers Augusto Palacios and Rodulfo Manzo where already playing at though the club would only reach 7th place. Following this, Chinchay returned to Peru to play for Deportivo Municipal throughout the 1984 Torneo Descentralizado. This was followed by a return to Sporting Cristal from 1985 to 1987 where the Celestes would achieve their best result at 4th place during the 1986 Torneo Descentralizado. He spent his final season with Sport Boys which were recently relegated from the top-flight of Peruvian football for the 1988 Peruvian Segunda División and nearly achieved promotion though ultimately lost out to Defensor Lima.

== International career ==
Following the recommendation of Gallardo, Chinchay was first called up by José Chiarella to represent the Peru national under-20 football team at the 1979 South American U-20 Championship where Peru failed to qualify for the subsequent 1979 FIFA World Youth Championship in Japan. He later played for the senior Peru team in a friendly against Uruguay on 12 November 1980 that ended in a 1–1 draw.

== Later life ==
Chinchay currently serves an assistant coach for youth footballers for Atlético Chalaco.
