= Poland at the FIFA World Cup =

International football delegation

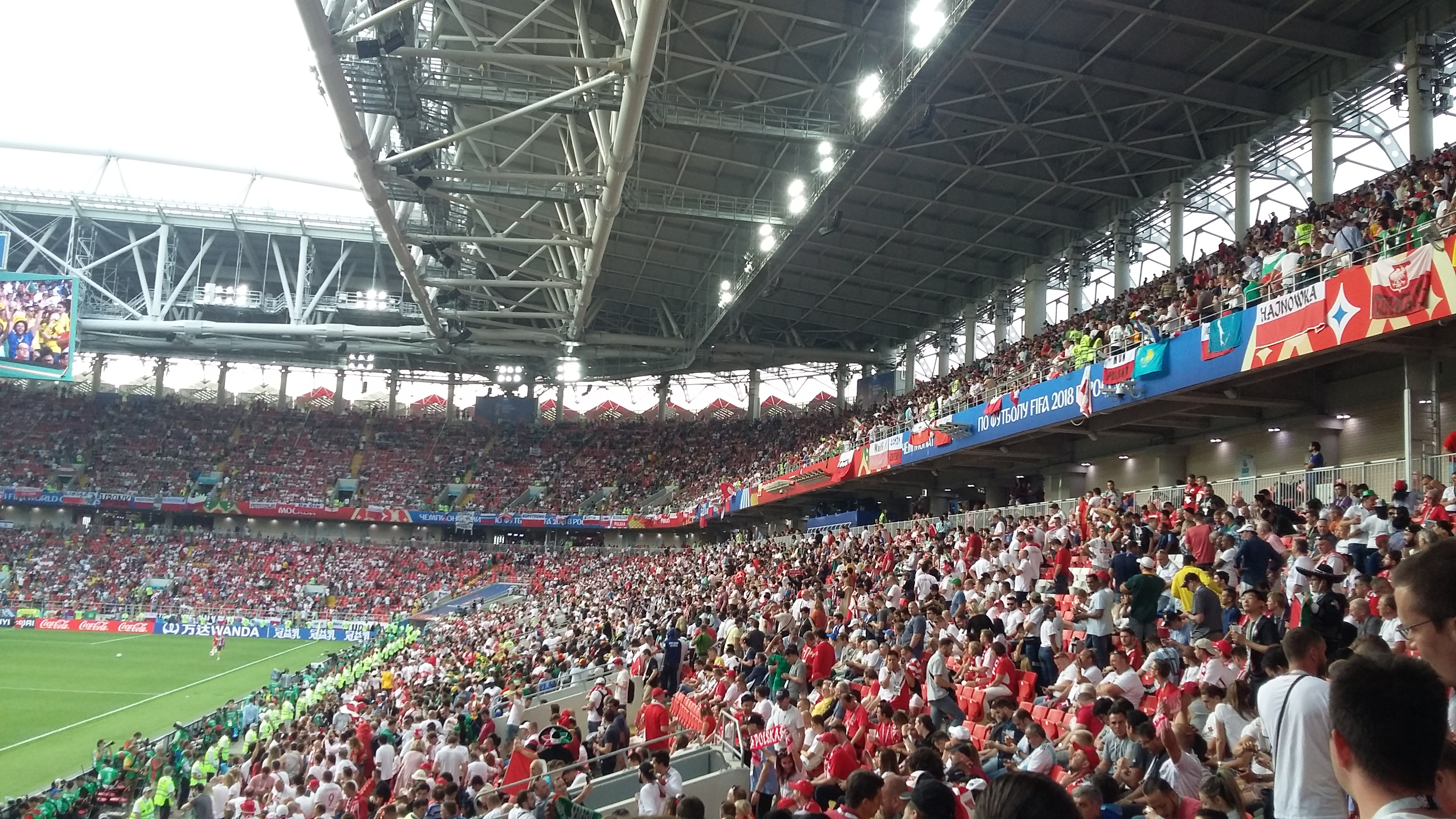
Polish fans at the 2018 World Cup in Moscow, Russia

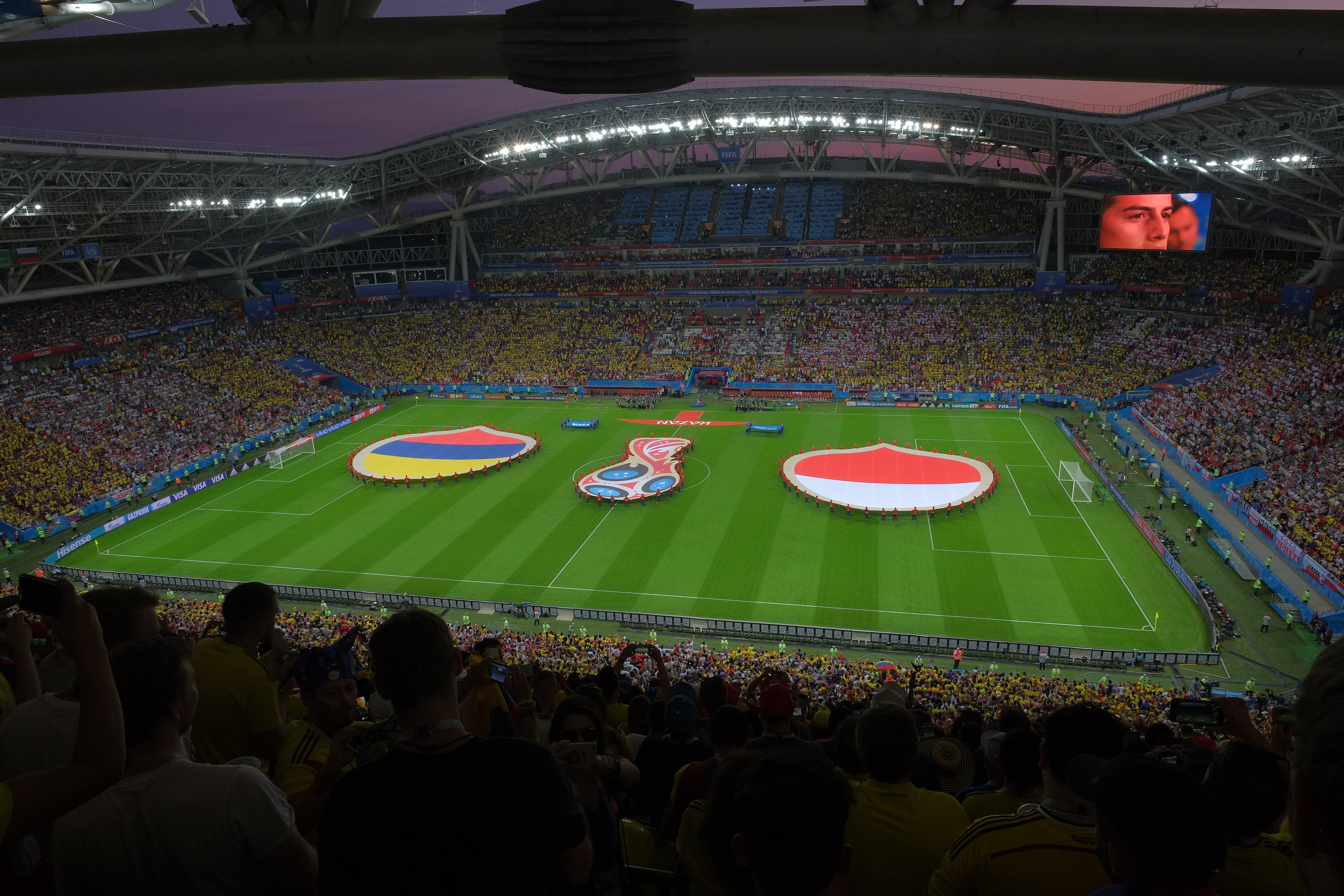
Poland - Colombia match at the 2018 World Cup in Kazan, Russia

This is a record of Poland's results at the FIFA World Cup. They have qualified for the finals on nine occasions, most recently in 2022. The FIFA World Cup is an international association football competition contested by the men's national teams of the members of Fédération Internationale de Football Association (FIFA), the sport's global governing body. The championship has been awarded every four years since the first tournament in 1930, except in 1942 and 1946, due to World War II.

The tournament consists of two parts, the qualification phase and the final phase (officially called the World Cup Finals). The qualification phase, which currently take place over the three years preceding the Finals, is used to determine which teams qualify for the Finals. The current format of the Finals involves 48 teams competing for the title, at venues within the host nation (or nations) over a period of about a month. The World Cup final is the most widely viewed sporting event in the world, with an estimated 715.1 million people watching the 2006 tournament final.

In World Cup history, Poland has participated in nine World Cup editions, started with the 1938 World Cup where they lost to Brazil in a 5–6 thriller. It took Poland thirty-six years later to qualify for another World Cup, where they began to stun the world from eliminating former world champions England in 1974 qualification, to finishing third twice, in 1974 and 1982 editions. After participating in 1986, Poland started to decline and lost momentum in global football.

Since the fall of communist rule in Poland at 1989, Poland managed to qualify for 2002, 2006 and 2018 FIFA World Cups, but the team was unable to repeat the feat of the predecessors, went out from the group stage in all three tournaments with two opening losses before gained a consolidating win in the last match. In 2022, Poland, for the first time since 1986, didn't begin the tournament with a defeat, after holding Mexico goalless, and ultimately went on to advance to the knockout stage for the first time in 36 years.

== World Cup record ==
Year	Result	Position	Pld	W	D*	L	GF	GA
(Uruguay) 1930	Did not enter							
(Italy) 1934	Withdrew							
(France) 1938	Round of 16	11th	1	0	0	1	5	6
(Brazil) 1950	Did not enter							
(Switzerland) 1954	Withdrew							
(Sweden) 1958	Did not qualify							
(Chile) 1962	Did not qualify							
(England) 1966	Did not qualify							
(Mexico) 1970	Did not qualify							
(West Germany) 1974	Third place	3rd	7	6	0	1	16	5
(Argentina) 1978	Quarter-finals (Note: Last 8 held as second group stage.)	5th	6	3	1	2	6	6
(Spain) 1982	Third place	3rd	7	3	3	1	11	5
(Mexico) 1986	Round of 16	14th	4	1	1	2	1	7
(Italy) 1990	Did not qualify							
(United States) 1994	Did not qualify							
(France) 1998	Did not qualify							
(South Korea) (Japan) 2002	Group stage	25th	3	1	0	2	3	7
(Germany) 2006	Group stage	21st	3	1	0	2	2	4
(South Africa) 2010	Did not qualify							
(Brazil) 2014	Did not qualify							
(Russia) 2018	Group stage	25th	3	1	0	2	2	5
(Qatar) 2022	Round of 16	15th	4	1	1	2	3	5
(Canada) (Mexico) (United States) 2026	Did not qualify							
(Morocco) (Portugal) (Spain) 2030	To be determined							
(Saudi Arabia) 2034	To be determined							
Total	Third place	9/22	38	17	6	15	49	50

Poland's World Cup record
First Match	Poland 5–6 Brazil (5 June 1938; Strasbourg, France)
Biggest Win	Poland 7–0 Haiti (19 June 1974; Munich, West Germany)
Biggest Defeat	Brazil 4–0 Poland (16 June 1986; Guadalajara, Mexico); Poland 0–4 Portugal (10 June 2002; Jeonju, South Korea)
Best Result	Third place in 1974 and 1982
Worst Result	Group stage in 1938, 2002, 2006 and 2018

== Match records ==
=== 1938 FIFA World Cup ===
First round

5 June 1938	Brazil	6–5 (a.e.t.)	Poland	Strasbourg, France
17:30 (WEST)	Leônidas 18', 93', 104'; Romeu 25'; Perácio 44', 71'	(4-4,3-1); Report (FIFA)	Scherfke 23' (pen.); Wilimowski 53', 59', 89', 118'	Stadium: Stade de la Meinau; Attendance: 13,452; Referee: Ivan Eklind (Sweden)

=== 1974 FIFA World Cup ===
==== Group stage ====
Pos	Team	Pld	W	D	L	GF	GA	GD	Pts	Qualification
1	Poland	3	3	0	0	12	3	+9	6	Advance to second round
2	Argentina	3	1	1	1	7	5	+2	3	Advance to second round
3	Italy	3	1	1	1	5	4	+1	3	
4	Haiti	3	0	0	3	2	14	−12	0	

Source: FIFA

15 June 1974	Poland	3–2	Argentina	Stuttgart, West Germany
18:00 CET	Lato 7', 62'; Szarmach 8'	(2-0); Report (FIFA)	Heredia 60'; Babington 66'	Stadium: Neckarstadion; Attendance: 32,700; Referee: Clive Thomas (Wales)

19 June 1974	Haiti	0–7	Poland	Munich, West Germany
19:30 CET		(0-5); Report (FIFA)	Lato 17', 87'; Deyna 18'; Szarmach 30', 34', 50'; Gorgoń 31'	Stadium: Olympiastadion; Attendance: 25,300; Referee: Govindasamy Suppiah (Singapore)

23 June 1974	Poland	2–1	Italy	Stuttgart, West Germany
16:00 CET	Szarmach 38'; Deyna 44'	(2-0); Report	Capello 85'	Stadium: Neckarstadion; Attendance: 70,100; Referee: Hans-Joachim Weyland (West Germany)

==== Second group stage ====
Pos	Team	Pld	W	D	L	GF	GA	GD	Pts	Qualification
1	West Germany	3	3	0	0	7	2	+5	6	Advance to final
2	Poland	3	2	0	1	3	2	+1	4	Advance to match for third place
3	Sweden	3	1	0	2	4	6	−2	2	
4	Yugoslavia	3	0	0	3	2	6	−4	0	

Source: FIFA

26 June 1974	Sweden	0–1	Poland	Stuttgart, West Germany
19:30 CET		(0-1); Report (FIFA)	Lato 43'	Stadium: Neckarstadion; Attendance: 44,955; Referee: Ramón Barreto (Uruguay)

30 June 1974	Poland	2–1	Yugoslavia	Frankfurt, West Germany
16:00 CET	Deyna 24' (pen.); Lato 62'	(1-1); Report (FIFA)	Karasi 43'	Stadium: Waldstadion; Attendance: 58,000; Referee: Rudi Glöckner (East Germany)

3 July 1974	Poland	0–1	West Germany	Frankfurt, West Germany
16:30 CET		(0-0); Report (FIFA)	Müller 76'	Stadium: Waldstadion; Attendance: 62,000; Referee: Erich Linemayr (Austria)

Match for third place

6 July 1974	Brazil	0–1	Poland	Munich, West Germany
16:00 CET		(0-0); Report(FIFA)	Lato 76'	Stadium: Olympiastadion; Attendance: 77,100; Referee: Aurelio Angonese (Italy)

=== 1978 FIFA World Cup ===
==== Group stage ====
Pos	Team	Pld	W	D	L	GF	GA	GD	Pts	Qualification
1	Poland	3	2	1	0	4	1	+3	5	Advance to second round
2	West Germany	3	1	2	0	6	0	+6	4	Advance to second round
3	Tunisia	3	1	1	1	3	2	+1	3	
4	Mexico	3	0	0	3	2	12	−10	0	

Source: FIFA

1 June 1978	West Germany	0–0	Poland	Buenos Aires, Argentina
15:00 ART		Report (FIFA)		Stadium: Estadio Monumental; Attendance: 67,579; Referee: Ángel Norberto Coerezza (Argentina)

6 June 1978	Poland	1–0	Tunisia	Rosario, Argentina
16:45 ART	Lato 43'	(1-0); Report (FIFA)		Stadium: Estadio Gigante de Arroyito; Attendance: 9,624; Referee: Ángel Franco Martínez (Spain)

10 June 1978	Poland	3–1	Mexico	Rosario, Argentina
16:45 ART	Boniek 43', 84'; Deyna 56'	(1-0); Report (FIFA)	Rangel 52'	Stadium: Estadio Gigante de Arroyito; Attendance: 22,651; Referee: Jafar Namdar (Iran)

==== Second group stage ====
Pos	Team	Pld	W	D	L	GF	GA	GD	Pts	Qualification
1	Argentina	3	2	1	0	8	0	+8	5	Advance to final
2	Brazil	3	2	1	0	6	1	+5	5	Advance to match for third place
3	Poland	3	1	0	2	2	5	−3	2	
4	Peru	3	0	0	3	0	10	−10	0	

Source: FIFA

14 June 1978	Argentina	2–0	Poland	Rosario, Argentina
19:15 ART	Kempes 16', 72'	(1-0); Report (FIFA)		Stadium: Estadio Gigante de Arroyito; Attendance: 37,091; Referee: Ulf Eriksson (Sweden)

18 June 1978	Peru	0–1	Poland	Mendoza, Argentina
13:45 ART		(0-0); Report (FIFA)	Szarmach 64'	Stadium: Estadio Ciudad de Mendoza; Attendance: 35,288; Referee: Pat Partridge (England)

21 June 1978	Poland	1–3	Brazil	Mendoza, Argentina
16:45 ART	Lato 45'	(1-1); Report (FIFA)	Nelinho 13'; Roberto Dinamite 58', 63'	Stadium: Estadio Ciudad de Mendoza; Attendance: 39,586; Referee: Juan Silvagno Cavanna (Chile)

=== 1982 FIFA World Cup ===
==== Group stage ====
Pos	Team	Pld	W	D	L	GF	GA	GD	Pts	Qualification
1	Poland	3	1	2	0	5	1	+4	4	Advance to second round
2	Italy	3	0	3	0	2	2	0	3	Advance to second round
3	Cameroon	3	0	3	0	1	1	0	3	
4	Peru	3	0	2	1	2	6	−4	2	

Source: FIFA

14 June 1982	Italy	0–0	Poland	Vigo, Spain
17:15 CEST		Report (FIFA)		Stadium: Balaídos; Attendance: 33,040; Referee: Michel Vautrot (France)

19 June 1982	Poland	0–0	Cameroon	A Coruña, Spain
17:15 CEST		Report (FIFA)		Stadium: Estadio de Riazor; Attendance: 19,000; Referee: Alexis Ponnet (Belgium)

22 June 1982	Poland	5–1	Peru	A Coruña, Spain
17:15 CEST	Smolarek 55'; Lato 58'; Boniek 61'; Buncol 68'; Ciołek 76'	(0-0); Report (FIFA)	La Rosa 83'	Stadium: Estadio de Riazor; Attendance: 25,000; Referee: Mario Rubio Vázquez (Mexico)

==== Second group stage ====
Pos	Team	Pld	W	D	L	GF	GA	GD	Pts	Qualification
1	Poland	2	1	1	0	3	0	+3	3	Advance to knockout stage
2	Soviet Union	2	1	1	0	1	0	+1	3	
3	Belgium	2	0	0	2	0	4	−4	0	

Source: FIFA

28 June 1982	Poland	3–0	Belgium	Barcelona, Spain
21:00 CEST	Boniek 4', 26', 53'	(2-0); Report		Stadium: Camp Nou; Attendance: 65,000; Referee: Luis Paulino Siles (Costa Rica)

4 July 1982	Soviet Union	0–0	Poland	Barcelona, Spain
21:00 CEST		Report (FIFA)		Stadium: Camp Nou; Attendance: 65,000; Referee: Bob Valentine (Scotland)

==== Semi-finals ====
8 July 1982	Poland	0–2	Italy	Barcelona, Spain
17:15 CEST		(0-1); Report (FIFA)	Rossi 22', 73'	Stadium: Camp Nou; Attendance: 50,000; Referee: Juan Daniel Cardellino (Uruguay)

==== Match for third place ====
10 July 1982	Poland	3–2	France	Alicante, Spain
20:00 CEST	Szarmach 40'; Majewski 44'; Kupcewicz 46'	(2-1); Report (FIFA)	Girard 13'; Couriol 72'	Stadium: Estadio José Rico Pérez; Attendance: 28,000; Referee: António Garrido (Portugal)

=== 1986 FIFA World Cup ===
Group stage

Pos	Team	Pld	W	D	L	GF	GA	GD	Pts	Qualification
1	Morocco	3	1	2	0	3	1	+2	4	Advance to knockout stage
2	England	3	1	1	1	3	1	+2	3	Advance to knockout stage
3	Poland	3	1	1	1	1	3	−2	3	Advance to knockout stage
4	Portugal	3	1	0	2	2	4	−2	2	

Source: FIFA

2 June 1986	Morocco	0–0	Poland	Monterrey, Mexico
16:00 CST		Report (FIFA)		Stadium: Estadio Universitario; Attendance: 19,900; Referee: José Luis Martínez Bazán (Uruguay)

7 June 1986	Poland	1–0	Portugal	Monterrey, Mexico
16:00 CST	Smolarek 68'	(0-0); Report (FIFA)		Stadium: Estadio Universitario; Attendance: 19,915; Referee: Ali Bin Nasser (Tunisia)

11 June 1986	England	3–0	Poland	Monterrey, Mexico
16:00 CST	Lineker 9', 14', 34'	(3-0); Report (FIFA)		Stadium: Estadio Tecnológico; Attendance: 22,700; Referee: André Daina (Switzerland)

Round of 16

16 June 1986	Brazil	4–0	Poland	Guadalajara, Mexico
12:00 CST	Sócrates 30' (pen.); Josimar 55'; Edinho 79'; Careca 83' (pen.)	(1-0); Report (FIFA)		Stadium: Estadio Jalisco; Attendance: 45,000; Referee: Volker Roth (West Germany)

=== 2002 FIFA World Cup ===
Group stage

Pos	Team	Pld	W	D	L	GF	GA	GD	Pts	Qualification
1	South Korea (H)	3	2	1	0	4	1	+3	7	Advance to knockout stage
2	United States	3	1	1	1	5	6	−1	4	Advance to knockout stage
3	Portugal	3	1	0	2	6	4	+2	3	
4	Poland	3	1	0	2	3	7	−4	3	

Source: FIFA
Rules for classification: Tie-breaking criteria
(H) Hosts

4 June 2002	South Korea	2–0	Poland	Busan, South Korea
20:30	Hwang Sun-hong 26'; Yoo Sang-chul 53'	(1-0); Report (FIFA)		Stadium: Busan Asiad Main Stadium; Attendance: 48,760; Referee: Óscar Ruiz (Colombia)

10 June 2002	Portugal	4–0	Poland	Jeonju, South Korea
20:30	Pauleta 14', 65', 77'; Rui Costa 88'	(1-0); Report		Stadium: Jeonju World Cup Stadium; Attendance: 31,000; Referee: Hugh Dallas (Scotland)

14 June 2002	Poland	3–1	United States	Daejon, South Korea
20:30	Olisadebe 3'; Kryszałowicz 5'; Żewłakow 66'	(2-0); Report	Donovan 83'	Stadium: Daejeon World Cup Stadium; Attendance: 26,482; Referee: Lu Jun (China)

=== 2006 FIFA World Cup ===
Group stage

Pos	Team	Pld	W	D	L	GF	GA	GD	Pts	Qualification
1	Germany (H)	3	3	0	0	8	2	+6	9	Advance to knockout stage
2	Ecuador	3	2	0	1	5	3	+2	6	Advance to knockout stage
3	Poland	3	1	0	2	2	4	−2	3	
4	Costa Rica	3	0	0	3	3	9	−6	0	

Source: FIFA
Rules for classification: Tie-breaking criteria
(H) Hosts

9 June 2006	Poland	0–2	Ecuador	Gelsenkirchen, Germany
21:00		(0-1); Report (FIFA)	24' C. Tenorio; 80' Delgado	Stadium: FIFA WM Stadion Gelsenkirchen; Attendance: 52,000; Referee: Toru Kamikawa (Japan)

14 June 2006	Germany	1–0	Poland	Dortmund, Germany
21:00	Neuville 90+1'	(0-0); Report (FIFA)	(yellow card) 28' (yellow-red card) 75' Sobolewski	Stadium: FIFA WM Stadion Dortmund; Attendance: 65,000; Referee: Luis Medina Cantalejo (Spain)

20 June 2006	Costa Rica	1–2	Poland	Hanover, Germany
16:00	Gómez 25'	Report (FIFA)	33', 65' Bosacki	Stadium: FIFA WM Stadion Hannover; Attendance: 43,000; Referee: Shamsul Maidin (Singapore)

=== 2018 FIFA World Cup ===
Group stage

Pos	Team	Pld	W	D	L	GF	GA	GD	Pts	Qualification
1	Colombia	3	2	0	1	5	2	+3	6	Advance to knockout stage
2	Japan	3	1	1	1	4	4	0	4 (Note: Fair play points: Japan −4, Senegal −6.)	Advance to knockout stage
3	Senegal	3	1	1	1	4	4	0	4	
4	Poland	3	1	0	2	2	5	−3	3	

Source: FIFA
Rules for classification: Group stage tiebreakers
Notes:

19 June 2018	Poland	1–2	Senegal	Moscow, Russia
18:00	Krychowiak 86'	(0-1); Report (FIFA)	37' (o.g.) Cionek; 60' Niang	Stadium: Otkritie Arena; Attendance: 44,190; Referee: Nawaf Shukralla (Bahrain)

24 June 2018	Poland	0–3	Colombia	Kazan, Russia
21:00		(0-1); Report (FIFA)	40' Mina; 70' Falcao; 75' Ju. Cuadrado	Stadium: Kazan Arena; Attendance: 42,873; Referee: César Arturo Ramos (Mexico)

28 June 2018	Japan	0–1	Poland	Volgograd, Russia
17:00		Report (FIFA)	59' Bednarek	Stadium: Volgograd Arena; Attendance: 42,189; Referee: Janny Sikazwe (Zambia)

=== 2022 FIFA World Cup ===
Group stage

Pos	Team	Pld	W	D	L	GF	GA	GD	Pts	Qualification
1	Argentina	3	2	0	1	5	2	+3	6	Advanced to knockout stage
2	Poland	3	1	1	1	2	2	0	4	Advanced to knockout stage
3	Mexico	3	1	1	1	2	3	−1	4	
4	Saudi Arabia	3	1	0	2	3	5	−2	3	

Source: FIFA
Rules for classification: Group stage tiebreakers
22 November 2022
19:00

Mexico	0–0	Poland

Stadium 974, Doha
Attendance: 39,369
Referee: Chris Beath (Australia)

26 November 2022
16:00

Poland	2–0	Saudi Arabia
Zieliński 39'; Lewandowski 82'

Education City Stadium, Al Rayyan
Attendance: 44,259
Referee: Wilton Sampaio (Brazil)

30 November 2022
22:00

Poland	0–2	Argentina
		Mac Allister 46'; Alvarez 67'

Stadium 974, Doha
Attendance: 44,089
Referee: Danny Makkelie (Netherlands)

Knockout stage

Round of 16

4 December 2022
18:00

France	3–1	Poland
Giroud 44'; Mbappé 74', 90+1'		Lewandowski 90+9' (pen.)

Al Thumama Stadium, Doha
Attendance: 40,989
Referee: Jesús Valenzuela (Venezuela)

== Player records ==
=== Most appearances ===
Władysław Żmuda participated in four World Cups and 21 matches as part of Poland's "Golden Generation", both records for the country.

Rank	Player	Matches	World Cups
1	Władysław Żmuda	21	1974, 1978, 1982 and 1986
2	Grzegorz Lato	20	1974, 1978 and 1982
3	Zbigniew Boniek	16	1978, 1982 and 1986
4	Kazimierz Deyna	13	1974 and 1978
4	Henryk Kasperczak	13	1974 and 1978
4	Andrzej Szarmach	13	1974, 1978 and 1982
4	Antoni Szymanowski	13	1974 and 1978
8	Jerzy Gorgoń	12	1974 and 1978
9	Jan Tomaszewski	11	1974 and 1978
9	Stefan Majewski	11	1982 and 1986
9	Józef Młynarczyk	11	1982 and 1986

=== Goalscorers ===
On 5 June 1938, Friedrich Scherfke made history by scoring Poland's first-ever FIFA World Cup goal, doing so in their opening match against Brazil in Strasbourg.

Player	Goals	1938	1974	1982	1986	2002	2006	2018	2022
Grzegorz Lato	10		7	2	1				
Andrzej Szarmach	7		5	1	1				
Zbigniew Boniek	6			2	4				
Ernst Wilimowski	4	4							
Kazimierz Deyna	4		3	1					
Włodzimierz Smolarek	2			1	1				
Bartosz Bosacki	2						2		
Robert Lewandowski	2								2
Emmanuel Olisadebe	1					1			
Paweł Kryszałowicz	1					1			
Marcin Żewłakow	1					1			
Grzegorz Krychowiak	1							1	
Jan Bednarek	1							1	
Piotr Zieliński	1								1
Total	42	4	15	7	7	3	2	2	2

=== Goalscoring by tournament ===
World Cup	Goalscorer(s)
1938	Ernst Wilimowski (4), Fryderyk Scherfke
1974	Grzegorz Lato (7), Andrzej Szarmach (5), Kazimierz Deyna (3), Jerzy Gorgoń
1978	Zbigniew Boniek (2), Grzegorz Lato (2), Kazimierz Deyna, Andrzej Szarmach
1982	Zbigniew Boniek (4), Andrzej Buncol, Włodzimierz Ciołek, Janusz Kupcewicz, Grzegorz Lato, Stefan Majewski, Włodzimierz Smolarek, Andrzej Szarmach
1986	Włodzimierz Smolarek
2002	Paweł Kryszałowicz, Emmanuel Olisadebe, Marcin Żewłakow
2006	Bartosz Bosacki (2)
2018	Grzegorz Krychowiak, Jan Bednarek
2022	Robert Lewandowski (2), Piotr Zieliński

== See also ==
- Poland at the UEFA European Championship
