= Mbom =

Mbom is a Cameroonian masculine given name, or surname.

Notable people with the name Mbom include:

- Ephrem M'Bom (1954–2020), Cameroonian footballer
- Jean-Manuel Mbom (born 2000), German footballer
- Mbom Mbom Julien (born 1984), Cameroonian footballer
