= Jan Jałocha =

Polish footballer (born 1957)

Personal information
- Date of birth: 18 July 1957 (age 69)
- Place of birth: Golkowice, Poland
- Height: 1.74 m (5 ft 9 in)
- Positions: Defender; midfielder

Youth career
- Swoszowianka Swoszowice

Senior career*
Years	Team	Apps	(Gls)
1974–1986	Wisła Kraków	234	(19)
1986–1988	FC Augsburg	67	(13)
1988–1990	SpVgg Bayreuth	65	(10)
1990–1995	Eintracht Trier 05		
1996–1997	VfL Trier 1912		
2002–2003	VfL Trier 1912		
2005–2006	SV Krettnach		
2006–2007	VfL Trier 1912		

International career
1981–1985	Poland	28	(1)
Medal record
Men's football
Representing Poland
FIFA World Cup
Third place	1982 Spain
- * Club domestic league appearances and goals

Jan Jałocha (born 18 July 1957) is a Polish former professional footballer.

He played mostly for Wisła Kraków. He made 234 league appearances for the club, and scored 19 goals.

Jałocha earned 28 caps and scored once for the Poland national team) and was a participant at the 1982 FIFA World Cup, where Poland won the bronze medal. He was injured in the match with Peru and was replaced in the first squad by Marek Dziuba.

He is the uncle of Marcin Jałocha.

== Honours ==
Wisła Kraków

- Ekstraklasa: 1977–78

Poland

- FIFA World Cup third place: 1982
