= Alain Eyobo =

Cameroonian footballer (born 1961)

Oscar Alain Eyobo Makongo
Personal information
- Full name: Oscar Alain Eyobo Makongo
- Date of birth: 17 October 1961 (age 65)
- Place of birth: Douala, Cameroon
- Position: Forward

Senior career*
Years	Team	Apps	(Gls)
1981–1985	Dynamo Douala		
1985–1987	Union Douala		
1990–1991	Boluspor	3	(0)
1995	CS Moulien		

International career
1978–1984	Cameroon		
Medal record
Men's football
Representing Cameroon
Africa Cup of Nations
Winner	1984 Ivory Coast
- * Club domestic league appearances and goals

Oscar Alain Eyobo Makongo (born 17 October 1961 in Douala) is a retired Cameroonian professional football forward. He played for multiple clubs throughout Africa and Europe.

== Club career ==
Eyobo played for Dynamo Douala and Union Douala in Cameroon. He had a brief spell with Boluspor in the Turkish Super Lig.

Eyobo played in the CONCACAF Champions' Cup 1995 with CS Moulien of Guadeloupe, who reached but finished last in the final round.

== International career ==
Eyobo played for the full Cameroon national football team. He was included in the squad at the 1982 FIFA World Cup finals, but did not appear in any matches.

Eyobo also played at the 1981 FIFA World Youth Championship in Australia.

== Honours ==
Cameroon

- African Cup of Nations: 1984
