= Elie Onana =

Cameroonian footballer (1951–2018)

Personal information
- Full name: Elie Onana Eloundou
- Date of birth: 13 October 1951
- Place of birth: Okola, Cameroon
- Date of death: 2 April 2018 (aged 66)
- Place of death: Yaoundé, Cameroon

International career
Years	Team	Apps	(Gls)
- Cameroon
Medal record
Men's football
Representing Cameroon
Africa Cup of Nations
Winner	1984 Ivory Coast

Elie Onana Eloundou (13 October 1951 – 2 April 2018) was a Cameroonian professional footballer who played as a midfielder. He competed for the Cameroon national team at the 1982 FIFA World Cup finals.

== Honours ==
Cameroon

- African Cup of Nations: 1984
