= Salvador Salguero =

Peruvian footballer (born 1951)

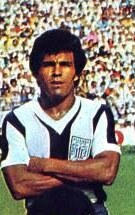
- Salguero in 1976

Personal information
- Full name: Rafael Salvador Salguero González
- Date of birth: 10 August 1951 (age 75)
- Place of birth: Lima, Peru
- Position: Defender

Senior career*
Years	Team	Apps	(Gls)
1973	Melgar		
1974	Piérola		
1975–1983	Alianza Lima		
1984	Diablos Rojos		
1985	Juventud La Joya		

International career^{‡}
1976–1982	Peru	13	(0)
- * Club domestic league appearances and goals as of 15 May 2016 ‡ National team caps and goals as of 15 May 2016

Rafael Salvador Salguero González (born 10 August 1951 in Lima, Peru) is a Peruvian retired football defender. He competed for the Peru national football team at the 1982 FIFA World Cup.

== Club career ==
At club level he played for Alianza Lima in Peru.

== International career ==
Salguero made 13 appearances for the Peru national football team.

== Career statistics ==
=== International ===
Appearances and goals by national team and year
National team	Year	Apps	Goals
Peru	1976	1	0
Peru	1977	2	0
Peru	1978	–	
Peru	1979	4	0
Peru	1980	–	
Peru	1981	2	0
Peru	1982	4	0
Total		13	0

== See also ==
- 1982 FIFA World Cup squads
