= Óscar Arizaga =

Peruvian footballer (1957–2023)

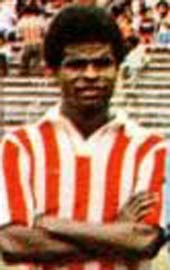

Personal information
- Full name: Óscar Filiberto Arizaga Guzmán
- Date of birth: 20 August 1957
- Place of birth: Callao, Peru
- Date of death: 26 June 2023 (aged 65)
- Place of death: Callao, Peru
- Position: Midfielder

Senior career*
Years	Team	Apps	(Gls)
1978–1982	Atlético Chalaco		

International career
1980	Peru	1	(0)
- * Club domestic league appearances and goals

Óscar Filiberto Arizaga Guzmán (20 August 1957 – 26 June 2023) was a Peruvian footballer who played as a midfielder for Peru in the 1982 FIFA World Cup. He also played for Atlético Chalaco.

Arizaga played in central midfield for Peru.

Arizaga died in Callao on 26 June 2023, at the age of 65.
