= Jorge Olaechea =

Peruvian footballer (born 1956)

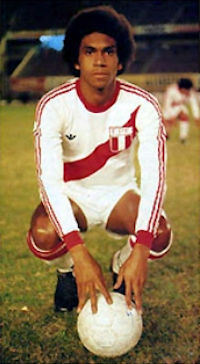

Personal information
- Full name: Jorge Andrés Olaechea Quijandría
- Date of birth: 27 August 1956 (age 70)
- Place of birth: Ica, Department of Ica, Peru
- Height: 1.77 m (5 ft 10 in)
- Position: Defender

Senior career*
Years	Team	Apps	(Gls)
1975–1977	José Carlos Mariátegui		
1978–1983	Alianza Lima		
1983–1986	Independiente Medellín	141	(26)
1987–1988	Deportivo Cali	80	(8)
1989–1990	Sporting Cristal		
1991–1992	Bolívar		
–1996	Deportivo Municipal		

International career
1979–1989	Peru	60	(2)
- * Club domestic league appearances and goals as of April 2008

Jorge Andrés Olaechea Quijandría (born August 27, 1956 in Ica) is a former Peruvian football defender who played 60 times for the Peru national team between 1979 and 1989.

== Career ==
Olaechea played professional club football in Peru, Colombia and Bolivia. He helped José Carlos Mariátegui de Ica reach the finals of the 1978 Copa Perú before transferring to Alianza Lima.

Olaechea represented Peru at the 1982 FIFA World Cup and four Copa América 1979 1983 1987 and 1989.
