= Eusebio Acasuzo =

Peruvian footballer (born 1952)

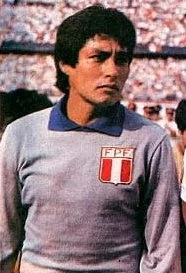

Personal information
- Full name: Eusebio Alfredo Acasuzo Colán
- Date of birth: 8 April 1952 (age 74)
- Place of birth: Lima, Peru
- Height: 1.84 m (6 ft 0 in)
- Position: Goalkeeper

Senior career*
Years	Team	Apps	(Gls)
1972–1976	Unión Huaral		
1977–1984	Universitario		
1985–1986	Bolívar		

International career
1979–1985	Peru	30	(0)
- * Club domestic league appearances and goals

Eusebio Alfredo Acasuzo Colán (Spanish: Eusebio Acasuzo, born 8 April 1952) is a retired Peruvian professional football goalkeeper.

== Career ==
At club level, he played for Universitario de Deportes in Peru. Later, he played for Club Bolívar. Acasuzo made 30 appearances for the Peru national football team. He was a playing member of Peru's squad at the 1982 FIFA World Cup.
