= Jacques N'Guea =

Cameroonian footballer (1955–2022)

Jacques N'Guea Énongué
Personal information
- Date of birth: 8 November 1955
- Place of birth: Loum, French Cameroon
- Date of death: 31 May 2022 (aged 66)
- Place of death: Yaoundé, Cameroon
- Position: Forward

Senior career*
Years	Team	Apps	(Gls)
- Ouragan de Loum
- Canon Yaoundé

International career
1977–1984	Cameroon		
Medal record
Men's football
Representing Cameroon
Africa Cup of Nations
Winner	1984 Ivory Coast
- * Club domestic league appearances and goals

Jacques N'Guea Énongué (8 November 1955 – 31 May 2022) was a Cameroonian footballer who played as a forward. He appeared internationally for the Cameroon national team between 1977 and 1984, participating in Cameroon's first FIFA World Cup in 1982 and its win of the 1984 African Cup of Nations. At club level, he played for Ouragan de Loum and Canon Yaoundé.

== Death ==
N'Guea died in Yaoundé on 31 May 2022, aged 66, after a long illness.

== Honours ==
Cameroon

- African Cup of Nations: 1984
