= Miguel Gutiérrez (footballer, born 1956) =

Peruvian footballer

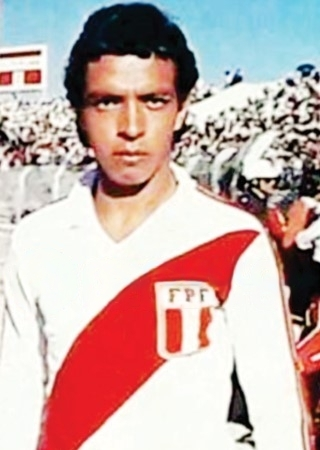

Personal information
- Full name: Miguel Ángel Gutiérrez La Rosa
- Date of birth: 19 November 1956 (age 69)
- Place of birth: Peru
- Position: Midfielder

Senior career*
Years	Team	Apps	(Gls)
1979–1983	Sporting Cristal		
1985	Universitario		

International career
1980–1984	Peru	7	(0)
- * Club domestic league appearances and goals

Miguel Ángel Gutiérrez La Rosa (born 19 November 1956) is a Peruvian football midfielder who played for Peru in the 1982 FIFA World Cup. He also played for Sporting Cristal.
