= Marek Kusto =

Polish footballer and manager

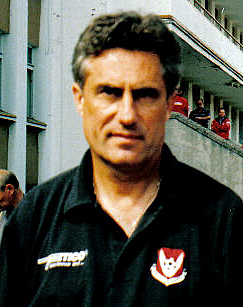
- Kusto in 2007

Personal information
- Full name: Marek Andrzej Kusto
- Date of birth: 29 April 1954 (age 72)
- Place of birth: Bochnia, Poland
- Height: 1.80 m (5 ft 11 in)
- Position: Striker

Senior career*
Years	Team	Apps	(Gls)
1971–1972	Wawel Kraków		
1972–1977	Wisła Kraków	112	(20)
1977–1982	Legia Warsaw	131	(37)
1982–1990	Beveren	232	(38)
1990–1991	KAV Dendermonde	28	(5)

International career
1974–1984	Poland	19	(3)

Managerial career
- 1993–1994: Wisła Kraków
- 1994: Wisła Kraków
- 1996–1997: Huragan Waksmund
- 1999–2000: Wisła Kraków
- 2001: Widzew Łódź
- 2001–2003: Arka Gdynia
- 2004–2005: BKS Bochnia
- 2007: BKS Bochnia
- 2008: Limanovia Limanowa
Medal record
Men's football
Representing Poland
FIFA World Cup
Third place	1974 West Germany
FIFA World Cup
Third place	1982 Spain
- * Club domestic league appearances and goals

Marek Andrzej Kusto (born 29 April 1954) is a Polish former professional football manager and player.

He played for several domestic and foreign clubs, including Wisła Kraków, Legia Warsaw and KSK Beveren (Belgium), and for the Poland national team, participating in three consecutive World Cups: the 1974 FIFA World Cup, where Poland won the bronze medal; the 1978 FIFA World Cup; and 1982 FIFA World Cup, where Poland again won the bronze medal.

He later worked as a coach for such clubs as Wisła Kraków, Widzew Łódź and Arka Gdynia, among others.

== Honours ==
Legia Warsaw

- Polish Cup: 1979–80, 1980–81

Beveren

- Belgian First Division: 1983–84
- Belgian Cup: 1982–83
- Belgian Supercup: 1984

Poland

- FIFA World Cup third place: 1974, 1982
