= Ephrem M'Bom =

Cameroonian footballer (1954–2020)

Personal information
- Full name: Ephrem Marie M'Bom
- Date of birth: 18 July 1954
- Place of birth: Yaoundé, Cameroon
- Date of death: 20 September 2020 (aged 66)
- Place of death: Douala, Cameroon
- Position: Leftback

Senior career*
Years	Team	Apps	(Gls)
1973–1975	Rail Douala		
1975–1976	Éclair Douala		
1976–1977	Léopard Douala		
1977–1988	Canon Yaoundé		
1988–1989	Dragon Yaoundé		

International career
1981–1984	Cameroon	7	(0)
- * Club domestic league appearances and goals

Ephrem Marie M'Bom (18 July 1954 – 20 September 2020) was a Cameroonian professional footballer. He competed for the Cameroon national football team at the 1982 FIFA World Cup.

== Club career ==
M'Bom began playing football with Rail FC of Douala in 1973 as an attacking player. He would move to left back in 1975, and play as a defender for Eclair Douala, Léoprad Douala, Canon Yaoundé and Dragon Yaoundé until he retired in 1989. Nicknamed Wire due to his slender build, he won five league titles with Canon as well as two Champions Cups and a Cup Winners Cup.

== International career ==
M'Bom made several appearances for the Cameroon national football team, participating in the 1982 African Cup of Nations finals.

== Personal life ==
After retiring as a player, Mbom worked for the national railway company. He died on September 20, 2020, at the age of 66 from a tumor in his leg.

== Honours ==
- Cameroonian Championship: 5

1979, 1980, 1982, 1985, 1986

- Cameroonian Cup: 3

1978, 1983, 1986

- African Champions' Cup: 2

1978, 1980

- African Cup Winners' Cup: 1

1979
