= Tadeusz Dolny =

Polish footballer (born 1958)

Personal information
- Full name: Tadeusz Benedykt Dolny
- Date of birth: 7 May 1958 (age 68)
- Place of birth: Sobótka, Poland
- Height: 1.88 m (6 ft 2 in)
- Position: Defender

Youth career
- 1971–1973: Ślęża Sobótka
- 1974–1976: Walka Zabrze

Senior career*
Years	Team	Apps	(Gls)
1976–1984	Górnik Zabrze	148	(15)
1984–1987	Górnik Wałbrzych	73	(5)
1987–1989	Odra Wodzisław Śląski		
1989	SAC Wisła Chicago		
1990	Royal-Wawel Chicago		

International career
1981–1985	Poland	7	(0)
Medal record
Men's football
Representing Poland
FIFA World Cup
Third place	1982 Spain
- * Club domestic league appearances and goals

Tadeusz Benedykt Dolny (born 7 May 1958) is a Polish former footballer who played as a defender.

He played for a few clubs, including Górnik Zabrze and Górnik Wałbrzych.

He played in the Poland national team (7 matches) and was a participant at the 1982 FIFA World Cup, where Poland won the bronze medal.

== Honours ==
Poland

- FIFA World Cup third place: 1982
