= Rubén Toribio Díaz =

Peruvian footballer (born 1952)

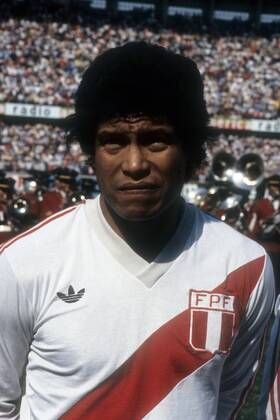
- Díaz in 1978

Personal information
- Full name: Ruben Toribio Díaz Rivas
- Date of birth: April 17, 1952 (age 74)
- Place of birth: Lima, Lima Province, Peru
- Height: 1.77 m (5 ft 9 1/2 in)
- Position: Defender

Senior career*
Years	Team	Apps	(Gls)
1972–1973	Deportivo Municipal		
1974–1976	Universitario		
1977–1986	Sporting Cristal		

International career
1972–1985	Peru	89	(2)
- * Club domestic league appearances and goals as of April 2008

Rubén Toribio Díaz Rivas (born 17 April 1952) is a retired professional footballer from Peru who played as a defender.

== Club career ==
Díaz played for Deportivo Municipal, Universitario de Deportes and Sporting Cristal in Peru. During his time with Sporting Cristal he was part of three league championship winning campaigns (1979, 1980 & 1983).

== International career ==
He competed for the Peru national football team at the 1978 and 1982 FIFA World Cup. He was part of the Peru team that won the Copa América in 1975. He made a total of 89 appearances for Peru, making him the 10th most capped player for the Peru team (as of April 2021).
