= Ramón Quiroga =

Peruvian footballer and coach (born 1950)

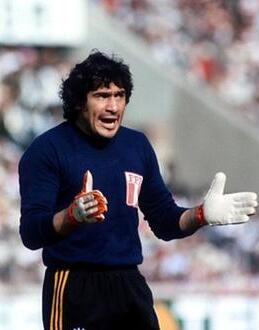
- Quiroga in 1978

Personal information
- Full name: Ramón Quiroga Arancibia
- Date of birth: 23 July 1950 (age 76)
- Place of birth: Rosario, Argentina
- Height: 1.77 m (5 ft 10 in)
- Position: Goalkeeper

Senior career*
Years	Team	Apps	(Gls)
1968–1973	Rosario Central	30	(0)
1973–1975	Sporting Cristal		
1975–1976	Independiente	25	(0)
1976–1983	Sporting Cristal		
1983	Barcelona SC		
1984	CNI		
1985–1986	Universitario		

International career
1977–1985	Peru	40	(0)

Managerial career
- 1990–1991: Deportivo Municipal
- 1992: Cienciano
- 1993: Deportivo Sipesa
- 1993: Universitario
- 1994: León de Huánuco
- 1995: Alianza Atlético
- 1995: Deportivo Marsa
- 1996–1998: Cienciano
- 1998–1999: Deportivo Municipal
- 2000: Aviación-FAP
- 2001: Unión Minas
- 2002: Sport Coopsol
- 2003: Universitario
- 2011: Pacífico FC
- * Club domestic league appearances and goals

Ramón Quiroga Arancibia (born 23 July 1950) is a former football player and coach who played as a goalkeeper. Born in Argentina, he obtained 40 caps playing for the Peru national football team.

== Club career ==
He began his career at Rosario Central, where he played 30 matches between 1970 and 1971 and won the 1970 Argentine championship. In 1972, he joined Sporting Cristal in Peru to cover for the absence of goalkeeper Luis Rubiños, winning the Peruvian championship that same year. He returned to Argentina in 1976 to play for Independiente (appearing in 25 matches) and won the 1976 Copa Interamericana.

He went back to Peru in 1977, where he won two consecutive league titles (1979 and 1980) with Sporting Cristal. In 1983, he moved to Ecuador to play for Barcelona S.C.. He returned to Peru for good in 1984; after a year with CNI of Iquitos, he concluded his career at Universitario de Deportes in 1986, having won the league title there in 1985.

== International career ==
Quiroga is perhaps best remembered for his appearance at the 1978 FIFA World Cup in a match against Poland, when he ran all the way to the opposition half and fouled Grzegorz Lato, receiving a yellow card in the process. In that tournament, he also conceded 6 goals in the match against Argentina, the country of his birth.
