= Andrzej Pałasz =

Polish footballer

Personal information
- Date of birth: 22 July 1960 (age 66)
- Place of birth: Zabrze, Poland
- Height: 1.70 m (5 ft 7 in)
- Position: Midfielder

Senior career*
Years	Team	Apps	(Gls)
1977–1987	Górnik Zabrze	225	(39)
1987–1989	Hannover 96	40	(1)
1989–1992	Bursaspor		
1992–1993	TSV Bayer Dormagen		

International career
1980–1986	Poland	35	(7)

Managerial career
- 1992: TSV Bayer Dormagen
- 2018–: SC Kapellen-Erft U19
Medal record
Men's football
Representing Poland
FIFA World Cup
Third place	1982 Spain
- * Club domestic league appearances and goals

Andrzej Pałasz (born 22 July 1960) is a Polish former professional footballer who played as a midfielder.

== Club career ==
He played mostly for Górnik Zabrze and later also briefly for Hannover 96 in Germany.

Pałasz had a spell in the Turkish Süper Lig with Bursaspor.

== International career ==
Pałasz played for the Poland national team (35 matches/7 goals) and was a participant at the 1982 FIFA World Cup, where Poland won the bronze medal, and at the 1986 FIFA World Cup.

Pałasz also played at the 1979 FIFA World Youth Championship in Japan.

== Career statistics ==
=== International ===
Appearances and goals by national team and year
National team	Year	Apps	Goals
Poland	1980	11	1
Poland	1981	3	1
Poland	1982	2	0
Poland	1983	2	0
Poland	1984	5	2
Poland	1985	11	3
Total		34	7

Scores and results list Poland's goal tally first, score column indicates score after each Pałasz goal.

List of international goals scored by Andrzej Pałasz
No.	Date	Venue	Opponent	Score	Result	Competition
1	27 February 1980	Al-Shaab Stadium, Baghdad, Iraq	Iraq	1–0	1–1	Friendly
2	18 November 1981	Władysław Król Municipal Stadium, Łódź, Poland	Spain	1–1	2–3	Friendly
3	12 March 1984	Helsinki Olympic Stadium, Helsinki, Finland	Finland	2–0	2–0	Friendly
4	31 October 1984	Stadion Stali Mielec, Mielec, Poland	Albania	2–2	2–2	1986 FIFA World Cup qualification
5	10 February 1985	Estadio El Campín, Bogotá, Colombia	Colombia	1–0	2–1	Friendly
6	10 February 1985	Estadio El Campín, Bogotá, Colombia	Colombia	2–1	2–1	Friendly
7	17 April 1985	Stadion Miejski, Opole, Poland	Finland	2–1	2–1	Friendly

== Honours ==
Górnik Zabrze

- Ekstraklasa: 1984–85, 1985–86, 1986–87

Poland

- FIFA World Cup third place: 1982

Individual

- Polish Newcomer of the Year: 1979
