= Antoni Piechniczek =

Polish footballer, manager, and senator

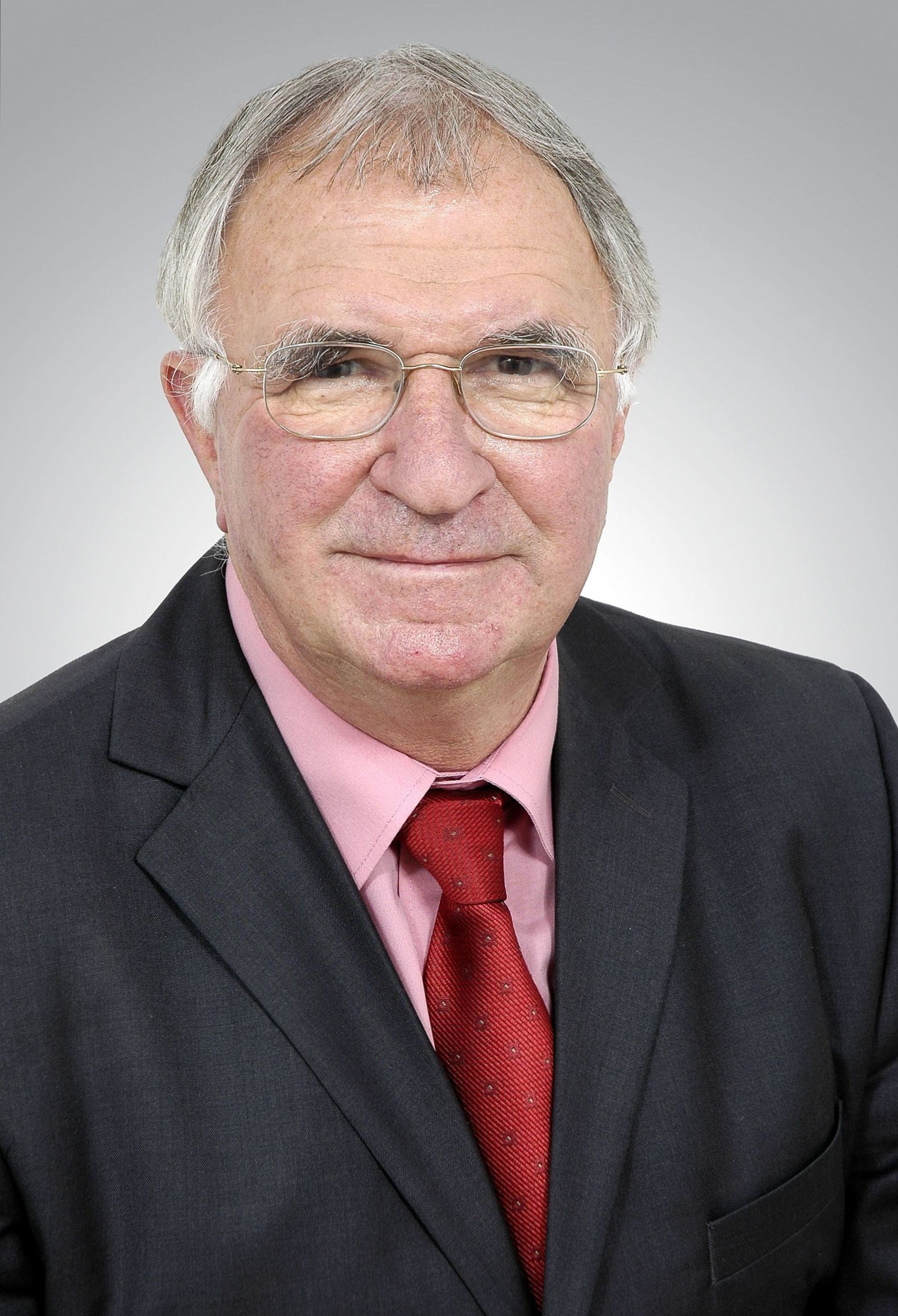

Personal information
- Full name: Antoni Krzysztof Piechniczek
- Date of birth: 3 May 1942 (age 84)
- Place of birth: Chorzów, Poland
- Position: Defender

Senior career*
Years	Team	Apps	(Gls)
–1959	Zryw Chorzów		
1960–1961	Naprzód Lipiny		
1961–1965	Legia Warsaw	56	(5)
1965–1972	Ruch Chorzów	151	(6)
1972–1973	Châteauroux		

International career
1967–1969	Poland	3	(0)

Managerial career
- 1973–1975: BKS Stal Bielsko-Biała
- 1975–1979: Odra Opole
- 1980–1981: Ruch Chorzów
- 1981–1986: Poland
- 1986–1987: Górnik Zabrze
- 1987–1990: Espérance Sportive de Tunis
- 1988: Tunisia
- 1989: Tunisia
- 1989–1990: Al Shabab Al Arabi
- 1992–1994: United Arab Emirates
- 1996–1997: Poland
- 1997: Al Rayyan
- 1998: Al Shabab Al Arabi
Medal record
Men's football
Representing Poland (as manager)
FIFA World Cup
Bronze medal – third place	1982
- * Club domestic league appearances and goals

Antoni Krzysztof Piechniczek (born 3 May 1942) is a Polish former professional football manager and player. From 2007 to 2011 he was a senator.

== Playing career ==
Piechniczek was born in Chorzów. He played for clubs such as Naprzód Lipiny, Legia Warsaw, Ruch Chorzów and LB Châteauroux. He was also capped thrice for the Poland national team.

== Managerial career ==
As a manager, he has led teams such as Ruch Chorzów, Górnik Zabrze, Al Rayyan (Qatar) or Espérance Tunis (Tunisia).

He is well known for managing the Poland national team. He coached Poland from 1981 to 1986 and from 1996 to 1997. He led the national team at the 1982 FIFA World Cup, where Poland won the bronze medal, and at the 1986 FIFA World Cup.

He coached also the Tunisia and United Arab Emirates national teams.

== Political career ==
In the 2002 local election Piechniczek was elected to the Silesian Regional Assembly II Term and was one of the three Vice-Chairpersons of the assembly. In 2006 he was re-elected, but his term (Assembly III Term) was ended after one year. In 2007, Piechniczek was elected to the Senate of the Republic of Poland (upper chamber of Polish parliament) and served in his role until 2011.

== Honours ==
=== Player ===
Legia Warsaw

- Polish Cup: 1963–64

Ruch Chorzów

- Ekstraklasa: 1967–68

=== Manager ===
Odra Opole

- Polish League Cup: 1977

Poland

- FIFA World Cup third place: 1982

Górnik Zabrze

- Ekstraklasa: 1986–87

Individual

- Polish Coach of the Year: 1978

Orders

- Order of Polonia Restituta Officer's Cross: 1999
- Order of Polonia Restituta Knight's Cross: 1982

== See also ==
- National team managers with 100 or more matches
