= Guillermo La Rosa =

Peruvian footballer (born 1952)

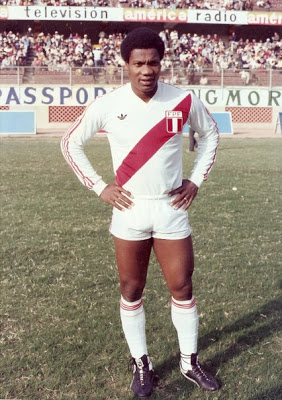
- La Rosa with Peru in 1978

Personal information
- Full name: Guillermo Claudio La Rosa Laguna
- Date of birth: June 6, 1952 (age 74)
- Place of birth: Lima, Lima Province, Peru
- Height: 1.78 m (5 ft 10 in)
- Position: Forward

Youth career
- Porvenir Miraflores

Senior career*
Years	Team	Apps	(Gls)
1973–1975	Defensor Lima		
1976–1977	Sport Boys		
1978–1979	Alianza Lima		
1979–1983	Atlético Nacional	160	(50)
1984–1985	América de Cali	27	(8)
1986	Deportivo Pereira	29	(5)
1987	Cúcuta Deportivo	6	(0)
1988–1989	LDU Quito		

International career
1973–1982	Peru	39	(3)
- * Club domestic league appearances and goals as of January 2009

Guillermo Claudio La Rosa Laguna (born June 6, 1952) is a Peruvian former professional footballer who played as a forward.

He competed for the Peru national football team at the 1978 and 1982 FIFA World Cup, wearing the number nineteen jersey. He’s nicknamed the 'tank' for his corpulence, Guillermo La Rosa scored the last Peruvian goal for 36 years against Poland in a World Cup match in Spain 1982. The 36 year cold streak was finally broken by Andre Carrillo when Peru defeated Australia 2-0 at the 2018 FIFA World Cup held in Russia.

== Club career ==
La Rosa played for Peruvian clubs Defensor Lima, Sport Boys and Alianza Lima where he claimed the title in 1978. That year he was one of the Copa Libertadores top scorers with 8 goals. Between 1979 and 1987 he played for Atletico Nacional, America de Cali, Deportivo Pereira and Cúcuta Deportivo of Colombia.

He retired in 1989, playing for Ecuadorian club Liga de Quito, and currently works as a coach for children in a football academy in Lima.

== International career ==
La Rosa made 39 appearances for the Peru national football team. He retired from international competition after playing the 1982 FIFA World Cup.

== Honours ==
=== Titles ===
Season	Team	Title
1973	Defensor Lima	Peruvian League
1973	Peruvian national team	Bolivarian Games
1978	Alianza Lima	Peruvian League
1981	Atlético Nacional	Mustang Cup
1984	América de Cali	Mustang Cup

=== Individual ===
- 1973 Bolivarian Games Top scorer (11 goals)
- 1978 Copa Libertadores Top scorer (8 goals)

== See also ==
- 1978 FIFA World Cup squads
- 1982 FIFA World Cup squads
