= Waldemar Matysik =

Polish footballer (born 1961)

Personal information
- Full name: Waldemar Józef Matysik
- Date of birth: 27 September 1961 (age 65)
- Place of birth: Stanica, Poland
- Height: 1.77 m (5 ft 10 in)
- Position: Midfielder

Youth career
- Orzeł Stanica
- Carbo Gliwice

Senior career*
Years	Team	Apps	(Gls)
1979–1987	Górnik Zabrze	172	(7)
1987–1990	AJ Auxerre	110	(0)
1990–1993	Hamburger SV	94	(1)
1993–1994	Wuppertaler SV	35	(2)
1994–1995	VfB Wissen	26	(0)
1996–1997	Rot-Weiss Essen	49	(0)
1997	FC Germania Dattenfeld 1916		

International career
1980–1989	Poland	55	(0)
Medal record
Men's football
Representing Poland
FIFA World Cup
Third place	1982 Spain
UEFA European Under-18 Championship
Runner-up	1980 East Germany
- * Club domestic league appearances and goals

Waldemar Józef Matysik (born 27 September 1961) is a Polish former professional footballer who played as a midfielder.

He played mostly for Górnik Zabrze, where he scored seven goals in 127 matches. In 1987, he went abroad and played for AJ Auxerre in France (110 matches) and later for Hamburger SV (94 matches, one goal) in Germany. In 1993, he went to Wuppertaler SV (35 games, two goals), a year later Matysik chose VfB 1914 Wissen (26 games). His professional career ended at Rot-Weiss Essen, where during the years 1996–97 Matysik played 49 matches.

He played for the Poland national team (55 matches) and was a participant at the 1982 FIFA World Cup, where Poland won the bronze medal and at the 1986 FIFA World Cup.

== Career statistics ==
=== International ===
Appearances and goals by national team and year
National team	Year	Apps	Goals
Poland	1980	1	0
Poland	1981	9	0
Poland	1982	6	0
Poland	1983	0	0
Poland	1984	9	0
Poland	1985	14	0
Poland	1986	8	0
Poland	1987	4	0
Poland	1988	2	0
Poland	1989	2	0
Total		55	0

== Honours ==
Górnik Zabrze

- Ekstraklasa: 1984–85, 1985–86, 1986–87

Poland

- FIFA World Cup third place: 1982

Poland U18

- UEFA European Under-18 Championship runner-up: 1980

Individual

- Polish Newcomer of the Year: 1981
