= Józef Młynarczyk =

Polish footballer (born 1953)

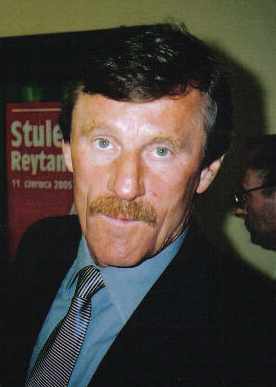
- Młynarczyk in June 2005

Personal information
- Date of birth: 20 September 1953 (age 73)
- Place of birth: Nowa Sól, Poland
- Height: 1.86 m (6 ft 1 in)
- Position: Goalkeeper

Team information
- Current team: Poland (goalkeeping coach)

Youth career
- Astra Nowa Sól

Senior career*
Years	Team	Apps	(Gls)
1971–1974	Dozamet Nowa Sól		
1974–1977	BKS Stal		
1977–1980	Odra Opole	87	(1)
1980–1984	Widzew Łódź	79	(0)
1984–1986	Bastia	56	(0)
1986–1989	Porto	67	(0)
Total		289	(1)

International career
1979–1986	Poland	42	(0)
Medal record
Men's football
Representing Poland
FIFA World Cup
Third place	1982 Spain
- * Club domestic league appearances and goals

Józef Młynarczyk (born 20 September 1953) is a Polish former professional footballer who played as a goalkeeper. He currently serves as a goalkeeping coach of the Poland national team.

After representing three clubs in his homeland he played out the remainder of his career in France and Portugal, winning seven major titles with Porto during his one-and-a-half-season spell.

Młynarczyk played more than 40 times for Poland, appearing in two World Cups with the country. In 1983, he was the winner of the Polish Footballer of the Year plebiscite organized by the Piłka Nożna football weekly.

== Club career ==
Born in Nowa Sól, Młynarczyk arrived at Widzew Łódź in 1980 aged 27, after playing for three modest clubs. During his four-year spell, in which he was equally first and second-choice, the team won two Ekstraklasa titles, finishing second in the other two. In the 1982–83 European Cup, he helped Widzew to the semifinals after edging Liverpool in the last-eight (4–3 on aggregate).

In 1984, aged 31, Młynarczyk signed with SC Bastia in France. In January 1986 he switched countries again, joining FC Porto from Portugal, where he won the European Cup, the Intercontinental Cup and the UEFA Super Cup. After an interesting battle for first-choice status with Zé Beto, he eventually became the starter – he was in goal for all of these finals – but lost his importance after the emergence of 18-year-old Vítor Baía, choosing to retire from football in June 1989.

Młynarczyk started immediately working with Porto's goalkeepers after his retirement, a position he would also hold at former side Widzew Łódź. On 21 April 2008, he resigned after the latter side hired Janusz Wójcik as manager.

== International career ==
Młynarczyk won 42 caps for Poland during seven years, the first arriving in 1979 whilst in the ranks of lowly Odra Opole. He participated – always as starter – with the national team in two FIFA World Cups, 1982 and 1986, finishing in third place in the former edition and being ousted by Brazil in the round-of-16 in the latter.

Młynarczyk would also work as goalkeeping coach for the national team, before being replaced by Jacek Kazimierski.

=== International ===
Appearances, conceded goals and clean sheets by national team
National team	Year	Apps	Conceded goals	Clean sheets
Poland	1979	1	0	1
Poland	1980	5	8	0
Poland	1981	4	7	0
Poland	1982	7	5	4
Poland	1983	6	8	0
Poland	1984	7	4	3
Poland	1985	6	4	3
Poland	1986	6	11	2
Total		42	47	13

== Honours ==
Widzew Łódź

- Ekstraklasa: 1980–81, 1981–82

Porto

- Primeira Liga: 1985–86, 1987–88
- Taça de Portugal: 1987–88
- Supertaça Cândido de Oliveira: 1986; runner-up: 1988
- European Cup: 1986–87
- Intercontinental Cup: 1987
- UEFA Super Cup: 1987

Poland

- FIFA World Cup third place: 1982

Individual

- Piłka Nożna Polish Footballer of the Year: 1983
- Polish Football Association National Team of the Century: 1919–2019
