= Jacek Kazimierski =

Polish footballer (born 1959)

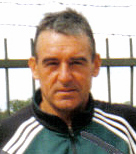

Personal information
- Date of birth: 17 August 1959 (age 67)
- Place of birth: Warsaw, Poland
- Height: 1.86 m (6 ft 1 in)
- Position: Goalkeeper

Youth career
- Agrykola Warsaw

Senior career*
Years	Team	Apps	(Gls)
1978–1987	Legia Warsaw	225	(0)
1987–1988	Olympiacos	7	(0)
1988–1991	Gent	90	(0)
Total		322	(0)

International career
1981–1987	Poland	23	(0)
Medal record
Men's football
Representing Poland
FIFA World Cup
Third place	1982 Spain
UEFA European Under-18 Championship
Third place	1978 Poland
- * Club domestic league appearances and goals

Jacek Kazimierski (born 17 August 1959) is a Polish former professional footballer who played as a goalkeeper.

He began his career in Agrykola Warsaw and later played for Legia Warsaw, Olympiacos and K.A.A. Gent. He won the Polish Cup twice in 1980 and 1981 with Legia Warsaw and appeared in 225 top-flight games. He also won the Greek Super Cup with Olympiacos in 1987.

He made 23 appearances for the Poland national team and participated at the 1982 and 1986 FIFA World Cups, winning a bronze medal in 1982.

== International ==
Appearances, conceded goals and clean sheets by national team
National team	Year	Apps	Conceded Goals	Clean Sheets
Poland	1981	4	3	2
Poland	1982	3	4	1
Poland	1983	0	0	0
Poland	1984	6	6	2
Poland	1985	3	7	0
Poland	1986	4	3	2
Poland	1987	3	2	1
Total		23	25	8

== Honours ==
Legia Warsaw

- Polish Cup: 1979–80, 1980–81

Olympiacos

- Greek Super Cup: 1987

Poland

- FIFA World Cup third place: 1982

Poland U18

- UEFA European Under-18 Championship third place: 1978
