= Stefan Majewski =

Polish footballer and manager

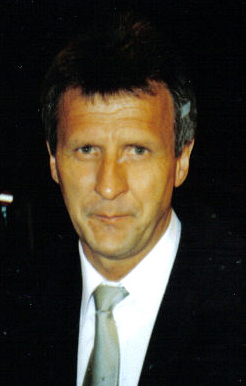

Personal information
- Date of birth: 31 January 1956 (age 70)
- Place of birth: Bydgoszcz, Poland
- Height: 1.86 m (6 ft 1 in)
- Position: Defender

Youth career
- Gwiazda Bydgoszcz
- 1971–1977: Chemik Bydgoszcz

Senior career*
Years	Team	Apps	(Gls)
1977–1978	Zawisza Bydgoszcz		
1979–1984	Legia Warsaw	158	(16)
1985–1987	1. FC Kaiserslautern	63	(1)
1987–1988	Arminia Bielefeld	34	(1)
1988–1989	Apollon Limassol		
1989–1993	Freiburger FC		

International career
1978–1986	Poland	40	(4)

Managerial career
- 1994: Polonia Warsaw
- 1995–1996: Polonia Warsaw
- 1997–1999: 1. FC Kaiserslautern II
- 1999–2001: Amica Wronki
- 2001: Zagłębie Lubin
- 2002: Świt Nowy Dwór Mazowiecki
- 2003–2004: Amica Wronki
- 2004–2006: Widzew Łódź
- 2006–2008: Cracovia
- 2009–2010: Poland U23
- 2009: Poland (caretaker)
- 2010–2012: Poland U21
Medal record
Men's football
Representing Poland
FIFA World Cup
Third place	1982 Spain
- * Club domestic league appearances and goals

Stefan Majewski (born 31 January 1956) is a Polish professional football manager and former player who was most recently the sporting director of Ekstraklasa club Cracovia.

== Club career ==
Majewski was born in Bydgoszcz. He played for clubs such as Gwiazda Bydgoszcz, Zawisza Bydgoszcz, Legia Warsaw, 1. FC Kaiserslautern (West Germany), Arminia Bielefeld (West Germany) or Apollon Limassol (Cyprus).

== International career ==
Most notably, he also played for the Poland national team, for which he played 40 matches and scored four goals. Majewski was a participant at the 1982 FIFA World Cup, where Poland won the third place, and at the 1986 FIFA World Cup.

== Coaching career ==
Majewski later pursued a coaching career, he coached the team of Widzew Łódź in 2004–06. Between 2 October 2006 and 27 October 2008, he was the coach of Cracovia. On 18 September 2009, Majewski became the interim caretaker coach/manager for the Poland national football team following the dismissal of his predecessor Leo Beenhakker. Poland lost 2–0 to the Czech Republic in a 2010 World Cup qualifier match during his debutant match as the head coach. On 29 October 2009, Franciszek Smuda was named as the full-time coach of the team, meaning that Majewski's stint as caretaker manager was effectively over.

== Career statistics ==
=== International ===
Appearances and goals by national team and year
National team	Year	Apps	Goals
Poland	1978	4	1
Poland	1979	6	0
Poland	1980	3	0
Poland	1981	4	1
Poland	1982	10	1
Poland	1983	6	1
Poland	1984	1	0
Poland	1985	0	0
Poland	1986	6	0
Total		40	4

== Honours ==
=== Player ===
Legia Warsaw

- Polish Cup: 1979–80, 1980–81

Poland

- FIFA World Cup third place: 1982

=== Manager ===
Amica Wronki

- Polish Cup: 1998–99, 1999–2000
- Polish Super Cup: 1999
