= Marek Dziuba =

Polish footballer and manager

Personal information
- Date of birth: 19 December 1955 (age 70)
- Place of birth: Łódź, Poland
- Height: 1.76 m (5 ft 9 1/2 in)
- Position: Defender

Youth career
- ŁKS Łódź
- Łodzianka Łódź

Senior career*
Years	Team	Apps	(Gls)
1973–1984	ŁKS Łódź	280	(12)
1984–1987	Widzew Łódź	84	(3)
1987–1992	Sint-Truidense VV	113	(0)
Total		477	(15)

International career
1977–1984	Poland	53	(1)

Managerial career
- 1991–1992: Sint-Truidense VV (player-manager)
- 1993–1995: Ceramika Opoczno
- 1996–1997: ŁKS Łódź
- 1998: ŁKS Łódź
- 1998–1999: Widzew Łódź
- 2002–2005: Włókniarz Konstantynów Łódzki
- 2006–2008: Start Brzeziny
- 2010: Pogoń Zduńska Wola
- 2010–2011: KS Paradyż
Medal record
Men's football
Representing Poland
FIFA World Cup
Third place	1982 Spain
- * Club domestic league appearances and goals

Marek Dziuba (born 19 December 1955) is a Polish former professional footballer and manager. He played for a few clubs, including ŁKS Łódź and Widzew Łódź.

Dziuba played for Poland national team, for which he played 53 matches and scored one goal. He was a participant at the 1982 FIFA World Cup, where Poland won the bronze medal.

He later worked as a football manager, and was in charge of his former teams ŁKS Łódź and Widzew Łódź.

== Career statistics ==
=== International ===
Appearances and goals by national team and year
National team	Year	Apps	Goals
Poland	1977	8	0
Poland	1978	0	0
Poland	1979	10	0
Poland	1980	18	1
Poland	1981	8	0
Poland	1982	6	0
Poland	1983	1	0
Poland	1984	2	0
Total		53	1

== Honours ==
=== Player ===
Widzew Łódź

- Polish Cup: 1984–85

Poland

- FIFA World Cup third place: 1982

=== Manager ===
ŁKS Łódź

- Ekstraklasa: 1997–98
