= Włodzimierz Ciołek =

Polish footballer (born 1956)

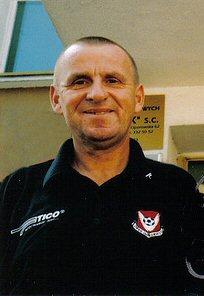

Personal information
- Date of birth: 24 March 1956 (age 70)
- Place of birth: Wałbrzych, Poland
- Height: 1.67 m (5 ft 6 in)
- Position: Striker

Senior career*
Years	Team	Apps	(Gls)
1977–1978	Górnik Wałbrzych		
1978–1983	Stal Mielec	144	(23)
1983–1987	Górnik Wałbrzych	99	(34)
1987–1990	FC Grenchen		

International career
1978–1985	Poland	29	(4)
Medal record
Men's football
Representing Poland
FIFA World Cup
Third place	1982 Spain
- * Club domestic league appearances and goals

Włodzimierz Ciołek (born 24 March 1956) is a Polish former professional footballer who played as a striker.

He played for clubs such as Górnik Wałbrzych and Stal Mielec. In the 1983–84 season, when playing for Górnik, he became the top league scorer.

He played for Poland national team, earning 29 caps and scoring four goals.

Ciołek was a participant at the 1982 FIFA World Cup, where Poland won the third place. He scored a goal against Peru.

Nowadays, Ciołek trains junior groups in Górnik Wałbrzych.

== Honours ==
Individual

- Polish Newcomer of the Year: 1978
- Ekstraklasa top scorer: 1983–84

Poland

- FIFA World Cup third place: 1982
