= Andrzej Buncol =

Polish footballer (born 1959)

Personal information
- Full name: Andrzej Bernard Buncol
- Date of birth: 21 September 1959 (age 67)
- Place of birth: Gliwice, Poland
- Height: 1.74 m (5 ft 9 in)
- Position: Midfielder

Senior career*
Years	Team	Apps	(Gls)
1977–1979	Piast Gliwice		
1979–1981	Ruch Chorzów	62	(14)
1981–1986	Legia Warsaw	126	(32)
1986–1987	FC Homburg	30	(5)
1987–1992	Bayer Leverkusen	123	(14)
1992–1997	Fortuna Düsseldorf	119	(17)

International career
1980–1986	Poland	51	(6)
Medal record
Men's football
Representing Poland
FIFA World Cup
Third place	1982 Spain
UEFA European Under-18 Championship
Third place	1978 Poland
- * Club domestic league appearances and goals

Andrzej Bernard Buncol (born 21 September 1959) is a Polish former professional footballer who played as a midfielder.

== Club career ==
He played for clubs such as Ruch Chorzów and Legia Warsaw in Poland. In the (West) German top-flight he made over 180 appearances for FC 08 Homburg, Bayer 04 Leverkusen and Fortuna Düsseldorf.

== International career ==
He played for the Poland national team. Buncol who won 51 caps was a participant at the 1982 FIFA World Cup (where Poland won third place) and the 1986 FIFA World Cup. After the 1986 World Cup, he emigrated to West Germany.

== Career statistics ==
=== International ===
Appearances and goals by national team and year
National team	Year	Apps	Goals
Poland	1980	2	0
Poland	1981	7	3
Poland	1982	10	2
Poland	1983	5	0
Poland	1984	10	1
Poland	1985	12	0
Poland	1986	5	0
Total		51	6

== Honours ==
Piast Gliwice

- Polish Cup runner-up: 1977–78

Bayer 04 Leverkusen

- UEFA Cup: 1987–88

Fortuna Düsseldorf

- Oberliga Nordrhein: 1993–94

Poland

- FIFA World Cup third place: 1982
- Nehru Cup: 1984

Poland U18

- UEFA European Under-18 Championship third place: 1978

Individual

- Polish Newcomer of the Year: 1982
