= Argentina v Peru (1978 FIFA World Cup) =

1978 FIFA World Cup match

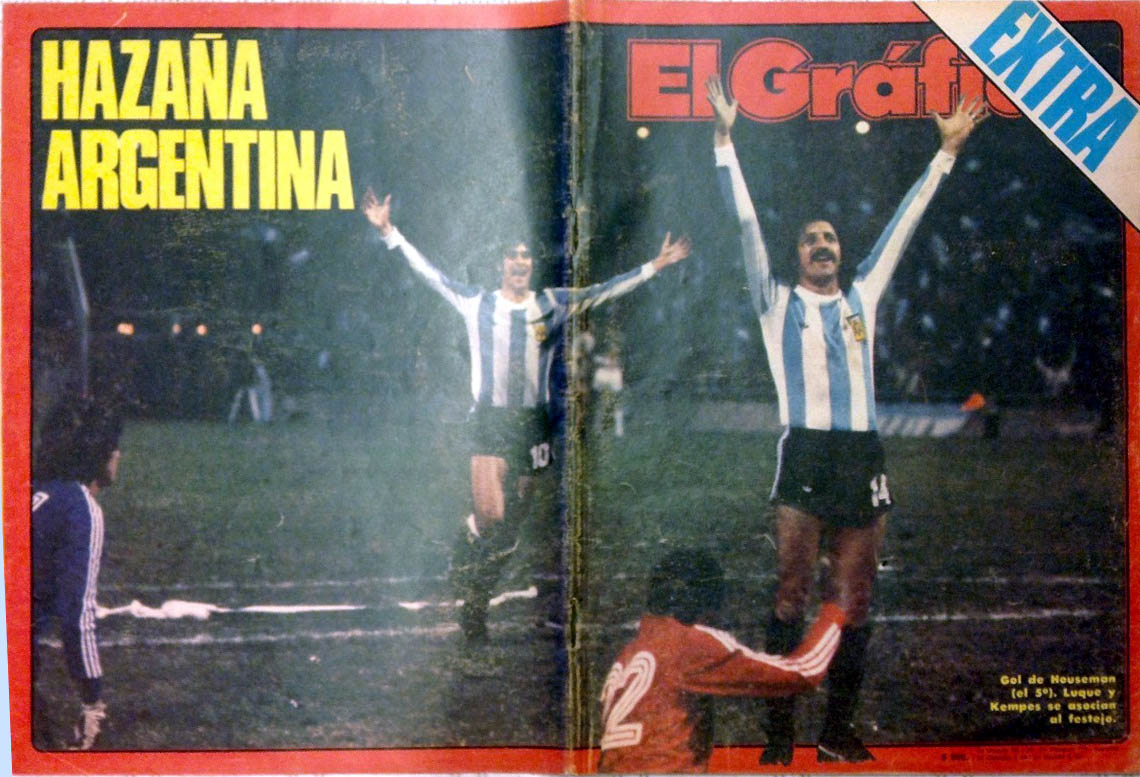
- Cover of Argentine magazine El Gráfico which titled "Argentine achievement" to describe the match
- Event: 1978 FIFA World Cup
Argentina	Peru
(Argentina)	(Peru)
6	0
- Argentina advances to the final Peru eliminated from the 1978 FIFA World Cup
- Date: 21 June 1978
- Venue: Estadio Gigante de Arroyito, Rosario, Santa Fe, Argentina
- Referee: Robert Wurtz (France)
- Attendance: 37,315

Argentina 6–0 Peru was a football match between Argentina and Peru that took place on 21 June 1978 during the 1978 FIFA World Cup within Group B. In order to advance to the final ahead of Brazil by goal difference, host nation Argentina needed to win by three or four goals, depending on the number of goals scored. The match ended in a 6–0 Argentine victory with two goals from Mario Kempes, two goals from Leopoldo Luque, one goal by Alberto Tarantini and one from René Houseman. The 1978 World Cup concluded with Argentina earning their first championship title after beating the Netherlands 3–1. The match remains one of the most controversial in World Cup history as it has been speculated that there was some collusion in favour of Argentina, due to the tournament taking place during the military dictatorship of the National Reorganization Process under Jorge Rafael Videla, which in turn led to suspicion that the World Cup was being used as an attempt to appease the international community in the face of human rights violations.

Over the years, players, journalists, and politicians have put forward a variety of interpretations regarding possible outside interference to benefit Argentina in the match, but none has gained widespread acceptance. The former Argentine Minister of Finance, Juan Alemann, claimed that a bomb detonated when Argentina scored the fourth goal needed to qualify. Peruvian players have given different versions of what happened, with some alleging that irregularities occurred before and during the match, such as Videla's visit to their locker room, while others deny any type of arrangement and claim that Argentina was simply vastly superior to Peru during the match.

FIFA arranged for the Brazil–Poland match to be played before Argentina–Peru, citing television and ticket sales issues. Match times had been agreed long before the start of the World Cup. Brazil, Argentina's arch-rival, objected to the measure, since Argentina would know in advance the number of goals they had to score. FIFA generally held the matches of the same group on different days or times, but it was not unusual for matches of the same group to be played simultaneously. After the Disgrace of Gijón at the next World Cup, the defining fixtures of each group have always been played simultaneously to remove any advantage that teams may get from playing at different times.

== Background ==
=== Argentina ===
Argentina was runner-up in the 1930 FIFA World Cup held in Uruguay where the host country won the title 4–2. After that, the furthest Argentina had gone in a World Cup was the quarter-finals at the 1966 World Cup held in England when Argentina lost 0–1 against England when Antonio Ubaldo Rattín was sent off after insulting the referee despite the fact that he did not understand Spanish. Regardless, Argentina qualified in all World Cups except for the 1970 tournament in Mexico and declined to participate in 1938, 1950 and 1954. Due to being the hosts of the 1978 World Cup, Argentina did not have to qualify.

Argentina had also won the Copa América in 1921, 1925, 1927, 1929, 1937, 1941, 1945, 1946, 1947, 1955, 1957 and 1959 and the champions of the 1960 Panamerican Championship and runners-up in 1916, 1917, 1920, 1923, 1924, 1926, 1935, 1942, 1959 extra (South American championship) and 1967. At the Olympic Games, the senior team achieved its greatest achievement at the 1928 Summer Olympics, winning the silver medal (after losing the gold medal also for the Uruguay).

=== Peru ===
Peru participated in the 1930 World Cup but were eliminated in the first round. They wouldn't participate again until 1970 where they obtained the Fair Play Award and reached the quarter-finals, losing to the eventual champions Brazil 4–2. This would remain the furthest Peru has reached in a World Cup. In 1978, they qualified again for the World Cup finals, after failing to qualify for the 1974 edition.

Peru was crowned champion of the Copa América in 1939 and 1975.

==== Peruvian Qualification for the 1978 World Cup ====
Rank	Team	Pts	Pld	W	D	L	GF	GA	GD
1	Peru	6	4	2	2	0	8	2	+6
2	Chile	5	4	2	1	1	5	3	+2
3	Ecuador	1	4	0	1	3	1	9	−8

Score			Location	Stadium	Attendance	Date
Ecuador	1–1	Peru	Quito	Atahualpa	39,576	February 20, 1977
Chile	1–1	Peru	Santiago	Nacional	67,983	March 6, 1977
Peru	4–0	Ecuador	Lima	Nacional	43,319	March 12, 1977
Peru	2–0	Chile	Lima	Nacional	62,000	March 26, 1977

- Peru advances to the final round.

In the final round of qualifications, Peru lost against Brazil by one goal but managed to beat Bolivia 5–0, allowing Peru to reach second place and successfully qualify for the 1978 FIFA World Cup.

Rank	Team	Pts	Pld	W	D	L	GF	GA	GD
1	Brazil	4	2	2	0	0	9	0	+9
2	Peru	2	2	1	0	1	5	1	+4
3	Bolivia	0	2	0	0	2	0	13	−13

Score			Location	Stadium	Attendance	Date
Brazil	1–0	Peru	Cali	Pascual Guerrero	50,345	July 10, 1977
Peru	5–0	Bolivia	Cali	Pascual Guerrero	32,511	July 17, 1977

- Brazil and Peru qualified for the 1978 World Cup.
- Bolivia went to the intercontinental playoffs.

==== Recent Match History Between Argentina and Peru ====
Matches prior to the World Cup stood out, with César Luis Menotti as technical director of Argentina. All of them ended in victory for the Argentines. These are four matches for the Copa Mariscal Ramón Castilla, a friendly tournament that was played between the two teams.

Score			Location	Date
Peru	1–3	Argentina	Lima	October 28, 1976
Argentina	1–0	Peru	Buenos Aires	November 10, 1976
Argentina	2–1	Peru	Buenos Aires	March 19, 1978
Peru	1–3	Argentina	Lima	March 23, 1978

== 1978 FIFA World Cup ==
=== Qualification for Group B ===
==== Argentina ====
Argentina qualified second in their group after beating Hungary and France by 2–1 goal margin. By the time of the third game, Argentina was already qualified together with Italy. The last game of the group was Italy-Argentina, which ended in a 1–0 victory for the Italians.

Pos	Team	Pld	W	D	L	GF	GA	GD	Pts	Qualification
1	Italy	3	3	0	0	6	2	+4	6	Advance to second round
2	Argentina	3	2	0	1	4	3	+1	4	Advance to second round
3	France	3	1	0	2	5	5	0	2	
4	Hungary	3	0	0	3	3	8	−5	0	

Source: FIFA

June 2, 1978
Italy	2–1	France	Estadio José María Minella, Mar del Plata
Argentina	2–1	Hungary	Estadio Monumental, Buenos Aires
June 6, 1978
Italy	3–1	Hungary	Estadio José María Minella, Mar del Plata
Argentina	2–1	France	Estadio Monumental, Buenos Aires
June 10, 1978
France	3–1	Hungary	Estadio José María Minella, Mar del Plata
Argentina	0–1	Italy	Estadio Monumental, Buenos Aires

==== Peru ====
Peru qualified first in their group by getting a 3–1 victory against Scotland, a 0–0 draw against the Netherlands and a 4–1 victory against Iran.

Pos	Team	Pld	W	D	L	GF	GA	GD	Pts	Qualification
1	Peru	3	2	1	0	7	2	+5	5	Advance to second round
2	Netherlands	3	1	1	1	5	3	+2	3	Advance to second round
3	Scotland	3	1	1	1	5	6	−1	3	
4	Iran	3	0	1	2	2	8	−6	1	

Source: FIFA

June 3, 1978
Peru	3–1	Scotland	Estadio Chateau Carreras, Córdoba
Netherlands	3–0	Iran	Estadio Ciudad de Mendoza, Mendoza
June 7, 1978
Scotland	1–1	Iran	Estadio Chateau Carreras, Córdoba
Netherlands	0–0	Peru	Estadio Ciudad de Mendoza, Mendoza
June 11, 1978
Peru	4–1	Iran	Estadio Chateau Carreras, Córdoba
Scotland	3–2	Netherlands	Estadio Ciudad de Mendoza, Mendoza

=== Group B ===
Argentina had qualified for the second group stage after obtaining second place in Group 1 behind Italy while Brazil had also obtained the second position of Group 3 after Austria. Both Peru and Poland had achieved first place in Group 4 and Group 2 respectively. The headquarters of this group were Mendoza and Rosario.

The first game pitted Brazil against Peru, ending with a 3–0 victory for the Brazilians. Argentina also beat Poland 2–0 in Rosario with two goals from Mario Kempes. The victory of Poland over Peru by 1–0 and the goalless draw between Argentina and Brazil left a group close in which, with the exception of Peru, the other three teams had a chance to reach the final. Argentina and Brazil reached the last game with 3 points, although the Brazilians had a greater goal difference. Poland arrived with 2 points but with chances to win the group if, after their victory, Argentina lost or tied without surpassing it in goal difference.

The matches were not played at the same time but Brazil and Poland played first at 16:45 while Argentina and Peru did so later, at 19:15. Brazil won their match 3–1, with two goals from Roberto Dinamite and one from Nelinho. With this result they finished with 5 points and +5 goal difference. In order to reach the final, Argentina had to win with a margin of four goals since they had a goal difference of +2. Argentina managed to prevail over Peru by 6–0 and thus qualified for the final.

14 June 1978
Peru	0–3	Brazil	Estadio Ciudad de Mendoza, Mendoza
Argentina	2–0	Poland	Estadio Gigante de Arroyito, Rosario
18 June 1978
Peru	0–1	Poland	Estadio Ciudad de Mendoza, Mendoza
Argentina	0–0	Brazil	Estadio Gigante de Arroyito, Rosario
21 June 1978
Poland	1–3	Brazil	Estadio Ciudad de Mendoza, Mendoza
Argentina	6–0	Peru	Estadio Gigante de Arroyito, Rosario

== Match ==
=== Details ===
21 June 1978
19:15 ART

Argentina	6–0	Peru
Kempes 21', 49'; Tarantini 43'; Luque 50', 72'; Houseman 67'

Estadio Gigante de Arroyito, Rosario
Attendance: 37,315
Referee: Robert Wurtz (France)

Argentina	Peru

GK	5	Ubaldo Fillol
RB	15	Jorge Olguín
CB	7	Luis Galván
CB	19	Daniel Passarella (c)
LB	20	Alberto Tarantini
DM	6	Américo Gallego	(substituted off) 85'
CM	12	Omar Larrosa
AM	10	Mario Kempes
RW	4	Daniel Bertoni	(substituted off) 64'
LW	16	Oscar Ortiz
CF	14	Leopoldo Luque
Substitutions:
RW	9	René Houseman	(substituted on) 64'
DM	17	Miguel Oviedo	(substituted on) 85'
Manager:
César Luis Menotti

GK	21	Ramón Quiroga
RB	2	Jaime Duarte
CB	3	Rodulfo Manzo
CB	4	Héctor Chumpitaz (c)
LB	22	Roberto Rojas
CM	17	Alfredo Quesada	(yellow card) 36'
CM	6	José Velásquez	(yellow card) 48'	(substituted off) 51'
CM	8	César Cueto
FW	7	Juan José Muñante
FW	11	Juan Carlos Oblitas
FW	10	Teófilo Cubillas
Substitutions:
FW	16	Raúl Gorriti	(substituted on) 51'
Manager:
Marcos Calderón

== Controversy ==
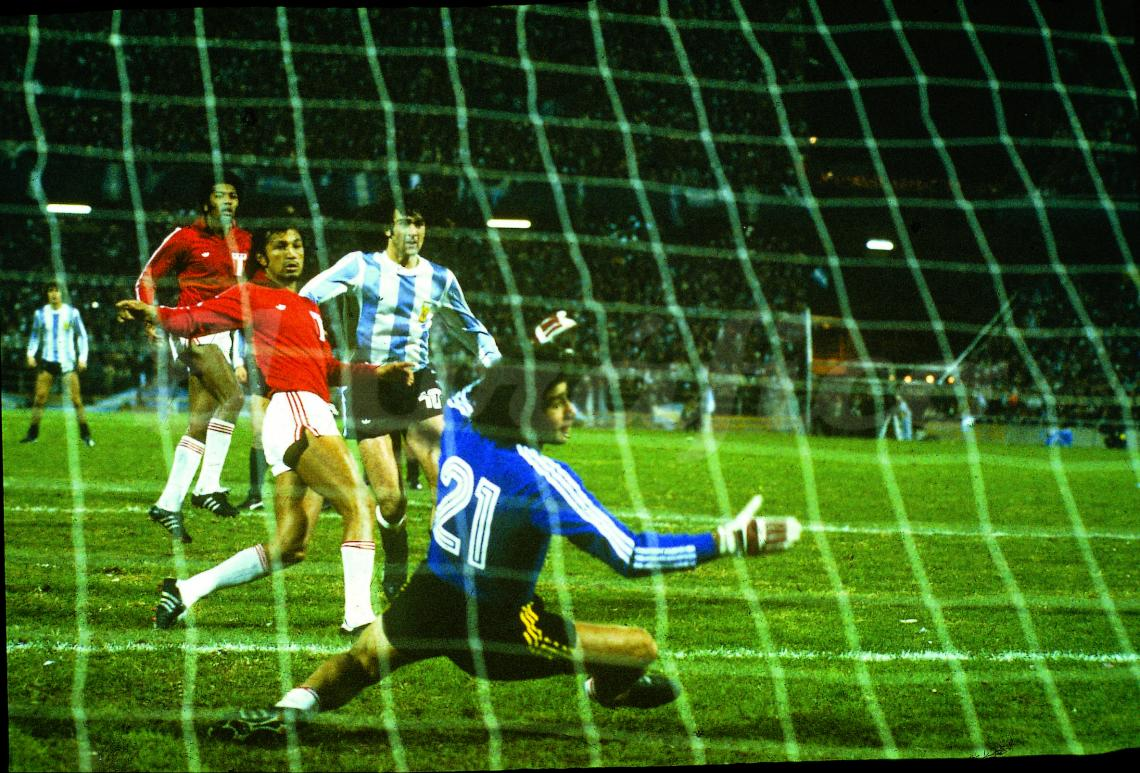
Mario Kempes scoring the 3rd. goal for Argentina

The final round of Group B games were played on June 21. The winner of the group would proceed to the World Cup Final against the winners of Group A. Brazil and Argentina were level on three points, but Brazil had a superior goal difference of +3 compared to +2 for Argentina, so Brazil were top of Group B leading into the final round.

The Brazil-Poland game was to be played first, with the Argentina-Peru starting nearly three hours later at 7.15pm. FIFA had decided prior to the tournament that Argentina would play its first and second round matches at 7:15 p.m. while the other matches, except for the opening match and the final, would be played at either 1:00 p.m. or 4:15 p.m. This was because FIFA feared that there would be low attendance at matches not involving Argentina if played simultaneously with Argentina's matches, as most tickets had been bought by locals. At the time, no one had opposed this measure, which was also granted to West Germany when they hosted the 1974 FIFA World Cup.

When it came time for the decisive group matches however, the Brazilians pushed to play their game against Poland at the same time as Argentina v Peru, arguing that by playing second the Argentine team would have an advantage as they would know what result they needed to top the group. FIFA objected to Brazil's request, arguing that it was impossible to change schedules on television. Thus Brazil played its game first and won 3–1. Argentina subsequently started their match against Peru knowing they would need to win by at least four goals against Peru, who were bottom of group B with zero points. Minutes before the game, Argentinian President Jorge Rafael Videla visited the Peruvian locker room accompanied by former American Secretary of State and organiser of Operation Condor, Henry Kissinger and read a message to the players from the Peruvian dictator Francisco Morales Bermúdez on the Argentine-Peruvian brotherhood. Argentina subsequently won the match 6–0, rising above Brazil in the Group B table on goal difference, and advancing to the final against the Netherlands.

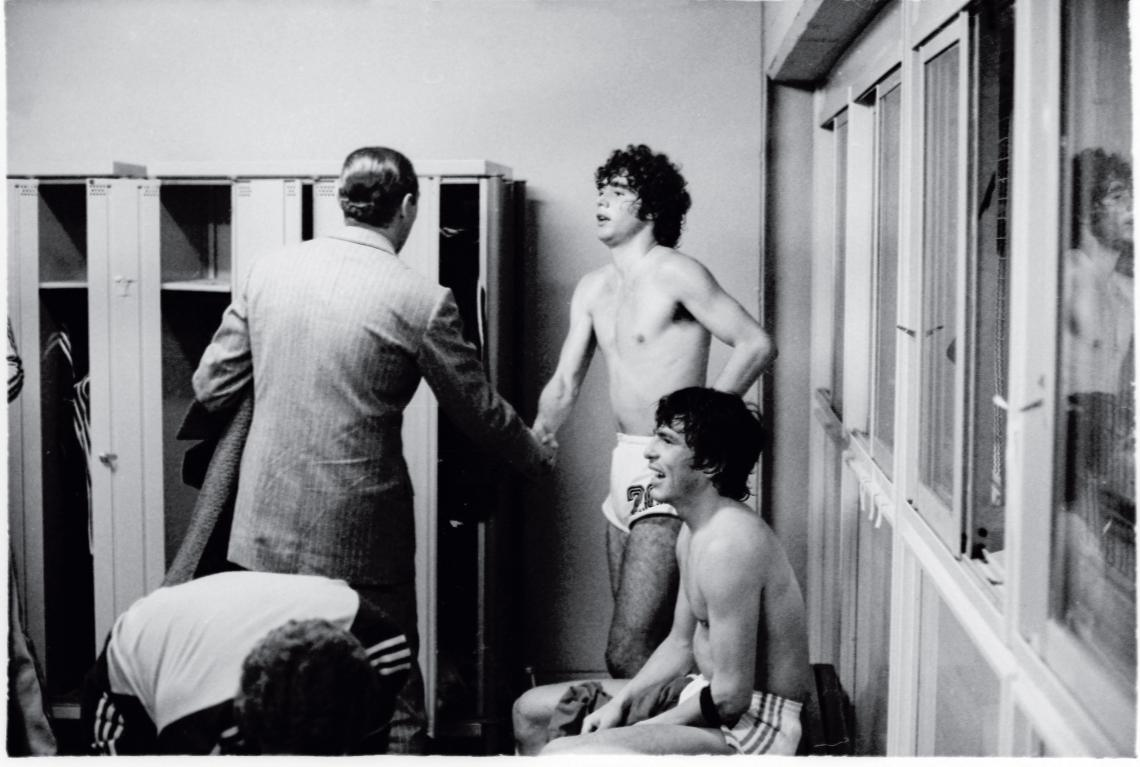
The Argentine dictator Jorge Rafael Videla visits Alberto Tarantini after the match. Videla would deny any arrangement and bribery years later

Some years later, the result and some particular circumstances during the game raised suspicions about the legitimacy of the match. Upon returning to Lima, the Peruvian team met an angry mob who threw coins, tomatoes and other objects at them, as recounted by Peruvian player Guillermo La Rosa. Ten days after the end of the World Cup, on July 6, 1978, the Argentine dictatorship sanctioned Decree No. 1463/78 "granting an extraordinary non-refundable credit to the Republic of Peru." There were also allegations that Brazil had given an economic incentive to the Peruvian players to beat Argentina, a rumour that would be defended by the Argentine player Mario Kempes as well as by the Peruvian players Teófilo Cubillas and Héctor Chumpitaz who admitted that they were going to receive a $5,000 incentive each. At the same time, there were rumours that local leaders gave Poland incentives to beat Brazil. Kempes denied that there could have been any agreement since Peru had some clear chances, including a vertical shot from the Argentine goal. Another factor of the Peruvian decline was that their matches were played every three days which wore out the Peruvian team, which was not used to the amount of playing. In addition to this, strife began to emerge in the Peruvian national football team between the players of Sporting Cristal and Alianza Lima.

Different people and players declared that part of the Peruvian team was pressured or bribed to lose the game by a large sum. Others, based on recent investigations, suggest that there was an agreement between the two governments within the framework of Operation Condor. Years later Videla would deny any type of arrangement, stating: "I didn't take a peso out of my pocket. There was no talk of a possible arrangement before the game, neither in the Government, nor in the Junta."

In the book How They Stole the Game, British historian David Yallop maintained that Videla ordered Rear Admiral Carlos Alberto Lacoste, in charge of the World Cup Organizing Committee, to take charge of arranging the result with the ruling dictatorship in Peru, led by General Morales Bermúdez, who decades later was sentenced to life imprisonment by the Corte d'Assise in Italy for his participation in Operation Condor. According to Yallop, Lacoste made contact with three officials who accompanied the Peruvian team and offered them a bribe of $50 million and a donation of 35,000 tons of grains. After the World Cup, Argentine Treasury Secretary Juan Alemann confirmed the Argentine "donations" made to Peru and explained that they were a type of donations that were only made in cases of humanitarian catastrophes.

Alemann denounced in 1982 that Lacoste had been the mastermind of an attack with an explosive device at his home, when on June 21, 1978, at the precise moment in which Argentina scored the fourth goal against Peru that would see it qualify to the final, a bomb exploded in Alemann and Lacoste's houses for overpricing in the organisation of the tournament. Alemann blamed Massera himself for the attack:

They planted a bomb in my house, just at the time of Argentina's fourth goal against Peru. At the bottom of this operation it was admitted that it was designed to score four goals, which was what Argentina needed to qualify. If they hadn't scored four goals, he would have gone home with the bomb... And this is a bit of this strange personality of Massera, who believed himself to be omnipotent, planted bombs, ordered people assassinated, but beyond all that was the anti-subversive fight.

On December 12, 2007, Argentine journalist Ezequiel Fernández Moores interviewed Fernando Rodríguez Mondragón, capo of the Cali Cartel led by his uncle Miguel Rodríguez Orejuela, who gave a detailed account of the way in which the bribery would have been carried out. He recounted what his uncle revealed to him, as he served as a mediator with Peruvian officials at the request of the Argentine military. According to Rodríguez Mondragón, the Argentine and player representative Carlos Quieto told Rodríguez Orejuela that the Argentine military and the Argentine Football Association (AFA) wanted to meet in reserve with the authorities of the Peruvian Football Federation (FPF), with which the Colombian drug lord maintained close relations. The meeting would have been held in Miraflores, Lima the next day, two days before the game and the captain of the ship Lacoste and two other people participated on behalf of Argentina with the president and treasurer of the FPF representing Peru. According to Rodríguez Mondragón, there it was agreed to pay the bribes to the Peruvian players and leaders and the donation of wheat which had already been requested.

Several players of the Peruvian team maintained that, in their opinion, suspicious irregularities or bribery had taken place. In 1986, Juan Carlos Oblitas declared to the press that he felt "ashamed", stating that he thought that "this match was not normal". In 2003, Oblitas announced that the dictator Videla and Kissinger had been present in the Peruvian locker room, a few minutes before the start of the game. In 2018, two starting players of the 1978 Peruvian team, José Velásquez and Germán Leguía had also declared that Videla and Kissinger entered the Peruvian locker room and read a message from Morales Bermúdez to the players. Both former players declared that the visit was interpreted by the Peruvian team as a threat. Velásquez also said that although he lacked evidence, he knew several Peruvian managers and six players who participated to fix the match, naming Rodulfo Manzo, Raúl Gorriti, Juan José Muñante and goalkeeper Ramón Quiroga, the latter being born Argentine. In an investigation carried out by Fernández Moores for Radio Continental, journalist Carlos Juvenal said that the captain of the Peruvian squad, Héctor Chumpitaz confessed to him about "additional money" but added that he would never admit it publicly.

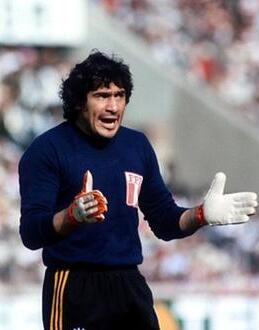
Ramón Quiroga, goalkeeper for Peru, was accused by his teammate José Velásquez of receiving bribes. Quiroga responded to Velásquez's claims by stating he had a "lack of sanity" for his accusations

The accused players have denied the claims, pointing out that they lacked evidence. Quiroga accused Velásquez of having a "lack of sanity" and responded with "I did not sell myself. If I'd taken money to go back, I could not walk through Lima today, and I do without any problems." He also added that:

That day everything worked out for Argentina and nothing for us. For example, there is a goal by Tarantini in which Manzo bends over and leaves him alone. I also think there were two goals from Argentina that were offside, one from Luque and the other, I think, from Tarantini, and the referee, Frenchman Robert Wurtz, looked the other way. Then I played in another World Cup [in 1982] and the Peruvian fans always treated me with respect. If I'd wanted to lose, as I said, I would not have been able to live another day in this country. But I've lived here for over 40 years.

Despite this, on another occasion Quiroga has pointed out that on that day, some of his teammates had acted "strange" in the game, such as Manzo who, as noted, ducked in the fourth Argentine goal, for which Quiroga adds that: "'Negro' Manzo didn't stop anything, neither he nor the defense. In Argentina's fourth goal, Manzo ducked and left the shooter alone." In addition, the unusual line-up of Peruvian coach Marcos Calderón left several notable and experienced players out of the match. In his response, Muñante stated that Velásquez was "delusional" and that Calderón didn't accept any bribes. Muñante also recounted that they didn't ask the Peruvian technical director not to line up goalkeeper Quiroga, an Argentine nationalised Peruvian, and clarified that there was a meeting in which Quiroga was asked if he wanted to save with his agreement. Muñante asserted that no player missed out since Peru was able to score two or three goals against Argentina in the first 15 minutes. Manzo maintained that neither he nor his teammates had received money for the result of the match and even though there have been speculations, there has never been any real proof of any fraud. Katia Gorriti, Raúl Gorriti's daughter, stated that Velásquez's opinions were disrespectful and unfair as they stained her father's name, also indicating that she would take legal action.

Other leading players in the match denied any bribery or match fixing and argued that there was no evidence to support the allegations. Chumpitaz declared that his team was never sold. Jaime Duarte stated that "for 29 years they have been coming up with new stories and that there is no evidence to prove such bribes." César Cueto declared that this match was legitimate, and that the defeat was due to poor physical preparation and fatigue after eleven days of competition, describing the accusations as "inventions from the press". Teófilo Cubillas declared that there was no arrangement and denied the rumours. He also stated that if they had played three times in those months, Argentina would have thrashed them again since shortly before Ecuador had also scored six goals against them and that Argentina itself had easily beaten them in another friendly. According to Cubillas, Peru "was going down" after losing to Brazil and Poland and that although they had won their group in the first phase of the Cup, the team was not doing well, unlike the Argentine team, which he described as "a waterspout that came upon us". Finally, Cubillas considered it absurd to think that Argentina sent tons of wheat to Peru, repaying the fact. He further added to his previous comments, stating that:

That day, Argentina did everything possible to win the match. In the same World Cup, Mexico also lost 6–0 against Germany, so I don't understand why people keep saying it was a fix (...) Every game I played I did it 100 percent. There was nothing that people keep talking about.

Reactions from the Argentine players have been more aware of Videla's dictatorship with Leopoldo Luque stating: "With what I know now, I can't say I am proud of my victory... but I didn't realize, most of us didn't. We just played football." Similarly, Ricardo Villa commented: "There is no doubt we were used politically."

In 2020, Dutch player Johnny Rep and Brazilian player Roberto Dinamite stated that the match had probably been arranged to "reassure the population".

Former Peruvian senator Genaro Ledesma Izquieta denounced that the party's supposed arrangement was carried out during the Peruvian dictatorship under the condition that Videla would release 13 Peruvian political prisoners; this operation would have been part of Operation Condor. In an article published in 2018, Peruvian journalist Valentín Ahón stated that he didn't believe that there were bribes or a pact between the dictatorships of Argentina and Peru.

== In popular culture ==
The match is mentioned in the song "La argentinidad al palo" by Argentine rock band Bersuit Vergarabat in the eponymous album, mentioning "the 6 to 0 at Peru" among Argentina's several "achievements" in the form of a critical parody.

== See also ==
- Argentina at the FIFA World Cup
- Peru at the FIFA World Cup
