= 1978 FIFA World Cup Group B =

Football tournament group stage

Group B of the 1978 FIFA World Cup was one of two groups of nations competing for the de facto semi-finals of the 1978 FIFA World Cup. The group's first round of matches began on 14 June and its last matches were played on 21 June. All six group matches were played either at the Estadio Ciudad de Mendoza in Mendoza, or the Estadio Gigante de Arroyito in Rosario. The group consisted of Argentina, Brazil, Peru and Poland. Argentina advanced to the final match, and Brazil advanced to the match for third place.

== Qualified teams ==
The winners of Group 2 and 4 and the runners-up of Group 1 and 3 qualified for Group B of the second round.

Group	Winners
2	Poland
4	Peru
Group	Runners-up
1	Argentina
3	Brazil

== Standings ==
Pos	Team	Pld	W	D	L	GF	GA	GD	Pts	Qualification
1	Argentina	3	2	1	0	8	0	+8	5	Advance to final
2	Brazil	3	2	1	0	6	1	+5	5	Advance to match for third place
3	Poland	3	1	0	2	2	5	−3	2	
4	Peru	3	0	0	3	0	10	−10	0	

Source: FIFA

== Matches ==
=== Brazil vs Peru ===
14 June 1978
16:45 ART

Brazil	3–0	Peru
Dirceu 15', 27'; Zico 72' (pen.)

Estadio Ciudad de Mendoza, Mendoza
Attendance: 31,278
Referee: Nicolae Rainea (Romania)

Brazil	Peru

GK	1	Émerson Leão (c)
DF	2	Toninho		(substituted off) 76'
DF	3	Oscar
DF	4	Amaral
DF	16	Rodrigues Neto
MF	17	Batista
MF	5	Toninho Cerezo
MF	11	Dirceu
FW	18	Gil		(substituted off) 70'
FW	19	Jorge Mendonça
FW	20	Roberto Dinamite	(yellow card) 80'
Substitutions:
MF	8	Zico	(substituted on) 70'
MF	21	Chicão	(substituted on) 76'
Manager:
Cláudio Coutinho

GK	21	Ramón Quiroga
DF	4	Héctor Chumpitaz (c)
DF	3	Rodulfo Manzo
DF	2	Jaime Duarte
DF	5	Rubén Díaz		(substituted off) 11'
MF	6	José Velásquez	(yellow card) 75'
MF	8	César Cueto
MF	10	Teófilo Cubillas
FW	7	Juan José Muñante
FW	11	Juan Carlos Oblitas		(substituted off) 46'
FW	19	Guillermo La Rosa
Substitutions:
DF	14	José Navarro	(substituted on) 11'
FW	9	Percy Rojas	(substituted on) 46'
Manager:
Marcos Calderón

=== Argentina vs Poland ===
14 June 1978
19:15 ART

Argentina	2–0	Poland
Kempes 16', 71'

Estadio Gigante de Arroyito, Rosario
Attendance: 37,091
Referee: Ulf Eriksson (Sweden)

Argentina	Poland

GK	5	Ubaldo Fillol
DF	19	Daniel Passarella (c)
DF	7	Luis Galván
DF	20	Alberto Tarantini
DF	15	Jorge Olguín
MF	6	Américo Gallego	(yellow card) 43'
MF	2	Osvaldo Ardiles
MF	21	José Daniel Valencia		(substituted off) 46'
FW	9	René Houseman		(substituted off) 83'
FW	10	Mario Kempes
FW	4	Daniel Bertoni
Substitutions:
MF	22	Ricardo Villa		(substituted on) 46'
FW	16	Oscar Ortiz		(substituted on) 83'
Manager:
César Luis Menotti

GK	1	Jan Tomaszewski
DF	8	Henryk Kasperczak
DF	9	Władysław Żmuda
DF	3	Henryk Maculewicz	(yellow card) 42'
DF	4	Antoni Szymanowski
MF	5	Adam Nawałka
MF	11	Bohdan Masztaler		(substituted off) 64'
MF	12	Kazimierz Deyna (c)
MF	18	Zbigniew Boniek
FW	16	Grzegorz Lato
FW	17	Andrzej Szarmach
Substitutions:
FW	2	Włodzimierz Mazur		(substituted on) 64'
Manager:
Jacek Gmoch

=== Peru vs Poland ===
18 June 1978
13:45 ART

Peru	0–1	Poland
		Szarmach 65'

Estadio Ciudad de Mendoza, Mendoza
Attendance: 35,288
Referee: Pat Partridge (England)

Peru	Poland

GK	21	Ramón Quiroga	(yellow card) 89'
DF	4	Héctor Chumpitaz (c)
DF	3	Rodulfo Manzo	(yellow card) 7'
DF	2	Jaime Duarte
DF	14	José Navarro
MF	8	César Cueto
MF	10	Teófilo Cubillas
MF	17	Alfredo Quesada
FW	7	Juan José Muñante		(substituted off) 46'
FW	11	Juan Carlos Oblitas
FW	19	Guillermo La Rosa		(substituted off) 74'
Substitutions:
MF	9	Percy Rojas		(substituted on) 46'
FW	20	Hugo Sotil		(substituted on) 74'
Manager:
Marcos Calderón

GK	21	Zygmunt Kukla
DF	3	Henryk Maculewicz
DF	4	Antoni Szymanowski
DF	6	Jerzy Gorgoń	(yellow card) 59'
DF	9	Władysław Żmuda
MF	5	Adam Nawałka
MF	11	Bohdan Masztaler		(substituted off) 46'
MF	12	Kazimierz Deyna (c)
MF	18	Zbigniew Boniek	(yellow card) 75'	(substituted off) 86'
FW	16	Grzegorz Lato
FW	17	Andrzej Szarmach
Substitutions:
DF	8	Henryk Kasperczak		(substituted on) 46'
FW	19	Włodzimierz Lubański		(substituted on) 86'
Manager:
Jacek Gmoch

=== Argentina vs Brazil ===
18 June 1978
19:15 ART

Argentina	0–0	Brazil

Estadio Gigante de Arroyito, Rosario
Attendance: 37,326
Referee: Károly Palotai (Hungary)

Argentina	Brazil

GK	5	Ubaldo Fillol
DF	19	Daniel Passarella (c)
DF	7	Luis Galván
DF	20	Alberto Tarantini
DF	15	Jorge Olguín
MF	6	Américo Gallego
MF	2	Osvaldo Ardiles		(substituted off) 46'
MF	10	Mario Kempes
FW	4	Daniel Bertoni
FW	16	Oscar Ortiz		(substituted off) 60'
FW	14	Leopoldo Luque
Substitutions:
MF	22	Ricardo Villa	(yellow card) 48'	(substituted on) 46'
FW	1	Norberto Alonso		(substituted on) 60'
Manager:
César Luis Menotti

GK	1	Émerson Leão (c)
DF	2	Toninho
DF	3	Oscar
DF	4	Amaral
DF	16	Rodrigues Neto		(substituted off) 34'
MF	17	Batista
MF	21	Chicão	(yellow card) 45'
MF	11	Dirceu
FW	18	Gil
FW	19	Jorge Mendonça		(substituted off) 67'
FW	20	Roberto Dinamite
Substitutions:
DF	6	Edinho	(yellow card) 66'	(substituted on) 34'
MF	8	Zico	(yellow card) 74'	(substituted on) 67'
Manager:
Cláudio Coutinho

=== Brazil vs Poland ===
21 June 1978
16:45 ART

Brazil	3–1	Poland
Nelinho 13'; Dinamite 58', 63'		Lato 45'

Estadio Ciudad de Mendoza, Mendoza
Attendance: 39,586
Referee: Juan Silvagno Cavanna (Chile)

Brazil	Poland

GK	1	Émerson Leão (c)
DF	13	Nelinho
DF	3	Oscar
DF	4	Amaral
DF	2	Toninho
MF	17	Batista
MF	5	Toninho Cerezo	(yellow card) 45'	(substituted off) 77'
MF	8	Zico		(substituted off) 7'
FW	11	Dirceu
FW	18	Gil
FW	20	Roberto Dinamite
Substitutions:
FW	19	Jorge Mendonça	(yellow card) 53'	(substituted on) 7'
MF	10	Rivellino	(substituted on) 77'
Manager:
Cláudio Coutinho

GK	21	Zygmunt Kukla
DF	4	Antoni Szymanowski
DF	9	Władysław Żmuda
DF	6	Jerzy Gorgoń
DF	3	Henryk Maculewicz
MF	5	Adam Nawałka
MF	8	Henryk Kasperczak		(substituted off) 64'
MF	12	Kazimierz Deyna (c)
MF	18	Zbigniew Boniek
FW	16	Grzegorz Lato
FW	17	Andrzej Szarmach
Substitutions:
FW	19	Włodzimierz Lubański	(substituted on) 64'
Manager:
Jacek Gmoch

=== Argentina vs Peru ===
21 June 1978
19:15 ART

Argentina	6–0	Peru
Kempes 21', 49'; Tarantini 43'; Luque 50', 72'; Houseman 67'

Estadio Gigante de Arroyito, Rosario
Attendance: 37,315
Referee: Robert Wurtz (France)

Argentina	Peru

GK	5	Ubaldo Fillol
RB	15	Jorge Olguín
CB	7	Luis Galván
CB	19	Daniel Passarella (c)
LB	20	Alberto Tarantini
DM	6	Américo Gallego	(substituted off) 85'
CM	12	Omar Larrosa
AM	10	Mario Kempes
RW	4	Daniel Bertoni	(substituted off) 64'
LW	16	Oscar Ortiz
CF	14	Leopoldo Luque
Substitutions:
RW	9	René Houseman	(substituted on) 64'
DM	17	Miguel Oviedo	(substituted on) 85'
Manager:
César Luis Menotti

GK	21	Ramón Quiroga
RB	2	Jaime Duarte
CB	3	Rodulfo Manzo
CB	4	Héctor Chumpitaz (c)
LB	22	Roberto Rojas
CM	17	Alfredo Quesada	(yellow card) 36'
CM	6	José Velásquez	(yellow card) 48'	(substituted off) 51'
CM	8	César Cueto
FW	7	Juan José Muñante
FW	11	Juan Carlos Oblitas
FW	10	Teófilo Cubillas
Substitutions:
FW	16	Raúl Gorriti	(substituted on) 51'
Manager:
Marcos Calderón

== See also ==
- Argentina at the FIFA World Cup
- Brazil at the FIFA World Cup
- Peru at the FIFA World Cup
- Poland at the FIFA World Cup
