= 1978 FIFA World Cup Group 4 =

Football tournament group stage

Group 4 of the 1978 FIFA World Cup began on 3 June and ended on 11 June 1978. The group consisted of Iran, Netherlands, Peru, and Scotland.

== Standings ==
Pos	Team	Pld	W	D	L	GF	GA	GD	Pts	Qualification
1	Peru	3	2	1	0	7	2	+5	5	Advance to second round
2	Netherlands	3	1	1	1	5	3	+2	3	Advance to second round
3	Scotland	3	1	1	1	5	6	−1	3	
4	Iran	3	0	1	2	2	8	−6	1	

Source: FIFA

== Matches ==
=== Peru vs Scotland ===
3 June 1978
16:45 ART

Peru	3–1	Scotland
Cueto 43'; Cubillas 71', 77'		Jordan 14'

Chateau Carreras, Córdoba
Attendance: 37,927
Referee: Ulf Eriksson (Sweden)

Peru	Scotland

GK	21	Ramón Quiroga
RB	2	Jaime Duarte
CB	3	Rodulfo Manzo
CB	4	Héctor Chumpitaz (c)
LB	5	Rubén Toribio Díaz
DM	6	José Velásquez	(yellow card) 19'
CM	8	César Cueto		(substituted off) 82'
CM	10	Teófilo Cubillas
RW	7	Juan José Muñante
LW	11	Juan Carlos Oblitas
CF	19	Guillermo La Rosa		(substituted off) 62'
Substitutes:
GK	1	Ottorino Sartor
MF	9	Percy Rojas		(substituted on) 82'
DF	14	José Navarro
MF	15	Germán Leguía
FW	20	Hugo Sotil		(substituted on) 62'
Manager:
Marcos Calderón

GK	1	Alan Rough
RB	13	Stuart Kennedy
CB	14	Tom Forsyth
CB	22	Kenny Burns
LB	4	Martin Buchan
CM	6	Bruce Rioch (c)	(substituted off) 75'
CM	7	Don Masson	(substituted off) 75'
CM	10	Asa Hartford
LW	11	Willie Johnston
SS	8	Kenny Dalglish
CF	9	Joe Jordan
Substitutes:
GK	20	Bobby Clark
DF	2	Sandy Jardine
MF	15	Archie Gemmill	(substituted on) 75'
MF	16	Lou Macari	(substituted on) 75'
FW	19	John Robertson
Manager:
Ally MacLeod

Assistant referees:
Tesfaye Gebreyesus (Ethiopia)
Angel Franco Martinez (Spain)

=== Netherlands vs Iran ===
3 June 1978
16:45 ART

Netherlands	3–0	Iran
Rensenbrink 40' (pen.), 62', 78' (pen.)

Estadio Ciudad de Mendoza, Mendoza
Attendance: 33,431
Referee: Alfonso González Archundia (Mexico)

Netherlands	Iran

GK	8	Jan Jongbloed
DF	5	Ruud Krol (c)
DF	11	Willy van de Kerkhof
DF	17	Wim Rijsbergen
DF	20	Wim Suurbier
MF	6	Wim Jansen
MF	9	Arie Haan
MF	13	Johan Neeskens
FW	10	René van de Kerkhof	(substituted off) 70'
FW	12	Rob Rensenbrink
FW	16	Johnny Rep
Substitutions:
FW	18	Dick Nanninga	(substituted on) 70'
Manager:
(Austria) Ernst Happel

GK	1	Nasser Hejazi
DF	14	Hassan Nazari
DF	15	Andranik Eskandarian	(yellow card) 78'
DF	20	Nasrollah Abdollahi
DF	21	Hossein Kazerani
MF	6	Hassan Nayebagha
MF	7	Ali Parvin (c)
MF	8	Ebrahim Ghasempour
MF	9	Mohammad Sadeghi
FW	17	Ghafour Jahani
FW	18	Hossein Faraki		(substituted off) 50'
Substitutions:
FW	10	Hassan Rowshan		(substituted on) 50'
Manager:
Heshmat Mohajerani

Assistant referees:
Robert Wurtz (France)
Miguel Comesana (Argentina)

=== Scotland vs Iran ===
7 June 1978
16:45 ART

Scotland	1–1	Iran
Eskandarian 43' (o.g.)		Danaeifard 60'

Estadio Chateau Carreras, Córdoba
Attendance: 7,938
Referee: Youssou N'Diaye (Senegal)

Scotland	Iran

GK	1	Alan Rough
DF	2	Sandy Jardine
DF	3	Willie Donachie
DF	4	Martin Buchan	(substituted off) 56'
DF	22	Kenny Burns
MF	8	Kenny Dalglish	(substituted off) 74'
MF	10	Asa Hartford
MF	15	Archie Gemmill (c)
MF	9	Joe Jordan
FW	16	Lou Macari
FW	19	John Robertson
Substitutions:
DF	14	Tom Forsyth	(substituted on) 56'
FW	21	Joe Harper	(substituted on) 74'
Manager:
Ally MacLeod

GK	1	Nasser Hejazi
DF	2	Iraj Danaeifard		(substituted off) 89'
DF	14	Hassan Nazari
DF	15	Andranik Eskandarian	(yellow card) 49'
DF	20	Nasrollah Abdollahi
DF	21	Hossein Kazerani
MF	7	Ali Parvin (c)
MF	8	Ebrahim Ghasempour
MF	9	Mohammad Sadeghi
FW	17	Ghafour Jahani
FW	18	Hossein Faraki		(substituted off) 84'
Substitutions:
FW	10	Hassan Rowshan		(substituted on) 84'
MF	6	Hassan Nayebagha		(substituted on) 89'
Manager:
Heshmat Mohajerani

Assistant referees:
Nicolae Rainea (Romania)
Arnaldo Coelho (Brazil)

=== Netherlands vs Peru ===
7 June 1978
16:45 ART

Netherlands	0–0	Peru

Estadio Ciudad de Mendoza, Mendoza
Attendance: 28,125
Referee: Adolf Prokop (East Germany)

Netherlands	Peru

GK	8	Jan Jongbloed
DF	2	Jan Poortvliet
DF	5	Ruud Krol (c)
DF	17	Wim Rijsbergen
DF	20	Wim Suurbier
MF	6	Wim Jansen
MF	9	Arie Haan
MF	11	Willy van de Kerkhof
MF	13	Johan Neeskens		(substituted off) 68'
FW	10	René van de Kerkhof	(yellow card) 25'	(substituted off) 46'
FW	12	Rob Rensenbrink
Substitutions:
FW	16	Johnny Rep		(substituted on) 46'
FW	18	Dick Nanninga		(substituted on) 68'
Manager:
(Austria) Ernst Happel

GK	21	Ramón Quiroga
RB	2	Jaime Duarte
CB	3	Rodulfo Manzo
CB	4	Héctor Chumpitaz (c)
LB	5	Rubén Toribio Díaz
DM	6	José Velásquez
CM	8	César Cueto
CM	10	Teófilo Cubillas
RW	7	Juan José Muñante	(yellow card) 65'
LW	11	Juan Carlos Oblitas
CF	19	Guillermo La Rosa		(substituted off) 62'
Substitutions:
CF	20	Hugo Sotil		(substituted on) 62'
Manager:
Marcos Calderón

Assistant referees:
Norberto Coerezza (Argentina)
Anatoly Ivanov (Soviet Union)

=== Peru vs Iran ===
11 June 1978
16:45 ART

Peru	4–1	Iran
Velásquez 2'; Cubillas 36' (pen.), 39' (pen.), 79'		Rowshan 41'

Estadio Chateau Carreras, Córdoba
Attendance: 21,262
Referee: Alojzy Jarguz (Poland)

Peru	Iran

GK	21	Ramón Quiroga
RB	2	Jaime Duarte
CB	3	Rodulfo Manzo	(substituted off) 67'
CB	4	Héctor Chumpitaz (c)
LB	5	Rubén Toribio Díaz
DM	6	José Velásquez
CM	8	César Cueto
CM	10	Teófilo Cubillas
RW	7	Juan José Muñante
LW	11	Juan Carlos Oblitas
CF	19	Guillermo La Rosa	(substituted off) 60'
Substitutions:
CF	20	Hugo Sotil	(substituted on) 60'
MF	15	Germán Leguía	(substituted on) 67'
Manager:
Marcos Calderón

GK	1	Nasser Hejazi
DF	2	Iraj Danaeifard
DF	5	Javad Allahverdi
DF	14	Hassan Nazari	(yellow card) 60'
DF	20	Nasrollah Abdollahi
DF	21	Hossein Kazerani
MF	7	Ali Parvin (c)
MF	8	Ebrahim Ghasempour
MF	9	Mohammad Sadeghi
FW	10	Hassan Rowshan		(substituted off) 66'
FW	18	Hossein Faraki		(substituted off) 51'
Substitutions:
FW	17	Ghafour Jahani		(substituted on) 51'
FW	3	Behtash Fariba		(substituted on) 66'
Manager:
Heshmat Mohajerani

Assistant referees:
Dušan Maksimović (Yugoslavia)
Werner Winsemann (Canada)

=== Scotland vs Netherlands ===
11 June 1978
16:45 ART

Scotland	3–2	Netherlands
Dalglish 45'; A. Gemmill 46' (pen.), 68'		Rensenbrink 34' (pen.); Rep 71'

Estadio Ciudad de Mendoza, Mendoza
Attendance: 35,130
Referee: Erich Linemayr (Austria)

Scotland	Netherlands

GK	1	Alan Rough
DF	3	Willie Donachie
DF	4	Martin Buchan
DF	13	Stuart Kennedy
DF	14	Tom Forsyth
MF	6	Bruce Rioch (c)
MF	8	Kenny Dalglish
MF	10	Asa Hartford
MF	15	Archie Gemmill	(yellow card) 35'
MF	18	Graeme Souness
FW	9	Joe Jordan
Manager:
Ally MacLeod

GK	8	Jan Jongbloed
DF	2	Jan Poortvliet
DF	5	Ruud Krol (c)
DF	17	Wim Rijsbergen	(substituted off) 45'
DF	20	Wim Suurbier
MF	6	Wim Jansen
MF	11	Willy van de Kerkhof
MF	13	Johan Neeskens	(substituted off) 10'
FW	10	René van de Kerkhof
FW	12	Rob Rensenbrink
FW	16	Johnny Rep
Substitutions:
MF	14	Johan Boskamp	(substituted on) 10'
DF	7	Piet Wildschut	(substituted on) 45'
Manager:
(Austria) Ernst Happel

Assistant referees:
Károly Palotai (Hungary)
Hedi Seoudi (Tunisia)

== See also ==
- Iran at the FIFA World Cup
- Netherlands at the FIFA World Cup
- Peru at the FIFA World Cup
- Scotland at the FIFA World Cup
