= Hossein Kazerani =

Iranian footballer

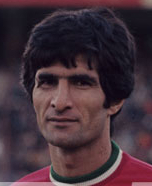

Personal information
- Date of birth: April 13, 1947 (age 79)
- Place of birth: Andimeshk, Iran
- Position: Defender

Senior career*
Years	Team	Apps	(Gls)
–1972	Afsar Sharbani	?	(?)
1972–1979	Pas Tehran	?	(?)

International career
1973–1978	Iran	25	(2)
- * Club domestic league appearances and goals

Hossein Kazerani (born April 13, 1947 in Andimeshk, Iran) is a retired Iranian football player.

He played most of his career for Pas Tehran. He was the captain and one of the key players of Pas winning the Iranian Takht Jamshid in 1977 and 1978.

He played for the Iran national football team and was a participant at the 1978 FIFA World Cup.

Kazerani ended his career in winter 1978/79, when the Iranian league was stopped due to the Iranian Revolution.
