= Rodrigues Neto =

Brazilian footballer and manager (1949–2019)

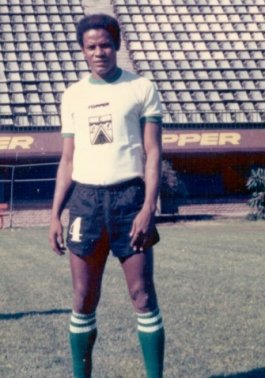

Personal information
- Full name: José Rodrigues Neto
- Date of birth: 6 December 1949
- Place of birth: Galiléia, Minas Gerais, Brazil
- Date of death: 29 April 2019 (aged 69)
- Place of death: Rio de Janeiro, Brazil

Senior career*
| Years | Team | Apps | (Gls) |
| 1965–1966 | Vitória-ES | 0 | (0) |
| 1967–1975 | Flamengo | 97 | (5) |
| 1976 | Fluminense | 17 | (1) |
| 1977–1978 | Botafogo | 22 | (0) |
| 1978–1981 | Ferro Carril Oeste | 62 | (2) |
| 1981–1982 | Internacional | 23 | (1) |
| 1982–1983 | Boca Juniors | 11 | (0) |
| 1983 | São Cristóvão | 0 | (0) |
| 1983–1984 | Eastern | 13 | (3) |
| Total | | 245 | (12) |

International career
| 1972–1978 | Brazil | 11 | (0) |

Managerial career
- 2002: Moto Club
- 2003: São Bento
- * Club domestic league appearances and goals

José Rodrigues Neto (6 December 1949 – 29 April 2019) was a Brazilian football fullback and manager.

During his career (1965–1984), he played for the following Brazilian clubs: Vitória, Flamengo, Fluminense, Botafogo, Internacional, and São Cristóvão. He also played in Argentina with Ferro Carril Oeste and Boca Juniors, and finished his career in Hong Kong with Eastern.

He won four Rio de Janeiro State League titles (1967, 1972, 1974, and 1976), two Rio Grande do Sul State League titles (1981 and 1982), and one Guanabara Cup (1970).

He earned 11 caps for the Brazil national football team from July 1972 to June 1978 and played four matches in the 1978 FIFA World Cup. He did not score any goals for Brazil. Rodrigues Neto was known for his ability to use both legs, allowing him to overcome opponents by kicking with either his right or left foot.
