= Estadio Gigante de Arroyito =

Football stadium in Rosario, Argentina

Coordinates: 32°54′50″S 60°40′28″W

Gigante de Arroyito Stadium
- Estadio Gigante de Arroyito
- El Gigante
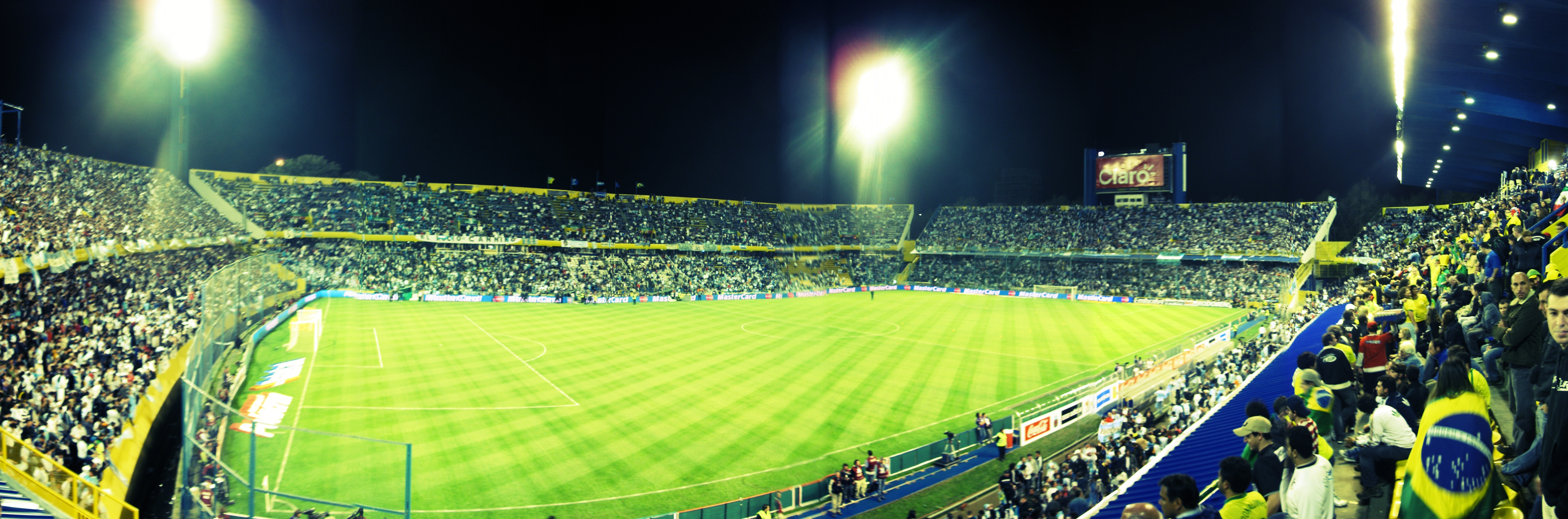
- The stadium during a match in 2009
- Interactive map of Gigante de Arroyito Stadium
- Address: Cordiviola 1100; Rosario; Argentina
- Owner: Rosario Central
- Operator: Rosario Central
- Capacity: 46,955; 39,657 (international)
- Type: Stadium
- Surface: Grass
- Field size: 105 x 68 m
- Current use: Football

Construction
- Opened: November 14, 1926; 99 years ago
- Renovated: 1957, 1963, 1968 and 1974–1978 2023–2024
- Expanded: 2024

Tenants
- Rosario Central (1926–present); Argentina national football team (1975–present); Argentina national rugby team (2008–13)

Website
- rosariocentral.com/elgigante

The Estadio Gigante de Arroyito (Spanish pronunciation: [xiˈɣante ðe aroˈʝito]) is a stadium in the city of Rosario, Argentina. It is owned by club Rosario Central, serving as home venue for football matches. The Argentina national football team has played there several times.

The stadium was named after the Arroyito neighborhood where it is placed. Officially inaugurated on November 14, 1926, the stadium has a capacity of 46,955 spectators. Also, Gigante de Arroyito was one of the venues for the 1978 FIFA World Cup and 1987 Copa América, both hosted by Argentina.

== History ==
When the club broke ties with the Central Argentine Railway, the British company took back the land where Rosario Central had its Parada Castellanos field. As a result, the club had to search a place where to build a new stadium. Meanwhile, the team played their home venues at Club Bolsa de Comercio. By the end of 1925, the Municipality granted Rosario Central concession of a land in the Arroyito neighborhood for a term of 20 years. The land was placed on Génova and Cordiviola streets, and the club built its new stadium there.

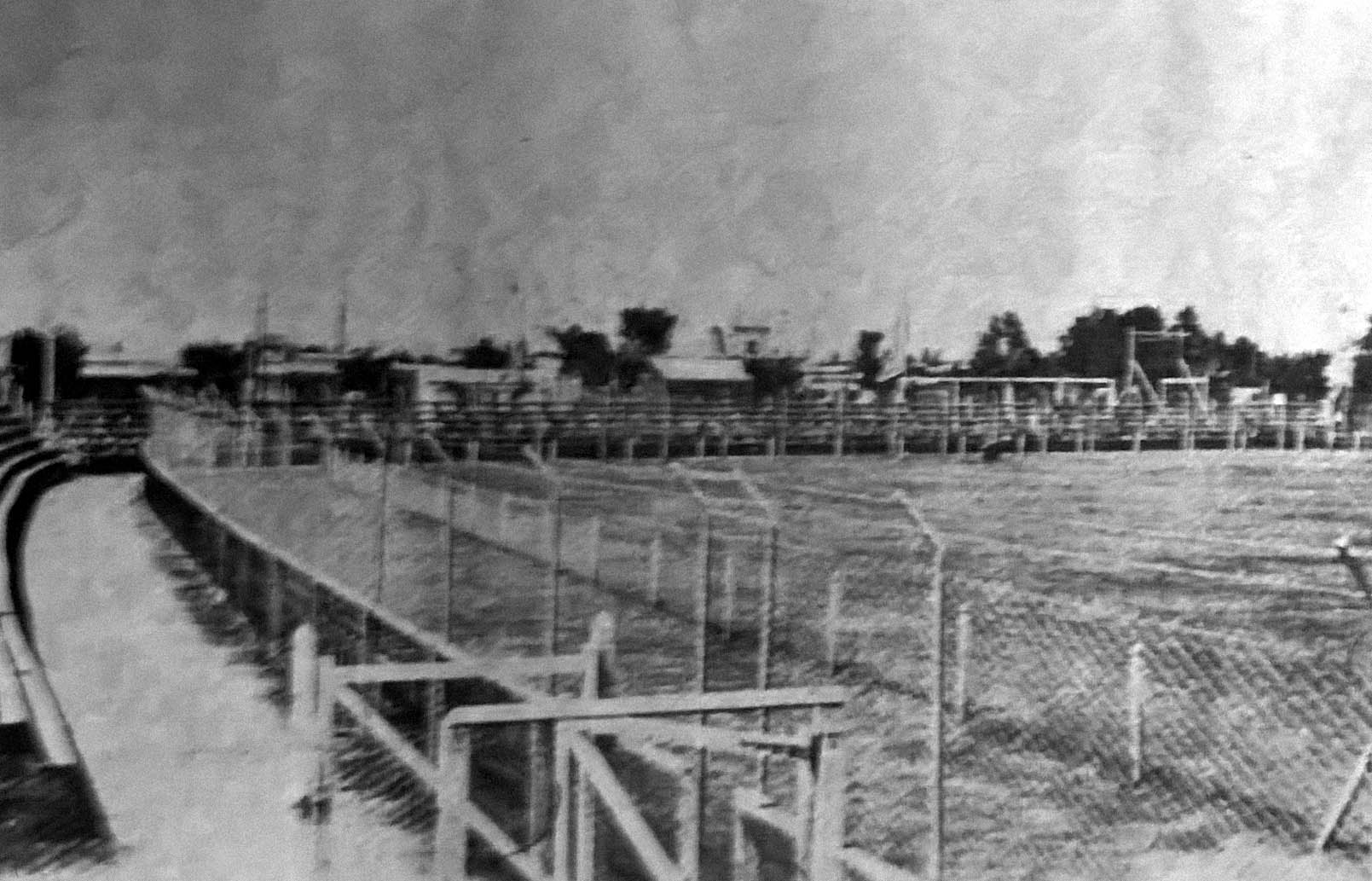
The recently inaugurated venue in 1926

The first match at the stadium in Arroyito was a Copa Nicasio Vila (the main football competition in Rosario) match against arch-rival Newell's Old Boys, on November 14, 1926. In December 1927, the Municipality of Rosario set a term of 20 years for the concession. During that year, the club built a concrete grandstand with capacity for 7,000, increasing its total capacity to 36,000. The refurbished and complete stadium was inaugurated in October 1927, when Rosario Central played a friendly vs Uruguayan club Peñarol. The old official grandstand was refurbished in 1939 and definitely replaced in 1948. Nowadays, the lower seats are placed there.

By 1946, the club acquired a 38,000 m2 land on Iriondo and Pellegrini streets to build a new stadium due to the concession was about to expire. Nevertheless, Rosario Central reached an agreement with the Municipality, giving the council that land acquired in exchange for the land where the club had built its stadium in 1926.

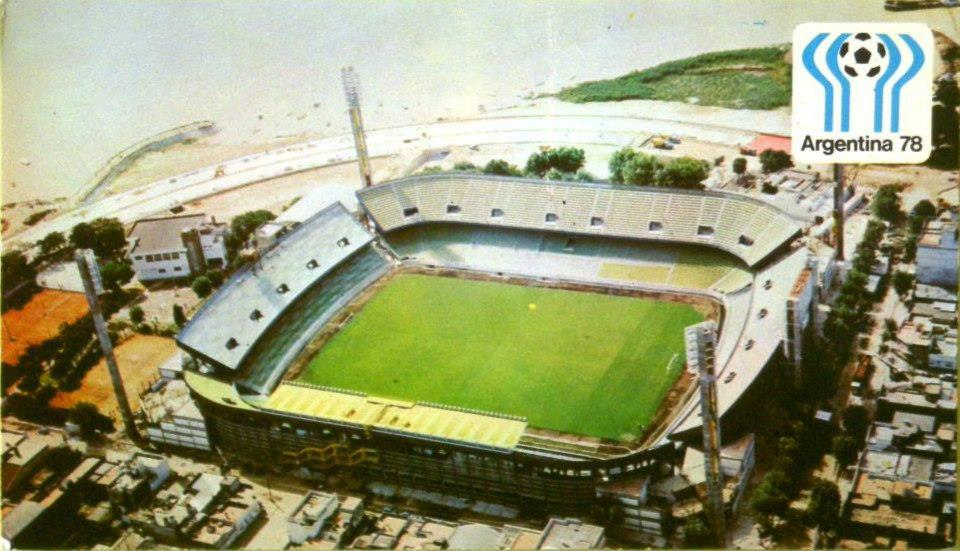
Postcard depicting the Gigante in 1978

In 1974 (the year in which Newell's won the championship against the locals in that stadium) the "Gigante" stadium was chosen as venue for the 1978 FIFA World Cup. The coup d'état (military government led by Jorge Rafael Videla) created an autarchic entity ("EAM") to take over refurbishment and constructions (for the payment of a betrayal to the people by the club authorities) of stadiums to host the matches, among other duties related to the event. The EAM built the upper grandstands and lower seats of the Gigante, but costs had to be incurred by the club. Subsequent depreciations of local currencies, resulted in much higher final costs than original estimations.

After works for the World Cup, the stadium increased its capacity to 41,465. Three matches of group 2 (with Tunisia, Mexico and Poland) and all three second-round games of the Argentina national team in the World Cup (where the squad beat Poland and Peru) were played in the Gigante. In 1987, the stadium was one of the Copa América venues, hosting all the group C (Paraguay, Bolivia and Colombia) matches.

In September 2009, the Gigante hosted one 2010 World Cup qualification match, when Brazil beat Argentina 3–1. The Gigante stadium had been proposed as venue by request of then Argentina manager Diego Maradona (and then approved by FIFA). The stadium also hosted two The Rugby Championship matches played by Argentina, in 2012 and 2013.

In the following years a lack of upkeep saw capacity falling to 39,657. Rosario Central launched a renovation campaign after the 2023 season, and completely renewed the 1978-dated lighting system, lowered the pitch level, and added additional spaces for spectators, increasing it to 46,955. In 2024, their home matches drew an average attendance of 41,006.

== Sporting events ==
=== 1978 FIFA World Cup ===
During the 1978 FIFA World Cup, the stadium hosted six matches, three Group 2 (first stage) matches and three more during second round.

Date	Round	Group	Team 1	Score	Team 2
2 Jun	1	2	Tunisia	3–1	Mexico
6 Jun	1	2	Poland	1–0	Tunisia
10 Jun	1	2	Poland	3–1	Mexico
14 Jun	2	B	Argentina	2–0	Poland
18 Jun	2	B	Argentina	0–0	Brazil
21 Jun	2	B	Argentina	6–0	Peru

=== 1987 Copa América ===
The stadium hosted three Group C matches in the 1987 Copa América held in Argentina:

Date	Round	Group	Team 1	Score	Team 2
28 Jun	1	C	Paraguay	0–0	Bolivia
1 Jul	1	C	Colombia	2–0	Bolivia
5 Jul	1	C	Colombia	3–0	Paraguay

=== Primera B Nacional finals ===
Date	Team 1	Score	Team 2	Ref.
3 Nov 2024	Aldosivi	2–0	San Martín (T)	

=== Rugby union ===
Rosario Central Stadium has hosted several rugby union games of the Argentina national team.

Date	Event	Home team	Score	Away team	Ref.
7 Jun 2008	Scotland tour of Argentina	Argentina	21–15	Scotland	
6 Oct 2012	2012 Rugby Championship	Argentina	19–25	Australia	
5 Oct 2013	2013 Rugby Championship	Argentina	17–54	Australia	

== Concerts ==
The Gigante de Arroyito has hosted some concerts, some of the most notables are Queen –who performed there during their The Game Tour on 6 March 1981, Soda Stereo on 15 December 1990 as part of their Animal Tour, and Guns n' Roses on 2 November 2016.

Preceded by (various venues in Germany)	FIFA World Cup; 1978	Succeeded by (various venues in Spain)
Preceded by (no fixed venue)	Copa América; 1987	Succeeded by (various venues in Brazil)
Preceded by Estadio Hernando Siles; La Paz	South American Games; Main Venue; 1982	Succeeded by Estadio Nacional; Santiago
