= Juan Alemann =

Argentine doctor and politician (1927–2024)

Secretary of the Treasury
- In office 30 March 1976 – 27 March 1981
- President: Jorge Rafael Videla (de facto)

Personal details
- Born: Juan Ernesto Alemann; 2 December 1927 Buenos Aires, Argentina
- Died: 3 January 2024 (aged 96)
- Occupation: Doctor

Juan Ernesto Alemann (2 December 1927 – 3 January 2024) was an Argentine doctor and politician. He served as Secretary of the Treasury from 1976 to 1981.

Alemann died on 3 January 2024, at the age of 96.
