= José Navarro (footballer, born 1948) =

Peruvian footballer (1948–2026)

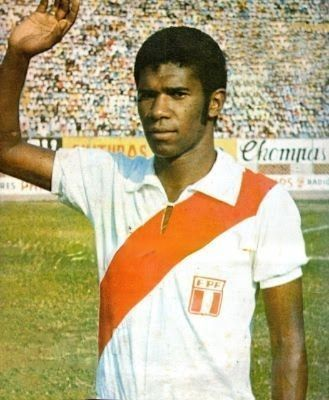
- Navarro in 1973

Personal information
- Full name: José Mercedes Navarro Aramburu
- Date of birth: 24 September 1948
- Place of birth: Lima, Peru
- Date of death: 6 May 2026 (aged 77)
- Position: Defender

Senior career*
Years	Team	Apps	(Gls)
1969–1971	Defensor Arica		
1973	Deportivo Municipal		
1974	Defensor Lima		
1975–1981	Sporting Cristal		
1982	Juan Aurich		

International career
1972–1979	Peru	30	(0)
- * Club domestic league appearances and goals

José Mercedes Navarro Aramburu (24 September 1948 – 6 May 2026) was a Peruvian football defender who played for Peru in the 1978 FIFA World Cup.

== Career ==
Navarro earned 30 caps for Peru between 1972 and 1979. He also played for Sporting Cristal. He participated in the 1978 World Cup, where he reached the quarter-finals with the team, and in the 1979 Copa América, where he reached the semi-final round.

== Death ==
Navarro died on 6 May 2026, at the age of 77.
