= Raúl Gorriti =

Peruvian footballer (1956-2015)

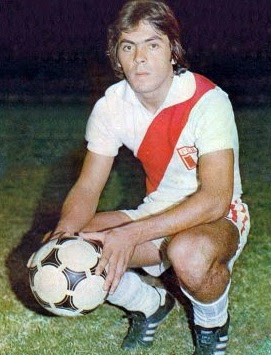
- Gorriti in 1978

Personal information
- Full name: Raúl Enrique Gorriti Drago
- Date of birth: 10 October 1956
- Place of birth: Camaná, Peru
- Date of death: 2 April 2015 (aged 58)
- Place of death: Camaná, Peru
- Position: Forward

Senior career*
Years	Team	Apps	(Gls)
1975	Sporting Cristal		
1976	León de Huánuco		
1977–1978	Sporting Cristal		
1979	Deportivo Municipal		
1980–1989	Sporting Cristal		

International career
1976–1979	Peru	11	(1)

Managerial career
- 2004: Sport Rosario
- * Club domestic league appearances and goals

Raúl Enrique Gorriti Drago (10 October 1956 – 2 April 2015) was a professional football midfielder from Peru. He competed for the Peru national football team at the 1978 FIFA World Cup and obtained a total number of 11 caps for his native country, scoring one goal, in the years 1976 to 1979.

== See also ==
- 1978 FIFA World Cup squads
