= Roberto Rojas (Peruvian footballer) =

Peruvian footballer (1955–1991)

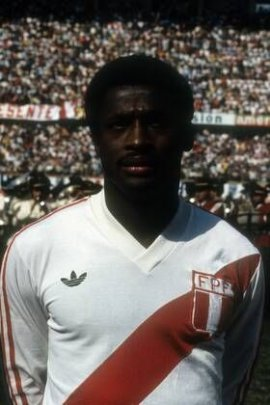
- Rojas in 1978

Personal information
- Full name: Roberto Rojas Tardío
- Date of birth: 26 October 1955
- Place of birth: Rímac, Lima, Peru
- Date of death: 27 September 1991 (aged 35)
- Place of death: Chorrillos, Lima, Peru
- Position: Defender

Senior career*
Years	Team	Apps	(Gls)
1975–1985	Alianza Lima		
1986	Sporting Cristal		
1987	Deportivo Municipal		
1987–1988	Alianza Lima		

International career
1978–1983	Peru	27	(0)
- * Club domestic league appearances and goals

Roberto Rojas Tardío (born 26 October 1955 – 27 September 1991) was a Peruvian football defender who played for Peru in the 1978 FIFA World Cup.

== Career ==
Rojas earned 27 caps for Peru between 1978 and 1983. He also played for Alianza Lima, Sporting Cristal and Deportivo Municipal. He died in a car crash in September 1991.
