= Estadio Malvinas Argentinas =

Football stadium in Mendoza, Argentina

Coordinates: 32°53′23″S 68°52′48″W

Malvinas Argentinas Stadium
- Estadio Malvinas Argentinas

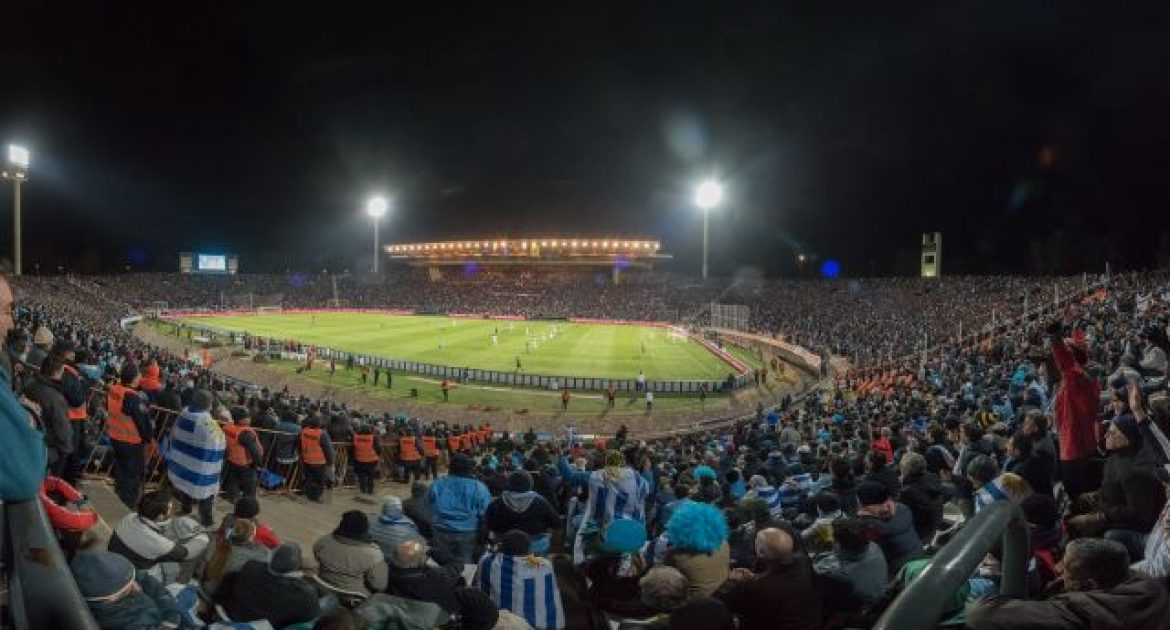
- Interactive map of Malvinas Argentinas Stadium
- Former names: Estadio Ciudad de Mendoza
- Address: Bajada del Cerro s/n Mendoza; Argentina
- Owner: Government of Mendoza
- Capacity: 42,000; 38,300 (international)
- Surface: Grass
- Field size: 105 x 70 m
- Current use: Football matches; Rugby union matches

Construction
- Built: 1976–1978
- Opened: 14 May 1978; 48 years ago
- Architect: Rafael Viñoly

Tenants
- Godoy Cruz; Independiente Rivadavia; Huracán Las Heras; San Martín de Mendoza; Argentina football team (1995–present); Argentina rugby team (2007–present)

Website
- mendoza.gov.ar/estadio

Malvinas Argentinas Stadium (Spanish: Estadio Malvinas Argentinas) is a stadium in the city of Mendoza in the homonymous province of Argentina. With a seating capacity of 42,000 spectators, the stadium is the largest in Mendoza. Built for the 1978 FIFA World Cup, it is owned and administered by the provincial government.

The venue is mostly used for association football matches, although it has hosted some rugby union games during The Rugby Championship, as well as music concerts. In Primera División matches, local club Godoy Cruz plays their home matches at Malvinas Argentinas in some occasions.

== History ==
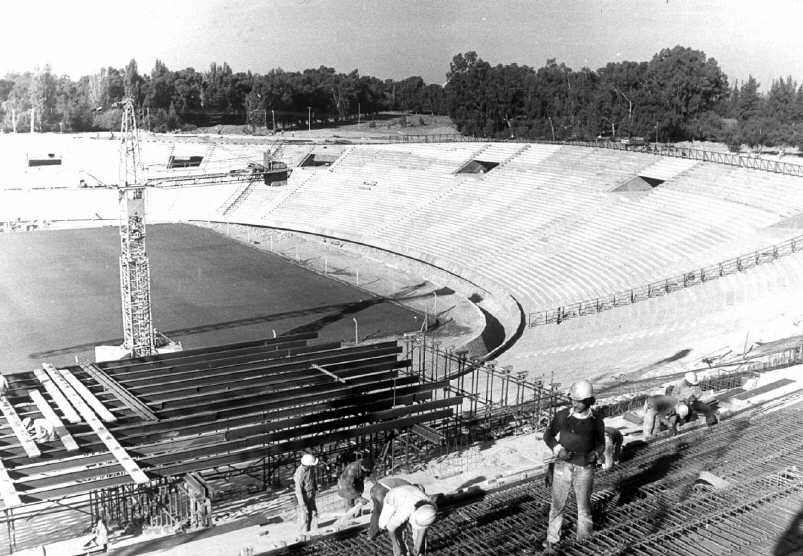
The stadium under construction in 1977

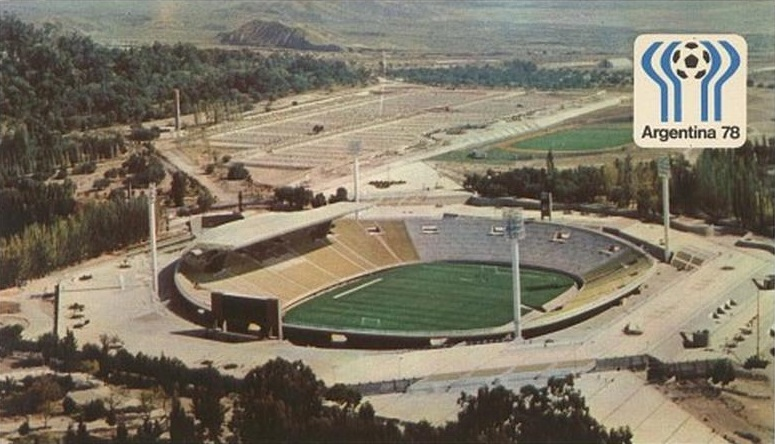
Promotional image of the stadium with the logo of the 1978 World Cup

Argentina was chosen as the host nation of the 1978 World Cup by FIFA in London, England on 6 July 1966. Mendoza, as one of the largest cities in the country, was selected as a venue. Supervised by the National Reorganization Process, which had ruled Argentina since 1976, the organizing committee proposed that a new stadium be built in a depression adjacent to the Cerro de la Gloria, in General San Martín Park. Besides the stadium, the project would include new access roads, parking lots, and a training field.

The stadium was designed by Uruguayan Rafael Viñoly, and it was built from 1976 to 1978. A notable feature is a dry moat surrounding the playing field and separating it from the grandstand. Originally named "Estadio Ciudad de Mendoza" (City of Mendoza Stadium in Spanish), it was opened on 14 May 1978 with a friendly match between players from Mendoza and players from San Rafael. Mendoza hosted six World Cup matches: three first round matches, and three second round matches. That same year, Gimnasia y Esgrima de Mendoza became the first team from Mendoza to play a first division match at the stadium. Other teams from Mendoza that have reached the first division and played home matches at the stadium are Independiente Rivadavia, Huracán Las Heras, San Martín de Mendoza, and Godoy Cruz Antonio Tomba.

After the Falklands War, the stadium was renamed Estadio Malvinas Argentinas (The Malvinas Are Argentinian Stadium), reflecting Argentina's position in the Falkland Islands sovereignty dispute.

Pursuant to an agreement with sports communications company Torneos y Competencias (TyC), for the 1993–94 Primera División season, Buenos Aires-area club Argentinos Juniors played home matches at the stadium in exchange for players loaned by TyC. TyC wrongly assumed that the club had more supporters in Mendoza, as attendance was low, and financial losses substantial. Midway through the season, the stadium participated in the first of many Torneos de Verano (Summer Tournaments).

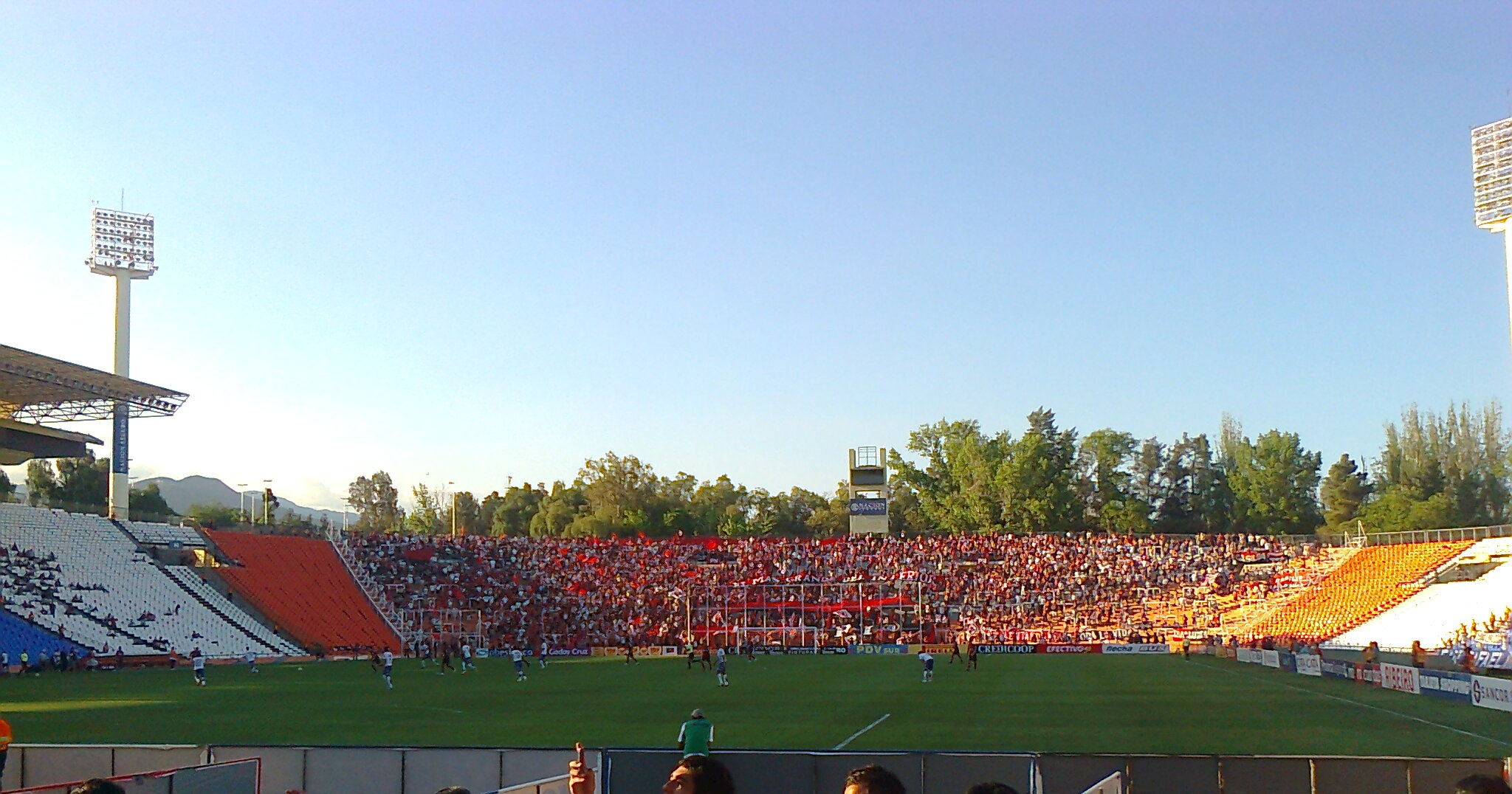
The stadium in 2012, during a match between Godoy Cruz and Newell's Old Boys

In 2011, Godoy Cruz qualified for that year's Copa Libertadores and Copa Sudamericana, meaning that for the first time, the stadium hosted matches in an international club competition. Through the club, the stadium would also host matches in the 2012 Copa Libertadores and 2014 Copa Sudamericana.

In the 2016–17 season, Godoy Cruz drew an average home league attendance of 16,000.

== Renovation ==
The stadium was renovated for the 2011 Copa América held in Argentina. Among other works during the renovation all the seats were replaced, the bathrooms were reconstructed, the roof of the stadium was repaired and a new 128 m2 LED screen was installed, being during that time the largest of its kind in South America.

== Sporting events ==
The stadium was built for the 1978 FIFA World Cup and during June 1978 Mendoza it hosted six matches, three group 4 matches and three second round matches.

=== 1978 FIFA World Cup ===
Date	Time (UTC-03)	Round	Group	Team #1	Res.	Team #2	Attendance
3 June	16:45	1	Group 4	Netherlands	3–0	Iran	33,431
7 June	16:45	1	Group 4	Netherlands	0–0	Peru	28,125
11 June	16:45	1	Group 4	Scotland	3–2	Netherlands	35,130
14 June	16:45	2	Group B	Peru	0–3	Brazil	31,278
18 June	13:45	2	Group B	Peru	0–1	Poland	35,288
21 June	16:45	2	Group B	Brazil	3–1	Poland	39,586

Apart from the 1978 FIFA World Cup, Malvinas Argentinas stadium has hosted several sporting events, being one of the venues for the 2001 FIFA World Youth Championship, the 2011 Copa América, the 2013 South American Youth Football Championship and the 2023 FIFA U-20 World Cup.

The Argentina national football team has played several friendly matches in Mendoza but only one official match: it was on 2012 against Uruguay for the 2014 FIFA World Cup qualification.

Local team Godoy Cruz used the Malvinas Argentinas as venue during their home matches in the 2011 and 2017 Copa Libertadores, and 2011 Copa Sudamericana. The stadium also hosted several Copa Argentina matches, and the 2017 Supercopa Argentina.

=== Rugby union ===
Estadio Malvinas Argentinas has hosted several rugby union games, most of them Argentina tests and some Cuyo RU team against touring sides.

On the other hand, the final and 3rd place match of the 2005 Under 21 Rugby World Championship were played at this stadium, while the rest of the tournament was held in smaller different stadiums of Mendoza province.

Date	Event	Home team	Score	Away team	Ref.
12 Jun 1985	1985 France tour	Cuyo RU	6–64	France	
17 Oct 1987	1987 Australia tour	Cuyo RU	3–40	Australia	
9 Jun 2007	2007 Italy tour	Argentina	24–6	Italy	
25 Aug 2012	2012 Rugby Championship	Argentina	16–16	South Africa	
24 Aug 2013	2013 Rugby Championship	Argentina	17–22	South Africa	
4 Oct 2014	2014 Rugby Championship	Argentina	21–17	Australia	
25 Jul 2015	2015 Rugby Championship	Argentina	9–34	Australia	
10 Jun 2017	2017 England tour	Argentina	34–38	England	
7 Oct 2017	2017 Rugby Championship	Argentina	20–37	Australia	
25 Aug 2018	2018 Rugby Championship	Argentina	32–19	South Africa	
13 Aug 2022	2022 Rugby Championship	Argentina	26–41	Australia	
6 Jul 2024	2024 France tour	Argentina	13–28	France	
5 Sep 2026	Copa VISA–Galicia	Argentina	TBD	Australia	

== Concerts ==
The stadium played host to Amnesty International's Human Rights Now! Benefit Concert on October 14, 1988. The show was headlined by Sting and Peter Gabriel and also featured Bruce Springsteen & The E Street Band, Tracy Chapman and Youssou N'Dour.

Other artists that have played at the Malvinas Argentinas are Soda Stereo (1989), Fito Páez (1989), Luis Miguel (1999), Charly García (2000), Divididos (2003), Ricky Martin (2007), Joaquín Sabina with Joan Manuel Serrat (2007), Chayanne (2007), Maná (2011), and Ricardo Arjona (2014),

The main event of the 2012 Fiesta Nacional de la Vendimia was held at this stadium.

== See also ==
- List of association football stadiums by capacity
- List of football stadiums in Argentina
- Lists of stadiums

Preceded by (various venues in Germany)	FIFA World Cup; Venue; 1978	Succeeded by (various venues in Spain)
Preceded by various venues in Nigeria	FIFA U-20 World Cup; Venue; 2001	Succeeded by various venues in United Arab Emirates
Preceded by (various venues in Venezuela)	Copa América; Venue; 2011	Succeeded by (various venues in Chile)
Preceded by various venues in Poland	FIFA U-20 World Cup; Venue; 2023	Succeeded by TBD
