= Jaime Duarte =

Peruvian football player and manager (born 1955)

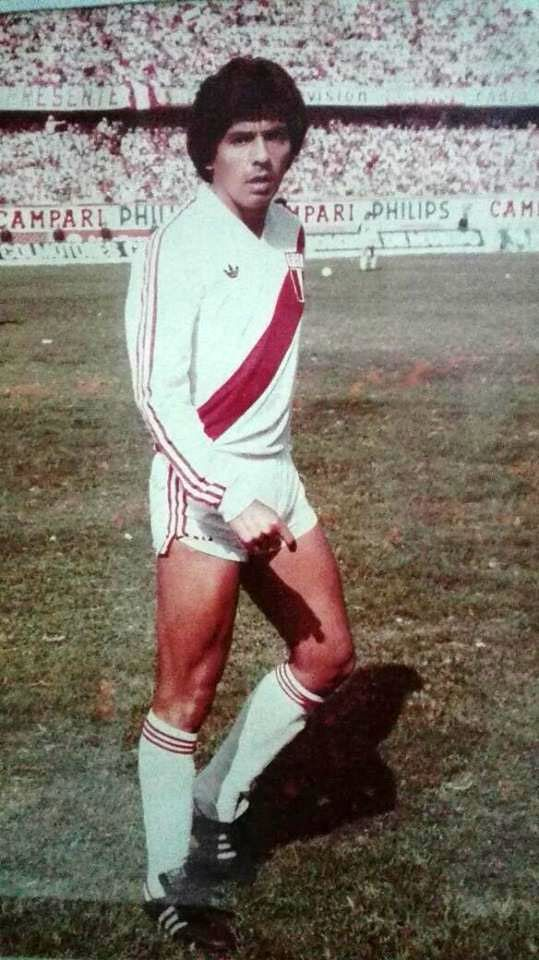
- Duarte in 1978

Personal information
- Full name: Jaime Eduardo Duarte Huerta
- Date of birth: 27 February 1955 (age 71)
- Place of birth: Lima, Peru
- Height: 1.70 m (5 ft 7 in)
- Position: Right-back

Senior career*
Years	Team	Apps	(Gls)
1973–1985	Alianza Lima		
1986–1988	San Agustín		
1988–1989	Deportivo Italia		
1989–1990	Sport Boys		

International career
1975–1985	Peru	54	(1)

Managerial career
- 2000: Peru beach soccer
- 2001: Alianza Lima
- 2010–2012: Peru women
- 2020: Alianza Lima
- * Club domestic league appearances and goals

Jaime Eduardo Duarte Huerta (born 27 February 1955) is a Peruvian football former professional player and manager. He played as a right-back.

== Club career ==
At a club level, Duarte played his football for Alianza Lima in Peru where he was a member of the team that won two consecutive Peruvian league titles in 1977 and 1978.

Duarte also played for Sport Boys, San Agustín in Peru and Deportivo Italia in Venezuela.

== International career ==
Duarte played a total of 55 games for the Peru national team between 1975 and 1985 including appearances at the World Cup in 1978 and 1982 and the Copa América in 1979 and 1983.

== Managerial career ==
Duarte managed the Peru women's national team at the 2010 South American Championship.

== Honours ==
=== Player ===
Alianza Lima

- Torneo Descentralizado (3): 1975, 1977, 1978

San Agustín

- Torneo Descentralizado: 1986

Sport Boys

- Peruvian Segunda División: 1989

Peru (amateur)

- Bolivarian Games: 1973

Individual

- World XI: 1982, 1983
