= Rodulfo Manzo =

Peruvian footballer (born 1949)

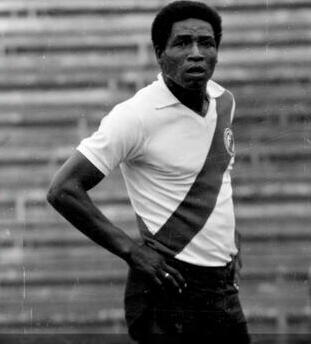
- Manzo in 1978

Personal information
- Full name: Rodulfo Nicanor Manzo Audante
- Date of birth: June 5, 1949 (age 77)
- Place of birth: San Luis de Cañete, Lima Region, Peru

International career
Years	Team	Apps	(Gls)
- Peru

Rodulfo Nicanor Manzo Audante (born June 5, 1949) is a Peruvian retired professional footballer who played as a defender. He competed for the Peru national football team at the 1978 FIFA World Cup, and obtained a total number of 22 caps for his native country in the years 1972 to 1978. He played club football for Deportivo Municipal. He is also the father of Ytalo Manzo.

== See also ==
- 1978 FIFA World Cup squads
