= 1978 FIFA World Cup =

Association football tournament in Argentina

Copa Mundial de Fútbol Argentina '78 (Spanish)

Tournament details
- Host country: Argentina
- Dates: 1–25 June
- Teams: 16 (from 5 confederations)
- Venues: 6 (in 5 host cities)

Final positions
- Champions: Argentina (1st title)
- Runners-up: Netherlands
- Third place: Brazil
- Fourth place: Italy

Tournament statistics
- Matches played: 38
- Goals scored: 102 (2.68 per match)
- Attendance: 1,545,791 (40,679 per match)
- Top scorer: (Argentina) Mario Kempes (6 goals)
- Best player: (Argentina) Mario Kempes
- Best young player: (Italy) Antonio Cabrini
- Fair play award: Argentina

The 1978 FIFA World Cup was the 11th edition of the FIFA World Cup, the quadrennial international football world championship tournament among the men's senior national teams. It was held in Argentina between 1 and 25 June.

The tournament was won by the host nation, Argentina, who defeated the Netherlands 3–1 in the final, after extra time. The final was held at River Plate's home stadium, Estadio Monumental, in the Argentine capital of Buenos Aires. This win was the first World Cup title for Argentina, who became the fifth team (after Uruguay, Italy, England, and West Germany) to be both hosts and world champions and the third South American team to win the World Cup. Argentina, the Netherlands, and Brazil were the gold, silver, and bronze medalists, respectively.

Iran and Tunisia made their first appearances in the tournament. The defending champions, West Germany, were eliminated in the second round (finishing third in their group). This was also the last World Cup tournament to use the original inclusion of 16 teams. Since the first World Cup in 1930, only 15 teams (plus the host, who automatically qualified) had been allowed to qualify (the reigning title holders also received automatic qualification from 1934 through 2002); but for the next World Cup, in Spain, FIFA expanded that tournament to 24 teams.

This tournament was marred by flagrant controversy, domestic politics, and alleged interference and match-fixing by the Argentine authoritarian military junta government that was using this tournament as an opportunity for nationalistic propaganda and for seeking legitimacy on the world stage. During the months before the start of the World Cup, the junta was intending to dismantle those who were against them and mitigate criticism from the public on their policies. The official match ball was the Adidas Tango Durlast.

== Host selection ==
Argentina was chosen as the host nation by FIFA on 6 July 1966 in London, England, when the hosts for 1974, 1978 and 1982 editions were chosen. Mexico withdrew from the bidding process after having been awarded the 1970 event two years earlier.

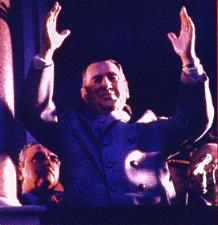
The gesture by Juan Domingo Perón which inspired the tournament logo.

The logo is based on President Juan Perón's signature gesture: a salute to the crowd with both arms extended above his head. This was one of the most famous, populist images of Perón. The design was created in 1974, two years prior to the military coup in 1976. The military leadership were aware that the World Cup's logo symbolised Perón's gesture, and they tried to change the competition's logo. At this point, the design was already broadly commercialised and the merchandise had already been made: a forced modification "would trigger a sea of lawsuits against the country", so the military had no option but to give up their attempts and leave it.

The monetary cost of preparing to host the World Cup was put at $700 million, including building three new stadia and redeveloping three others; building five press centres; a new communications system costing $100 million; and improvements to transport systems. Argentina received a lot of criticism for human rights abuses leading up to the tournament.

== Qualification ==
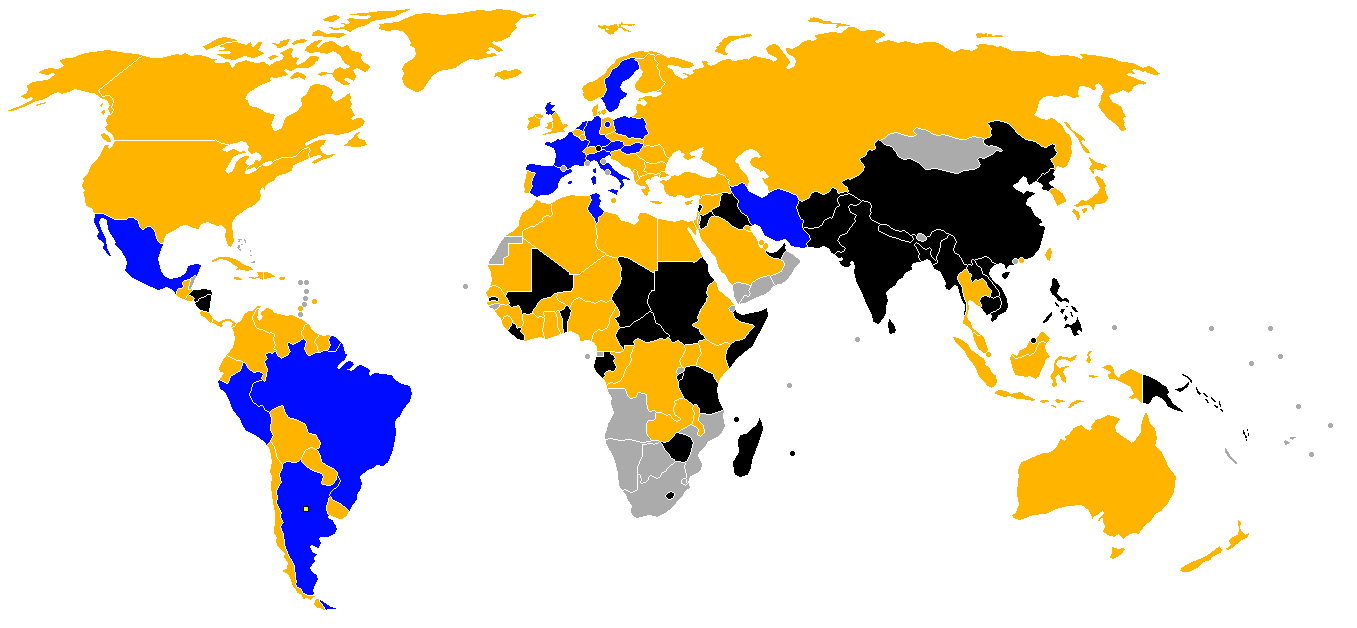
Countries that qualified for World Cup Countries that failed to qualify Countries that did not enter Non-FIFA members

Newcomers to the finals were Iran and Tunisia; Austria qualified for the first time since 1958, while France, Spain and Hungary were back for the first time since 1966. Peru and Mexico returned after missing the 1974 tournament. For the first time, more than 100 nations entered the competition.

=== List of teams qualifying ===
The following 16 teams qualified for the final tournament:

AFC (1)

- Iran (debut)

CAF (1)

- Tunisia (debut)

OFC (0)
None qualified

CONCACAF (1)

- Mexico

CONMEBOL (3)

- Argentina (hosts)
- Brazil
- Peru

UEFA (10)

- Austria
- France
- Hungary
- Italy
- Netherlands
- Poland
- Scotland
- Spain
- Sweden
- West Germany (holders)

== Format ==
The format of the competition stayed the same as in 1974: Sixteen (16) teams qualified, divided into four groups of four. Each group played a round-robin with two points for a win and one for a draw, and goal difference used to separate teams level on points. The top two teams in each group advanced to the second round, where they were split into two groups of four. The winners of each group played each other in the final, and the second-place finishers in the match for third place.

== Summary ==
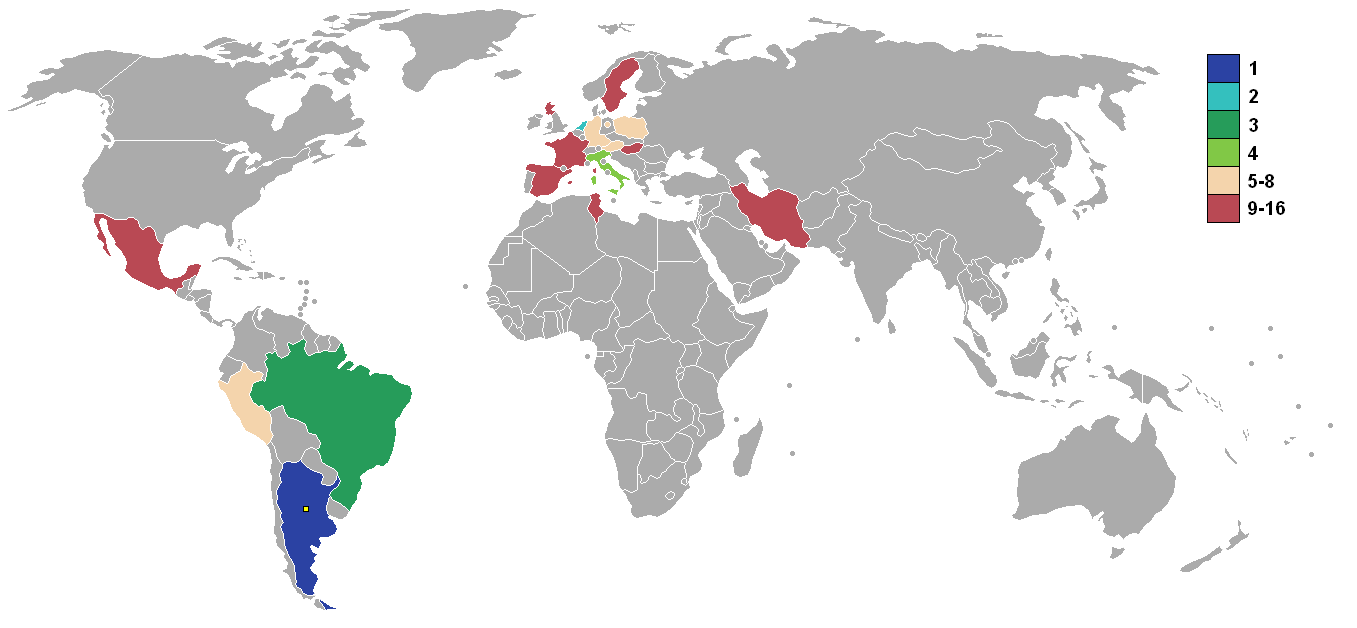
Champion Runner-up Third place Fourth place Second round First round

=== First round ===
The first round produced several surprises. Poland won Group 2 ahead of world champions West Germany, after holding the Germans to a goalless draw and then beating Tunisia and Mexico. The Germans then beat Mexico 6–0, and finally played out a second goalless draw against Tunisia. Although they failed to qualify for the second round, Tunisia made history by beating Mexico 3–1 while trailing 0–1 at half time. It was the first time that any African team had won a match at the World Cup finals.

Peru pushed the Netherlands into second place in Group 4, where Scotland missed out on goal difference for the second successive tournament. Teófilo Cubillas was outstanding for Peru, scoring twice against Scotland in Peru's 3–1 win and hitting a hat-trick in their 4–1 victory over newcomers Iran. Rob Rensenbrink of the Netherlands also scored three times against Iran, scoring all the goals as the Dutch won 3–0. Scotland drew with Iran 1–1 and the only highlight of their campaign was a 3–2 victory over the Netherlands in their final group game which was not enough to prevent elimination. Iran, the reigning Asian champions, went out of the tournament winless. Rensenbrink's goal against Scotland was the 1000th goal of World Cup history. Scotland's Willie Johnston was expelled from the World Cup after he was found to have taken a banned stimulant during the opening game against Peru.

The biggest surprise of all came in Group 3, where Austria finished ahead of Brazil. The Austrians beat Spain and Sweden, while Brazil were held to draws by the same two teams. The draw between Brazil and Sweden was especially controversial; Welsh referee Clive Thomas awarded Brazil a very late corner kick, and Zico directly headed the kick into the net; but Thomas blew for time before Zico made contact with the ball, and the goal was disallowed. The Brazilian players were not happy with the decision, but the final result remained a 1–1 draw. Heading into their final group game, Brazil needed to beat Austria to be certain of advancing to the second round and managed a 1–0 win thanks to a goal from Roberto Dinamite. Brazil and Austria thus finished with the same number of points and the same goal difference, but Austria won the group by virtue of having scored more goals.

Group 1 had the strongest line-up of teams in the first round, featuring Italy, the host Argentina, France and Hungary. The two places in the second round were claimed before the final round of games, with Italy and Argentina both beating France and Hungary. The match between Italy and Argentina decided who topped the group, and a goal from Roberto Bettega midway through the second half was enough to give that honour to Italy. It also forced Argentina to move out of Buenos Aires and play in Rosario.

The 1978 World Cup marked the fourth and last occasion during which a national team did not wear its own kit to play a match (the first being in the 1934 World Cup match for third place between Germany and Austria; the second in the 1950 World Cup first round match between Switzerland and Mexico and the third in the 1958 World Cup first round match between West Germany and Argentina). The incident happened during the game between France and Hungary. Both teams arrived at the venue with only their white change kits, resulting in a delayed kickoff while officials went in search of the jerseys of a local team from Mar del Plata, Club Atlético Kimberley; the jerseys had vertical green and white stripes and were worn by France.

=== Second round ===
In the all-European Group A, the Netherlands got off to a flying start by thrashing Austria 5–1, Johnny Rep scoring two of their goals. In a rematch of the 1974 final, the Dutch then drew 2–2 with West Germany, who had previously shared a goalless game with Italy. The Italians beat Austria 1–0, and so the Netherlands faced Italy in their last group game knowing that the winners would reach the final. Ernie Brandts scored an 18th-minute own goal to put Italy ahead at half-time, but he made up for his mistake by scoring at the right end in the fifth minute of the second half. Arie Haan got the winner for the Dutch with 15 minutes remaining, and the Netherlands had reached their second successive World Cup Final. In the game known as the miracle of Cordoba, West Germany were surprisingly beaten by Austria 2–3 which marked their end as World Champions.

Group B was essentially a battle between Argentina and Brazil, and it was resolved in controversial circumstances. In the first round of group games, Brazil beat Peru 3–0 while Argentina saw Poland off by a score of 2–0. Brazil and Argentina then played out a tense and violent goalless draw, so both teams went into the last round of matches with three points. Argentina delayed the kick-off of its last match to await the result of the Brazil-Poland encounter. Brazil won by a 3–1 score, meaning Argentina had to beat Peru by four clear goals to reach the final but they managed to do it. Trailing 2–0 at half-time, Peru simply collapsed in the second half, and Argentina eventually won 6–0. As previously noted, rumours suggested that Peru might have been bribed or threatened into allowing Argentina to win the match by such a large margin. However, nothing could be proved, and Argentina met the Netherlands in the final. Brazil took third place from an enterprising Italian side with Nelinho scoring a memorable goal, and were dubbed "moral champions" by coach Cláudio Coutinho, because they did not win the tournament, but did not lose a single match.

=== Final ===
The final, Argentina vs Netherlands, was also controversial, as the Dutch accused the Argentines of using stalling tactics to delay the match. The host team came out late and questioned the legality of a plaster cast on René van de Kerkhof's wrist, which the Dutch said allowed tension to build in front of a hostile Buenos Aires crowd. Mario Kempes opened the scoring for the hosts before Dick Nanninga equalised a few minutes from the end. Rob Rensenbrink had a glorious stoppage-time opportunity to win it for the Netherlands but his effort came back off the goal post. Argentina won the final 3–1 after extra time, after Daniel Bertoni scored and Kempes, who finished as the tournament's top scorer with six goals, added his second of the day. The Netherlands, because of the controversial game events, refused to attend the post-match ceremonies after the match ended. They had lost their second consecutive World Cup final, both times to the host nation, after losing to West Germany in 1974. Argentina won 5 games but became the first team to win the World Cup after failing to win two matches, where they had lost to Italy in the first round and drawn with Brazil in the second round. Four years later, Italy would win the next World Cup despite failing to win three games.

== Mascot ==
The official mascot of this World Cup was Gauchito, a boy wearing an Argentina kit. His hat (with the words ARGENTINA '78), neckerchief, and whip are typical of gauchos.

== Venues ==
In 1972, eight venues were preselected; six that were used for the finals, plus La Plata and Tucuman. La Plata, the city of the diagonals, promised a "one-of-a-kind stadium" but by 1974 it was scrapped by internal bids. The La Plata Stadium was finally completed in 2003. In the case of Tucuman, an ambitious stadium of 70,000 spectators had been promised in Horco Molle, similar to the current Racing Club Stadium, along with the roof. The Tucuman venue was temporarily suspended in 1974 and was decommissioned the following year, given the intensity of the actions of the guerrillas and the Armed Forces in the province. Three new stadiums were built (Olympic Stadium in Córdoba; World Cup Stadium in Mar del Plata; and Mendoza City Stadium in Mendoza) and the other three were remodelled.

Of the six venues used, the River Plate Stadium in Buenos Aires was the largest and most used venue, hosting nine total matches, including the final. The Olympic Stadium in Cordoba hosted eight matches, the stadiums in Mendoza, Rosario and Mar del Plata each hosted six matches and José Amalfitani Stadium in Buenos Aires hosted three matches — bringing the Argentine capital and largest city's total to 12 — nearly a third of all the matches played. The World Cup Stadium in Mar del Plata was heavily criticised due to its terrible pitch, which was deemed "nearly unplayable"; whereas the Amalfitani stadium in Buenos Aires, which was refurbished with the completion of press boxes and another section of upper stands but was the least used stadium for the tournament, was praised for its very good pitch. Brazil was forced by tournament organisers to play all three of its first group matches in Mar del Plata; there had been rumours and allegations of the organisers deliberately sabotaging the Minella stadium's pitch to weaken Brazil's chances of success.

Buenos Aires		Córdoba
River Plate Stadium	José Amalfitani Stadium	Olympic Stadium
Capacity: 74,624	Capacity: 49,318	Capacity: 46,986
Mar del Plata	1978 FIFA World Cup is located in Argentina	
World Cup Stadium	1978 FIFA World Cup is located in Argentina	
Capacity: 43,542	1978 FIFA World Cup is located in Argentina	
Rosario	1978 FIFA World Cup is located in Argentina	
Rosario Central Stadium	1978 FIFA World Cup is located in Argentina	
Capacity: 45,645	1978 FIFA World Cup is located in Argentina	
Mendoza	Stadiums in Buenos Aires	
Mendoza City Stadium	Stadiums in Buenos Aires	
Capacity: 34,954	Stadiums in Buenos Aires	

== Match officials ==
AFC

- (Syria) Farouk Bouzo
- (Iran) Jafar Namdar
- (Israel) Abraham Klein

CAF

- (Senegal) Youssou N'Diaye

CONCACAF

- (Mexico) Alfonso González Archundia

CONMEBOL

- (Uruguay) Ramón Barreto
- (Brazil) Arnaldo Cézar Coelho
- (Argentina) Ángel Norberto Coerezza
- (Peru) César Orosco
- (Chile) Juan Silvagno

UEFA

- (West Germany) Ferdinand Biwersi
- (Netherlands) Charles Corver
- (Switzerland) Jean Dubach
- (Sweden) Ulf Eriksson
- (Portugal) António Garrido
- (Scotland) John Gordon
- (Italy) Sergio Gonella
- (Poland) Alojzy Jarguz
- (Austria) Erich Linemayr
- (Socialist Federal Republic of Yugoslavia) Dušan Maksimović
- (Spain) Ángel Franco Martínez
- (Hungary) Károly Palotai
- (England) Pat Partridge
- (East Germany) Adolf Prokop
- (Romania) Nicolae Rainea
- (Belgium) Francis Rion
- (Wales) Clive Thomas
- (France) Robert Wurtz

== Squads ==
For a list of all squads that appeared in the final tournament, see 1978 FIFA World Cup squads.

== Seeding ==
Pot 1	Pot 2	Pot 3	Pot 4
Argentina (hosts); West Germany (defending champions); Netherlands (1974 runners-up); Brazil	Italy*; Poland; Scotland; Spain; *Italy placed in Group 1 with Argentina prior to the draw	Hungary; Mexico^; Peru^; Sweden^Mexico and Peru to be placed in either Group 2 or 4 to avoid South American seeds	Austria; France; Iran; Tunisia

== First group stage ==
=== Group 1 ===
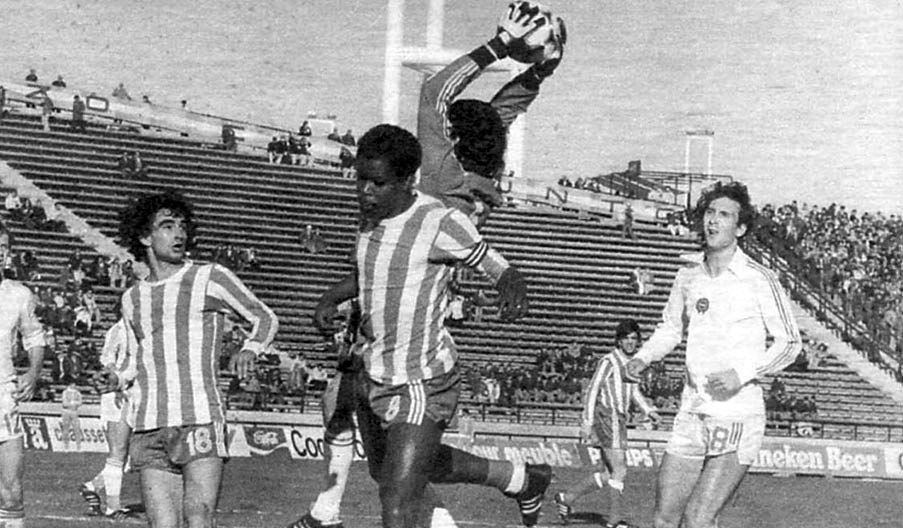
France (wearing local Club Kimberley shirt) v Hungary

Pos	Team	Pld	W	D	L	GF	GA	GD	Pts	Qualification
1	Italy	3	3	0	0	6	2	+4	6	Advance to second round
2	Argentina	3	2	0	1	4	3	+1	4	Advance to second round
3	France	3	1	0	2	5	5	0	2	
4	Hungary	3	0	0	3	3	8	−5	0	

Source: FIFA
2 June 1978
13:45 ART

Italy	2–1	France
Rossi 29'; Zaccarelli 54'		Lacombe 1'

Estadio José María Minella, Mar del Plata
Attendance: 42,373
Referee: Nicolae Rainea (Romania)
2 June 1978
19:15 ART

Argentina	2–1	Hungary
Luque 14'; Bertoni 83'		Csapó 9'

Estadio Monumental, Buenos Aires
Attendance: 71,615
Referee: Antonio Garrido (Portugal)

6 June 1978
13:45 ART

Italy	3–1	Hungary
Rossi 34'; Bettega 35'; Benetti 61'		A. Tóth 81' (pen.)

Estadio José María Minella, Mar del Plata
Attendance: 26,533
Referee: Ramón Barreto (Uruguay)
6 June 1978
19:15 ART

Argentina	2–1	France
Passarella 45' (pen.); Luque 73'		Platini 60'

Estadio Monumental, Buenos Aires
Attendance: 71,666
Referee: Jean Dubach (Switzerland)

10 June 1978
14:30 ART (Note: Initially scheduled at 13:45, the match was delayed as both teams were wearing white shirts.)

France	3–1	Hungary
Lopez 23'; Berdoll 38'; Rocheteau 42'		Zombori 41'

Estadio José María Minella, Mar del Plata
Attendance: 23,127
Referee: Arnaldo Cézar Coelho (Brazil)
10 June 1978
19:15 ART

Argentina	0–1	Italy
		Bettega 67'

Estadio Monumental, Buenos Aires
Attendance: 71,712
Referee: Abraham Klein (Israel)

=== Group 2 ===
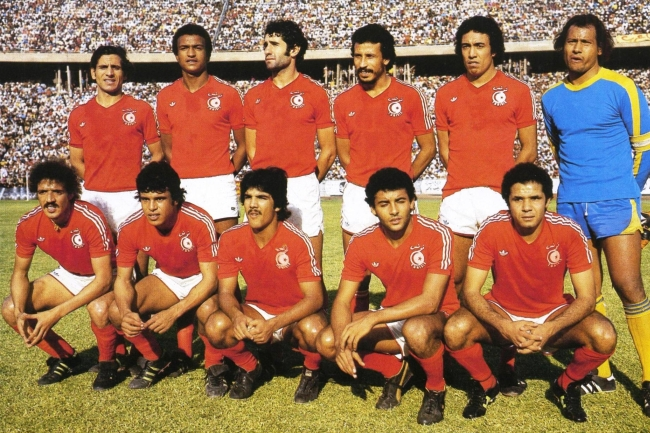
Tunisia at the 1978 FIFA World Cup qualification in Cairo.

Pos	Team	Pld	W	D	L	GF	GA	GD	Pts	Qualification
1	Poland	3	2	1	0	4	1	+3	5	Advance to second round
2	West Germany	3	1	2	0	6	0	+6	4	Advance to second round
3	Tunisia	3	1	1	1	3	2	+1	3	
4	Mexico	3	0	0	3	2	12	−10	0	

Source: FIFA
1 June 1978
15:00 ART

West Germany	0–0	Poland

Estadio Monumental, Buenos Aires
Attendance: 67,579
Referee: Ángel Norberto Coerezza (Argentina)
2 June 1978
16:45 ART

Tunisia	3–1	Mexico
Kaabi 55'; Ghommidh 79'; Dhouieb 87'		Vázquez Ayala 45' (pen.)

Estadio Gigante de Arroyito, Rosario
Attendance: 17,396
Referee: John Gordon (Scotland)

6 June 1978
16:45 ART

West Germany	6–0	Mexico
D. Müller 15'; H. Müller 30'; Rummenigge 38', 73'; Flohe 44', 89'

Estadio Chateau Carreras, Córdoba
Attendance: 35,258
Referee: Farouk Bouzo (Syria)
6 June 1978
16:45 ART

Poland	1–0	Tunisia
Lato 43'

Estadio Gigante de Arroyito, Rosario
Attendance: 9,624
Referee: Ángel Franco Martínez (Spain)

10 June 1978
16:45 ART

West Germany	0–0	Tunisia

Estadio Olímpico Chateau Carreras, Córdoba
Attendance: 30,667
Referee: César Guerrero Orosco (Peru)
10 June 1978
16:45 ART

Poland	3–1	Mexico
Boniek 43', 84'; Deyna 56'		Rangel 52'

Estadio Gigante de Arroyito, Rosario
Attendance: 22,651
Referee: Jafar Namdar (Iran)

=== Group 3 ===
Pos	Team	Pld	W	D	L	GF	GA	GD	Pts	Qualification
1	Austria	3	2	0	1	3	2	+1	4	Advance to second round
2	Brazil	3	1	2	0	2	1	+1	4	Advance to second round
3	Spain	3	1	1	1	2	2	0	3	
4	Sweden	3	0	1	2	1	3	−2	1	

Source: FIFA
3 June 1978
13:45 ART

Austria	2–1	Spain
Schachner 10'; Krankl 76'		Dani 21'

Estadio José Amalfitani, Buenos Aires
Attendance: 40,841
Referee: Károly Palotai (Hungary)
3 June 1978
13:45 ART

Brazil	1–1	Sweden
Reinaldo 45'		Sjöberg 37'

Estadio José Maria Minella, Mar del Plata
Attendance: 32,569
Referee: Clive Thomas (Wales)

7 June 1978
13:45 ART

Austria	1–0	Sweden
Krankl 42' (pen.)

Estadio José Amalfitani, Buenos Aires
Attendance: 41,424
Referee: Charles Corver (Netherlands)
7 June 1978
13:45 ART

Brazil	0–0	Spain

Estadio José Maria Minella, Mar del Plata
Attendance: 34,771
Referee: Sergio Gonella (Italy)

11 June 1978
13:45 ART

Spain	1–0	Sweden
Asensi 75'

Estadio José Amalfitani, Buenos Aires
Attendance: 42,132
Referee: Ferdinand Biwersi (West Germany)
11 June 1978
13:45 ART

Brazil	1–0	Austria
Dinamite 40'

Estadio José Maria Minella, Mar del Plata
Attendance: 35,221
Referee: Robert Wurtz (France)

=== Group 4 ===
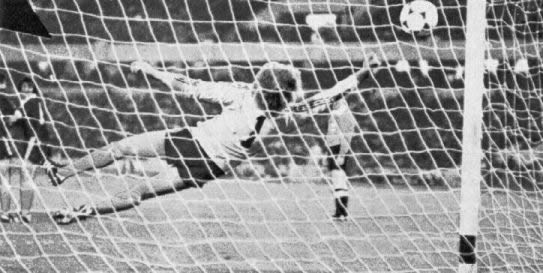
Teófilo Cubillas's free kick for a Peru goal v Scotland

Pos	Team	Pld	W	D	L	GF	GA	GD	Pts	Qualification
1	Peru	3	2	1	0	7	2	+5	5	Advance to second round
2	Netherlands	3	1	1	1	5	3	+2	3	Advance to second round
3	Scotland	3	1	1	1	5	6	−1	3	
4	Iran	3	0	1	2	2	8	−6	1	

Source: FIFA
3 June 1978
16:45 ART

Peru	3–1	Scotland
Cueto 43'; Cubillas 71', 77'		Jordan 14'

Chateau Carreras, Córdoba
Attendance: 37,927
Referee: Ulf Eriksson (Sweden)
3 June 1978
16:45 ART

Netherlands	3–0	Iran
Rensenbrink 40' (pen.), 62', 78' (pen.)

Estadio Ciudad de Mendoza, Mendoza
Attendance: 33,431
Referee: Alfonso González Archundia (Mexico)

7 June 1978
16:45 ART

Scotland	1–1	Iran
Eskandarian 43' (o.g.)		Danaeifard 60'

Estadio Chateau Carreras, Córdoba
Attendance: 7,938
Referee: Youssou N'Diaye (Senegal)
7 June 1978
16:45 ART

Netherlands	0–0	Peru

Estadio Ciudad de Mendoza, Mendoza
Attendance: 28,125
Referee: Adolf Prokop (East Germany)

11 June 1978
16:45 ART

Peru	4–1	Iran
Velásquez 2'; Cubillas 36' (pen.), 39' (pen.), 79'		Rowshan 41'

Estadio Chateau Carreras, Córdoba
Attendance: 21,262
Referee: Alojzy Jarguz (Poland)
11 June 1978
16:45 ART

Scotland	3–2	Netherlands
Dalglish 45'; A. Gemmill 46' (pen.), 68'		Rensenbrink 34' (pen.); Rep 71'

Estadio Ciudad de Mendoza, Mendoza
Attendance: 35,130
Referee: Erich Linemayr (Austria)

== Second group stage ==
=== Group A ===
Pos	Team	Pld	W	D	L	GF	GA	GD	Pts	Qualification
1	Netherlands	3	2	1	0	9	4	+5	5	Advance to final
2	Italy	3	1	1	1	2	2	0	3	Advance to match for third place
3	West Germany	3	0	2	1	4	5	−1	2	
4	Austria	3	1	0	2	4	8	−4	2	

Source: FIFA
14 June 1978
13:45 ART

Austria	1–5	Netherlands
Obermayer 80'		Brandts 6'; Rensenbrink 35' (pen.); Rep 36', 53'; W. van de Kerkhof 82'

Estadio Chateau Carreras, Córdoba
Attendance: 25,050
Referee: John Gordon (Scotland)
14 June 1978
13:45 ART

Italy	0–0	West Germany

Estadio Monumental, Buenos Aires
Attendance: 67,547
Referee: Dušan Maksimović (Yugoslavia)

18 June 1978
16:45 ART

Netherlands	2–2	West Germany
Haan 27'; R. van de Kerkhof 82'		Abramczik 3'; D. Müller 70'

Estadio Chateau Carreras, Córdoba
Attendance: 40,750
Referee: Ramón Barreto (Uruguay)
18 June 1978
16:45 ART

Italy	1–0	Austria
Rossi 13'

Estadio Monumental, Buenos Aires
Attendance: 66,695
Referee: Francis Rion (Belgium)

21 June 1978
13:45 ART

Austria	3–2	West Germany
Vogts 59' (o.g.); Krankl 66', 87'		Rummenigge 19'; Hölzenbein 68'

Estadio Olímpico Chateau Carreras, Córdoba
Attendance: 38,318
Referee: Abraham Klein (Israel)
21 June 1978
13:45 ART

Italy	1–2	Netherlands
Brandts 19' (o.g.)		Brandts 49'; Haan 76'

Estadio Monumental, Buenos Aires
Attendance: 67,433
Referee: Ángel Franco Martínez (Spain)

=== Group B ===
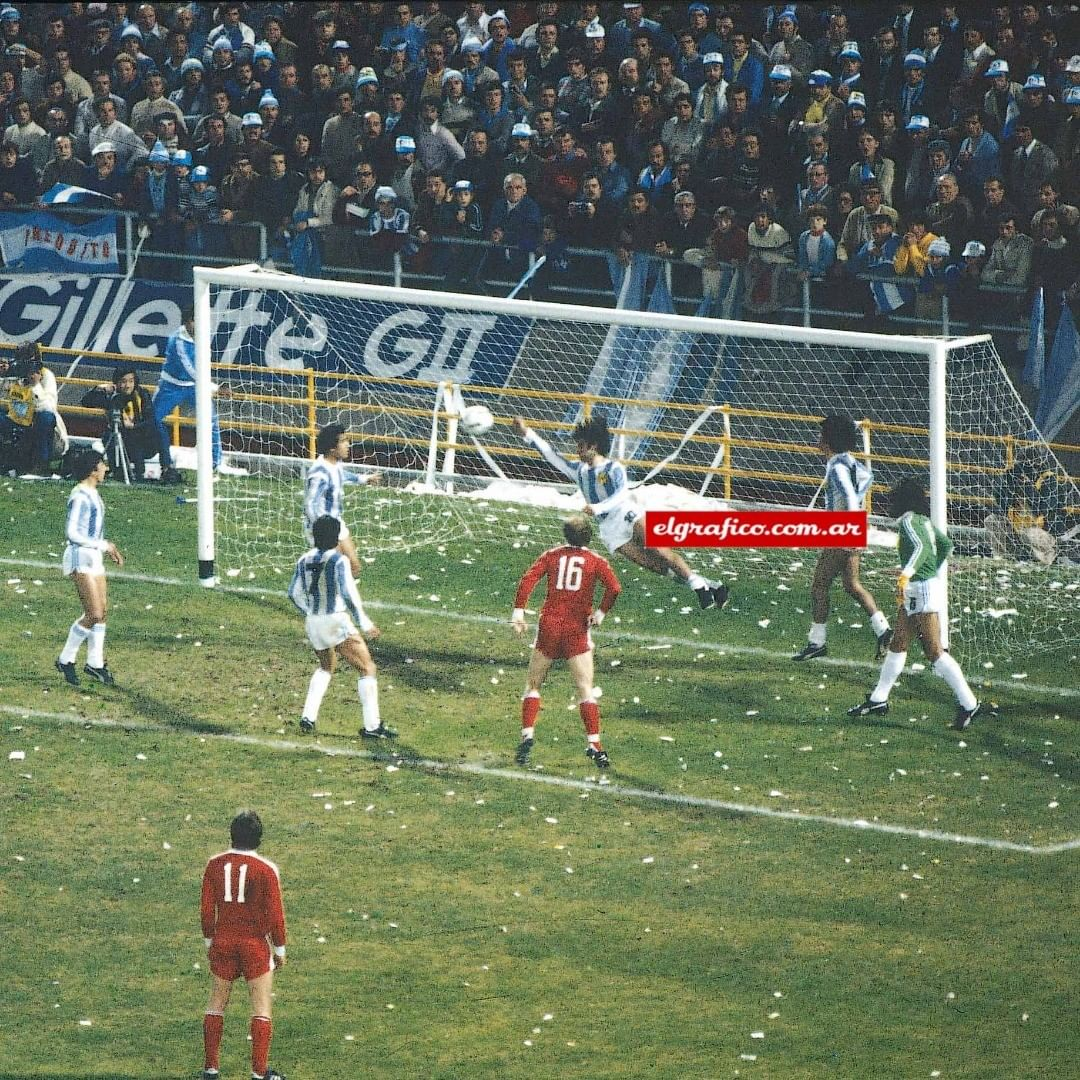
Mario Kempes saving Argentina goal with his hand so the referee awarded a penalty kick to Poland

Pos	Team	Pld	W	D	L	GF	GA	GD	Pts	Qualification
1	Argentina	3	2	1	0	8	0	+8	5	Advance to final
2	Brazil	3	2	1	0	6	1	+5	5	Advance to match for third place
3	Poland	3	1	0	2	2	5	−3	2	
4	Peru	3	0	0	3	0	10	−10	0	

Source: FIFA
14 June 1978
16:45 ART

Brazil	3–0	Peru
Dirceu 15', 27'; Zico 72' (pen.)

Estadio Ciudad de Mendoza, Mendoza
Attendance: 31,278
Referee: Nicolae Rainea (Romania)
14 June 1978
19:15 ART

Argentina	2–0	Poland
Kempes 16', 71'

Estadio Gigante de Arroyito, Rosario
Attendance: 37,091
Referee: Ulf Eriksson (Sweden)

18 June 1978
13:45 ART

Peru	0–1	Poland
		Szarmach 65'

Estadio Ciudad de Mendoza, Mendoza
Attendance: 35,288
Referee: Pat Partridge (England)
18 June 1978
19:15 ART

Argentina	0–0	Brazil

Estadio Gigante de Arroyito, Rosario
Attendance: 37,326
Referee: Károly Palotai (Hungary)

21 June 1978
16:45 ART

Brazil	3–1	Poland
Nelinho 13'; Dinamite 58', 63'		Lato 45'

Estadio Ciudad de Mendoza, Mendoza
Attendance: 39,586
Referee: Juan Silvagno Cavanna (Chile)
21 June 1978
19:15 ART

Argentina	6–0	Peru
Kempes 21', 49'; Tarantini 43'; Luque 50', 72'; Houseman 67'

Estadio Gigante de Arroyito, Rosario
Attendance: 37,315
Referee: Robert Wurtz (France)

== Knockout stage ==
=== Match for third place ===
24 June 1978
15:00 ART

Brazil	2–1	Italy
Nelinho 64'; Dirceu 71'		Causio 38'

River Plate Stadium, Buenos Aires
Attendance: 69,659
Referee: Abraham Klein (Israel)

=== Final ===
25 June 1978
15:00 UTC−3

Argentina	3–1 (a.e.t.)	Netherlands
Kempes 38', 105'; Bertoni 115'		Nanninga 82'

River Plate Stadium, Buenos Aires
Attendance: 71,483
Referee: Sergio Gonella (Italy)

== Statistics ==
=== Goalscorers ===
With six goals, Mario Kempes was the top scorer in the tournament. In total, 102 goals were scored by 62 players, with three of them credited as own goals.

6 goals

- (Argentina) Mario Kempes

5 goals

- (Netherlands) Rob Rensenbrink
- (Peru) Teófilo Cubillas

4 goals

- (Argentina) Leopoldo Luque
- (Austria) Hans Krankl

3 goals

- (Brazil) Dirceu
- (Brazil) Roberto Dinamite
- (Italy) Paolo Rossi
- (Netherlands) Johnny Rep
- (West Germany) Karl-Heinz Rummenigge

2 goals

- (Argentina) Daniel Bertoni
- (Brazil) Nelinho
- (Italy) Roberto Bettega
- (Netherlands) Ernie Brandts
- (Netherlands) Arie Haan
- (Poland) Zbigniew Boniek
- (Poland) Grzegorz Lato
- (Scotland) Archie Gemmill
- (West Germany) Heinz Flohe
- (West Germany) Dieter Müller

1 goal

- (Argentina) René Houseman
- (Argentina) Daniel Passarella
- (Argentina) Alberto Tarantini
- (Austria) Erich Obermayer
- (Austria) Walter Schachner
- (Brazil) Reinaldo
- (Brazil) Zico
- (France) Marc Berdoll
- (France) Bernard Lacombe
- (France) Christian Lopez
- (France) Michel Platini
- (France) Dominique Rocheteau
- (Hungary) Károly Csapó
- (Hungary) András Tóth
- (Hungary) Sándor Zombori
- (Iran) Iraj Danaeifard
- (Iran) Hassan Rowshan
- (Italy) Romeo Benetti
- (Italy) Franco Causio
- (Italy) Renato Zaccarelli
- (Mexico) Víctor Rangel
- (Mexico) Arturo Vázquez Ayala
- (Netherlands) Dick Nanninga
- (Netherlands) René van de Kerkhof
- (Netherlands) Willy van de Kerkhof
- (Peru) César Cueto
- (Peru) José Velásquez
- (Poland) Kazimierz Deyna
- (Poland) Andrzej Szarmach
- (Scotland) Kenny Dalglish
- (Scotland) Joe Jordan
- (Spain) Juan Manuel Asensi
- (Spain) Dani
- (Sweden) Thomas Sjöberg
- (Tunisia) Mokhtar Dhouieb
- (Tunisia) Néjib Ghommidh
- (Tunisia) Ali Kaabi
- (West Germany) Rüdiger Abramczik
- (West Germany) Bernd Hölzenbein
- (West Germany) Hansi Müller

Own goals

- (Iran) Andranik Eskandarian (against Scotland)
- (Netherlands) Ernie Brandts (against Italy)
- (West Germany) Berti Vogts (against Austria)

=== Awards (Unofficial winner) ===
A group of journalists and experts selected the best player of the 1978 tournament, and their selection is recognised by the FIFA website. FIFA recognises only this selection besides the Golden Ball award. Hans Krankl received the same number of votes as Dirceu at the time, and was not chosen as the third best player by FIFA later.

Best player
Winner	Runner-up	Third place
(Argentina) Mario Kempes	(Italy) Paolo Rossi	(Brazil) Dirceu

=== Team of the Tournament ===
FIFA selected the following players for the 1978 FIFA World Cup All-Star Team.

Goalkeeper	Defenders	Midfielders	Forwards
(Argentina) Ubaldo Fillol	(Netherlands) Ruud Krol (Argentina) Daniel Passarella (Argentina) Alberto Tarantini (Germany) Berti Vogts	(Peru) Teófilo Cubillas (Brazil) Dirceu	(Italy) Roberto Bettega (Argentina) Mario Kempes (Netherlands) Rob Rensenbrink (Italy) Paolo Rossi

=== Tournament ranking ===
In 1986, FIFA published a report that ranked all teams in each World Cup up to and including 1986, based on progress in the competition and overall results. The rankings for the 1978 tournament were as follows:

Per statistical convention in football, matches decided in extra time are counted as wins and losses.

Pos	Grp	Team	Pld	W	D	L	GF	GA	GD	Pts	Final result
1	1/B	Argentina (H)	7	5	1	1	15	4	+11	11	Champions
2	4/A	Netherlands	7	3	2	2	15	10	+5	8	Runners-up
3	3/B	Brazil	7	4	3	0	10	3	+7	11	Third place
4	1/A	Italy	7	4	1	2	9	6	+3	9	Fourth place
5	2/B	Poland	6	3	1	2	6	6	0	7	Eliminated in second group stage
6	2/A	West Germany	6	1	4	1	10	5	+5	6	Eliminated in second group stage
7	3/A	Austria	6	3	0	3	7	10	−3	6	Eliminated in second group stage
8	4/B	Peru	6	2	1	3	7	12	−5	5	Eliminated in second group stage
9	2	Tunisia	3	1	1	1	3	2	+1	3	Eliminated in first group stage
10	3	Spain	3	1	1	1	2	2	0	3	Eliminated in first group stage
11	4	Scotland	3	1	1	1	5	6	−1	3	Eliminated in first group stage
12	1	France	3	1	0	2	5	5	0	2	Eliminated in first group stage
13	3	Sweden	3	0	1	2	1	3	−2	1	Eliminated in first group stage
14	4	Iran	3	0	1	2	2	8	−6	1	Eliminated in first group stage
15	1	Hungary	3	0	0	3	3	8	−5	0	Eliminated in first group stage
16	2	Mexico	3	0	0	3	2	12	−10	0	Eliminated in first group stage

Source: FIFA
(H) Hosts

== Controversies ==
=== Political turmoil and human rights ===
A controversy surrounding the 1978 World Cup was that only two years prior to the competition the Argentine government of Isabel Perón had been replaced in a coup d'état by a military dictatorship known as the National Reorganization Process. Between the time that the military junta took over government and the time the World Cup started, foreign journalists were concerned about how Argentine newspaper reporters and editors were being treated by the regime, in attempting to get leftist members out of the picture. The new government targeted any parts of society that they saw were trying to undermine them. Less than a year before the World Cup, in September 1977, Interior Minister General Albano Harguindeguy, stated that 5,618 people had recently disappeared. The infamous Higher School of Mechanics of the Navy (known by its acronym ESMA) held concentration camp prisoners of the Dirty War and those held captive reportedly could hear the roars of the crowd during matches held at River Plate's Monumental Stadium, located only a mile away; prompting comparisons to Adolf Hitler's and Benito Mussolini's alleged political manipulation of sports during the 1936 Berlin Olympics and 1934 FIFA World Cup respectively. The junta also practised censorship since it was established, which encouraged less reports on the real situation in Argentina. This was done as an attempt to change the character of the Argentine people.

During the buildup to the tournament, the military dictatorship viewed the World Cup as a strategic opportunity to legitimise its rule and promote an image of stability amid widespread repression. Scholars argue that the junta spent enormously on stadiums, infrastructure, and propaganda campaigns, not for economic development but to stage an international spectacle capable of masking state terror. Government-controlled media portrayed Argentina as peaceful and orderly, while international correspondents later reported censorship, surveillance, and restrictions on movement while covering the event.

Just months before the World Cup, the Argentine regime launched a campaign to silence any disapproval of the government from the people. However, over the course of the tournament, the regime ceased the operation to avoid displaying their authoritarianism and receiving criticism from all over the world, but international newspapers and human rights organisations had already criticised Argentina as host for the next World Cup.

The presence of ESMA so close to the Monumental Stadium became a powerful symbol of the contradictions of the tournament. Testimonies collected after the dictatorship describe prisoners hearing match-day cheers while torture and interrogations occurred inside the facility. Historians note that these overlapping soundscapes underscore how national celebration and clandestine state violence coexisted during the event, shaping later memory of the World Cup as both a moment of sporting triumph and a period of profound human rights abuse.

The military forces that had control over Argentina at the time wanted to hold that power for as long as they could, but with a different perspective. The use of repression, torture, kidnapping, and assassination was becoming an everyday reality, with 30,000 people murdered between 1976 and 1983, the end of the dictatorship. People wondered why FIFA would allow the World Cup to go on under these circumstances and that 15 other countries, most of which are old democracies, would participate in the tournament. However, it is simply because of the dominant notion that football or soccer, or any sport for that matter, belong to civil society, giving the assumption that state policies wouldn't interfere with the passion and enthusiasm of fans.

Civil society groups, most notably the Mothers of the Plaza de Mayo, used the World Cup’s global visibility to denounce the disappearance of their children. They held weekly marches during the tournament, attracting foreign journalists and making the dictatorship’s human rights record visible to international audiences for the first time. Their activism challenged the junta’s effort to project unity and control during the games and became foundational to human rights mobilisation in Argentina.

International observers widely noted that the dictatorship attempted to use the World Cup to normalise Argentina’s global image. According to historians, military leaders believed that a successful tournament would showcase Argentina as a modern, orderly nation while drawing attention away from the forced disappearances, torture centers, and mass repression taking place at the same time. This strategy mirrored efforts by earlier authoritarian regimes, such as those in Nazi Germany and Fascist Italy, which relied on major sporting events to project legitimacy and political strength.

Despite the regime’s censorship apparatus, foreign journalists in Argentina continued reporting on the growing number of desaparecidos and the repressive climate. Many correspondents described a palpable military presence in the streets, with frequent ID checks, unmarked cars, and armed patrols near stadiums and transportation hubs. These accounts helped counter the junta’s attempt to use the World Cup as a distraction and contributed to broader international condemnation of state violence.

The government invested more than ten times the original projected budget for the tournament, a financial decision scholars consider politically motivated rather than economically rational. The overspending contributed to rising inflation and public debt that later intensified Argentina’s economic crisis in the early 1980s. In this sense, the World Cup not only intersected with the dictatorship’s political agenda but also deepened the long-term financial instability that emerged as a defining feature of the regime’s final years.

From Will Hersey's article "Remembering Argentina 1978: The Dirtiest World Cup of All Time":

The other teams in Argentina and Hungary's group were the much-fancied France and Italy, establishing the tournament's toughest qualifying section. After the victory against Hungary, one junta official remarked to Leopoldo Luque that "this could turn out to be the group of death as far as you are concerned." It was delivered with a smile. "Uppermost in my mind was that earlier that day, the brother of a close friend of mine had disappeared", recalled Luque. "His body was later found by villagers on the banks of the River Plate with concrete attached to his legs. At that time, opponents of the regime were sometimes thrown out of aeroplanes into the sea."

==== Protests ====
Because of the political turmoil, some countries, most notably the Netherlands and Sweden, considered publicly whether they should participate in the event. Despite this, all teams eventually took part without restrictions. However, most notably, Dutch star Johan Cruyff, who was considered the best player in the previous 1974 FIFA World Cup, refused to take part in the 1978 World Cup, even though he earlier participated in the 1978 FIFA World Cup qualification. Allegations that Cruyff refused to participate because of political convictions were denied by him 30 years later—he and his family had been the victims of a kidnapping attempt a few months before the tournament. Several criminals entered his house in Barcelona at night and tied him and his family up at gunpoint. One player, Ralf Edström, was arrested for speaking to someone in Buenos Aires; however, the Argentine military released him upon recognising that he was a Swedish footballer, not an ordinary person.

Amnesty International announced their strategy for Argentina in 1978. After their awareness that urging people away from the World Cup could produce counter-sympathy for the junta, they launched a campaign that would teach journalists to write about the tournament but based on the regime, along with the slogan "Football yes, torture no." They hoped that the journalists would turn their eyes away from the matches and look at what's going on in their society to educate their readers on the reality of Argentina.

French activists also organised some of the largest international protests against the tournament. In Paris, human-rights groups and left-wing political movements formed COBA (Comité pour le Boycott de l’Argentine), which produced posters, newsletters, and public demonstrations calling attention to the dictatorship. By 1978, over 200 local COBA committees existed across France, illustrating the extent to which the World Cup had become a focal point for transnational activism.

Paris was a center of unanimity for the victims of the Argentine dictatorship, which launched a campaign to boycott the 1978 World Cup. In the city, they made posters, publications or any kind of information that expressed opposition to the World Cup under a dictatorship. The first calls to boycott were published in the daily Le Monde in October 1977. Later, a boycott committee was organised, which brought together human-rights militants and left-wing activists. This organisation came to be known as COBA, a French acronym for, "Committee for the Boycott of the World Cup in Argentina." It wasn't long before the COBA had established a strong base of unity and protest throughout France, with more than 200 local COBA committees created in major cities and provinces.

Enriqueta Maroni, member of the Mothers of Plaza de Mayo, became internationally known after being interviewed by Dutch television where she told openly about the crimes of the dictatorship.

Outside Latin America and Europe, human rights organisations in the United States, Canada, and Australia also launched independent campaigns to draw attention to the dictatorship’s crimes. Amnesty International chapters across North America published fact sheets about forced disappearances and organised letter-writing drives to pressure FIFA and national governments to condemn Argentina’s repression. Although these efforts did not lead to a boycott, they helped internationalise the human rights movement that grew dramatically in the late 1970s.

Sports magazines and newspapers in several countries ran dual coverage of both the athletic tournament and the political situation. Some outlets published investigative reports on secret detention centers and testimonies from exiled Argentines. These stories challenged the junta’s narrative that Argentina was safe, unified, and politically stable. The visibility of these reports demonstrated the limits of the regime’s propaganda efforts and revealed how global media attention complicated the dictatorship’s attempt to control information.

Scholars note that the political debate surrounding the 1978 World Cup marked one of the earliest moments when international sporting events were openly criticised as potential instruments of authoritarian image-making. This contributed to broader discussions about the ethics of hosting major competitions in non-democratic states, foreshadowing contemporary debates about “sportswashing” in global politics.

=== Match fixing ===
Argentina's controversial and favourable decisions in their matches have caused many to view their eventual win as illegitimate; many cite the political climate and worldwide pressure on the Argentine government as the reason for these decisions. Desperate to prove their stability and prominence to the world after their coup two years earlier, the government used whatever means necessary to ensure that the team would progress far in the tournament.

Academic research has emphasised that while no conclusive proof of government-orchestrated match fixing exists, circumstantial evidence—including diplomatic pressure, economic negotiations, and testimonies from Peruvian officials—has sustained debate for decades. The high political stakes for the junta, which relied on World Cup success to bolster its legitimacy, intensified suspicions surrounding Argentina’s 6–0 victory over Peru.

Suspicions of match fixing arose even before the tournament began; Lajos Baróti, the head coach of Argentina's first opponents, Hungary, said that "everything, even the air, is in favor of Argentina". He also talked about the financial imperative to have Argentina win the World Cup: "The success of Argentina is financially so important to the tournament".

More controversy surrounded the host, Argentina, as all of their games in the first round kicked off at night, giving the Argentines the advantage of knowing where they stood in the group. This issue would arise again in Spain 1982, which prompted FIFA to change the rules so that the final two group games in subsequent World Cups (as well as in every other international tournament, starting with the UEFA Euro 1984) would be played simultaneously. In their second group stage game against France, Argentina were the beneficiaries of multiple favourable calls. After France were denied what looked to be a clear penalty in the first half, an anonymous French player said he had heard the referee tell Daniel Passarella (the player who committed the foul), "Don't do that again please, or I might have to actually give it next time."

==== Argentina v Peru ====
Further accusations have surrounded the game Argentina and Peru played in the second round of the tournament. Following Brazil's 3–1 win over Poland, Argentina needed to win by a margin of four goals to proceed to the final and did so by defeating Peru by 6–0. There were allegations that the authoritarian Argentine military government interfered to ensure Argentina would defeat Peru through intimidation, though these were denied by Peruvian captain Héctor Chumpitaz and several Peruvian players. Some accusations originated in the Brazilian media and pointed to the fact that the Peruvian goalkeeper, Ramón Quiroga, had been born in Argentina. There was also an alleged deal, reported by the British media as an anonymous rumour, that involved the delivery of a large grain shipment to Peru by Argentina and the unfreezing of a Peruvian bank account that was held by the Argentine Central Bank. Another alleged deal, recounted by the son of a Colombian drug lord in a controversial book, involved the Peruvian team being bribed without any political implications. A third alleged deal, described by the Peruvian leftist ex-senator Genaro Ledesma, encompassed sending 13 Peruvian dissidents exiled in Argentina back to Peru.

Three months before the World Cup, Argentina had beaten Peru 3–1 in Lima, their head-to-head record was 15–3 in favour of the host nation, and Peru had never beaten Argentina away from home. However, Peru had conceded only six goals in their previous five games in the World Cup. During the first half, Peru hit the post twice after two counters when the game was 0–0. Argentina managed to get 2–0 ahead before the end of the first 45 minutes. During the second half, Argentina was 4–0 ahead when Peru had another clear chance. Argentina kept attacking and scored twice more, making it 6–0 and surpassing the required margin.

The match has since become one of the most studied games in World Cup history, not because of its tactical content but because of its entanglement with Cold War politics, inter-American relations, and the symbolic weight of Argentina’s authoritarian context. Whether or not any explicit arrangement occurred, the game remains a key example of how international football can become deeply intertwined with political strategies and national narratives.

=== Absence of Diego Maradona ===
There was also some domestic controversy as well, as Argentine manager César Luis Menotti did not call up the then-17-year-old Argentinos Juniors local star Diego Maradona, for Menotti felt Maradona was too young to handle the pressures of such an important tournament on home soil and that the expectations of the team's performance would probably revolve around the Buenos Aires-born youngster. In addition, Maradona's usual position of number 10 (play-making attacking midfielder) was taken by Mario Kempes, who ended up as the Best Player and Top Goal Scorer.

The debate over Maradona’s omission remains a reminder of how individual players were affected by the tournament’s political stakes. While some argue that Menotti’s decision was strictly athletic, others point to the broader pressures and uncertainties surrounding public life under the junta as contextual factors that shaped coaching choices.
