= Peru national football team results (unofficial matches) =

National football team results (unofficial matches)

This is a list of results for all the unofficial matches played by the Peru national football team.

== Results ==
Key Win Draw Loss

=== 1920s ===
24 November 1929 Friendly	Nacional (Uruguay)	1–0	Peru	Montevideo, Uruguay
	Scarone	Report		Stadium: Estadio Gran Parque Central; Referee: Domingo Lombardi (Uruguay)

=== 1930s ===
1930 Friendly	Peru	2–2	(Argentina) Sportivo Buenos Aires	Lima, Peru

2 January 1930 Friendly	Peru	1–3	(Argentina) Atlético Tucumán	Lima, Peru
		Report	Fassora; Rea

February 1930 Friendly	Peru	1–0	(Argentina) Atlético Tucumán	Lima, Peru
		Report

25 May 1930 Friendly	Peru	0–2	(Peru) Alianza Lima	Lima, Peru
		Report	García 1'; Lavalle 60'	Stadium: Estadio Nacional; Attendance: 15,000; Referee: Luis Repetto (Peru)

29 July 1930 Friendly	Peñarol (Uruguay)	4–1	Peru	Montevideo, Uruguay
	Canavesi; Rodríguez Nue; Villanueva; Cillóniz	Report	Campolo	Stadium: Estadio Pocitos

6 June 1936 Friendly	Peru	3–1	(Peru) Sullana XI	Peru

=== 1940s ===
1947 Friendly	Peru	4–4	(Peru) Alfonso Ugarte de Chiclín	Peru

=== 1950s ===
21 February 1959 Friendly	Peru	0–0	(Brazil) SE Palmeiras	Lima, Peru
		Report		Stadium: Estadio Nacional; Attendance: 26,612; Referee: Erwin Hieger (Austria)

24 February 1959 Friendly	Peru	1–2	(Brazil) SE Palmeiras	Lima, Peru
	Joya 27'	Report	Carabina 39'; Parada 86'	Stadium: Estadio Nacional; Referee: Fritz Mayer (Austria)

4 March 1959 Friendly	Peru	3–0	(Peru) Unión América	Callao, Peru
				Stadium: Estadio Telmo Carbajo

May 1959 Friendly	Peru	1–0	(Peru) Unión América	Peru
	Loayza

12 May 1959 Friendly	Peru	0–1	(Peru) Ciclista Lima	Peru

=== 1960s ===
March 1961 Friendly	Peru	3–0	(Peru) Sport Boys	Peru

13 May 1962 Friendly	Peru	1–4	(Spain) Real Zaragoza	Lima, Peru
	Lobatón 88'	Report	Seminario 16' (pen.), 81'; Chapela 55'; Marcelino 69'	Stadium: Estadio Nacional; Attendance: 26,210; Referee: Arturo Yamasaki (Peru)

16 May 1962 Friendly	Peru	3–1	(Spain) Real Zaragoza	Lima, Peru
	Zegarra 41', 81'; Flores 51'	Report	Chapela 42'	Stadium: Estadio Nacional; Referee: Alberto Tejada (Peru)

18 April 1965 Friendly	Atlético Grau (Peru)	2–1	Peru	Piura, Peru
	Dioses 79'; Córdova	Report	Zegarra 69' (pen.)	Stadium: Estadio Miguel Grau; Attendance: 7,000

28 April 1965 Friendly	Peru	4–1	(Peru) Atlético Grau	Lima, Peru
	Mosquera; Fernández; Rodríguez; Iwasaki		Suárez	Stadium: Estadio Nacional

25 May 1969 Friendly	Pichincha XI (Ecuador)	1–1	Peru	Quito, Ecuador
	Contreras 60'	Report	León 39'	Stadium: Estadio Olímpico Atahualpa; Attendance: 15,000

22 July 1969 Friendly	Peru	3–0	(Brazil) Grêmio	Lima, Peru
	Gallardo 37'; León 45'; Campos 60'			Stadium: Estadio Nacional; Referee: Alberto Tejada (Peru)

25 July 1969 Friendly	Peru	1–1	(Brazil) Grêmio	Lima, Peru
	Gallardo 79'	Report	Alcindo 7'	Stadium: Estadio Nacional

1 October 1969 Friendly	Peru	1–0	Universidad de Chile	Lima, Peru
	León 81'			Stadium: Estadio Nacional

1969 Friendly	Peru	3–1	(Peru) Arequipa XI	Peru
	Cubillas; Ramírez	Report	Márquez

=== 1970s ===
17 January 1970 Friendly	Peru	2–2	(Socialist Federal Republic of Yugoslavia) Dinamo Zagreb	Lima, Peru
	León; Gallardo	Report		Stadium: Estadio Nacional

21 January 1970 Friendly	Peru	2–1	(Socialist Federal Republic of Yugoslavia) Dinamo Zagreb	Lima, Peru
	Sotil	Report		Stadium: Estadio Nacional

27 January 1970 Friendly	Peru	3–2	(Czech Republic) Sparta Prague	Lima, Peru
	Cubillas 15', 23'; Gallardo 85'		Kuna 54'; Svec 80'	Stadium: Estadio Nacional

30 January 1970 Friendly	Peru	1–1	(Czech Republic) Sparta Prague	Lima, Peru
	Sotil 78'		Fandel 51'	Stadium: Estadio Nacional

11 February 1970 Friendly	Peru	2–2	(Poland) Górnik Zabrze	Lima, Peru
	Zegarra 80'; Ramírez 85'		Lubański 8', 15'	Stadium: Estadio Nacional; Attendance: 10,665; Referee: Enrique Labó (Peru)

28 March 1970 Friendly	SC Internacional (Brazil)	3–0	Peru	Porto Alegre, Brazil
	Mosquito 2'; Claudiomiro 10', 69'			Stadium: Estádio Beira-Rio; Referee: Agomar Martins (Brazil)

3 April 1970 Friendly	Juan Aurich (Peru)	1–3	Peru	Chiclayo, Peru
				Stadium: Estadio Elías Aguirre

24 April 1970 Friendly	Peru	2–0	(Brazil) SC Internacional	Lima, Peru
	Valmir (o.g.); Cubillas	Report		Stadium: Estadio Nacional; Attendance: 28,307; Referee: Alberto Tejada (Peru)

27 April 1970 Friendly	Peru	0–2	(Brazil) SC Internacional	Lima, Peru
		Report		Stadium: Estadio Nacional

13 May 1970 Friendly	Unión de Curtidores (Mexico)	2–1	Peru	León, Mexico
	Padilla 68'; Mendoza 79'		Cubillas 34' (pen.)	Stadium: Estadio de la Unión de Curtidores; Attendance: 10,000

11 February 1971 Friendly	Peru	4–0	South Korea XI	Lima, Peru
	Cubillas; Mifflin; Rojas; Sotil	Report

8 April 1972 Friendly	Club Puebla (Mexico)	1–0	Peru	Puebla, Mexico
	Borja 81'			Stadium: Estadio Cuauhtémoc

12 April 1972 Friendly	Maghreb	1–1	Peru	Algiers, Algeria
	Betrouni	Report	Rojas	Stadium: Stade du 5 Juillet; Attendance: 15,000; Referee: Abdelkader Aouissi (Algeria)

24 January 1973 Training game	Peru A	3–3	Peru B	Lima, Peru
	Sotil; Cubillas (pen.); Muñante		Barbadillo; Rojas; Palacios

February 1973 Training game	Peru A	5–2	Peru B	Lima, Peru
	Cubillas; Ramírez; Muñante ?

February 1973 Friendly	Peru	4–1	Peru XI	Peru

7 March 1973 Friendly	Peru	2–0	(Argentina) Independiente	Lima, Peru
	Cubillas 76', 85'	Report		Stadium: Estadio Nacional; Referee: Carlos Rivera (Peru)

10 March 1973 Friendly	Peru	2–1	(Uruguay) Defensor Sporting	Lima, Peru
	Rojas; Sotil	Report		Stadium: Estadio Nacional

14 March 1973 Friendly	Peru	1–2	(Argentina) Rosario Central	Lima, Peru
	Quesada	Report	? Bóveda	Stadium: Estadio Nacional

21 March 1973 Friendly	Peru	0–0	(Argentina) Racing Club	Lima, Peru
		Report

4 April 1973 Friendly	SC Internacional (Brazil)	1–1	Peru	Porto Alegre, Brazil
	Claudiomiro		Quesada

11 April 1973 Friendly	Peru	3–0	(Brazil) SC Internacional	Lima, Peru
	Ramírez			Stadium: Estadio Nacional

15 April 1973 Friendly	Peru	2–0	(Argentina) San Lorenzo	Lima, Peru
	Piris 37' (o.g.); Sotil 64'	Report		Stadium: Estadio Nacional; Attendance: 29,193; Referee: Ramón Barreto (Uruguay)

19 April 1973 Friendly	Peru	1–0	(Peru) Alianza Lima	Lima, Peru
	Cubillas 15'	Report		Stadium: Estadio Nacional; Attendance: 21,014; Referee: Edison Pérez (Peru)

7 May 1973 Friendly	Peru	2–0	(Argentina) Argentinos Juniors	Lima, Peru
	Sotil; Quesada	Report

27 June 1973 Training game	Peru A	1–2	Peru B	Lima, Peru
	Ramírez		Bailetti; Mifflin

5 July 1973 Friendly	Peru	4–1	(Uruguay) Nacional	Lima, Peru
	Sotil 36'; Ramírez 56', 86'; Rivero 81'		Suárez 16'	Stadium: Estadio Nacional; Attendance: 24,000; Referee: Carlos Rivero (Peru)

11 July 1973 Friendly	Peru	2–1	(Uruguay) Peñarol	Lima, Peru
	Bailetti 7'; Carbonell 17'	Report	Quevedo 71'	Stadium: Estadio Nacional; Attendance: 20,000; Referee: Luis Gonzáles (Peru)

18 July 1973 Friendly	Peru	4–2	(Argentina) Gimnasia y Esgrima LP	Lima, Peru
	Chumpitaz; Bailetti; Ramírez 17'		Villagra; Bulla	Attendance: 20,000

22 July 1973 Friendly	Peru	2–1	(Argentina) Independiente	Lima, Peru
	Bailetti 30'; Sotil 48'	Report	Bertoni 42'	Stadium: Estadio Nacional; Attendance: 42,852

29 July 1973 Friendly	Asociación de mutualistas (Uruguay)	1–3	Peru	Montevideo, Uruguay
		Report	Sotil; Daga; Manzo	Stadium: Estadio Centenario

2 August 1973 60-minute Training game	Montevideo Wanderers F.C. (Uruguay)	0–1	Peru	Montevideo, Uruguay
			Sotil

22 May 1975 Training game	Peru A	6–1	Peru B	Peru
	Estrada; Palacios; Rivero; Velásquez; Gómez		Gonzales

5 June 1975 Friendly	Deportivo Junín (Peru)	0–2	Peru	Huancayo, Peru
			Vargas 30'; Quesada 43'	Stadium: Estadio IV Centenario

10 June 1975 Friendly	Peru	1–1	Resto de América	Lima, Peru
15:30 UTC−5	Quesada 71'	Report	Kempes 81' (pen.)	Stadium: Estadio Alianza Lima; Attendance: 30,000; Referee: Edison Pérez (Peru)

20 July 1975 Friendly	FBC Melgar (Peru)	1–1	Peru	Arequipa, Peru
	Chumpitaz		Ramírez (pen.)	Attendance: 10,736; Referee: Enrique Montes (Peru)

23 July 1975 Friendly	FBC Melgar (Peru)	1–2	Peru	Arequipa, Peru
			Díaz; Ramírez	Attendance: 7,492

17 August 1975 Friendly	Peru	2–1	(Peru) Sporting Cristal	Lima, Peru
	Oblitas; Ramírez		Vargas	Stadium: Estadio Alianza Lima

29 August 1975 Training game	Peru A	3–1	Peru B	Lima, Peru
	Casaretto; Vargas		Jaime

31 August 1975 Friendly	Peru	2–1	(Argentina) Unión de Santa Fe	Lima, Peru
	Casaretto 31', 49'	Report	Mastrángelo	Stadium: Estadio Alianza Lima

3 September 1975 Friendly	Juan Aurich (Peru)	1–1	Peru	Chiclayo, Peru
	Bolívar		Ramírez	Stadium: Estadio Elías Aguirre; Attendance: 5,000

7 September 1975 Friendly	Peru	1–2	(Peru) Unión Huaral	Peru
	Casaretto		Rodríguez; Luces

September 1975 Training game	Peru A	1–4	Peru B	Peru
	Navarro		Cueto; Leturia; Gómez

24 September 1975 Training game	Peru A	2–0	Peru B	Lima, Peru
	Quesada			Stadium: Estadio Nacional

9 November 1975 Friendly	Peru	0–0	(Portugal) FC Porto	Lima, Peru
		Report		Stadium: Estadio Alianza Lima

12 November 1975 Friendly	Peru	0–2	(Portugal) FC Porto	Lima, Peru
			Pedrinho; Dinis	Stadium: Estadio Nacional; Attendance: 23,206

16 June 1976 Friendly	Peru	2–2	(Peru) Lima XI	Lima, Peru
	Cueto; Quesada 89'		Luces; Mosquera 66'	Stadium: Estadio Nacional; Attendance: 13,825

22 June 1976 Friendly	Peru	3–1	(Peru) Alfonso Ugarte-Cienciano	Cusco, Peru
	Jaime 27'; Cueto 62', 88'		Muchotrigo 25'	Stadium: Estadio Garcilaso

7 July 1976 Training game	Peru A	4–2	Peru B	Lima, Peru
	Quesada; Cubillas; Sotil ?		Leturia; Neyra	Stadium: Estadio Nacional

21 July 1976 Friendly	Deportivo Junín (Peru)	1–0	Peru	Huancayo, Peru
	Real 65'			Stadium: Estadio IV Centenario; Attendance: 7,679

28 July 1976 Friendly	Peru	1–2	(Argentina) Atlético Talleres	Lima, Peru
	Díaz	Report	Fachetti 3'; Ludueña 28' (pen.)	Stadium: Estadio Nacional; Attendance: 3,000; Referee: Hugo Barrera (Peru)

12 August 1976 Friendly	Peru	2–1	(Argentina) River Plate	Lima, Peru
	Carranza 43'; La Rosa 88'	Report	Más 77'	Stadium: Estadio Nacional; Referee: César Orozco (Peru)

19 August 1976 Friendly	Peru	0–0	(Argentina) Rosario Central	Lima, Peru
				Stadium: Estadio Nacional

25 August 1976 Friendly	Atlético Talleres (Argentina)	0–0	Peru	Córdoba, Argentina
		Report		Stadium: Estadio Francisco Cabasés; Referee: José Faseta

26 August 1976 Friendly	Independiente Rivadavia (Argentina)	2–0	Peru	Mendoza, Argentina
	Palavecino 43'; Hita 44'	Report		Stadium: Estadio Bautista Gargantini; Referee: Orlando Gonzáles

6 October 1976 Training game	Peru	5–0	(Peru) Universitario B	Lima, Peru
	Ramírez; Quesada; Velásquez

30 January 1977 Friendly	Melgar FBC (Peru)	0–4	Peru	Arequipa, Peru
		Report	Díaz; Palacios; Luces; Velásquez	Stadium: Estadio Melgar; Attendance: 7,201; Referee: César Orozco (Peru)

1977 Friendly	Peru	1–1	(Peru) Sportivo Huracán	Arequipa, Peru
	Rojas	Report

1977 Friendly	Peru	2–0	(Argentina) Lanús	Cusco, Peru

6 February 1977 Friendly	Peru	3–0	(Argentina) Lanús	Cusco, Peru

February 1977 Friendly	Independiente Santa Fe (Colombia)	1–4	Peru	Bogotá, Colombia
			Sotil ? ?	Stadium: Estadio El Campín

25 February 1977 Friendly	Peru	3–1	(Argentina) Independiente	Lima, Peru
	Chumpitaz 10'; Ramírez 35'; Sotil 70'	Report	Larrosa 21'	Stadium: Estadio Nacional

1977 Friendly	Peru	0–0	(Argentina) Newell's Old Boys	Lima, Peru
		Report

1977 Friendly	CS Herediano (Costa Rica)	2–2	Peru	Costa Rica

1977 Friendly	Atlético Nacional (Colombia)	2–3	Peru	Colombia
			Oblitas; Ramírez; Quesada

26 June 1977 Friendly	Peru	0–0	(Argentina) River Plate	Lima, Peru
		Report		Stadium: Estadio Nacional

5 July 1977 Friendly	Peru	2–2	(Argentina) Independiente	Lima, Peru
	Sotil 20'; Cubillas 23' (pen.)	Report	Outes; Brítez	Stadium: Estadio Nacional

1977 Friendly	Peru	4–2	(Argentina) Vélez Sarsfield	Lima, Peru
		Report		Stadium: Estadio Nacional

1977 Friendly	Peru	2–1	(Argentina) Huracán	Lima, Peru
		Report

1977 Friendly	Peru	1–1	(Peru) Melgar FBC	Arequipa, Peru
		Report

1 March 1978 Friendly	Peru	1–0	(Argentina) San Lorenzo	Lima, Peru
	Cubillas 51'	Report		Stadium: Estadio Nacional; Attendance: 30,000

7 March 1978 Friendly	Peru	0–2	(Argentina) Rosario Central	Lima, Peru
		Report	Bóveda 74'; Gómez 88'	Stadium: Estadio Nacional; Referee: Pedro Reyes (Peru)

10 March 1978 Friendly	Peru	2–2	(Argentina) Chacarita Juniors	Lima, Peru
	Mosquera 59'; Cubillas 82'	Report	Villazanti 7'; Ischia 80'	Stadium: Estadio Nacional

14 March 1978 Friendly	Peru	2–0	(Argentina) Newell's Old Boys	Lima, Peru
	Cubillas	Report		Stadium: Estadio Nacional

16 April 1978 Friendly	Portuguesa F.C. (Venezuela)	2–0	Peru	Caracas, Venezuela
				Stadium: Estadio Olímpico

8 May 1978 Friendly	Peru	3–1	(Argentina) Independiente	Lima, Peru
	Rojas 9'; Cubillas 34'; La Rosa 75'	Report	Outes 81'	Stadium: Estadio Nacional

19 May 1978 Friendly	Peru	6–0	(Uruguay) Danubio F.C.	Lima, Peru
	Cubillas; La Rosa 27'; Muñante; Sotil; Rojas			Stadium: Estadio Nacional

3 May 1979 Friendly	Peru	3–1	(Peru) Alianza Lima	Lima, Peru
		Report	Illescas	Stadium: Estadio Nacional

20 June 1979 Friendly	Peru	2–2	(Argentina) Quilmes	Lima, Peru
	Ravello; Uribe		Andreuchi; Filardo	Stadium: Estadio Nacional; Referee: Pedro Reyes (Peru)

4 July 1979 Friendly	Peru	2–2	(Argentina) Argentinos Juniors	Lima, Peru
	Leguía 50'; Minutti 61' (o.g.)	Report	Maradona 39'; Moreno	Stadium: Estadio Nacional; Attendance: 15,000; Referee: Sergio Leiblinger (Peru)

1979 Friendly	Peru	1–0	(Argentina) Huracán	Lima, Peru
	Chumpitaz

1979 Friendly	Peru	3–1	(Colombia) Independiente Medellín
		Report

=== 1980s ===
15 October 1980 Friendly	Peru	3–2	(United States) New York United	Lima, Peru

30 October 1980 Friendly	Alianza Lima (Peru)	0–3	Peru	Lima, Peru
19:00 UTC−5		Report	Caballero 4', 45'; Navarro 18'	Stadium: Estadio Alianza Lima; Attendance: 1,000

November 1980 Friendly	Peru	1–0	(Peru) Deportivo Municipal	Lima, Peru
		Report		Stadium: Estadio Alianza Lima; Attendance: 185

27 November 1980 Friendly	Hong Kong League XI	2–1	Peru	Hong Kong
	Poole; Yip Chee Keong	Report	Uribe (pen.)	Stadium: Government Stadium; Attendance: 10,000

30 November 1980 Friendly	Caroline Hill (Hong Kong)	0–2	Peru	Hong Kong
		Report	Mosquera 21'; Uribe 86' (pen.)	Stadium: South China Stadium; Attendance: 8,000

December 1980 Friendly	Tigres UANL (Mexico)	0–1	Peru	Monterrey, Mexico
		Report

7 April 1981 Friendly	Peru	0–1	(Canada) Montreal Manic	Lima, Peru
		Report

17 May 1981 Friendly	Peru	1–3	(Spain) Real Betis	Lima, Peru
	Uribe	Report	Segundo; Alex; Cardeñosa	Stadium: Estadio Nacional; Referee: Pedro Reyes (Peru)

24 May 1981 Friendly	Peru	1–0	(Spain) RCD Espanyol	Lima, Peru
	Uribe 67'	Report		Stadium: Estadio Nacional; Referee: Sergio Leiblinger (Peru)

3 June 1981 Friendly	Peru	2–2	(Argentina) Talleres de Córdoba	Lima, Peru
	Díaz; Ravello	Report		Stadium: Estadio Nacional

7 June 1981 Friendly	Peru	2–2	(Argentina) Platense	Lima, Peru
	Uribe	Report	Scotto; López	Stadium: Estadio Nacional

1981 Friendly	Peru	1–2	(England) Birmingham City	Lima, Peru
	Uribe	Report	Bertschin ?	Stadium: Estadio Nacional

1981 Friendly	Peru	0–0	(Chile) Universidad Católica	Lima, Peru
		Report		Stadium: Estadio Nacional

24 June 1981 Friendly	Peru	2–1	(Brazil) Bangu	Lima, Peru
	Ravello; Correa	Report	Feijão	Stadium: Estadio Nacional

1981 Friendly	Peru	3–1	(Argentina) Newell's Old Boys	Lima, Peru
	Uribe; Oblitas; Barbadillo	Report		Stadium: Estadio Nacional

1981 Friendly	Peru	0–0	(Bolivia) Jorge Wilstermann	Peru
		Report

18 July 1981 Friendly	Peru	0–0	(Bolivia) The Strongest	Arequipa, Peru
		Report

1981 Friendly	Peru	2–1	(Argentina) Racing Club	Lima, Peru
	La Rosa; Uribe (pen.)	Report	Leroyer	Stadium: Estadio Nacional; Referee: Carlos Montalbán (Peru)

30 August 1981 Friendly	Peru	2–2	(Brazil) Cruzeiro EC	Lima, Peru
	Uribe 8' (pen.), 76' (pen.)	Report	Edmar 24'; Bacharel 71'	Stadium: Estadio Nacional; Referee: Pedro Reyes (Peru)

13 February 1982 Friendly	Peru	2–1	(Brazil) SE Palmeiras	Lima, Peru
	Leguía 5'; Uribe 29'	Report	Célio 57'	Stadium: Estadio Nacional; Referee: Carlos Montalbán (Peru)

1982 Friendly	Peru	1–0	(Argentina) Racing Club	Lima, Peru

16 March 1982 Friendly	Peru	2–0	(Germany) Borussia Dortmund	Lima, Peru
	Uribe; La Rosa	Report

19 March 1982 Friendly	Atlético Nacional (Colombia)	1–1	Peru	Medellín, Colombia
		Report	Navarro

4 April 1982 Friendly	New York Cosmos (United States)	5–1	Peru	East Rutherford, United States
	Romerito 22', 59'; Chinaglia 33', 45+1'; Moyers	Report	Uribe 27' (pen.)	Stadium: Giants Stadium; Attendance: 37,408; Referee: Angelo Bratsis (United States)

7 April 1982 Friendly	ACF Fiorentina (Italy)	0–1	Peru	Florence, Italy
		Report	Leguía	Stadium: Stadio Comunale; Attendance: 23,000

14 April 1982 Friendly	Inter Milan-AC Milan (Italy)	0–2	Peru	Milan, Italy
20:45 UTC+1		Report	Leguía 4'; Malásquez 44'	Stadium: San Siro; Attendance: 25,000; Referee: Luigi Agnolin (Italy)

22 April 1982 Friendly	Deportivo de La Coruña (Spain)	1–1	Peru	A Coruña, Spain
		Report	Uribe	Stadium: Estadio Riazor

30 April 1982 Friendly	RFC sérésien (Belgium)	2–1	Peru	Seraing, Belgium
	Claesen; Olaechea (o.g.)	Report	Malásquez

11 May 1982 Friendly	Peru	0–0	(Brazil) Grêmio	Lima, Peru
		Report		Stadium: Estadio Nacional; Referee: César Pagano (Peru)

20 May 1982 Friendly	Peru	2–1	(Belgium) Racing White	Lima, Peru
	Uribe; Velásquez	Report	Espósito

25 May 1982 Friendly	Peru	1–0	(Peru) CNI (Iquitos)	Lima, Peru
		Report

26 May 1982 Friendly	Peru	3–1	(France) Paris Saint-Germain	Lima, Peru
	Col 45' (o.g.); Uribe 61' (pen.); Cubillas 76'	Report	Bathenay 64'	Stadium: Estadio Nacional; Attendance: 29,855; Referee: Edison Pérez (Peru)

15 February 1984 Friendly	Alianza Lima (Peru)	1–1	Peru	Lima, Peru
	Mejía	Report	Suárez	Stadium: Estadio Alianza Lima; Attendance: 15,000; Referee: César Cachay (Peru)

14 June 1984 Friendly	Peru	1–4	(Argentina) Argentinos Juniors	Lima, Peru
	Suárez	Report

28 June 1984 Friendly	Peru	1–0	(Uruguay) Peñarol	Lima, Peru
	Uribe	Report		Stadium: Estadio Nacional; Attendance: 35,000; Referee: Edison Pérez (Peru)

1 July 1984 Friendly	Peru	3–1	(Argentina) Estudiantes LP	Lima, Peru
	García; Caballero; Suárez	Report

13 July 1984 Friendly	Peru	3–0	(Argentina) Independiente	Lima, Peru
	Caballero	Report

13 March 1985 Friendly	Peru	2–2	(Uruguay) Nacional	Lima, Peru
	Velásquez	Report

3 April 1985 Friendly	Peru	1–1	(Brazil) SE Palmeiras	Lima, Peru
	Navarro 51'	Report	Hélio 35'	Stadium: Estadio Nacional; Referee: Henrique Lappo (Peru)

17 April 1985 Friendly	Peru	2–0	(Chile) Colo-Colo	Lima, Peru
	Navarro 9'; Díaz 29'	Report		Stadium: Estadio Nacional; Attendance: 3,476; Referee: Carlos Montalbán (Peru)

5 May 1985 Friendly	Peru	2–2	(Brazil) Grêmio	Arequipa, Peru
	Uribe; Navarro	Report

9 May 1985 Friendly	Peru	0–0	(Brazil) Grêmio	Lima, Peru
		Report		Stadium: Estadio Nacional; Attendance: 20,413; Referee: José Ramírez (Peru)

3 October 1985 Friendly	Peru	2–3	(Argentina) River Plate	Lima, Peru
	La Rosa 73'; Hirano 77'	Report	Ruggeri 8'; Gorosito 10', 71'	Stadium: Estadio Nacional

10 October 1985 Friendly	Peru	0–0	(Brazil) Santos FC	Lima, Peru
		Report

1985 Friendly	Peru	2–1	(Bolivia) Jorge Wilstermann	Arequipa, Peru
		Report

1985 Friendly	Peru	2–0	(Bolivia) Club Bolívar	Arequipa, Peru
		Report

19 January 1986 Nehru Cup	Peru	0–1	East Germany Olympic	Trivandrum, India
		Report	Raab 80'

23 January 1986 Nehru Cup	Peru	2–1	South Korea XI	Trivandrum, India
	Martínez 43'; Navarro 48'	Report	Choi Gae-Hyuk 2'

26 January 1986 Nehru Cup	Peru	0–2	Soviet Union B	Trivandrum, India
		Report	Yevtushenko 10'; Lyutyi 71'

17 June 1987 Friendly	Peru	2–2	(Peru) Carlos A. Mannucci	Trujillo, Peru
	Malásquez 7'; Hirano 25'	Report	Pereyra 55'; Valdez 78'	Stadium: Estadio Mansiche; Attendance: 9,336; Referee: Alfonso Postigo (Peru)

26 March 1988 Friendly	Peru	1–3	Canada	Lima, Peru
18:00 UTC−5	Neyra	Report	Hooper 61'; De Santis; Catliff 73'	Stadium: Estadio Nacional; Attendance: 45,000

5 February 1989 Copa Centenario de Armenia	Colombia U20	1–1	Peru	Armenia, Colombia
	Osorio 60'	Report	Cordero 12'	Stadium: Estadio Centenario; Referee: Armando Pérez (Colombia)

2 June 1989 Marlboro Cup	América de Cali (Colombia)	1–2	Peru	East Rutherford, United States
	Santín 89'	Report	Rey Muñoz 36', 88'	Stadium: Giants Stadium

13 June 1989 Friendly	Peru	0–0	(Ecuador) S.D. Aucas	Lima, Peru
19:00 UTC−5		Report		Stadium: Estadio Nacional; Attendance: 2,000

=== 1990s ===
19 May 1991 Friendly	Peru	3–2	(Peru) Trujillo XI	Trujillo, Peru
	Olivares 16'; Martínez 58'; Aguirre 79'	Report	Paredes 38'; Mendoza 84'	Stadium: Estadio Mansiche; Attendance: 8,319; Referee: César Cachay (Peru)

23 May 1991 Friendly	Peru	0–0	(Peru) Alianza Atlético	Sullana, Peru
				Stadium: Estadio Campeones del 36

26 May 1991 Friendly	Peru	4–1	(Peru) FBC Melgar	Lima, Peru
				Stadium: Estadio Nacional

1991 Friendly	Peru	2–2	Legión extranjera	Lima, Peru
	Ortega (o.g.); Cordero (pen.)		Baldessari; Lula	Stadium: Estadio Nacional; Attendance: 16,457; Referee: César Cachay (Peru)

11 December 1992 Friendly	Peru	2–0	(Argentina) Argentinos Juniors	Lima, Peru
	Charún 70'; Ramírez 79'	Report		Stadium: Estadio Alianza Lima; Referee: Carlos Mansilla (Peru)

18 December 1992 Friendly	Peru	2–1	(Colombia) Independiente Medellín	Lima, Peru
	Soto 47' (pen.), 63'	Report	Gómez 36'	Stadium: Estadio Nacional; Referee: Luis Seminario (Peru)

1993 Friendly	Peru	4–0	(Paraguay) Club Olimpia	Lima, Peru
	Olivares; Rivera; Valencia	Report

17 July 1996 Friendly	Peru	1–0	(Brazil) Fluminense FC	Lima, Peru
	Reynoso	Report		Stadium: Estadio Nacional

1996 Friendly	FBC Melgar (Peru)	0–2	Peru	Arequipa, Peru
		Report

1996 Friendly	Cienciano (Peru)	1–5	Peru	Cusco, Peru
		Report	Maldonado; Palacios; Farfán; Carty; Solano

2 October 1996 Friendly	Peru	1–1	(Peru) ADFP XI	Peru
	Julinho		Czornomaz (pen.)

4 June 1997 Friendly	Peru	0–1	(Bolivia) The Strongest	Cusco, Peru
		Report	Céspedes

1997 Friendly	Peru	1–1	(Peru) Cienciano	Cusco, Peru
		Report

=== 2000s ===
27 December 2006 Friendly	Valencian Community	3–1	Peru	Elche, Spain
13:00 UTC−5	Natalio 52'; Parri 53'; Redondo 76'	Report	Vassallo 10'	Stadium: Estadio Martínez Valero; Attendance: 5,000; Referee: Vicente Lizondo Cortés (Spain)

27 December 2008 Friendly	Extremadura	2–2	Peru	Cáceres, Spain
11:00 UTC−5	Rai 70', 96' (pen.)	Report	Ross 25'; García 75'	Stadium: Estadio Príncipe Felipe; Attendance: 2,500; Referee: Andrés Cevallos Silva (Spain)

=== 2010s ===
6 April 2011 Friendly	Cienciano (Peru)	2–1	Peru	Cusco, Peru
	Ibarra	Report	Guevara (pen.)	Stadium: Estadio Garcilaso

6 April 2011 Friendly	Cienciano (Peru)	1–6	Peru	Cusco, Peru
	Caballero	Report	Lobatón; Ávila; Cueva	Stadium: Estadio Garcilaso

28 June 2011 Friendly	Peru	1–0	Senegal B	Lima, Peru
20:00 UTC−5	Guerrero 89'	Report		Stadium: Estadio Alejandro Villanueva; Referee: Leandro Vuaden (Brazil)

10 November 2011 45-minute Training game	FBC Melgar (Peru)	0–2	Peru	Arequipa, Peru
14:30 UTC−5		Report	Yotún; Ávila	Stadium: Estadio Monumental

10 November 2011 Friendly	FBC Melgar (Peru)	1–2	Peru	Arequipa, Peru
15:30 UTC−5	Ojeda	Report	Guerrero 13', 25'	Stadium: Estadio Monumental; Attendance: 35,000

6 October 2012 Friendly	Cienciano (Peru)	0–5	Peru	Cusco, Peru
15:30 UTC−5		Report	Cueva 13'; Ramos 35'; Pando 45'; Mariño 49'; Ávila 90'	Stadium: Estadio Garcilaso

8 October 2012 Friendly	Real Garcilaso (Peru)	0–4	Peru	Cusco, Peru
		Report	Ávila; Cominges; Cueva; Guevara	Stadium: Estadio Garcilaso

28 December 2013 Friendly	Basque Country	6–0	Peru	Bilbao, Spain
14:45 UTC−5	Aduriz 12', 40'; Torres 22'; Agirretxe 48', 52'; Susaeta 80'	Report		Stadium: Estadio San Mamés; Attendance: 27,000; Referee: Carlos Delgado Ferreiro (Spain)

1 October 2016 Training game	Peru	1–0	Peru U20	Lima, Peru
	Sánchez	Report		Stadium: VIDENA

6 November 2019 60-minute Training game	Peru	0–2	Peru U23	Lima, Peru
		Report	Olivares	Stadium: VIDENA

=== 2020s ===
4 September 2020 Training game	Peru	1–0	Peru U20	Lima, Peru
	Corzo	Report		Stadium: VIDENA

12 January 2022 Friendly	Peru	2–0	(Peru) Liga 1 All Stars	Lima, Peru
	López 43'; Polo 77'	Report		Stadium: VIDENA

25 May 2022 60-minute Training game	Peru	3–1	(Peru) Alianza Lima U18	Lima, Peru
	Guerrero; Aquino; Valera	Report		Stadium: VIDENA

28 May 2022 Training game	Peru	7–0	(Peru) Universitario B	Lima, Peru
	Guerrero; Gonzáles; Corzo; Ormeño; Concha	Report		Stadium: VIDENA

6 June 2022 70-minute Training game	Sabadell FC U20 (Spain)	1–0	Peru	Barcelona, Spain
	Fernández	Report		Stadium: CAR Sant Cugat

14 November 2025 75-minute Training game	PFC Sochi (Russia)	5–1	Peru	Sochi, Russia
	Zinkovsky; Kramarič; Bart; Korneyev; Gruber (o.g.)	Report	Andrealli	Stadium: Fisht Olympic Stadium

21 December 2025 Unofficial friendly	Peru	2–0	Bolivia	Chincha Alta, Peru
15:30 UTC−5	Magallanes 87'; Soyer 89'	Report		Stadium: Estadio Félix Castillo Tardío; Attendance: 2,000; Referee: Bruno Pérez (Peru)

=== Bolivarian Games ===
Between 1947 and 1981, the Bolivarian Games matches were played by amateur teams. However, in the 1947-48 edition, only Peru sent an amateur team; Bolivia and Venezuela – the other participants – played with their A team.

3 January 1948 1947–1948 Bolivarian Games	Peru XI	1–0	Venezuela	Lima, Peru
12:00 UTC−5	Díaz	Report		Stadium: Estadio Nacional

8 January 1948 1947–1948 Bolivarian Games	Peru XI	1–0	Bolivia	Lima, Peru
	Díaz	Report		Stadium: Estadio Nacional; Referee: Waldemar Silva

6 December 1951 1951 Bolivarian Games	Peru XI	0–1	Colombia XI	Caracas, Venezuela
		Report	Mendoza	Stadium: Estadio Olímpico

9 December 1951 1951 Bolivarian Games	Venezuela XI	2–2	Peru XI	Caracas, Venezuela
		Report		Stadium: Estadio Olímpico

12 December 1951 1951 Bolivarian Games	Peru XI	2–1	Panama XI	Caracas, Venezuela
	Ampuero; Villafuerte	Report	Arana	Stadium: Estadio Olímpico

21 December 1951 1951 Bolivarian Games	Peru XI	2–0	Ecuador XI	Caracas, Venezuela
		Report		Stadium: Estadio Olímpico

4 December 1961 1961 Bolivarian Games	Colombia XI	2–3	Peru XI	Barranquilla, Colombia
	de la Peña; Pérez	Report	Salguero; García	Stadium: Estadio Olímpico Municipal

6 December 1961 1961 Bolivarian Games	Peru XI	2–1	Venezuela XI	Barranquilla, Colombia
		Report		Stadium: Estadio Olímpico Municipal

8 December 1961 1961 Bolivarian Games	Peru XI	3–2	Panama XI	Barranquilla, Colombia
	Delgado; García	Report	Ponce; Santamaría	Stadium: Estadio Olímpico Municipal

10 December 1961 1961 Bolivarian Games	Peru XI	1–0	Venezuela XI	Barranquilla, Colombia
		Report		Stadium: Estadio Olímpico Municipal

12 December 1961 1961 Bolivarian Games	Colombia XI	0–2	Peru XI	Barranquilla, Colombia
		Report	García	Stadium: Estadio Olímpico Municipal

14 December 1961 1961 Bolivarian Games	Peru XI	2–1	Panama XI	Barranquilla, Colombia
	Suárez; Segura	Report	Sánchez	Stadium: Estadio Olímpico Municipal

18 February 1973 1973 Bolivarian Games	Peru XI	0–0	Colombia XI	Panama City, Panama
		Report

21 February 1973 1973 Bolivarian Games	Peru XI	6–2	Bolivia XI	Panama City, Panama
	La Rosa; Celi; Ravello	Report

23 February 1973 1973 Bolivarian Games	Panama XI	0–4	Peru XI	Panama City, Panama
		Report	Ravello; La Rosa

25 February 1973 1973 Bolivarian Games	Peru XI	1–0	Colombia XI	Panama City, Panama
	De Souza	Report

February 1973 1973 Bolivarian Games	Peru XI	6–0	Bolivia XI	Panama City, Panama
	La Rosa ?	Report

2 March 1973 1973 Bolivarian Games	Panama XI	1–0	Peru XI	Panama City, Panama
	Jaime E. Hugues	Report

October 1977 1977 Bolivarian Games	Peru XI	1–2	Venezuela XI	La Paz, Bolivia
		Report		Stadium: Estadio Hernando Siles

October 1977 1977 Bolivarian Games	Bolivia XI	0–0	Peru XI	La Paz, Bolivia
		Report		Stadium: Estadio Hernando Siles

19 October 1977 1977 Bolivarian Games	Peru XI	2–2	Venezuela XI	La Paz, Bolivia
16:00 UTC−4		Report		Stadium: Estadio Hernando Siles

October 1977 1977 Bolivarian Games	Bolivia XI	1–0	Peru XI	La Paz, Bolivia
		Report		Stadium: Estadio Hernando Siles

4 December 1981 1981 Bolivarian Games	Venezuela XI	1–1	Peru XI	Barquisimeto, Venezuela
16:00 UTC−4		Report		Stadium: Estadio Farid Richa

December 1981 1981 Bolivarian Games	Peru XI	3–0	Bolivia XI	Barquisimeto, Venezuela
		Report		Stadium: Estadio Farid Richa

December 1981 1981 Bolivarian Games	Peru XI	2–1	Colombia XI	Barquisimeto, Venezuela
		Report		Stadium: Estadio Farid Richa

== Notes ==
1. Team made up of the players who had won the 1936 national amateur championship.
2. The referee, Arturo Yamasaki, initially decided to send off Juan Seminario, Zaragoza's star striker, who was also Peruvian. Faced with pressure from the crowd, who opposed the expulsion, Yamasaki reconsidered his decision, and Seminario returned to the pitch. However, the second half was officiated by a different referee (Héctor Hernández).
3. Team composed of players from the Ecuadorian football league with a core of players from S.D. Aucas.
4. Team made up of players from the Arequipa region.
5. South Korea amateur team.
6. The team is made up of Algerian and Moroccan players.
7. This is the amateur team that was set to represent Peru at the 1973 Bolivarian Games, led by Alberto Terry.
8. Team made up of players from the Uruguayan football league.
9. Team made up of South American players.
10. Team made up of players from Lima.
11. Birmingham City is the only English Premier League club that the Peruvian national team has faced.
12. Héctor Chumpitaz's farewell match.
13. Match official for Canada, unofficial for Peru.
14. Selection made up of players playing in Trujillo clubs.
15. Team of Foreigners and Peruvians.
16. Team of the ADFP (Spanish acronym for Professional Footballers' Association).
17. Team made up of foreign players from the Peruvian football league.
18. The match was organized and contested by a team from SAFAP, an organization separate from the Peruvian Football Federation.
