= Félix Suárez (footballer) =

Peruvian footballer (born 1952)

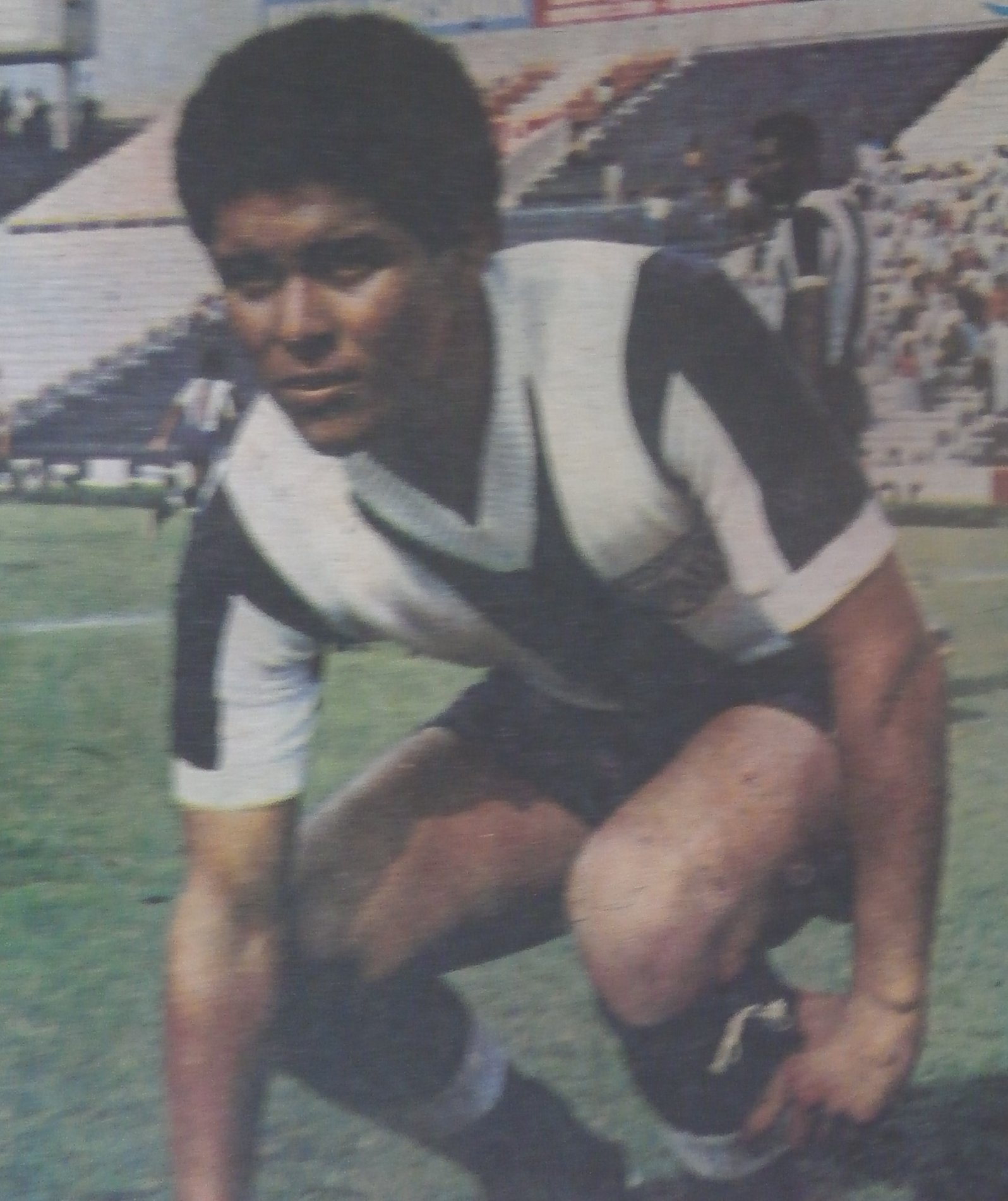
- Suárez in 1976

Personal information
- Full name: Félix Suárez Becerra
- Date of birth: 3 October 1953 (age 73)
- Place of birth: Piura, Department of Piura, Peru
- Position: Left forward

Youth career
- ???–1971: Deportivo Municipal

Senior career*
Years	Team	Apps	(Gls)
1972–1973	Atlético Grau		
1974	Deportivo Municipal		
1975	Atlético Chalaco		
1976	Alianza Lima	43	(17)
1977–1979	Atlético Chalaco		
1980–1981	Alfonso Ugarte		
1982	Atlético Torino		
1983–1984	Alianza Atlético		
1985	Santiago Barranco		
- * Club domestic league appearances and goals

Félix Suárez Becerra (born 3 October 1953) is a retired Peruvian footballer. He played as left forward for Atlético Chalaco and Alianza Lima throughout the 1970s. He is known for being the fastest goalscorer in the Copa Libertadores with his famous goal against Colombian club Independiente Santa Fe during the 1976 edition in just six seconds.

== Career ==
Suárez was born at the Castilla District within the Department of Piura before moving to the city of Piura three days later as the son of Félix Suárez Paz and Rosa Becerra Torres with his father also being a footballer who played for Atlético Grau throughout the 1950s. Alongside five other brothers and four sisters, he was the older brother of Fidel Suárez who played for Universitario de Deportes and Sporting Cristal throughout the 1980s and 1990s and José Suárez Becerra who played for Atlético Torino in the mid-1980s and played in various Aruban clubs throughout the 1990s. Throughout his school life, he began playing football at a young age and He studied at the Institución Educativa Ignacio Sánchez and the Colegio Nacional San Miguel in Piura. His talents would attract the attention of the Piura branch of Deportivo Municipal and would sign him within the youth sector. Despite this, Suárez failed to make the Starting XI for the club due being largely absent from many tryouts as he was still studying at the time and thus, decided to begin his senior career within his native city of Piura by playing for Atlético Grau, making his debut during the 1972 Torneo Descentralizado after they had just been promoted from the 1972 Copa Perú.

Despite being signed late into the season, he was already promoted to the Starting XI where he played alongside other players such as Rolando Jiménez and Manuel Mora with his uncle Manuel Suárez also already being within the starting lineup for the club under manager Pedro Valdivieso with the number 10. He would then be signed to Deportivo Municipal in 1974 where he played alongside other notable figures of the club such as César Cueto, Augusto Robles, Walter Limo, Víctor Corbacho, Luis La Fuente, Raúl Chumpitaz, Fernando Alva, Freddy Ravello, Manuel Mellán and Arturo Bisetti as he signed to the club following the departure of Hugo Sotil for Barcelona. Due to poor pay within the club, he would only stay a single season with Muni as he then signed with Atlético Chalaco in 1975 as a part of his first season with the club in nearby Callao where he played alongside players such as Manuel Lobatón, Hugo Bustamante Silva and Santiago Ojeda.

His talents would earn him a place within the starting XI of Alianza Lima for the 1976 season after being scouted by a talent agent during the final match of the 1975 Torneo Descentralizado despite Suárez being injured at the time. He also received an offer from Universitario de Deportes around the time but declined as he had already accepted the deal with the Blanquiazules as well as his friends Ojeda and Lobatón also signing with the club. Throrughout the season, the Blanquiazules had a decent performance with the club reaching fourth place as he made many goals throughout both within the domestic league and in his appearances through friendlies with Carlos Gómez Laynes being his main substitute throughout his single season with the club. His most notable contribution with the club came during the 1976 Copa Libertadores where he scored the fastest goal ever in the tournament against Independiente Santa Fe. The manner in which it occurred when his teammate Cueto passed the ball to him to which Suárez began sprinting towards the goal and catching the defense of the Cardenales completely off guard as he went on to score a second goal in the match and end the game in a 3–0 thrashing.

After spending being part of the winning squad for the 1976 Copa Simón Bolívar, he spent the remainder of the 1970s with Chalaco once more where he played alongside José "El Ñato" Herrera who was his teammate throughout his career in youth football. Due to the club also experiencing financial difficulties, the early 1980s saw him play for Alfonso Ugarte and for Atlético Torino for the 1982 Copa Perú where the club achieved promotion for the 1983 Torneo Descentralizado. He spent the next two seasons playing for Alianza Atlético and was initially supposed to sign with Octavio Espinosa for the 1984 Torneo Descentralizado but after the club refused to pay for his services, he returned to Lima. He spent his final season with Santiago Barranco where he achieved the position due to knowing club manager Fernando Cuéllar until a head injury that season would force his retirement.
