= Félix Suárez =

Félix Suárez may refer to:

- Félix Suárez (footballer) (born 1953), Peruvian footballer
- Félix Suárez (cyclist) (born 1950), Spanish cyclist
- Félix Suárez (poet) (born 1961), Mexican poet, essayist and editor
