= Teófilo Cubillas =

Peruvian footballer (born 1949)

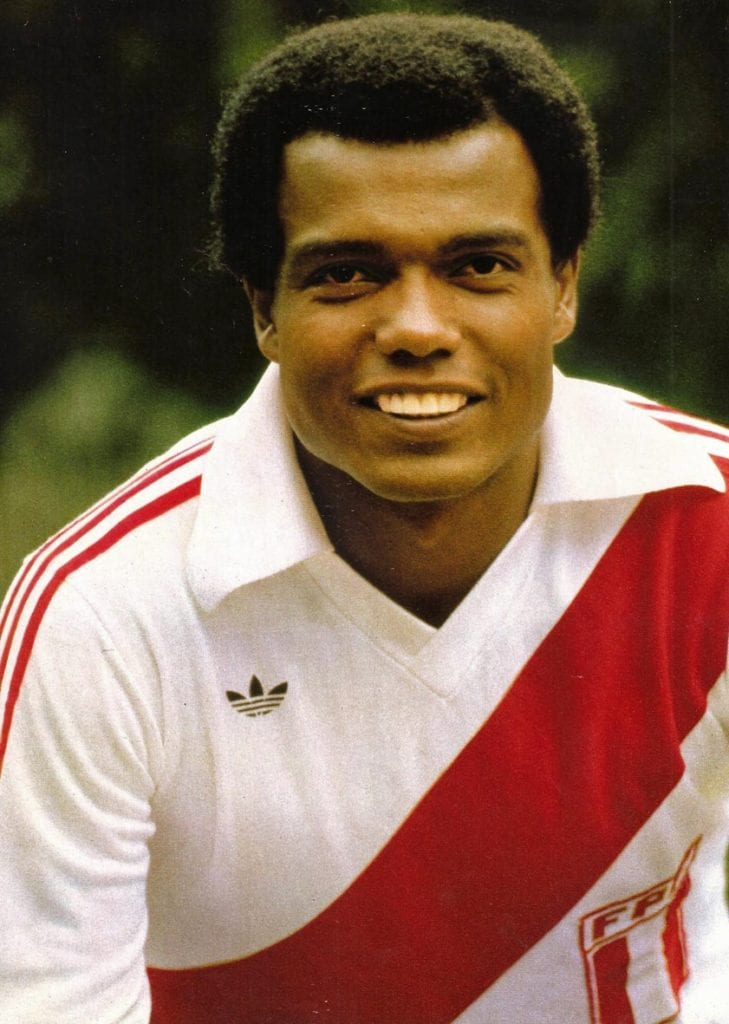
- Cubillas with the Peru national football team in 1978

Personal information
- Full name: Teófilo Juan Cubillas Arizaga
- Date of birth: 8 March 1949 (age 77)
- Place of birth: Lima, Lima Province, Peru
- Height: 1.73 m (5 ft 8 in)
- Position: Attacking midfielder

Youth career
- Alianza Lima

Senior career*
Years	Team	Apps	(Gls)
1966–1972	Alianza Lima	175	(117)
1973	Basel	10	(3)
1974–1977	Porto	85	(48)
1977–1978	Alianza Lima	47	(35)
1979–1983	Fort Lauderdale Strikers	139	(65)
1983	Fort Lauderdale Strikers (indoor)	9	(9)
1984	Alianza Lima	4	(4)
1984–1985	South Florida Sun	7	(5)
1987–1988	Alianza Lima	13	(3)
1988	Fort Lauderdale Strikers	12	(7)
1989	Miami Sharks	8	(1)
Total		506	(297)

International career
1968–1982	Peru	81	(26)

Managerial career
- 1988: Alianza Lima
Medal record
Men's football
Representing Peru
Copa América
Winner	1975
- * Club domestic league appearances and goals

Teófilo Juan Cubillas Arizaga (Spanish pronunciation: [teˈofilo kuˈβiʎas]; born 8 March 1949) is a Peruvian former footballer who played as an attacking midfielder. He is considered Peru's greatest ever player and one of the best in the history of South America. In an IFFHS poll he was selected as the best Peruvian player in history and was also included in the world's Top 50 of the 20th century. At the 1970 FIFA World Cup, Pelé acknowledged Cubillas, referring to him as his successor. Cubillas was renowned for his technique, shooting ability and free kick ability.

Beginning at Alianza Lima, he was nicknamed El Nene (The Kid), and was part of the Peru national team that won the 1975 Copa América. He helped Peru reach the quarter finals at the 1970 FIFA World Cup and again at the 1978 World Cup, along with qualifying for the 1982 World Cup. He was elected the South American Footballer of the Year in 1972. At a club level, he is the second all time highest goalscorer of Alianza Lima with 165 and the top goalscorer of the Fort Lauderdale Strikers with 65. For the national team, he is the third all time goalscorer with 26 goals in 81 appearances. He is also the joint 10th all time goalscorer of the FIFA World Cup with 10 goals in 13 matches.

In 2004, Pelé selected Cubillas as one of the FIFA 100, a list of 125 footballing greats. In February 2008, to celebrate the 50th anniversary of the first Brazilian World Cup victory, he was selected in the All-Star First Team of South America of the past 50 years. Cubillas is one of only six players to score five or more goals in two different World Cups, the others being Miroslav Klose, Thomas Müller, Lionel Messi, Harry Kane and Kylian Mbappé. His free-kick against Scotland in 1978 is renowned as one of the best goals scored at the World Cup.

== Club career ==
=== Early career ===
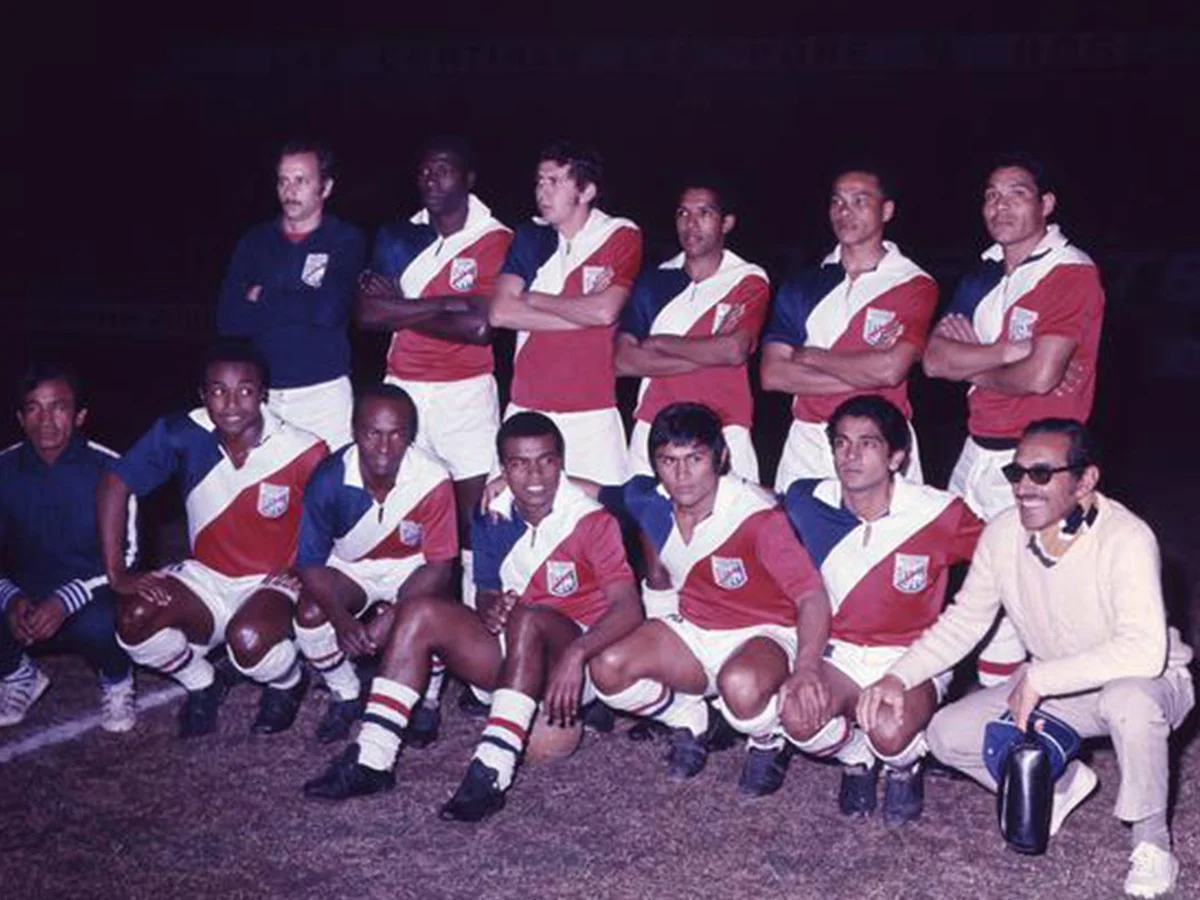
Combined team Alianza Municipal in 1971

Nicknamed "Nene" (the kid) for his boyish looks, Cubillas began his career with Alianza Lima at the age of 16 in 1966. While at Alianza, he was top scorer in the Peruvian Primera División in 1966 and 1970.

Cubillas won the youth tournaments of 1965 and 1966. He made his debut at the age of 17 in the Peruvian Primera División with Alianza Lima. In his first season, he was the tournament's top scorer with 19 goals. In the summer of 1967, Cubillas, aged 18, made his international debut in a friendly match and scored a double in a 6-1 win over Independiente of Argentina.

Directors of Deportivo Municipal and Alianza Lima formed a team in 1971 to play a series of friendly matches with the aim of bringing together Teófilo Cubillas with Hugo Sotil, another great star of the time, known as the Golden Pair, which left historic scorelines such as the victory over Benfica and the 4-1 thrashing of Bayern Munich.

In 1972, Cubillas had one of his most successful season in several years. He was the 1972 Copa Libertadores top scorer and elected South American Footballer of the Year.

=== Basel ===
In the summer of 1973, Cubillas transferred to Swiss football club FC Basel under head coach Helmut Benthaus. The Basler entrepreneur and transport company owner Ruedi Reisdorfer paid the transfer fee of £97,000. After playing in four Cup of the Alps games, Cubillas played his Swiss league debut for the club on 18 August in the away game against Chênois. He scored his first goal for the club in the same game as Basel won 1–0. Cubillas scored two goals for Basel in the 1973–74 European Cup, the first of which in the 1st leg against Fram on 19 September 1973 and the second in the return leg on 20 September. He only remained at the club for six months, where Cubillas played a total of 21 games for Basel scoring a total of 8 goals.

FC Porto, Sporting CP, FC Barcelona, AC Milan and Real Madrid took interest in Cubillas. But Basel was not willing to let the footballer go so soon. In December 1973, the Portuguese from Porto announced that they could raise enough money for the transfer, a commercial strategy that would be the last chance for Cubillas. Finally, Basel accepted and Cubillas was able to transfer to Portuguese club FC Porto for a fee of £200,000.

=== Porto ===
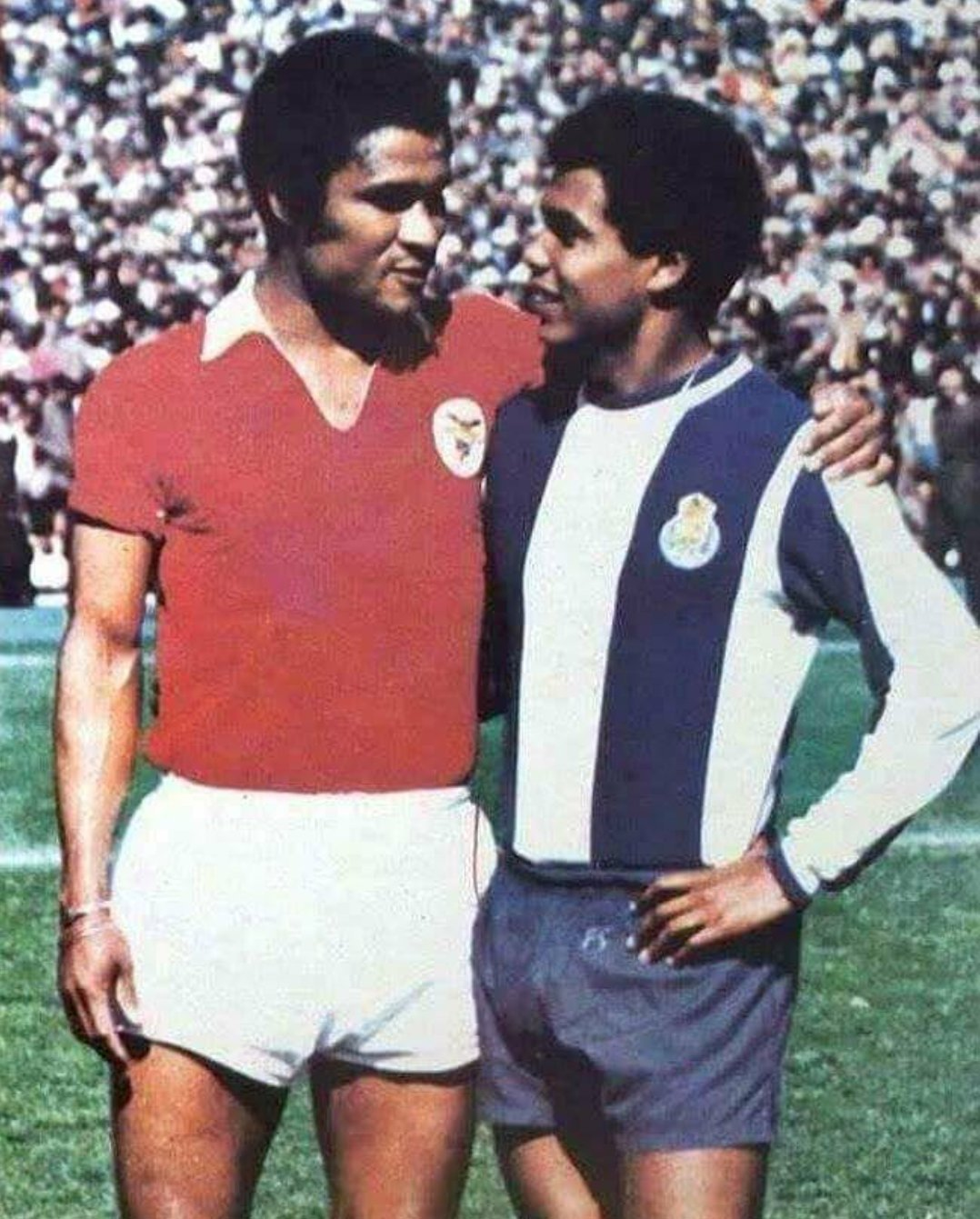
Cubillas and Eusébio in 1974

Cubilla arrived at Porto wearing the number 10 shirt. Despite not winning the league, he won the captain's armband, becoming the top scorer of Porto. He scored 66 goals in 110 games, won the Taça de Portugal and two league runner-up finishes.

Cubillas is considered the best foreign player to have played for FC Porto. Nene himself remembers that "He was the highest paid player in the country, even ahead of Eusébio, a legend of Benfica and world football."

=== Alianza Lima ===
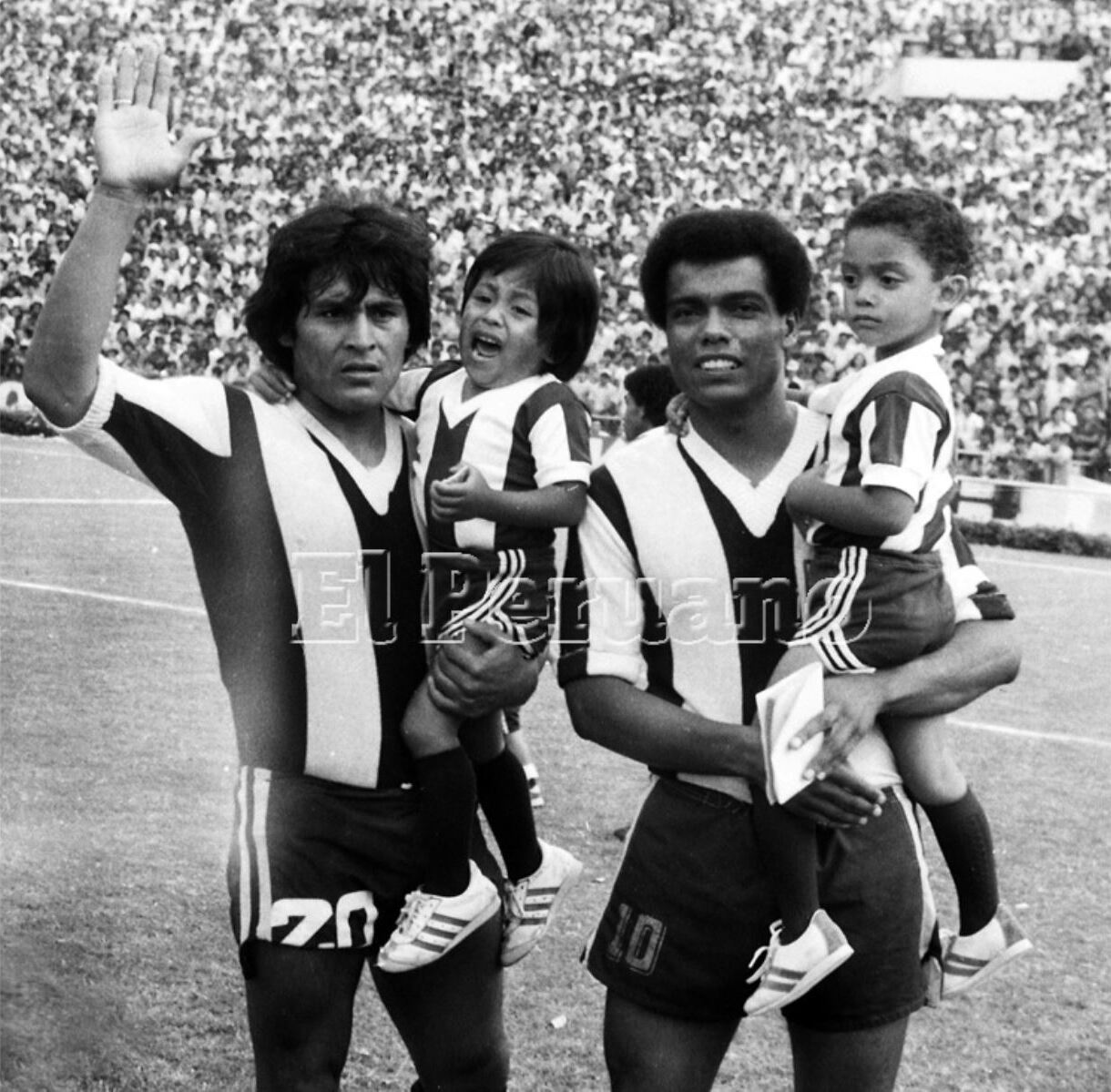
Cubillas and Sotil with Alianza in 1979

After his outstanding time in Portugal in 1977, Cubillas returned to Peru to play again for Alianza Lima. Cubillas, along with many other players such as Hugo Sotil, César Cueto, José Velásquez and other, formed one of the best Alianza Lima sides in their history.

The 1977 Torneo Descentralizado tournament was between Alianza Lima and Melgar, both teams with the only chances of lifting the championship trophy. For Melgar, the objective was to defeat Sporting Cristal and hope that Alianza Lima did not score any points against Universitario. Sporting Cristal came out defeating Melgar and Alianza Lima defeated Universitario at home 4-3 winning the 1977 tournament with Cubillas scoring two of the goals. Cubillas would win the national championship again with Alianza in 1978.

=== Fort Lauderdale Strikers ===
Cubillas with Fort Lauderdale, 1981

In 1979, Cubillas joined the NASL, signing for Fort Lauderdale Strikers, where he spent five seasons, scoring 59 league goals, including three goals in seven minutes against the Los Angeles Aztecs in 1981.

In May 1988 Cubillas returned with the newly resurrected Fort Lauderdale Strikers of the American Soccer League. The Strikers went to the ASL title game where they fell to the Washington Diplomats. Following the loss to the Diplomats, the Strikers released Cubillas.

=== Return to Alianza Lima ===
Following the December 1987 Alianza Lima air crash Cubillas returned from Miami to play for free for Alianza, who lost most of their players in the crash. He also managed the club for a period in 1988.

=== Miami Sharks ===
In March 1989, he signed with the Miami Sharks but was released on 3 July after scoring only one goal in eight games. That same year Cubillas retired at the age of 40. In June 1991 he was playing and coaching at Miramar Illusiones of the Gold Coast Soccer League in Florida.

== International career ==
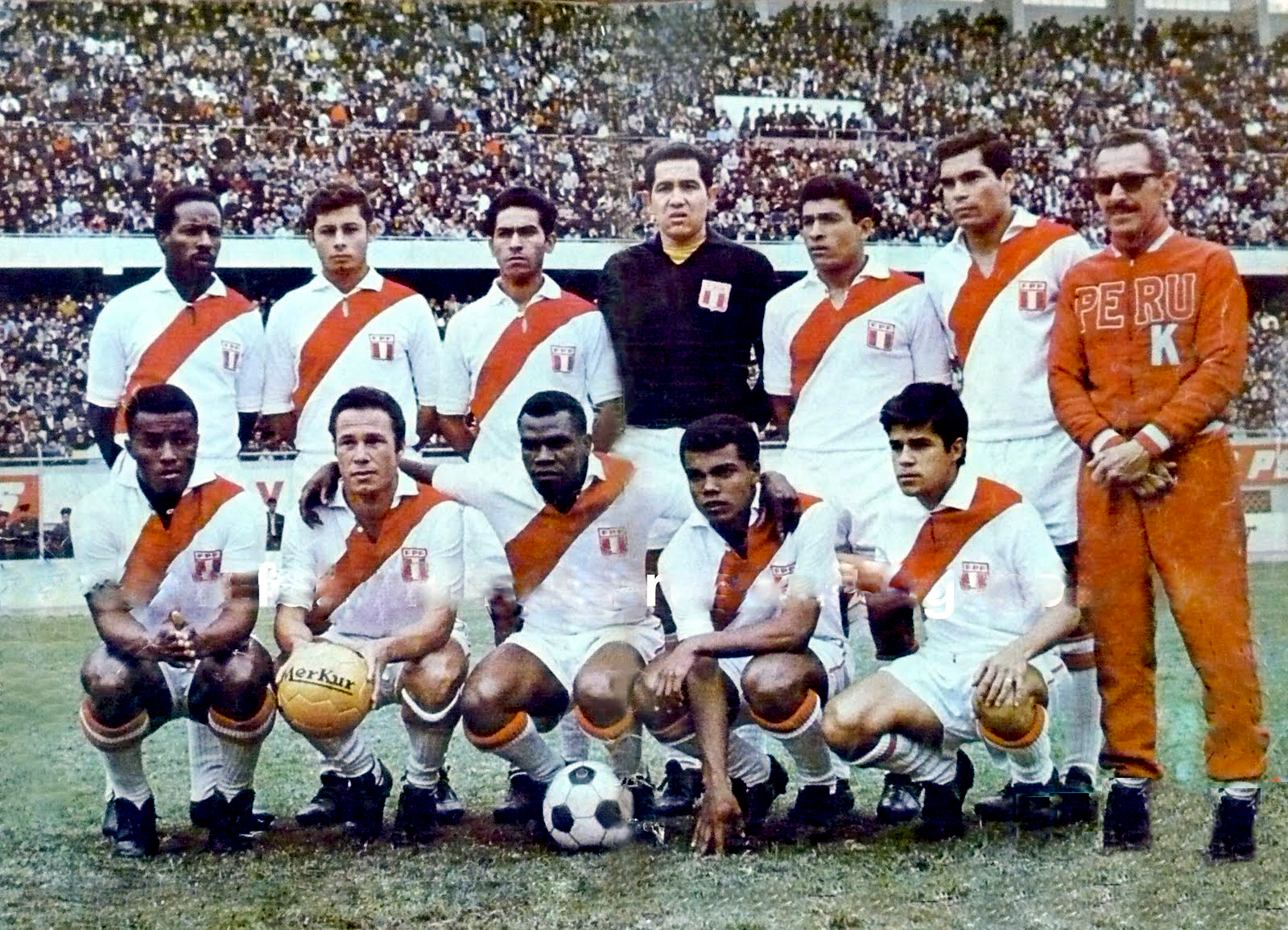
Cubillas with Peru before a match in 1968

After standing out notably in local football, he was called up to the Peru national team by head coach Didi for 1968 for the qualifiers for the 1970 FIFA World Cup held in Mexico. At just 18 years old, Cubillas made his official debut against Argentina in the qualifiers in the last round of qualifiers in 1968. In a match that will be difficult to forget for both Peruvians and Argentines, led by Cubillas, Peru started a heroic draw in 2 to 2 that took them to the World Cup and that eliminated the Argentine national team. Cubillas would score his first goal for Peru on 8 May, 1969 in a friendly against Colombia in Bogotá. Cubillas would play in three World Cups between 1970 and 1982 along with one Copa América.

=== 1970 World Cup ===
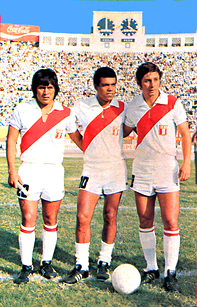
Hugo Sotil, Teófilo Cubillas and Roberto Challe (1973)

Cubillas helped the Peru national team advance to the quarter-finals of the 1970 FIFA World Cup in Mexico. He scored in all of Peru's four matches: once against Bulgaria, twice against Morocco, and once against West Germany, all in the first round. Cubillas then scored another goal in the quarter-final loss against eventual champions Brazil, and he thus finished as the third highest goal scorer in the tournament.

After winning the 1970 World Cup, Pelé who has been Cubillas's idol quoted, ''Don't worry, I already have a successor and it is Teófilo Cubillas''. Cubillas won the FIFA World Cup Young Player Award of the tournament, and was third in the Golden Shoe award.

=== 1975 Copa America ===
The Peru national team failed qualify for the 1974 FIFA World Cup in West Germany, with Cubillas missing out on the play off match against Chile. A year later however, Cubillas helped Peru win its second Copa América, winning the 1975 Copa América. Peru was placed in a group with Chile and Bolivia. After eliminating Chile and Bolivia in the first round, the country faced Brazil in the semi-finals. Cubillas scored against Brazil to reach the final against Colombia. The first match was played in Bogotá, where Peru lost 1-0. The second match was played in Lima and Peru won 2-0. However, both teams were level on points and had to play in the play-off final. Cubillas played in the play-off match in the final, where partner Hugo Sotil scored to make the game 1-0. As a result, Peru won its second continental tournament. Cubillas was the Best Player of that tournament and among his goals is the beautiful goal against Brazil in Peru's historic 3-1 victory over Brazil, played in Belo Horizonte.

=== 1978 World Cup ===
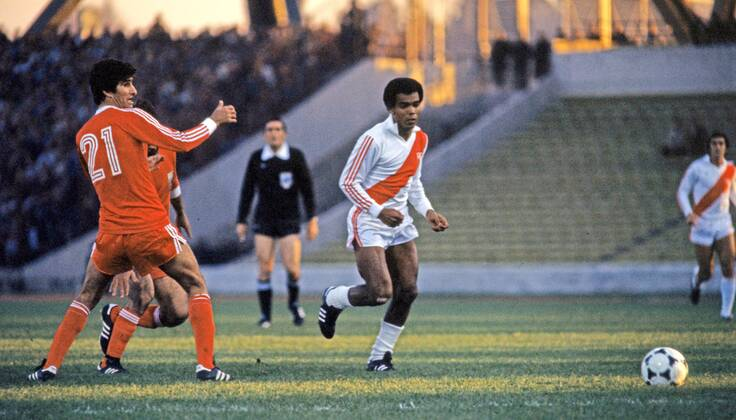
Cubillas with Peru playing against Iran at the 1978 World Cup

Cubillas played in the 1978 FIFA World Cup in Argentina, with a good start, showing his skill, finishing co-second highest goal scorer after Mario Kempes, and helping Peru win first place of its group, advancing to the second round. In the match against Scotland Cubillas scored two goals and then scored a hat-trick in the game against Iran, including two penalties. The magnificent free kick goal that Cubillas scored against Scotland with the outside edge of his boot, is today in the FIFA archives as a model of free kick execution and is considered one of the best in history. In that tournament, Peru's midfield made up of José Velásquez, César Cueto and Cubillas was considered by international critics as the best of the first phase of the World Cup.

Already in the quarterfinals, the Peruvian team dropped its level and ended up being beaten by Argentina 6-0, a result that generated controversy, because for all experts there was no football difference to give that result and this allowed Argentina to qualify for the final. Peru subsequently lost to Brazil and Poland, finishing last with zero points. Cubillas played all six of Peru's matches in the tournament and won the Silver Boot as the tournament's second top scorer and was considered part of the championship's ideal team.

=== 1982 World Cup ===
Cubillas was also in the Peru national team for 1982 FIFA World Cup. He played in all three group games but did not score any goals. After being eliminated in the first phase, Cubillas retired from the national team at the age of 33, with a total of 26 goals scored in 81 appearances.

== Career statistics ==
=== Club ===
Appearances and goals by club, season and competition
Club	Season	League			Cup		Continental		Total	
Club	Season	Division	Apps	Goals	Apps	Goals	Apps	Goals	Apps	Goals
Alianza Lima	1966	Peruvian Primera División	23	19	–					
Alianza Lima	1967	Peruvian Primera División	25	9	–		–			
Alianza Lima	1968	Peruvian Primera División	26	19	–		–			
Alianza Lima	1969	Peruvian Primera División	11	5	–		–			
Alianza Lima	1970	Peruvian Primera División	27	22	–		–			
Alianza Lima	1971	Peruvian Primera División	29	22	–		–			
Alianza Lima	1972	Peruvian Primera División	29	14	–					
Alianza Lima	Total		170	110	0	0				
FC Basel	1973	Swiss Super League	10	3				2		
Porto	1973–74	Primeira Liga	12	4	3	1	-		15	5
Porto	1974–75	Primeira Liga	30	9	6	4	4	2	40	15
Porto	1975–76	Primeira Liga	29	28	4	4	5	4	38	36
Porto	1976–77	Primeira Liga	14	7	3	2	2	1	19	10
Porto	Total		85	48	13	10	10	7	108	65
Alianza Lima	1977	Peruvian Primera División	32	23	–		–	–	32	23
Alianza Lima	1978	Peruvian Primera División	15	12	–	–	10	7	25	19
Alianza Lima	Total		47	35	0	0	10	7	57	42
Fort Lauderdale Strikers	1979	NASL (Note: Total statistics for his time in the NASL (1979–83) include playoff matches.)	30	16	—	–	–	—	32	16
Fort Lauderdale Strikers	1980	NASL	34	18	–	–	–	–	34	18
Fort Lauderdale Strikers	1981	NASL	34	19	–	–	–	–	34	19
Fort Lauderdale Strikers	1982	NASL	18	4	–	–	–	–	18	4
Fort Lauderdale Strikers	1983	NASL	23	8	–	–	–	–	23	8
Fort Lauderdale Strikers	Total		139	65	0	0	0	0	139	65
Alianza Lima	1984	Peruvian Primera División	4	4	–	–	–	–	4	4
South Florida Sun	1984	USL	5	4	–		–	–	5	4
South Florida Sun	1985	USL	2	1	–				2	1
South Florida Sun	Total		7	5	0	0	0	0	7	5
Alianza Lima	1987	Peruvian Primera División	13	3					13	3
Fort Lauderdale Strikers	1988	ASL	12	7	–	–	–	–	12	7
Career total			488	280	15	12	31	22	534	314

=== International ===
Scores and results list Peru's goal tally first, score column indicates score after each Cubillas goal.

List of international goals scored by Teófilo Cubillas
No.	Date	Venue	Opponent	Score	Result	Competition
1	8 May 1969	Bogotá, Colombia	Colombia	2–1	3–1	Friendly
2	9 July 1969	Lima, Peru	Paraguay	1–0	2–1	Friendly
3	9 July 1969	Lima, Peru	Paraguay	2–0	2–1	Friendly
4	17 August 1969	Lima, Peru	Bolivia	2–0	3–0	1970 World Cup qualifier
5	7 February 1970	Lima, Peru	Czechoslovakia	2–1	2–1	Friendly
6	9 February 1970	Lima, Peru	Romania	1–1	1–1	Friendly
7	24 February 1970	Lima, Peru	Bulgaria	1–2	5–3	Friendly
8	2 June 1970	León, Mexico	Bulgaria	3–2	3–2	1970 World Cup
9	6 June 1970	León, Mexico	Morocco	1–0	3–0	1970 World Cup
10	6 June 1970	León, Mexico	Morocco	3–0	3–0	1970 World Cup
11	10 June 1970	León, Mexico	West Germany	1–3	1–3	1970 World Cup
12	14 June 1970	Guadalajara, Mexico	Brazil	2–3	2–4	1970 World Cup
13	5 April 1972	Mexico City, Mexico	Mexico	1–1	1–2	Friendly
14	23 April 1972	Bucharest, Romania	Romania	1–1	2–2	Friendly
15	4 March 1973	Lima, Peru	Guatemala	2–0	5–1	Friendly
16	4 March 1973	Lima, Peru	Guatemala	4–1	5–1	Friendly
17	23 April 1973	Lima, Peru	Panama	3–0	4–0	Friendly
18	20 August 1975	Lima, Peru	Chile	2–0	3–1	Copa America 1975
19	30 September 1975	Belo Horizonte, Brasil	Brazil	2–0	3–1	Copa America 1975
20	17 July 1977	Cali, Colombia	Bolivia	2–0	5–0	1978 World Cup qualifier
21	17 July 1977	Cali, Colombia	Bolivia	3–0	5–0	1978 World Cup qualifier
22	3 June 1978	Córdoba, Argentina	Scotland	2–1	3–1	1978 World Cup
23	3 June 1978	Córdoba, Argentina	Scotland	3–1	3–1	1978 World Cup
24	11 June 1978	Córdoba, Argentina	Iran	2–0	4–1	1978 World Cup
25	11 June 1978	Córdoba, Argentina	Iran	3–0	4–1	1978 World Cup
26	11 June 1978	Córdoba, Argentina	Iran	4–1	4–1	1978 World Cup

== Honours ==
Basel

- Swiss Super League: 1972-73

Porto

- Taça de Portugal: 1976–77
- Primeira Liga runner-up: 1974-75

Alianza Lima

- Peruvian Primera División: 1977, 1978

Fort Lauderdale Sun

- United Soccer League: 1984, 1985

Peru

- Copa América: 1975

Individual

- Peruvian Primera División top scorer: 1966, 1970
- FIFA World Cup Best Young Player: 1970
- FIFA World Cup Bronze Boot: 1970
- Copa Libertadores top scorer: 1972
- South American Footballer of the Year: 1972
- CONMEBOL All-Star Team: 1973
- Copa America Best Player: 1975
- FIFA World Cup Silver Boot: 1978
- FIFA World Cup All-Star Team: 1978
- Eric Batty's World XI: 1978
- NASL All-Star teams, all-time: 1980, 1981
- NASL Best Midfield: 1981
- Fort Lauderdale Strikers top scorer, all time: 1984
- France Football: World Cup top 100 1930–1990: 2000
- World Soccer The 100 Greatest Footballers of All Time: 2000
- Placar The 100 Players of the Century: 2000
- Placar The 100 Players FIFA World Cup: 2000
- FIFA 100: 2004
- IFFHS' Best Players of the Century for Peru: 2006
- World – Player of the Century Nº 48: 2006
- South American – Player of the Century Nº 17: 2006
- The Best of The Best – Player of the Century Top 50: 2007
- CONMEBOL All-Star first team 1958–2008: 2008
- 3rd top scorer of the Peruvian national team: 26 goals
