= César Cueto =

Peruvian footballer (born 1952)

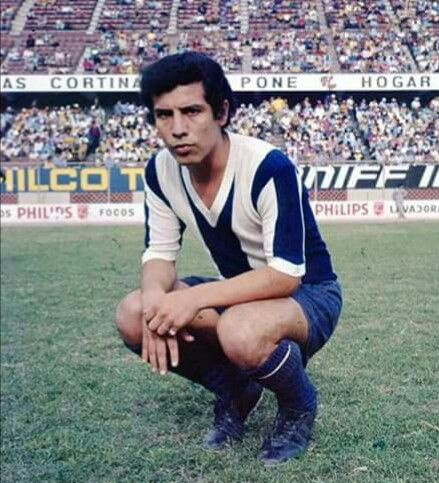

Personal information
- Full name: César Augusto Cueto Villa
- Date of birth: 16 June 1952 (age 74)
- Place of birth: Lima, Peru
- Height: 1.71 m (5 ft 7 in)
- Position: Midfielder

Senior career*
Years	Team	Apps	(Gls)
1968–1971	Alianza Lima	32	(15)
1972–1973	José Gálvez	68	(23)
1974	Deportivo Municipal	42	(29)
1975–1978	Alianza Lima	129	(79)
1979–1983	Atlético Nacional	102	(77)
1984–1985	América de Cali	34	(7)
1986	Deportivo Pereira	18	(4)
1987	Cúcuta Deportivo	11	(3)
1988–1991	Alianza Lima	131	(51)
Total		567	(288)

International career
1972–1997	Peru	51	(6)
Medal record
Men's football
Representing Peru
Copa América
Winner	1975
Bronze medal – third place	1979
Bronze medal – third place	1983
- * Club domestic league appearances and goals

César Augusto Cueto Villa (born 6 June 1952 in Lima) is a Peruvian former attacking midfielder, nicknamed "El Poeta de la zurda" (lit. 'the Poet of the Left-foot'), recognized as one of the most talented players that Peruvian soccer has produced.

He was nicknamed "El Poeta de la Zurda", because of his showy style and athletic abilities.

He played 51 times for the Peru national team between 1972 and 1985 and was part of the squad that won the Copa América 1975. He also competed for Peru at the 1978 and 1982 FIFA World Cup. One of Peru's greatest footballers, Cueto was renowned for his agility, close control and passing range.

== Biography ==
=== Club career ===
He started his professional career with a local club Alianza Lima in 1969, and between 1973 and 1974 he was on loan with the teams José Galvez and Deportivo Municipal. After Cueto's return to Alianza Lima in 1975, the club won the league titles of 1975, 1977, and 1978.

In 1979, he moved to Colombia to play for Atlético Nacional, where he became the team captain, and won the national title in 1981 with great performances. He received positive coverage and he was elected "Mustang Cup best player on the Year": 1980, 1981. He is also considered Atlético Nacional's most renowned player, and was Carlos Valderrama's favorite player and initial inspiration.

He signed with América de Cali in 1984, winning another league title that year with the club. also as captain and team leader.

After an injury in 1985, he retired from the national team but returned to play for Alianza after the 1987 air disaster; another injury struck him in 1988, forcing him away from playing. He played irregularly until his definite retirement in 1991.

=== International career ===
Also a member of the Peru national team, he earned 51 caps and scored 6 goals for Peru. He was part of the Peru squad that won the Copa America 1975 and represented it in the World Cups of 1978 – scoring in the opening match against Scotland – and 1982.

Cueto was part of the Peru team which eliminated Colombia and Uruguay in the World Cup Qualifiers in 1981. Peru won in the South American qualifying group B. In 1982, the Peru National team then toured North America and Europe. After losing to New York Cosmos, it went on to defeat Inter Milan and both the Hungary and France national teams. Cueto is best remembered for his great performance in the match against France of Platini on 28 April 1982 in Paris, which the France press acclaimed Peru national team as "one of the best teams in the world". Coming into the 1982 FIFA World Cup, there were high expectations for Peru as a dark horse favorite to win the cup with a team that included such notable players as Julio César Uribe, José Velásquez, Teófilo Cubillas and Cueto. With 2 draws and 1 defeat, Peru finished at the bottom of their group went out in the first round. Cueto himself had a disappointing tournament, Peru failed to advance to the next round, despite having an excellent team.

Also noteworthy was his strong appearance in the World Cup qualifying match against the Argentina in Buenos Aires in 1985. He contributed a scintillating pass to Geronimo Barbadillo for go-ahead goal (the game ended in a tie).

=== Participation in the World Cup ===
World	Seat	Result
1978 FIFA World Cup	Argentina	Seventh Place
1982 FIFA World Cup	Spain	1º Round

=== Personal life ===
Cueto is a practising Roman Catholic. He is divorced, has four daughters and four grandchildren. Now Cesar Cueto, belongs to the Neocatechumenal Way, is a catechist in the northern part of Peru.

== Honours ==
Season	Team	Title
1975	Peru national football team	Copa América
1975	Alianza Lima	Peruvian League
1976	Alianza Lima	Copa Simón Bolívar
1977	Alianza Lima	Peruvian League
1978	Alianza Lima	Peruvian League
1981	Atlético Nacional	Colombian League
1984	América de Cali	Colombian League

=== Individual awards ===
- Colombian League Best player on the year (2): 1980, 1981
