= Estadio Farid Richa =

Estadio de Fútbol Farid Richa
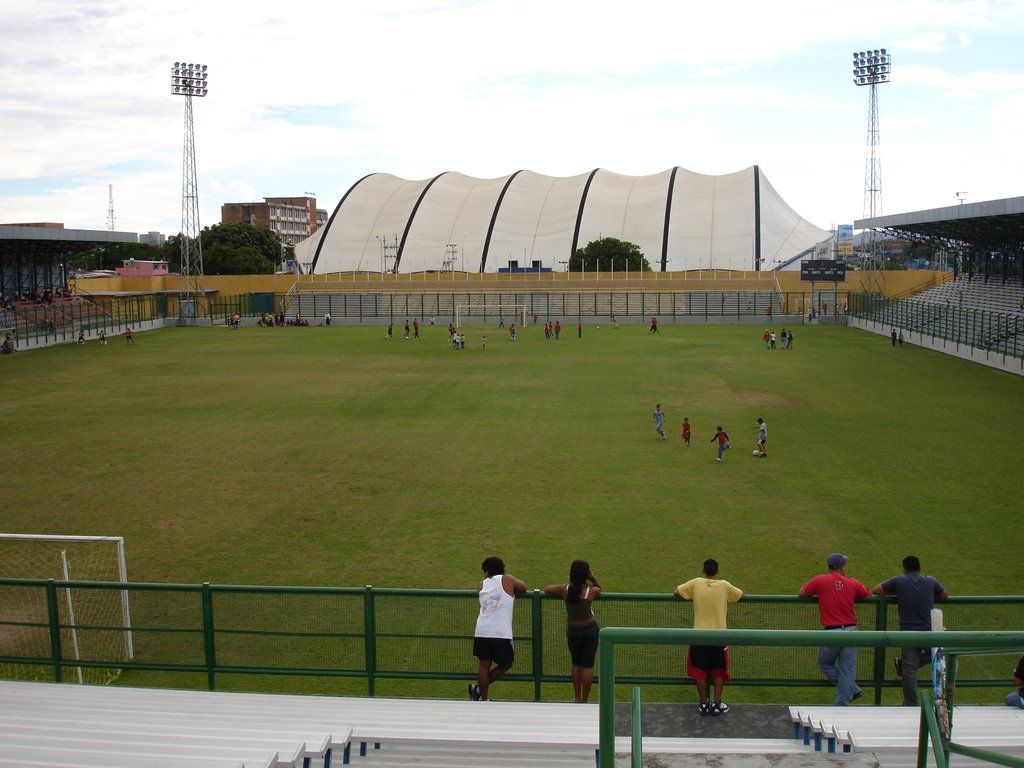
- Farid Richa
- Interactive map of Estadio de Fútbol Farid Richa
- Location: Barquisimeto, Venezuela
- Coordinates: 10°4′49″N 69°19′45″W
- Owner: Instituto Nacional de Deportes
- Capacity: 12,480
- Surface: grass

Construction
- Opened: 2001

Tenant
- Unión Lara

The Farid Richa Stadium is a football facility located in the capital city of Lara state, Barquisimeto, in the central-western part of Venezuela. It serves as the home ground for the second-division local football teams Policía de Lara F. C., Unión Lara S. C., and Unión Deportiva Lara. Additionally, it hosts the top-division team Asociación Civil Deportivo Lara. The stadium was named in honor of the distinguished Lebanese-origin player, Farid Richa.

== History ==
In the 1960s, Barquisimeto had no football stadium. Farid Richa, the president of the Lara State Football Association, with the support of both government and private sources, mostly the latter, managed to construct a football stadium for Barquisimeto, which, starting from 1963, was named in his eternal tribute.

It was reinaugurated in 2001 to host the Juvines Lara 2001. Currently, it hosts games from the second division of the Venezuelan Football Federation and has an approximate capacity of 12,480 spectators. The Lara FC played its home matches in this facility until its dissolution. Presently, Unión Lara S.C., Policía de Lara Fútbol Club, and Unión Deportiva Lara are the teams that use the field for their home matches. Also, the top-division team in the FutVe League, Asociación Civil Deportivo Lara, plays here. The stadium underwent significant renovation in 1982 to host the Bolivarian Games held that year.
