= Alfredo Quesada =

Peruvian footballer (born 1949)

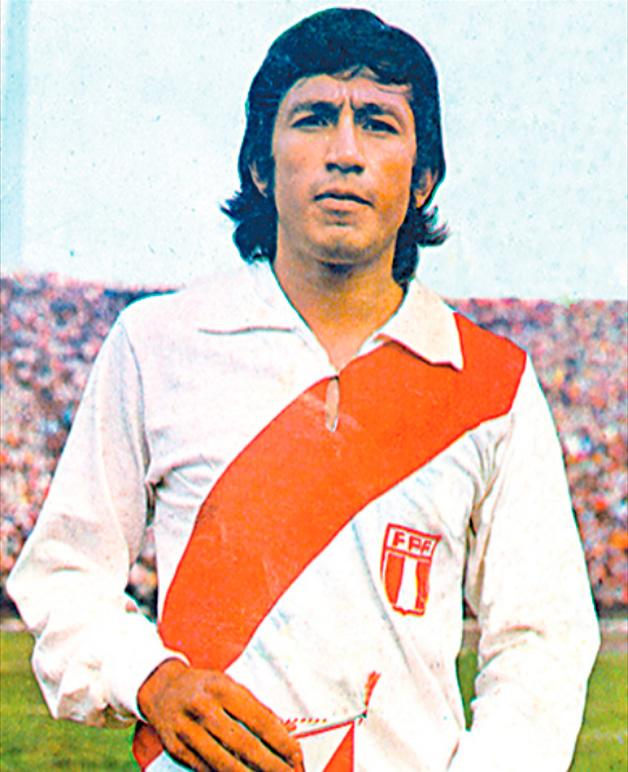

Personal information
- Full name: Alfredo Quesada Farías
- Date of birth: 22 September 1949 (age 77)
- Place of birth: Talara, Peru
- Height: 1.75 m (5 ft 9 in)
- Position: Midfielder

Senior career*
Years	Team	Apps	(Gls)
1968–1984	Sporting Cristal		

International career
1971–1978	Peru	50	(1)
- * Club domestic league appearances and goals

Alfredo Quesada Farías (born 22 September 1949) is a Peruvian football midfielder who played for Peru in the 1978 FIFA World Cup. He also played for Sporting Cristal.

== International career ==
Quesada earned 50 caps, scoring one goal, for Peru between 1971 and 1978.
