= Fidel Suárez =

Peruvian footballer (born 1962)

Personal information
- Full name: Fidel Ernesto Suárez Becerra
- Date of birth: 1 January 1962 (age 64)
- Place of birth: Piura, Peru
- Position: Forward

Senior career*
Years	Team	Apps	(Gls)
1981	Sporting Cristal		
1982	Deportivo UNP		
1983–1984	Atlético Torino		
1985–1989	Universitario		
1990	Deportes Iquique	26	(10)
1991	Sport Boys		
1991–1992	Cobresal	26	(7)
1992–1993	Sporting Cristal		
1994	San Agustín		
1994–1995	Atlético Marte		
1995–1996	Alianza Atlético	38	(18)
1997	Atlético Torino		
1998	Melgar		

International career
1989	Peru	1	(0)

Managerial career
- 2003–2004: Virgen de Chapi
- 2008: Tayca Chilcal
- 2015: Atlético Grau
- 2016: Atlético Torino
- 2022: Defensor La Bocana
- * Club domestic league appearances and goals

Fidel Ernesto Suárez Becerra (born January 1, 1962, in Piura) is a Peruvian retired footballer who played for clubs in Peru, Chile and El Salvador.

== Career ==
In 1987 Suárez would have his best year in his soccer career, managing to reach his second national title with Universitario, and, in addition, he managed to be the top scorer of the season with 29 goals.

In Chile, Suárez played for Deportes Iquique and Cobresal in 1990 and 1991, respectively.

== Personal life ==
Suárez had a twin brother, José, died in 2022, who also was a footballer. Due to this, he is nicknamed El Mellizo (The Twin). Both his older brother, Félix, and his uncle, Manuel, were also footballers.

== Titles ==
- Universitario 1985, 1987 and 1990 (Peruvian Primera División Championship)
