= Germán Leguía =

Peruvian footballer (born 1954)

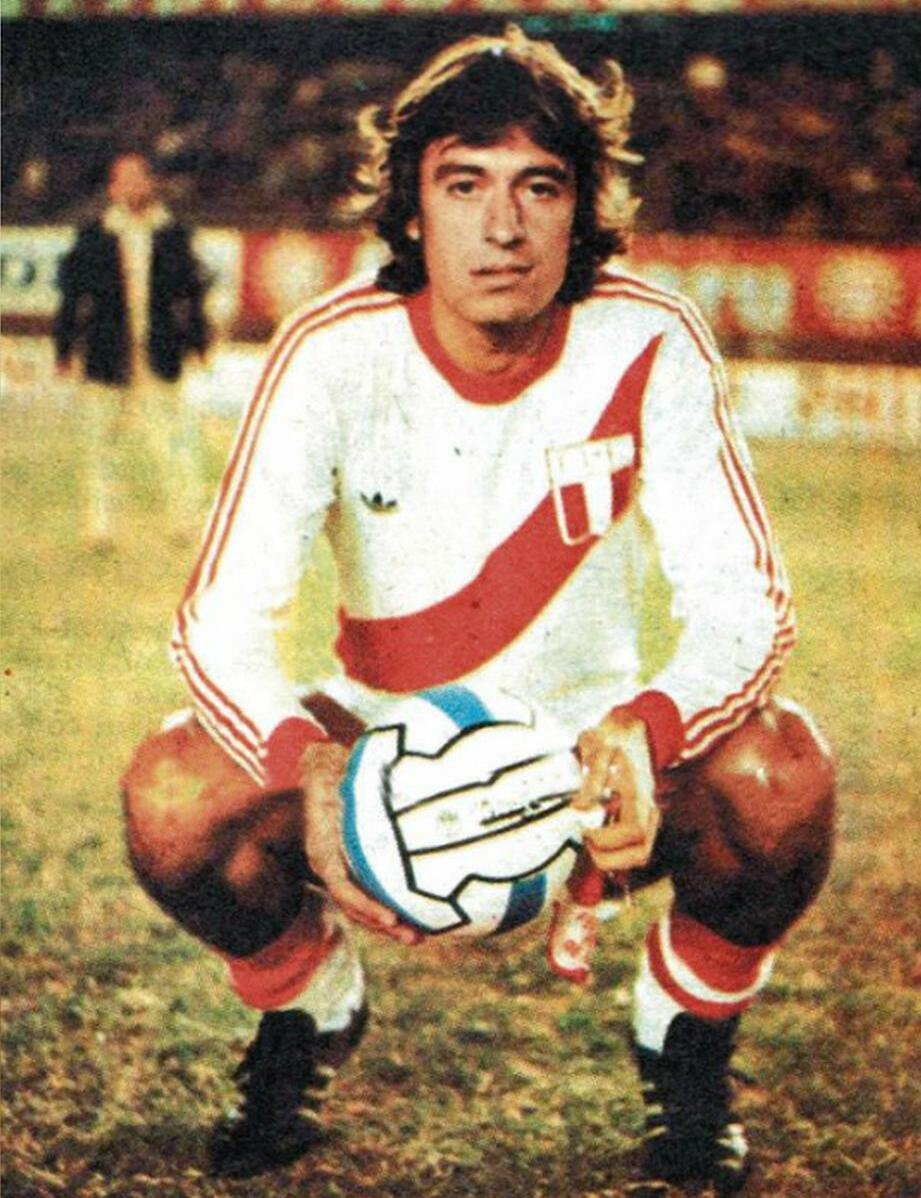
- Leguía in 1979

Personal information
- Full name: Germán Carlos Leguía Dragó
- Date of birth: 2 January 1954 (age 72)
- Place of birth: Lima, Peru
- Height: 1.86 m (6 ft 1 in)
- Position: Midfielder

Senior career*
Years	Team	Apps	(Gls)
1974–1975	Lawn Tennis		
1976–1977	Deportivo Municipal		
1978–1983	Universitario		
1983–1985	Elche	50	(6)
1985–1986	1. FC Köln	0	(0)
1986	Beveren	0	(0)
1987	Farense		
1988	Macará		
1989	Aucas		
1989–1990	Universitario		
1991	Sport Boys		

International career
1978–1983	Peru	31	(3)
- * Club domestic league appearances and goals

Germán Carlos Leguía Dragó, also known as Cocoliche, (born 2 January 1954, in Lima) is a retired professional football striker and midfielder from Peru.

He competed for the Peru national football team at the 1978 and 1982 FIFA World Cup, and obtained a total number of 31 caps for his native country, scoring three goals, in the years 1978 to 1983.

== Playing career ==
=== Club ===
Leguía began playing football in his native Peru with Club Universitario de Deportes and moved to Europe in 1983. He joined Segunda División side Elche CF, helping the club gain promotion to La Liga in his first season, but the club were relegated at the end of the 1984–85 season. Next, Leguía moved to Germany to play for 1. FC Köln, however he didn't settle due to problems with his registration and never appeared in an official match for the club. He then had a spell at Belgian side Beveren for whom he only played three cup matches before disappearing back to Germany and spent half a season at Portuguese side Farense.

In 1987, he transferred from Germany to Ecuador where he played for Macará until 1989.

Leguía played club football until 1991, when his Universitario de Deportes coach benched him before the final of the 1990 Peruvian championship, and he subsequently decided to retire.

=== International ===
Leguía played for Peru at the 1979 and 1983 Copa América.

== Managerial career ==
After he retired from playing, became a football coach. He managed former club Universitario during 2009.
