= Félix Suárez (poet) =

Mexican writer

- Born: 1961 (age 63–64); Ixtlahuaca, State of Mexico, Mexico
- Occupation: Poet, essayist and editor

Félix Suárez (born 1961) is a Mexican poet, essayist and editor. He was born in Ixtlahuaca, State of Mexico.
