= Jorge Cordero (footballer) =

Peruvian footballer (born 1962)

Personal information
- Full name: Jorge Baltazar Cordero Aróstegui
- Date of birth: 6 January 1962 (age 64)
- Place of birth: Ica, Peru
- Height: 1.80 m (5 ft 11 in)
- Position: Midfielder

Senior career*
Years	Team	Apps	(Gls)
1984–1985	Alianza Lima		
1987–1990	Unión Huaral		
1990–1991	Gimnasia	20	(5)
1991–1992	Defensor Lima		
1994	Deportivo Sipesa		
1995	Sport Boys	25	(3)
1996	La Loretana	24	(3)

International career
1987–1991	Peru	14	(0)
- * Club domestic league appearances and goals

Jorge Baltazar Cordero Aróstegui (born 6 January 1962) is a retired Peruvian international footballer.

== Career ==
Born in Ica, Cordero played for several local sides as well as in Argentina for Gimnasia y Esgrima La Plata. Cordero made 14 appearances for the Peru national football team from 1987 to 1991. He participated in the 1991 Copa América.
