= Hugo Sotil =

Peruvian footballer (1949–2024)

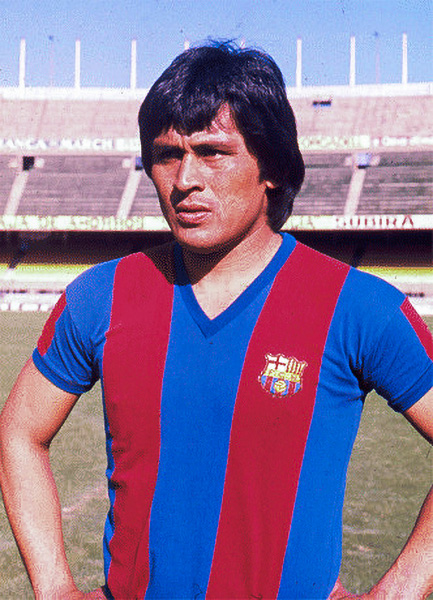
- Sotil with FC Barcelona

Personal information
- Full name: Hugo Alejandro Sotil Yerén
- Date of birth: 18 May 1949
- Place of birth: Ica, Peru
- Date of death: 30 December 2024 (aged 75)
- Place of death: Lima, Peru
- Height: 1.70 m (5 ft 7 in)
- Position: Striker

Youth career
- Club Gaillard
- Deportivo Municipal

Senior career*
Years	Team	Apps	(Gls)
1968–1973	Deportivo Municipal	121	(57)
1973–1977	Barcelona	58	(15)
1977–1978	Alianza Lima	45	(25)
1979–1980	Independiente Medellín	32	(8)
1981–1982	Deportivo Municipal	20	(7)
1984	Los Espartanos	10	(4)
1986	Deportivo Junin	1	(0)
Total		287	(116)

International career
1970–1978	Peru	62	(18)

Managerial career
- 1985: Los Espartanos
- 1986: Deportivo Junin
- 1999: Deportivo Municipal
Medal record
Men's football
Representing Peru
Copa América
Winner	1975
- * Club domestic league appearances and goals

Hugo Alejandro Sotil Yerén (18 May 1949 – 30 December 2024) was a Peruvian professional footballer. Nicknamed El Cholo, he played as a striker or midfielder. Together with Teófilo Cubillas and Héctor Chumpitaz, he was one of Peru's most recognized football players of the 1970s. He also was a popular player in Peru, and a biopic on his life was released in that decade. He was a member of the Peru national team that won the 1975 Copa América and reached the quarterfinals in Mexico 1970 and Argentina 1978.

Sotil made his professional debut in 1967, standing out with Deportivo Municipal and became one of the most popular players in Peru. In 1973 he gained international fame by signing for FC Barcelona forming a historic attacking duo with the Dutch star Johan Cruyff winning the Spanish Primera División in his first season after 14 years of drought for the Catalan club. He became the first Latin American player to wear the "10" for FC Barcelona. Carrying the number 10 on his back in addition to getting two league runners-up and one in the Copa del Rey after four seasons with the Barça shirt. In 1977 he returned to Peru and became two-time national champion with Alianza Lima in 1977 and 1978.

In 1973 he joined the starting team of the America national team that faced the Europe team of Johan Cruyff, Eusébio and Giacinto Facchetti. The match ended 4–4, and Sotil scored the third goal for his team, then in a penalty shootout the American team won 7–6. That night he played alongside other South American figures such as Rivellino, Fernando Morena, Miguel Brindisi, Víctor Espárrago, Teófilo Cubillas and others.

He was international with the Peruvian team, with which he played two editions of the FIFA World Cup: those of 1970 and 1978, where he reached the quarterfinals in both World Cups. On a continental level, he won the Copa América in 1975, where he scored the only goal of the final match against Colombia, giving the Inca team the title of Champions of America.

In 1972, Sotil starred in the film Cholo, directed by Bernardo Batievsky.

== Club career ==
=== Deportivo Municipal ===
In 1968, Sotil made his debut at the professional level for Deportivo Municipal in the Peruvian Segunda División, which he helped to obtain promotion to the Peruvian Primera División that year.

Sotil also played and scored the opening goal in an all-star match between Europe and South America in 1973 at the Camp Nou in Barcelona. Football greats such as Johan Cruyff, Franz Beckenbauer, Rivellino and Teófilo Cubillas took part in that game. The game finished 4–4 and in penalty kicks, South America won 7–6.

=== Barcelona ===
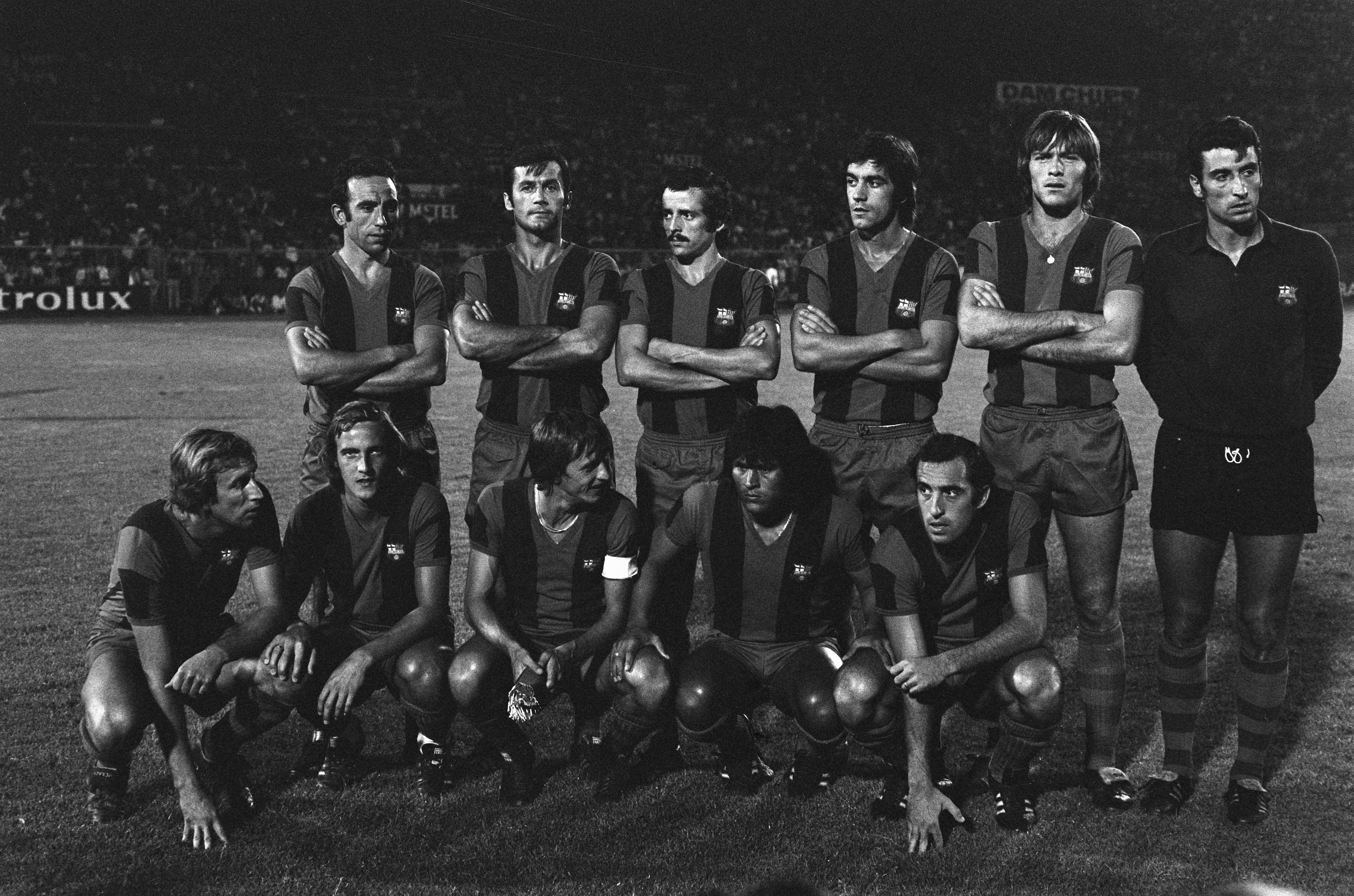
Sotil (first row, second to right) in 1975

In 1973, Sotil moved to FC Barcelona of Spain, where he was teammate of the stars Johan Cruyff, Juan Manuel Asensi and Carles Rexach, among others. He was the club's striker, holding the number ten shirt. He made his debut for Barça on 22 August, winning the Joan Gamper Trophy after beating Borussia Mönchengladbach 4–2 in penalties (2–2 in normal time), with Sotil scoring the opening goal.

In the 1973–74 season, Barcelona won the Spanish Primera División after 14 trophyless seasons. Sotil was part of the team which demolished Real Madrid 5–0 in the Spanish League game played at the Santiago Bernabéu Stadium, where he scored the fifth goal. On 21 August 1974, Sotil won his second Joan Gamper Trophy after a 4–1 victory against Rangers. By then, he was one of the Spanish League's most recognized players

Barcelona's hiring of Dutchman Johan Neeskens, who took a foreigner slot, resulted in his relegation from the first team in the 1974–75 season. Barcelona occupied third place, and Catalan people demanded the return of Sotil to the team first for 1975–76 season.

He stayed with Barcelona for three seasons (1973 to 1976), played 113 games, and scored 36 goals.

=== Alianza Lima ===
In 1977, Sotil returned to Peru and played for Alianza Lima. He had a brief resurgence in form that lasted for two seasons, showing that, although he had lost some of his pace, he retained his skills. He helped the team to win the 1977 and 1978 titles leaving a trail of 23 goals in 48 matches and a good 1978 Copa Libertadores.

=== Independiente Medellín ===
In 1979, Sotil went to Colombia, where he did not perform well. Constantly in and out of the lineup and only able to score 8 goals in 33 matches Sotil considered retiring from playing.

=== Second stint at Deportivo Municipal ===
But Sotil decided he would make one final push going back to Deportivo Municipal and playing there until 1982, and returning briefly to football in 1984, playing for Los Espartanos, a small provincial team.

== International career ==
=== Summary ===
Sotil made his debut for the Peru national team on 4 February 1970, in a friendly game against Bulgaria at Lima, he scored a hat-trick for Peru in a 5–3 win. He made a total of 62 appearances for Peru between 1970 and 1978, scoring 18 goals.

=== 1970 FIFA World Cup: Quarter Finals ===
Sotil was part of the Peru national team in the 1970 World Cup in Mexico and although he was used most often as a substitute in the tournament, he was still able to play in a 3–2 win against Bulgaria, a 3–0 win against Morocco and a 3–1 loss to West Germany. He was also in the quarterfinal loss against eventual champions Brazil by 4–2. Sotil is also much remembered for his assists, as he helped teammate Teófilo Cubillas to capture the Bronze Boot.

=== Copa America 1975: Champion ===
Sotil won the 1975 Copa América, playing only in the final game since his club did not allow him to travel often. Sotil arrived in Caracas, where the final was played, and he went immediately from the airport to the stadium, arriving when all his teammates were warming up. In that game, against Colombia, Sotil scored the only goal, giving Peru its second title as South American champions.

=== 1978 FIFA World Cup: Second Round ===
Peru finished first in the South American qualifying subgroup for the 1978 FIFA World Cup qualification after draws with Ecuador, 1–1, and Chile, 1–1, in the first leg and wins by 4–0 against Ecuador a victory against Chile 2–0 in the second leg, with Sotil scoring one and assisting the other to Juan Carlos Oblitas.

At the 1978 FIFA World Cup Sotil appeared in two out of three group stage matches. His first start of the competition was a 3–1 win over Scotland, on 3 June. After a draw with the Netherlands, 0–0, and a win over Iran 4–1, Peru pushed the Netherlands into second place in Group 4. Expectations were high for Peru, however, with three losses, Peru finished at the bottom of their group went out in the second round. Sotil failed to score in the tournament.

== Death ==
On 20 December 2024, Sotil was hospitalized in Lima under intensive care after experiencing septic shock due to multiple organ failure. He died ten days later, on 30 December, from kidney and liver failure. Sotil was 75.

== Career statistics ==
=== Club ===
Appearances and goals by club, season and competition
Club	Season	League			National cup		Continental		Other		Total	
Club	Season	Division	Apps	Goals	Apps	Goals	Apps	Goals	Apps	Goals	Apps	Goals
Deportivo Municipal	1968	Segunda División		14								14
Deportivo Municipal	1969	Torneo Descentralizado	18	10							18	10
Deportivo Municipal	1970	Torneo Descentralizado	26	12							26	12
Deportivo Municipal	1971	Torneo Descentralizado	30	11							30	11
Deportivo Municipal	1972	Torneo Descentralizado	29	14							29	14
Deportivo Municipal	Total		121	57							121	57
Barcelona	1973–74	Primera División	34	11	0	0	2	1	15	6	51	18
Barcelona	1974–75	Primera División	0	0	0	0	0	0	11	4	11	4
Barcelona	1975–76	Primera División	19	3	2	1	5	1	14	6	50	11
Barcelona	1976–77	Primera División	5	1	0	0	3	0	3	2	11	3
Barcelona	Total		58	15	2	1	10	2	43	18	113	36
Alianza Lima	1977	Torneo Descentralizado	30	17							30	17
Alianza Lima	1978	Torneo Descentralizado	15	8			10	5			25	13
Alianza Lima	Total		45	25			10	5			55	30
Independiente Medellín	1979	Campeonato Profesional	22	6							22	6
Independiente Medellín	1980	Campeonato Profesional	10	2							10	2
Independiente Medellín	Total		32	8							32	8
Deportivo Municipal	1981	Torneo Descentralizado	10	4							10	4
Deportivo Municipal	1982	Torneo Descentralizado	10	3			3	0			13	3
Deportivo Municipal	Total		20	7			3	0			23	7
Los Espartanos	1984	Copa Perú										
Los Espartanos	1985	Torneo Descentralizado	10	4							10	4
Los Espartanos	Total											
Deportivo Junín	1986	Torneo Descentralizado	1	0							1	0
Career total								7				

=== International ===
List of international goals scored by Hugo Sotil
No.	Date	Venue	Opponent	Score	Result	Competition	Ref.
1	7 February 1970	Estadio Nacional, Lima, Peru	Czech Republic	1–0	2–1	Friendly	
2	21 February 1970	Estadio Nacional, Lima, Peru	Bulgaria	1–0	1–3	Friendly	
3	24 February 1970	Estadio Nacional, Lima, Peru	Bulgaria	1–1	5–3	Friendly	
4	24 February 1970	Estadio Nacional, Lima, Peru	Bulgaria	4–3	5–3	Friendly	
5	24 February 1970	Estadio Nacional, Lima, Peru	Bulgaria	5–3	5–3	Friendly	
6	21 April 1970	Estadio Nacional, Lima, Peru	El Salvador	2–0	3–0	Friendly	
7	11 August 1971	Estadio Nacional, Lima, Peru	Chile	1–0	1–0	Copa del Pacífico	
8	11 June 1972	Estádio Couto Pereira, Curitiba, Brazil	Bolivia	3–0	3–0	Brazil Independence Cup	
9	4 March 1973	Estadio Nacional, Lima, Peru	Guatemala	5–0	5–0	Friendly	
10	24 March 1973	Estadio Nacional, Lima, Peru	Bolivia	2–0	2–0	Friendly	
11	28 March 1973	Estadio Nacional, Lima, Peru	Paraguay	1–0	1–0	Friendly	
12	29 April 1973	Estadio Nacional, Lima, Peru	Chile	1–0	2–0	1974 FIFA World Cup qualification	
13	29 April 1973	Estadio Nacional, Lima, Peru	Chile	2–0	2–0	1974 FIFA World Cup qualification	
14	22 October 1975	Estadio Olímpico, Caracas, Venezuela	Colombia	1–0	1–0	1975 Copa America	
15	9 February 1977	Estadio Nacional, Lima, Peru	Hungary	3–1	3–2	Friendly	
16	26 March 1977	Estadio Nacional, Lima, Peru	Chile	1–0	2–0	1978 FIFA World Cup qualification	
17	26 May 1977	Port-au-Prince, Haiti	Haiti	1–0	2–1	Friendly	

== Honours ==
Barcelona

- Spanish Primera División: 1973–74; runner-up 1975–76
- Joan Gamper Trophy: 1973, 1974, 1975, 1976
- Copa del Rey runner-up: 1973–74

Alianza Lima

- Peruvian Primera División: 1977, 1978

Deportivo Municipal

- Peruvian Segunda División: 1968
- Peruvian Primera División runner-up: 1981

Los Espartanos

- Copa Perú: 1984

Peru

- Copa América: 1975

Individual

- Peruvian Footballer of the Year: 1973
- CONMEBOL XI All-Star Team: 1973
- Peruvian Footballer of the Year: 1974
- Named one of the Great Stars of the World Cup History: 2006
- Peruvian Segunda División top goalscorer (14 goals): 1968
