= José Velásquez (footballer, born 1952) =

Peruvian footballer

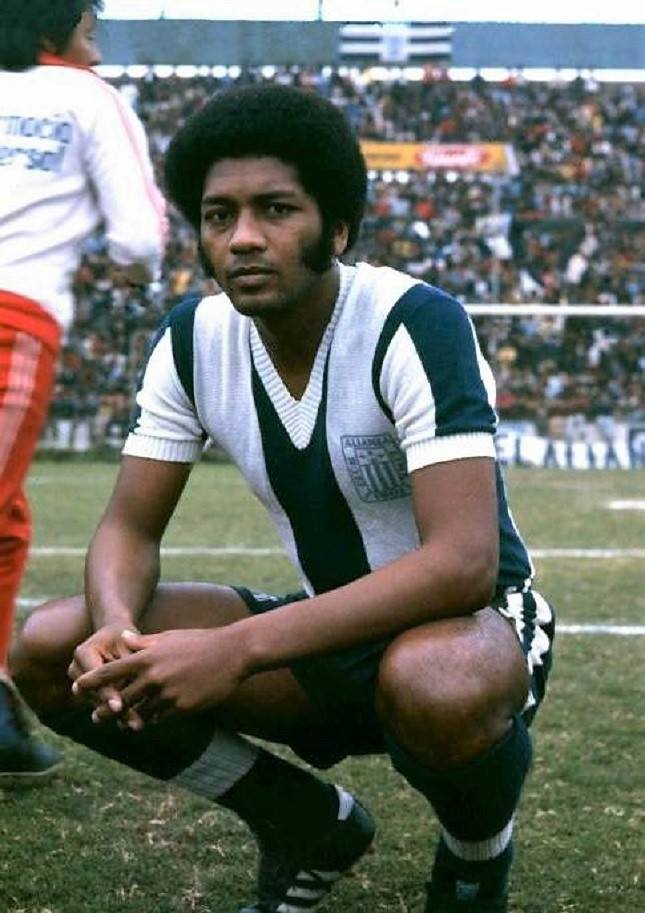
- Velásquez playing for Alianza Lima

Personal information
- Full name: José Manuel Velásquez Castillo
- Date of birth: 4 June 1952 (age 74)
- Place of birth: Lima, Peru
- Height: 1.88 m (6 ft 2 in)
- Position: Defensive midfielder

Senior career*
Years	Team	Apps	(Gls)
1971–1978	Alianza Lima		(44)
1979	Independiente Medellín		
1980–1981	Toronto Blizzard	28	(2)
1982	Independiente Medellín		
1982–1984	Alianza Lima	50	(3)
1984–1985	Hércules	12	(0)
1986–1987	Deportes Iquique	29	(8)
1987	Alianza Lima	13	(4)

International career
1972–1985	Peru	82	(12)
Medal record
Men's football
Representing Peru
Copa América
Winner	1975
Bronze medal – third place	1979
Bronze medal – third place	1983
- * Club domestic league appearances and goals as of April 2008

José Manuel Velásquez Castillo (born 4 June 1952 in Lima) is a Peruvian former footballer who played as a midfielder. Nicknamed "El Patrón", he stood out for his elegance, presence, courage and technical play, being recognized as one of the players with the most personality that Peruvian football has given and the best defensive midfielder in the history of his country. He was nominated for the Global Ballon d'Or by FIFA in 1977.

"El Patrón" was probably the best midfielder defensive player in South America between the late 1970s and early 1980s. He was a containment midfielder with an enormous defensive display, great passing game and strong personality that combined his dominant physical presence with a very technical and elegant game. He formed with Alianza Lima debuting in 1971 at the age of 17 as a central defender, although he was soon positioned in the midfield and became one of the greatest "blue and white" leaders, winning the Peruvian Primera División and integrating one of the best teams in the club's history during the two-time championship in 1977 and 1978. In 1979 he emigrated to Colombia to join Independiente Medellín, in which he coincided with his compatriot Hugo Sotil, and then he also went through the Toronto Blizzard and Hercules of the Spanish First Division.

He was a member of the Peruvian team that won the 1975 Copa América and participated in the World Cup in Argentina 1978, where he reached the quarterfinals of final and Spain 1982 where it was important in the qualifiers to eliminate Uruguay and Colombia.

== Club career ==
At club level he played for Alianza Lima in Peru, where he was part of three league championship winning campaigns (1975, 1977 & 1978). He also played for Independiente Medellín of Colombia, Hércules CF of Spain and Deportes Iquique of Chile.

== International career ==
Nicknamed "El Patrón", he played for the Peru national football team that won the Copa América in 1975 and competed at the 1978 and 1982 FIFA World Cup, wearing the number six jersey. He played a total of 82 games for Peru between 1972 and 1985, scoring 12 goals.

=== International goals ===
Scores and results table. Peru's goal tally first:

List of international goals scored by José Velásquez
No.	Date	Venue	Opponent	Score	Result	Competition
1.	9 February 1977	Estadio Nacional, Lima, Peru	Hungary	1–0	3–2	Friendly
2.	9 February 1977	Estadio Nacional, Lima, Peru	Hungary	2–1	3–2	Friendly
3.	12 March 1977	Estadio Nacional, Lima, Peru	Ecuador	1–0	4–0	1978 World Cup Qualifier
4.	29 May 1977	Port-au-Prince, Haiti	Haiti	2–1	2–2	Friendly
5.	17 July 1977	Estadio Olímpico Pascual Guerrero, Cali, Colombia	Bolivia	3–0	5–0	1978 World Cup Qualifier
6.	17 July 1977	Estadio Olímpico Pascual Guerrero, Cali, Colombia	Bolivia	5–0	5–0	1978 World Cup Qualifier
7.	11 June 1978	Estadio Chateau Carreras, Córdoba, Argentina	Iran	1–0	4–1	1978 FIFA World Cup
8.	17 May 1982	Estadio Nacional, Lima, Peru	Romania	1–0	2–1	Friendly
9.	24 February 1985	Estadio Nacional, Santiago, Chile	Chile	1–0	2–1	Friendly
10.	27 February 1985	Estadio Centenario, Montevideo, Uruguay	Uruguay	1–0	2–2	Friendly
11.	23 April 1985	Estadio Nacional, Lima, Peru	Uruguay	1–1	2–1	Friendly
12.	30 June 1985	Estadio Monumental, Buenos Aires, Argentina	Argentina	1–1	2–2	1986 World Cup Qualifier

== Honours ==
=== Club ===
Alianza Lima

- Peruvian League: 1975, 1977, 1978

=== International ===
Peru national football team

- Copa América: 1975
