= Freddy Ravello =

Peruvian footballer (born 1955)

Personal information
- Full name: Freddy Medardo Ravello Ubillas
- Date of birth: 28 January 1955 (age 71)
- Place of birth: Lima, Peru
- Position: Forward

Senior career*
| Years | Team | Apps | (Gls) |
| 1973 | José Gálvez | | |
| 1974–1976 | Deportivo Municipal | | |
| 1976–1983 | Alianza Lima | ? | (101) |
| 1984 | Deportivo Municipal | | |

International career
| 1979–1982 | Peru | 11 | (1) |
- * Club domestic league appearances and goals

Freddy Medardo Ravello Ubillas (born 28 January 1955) is a Peruvian former footballer who played as a forward. He made eleven appearances for the Peru national team from 1979 to 1982.

== Career ==
Ravello began his playing career in 1973 with José Gálvez of Chimbote, before moving on to Deportivo Municipal. Spotted by Alianza Lima, he joined the club in 1976 and played there until 1983. A true specialist in penalty kicks, he won two league titles—in 1977 (finishing as top scorer with 21 goals) and 1978.

As a member of the Peruvian national team, he took part in the 1979 Copa América, reaching the semi-finals. He earned 11 caps for his country, scoring his only international goal in a friendly match against Ecuador on August 8, 1979.

== Honours ==
Alianza Lima

- Torneo Descentralizado (2): 1977, 1978
- Torneo Descentralizado Top scorer: 1977 (21 goals)

Peru XI

- Bolivarian Games: 1973
