= Manuel Suárez (Peruvian footballer) =

Peruvian footballer (1940–2012)

Personal information
- Full name: Manuel Antonio Suárez Paz
- Date of birth: 10 February 1940
- Place of birth: Piura, Peru
- Date of death: 10 January 2012 (aged 71)
- Place of death: Piura, Peru
- Position: Forward

Youth career
- Estrella Roja
- 1957: Municipal Buenos Aires
- 1958–1959: Alfonso Ugarte Barrio Sur

Senior career*
Years	Team	Apps	(Gls)
1960–1966	Atlético Grau		
1967	Alfonso Ugarte (Chiclín)		
1968	GASA Cruz de Chalpón		
1969	Mariscal Castilla (Sullana)		
1970–1986	Atlético Grau		

Managerial career
- 1986–?: Atlético Grau
Medal record
Men's football
Representing Peru
Bolivarian Games
Gold medal – first place	1961 Barranquilla
- * Club domestic league appearances and goals

Manuel Antonio Suárez Paz (10 February 1940 – 10 January 2012) was a Peruvian manager and former player.

Nicknamed Meleque, he is considered the most influential player for Atlético Grau of his hometown of Piura, where he also served as coach in the 1980s.

His nephew, Fidel Suárez, was a Peruvian international footballer.

== Biography ==
He joined Atlético Grau in 1960 and participated in the first decentralized Peruvian championship in 1966 (a championship open to provincial teams). However, disagreements with the club forced him to seek a change of scenery, and he joined Alfonso Ugarte de Chiclín, with whom he won the inaugural Copa Perú in 1967. This allowed him to participate in the first division championship that same year.

He returned to Atlético Grau in 1970 and remained there ever since. He won a second Copa Perú in 1972, which allowed the club to return to the first division. In 1981, he took on the role of player-manager. He ended his playing career in 1986 but immediately became the head coach of Atlético Grau.

Manuel Suárez never received a call-up to the Peruvian national team. Nevertheless, he participated in the 1961 Bolivarian Games in Barranquilla with the Peruvian amateur team – coached by Dan Georgiadis – and won the gold medal.

Having retired from football, he died in Piura on 10 January 2012.

== Honours ==
Alfonso Ugarte de Chiclín

- Copa Perú: 1967

Atlético Grau

- Copa Perú: 1972

Peru (amateur)

- Bolivarian Games: 1961
