= 1977 Torneo Descentralizado =

Torneo Descentralizado
- Season: 1977
- Dates: 13 February 1977 – 22 January 1978
- Champions: Alianza Lima
- Runner up: Sporting Cristal
- Relegated: Cienciano
- Copa Libertadores: Alianza Lima; Sporting Cristal
- Top goalscorer: Freddy Ravello (21 goals)

The 1977 Torneo Descentralizado, the top category of Peruvian football (soccer), was played by 16 teams. The national champion was Alianza Lima.

The season was divided into 3 stages. The Preliminary Tournament contested in two groups (home and away matches plus 2 inter-group matches); each group winner qualified for the Championship Group. The second stage was the Descentralised (league tournament); the top 4 qualified for the Championship Group and the bottom two played for relegation. Championship Group was contested by 6 teams in home and away matches; teams carried their Descentralised Tournament record. Although finishing fifth in Descentralised, Universitario qualified for Championship Group, as Alianza had already qualified in Preliminary Tournament. Municipal and Cienciano played a third relegation playoff on a neutral ground, as each team won one match after home and away matches.

== Teams ==
=== Team changes ===
Promoted from 1976 Copa Perú	Relegated from 1976 Primera División
▲ Coronel Bolognesi (1st)	▼ Carlos A. Mannucci (16th)

=== Stadia locations ===
Locations of the 1977 Primera División teams

Team	City	Stadium	Capacity	Field
Alfonso Ugarte	Puno	Enrique Torres Belón	20,000	Grass
Alianza Lima	La Victoria, Lima	Alejandro Villanueva	35,000	Grass
Atlético Chalaco	Callao	Miguel Grau	15,000	Grass
Cienciano	Cusco	Garcilaso	40,000	Grass
CNI	Iquitos	Max Augustín	24,000	Grass
Coronel Bolognesi	Tacna	Jorge Basadre	19,850	Grass
Defensor Lima	Breña, Lima	Nacional	45,750	Grass
Deportivo Junín	Huancayo	Huancayo	20,000	Grass
Deportivo Municipal	Cercado de Lima	Nacional	45,750	Grass
Juan Aurich	Chiclayo	Elías Aguirre	24,500	Grass
León de Huánuco	Huánuco	Heraclio Tapia	15,000	Grass
Melgar	Arequipa	Mariano Melgar	20,000	Grass
Sport Boys	Callao	Miguel Grau	15,000	Grass
Sporting Cristal	Rímac, Lima	Nacional	45,750	Grass
Unión Huaral	Huaral	Julio Lores Colan	10,000	Grass
Universitario	Breña, Lima	Nacional	45,750	Grass

== Torneo Interzonal ==
=== Group A ===
Pos	Team	Pld	W	D	L	GF	GA	GD	Pts	Qualification	ALI	CNI	SBA	CRI	JUN	MEL	UGA	DEF
1	Alianza Lima	16	10	2	4	35	25	+10	22	Liguilla Final		2–2	4–3	2–0	1–0	1–0	4–0	4–2
2	CNI	16	7	7	2	30	20	+10	21		3–3		2–1	3–1	–	–	–	–
3	Sport Boys	16	7	6	3	31	23	+8	20		1–2	1–1		1–1	2–1	1–1	1–0	3–2
4	Sporting Cristal	16	7	4	5	29	24	+5	18		2–3	2–2	1–1		5–3	0–1	5–1	0–0
5	Deportivo Junín	16	6	4	6	26	23	+3	16		3–0	–	2–2	2–0		–	–	–
6	Melgar	16	6	3	7	14	22	−8	15		2–0	–	0–1	2–3	–		–	–
7	Alfonso Ugarte	16	5	3	8	21	25	−4	13		3–2	–	4–4	0–1	–	–		–
8	Defensor Lima	16	1	2	13	19	42	−23	4		2–5	–	1–4	2–4	–	–	–	

Legend: Blue = home team win; Yellow = draw; Red = away team win.

=== Group B ===
Pos	Team	Pld	W	D	L	GF	GA	GD	Pts	Qualification	BOL	HUA	AUR	UNI	CHA	LEO	MUN	CIE
1	Coronel Bolognesi	16	7	5	4	17	10	+7	19	Liguilla Final		–	0–0	0–1	–	–	–	–
2	Unión Huaral	16	6	7	3	18	12	+6	19		–		–	1–0	–	–	–	–
3	Juan Aurich	16	6	7	3	18	13	+5	19		1–0	–		0–1	–	–	–	–
4	Universitario	16	7	4	5	16	15	+1	18		0–1	0–0	2–1		1–0	3–2	0–2	0–0
5	Atlético Chalaco	16	5	6	5	21	19	+2	16		–	–	–	2–2		–	–	–
6	León de Huánuco	16	5	4	7	15	15	0	14		–	–	–	1–1	–		–	–
7	Deportivo Municipal	16	3	5	8	18	23	−5	11		–	–	–	2–3	–	–		–
8	Cienciano	16	3	5	8	12	28	−16	11		–	–	–	1–0	–	–	–	

Legend: Blue = home team win; Yellow = draw; Red = away team win.

=== Interzonal matches ===
Home	Score	Away
Universitario	1–0	Alianza Lima
Sport Boys	2–0	Atlético Chalaco
Deportivo Municipal	1–2	Sporting Cristal
	–	
	–	
	–	
	–	
	–	

Home	Score	Away
Alianza Lima	2–1	Universitario
Atlético Chalaco	2–3	Sport Boys
Sporting Cristal	2–0	Deportivo Municipal
	–	
	–	
	–	
	–	
	–	

== Torneo Descentralizado ==
=== Standings ===
Pos	Team	Pld	W	D	L	GF	GA	GD	Pts	Qualification or relegation
1	CNI	30	14	11	5	39	26	+13	39	Liguilla Final
2	Melgar	30	13	13	4	38	27	+11	39	Liguilla Final
3	Sporting Cristal	30	14	9	7	52	28	+24	37	Liguilla Final
4	Alianza Lima	30	13	11	6	59	40	+19	37	Liguilla Final
5	Universitario	30	11	10	9	44	40	+4	32	Liguilla Final
6	Coronel Bolognesi	30	11	9	10	33	33	0	31	Liguilla Final
7	Sport Boys	30	13	5	12	37	48	−11	31	
8	Atlético Chalaco	30	9	11	10	43	40	+3	29	
9	Unión Huaral	30	9	10	11	44	53	−9	28	
10	Deportivo Junín	30	10	8	12	41	53	−12	28	
11	Defensor Lima	30	9	8	13	48	52	−4	26	
12	Alfonso Ugarte	30	9	8	13	43	47	−4	26	
13	Juan Aurich	30	7	12	11	31	37	−6	26	
14	León de Huánuco	30	10	6	14	35	47	−12	26	
15	Deportivo Municipal	30	7	10	13	36	46	−10	24	Relegation play-off
16	Cienciano	30	6	9	15	21	37	−16	21	Relegation play-off

=== Results ===
Home \ Away	UGA	ALI	CHA	CIE	CNI	BOL	DEF	JUN	MUN	AUR	LEO	MEL	SBA	CRI	HUA	UNI
Alfonso Ugarte		1–2	–	–	–	–	–	–	–	–	–	–	5–2	0–0	–	0–1
Alianza Lima	1–1		0–0	4–0	1–1	4–2	1–1	3–2	0–1	4–0	2–1	1–1	3–1	3–1	6–2	2–2
Atlético Chalaco	–	3–3		–	–	–	–	–	–	–	–	–	0–1	1–4	–	0–4
Cienciano	–	1–4	–		0–1	–	–	–	–	–	–	0–1	0–1	1–0	–	0–0
CNI	–	1–0	–	–		–	–	–	–	–	–	–	3–0	1–1	–	1–0
Coronel Bolognesi	–	1–3	–	–	–		–	–	–	2–0	–	–	0–1	2–0	–	1–1
Defensor Lima	–	1–2	–	–	–	–		–	–	–	–	–	3–0	1–2	–	1–0
Deportivo Junín	–	4–3	–	–	–	–	–		–	–	–	–	4–1	3–1	–	0–1
Deportivo Municipal	–	1–0	–	–	–	–	–	–		–	–	–	4–1	1–1	–	1–1
Juan Aurich	–	0–0	–	–	–	1–1	–	–	–		–	–	2–3	2–1	–	3–1
León de Huánuco	–	3–3	–	–	–	–	–	–	–	–		–	2–1	1–2	–	0–3
Melgar	–	1–1	–	1–0	–	–	–	–	–	–	–		1–1	1–1	–	3–1
Sport Boys	1–2	0–1	1–1	0–0	1–2	2–0	1–0	1–1	1–0	2–1	3–0	2–0		3–1	2–1	0–4
Sporting Cristal	3–0	4–0	1–0	1–0	1–1	0–0	3–0	5–0	2–2	1–2	4–0	1–1	4–0		3–1	2–0
Unión Huaral	–	1–0	–	–	–	–	–	–	–	–	–	–	1–2	0–0		2–1
Universitario	2–0	2–2	1–0	0–0	0–1	2–3	3–0	1–1	1–0	1–1	3–0	3–0	2–2	1–2	2–2	

Updated to match(es) played on 1977. Source:
Legend: Blue = home team win; Yellow = draw; Red = away team win.

== Relegation play-off ==
=== Standings ===
Pos	Team	Pld	W	D	L	GF	GA	GD	Pts	Relegation
1	Deportivo Municipal	3	2	0	1	5	3	+2	4	
2	Cienciano (R)	3	1	0	2	3	5	−2	2	1978 Copa Perú

(R) Relegated

=== Results ===
11 December 1977
15:30

Cienciano	2–1	Deportivo Municipal
Eduardo Riega 10'; José Valenza 46'		Julio Argote 38'

Estadio Garcilaso, Cusco
Attendance: 6,550
Referee: Enrique Labo
16 December 1977
15:30

Deportivo Municipal	3–1	Cienciano
Julio Argote 8'; Augusto Palacios 48'; Germán Leguía 53'		José Valenza 29'

Estadio Alejandro Villanueva, Lima
Attendance: 22,532
Referee: Edison Pérez
18 December 1977
14:30

Deportivo Municipal	1–0	Cienciano
Germán Leguía 41'

Estadio Félix Castillo, Chincha
Attendance: 8,770
Referee: César Orozco

== Liguilla Final ==
=== Standings ===
Pos	Team	Pld	W	D	L	GF	GA	GD	Pts	Qualification	ALI	CRI	MEL	CNI	BOL	UNI
1	Alianza Lima (C)	40	19	14	7	82	50	+32	52	1978 Copa Libertadores		2–0	2–2	1–1	0–3	4–3
2	Sporting Cristal	40	19	11	10	74	40	+34	49	1978 Copa Libertadores	0–0		2–1	8–1	4–1	3–0
3	Melgar	40	17	14	9	51	42	+9	48		0–3	5–2		–	1–0	1–0
4	CNI	40	16	15	9	49	45	+4	47		0–3	0–2	2–0		–	1–1
5	Coronel Bolognesi	40	15	11	14	45	47	−2	41		0–2	1–1	–	0–0		2–1
6	Universitario	40	13	12	15	55	51	+4	38		1–6	1–0	2–0	1–1	1–3	

Legend: Blue = home team win; Yellow = draw; Red = away team win.
(C) Champions

== Top scorers ==
Player	Nationality	Goals	Club
Freddy Ravello	Peru	27	Alianza Lima

== See also ==
- 1977 Copa Perú
