= Ivor Broadis =

English footballer (1922–2019)

Personal information
- Full name: Ivan Arthur Broadis
- Date of birth: 18 December 1922
- Place of birth: Welling, Kent, England
- Date of death: 12 April 2019 (aged 96)
- Position: Inside forward

Senior career*
Years	Team	Apps	(Gls)
1946–1949	Carlisle United	91	(52)
1949–1951	Sunderland	79	(25)
1951–1953	Manchester City	74	(10)
1953–1955	Newcastle United	42	(15)
1955–1959	Carlisle United	159	(32)
1959–1960	Queen of the South	63	(20)
Total		512	(157)

International career
1951–1954	England	14	(8)

Managerial career
- 1946–1949: Carlisle United
- * Club domestic league appearances and goals

Ivan Arthur "Ivor" Broadis (18 December 1922 – 12 April 2019) was an English professional footballer.

During a career spanning nineteen years from 1942 to 1961, Broadis represented Carlisle United, Sunderland, Manchester City, Newcastle United and Queen of the South, gaining 14 caps and scoring eight goals for England at international level. Broadis played at inside forward; after retiring from playing in 1961, he pursued a career as a football journalist. He was the oldest surviving England international footballer until his death in April 2019 at the age of 96.

== Early days ==
Broadis was born in Isle of Dogs, Poplar, London and attended Coopers' Company's School. During the Second World War he completed 500 flying hours in Royal Air Force Wellingtons and Lancasters, although he was never on a bombing mission. During the war he had guested as an amateur for Tottenham Hotspur among other clubs. It was at Tottenham that someone misread his real name (Ivan) as Ivor, and so he inadvertently became known henceforth as Ivor Broadis.

Broadis recalled to the Northern Echo how he was in Italy when news of the Japanese surrender arrived. "Next day we flew hundreds of troops back to England, some of whom hadn't had leave for five years. I was navigator, so I kept passing round notes telling them where we were. It was very emotional when we came over the white cliffs of Dover and you could see all the bonfires down below. I have very fond memories of that."

== Club career ==
=== Carlisle United (first spell) ===
At the end of the war Broadis was posted to Crosby-on-Eden. "Until after the war I'd never been so far north in my life, I thought I'd need a dog team to get up here," recalled Broadis. When Carlisle United heard how close he was, when he was just 23, they offered him the player-manager's position in August 1946. Broadis is still the youngest man to have been player-manager in the English Football League. Broadis is the first manager to transfer himself to another club when he sold himself to Sunderland in January 1949. He consulted his wife before the move, as Blackburn Rovers were also interested. As Broadis told the BBC, "Carlisle got £18,000 for me. It was an incredible amount in those days".

Broadis continued to live in Carlisle, even after his move to Sunderland, and trained with Carlisle United under new manager Bill Shankly. One day Broadis arrived late for training. Shankly's version of what he said to Broadis: "What do you think you're doing? Who do you think you are? If you do the training we do you can train with us and we'll play five-a-side and you'll run your guts out as an example to everybody else". Shankly never said that he made Broadis as a footballer, "but I made him realise what was needed to be a player, and Ivor Broadis was one of the strongest and most dangerous inside forwards that ever played." Broadis' description of events with Shankly: "Bill always regarded himself as the man who saved me, really – the man who gave me to England. I would maybe be lapping round and I admit I could have put a lot more into it. "You sort of take the routine from the club you are with and that was not good enough for Bill. I was doing what I thought Sunderland would be doing, the way they were doing it. And that wasn't Bill's way. You had to come off jiggered. So Bill regarded himself as putting me right and I think there's a lot of truth in that. His strength was not Liverpool. It was the strength he could give to anybody." With Shankly's infectious enthusiasm he would ask Broadis, "Are you doing anything this afternoon? Aye, right then, if you're not, come down to the ground." They would upturn two chimney pots to each be a goal and play one-a-side.

=== Sunderland ===
Of his transfer to Sunderland Broadis remarked, "All I did was exercise the right to be transferred. Blackburn, Man City and Preston were interested but only Bill Murray, the Sunderland manager, came to see me. That's why I joined but it was the board who agreed the fee." On his £12 a week Broadis commented, "When I was playing, the only agent was Dick Tracy." Broadis went on to grace England's top division for the next six-and-a-half seasons.

Sunderland's big spending transfer fees on Broadis and others led to the club being known at this time as the "Bank of England club." Alongside the likes of England internationals Len Shackleton, Dickie Davis, Willie Watson and Wales' Trevor Ford, Broadis scored 27 goals in 84 Sunderland appearances.

Broadis remembers his playing days with affection but not entirely without regret. The inside-forward lamented, "The sad thing about that Sunderland side was that we should have won the League in 1950. They played me at centre-forward against a relegated Man City with three or four games to go and we lost. We finished third in the end. We should have won the league that year, it would have made such a difference." In Sunderland's highest post war finish they ended up 1 point behind retaining champions Portsmouth and also runners up Wolves. This is Broadis' highest ever league finish.

=== Manchester City ===
Broadis moved to recently promoted Manchester City in October 1951, this time for a fee of £25,000. It was there Broadis gained his first England cap and wrote his first newspaper column thanks to the Manchester Evening News.

=== Newcastle United ===
Newcastle United signed Broadis two years later for £20,000. The team already included players like Jackie Milburn, Len White, Scotsmen Bobby "Dazzler" Mitchell and Frank Brennan and Welshman Ivor Allchurch. Like at previous clubs Broadis was well received by the fans and is still warmly remembered. With Broadis at the club Newcastle won the F.A. Cup in 1955 – their last time to date. Broadis did not play in the 3–1 final defeat of ex-club Man City, however, after a disagreement with trainer Norman Smith, his days at St James' Park were numbered.

=== Carlisle United (second spell) ===
Broadis returned to Carlisle in July 1955, when he was signed as player-coach for a fee of £3,500 by manager Fred Emery. Broadis stayed at Brunton Park until June 1959 after which he was off to play in Scotland.

=== Queen of the South ===
Queen of the South, under Jimmy McKinnell Junior, signed Broadis to the Dumfries side for the last of his playing days in 1959. With his passing ability and goal threat Broadis clearly enjoyed his time at Queens, later saying, "The two seasons I spent at Palmerston Park were the best of my career'. With Jim Patterson and Bobby Black already at the club when Broadis arrived, they were joined by George Farm in February 1960.

In his time at QoS he hit four goals on Boxing Day 1959 in a 7–1 home win over Queen's Park. The Doonhamers' other goals came from Percy Dunlop (2) and Bobby Black. The consolation goal for Queen's Park was scored by future Aberdeen and Manchester United manager Alex Ferguson. Broadis scored 20 goals in his 63 league games for Queens. Broadis' performances prompted the offer of a contract from top division Hearts. Broadis decided that he would end his playing days with Queens, however, before moving on to the next step in his career. At the time of his 90th birthday he was the oldest surviving ex-Queens player.

== International career ==
Broadis earned fourteen caps for the England national team, scoring eight goals. In both Broadis' England games at Hampden Park he played in front of crowds over 130,000. In his three games against Scotland (twice against future Queen of the South team-mate George Farm), Broadis was unbeaten (two wins, one draw). Broadis scored three goals against Scotland, all with Farm in goal for the Scots. On a tour of South America, Argentina v England was abandoned at 0–0 after 22 minutes due to a rain storm.

In a game of eight goals in Budapest on 23 May 1954, Broadis was the only England player able to score. In reply, the speed, skill and movement of the Hungary 'Golden Team' featuring Ferenc Puskás, Sándor Kocsis, Zoltán Czibor, Nándor Hidegkuti and József Bozsik scored seven. After the game, bewildered England centre half Syd Owen said, "It was like playing people from outer space". Tom Finney commented of Broadis, "I remember when he had taken his boots off after the Budapest match, he warned everyone, "Don't touch them unless you're wearing gloves, they're red hot". Broadis added, "It's the first time I've ever come off the pitch with a sunburned tongue!" This is still England's record defeat. Broadis had not played when Hungary won 6–3 at Wembley the previous November.

Broadis played at the 1954 FIFA World Cup. Playing in all three England games, Broadis scored two goals, both against Belgium. Broadis was thus the first Englishman to score twice in a game in the World Cup finals, 30 minutes ahead of Nat Lofthouse who also scored two in the same 4–4 draw. Broadis was thus also part of the first England team to play in the World Cup quarter finals.

== Later days ==
Broadis lived in the same Carlisle semi-detached house since 1955. After playing and coaching, he became a football journalist for 45 years. At the time of the 2018 FIFA World Cup, Broadis was the oldest living England international footballer. He was awarded the Freedom of the City of Carlisle on 8 October 2018.

== Career statistics ==
Scores and results list England's goal tally first, score column indicates score after each Broadis goal.

List of international goals scored by Ivor Broadis
No.	Date	Venue	Opponent	Score	Result	Competition
1	18 May 1952		Italy		1–1	Friendly
2	18 April 1953		Scotland		2–2	1952–53 British Home Championship
3	18 April 1953		Scotland		2–2	1952–53 British Home Championship
4	8 June 1953		United States		6–3	Friendly
5	3 April 1954		Scotland		4–2	1953–54 British Home Championship
6	23 May 1954		Hungary		1–7	Friendly
7	17 June 1954		Belgium		4–4	1954 FIFA World Cup
8	17 June 1954		Belgium		4–4	1954 FIFA World Cup
