= László Budai =

Hungarian footballer

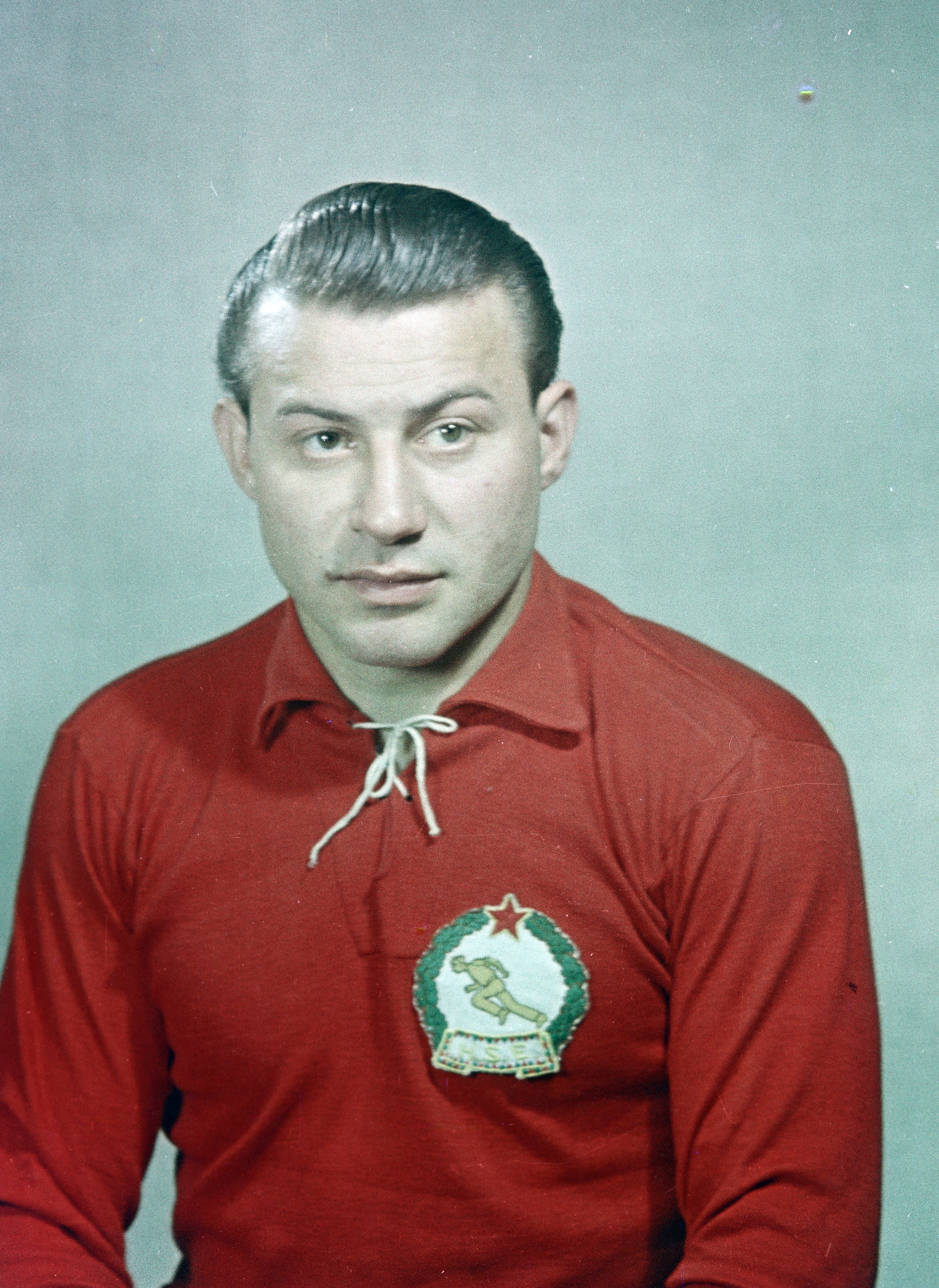
- Budai in 1954

Personal information
- Full name: László Bednarik Budai
- Date of birth: 19 July 1928
- Place of birth: Budapest, Hungary
- Date of death: 2 July 1983 (aged 54)
- Position: Winger

Youth career
- 1942–1947: BRSC

Senior career*
Years	Team	Apps	(Gls)
1947–1948	Huttler Olaj SC		
1948–1950	Ferencvárosi TC		
1950	ÉDOSZ		
1951–1961	Honvéd		

International career
1949–1959	Hungary	39	(10)

Managerial career
- 1962–1967: ETI SC
- 1967–1980: Kossuth KFSE
Medal record
Representing Hungary
Olympic Games
Gold medal – first place	1952 Helsinki
FIFA World Cup
Silver medal – second place	1954 Switzerland
- * Club domestic league appearances and goals

László Budai (19 July 1928 – 2 July 1983), also known as László Bednarik, or Budai II, was a former Hungarian footballer and coach. Budai was born in Budapest and played as a midfielder and forward for Ferencvárosi TC, Honvéd and Hungary. During the 1950s he was a member of the legendary Hungarian national team known as the Mighty Magyars. Other members of the team included Ferenc Puskás, Zoltán Czibor, Sándor Kocsis, József Bozsik and Nándor Hidegkuti. The stadium of Rákospalotai EAC was named after him.

== Club career ==
During his career, Budai won four Hungarian League titles. The first of these came at Ferencvárosi TC in 1949 where his teammates included Zoltán Czibor and Sándor Kocsis. In January 1949 when Hungary became a communist state, Ferencváros were deemed unsuitable to become an army or police club because of its right-wing and nationalist traditions. Instead they were taken over by ÉDOSZ, a food workers union and their best players, including Budai, Czibor and Kocsis, were conscripted into the army team, Honvéd. While at Honvéd, Budai won a further three league titles and the Mitropa Cup.

== Hungarian International ==
Budai made his debut for Hungary on 2 May 1949 in a 6–1 win against Austria in the Central European Championship. He subsequently played 39 times for Hungary and scored 10 goals. Four of these goals came in a 12–0 win against Albania on 24 September 1950. As one of the legendary Mighty Magyars, he helped Hungary become Olympic Champions in 1952, and Central European Champions in 1953. He also played in the Hungary side that defeated England 6–3 at Wembley Stadium. During the 1954 FIFA World Cup he played in the group stage in the 9–0 win against South Korea and in the semi-final against Uruguay. However, despite an excellent performance in the latter game, he was dropped for the final to make room for Ferenc Puskás. He also played two games at the 1958 World Cup.

== Managerial career ==
Between 1967 and 1979, he managed Kossuth KFSE.

== Honours ==
Hungary

- Olympic Champions
  - 1952
- Central European Champions
  - 1953
- World Cup
  - Runner-up: 1954

Ferencváros TC

- Hungarian Champions: 1
  - 1949

Honvéd FC

- Hungarian Champions: 3
  - 1952, 1954, 1955
- Mitropa Cup: 1
  - 1959

== Sources ==
- Behind The Curtain – Travels in Eastern European Football: Jonathan Wilson (2006)
