= 1954 Hungary v England football match =

Hungary vs England 1954 association football friendly
Hungary	England
(Hungary)	(England)
7	1
- Date: 23 May 1954
- Venue: Népstadion, Budapest, Hungary
- Referee: Giorgio Bernardi (Italy)
- Attendance: 92,000

Hungary v England (1954) was an international football game played on 23 May 1954. The game was played between the Hungary national football team—then the world's number one ranked team and the Olympic champions—and the England national football team, hailing from the birthplace of the game of football and reputed "Kings of Football". The game was a return fixture from the 1953 game in the old Wembley Stadium, where Hungary had beaten England 6–3.

England approached the game in the hope that the 6–3 result had been an aberration; instead, Hungary provided a phenomenal masterclass of football, and thrashed England 7–1. The match still remains England's largest defeat to this day.

== Background ==
Under the stewardship of Gusztáv Sebes, Hungary had been unbeaten since May 1950, and had won the 1952 Olympics in Helsinki. They were rated the number one team in the world by FIFA and were firm favourites for the 1954 World Cup.

England were rated the number four team in the world by FIFA, but were still existing in a climate of complacency; the Football Association (FA) saw their country as the originators of the game and assumed English players were technically and physically superior to their foreign counterparts. Coaching and tactical advances from abroad were ignored, in the England national side and the majority of clubs persisting with the outdated WM formation. Manager Walter Winterbottom had no prior managerial experience in professional football, and did not pick the England squad: that role remained with the FA's selection committee, who frequently displayed little or no consistency in their choice of player.

Hungary had visited England in 1953 and delivered a 6–3 thrashing at Wembley—the first time a foreign team outside the British Isles had beaten England on home soil. The result had sent a shockwave through English football, with several prominent managers and players such as Matt Busby, Don Revie, Bill Nicholson and Ron Greenwood realising that the English game had to adapt if the national team was to compete at the highest levels. The FA on the other hand viewed the defeat as a "one-off", and retained Winterbottom and an outdated WM formation for the return game in Budapest.

== Build-up ==
The match was played on 23 May 1954 at Népstadion in Budapest in front of a 92,000 crowd. The England team lined up in its usual WM formation, and included captain Billy Wright, goalkeeper Gil Merrick, winger Tom Finney and inside forward Ivor Broadis. Centre forward Bedford Jezzard was given his debut England cap. The Hungarian team lined up in the 4–2–4 formation pioneered by their coach, Gusztáv Sebes. József Bozsik played in the deep lying midfield position, with Nándor Hidegkuti free to roam between midfield and attack. Ferenc Puskás and Sándor Kocsis were the strikers, with width being provided by Zoltán Czibor and József Tóth.

== Match summary ==
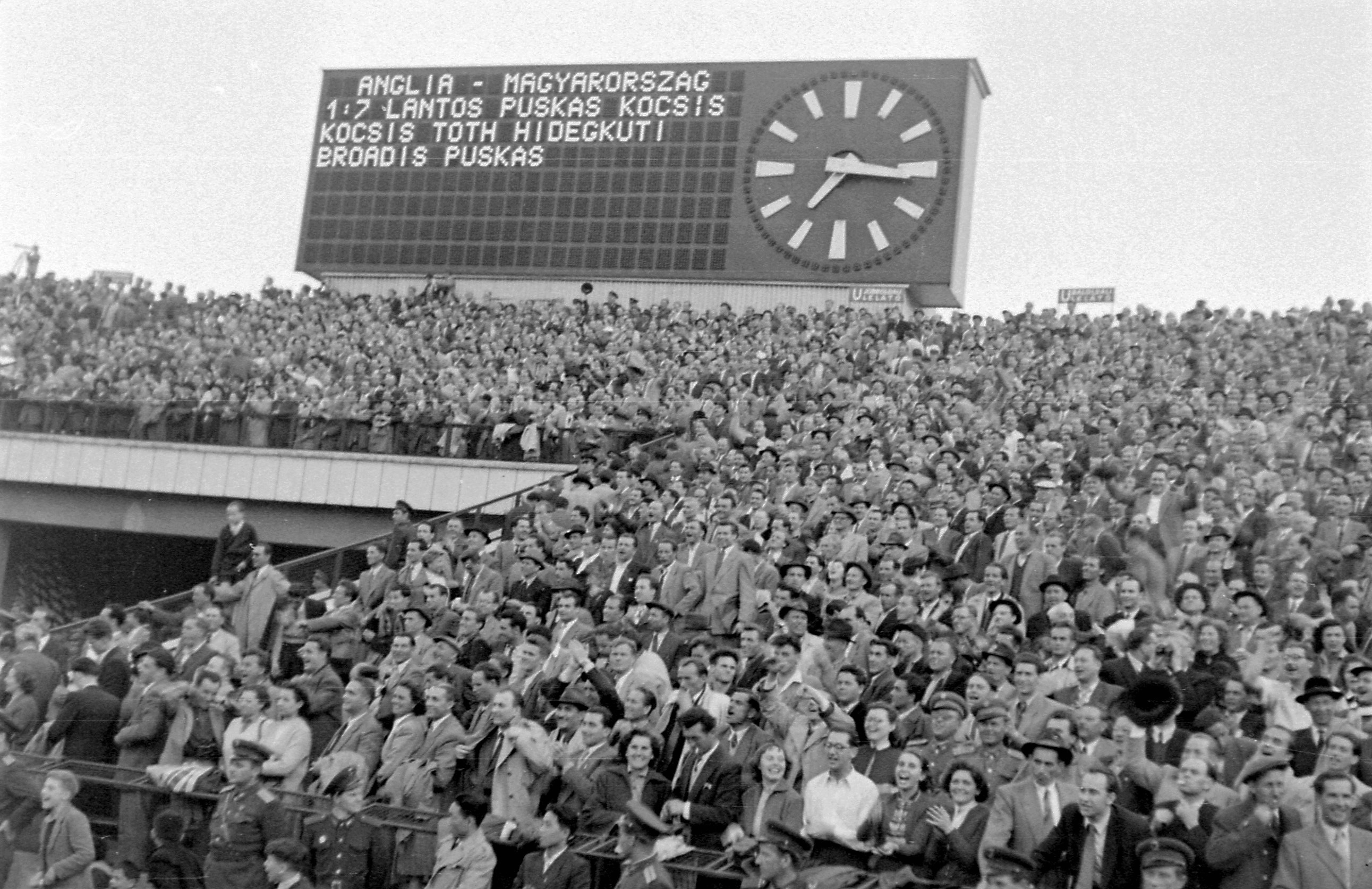
The Hungarian crowd cheers following the conclusion of England's heaviest ever defeat

Hungary dominated the game; England were unable to obtain the ball for much of the time, and when they did they were unable to make any inroads against a fitter and more tactically adept Hungary side. No lessons had been learnt from the 6–3 defeat at Wembley; England were drawn out of position time and time again. Mihály Lantos scored for Hungary after 10 minutes; Ferenc Puskás added a second goal seven minutes later, before Sándor Kocsis made it 3–0 on 19 minutes. England were simply outclassed and outplayed for the rest of the half.

The second half continued in same vein; Kocsis added his second goal on 57 minutes, Nándor Hidegkuti scored two minutes later, Tóth added a sixth and Puskás scored the final Hungarian goal on the 71st minute. It was a wretched tactical performance by England, with the sole highlight being Ivor Broadis scoring with a hooked shot when the Hungarians were 6–0 up.

Centre-half Syd Owen said afterwards that it was "like playing people from outer space".

The final result was Hungary 7 England 1—this still ranks as England's heaviest footballing defeat.

23 May 1954

Hungary	7–1	England
Lantos 10'; Puskás 17', 71'; Kocsis 19', 57'; Hidegkuti 59'; Tóth 63'	Match summary	Broadis 68'

Népstadion, Budapest
Attendance: 92,000
Referee: Giorgio Bernardi (Italy)

Hungary	England

GK	1	Gyula Grosics
RB	2	Jenő Buzánszky
LB	3	Mihály Lantos
DM	4	József Bozsik
CB	5	Gyula Lóránt
CB	6	József Zakariás
RW	7	József Tóth
FW	8	Sándor Kocsis
AM	9	Nándor Hidegkuti
FW	10	Ferenc Puskás (c)
LW	11	Zoltán Czibor
Manager:
Gusztáv Sebes

GK	1	Gil Merrick
RB	2	Ron Staniforth
LB	3	Roger Byrne
RH	4	Billy Wright (c)
CB	5	Syd Owen
LH	6	Jimmy Dickinson
RW	7	Peter Harris
IR	8	Jackie Sewell
CF	9	Bedford Jezzard
IL	10	Ivor Broadis
LW	11	Tom Finney
Manager:
Walter Winterbottom

== Long-term influences ==
The result confirmed what many in the English football world had suspected after the 6–3 defeat at Wembley: that England were no longer a major footballing force at the time, and that the English game needed to look to the continent for tactical and training advances.

== See also ==
- Wolverhampton Wanderers F.C. v Budapest Honvéd FC
