= Jenő Buzánszky =

Hungarian football player and manager (1925–2015)

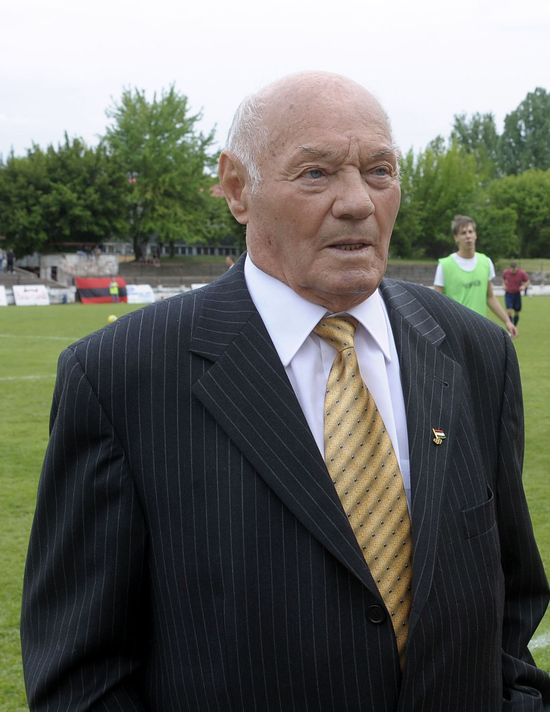
- Buzánszky in 2010

Personal information
- Date of birth: 4 May 1925
- Place of birth: Újdombóvár, Hungary
- Date of death: 11 January 2015 (aged 89)
- Place of death: Esztergom, Hungary
- Position: Defender

Youth career
- 1941–1946: Dombóvári Vasutas

Senior career*
| Years | Team | Apps | (Gls) |
| 1946–1947 | Pécsi Vasutas SK | ? | (?) |
| 1947–1960 | Dorogi FC | 274 | (13) |

International career
| 1950–1956 | Hungary | 48 | (0) |

Managerial career
- 1961–1965: Dorogi AC
- 1965–1968: Esztergomi Vasas
- 1968–1969: Dorogi AC
- 1969–1970: Esztergomi Vasas
- 1970–1971: Fősped Szállítók
- 1971–1978: Dorogi AC
Medal record
Representing Hungary
Olympic Games
| Gold medal – first place | 1952 Helsinki |
FIFA World Cup
| Runner-up | 1954 Switzerland |
- * Club domestic league appearances and goals

Jenő Buzánszky (4 May 1925 – 11 January 2015) was a Hungarian football player and coach. He played as a right back for Hungary and during the 1950s he was a member of the legendary squad known as the Golden Team. Other members of the team included Ferenc Puskás, Zoltán Czibor, Sándor Kocsis, József Bozsik and Nándor Hidegkuti. He was the only member of the team not to play for either Honvéd or MTK Hungária FC. After 274 league games he retired as a player and became a coach. In 1996, he became a deputy chairman of the Hungarian Football Federation.

Buzánszky made his debut for Hungary on 12 November 1950 in a 1–1 draw with Bulgaria. He subsequently played 48 times for Hungary and as one of the legendary Mighty Magyars, he helped Hungary become Olympic Champions in 1952 and become Central European Champions in 1953. He also played in the Hungary team that defeated England twice. During the 1954 World Cup he played for Hungary in all five games. He died after a long illness on 11 January 2015, aged 89. He was the last surviving member of the Mighty Magyars team.

== Honours ==
Hungary

- Olympic Champions
  - 1952
- Central European Champions
  - 1953
- World Cup
  - Runner-up: 1954
