= Golden Team =

1950s Hungary national football team

Medal record

Olympic Games
Gold medal – first place	1952 Helsinki	Team

World Cup
Silver medal – second place	1954 Switzerland	Team

Central European International Cup
Gold medal – first place	1948–53 Central Europe	Team

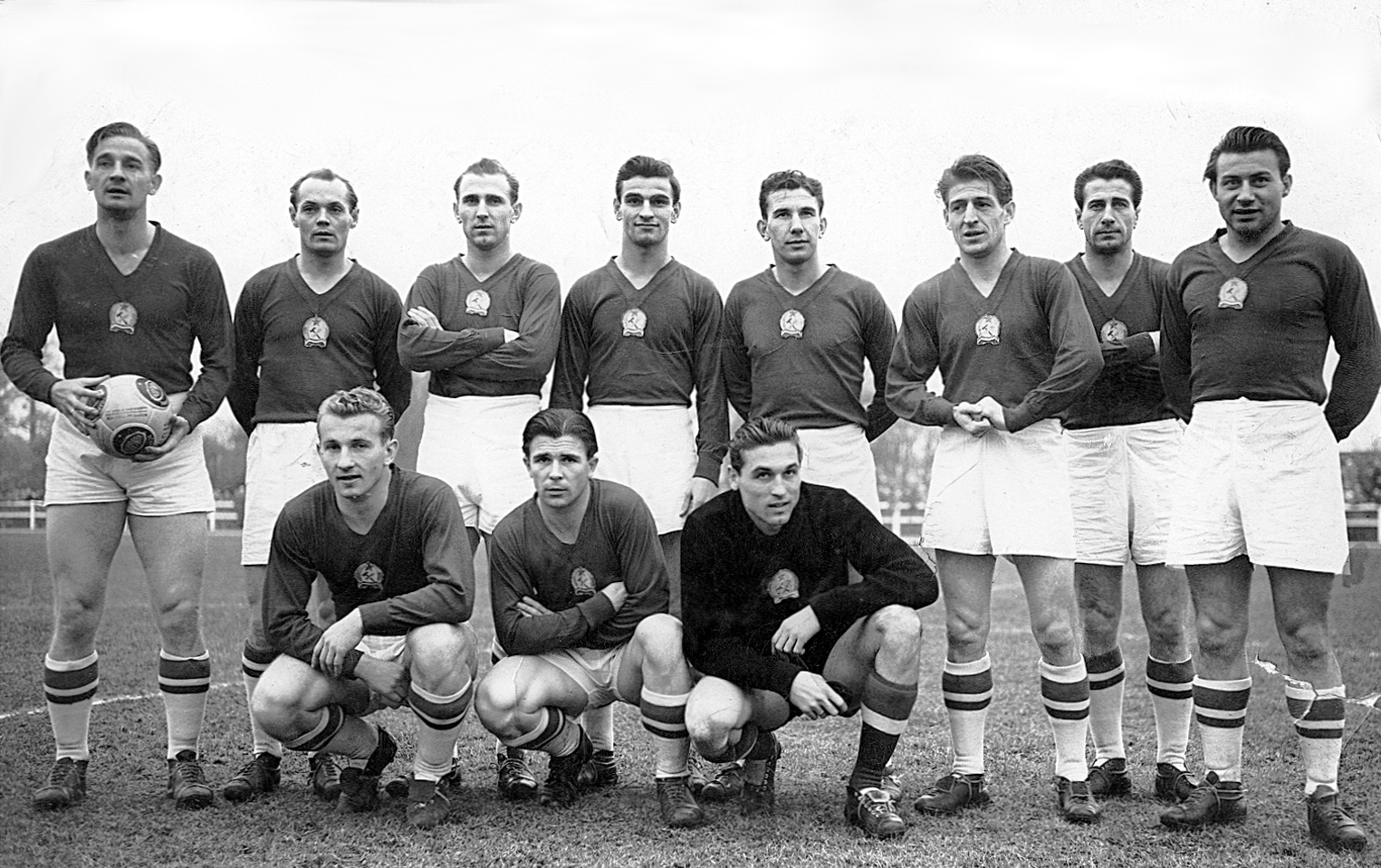
The Golden Team in 1953 front row: Mihály Lantos, Ferenc Puskás, Gyula Grosics back row: Gyula Lóránt, Jenő Buzánszky, Nándor Hidegkuti, Sándor Kocsis, József Zakariás, Zoltán Czibor, József Bozsik, László Budai

The Golden Team (Hungarian: Aranycsapat, pronounced [ɒrɒɲt͡ʃɒpɒt]) refers to the Hungary national football team of the 1950s. It is associated with several notable matches, including the quarter-final ("Battle of Berne") against Brazil, semi-final (against Uruguay) and final of the 1954 FIFA World Cup. The team inflicted notable defeats on then-footballing world powers Uruguay, Soviet Union, England, West Germany, Brazil and Italy before the 1956 Hungarian Revolution caused the breakup of the side. The Golden Team was also known by different nicknames, such as the "Mighty Magyars", the "Magical Magyars", and the "Magnificent Magyars".

Between 1950 and 1956, the team played 69 games, recorded 58 victories, 10 draws, and is generally considered to have suffered only one defeat, in the 1954 World Cup final against West Germany. During this process, they scored 436 goals. Under the Elo rating system, they achieved the second highest rating recorded by a national side (2233 points, achieved on 30 June 1954, only bettered in 2026 by Spain winning the 2026 FIFA World Cup after a world record 38 match unbeaten streak). In 2016, the BBC listed the team as the best international football team ever in football history.

The team is generally credited for successfully implementing an early form of "Total Football", later used effectively by the Dutch in the 1970s. The team is also generally recognized for introducing new, scientific coaching and tactical innovations, which were subsequently adopted throughout the game. The team's success became a subject of national pride in a period of oppression by the Communist regime imposed on Hungary by the Soviet Union. In this period, any "nationalistic" or even patriotic expression was strongly disapproved of, since these were considered being against the internationalist ideal of the ruling Hungarian Working People's Party. The team's success has been cited as an example of how national pride remained linked to sport in Sovietised Hungary, despite the Communist regime's suspicion of nationalism.

== Key people ==
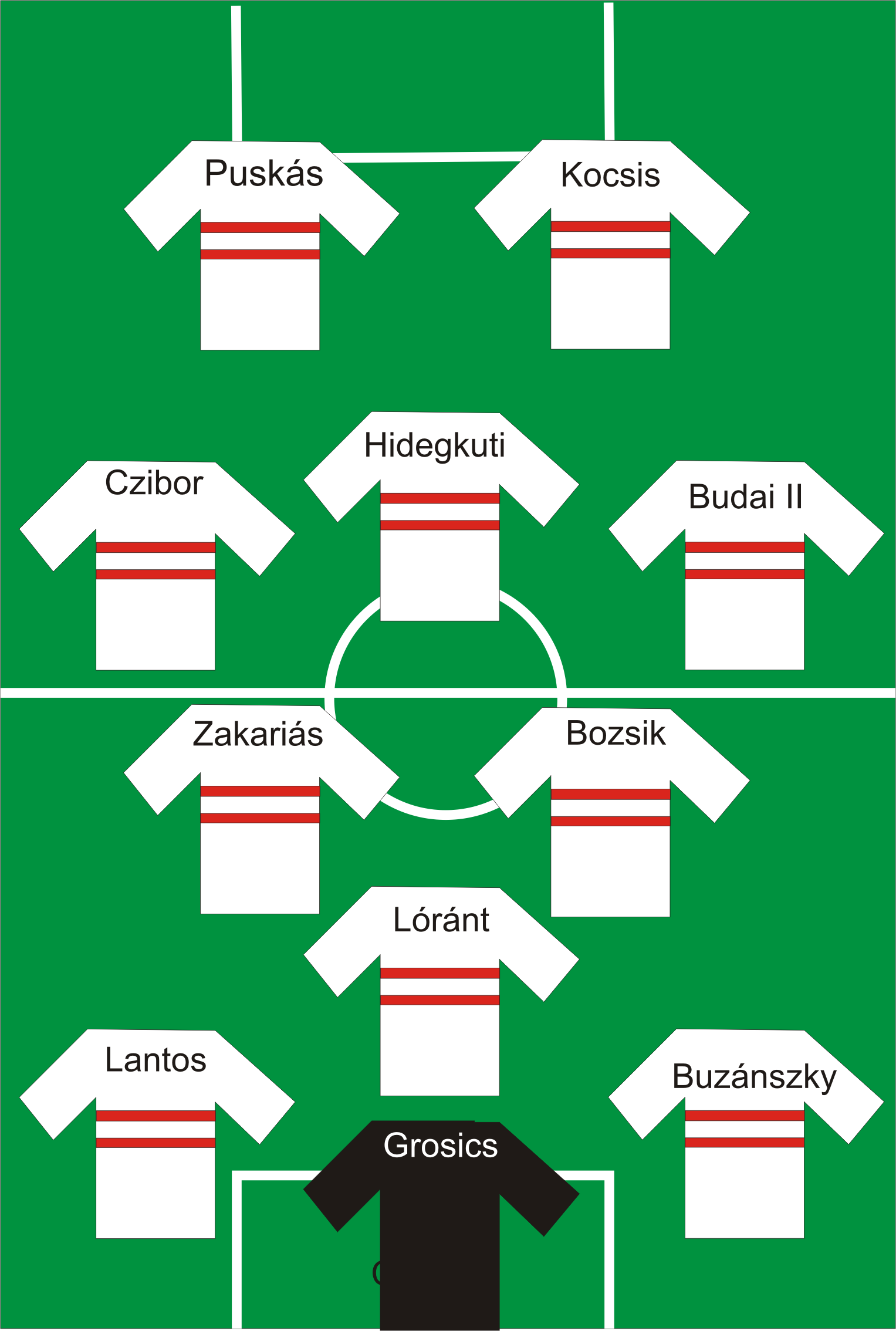
The famous 2-3-3-2 formation employed by the side

The team was built around a core of six key players: forwards Ferenc Puskás, Sándor Kocsis and Zoltán Czibor, defensive midfielder József Bozsik, and goalkeeper Gyula Grosics, all Kispest Honvéd players, as well as MTK offensive midfielder Nándor Hidegkuti. The manager of the team was Gusztáv Sebes, who had been a trade union organizer in Budapest and pre-war Paris at Renault car factories, and was therefore accorded a political clean bill of health to run affairs by the Deputy Sports Minister.

Sebes can be credited with three key innovations. Firstly, he implemented fitness regimes for his players, as well as a club-like policy at international level to give impetus to regular practice sessions. Secondly, he was responsible for the tactical concept of a deep-lying centre forward. At the time, the majority of footballing sides adopted the WM formation, where the centre forward spearheaded an attack line of 3 forwards and 2 wingers. Sebes's tactic was to withdraw the centre forward back to the midfield, as well as dropping the wingers back to the midfield when necessary. This effectively created an extremely flexible 3–2–3–2 formation, allowing the team to quickly switch between attack and defense. The tactic also drew defenders out of position, as centre halves used to man-marking a centre forward would follow the deep-lying centre forward back to the midfield. Thirdly, Sebes encouraged his players to be versatile – the ideal would be for any of his players to be able to play in any position. This was a revolutionary idea – most players were used to playing in one specific position. This was an early form of Total Football. Ferenc Puskas commented, "When we attacked, everyone attacked, and in defence it was the same. We were the prototype for Total Football."

Finally, the influence of Jimmy Hogan on Sebes and the team cannot be underestimated. The then president of the Hungarian Football Association, Sandor Barcs, said: "Jimmy Hogan taught us everything we know about football". and Sebes himself said of Hogan, "We played football as Jimmy Hogan taught us. When our football history is told, his name should be written in gold letters".

== Notable matches ==
=== 1952 Olympic Games (Yugoslavia vs. Hungary) ===
The Hungarians arrived at the 1952 Summer Olympics unbeaten for two years. The team easily defeated opponents in the preliminary rounds, before meeting the 1948 defending Olympic champions, Sweden, in the semi-finals. Hungary demolished Sweden 6–0 to set up a final against Yugoslavia. Goals from Ferenc Puskás and Zoltán Czibor ensured a 2–0 victory and the Olympic gold for Hungary.

=== 1953 Central European Championship (Italy vs. Hungary) ===
Hungary took part in the 1948-53 Central European International Cup, a nations cup for teams from Central Europe and the forerunner of the European championship. The competing teams included Austria, Czechoslovakia, Italy and Switzerland. Hungary eased their way to a final against Italy on 17 May 1953, which they won 3–0 with a goal from Nándor Hidegkuti and two from Puskás.

=== 1953 "Match of the Century" (England vs. Hungary) ===
A friendly match was arranged for 25 November 1953 against England. England had never been defeated on home soil by a team from outside the British Isles (they lost to the Republic of Ireland in 1949), and the FA were complacent – as the inventors of the game, they were assured that their players were technically and tactically superior to any other countries. At the time, England were ranked as the 3rd best team in the world and Hungary were ranked as the best team in the world. The game was eagerly anticipated; the British Press reported it as "the Match of the Century".

The game was played in front of 105,000 in Wembley Stadium. Hungary scored in the first minute, and after 27 minutes they were 4–1 up. The final score was 6–3, with a hat-trick from Hidegkuti, two goals from Puskás and one from Bozsik. It was a footballing lesson that sent shockwaves through English football, and which ultimately caused English clubs to adapt more modern coaching and tactics.

=== 1954 Hungary 7 England 1 ===
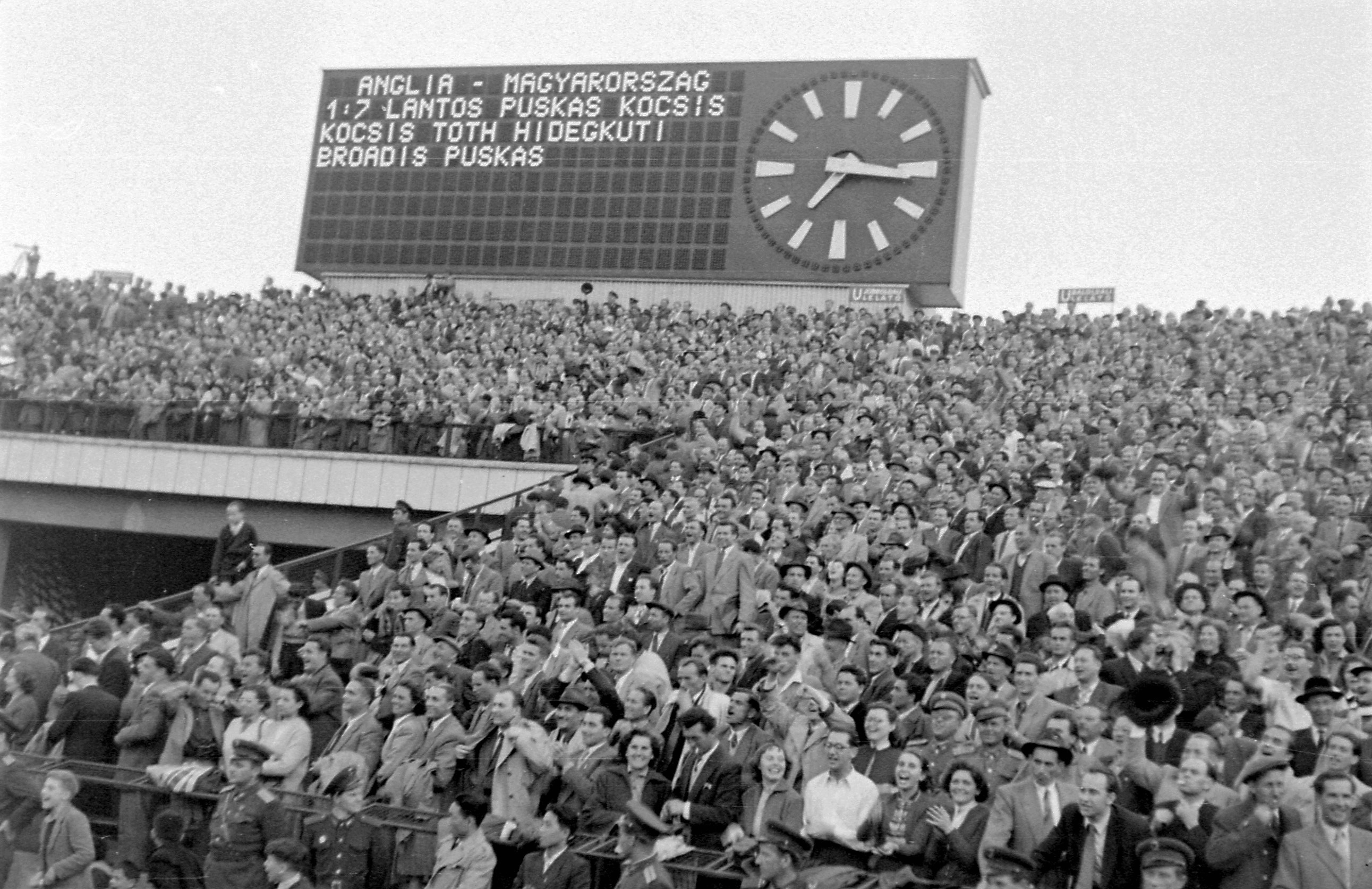
The Hungarian crowd cheers following the conclusion of England's heaviest ever defeat (1–7)

England were anxious for revenge after the defeat at Wembley, and a return match was scheduled in Budapest for 23 May 1954, three weeks before the start of the 1954 World Cup. Any hopes that the Wembley game had been an aberration were immediately dispelled as Hungary won 7–1, inflicting England's heaviest ever defeat that still stands to this day.

=== 1954 World Cup First Round Games ===
Hungary went to the 1954 World Cup in Switzerland as firm favourites; they were unbeaten since 1950, and had issued served notice of their ability with 6–3 and 7–1 thrashings of England. The 16 finalists were assigned to four groups, with each group having four teams in it. Each group contained two seeded teams and two unseeded teams. Only four matches were scheduled for each group, each pitting a seeded team against an unseeded team (this contrasts with a conventional round-robin in which every team plays every other team, which would have resulted in six matches in each group). In a further oddity, extra time would be played if the teams were level after ninety minutes in the group games, with the result being a draw if the scores were still level after 120 minutes.

The top two teams from each group would qualify for the quarter-finals. Hungary shared Group B with Turkey, West Germany and South Korea; Hungary and Turkey were the two seeded sides in the group. Hungary won their opening game against South Korea 9–0, with Kocsis scoring a hat-trick. In the second game, Hungary thrashed West Germany 8–3, with Kocsis scoring another 4 goals; however, fouling on Puskás left him with a hairline fracture of the ankle which left him unavailable for selection for the quarter-final and semi final stages.

=== 1954 World Cup Quarter-final: "Battle of Berne" (Brazil vs. Hungary 1954) ===
Hungary met Brazil in an eagerly anticipated quarter final; both sides had a reputation for open, attacking football. The Brazilians had lost the last and deciding match of the 1950 World Cup to Uruguay, and were anxious to reach the final again. The game was notable for the number of cynical fouls performed by both sides rather than as an exhibition of footballing technique; Hungary took a 2–0 lead after 7 minutes, and after that the game descended into a series of fouls, free kicks and fights on the pitch resulting in three dismissals. The game ended 4–2 to Hungary. Fighting continued off the pitch in the tunnels and in the players' dressing rooms. The game's English referee Arthur Ellis commented: "I thought it was going to be the greatest game I'd ever see. I was on top of the world. Whether politics and religion had something to do with it I don't know, but they behaved like animals. It was a disgrace. It was a horrible match. In today's climate so many players would have been sent off the game would have been abandoned. My only thought was that I was determined to finish it."

=== 1954 World Cup Semi-final (Uruguay vs. Hungary) ===
Uruguay were the defending champions, and had never lost a World Cup match in their history, winning both tournaments they had previously entered. Hungary were without Puskás, but still managed to take the lead via Zoltán Czibor. Uruguay rallied but were unable to even the scores before half-time. Almost immediately after the restart, Nándor Hidegkuti scored a second goal for Hungary. Uruguay's unbeaten World Cup record seemed to be over, but they still had most of the second half to recover.

The champions were not going to give up without a fight, and spent much of the remainder of the match launching attack after attack at the Hungarian defence. With a quarter of an hour to play Juan Hohberg scored for Uruguay; Hungary defended desperately until the 86th minute, when Hohberg scored his second to force extra time. Appearing to have much more energy than their opponents, Hungary retook the lead midway through the second period of extra-time when Sándor Kocsis headed home from close range; Kocsis scored again four minutes from injury time. Uruguay were beaten 4–2, their first ever World Cup loss, while Hungary went on to their second World Cup final. The game was in direct contrast to the quarter-final between Hungary and Brazil; both Hungary and Uruguay had played attractive, attacking football in what was arguably one of the finest displays of football in a World Cup.

=== 1954 World Cup Final: "The Miracle of Bern" (West Germany vs. Hungary) ===
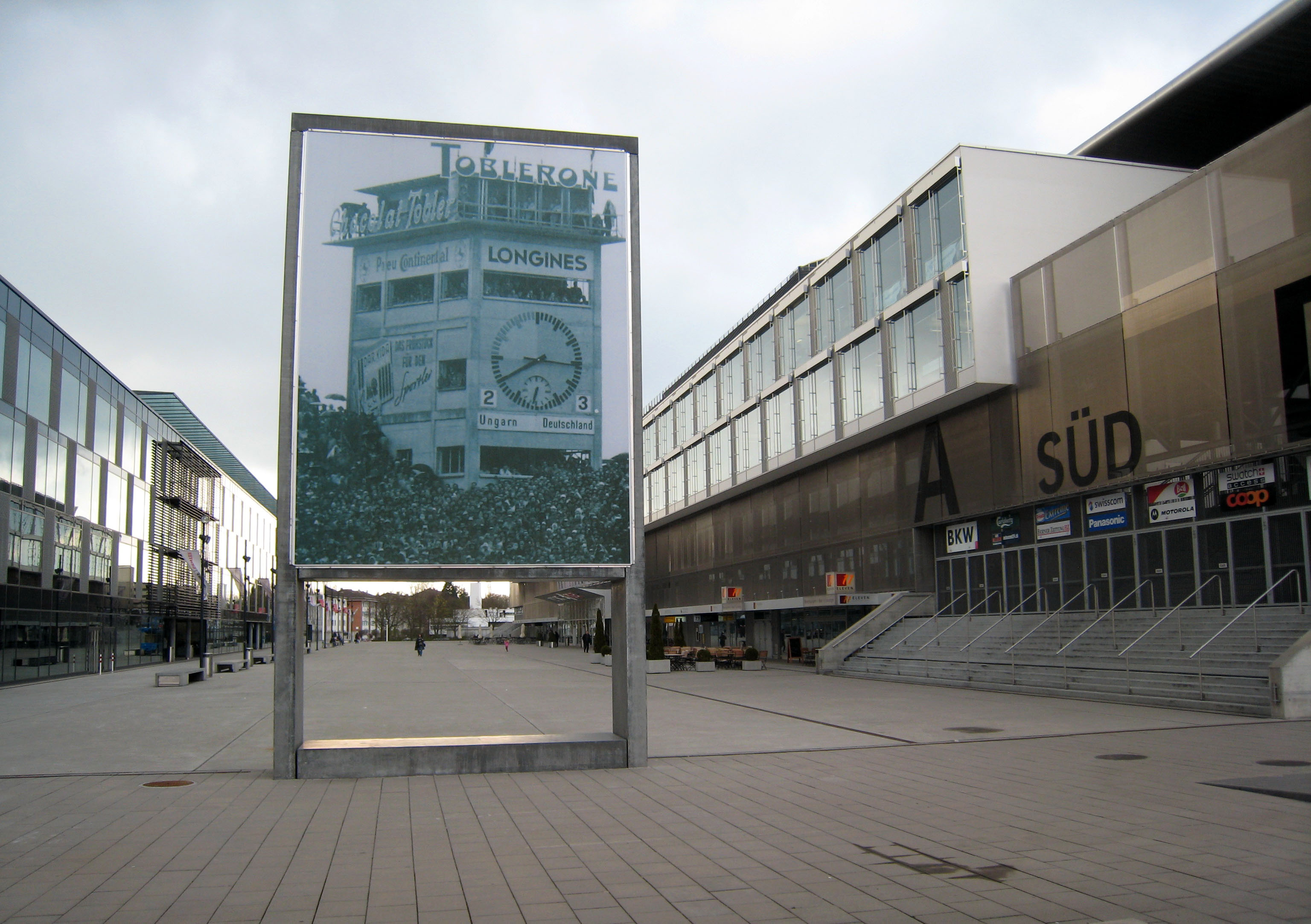
A well-known photograph of the 1954 final is installed in front of the Wankdorf's successor stadium, the Stade de Suisse.

The final was between Hungary and West Germany. Hungary were in their second World Cup Final (their 1938 team had lost to Italy 4–2 in Paris); in addition, they had a record of 34 wins, 6 draws, and 1 defeat since August 1949, and were unbeaten in their last 32 matches. Hungary had beaten West Germany 8–3 in a first-round game. The only issue the Hungarians faced was the ankle injury sustained to Puskás in the same game, from which he had not fully recovered – Sebes still took the decision to play him.

Hungary took an early lead in the 6th minute, with a goal from Puskás. Two minutes later, Czibor made it 2–0 to Hungary. However, the Germans rallied, and swiftly pulled the score back to 2–1 through Max Morlock. In the 18th minute, the Germans drew level from a corner kick; the goal was scored by Helmut Rahn. In the second half, Hungary poured forward looking to retake the lead, but their attempts were repeatedly foiled by the German defence, with goalkeeper Toni Turek pulling off several fine saves.

With six minutes left and the score still 2–2, Helmut Rahn scored West Germany's third goal. Two minutes before the end, Puskás appeared to equalise, but he was ruled off-side. The match ended Hungary's unbeaten run in one of the biggest upsets in the history of football; West Germany won 3–2 in the "Miracle of Bern". There were three controversial incidents in the final, each favouring the Germans; Hungarian goalkeeper Grosics was allegedly obstructed for the second German goal, Puskás apparently equalised in the 89th minute but was deemed to be offside, and there was an alleged foul on Kocsis in the penalty area in the final minute of the game.

=== 1955 Scotland 2 Hungary 4 ===
On 8 December 1954, Scotland hosted Hungary at Hampden Park in a friendly match, before a crowd of 113,000. Scotland were determined not to be humiliated as England had been a year earlier, and attempted to take the game to the Hungarians in a display of counterattacking football. This made for an open, attractive game with plenty of goals; Hungary scored on 20 minutes through Bozsik, and Hidegkuti made it 2–0 six minutes later. Scotland rallied and pulled one back on 36 minutes through Tommy Ring, but Sandor made it 3–1 to Hungary just before halftime.

The second half continued in the same vein, with Partick Thistle winger John Mackenzie constantly beating Hungary full back Mihály Lantos. Bobby Johnstone scored a second goal for Scotland on 46 minutes, and only poor finishing prevented Scotland from equalising. The home side continued to press forward, but were caught on a counter break right at the end of the match when Kocsis scored to make the final score 2–4 to Hungary. It was the closest any team had come to beating Hungary in a friendly competition since 1950. Afterwards, Puskas complimented the excellent work of Mackenzie, stating that he had "never seen wing play of such a high standard".

=== 1956 Soviet Union 0 Hungary 1 ===
On 23 September 1956, the Soviet Union played Hungary in a friendly game at the Lenin Central Stadium in Moscow, before a crowd of 102,000. The Soviet Union were unbeaten at home, and were generally regarded as the natural successors to the Hungarians as the world's premier footballing side. In addition, the Soviet team and players were regarded as ideals of socialist principles by senior Communist authorities, who expected the Soviet Union to win comfortably, as befitting the senior member of the Eastern Bloc. However, a single goal from Zoltán Czibor ended the Soviet Union's unbeaten home record; the result did little to encourage good relations between the two countries, and was a minor contributing factor to a wave of patriotic fervour that resulted in the Hungarian Revolution of 1956.

== Demise ==
Hungary continued to dominate international football; between July 1954 and February 1956, Hungary played a further 19 games, winning 16, drawing 3 and losing none. From 1950 until their demise in 1956 the team played a total of 69 games, winning 58, drawing 10 and losing just once, and scored 436 goals. Despite this, manager Sebes was sacked in June 1956, and was replaced by Márton Bukovi; however, Sebes remained President of the Hungarian Olympic Committee from 1948 to 1960, and was also Vice President of UEFA from 1954 to 1960.

The majority of the team played for Budapest Honvéd, who entered the 1956–57 European Cup and were drawn against Athletic Bilbao in the first round. Honvéd lost the away leg 3–2, but before the home leg could be played, the Hungarian Revolution erupted in Budapest. The players decided against going back to Hungary and arranged for the return with Athletic to be played at Heysel Stadium in Brussels, Belgium. With a 3–3 draw in the return game, Honvéd were eliminated 6–5 on aggregate, and the Hungarian players were left in limbo. They summoned their families from Budapest, and despite opposition from FIFA and the Hungarian football authorities, they organised a fundraising tour of Italy, Portugal, Spain, and Brazil. After returning to Europe, the players parted ways.

Kocsis and Czibor moved to Spain to play for Barcelona. Puskás emigrated to Spain to play for Real Madrid, was naturalized before the 1962 FIFA World Cup and earned caps for Spain. Hidegkuti returned to Hungary as a player and later became manager of MTK Budapest FC before emigrating to successfully manage clubs in Italy, Poland and Egypt. Bozsik also returned in Hungary, and later becoming the manager of several Hungarian teams. They, as well as others who chose to return to Hungary, were among the few remnants of the Golden Team to take part in the following World Cup, in Sweden. Sebes also managed several Hungarian clubs in the 1960s (Ujpesti Dozsa, Budapest Honvéd FC and Diosgyori VTK) with moderate success.

== Historic significance ==
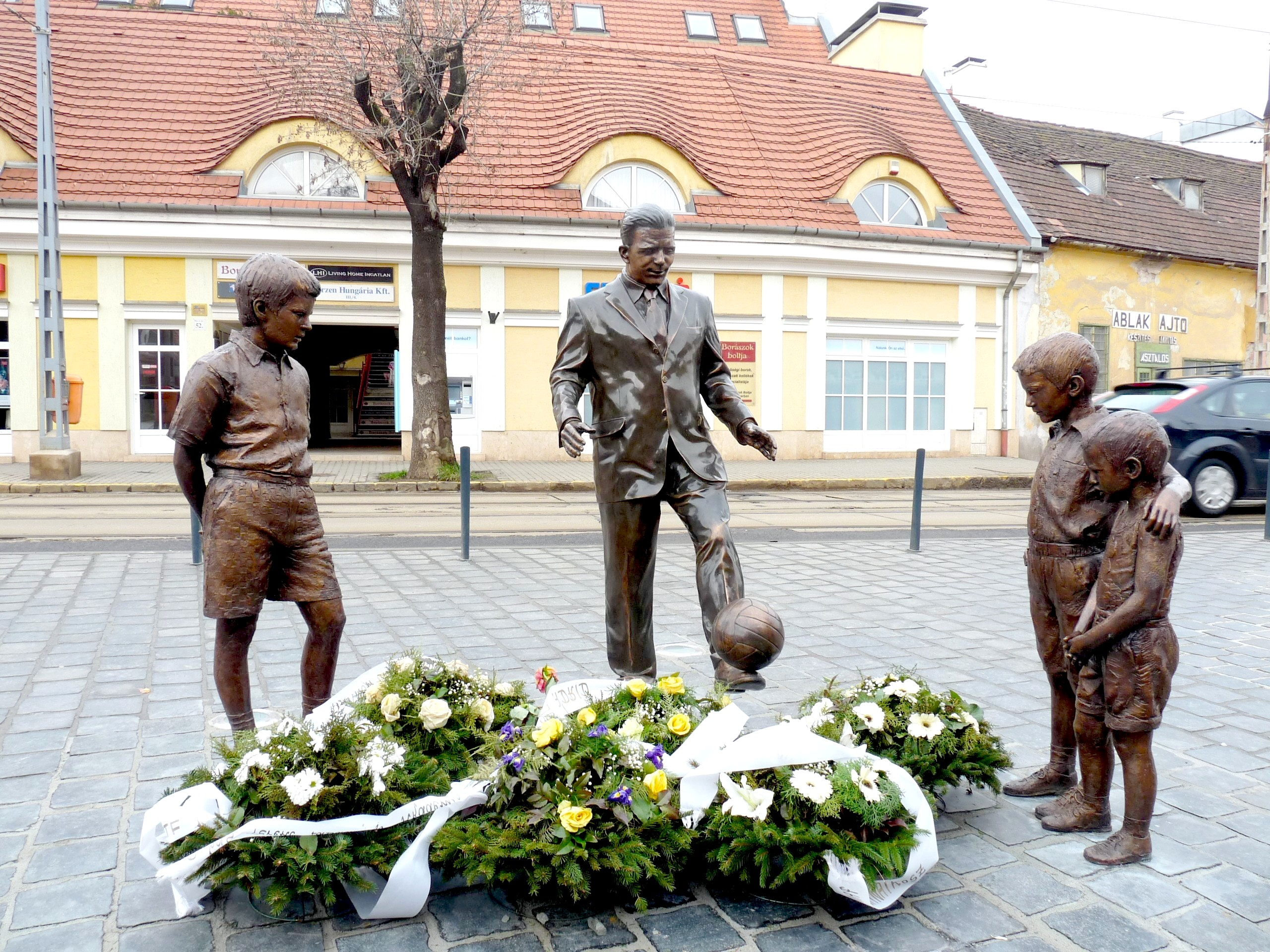
Statue of Ferenc Puskás in Óbuda.

The historical significance of the team lay in three areas; the introduction of new tactics, the concept of using a core set of well trained players used to playing as a team, and the idea that each player could play in any position if necessary. The importance of Gusztáv Sebes and the influence of Jimmy Hogan cannot be underestimated. The tactics of Sebes – especially the concept of a deep lying centre forward – revolutionised a game where the majority of club and international sides had played the WM formation for the previous 20 years. The introduction and success of the Hungarian 3–2–3–2 formation led other managers and countries to experiment, with the 3–2–3–2 eventually evolving into the 4–2–4 formation.

Sebes's idea of using a core set of players, drawn from just a handful of clubs, was a new idea that was critical to the success of the team. Most national teams were selected on the concept of picking the best players, not the best team; England famously had a selection committee that selected the team for each game, with little or no sense of continuity. By using players who were familiar with each other's strengths at a club level, Sebes introduced a sense of continuity at a national level – something no other nation had at the time. The Soviet Union adopted this approach throughout the 1960s, with success at a European level; England won the World Cup in 1966 with a core of players from one club, West Ham United. Sebes also demanded rigorous training and standards of physical fitness from his players, as well as good tactic awareness – again, these were areas that many national sides of the time neglected. As a consequence, the Hungarian side were able to outrun, outpass and outplay their opposition.

Finally, Sebes's successful implementation of Jimmy Hogan's theory that every player should be able to play in all positions was critical to the success of the team; previously, each player in a team was assigned a specific position or role, usually marking a specific opposition player. The Hungarian tactic of players constantly changing roles and positions could only be introduced by using a core set of talented players who were used to playing together at both a club and national level for a period of time. It would be nearly 20 years before the Netherlands national team of the 1970s utilised the same approach with their concept of Total Football.

== All-time team highs and lows ==
The following is a list of national football teams ranked by the highest Elo rating they ever reached. The table also includes the highest ranking as well as the lowest rating and ranking reached by each nation. The team that has achieved the highest rank in each confederation is shown in color.

Rank	Nation	High rating (rank) (Note: The ranking in parentheses is that at the time the highest rating was reached.)	High rating date (Note: The date given is when the highest or lowest rating was first reached.)	High rank (first,last year)	Low rating / low rank (Note: The team's indicated lowest ratings and rank may not have coincided in time.)	Low rating date
1	Spain	2290 (1st)	14 Nov 2026	1st (1920,2026)	1800 / 19th	25 Jun 1969
2	Golden Team	2230 (1st)	30 Jun 1954	1st (1952,1960)	1527 / 75th	19 Nov 2003
3	Germany	2223 (1st)	13 Jul 2014	1st (1966,2017)	1639 / 24th	26 Sep 1920
4	England	2216 (1st)	9 Sep 1912	1st (1872,1988)	1790 / 17th	31 Mar 1928
5	Brazil	2195 (1st)	28 Nov 2022	1st (1958,2022)	1813 / 20th	24 Sep 1922
6	Argentina	2159 (1st)	3 Apr 1957	1st (1929,2022)	1751 / 26th	8 Jun 1990
7	Netherlands	2154 (2nd)	12 Jul 2014	1st (1978,2014)	1550 / 53rd	24 Oct 1954
8	France	2137 (1st)	30 May 2001	1st (1984,2018)	1506 / 40th	18 May 1930
9	Italy	2132 (1st)	11 Jun 1939	1st (1952,2006)	1604 / 22nd	29 Aug 1920
10	Uruguay	2108 (1st)	13 Jun 1928	1st (1920,1929)	1635 / 44th	5 Sep 1979
11	Scotland	2104 (1st)	10 Mar 1888	1st (1876,1926)	1600 / 64th	26 Mar 2005
12	Russia (Note: Russia reached its lowest rating as the Russian Empire (after 7 matches) and its highest rating and ranking as the Soviet Union.)	2088 (1st)	23 Jul 1966	1st (1963,1988)	1449 / 48th	14 Sep 1913
13	Belgium	2084 (3rd)	12 Oct 2018	3rd (2018,2019)	1498 / 70th	29 Mar 1936
14	Poland	2083 (2nd)	1 Sep 1974	2nd (1974,1975)	1526 / 61st	26 Aug 1956
15	Denmark	2077 (1st)	25 Jun 1916	1st (1914,1916)	1536 / 61st	24 May 1967
16	Austria	2068 (1st)	31 May 1934	1st (1934)	1550 / 74th	2 Sep 2011
17	Chile	2041 (3rd)	26 Jun 2016	2nd (2016)	1384 / 60th	6 Jul 1916
18	Czech Republic	2037 (1st)	27 Jun 2004	1st (2004,2005)	1670 / 46th	4 Sep 2017
19	Colombia	2035 (5th)	28 Jun 2014	3rd (2016)	1304 / 100th	13 Mar 1957
20	Portugal	2022 (3rd)	28 Jul 1966	2nd (2006)	1619 / 42nd	7 Nov 1962

== International football's highest rated matches ==
The Mighty Magyars feature in three of the top 10 highest rated matches all-time. A list of the 10 matches between teams with the highest combined Elo ratings (the nation's points before the matches are given) as of July 16, 2010.

Rank	Combined points	Nation 1	Elo 1	Nation 2	Elo 2	Score	Date	Occasion	Location
1	4211	Netherlands	2100	Spain	2111	0 : 1	2010-07-11	World Cup F	(South Africa) Johannesburg
2	4161	West Germany	1995	Hungary	2166	3 : 2	1954-07-04	World Cup F	(Switzerland) Bern
3	4157	Netherlands	2050	Brazil	2107	2 : 1	2010-07-02	World Cup QF	(South Africa) Port Elizabeth
4	4148	West Germany	2068	Brazil	2080	0 : 1	1973-06-16	Friendly	(West Germany) Berlin
5	4129	Spain	2085	Germany	2044	1 : 0	2010-07-07	World Cup SF	(South Africa) Durban
6	4119	Brazil	2050	West Germany	2069	1 : 0	1982-03-21	Friendly	(Brazil) Rio de Janeiro
7	4118	Hungary	2108	Brazil	2010	4 : 2	1954-06-27	World Cup QF	(Switzerland) Bern
8	4116	Hungary	2141	Uruguay	1975	4 : 2	1954-06-30	World Cup SF	(Switzerland) Lausanne
9	4113	West Germany	2079	Netherlands	2034	2 : 1	1974-07-07	World Cup F	(West Germany) Munich
10	4108	Brazil	2015	West Germany	2093	1 : 1	1977-06-12	Friendly	(Brazil) Rio de Janeiro

== Results ==
Date	Venue	Opponents	Score	Comp	Hungary scorers	Attendance
1949-05-08	(Hungary) Budapest	Austria	6–1	Central European Cup	Puskás (3), Kocsis, Deák (2)	50,000
1949-06-12	(Hungary) Budapest	Italy	1–1	Central European Cup	Deák	47,000
1949-06-19	(Sweden) Stockholm	Sweden	2–2	Friendly	Kocsis, Budai	38,000
1949-07-10	(Hungary) Debrecen	Poland	8–2	Friendly	Deák (4), Puskás (2), Egresi, Keszthelyi	30,000
1949-10-16	(Austria) Vienna	Austria	4–3	Friendly	Deák (2), Puskás (2)	65,000
1949-10-30	(Hungary) Budapest	Bulgaria	5–0	Friendly	Puskás (2), Deák, Budai, Rudas	36,000
1949-11-20	(Hungary) Budapest	Sweden	5–0	Friendly	Kocsis (3) Puskás, Deák	50,000
1950-04-30	(Hungary) Budapest	Czechoslovakia	5–0	Friendly	Kocsis (2) Puskás (2), Szilágyi	47,000
1950-05-14	(Austria) Vienna	Austria	3–3	Friendly	Kocsis, Puskás, Szilágyi	65,000
1950-06-04	(Poland) Warsaw	Poland	5–2	Friendly	Puskás (2), Szilágyi (3)	60,000
1950-09-24	(Hungary) Budapest	Albania	12–0	Friendly	Puskás (4), Budai (4), Palotás (2), Kocsis (2)	38,000
1950-10-29	(Hungary) Budapest	Austria	4–3	Friendly	Puskás (3), Szilágyi	45,000
1950-11-12	(Bulgaria) Sofia	Bulgaria	1–1	Friendly	Szilágyi	35,000
1951-05-27	(Hungary) Budapest	Poland	6–0	Friendly	Kocsis (2), Sándor, Puskás (2), Czibor	42,000
1951-10-14	(Czechoslovakia) Ostrava	Czechoslovakia	2–1	Friendly	Kocsis (2)	45,000
1951-11-18	(Hungary) Budapest	Finland	8–0	Friendly	Hidegkuti (3), Kocsis (2), Czibor, Puskás (2)	40,000
1952-05-18	(Hungary) Budapest	East Germany	5–0	Friendly	Hidegkuti (2), Szusza, Kocsis, Sándor	38,000
1952-06-15	(Poland) Warsaw	Poland	5–1	Friendly	Kocsis (2), Puskás (2), Hidegkuti	50,000
1952-06-22	(Finland) Helsinki	Finland	6–1	Friendly	Puskás, Bozsik, Kocsis (3), Palotás	25,000
1952-07-15	(Finland) Turku	Romania	2–1	1952 Olympics	Czibor, Kocsis	14,000
1952-07-21	(Finland) Helsinki	Italy	3–0	1952 Olympics	Palotás (2), Kocsis	20,000
1952-07-24	(Finland) Kotka	Turkey	7–1	1952 Olympics	Palotás, Kocsis (2), Lantos, Puskás (2), Bozsik	20,000
1952-07-28	(Finland) Helsinki	Sweden	6–0	1952 Olympics	Puskás, Palotás, Lindh (o.g.), Kocsis (2), Hidegkuti	35,000
1952-08-02	(Finland) Helsinki	(Socialist Federal Republic of Yugoslavia) Yugoslavia	2–0	1952 Olympics	Puskás, Czibor	60,000
1952-09-20	(Switzerland) Bern	Switzerland	4–2	Central European Cup	Puskás (2), Kocsis, Hidegkuti	35,000
1952-10-19	(Hungary) Budapest	Czechoslovakia	5–0	Friendly	Hidegkuti, Egresi, Kocsis (3)	48,000
1953-04-26	(Hungary) Budapest	Austria	1–1	Friendly	Czibor	44,000
1953-05-17	(Italy) Rome	Italy	3–0	Central European Cup	Hidegkuti, Puskás (2)	90,000
1953-07-05	(Sweden) Stockholm	Sweden	4–2	Friendly	Puskás, Budai, Kocsis, Hidegkuti	40,000
1953-10-04	(Bulgaria) Sofia	Bulgaria	1–1	Friendly	Szilágyi	45,000
1953-10-04	(Czechoslovakia) Prague	Czechoslovakia	5–1	Friendly	Csordás (2), Hidegkuti, M. Tóth, Puskás	50,000
1953-10-11	(Austria) Vienna	Austria	3–2	Friendly	Csordás, Hidegkuti (2)	65,000
1953-11-15	(Hungary) Budapest	Sweden	2–2	Friendly	Palotás, Czibor	80,000
1953-11-25	(England) London	England	6–3	Friendly	Hidegkuti (3), Puskás (2), Bozsik	105,000
1954-02-12	(Egypt) Cairo	Egypt	3–0	Friendly	Puskás (2), Hidegkuti	28,000
1954-04-11	(Austria) Vienna	Austria	1–0	Friendly	Happel (o.g.)	65,000
1954-05-23	(Hungary) Budapest	England	7–1	Friendly	Lantos, Puskás (2), Kocsis (2), M. Tóth, Hidegkuti	92,000
1954-06-17	(Switzerland) Zurich	South Korea	9–0	1954 World Cup	Puskás (2), Lantos, Kocsis (3), Czibor, Palotás (2)	15,000
1954-06-20	(Switzerland) Basel	West Germany	8–3	1954 World Cup	Kocsis (4), Puskás, Hidegkuti (2), J. Tóth	53,000
1954-06-27	(Switzerland) Bern	Brazil	4–2	1954 World Cup	Hidegkuti, Kocsis (2), Lantos	60,000
1954-06-30	(Switzerland) Lausanne	Uruguay	4–2 (a.e.t.)	1954 World Cup	Czibor, Hidegkuti, Kocsis (2)	50,000
1954-07-04	(Switzerland) Bern	West Germany	2–3	1954 World Cup	Puskás, Czibor	65,000
1954-09-19	(Hungary) Budapest	Romania	5–1	Friendly	Kocsis (2), Hidegkuti (2), Budai	93,000
1954-09-19	(Soviet Union) Moscow	Soviet Union	1–1	Friendly	Kocsis	85,000
1954-10-10	(Hungary) Budapest	Switzerland	3–0	Friendly	Kocsis (2), Bozsik	94,000
1954-10-24	(Hungary) Budapest	Czechoslovakia	4–1	Friendly	Kocsis (3), Sándor	93,000
1954-11-14	(Hungary) Budapest	Austria	4–1	Friendly	Kocsis, Czibor, Sándor, Palotás	94,000
1954-12-08	(Scotland) Glasgow	Scotland	4–2	Friendly	Kocsis, Hidegkuti, Bozsik, Sándor	134,000
1955-04-24	(Austria) Vienna	Austria	2–2	Central European Cup	Hidegkuti, Fenyvesi	65,000
1955-05-08	(Norway) Oslo	Norway	5–0	Friendly	Puskás, Kocsis, Palotás (2), Tichy	34,000
1955-05-11	(Sweden) Stockholm	Sweden	7–3	Friendly	Puskás (2), Kocsis (3), Hidegkuti, Szojka	40,000
1955-05-15	(Denmark) Copenhagen	Denmark	6–0	Friendly	Kocsis (2), Sándor (3), Palotás	41,000
1955-05-19	(Finland) Helsinki	Finland	9–1	Friendly	Palotás (3), Puskás, Tichy (2), Csordás (2), J. Tóth	30,000
1955-05-29	(Hungary) Budapest	Scotland	3–1	Friendly	Kocsis, Hidegkuti, Fenyvesi	100,000
1955-09-17	(Hungary) Budapest	Switzerland	5–4	Central European Cup	Puskás (2), Kocsis, Machos (2)	45,000
1955-09-25	(Hungary) Budapest	Soviet Union	1–1	Friendly	Puskás	103,000
1955-10-02	(Czechoslovakia) Prague	Czechoslovakia	3–1	Central European Cup	Kocsis, Tichy, Czibor	50,000
1955-10-16	(Hungary) Budapest	Austria	6–1	Central European Cup	Kocsis, Puskás, Czibor (2), Tichy, J. Tóth	104,000
1955-11-13	(Hungary) Budapest	Sweden	4–2	Friendly	Puskás, Tichy, Czibor (2)	90,000
1955-11-27	(Hungary) Budapest	Italy	2–0	Central European Cup	Puskás, J. Tóth	103,000
1956-06-03	(Belgium) Brussels	Belgium	4–4	Friendly	Puskás, Kocsis (2), Budai	75,000
1956-09-23	(Soviet Union) Moscow	Soviet Union	1–0	Friendly	Czibor	105,000

== Records and statistics ==
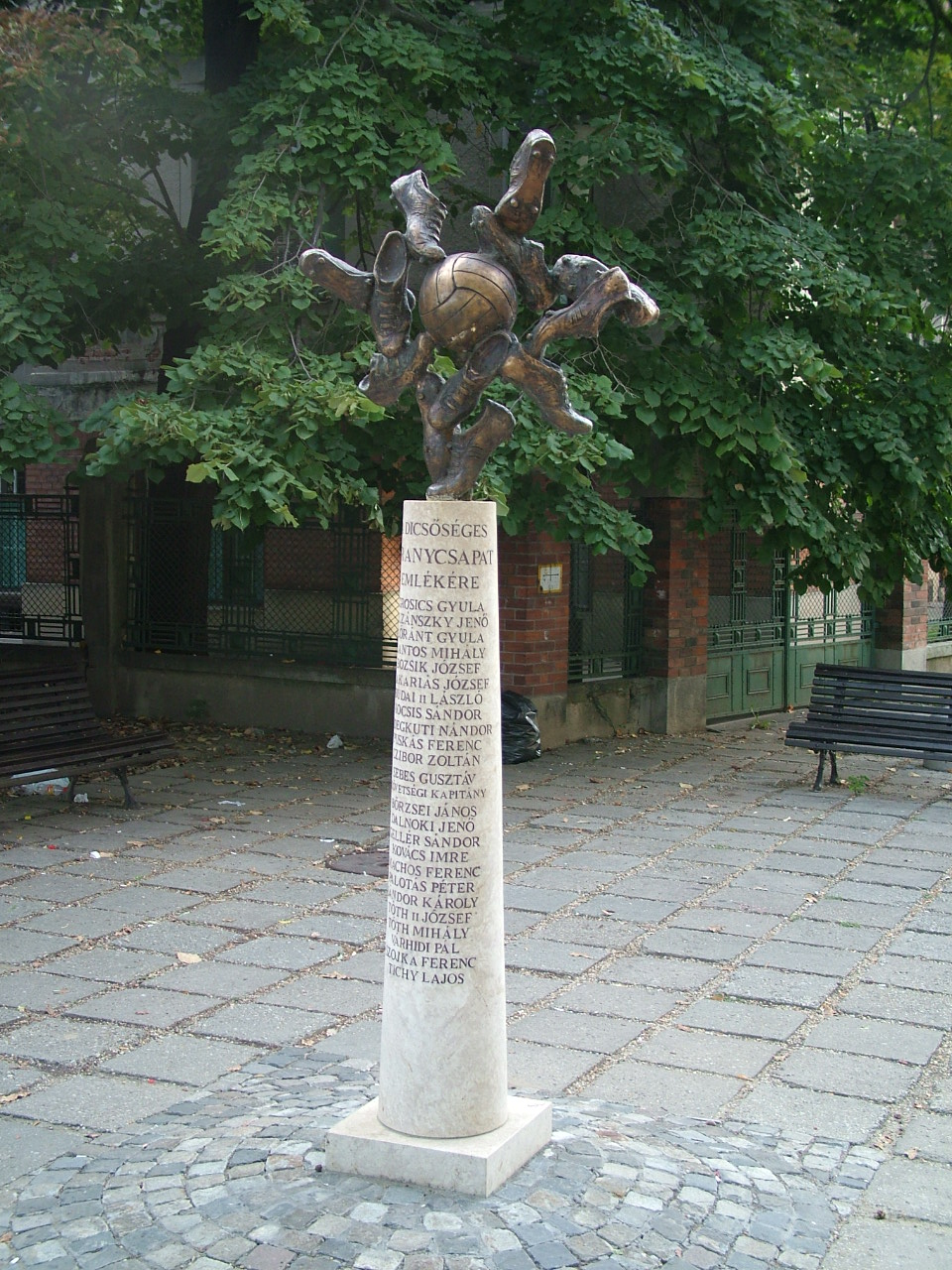
Memorial of the Aranycsapat in Szeged, Hungary

- World Record: (June 4, 1950 – February 19, 1956) 42 victories, 7 draws, 1 defeat ("Miracle of Bern") – 91.0% winning percentage ratio.
  - Team Record (June 4, 1950 – July 3, 1954) 32 game undefeated narrative.
- World Record: most consecutive games scoring at least one goal: 73 games (April 10, 1949 – June 16, 1957).
- World Record: longest time undefeated in 20th and 21st centuries: 4 years 1 month (June 4, 1950 – July 4, 1954).
- World Record: most collaborative goals scored between two starting players (Ferenc Puskás & Sándor Kocsis) on same national side (159 goals).
- World Record: Highest rating ever attained in the sport's history using the Elo rating system for national teams with 2230 points on June 30, 1954.

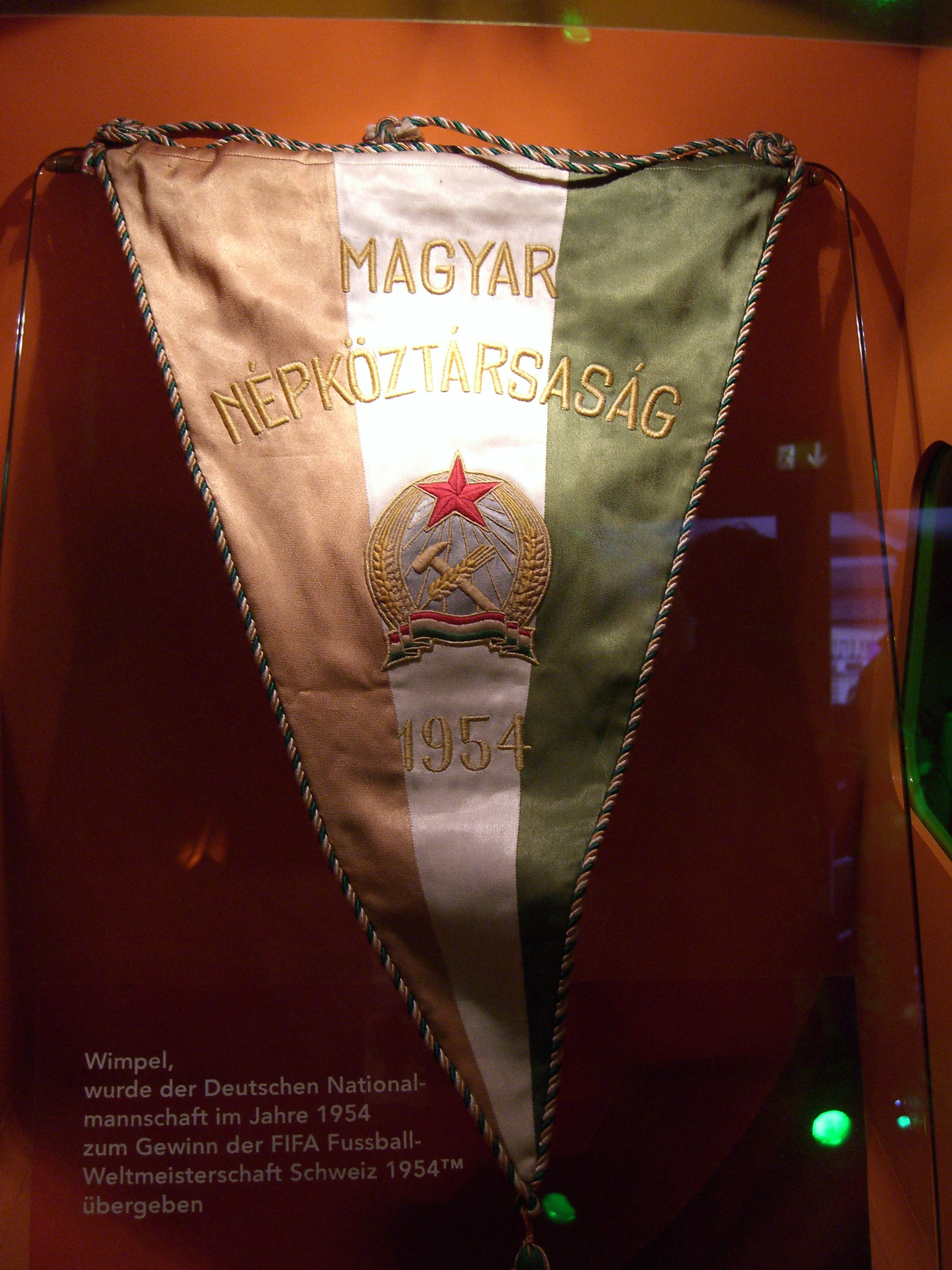
Hungarian pennant for the 1954 World Cup.

- 20th Century Record: Hungary manager Gusztáv Sebes holds the highest ratio of victories per game past 30 matches with 82.58% (49 wins, 11, draws, 6 defeats).
- 20th Century Record: Most International Goals: Ferenc Puskás (84 goals).
- World Cup Record: 27 goals scored in a single World Cup finals tournament.
- World Cup Record: 5.4 goals-per-match in a single World Cup finals tournament.
- World Cup Record: +17 goal differential in a single World Cup finals tournament.
- World Cup Record: 2.2 goals-per-match average for individual goal scoring in a single World Cup finals tournament (Sándor Kocsis 11 goals in 5 games).
- World Cup Record: highest margin of victory ever recorded in a World Cup finals tournament match ( Hungary 9, South Korea 0 – July 17, 1954).
- World Cup Precedent: first national team to defeat two-time and reigning World Cup champion Uruguay in a World Cup finals tournament (Hungary 4, Uruguay 2, semi-final — July 30, 1954).
- World Cup Precedent: Sándor Kocsis, first player to score two hat tricks in a World Cup finals tournament (Hungary 8, West Germany 3 – July 20, 1954 & Hungary 9, South Korea 0 – July 17, 1954).
- National Record: Highest margin of victory recorded by the Hungary national team (Hungary 12, Albania 0 – Sept. 23, 1950).
- Precedent: first national side from outside the British Isles to defeat England at home since the codification of association football in 1863, a span of 90 years (Hungary 6, England 3, see "Match of the Century" – Nov. 25 1953).
  - Hungary's 7–1 defeat of England in Budapest the next year is still England's record defeat.
- Precedent: first national side in the world to eclipse an 1888 Scottish record of being undefeated in 22 consecutive matches (32 games).
- Precedent: first non-South American national side to defeat Uruguay (Hungary 4, Uruguay 2, semi-final — July 30, 1954), breaking a 17-game Uruguayan unbeaten run against non-South American competition dating from May 26, 1924.
- Precedent: first national side to defeat the Soviet Union at home (Hungary 1, Soviet Union 0 – Sept. 23 1956).
- Precedent: first national team in history to simultaneously host the No.1 and No. 2 world record holders for most goals scored internationally (Ferenc Puskás 84 goals, Sándor Kocsis 75 goals) from May 11, 1955, to October 14, 1956.
- Team Record vs. Elo Ranked Opponents: (June 4, 1950 – Oct. 14 1956), vs. world Top 10 ranked opponents: 11 wins, 2 draws, 1 loss / vs. world Top 5 opponents: 4 wins, 0 draw, 1 loss.

== Honours ==
- Central European International Cup
  - Champions (1): 1948–53
- Summer Olympics
  - Gold medal (1): 1952
- FIFA World Cup
  - Runners-up (1): 1954

== Bibliography ==
- Rogan Taylor, ed. (1998). Puskas on Puskas: The Life and Times of a Footballing Legend. Robson Books. ISBN 1861051565.
- Terry Crouch, ed. (2006). The World Cup: The Complete History. Aurum Press Ltd. ISBN 1845131495.
- Michael L. LaBlanc & Richard Henshaw, ed. (1994). The World Encyclopedia of Soccer. Invisible Ink Press. ISBN 0810394421.
- Jonathan Wilson, ed. (2006). Behind the Curtain: Travels in Eastern European Football. Orion Publishing. ISBN 9780752879451.
- Rogan Taylor & Andrew War, ed. (1996). Kicking & Screaming: An Oral History of Football in England. Robson Books. ISBN 0860519120.
- Diego Mariottini, "Tiki-taka Budapest: leggenda, ascesa e declino dell'Ungheria di Puskás", Bradipolibri, 2016, ISBN 9788899146214
