= Match of the Century (1953 England v Hungary football match) =

Match of the Century (1953 England v Hungary)
England	Hungary
(England)	(Hungary)
3	6
- Date: 25 November 1953
- Venue: Wembley Stadium, London
- Referee: Leo Horn (Netherlands)
- Attendance: 105,000

On 25 November 1953, Hungary – then the Olympic champions and on a run of 24 unbeaten games, and England, hailing from the birthplace of football, played an exhibition game which became known as the Match of the Century. Hungary won 6–3 and the result led to a review of the training and tactics used by the England team, and adoption of continental practices at international and club level in the English game.

England hoped this would be their biggest defeat, however they ended up with an even bigger loss to Hungary, losing 7–1 in 1954.

== Background ==
The England national team had suffered just one defeat on home soil against foreign opposition, which had been in 1949 against a de facto FAI Ireland side that contained a number of players that also played for Northern Ireland during this period (FIFA would later ban both the FAI and IFA from selecting players for both teams).

This had created a climate of complacency; the English Football Association (FA) simply assumed that as the originators of the game, English players were technically and physically superior to their foreign counterparts. In addition, coaching and tactical advances from abroad were ignored, with the England national side and the majority of clubs persisting with the outdated WM formation. England did have a national manager – Walter Winterbottom – but he had no prior managerial experience in professional football. His duties included managing the national team and developing the overall standard of coaching in England – a vast remit that indicated either naivety or a lack of interest on the part of the FA. Furthermore, Winterbottom did not pick the England squad: that remained with the FA's selection committee, who frequently displayed little or no consistency in their choice of player.

The first sign that England was no longer on top of the game could be seen one month before the match against Hungary, when England on the occasion of the 90th anniversary of the FA, encountered a European XI on 21 October 1953 in Wembley and drew luckily, thanks to a hardly justified last minute penalty 4–4. Bob Ferrier wrote in the Daily Mirror, that England needed "all the luck in the world" to achieve this result. Bob Pennington from the Daily Express called the penalty "a gift given to us by the referee".

The Hungary national team was a team creation of the Deputy Sports Minister Gusztáv Sebes in an endeavour to further sporting excellence in communist Hungary. Innovations included a precursor to "Total Football" several years ahead of the Dutch and the introduction of a deep-lying centre-forward position, occupied by Nándor Hidegkuti. The Hungarians had seen the virtue of creating fitness regimes as well as a club-like policy at an international level to give impetus to innumerable practice sessions; in addition, most of their players played for the State-sponsored Army team Honvéd, which ensured that each member of the team was familiar with the style and strengths of each of his teammates.

The Hungarian team was unbeaten since May 1950 and had won the football gold medal at the 1952 Olympics in Helsinki.

The British press referred to it as the "Match of the Century" – the originators of the game, against the finest team in the world at that time.

== The match ==
WM formation

The match was played on 25 November 1953 in front of 105,000 spectators at Wembley Stadium. The England team lined up in its usual WM formation, and included Stanley Matthews, Stan Mortensen, goalkeeper Gil Merrick, future England manager Alf Ramsey and captain Billy Wright – widely regarded as one of the best defenders in the world. The Hungarian team lined up in the 3–2–3–2 formation pioneered by their coach, Gusztáv Sebes. József Bozsik played in the deep-lying midfield position, with Nándor Hidegkuti free to roam between midfield and attack. Ferenc Puskás and Sándor Kocsis were the strikers, with the width provided by Zoltán Czibor and László Budai.

=== Match summary ===
Hungary kicked off, and scored within the first minute – Nándor Hidegkuti powering a shot past Gil Merrick. It was immediately apparent that the rigid English WM formation was unable to cope with the more fluid Hungarian tactics; time and again Hidegkuti and Ferenc Puskás drew English players out of position, allowing the more technically skilled Hungarian players to bypass their markers with ease. In particular, England centre-half Harry Johnston had a torrid time, as he was unable to decide whether to man-mark the deep-lying Hidegkuti or to remain in position and allow him to roam the pitch freely.

England were still capable of creating chances when they could get the ball; Stan Mortensen released Jackie Sewell, who put the ball past goalkeeper Gyula Grosics to draw equal on 15 minutes. However, Hungary proved irresistible; in the 20th minute Hidegkuti scored again from a poor England clearance, and four minutes later Ferenc Puskás scored the third goal via the soon to be famous "drag-back" – as England captain Billy Wright attempted to tackle him, Puskás dragged back the ball with the sole of his boot an instant before, leaving the English captain chasing empty space where the ball had been and beating Merrick with a clinical finish. England were simply unable to obtain the ball, and in the 27th minute, Puskás scored again from a deflected József Bozsik free-kick. There was a brief rally when Tottenham winger George Robb was denied a goal on his debut due to excellent goalkeeping by Grosics, and Mortensen scored for England on 38 minutes. England had the better of the last minutes of the half, but the half time scoreline of 4–2 to Hungary was a fair reflection of the overall superiority of the visiting side.

The second half continued in the same vein; Hungary the better team technically and tactically, with the English team constantly drawn out of position. Bozsik scored in the 52nd minute to make it 5–2; Hidegkuti completed his hat-trick with a volley on 55 minutes to make it 6–2. On an England attack, Robb was fouled by Grosics; Ramsey scored from the penalty spot. The rest of the game was end-to-end, but Hungary defended well and England had no clear chances. The final score was 6–3; Hungary had 35 shots on goal to England's five and their final goal, a Hidegkuti volley, followed a ten-pass sequence.

=== Details ===
25 November 1953

England	3–6	Hungary
Sewell 13'; Mortensen 38'; Ramsey 57' (pen.)	Match summary	Hidegkuti 1', 20', 53'; Puskás 24', 27'; Bozsik 50'

Wembley Stadium
Attendance: 105,000
Referee: Leo Horn (Netherlands)

England	Hungary

GK	1	Gil Merrick (Birmingham City)
RB	2	Alf Ramsey (Tottenham Hotspur)
LB	3	Bill Eckersley (Blackburn Rovers)
RH	4	Billy Wright (Wolverhampton Wanderers) (c)
CH	5	Harry Johnston (Blackpool)
LH	6	Jimmy Dickinson (Portsmouth)
OR	7	Stanley Matthews (Blackpool)
IR	8	Ernie Taylor (Blackpool)
CF	9	Stan Mortensen (Blackpool)
IL	10	Jackie Sewell (Sheffield Wednesday)
OL	11	George Robb (Tottenham Hotspur)
Manager:
Walter Winterbottom

GK	1	Gyula Grosics (Honvéd) (substituted off) 78'
RB	2	Jenő Buzánszky (Dorogi)
LB	3	Gyula Lóránt (Honvéd)
CB	4	Mihály Lantos (Vörös Lobogó)
DM	5	József Bozsik (Honvéd)
CB	6	József Zakariás (Vörös Lobogó)
RW	7	László Budai (Honvéd)
CF	8	Sándor Kocsis (Honvéd)
AM	9	Nándor Hidegkuti (Vörös Lobogó)
CF	10	Ferenc Puskás (Honvéd) (c)
LW	11	Zoltán Czibor (Honvéd)
Substitutions:
GK	12	Sándor Gellér (Vörös Lobogó)	(substituted on) 78'
Manager:
Gusztáv Sebes

== Post match analysis and discussion ==
The result was largely determined by tactical naïveté from the English manager and players. When playing the WM formation, the defending centre-half would traditionally mark the opposition's centre forward – usually whoever was wearing the number 9 shirt. In the game, England centre-half Harry Johnston found himself marking Hidegkuti – who was effectively operating as a midfielder. This meant that Johnston was constantly drawn out of position, allowing the rest of the Hungarian team to exploit the space. England were also undone by the use of Kocsis and Puskás as strikers – as these two were wearing numbers 8 and 10 respectively, England thought they were inside forwards. This in turn led to uncertainty about who should mark them – and to further confuse the English players, the Hungarian forwards were continually swapping positions, confusing the inflexible English defence. The England team were largely drawn out of position because their defenders were marking whoever was wearing a particular number, instead of marking the player who was playing in a particular area.

In addition, the England team members were not used to playing together as a team on a regular basis, whilst the Hungarians had the benefit of four years' experience of playing together at a club and international level. The fitness of the Hungarians in comparison to the English players was notable; Pat Ward-Thomas of The Guardian commented, "...the immense advantage of playing together so often, superior fitness (the Hungarians always looked finer athletes with their poised, beautifully balanced movements), and extraordinary understanding was obvious."

The Guardian newspaper report of the game was representative of the impact that Hungary's style of play had made: "The English team was competent by British standards except at inside forward, but on the evidence of this afternoon this standard will not long be good enough for England to retain her position in the high places of the football world. The essential difference lay in attack, where none of the English forwards except Matthews approached the speed, ball control, and positional play of the Hungarians, which were as near perfect as one could hope to see."

Sir Bobby Robson said of the game: "We saw a style of play, a system of play that we had never seen before. None of these players meant anything to us. We didn't know about Puskás. All these fantastic players, they were men from Mars as far as we were concerned. They were coming to England, England had never been beaten at Wembley – this would be a 3–0, 4–0 maybe even 5–0 demolition of a small country who were just coming into European football. They called Puskás the 'Galloping Major' because he was in the army – how could this guy serving for the Hungarian army come to Wembley and rifle us to defeat? But the way they played, their technical brilliance and expertise – our WM formation was kyboshed in ninety minutes of football. The game had a profound effect, not just on myself but on all of us." Robson went on to say: "That one game alone changed our thinking. We thought we would demolish this team – England at Wembley, we are the masters, they are the pupils. It was absolutely the other way."

"We completely underestimated the advances that Hungary had made, and not only tactically," Billy Wright said. "When we walked out at Wembley that afternoon, side by side with the visiting team, I looked down and noticed that the Hungarians had on these strange, lightweight boots, cut away like slippers under the ankle bone. I turned to big Stan Mortensen and said, 'We should be alright here, Stan, they haven't got the proper kit'."

Six members of the England team – Bill Eckersley, Alf Ramsey, George Robb and the Blackpool trio of Harry Johnston, Stan Mortensen and Ernie Taylor – were never selected to play for England again.

== Return fixture ==
On 23 May 1954, England visited Budapest in the hope of avenging the 6–3 defeat; instead, Hungary beat England 7–1. It still ranks as England's heaviest footballing defeat.

== Long-term influences ==
The result sent a shockwave through English football; for the first time, English manager and coaches started to look to the continent for tactical and training advances. Matt Busby at Manchester United was amongst the first to recognise that competing with the best European sides was essential to further the English game, and ensured that his team competed in the early European Cup – despite initial objections from the FA about English clubs taking part in the competition. Don Revie was an admirer of the Hungarian team, and enjoyed a late flourish to his playing career by adopting the Hidegkuti withdrawn centre forward role at Manchester City to great success, renaming it the "Revie plan". Bill Nicholson at Tottenham Hotspur was a swift adopter of the Hungarian principles, and used them to build the first English double-winning team of the 20th century, and to win the first European trophy – the UEFA Cup Winners' Cup – by an English side. Ron Greenwood built a successful European Cup Winners Cup side at West Ham United based on the Hungarian team principles. Don Revie and Malcolm Allison adopted training and coaching schedules based on the Hungarian coaching styles.

The effect of this match on Alf Ramsey and Greenwood may be measured from the fact that England's 1966 World Cup winning side contained something of a club nucleus when Ramsey selected three West Ham players (Bobby Moore, Geoff Hurst and Martin Peters), and in 1977 when Greenwood picked six Liverpool players (Ray Clemence, Phil Neal, Emlyn Hughes, Terry McDermott, Ray Kennedy and Ian Callaghan) to play Switzerland.

The popular 1998 Hungarian comedy film 6:3 Play It Again Tutti is based on the match.

== See also ==
- Wolverhampton Wanderers F.C. v Budapest Honvéd FC
