= József Tóth (footballer, born 1929) =

Hungarian footballer

Personal information
- Date of birth: 16 May 1929
- Place of birth: Mersevát, Kingdom of Hungary
- Date of death: 9 October 2017 (aged 88)
- Height: 1.73 m (5 ft 8 in)
- Position: Striker

Youth career
- 1940–1948: Csepel SC

Senior career*
Years	Team	Apps	(Gls)
1948–1961	Csepel SC	296	(78)

International career
1953–1957	Hungary	12	(5)

Managerial career
- 1964–1967: Kaposvári Rákóczi
- 1967–1970: Pápai Textiles
- 1972–1973: CD Pegaso
- 1973–1974: AD Torrejón
- 1975–1976: AD Ceuta
- 1976–1977: CD Badajoz
- 1977–1978: Lusitano de Évora
- 1978–1979: CD Colonia Moscardó
- 1979–1980: CD Badajoz
- 1980–1981: Gimnástica Arandina
- 1981–1982: UD Lanzarote
- 1982–1983: CD Leganés
- 1983–1984: CD San Fernando de Henares
- 1987–1988: Atlético Velilla
- 1989–1990: Marino de Luanco
- 1990–1991: Tomelloso CF
Medal record
Representing Hungary
FIFA World Cup
Runner-up	1954 Switzerland
- * Club domestic league appearances and goals

József Tóth (16 May 1929 – 9 October 2017) was a Hungarian football forward, who played in the 1954 FIFA World Cup.

The player from Csepeli Vasas, today known as Csepel SC played between 1953 and 1956 12 times for the Hungary national football team and scored 5 goals in the process. He also took part in the 1954 World Cup campaign of the Magic Magyars. In this tournament he played twice and scored one goal. However, he was not part of the line-up for the final. He was the last surviving member of the squad.

As manager, he developed his career in Spain and acquired the Spanish nationality. He started in Regional Preferente in the seventies, and reached Segunda División B in the eighties with Club Deportivo Badajoz, Gimnásitca Arandina, Marino de Luanco and Tomelloso CF. The clubs he managed were, among others, Club Deportivo Leganés, CD Pegaso, AD Ceuta, Talavera CF and CD Colonia Moscardó.
