= Keszthelyi =

Keszthelyi is a Hungarian surname. Keszthely is a Hungarian city. Notable people with the surname include:

- Ferenc Keszthelyi (1928–2010), Hungarian Roman Catholic Bishop Emeritus
- Rita Keszthelyi (born 1991), Hungarian water polo player
- Rudolf Keszthelyi
- Szvetlana Keszthelyi
- Tibor Keszthelyi
- Vivien Keszthelyi
