= Zoltán Czibor =

Hungarian footballer (1929–1997)

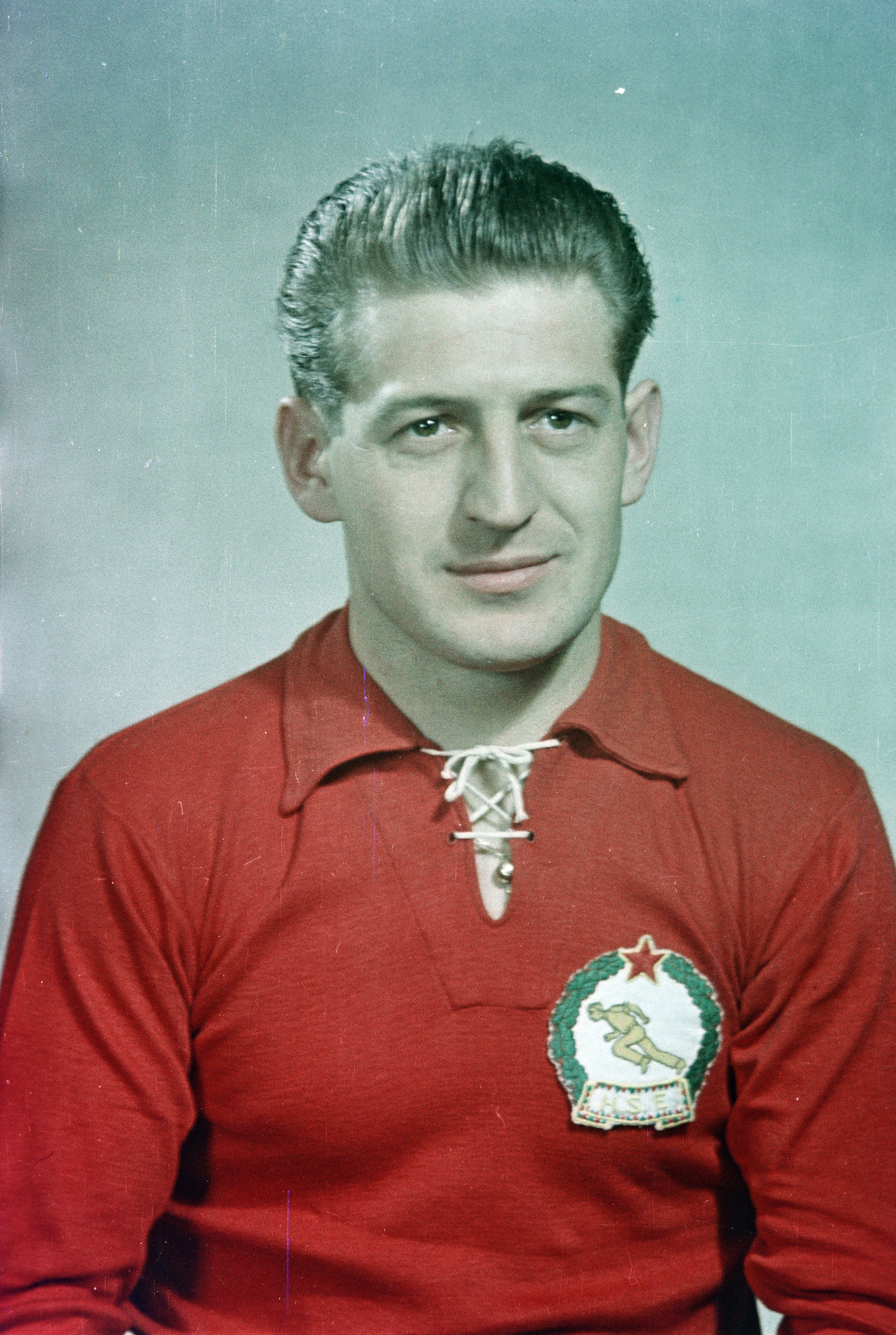
- Czibor in 1954

Personal information
- Date of birth: 23 August 1929
- Place of birth: Kaposvár, Hungary
- Date of death: 1 September 1997 (aged 68)
- Place of death: Győr, Hungary
- Height: 1.69 m (5 ft 7 in)
- Position: Left winger

Senior career*
Years	Team	Apps	(Gls)
1942–1945	Komárom AC	?	(?)
1945–1948	MÁV	?	(?)
1948–1950	Ferencváros TC	70	(33)
1951–1952	Csepel SC	51	(17)
1953–1956	Honvéd	80	(58)
1956	AS Roma	?	(?)
1958–1961	FC Barcelona	38	(17)
1961–1962	RCD Español	10	(2)
1961	CE Europa	?	(?)
1962	FK Austria Wien	1	(0)
1962	FC Basel	?	(?)
1964	Hamilton Primos		(?)
1964	Toronto Hungaria	1	(?)

International career
1949–1956	Hungary	43	(17)
Medal record
Men's football
Representing Hungary
Olympic Games
Gold medal – first place	1952 Helsinki
FIFA World Cup
Silver medal – second place	1954 Switzerland
- * Club domestic league appearances and goals

Zoltán Czibor (23 August 1929 – 1 September 1997) was a Hungarian footballer who played for several Hungarian clubs, including Ferencváros and Budapest Honvéd, and the Hungary national team before joining CF Barcelona. Czibor played as a left-winger or striker and was notable for having a powerful shot, good pace and excellent ball control. During the 1950s he was part of the Magical Magyars, reaching the World Cup final with them in 1954. After the 1956 Hungarian Revolution he moved to Spain where he became a prominent member of the successful FC Barcelona team of the late 1950s. After three seasons at Barcelona, he joined their local rivals Español for the 1961–62 season. After brief spells at FC Basel, Austria Wien and Primo Hamilton FC, he retired as a professional footballer and returned to Hungary. He died there in 1997, aged 68.

== Career ==
=== Early career ===
As a youth, Czibor played for Komárom AC and Komárom MÁV and was working as a train engine driver before he was noticed by Sándor Mezei, the coach of the Hungary youth team. He subsequently played for Ferencváros TC where he won his first Hungarian League title in 1949. After a spell with Csepel SC he conscripted into the army team, Honvéd. During his playing career in Hungarian club football, Czibor scored 100 goals in 175 matches.

=== The Mighty Magyars ===
Czibor made his debut for the senior Hungary team in 1949. He went on to play 43 times for Hungary and scored 17 goals. Together with Ferenc Puskás, Sándor Kocsis, József Bozsik and Nándor Hidegkuti, he formed the nucleus of the Golden Team that went unbeaten for 32 consecutive games. During this run they became Olympic Champions in 1952, beating Yugoslavia in the Helsinki final with Czibor scoring in a 2–0 win. They also beat England twice, winning 6–3 at Wembley Stadium and then in 7–1 in 1954. In 1953 they also won the Central European International Cup. The run came to an end in the 1954 World Cup Final when they lost 3–2 to Germany although Czibor scored once more in a final.

=== Honvéd ===
In 1953, Czibor joined Honvéd where his teammates included fellow internationals Puskás, Kocsis, and Bozsik. During his time at the club he won a further two Hungarian League titles in 1954 and 1955. He finished 1955 as top goalscorer in the league after scoring 20 goals. In 1956, Honvéd FC entered the European Cup and in the first round they were drawn against Athletic Bilbao. Honvéd FC lost the away leg 3–2, but before the home leg could be played, the Hungarian Revolution had erupted back in Budapest. The players decided against going back to Hungary and arranged for the return with Athletic to be played at the Heysel Stadium in Brussels. However, early in the game, the Honvéd FC goalkeeper was injured and, with no substitutes permitted, Czibor had to go into goal. Despite drawing 3–3 they went out on 6–5 on aggregate.

Elimination left Honvéd in limbo. The players summoned their families from Budapest and, despite opposition from FIFA and the Hungarian football authorities, they organised a fundraising tour of Italy, Portugal, Spain and Brazil. After returning to Europe, the players parted ways. Some, including Bozsik, returned to Hungary while others, including Czibor, Kocsis and Puskás, found new clubs in Western Europe.

=== FC Barcelona ===
Czibor initially went to Italy and played a couple of unofficial games for AS Roma before another Hungarian refugee, Ladislao Kubala, persuaded him and Sándor Kocsis to join him at FC Barcelona where he became a vital member to the team. He subsequently scored on his La Liga debut in a 6–0 win over Valencia CF and as part of a team that also included Ramallets, Evaristo and Luis Suárez, Czibor won a Copa del Generalísimo and La Liga double in 1959 and a La Liga and Fairs Cup double in 1960. Although he did not play in the Copa final, he scored twice in the Fairs Cup final as CF Barcelona beat Birmingham City 4–2. CF Barcelona and Czibor also reached the final of the European Cup in 1961, where he scored as Barcelona lost 3–2 to Portuguese club S.L. Benfica.

=== Later career ===
After three seasons at Barcelona, he joined their local rivals Español for the 1961–62 season. He had brief spells in Switzerland with FC Basel, and in Austria with Austria Wien. He then moved to Canada in 1964 and joined the Hamilton Steelers in the Eastern Canada Professional Soccer League. He finished the 1964 season with Hungária SC Toronto in the National Soccer League. He then played for Toronto City in 1965.

== Honours ==
Ferencváros

- Hungarian Champions: 1949

Honvéd

- Hungarian Champions: 1954, 1955

Barcelona

- Spanish Champions: 1958–59, 1959–60
- Inter-Cities Fairs Cup: 1958–60
- European Cup runner-up: 1960-61

Hungary

- Olympic Champions: 1952
- Central European Champions: 1953
- World Cup runner-up: 1954

Individual

- Two times best player of Hungary
- FIFA World Cup All-Star Team: 1954

== See also ==
- List of Eastern Bloc defectors

== Sources ==
- Behind The Curtain - Travels in Eastern European Football: Jonathan Wilson (2006)
- The World Cup - The Complete History: Terry Crouch (2002)
- 50 Years of the European Cup and Champions League: Keir Radnedge (2005)
- Hungary stats
- Memorial in Komárom
