= Sándor Kocsis =

Hungarian footballer (1929–1979)

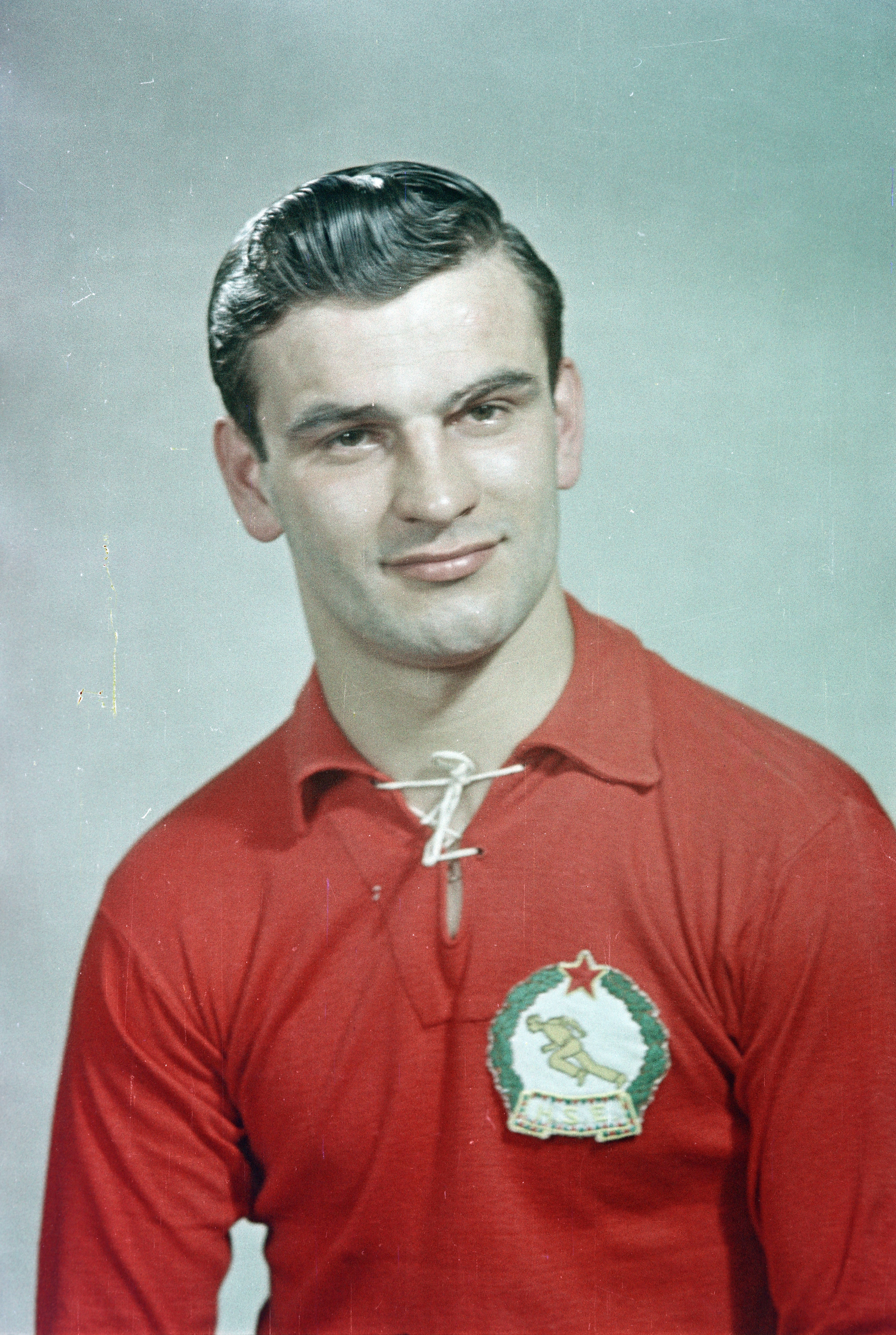
- Kocsis with Honvéd in 1954

Personal information
- Full name: Sándor Kocsis
- Date of birth: 21 September 1929
- Place of birth: Budapest, Hungary
- Date of death: 22 July 1979 (aged 49)
- Place of death: Barcelona, Spain
- Height: 1.77 m (5 ft 10 in)
- Position: Striker

Youth career
- 1943–1946: Kőbányai TC

Senior career*
Years	Team	Apps	(Gls)
1946	Kőbányai TC	5	(0)
1946–1950	Ferencváros (Note: From 1950 to 1951 the club's name was ÉDOSZ SE)	84	(67)
1950–1956	Honvéd	160	(177)
1957–1958	Young Fellows Zürich	11	(7)
1958–1965	Barcelona	75	(42)
Total		335	(293)

International career
1948–1956	Hungary	68	(75)

Managerial career
- 1972–1974: Hércules
Medal record
Men's football
Representing Hungary
Olympic Games
Gold medal – first place	1952 Helsinki
FIFA World Cup
Silver medal – second place	1954 Switzerland
Central European International Cup
Gold medal – first place	1948–53 Europe
Silver medal – second place	1955–60 Europe
- * Club domestic league appearances and goals

Sándor Péter Kocsis (SHAWN-dor KOTCH-ish; Hungarian: [ˈʃaːndor ˈpeːtɛr ˈkot͡ʃiʃ]; 21 September 1929 – 22 July 1979) was a Hungarian footballer who played for Ferencvárosi TC, Budapest Honvéd, Young Fellows Zürich, FC Barcelona and Hungary as a striker. During the 1950s, along with Ferenc Puskás, Zoltán Czibor, József Bozsik and Nándor Hidegkuti, he was a member of the Mighty Magyars. After the 1956 Hungarian Revolution, he moved to Spain where he became a member of the FC Barcelona team of the late 1950s.

Kocsis was a prolific goalscorer for both Budapest Honvéd and Hungary. While playing for Honvéd, he was the top goalscorer in any European league in both 1952 and 1954. He also scored 75 goals in 68 appearances for Hungary – a 1.10 goal/game average at the game's highest level. Kocsis was the top goalscorer in the 1954 World Cup with 11 goals, a record at the time for goals in a single World Cup. That year he scored 23 goals with his national team, the most by any player during a calendar year. He was also the first player to score two hat-tricks in a World Cup. His 2.2 goal/game average in the World Cup finals is second only to that of Ernst Wilimowski (Poland) who scored four goals in his only World Cup match, and only Just Fontaine has scored more goals than Kocsis in a single World Cup. According to the Rec.Sport.Soccer Statistics Foundation (RSSSF) he totalled 556 goals in 537 official games among which 123 goals in national team matches at all levels ranked third in recorded history. Kocsis was particularly known for scoring headers.

His 1.103 goals/game average is ranked No.1 for players past 43 caps in FIFA class-A competition, closely followed by Gerd Müller with 1.097 goals/game (68 goals in 62 games). They are the only two players in history above a +1.0 goals/game average encompassing over 43 internationals. Ferenc Puskás with .99 goals/game (84 goals in 85 matches) is currently ranked 3rd.

Sándor Kocsis registered a national record of seven hat-tricks for Hungary, including a four-goal haul against West Germany at the 1954 World Cup.

== Career ==
=== Early years ===
Kocsis was born in Budapest. He began his career as a junior with Kőbányai TC, before joining Ferencváros in 1946. There, he won his first Hungarian League title in 1949. He was then conscripted into the army and joined the army club, Honvéd. His teammates at Honvéd included Ferenc Puskás, Zoltán Czibor and József Bozsik. During his time at the club he won three more Hungarian League titles in 1952, 1954 and 1955. He finished as top goalscorer in the league on three occasions in 1951, 1952 and 1954 scoring 30, 36 and 33 goals respectively. On the latter two occasions he was also the top goalscorer in any European league.

During the 1952 season at Honvéd, Kocsis was the world's top goalscorer in world 1st division football with 36 goals. He repeated that feat in 1954 with 33 goals.

=== 1952 Olympics & 1948–53 Central European International Cup ===
Kocsis made his debut for the senior Hungary team in 1948. Together with Ferenc Puskás, Zoltán Czibor, József Bozsik and Nándor Hidegkuti, he formed the offensive nucleus of the Golden Team that went unbeaten for 32 consecutive games. The Hungarian national team suffered no defeats in Class-A international matches between 4 June 1950 and 4 July 1954, in the 1954 FIFA World Cup Final.

Kocsis scored his first international hat-trick in a game against Sweden on 20 November 1949, and he scored a further one on 22 June 1952 against Finland. Kocsis also scored six goals at the Olympics in Helsinki as Hungary became Olympic Champions in 1952. On 19 October 1952, he scored his third international hat-trick in a game against Czechoslovakia.

In 1953, Hungary defeated England 6–3 at Wembley Stadium and then in 1954 by 7–1 in Budapest. During the latter game, Kocsis added a further two goals. Hungary also won the 1948–53 Central European International Cup with Ferenc Puskás as top scorer.

=== 1954 World Cup & 1955–60 Central European International Cup ===
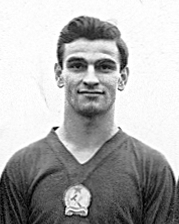
Sándor Kocsis (1953)

He finished the 1954 World Cup as top goalscorer, scoring 11 goals including two hat-tricks, the first of the three players that achieved this. In the opening game he scored his first hat-trick of the tournament against South Korea as Hungary cruised to a 9–0 win. In the next game against Germany, he went one further and scored four of the goals in an 8–3 win against the understrength team of coach Sepp Herberger. In the quarter-finals Hungary played Brazil in a game referred to as the Battle of Berne: Kocsis scored twice in an encounter which saw Hungary win 4–2. Hungary then reached the final after they defeated reigning World champions Uruguay in the semi-finals. The game was 2–2 in extra time until Kocsis scored twice to seal another 4–2 win. In the final they met Germany once again. However, for the first time in the competition Kocsis failed to score and the Germans won 3–2.

On 24 October 1954, he scored his sixth international hat-trick and second against Czechoslovakia. He completed his seventh and last hat-trick for Hungary on 5 November 1955 in a game against the same opponents, Sweden, that he had scored his first.

Ending the Golden years with a silver medal at the 1955-60 Central European International Cup, making it a grand total of 2 gold/titles and 2 silver for the Mighty Magyars.

=== Honvéd World Tour ===
In 1956 Honvéd entered the European Cup and in the first round they were drawn against Athletic Bilbao. Honvéd lost the away leg 3–2, but before the home leg could be played, the Hungarian Revolution had erupted back in Budapest. The players decided against going back to Hungary and arranged for the return with Athletic to be played at the Heysel Stadium in Brussels. Despite drawing 3–3 they went out on 6–5 on aggregate.

Elimination left Honvéd in limbo. The players summoned their families from Budapest and, despite opposition from FIFA and the Hungarian football authorities, they organised a fundraising tour of Italy, Portugal, Spain and Brazil. After returning to Europe, the players parted ways. Some, including Bozsik, returned to Hungary while others, including Czibor, Kocsis and Puskás, found new clubs in Western Europe.

=== FC Barcelona and coaching career ===
Kocsis spent one season with Young Fellows Zürich before another Hungarian refugee, László Kubala, persuaded him and Zoltán Czibor to join him at FC Barcelona where he became a vital member of the team. He subsequently scored on his La Liga debut in a 4–1 win over Real Betis and as part of a team that also included Ramallets, Evaristo and Luis Suárez, Kocsis won a Copa del Generalísimo and La Liga double in 1959 and a La Liga and Fairs Cup double in 1960. FC Barcelona also reached the final of the European Cup in 1961 and this saw Czibor and Kocsis return to the Wankdorf Stadium in Bern, where in 1954, while playing for Hungary, they had lost the World Cup Final and where, on 23 February 1958, Kocsis had lost 5–1 to BSC Young Boys while playing for Young Fellows Zürich. Despite both Kocsis and Czibor scoring, they finished on the losing side once again. They also lost by the same 3–2 score again, this time to S.L. Benfica.

He scored twice in the 1959 Copa del Generalísimo final as FC Barcelona defeated Granada CF 4–1. In the 1960 European Cup he scored four of the goals in a 5–2 quarter-final win over Wolves. He also scored a hat-trick against Real Sociedad in a La Liga game in 1961 and scored all three goals in the 1962 Fairs Cup final that they lost to Valencia CF 7–3 on aggregate. In 1961, he also played as a guest for Valencia CF and helped them win their own summer trophy, the Trofeo Naranja. He scored in both games as Valencia beat Botafogo and FC Barcelona. Kocsis also scored in the 1963 Copa del Generalísimo final held at the Camp Nou. FC Barcelona beat Real Zaragoza 3–1.

=== Later life and death ===
Kocsis retired as a player in 1966 and opened a restaurant in Barcelona called Tete D’ Or. He also worked as a coach with FC Barcelona and managed Hércules CF between 1972 and 1974. However his coaching career was cut short when he was diagnosed with leukemia and then stomach cancer. On 22 July 1979, aged 49, he fell to his death from the fourth floor of a hospital in Barcelona. It has been alleged that he died of suicide, though it may have been only an accident.

== Career statistics ==
=== Club ===
Appearances and goals by club, season and competition
Club	Season	League			National cup (Note: Includes Hungarian Cup, Schweizer Cup, Copa del Rey)		League cup (Note: Includes Supercopa de España)		Continental		Total	
Club	Season	Division	Apps	Goals	Apps	Goals	Apps	Goals	Apps	Goals	Apps	Goals
Kőbányai TC	1945–46	Nemzeti Bajnokság I	5	0							5	0
Ferencváros	1946–47	Nemzeti Bajnokság I	3	2							3	2
Ferencváros	1947–48	Nemzeti Bajnokság I	21	5							21	5
Ferencváros	1948–49	Nemzeti Bajnokság I	30	33							30	33
Ferencváros	1949–50	Nemzeti Bajnokság I	30	30							30	30
Ferencváros	Total		84	67							84	67
Budapest Honvéd	1950	Nemzeti Bajnokság I	15	24							15	24
Budapest Honvéd	1951	Nemzeti Bajnokság I	26	30	1	3					27	33
Budapest Honvéd	1952	Nemzeti Bajnokság I	26	36	3	13					29	49
Budapest Honvéd	1953	Nemzeti Bajnokság I	25	24							25	24
Budapest Honvéd	1954	Nemzeti Bajnokság I	26	33	5	13					31	46
Budapest Honvéd	1955	Nemzeti Bajnokság I	21	17	1	3			4	6	26	26
Budapest Honvéd	1956	Nemzeti Bajnokság I	21	13					2	2	23	15
Budapest Honvéd	Total		160	177	10	32			6	8	176	217
Young Fellows Juventus	1957–58	Nationalliga A	11	7							11	7
Barcelona	1958–59	La Liga	4	4	6	11	—		0	0	10	15
Barcelona	1959–60	La Liga	9	3	0	0	—		4	5	13	8
Barcelona	1960–61	La Liga	10	4	1	1	—		9	6	20	11
Barcelona	1961–62	La Liga	20	17	2	0	—		6	3	28	20
Barcelona	1962–63	La Liga	9	2	7	3	—		3	4	19	9
Barcelona	1963–64	La Liga	19	12	6	4	—		4	3	29	19
Barcelona	1964–65	La Liga	4	0	0	0	—		3	0	7	0
Barcelona	Total		75	42	22	19	—		29	21	126	82
Career total			335	293	32	51			35	29	402	373

=== International ===
Appearances and goals by national team and year
National team	Year	Apps	Goals
Hungary	1948	1	2
Hungary	1949	6	5
Hungary	1950	6	5
Hungary	1951	3	6
Hungary	1952	12	16
Hungary	1953	5	1
Hungary	1954	14	23
Hungary	1955	12	10
Hungary	1956	9	7
Total		68	75

== Honours ==
Ferencváros

- Nemzeti Bajnokság I: 1949

Honvéd

- Nemzeti Bajnokság I: 1952, 1954, 1955

Barcelona

- La Liga: 1958–59, 1959–60
- Copa del Generalísimo: 1958–59, 1962–63
- Inter-Cities Fairs Cup: 1958–60
- European Cup runner-up: 1960–61

Hungary

- Summer Olympics: 1952
- Central European International Cup: 1948–53
- FIFA World Cup runner-up: 1954
- Central European International Cup: Runner-up: 1955–60

Individual

- Hungarian Football Federation Player of the Year: 1954
- FIFA World Cup Golden Boot: 1954
- FIFA World Cup All-Star Team: 1954
- World Soccer: The 100 Greatest Footballers of All Time
- Ballon d'Or: 8th place 1956
- Top 11 hungary player all time: #2
- IFFHS men's all time Hungary dream team
- IFFHS World Player of the Century: #39
- IFFHS European Player of the Century: #23

== Sources ==
- Behind The Curtain — Travels in Eastern European Football: Jonathan Wilson (2006)
- The World Cup — The Complete History: Terry Crouch (2002)
- 50 Years of the European Cup and Champions League: Keir Radnedge (2005)

== See also ==
- List of men's footballers with 50 or more international goals
- List of men's footballers with 500 or more goals
- List of footballers who achieved hat-trick records
- List of world association football records
- List of Eastern Bloc defectors

Records
Preceded by Guillermo Stábile; 8	FIFA World Cup Highest Goalscorer; 30 June 1954 – 28 June 1958	Succeeded by Just Fontaine; 13
