= Nándor Hidegkuti =

Hungarian footballer and manager (1922–2002)

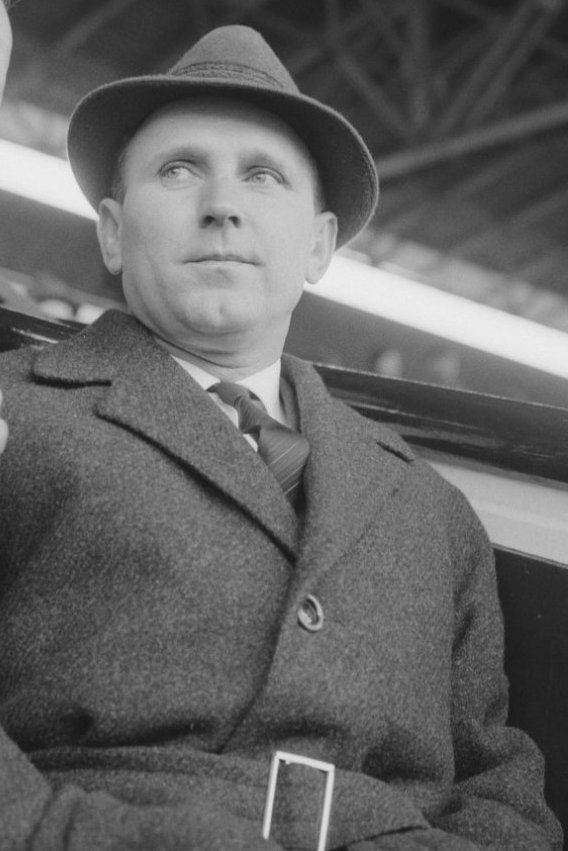
- Hidegkuti in 1965

Personal information
- Date of birth: 3 March 1922
- Place of birth: Budapest, Hungary
- Date of death: 14 February 2002 (aged 79)
- Place of death: Budapest, Hungary
- Height: 1.79 m (5 ft 10 in)
- Positions: Forward; attacking midfielder

Senior career*
Years	Team	Apps	(Gls)
1942–1945	Elektromos FC	53	(27)
1945–1946	Herminamezei AC		
1946–1958	MTK Hungária (Note: From 1949 to 1950 the club name was Budapesti Textiles SE, from 1950 to 1952 it was Budapesti Bástya SE and from 1952 to 1956 it was Vörös Lobogó SE.)	314	(226)
Total		367	(253)

International career
1945–1958	Hungary	69	(39)

Managerial career
- 1959–1960: MTK Hungária FC
- 1960–1962: ACF Fiorentina
- 1962–1963: A.C. Mantova
- 1963–1965: Győri ETO FC
- 1966: FC Tatabánya
- 1967–1968: MTK Hungária FC
- 1968–1971: Budapest Spartacus
- 1972: Stal Rzeszów
- 1973: Egri Dózsa
- 1973–1980: Al Ahly
- 1983–1985: Shabab Al Ahli
Medal record
Representing Hungary
Olympic Games
Gold medal – first place	1952 Helsinki
FIFA World Cup
Runner-up	1954 Switzerland
- * Club domestic league appearances and goals

Nándor Hidegkuti (3 March 1922 – 14 February 2002) was a Hungarian football player and manager. He played as a forward or attacking midfielder and spent the majority of his playing career at MTK Hungária FC. During the 1950s he was also a key member of the Hungary national team known as the Golden Team. Other members of the team included Ferenc Puskás, Zoltán Czibor, Sándor Kocsis and József Bozsik. In 1953, playing as a deep-lying centre-forward, a position which has retroactively been compared to the modern false 9 role, he scored a hat-trick for Hungary when they beat England 6–3 at Wembley Stadium. Playing from deep, Hidegkuti was able to distribute the ball to the other attackers and cause considerable confusion to defences. This was an innovation at the time and revolutionised the way the game was played.

Hidegkuti died on 14 February 2002 after suffering from heart and lung problems for some time. MTK Hungária FC renamed their stadium, Hidegkuti Nándor Stadium, in his honour.

== Club career ==
Hidegkuti started his career in Elektromos FC and Herminamezei AC.

=== MTK Budapest ===
Hidegkuti began playing for MTK in 1947. In 1949 when Hungary became a communist state, MTK were taken over by the secret police, the ÁVH and subsequently the club changed their name several times. Initially they became Textiles SE, then Bástya SE, then Vörös Lobogó SE and then finally back to MTK. Despite this turmoil, the 1950s proved a successful era for club and it was while at MTK that Hidegkuti, together with Péter Palotás and coach Márton Bukovi, pioneered the deep lying centre-forward position. With a team that also included Mihály Lantos and József Zakariás, MTK and Hidegkuti won three Hungarian League titles, a Hungarian Cup and a Mitropa Cup. In 1955, as Vörös Lobogó SE, they also played in the first ever European Cup. Hidegkuti scored twice as they beat RSC Anderlecht 10–4 on aggregate in the first round. After retiring as a player, Hidegkuti also had two spells as a coach at MTK.

== International career ==
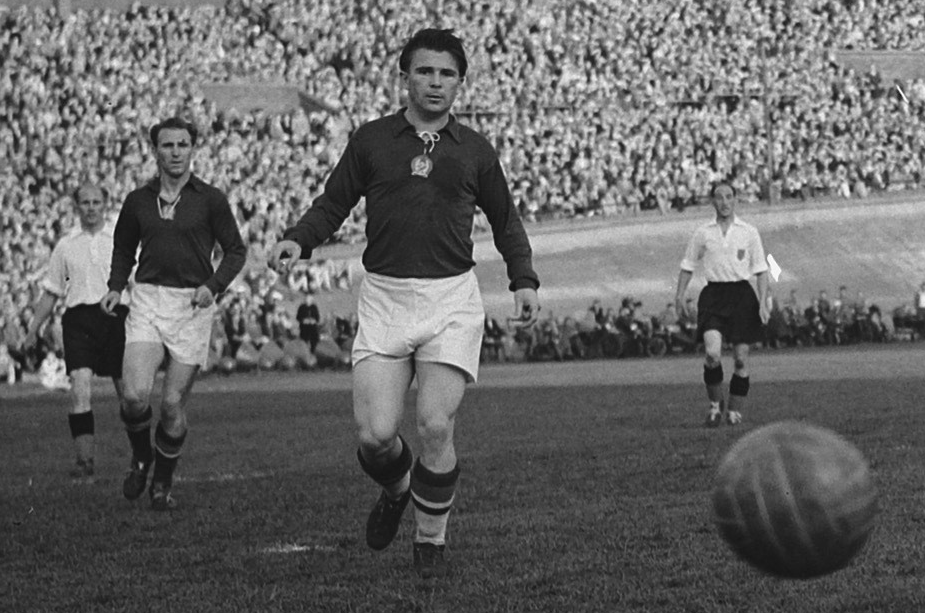
Hidegkuti and Ferenc Puskás in 1954.

Between 1945 and 1958 Hidegkuti earned 69 appearances and scored 39 goals for Hungary. He scored twice on his debut on 30 September 1945 in a 7–2 win against Romania. Two years later, on 17 August 1947, he made his second international appearance and scored a hat-trick against Bulgaria. On 18 November 1951 he scored another hat trick against Finland. He became a central player in the Golden Team of the early and mid-1950s; during this time, Ferenc Puskás, Sándor Kocsis and Hidegkuti provided the Hungarians a total of 198 goals.

Hidegkuti was used by the Golden Team as a deep lying centre-forward. In the 1950s, the majority of international sides still used the WM formation, where the defending centre half would traditionally mark the opposition's centre forward – usually whoever was wearing the number 9 shirt. When a defending centre half attempted to mark Hidegkuti, they were drawn out of position, allowing the rest of the Hungarian team to exploit the space. At the time this was a revolutionary tactic, requiring the player in the deep lying centre-forward position to have excellent ball control, distribution skills and positional awareness.

Former England and Leeds United manager, Don Revie paid tribute to the influence of Hidegkuti in his autobiography: "In the summer of 1954 England and Scotland were knocked out of the World Cup series in Switzerland. That competition was won by Germany, but dominated by Hungary, who played with a deep-lying centre forward, Nandor Hidegkuti. Alongside him; Sandor Kocsis and Ferenc Puskas, two of the greatest inside-forwards in the world. But whatever people claim of Kocsis and Puskas, it was the man Hidegkuti who tore the England defence to shreds at Wembley in November 1953. It was Hidegkuti, again playing his hide-and-seek centre-forward game, who shattered England in the return match in Budapest in May 1954, when we were thrashed 7–1." Sepp Herberger, manager of the West German team that would defeat Hungary in the 1954 World Cup final, identified Hidegkuti as the most important player in the Hungarian team (despite Puskas drawing a lot more public attention) and adjusted his tactics for the final to prevent him from playing out his game.

== Career statistics ==
=== International ===
Scores and results list Hungarys's goal tally first, score column indicates score after each Hidegkuti goal.

List of international goals scored by Nándor Hidegkuti
No.	Date	Venue	Opponent	Score	Result	Competition	Ref.
1	30 September 1945	Népstadion, Budapest, Hungary	Romania	1-0	7-2	Friendly	
2	30 September 1945	Népstadion, Budapest, Hungary	Romania	7-2	7-2	Friendly	
3	17 August 1947	Üllői úti Stadion, Budapest, Hungary	Bulgaria	5-0	9-0	1947 Balkan Cup	
4	17 August 1947	Üllői úti Stadion, Budapest, Hungary	Bulgaria	6-0	9-0	1947 Balkan Cup	
5	17 August 1947	Üllői úti Stadion, Budapest, Hungary	Bulgaria	9-0	9-0	1947 Balkan Cup	
6	19 September 1948	Stadion Wojska Polskiego, Warsaw, Poland	Poland	2-0	6-2	1948 Balkan Cup	
7	19 September 1948	Stadion Wojska Polskiego, Warsaw, Poland	Poland	6-2	6-2	1948 Balkan Cup	
8	18 November 1951	Megyeri úti Stadion, Budapest, Hungary	Finland	1-0	8-0	Friendly	
9	18 November 1951	Megyeri úti Stadion, Budapest, Hungary	Finland	3-0	8-0	Friendly	
10	18 November 1951	Megyeri úti Stadion, Budapest, Hungary	Finland	8-0	8-0	Friendly	
11	18 May 1952	Üllői úti Stadion, Budapest, Hungary	East Germany	1-0	5-0	Friendly	
12	18 May 1952	Üllői úti Stadion, Budapest, Hungary	East Germany	4-0	5-0	Friendly	
13	15 June 1952	Stadion Wojska Polskiego, Warsaw, Poland	Poland	3-0	5-1	Friendly	
14	28 July 1952	Olympic Stadium, Helsinki, Finland	Sweden	5-0	6-0	1952 Summer Olympics	
15	20 September 1952	Wankdorf Stadium, Bern, Switzerland	Switzerland	4-2	4-2	1948–53 Central European International Cup	
16	19 October 1952	Megyeri úti Stadion, Budapest, Hungary	Czechoslovakia	1-0	5-0	Friendly	
17	17 May 1953	Stadio Olimpico, Rome, Italy	Italy	1-0	3-0	1948–53 Central European International Cup	
18	5 July 1953	Råsunda Stadium, Stockholm, Sweden	Sweden	4-2	4-2	Friendly	
19	4 October 1953	Great Strahov Stadium, Prague, Czechoslovakia	Czechoslovakia	2-0	5-1	Friendly	
20	11 October 1953	Praterstadion, Vienna, Austria	Austria	2-1	3-2	Friendly	
21	11 October 1953	Praterstadion, Vienna, Austria	Austria	3-1	3-2	Friendly	
22	25 November 1953	Wembley Stadium, London, United Kingdom	England	1-0	6-3	Friendly	
23	25 November 1953	Wembley Stadium, London, United Kingdom	England	2-1	6-3	Friendly	
24	25 November 1953	Wembley Stadium, London, United Kingdom	England	6-2	6-3	Friendly	
25	12 February 1954	Prince Farouk Stadium, Cairo, Egypt	Egypt	3-0	3-0	Friendly	
26	23 May 1954	Népstadion, Budapest, Hungary	England	6-0	7-1	Friendly	
27	20 June 1954	St. Jakob Stadium, Basel, Switzerland	West Germany	4-1	8-3	1954 FIFA World Cup	
28	20 June 1954	St. Jakob Stadium, Basel, Switzerland	West Germany	5-1	8-3	1954 FIFA World Cup	
29	27 June 1954	Wankdorf Stadium, Bern, Switzerland	Brazil	1-0	4-2	1954 FIFA World Cup	
30	30 June 1954	Stade Olympique de la Pontaise, Lausanne, Switzerland	Uruguay	2-0	4-2	1954 FIFA World Cup	
31	19 September 1954	Népstadion, Budapest, Hungary	Romania	3-1	5-1	Friendly	
32	19 September 1954	Népstadion, Budapest, Hungary	Romania	4-1	5-1	Friendly	
33	8 December 1954	Hampden Park, Glasgow, United Kingdom	Scotland	2-0	4-2	Friendly	
34	25 April 1955	Praterstadion, Vienna, Austria	Austria	2-1	2-2	1955–60 Central European International Cup	
35	11 May 1955	Råsunda Stadium, Stockholm, Sweden	Sweden	5-2	7-3	Friendly	
36	29 May 1955	Népstadion, Budapest, Hungary	Scotland	1-1	3-1	Friendly	
37	15 September 1957	Vasil Levski National Stadium, Sofia, Bulgaria	Bulgaria	1-0	2-1	1958 FIFA World Cup qualification	
38	15 September 1957	Vasil Levski National Stadium, Sofia, Bulgaria	Bulgaria	2-0	2-1	1958 FIFA World Cup qualification	
39	22 September 1957	Népstadion, Budapest, Hungary	Soviet Union	1-1	1-2	Friendly	

== Managerial career ==
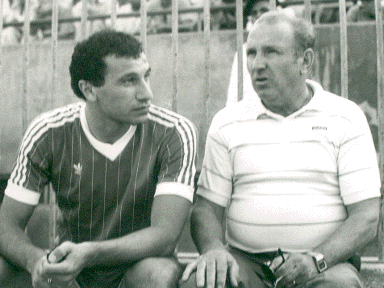
Hidegkuti with Mahmoud El Khatib (left) in Al Ahly training session, Cairo in c. 1979

As a manager Hidegkuti coached clubs in Hungary, Italy, Poland and Egypt. In 1961 he guided Fiorentina to victory in the first ever European Cup Winners' Cup, beating Rangers 4–1 on aggregate in the final. With Győri ETO he won the Hungarian League in 1963 and then took them to the semi-final of the 1964–65 European Cup where they lost to eventual runners-up, Benfica. In Egypt, Hidegkuti coached Al Ahly, introducing a 5–3–2 formation, he coached Al Ahly for seven seasons from 1973 to 1980.

For his model behaviour as a player and coach, he was awarded the 1993 FIFA Fair Play Award.

== Honours ==
=== Player ===
MTK Hungária

- Nemzeti Bajnokság I: 1951, 1953, 1957–58
- Magyar Kupa: 1951–52
- Mitropa Cup: 1955

Hungary

- Olympic Gold Medalist: 1952
- Central European International Cup: 1948–53
- FIFA World Cup runner-up: 1954

Individual

- Hungarian Football Federation Player of the Year: 1953
- FIFA World Cup All-Star Team: 1954

=== Manager ===
Fiorentina

- European Cup Winners' Cup: 1960–61

Győri ETO FC

- Nemzeti Bajnokság I: 1963
- Magyar Kupa: 1965

Al-Ahly

- Egyptian Premier League: 1974–75, 1975–76, 1976–77, 1978–79, 1979–80
- Egypt Cup: 1978

== See also ==
- List of men's footballers with 500 or more goals

== Sources ==
- Behind The Curtain – Travels in Eastern European Football: Jonathan Wilson (2006)
