= József Bozsik =

Hungarian footballer (1925–1978)

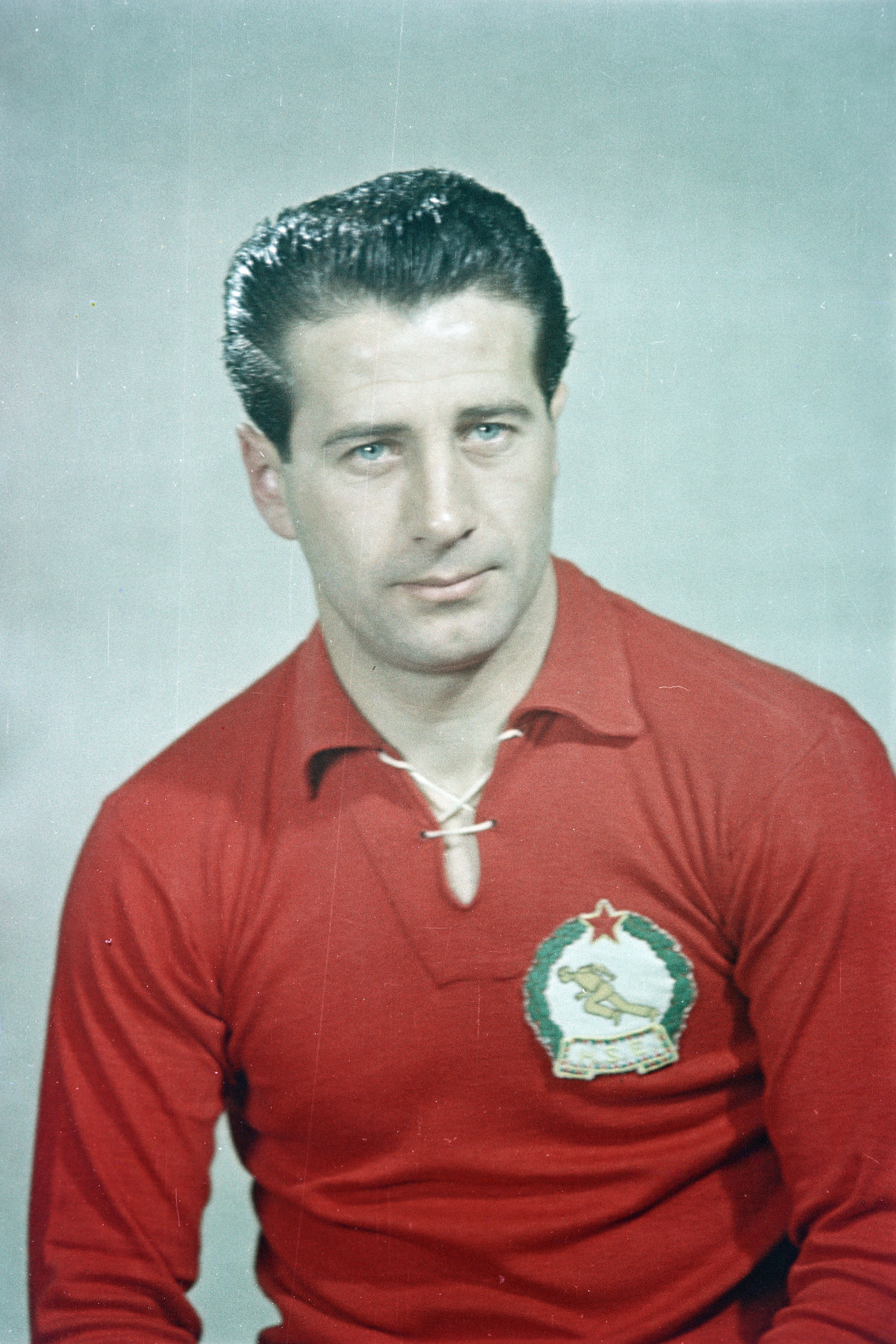
- Bozsik in 1954

Personal information
- Date of birth: 28 November 1925
- Place of birth: Kispest, Hungary
- Date of death: 31 May 1978 (aged 52)
- Place of death: Budapest, Hungary
- Position: Central midfielder

Youth career
- 1937–1943: Budapest Honvéd

Senior career*
Years	Team	Apps	(Gls)
1943–1962	Budapest Honvéd	477	(33)

International career
1947–1962	Hungary	101	(11)

Managerial career
- 1966–1967: Budapest Honvéd
- 1974: Hungary
Medal record
Representing Hungary
Olympic Games
Gold medal – first place	1952 Helsinki
FIFA World Cup
Runner-up	1954 Switzerland
- * Club domestic league appearances and goals

József Bozsik (Hungarian pronunciation: [ˈjoːʒɛf ˈboʒik]; 28 November 1925 – 31 May 1978) was a Hungarian footballer who played as a central midfielder. He spent his entire club career at his hometown club, Budapest Honvéd. Bozsik was a key member of the legendary Golden Team as he represented Hungary in various international tournaments. Honvéd named their stadium, Bozsik József Stadion, after him.

== Early life ==
József Bozsik was born in Kispest, now a district of Budapest. Given the nickname "Cucu" by his grandmother, he grew up playing football on the local football grounds in Kispest with his best friend and neighbour Ferenc Puskás.

== Playing career ==
As an 11-year-old, Bozsik attracted the attention of Budapest Honvéd and the club signed him to the youth team. In 1943, he made his debut for the first team against Vasas SC. He made his debut for Hungary at the age of 21 against Bulgaria on 17 August 1947 and went on to win 101 caps and score 11 goals by the time he last played for the national side on 18 April 1962 against Uruguay. He remained the most capped Hungarian player until 2016, when his record was broken by goalkeeper Gábor Király.

Bozsik won the Olympic gold medal with his country in 1952 in Helsinki and finished second with the Hungarian team in the 1954 FIFA World Cup. He also took part in Hungary's famous 6–3 win over England at Wembley and the team's 7–1 win over England in Budapest.

In 1956–57, Bozsik returned from Honvéd's winter tour to play in the 1958 FIFA World Cup. A year later, he won the Mitropa Cup with Honvéd. In all, he played 477 top-level games for KAC (and its legal successor BHSE) and scored 33 goals.

== Style of play ==
In his prime, Bozsik was considered one of the best attacking half-backs in the world, possessing good technique, flair, tactical nous, passing accuracy and creativity, although he suffered from a lack of pace. He was often used as a deep lying playmaker where his tackling ability was also helpful. He is considered one of the greatest Hungarian footballers.

== Post-playing career ==
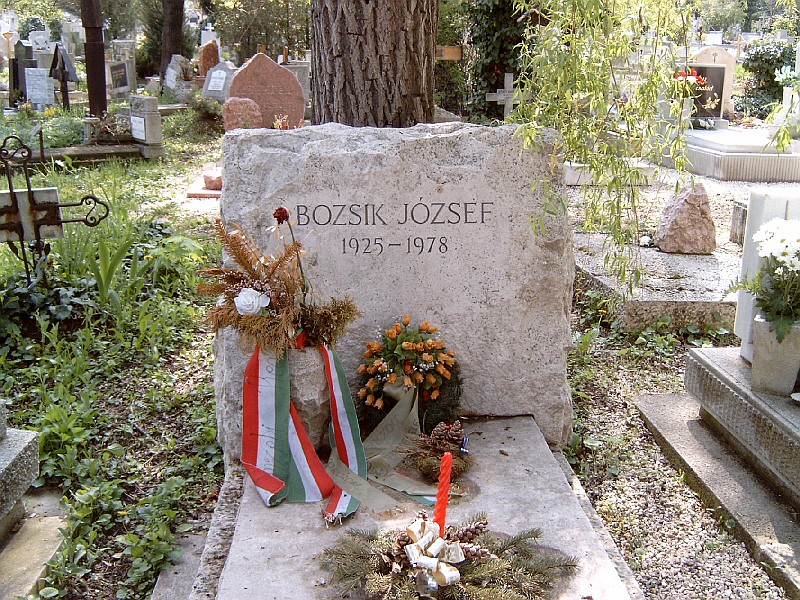
Resting place of József Bozsik

Throughout his career, Bozsik won many honours and was even made a Member of Parliament. After his retirement, he became a member of the board at his old club. He also managed the team for 47 matches between January 1966 and September 1967, after which he returned to his position on the board. In 1974, he was chosen to manage the Hungarian national team, but illness forced him to resign soon after he got the job.

== Death ==
József Bozsik died in Budapest, aged 52, due to heart failure. He was made a Freeman of Kispest posthumously.

== Honours ==
Budapest Honvéd

- Hungarian League: 1949–50, 1950, 1952, 1954, 1955

Hungary

- Olympic Champions: 1952
- FIFA World Cup runner-up: 1954

Individual

- Hungarian Football Federation Player of the Year: 1952
- FIFA World Cup All-Star Team: 1954
- Ballon d'Or: 6th place 1956

== See also ==
- List of men's footballers with 100 or more international caps
