= Gusztáv Sebes =

Hungarian footballer (1906–1986)

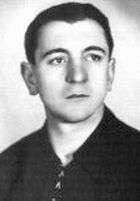
- Sebes in 1930

Personal information
- Date of birth: 22 January 1906
- Place of birth: Budapest, Austria-Hungary
- Date of death: 30 January 1986 (aged 80)
- Place of death: Budapest, Hungary
- Height: 1.70 m (5 ft 7 in)
- Position: Midfielder

Youth career
- 1919–1920: Müszaki Dolgozók SE
- 1920–1924: Vasas SC

Senior career*
Years	Team	Apps	(Gls)
1925–1926	Sauvages Nomades		
1926–1927	Club Olympique Billancourt		
1927–1929	MTK Hungária FC		
1929–1940	Hungária FC		
1945	MTK Hungária FC		

International career
1936	Hungary	1	(0)

Managerial career
- 1940–1942: Szentlőrinci AC
- 1942–1943: WMKASE
- 1943–1944: Csepeli WMFC (Weiss Manfred FC)
- 1945–1946: Budafoki MTE
- 1949–1957: Hungary
- 1968: Diósgyőri VTK
- * Club domestic league appearances and goals

Gusztáv Sebes (born Gusztáv Scharenpeck; 22 January 1906 – 30 January 1986) was a Hungarian footballer, who played as a midfielder, and became a well-known coach later. With the title of Deputy Minister of Sport, he coached the Hungarian team known as the Mighty Magyars in the 1950s. Among the players in the team were Ferenc Puskás, Zoltán Czibor, Sándor Kocsis, József Bozsik, and Nándor Hidegkuti. Together with Béla Guttmann and Márton Bukovi, he formed a triumvirate of radical Hungarian coaches who pioneered the 4–2–4 formation.

Sebes advocated what he referred to as socialist football, an early version of Total Football, with every player pulling equal weight and able to play in all positions. Under Sebes, Hungary went unbeaten for 22 consecutive matches. During this run, Hungary became Olympic Champions in 1952 and Central European Champions in 1953. They also twice defeated England, 6–3 in 1953 and 7–1 in 1954, and finished as runners-up in the 1954 FIFA World Cup. Defeat in the final marked the beginning of the end for Sebes. Following this defeat, Hungary embarked on an 18-game unbeaten run that came to an end on 19 February 1956, when they lost 3–1 to Turkey. Despite the winning streak, Sebes was sacked after a 5–4 defeat against Belgium on 3 June 1956. He remained active in football throughout his life, working as an administrator and holding coaching positions at Újpesti Dózsa SC, Budapest Honvéd SE, and Diósgyőri VTK.

Gusztáv Sebes, then Hungary's undersecretary of sports and vice-president of UEFA, participated in its meeting at the beginning of April 1955 with the aim of studying the proposal to create a European Cup where the best teams on the continent would participate. The initiative was promoted by the French sports newspaper L'Équipe, by its director at the time Gabriel Hanot together with his colleague Jacques Ferran, and with the support of the president of Real Madrid Santiago Bernabéu, as well as Sebes.

== Playing career ==
Sebes was born in Budapest, Austria-Hungary. The son of a cobbler, he initially played youth team football in Hungary with, among others, Vasas SC. He then worked as a trade union organiser in both Budapest and later, Paris, where he was employed as a fitter for four years with Renault at Billancourt. Sebes also played for the factory team Club Olympique Billancourt. On returning to Hungary in the 1920s, he played for MTK Hungária FC, where his teammates included Jenő Kálmár and Pál Titkos, both of whom later worked as assistants to Sebes. Other teammates included Iuliu Baratky and Ferenc Sas. During his time at MTK, he helped the club win the Hungarian League on three occasions and the Hungarian Cup once.

== Managerial career ==
=== Hungary national team ===
In 1948, Sebes, along with Béla Mandik and Gábor Kompóti-Kléber, was part of a three-man committee that took charge of the Hungary national football team. However, by 1949, with the title of Deputy Minister of Sport, Sebes was in sole charge and was given complete control of planning for the national side. He was inspired by the Austrian Wunderteam and the Italian team that won two World Cups in the 1930s. Both teams were predominantly drawn from one or two clubs, and Sebes wanted a similar system in Hungary. In January 1949, when Hungary became a Communist state, the resulting nationalisation of football clubs gave Sebes the opportunity. The two biggest Hungarian clubs at the time were Ferencvárosi TC and MTK Hungária FC. However, while the secret police (the ÁVH) took over MTK, Ferencváros was considered unsuitable because of its right wing and nationalist traditions. Sebes turned instead to Kispest AC, and the club was taken over by the Hungarian Ministry of Defence; it became the Hungarian Army team and was subsequently renamed Budapest Honvéd SE.

The Kispest AC team already included Ferenc Puskás and József Bozsik, but army conscription now enabled Honvéd to recruit Sándor Kocsis, Zoltán Czibor, and László Budai from Ferencvárosi TC; Gyula Lóránt from Vasas SC; and goalkeeper Gyula Grosics. Sebes was effectively able to use Honvéd as a training camp for the national team. Meanwhile, at MTK, coach Márton Bukovi began using the vital 4-2-4 formation, later adopted by Sebes. In particular, Bukovi, together with Péter Palotás and Nándor Hidegkuti, pioneered the crucial deep lying centre-forward position. Other MTK players, Mihály Lantos and József Zakariás, provided the Mighty Magyars with a solid defence.

=== Olympic Champions ===
It was at the 1952 Helsinki Summer Olympics that Sebes and his Mighty Magyars first came to prominence. With a forward line that included Ferenc Puskás, Sándor Kocsis, and super-sub Péter Palotás, Hungary easily progressed to the final. In five games, they scored 20 goals and conceded only two. In the semifinal, they defeated defending Olympic Champions Sweden 6–0; and in the final, they beat Yugoslavia 2–0, with goals from Puskás and Zoltán Czibor. Among those who witnessed Hungary's Olympics victory was Stanley Rous, secretary-general of the English FA and future FIFA president; he subsequently approached Sebes and invited Hungary to play England at Wembley.

=== Hungary v. England ===
Sebes planned for the game against England meticulously. He borrowed the heavier type of balls used by the English FA so that his team could practice with them and altered his training pitch so that the dimensions matched those at Wembley. He also arranged practice matches against Hungarian club sides ordered to play in the English style, and on 15 November 1953—two weeks before the England game—Hungary played Sweden's team, coached by Englishman George Raynor. He also made the decision to use Nándor Hidegkuti instead of Péter Palotás in the deep lying centre-forward role. On 19 September 1952, in a Central European International Cup game against Switzerland with Hungary down 2–0 after half an hour, he replaced Palotás with Hidegkuti. Inspired by Hidegkuti, Hungary was level at half time and eventually won, 4–2. On 17 May 1953, Hidegkuti helped Hungary clinch the Central European title when he scored in a 3–0 win against Italy at the Stadio Olimpico.

In 1953, on the way to London to play England, Sebes and the Mighty Magyars stopped in Paris and played a warm-up game against his former team (Olympique Billancourt), beating them 18–1 in front of 3,000 spectators. On 25 November 1953, Hungary took on an English team that included Stanley Matthews, Stan Mortensen, Billy Wright, and Alf Ramsey, and defeated them 6–3. In a stunning display of football, Hidegkuti scored a hat trick and Ferenc Puskás scored twice. After the game, a rematch was arranged as a warm-up for the 1954 World Cup. The return took place at the Népstadion in Budapest, and Hungary put in another impressive performance, winning 7–1.

=== The 1954 World Cup ===
Hungary entered the 1954 World Cup with both confidence and an unbeaten record since the defeat to the Soviet Union on 27 May 1952. They easily progressed through the group stages, with wins over South Korea and lacklustre Germany. Then, in the quarter-finals, Hungary won 4–2, surviving a bruising encounter (also known as the Battle of Berne) with Brazil. The game finished in a brawl, and Sebes ended up with four stitches after having been struck with a broken bottle. In the semifinals, Hungary defeated reigning world champions Uruguay. The game was 2–2 in extra time until Sándor Kocsis scored twice to seal another 4–2 win. In the final, they met Germany once again; however, the competition would end in disappointment for Hungary, losing 3–2 to the Germans in the "Miracle of Bern."

== Honours ==
=== Player ===
MTK Hungária FC/Hungária FC

- Hungarian League: 1929, 1936, 1937; runner-up 1928, 1931, 1933, 1940
- Hungarian Cup: 1932; runner-up 1930, 1935

=== Manager ===
Hungary

- Olympic Champions: 1952
- Central European Champions: 1953
- World Cup runner-up: 1954

=== Individual ===
- World Soccer 24th Greatest Manager of All Time: 2013

== Sources ==
- Wilson, Jonathan (17 February 2006). Behind the Curtain: Travels in Football in Eastern Europe. Orion. ISBN 978-0752869070.
