= 1954 FIFA World Cup final =

World Cup final, held in Switzerland

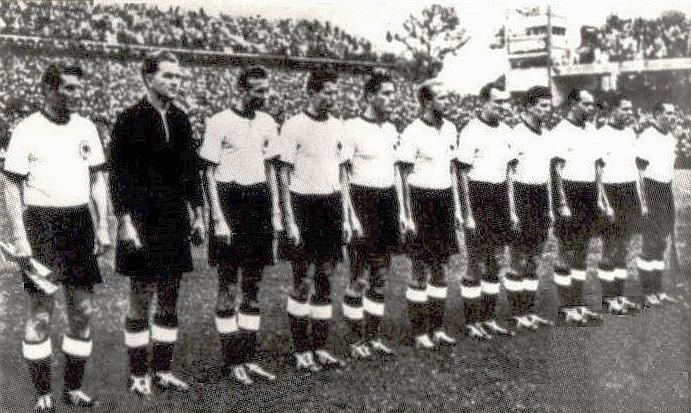
- The West German team that won the final
- Event: 1954 FIFA World Cup
West Germany	Hungary
3	2
- Date: 4 July 1954
- Venue: Wankdorfstadion, Bern
- Referee: William Ling (England)
- Attendance: 62,500
- Weather: Rainy

The final match of the 1954 FIFA World Cup was played at the Wankdorfstadion in Bern, Switzerland, on 4 July 1954, and saw West Germany beat the heavily favoured Golden Team of Hungary 3–2. Earlier in the group stage, Hungary had defeated West Germany 8–3.

The 1954 final is often listed as one of the greatest matches in World Cup history, and also one of its most unexpected upsets. Beyond football, some historians ascribe to the match a lasting impact on both German and Hungarian post-World War II history, contributing in West Germany to a sense of regained international recognition after the lost Second World War and denazification, and in Hungary to discontent with the communist-authoritarian regime in the run-up to the 1956 Hungarian revolution. In Germany, the 1954 final is known as the Miracle of Bern (German: Wunder von Bern, pronounced [ˌvʊndɐ fɔn ˈbɛʁn]).

The win earned Germany its first of four World Cup titles, with the other titles to follow in 1974 and 1990 as West Germany, and in 2014 as reunified Germany. West Germany was the third country to win a World Cup, following Uruguay (1930 and 1950) and Italy (1934 and 1938), although, different from Uruguay and Italy, West Germany won its maiden title as a guest rather than host. For Hungary, the second place in 1954 remains the best World Cup result to date, jointly with finishing runners-up in 1938. The 1954 tournament is the only FIFA World Cup thus far in which two teams from Central Europe contested the final, with another Central European team, of Austria, finishing third in the competition.

== Background ==
=== Hungary ===
Hungary's legendary Golden Team – also known as the Mighty Magyars – was the favorite to win the 1954 World Cup. In the five years prior to the final, it had remained unbeaten in 31 games (32 if counting a match against East Germany in 1952 that is not considered an official international). Hungary was also the reigning Olympic Champion and winner of the Central European International Cup in 1953. In 1953, Hungary defeated England 6–3 at Wembley, becoming the first team outside the United Kingdom and Ireland to beat England on home soil, and they thrashed England 7–1 in Budapest just before the World Cup. Hungary did not have to play qualifiers for the 1954 World Cup, as opponent Poland withdrew for lack of prospects.

The players of the Hungary national team were full-time professionals. Most played for the army club Budapest Honvéd FC, or for MTK Budapest FC, which, in the 1950s, was run by Hungary's secret police. Several members of the Golden Team were well known and highly regarded for their skills, including forwards Sándor Kocsis and Ferenc Puskás, attacking midfielder Nándor Hidegkuti, half-back József Bozsik, outside forward Zoltán Czibor and goalkeeper Gyula Grosics. Coach Gusztáv Sebes, who was also Hungary's Deputy Minister for Sport, and MTK coach Márton Bukovi are credited with developing further the rigid WM formation that was standard in European football in the early 1950s.

Innovations included pulling Hidegkuti – who was nominally listed as centre-forward – back into midfield to create space for the inside forwards, Puskás and Kocsis; employing Bozsik as deep-lying playmaker, with the other half-back, József Zakariás, covering for Bozsik; requesting full-backs to assist in attack and wingers to assist in defence; and introducing flexible positional play that created confusion among opponents used to fixed roles and strict man-marking.

=== West Germany ===
The three German entities emerging from the Second World War – West Germany, East Germany and the Saar protectorate – were not admitted to FIFA until late 1950. As a result, Germany missed the 1950 FIFA World Cup. In the early 1950s, Sepp Herberger – resuming the role as national team coach that he had already occupied between 1936 and 1942 – built the West German team around a nucleus of players from the club 1. FC Kaiserslautern, the German champions of 1951 and 1953, led by veteran playmaker Fritz Walter.

The players were semi-professionals (Vertragsspieler), who often worked in a second job or owned a business to support their incomes. Prior to the 1954 tournament, West Germany had played only a few friendly internationals and a short qualifying campaign (against Norway and the Saar). This lack of international exposure left both national and foreign observers unclear about the quality of the German team.

Herberger advocated clear roles in defence but permanent positional switches in attack – dubbed the "Herberger whirl" – to unseat the opponents' defenders.

== Route to the final ==
=== Overview ===
West Germany
Round
Hungary
Opponent
Result
First stage
Opponent
Result
Turkey
4–1
Match 1
South Korea
9–0
Hungary
3–8
Match 2
West Germany
8–3
Turkey
7–2
Play-off

Group 2 runner-up

Team	Pld	W	D	L	GF	GA	Pts
Hungary	2	2	0	0	17	3	4
West Germany	2	1	0	1	7	9	2
Turkey	2	1	0	1	8	4	2
South Korea	2	0	0	2	0	16	0

Final standings
Group 2 winner

Team	Pld	W	D	L	GF	GA	Pts
Hungary	2	2	0	0	17	3	4
West Germany	2	1	0	1	7	9	2
Turkey	2	1	0	1	8	4	2
South Korea	2	0	0	2	0	16	0

Opponent
Result
Knockout stage
Opponent
Result
Yugoslavia
2–0
Quarter-finals
Brazil
4–2
Austria
6–1
Semi-finals
Uruguay
4–2 (a.e.t.)

=== Hungary ===
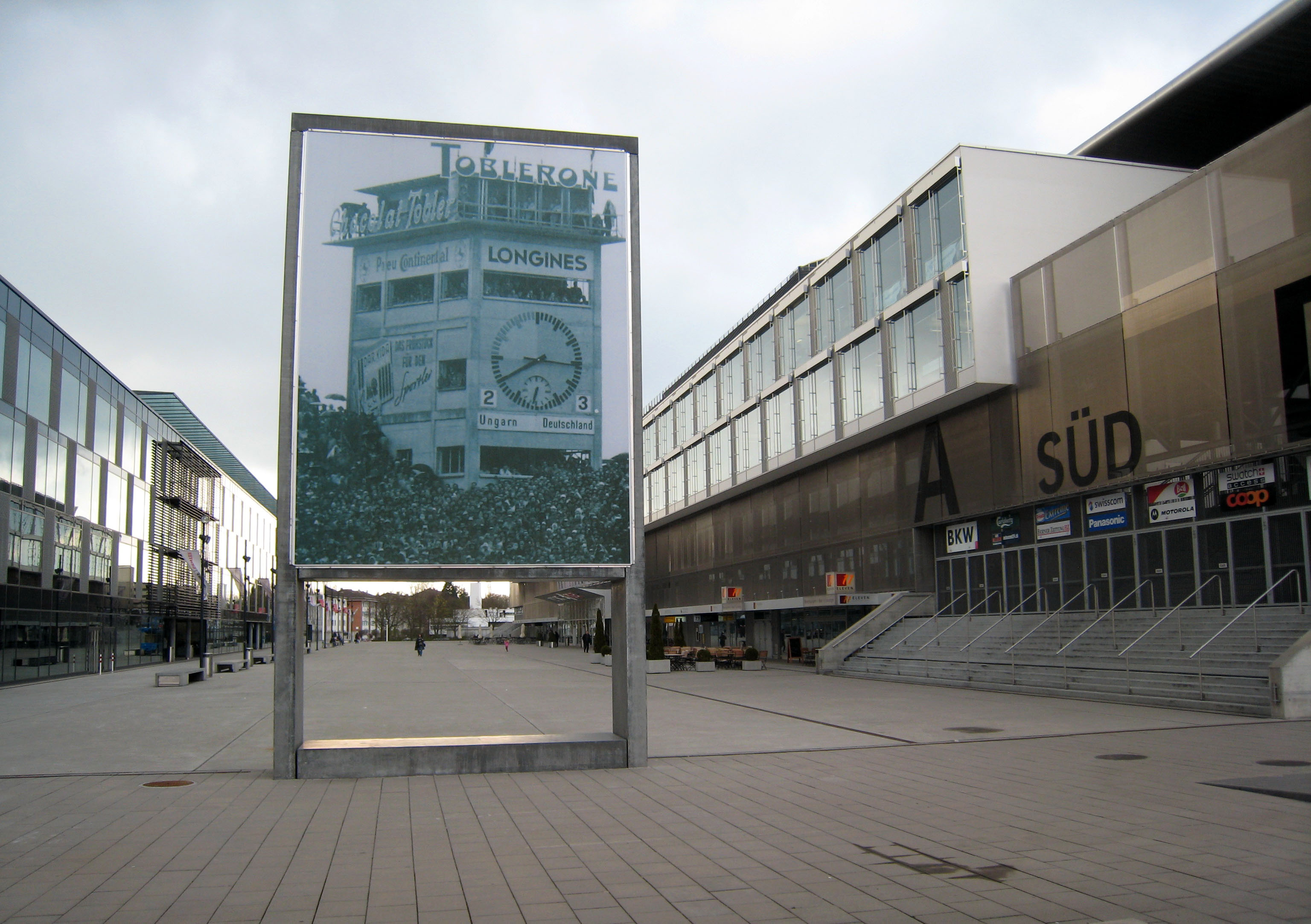
A well-known photograph of the 1954 final is installed in front of the Wankdorf's successor stadium, the Stade de Suisse.

In the first stage, Hungary and West Germany were drawn into the same group (2). Hungary opened the World Cup with a 9–0 win over South Korea. It then played Germany, winning 8–3, and therefore qualified for the quarter-finals. In the game, Puskás suffered an ankle hairline fracture from a foul by German central defender Werner Liebrich that made Puskás miss the quarter- and semi-finals.

In the quarter-finals, Hungary beat co-favorites Brazil – runners-up of the 1950 World Cup – with 4–2, despite Puskás' absence. The hard-fought, grueling match became famous as the Battle of Berne. In the semi-finals, Hungary defeated defending World Cup champions Uruguay 4–2 after extra time. Also this match is regarded a classic for the high quality of both sides' attacking game. Kocsis scored twice in both the quarter- and semi-finals.

From a statistical perspective, on the eve of the 1954 World Cup final, the Hungarian team held the highest Elo score for a national side to that date. Its rating was surpassed only in 2014 by Germany.

=== West Germany ===
West Germany first played Turkey, winning 4–1. In the subsequent 3–8 loss to Hungary, Herberger rested several key players and played others out of position (for example, Fritz Walter as central striker instead of playmaker). The main purpose was to preserve energy for the upcoming decider against (once more) Turkey. However, by sparing his strongest eleven, Herberger may have obscured the real strength of the German team to its subsequent opponents, including Hungary. Germany won the decider against Turkey 7–2.

West Germany went as outsider into both its quarter- and semi-final matches. In the quarter-finals, West Germany beat highly regarded Yugoslavia – the Olympic silver medalists of 1952 – with 2–0. The team then went on to defeat Austria in the semi-finals, with an unexpectedly lopsided score of 6–1.

== Pre-match ==
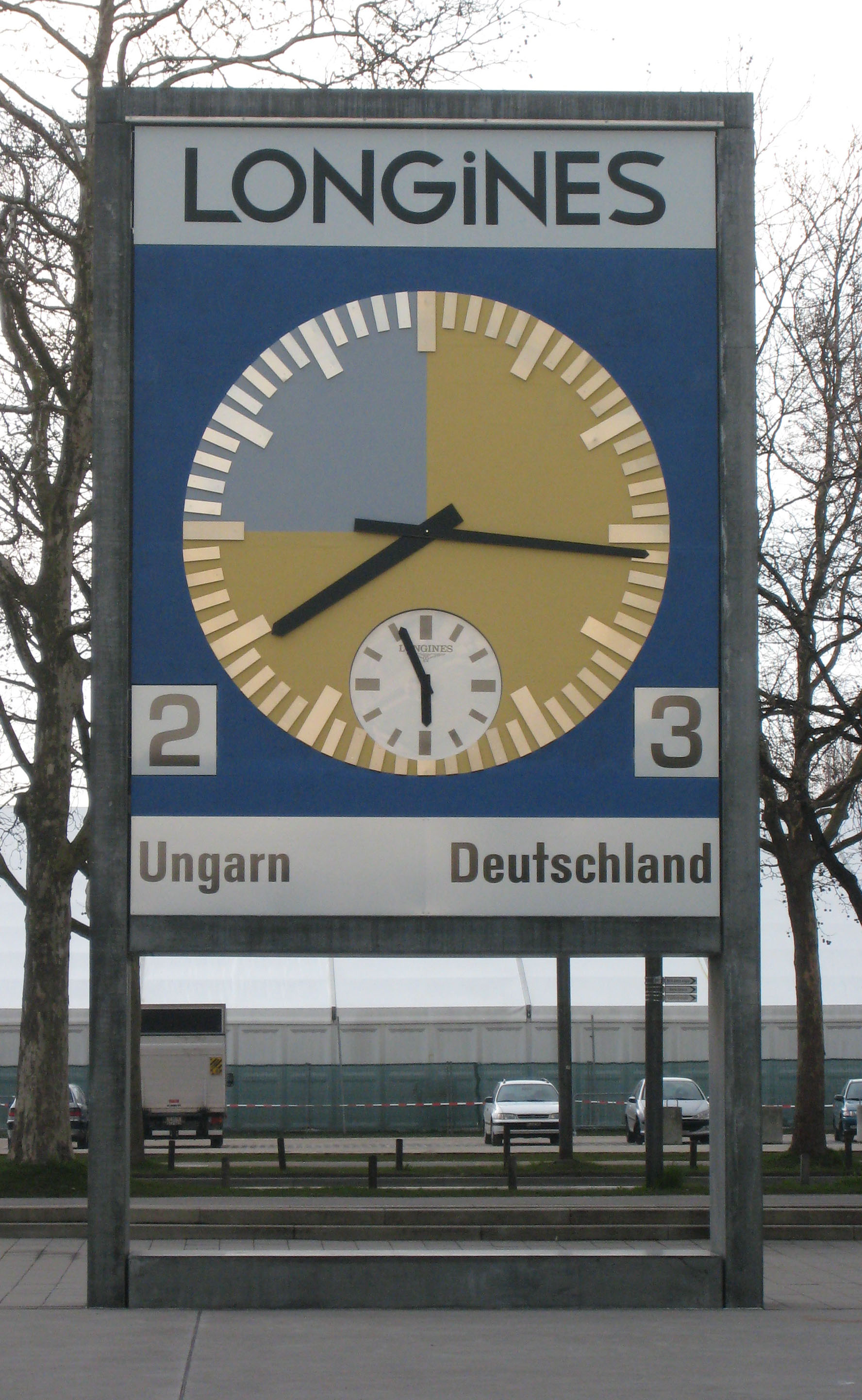
The restored match clock has been installed in front of the Stade de Suisse as a memorial.

=== Team preparations ===
During the tournament, the Hungarian team took residence in a hotel in the town center of Solothurn. This had several repercussions. As Hungary's semi-final against Uruguay was decided only after extra time, the team missed the return bus from Lausanne, and had to organize private cars that arrived only late at night. The evening before the final, a village fair took place in front of the hotel that lasted until the early morning hours and disrupted the players' sleep. Further, Herberger's assistant Albert Sing checked into the hotel, from where he reported about the Hungarian team preparations.

By contrast, the German team resided in the tranquil lake town of Spiez, where it was unaffected from such disturbances. The Spirit of Spiez became proverbial in Germany for describing the team's morale and comradeship.

=== Lineups and tactics ===
Puskás returned to the Hungarian squad for the final, despite doubts about his fitness. Further, Sebes replaced the customary right winger László Budai with Mihály Tóth, as he considered Budai too exhausted after the semi-finals. He also placed left winger Czibor on the right in the first half (switching with Tóth), to exploit Czibor's speed against Germany's left fullback Werner Kohlmeyer. Other than this, Sebes fielded his standard formation.

The German team had evolved in the course of the tournament, finding its final formation only in the semi-finals. In particular, central defender Liebrich and right winger Helmut Rahn secured places in the starting lineup only after strong performances in the quarter-finals against Yugoslavia. In the final, Herberger had Hidegkuti marked by a midfielder, Horst Eckel, to prevent Hidegkuti from pulling Liebrich out of the defence when he dropped deep into midfield. He also instructed left winger Hans Schäfer to cover Bozsik when Hungary was attacking, to help Fritz Walter – who normally would have been Bozsik's marker – preserve energy and concentrate on organising the German game.

=== Conditions ===
The match was played in heavy rain, conditions that the German side had christened "Fritz Walter weather", as Walter was known for playing his best football in the wet. In addition, the German team was equipped with boots supplied by Adidas that featured hitherto unknown, exchangeable, screw-in studs. The boots could be adapted to any weather, enabling the German players to wear their regular footwear despite the adverse conditions.

== Match ==
=== Summary ===
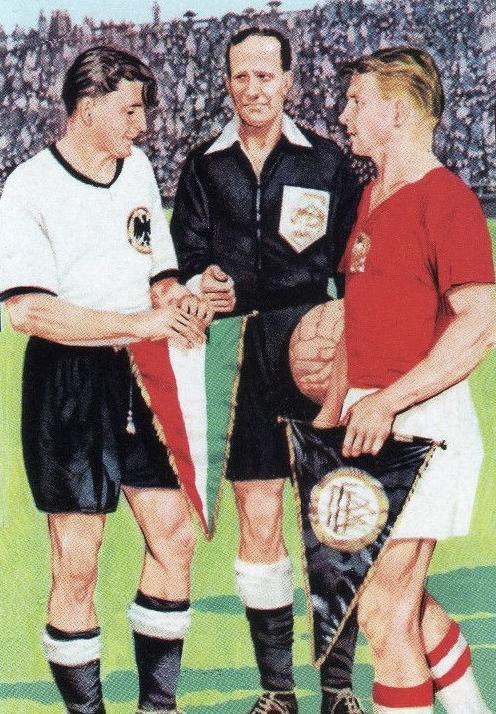
The captains Fritz Walter and Ferenc Puskás with referee Ling (Liebig football card from 1966)

Puskás put his team ahead after only six minutes, when Bozsik intercepted a pass from Liebrich and found Kocsis with a through ball. Kocsis' blocked shot fell to Puskás, and Puskás scored from close range. Czibor added a second goal for Hungary a mere two minutes later, exploiting a misunderstanding in the German defense: Kohlmeyer secured a through ball from Bozsik but wrong-footed goalkeeper Toni Turek with a back pass, who failed to control the ball. Czibor sprinted in between and put the ball into the empty net.

West Germany came back quickly. In the 10th minute, Fritz Walter played Rahn free on the left wing, who crossed low and hard into the center. The ball went through the legs of right fullback Jenő Buzánszky, Zakariás lunged for the ball but could only deflect it, and forward Max Morlock converted from close range. Eight minutes later Morlock dribbled through the Hungarian defense, but center back Gyula Lóránt cleared for a corner. Fritz Walter played the corner short, Buzánszky cleared for another corner. The second corner kick came long and high, finding Rahn, who leveled the score.

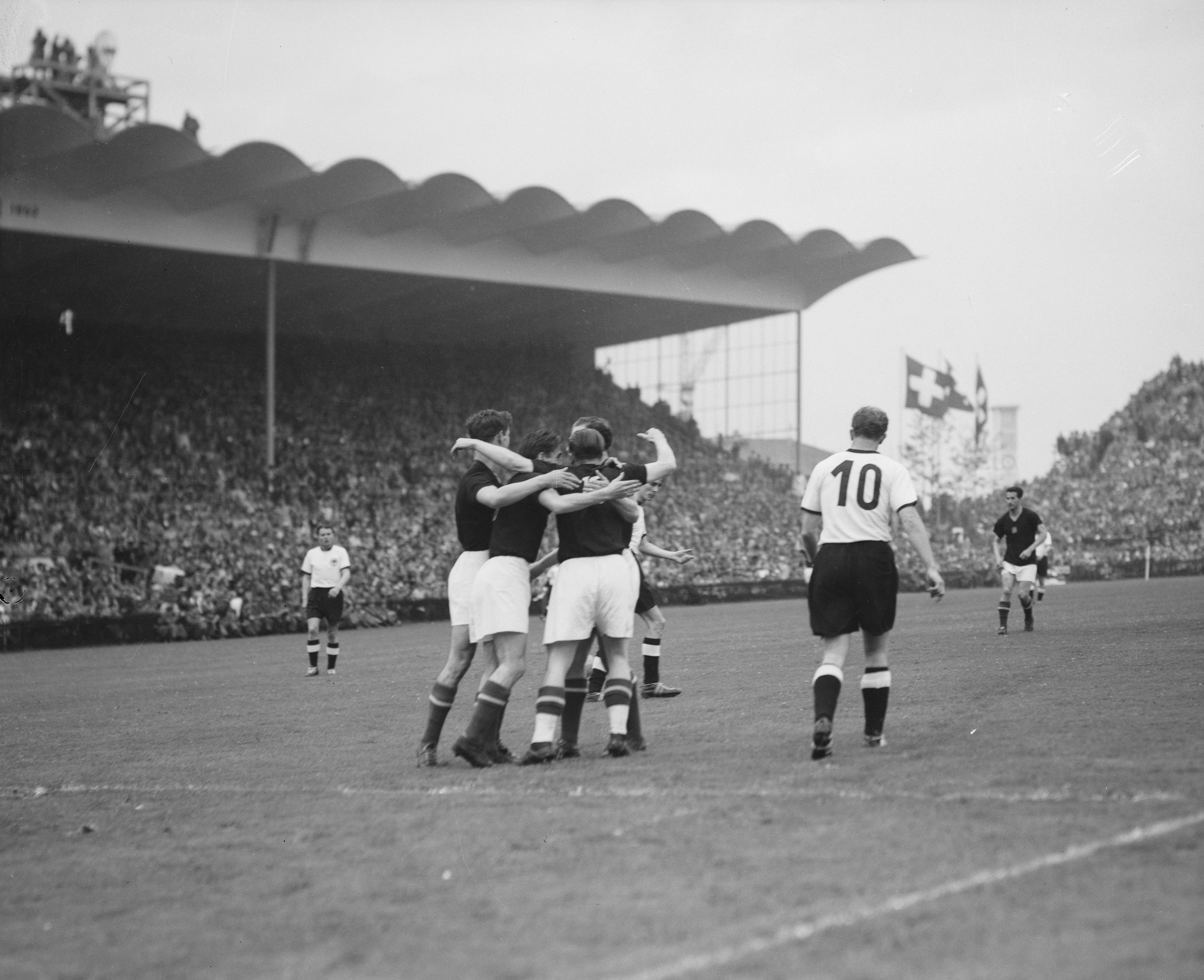
The Hungarians celebrating their first goal

Hungary took control after the equalizer and came to several good chances. In the 23rd minute, left fullback Mihály Lantos chipped the ball into the box, Kocsis headed on to Hidegkuti, but Hidegkuti's volley was saved spectacularly by Turek. Four minutes later, Hidegkuti fired another shot from the edge of the penalty box that hit the goal post. Only towards the end of the first half did West Germany come to more chances. In the 42nd minute, Fritz Walter found Schäfer in the penalty box, who dribbled past Lóránt and forced a save at full stretch from Grosics. The loose ball fell to Rahn, but Buzánszky cleared on the goal line.

Hungary came out attacking in the second half and created plentiful chances. Two minutes after the restart, Bozsik played Puskás free in the penalty box, but Puskás fired the ball straight at Turek. In the 54th minute, Kohlmeyer cleared twice on the goal line from Tóth, and three minutes later Kocsis headed a cross by Tóth against the cross bar.

In the 67th minute, Turek saved a shot by Puskás with his foot, and in the 78th minute he left the goal line to block a through ball from Bozsik ahead of the onrushing Czibor. Hidegkuti picked up the loose ball but shot into the side netting. West Germany's first good chance of the second half came in the 72nd minute when Fritz Walter played Rahn free after a corner kick, and Rahn's powerful shot from the edge of the penalty box was saved by Grosics.

With six minutes left, Schäfer dispossessed Bozsik and played a high cross into the penalty box. Rahn picked up Lantos' short clearance, feinted a pass to center forward Ottmar Walter that wrong-footed the Hungarian defenders, moved into the penalty box, and drove the ball hard and low past Grosics for the third German goal. Two minutes later, Puskás appeared to have leveled the score once more when he converted a through ball from Tóth flicked on by Kocsis, but the attempt was ruled offside. In the final minute of the game, Czibor had another chance to equalize, but his shot from close range was again stopped by Turek.

The whistle soon thereafter ended not only the match, but also the Golden Team's unbeaten run.

=== Details ===
4 July 1954
17:00 CET

West Germany	3–2	Hungary
Morlock 10'; Rahn 18', 84'		Puskás 6'; Czibor 8'

Wankdorfstadion, Bern
Attendance: 62,500
Referee: William Ling (England)

West Germany	Hungary

GK	1	Toni Turek
RB	7	Josef Posipal
CB	10	Werner Liebrich
LB	3	Werner Kohlmeyer
RH	6	Horst Eckel
LH	8	Karl Mai
OR	12	Helmut Rahn
IR	13	Max Morlock
CF	15	Ottmar Walter
IL	16	Fritz Walter (c)
OL	20	Hans Schäfer
Manager:
Sepp Herberger

GK	1	Gyula Grosics
RB	2	Jenő Buzánszky
CB	3	Gyula Lóránt
LB	4	Mihály Lantos
RH	5	József Bozsik
LH	6	József Zakariás
SS	9	Nándor Hidegkuti
OR	11	Zoltán Czibor
IR	8	Sándor Kocsis
IL	10	Ferenc Puskás (c)
OL	20	Mihály Tóth
Manager:
Gusztáv Sebes

Assistant referees:
Vincenzo Orlandini (Italy)
Sandy Griffiths (Wales)

Match rules

- 90 minutes.
- 30 minutes of extra time if necessary.
- Replay if scores still level.
- No substitutions permitted.

=== Statistics ===
Statistic	West Germany	Hungary
Goals scored	3	2
Total shots	15	26
Shots on target	10	16
Blocked shots	8	7
Corner kicks	7	5
Fouls committed	10	7
Offsides	9	3
Sendings-off	0	0

A match analysis by the website spielverlagerung.de, produced 60 years after the game based on data extracted from Herbert Zimmermann's live radio commentary, shows Hungary ahead in most categories, except goals scored. Hungarian superiority was especially pronounced during minutes 20–40 and 45–70, while West Germany had good phases towards the end of the first and second halves.

The analysis also suggests that many Hungarian attacks went through the centre, in most cases orchestrated by Bozsik, who played numerous accurate through balls to Hungary's forwards. By contrast, the German team attacked almost exclusively from the wings, with Fritz Walter playing a key role as ball distributor and flexible offensive player generating numerical superiority in select portions of the pitch.

Further, the data point to an excellent defensive performance by Liebrich, who – according to Zimmermann's commentary – blocked six shots, intercepted nine passes, and won all of his 10 one-on-one duels.

== Controversies ==
=== Refereeing decisions ===
Several calls by the English referee William Ling came under scrutiny after the final. These included:

- Germany's second goal. Grosics attempted to clear the corner kick by Fritz Walter in the air, but collided in the six-yard box with Schäfer. As a result, the ball went through to Rahn, who converted. Had Ling called a foul on Grosics, the goal would not have counted.
- Hungary's disallowed third goal. Eyewitness accounts differ on whether Puskás was offside. The official television footage allows no clear verdict, as it fails to show Puskás' position at the moment when the ball was passed. The Hungarian players claimed that Ling first wanted to allow the goal, but changed his mind after talking to Welsh linesman Sandy Griffiths.

=== Doping allegations ===
Immediately after the match, rumors emerged that the German team had taken performance-enhancing substances. Several members of the team fell ill with jaundice, presumably from a contaminated needle, and of them, winger Richard Herrmann, died just eight years later of cirrhosis, at the age of 39. Members of the team later claimed they had been injected glucose, and the team physician Franz Loogen said in 2004 that the players had only been given Vitamin C before the game.

In 2010, Erik Eggers of the Humboldt University of Berlin challenged the validity of these claims, stating: "Vitamin C is not injected. This is very unusual. They could have just eaten an orange instead." As the co-author of a study conducted by the University of Leipzig, he also hypothesized that the German players, unbeknownst to them, may have been injected with Pervitin (methamphetamine) – a stimulant given to soldiers in World War II.

In 2013, the Süddeutsche Zeitung publicized details from the finished, 800-page study, in which Eggers and his team stated that the use of amphetamines became "normal" in German football from the end of the 1940s, and reaffirmed their previous claim that an unspecified number of players of the 1954 team received injections of Pervitin. In an interview with Der Spiegel, Eggers also claimed that the German Football Association hampered their research by not allowing the team to access their archives.

In any case, doping was not illegal in 1954, with doping controls introduced by FIFA only in 1966.

== Radio commentaries ==
As television was available only in a few homes or public places in 1954, the radio reports by György Szepesi and Herbert Zimmermann were the main vehicles for transmitting the World Cup final live to the Hungarian and West German populations. Both commentaries became legendary for their passionate, emotional reporting styles, and are sometimes credited with contributing to the charged atmosphere in both countries after the final.

Szepesi – who later became the chairman of the Hungarian Football Federation – had been a household name in Hungary since his report of the Golden Team's 6–3 victory over England in 1953. He started his commentary of the World Cup final with cautious confidence, reinforced after Hungary's opening goal: "Puskás shoots... GOAL... A WONDERFUL GOAL! ... There is the lead. Öcsi's [i.e., Puskas'] foot is fine, this one could see with this shot. ... And now: calmly, boys, just as we played at the 8–3". Doubts started creeping in after Germany shortened the lead – "the clouds are piling up in front of the mountains... hopefully this is not a bad sign" – and grew stronger at half time – "it will be even more difficult than the matches before, more difficult perhaps than against Brazil and Uruguay".

Szepesi's doubts gave way to desperation with Germany's winning goal – "dear listeners, Rahn's shot is in the goal, in the right corner, six minutes before the end... The boys are standing there, distraught. The crowd screams. Six more minutes. The Hungarian team has played brilliantly – I cannot say anything else. My tears are flowing, but believe me, the boys gave it all." – and Puskás disallowed equalizer – "Puskás, you have the ball!!! SHOT!!! GOAL!!! ... OFFSIDE, offside; Griffiths indicated offside, my listeners, Griffiths has given offside – oh what a pity... what a pity". At the final whistle, Szepesi was fighting for composure: "end of the game. West Germany's team is World Champion. Dear listeners, it is hard for me to say anything, believe me... But let's recognize that the West Germans were very fair and won deservedly. ... We have been unbeaten for four years. Now we have lost. This is not a tragedy, my listeners... this is a defeat in a football match".

By contrast, Zimmermann kept expectations low at the outset, and continued in this vein after Hungary took the lead: "this is a great day, this is a proud day – let's not be so presumptuous to think it would have to end successfully". A measure of pride entered his voice after Germany's first – "today it is no 3–8. Today it is not a B-team. Today Germany's strongest squad is playing" – and second goal – "we have equalized, against Hungary, the technically most gifted squad that one knows!". Self-esteem grew as the match progressed – "six minutes still to play in Bern in the first half. Score: 2–2. This is more than what we dared to hope in our wildest dreams" – including after Buzánszky cleared Rahn's shot on the goal line: "now, dear Hungarians, we have to say: now you have been lucky". When Turek stopped Hidegkuti's volley from close range, Zimmermann famously called him a "god" and "devil" in the same sentence: "shot – saved by Turek! Turek, you are a dare-devil, Turek, you are a football god!".

Proverbial in Germany are Zimmermann's description of the winning goal – "Bozsik, time and again Bozsik, the right half-back of the Hungarians, with the ball. He has lost the ball this time, to Schäfer... Schäfer has crossed, header... cleared. From the deep Rahn ought to shoot – Rahn shoots – GOAL!! GOAL!! GOAL!! GOAL!! ... Goal for Germany! ... Call me crazy, call me mental, I believe also football laymen should have a heart!" – and his jubilation at the end of the match: "Over! Over! Over! ... Over! The game is over!". Zimmermann also complimented the Hungarian team: "Next to them stand the Hungarians... the Hungarians, calm, collected. Kudos to these boys, who can lose so gracefully, who have demonstrated to be true World Champions: when they once get beaten, they carry the defeat with dignity."

== Post-match and aftermath ==
=== Reaction in Hungary ===
The loss came at a shock to Hungarian public. Spontaneous demonstrations erupted in Budapest and were directed not only against the team, but also the communist-authoritarian regime controlled by general secretary Mátyás Rákosi, which had used the Golden Team's prestige to boost its own reputation. Goalkeeper Grosics characterized the post-match atmosphere in Hungary as follows:

"The reaction in Hungary was terrible. Hundreds of thousands of people poured into the streets in the hours after the match. On the pretext of football, they demonstrated against the regime ... in those demonstrations, I believe, lay the seeds of the 1956 uprising."

Sebes was severely criticized for the team's selection and tactics, and blamed the negative reaction in part on Szepesi's emotional radio report. Sebes achieved that Szepesi was temporarily removed from commenting football matches for the Hungarian State Radio. The authorities revoked player privileges, such as the tacit approval of smuggling Western goods back to Hungary. Grosics – who some Hungarians blamed for the third German goal – was accused of espionage and treason, put temporarily under house arrest, and transferred against his will from Budapest Honvéd FC to the provincial team FC Tatabánya.

=== Reaction in Germany ===
The unexpected win evoked a wave of euphoria throughout Germany, which suffered from a lack of international recognition in the aftermath of World War II, and where expressions of national pride were still tainted with the recent past. Some publicists described the 1954 victory as a turning point in post-war German history, notably Arthur Heinrich and Joachim Fest. In Fest's words:

"It was a kind of liberation for the Germans from all the things that weighed down upon them after the Second World War ... July 4, 1954 is in certain aspects the founding day of the German Republic."

This World Cup final was also the first time since the Second World War that the Germany national anthem was played at a global sporting event.

=== Mighty Magyars and Heroes of Bern after 1954 ===
Hungary's Golden Team remained largely intact until the failed Hungarian Revolution of 1956, except that coach Sebes was replaced with Bukovi in early 1956. After the revolution, Puskás, Czibor and Kocsis emigrated and, ultimately, continued their careers in Spain, playing for Real Madrid (Puskás) and FC Barcelona (Czibor and Kocsis), respectively. At the 1958 FIFA World Cup, only four players from the Mighty Magyars still featured – Bozsik, Budai, Grosics, Hidegkuti (Grosics would additionally play at the 1962 World Cup as captain of the team) – but were unable to repeat earlier success. In the 1960s and beyond, Hidegkuti, Puskás, and Lóránt became prominent international coaches, managing clubs such as Panathinaikos (Puskás), Fiorentina (Hidegkuti), and Bayern Munich (Lóránt). Lóránt's admission to the German Sport University Cologne was arranged by Herberger. Several other Golden Team members had success as coaches in the domestic Hungarian league.

The West German players became instantaneously famous in Germany as the Heroes of Bern. Several received lucrative offers to play abroad, but none accepted, continuing instead as semi-professionals in German clubs. Herberger overhauled the national team after the tournament. Hence, of the winning 1954 side, only Eckel, Rahn, Schäfer, and a 37-year old Fritz Walter still played at the 1958 World Cup, reaching the semi-finals, and Schäfer would also play in 1962. Few of the 1954 World Champions went into coaching; an exception is Liebrich, who is credited with saving his home club Kaiserslautern from Bundesliga relegation in 1965 – with Lóránt becoming Liebrich's successor in the following season. Some players had difficulties to cope with fame, and struggled at times with economic problems and alcoholism.

In 1990, after the fall of the Iron Curtain, the German Football Association invited the surviving members of Hungary's 1954 team to join celebrations for Fritz Walter's 70th birthday. In the years that followed, both teams organized annual get-togethers, which Grosics described as follows:

"I believe the friendship between the former Hungarian and German players can be called the world's most extraordinary. We met regularly over years and decades, alternately in Hungary and in Germany. I believe that these friendships were formed not only by the sport, but that high regard for the human beings also played a part. Between us such a relationship developed which, as I would like to stress once more, is unthinkable among national team players."

In January 2015, the last surviving of the Golden Hungarian team, Jenő Buzánszky, died. The last surviving player from the match, Horst Eckel, died on 3 December 2021.

== In film ==
- The Miracle of Bern (Das Wunder von Bern), a 2003 German film directed by Sönke Wortmann, had over six million cinema visitors.

== See also ==
- Germany at the FIFA World Cup
- Hungary at the FIFA World Cup

== Bibliography ==
- Escher, Tobias (2016). Vom Libero zur Doppelsechs – eine Taktikgeschichte des deutschen Fußballs (in German). Reinbek bei Hamburg: Rowohlt Taschenbuch Verlag. ISBN 978-3-499-63138-2.
- Heinrich, Arthur (2004). 3:2 für Deutschland – die Gründung der Bundesrepublik im Wankdorf-Stadion zu Bern (in German). Göttingen: Verlag Die Werkstatt. ISBN 978-3-89533-444-3.
- Kasza, Peter (2004). Fußball spielt Geschichte – das Wunder von Bern (in German). Berlin: be.bra verlag. ISBN 978-3-89809-046-9. Also published in Hungarian as: A Berni csoda – amikor a foci történelmet ír. Pécs: Alexandra.hu. 2004. ISBN 978-9633688236.
- Oswald, Rudolf (2006). "Emotionale 'Volksgemeinschaften': Das "Wunder von Bern" 1954 als Rundfunkereignis in Ungarn und Deutschland". In Bösch, Frank; Borutta, Manuel (eds.). Die Massen bewegen: Medien und Emotionen in der Moderne (in German). Frankfurt am Main: Campus Verlag. ISBN 978-3-593-38200-5.
- Puskás, Ferenc (1955). Captain of Hungary. Stroud, Gloucestershire: Cassell & Co.
- Raupp, Werner (2019). Toni Turek – "Fußballgott". Eine Biographie (in German). Hildesheim: Arete Verlag. ISBN 978-3-96423-008-9.
- Sebes, Gusztáv (1955). A magyar labdarúgás (in Hungarian). Budapest: Sport Lap- és Könyvkiadó. ASIN B0018CL3XW.
- Walter, Fritz (1954). 3:2 (in German). Munich: Copress Verlag in der Stiebner Verlag GmbH.
- Wilson, Jonathan (2013). Inverting the Pyramid – the History of Soccer Tactics. New York: Nation Books. ISBN 978-1-56858-738-7.
