= William Ling (referee) =

English association football referee

- Born: 1 August 1908; Hemel Hempstead, England
- Died: 8 May 1984 (aged 75); Moncton, New Brunswick, Canada

International
Years	League	Role
1948–1955	FIFA-listed	Referee

William Ling (1 August 1908 – 8 May 1984) was an English football referee from Stapleford, Cambridgeshire, who refereed the 1954 FIFA World Cup Final.

== Biography ==
The son of Mr. and Mrs. Hayden Ling, William Ling was born in Hemel Hempstead. During World War II he served as a major in British Army in Egypt. He worked his entire professional life in the printing trade when not refereeing or in military service. He was married to the Rev. Betty Griffiths-Ling, a minister in the United Church of Christ in 1978, and was heavily involved in church activities associated with that denomination. Ling had a daughter, Valerie, and two sons, William and Christopher. He died on 8 May 1984 in Moncton, New Brunswick, Canada and is buried at Greenwood Cemetery in Shediac.

== 1948 Olympic Games ==
Ling rose quickly through the ranks as a referee. He was initially on the supplementary list as a Football League match official but even so was selected to participate in the 1948 Olympic Games football tournament along with George Reader, Stanley Boardman and A. C. Williams from Brighton. Ling refereed both the first round match involving Sweden, the quarter-final involving Italy and was then selected for the final between Sweden and Yugoslavia. The final itself turned on two penalty decisions early in the second half (both of which were denied to the Yugoslavians) and which affected their temperament. Bernard Joy, in the 1960 publication "Association Football" (p.470), wrote: "The setbacks rattled the Yugoslavs, their behaviour got out of hand for a spell and they did not recover their rhythm. What made matters worse was when Gunnar Gren converted a penalty midway through the second half. It is true that Gunnar Nordahl was bowled over, but the offence looked no worse than those committed by the Swedish centre half Bertil Nordahl."

== 1951 FA Cup Final ==
By the start of the next season (1948–49) Ling had become a Football League referee, and within three years had been appointed to control an FA Cup Final.

Ling refereed the FA Cup Final in 1951, in which Newcastle United beat Blackpool 2–0, with two Jackie Milburn goals.

== 1954 World Cup ==
The 1954 World Cup was only his second international tournament not having been selected for the 1950 FIFA World Cup. He was one of a group of four referees appointed from the United Kingdom for the 1954 tournament. The others were Benjamin Mervyn Griffiths from Wales, Arthur Ellis from Yorkshire and Charles Edward Faultless (Scotland). In the course of the tournament, Ling had already refereed the Group match between Hungary and West Germany (in which the Hungarians had won 8–3 against the West German team of mainly reserve players) and had assisted Arthur Ellis during the Battle of Berne quarter-final. In the final he was assisted by Griffiths and the Italian Vincenzo Orlandini.

=== The Final ===
Ling's part in the World Cup final, between Hungary and West Germany, became controversial because he accepted linesman Griffith's offside flag in the final minutes to deny Ferenc Puskás a 3-3 equalizer that could have sent the game into extra-time. The final was latter dubbed the "Miracle of Bern," as West Germany came back from 2–0 down to win the match 3–2.

Willy Meisl observed, later, that it appeared that goal keeper Gyula Grosics had struck Ling following the final whistle. Nothing came of this incident and the mood amongst the Hungarians had settled when the trophy was handed to the West Germans.

== The Miracle of Bern ==
The final became the subject of the 2003 German film The Miracle of Bern, which tells the story of the match. Joachim Floryszak, a non-League German football referee and civil servant, starred as Ling after contacting the director Sönke Wortmann begging to be given a place in the film.

== Major matches refereed ==
Date	Match	Tournament	Venue	Result	Ref
13 August 1948	Sweden vs. Yugoslavia	1948 Summer Olympics, Men's Football Final	Empire Stadium, Wembley	3–1	
4 July 1954	West Germany vs. Hungary	1954 FIFA World Cup final	Wankdorf Stadium, Bern	3–2	

Preceded by (England) George Reader	FIFA World Cup final match referees 1954 (England) William Ling	Succeeded by (France) Maurice Guigue
Preceded by H. Pearce	FA Cup Final Referee; 1951	Succeeded by Arthur Ellis
