= Battle of Berne (1954 FIFA World Cup) =

1954 FIFA World Cup match between Hungary and Brazil

1954 FIFA World Cup Quarter-final
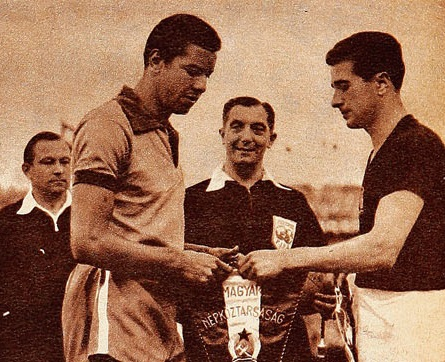
- Both captains prior to the match
- Event: 1954 FIFA World Cup
Hungary	Brazil
(Hungary)	(Brazil)
4	2
- Date: 27 June 1954
- Venue: Wankdorf Stadium, Bern
- Referee: Arthur Ellis (England)
- Attendance: 40,000

The Battle of Berne (Hungarian: Berni csata, Portuguese: Batalha de Berna, German: Schlacht bei Bern, French: Bataille de Berne, Italian: Battaglia di Berna, Romansh: Battaglia da Berna) was a football match at the 1954 World Cup between Hungary and Brazil, a quarter-final played on 27 June 1954 at the Wankdorf Stadium in Bern, Switzerland. Violent conduct and fighting prompted English referee Arthur Ellis to send off three players during the match. Fighting between the teams continued in the dressing rooms after the final whistle.

== Background ==
Brazil had scored six goals in two group games, and Hungary had scored 17. Brazil had a reputation for attractive and attacking football; in their games in group 1, they beat Mexico 5–0, and drew the other 1–1 with Yugoslavia after extra time.

Hungary had revolutionized football tactics and coaching in Europe. Their fluid and open style of play – an early form of total football – meant that they were unbeaten for 2 years, since defeat to Soviet Union on 27 May 1952. Hungary were clear winners of group 2, winning both of their group games – they beat South Korea 9–0, and West Germany 8–3.

For each of the first two quarter-finals, one team progressing from group 1 was drawn at random against one team progressing from group 2. Brazil were drawn to play against Hungary, while West Germany drew Yugoslavia.

== Match ==
=== Summary ===
The match was played in driving rain, producing slippery conditions and a hard to control ball. Hungary took the lead in the third minute, with Nándor Hidegkuti scoring. Four minutes later, Sándor Kocsis made it 2–0 to Hungary. Brazil was awarded a penalty; Djalma Santos scored to make it 2–1 at half time.

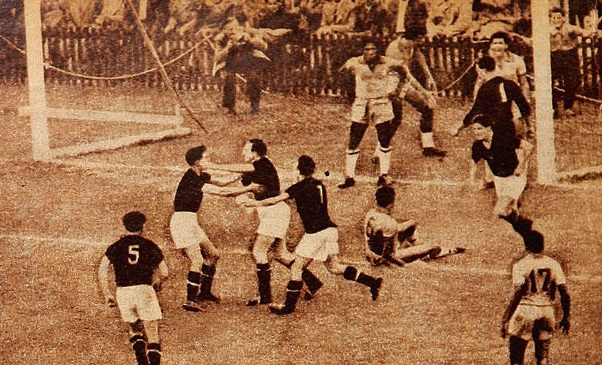
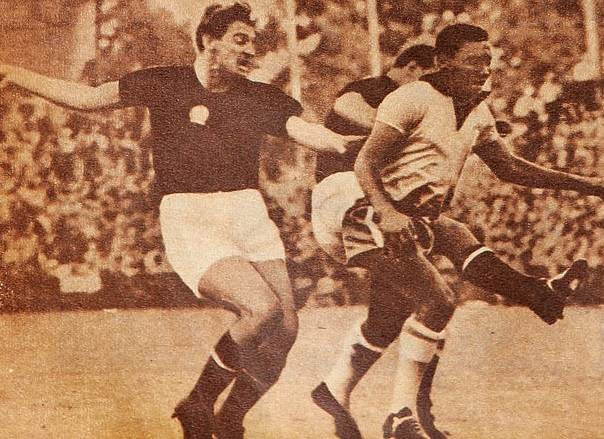
Two moments of the match

In the second half, Hungary was awarded a penalty; Mihály Lantos scored to make the score 3–1. The penalty award was the cue for a pitch invasion by Brazilian journalists and officials, who had to be ushered off by police. The game then degenerated into a series of increasingly violent fouls and cynical tactics, with Brazilian forward Julinho scoring to bring the score to 3–2. After this, József Bozsik was fouled by Nilton Santos; the two men started fighting, and both were sent off. Hungary scored a fourth goal via Sándor Kocsis to make the score 4–2 to Hungary. The last moments of the game was little more than a running battle between the two teams; Brazilian forward Humberto Tozzi kicked Hungary's Gyula Lóránt prior to the final whistle and was sent off.

In total, 42 free kicks and 2 penalties were awarded, with 4 cautions and 3 dismissals issued.

The ill-temper continued after the game, with the Brazilian players invading the Hungarian dressing room and continuing the on-pitch fighting. They were driven off by the notorious Hungarian AVH security police with batons and guns drawn. Despite evidence from independent witnesses of violent conduct from both sides, football's governing body FIFA did nothing, leaving discipline to the respective countries.

=== Details ===
27 June 1954
17:00 CET

Hungary	4–2	Brazil
Hidegkuti 4'; Kocsis 7', 88'; Lantos 60' (pen.)		Djalma Santos 18' (pen.); Julinho 65'

Wankdorf Stadium, Bern
Attendance: 40,000
Referee: Arthur Ellis (England)

Hungary
Brazil

GK	1	Gyula Grosics
RB	2	Jenő Buzánszky
CH	3	Gyula Lóránt
LB	4	Mihály Lantos
RH	5	József Bozsik (c)	(red card) 71'
LH	6	József Zakariás
OR	7	József Tóth
IR	8	Sándor Kocsis
SS	9	Nándor Hidegkuti
IL	11	Zoltán Czibor
OL	20	Mihály Tóth
Manager:
(Hungary) Gusztáv Sebes

GK	1	Castilho
RB	2	Djalma Santos
CH	5	Pinheiro
LB	3	Nílton Santos	(red card) 71'
RH	4	Brandãozinho
LH	6	Bauer (c)
OR	7	Julinho
IR	8	Didi
CF	19	Índio
IL	18	Humberto	(red card) 79'
OL	17	Maurinho
Manager:
(Brazil) Zezé Moreira

Assistant referees:
(England) William Ling
(Switzerland) Raymon Wyssling

== Post-match commentary ==
The game's referee Arthur Ellis commented: "I thought it was going to be the greatest game I'd ever see. I was on top of the world. Whether politics and religion had something to do with it I don't know, but they behaved like animals. It was a disgrace. It was a horrible match. Certainly British players and fans would never act in such a most reprehensible manner. In today's climate so many players would have been sent off the game would have been abandoned. My only thought was that I was determined to finish it." Ellis later wrote, "Those people must learn sportsmanship and we must teach them. South Americans are more excitable and more passionate than we are. Even more so than the Italians. Unlike the British, they do crazy things, impulsively, then a few minutes later they are genuinely and deeply sorry".

The Times newspaper correspondent on 28 June 1954 drew a similar conclusion; "Never in my life have I seen such cruel tackling, the cutting down of opponents as if with a scythe, followed by threatening attitudes and sly jabs when officialdom was engaged elsewhere." Ellis's officiating and gentlemanly conduct was commended by the Daily Mail.

"This was a battle; a brutal, savage match," recalled Hungary manager Gusztáv Sebes, who needed four stitches for a facial wound received during the fighting. "At the end we had won 4–2 but it wasn't over yet. Brazilian photographers and fans flooded on to the pitch and police were called to clear it. Players clashed in the tunnel and a small war broke out in the corridor to the dressing rooms - everyone was having a go; fans, players and officials."

The draw for the semi-finals, held on Sunday 27 June, was delayed by a complaint from the Hungarian team concerning the manner in which the quarter-final against Brazil had been played.

== See also ==
- Battle of Bordeaux (1938)
- Battle of Lusail (2022)
- Battle of Nuremberg (2006)
- Battle of Santiago (1962)
- Brazil at the FIFA World Cup
- Hungary at the FIFA World Cup
