= Toni Turek =

German footballer (1919–1984)

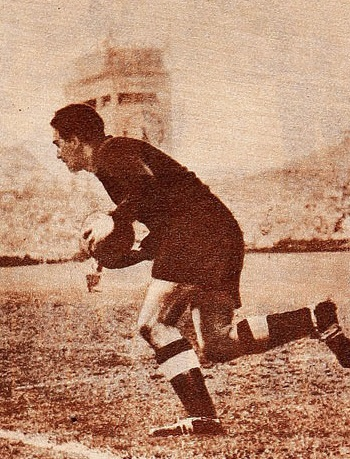
- Turek in 1954

Personal information
- Full name: Anton Turek
- Date of birth: 18 January 1919
- Place of birth: Duisburg, Germany
- Date of death: 11 May 1984 (aged 65)
- Place of death: Neuss, West Germany
- Height: 1.81 m (5 ft 11 in)
- Position: Goalkeeper

Youth career
- 1929–1936: Duisburger SV

Senior career*
| Years | Team | Apps | (Gls) |
| 1936–1941 | TuS Duisburg 48/99 | | |
| 1941–1943 | TSG Ulm 1846 | | |
| 1943–1946 | TuS Duisburg 48/99 | | |
| 1946–1947 | Eintracht Frankfurt | 22 | (0) |
| 1947–1950 | TSG Ulm 1846 | 65 | (0) |
| 1950–1956 | Fortuna Düsseldorf | 133 | (0) |
| 1956–1957 | Borussia Mönchengladbach | 4 | (0) |

International career
| 1950–1954 | West Germany | 20 | (0) |
Medal record
Representing West Germany
FIFA World Cup
| Winner | 1954 Switzerland |
- * Club domestic league appearances and goals

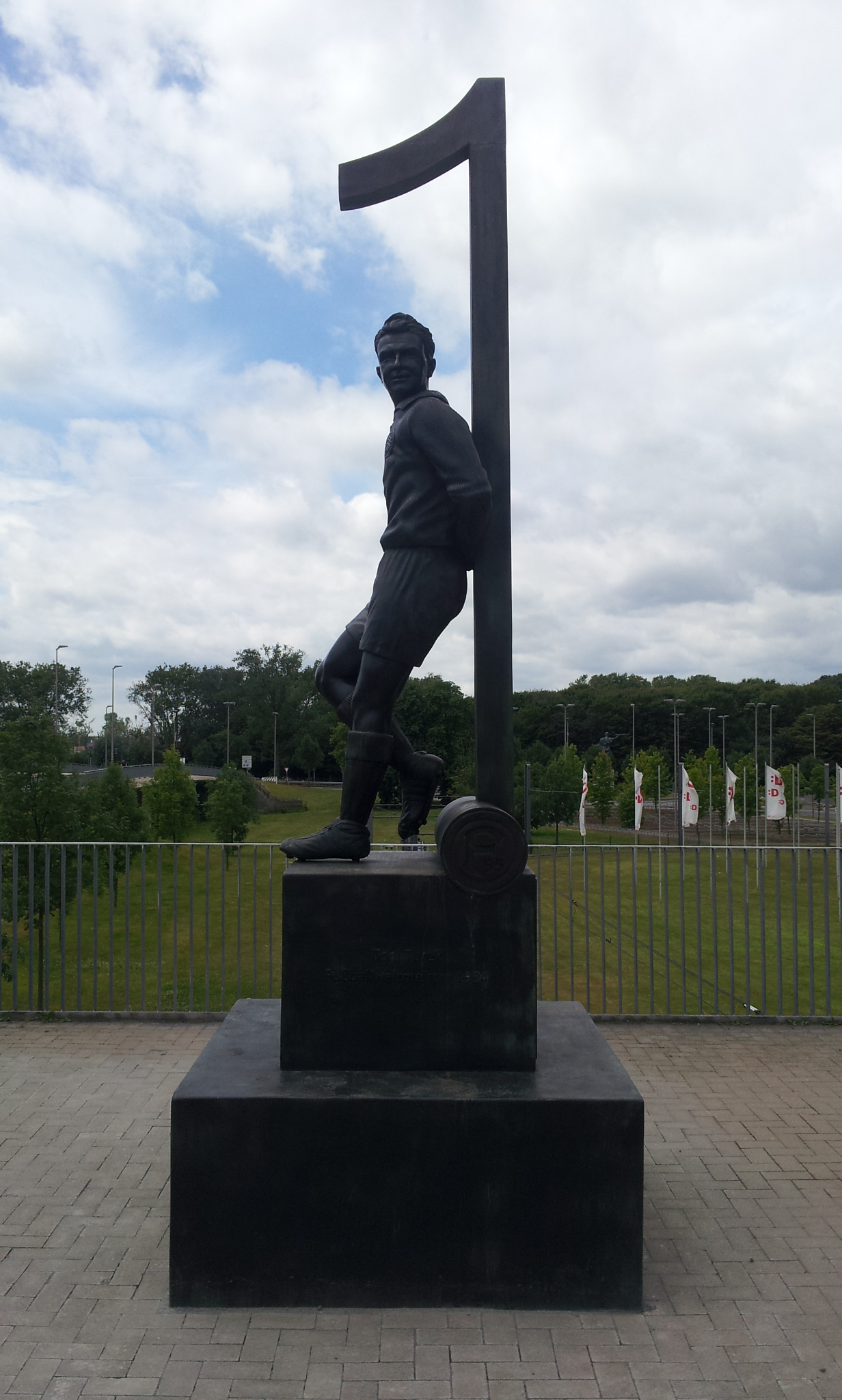
Bronze statue by Toni Turek next to the Merkur Spiel-Arena in Düsseldorf-Stockum.

Anton Turek (18 January 1919 – 11 May 1984) was a German footballer who played as a goalkeeper.

== Career ==
Born in Duisburg, Turek started his career at Duisburger Sportverein, but he soon moved to TuS Duisburg 48/99. He first came to the attention of later West Germany national team coach Sepp Herberger was on 27 September 1936, when West Germany played a preparation game against Luxembourg in Krefeld. Before that game, the youth teams of Krefeld and TuS Duisburg 48/99 had met with the 17-year-old Turek standing in the Duisburg goal. During World War II Turek was lucky things did not turn out worse for him as a shell splinter struck through his helmet.

In 1950 Turek transferred to Fortuna Düsseldorf. Between 1950 and 1954 he played 20 games for the West Germany national team. He played in "The Miracle of Bern" 1954 FIFA World Cup final against Hungary and won the Championship.

After a fine save from a very close shot by Nándor Hidegkuti, he was described by the sports reporter Herbert Zimmermann with the words "Toni, you're a football God". He later had to apologize for that comment because the church complained about the comparison of a football player with God.

== Death ==
Turek died in Neuss in 1984. He had been paralyzed from the waist down since August 1973.

== Legacy ==
He has received numerous honours and is still highly regarded in Germany, especially in the Rhineland.
