= Mihály Tóth (footballer, born 1926) =

Hungarian footballer

Personal information
- Full name: Mihály Tóth
- Date of birth: 14 September 1926
- Place of birth: Bezdan, Kingdom of SCS
- Date of death: 7 March 1990 (aged 63)
- Place of death: Budapest, Hungary
- Height: 1.63 m (5 ft 4 in)
- Position: Forward

Senior career*
Years	Team	Apps	(Gls)
1944–1963	Újpesti Dózsa	238	(41)

International career
1949–1957	Hungary	6	(1)
Medal record
Representing Hungary
FIFA World Cup
Runner-up	1954 Switzerland
- * Club domestic league appearances and goals as of 15 September 2006

Mihály Tóth (born Mihalj Tot - Михаљ Тот - in Bezdan, Kingdom of SCS, 14 September 1926 – Budapest, Hungary, 7 March 1990), was a Hungarian football player during the 1950s and early 1960s. He played for Újpesti Dózsa as a left winger and helped the club win the Nemzeti Bajnokság I in 1959/60. During his time the club was also known as Újpest TE and Budapest Dózsa.

Between 1949 and 1957, Tóth played 6 times for Hungary and scored one goal in the process. The fringe member of the Mighty Magyars also took part in the 1954 World Cup, and played in both the infamous Battle of Berne quarter final against Brazil and in the final against Germany.

== Honours ==
- Hungarian Champions: 1
  - 1959/60
