= Gyula Lóránt =

Hungarian footballer and manager (1923–1981)

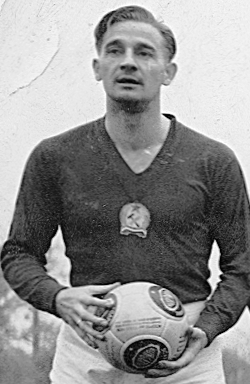
- Lóránt in 1953

Personal information
- Birth name: Gyula Lipovics
- Date of birth: 6 February 1923
- Place of birth: Kőszeg, Hungary
- Date of death: 31 May 1981 (aged 58)
- Place of death: Thessaloniki, Greece
- Height: 1.85 m (6 ft 1 in)
- Positions: Defender; midfielder

Youth career
- 1939–1941: Kőszeg SE
- 1941–1942: Szombathelyi Haladás

Senior career*
Years	Team	Apps	(Gls)
1942–1943	Szombathelyi Haladás		
1943–1944	Nagyváradi AC	28	(12)
1944	Nemzeti Vasas	7	(0)
1945	Libertatea Oradea	9	(1)
1946–1947	ITA Arad	20	(0)
1947–1950	Vasas	82	(1)
1951–1956	Honvéd	85	(0)
1956	Budapest Spartacus		
1956–1957	Váci Vasas		
Total		231	(14)

International career
1948–1955	Hungary	37	(0)

Managerial career
- 1962–1963: Honvéd
- 1963: Debrecen
- 1964: SV Rheydt
- 1965–1967: 1. FC Kaiserslautern
- 1967–1968: MSV Duisburg
- 1968–1969: Tasmania Berlin
- 1969–1971: 1. FC Kaiserslautern
- 1971–1972: 1. FC Köln
- 1972–1974: Kickers Offenbach
- 1974: Freiburger FC
- 1975–1976: PAOK
- 1976–1977: Eintracht Frankfurt
- 1977–1978: Bayern Munich
- 1979: Schalke 04
- 1980–1981: PAOK
Medal record
Representing Hungary
Olympic Games
Gold medal – first place	1952 Helsinki
FIFA World Cup
Runner-up	1954 Switzerland
Central European International Cup
Winner	1948–53 Central Europe
- * Club domestic league appearances and goals

Gyula Lóránt (born Gyula Lipovics, 6 February 1923 – 31 May 1981) was a Hungarian footballer and manager of Croatian descent. He played as a defender and midfielder for, among others, UTA Arad, Vasas SC, Honvéd and the Hungary national team.

Regarded as one of the greatest Hungarian players of all time, Lóránt was a prominent member of the legendary Hungarian national team during the 1950s, known as the Mighty Magyars, which also included Ferenc Puskás, Zoltán Czibor, Sándor Kocsis, József Bozsik and Nándor Hidegkuti.

After retiring as a player, Lóránt pursued a managerial career, serving in various clubs like Honvéd, Kaiserslautern, Köln, Eintracht Frankfurt, Bayern Munich, Schalke 04 and PAOK Thessaloniki among others.

== Early years and private life ==
Born with the name Gyula Lipovics in Kőszeg on 6 February 1923, he was the son of a police officer. He grew up with his older brother Károly (born in 1921) and his younger brother Imre (born in 1925). Their family name was changed to Lóránt in 1928. He started his education at a Catholic school and then attended Benedictine Gymnasium in Kőszeg, where they placed great emphasis on physical education and sports. He also studied at the Commercial School in Szombathely and he obtained his high school diploma in 1943. He was married twice. His first wife was named Ibolya and the second Zsófia. He had an adopted daughter, Éva Adrienne (born in 1943) and a biological daughter named Eszter (born in 1956).

== Playing career ==
Gyula Lóránt began his football career at the age of 16, playing for his hometown club, Kőszeg SE. He then played for Szombathelyi Haladás and subsequently moved to Nagyváradi AC, winning the Hungarian Championship in 1944. In 1947, he won the Romanian Championship with UTA Arad. It was while at Vasas SC, with Ladislao Kubala as a teammate, that his career prospered. However, in January 1949, Hungary became a communist state and Kubala fled the country in the back of a truck. He formed his own team, Hungaria, which was made up of fellow refugees fleeing Eastern Europe. Lóránt also planned to flee the country with three other footballers - Béla Egresi, József Mészáros and Károly Kéri - but was arrested by the State Protection Authority and imprisoned with his companions in the Kistarcsa Central Internment Camp.

=== Hungarian international ===
Lóránt made his international debut on 24 October 1948 in a 5–1 away win against Romania. In early 1949, his career was put into a halt due to his imprisonment and he was released from detention after the intervention of Gusztáv Sebes, the Hungary national team coach, who considered him pivotal for the creation of a strong national side. Sebes wanted Lóránt to participate in a friendly match against Austria and he personally guaranteed to the country's Interior Minister János Kádár, that his player would not abscond while in Vienna. Kádár consented and Lóránt responded with a solid performance as Hungary won the game 4–3 on 16 October 1949. He subsequently joined Honvéd, where together with six of his fellow internationals, they won three Hungarian League titles. Playing as a central defender in the legendary Mighty Magyars, he helped Hungary to become Olympic gold medalists in 1952, to win the Central European International Cup in 1953, to crush England twice in friendly encounters and to reach the 1954 FIFA World Cup Final. Lóránt had 37 caps in total for the Hungary national team between 1948 and 1955.

National team	Year	Caps
Hungary
Hungary	1948	2
Hungary	1949	3
Hungary	1950	2
Hungary	1952	9
Hungary	1953	6
Hungary	1954	12
Hungary	1955	3
Total		37

== Managerial career ==
After the end of his football career, Lóránt was accepted at the Hungarian University of Sports Science (TF) and in 1961, he obtained his coaching qualification. He pursued a managerial career, guiding teams such as Honvéd, Kaiserslautern, Köln, Eintracht Frankfurt, Bayern Munich, Schalke 04 and PAOK Thessaloniki among others. In 1965, he completed the coaching course at the renowned German Sport University of Cologne (DSHS). Lóránt quickly gained a reputation as a coach who implemented hard training in order to improve his teams' stamina and demanded discipline and tactical commitment from his players. During his tenure as Kaiserslautern manager (1965–67 and 1969–71), a member of the squad was Otto Rehhagel, a tough defender, as Lóránt himself had been in the past. In 1973, the Hungarian was on the bench of Kickers Offenbach and for 39 matches he had Otto as his assistant, who was then taking his first steps in coaching. Rehhagel took over as Kickers' head coach after Lóránt's departure and has stated that he considers him his mentor.

"Bundesliga matches are not like Russian elections where you can always win."

— Gyula Lóránt during his Bundesliga time

With PAOK, Lóránt won the Greek Championship in 1976, the first in the club's history, having 21 wins, 7 draws and two losses in thirty matches. PAOK finished the season having the best overall attack and defense in the league and also recorded some impressive wins, such as a 0–4 away victory over Olympiacos at Karaiskakis Stadium. In order to renew his contract, Lóránt demanded from PAOK president Giorgos Pantelakis to provide the team with a proper training ground, to organize better the youth ranks' infrastructure, a transfer budget increase and a higher annual salary for himself. His requests were denied and Lóránt departed from Thessaloniki. In November, he was appointed at Eintracht Frankfurt, who were ranked 16th in the Bundesliga at the time. With an impressive 21-match unbeaten run, Lóránt led Eintracht to a 4th-place finish and qualification for the following season's UEFA Cup, ending up two points behind champions Borussia Mönchengladbach. Jürgen Grabowski, considered one of the greatest Eintracht Frankfurt players ever, recounted in an interview how Lóránt introduced to the team from the first training session an early form of zonal marking, a defensive strategy that was considered revolutionary back then, writing down the players' names on a blackboard and drawing chack lines. He later coached Bayern Munich and Schalke 04, before returning to PAOK in the spring of 1980.

== Death ==
Lóránt died on 31 May 1981, aged 58, while coaching PAOK from the bench during a derby against Olympiacos at Toumba Stadium. He suffered a heart attack in the 16th minute of the match after PAOK's Giorgos Koudas headed a cross wide from close range. Attempts were made to resuscitate him on the spot and he was subsequently moved to the medical room, but passed away before the ambulance arrived. PAOK players were told in the half-time break that he had to be transported to the hospital and his death was revealed to them only after the game ended. PAOK eventually won the match 1–0 with the goal of the substitute Vassilis Vasilakos who was sitting next to Lóránt on the bench when he collapsed. The autopsy revealed that he had already suffered at least two other heart attacks in the past, with the last occurring approximately a week before his death.

Lóránt was buried in Endingen, southern Germany. In May 2011, at the initiative of his widow and daughter, his remains were transported to Hungary and laid to rest in his birth town, Kőszeg. The Kőszeg City Museum held a memorial service at the reburial. During the ceremony, a letter by Prime Minister Viktor Orbán was read out and Gyula Lóránt was posthumously promoted to the rank of Major by the Minister of Defence, Csaba Hende. The city of Kőszeg honored his memory through various ways. In 1996, the Kőszeg sports centre, where visitors can see his memorial stone, was named after him. In 1997, a memorial plaque was unveiled at his birthplace and in 1998, the posthumous Honorary Citizen Award was granted to him by the town. In 2004, a street was named after him.

== Honours and awards ==
=== Player ===
Hungary

- Olympic Games: 1952 (gold) gold medal
- Central European International Cup: 1948–53
- FIFA World Cup runner-up: 1954

Nagyváradi AC

- Hungarian Championship: 1944

UTA Arad

- Romanian Championship: 1947

Honvéd

- Hungarian Championship: 1952, 1954, 1955

=== Manager ===
PAOK

- Greek Championship: 1976

=== Individual ===
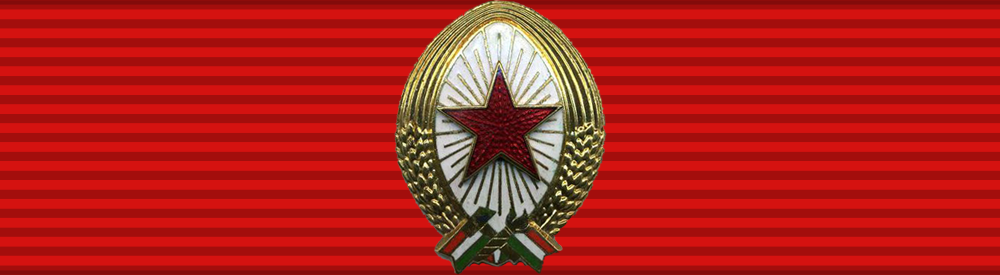
- Order of Labor Merit of the Hungarian People's Republic (1953)
- Meritorious Athlete of the Hungarian People's Republic (1954)
- Posthumous honorary citizen of Kőszeg (1998)
- Posthumous member of the Vas County Immortals Club (1999)
- Posthumously promoted to the rank of Major in the Hungarian Defence Forces (2011)

== Sources ==
- Behind The Curtain – Travels in Eastern European Football: Jonathan Wilson (2006)
- Gyula Lóránt at eintracht-archiv.de
