= Richard Herrmann =

German footballer

Personal information
- Full name: Richard Franz Herrmann
- Date of birth: 28 January 1923
- Place of birth: Katowice, Poland
- Date of death: 27 July 1962 (aged 39)
- Height: 1.67 m (5 ft 5 1/2 in)
- Position: Striker

Senior career*
| Years | Team | Apps | (Gls) |
| 1934–1945 | 1. FC Kattowitz | | |
| 1947–1960 | FSV Frankfurt | | |

International career
| 1950–1954 | West Germany | 8 | (1) |
Medal record
Representing West Germany
FIFA World Cup
| Winner | 1954 Switzerland |
- * Club domestic league appearances and goals

Richard Herrmann (28 January 1923 – 27 July 1962) was a German football player. He played for the clubs 1. FC Kattowitz (1934–1945) and FSV Frankfurt (1947–1960).

He was part of the West Germany team which won the 1954 FIFA World Cup. He scored a goal in the first round 3–8 defeat by Hungary. However, this was the only match he played in the tournament, and he did not play in the final victory against Hungary. In total he played eight matches for Germany.

After World War II Herrmann was a prisoner of war first in England, then in the United States before being sent back to camp 1008 in Derby, England. Football was being played in that camp and the officials of Derby County were told that there was a talented German POW. However Herrmann intended to get back to Germany as soon as possible. When released in 1947, one of his comrades in camp 1008, the pressman Alfred Ludwig attended to Herrmann and took him along to Frankfurt, where he joined FSV Frankfurt.

Gifted with great ball control and a precise shot, Herrmann soon became a starter for FSV as an outside left. In 1952 AC Torino offered 60,000 D-Mark to Herrmann, but he declined due to being married with a son. Instead he rented a little smoke shop and an outlet for football beds. In 1958 Herrmann ended his career after a bad injury at the age of 35 and began coaching Seckbach 05 for a while. He died from a liver cirrhosis at the age of 39.

This disease stemmed from an acute hepatitis virus that was transmitted during the 1954 World Cup by means of contaminated syringes containing vitamin C or the methamphetamine Pervitin (also known as Hitler's "miracle pill" or "panzer-chocolate"). The injections were given by the team doctor Franz Loogen, which caused long-term liver damage ("hepatitis C") to hit a large part of the national team.
