= Mihály Lantos =

Hungarian football player and manager (1928–1989)

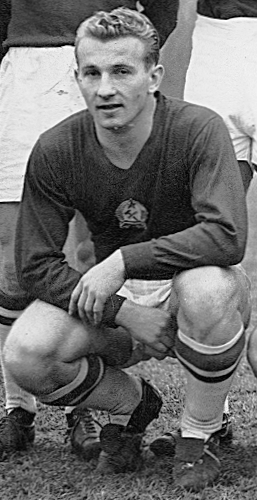
- Lantos with Hungary in 1953

Personal information
- Date of birth: 29 September 1928
- Place of birth: Budapest, Hungary
- Date of death: 31 December 1989 (aged 61)
- Place of death: Budapest, Hungary
- Height: 1.77 m (5 ft 10 in)
- Position: Defender

Senior career*
Years	Team	Apps	(Gls)
1941–1943	Budapesti MÁVAG SK		
1943–1944	BVSC Budapest		
1945	MÁV Konzum Előre		
1945–1947	Vasutas Előre SC		
1948–1961	MTK Hungária FC	290	(38)

International career
1949–1956	Hungary	52	(5)

Managerial career
- 1965–1967: Olympiacos (assistant manager)
- 1968–1975: Komlói Bányász
- 1975–1977: Nagykanizsai Olajbányász
- 1977–1980: Videoton FC
- 1980–1981: Zalaegerszegi TE
Medal record
Representing Hungary
Olympic Games
Gold medal – first place	1952 Helsinki
FIFA World Cup
Runner-up	1954 Switzerland
- * Club domestic league appearances and goals

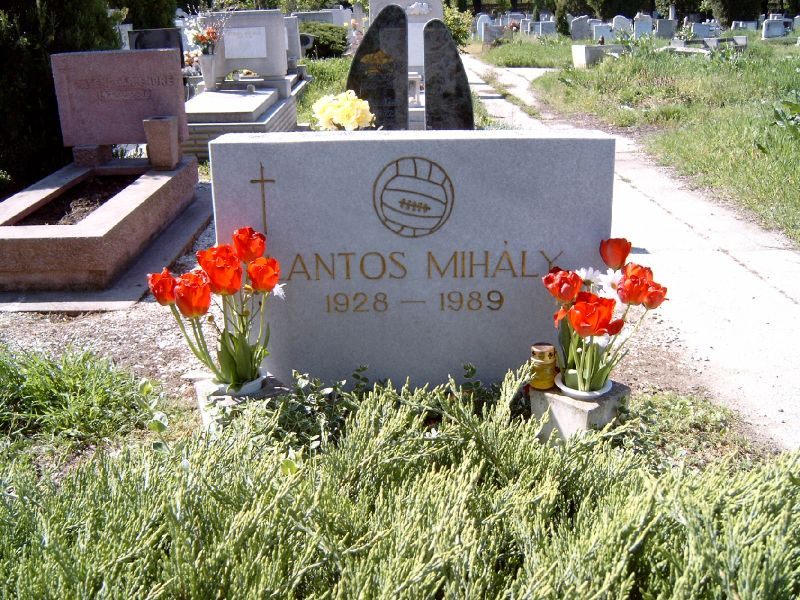
Grave stone of Mihály Lantos

Mihály Lantos (born Mihály Lendenmayer, 29 September 1928 – 31 December 1989) was a Hungarian football player and manager. He played as a defender, spending the majority of his career at MTK Hungária FC. During the 1950s he was also a member of the Hungary team known as the Golden Team. Other members of the team included Nándor Hidegkuti, Ferenc Puskás, Zoltán Czibor, Sándor Kocsis and József Bozsik. After retiring as a player Lantos worked as coach. Between 1965 and 1967 he was assistant coach to his former MTK manager, Márton Bukovi, at Olympiacos. He then returned to Hungary where he managed several teams including Videoton FC.

== Club career ==
MTK Hungária FC

Lantos began playing for MTK in 1948. In 1949 when Hungary became a communist state, MTK were taken over by the secret police, the ÁVH and the club subsequently changed their name several times. Initially they became Textiles SE, then Bástya SE, then Vörös Lobogó SE and then finally back to MTK. Despite this turmoil, the 1950s proved a successful era for club and under coach Márton Bukovi and with a team that also included Nándor Hidegkuti, Péter Palotás and József Zakariás, MTK and Lantos won three Hungarian League titles, a Hungarian Cup and a Mitropa Cup. In 1955, as Vörös Lobogó SE, they also played in the first ever European Cup. Lantos, scoring three goals, including two penalties, helped the club reach the quarter-finals.

== International career ==
Between 1949 and 1956, Lantos won 52 caps and scored 5 goals for Hungary. He made his international debut on 10 July 1949 in an 8–2 win against Poland. As one of the Mighty Magyars, he helped Hungary become Olympic Champions in 1952, Central European Champions in 1953 and defeat England twice. He scored the opening goal as Hungary beat England 7–1 on 23 May 1954. He then helped Hungary reach the 1954 World Cup final. During the World Cup finals he played all five games for Hungary, scoring in the opening 9–0 win against South Korea and in the bruising Battle of Berne quarter-final encounter against Brazil.

== Honours ==
=== Club ===
MTK Hungária FC

- Hungarian League (3): 1951, 1953, 1958
- Hungarian Cup: 1952
- Mitropa Cup: 1955

=== International ===
Hungary

- Olympic Champions: 1952
- Central European Champions: 1953
- World Cup Runner-up: 1954
