= 1954 FIFA World Cup =

Association football tournament in Switzerland

Fussball-Weltmeisterschaft Schweiz 1954 (German) Championnat du Monde de Football Suisse 1954 (French) Campionato mondiale di calcio Svizzera 1954 (Italian) Campiunadis mundials da ballape Svizra 1954 (Romansh)

Tournament details
- Host country: Switzerland
- Dates: 16 June – 4 July
- Teams: 16 (from 4 confederations)
- Venues: 6 (in 6 host cities)

Final positions
- Champions: West Germany (1st title)
- Runners-up: Hungary
- Third place: Austria
- Fourth place: Uruguay

Tournament statistics
- Matches played: 26
- Goals scored: 140 (5.38 per match)
- Attendance: 768,607 (29,562 per match)
- Top scorer: (Hungary) Sándor Kocsis (11 goals)

The 1954 FIFA World Cup was the fifth edition of the FIFA World Cup, the quadrennial international football tournament for senior men's national teams of the nations affiliated to FIFA. It was held in Switzerland from 16 June to 4 July. Switzerland was selected as the host country in July 1946. At the tournament, several all-time records for goalscoring were set, including the highest average number of goals scored per game. The tournament was won by West Germany, who defeated tournament favourites Hungary 3–2 in the final for their first World Cup title. Uruguay, the defending champions, were eliminated by Hungary in the semi-finals and would lose to Austria in the match for third place.

The highest scoring match of a men's World Cup happened in the quarter-finals of this tournament, when Austria defeated hosts Switzerland 7–5.

== Host selection ==
Switzerland was awarded the tournament unopposed at a meeting in Luxembourg City on 22 July 1946, the same day Brazil was selected to host the 1950 World Cup.

== Qualification ==
The hosts (Switzerland) and the defending champions (Uruguay) qualified automatically. Of the remaining 14 places, 11 were allocated to Europe (including Egypt, Turkey, and Israel), two to the Americas, and one to Asia.

Scotland, Turkey, and South Korea made their World Cup debuts at this tournament (Turkey and Scotland had qualified for the 1950 competition but both withdrew). South Korea became the first independent Asian country to participate in a World Cup tournament. Austria appeared following a hiatus from 1934. Several teams, such as Hungary and Czechoslovakia were back into the tournament after missing out the 1950 World Cup.

German teams as well as Japan were allowed to qualify again, after having been banned from the 1950 FIFA World Cup. West Germany qualified against fellow Germans from the Saarland (which then was a French protectorate), while East Germany did not enter, having cancelled international football matches after the East German uprising of 1953. Argentina declined to participate for the third successive World Cup.

=== List of qualified teams ===
The following 16 teams qualified for the final tournament.

Asia (1)

- South Korea (debut)

North America (1)

- Mexico

South America (2)

- Brazil
- Uruguay (holders)

Europe (12)

- Austria
- Belgium
- Czechoslovakia
- England
- France
- Hungary
- Italy
- Scotland (debut)
- Switzerland (hosts)
- Turkey (debut)
- West Germany
- Yugoslavia

== Summary ==
=== Format ===
==== Group stage ====
The 1954 tournament used a unique format. The sixteen qualified teams were divided into four groups of four teams each. Each group contained two seeded teams and two unseeded teams. Only four matches were scheduled for each group, each pitting a seeded team against an unseeded team. This contrasts with the usual round-robin in which every team plays every other team: six matches in each group. Another oddity was that extra time, which in most tournaments is not employed at the group stage, was played in the group games if the score was level after 90 minutes, with the result being a draw if the scores were still level after 120 minutes.

Two points were awarded for a win and one for a draw. The two teams with the most points from each group progressed to the knockout stage. In the case of a tie between two teams for second place, the two tied teams competed in a play-off to decide which team would progress to the next stage, with extra time and drawing of lots if necessary. Had all four teams in a group been tied on points, there would have been two further play-offs – one play-off between the two seeded teams, and the other between the two unseeded teams, again with extra time and drawing of lots if necessary – with the winner of each play-off progressing to the quarter-finals.

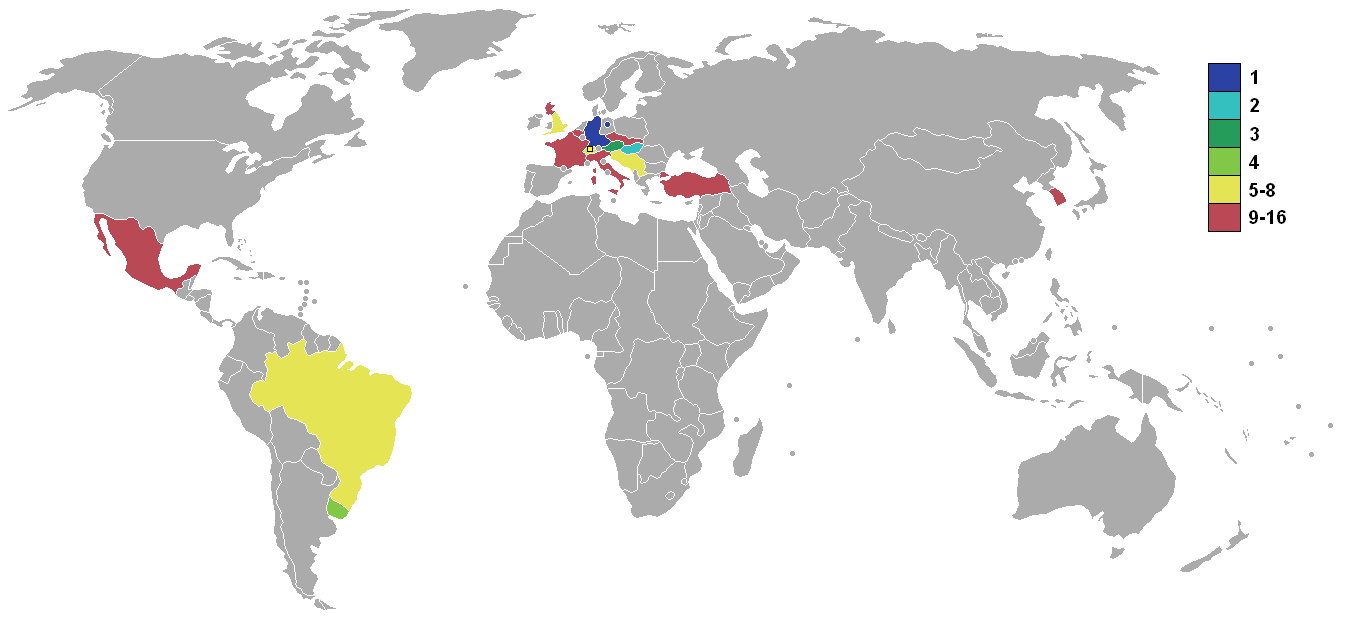
Qualified countries

Two of the four groups ended up requiring play-offs – one between Switzerland and Italy, and the other between Turkey and West Germany. In each match, the unseeded team (Switzerland and West Germany) repeated an earlier victory against the seeded team (Italy and Turkey) to progress. The fact that two group matches were played twice, while other group opponents never faced each other at all, attracted criticism; newly elected FIFA President Rodolphe Seeldrayers declared that this group format would be abandoned in future world cups.

==== Quarter-finals ====
For each of the first two quarter-finals, one team progressing from group 1 was drawn against one team progressing from group 2. For the remaining two quarter-finals, this procedure was repeated for groups 3 and 4. Before the tournament, it was stated that in the event of a quarter-final being tied after 90 minutes, 30 minutes of extra time would be played, followed by drawing of lots if necessary. Later, it was stated that a quarter-final could be replayed in this situation. The draw was scheduled to be held on Sunday 20 June, though in fact it was delayed into the early morning of Monday 21 June.

==== Semi-finals ====
For the semi-finals, a further draw was held, with each semi-final featuring one team from groups 1–2 against one team from groups 3–4. In the event of a semi-final being tied after extra time, it would be replayed once, followed by drawing of lots if necessary.

The draw for the semi-finals, held on Sunday 27 June, was delayed by a complaint from the Hungarian team concerning the manner in which their quarter-final against Brazil had been played.

==== Final ====
The final would be replayed if scores were level after extra-time. If the replay was also tied, the winner would be decided by the tournament organising committee, or by drawing of lots.

=== Seeding ===
Before qualification was complete, the eight seeded teams were determined by FIFA. They were Austria, Brazil, England, France, Hungary, Italy, Spain, and Uruguay.

These seedings were thrown into disarray when, in an unexpected result, Turkey eliminated Spain in qualification. FIFA resolved this situation by giving Turkey the seeding that had previously been allocated to Spain.

=== Notable results ===
The Germany national football team, then limited to the area of West Germany only, had been reinstated as full FIFA members only in late 1950, had played only 18 games since, and were unseeded. When meeting the seeded Turkish side at Wankdorf stadium in Berne, the Turks scored early, but the Germans convincingly won the encounter, which would turn out as the first of two within six days.

The South Koreans, the other unseeded team, lost 7–0 and 9–0 against the seeded sides of Hungary and Turkey. West Germany, being denied the chance to play such an easy opponent, had to face the seeded team of Hungary, a favourite to win the World Cup. Sepp Herberger, the West German coach, did not want his A-squad to suffer a possible defeat against a strong opponent while trying to qualify for a rather meaningless first place, and gambled by going the easier route into the play-offs and sending in a reserve side which lost 8–3 in Basel. A benefit was that the Hungarians did not get to know the best German players in case both teams would meet again - which they did, in the final, along with referee William Ling. Now two teams were tied for second place on 2 points, and with no tie breaking procedures in effect, even though West Germany had beaten Turkey head-to-head, they had to play-off against each other, a match-up that West Germany easily won for the second time within six days, this time in Zürich.

Hungary's team captain Ferenc Puskás, considered by many as the best player in the world in that time, was injured by West German defender Werner Liebrich, and had to miss Hungary's next two matches. Puskás played for Hungary in the final, despite still being in a questionable condition.

In the quarter-finals, the favourites Hungary beat Brazil 4–2 in one of the most violent matches in football history, which became infamous as the Battle of Berne. Meanwhile, the World Cup holders Uruguay sent England out of the tournament, also by 4–2. West Germany dispatched Yugoslavia 2–0, and Austria beat the host nation Switzerland in the game with the most goals in any World Cup match, 7–5.

In the first semi-final, West Germany beat Austria 6–1.

In the other semi-final, one of the most exciting games of the tournament, Hungary led Uruguay 1–0 at halftime, but the game went to extra time with a 2–2 score after 90 minutes. The deadlock was broken by Sándor Kocsis with two late goals to take Hungary through to the final, with Uruguay finally losing their unbeaten record in World Cup Final matches. Uruguay then went on to be beaten for a second time as Austria secured third place.

=== Final: "The Miracle of Bern" ===
At the Wankdorf Stadion in Berne, 60,000 people watched the final between West Germany and Hungary, a rematch of a first-round game, which Hungary had won 8–3 against the reserves of the German team. The Golden Team of the Hungarians were favourites, as they were unbeaten for a record of 32 consecutive matches, but they had had two tough knockout matches. It started raining on match day–in Germany this was dubbed Fritz-Walter-Wetter ("Fritz Walter's weather") because the West German team captain Fritz Walter was said to play his best in the rain, a result of having contracted malaria during the war. Adi Dassler of Adidas provided the West German team with a new kind of shoes, with exchangeable studs that were replaced during halftime.

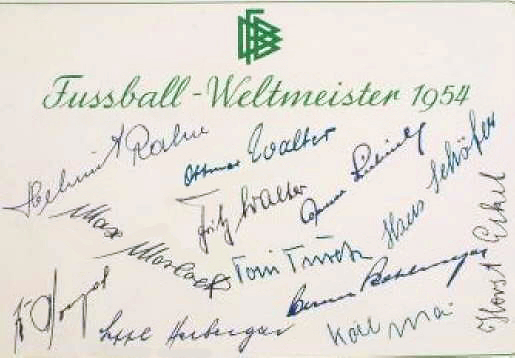
Card autographed by coach Sepp Herberger and the 11 German players that appeared in the final

Hungary's Ferenc Puskás played again in the final, even though he was not fully fit. Despite this he put his team ahead after only six minutes and with Zoltán Czibor adding another two minutes later it seemed that the pre-tournament favourites would take the title. However, with a quick goal from Max Morlock in the 10th minute and an equaliser by Helmut Rahn in the 19th, the tide began to turn.

The second half featured telling misses by the Hungarian team. Barely six minutes before the end of the match, the popular German radio reporter Herbert Zimmermann delivered the most famous line in the German commentary, recommending that "Rahn should shoot from deep", which he did. The second goal from Rahn gave West Germany a 3–2 lead while the Hungarian reporter György Szepesi burst into tears. Later, Zimmermann called Puskás offside before he kicked the ball into Toni Turek's net with 2 minutes left. While referee William Ling pointed to the centre spot, linesman Griffiths signalled offside. After a one-minute consultation, Ling disallowed the claimed equaliser.

The West Germans were handed the Jules Rimet Trophy as World Cup winners, while the crowd sang along to the tune of the national anthem of Germany – there was disquiet in the stadium as the Germans fans decided to sing the anthem's first stanza Deutschland über alles, instead of the uncontroversial third Unity and Justice and Freedom which was supposed to be sung at official events according to a 1952 decree. In Germany the success is known as the "Miracle of Bern" (Das Wunder Von Bern), and was memorialised in a 2003 film of the same name. For the Hungarians, the defeat was a disaster, and remains controversial for apparent refereeing errors and claims of doping.

One controversy concerns the 2–2 equaliser. Hungarian goalie Gyula Grosics jumped to catch Fritz Walter's corner shot, but Hans Schäfer obstructed him (in plain sight of TV cameras), allowing the ball to reach Rahn, who then scored. Another controversy concerns allegations of doping. Though teammates steadfastly denied this rumour, German historian Guido Knopp claimed in a 2004 documentary for German public channel ZDF that the players were injected with shots of vitamin C at half-time, using a needle earlier taken from a Soviet sports doctor. This resulted in both the better condition of the West German team in the second half and the wave of jaundice among their players following the tournament. A Leipzig University study in 2010 posited that the West German players had been injected with the banned substance methamphetamine.

Most controversial was the offside ruling for Puskás's intended 87th-minute equaliser. The camera filming the official footage was in a bad position to judge the situation, but eyewitnesses claimed that the referee was wrong, including West German substitute player Alfred Pfaff. In 2004, North German regional public channel NDR aired unofficial footage appearing to show that Puskás was onside.

== Venues ==
The tournament was played in six venues across six host cities. St. Jakob Stadium in Basel was used the most, staging nearly a quarter of all matches. Elsewhere, Bern, Lausanne, and Zurich each hosted five fixtures, with four games also in Geneva and one in Lugano.

=== Host cities and stadiums ===
Locations of the 1954 FIFA World Cup host cities

List of host cities and stadiums
City	Stadium	Capacity	Image
Basel	St. Jakob Stadium	54,800	
Bern	Wankdorfstadion	64,600	
Geneva	Stade des Charmilles	35,997	
Lausanne	Stade Olympique de la Pontaise	50,300	
Lugano	Stadio di Cornaredo	35,800	
Zurich	Hardturm Stadium	34,800	

== Squads ==
The 16 finalists named squads of 22 for the finals, though South Korea only named 20 players in their squad. Unlike recent tournaments, there were no requirements for teams to name three goalkeepers; most teams did, but 6 did not. Some teams also chose to leave some of their named squad at home, only bringing them to Switzerland if necessary.

== Match officials ==
- (Switzerland) Raymon Wyssling
- (Wales) Benjamin Griffiths
- (Scotland) Charlie Faultless
- (Spain) Manuel Asensi
- (Portugal) José Vieira da Costa
- (France) Raymond Vincenti
- (England) William Ling
- (Uruguay) Esteban Marino
- (England) Arthur Ellis
- (Belgium) Laurent Franken
- (Italy) Vincenzo Orlandini
- (Socialist Federal Republic of Yugoslavia) Vasa Stefanović
- (Brazil) Mário Vianna
- (West Germany) Emil Schmetzer
- (Austria) Carl Erich Steiner
- (Hungary) István Zsolt

== Group stage ==
All times listed are local time (CET, UTC+1).

=== Group 1 ===
Pos	Team	Pld	W	D	L	GF	GA	GD	Pts	Qualification
1	Brazil	2	1	1	0	6	1	+5	3	Advance to the knockout stage
1	Yugoslavia	2	1	1	0	2	1	+1	3	Advance to the knockout stage
3	France	2	1	0	1	3	3	0	2	
4	Mexico	2	0	0	2	2	8	−6	0	

Source: FIFA
16 June 1954
18:00

Brazil	5–0	Mexico
Baltazar 23'; Didi 30'; Pinga 34', 43'; Julinho 69'

Stade des Charmilles, Geneva
Attendance: 13,470
Referee: Raymon Wyssling (Switzerland)
16 June 1954
18:00

Yugoslavia	1–0	France
Milutinović 15'

Stade Olympique de la Pontaise, Lausanne
Attendance: 16,000
Referee: Benjamin Griffiths (Wales)

19 June 1954
17:00

Brazil	1–1 (a.e.t.)	Yugoslavia
Didi 69'		Zebec 48'

Stade Olympique de la Pontaise, Lausanne
Attendance: 24,637
Referee: Charlie Faultless (Scotland)
19 June 1954
17:10

France	3–2	Mexico
Vincent 19'; Cárdenas 46' (o.g.); Kopa 88' (pen.)		Lamadrid 54'; Balcázar 85'

Stade des Charmilles, Geneva
Attendance: 19,000
Referee: Manuel Asensi (Spain)

=== Group 2 ===
Pos	Team	Pld	W	D	L	GF	GA	GD	Pts	Qualification
1	Hungary	2	2	0	0	17	3	+14	4	Advance to the knockout stage
2	West Germany	2	1	0	1	7	9	−2	2 (Note: Second place decided over through play-off: West Germany 7–2 Turkey.)	Advance to the knockout stage
3	Turkey	2	1	0	1	8	4	+4	2	
4	South Korea	2	0	0	2	0	16	−16	0	

Source: FIFA
Notes:
17 June 1954
18:00

West Germany	4–1	Turkey
Schäfer 14'; Klodt 52'; O. Walter 60'; Morlock 84'		Mamat 2'

Wankdorfstadion, Bern
Attendance: 28,000
Referee: Jose da Costa Vieira (Portugal)
17 June 1954
18:00

Hungary	9–0	South Korea
Puskás 12', 89'; Lantos 18'; Kocsis 24', 36', 50'; Czibor 59'; Palotás 75', 83'

Hardturm Stadium, Zurich
Attendance: 13,000
Referee: Raymond Vincenti (France)

20 June 1954
16:50

Hungary	8–3	West Germany
Kocsis 3', 21', 69', 78'; Puskás 17'; Hidegkuti 52', 54'; J. Tóth 75'		Pfaff 25'; Rahn 77'; Herrmann 84'

St. Jakob Stadium, Basel
Attendance: 56,000
Referee: William Ling (England)
20 June 1954
17:00

Turkey	7–0	South Korea
Mamat 10', 30'; Lefter 24'; Sargun 37', 64', 70'; Keskin 76'

Stade des Charmilles, Geneva
Attendance: 4,000
Referee: Esteban Marino (Uruguay)

==== Play-off ====
23 June 1954
18:00

West Germany	7–2	Turkey
O. Walter 7'; Schäfer 12', 79'; Morlock 30', 60', 77'; F. Walter 62'		Ertan 21'; Lefter 82'

Hardturm Stadium, Zurich
Attendance: 17,000
Referee: Raymond Vincenti (France)

=== Group 3 ===
Pos	Team	Pld	W	D	L	GF	GA	GD	Pts	Qualification
1	Uruguay	2	2	0	0	9	0	+9	4	Advance to the knockout stage
1	Austria	2	2	0	0	6	0	+6	4	Advance to the knockout stage
3	Czechoslovakia	2	0	0	2	0	7	−7	0	
3	Scotland	2	0	0	2	0	8	−8	0	

Source: FIFA
16 June 1954
18:00

Uruguay	2–0	Czechoslovakia
Míguez 71'; Schiaffino 84'

Wankdorfstadion, Bern
Attendance: 20,500
Referee: Arthur Ellis (England)
16 June 1954
18:00

Austria	1–0	Scotland
Probst 33'

Hardturm Stadium, Zurich
Attendance: 25,000
Referee: Laurent Franken (Belgium)

19 June 1954
16:50

Uruguay	7–0	Scotland
Borges 17', 47', 57'; Míguez 30', 83'; Abbadie 54', 85'

St. Jakob Stadium, Basel
Attendance: 34,000
Referee: Vincenzo Orlandini (Italy)
19 June 1954
17:00

Austria	5–0	Czechoslovakia
Stojaspal 3', 65'; Probst 4', 21', 24'

Hardturm Stadium, Zurich
Attendance: 26,000
Referee: Vasa Stefanovic (Yugoslavia)

=== Group 4 ===
Pos	Team	Pld	W	D	L	GF	GA	GD	Pts	Qualification
1	England	2	1	1	0	6	4	+2	3	Advance to the knockout stage
2	Switzerland	2	1	0	1	2	3	−1	2 (Note: Second place decided over through play-off: Switzerland 4–1 Italy)	Advance to the knockout stage
3	Italy	2	1	0	1	5	3	+2	2	
4	Belgium	2	0	1	1	5	8	−3	1	

Source: FIFA
Notes:
17 June 1954
17:50

Switzerland	2–1	Italy
Ballaman 18'; Hügi 78'		Boniperti 44'

Stade Olympique de la Pontaise, Lausanne
Attendance: 43,000
Referee: Mário Vianna (Brazil)
17 June 1954
18:10

England	4–4 (a.e.t.)	Belgium
Broadis 26', 63'; Lofthouse 36', 91'		Anoul 5', 71'; Coppens 67'; Dickinson 94' (o.g.)

St. Jakob Stadium, Basel
Attendance: 14,000
Referee: Emil Schmetzer (West Germany)

20 June 1954
17:00

Italy	4–1	Belgium
Pandolfini 41' (pen.); Galli 48'; Frignani 58'; Lorenzi 78'		Anoul 81'

Stadio di Cornaredo, Lugano
Attendance: 24,000
Referee: Carl Erich Steiner (Austria)
20 June 1954
17:10

England	2–0	Switzerland
Mullen 43'; Wilshaw 69'

Wankdorfstadion, Bern
Attendance: 43,500
Referee: Istvan Zsolt (Hungary)

==== Play-off ====
23 June 1954
18:00

Switzerland	4–1	Italy
Hügi 14', 85'; Ballaman 48'; Fatton 90'		Nesti 67'

St. Jakob Stadium, Basel
Attendance: 30,000
Referee: Benjamin Griffiths (Wales)

== Knockout stage ==
=== Bracket ===
Quarter-finals
27 June – Geneva
West Germany	2
Yugoslavia	0
26 June – Lausanne
Austria	7
Switzerland	5
27 June – Bern
Hungary	4
Brazil	2
26 June – Basel
Uruguay	4
England	2

Semi-finals
30 June – Basel
West Germany	6
Austria	1
30 June – Lausanne
Hungary (a.e.t.)	4
Uruguay	2

Final
4 July – Bern
West Germany	3
Hungary	2
Match for third place
3 July – Zurich
Austria	3
Uruguay	1

=== Quarter-finals ===
26 June 1954
17:00 CET

Austria	7–5	Switzerland
Wagner 25', 27', 53'; A. Körner 26', 34'; Ocwirk 32'; Probst 76'		Ballaman 16', 39'; Hügi 17', 19', 60'

Stade Olympique de la Pontaise, Lausanne
Attendance: 35,000
Referee: Charlie Faultless (Scotland)

26 June 1954
17:00 CET

Uruguay	4–2	England
Borges 5'; Varela 39'; Schiaffino 46'; Ambrois 78'		Lofthouse 16'; Finney 67'

St. Jakob Stadium, Basel
Attendance: 28,000
Referee: Carl Erich Steiner (Austria)

27 June 1954
17:00 CET

West Germany	2–0	Yugoslavia
Horvat 9' (o.g.); Rahn 85'

Stade des Charmilles, Geneva
Attendance: 17,000
Referee: Istvan Zsolt (Hungary)

27 June 1954
17:00 CET

Hungary	4–2	Brazil
Hidegkuti 4'; Kocsis 7', 88'; Lantos 60' (pen.)		Djalma Santos 18' (pen.); Julinho 65'

Wankdorf Stadium, Bern
Attendance: 40,000
Referee: Arthur Ellis (England)

=== Semi-finals ===
30 June 1954
18:00 CET

West Germany	6–1	Austria
Schäfer 31'; Morlock 47'; F. Walter 54' (pen.), 64' (pen.); O. Walter 61', 89'		Probst 51'

St. Jakob Stadium, Basel
Attendance: 58,000
Referee: Vincenzo Orlandini (Italy)

30 June 1954
18:00 (CET)

Hungary	4–2 (a.e.t.)	Uruguay
Czibor 13'; Hidegkuti 46'; Kocsis 111', 116'		Hohberg 75', 86'

Stade Olympique de la Pontaise, Lausanne
Attendance: 45,000
Referee: Benjamin Griffiths (Wales)

=== Match for third place ===
3 July 1954
17:00 (CET)

Austria	3–1	Uruguay
Stojaspal 16' (pen.); Cruz 59' (o.g.); Ocwirk 89'		Hohberg 22'

Hardturm Stadium, Zurich
Attendance: 32,000
Referee: Raymon Wyssling (Switzerland)

=== Final ===
4 July 1954
17:00 CET

West Germany	3–2	Hungary
Morlock 10'; Rahn 18', 84'		Puskás 6'; Czibor 8'

Wankdorfstadion, Bern
Attendance: 62,500
Referee: William Ling (England)

== Statistics ==
=== Goalscorers ===
With 11 goals, Sándor Kocsis was the top scorer in the tournament. In total, 140 goals were scored by 63 players, with four of them credited as own goals.

11 goals

- (Hungary) Sándor Kocsis

6 goals

- (Austria) Erich Probst
- (Switzerland) Josef Hügi
- (West Germany) Max Morlock

4 goals

- (Hungary) Nándor Hidegkuti
- (Hungary) Ferenc Puskás
- (Switzerland) Robert Ballaman
- (Uruguay) Carlos Borges
- (West Germany) Helmut Rahn
- (West Germany) Hans Schäfer
- (West Germany) Ottmar Walter

3 goals

- (Austria) Ernst Stojaspal
- (Austria) Theodor Wagner
- (Belgium) Léopold Anoul
- (England) Nat Lofthouse
- (Hungary) Zoltán Czibor
- (Turkey) Burhan Sargun
- (Turkey) Suat Mamat
- (Uruguay) Juan Hohberg
- (Uruguay) Óscar Míguez
- (West Germany) Fritz Walter

2 goals

- (Austria) Alfred Körner
- (Austria) Ernst Ocwirk
- (Brazil) Didi
- (Brazil) Julinho
- (Brazil) Pinga
- (England) Ivor Broadis
- (Hungary) Mihály Lantos
- (Hungary) Péter Palotás
- (Turkey) Lefter Küçükandonyadis
- (Uruguay) Julio Abbadie
- (Uruguay) Juan Alberto Schiaffino

1 goal

- (Belgium) Henri Coppens
- (Brazil) Baltazar
- (Brazil) Djalma Santos
- (England) Tom Finney
- (England) Jimmy Mullen
- (England) Dennis Wilshaw
- (France) Raymond Kopa
- (France) Jean Vincent
- (Hungary) József Tóth
- (Italy) Giampiero Boniperti
- (Italy) Amleto Frignani
- (Italy) Carlo Galli
- (Italy) Benito Lorenzi
- (Italy) Fulvio Nesti
- (Italy) Egisto Pandolfini
- (Mexico) Tomás Balcázar
- (Mexico) José Luis Lamadrid
- (Switzerland) Jacques Fatton
- (Turkey) Mustafa Ertan
- (Turkey) Erol Keskin
- (Uruguay) Javier Ambrois
- (Uruguay) Obdulio Varela
- (West Germany) Richard Herrmann
- (West Germany) Bernhard Klodt
- (West Germany) Alfred Pfaff
- (Socialist Federal Republic of Yugoslavia) Miloš Milutinović
- (Socialist Federal Republic of Yugoslavia) Branko Zebec

1 own goal

- (England) Jimmy Dickinson (playing against Belgium)
- (Mexico) Raúl Cárdenas (playing against France)
- (Uruguay) Luis Cruz (playing against Austria)
- (Socialist Federal Republic of Yugoslavia) Ivica Horvat (playing against West Germany)

=== Team of the Tournament ===
FIFA selected the following players for the 1954 FIFA World Cup All-Star Team.

Goalkeeper	Defenders	Midfielders	Forwards
(Hungary) Gyula Grosics	(Brazil) Djalma Santos (Austria) Ernst Ocwirk (Uruguay) José Santamaría	(Hungary) József Bozsik (Hungary) Zoltán Czibor (Hungary) Nándor Hidegkuti (Germany) Fritz Walter	(Hungary) Sándor Kocsis (Hungary) Ferenc Puskás (Germany) Helmut Rahn

=== Tournament ranking ===
In 1986, FIFA published a report that ranked all teams in each World Cup up to and including 1986, based on progress in the competition and overall results (not counting play-off results). The rankings for the 1954 tournament were as follows:

Per statistical convention in football, matches decided in extra time are counted as wins and losses. Per FIFA's ranking, the results of play-offs are not considered in the tournament ranking.

Pos	Grp	Team	Pld	W	D	L	GF	GA	GD	Pts	Final result
1	2	West Germany	5	4	0	1	18	12	+6	8 (Note: West Germany's record including the play-off: 6 pld, 5 won, 0 drawn, 1 lost, 25 GF, 14 GA, +11 GD, 10 pts.)	Champions
2	2	Hungary	5	4	0	1	27	10	+17	8	Runners-up
3	3	Austria	5	4	0	1	17	12	+5	8	Third place
4	3	Uruguay	5	3	0	2	16	9	+7	6	Fourth place
5	1	Brazil	3	1	1	1	8	5	+3	3	Eliminated in quarter-finals
6	4	England	3	1	1	1	8	8	0	3	Eliminated in quarter-finals
7	1	Yugoslavia	3	1	1	1	2	3	−1	3	Eliminated in quarter-finals
8	4	Switzerland (H)	3	1	0	2	7	10	−3	2 (Note: Switzerland's record including the play-off: 4 pld, 2 won, 0 drawn, 2 lost, 11 GF, 11 GA, 0 GD, 4 pts.)	Eliminated in quarter-finals
9	2	Turkey	2	1	0	1	8	4	+4	2 (Note: Turkey's record including the play-off: 3 pld, 1 won, 0 drawn, 2 lost, 10 GF, 11 GA, −1 GD, 2 pts.)	Eliminated in group stage
10	4	Italy	2	1	0	1	5	3	+2	2 (Note: Italy's record including the play-off: 3 pld, 1 won, 0 drawn, 2 lost, 6 GF, 7 GA, −1 GD, 2 pts.)	Eliminated in group stage
11	1	France	2	1	0	1	3	3	0	2	Eliminated in group stage
12	4	Belgium	2	0	1	1	5	8	−3	1	Eliminated in group stage
13	1	Mexico	2	0	0	2	2	8	−6	0	Eliminated in group stage
14	3	Czechoslovakia	2	0	0	2	0	7	−7	0	Eliminated in group stage
15	3	Scotland	2	0	0	2	0	8	−8	0	Eliminated in group stage
16	2	South Korea	2	0	0	2	0	16	−16	0	Eliminated in group stage

Source: FIFA
(H) Hosts

== In film ==
The final scene of Rainer Werner Fassbinder's 1979 film The Marriage of Maria Braun takes place during the finals of the 1954 World Cup; in the scene's background, the sports announcer is celebrating West Germany's victory and shouting "Deutschland ist wieder was!" (Germany is something again); the film uses this as the symbol of Germany's recovery from the ravages of the Second World War.

Sönke Wortmann's 2003 German box-office hit The Miracle of Bern (in German: Das Wunder von Bern) re-tells the story of the German team's route to victory through the eyes of a young boy who admires the key player of the final, Helmut Rahn.
