= Péter Palotás =

Hungarian footballer

Personal information
- Full name: Péter Poteleczky
- Date of birth: 27 June 1929
- Place of birth: Budapest, Hungary
- Date of death: 17 May 1967 (aged 37)
- Place of death: Budapest, Hungary
- Height: 1.76 m (5 ft 9 1/2 in)
- Position: Forward

Youth career
- MTK Budapest FC

Senior career*
Years	Team	Apps	(Gls)
1950–1959	MTK Budapest FC	231	(156)

International career
1950–1956	Hungary	24	(18)
Medal record
Representing Hungary
Olympic Games
Gold medal – first place	1952 Helsinki
FIFA World Cup
Runner-up	1954 Switzerland
- * Club domestic league appearances and goals

Péter Palotás (27 June 1929 – 17 May 1967), born as Péter Poteleczky, was a Hungarian footballer who played as a forward for MTK Budapest FC and Hungary. During the 1950s he was a fringe member of the team known as the Mighty Magyars and played alongside the likes of Ferenc Puskás, Zoltán Czibor, Sándor Kocsis, Nándor Hidegkuti and József Bozsik. Palotás was an early pioneer of the deep-lying centre-forward role and in 1955 he scored the first ever hat-trick in a European Cup game. In 1959 he retired as a player due to a heart condition. The same condition led to his death on 17 May 1967.

== Club career ==
Palotás spent all his playing career at MTK Budapest FC. However, during this time, the club changed their name several times. In 1949, when Hungary became a communist state, MTK were taken over by the secret police, the ÁVH and subsequently the club became known as Textiles SE. They then became Bástya SE, then Vörös Lobogó SE and then finally back to MTK. Despite this turmoil, the 1950s proved a successful era for club and it was while at MTK that Palotás, together with Nándor Hidegkuti and coach Márton Bukovi, pioneered the deep-lying centre-forward position. With a team that also included Mihály Lantos and József Zakariás, MTK and Palotás won three Hungarian League titles, a Hungarian Cup and a Mitropa Cup. In 1955, as Vörös Lobogó SE, they also played in the first ever European Cup. On 7 September 1955 at the Népstadion, Palotás scored a hat-trick as they beat RSC Anderlecht 6–3 in the first leg of the first round. This was the first ever hat-trick scored in a European Cup game. He scored again in the second-leg as Vörös Lobogó SE won 4–1. During the quarter-finals against Stade Reims he scored a further two goals as they lost 8–6 on aggregate and he finished the competition with a total of six goals scored.

== International career ==
Between 1950 and 1956, Palotás won 24 caps and scored 18 goals for Hungary. He scored twice on his debut on 24 September 1950 in a 12–0 win against Albania. In 1952 Palotás scored four goals as he helped Hungary become Olympic Champions. This included two in a 3–0 win against Italy on 21 July. He also played in the final against Yugoslavia on 2 August 1952. On 17 May 1953, he helped Hungary clinch the Central European International Cup when he played in a 3–0 win against Italy at the Stadio Olimpico.

Although teammates at MTK, Palotás and Nándor Hidegkuti were rivals for a place in the national side. By 1953 Hidegkuti had established himself as the first-choice deep-lying centre-forward for Hungary and as a result Palotás missed out on the two prestige friendlies against England. He travelled to England for the first game but remained on the bench. Despite this setback he continued to play regularly for Hungary until 1956. During the 1954 FIFA World Cup he scored twice in the group stage 9–0 win against South Korea and also played in the semi-final against Uruguay. On 19 May 1955 he scored a hat-trick against Finland before playing his last game for Hungary on 9 June 1956 against Portugal.

== Honours ==
=== Club ===
MTK Budapest FC

- Hungarian League: 1951, 1953, 1958
- Hungarian Cup: 1952
- Mitropa Cup: 1955

=== International ===
Hungary

- Olympic Champions: 1952
- Central European Champions: 1953
- World Cup Runner-up: 1954

=== Individual ===
- Hungarian Football Federation Player of the Year: 1951

== Sources ==
- Behind The Curtain - Travels in Eastern European Football: Jonathan Wilson (2006)
