= József Zakariás =

Hungarian footballer and manager (1924–1971)

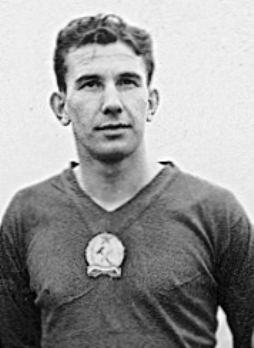
- Zakariás in 1953

Personal information
- Full name: József Zakariás
- Date of birth: 25 March 1924
- Place of birth: Budafok, Hungary
- Date of death: 22 November 1971 (aged 47)
- Place of death: Budapest, Hungary
- Height: 1.72 m (5 ft 7 1/2 in)
- Position: Defensive midfielder

Youth career
- 1936–1941: Budafoki MTE

Senior career*
Years	Team	Apps	(Gls)
1941–1944	Kábelgyár SC	341	(22)
1944	Gamma FC		
1945	Budai Barátság SE		
1946	Budai MSE		
1946–1950	MATEOSZ Munkás SE	432	(19)
1950	Teherfuvar SE		
1950	Budapest Előre		
1951–1953	Bástya SE		
1953–1956	Vörös Lobogó SE		
1957–1958	Egyertértés SE		

International career
1947–1954	Hungary	35	(0)

Managerial career
- 1959–1960: Szigetszentmiklósi SE
- 1961–1968: Guinea
- 1968–1971: Medosz Erdért SE
Medal record
Representing Hungary
Olympic Games
Gold medal – first place	1952 Helsinki
FIFA World Cup
Runner-up	1954 Switzerland
- * Club domestic league appearances and goals

József Zakariás (25 March 1924 – 22 November 1971) was a Hungarian footballer and manager. During the 1950s, he was a member of the legendary Hungary team known as the Mighty Magyars. Other members of the team included Nándor Hidegkuti, Ferenc Puskás, Zoltán Czibor, Sándor Kocsis and József Bozsik.

== MTK Hungária FC ==
Zakariás was born and died in Budapest and spent the peak of his career at MTK Hungária FC. However while he was with the club they were known as Bástya SE and then Vörös Lobogó SE. Under coach Márton Bukovi and with a team that also included Nándor Hidegkuti, Péter Palotás and Mihály Lantos, Zakariás helped MTK win two Nemzeti Bajnokság I titles, a Magyar Kupa and a Mitropa Cup.

== Hungarian International ==
Between 1947 and 1954, Zakariás won 35 caps for Hungary. As one of the legendary Mighty Magyars, he helped Hungary become Olympic Champions in 1952, Central European Champions in 1953 and defeated England twice. He then helped Hungary reach the 1954 World Cup final. During the World Cup finals he played in four of the five games Hungary played in. He allegedly broke a curfew before the final, spending the previous night with a hotel maid. Zakariás never played for Hungary again.

== Honours ==
Hungary

- Olympic Champions
  - 1952
- Central European Champions
  - 1953
- World Cup
  - Runner-up: 1954

MTK/Bástya/Vörös Lobogó

- Hungarian Champions: 2
  - 1953, 1958
- Magyar Kupa: 1
  - 1952
- Mitropa Cup: 1
  - 1955

== Sources ==
- Behind The Curtain – Travels in Eastern European Football: Jonathan Wilson (2006)
