= Sepp Herberger =

German football player and manager (1897–1977)

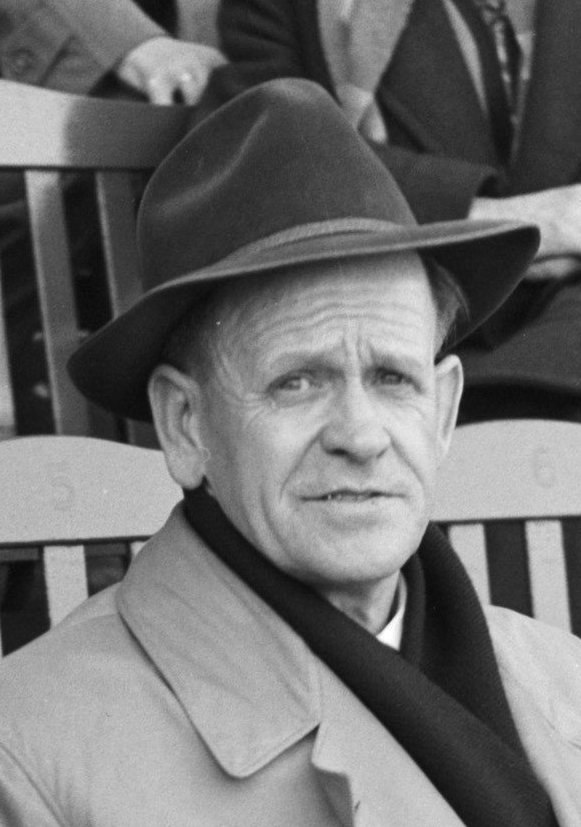
- Herberger in 1957

Personal information
- Full name: Josef Herberger
- Date of birth: 28 March 1897
- Place of birth: Mannheim, German Empire
- Date of death: 28 April 1977 (aged 80)
- Place of death: Mannheim, West Germany
- Position: Striker

Senior career*
Years	Team	Apps	(Gls)
1914–1921	Waldhof Mannheim	127	(101)
1922–1926	VfR Mannheim	66	(55)
1926–1930	Tennis Borussia Berlin	43	(30)
Total		236	(186)

International career
1921–1925	Germany	3	(2)

Managerial career
- 1928–1929: SV Nowawes 03
- 1930–1932: Tennis Borussia Berlin
- 1932–1933: Western Germany
- 1932–1936: Germany (assistant coach)
- 1936–1942: Germany
- 1945–1946: Eintracht Frankfurt (interim)
- 1950–1964: West Germany
Medal record
Men's football
Representing West Germany (as manager)
FIFA World Cup
Winner	1954 Switzerland
Signature
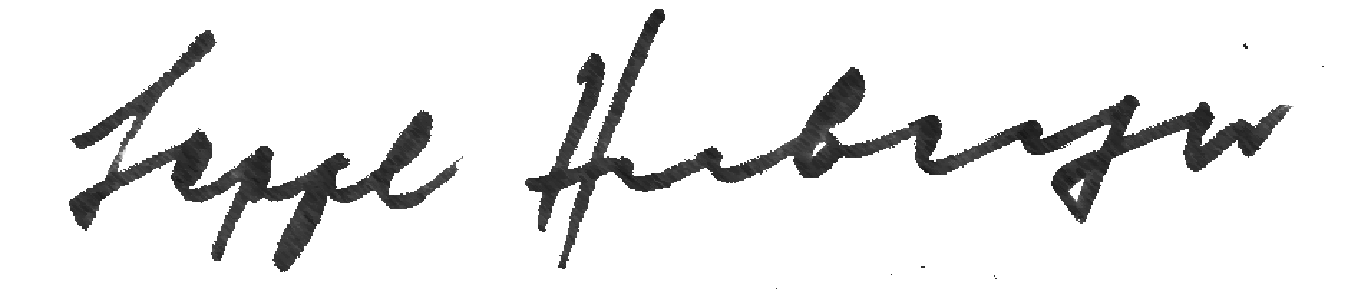
- * Club domestic league appearances and goals

Josef "Sepp" Herberger (28 March 1897 – 28 April 1977) was a German football player and manager. He is most famous for being the manager of the West Germany national team that won the 1954 FIFA World Cup final, a match later dubbed The Miracle of Bern, defeating the overwhelming favourites from Hungary. Previously he had also coached the Breslau Eleven, one of the greatest teams in German football history.

== Early life and career ==
Born in Mannheim, Herberger grew up in a poor, Catholic family of farmers, which moved to Mannheim in order to work in the local Saint-Gobain glass factory.

He later played three times for the German football team between 1921 and 1925 before becoming assistant to Otto Nerz in 1932. Herberger succeeded him as national coach after Germany's uninspired loss to Norway in quarter finals at the 1936 Olympics. After the war, he had a short spell as interim coach with Eintracht Frankfurt, before being recalled as national team coach in 1950. He remained the position until 1964, when he was succeeded by Helmut Schön. He died of pneumonia in Weinheim-Hohensachsen (de), aged 80.

== 1954 World Cup win, "The Miracle of Bern" ==
Hungary was the overwhelming favourite to win the 1954 World Cup. Its legendary Golden Team, also known as the Mighty Magyars, had not lost a match in four years. They were the reigning Olympic Champion and had won the Central European International Cup in 1953. Once the World Cup started, Hungary had been dominant, outscoring their opponents 17–3 in their two group games while West Germany had been outscored 9–7. In their match against each other, Hungary had won 8–3. The final was played in heavy rain. Hungary scored an early goal and minutes later doubled their lead. Germany pulled one back within two minutes, and equalized eight minutes after that. Hungary had more chances the rest of the way, but was unable to score. West Germany scored with six minutes left in the match to win 3–2. Among Herberger's moves credited with helping the team in the final are: fielding a below strength and largely out-of-position team in the first match against Hungary, to disguise the team's strengths; giving Fritz Walter defensive help, so he could concentrate his energies on attacking; and instructing his team to attack the Hungarian penalty area from the wings, instead of down the middle.

== References in popular culture ==
Three of Herberger's popular sayings are quoted in the beginning of the 1998 film Run Lola Run. The first is at the very beginning of the film (Nach dem Spiel ist vor dem Spiel, "After the game is before the game"). The second quote is "Der Ball ist rund und das Spiel dauert 90 Minuten"," says a character later introduced as a security guard at the bank in which Lola visits her father. Both of which is a commonly used amalgamation of two separate famous quotes.

The 2003 film, The Miracle of Bern, following Herberger and his team's path to victory in the 1954 World Cup, also features a number of these quotations including the amalgamation of two of the above, "The ball is round and the game lasts for 90 minutes" (Der Ball ist rund und das Spiel dauert 90 Minuten).

== Controversy ==
Herberger joined the Nazi Party in 1933. His nomination to the Germany's Sports Hall of Fame in 2008 caused some criticism because of his Nazi past.

== Coaching record ==
Team	From	To	Record					
Team	From	To	G	W	D	L	Win %	Ref.
Germany	1936	1942	70	42	13	15	60.00	
West Germany	1950	1964	97	52	14	31	53.61	
total record			167	94	27	46	56.29	

== Honours ==
=== As a player ===
VfR Mannheim

- South German Championship: 1925

=== As a manager ===
West Germany

- FIFA World Cup: 1954

=== Individual ===
- World Soccer 20th Greatest Manager of All Time: 2013

== Filmography ==
- The Big Game (1942)

== See also ==
- National team managers with 100 or more matches
