= Vincenzo Orlandini =

Italian football referee

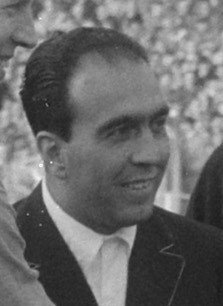
Orlandini in 1952

Vincenzo Orlandini (30 August 1910 – 23 October 1961) was the first Italian to officiate in a FIFA World Cup final match when he ran the line to William Ling in the 1954 World Cup final between Hungary and West Germany.

Orlandini had already taken charge of both the quarter-final between Uruguay and England as well as the semi-final between West Germany and Austria when he was selected to run the line in that tournament's final.

Orlandini came very much to prominence as an international referee during the mid-1950s; officiating in the December 1954 meeting between World Champions West Germany and England in London as well as the May 1955 meeting between Yugoslavia and Scotland in Belgrade. He would appear, later, in the 1958 FIFA World Cup finals, officiating in each of the matches involving Scotland in Group A.

He also officiated in the first European Championship in one of the qualifying matches.
