= The Miracle of Bern =

- Directed by: Sönke Wortmann
- Written by: Sönke Wortmann; Rochus Hahn
- Produced by: Sönke Wortmann; Tom Spieß; Hanno Huth; Benjamin Herrmann
- Starring: Louis Klamroth; Peter Lohmeyer
- Distributed by: Bavaria Film International
- Release date: October 16, 2003 (Germany)
- Running time: 118 minutes
- Country: Germany
- Language: German
- Budget: ~ €7,000,000

The Miracle of Bern (German: Das Wunder von Bern) is a 2003 film by Sönke Wortmann, which tells the story of a German family (particularly of a young boy and his depressed ex-POW father) and the unexpected West German miracle victory in the 1954 World Cup Final in Bern, Switzerland.

The film can be regarded as a portrait of post-war Germany. With over 6 million cinema visitors, it is one of Germany's best-selling films. Among those attending the première were Chancellor Gerhard Schröder, Peer Steinbrück, Minister-President of North Rhine-Westphalia, and Otto Schily, Federal Minister of the Interior (a position whose holder is also informally known as Minister for Sports).

Since November 2014, Hamburg's new musical theatre Theater an der Elbe is home to a successful musical production of the same name.

== Plot ==
Richard, a coal miner from Essen, returns after eleven years of being a Soviet prisoner of war in Siberia. In the meantime, his wife, two sons, and one daughter have reached a minimum standard of living without him. When he is unexpectedly repatriated in 1954, he has severe problems in reintegrating himself with his family and country. His wife is running a small bar, his elder son has become a Communist challenging his father's ideals of the Nazi time, his daughter flirts with British soldiers who are his former enemies, while his 11-year-old son Matthias, who never knew his father, admires a local football hero instead, Helmut Rahn of Rot-Weiß Essen.

While Richard is initially very stern about Matthias' love for football, he gradually softens such that, on the night before the final game, father and son drive to Bern to see the match.

An additional plot of the movie is the personal triumph of Helmut Rahn, for whom Matthias becomes a lucky mascot. Rahn, nicknamed "The Boss", has a successful record at club level, though is rarely chosen to play at national level in trainer Sepp Herberger's team.

A third more light-hearted comic relief story line revolves around the fictional sports reporter Paul Ackermann and his wife, who travel to the World Cup despite their fundamentally different views on the importance of football.

There are several miraculous events in the film. For Richard, it is the sudden joy of scoring a goal with an abandoned football. For Rahn, it is seeing Matthias on the sideline that spurs him into scoring the winning goal. For Sepp Herberger, however, the miracles are more mundane: the sudden rain that slows down the Hungarians (however, German captain Fritz Walter tended to perform better in stormy conditions), but not so much the Germans fitted with Adolf Dassler's revolutionary screw-in football studs. For all Germans, it's the unexpected euphoria of a win that heals many wounds, becoming a symbol of the ongoing economic "miracle".

== Cast ==
=== Lubanski family ===
- Louis Klamroth - Matthias Lubanski
- Peter Lohmeyer - Richard Lubanski
- Johanna Gastdorf - Christa Lubanski
- Mirko Lang - Bruno Lubanski
- Birthe Wolter - Ingrid Lubanski

=== Football team ===
- Peter Franke - Sepp Herberger
- Sascha Göpel - Helmut Rahn
- Knut Hartwig - Fritz Walter
- Holger Dexne - Horst Eckel
- Simon Verhoeven - Ottmar Walter
- Jo Stock - Toni Turek
- Martin Bretschneider - Hans Schäfer

=== Others ===
- Katharina Wackernagel - Annette Ackermann
- Lucas Gregorowicz - Paul Ackermann

=== English dubbing ===
- Karen Joy Cifarelli

== The real sports miracle ==
The 1954 German team, captained by Fritz Walter and coached by Sepp Herberger, won the World Cup in a final against the Hungarian Mighty Magyars, undefeated for four years. Germany came back from an early two-goal deficit to win 3–2, with Helmut Rahn scoring the winning goal six minutes from the end of full-time.

== Awards ==
- Prix du Public UBS, Locarno International Film Festival 2003
- Goldene Leinwand
- Deutscher Filmpreis 2004 for Best Picture (Silver), German Film of the Year, German Actor of the Year (Peter Lohmeyer)
- Bavarian Film Award 2004 to Sönke Wortmann as Best Director and to Johanna Gastdorf as Best Supporting Actress

== See also ==
- List of association football films
