= Herbert Zimmermann (football commentator) =

German football commentator

- Born: 29 November 1917; Alsdorf, German Empire
- Died: 16 December 1966 (aged 49); Bassum, West Germany
- Occupation: football commentator
- Employer: Nordwestdeutscher Rundfunk
- Military career
- Allegiance: Nazi Germany
- Branch: Army
- Rank: Hauptmann (Captain)
- Units: 14th Panzer Division
- Conflicts: World War II
- Awards: Knight's Cross of the Iron Cross

Herbert Zimmermann (29 November 1917 – 16 December 1966) was a popular German football commentator.

He did one of the most famous pieces of commentary in German during the World Cup final in 1954 by "recommending" the goal that won "The Miracle of Bern" for West Germany.

Schäfer nach innen geflankt... Kopfball... Abgewehrt. Aus dem Hintergrund müßte Rahn schießen... Rahn schießt! Tor! Tor! Tor! Tor!
(silence)
Tor für Deutschland! Drei zu zwei führt Deutschland. Halten Sie mich für verrückt, halten Sie mich für übergeschnappt!

Schäfer puts in the cross... header... Cleared. Rahn should shoot from deep... Rahn shoots! Goal! Goal! Goal! Goal!
(Zimmermann fell silent for eight seconds before he spoke again)
Goal for Germany! Germany lead 3-2. Call me mad, call me crazy!"

At the end of the match, Zimmermann famously proclaimed, "It's over! Over! Over! Germany are the World Champions" - words which, as one historian has observed, are "as famous in Germany as Kenneth Wolstenholme's "They think it's all over" is in England" (the latter having been spoken in the final moments of England's victory against West Germany in the World Cup final of 1966). (Note: Paul Legg, 'It's Over! Over! Over', History Today, July 2014 at page 41. Legg added that "It's over!" appeared "not just to refer to the outcome of the match but also to the promise of an end to the hardship and humiliation Germans had experienced" since the end of the Second World War in 1945.) After the final Zimermann was criticized for praising the goal keeper Turek by calling him Toni du bist ein Teufelskerl, Toni du bist ein Fußballgott (Toni you are a devil chap. Toni you are a football god.). Zimmermann who had been a major during the war, was also criticized for the somewhat militaristic vocabulary he had used during the match.

Zimmermann also commented the world championships in 1958, 1962 and 1966 over the radio. However, TV was more prominent now as most people had access to TV sets, so fewer and fewer people heard his reports.

On 11 December 1966 Zimmermann, who was known as a notoriously bad driver, had an accident in his car and died from his injuries five days later.

Zimmermann was the uncle of the German Green Party politician Hans-Christian Ströbele. The family holds the rights to his reports which still generates revenue.

== Awards ==
- Wound Badge in Silver (1942)
- Iron Cross 2nd and 1st Class
- Knight's Cross of the Iron Cross on 5 April 1945 as Hauptmann and chief of the 1/Panzer-Regiment 36
