= Gyula Grosics =

Hungarian footballer and manager (1926–2014)

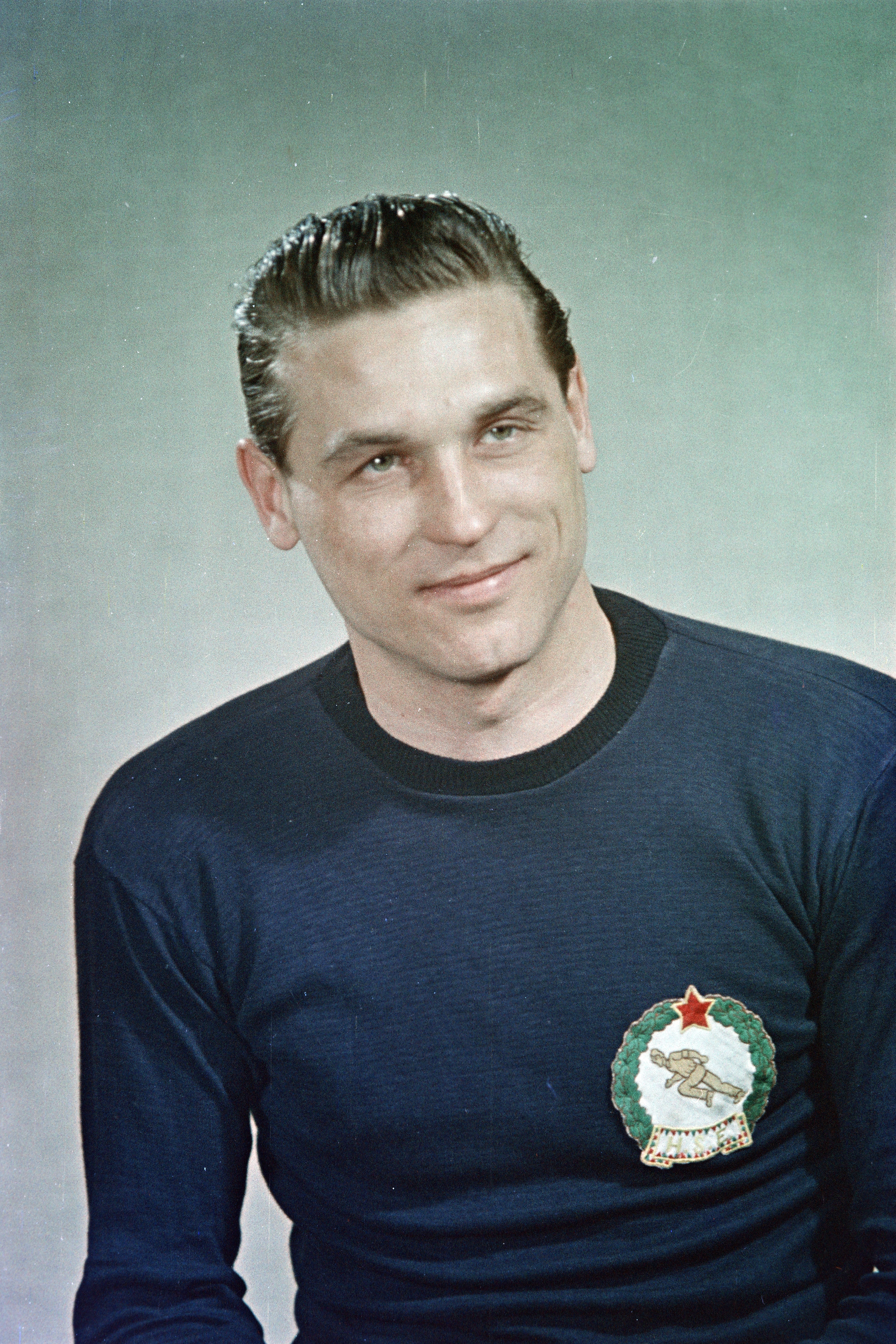
- Grosics in 1954

Personal information
- Date of birth: 4 February 1926
- Place of birth: Dorog, Hungary
- Date of death: 13 June 2014 (aged 88)
- Place of death: Budapest, Hungary
- Height: 1.78 m (5 ft 10 in)
- Position: Goalkeeper

Senior career*
| Years | Team | Apps | (Gls) |
| 1945–1947 | Dorogi Bányász | 61 | (0) |
| 1947–1949 | MATEOSZ Budapest | 55 | (0) |
| 1949–1950 | Teherfuvar | 30 | (0) |
| 1950–1956 | Budapest Honvéd FC | 125 | (0) |
| 1956–1962 | Tatabánya Bányász SC | 123 | (0) |
| Total | | 394 | (0) |

International career
| 1947–1962 | Hungary | 86 | (0) |

Managerial career
- 1963: Tatabánya Bányász SC
- 1964–1965: Salgótarjáni BTC
- 1966: KSI
- 1966–1968: Kuwait
Medal record
Representing Hungary
Olympic Games
| Gold medal – first place | 1952 Helsinki |
FIFA World Cup
| Runner-up | 1954 Switzerland |
- * Club domestic league appearances and goals

Gyula Grosics (Hungarian pronunciation: [ˈɟulɒ ˈɡroʃit͡ʃ]; 4 February 1926 – 13 June 2014) was a Hungarian football goalkeeper who played 86 times for the Hungary national football team and was part of the "Golden Team" of the 1950s. Regarded as one of the greatest goalkeepers of all time, he was thought to be the first goalkeeper to play as the sweeper-keeper. Grosics was nicknamed "Black Panther" (Hungarian: Fekete Párduc), because he wore black clothing while playing. He won a gold medal in football at the 1952 Summer Olympics.

== Early life ==
Gyula Grosics was born 4 February 1926 in Dorog, Hungary. Growing up, his mother encouraged him to be a priest, which later inspired his signature all-black match kits. Instead, Grosics began his professional football career in Dorog, playing for Dorogi Bányász in 1943. During World War II, he briefly fought for the Axis and was captured by American forces.

== Career ==
In 1947, Grosics made his debut with the Hungary national team. With the rather short Grosics in the goal, the team started an unbeaten streak in 1948 that would last until the 1954 FIFA World Cup. In 1949, he attempted to defect and was caught. He was charged with espionage and treason by the secret service and placed under house arrest. The charges were eventually dropped due to lack of evidence, but Grosics was banned from the national team for two years. However, after a year he returned to the national team. He also joined the Budapest Honvéd FC in 1950.

In 1952, Grosics led the team to Olympic gold. In 1953, Hungary beat England in a game dubbed "The Match of the Century". Hungary won 6–3, becoming the first team outside the British Isles to beat England at home. He was selected as the goalkeeper of the 1954 World Cup's All Star Team.

Hungary entered the 1954 FIFA World Cup on a four-year unbeaten streak and as heavy favorites. However, the team lost in the final 3–2 to West Germany, a team they defeated 8–3 in the group stage. Grosics was selected as the Team of the Tournament goalkeeper. By 1954, Hungary had recorded 42 victories with Grosics in goal, 7 draws, and just that one loss. During the 1956 Hungarian Revolution, Grosics and his family fled the country and attempted to start a new life. However, they were forced to return. Grosics then transferred to Tatabánya Bányász SC.

The national team went into decline, but made the 1958 and 1962 World Cups with Grosics in goal. When he was banned from transferring to Ferencvárosi TC after the 1962 season by the Communist Hungarian Sports Ministry, he retired. In total, Grosics played 86 games for the national team. He played in 390 Hungary first division games. In 2011, the Tatabánya football stadium was named after him.

== Style of play ==
Grosics is credited with developing the "sweeper-keeper" style of play, whereby the goalkeeper can act as an extra defender when needed. This also allowed his teammates to press deep in their opponents' half, plus Grosics' willingness to come out and challenge opposing attackers caused them to miss shots on net.

== Later life, and death ==
After retiring, Grosics went into coaching. During his career, he held positions with several Hungarian teams and the Kuwait national team. When Hungary became a democracy in 1990, Grosics unsuccessfully ran for parliament under the Hungarian Democratic Forum.

In 2008, Grosics was given the opportunity to play for Ferencvárosi TC, 46 years after being barred from signing with them. The 82-year-old Grosics performed the kick-off in a friendly match against Sheffield United. He was then substituted as the crowd gave a standing ovation.

Grosics died on 13 June 2014 after suffering from cardiac and lung problems. He was 88 years old.

== Honours ==
Budapest Honvéd

- Hungarian League: 1950, 1952, 1954, 1955

Hungary

- Balkan Cup Champions: 1947
- Olympic Champions: 1952
- Central European Champions: 1953
- World Cup runner-up: 1954

Individual

- Hungarian Football Federation Player of the Year: 1949, 1950
- FIFA World Cup: All-Star Team 1954
- World Soccer World XI: 1960, 1961
