= Solt (surname) =

Solt is a surname. Notable people with the surname include:

- Andrew Solt (born 1947), British-born American producer, director, and writer of documentary films
- Andrew P. Solt (1916–1990), Hungarian-born Hollywood screenwriter
- Jonquil Solt (1933-2022), supporter of paralympic equestrianism
- Julie Stevenson Solt (born 1958), judge on the Circuit Court for Frederick County in Maryland
- Mary Ellen Solt (1920–2007), American concrete poet, essayist, translator, editor, and professor
- Ron Solt (born 1962), American football guard

== See also ==
- Society of Our Lady of the Most Holy Trinity, Society of Apostolic Life within the Roman Catholic Church
- Society of London Theatre, British trade association for West End theatre in London
- Solt, town in Hungary
- Zsolt, Hungarian masculine given name
