= Zsolt =

Zsolt (Hungarian pronunciation: [ˈʒolt]) is a Hungarian masculine given name, originally a variant of Solt.

== Related names ==
- Zsolt: old Hungarian personal name, with an identical origin to the names Zoltán, Zsolt and possibly Csolt. Derived from the old Turkish word "sultan".

== Name-day ==
- April 10
- October 21
- November 20

== People with the given name ==
- Zoltán of Hungary, also known as Zsolt
- Zsolt Balázs (born 1988), Hungarian footballer
- Zsolt Bárányos (born 1975), Hungarian footballer
- Zsolt Baráth (born 1956), Hungarian politician
- Zsolt Baumgartner (born 1981), Hungarian racing driver
- Zsolt Bayer (born 1963), commentator for Magyar Hírlap
- Zsolt Bedák (born 1983), Hungarian boxer
- Zsolt Bodoni (born 1975), Hungarian painter
- Zsolt Borkai (born 1965), Hungarian gymnast and politician
- Zsolt Sándor Cseke (born 1988), Romanian dancer
- Zsolt Erdei (born 1974), Hungarian boxer
- Zsolt Gyulay (born 1964), Hungarian canoeist
- Zsolt Haraszti (born 1991), Hungarian footballer
- Zsolt Harsányi (1887–1943), Hungarian writer
- Zsolt Hegedűs (born 1969), Hungarian orthopedic surgeon and politician
- Zsolt Horváth, multiple people
- Zsolt Huszárik (born 1989), Hungarian footballer
- Zsolt Kalmár (born 1995), Hungarian footballer
- Zsolt Kerestely (1934–2026), Romanian composer and conductor
- Zsolt Kollár (born 1979), Hungarian footballer
- Zsolt Korcsmár (born 1989), Hungarian footballer
- Zsolt Kürtösi (born 1971), Hungarian athletics competitor
- Zsolt Laczkó (born 1986), Hungarian footballer
- Zsolt Makra (born 1982), Hungarian footballer
- Zsolt Nagy, multiple people
- Zsolt Nemcsik (born 1977), Hungarian sabre fencer
- Zsolt Németh, multiple people
- Zsolt Páling (born 1969), Hungarian footballer
- Zsolt Palotai (1961–2023), Hungarian electronic music DJ
- Zsolt Papp (born 1981), Hungarian politician
- Zsolt Szabó, multiple people
- Zsolt Szeglet (born 1977), Hungarian athletics competitor
- Zsolt Székely, Canadian lawyer and Notary Public
- Zsolt Szoboszlai (born 1974), Hungarian footballer
- Zsolt Tárkányi (born 1986), Hungarian politician

== People with the surname ==
- Béla Zsolt (1895–1949), Hungarian writer
- István Zsolt (1921–1991), Hungarian football referee
