= Hungary national football team =

Men's association football team

Hungary
- Nickname(s): Magyarok (Magyars); Nemzeti Tizenegy (National Eleven); Trikólor (Tricolours)
- Association: Magyar Labdarúgó Szövetség (MLSZ)
- Confederation: UEFA (Europe)
- Head coach: Marco Rossi
- Captain: Dominik Szoboszlai
- Most caps: Balázs Dzsudzsák (109)
- Top scorer: Ferenc Puskás (84)
- Home stadium: Puskás Aréna
- FIFA code: HUN
First colours	Second colours

FIFA ranking
- Current: 37 ▲1 (18 November 2026)
- Highest: 18 (April–May 2016)
- Lowest: 87 (July 1996)

First international
- Austria 5–0 Hungary (Vienna, Austria; 12 October 1902)

Biggest win
- Russia 0–12 Hungary (Moscow, Russia; 14 July 1912); Hungary 13–1 France (Budapest, Hungary; 12 June 1927); Hungary 12–0 Albania (Budapest, Hungary; 24 September 1950)

Biggest defeat
- Great Britain 7–0 Hungary (Stockholm, Sweden; 30 June 1912); Germany 7–0 Hungary (Cologne, Germany; 6 April 1941); Netherlands 8–1 Hungary (Amsterdam, Netherlands; 11 October 2013)

World Cup
- Appearances: 9 (first in 1934, last in 1986)
- Best result: Runners-up (1938, 1954)

European Championship
- Appearances: 5 (first in 1964)
- Best result: Third place (1964)

Olympic Games
- Appearances: 8 (first in 1912)
- Best result: Champions (1952, 1964, 1968)
Medal record
Men's football
FIFA World Cup
Silver medal – second place	1938 France	Team
Silver medal – second place	1954 Switzerland	Team
UEFA European Championship
Bronze medal – third place	1964 Spain	Team
Olympic Games
Gold medal – first place	1952 Finland	Team
Gold medal – first place	1964 Japan	Team
Gold medal – first place	1968 Mexico	Team
Silver medal – second place	1972 West Germany	Team
Bronze medal – third place	1960 Italy	Team
Central European International Cup
Gold medal – first place	1948–53	Team
Silver medal – second place	1955–60	Team
Bronze medal – third place	1931–32	Team
Bronze medal – third place	1933–35	Team
Balkan Cup
Gold medal – first place	1947	Team

The Hungary national football team (Hungarian: magyar labdarúgó-válogatott, pronounced [ˈmɒɟɒr ˈlɒbdɒruːɡoː ˈvaːloɡɒtotː]) represents Hungary in men's international football, and is controlled by the Hungarian Football Federation. The team has made nine appearances in the FIFA World Cup, and five in the UEFA European Championship. Hungary plays their home matches at the Puskás Aréna, in Budapest, which opened in November 2019.

Hungary has a significant history in international football, having won three Olympic gold medals, finished as runners-up in the 1938 and 1954 World Cup, and finished in third place in the 1964 European Championship. Hungary developed influential tactical approaches and achieved international success with the Golden Team, which included forward Ferenc Puskás, one of the leading goalscorers of the 20th century. The team influenced later tactical developments in football, including aspects of the style associated with Total Football. FIFA named the Puskás Award, given annually to the player who scored the "most beautiful" goal of the calendar year in honor of Puskás. The side of that era holds the second all-time highest Football Elo Ranking in the world, with 2233 in 1954, and one of the longest undefeated runs in football history, remaining unbeaten in 31 games, spanning over four years and including the Match of the Century.

The Hungarian team faced a severe drought starting from their elimination at the 1986 World Cup, failing to qualify for a major tournament for thirty years and reaching their lowest FIFA ranking (87) in 1996, as well as finishing sixth in their group of the Euro 2008 qualifiers. They then began a turnaround, qualifying for three consecutive European Championship in 2016, 2020 and 2024, as well as achieving promotion to the 2022–23 UEFA Nations League A.

== History ==
Although Austria and Hungary were constituent countries of the dual monarchy known as the Austro-Hungarian Empire, they formed separate football associations and teams around the start of the 20th century.

=== Early years ===
==== 1910s ====
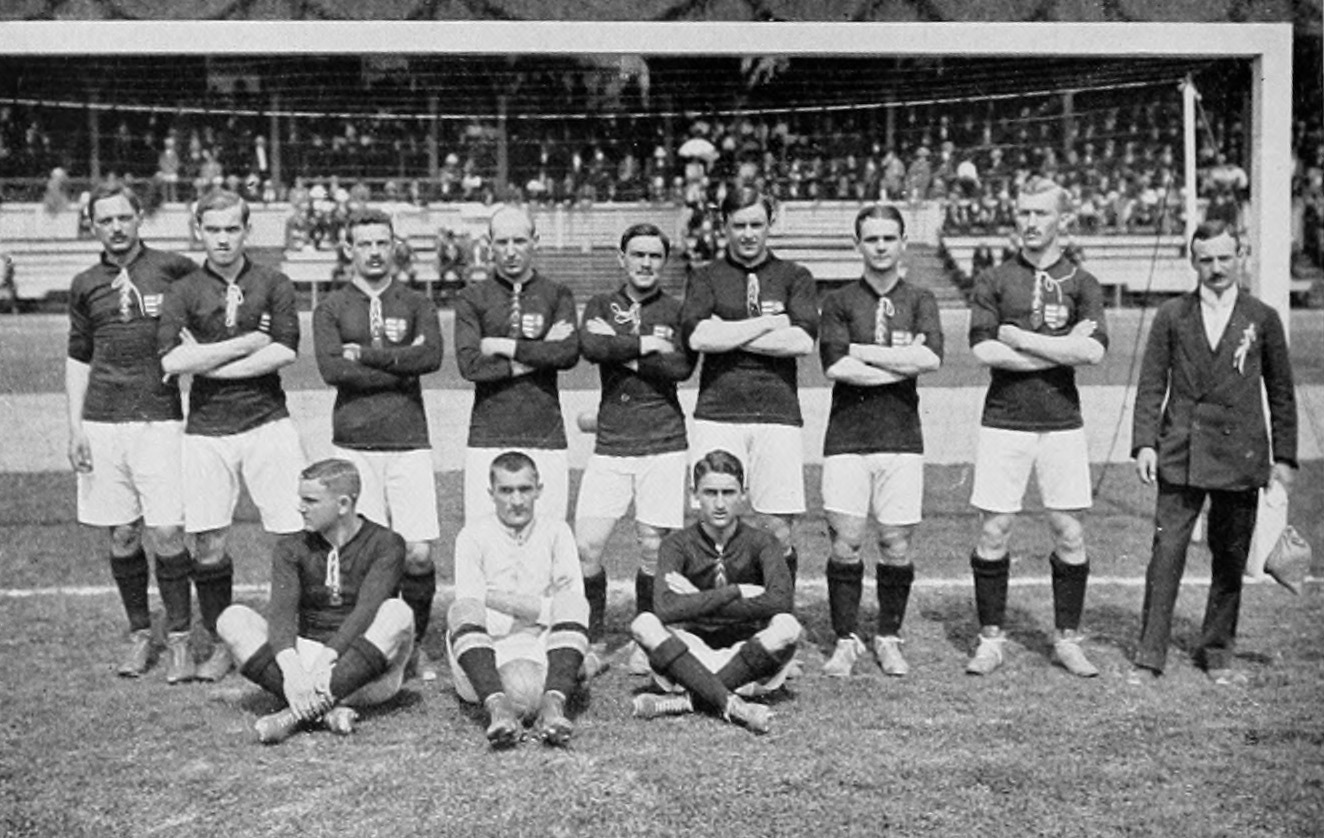
The Hungarian national team at the 1912 Summer Olympics

The national side first appeared at the Summer Olympic Games in 1912 in Stockholm, Sweden. The team had to ask for donations in order to be able to go to the Games. Hungary lost 7–0 to England and thus were eliminated. After the Olympic Games Hungary played two matches against Russia in Moscow. The first match was a 9–0 win and the second 12–0, which is still a record for the national side. The top scorer of the two matches was Imre Schlosser who scored seven goals. The beginning of World War I had a deep impact on the thriving Hungarian football. Both the country and the clubs were suffering financial problems. During WWI Hungary played Austria 16 times. In 1919 England claimed the exclusion of the Central Powers (including Hungary) from FIFA. When FIFA refused England's plea, the British (English, Scottish, Welsh, and Irish) associations decided to resign from FIFA.

==== 1920s ====
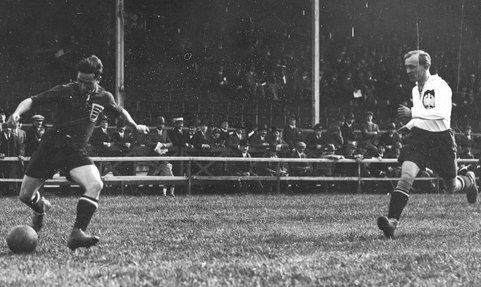
Poland-Hungary in 1924

Budapest was denied the opportunity to host the 1920 Summer Olympics, which were held in Belgium. The countries of the Central Powers (Germany, Austria-Hungary, Ottoman Empire and Bulgaria) were excluded from the Olympics. Hungary used a unique 2–3–5 formation.

During this period the Fogl brothers (József and Károly Fogl) played in the national team. Between 1921 and 1924, Béla Guttmann also played six times for the team. At the 1924 Summer Olympics in Paris, Guttmann objected to the fact that there were more officials than players in the Hungary squad and that the hotel was more suitable for socialising than match preparation, and to demonstrate his disapproval he hung dead rats on the doors of the travelling officials. At the 1924 Summer Olympics, in the first match Hungary beat Poland. They then lost to Egypt. As a consequence, both the head coach and the head of the Hungarian Football Federation resigned.

Between 1927 and 1930, Hungary participated in the Central European International Cup which is considered to be the first international tournament, with Austria, Czechoslovakia, Italy and Switzerland. In the final, Hungary lost to Italy 5–0. On 12 June 1927, Hungary beat France 13–1, which is still a record. József Takács scored six goals.

=== Golden Era ===
==== 1930s ====
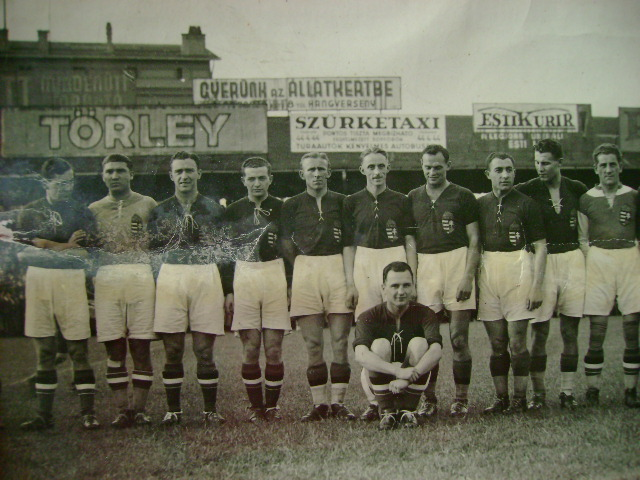
Hungary preparing for the 1938 FIFA World Cup

The first FIFA World Cup was held in Uruguay in 1930, but Hungary were not invited and did not take part in the tournament; there were no qualification matches. Hungary first appeared in the 1934 World Cup in Italy. Hungary's first World Cup match was against Egypt on 27 May 1934, a 4–2 win. The goals were scored by Pál Teleki, Géza Toldi (2) and Jenő Vincze. In the quarter-finals, Hungary faced neighbouring arch-rivals Austria and lost 2–1, the only Hungarian goal coming from György Sárosi.

Hungary entered the 1936 Olympics, where in the first round they were eliminated by Poland, 0–3.

The 1938 World Cup was held in France. The first match was played against Dutch East Indies and Hungary won 6–0. Sárosi and Gyula Zsengellér each scored twice while Vilmos Kohut and Toldi scored one goal each. In the quarter-finals, Hungary beat Switzerland 2–0 with goals by Sárosi and Zsengellér. In the semi-final at the Parc des Princes, Paris, Hungary beat Sweden 5–1 with goals by Ferenc Sas and Sárosi and a hat-trick by Zsengellér. In the final, Hungary faced Italy at the Stade Olympique de Colombes, Paris and fell 4–2. The Hungarian goals were scored by Pál Titkos and Sárosi.

==== 1950s ====
This Hungarian team of the 1950s featured strong players including Ferenc Puskás, Sándor Kocsis, József Bozsik, and Nándor Hidegkuti, known collectively as the Aranycsapat ("Golden Team") or the "Magnificent Magyars". The team achieved a record of 43 victories, 6 draws, and 0 defeats from 14 May 1950 until they lost 3–1 to Turkey on 19 February 1956.

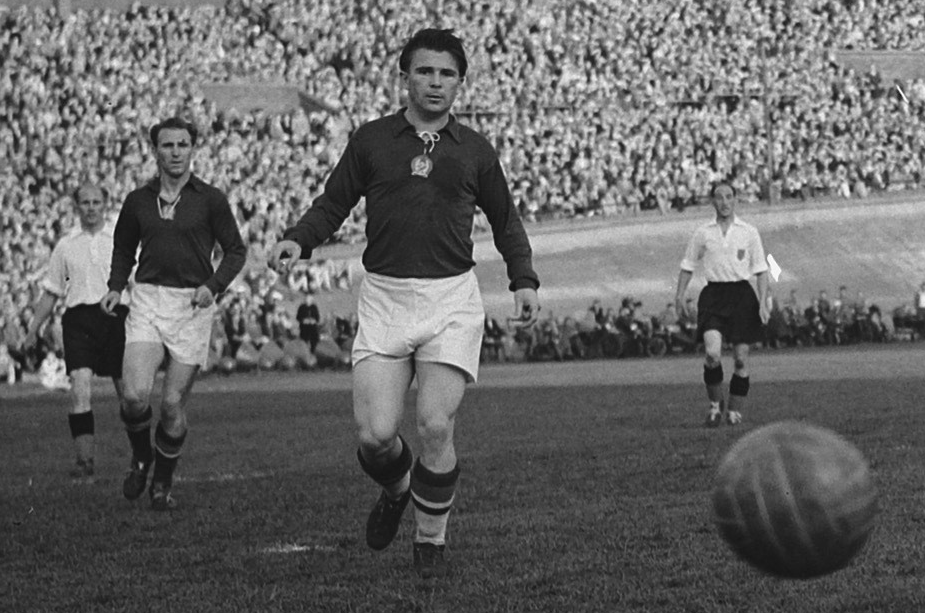
Puskás with Hidegkuti in 1954 in Budapest

In the 1952 Summer Olympics in Helsinki, Hungary beat Romania 2–1 with a goal each from Czibor and Kocsis in the preliminary round. In the first round Hungary beat Italy 3–0; in the quarter-finals Hungary beat Turkey 7–1; and in the semi-finals Hungary faced Sweden, the 1948 Olympic champions and won 6–0. In the final, Hungary beat Yugoslavia 2–0 with a goal each from Puskás and Czibor and thus won the Olympic title for the first time.

On 25 November 1953, England played Hungary at Wembley Stadium, London in a match later dubbed as the "match of the century". The English team were unbeaten for 90 years at home. In front of 105,000 spectators Nándor Hidegkuti scored in the first minute. At half-time the score was 4–2 to Hungary. In the second half the Hungarians scored twice more (Hidegkúti and József Bozsik). The final score was 6–3.

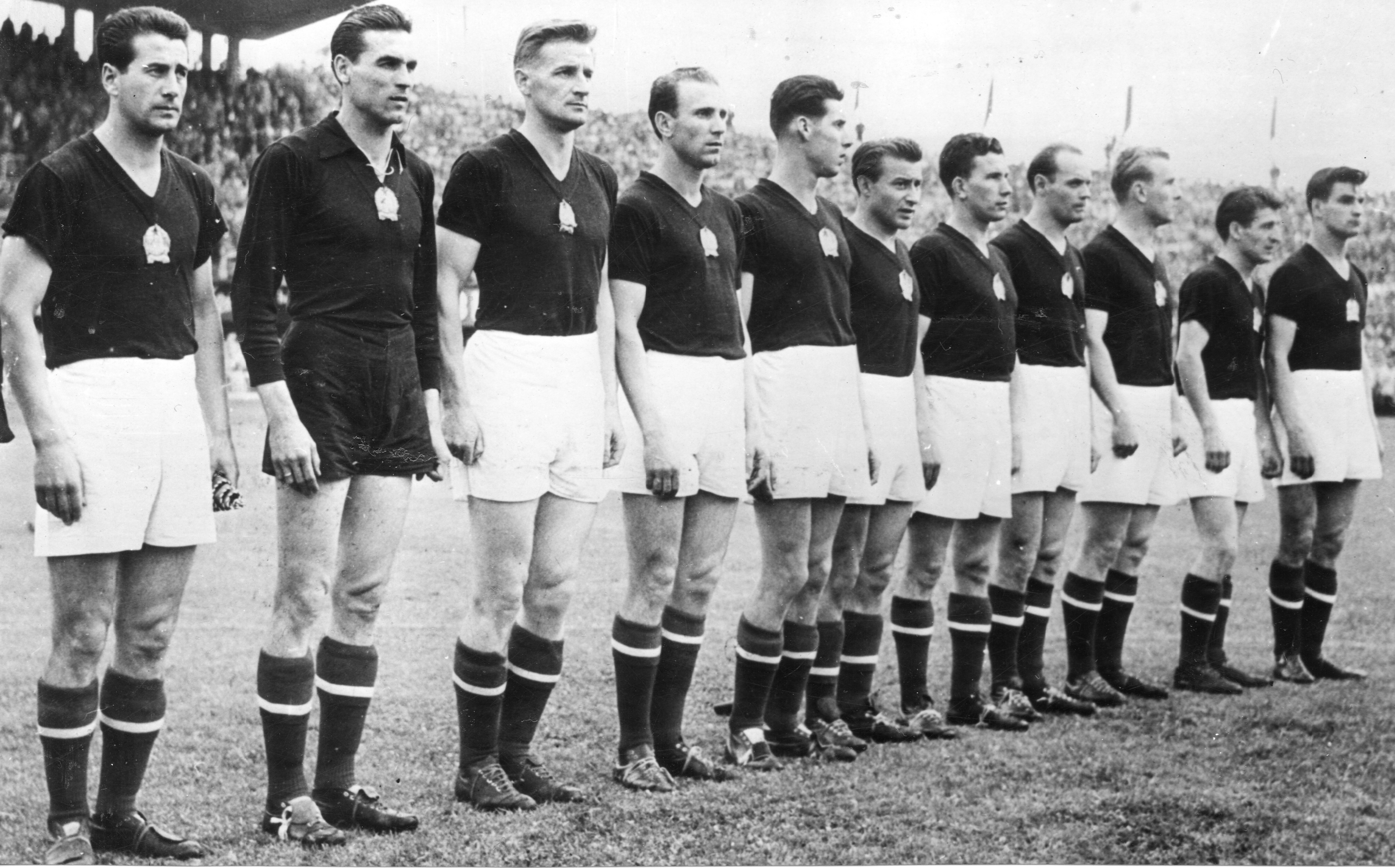
The Golden Team in 1954

On 23 May 1954, the Hungary national team beat England 7–1 (which remains their worst defeat to date) at the Puskás Ferenc Stadium. At that time in Hungary there was a saying about the match: Az angolok egy hétre jöttek és hét-egyre mentek, which is a double play on words. The word "week" in Hungarian is called "hét", meaning the number seven: "the English came for one week and left with 7:1."

The 1954 World Cup was held in Switzerland. The first match was played against South Korea and Hungary won 9–0 at the Hardturm, Zürich. In the second group match, Hungary played against West Germany and won 8–3 at St. Jakob Stadium, Basel. In the quarter-finals, Hungary beat Brazil 4–2 at the Wankdorf Stadium, Bern. In the semi-finals, Hungary faced two-time World Cup winner Uruguay in Lausanne; Hungary won 4–2 after extra time. In the final, Hungary played West Germany again. Although Hungary won the group match against the Germans, they lost 3–2 in the final in Bern at the Wankdorf Stadium. The Golden Team, built around the legendary Ferenc Puskás, led 2–0, but ended up losing 2–3 in a game the West Germans subsequently christened "The Miracle of Bern". In 2010, journalist Erik Eggers speculates in a study that the German team may have used drugs to beat the Hungarian team, who were considered "invincible" at that time.

Hungary saw the 1956 revolution break out just weeks before the 1956 Olympics in Melbourne, which was also the scene of the Blood in the Water Match. The football team also qualified as the defending champions, but they were withdrawn from the tournament. The political situation in Hungary caused several athletes to defect during the Olympics, including key players in the team. This marked the effective end of the Golden Team, as they would never play for the national team again. Among others, Puskás moved to Real Madrid and later played for Spain, whereas Kocsis and Czibor left for Barcelona.

Hungary qualified for the 1958 World Cup in Sweden. They played their first match against Wales at the Jarnvallen stadium in Sandviken and drew 1–1. The second group match was played against hosts Sweden, where Hungary lost 2–1 at the Råsunda Stadium, Solna. Although Hungary won their last group match against Mexico at the Jarnvallen stadium in Sandvinken, they were eliminated from the World Cup after losing a play-off to Wales, who they had drawn level with on points. The Welsh had drawn all their group matches and then beat the once-mighty Hungarians in a play-off match to decide which nation should follow Sweden into the knock-out stage. Had goal difference been the decider, Hungary would have gone through, as the Hungarians had a goal tally of 6–3 compared to 2–2 for Wales. As it was, Wales instead met Brazil in the quarter-finals and were the recipient of young Pelé's first World Cup goal.

==== 1960s ====
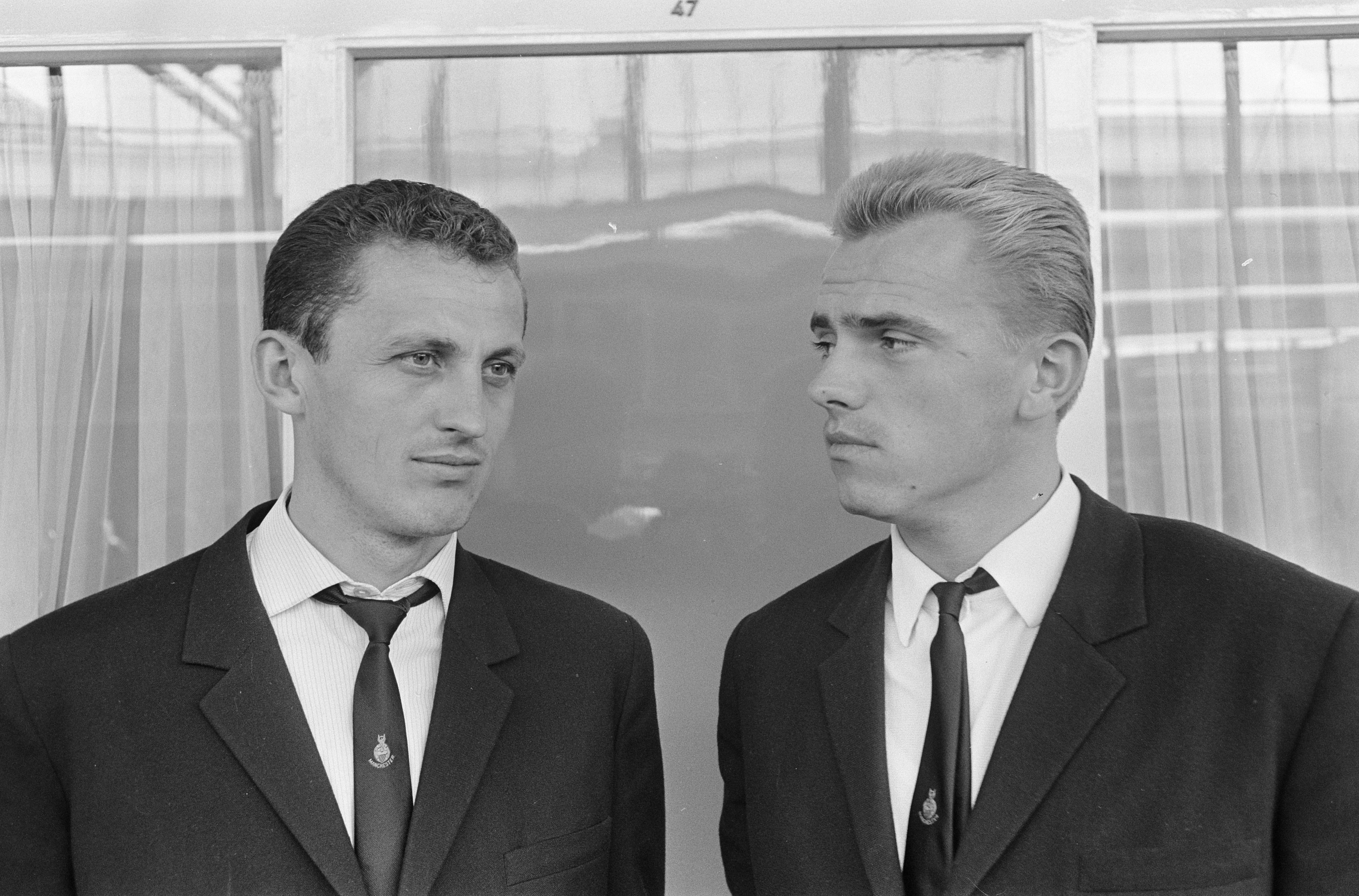
Flórián Albert (1941–2011) and Kálmán Mészöly (1941–2022)

In 1960, Hungary entered the Olympics held in Rome and was drawn into Group D with France, Peru and India. Hungary finished top of the group after winning all matches by a combined goal difference of +12. In the semi-finals, they lost to Denmark 0–2, but beat Italy in the bronze medal match 2–1 thanks to a goals from Orosz,Dunai and Armin.

Hungary qualified for the 1962 World Cup, held in Chile. On 31 May 1962, in the first group match, Hungary beat England 2–1 thanks to goals scored by Lajos Tichy and Flórián Albert at El Teniente stadium in Rancagua. The second match on 3 June was even more convincing against Bulgaria; the match was won 6–1 in Rancagua. The last group match was against Argentina and it was a goalless draw. Hungary qualified for the quarter-finals by gaining five points and winning the group. In the quarter-finals, however, Hungary was eliminated by Czechoslovakia by 1–0 at El Teniente.

In 1964, Hungary again qualified for the 1964 Olympics held in Tokyo and was drawn into Group B with defending champions Yugoslavia, Morocco and North Korea, the latter withdrawing. In their first match against Morocco, Hungary won 6–0 with all six goals scored by Ferenc Bene. In their second match, Hungary won narrowly (6–5) against Yugoslavia and advanced into the next round along with runners-up Yugoslavia. In the quarter-finals, Hungary beat Romania 2–0 with goals from Csernai. In the semi-finals, they beat United Arab Republic (Egypt) 6–0 with four goals from Bene and two from Komora. In the final, Hungary beat Czechoslovakia 2–1 thanks from an own goal by Weiss and a goal by Bene, winning their second gold medal.

Hungary qualified for the 1964 European Nations' Cup which was held in Spain. They played against Spain in the semi-finals, losing 2–1 after extra time. The only Hungarian goal was scored by Ferenc Bene. In the third place play-off Hungary beat Denmark 3–1 after extra time.

Hungary also managed to qualify for the 1966 World Cup which was held in England. On 13 July, Hungary lost their first group match against Eusébio's Portugal (3–1) at Old Trafford in Manchester. Two days later, in the second group match Hungary beat Brazil at Goodison Park, Liverpool. In the last group match, on 20 July, Hungary beat Bulgaria 3–1. Hungary finished second in the group and qualified for the quarter-finals, where they were eliminated by the Soviet Union 2–1 at Roker Park in Sunderland.

In 1968 Olympics, Hungary qualified as defending champions to defend their title and was drawn into Group C with Israel, Ghana and El Salvador. Hungary finished top and advanced into the next round with Israel. In the quarter-finals, Hungary beat Guatemala narrowly, 1–0. In the semi-finals, they beat Japan 5–0. In the final, they beat Bulgaria 4–1 and won their third title, being the most successful team at the Olympics in football (Great Britain also won three titles but their first title is in 1904, and football only became an official event in 1908). However, Hungary failed to qualify for the 1970 FIFA World Cup, following a heavy 4–1 defeat to Czechoslovakia during a qualification play-off, which many see as the beginning of a period of long-standing decline.

Flórián Albert was named European Footballer of the Year in 1967. He scored 255 goals in 351 matches from 1958 to 1974.

=== Slow regression ===
==== 1970s ====
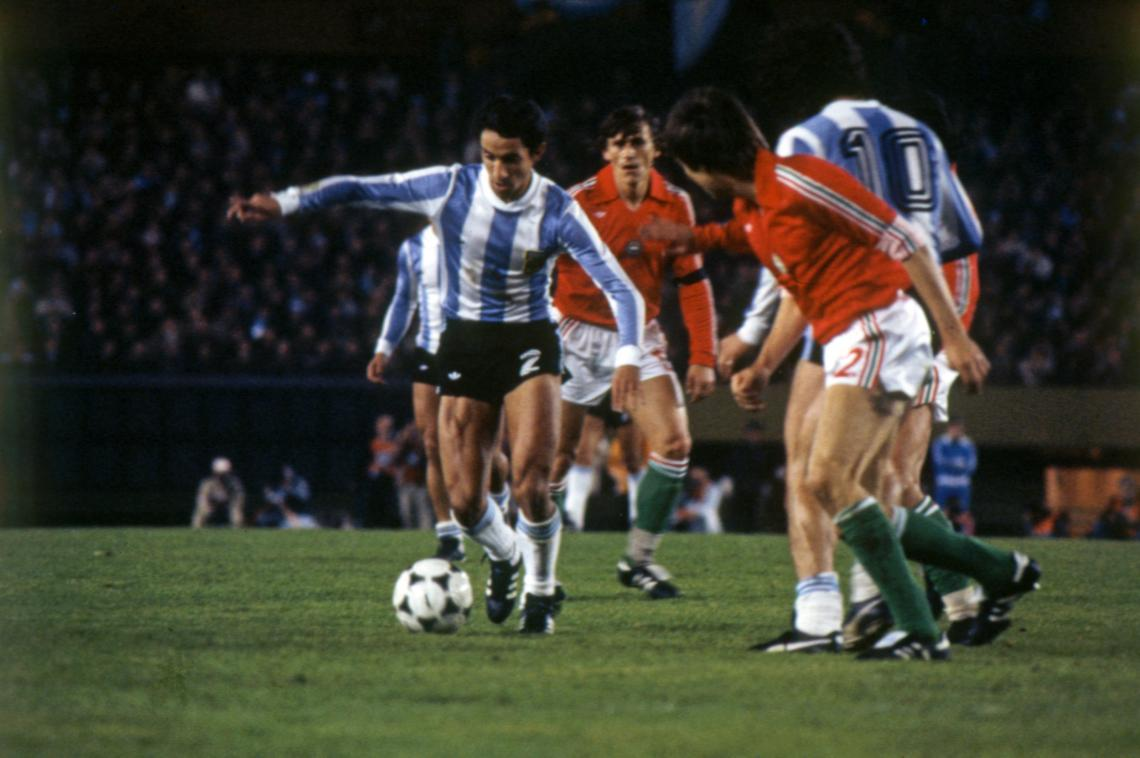
Zombori and Martos against Ardiles and Kempes at the 1978 FIFA World Cup

Hungary came back again as long-time defending champions in the 1972 Olympics in Munich and was drawn into Group C with Denmark, Iran and Brazil. They finished top and advanced into the next round with Denmark. In their second group round, they were drawn into Group 1 with East Germany, West Germany and Mexico. They again finished top undefeated and advanced into the finals with East Germany. In the finals, they faced Poland and lost 1–2.

Hungary qualified for the finals of the UEFA Euro 1972 which was held in Belgium. In the semi-finals, Hungary faced the Soviet Union and lost 1–0. In the third place play-off, Hungary lost to Belgium 2–1. The Hungarians would not appear at the European Championship again until Euro 2016.

Hungary participated in the 1978 World Cup which was held in Argentina. Facing the hosts, Argentina won the match 2–1. Hungary played their second group match against Italy and the Azzurri emerged victorious, 3–1. Hungary's third match was played against Michel Platini's France losing 3–1.

==== 1980s ====
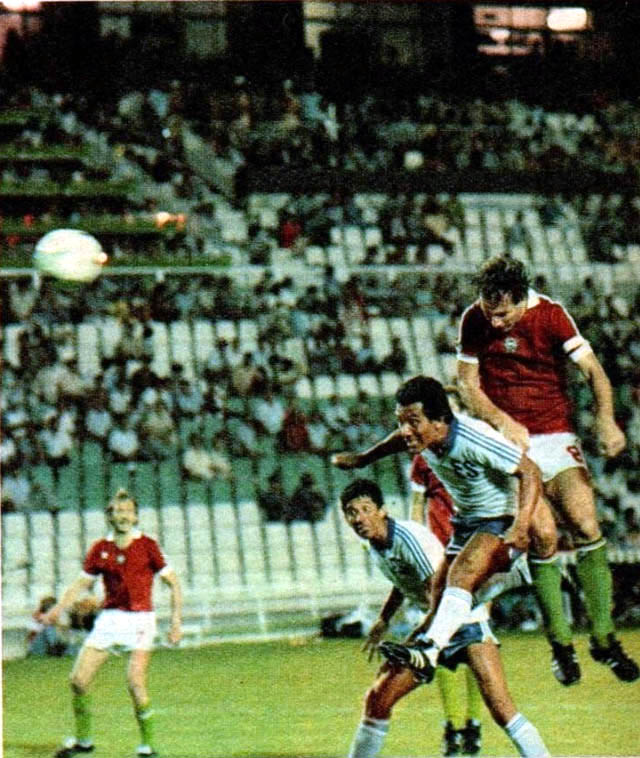
Nyilasi scored Hungary's tenth goal in the 83rd minute against El Salvador during the 10-1 win at the 1982 FIFA World Cup

During the 1980s, Hungary qualified for the World Cup twice. The first group match of the 1982 tournament in Spain was played against El Salvador, where Hungary won 10–1 at Estadio Nuevo, Elche. After the massive win, the Magyars lost to 4–1 to Diego Maradona's Argentina in the second match of the group stages. Maradona scored twice, while the only Hungarian goal was scored by Pölöskei at the Estadio José Rico Pérez in Alicante. After Hungary drew in the last match against Belgium, they were eliminated from the World Cup.

Hungary's last World Cup appearance to date was the 1986 World Cup in Mexico. In the first match of the group Hungary lost 6–0 to the Soviet Union. Although Hungary won their second match against Canada 2–0, they lost to Michel Platini's France 3–0 in the last group match.

=== Era of decline ===
==== 1990s ====
During the 1990s, Hungary were not able to qualify for any international tournaments except for the 1996 Summer Olympics held in Atlanta. In 1996, the team reached its lowest FIFA World Ranking at 87th. The fall of the Hungarian communist regime caused financial problems to many Hungarian clubs. Formerly successful clubs like Ferencváros and Újpest faced financial crisis and bankruptcy. This had a profound effect on the Hungary national team as well, as earlier, the biggest clubs from Budapest (Ferencváros, Újpest, Honvéd and MTK) produced players for the national side. Another important reason for the decline can be attributed to the Bosman ruling; since the Hungarian clubs lost the financial aid from the state in the early 1990s, they were not able to compete with richer Western European clubs.

Hungarian legend Ferenc Puskás was appointed as the head coach of the national side in 1993. He led the team for only four matches, however, as the former Honvéd and Real Madrid star failed to make an impact. The only success in the 1990s was the qualification of Hungary to the 1996 Summer Olympics. Antal Dunai's team played its first group match against Nigeria and lost to 1–0 in Orlando. In the second group match, Hungary played Brazil and lost 3–1. The last group match was played against Japan, a 3–2 loss. Hungary were eliminated in the 1998 World Cup qualifying play-offs by Yugoslavia with a 12–1 aggregate score.

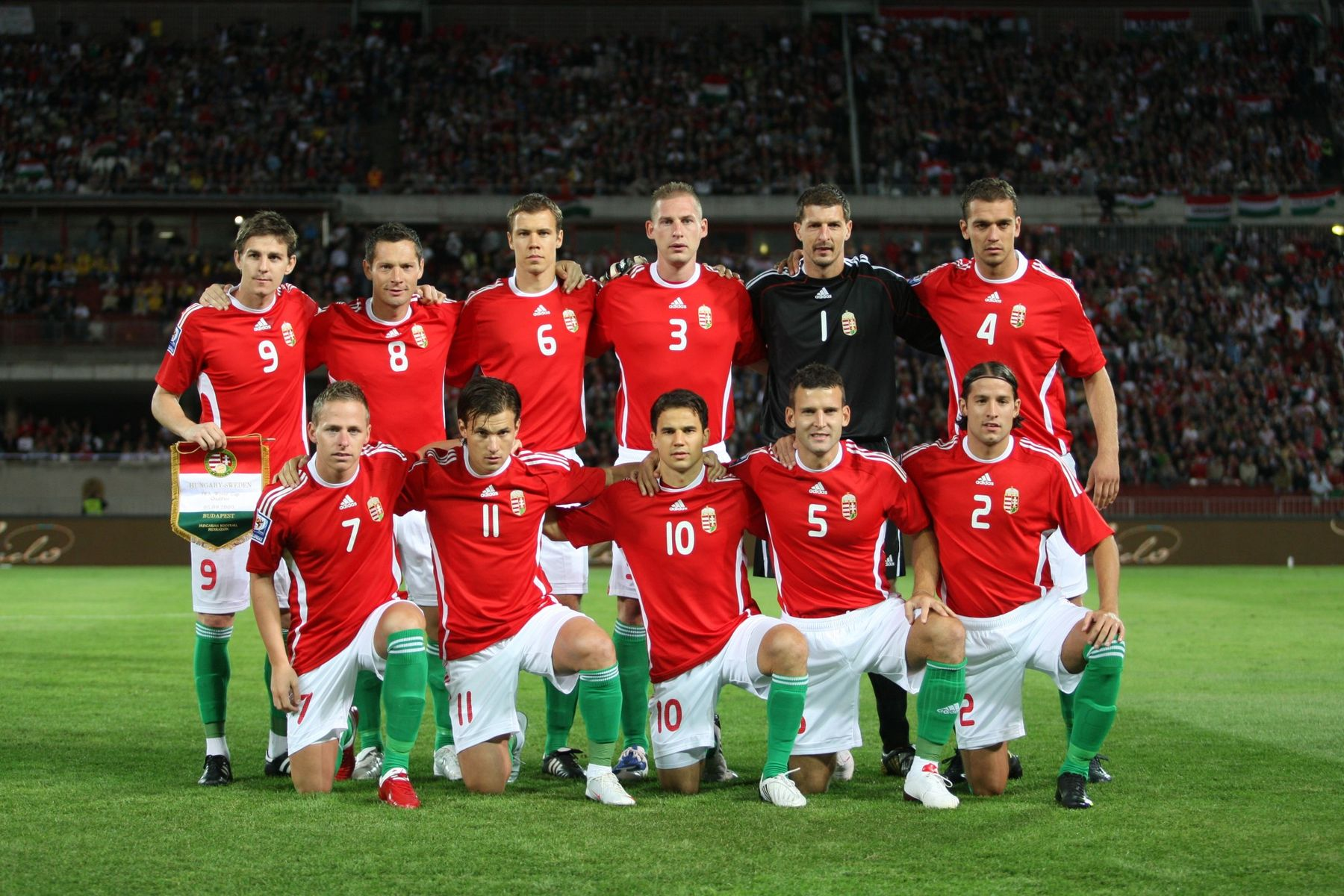
Hungary in 2010 FIFA World Cup qualification against Sweden at Ferenc Puskás Stadium on 5 September 2009

==== 2000s ====
During the 2000s, the Hungarian national soccer team faced several challenges and did not achieve significant success in major international tournaments. They struggled to qualify for major competitions like the FIFA World Cup and the UEFA European Championship. Despite their efforts, the team often fell short in the qualification stages, which was a source of disappointment for fans and players alike. The lack of consistent performance and the inability to compete at the highest levels led to a period of stagnation for Hungarian soccer on the international stage.

However, there was a bright spot in 2009 when the Hungary U-20 team won a bronze medal at the FIFA U-20 World Cup in Egypt. The U-20 team's success was seen as a potential turning point for Hungarian soccer, highlighting the country's ability to develop young talent, including Vladimir Koman and Ádám Szalai.

Throughout the decade, Hungarian clubs also made some progress in European competitions, though they did not reach the later stages. The domestic league saw fluctuating performances, with clubs like Ferencváros and Debrecen occasionally making it to the group stages of the UEFA Champions League and UEFA Europa League.

=== Resurgence ===
==== 2010s ====
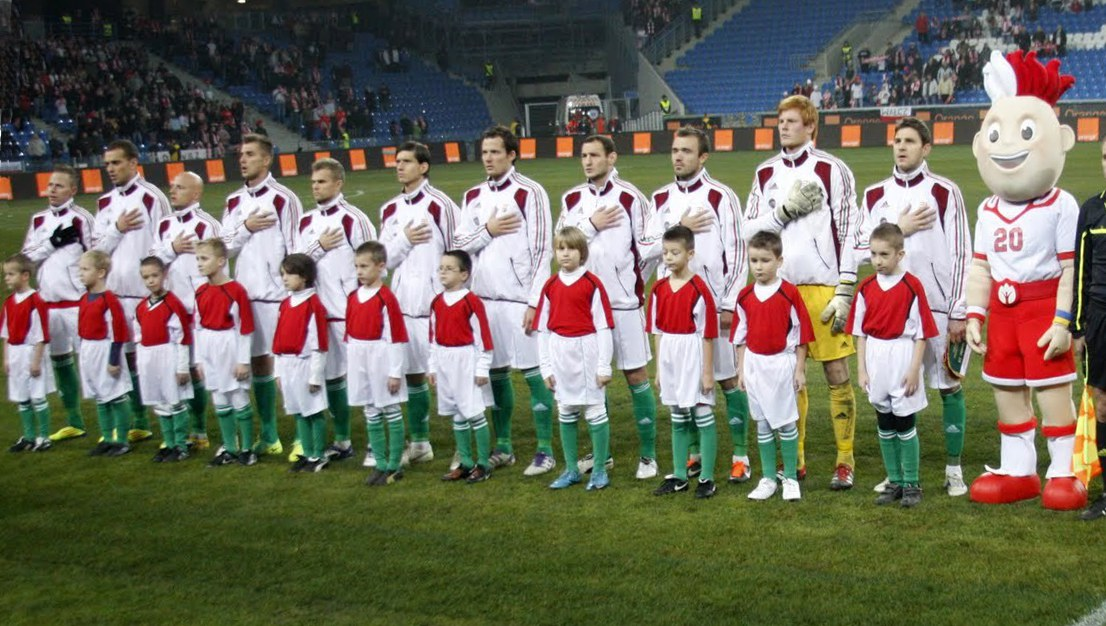
Hungary in a friendly tie against Poland on 15 November 2011 at the Stadion Miejski, Poznań, Poland. The line-up included Dzsudzsák, Juhász, Varga, Priskin, Koman, Laczkó, Tőzsér, Vanczák, Sándor, Bogdán and Gera

The Hungary national under-20 team head coach Sándor Egervári was appointed as head coach for the senior side ahead of Euro 2012 qualifying in which Hungary were drawn against Finland, Moldova, the Netherlands, San Marino and Sweden. Hungary won six, drew one and lost three games as they finished the group in third place with 19 points. During the qualification process, in September 2011, Hungary reached the 27th place in the FIFA World Ranking, their highest position to date. At the end of the year, the national team played Liechtenstein as a commemoration of the recently deceased Flórián Albert, the only Hungarian football player to win the Ballon d'Or.

Hungary were drawn in Group D in their 2014 World Cup qualifying, along with the Netherlands, Turkey, Romania, Estonia and Andorra. They amassed 14 points entering the penultimate round of games, but suffered a joint national record defeat 8–1 to the Netherlands, which resulted in the resignation of head coach Sándor Egervári. For their final group game, a 2–0 win against Andorra, Hungary were led by caretaker manager József Csábi. They finished in third place in the group, on 17 points, missing out on qualification.

Attila Pintér was appointed as head coach of the national team in December 2013. Some had seen this decision as controversial, given Pintér's low popularity with fans and players alike. The team played their first game at the newly constructed Groupama Arena on 7 September 2014, a 2–1 defeat to Northern Ireland in Euro 2016 qualifying. Pintér was subsequently dismissed, with Pál Dárdai appointed as a temporary replacement for three matches. He turned down an offer to manage the team on a permanent basis, but was kept on.

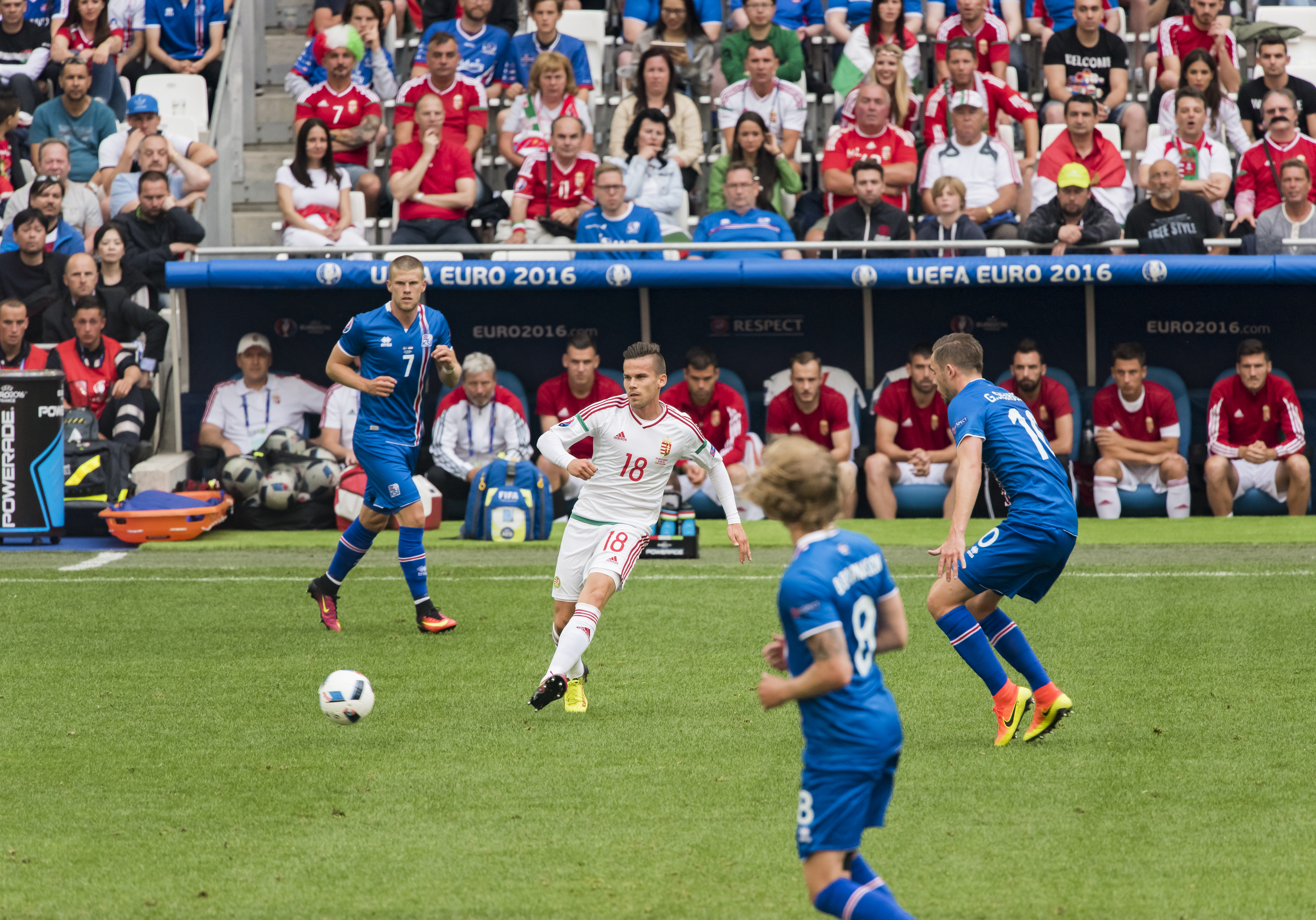
Stieber against Guðmundsson, Bjarnason and Sigurðsson of Iceland, during Hungary's second group match of UEFA Euro 2016

On 15 November 2015, a Storck-led Hungary qualified for its first European Championship (UEFA Euro 2016) in 44 years and its major tournament in 30 years. Hungary beat Norway in the first leg of the qualifying playoffs 1–0; the only goal was scored by László Kleinheisler. On the return match, Hungary beat Norway 2–1 and qualified for the Euro 2016 finals. After beating Austria 2–0 and drawing with Iceland, Hungary played an exciting 3–3 draw against eventual Euro winners Portugal. Hereupon, Hungary managed to qualify for the round of 16 with a game to spare, marking their best Euro or World Cup performance in over 40 years.

Hungary failed to qualify for the 2018 FIFA World Cup in Russia after finishing outside of the qualification places. Along the way, they drew against the Faroe Islands and were humiliated after being defeated by Andorra 1–0. After failing to qualify, manager Bernd Storck resigned. On 10 November 2017, Hungary was embarrassed again when they were defeated by Luxembourg 2–1 in a friendly. On 30 October 2017, Georges Leekens was appointed as a new head coach. Hungary lost both matches in March 2018. The first defeat was another embarrassing one against minnows Kazakhstan (2–3).

On 19 June 2018, after three losses and one draw under his reign, Leekens was let go and Marco Rossi was appointed in his place.

2018–19 UEFA Nations League C saw Hungary drawn with Finland, Greece and Estonia. Hungary had a nearly successful performance, but losses to Finland and Greece shattered their hope to finish in the top of the group. However, UEFA revised the formula aftermath, meaning Hungary was officially promoted to 2020–21 UEFA Nations League B, having finished second before.

The UEFA Euro 2020 qualifying drew a mixed result for the Hungarians. Grouped in group E, they faced Croatia, Wales, Slovakia and Azerbaijan; the former occupied the silver medal in the 2018 FIFA World Cup while the latter was one of 12 host countries in the tournament. Hungary performed successfully against Croatia and Wales at home, obtaining needed victories, as well as successive wins over Azerbaijan. However, two straight defeats to Slovakia and away losses to Croatia and Wales, with the final loss happening when Hungary had a chance to qualify directly, sent Hungary into a disappointing fourth-place finish to the benefit of the Welsh, who qualified directly instead. Hungary was able to obtain a play-off spot thanks to finishing second in their group at the Nations League, behind Finland, and was scheduled against Bulgaria.

==== 2020s ====
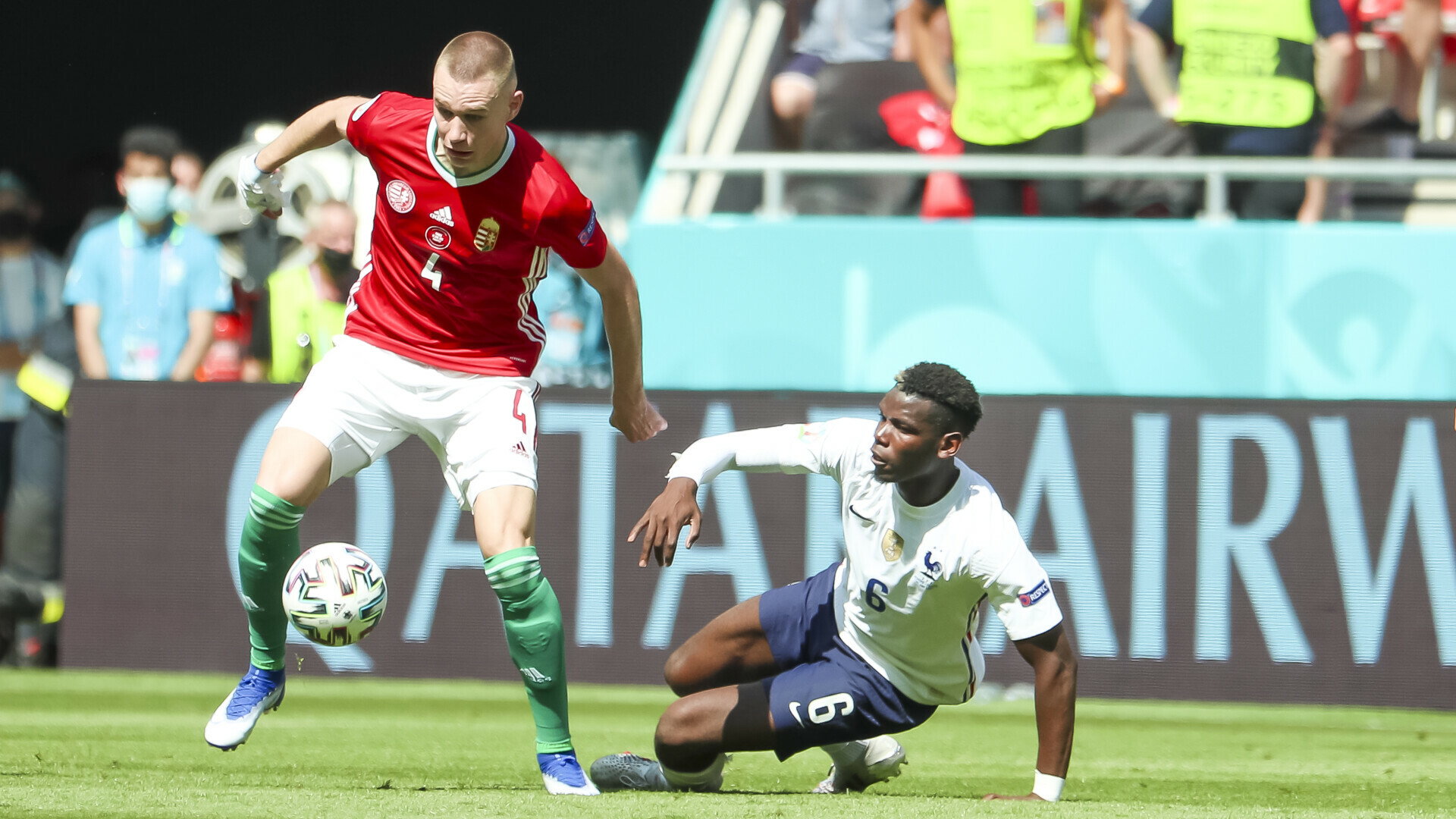
Szalai against Pogba of France, during Hungary's second group match of UEFA Euro 2020

While Hungary could only gain a play-off spot in the hopes of reaching the UEFA Euro 2020, Hungary's strong result in the preceding Nations League generated more optimism. Hungary began their quest in 2020–21 UEFA Nations League B sharing a group with Russia, Turkey and Serbia. Hungary impressed in their 1–0 victory against host Turkey, Dominik Szoboszlai scoring the game's only goal with a 30-meter free kick. However, Hungary faced a setback when Russia, who Hungary had failed to win against since 1978, beat them at home 3–2. A series of good results followed, with two draws against Russia and Serbia, an important away win over the Serbs in Belgrade, and a much-needed 2–0 win over Turkey at home. This meant that Hungary was able to gain promotion at the expense of Russia to the 2022–23 UEFA Nations League A.

In October 2020, Hungary participated in the play-offs to qualify for UEFA Euro 2020, where they faced Bulgaria in their first game of the play-off series. After making an away trip to Sofia, Hungary shone with a 3–1 win to reach the final of the play-off to face Iceland a month later, behind closed doors. The team qualified for the tournament winning 2–1, with last-minute strikes from Loïc Nego and Dominik Szoboszlai to take Hungary into the competition despite an earlier mistake by Péter Gulácsi.

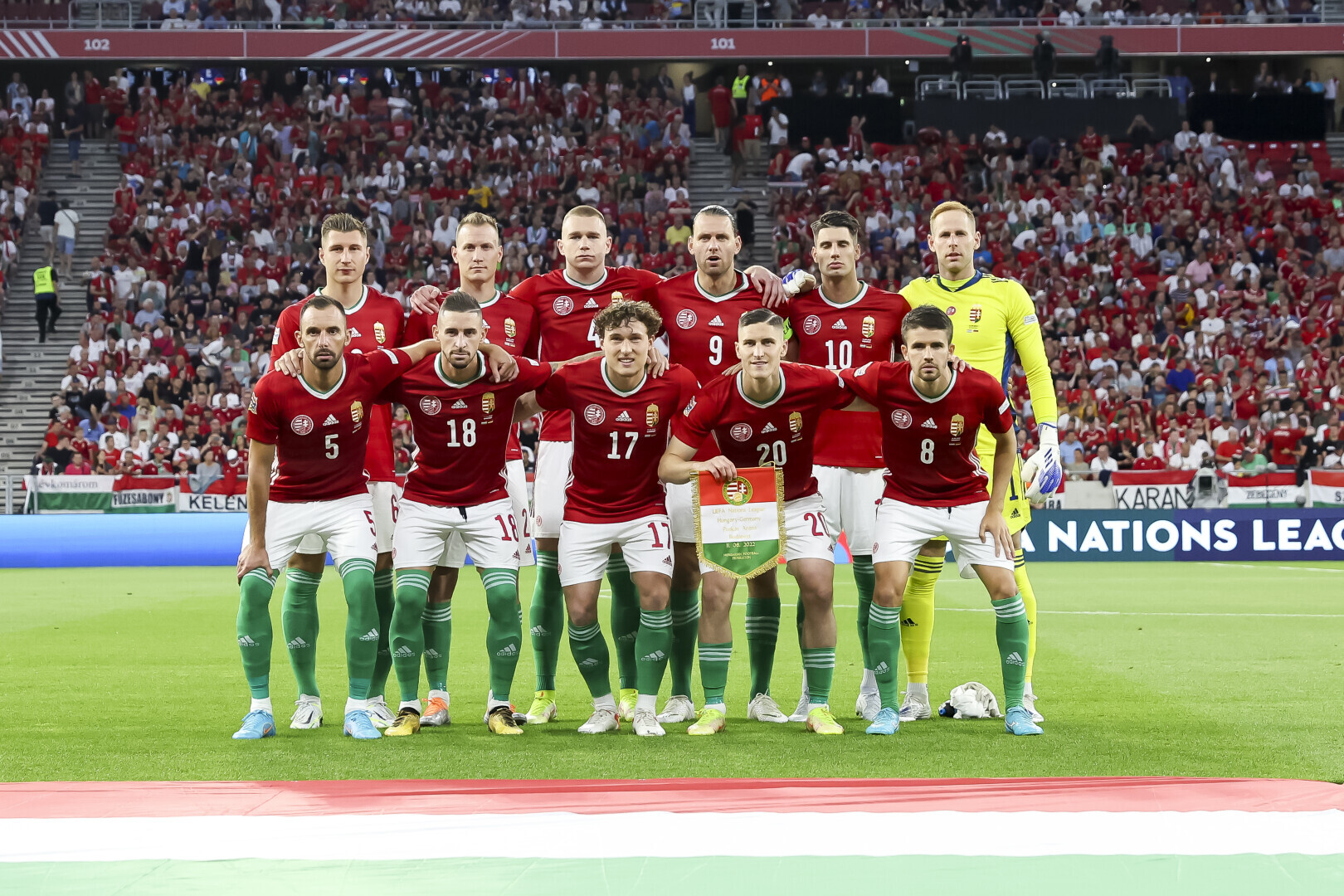
Hungary national team in 2022 against Germany in Nations League

With Euro 2020 being postponed to 2021 because of COVID-19, Hungary was drawn in the "group of death" of the tournament. Group F featured Portugal, the defending European champions, France, the defending World Champions and the runner-up at the previous tournament, and Germany. Despite losing 3–0 to Portugal, the Hungarians recorded two points against France and Germany.

2022 again brought the "group of death" for Hungary, as during the 2022–23 UEFA Nations League the team had to face three former world champions in group A3: Italy, Germany, and England. While the team was widely considered to be a key contestant for relegation prior to the matches, the Red-White-Greens beat Euro 2020 runner-up England 1–0 with a Dominik Szoboszlai penalty an hour into the match. After the victory, the team suffered a 2–1 defeat against Italy in Cesena, nevertheless, an early Zsolt Nagy goal that was equalized by Jonas Hofmann resulted in a 1–1 draw against Germany, placing the team second in the group behind Italy. On 14 June, Hungary visited England in Wolverhampton, achieving a stunning 0–4 victory against Gareth Southgate's squad, taking the lead in their group after Italy's defeat to Germany. For the last two matchdays, Hungary couldn't be relegated unless they lost to England and England defeated both Germany and Italy. Although England would lose 1–0 to Italy and as a result were relegated in the Nations League with a match to spare anyways, the Hungarians didn't want to rely on other results as Ádám Szalai, the long-time forward who announced his retirement a day before the match, scored a heeler to win the game against Germany 1–0 in Leipzig. On 26 September, Hungary only needed a draw to qualify for the UEFA Nations League Finals; however, they lost to Italy 2–0 in the Puskás Aréna.

2023 started with a 1–0 victory over Estonia thanks to a goal from Martin Ádám. Days later, Hungary began their UEFA Euro 2024 qualifying against Bulgaria in a 3–0 victory at home with goals from Bálint Vécsei, a stunning Dominik Szoboszlai free kick and Martin Ádám sealing it on the 27th of March 2023. In June, Hungary would draw 0–0 with Montenegro, then days later secure a 2–0 victory over Lithuania with goals from Barnabás Varga and Roland Sallai. In September, Hungary would scrape a victory over Serbia 2–1. Despite an early Attila Szalai own goal, Barnabás Varga and Willi Orbán would score two minutes apart. Then a couple days later, the team achieved a 1–1 draw with Czechia with goals from Roland Sallai and Václav Jurečka. October 14, 2023, Hungary took on Serbia with another 2–1 victory. Barnabás Varga put Hungary in front before a Strahinja Pavlović equalizer, then, only a few seconds later, Roland Sallai put Hungary back in front. Zsolt Kalmár received a red card in the 90th minute of the game for Hungary. In the deciding game for Lithuania, Hungary went down 2–0 in the first half with goals from Fedor Černych and Pijus Širvys. Then a penalty was awarded in the 66th minute, which Dominik Szoboszlai scored, then Barnabás Varga equalized the game in the 81st minute, eliminating Lithuania from qualification. Finally, in November, Hungary played strong against Bulgaria, drawing 2–2 with Martin Ádám opening the scoring early for Hungary, then Spas Delev equalizing. Disasters followed for both Bulgaria and Hungary as Valentin Antov and Milos Kerkez would both collect red cards during the match. Bulgaria took the lead in the 77th minute with a penalty from Kiril Despodov. Then in the 96th minute of the game, Aleks Petkov scored an own goal, resulting in a draw to the match and keeping Hungary's unbeaten record. On the final day of qualifying,Montenegro scored the first goal in the 35th minute. In the 65th minute, Dominik Szoboszlai scored an equalizer, before scoring his second goal in the 67th minute. Then to seal qualification, Ádám Nagy scored in the 92nd minute, sending Hungary into UEFA Euro 2024.

Hungary went into 2024 positively. In their first match of the year against Turkey, Dominik Szoboszlai scored the only goal of the game with a 48th-minute penalty. Days later, Hungary came up against Kosovo and take a 2–0 victory with goals from Dominik Szoboszlai and Zsolt Nagy. In June, Hungary played two friendlies in preparation for UEFA Euro 2024. Their first game against the Republic of Ireland ended their fourteen-game unbeaten streak with a 2–1 defeat. Adam Idah opening the scoring, Ádám Lang equalizing and Troy Parrott stealing the victory in the 92nd minute. Hungary's final preparation game came against Israel, where Hungary finished with a 3–0 victory thanks to Roland Sallai, and Barnabás Varga's two goals. On June 15, 2024. Hungary played their opening game of the UEFA Euro 2024 group stage, which had them in a group with host nation Germany, Switzerland and Scotland. Their first game was against Switzerland, where they suffered a 3–1 defeat, Hungary's only goal coming from Barnabás Varga in the 66th minute. The second game was against the hosts, where Hungary again endured a defeat, 2–0 to Germany. The "dark horses" of the tournament still had one final game to play against Scotland, with the possibility of securing a spot in the last 16 if they won. The game was at a deadlock when Barnabás Varga suffered a concussion and multiple facial fractures after contesting a ball from a free kick into the box in the 69th minute. Substitute Kevin Csoboth scored a winner in the 100th minute to win the game 1–0 for Hungary and possibly send them to the round of 16. However, Hungary didn't progress, as Georgia defeated Portugal 2–0.

Hungary then played their opening game of the 2024–25 UEFA Nations League A against Germany, where Hungary suffered a heavy 5–0 defeat. Then at home against Bosnia and Herzegovina, a 0–0 draw occurred. Returning in October, Hungary faced the Netherlands where the Hungarians took the lead in the 32nd minute with a goal from Roland Sallai. In the 79th minute, Virgil van Dijk collected a second yellow card and was sent off. In the 83rd minute, Denzel Dumfries scored on a free kick. Ending in a 1–1 draw. Days later, Hungary faced Bosnia and Herzegovina again, but this time walked away with a 2–0 victory, with captain Dominik Szoboszlai scoring both goals. November was the beginning of a slight decline for the Hungarians. Facing the Netherlands again, the game started with a medical worry for Hungary's midfield coach and former player Ádám Szalai. Then the Dutch team was awarded a penalty for an occurrence before the medical injury and a VAR check. Hungary went on to win the match 4–0, confirming Hungary's spot in the 2024–25 UEFA Nations League promotion/relegation play-offs. Their final match was against Germany. After going 1–0 down in the 76th minute, a penalty kick was awarded to Hungary, where Dominik Szoboszlai scored a Panenka (penalty kick) in the 99th minute. The game finished 1–1.

2025 started poorly for the Hungarians. They started with a 3–1 loss in the first leg of the 2024–25 UEFA Nations League promotion/relegation play-offs against Turkey. András Schäfer scoring Hungary's only goal. In the second leg, Hungary suffered a 3–0 defeat (1–6 on aggregate) and a demotion into the 2026–27 UEFA Nations League B. Hungary played a two friendlies in June, losing 2–0 to Sweden and defeating Azerbaijan 2–1 with goals from Barnabás Varga and Dominik Szoboszlai. In September, Hungary played their first match of the 2026 FIFA World Cup qualification – UEFA Group F against the Republic of Ireland where Hungary took an early 2–0 lead with goals from Barnabás Varga and Roland Sallai. In the 49th minute, Hungary conceded a goal, and only minutes later, Roland Sallai received a red card out of frustration. In the 93rd minute, Adam Idah scored an equalizer to finish the game at 2–2. The second game against Portugal finished in a 3–2 defeat, with Barnabás Varga scoring two goals. Hungary would return in October to face Armenia and win 2–0 with Dániel Lukács and Zsombor Gruber scoring their first goals for Hungary.

Hungary faced Portugal away and drew 2–2 with an early goal from Attila Szalai and a 91st-minute equalizer from Dominik Szoboszlai. November started strong with a 1–0 victory over Armenia thanks to Barnabás Varga. Then it came down to the final matchday on November 16, 2025. Hungary would need a draw or a win against the Republic of Ireland to secure a play-off spot to the 2026 FIFA World Cup. It was an ideal start for the Hungarians with Dániel Lukács scoring a header in the 4th minute to put them in front. Then the Irish men scored a penalty to equalize. In the 37th minute, Barnabás Varga scored a left-footed volley into the top right corner from outside of the box to put Hungary back in front. However, Troy Parrott scored an equalizer in the 80th minute, which was still enough for Hungary. But in the 6th minute of stoppage time another Troy Parrott goal knocked Hungary out, sending the Republic of Ireland to the play-offs where they would ultimately lose on penalties to Czechia.

== Team image ==
=== Rivalry ===
Hungary has a long-standing rivalry with its neighbour Romania. The rivalry dates back to the Treaty of Trianon, where Hungary lost Transylvania to Romania, after World War I. They throw flares and matches between the two sides usually end in a fight between Hungarian and Romanian supporters; however, recently also before the matches conflicts have emerged outside the stadium. This was seen as they shared the same group in qualification for the 1982 FIFA World Cup, UEFA Euro 2000, 2002 World Cup, 2014 World Cup and UEFA Euro 2016.

The match-up between Austria and Hungary is the second most-played international in football (only Argentina–Uruguay met each other in more matches), although the two teams have only met each other three times since 2000.

=== Supporters ===
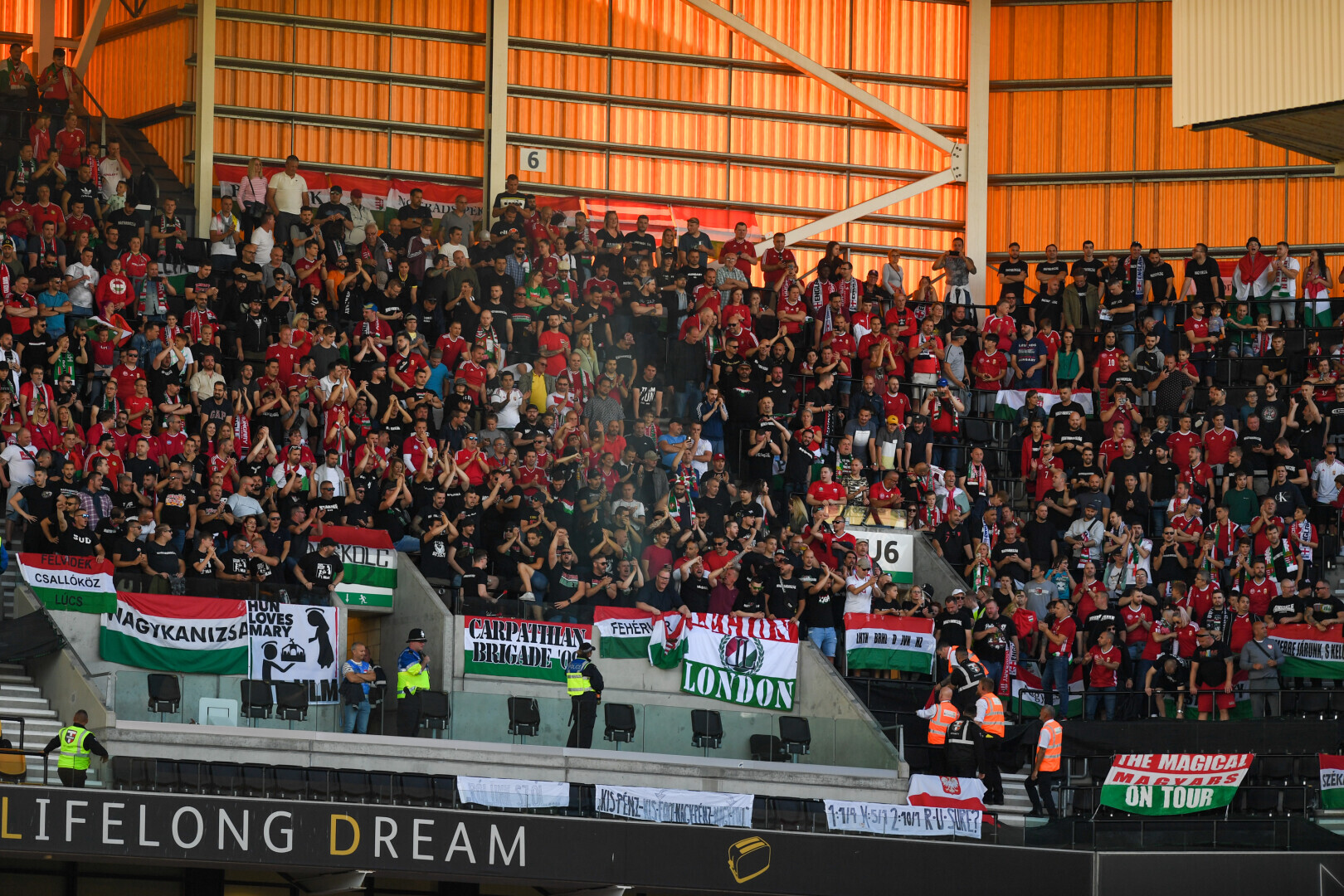
Hungarian supporters in Molineux Stadium, Wolverhampton

The Carpathian Brigade is an official supporters' group for the Hungary national football team. The first organized debut of this group was at a Hungary vs. Malta 2010 World Cup qualification match on 1 April 2009 at Ferenc Puskás Stadium.

The group was officially formed on 15 May 2009. This date has been commemorated as the group's birthday ever since, with group members displaying fireworks, pyros and organizing marches every year, to celebrate the birth of the "Brigade".

Over the early years of the 2010s, the group would establish themselves as a household name on Ferenc Puskás Stadium's B-stand, and would acquire a reputation for violence and hooliganism.

In September 2013, the Carpathian Brigade would dominate Hungarian headlines after clashing with the police, Romanian supporters, and displaying an overall unruly behaviour during an away day to Bucharest prior to a World-Cup qualifier against Romania. In hindsight, this specific tour to Romania is often considered by many as the starting point of the group's infamy.

In October 2014 Hungarian fans travelled to Bucharest en masse to support the national team in their EURO 2016 qualification game. Just like the previous year, crowd trouble and impromptu fights between Hungarian and Romanian fans occurred ahead of and during the game. After being goaded into a fight by the home fans, Hungarian ultras broke the cordon separating the two fanbases, and attempted to enter the Romanian sector. The police prevented the fight from escalating into a full-out mass brawl, by using teargas to separate the crowd. The two sets of fans also clashed with the local police force as well.

In September 2015, Hungary would host Romania for a Euro qualifier in Budapest. On the eve of the match Hungarian fans were looking for Romanians in downtown Budapest, but their effort to fight was spoilt by the police. Prior to the match, members of the Carpathian Brigade attacked the police force and attempted to fight Romanian fans. This would mark one of the most violent days in Hungarian hooligan history. Hungarian ultras hurled beer cans and rocks at the police and threw pyros at a group of Middle Eastern migrants taking refuge at Keleti station. 51 people were detained after the game, four of whom were Romanian. 38 people needed medical help, and six police officers were taken to hospital. Numerous police cars were set on fire, and the outbreak of fighting rendered some trams to temporarily halt functioning.

Heavy support for the Hungary national team also comes from Transylvania, Slovakia, Vojvodina, Zakarpattia and Western Europe.

=== Kits and crest ===
Hungary's traditional home colours are cherry red shirts, white shorts and green socks. The combination of the colours represent the Hungarian flag. However, the team sometimes wears all white kit even at home. The coat of arms are worn on the left side of the shirt, where the human heart can be found. When the Hungarian players listen to the national anthem of Hungary, "Himnusz", they usually put their arms on to their chest. The current coat of arms could have always been found on the shirt of the national team in contrast with many other national teams which wear the logo of the football federation. Adidas is currently the designer of the Hungary kits.

==== Kit suppliers ====
Kit supplier	Period
(Hungary) In-House	1902–1976
(United Kingdom) Umbro	1966
(West Germany) Adidas	1976–1989
(United Kingdom) Umbro	1990–1994
(Germany) Adidas	1995–present

== Home stadium ==
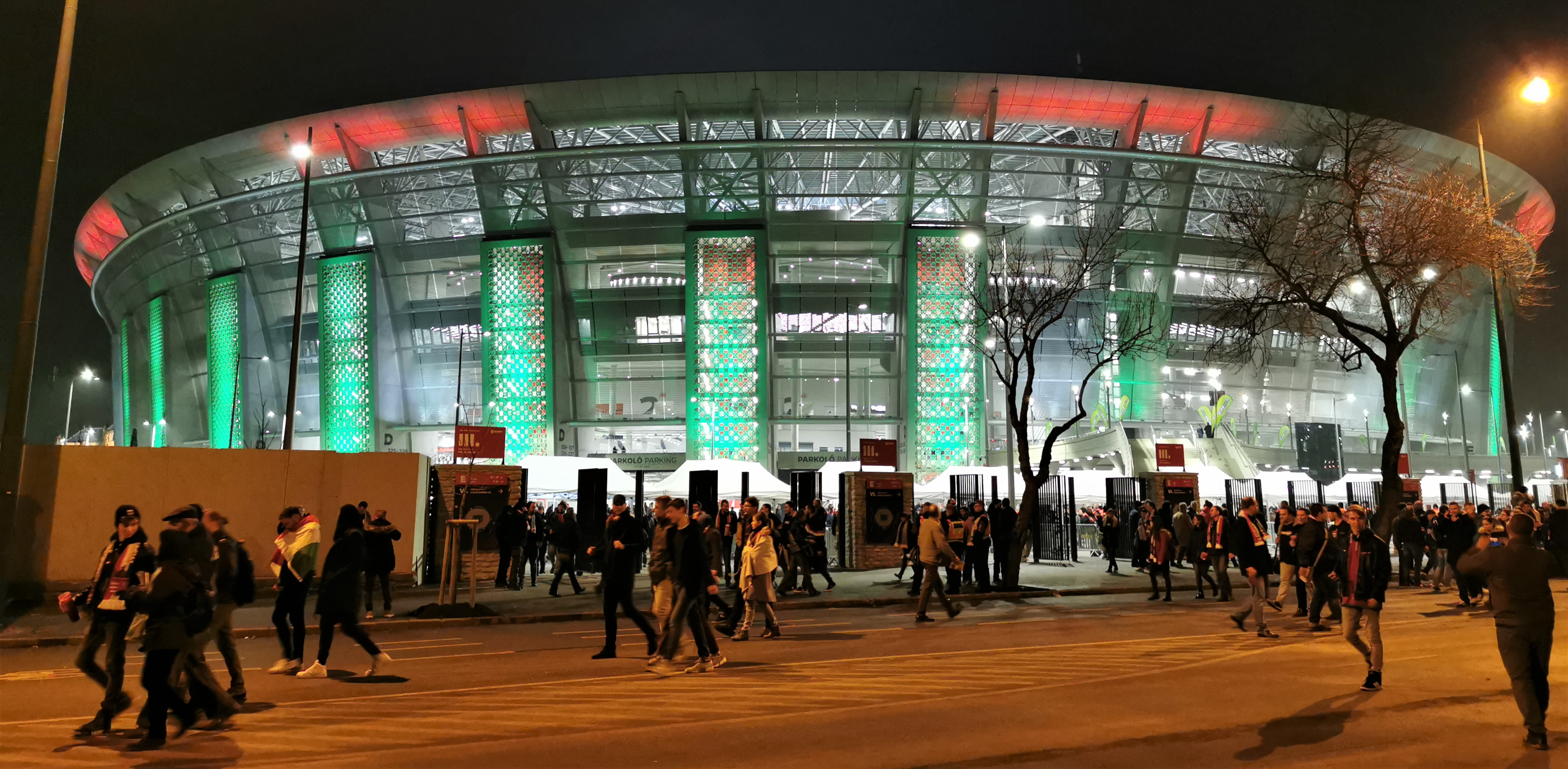
Exterior of the Puskás Aréna

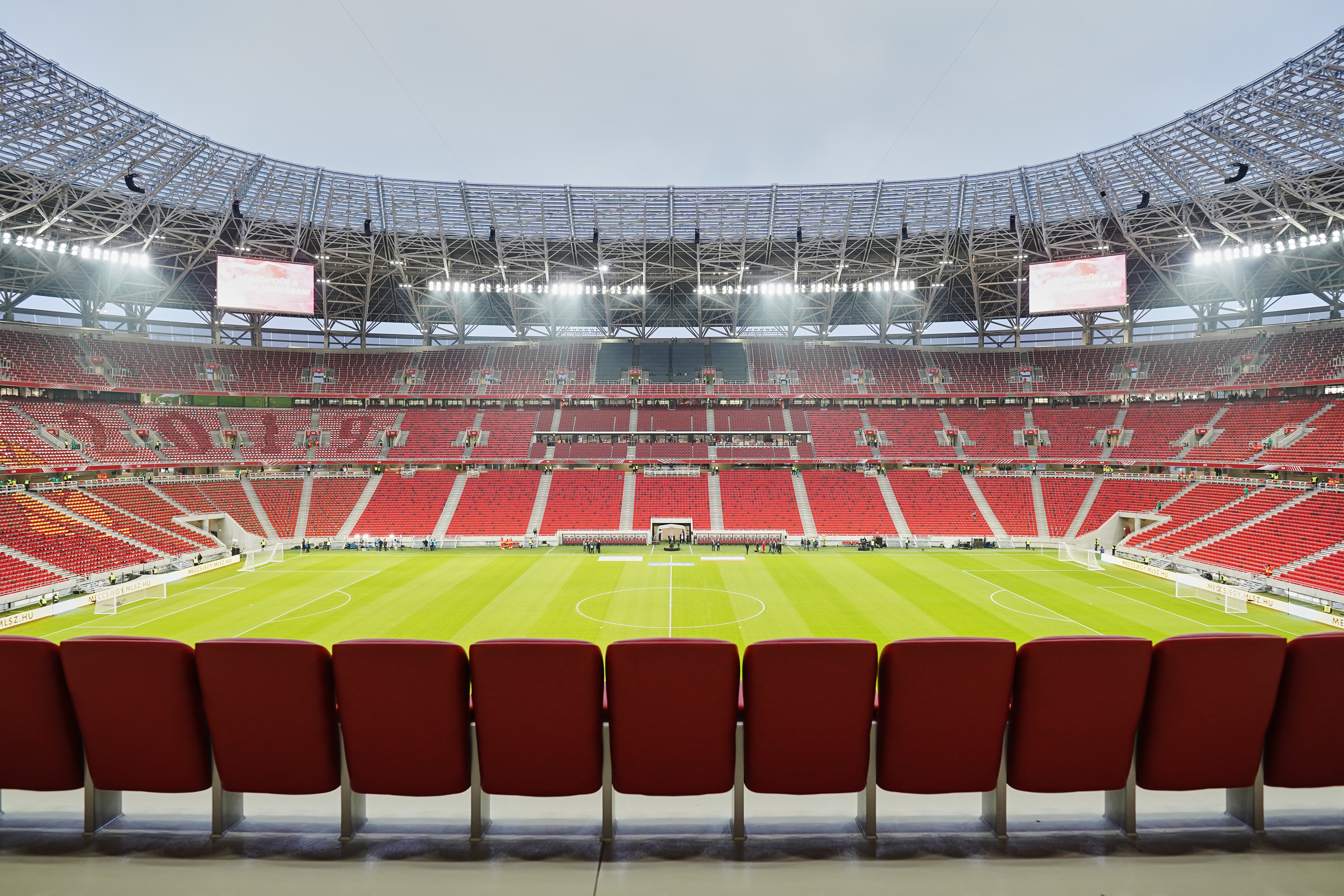
Interior of the Puskás Aréna

The home stadium of the Hungary national side is the Puskás Aréna. Formerly, it was the Ferenc Puskás Stadium (also called the Népstadion). The stadium was built between 1948 and 1953 using a large number of volunteers, including soldiers. On 23 May 1954, England lost to 7–1 against Hungary. The capacity of the stadium at the end was 35,100 (approved by UEFA) though its original capacity exceeded 100,000. The stadium also hosted one of the Derbies of Budapest, including Ferencváros, Újpest, MTK, Honvéd or Vasas. The national team's final match played at the stadium was a 3–0 win for Hungary against Kazakhstan on 7 June 2014.

On 19 September 2014, UEFA selected Budapest to host three group stage games and one round of 16 game at Euro 2020.

On 15 November 2019, the Puskás Aréna opened with a match against Uruguay. The idea to invite the Uruguay national football team came from Károly Jankovics, who is the leader of the Hungarian community in Montevideo.

Ferencváros' Groupama Arena was the temporary home of the national team between 2014 and 2019 during qualification for Euro 2016, the 2018 World Cup and Euro 2020.

== Results and fixtures ==
The following is a list of match results in the last 12 months, as well as any future matches that have been scheduled.

Win Draw Loss Fixture

=== 2026 ===
28 March Friendly	Hungary	1–0	Slovenia	Budapest, Hungary
18:00 UTC+1	Schön 79'	Report (UEFA)		Stadium: Puskás Aréna; Attendance: 50,252; Referee: Rohit Saggi (Norway)

31 March Friendly	Hungary	0–0	Greece	Budapest, Hungary
19:00 UTC+2		Report (UEFA)		Stadium: Puskás Aréna; Attendance: 54,849; Referee: Florian Badstübner (German)

5 June Friendly	Hungary	2–1	Finland	Budapest, Hungary
19:45 UTC+2	Varga 25', 43'	Report (UEFA)	T. Miettinen 71'	Stadium: Puskás Aréna; Attendance: 53,148; Referee: Ante Čulina (Croatia)

9 June Friendly	Hungary	3–1	Kazakhstan	Debrecen, Hungary
19:00 UTC+2	Szoboszlai 52'; Schäfer 67'; R. Tóth 90+3'	Report (UEFA)	Malyi 9'; Samorodov (yellow card) 28' (yellow-red card) 63'	Stadium: Nagyerdei Stadion; Attendance: 19,595; Referee: Pavle Ilić (Serbia)

25 September 2026–27 UEFA Nations League	Hungary	0–1	Ukraine	Budapest, Hungary
20:45 UTC+2		Report	Sikan 42'; Nazarenko (yellow card) 71' (yellow-red card) 90+2'	Stadium: Puskás Aréna; Attendance: 56,796; Referee: Jarred Gillett (England)

28 September 2026–27 UEFA Nations League	Northern Ireland	0–0	Hungary	Belfast, Northern Ireland
19:45 UTC+1		Report		Stadium: Windsor Park; Attendance: 18,082; Referee: Ricardo de Burgos Bengoetxea (Spain)

2 October 2026–27 UEFA Nations League	Hungary	1–0	Georgia	Budapest, Hungary
20:45 UTC+2	Kerkez 35'	Report		Stadium: Puskás Aréna; Attendance: 52,780; Referee: Srđan Jovanović (Serbia)

5 October 2026–27 UEFA Nations League	Ukraine	1–2	Hungary	Trnava, Slovakia (Note: Due to the Russian invasion of Ukraine, Ukraine are required to play their home matches at neutral venues until further notice.)
21:45 UTC+3	Yaremchuk 83'	Report	M. Tóth 52'; Csinger 85'	Stadium: Anton Malatinský Stadium; Attendance: 7,910; Referee: Igor Pajač (Croatia)

14 November 2026–27 UEFA Nations League	Georgia	0–2	Hungary	Tbilisi, Georgia
21:00 UTC+4		Report	Dvali 73' (o.g.); B. Varga 85'	Stadium: Mikheil Meskhi Stadium; Attendance: 19,187; Referee: Ondřej Berka (Czech Republic)

17 November 2026–27 UEFA Nations League	Hungary	1–1	Northern Ireland	Budapest, Hungary
20:45 UTC+1	B. Varga 35'	Report	Devenny 65'	Stadium: Puskás Aréna; Attendance: 55,306; Referee: Marco Guida (Italy)

== Coaching staff ==
Position	Name
Head coach	(Italy) Marco Rossi
Assistant Coaches	(Italy) Cosimo Inguscio (Hungary) Ádám Szalai
Goalkeeping Coach	(Hungary) István Kövesfalvi
Technical Manager	(Hungary) Attila Tömő
Fitness Coaches	(Hungary) Gábor Schuth (Hungary) Szabolcs Szusza
Doctor	(Hungary) Ádám Szilas
Chief Press Officer	(Hungary) Gergő Szabó
Masseur	(Hungary) Tamás Halmai
Kit Manager	(Hungary) László Hegyesi

== Players ==
=== Current squad ===
The following players were called up for the UEFA Nations League matches against Georgia on 14 November and Northern Ireland on 17 November 2026.

Caps and goals updated as of 17 November 2026, after the match against Northern Ireland.

No.	Pos.	Player	Date of birth (age)	Caps	Goals	Club
1	GK	Balázs Tóth	4 September 1997 (age 29)	13	0	(The Football Association) Blackburn Rovers
12	GK	Bence Gundel-Takács	6 April 1998 (age 28)	0	0	(Hungarian Football Federation) Zalaegerszeg
22	GK	Ármin Pécsi	24 February 2005 (age 21)	1	0	(Austrian Football Association) Hartberg
2	DF	Attila Osváth	10 December 1995 (age 30)	12	0	(Hungarian Football Federation) Ferencváros
3	DF	Márk Csinger	31 May 2003 (age 23)	7	1	(Royal Dutch Football Association) Groningen
4	DF	Attila Szalai	20 January 1998 (age 28)	53	2	(Polish Football Association) Pogoń Szczecin
5	DF	Ákos Markgráf	30 June 2005 (age 21)	2	0	(Danish Football Association) Copenhagen
6	DF	Kornél Szűcs	24 September 2001 (age 25)	2	0	(Football Association of Serbia) Vojvodina
11	DF	Milos Kerkez	7 November 2003 (age 23)	37	1	(The Football Association) Liverpool
14	DF	Bendegúz Bolla	22 November 1999 (age 26)	40	0	(Austrian Football Association) Rapid Wien
	DF	Willi Orbán	3 November 1992 (age 34)	73	6	(German Football Association) RB Leipzig
	DF	Zsolt Nagy	25 May 1993 (age 33)	41	3	(Hungarian Football Federation) Puskás Akadémia
7	MF	Milán Pető	25 January 2005 (age 21)	2	0	(Hungarian Football Federation) Paks
8	MF	Péter Baráth	21 February 2002 (age 24)	4	0	(Football Association of the Czech Republic) Sigma Olomouc
10	MF	Dominik Szoboszlai	25 October 2000 (age 26)	71	18	(The Football Association) Liverpool
13	MF	András Schäfer	13 April 1999 (age 27)	51	5	(German Football Association) Union Berlin
15	MF	Áron Csongvai	31 October 2000 (age 26)	7	0	(French Football Federation) Saint-Étienne
16	MF	Jozef Urblík	22 August 1996 (age 30)	1	0	(Hungarian Football Federation) Vasas
17	MF	Callum Styles	28 March 2000 (age 26)	32	0	(The Football Association) West Bromwich Albion
21	MF	Rajmund Tóth	9 April 2004 (age 22)	6	1	(Turkish Football Federation) Konyaspor
	MF	Milán Vitális	28 January 2002 (age 24)	13	0	(Hellenic Football Federation) AEK Athens
9	FW	Ákos Szendrei	23 January 2003 (age 23)	2	0	(Hungarian Football Federation) Debrecen
18	FW	Gábor Jurek	4 June 2004 (age 22)	4	0	(Hungarian Football Federation) MTK Budapest
19	FW	Barnabás Varga	25 October 1994 (age 32)	32	17	(Hellenic Football Federation) AEK Athens
20	FW	Roland Sallai	22 May 1997 (age 29)	68	15	(Turkish Football Federation) Galatasaray
23	FW	Damir Redzic	23 March 2003 (age 23)	6	0	(Austrian Football Association) Red Bull Salzburg

=== Recent call-ups ===
The following players have also been selected by Hungary in the past twelve months.

Pos.	Player	Date of birth (age)	Caps	Goals	Club	Latest call-up
GK	Áron Yaakobishvili	6 March 2006 (age 20)	1	0	(Spain) Almería	v. Kazakhstan, 9 June 2026
GK	Péter Szappanos	14 November 1990 (age 36)	3	0	(Hungary) Újpest	v. Kazakhstan, 9 June 2026
DF	Bence Várkonyi	18 March 2002 (age 24)	0	0	(Azerbaijan) Qarabağ	v. Georgia, 14 November 2026 ^{INJ}
DF	Áron Doktorics	21 November 2001 (age 24)	0	0	(Hungary) Vasas	v. Ukraine, 5 October 2026
DF	Márton Dárdai	12 February 2002 (age 24)	20	0	(Germany) Hertha BSC	v. Finland, 5 June 2026 ^{INJ}
DF	Loïc Négo	15 January 1991 (age 35)	48	2	(Cyprus) Omonia	v. Slovenia, 28 March 2026 ^{INJ}
DF	Botond Balogh	6 June 2002 (age 24)	8	0	(Belgium) Westerlo	v. Slovenia, 28 March 2026
MF	Alex Tóth	23 October 2005 (age 21)	16	0	(England) Bournemouth	v. Ukraine, 5 October 2026
MF	Tamás Szűcs	16 January 2005 (age 21)	8	0	(Portugal) Famalicão	v. Ukraine, 5 October 2026
MF	Norbert Szendrei	27 March 2000 (age 26)	0	0	(Hungary) Újpest	v. Kazakhstan, 9 June 2026
FW	Dániel Lukács	3 April 1996 (age 30)	13	2	(Hungary) Puskás Akadémia	v. Northern Ireland, 17 November 2026 ^{INJ}
FW	Donát Bárány	4 September 2000 (age 26)	5	0	(Netherlands) ADO Den Haag	v. Ukraine, 5 October 2026
FW	Milán Tóth	6 February 2002 (age 24)	4	1	(Hungary) Vasas	v. Ukraine, 5 October 2026
FW	József Szalai	11 November 2002 (age 24)	1	0	(Hungary) Paks	v. Ukraine, 5 October 2026
FW	Zsombor Gruber	7 September 2004 (age 22)	3	1	(Belgium) La Louvière	v. Kazakhstan, 9 June 2026
FW	Bendegúz Kovács	31 March 2007 (age 19)	2	0	(Netherlands) AZ Alkmaar	v. Kazakhstan, 9 June 2026
FW	Szabolcs Schön	27 September 2000 (age 26)	11	1	(Hungary) Győr	v. Finland, 5 June 2026 ^{INJ}
^{INJ} Injured player

== Player records ==
As of 11 October 2025

Players in bold are still active with Hungary.

=== Most appearances ===
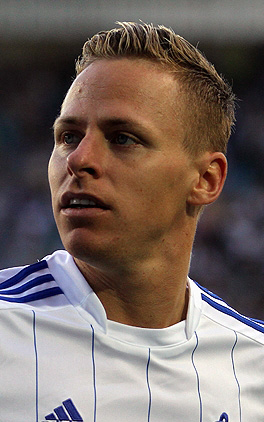
Balázs Dzsudzsák is Hungary's most capped player with 109 appearances.

Rank	Player	Caps	Goals	Career
1	Balázs Dzsudzsák	109	21	2007–2022
2	Gábor Király	108	0	1998–2016
3	József Bozsik	101	11	1947–1962
4	Zoltán Gera	97	26	2002–2017
5	Roland Juhász	95	6	2004–2016
6	László Fazekas	92	20	1968–1983
7	Ádám Nagy	88	2	2015–2024
8	Gyula Grosics	86	0	1947–1962
8	Ádám Szalai	86	26	2009–2022
10	Ferenc Puskás	85	84	1945–1956

=== Top goalscorers ===
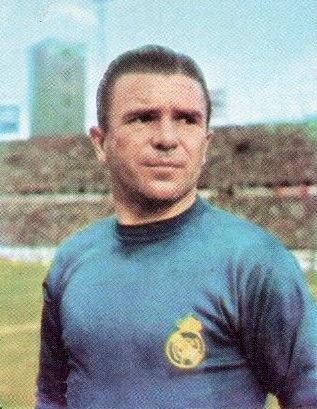
Ferenc Puskás is Hungary's all-time top scorer with 84 goals.

Rank	Player	Goals	Caps	Ratio	Career
1	Ferenc Puskás (list)	84	85	0.99	1945–1956
2	Sándor Kocsis (list)	75	68	1.1	1948–1956
3	Imre Schlosser (list)	59	68	0.87	1906–1927
4	Lajos Tichy	51	72	0.71	1955–1971
5	György Sárosi	42	62	0.68	1931–1943
6	Nándor Hidegkuti	39	69	0.57	1945–1958
7	Ferenc Bene	36	76	0.47	1962–1979
8	Gyula Zsengellér	32	39	0.82	1936–1947
8	Tibor Nyilasi	32	70	0.46	1975–1985
10	Flórián Albert	31	74	0.42	1959–1974

=== Captains ===
Name	Captained	Major tournament as captain
Tibor Nyilasi	1981–1985	1982 FIFA World Cup
Antal Nagy	1985–1986	1986 FIFA World Cup
Imre Garaba	1986–1991	
Lajos Détári	1991–1994	
István Kozma	1995	
János Bánfi	1996–1997	
Béla Illés	1998–2001	
Gábor Király	2002–2003	
Zoltán Gera	2004–2005	
Pál Dárdai	2006	
Zoltán Gera	2007–2013	
Balázs Dzsudzsák	2014–2019	UEFA Euro 2016
Ádám Szalai	2020–2022	UEFA Euro 2020
**Dominik Szoboszlai**	2022–	UEFA Euro 2024

== Competitive record ==
=== FIFA World Cup ===
Champions Runners-up Third place

FIFA World Cup record										Qualification record						
Year	Round	Position	Pld	W	D	L	GF	GA	Squad	Position	Pld	W	D	L	GF	GA
(Uruguay) 1930	Did not enter									Did not enter						
(Italy) 1934	Quarter-finals	6th	2	1	0	1	5	4	Squad	1st	2	2	0	0	8	2
(France) 1938	Runners-up	2nd	4	3	0	1	15	5	Squad	1st	1	1	0	0	11	1
(Brazil) 1950	Did not enter									Did not enter						
(Switzerland) 1954	Runners-up	2nd	5	4	0	1	27	10	Squad	Qualified by default						
(Sweden) 1958	Group stage	10th	4	1	1	2	7	5	Squad	1st	4	3	0	1	12	4
(Chile) 1962	Quarter-finals	5th	4	2	1	1	8	3	Squad	1st	4	3	1	0	11	5
(England) 1966	Quarter-finals	6th	4	2	0	2	8	7	Squad	1st	4	3	1	0	8	3
(Mexico) 1970	Did not qualify									P/O	7	4	1	2	17	11
(West Germany) 1974	Did not qualify									3rd	6	2	4	0	12	7
(Argentina) 1978	Group stage	15th	3	0	0	3	3	8	Squad	P/O	6	4	1	1	15	6
(Spain) 1982	Group stage	14th	3	1	1	1	12	6	Squad	1st	8	4	2	2	13	8
(Mexico) 1986	Group stage	18th	3	1	0	2	2	9	Squad	1st	6	5	0	1	12	4
(Italy) 1990	Did not qualify									3rd	8	2	4	2	8	12
(United States) 1994	Did not qualify									4th	8	2	1	5	6	11
(France) 1998	Did not qualify									P/O	10	3	3	4	11	20
(South Korea) (Japan) 2002	Did not qualify									4th	8	2	2	4	14	13
(Germany) 2006	Did not qualify									4th	10	4	2	4	13	14
(South Africa) 2010	Did not qualify									4th	10	5	1	4	10	8
(Brazil) 2014	Did not qualify									3rd	10	5	2	3	21	20
(Russia) 2018	Did not qualify									3rd	10	4	1	5	14	14
(Qatar) 2022	Did not qualify									4th	10	5	2	3	19	13
(Canada) (Mexico) (United States) 2026	Did not qualify									3rd	6	2	2	2	11	10
(Morocco) (Portugal) (Spain) 2030	To be determined									To be determined						
(Saudi Arabia) 2034	To be determined									To be determined						
Total	Runners-up	9/23	32	15	3	14	87	57	—	Total	138	65	30	43	246	186

=== UEFA European Championship ===
Champions Runners-up Third place

UEFA European Championship record										Qualification record						
Year	Round	Position	Pld	W	D	L	GF	GA	Squad	Position	Pld	W	D	L	GF	GA
(France) 1960	Did not qualify									FR	2	0	0	2	1	4
(Spain) 1964	Third place	3rd	2	1	0	1	4	3	Squad	QF	6	4	2	0	14	8
(Italy) 1968	Did not qualify									QF	8	5	1	2	17	8
(Belgium) 1972	Fourth place	4th	2	0	0	2	1	3	Squad	QF	9	5	3	1	17	9
(Socialist Federal Republic of Yugoslavia) 1976	Did not qualify									2nd	6	3	1	2	15	8
(Italy) 1980	Did not qualify									2nd	6	2	2	2	9	9
(France) 1984	Did not qualify									4th	8	3	1	4	18	17
(West Germany) 1988	Did not qualify									3rd	8	4	0	4	13	11
(Sweden) 1992	Did not qualify									4th	8	2	4	2	10	9
(England) 1996	Did not qualify									4th	8	2	2	4	7	13
(Belgium) (Netherlands) 2000	Did not qualify									4th	10	3	3	4	14	10
(Portugal) 2004	Did not qualify									4th	8	3	2	3	15	9
(Austria) (Switzerland) 2008	Did not qualify									6th	12	4	0	8	11	22
(Poland) (Ukraine) 2012	Did not qualify									3rd	10	6	1	3	22	14
(France) 2016	Round of 16	13th	4	1	2	1	6	8	Squad	3rd (PO winners)	12	6	4	2	14	10
(Europe) 2020	Group stage	20th	3	0	2	1	3	6	Squad	4th (PO winners)	10	6	0	4	13	13
(Germany) 2024	Group stage	18th	3	1	0	2	2	5	Squad	1st	8	5	3	0	16	7
(England) (Scotland) (Wales) (Republic of Ireland) 2028	To be determined									To be determined						
(Italy) (Turkey) 2032	To be determined									To be determined						
Total	Third place	5/17	14	3	4	7	16	25	—	Total	139	63	29	47	226	181

=== UEFA Nations League ===
Champions Runners-up Third place

UEFA Nations League record
Season	Division	Group	Round	Pos	Pld	W	D	L	GF	GA	RK	P/R
2018–19	C	2	Group stage	2nd	6	3	1	2	9	6	31nd	▲
2020–21	B	3	Group stage	1st	6	3	2	1	7	4	20th	▲
2022–23	A	3	Group stage	2nd	6	3	1	2	8	5	8th	Same position
2024–25	A	3	Group stage	3rd	6	1	3	2	4	11	18th	▼
2024–25	A	Relegation play-off		Losers	2	0	0	2	1	6	18th	▼
2026–27	B	2	Group stage	2nd	6	3	2	1	6	3	23rd	TBD
2026–27	B	Promotion play-off		TBD	0	0	0	0	0	0	23rd	TBD
Total			Group stage	5/5	32	13	9	10	35	35	8th	

=== Olympic Games ===
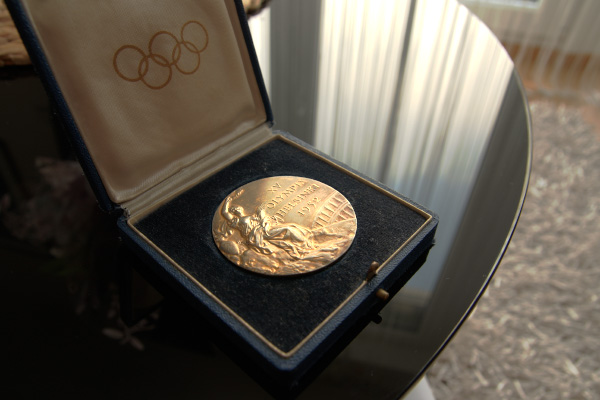
The gold medal of the 1952 Olympic Games held in Helsinki

The first three Olympic football events were only unofficial tournament, with a few nations represented by a club team. Beginning in 1908, the Olympic football tournament became an official event.

After 1988, the football event was changed into an under-23-only tournament.

Champions Runners-up Third place

Olympic Games record
Year	Host	Round	Position	Pld	W	D	L	GF	GA	Squad
1896	Greece	No football tournament								
1900	France	Did not enter								
1904	United States	Did not enter								
1908	United Kingdom	Withdrew								
1912	Sweden	Round 2	10th	1	0	0	1	0	7	Squad
1920	Belgium	Did not enter								
1924	France	Round 2	9th	2	1	0	1	5	3	Squad
1928	Netherlands	Did not enter								
1932	United States	No football tournament								
1936	Nazi Germany	Round 1	13th	1	0	0	1	0	3	Squad
1948	United Kingdom	Did not enter								
1952	Finland	Champions	1st	6	6	0	0	20	2	Squad
1956	Australia	Did not enter								
1960	Italy	Third place	3rd	5	4	0	1	17	9	Squad
1964	Japan	Champions	1st	5	5	0	0	22	6	Squad
1968	Mexico	Champions	1st	5	5	1	0	18	3	Squad
1972	West Germany	Runners-up	2nd	7	5	1	1	21	5	Squad
1976	Canada	Did not qualify								
1980	Soviet Union	Did not qualify								
1984	United States	Withdrew								
1988	South Korea	Did not qualify								
Since 1992		See Hungary national under-21 football team								
Total		3 Titles	8/19	32	26	2	5	103	38	—

== Team records ==
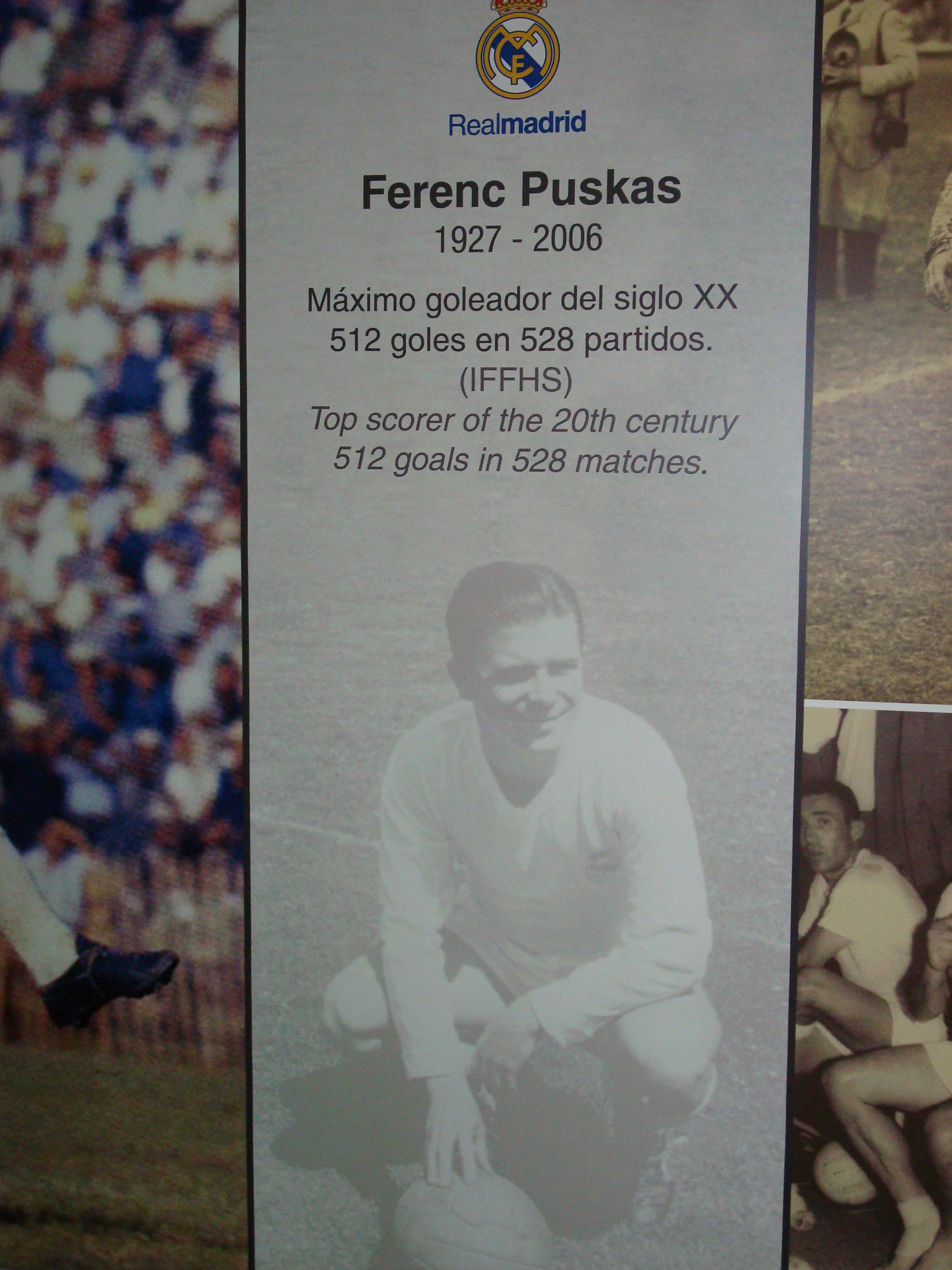
Puskás, top scorer of the 20th century

The match between Austria and Hungary in Vienna in 1902 was the first international match played between two non-British European countries.

Hungary was the first team from outside the United Kingdom and Ireland to beat England at home, famously winning 6–3 at Wembley on 25 November 1953. Six months later they beat England 7–1 in 1954, this time in Budapest. This still ranks as England's record defeat.

Gusztáv Sebes holds the highest ratio of victories per game (over 30 matches only) with 72% (49 wins, 12, draws, 7 defeats).

Hungary has the distinction of setting the highest Elo football rating ever achieved by a national side, a high of 2230 in 1954. It was set after Hungary's 4–2 victory over Uruguay in the 1954 World Cup semi-finals on 30 June 1954, the final match in their 31-game unbeaten streak (see below). Germany and England come in second (2223 in 2014) and third (2212 in 1928) respectively.

The youngest-ever player of the Hungarian national team, József Horváth, is the second youngest scorer of European national teams according the IFFHS.

Ferenc Puskás is recognized to be the top scorer of the 20th century, by the IFFHS.

=== Top international goalscorers of the 20th century ===
Two of the top six international goalscorers of the 20th century were Hungarian, both of them from the Golden Team of the 1950s.

#	Player	Nation	Goals scored	Games played	Years active
1.	Ferenc Puskás	Hungary	84 goals	85 internationals	1945–1956
2.	Kunishige Kamamoto	Japan	80 goals	84 internationals	1964–1977
3.	Pelé	Brazil	77 goals	91 internationals	1957–1971
4.	Sándor Kocsis	Hungary	75 goals	68 internationals	1948–1956
5.	Majed Abdullah	Saudi Arabia	71 goals	116 internationals	1978–1994
6.	Gerd Müller	West Germany	68 goals	62 internationals	1966–1974

=== Undefeated run ===
Hungary was the first team to eclipse an 1888 Scottish record of being undefeated in 22 consecutive matches. They bettered the old mark by nine additional games to 31, now the third-longest unbeaten streak, going undefeated from 14 May 1950 to 4 July 1954, when they lost the World Cup final to West Germany.

Italy holds the longest string at 37 unbeaten matches.

* = not official

Opponent	Type	Date	Result
Poland	Exhibition game	4 June 1950	5–2
Albania	Exhibition game	24 September 1950	12–0
Austria	Exhibition game	29 October 1950	4–3
Bulgaria	Exhibition game	12 November 1950	1–1
Poland	Exhibition game	27 May 1951	6–0
Czechoslovakia	Exhibition game	14 October 1951	2–1
Finland	Exhibition game	18 November 1951	8–0
East Germany	Exhibition game	18 May 1952	5–0*
Poland	Exhibition game	15 June 1952	5–1
Finland	Exhibition game	22 June 1952	6–1
Romania	1952 Olympics	15 July 1952	2–1
Italy	1952 Olympics	21 July 1952	3–0
Turkey	1952 Olympics	24 July 1952	7–1
Sweden	1952 Olympics	28 July 1952	6–0
Yugoslavia	1952 Olympics	2 August 1952	2–0
Switzerland	Central European Cup	20 September 1952	4–2
Czechoslovakia	Exhibition game	19 October 1952	5–0
Austria	Exhibition game	26 April 1953	1–1
Italy	Central European Cup	17 May 1953	3–0
Sweden	Exhibition game	5 July 1953	4–2
Bulgaria	Exhibition game	4 October 1953	1–1
Czechoslovakia	Exhibition game	4 October 1953	5–1
Austria	Exhibition game	11 October 1953	3–2
Sweden	Exhibition game	15 November 1953	2–2
England	Exhibition game	25 November 1953	6–3
Egypt	Exhibition game	12 February 1954	3–0
Austria	Exhibition game	11 April 1954	1–0
England	Exhibition game	23 May 1954	7–1
South Korea	1954 FIFA World Cup	17 June 1954	9–0
West Germany	1954 FIFA World Cup	20 June 1954	8–3
Brazil	1954 FIFA World Cup	27 June 1954	4–2
Uruguay	1954 FIFA World Cup	30 June 1954	4–2 (a.e.t.)

=== Record defeat against Hungary ===
A total of 10 countries have suffered their biggest ever defeat against the Hungarian national football team. Of these teams, 6 are members of UEFA, 3 of CAF and one of CONCACAF. The win against El Salvador is the biggest scoreline in men's FIFA World Cup final history.

29 October 1911 Friendly	Hungary	9–0	Switzerland	Budapest, Hungary
15:00 (UTC+1:00)	Bíró 1'; Koródy 5', 26'; Schlosser 18', 56', 62', 79', 83', 85'	Report		Stadium: Millenáris Sporttelep; Attendance: 15,000; Referee: Hugo Meisl (Austria)
Note: Imre Schlosser set the goal scoring record for Hungary (23 goals). This match was also the biggest victory of the Hungary football team at the time.

6 April 1924 Friendly	Hungary	7–1	Italy	Budapest, Hungary
16:30 (UTC+1:00)	Braun 17', 42' (pen.); Eisenhoffer 49'; Molnár 59', 60', 69'; Opata 70'	Report	Cevenini 76' (pen.)	Stadium: Hungária körúti stadion Attendance: 35,000; Referee: Max Seemann (Austria)

25 March 1938 1938 FIFA World Cup qualification	Hungary	11–1	Greece	Budapest, Hungary
	Zsengellér 14', 23' (pen.), 24', 65', 81', 83'; Titkos 17', 65'; Vincze 26'; Nemes 36', 40', 51'	Report	Makris 89'	Stadium: Hungária körúti stadion Attendance: 12,000; Referee: Denis Xifando (Romania)

6 June 1948 1948 Balkan Cup	Hungary	9–0	Romania	Budapest, Hungary
	Mészáros 30', 46'; Egresi 43', 61', 72'; Puskás 58', 82'; Kocsis 67', 85'	Report		Stadium: Megyeri úti Stadion; Attendance: 45,000; Referee: Antun Mlinarić (Yugoslavia)

24 September 1950 Friendly	Hungary	12–0	Albania	Budapest, Hungary
15:30	Puskás 18', 36', 75', 82'; Budai 33', 52', 60', 65'; Palotás 39', 50'; Kocsis 42', 53'			Stadium: Megyeri úti Stadion; Attendance: 38,000; Referee: Nemčovský Josef (Czechoslovakia)

23 May 1954 Friendly	Hungary	7–1	England	Budapest, Hungary
	Lantos 10'; Puskás 17', 71'; Kocsis 19', 57'; Hidegkuti 59'; Tóth 63'		Broadis 68'	Stadium: Népstadion; Attendance: 92,000; Referee: Giorgio Bernardi (Italy)

24 July 1960 Friendly	Hungary	10–1	Tunisia	Budapest, Hungary
	Albert 6', 70', 81', 88'; Göröcs 17', 40'; Solymosi 32'; Pál 38'; Kuharszki 49', 76'			Stadium: Népstadion; Attendance: 25,000; Referee: József Pósfai (Hungary)

11 October 1964 1964 Olympics	Hungary	6–0	Morocco	Tokyo, Japan
14:00	Bene 13', 38' (pen.), 70', 74', 78', 87'	Report		Stadium: National Olympic Stadium; Attendance: 65,793; Referee: Kim Duk-chun (South Korea)

15 June 1982 1982 World Cup	Hungary	10–1	El Salvador	Elche, Spain
21:00 CEST	Nyilasi 4', 83'; Pölöskei 11'; Fazekas 23', 54'; Tóth 50'; L. Kiss 69', 72', 76'; Szentes 70'	Report	Ramírez Zapata 64'	Stadium: Nuevo Estadio; Attendance: 23,000; Referee: Ibrahim Youssef Al-Doy (Bahrain)

== All-time team record ==
The following table shows Hungary's all-time international record, correct as of 17 November 2026.

Against	Played	Won	Drawn	Lost	GF	GA	GD
Total	1019	480	223	316	2028	1488	+540

=== Head-to-head record ===
The following table shows Hungary's all-time international record. Updated 17 November 2026, after the match against Northern Ireland.

Positive Record Neutral Record Negative Record

Against	Played	Won	Drawn	Lost	GF	GA	GD
Albania	8	5	1	2	19	2	+17
Algeria	1	1	0	0	3	1	+2
Andorra	6	5	0	1	17	3	+14
Antigua and Barbuda	1	1	0	0	3	0	+3
Argentina	7	1	1	5	6	15	−9
Armenia	3	3	0	0	5	0	+5
Australia	3	0	0	3	2	8	−6
Austria	137	67	30	40	299	252	+47
Azerbaijan	8	8	0	0	21	3	+18
Belarus	3	0	2	1	4	7	−3
Belgium	13	2	2	9	16	31	−15
Bohemia	5	2	2	1	18	14	+4
Bolivia	2	2	0	0	9	2	+7
Bosnia and Herzegovina	6	3	3	0	8	3	+5
Brazil	6	3	1	2	14	12	+2
Bulgaria	25	14	6	5	60	27	+33
Canada	2	2	0	0	3	0	+3
Chile	3	1	1	1	6	9	−3
China	1	0	0	1	1	2	−1
Colombia	1	1	0	0	3	1	+2
Costa Rica	1	1	0	0	1	0	+1
Croatia	12	2	6	4	10	19	−9
Cyprus	8	7	0	1	14	5	+9
Czech Republic	10	4	4	2	24	20	+4
Czechoslovakia	39	20	10	9	85	60	+15
Denmark	16	9	4	3	40	16	+24
East Germany	17	9	4	4	30	17	+13
El Salvador	2	1	1	0	11	2	+9
Egypt	4	2	1	1	9	5	+4
England	26	7	3	16	36	61	−25
Estonia	7	5	1	1	17	5	+12
Faroe Islands	4	3	1	0	4	1	+3
Finland	19	13	3	3	49	13	+36
France	23	12	3	8	48	32	+16
Georgia	4	3	0	1	8	4	+4
Germany (Note: Includes matches against West Germany and East Germany)	57	21	17	19	99	99	0
Greece	23	6	7	10	37	33	+4
Iceland	12	8	1	3	24	12	+12
India	1	1	0	0	2	1	+1
Iran	4	4	0	0	11	1	+10
Israel	6	2	2	2	6	5	+1
Italy	36	9	9	18	57	67	−10
Ivory Coast	1	0	1	0	0	0	0
Japan	2	2	0	0	4	2	+2
Jordan	1	0	1	0	1	1	0
Kazakhstan	3	2	0	1	8	4	+4
Kosovo	1	1	0	0	2	0	+2
Kuwait	1	1	0	0	1	0	+1
Latvia	7	6	0	1	16	7	+9
Lebanon	1	1	0	0	4	1	+3
Liechtenstein	3	2	1	0	10	0	+10
Lithuania	7	5	2	0	18	4	+14
Luxembourg	12	10	1	1	50	14	+36
Malta	12	9	2	1	28	6	+22
Mexico	7	1	1	5	6	15	−9
Moldova	7	4	2	1	10	6	+4
Montenegro	5	1	2	2	7	8	−1
Netherlands	19	5	3	11	30	58	−26
New Zealand	3	3	0	0	6	2	+4
North Macedonia	3	2	1	0	6	0	+6
Northern Ireland	9	5	3	1	10	5	+5
Norway	19	9	5	5	35	20	+15
Peru	2	0	0	2	3	5	−2
Poland	34	21	5	8	92	43	+49
Portugal	16	0	5	11	14	38	−24
Qatar	3	2	1	0	8	2	+6
Republic of Ireland	16	5	7	4	30	25	+5
Romania	26	11	8	7	48	32	+16
Russia (Note: Includes matches against the Soviet Union)	31	6	9	16	47	52	−5
San Marino	6	6	0	0	26	0	+26
Saudi Arabia	2	0	2	0	2	2	0
Scotland	9	4	2	3	18	14	+4
Serbia (Note: Includes matches against Yugoslavia)	37	18	10	9	64	58	+6
Slovakia	6	0	2	4	2	7	−5
Slovenia	5	2	0	3	4	5	−1
South Korea	2	2	0	0	10	0	+10
Spain	13	3	5	5	18	21	−3
Sweden	46	18	10	18	90	80	+10
Switzerland	47	30	5	12	132	69	+63
Turkey	18	10	2	6	37	22	+15
Ukraine	4	3	0	1	7	4	+3
United Arab Emirates	2	2	0	0	6	1	+5
United States	3	1	1	1	2	2	0
Uruguay	4	1	2	1	7	6	+1
Wales	12	4	2	6	15	17	−2
Total	1018	480	222	316	2,027	1,487	+540

== FIFA ranking ==
Last updated on 19 December 2024

Key to FIFA World Ranking table
Highest position
Lowest position

Year	Jan	Febr.	Mar.	Apr.	May	Jun.	Jul.	Aug.	Sep.	Oct.	Nov.	Dec.
1992	–	–	–	–	–	–	–	–	–	–	–	36. (–)
1993	–	–	–	–	–	–	–	42. (36)	48. (34)	49. (33)	50. (34)	50. (34)
1994	50. (34)	49. (34)	52. (32)	53. (32)	49. (33)	56. (30)	55 (31.)	55 (31.)	54. (32)	52. (32)	59. (31)	61. (31)
1995	61. (31)	63. (30)	63. (30)	57. (32)	53. (35)	54. (35)	55. (35)	61. (30)	54. (32)	65. (32)	60. (33)	62. (33)
1996	64. (33)	66. (33)	66. (33)	74. (29)	82. (26)	82. (26)	87. (26)	81. (29)	74. (32)	78. (32)	72. (34)	75. (34)
1997	75. (34)	76. (34)	76. (34)	72. (35)	74. (35)	71. (38)	71. (38)	72. (38)	71. (38)	68. (40)	78. (37)	77. (37)
1998	77. (37)	84. (36)	82. (36)	73. (37)	62. (41)	62. ()	56. (42)	60. (41)	59. (41)	49. (44)	45. (46)	46. (47)
1999	45. (533)^{1}	46. (531)	47. (528)	45. (540)	44. (540)	46. (532)	48. (531)	50. (530)	43. (547)	46. (538)	47. (536)	45. (533)
2000	46. (533)	50. (532)	50. (530)	53. (526)	54. (524)	53. (523)	50. (529)	53. (528)	49. (540)	53. (532)	48. (555)	47. (556)
2001	48. (556)	49. (554)	47. (560)	48. (559)	53. (551)	53. (561)	54. (559)	54. (557)	64. (540)	67. (532)	64. (540)	66. (537)
2002	67. (537)	68. (535)	68. (531)	68. (528)	68. (523)	68. (523)	67. (511)	71. (499)	64. (517)	54. (546)	58. (533)	56. (533)
2003	58. (532)	56. (538)	56. (535)	58. (534)	54. (544)	49. (570)	48. (568)	48. (564)	52. (549)	67. (525)	67. (524)	72. (517)
2004	72. (516)	74. (514)	67. (531)	72. (519)	68. (522)	74. (519)	78. (514)	77. (514)	76. (523)	68. (540)	74. (539)	64. (562)
2005	63. (562)	65. (561)	69. (556)	69. (556)	69. (552)	65. (561)	66. (559)	65. (557)	66. (557)	66. (562)	71. (551)	74. (547)
2006	70. (552)	72. (550)	72. (548)	75. (538)	76. (535)	76. (535)	84. (383)^{2}	80. (383)	59. (484)	76. (437)	67. (466)	62. (483)
2007	61. (494)	64. (474)	64. (474)	58. (518)	57. (521)	66. (461)	65. (461)	65. (464)	55. (544)	48. (630)	52. (581)	50. (588)
2008	50. (594)	52. (598)	51. (594)	56. (546)	57. (546)	52. (580)	52. (591)	50. (591)	50. (561)	62. (507)	56. (551)	47. (603)
2009	47. (606)	43. (629)	48. (596)	44. (662)	43. (662)	43. (687)	44. (681)	43. (681)	47. (669)	50. (645)	55. (603)	54. (613)
2010	52. (615)	48. (645)	52. (589)	56. (567)	57. (565)	57. (565)	62. (534)	62. (534)	51. (567)	44. (598)	43. (615)	42. (632)
2011	41. (632)	37. (632)	36. (654)	52. (559)	52. (559)	45. (603)	47. (603)	45. (613)	27. (754)	36. (701)	37. (665)	37. (665)
2012	37. (665)	37. (678)	37. (658)	36. (692)	35. (692)	31. (735)	31. (716)	28. (746)	37. (663)	49. (593)	30. (753)	32. (750)
2013	32. (750)	33. (728)	32. (752)	33. (749)	33. (749)	33. (759)	32. (749)	30. (746)	30. (744)	43. (636)	44. (668)	44. (668)
2014	46. (668)	44. (673)	43. (652)	44. (623)	45. (623)	47. (624)	38. (642)	34. (656)	54. (548)	50. (561)	44. (632)	45. (632)
2015	45. (632)	48. (634)	46. (659)	43. (665)	43. (665)	42. (685)	31. (763)	35. (763)	37. (740)	33. (741)	33. (759)	20. (945)
2016	20. (945)	19. (945)	19. (945)	18. (925)	18. (925)	20. (886)	19. (915)	19. (915)	20. (913)	22. (891)	26. (826)	26. (826)
2017	26. (826)	27. (830)	27. (834)	31. (801)	31. (801)	33. (802)	57. (616)	56. (616)	59. (629)	53. (642)	53. (630)	53. (630)
2018	54. (630)	49. (630)	50. (637)	50. (604)	49. (604)	51. (612)	51. (612)	51. (1409)^{3}	49. (1409)	55. (1400)	51. (1412)	51. (1412)
2019	51. (1412)	52. (1412)	52. (1412)	51. (1419)	51. (1419)	42. (1442)	45. (1442)	45. (1442)	50. (1429)	50. (1429)	52. (1416)	52. (1416)
2020	52. (1416)	52. (1416)	52. (1416)	52. (1416)	52. (1416)	52. (1416)	52. (1416)	52. (1418)	47. (1439)	40. (1460)	40. (1460)	40. (1460)
2021	40. (1460)	40. (1460)	37. (1469)	37. (1469)	37. (1469)	37. (1469)	37. (1469)	37. (1474)	40. (1457)	43. (1450)	39. (1465)	39. (1466)
2022	39. (1466)	41. (1466)	40. (1466)	40. (1466)	40. (1466)	37. (1487)	37. (1487)	37. (1487)	37. (1487)	36. (1492)	36. (1492)	36. (1493)
2023	36. (1493)	36. (1493)	36. (1493)	33. (1504)	33. (1504)	36. (1505)	36. (1505)	36. (1505)	32. (1518)	30. (1522)	27. (1525)	27. (1525)
2024	27. (1525)	27. (1525)	27. (1525)	26. (1532)	26. (1532)	27. (1529)	31. (1518)	31. (1518)	32. (1511)	32. (1519)	30. (1517)	30. (1517)
2025	30. (1517)											

Notes

- Note 1: in January 1999 FIFA changed the system of the ranking calculation
- Note 2: in July 2006 FIFA changed the system of the ranking calculation
- Note 3: in August 2018 FIFA changed the system of the ranking calculation

== Honours ==
=== Global ===
- FIFA World Cup
  - (silver) Runners-up: 1938, 1954
- Olympic Games
  - (gold) Champions: 1952, 1964, 1968
  - (silver) Runners-up: 1972
  - (bronze) Third place: 1960

=== Continental ===
- UEFA European Championship
  - (bronze) Third place: 1964

=== Regional ===
- Central European International Cup
  - (gold) Champions: 1948–53
  - (silver) Runners-up: 1955–60
  - (bronze) Third place: 1931–32, 1933–35
- Balkan Cup
  - (gold) Champions: 1947

=== Summary ===
Competition	1st place, gold medalist(s)	2nd place, silver medalist(s)	3rd place, bronze medalist(s)	Total
FIFA World Cup	0	2	0	2
UEFA European Championship	0	0	1	1
Olympic Games	3	1	1	5
Total	3	3	2	8

== See also ==
- Austria–Hungary football rivalry
- Hungary-Romania football rivalry
- Hungary men's national under-21 football team
- Hungary men's national under-19 football team
- Hungary men's national under-17 football team
- Hungary women's national football team
