= G. Edward Dwyer Jr. =

American judge

Administrative Judge for the Circuit Court for Frederick County
- In office 1991 – March 1, 2016
- Succeeded by: Julie Stevenson Solt

Associate Judge for the Circuit Court for Frederick County
- In office May 6, 1985 – 1991
- Appointed by: Governor Harry Hughes

Personal details
- Born: March 20, 1946 (age 80) Baltimore, Maryland United States
- Education: Loyola College, B.A. (1968); University of Maryland School of Law, J.D. (1971)
- Occupation: Lawyer

G. Edward Dwyer Jr. (born March 20, 1946) is an American lawyer and was the Administrative Judge of the Circuit Court for Frederick County from 1991 until his retirement in 2016.

== Early life and education ==
Dwyer was born in Baltimore, Maryland. He attended Loyola College, where he received a bachelor of arts in 1968. Following his undergraduate education, Dwyer attended the University of Maryland School of Law and received a juris doctor in 1971.

== Career ==
Dwyer was admitted to the Maryland bar in 1972 and served on the Maryland State Bar Association's Committee on Laws. Dwyer started his career as a trial worker, working on criminal cases and workers' compensation cases. Dwyer also joined the Frederick County Bar Association in Frederick, Maryland, and is a member of the Maryland Trial Lawyers Association.

Dwyer was appointed to the Circuit Court for Frederick County in May 1985 by Maryland Governor Harry Hughes. He was the acting Administrative Judge until 1991, when he became the Administrative Judge for the court. In 2001, Dwyer co-founded the Court Appointed Special Advocates for the Children of Frederick County. In 2013, Dwyer received the Lifetime Achievement Award from the Maryland State Bar Association. Dwyer retired on March 1, 2016, after reaching the age of retirement in Maryland. He was succeeded by Julie Stevenson Solt.

== Personal life ==
Dwyer resides in Grasonville, Maryland. He has four children and eleven grandchildren.
