= Hungary–Poland football rivalry =

Association football rivalry

- Location: Europe (UEFA)
- Teams: Hungary; Poland
- First meeting: Hungary 1–0 Poland; Friendly; Budapest (18 December 1921)
- Latest meeting: Poland 1–2 Hungary; 2022 FIFA World Cup qualification (UEFA); Warsaw (15 November 2021)

Statistics
- Total meetings: 34
- Most wins: Hungary (21)
- Largest victory: Hungary 8–2 Poland; Friendly; Debrecen (10 Jul 1949)

The Hungary–Poland football rivalry is a competitive sports rivalry that exists between the national football teams of the two countries.

The first official match between the two teams dates back to 1921.

There is a friendly relationsip between these teams and their fans.

== Background ==
Hungary

Poland

Both countries have been friends since the Middle Ages. Relations between the two nations strengthened in the 14th century, when a personal union was concluded, resulting in the inauguration of the then Hungarian ruler, Louis I, known in Hungarian historiography as the Great, as King of Poland in 1370. He reigned in both kingdoms until his death in 1382. In Poland, his younger daughter, Jadwiga, succeeded him to the throne, while his elder daughter, Mary, ascended to the Hungarian throne.

The Hungarian Revolution of 1848–1849 was supported by the Polish national government in exile. A 3,000-strong Polish Legion under the command of General Józef Wysocki fought on the Hungarian side. One of the more famous participants in this uprising was Edmund Śląski. Józef Bem, the commander-in-chief of the Hungarian uprising of 1848–1849, is considered a Hungarian national hero.

During the Polish-Soviet War (1919-1921), Hungary was the only country in the region to offer military aid to Poland, which was being attacked by the Bolsheviks, in the form of 30,000 cavalrymen. In early July 1920, the Hungarian government of Prime Minister Pál Teleki decided to provide aid to Poland, providing military supplies free of charge and at its own expense via Romania at a critical moment in the war. The emotional bond between the nations was not broken even during World War II. Hungary was an ally of the Third Reich, whose forces attacked Poland during the September Campaign. Hungarian Prime Minister Pál Teleki categorically denied Adolf Hitler the right to invade Poland from Hungarian territory. After the German invasion, over one hundred thousand Polish refugees found shelter in Hungary, and schools for Polish children were opened.

During the Hungarian Revolution of 1956, Poles donated and sent blood there.

== History ==
Matches between the Polish and Hungarian national teams have generated great excitement for many years. The first match between the teams, considered the first official match of the Polish national team, took place on December 18, 1921, at the Hungária Körúti Stadium in Budapest, ending in a 1–0 victory for the Hungarian team. Hungary was also the first opponent Poland played at home. Hungary won 3–0 in Kraków on May 14, 1922.

The teams played each other again on August 27, 1939, at the Polish Army Stadium in Warsaw in a friendly. This was the last match for both teams before the outbreak of World War II. The match ended in a sensational 4-2 victory for coach Józef Kałuża's team, as Hungary was the runner-up in the 1938 World Cup. The hero of the match was Ernest Wilimowski, who scored a hat trick (33', 62', 75' (f)) and played for the White and Reds for the last time.

The Polish national team won the 1972 Olympic tournament final 2–1 on September 10, 1972, at the Olympic Stadium in Munich, after two goals from the tournament's top scorer, Kazimierz Deyna. Afterwards, coach Kazimierz Górski's team became Olympic champions, thus dethroning Hungary. This tournament victory is considered the beginning of the successes of the so-called Górski Eagles.

== Matches ==
No.	Date	Competition	Venue	Home team	Score	Away team
1	18 October 1921	Friendly	Hidegkuti Nándor Stadion, Budapest	Hungary	1–0	Poland
2	14 May 1922	Friendly	Józef Piłsudski Cracovia Stadium, Kraków	Poland	0–3	Hungary
3	26 May 1924	1924 Summer Olympics	Stade Bergeyre, Paris	Hungary	5–0	Poland
4	31 August 1924	Friendly	Üllői úti stadion, Budapest	Hungary	4–0	Poland
5	19 July 1925	Friendly	Józef Piłsudski Cracovia Stadium, Kraków	Poland	0–2	Hungary
6	20 August 1926	Friendly	Hidegkuti Nándor Stadion, Budapest	Hungary	4–1	Poland
7	27 August 1939	Friendly	Polish Army Stadium, Warsaw	Poland	4–2	Hungary
8	19 September 1948	Friendly	Polish Army Stadium, Warsaw	Poland	2–6	Hungary
9	10 July 1949	Friendly	Nagyerdei Stadium, Debrecen	Hungary	8–2	Poland
10	4 June 1950	Friendly	Polish Army Stadium, Warsaw	Poland	2–5	Hungary
11	27 May 1951	Friendly	Megyeri úti Stadium, Budapeszt	Hungary	6–0	Poland
12	15 June 1952	Friendly	Polish Army Stadium, Warsaw	Poland	1–5	Hungary
13	15 July 1956	Friendly	Ferenc Puskás Stadium, Budepest	Hungary	4–1	Poland
14	14 September 1958	Friendly	Silesia Stadium, Chorzów	Poland	1–3	Hungary
15	13 November 1960	Friendly	Ferenc Puskás Stadium, Budapest	Hungary	4–1	Poland
16	2 September 1962	Friendly	Edmund Szyc Stadium, Poznań	Poland	0–2	Hungary
17	3 May 1966	Friendly	Silesia Stadium, Chorzów	Poland	1–1	Hungary
18	2 May 1970	Friendly	Ferenc Puskás Stadium, Budapest	Hungary	2–0	Poland
19	10 September 1972	1972 Summer Olympics	Olympic Stadium, Munich	Hungary	1–2	Poland
20	8 October 1975	Friendly	Władysław Król Municipal Stadium, Łódź	Poland	4–2	Hungary
21	13 April 1977	Friendly	Ferenc Puskás Stadium, Budapest	Hungary	2–1	Poland
22	4 April 1979	Friendly	Silesia Stadium, Chorzów	Poland	1–1	Hungary
23	26 March 1980	Friendly	Ferenc Puskás Stadium, Budapest	Hungary	2–1	Poland
24	17 May 1987	UEFA Euro 1988 qualifying	Ferenc Puskás Stadium, Budapest	Hungary	5–3	Poland
25	23 September 1987	UEFA Euro 1988 qualifying	Polish Army Stadium, Warsaw	Poland	3–2	Hungary
26	4 May 1994	Friendly	Suche Stawy Stadium, Kraków	Poland	3–2	Hungary
27	6 September 1997	Friendly	Polish Army Stadium, Warsaw	Poland	1–0	Hungary
28	29 March 2000	Friendly	Nagyerdei Stadium, Debrecen	Hungary	0–0	Poland
29	29 March 2003	UEFA Euro 2004 qualifying	Silesia Stadium, Chorzów	Poland	0–0	Hungary
30	11 October 2003	UEFA Euro 2004 qualifying	Ferenc Puskás Stadium, Budapest	Hungary	1–2	Poland
31	17 October 2007	Friendly	Widzew Łódź Stadium, Łódź	Poland	0–1	Hungary
32	15 November 2011	Friendly	Poznań Stadium, Poznań	Poland	2–1	Hungary
33	25 March 2021	2022 FIFA World Cup qualification (UEFA)	Puskás Aréna, Budapest	Hungary	3–3	Poland
34	15 November 2021	2022 FIFA World Cup qualification (UEFA)	National Stadium, Warsaw	Poland	1–2	Hungary

== Statistics ==
As of 15 November 2021

Competition	Hungary wins	Draws	Poland wins
Total	21	5	8

== See also ==
- Hungary–Poland relations
- Pole and Hungarian brothers be
