= János Bánfi =

Hungarian footballer

Personal information
- Date of birth: 9 November 1969 (age 56)
- Place of birth: Újkígyós, Hungary
- Height: 1.82 m (6 ft 0 in)
- Position: Defender

Senior career*
Years	Team	Apps	(Gls)
1987–1989	Békéscsaba	37	(0)
1989–1992	Budapest Honved	29	(0)
1992–1993	Vác	27	(5)
1993–1995	Kispest Honvéd	71	(3)
1995–1998	Aalst	47	(0)

International career
1992–1997	Hungary	25	(0)
- * Club domestic league appearances and goals

János Bánfi (born 9 November 1969) is a Hungarian former professional footballer who played as a defender.
