= Zsolt Szabó =

Zsolt Szabó may refer to:

- Zsolt Szabó (referee) (born 1972), Hungarian football referee
- Zsolt Szabó (Hungarian politician) (born 1963), Hungarian agronomist and politician
- Zsolt Szabó (Dutch politician) (born 1961), Dutch politician
- Zsolt Szabó (racing driver) (born 1995), Hungarian racing driver
- Zsolt Szabó (footballer) (born 1986), Hungarian footballer
