= Julie Stevenson Solt =

American judge (born 1958)

Julie R. Stevenson Solt

Administrative Judge for the Circuit Court for Frederick County
- Incumbent
- Assumed office March 1, 2016
- Preceded by: G. Edward Dwyer, Jr.

Personal details
- Born: November 2, 1958 (age 67) Bethesda, Maryland United States
- Education: Mount Saint Mary's University, B.A. (1980); University of Maryland School of Law, J.D. (1983)

Julie Stevenson Solt (born November 2, 1958) is a judge on the Circuit Court for Frederick County in Maryland. She is the county Administrative Judge.

== Early life and education ==
Solt was born in Bethesda, Maryland. She attended Mount Saint Mary's College (now University), graduating summa cum laude in 1980 with a bachelor of arts. Solt then attended the University of Maryland School of Law. She graduated in 1983 cum laude with a juris doctor. Solt was admitted to Maryland Bar in 1983.

== Career ==
Solt began her career in private practice, working from 1983 to 1989. Solt is a member of the Frederick County Bar Association and the Maryland State's Attorneys' Association. In 1990, Solt began working as the Chief Assistant State's Attorney for the Frederick County Child Support and Juvenile Division. From 1992 to 1998, Solt served as the Deputy States' Attorney for Frederick County.

From December 21, 1998, to March 1, 2016, Solt was an Associate Judge for the Frederick County Circuit Court. In 2000, Solt ran in a primary election against Jerome J. Joyce. In the primary, Solt received fifty-seven percent of the Republican vote and seventy-one percent of the Democratic vote. This allowed her to run unopposed on the general election ballot that fall. Solt received more than 57,500 votes in the Fall 2000 election.

During her time as an Associate Judge, Solt served on many committees and councils. Solt was a member of the Council on Jury Use and Management from 1999 to 2000 and a member of the Criminal Law and Procedure Committee from 2001 to 2004. In November 2004, Solt became the Presiding Judge for the Adult Drug Court Program and was a member of the Drug Treatment Court Commission from 2002 to 2006. Also beginning in 2004, Solt has served on the Maryland State Council for Interstate Adult Offender Supervision. In 2005, Solt became the Designated Judge for the Advanced Science and Technology Adjudication Resource (ASTAR) Center Program. From 2007 to 2008, Solt was on the Problem-Solving Courts Committee and from 2007 to 2008 was on the drug treatment court oversight committee.

From 2008 to 2014, Solt served on the Judicial Compensation Committee for the Maryland Judicial Conference. In 2009, Solt began serving on the Alternative Dispute Resolution Subcommittee for the Conference of Circuit Judges. Since 2009, Solt has also served as the chair for the Public Defender Regional Advisory Board, which advises Allegany, Carroll, Frederick, Garrett, Howard, Montgomery, and Washington counties. From 2010 to 2012, she was on the Ad Hoc Committee on Sentencing Alternatives, Re-Entry, and Best Practices. From 2012 to 2018, Solt was a member of the Judicial Ethics Committee, serving as the vice-chair for the committee from 2014 to 2018.

On March 1, 2016, Solt became the County Administrative Judge for the Frederick County Circuit Court. In April 2016, Solt ran in a primary election receiving votes from 20,151 Democrats and 20,528 Republicans. On November 8, 2016, Solt ran unopposed in the Maryland 6th Circuit Court general election for Frederick County. Her term will end in 2031. Since 2017, Solt has been a member of the Judicial Council for the Maryland Electronic Courts Advisory Committee. She was also the Circuit Representative for the 6th Judicial Circuit Conference of Circuit Judges from 2019 to 2020.

== Personal life ==
Solt was on the Board of Trustees for the Big Brothers Big Sisters of Frederick County from 1984 to 1985. Solt is a resident of Frederick, Maryland.
