= Zsolt Horváth =

Zsolt Horváth may refer to:

- Zsolt Horváth (footballer) (born 1988), Hungarian football player and television sports commentator
- Zsolt Horváth (gymnast) (born 1968), Hungarian gymnast
- Zsolt Horváth (politician, born 1964), Hungarian physician, dentist and politician
- Zsolt Horváth (politician, born 1969), Hungarian jurist and politician
