= Zsolt Nagy =

Zsolt Nagy may refer to:

- Zsolt Nagy (footballer, born 1979), Hungarian footballer
- Zsolt Nagy (footballer, born 1993), Hungarian footballer
- Zsolt Nagy (politician) (born 1971), Romanian politician
