= FIFA World Cup awards =

Men's football awards

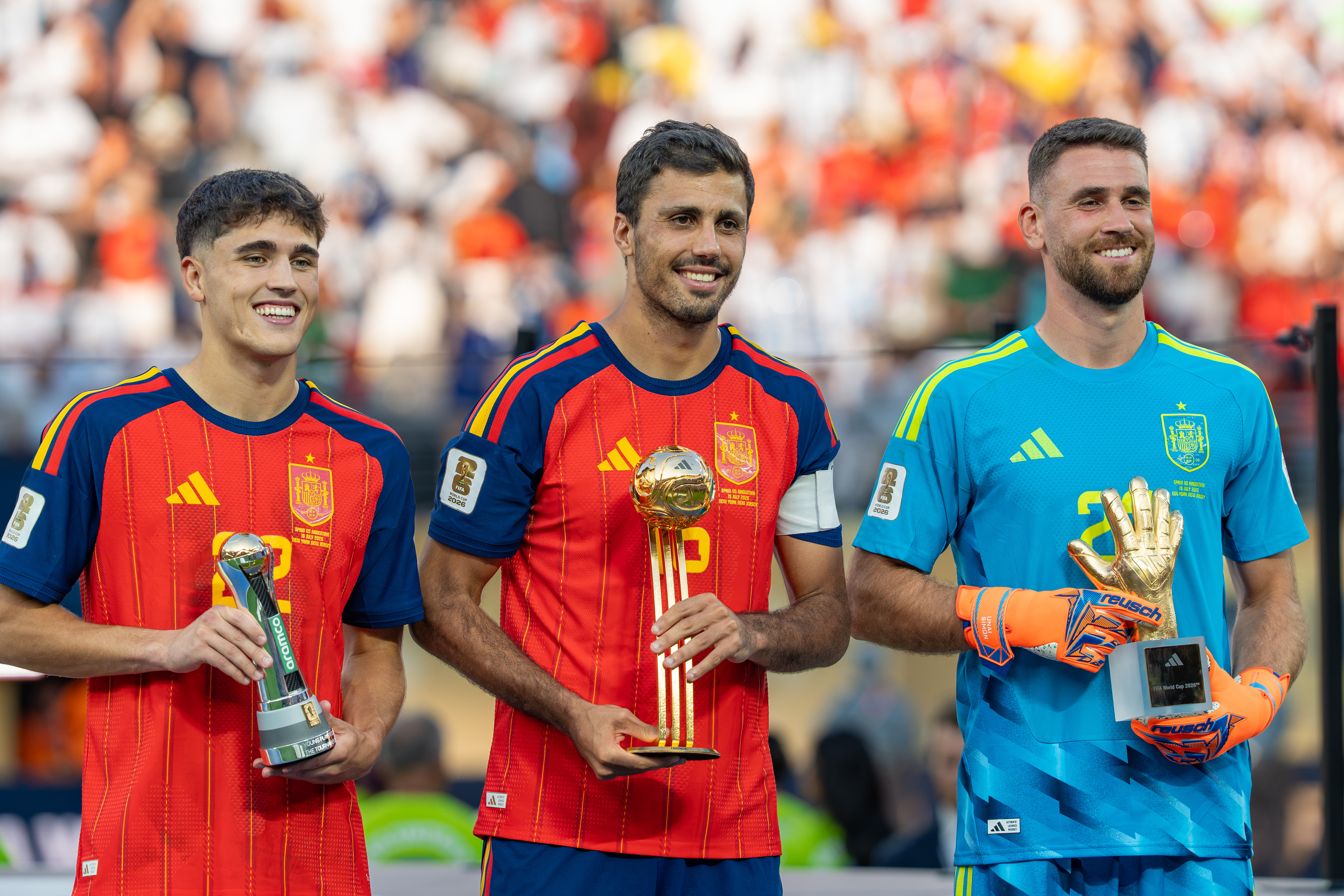
Spain players Pau Cubarsí, Rodri and Unai Simón receiving awards after the 2026 FIFA World Cup final

At the end of each FIFA World Cup final tournament, several awards are presented to the players and teams who have distinguished themselves in various aspects of the game.

== Awards ==
The World Cup winners are symbolically presented with the FIFA World Cup Trophy after the final, but it remains in the custody of FIFA between tournaments. The previous Jules Rimet Trophy was permanently awarded to the Brazilian Football Confederation after the team's third championship in 1970. Squad members and coaching staff of the national teams placing first, second, and third in the tournament receive gold, silver, and bronze medals, respectively. In some tournaments, the fourth-placed team members also received medals after the third-place playoff.

There are five post-tournament awards from the FIFA Technical Study Group:

- the Golden Ball (commercially termed "Adidas Golden Ball") for best player, first awarded in 1982.
- the Golden Boot (commercially termed "Adidas Golden Boot", formerly known as the "Adidas Golden Shoe" from 1982 to 2006) for top goalscorer, first awarded in 1982;
- the Golden Glove (commercially termed "Adidas Golden Glove", formerly known as the "Lev Yashin Award" from 1994 to 2006) for best goalkeeper, first awarded in 1994;
- the FIFA Young Player Award (commercially termed "FIFA Young Player Award, presented by Aramco" since 2026, formerly known as the "Best Young Player Award" from 2006 to 2010) for best player under 21 years of age at the start of the calendar year, first awarded in 2006;
- the FIFA Fair Play Trophy for the team that advanced to the second round with the best record of fair play, first awarded in 1970.

There is one award voted on by fans during the tournament:

- the Player of the Match (commercially termed "Michelob Ultra Superior Player of the Match", formerly known as the "Budweiser Man of the Match" from 2002 to 2018 and "Budweiser Player of the Match" in 2022) for outstanding performance during each match of the tournament, first awarded in 2002.

There are three awards voted on by fans after the conclusion of the tournament:

- the Goal of the Tournament, (commercially termed "Hyundai Goal of the Tournament") for the fans' best goal scored during the tournament, first awarded in 2006;
- the Most Entertaining Team for the team that has entertained the public the most, during the World Cup final tournament, as determined by a poll of the general public.
- the Dream Team, which is considered as a replacement for the All-Star Team. It has been selected by fans in 2002, 2010 to 2018, and 2026.

One other award was given between 1994 and 2006:

- an All-Star Team comprising the best players of the tournament chosen by the FIFA Technical Study Group. From 2010 onwards, all Dream Teams or Statistical Teams are unofficial, as reported by FIFA itself.

== Golden Ball ==
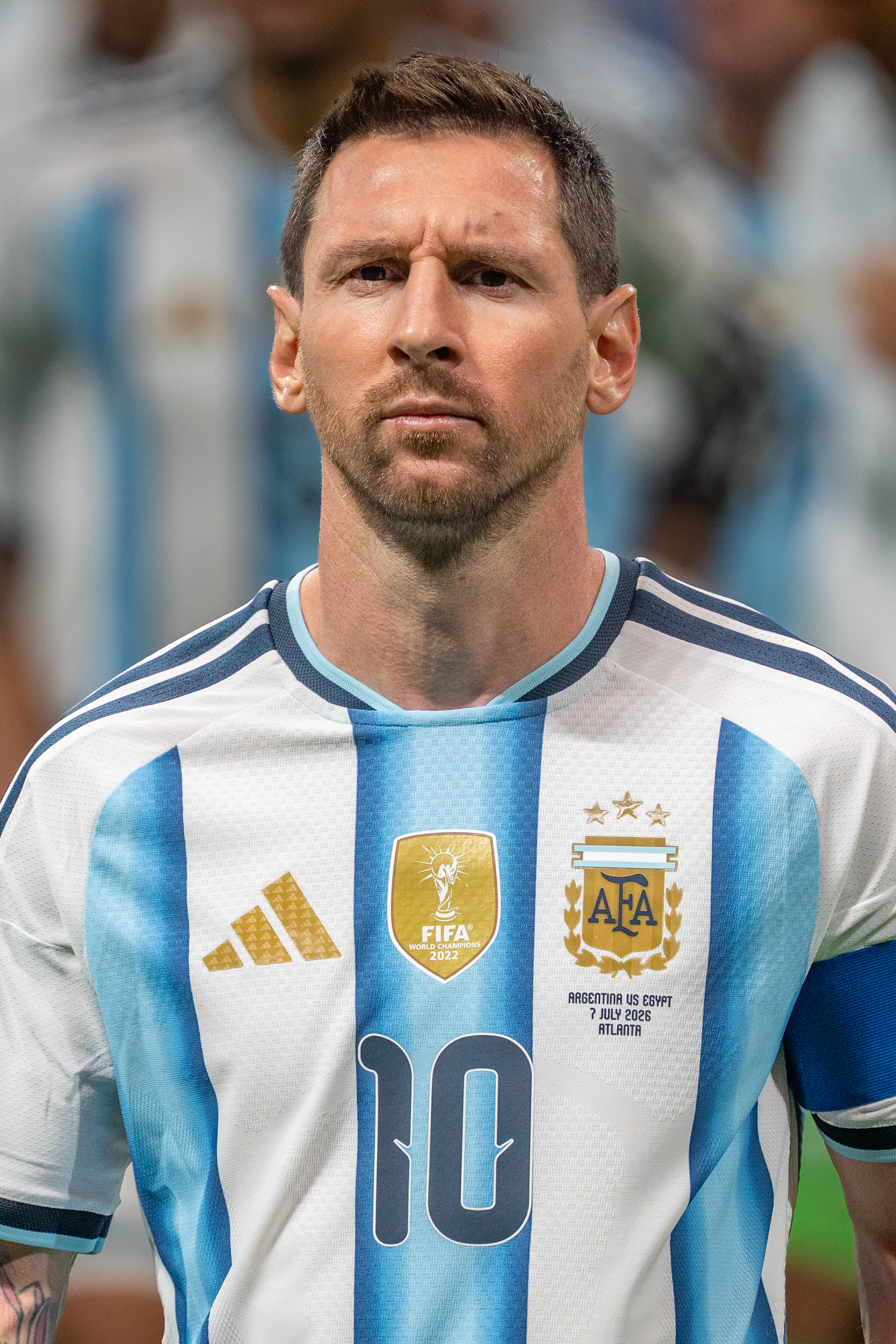
Lionel Messi of Argentina is the only player to win a Golden Ball twice (2014, 2022) and a Golden, Silver (2026), or Bronze Ball thrice.

The Golden Ball award is presented to the best player at each FIFA World Cup finals, with a shortlist drawn up by the FIFA technical committee (Technical Study Group) and the winner voted for by representatives of the media. Those who finish as runners-up in the vote receive the Silver Ball and Bronze Ball awards as the second and third most outstanding players in the tournament respectively. The award was introduced in the 1982 FIFA World Cup, sponsored by Adidas and France Football. Oliver Kahn is to date the only goalkeeper to have won the award, which he did in the 2002 FIFA World Cup. At the 2022 FIFA World Cup, Lionel Messi became the first player to win a second Golden Ball, and at the 2026 FIFA World Cup, he became the only player in history to feature in the top 3 (or 2) players of three different World Cups, winning the Silver Ball.

=== Official winners (1982–present) ===
Golden Ball
World Cup	Golden Ball	Silver Ball	Bronze Ball
1982 Spain	(Italy) Paolo Rossi	(Brazil) Falcão	(West Germany) Karl-Heinz Rummenigge
1986 Mexico	(Argentina) Diego Maradona	(West Germany) Toni Schumacher	(Denmark) Preben Elkjær
1990 Italy	(Italy) Salvatore Schillaci	(West Germany) Lothar Matthäus	(Argentina) Diego Maradona
1994 United States	(Brazil) Romário	(Italy) Roberto Baggio	(Bulgaria) Hristo Stoichkov
1998 France	(Brazil) Ronaldo	(Croatia) Davor Šuker	(France) Lilian Thuram
2002 South Korea–Japan	(Germany) Oliver Kahn	(Brazil) Ronaldo	(South Korea) Hong Myung-bo
2006 Germany	(France) Zinedine Zidane	(Italy) Fabio Cannavaro	(Italy) Andrea Pirlo
2010 South Africa	(Uruguay) Diego Forlán	(Netherlands) Wesley Sneijder	(Spain) David Villa
2014 Brazil	(Argentina) Lionel Messi	(Germany) Thomas Müller	(Netherlands) Arjen Robben
2018 Russia	(Croatia) Luka Modrić	(Belgium) Eden Hazard	(France) Antoine Griezmann
2022 Qatar	(Argentina) Lionel Messi	(France) Kylian Mbappé	(Croatia) Luka Modrić
2026 Canada–Mexico–United States	(Spain) Rodri	(Argentina) Lionel Messi	(France) Kylian Mbappé

=== Unofficial winner (1978) ===
A group of journalists and experts selected the best player of the 1978 tournament, and their selection is recognised by the FIFA website. FIFA recognises only this selection besides the Golden Ball award. Hans Krankl received the same number of votes as Dirceu at the time, and was not chosen as the third best player by FIFA later.

Best player
World Cup	Winner	Runner-up	Third place
1978 Argentina	(Argentina) Mario Kempes	(Italy) Paolo Rossi	(Brazil) Dirceu

=== Contemporary and retrospective selections (1930–1974) ===
On 2 August 1950, Dr. Friedebert Becker, the editor-in-chief of Kicker (then Sport-Magazin), chose his best players of the tournament. France Football, the sponsor of Golden Ball and Ballon d'Or, selected the best player of the 1966 FIFA World Cup at that time with L'Équipe, and Bobby Charlton became the winner. In 1998, the Argentinian newspaper Clarín provided a brief description of each star player dating back to 1930. Some are controversial decisions as is the case with retrospective awards. The 1998 winner was awarded after the tournament ended.

Best players selected by other media
World Cup	Medium	First place	Second place	Third place
1930 Uruguay	ESPN Deportes	(Uruguay) José Nasazzi	—	—
1930 Uruguay	Clarín	(Uruguay) José Nasazzi	—	—
1934 Italy	ESPN Deportes	(Italy) Raimundo Orsi	—	—
1934 Italy	Clarín	(Italy) Giuseppe Meazza	—	—
1938 France	ESPN Deportes	(Italy) Giuseppe Meazza	—	—
1938 France	Clarín	(Brazil) Leônidas	—	—
1950 Brazil	Sport-Magazin	(Brazil) Zizinho	(Uruguay) Alcides Ghiggia	(Brazil) Ademir
1950 Brazil	ESPN Deportes	(Uruguay) Obdulio Varela	—	—
1950 Brazil	Clarín	(Uruguay) Obdulio Varela	—	—
1954 Switzerland	ESPN Deportes	(Hungary) Ferenc Puskás	—	—
1954 Switzerland	Clarín	(Hungary) Ferenc Puskás	—	—
1958 Sweden	ESPN Deportes	(Brazil) Pelé	—	—
1958 Sweden	El Gráfico	(Brazil) Pelé	(Brazil) Garrincha	(Brazil) Vavá
1958 Sweden	Clarín	(Brazil) Pelé	—	—
1962 Chile	ESPN Deportes	(Brazil) Garrincha	—	—
1962 Chile	Clarín	(Brazil) Garrincha	—	—
1966 England	France Football and L'Équipe	(England) Bobby Charlton	(West Germany) Franz Beckenbauer	(Portugal) Eusébio
1966 England	ESPN Deportes	(England) Bobby Charlton	—	—
1966 England	Sofascore	(Portugal) Eusébio	(West Germany) Helmut Haller	(England) Bobby Charlton
1966 England	Castrol Football	(West Germany) Franz Beckenbauer	(West Germany) Helmut Haller	(England) Martin Peters
1966 England	Clarín	(West Germany) Franz Beckenbauer	—	—
1970 Mexico	ESPN Deportes	(Brazil) Pelé	—	—
1970 Mexico	Sofascore	(Brazil) Rivellino	(Brazil) Pelé	(Brazil) Jairzinho
1970 Mexico	Castrol Football	(West Germany) Gerd Müller	(Brazil) Jairzinho	(Brazil) Pelé
1970 Mexico	Clarín	(Brazil) Pelé	—	—
1974 West Germany	ESPN Deportes	(Netherlands) Johan Cruyff	—	—
1974 West Germany	Sofascore	(Netherlands) Johan Cruyff	(Sweden) Ronnie Hellström	(Poland) Kazimierz Deyna
1974 West Germany	Castrol Football	(Netherlands) Johan Cruyff	(Poland) Grzegorz Lato	(Poland) Kazimierz Deyna
1974 West Germany	Clarín	(Netherlands) Johan Cruyff	—	—

== Golden Boot ==
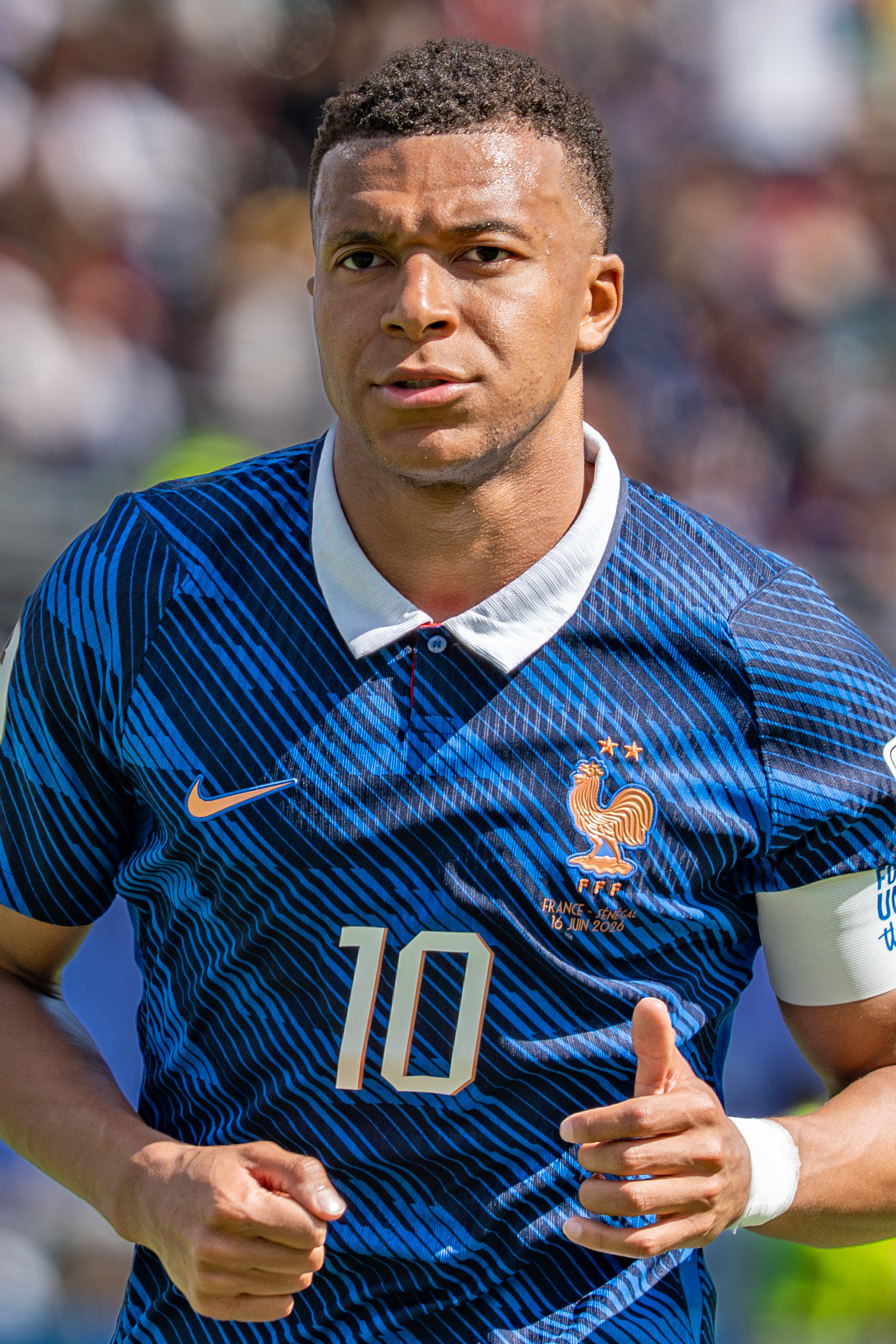
Kylian Mbappé, captain of France, the only player to win the award twice (2022, 2026).

The Golden Boot or Golden Shoe award goes to the top goalscorer of the FIFA World Cup. While every World Cup had a ranking of the goalscorers, the first time an award was given was in 1982, under the name Golden Shoe. It was rechristened Golden Boot in 2010. FIFA sometimes lists the top goalscorers of previous Cups among the Golden Boot winners. If there is more than one player with the same number of goals, since 1994 the tie-breaker goes to the player with more assists. If there is still more than one player, since 2006 the tie is decided by (fewer) minutes played in the tournament. A Silver Boot and a Bronze Boot are also awarded for the second and third-highest goalscorers respectively.

Top goalscorer
World Cup	Top goalscorer	Goals	Runners-up	Goals	Third place	Goals
1930 Uruguay	(Argentina) Guillermo Stábile	8	(Uruguay) Pedro Cea	5	(United States) Bert Patenaude	4
1934 Italy	(Czechoslovakia) Oldřich Nejedlý	5 (Note: FIFA initially credited Nejedlý with only four goals, which would make him joint top scorer with Angelo Schiavio of Italy and Edmund Conen of Germany. However, FIFA changed it to five goals in November 2006, making Nejedlý the outright top scorer.)	(Germany) Edmund Conen (Italy) Angelo Schiavio	4	—N/a	
1938 France	(Brazil) Leônidas	7 (Note: FIFA initially credited Leônidas with eight goals. However, in November 2006, FIFA confirmed that in the quarter-final tie against Czechoslovakia, he had scored once, not twice as FIFA had originally recorded, meaning he had scored only seven goals in total.)	(Hungary) György Sárosi (Hungary) Gyula Zsengellér (Italy) Silvio Piola	5	(Italy) Gino Colaussi (Poland) Ernst Wilimowski	4
1950 Brazil	(Brazil) Ademir	9 (Note: There was controversy regarding the number of goals Brazilian Ademir had scored in 1950, as a result of incomplete data concerning the Final Round game Brazil vs. Spain (6–1). The 5–0 goal had been credited to Jair, but is now credited to Ademir.)	(Uruguay) Óscar Míguez	5	(Uruguay) Alcides Ghiggia (Brazil) Chico (Spain) Estanislau Basora (Spain) Telmo Zarra	4
1954 Switzerland	(Hungary) Sándor Kocsis	11	(Switzerland) Josef Hügi (West Germany) Max Morlock (Austria) Erich Probst	6	—N/a	
1958 Sweden	(France) Just Fontaine	13	(Brazil) Pelé (West Germany) Helmut Rahn	6	—N/a	
1962 Chile	(Hungary) Flórián Albert (Soviet Union) Valentin Ivanov (Brazil) Garrincha (Brazil) Vavá (Socialist Federal Republic of Yugoslavia) Dražan Jerković (Chile) Leonel Sánchez	4	—N/a			
1966 England	(Portugal) Eusébio	9	(West Germany) Helmut Haller	6	(West Germany) Franz Beckenbauer (Hungary) Ferenc Bene (England) Geoff Hurst (Soviet Union) Valeriy Porkujan	4
1970 Mexico	(West Germany) Gerd Müller	10	(Brazil) Jairzinho	7	(Peru) Teófilo Cubillas	5
1974 West Germany	(Poland) Grzegorz Lato	7	(Netherlands) Johan Neeskens (Poland) Andrzej Szarmach	5	—N/a	
1978 Argentina	(Argentina) Mario Kempes	6	(Peru) Teófilo Cubillas (Note: Although Cubillas and Rensenbrink scored the same number of goals, the FIFA website retrospectively credits them with silver and bronze balls respectively.)	5	(Netherlands) Rob Rensenbrink	5
Golden Shoe
World Cup	Golden Shoe	Goals	Silver Shoe	Goals	Bronze Shoe	Goals
1982 Spain	(Italy) Paolo Rossi	6	(West Germany) Karl-Heinz Rummenigge	5	(Brazil) Zico	4
1986 Mexico	(England) Gary Lineker	6	(Spain) Emilio Butragueño (Brazil) Careca (Argentina) Diego Maradona	5	—N/a	
1990 Italy	(Italy) Salvatore Schillaci	6	(Czechoslovakia) Tomáš Skuhravý	5	(Cameroon) Roger Milla	4 (Note: Milla, Míchel, Gary Lineker and Lothar Matthäus all had four goals. FIFA's website listed only Milla with the Bronze Shoe, though technically he tied with Míchel given both had an assist each.)
1994 United States	(Russia) Oleg Salenko (Note: Salenko is the only player to win the award playing for a team that was eliminated in the group stage. His six goals are the only international goals he ever scored.) (Bulgaria) Hristo Stoichkov (Note: Despite the assist tiebreaker, Salenko and Stoichkov remained tied with six goals and one assist each, and both received the Golden Shoe.)	6	—N/a		(Sweden) Kennet Andersson (Brazil) Romário	5 (Note: Romário and Andersson surpassed the other two players with five goals (Jürgen Klinsmann and Roberto Baggio) by having three assists each.)
1998 France	(Croatia) Davor Šuker	6	(Argentina) Gabriel Batistuta (Italy) Christian Vieri	5 (Note: Šuker and Batistuta each had three assists. No other player scored five goals.)	—N/a	
2002 South Korea–Japan	(Brazil) Ronaldo	8 (Note: During the tournament, after the group stage match against Costa Rica, Ronaldo logged a protest against the crediting of a goal as an own goal, and FIFA granted him the change.)	(Germany) Miroslav Klose (Brazil) Rivaldo	5 (Note: Klose and Rivaldo each had one assist. No other player scored five goals.)	—N/a	
2006 Germany	(Germany) Miroslav Klose	5	(Argentina) Hernán Crespo	3 (Note: Eight players had scored three goals. Ronaldo, Crespo and Zinedine Zidane stood out for having one assist, and then the two recipients were determined by less playtime (308 minutes for Crespo, 411 for Ronaldo, 559 for Zidane). (The five players with three goals and no assists were David Villa, Fernando Torres, Maxi Rodriguez, Lukas Podolski, Thierry Henry.))	(Brazil) Ronaldo	3
Golden Boot
World Cup	Golden Boot	Goals	Silver Boot	Goals	Bronze Boot	Goals
2010 South Africa	(Germany) Thomas Müller	5 (Note: Müller, Villa, Sneijder and Diego Forlán tied with five goals. Müller won by virtue of having more assists (three) than the rest (each had one). Villa won the Silver Boot due to playing fewer minutes than Sneijder, and Sneijder won the Bronze Boot due to having played fewer minutes than Forlán.)	(Spain) David Villa	5	(Netherlands) Wesley Sneijder	5
2014 Brazil	(Colombia) James Rodríguez	6	(Germany) Thomas Müller	5	(Brazil) Neymar	4 (Note: Neymar, Lionel Messi and Robin van Persie all had four goals in the tournament. Neymar received the Bronze Boot for playing fewer minutes than his competitors (480; Messi played 693 minutes, and Van Persie, 548).)
2018 Russia	(England) Harry Kane	6	(France) Antoine Griezmann	4 (Note: Griezmann, Lukaku, Denis Cheryshev, Cristiano Ronaldo and Kylian Mbappé tied with four goals. In the assists tiebreaker, Griezmann won the Silver Boot by virtue of having two, while Lukaku got the Bronze Boot as he had one. The rest had zero.)	(Belgium) Romelu Lukaku	4
2022 Qatar	(France) Kylian Mbappé	8	(Argentina) Lionel Messi	7	(France) Olivier Giroud	4 (Note: Giroud and Julián Alvarez tied with four goals. Giroud won the Bronze Boot due to playing fewer minutes than Alvarez.)
2026 Canada–Mexico–United States	(France) Kylian Mbappé	10	(Argentina) Lionel Messi	8	(England) Jude Bellingham	7 (Note: Bellingham and Erling Haaland tied with seven goals. Bellingham won the Bronze Boot by virtue of having more assists (one) than Haaland (zero).)

== Golden Glove ==
The Golden Glove award is awarded to the best goalkeeper of the tournament. The award was introduced with the name "Lev Yashin Award" in 1994, in honour of the late Soviet goalkeeper. It was rechristened "Golden Glove" in 2010. The FIFA Technical Study Group recognises the top goalkeeper of the tournament based on the player's performance throughout the final competition. Although goalkeepers have this specific award for their position, they are still eligible for the Golden Ball as well, as when Oliver Kahn was awarded in 2002.

Official Award
Lev Yashin Award
World Cup	Lev Yashin Award	Clean sheets
1994 United States	(Belgium) Michel Preud'homme	2
1998 France	(France) Fabien Barthez	5
2002 South Korea–Japan	(Germany) Oliver Kahn	5
2006 Germany	(Italy) Gianluigi Buffon	5
Golden Glove
World Cup	Golden Glove	Clean sheets
2010 South Africa	(Spain) Iker Casillas	5
2014 Brazil	(Germany) Manuel Neuer	4
2018 Russia	(Belgium) Thibaut Courtois	3
2022 Qatar	(Argentina) Emiliano Martínez	3
2026 Canada–Mexico–United States	(Spain) Unai Simón	7

== FIFA Young Player Award ==
The FIFA Young Player Award ("Best Young Player Award" 2006–2010) was awarded for the first time at the 2006 World Cup in Germany and given to Germany's Lukas Podolski. The award is given to the best player in the tournament who is at most 21 years old. For the 2022 World Cup, this meant that the player had to have been born on or after 1 January 2001. In 2006, the election took place on FIFA's official World Cup website with the help of The FIFA Technical Study Group.

FIFA organised a survey on the Internet for users to choose the "Best Young Player" of the World Cup, between 1958 and 2002, named the best young player of each tournament. With 61% of the overall vote, the winner was Pelé, who finished ahead of the Peruvian Teófilo Cubillas, the best young player at Mexico 1970, and England's Michael Owen, who reached similar heights at France 98. The winner of the award has only been part of the winning nation four times: Pelé in 1958, Kylian Mbappé in 2018, Enzo Fernández in 2022, and Pau Cubarsí in 2026.

World Cup	FIFA Young Player	Age	Position
1958 Sweden	(Brazil) Pelé	17	FW
1962 Chile	(Hungary) Flórián Albert	20	FW
1966 England	(West Germany) Franz Beckenbauer	20	DF
1970 Mexico	(Peru) Teófilo Cubillas	21	MF
1974 West Germany	(Poland) Władysław Żmuda	20	DF
1978 Argentina	(Italy) Antonio Cabrini	20	DF
1982 Spain	(France) Manuel Amoros	21	DF
1986 Mexico	(Belgium) Enzo Scifo	20	MF
1990 Italy	(Socialist Federal Republic of Yugoslavia) Robert Prosinečki	21	MF
1994 United States	(Netherlands) Marc Overmars	20	FW
1998 France	(England) Michael Owen	18	FW
2002 South Korea–Japan	(United States) Landon Donovan	20	FW
2006 Germany	(Germany) Lukas Podolski	21	FW
2010 South Africa	(Germany) Thomas Müller	20	FW
2014 Brazil	(France) Paul Pogba	21	MF
2018 Russia	(France) Kylian Mbappé	19	FW
2022 Qatar	(Argentina) Enzo Fernández	21	MF
2026 Canada–Mexico–United States	(Spain) Pau Cubarsí	19	DF

== FIFA Fair Play Trophy ==
The FIFA Fair Play Trophy is given to the team with the best record of fair play during the World Cup final tournament since 1970. Only teams that qualified for the second round are considered. The winners of this award earn the FIFA Fair Play Trophy, a diploma, a fair play medal for each player and official, and $50,000 worth of football equipment to be used for youth development. The appearance of the award was originally a certificate. From 1982 to 1990, it was a golden trophy based on Sport Billy, a football-playing cartoon character from 1982 who became an icon for FIFA Fair play. Ever since 1994, it is simply a trophy with an elegant footballer figure. Peru was the first nation to win the award after receiving no yellow or red cards in the 1970 FIFA World Cup held in Mexico.

Peru's FIFA Fair Play trophy award. Peru won the award after receiving no yellow or red cards in the tournament.

World Cup	FIFA Fair Play Trophy winners
1970 Mexico	Peru
1974 West Germany	West Germany
1978 Argentina	Argentina
1982 Spain	Brazil
1986 Mexico	Brazil
1990 Italy	England
1994 United States	Brazil
1998 France	England; France
2002 South Korea–Japan	Belgium
2006 Germany	Brazil; Spain
2010 South Africa	Spain
2014 Brazil	Colombia
2018 Russia	Spain
2022 Qatar	England
2026 Canada–Mexico–United States	Netherlands

== Player of the Match ==
The Player of the Match (POTM) award picks the outstanding player in every match of the tournament. The award was introduced with the name "Man of the Match" in 2002. It was rechristened "Player of the Match" in 2022. While the inaugural two editions were chosen by the technical group, since 2010, the Player of the Match is picked by an online poll on FIFA's website.

World Cup	Player(s) with most POTM wins	Wins
2002 South Korea–Japan	(Brazil) Rivaldo	3
2006 Germany	(Italy) Andrea Pirlo	3
2010 South Africa	(Netherlands) Wesley Sneijder	4
2014 Brazil	(Argentina) Lionel Messi	4
2018 Russia	(France) Antoine Griezmann (Belgium) Eden Hazard (England) Harry Kane (Croatia) Luka Modrić	3
2022 Qatar	(Argentina) Lionel Messi	5
2026 Canada–Mexico–United States	(Argentina) Lionel Messi	5

Total awards
As of 19 July 2026

Rank	Player	Wins	World Cup(s) with awards
1	(Argentina) Lionel Messi	16	2010, 2014, 2018, 2022, 2026
2	(Portugal) Cristiano Ronaldo	9	2010, 2014, 2018, 2022, 2026
3	(France) Kylian Mbappé	8	2018, 2022, 2026
4	(England) Harry Kane	6	2018, 2022, 2026
4	(Netherlands) Arjen Robben	6	2006, 2010, 2014
6	(Croatia) Luka Modrić	5	2018, 2022
6	(Uruguay) Luis Suárez	5	2010, 2014, 2018
8	(England) Jude Bellingham	4	2026
8	(France) Antoine Griezmann	4	2018, 2022
8	(Belgium) Eden Hazard	4	2014, 2018
8	(Japan) Keisuke Honda	4	2010, 2014
8	(Germany) Miroslav Klose	4	2002, 2006
8	(Germany) Thomas Müller	4	2010, 2014
8	(Brazil) Neymar	4	2014, 2018, 2022
8	(South Korea) Park Ji-sung	4	2002, 2006, 2010
8	(Colombia) James Rodríguez	4	2014, 2018
8	(Netherlands) Wesley Sneijder	4	2010

By country
As of 19 July 2026

Rank	Country	Wins	Players
1	Brazil	29	17
2	Argentina	28	11
3	France	27	14
4	Germany	25	14
4	Spain	25	18
6	England	24	15
7	Netherlands	19	9
8	Mexico	18	14
8	Portugal	18	10
10	United States	16	10

== Most Entertaining Team ==
The Most Entertaining Team award was a subjectively awarded prize for the team that had done the most to entertain the public with a positive approach to the game, organised through public participation in a poll starting in 1994 to 2006. It has since been replaced by the All-Star Team and Dream Team.

World Cup	Most Entertaining Team Award
1994 United States	Brazil
1998 France	France
2002 South Korea–Japan	South Korea
2006 Germany	Portugal

== All-Star Team and Dream Team ==
=== Official winners (1994–2006) ===
The All-Star Team is a team of the best performers at the respective World Cup finals. Since 1994, FIFA decided to add official best squads, chosen by its Technical Study Group under the brand name MasterCard All-Star Team. For 1998 and 2002, a distinction was made between starters and reserve members.

All-Star Team
World Cup	Goalkeepers	Defenders	Midfielders	Forwards	Reserves
1994 United States	(Belgium) Michel Preud'homme	(Brazil) Jorginho (Brazil) Márcio Santos (Italy) Paolo Maldini	(Brazil) Dunga (Bulgaria) Krasimir Balakov (Romania) Gheorghe Hagi (Sweden) Tomas Brolin	(Brazil) Romário (Bulgaria) Hristo Stoichkov (Italy) Roberto Baggio	—
1998 France	(France) Fabien Barthez (Paraguay) José Luis Chilavert	(Brazil) Roberto Carlos (France) Marcel Desailly (France) Lilian Thuram (Netherlands) Frank de Boer (Paraguay) Carlos Gamarra	(Brazil) Dunga (Brazil) Rivaldo (Denmark) Michael Laudrup (France) Zinedine Zidane (Netherlands) Edgar Davids	(Brazil) Ronaldo (Croatia) Davor Šuker (Denmark) Brian Laudrup (Netherlands) Dennis Bergkamp	(Netherlands) Edwin van der Sar (Argentina) Juan Sebastián Verón (France) Thierry Henry (Nigeria) Jay-Jay Okocha (England) Michael Owen (Italy) Christian Vieri
2002 South Korea–Japan	(Germany) Oliver Kahn (Turkey) Rüştü Reçber	(Brazil) Roberto Carlos (England) Sol Campbell (Spain) Fernando Hierro (South Korea) Hong Myung-bo (Turkey) Alpay Özalan	(Brazil) Rivaldo (Brazil) Ronaldinho (Germany) Michael Ballack (United States) Claudio Reyna (South Korea) Yoo Sang-chul	(Brazil) Ronaldo (Germany) Miroslav Klose (Senegal) El Hadji Diouf (Turkey) Hasan Şaş	(Spain) Iker Casillas (Brazil) Cafu (Germany) Dietmar Hamann (Spain) Joaquín (Japan) Hidetoshi Nakata (United States) Landon Donovan (Belgium) Marc Wilmots
2006 Germany	(Italy) Gianluigi Buffon (Germany) Jens Lehmann (Portugal) Ricardo	(Argentina) Roberto Ayala (England) John Terry (France) Lilian Thuram (Germany) Philipp Lahm (Italy) Fabio Cannavaro (Italy) Gianluca Zambrotta (Portugal) Ricardo Carvalho	(Brazil) Zé Roberto (France) Patrick Vieira (France) Zinedine Zidane (Germany) Michael Ballack (Italy) Andrea Pirlo (Italy) Gennaro Gattuso (Portugal) Luís Figo (Portugal) Maniche	(Argentina) Hernán Crespo (France) Thierry Henry (Germany) Miroslav Klose (Italy) Luca Toni (Italy) Francesco Totti	—

=== Other selections ===
Many different newspapers, sports journalists, managers and former players have picked their All-Star teams for the tournaments over the years. Newspapers which picked their All-Star teams include Sport-Magazin, Mundo Esportivo, France Football, Associated Press, Estadio, El Gráfico, Goles, Guerin Sportivo, Crónica, El Mercurio, La Prensa, Clarín, La Razón, El País, L'Équipe, Mundo Deportivo, De Volkskrant, La Gazzetta dello Sport, Don Balón, La Stampa, Kicker, Deporte Gráfico, Spotivo Sur, Match, Fußball Woche, Placar, Shoot!, BBC Sport, Süddeutsche Zeitung, Diario AS and Marca.

Sports journalists, managers and former players who picked their All-Star teams include Dr. Friedebert Becker, Gabriel Hanot, Enzo Bearzot, Pelé, Roberto Bettega, Eugenio Bersellini, Giovanni Trapattoni, Massimo Giacomini, Sandro Mazzola, Paolo Carosi, Jimmy Greaves, Pichi Alonso and Johan Cruyff.

Since the beginning many newspapers gave players points to players based on their performances at the World Cup. Some are based in statistics, but some were just rankings given by experts. Castrol Football has given retrospective rankings to players until 1966 with their expert panel consisting of people such as Cristiano Ronaldo, Arsène Wenger, Marcel Desailly, Cafu, Alan Shearer, Emilio Butragueño, Ronald Koeman, Pierluigi Collina, Ottmar Hitzfeld, Gary Bailey, Peter Stöger, Mohamed Al-Deayea and Stanislav Levý.

There are rumours about "official" World Cup All-Star teams across the internet. The same teams have been published on many websites including football.sporting99.com, worldcupbrazil.net, talksport and thesoccerworldcups.com. It is unclear where these teams originated, but the earliest they can be found on the internet was in the October of 2011 on the football.sporting99.com website.

==== Media's selection (1930–1934) ====
Selections by medium
World Cup	Medium	Goalkeeper	Defenders	Midfielders	Forwards
1930 Uruguay	ESPN Deportes	(Kingdom of Yugoslavia) Milovan Jakšić	(Kingdom of Yugoslavia) Milutin Ivković (Uruguay) José Nasazzi	(Uruguay) Álvaro Gestido (Argentina) Luis Monti (Uruguay) José Leandro Andrade	(Uruguay) Pedro Cea (Argentina) Manuel Ferreira (Argentina) Guillermo Stábile (Uruguay) Héctor Scarone (Uruguay) Héctor Castro
1934 Italy	ESPN Deportes	(Spain) Ricardo Zamora	(Italy) Eraldo Monzeglio (Spain) Jacinto Quincoces	(Spain) Leonardo Cilaurren (Italy) Luis Monti (Austria) Franz Wagner	(Italy) Raimundo Orsi (Italy) Giuseppe Meazza (Czechoslovakia) Oldřich Nejedlý (Austria) Matthias Sindelar (Italy) Enrique Guaita
1934 Italy	Lucien Gamblin	(Czechoslovakia) František Plánička	(Austria) Karl Sesta (Spain) Jacinto Quincoces	(Netherlands) Puck van Heel (Hungary) György Szűcs (Austria) Franz Wagner	(Italy) Raimundo Orsi (Czechoslovakia) Oldřich Nejedlý (Spain) Isidro Lángara (Spain) Luis Regueiro (Italy) Enrique Guaita

==== Unofficial winners (1938) ====
FIFA published the first All-Star Team in 1938, but it never made All-Star Team again until 1990 due to ensuing complaints.

Unofficial All-Star Team
World Cup	Goalkeeper	Defenders	Midfielders	Forwards
1938 France	(Czechoslovakia) František Plánička	(Brazil) Domingos da Guia (Italy) Pietro Rava	(Brazil) Zezé Procópio (Italy) Michele Andreolo (Italy) Ugo Locatelli	(Sweden) Arne Nyberg (Italy) Giuseppe Meazza (Brazil) Leônidas (Hungary) György Sárosi (Hungary) Pál Titkos

==== Media's selection (1950–1954) ====
Selections by medium
World Cup	Medium	Goalkeeper	Defenders	Midfielders	Forwards
1950 Brazil	Sport-Magazin	(Uruguay) Roque Máspoli	(Brazil) Juvenal (Uruguay) Matías González	(Uruguay) Víctor Rodríguez Andrade (Uruguay) Obdulio Varela (England) Billy Wright	(Spain) Agustín Gaínza (Brazil) Jair (Brazil) Ademir (Brazil) Zizinho (Uruguay) Alcides Ghiggia
1950 Brazil	Mundo Esportivo	(Brazil) Moacir Barbosa	(Brazil) Juvenal (Uruguay) Matías González	(Uruguay) Víctor Rodríguez Andrade (Uruguay) Obdulio Varela (Brazil) Bauer	(England) Tom Finney (Socialist Federal Republic of Yugoslavia) Rajko Mitić (Brazil) Ademir (Brazil) Zizinho (Uruguay) Alcides Ghiggia
1950 Brazil	ESPN Deportes	(Spain) Antoni Ramallets	(Uruguay) Eusebio Tejera (Uruguay) Matías González (Brazil) Bauer	(Spain) Antonio Puchades (Uruguay) Obdulio Varela	(Spain) Agustín Gaínza (Brazil) Zizinho (Brazil) Ademir (Uruguay) Juan Alberto Schiaffino (Uruguay) Alcides Ghiggia
1950 Brazil	O Globo Sportivo	(Sweden) Kalle Svensson	(Brazil) Juvenal (Uruguay) Matías González	(Uruguay) Víctor Rodríguez Andrade (Uruguay) Obdulio Varela (Brazil) Bauer	(Brazil) Chico (Sweden) Karl-Erik Palmér (Brazil) Ademir (Uruguay) Julio Pérez (Uruguay) Alcides Ghiggia
1954 Switzerland	Mundo Esportivo	(Socialist Federal Republic of Yugoslavia) Vladimir Beara	(England) Billy Wright (Uruguay) William Martínez (Brazil) Djalma Santos	(Hungary) József Bozsik (Austria) Ernst Ocwirk	(West Germany) Hans Schäfer (Uruguay) Juan Alberto Schiaffino (Hungary) Nándor Hidegkuti (Hungary) Sándor Kocsis (Brazil) Julinho
1954 Switzerland	El Gráfico	(Hungary) Gyula Grosics	(Uruguay) William Martínez (Brazil) Djalma Santos	(Brazil) Bauer (Uruguay) Obdulio Varela (Hungary) József Bozsik	(Uruguay) Carlos Borges (Hungary) Ferenc Puskás (Hungary) Nándor Hidegkuti (Hungary) Sándor Kocsis (Brazil) Julinho
1954 Switzerland	ESPN Deportes	(Hungary) Gyula Grosics	(Uruguay) Víctor Rodríguez Andrade (Uruguay) José Santamaría (Hungary) József Bozsik	(West Germany) Fritz Walter (Uruguay) Obdulio Varela (Hungary) Nándor Hidegkuti	(Hungary) Mihály Tóth (Hungary) Ferenc Puskás (Hungary) Sándor Kocsis (Hungary) Zoltán Czibor
1954 Switzerland	RCS MediaGroup	(Hungary) Gyula Grosics	(West Germany) Werner Liebrich (Uruguay) Obdulio Varela (Uruguay) José Santamaría	(Uruguay) Víctor Rodríguez Andrade (Hungary) József Bozsik	(Hungary) Zoltán Czibor (Hungary) Sándor Kocsis (Hungary) Nándor Hidegkuti (West Germany) Fritz Walter (West Germany) Helmut Rahn

==== Unofficial winners (1958) ====
In January 1959, host Swedish Football Association published an All-Star Team based on 720 answers out of 1,200 experts.

Unofficial All-Star Team
World Cup	Goalkeeper	Defenders	Midfielders	Forwards
1958 Sweden	(Northern Ireland) Harry Gregg	(Sweden) Orvar Bergmark (Brazil) Bellini (Brazil) Nílton Santos	(Soviet Union) Yuriy Voynov (West Germany) Horst Szymaniak (Brazil) Didi	(Brazil) Garrincha (France) Raymond Kopa (Brazil) Pelé (Sweden) Lennart Skoglund

==== Media's selection (1962–1986) ====
Selections by medium
World Cup	Medium	Goalkeeper	Defenders	Midfielders	Forwards
1962 Chile	France Football	(Czechoslovakia) Viliam Schrojf	(Czechoslovakia) Ladislav Novák (West Germany) Karl-Heinz Schnellinger (Uruguay) Emilio Álvarez (Chile) Luis Eyzaguirre	(Brazil) Zito (Socialist Federal Republic of Yugoslavia) Dragoslav Šekularac	(Brazil) Mário Zagallo (Soviet Union) Viktor Ponedelnik (West Germany) Uwe Seeler (Brazil) Garrincha
1962 Chile	ESPN Deportes	(Czechoslovakia) Viliam Schrojf	(West Germany) Karl-Heinz Schnellinger (Brazil) Mauro Ramos (Brazil) Zito (Brazil) Djalma Santos	(Brazil) Amarildo (Czechoslovakia) Josef Masopust (Soviet Union) Valery Voronin	(Socialist Federal Republic of Yugoslavia) Josip Skoblar (Brazil) Vavá (Brazil) Garrincha
1962 Chile	RCS MediaGroup	(Brazil) Gilmar	(West Germany) Karl-Heinz Schnellinger (Brazil) Mauro Ramos (Brazil) Djalma Santos	(Czechoslovakia) Josef Masopust (Brazil) Zito (Soviet Union) Valery Voronin	(Spain) Paco Gento (Brazil) Amarildo (West Germany) Helmut Haller (Brazil) Garrincha
1966 England	Associated Press	(England) Gordon Banks	(Argentina) Silvio Marzolini (England) Bobby Moore (West Germany) Willi Schulz (Brazil) Djalma Santos	(Soviet Union) Valery Voronin (England) Bobby Charlton (West Germany) Franz Beckenbauer	(Portugal) António Simões (Portugal) Eusébio (Hungary) Ferenc Bene
1966 England	Estadio	(England) Gordon Banks	(Argentina) Silvio Marzolini (England) Bobby Moore (England) Jack Charlton (Soviet Union) Vladimir Ponomaryov	(West Germany) Franz Beckenbauer (England) Bobby Charlton (Hungary) Flórián Albert	(Portugal) António Simões (Portugal) Eusébio (England) Geoff Hurst
1966 England	SportGráfico	(England) Gordon Banks	(Argentina) Silvio Marzolini (England) Bobby Moore (England) Jack Charlton (Argentina) Roberto Ferreiro	(West Germany) Franz Beckenbauer (England) Bobby Charlton	(Portugal) António Simões (Hungary) Flórián Albert (West Germany) Uwe Seeler (Hungary) Ferenc Bene
1966 England	ESPN Deportes	(England) Gordon Banks	(Argentina) Silvio Marzolini (West Germany) Franz Beckenbauer (England) Bobby Moore (West Germany) Horst-Dieter Höttges	(England) Bobby Charlton (West Germany) Helmut Haller	(Portugal) António Simões (England) Geoff Hurst (Portugal) Eusébio (Hungary) Ferenc Bene
1966 England	Castrol Football	(England) Gordon Banks	(England) Ray Wilson (England) Bobby Moore (West Germany) Wolfgang Weber (England) George Cohen	(West Germany) Helmut Haller (West Germany) Franz Beckenbauer (Portugal) José Augusto (England) Martin Peters	(Portugal) Eusébio (Portugal) José Torres
1966 England	Sofascore	(Uruguay) Ladislao Mazurkiewicz	(England) Bobby Moore (North Korea) Shin Yung-kyoo (England) Jack Charlton	(England) Martin Peters (England) Bobby Charlton (West Germany) Franz Beckenbauer (West Germany) Helmut Haller	(Portugal) Eusébio (West Germany) Uwe Seeler (Hungary) Ferenc Bene
1966 England	RCS MediaGroup	(England) Gordon Banks	(Argentina) Silvio Marzolini (England) Bobby Moore (England) George Cohen	(Portugal) Mário Coluna (Soviet Union) Valery Voronin (West Germany) Franz Beckenbauer (West Germany) Wolfgang Overath	(England) Geoff Hurst (Portugal) Eusébio (England) Bobby Charlton
1966 England	Le Miroir des sports	(Soviet Union) Lev Yashin	(Argentina) Silvio Marzolini (West Germany) Willi Schulz (England) Jack Charlton (England) George Cohen	(England) Bobby Charlton (West Germany) Franz Beckenbauer	(Soviet Union) Igor Chislenko (Hungary) Flórián Albert (Portugal) Eusébio (Hungary) Ferenc Bene
1970 Mexico	ESPN Deportes	(Uruguay) Ladislao Mazurkiewicz	(Italy) Giacinto Facchetti (West Germany) Franz Beckenbauer (Brazil) Wilson Piazza (Brazil) Carlos Alberto Torres	(Brazil) Gérson (Brazil) Clodoaldo	(Brazil) Rivellino (Brazil) Pelé (Germany) Gerd Müller (Brazil) Jairzinho
1970 Mexico	Castrol Football	(Soviet Union) Anzor Kavazashvili	(Uruguay) Juan Mujica (Uruguay) Roberto Matosas (Uruguay) Atilio Ancheta (Uruguay) Luis Ubiña	(Brazil) Rivellino (Peru) Teófilo Cubillas (Uruguay) Ildo Maneiro (Brazil) Jairzinho	(Brazil) Pelé (Germany) Gerd Müller
1970 Mexico	Sofascore	(Italy) Enrico Albertosi	(Mexico) Javier Guzmán (England) Bobby Moore (Germany) Franz Beckenbauer	(Brazil) Rivellino (Peru) Teófilo Cubillas (Brazil) Gérson (Brazil) Jairzinho	(Brazil) Pelé (Germany) Gerd Müller (Germany) Uwe Seeler
1974 West Germany	Estadio	(West Germany) Sepp Maier	(West Germany) Paul Breitner (West Germany) Franz Beckenbauer (Chile) Elías Figueroa (West Germany) Berti Vogts	(West Germany) Wolfgang Overath (Netherlands) Johan Neeskens (Netherlands) Wim Jansen	(Poland) Robert Gadocha (Netherlands) Johan Cruyff (Poland) Grzegorz Lato
1974 West Germany	English and Italian journalists	(Poland) Jan Tomaszewski	(Brazil) Marinho Chagas (West Germany) Franz Beckenbauer (Netherlands) Wim Rijsbergen (West Germany) Paul Breitner	(Poland) Kazimierz Deyna (West Germany) Wolfgang Overath (Netherlands) Johan Neeskens	(Poland) Robert Gadocha (Netherlands) Johan Cruyff (Poland) Grzegorz Lato
1974 West Germany	De Volkskrant	(Sweden) Ronnie Hellström	(Netherlands) Ruud Krol (West Germany) Franz Beckenbauer (Brazil) Luís Pereira (Argentina) Enrique Wolff	(Netherlands) Willem van Hanegem (Poland) Kazimierz Deyna (Netherlands) Johan Neeskens	(Poland) Robert Gadocha (Netherlands) Johan Cruyff (Argentina) Rubén Ayala
1974 West Germany	Jornal dos Sports	(Sweden) Ronnie Hellström	(West Germany) Paul Breitner (West Germany) Franz Beckenbauer (Chile) Elías Figueroa (Brazil) Luís Pereira	(Netherlands) Johan Neeskens (Scotland) Billy Bremner	(Poland) Robert Gadocha (West Germany) Gerd Müller (Netherlands) Johan Cruyff (Poland) Grzegorz Lato
1974 West Germany	El Gráfico	(Sweden) Ronnie Hellström	(West Germany) Paul Breitner (West Germany) Franz Beckenbauer (Netherlands) Wim Rijsbergen (Poland) Antoni Szymanowski	(Sweden) Ralf Edström (Poland) Kazimierz Deyna (Netherlands) Johan Neeskens	(Poland) Robert Gadocha (Netherlands) Johan Cruyff (Poland) Grzegorz Lato
1974 West Germany	József Hoffer	(West Germany) Sepp Maier	(West Germany) Paul Breitner (West Germany) Franz Beckenbauer (Brazil) Luís Pereira (Netherlands) Wim Suurbier	(Argentina) Carlos Babington (Netherlands) Johan Cruyff (Poland) Kazimierz Deyna	(Poland) Robert Gadocha (West Germany) Gerd Müller (Poland) Grzegorz Lato
1974 West Germany	ESPN Deportes	(Poland) Jan Tomaszewski	(Brazil) Marinho Chagas (Netherlands) Wim Suurbier (West Germany) Franz Beckenbauer (West Germany) Berti Vogts	(Socialist Federal Republic of Yugoslavia) Branko Oblak (Netherlands) Johan Neeskens (Poland) Kazimierz Deyna (Netherlands) Rob Rensenbrink	(Poland) Grzegorz Lato (Netherlands) Johan Cruyff
1974 West Germany	Castrol Football	(Sweden) Ronnie Hellström	(Netherlands) Ruud Krol (Netherlands) Wim Rijsbergen (West Germany) Franz Beckenbauer (Netherlands) Wim Suurbier	(Netherlands) Johan Cruyff (Poland) Kazimierz Deyna (Netherlands) Arie Haan (Poland) Grzegorz Lato	(Netherlands) Johnny Rep (West Germany) Gerd Müller
1974 West Germany	Sofascore	(Sweden) Ronnie Hellström	(West Germany) Paul Breitner (Brazil) Luís Pereira (West Germany) Franz Beckenbauer (Poland) Antoni Szymanowski	(Poland) Kazimierz Deyna (Germany) Rainer Bonhof (Netherlands) Johan Neeskens	(Sweden) Ralf Edström (Netherlands) Johan Cruyff (Poland) Grzegorz Lato
1978 Argentina	Goles	(Argentina) Ubaldo Fillol	(Italy) Antonio Cabrini (Argentina) Daniel Passarella (Netherlands) Ruud Krol (Brazil) Toninho	(Argentina) Mario Kempes (Italy) Romeo Benetti (Poland) Zbigniew Boniek	(Netherlands) Rob Rensenbrink (Argentina) Leopoldo Luque (Italy) Franco Causio
1978 Argentina	Guerin Sportivo	(Argentina) Ubaldo Fillol	(Italy) Antonio Cabrini (Argentina) Daniel Passarella (Brazil) Amaral (Italy) Claudio Gentile	(Brazil) Dirceu (Argentina) Mario Kempes (Netherlands) Arie Haan	(Netherlands) Rob Rensenbrink (Italy) Paolo Rossi (Austria) Hans Krankl
1978 Argentina	Crónica and El Mercurio	(Argentina) Ubaldo Fillol	(Italy) Antonio Cabrini (Italy) Gaetano Scirea (Netherlands) Ruud Krol (Austria) Robert Sara	(Peru) Teófilo Cubillas (Italy) Romeo Benetti (Poland) Kazimierz Deyna	(Italy) Roberto Bettega (Argentina) Leopoldo Luque (Italy) Franco Causio
1978 Argentina	Enzo Bearzot	(Argentina) Ubaldo Fillol	(France) Maxime Bossis (Argentina) Daniel Passarella (France) Marius Trésor (Brazil) Toninho	(Netherlands) Arie Haan (Brazil) Dirceu (Brazil) Batista (Hungary) Sándor Pintér	(Argentina) Mario Kempes (Austria) Hans Krankl
1978 Argentina	La Prensa	(Brazil) Émerson Leão	(Italy) Antonio Cabrini (Brazil) Amaral (Netherlands) Ruud Krol (Brazil) Toninho	(Argentina) Mario Kempes (Argentina) Osvaldo Ardiles (Poland) Kazimierz Deyna	(Italy) Roberto Bettega (Italy) Paolo Rossi (Argentina) Daniel Bertoni
1978 Argentina	Clarín	(Argentina) Ubaldo Fillol	(Argentina) Alberto Tarantini (Italy) Mauro Bellugi (Netherlands) Ruud Krol (Brazil) Toninho	(Argentina) Mario Kempes (Argentina) Américo Gallego (Netherlands) Johan Neeskens	(Netherlands) Rob Rensenbrink (Argentina) Leopoldo Luque (Italy) Franco Causio
1978 Argentina	La Razón	(Argentina) Ubaldo Fillol	(Italy) Antonio Cabrini (Argentina) Daniel Passarella (Netherlands) Ruud Krol (West Germany) Berti Vogts	(Argentina) Mario Kempes (Italy) Romeo Benetti (Brazil) Dirceu	(Netherlands) Rob Rensenbrink (Italy) Paolo Rossi (Italy) Franco Causio
1978 Argentina	El País	(Argentina) Ubaldo Fillol	(Netherlands) Arie Haan (Argentina) Daniel Passarella (France) Marius Trésor (West Germany) Berti Vogts	(Argentina) Mario Kempes (Netherlands) René van de Kerkhof (Brazil) Dirceu	(Italy) Roberto Bettega (Italy) Paolo Rossi (Tunisia) Témime Lahzami
1978 Argentina	Pelé	(Argentina) Ubaldo Fillol	(Italy) Antonio Cabrini (Argentina) Daniel Passarella (Netherlands) Ruud Krol (Austria) Robert Sara	(Argentina) Mario Kempes (France) Michel Platini (Brazil) Batista	(Netherlands) Rob Rensenbrink (Italy) Paolo Rossi (Italy) Franco Causio
1978 Argentina	ESPN Deportes	(Argentina) Ubaldo Fillol	(Italy) Antonio Cabrini (Argentina) Daniel Passarella (Netherlands) Ruud Krol (Brazil) Nelinho	(Peru) Teófilo Cubillas (Argentina) Américo Gallego (Italy) Marco Tardelli	(Netherlands) Rob Rensenbrink (Argentina) Mario Kempes (Italy) Paolo Rossi
1978 Argentina	Castrol Football	(Brazil) Émerson Leão	(Netherlands) Ruud Krol (Argentina) Daniel Passarella (Italy) Gaetano Scirea (West Germany) Manfred Kaltz	(Netherlands) Wim Jansen (Netherlands) Arie Haan (Germany) Rainer Bonhof (Poland) Grzegorz Lato	(Argentina) Mario Kempes (Austria) Hans Krankl
1978 Argentina	Sofascore	(Peru) Ramón Quiroga	(Argentina) Daniel Passarella (Netherlands) Ruud Krol (Argentina) Luis Galván	(Netherlands) Rob Rensenbrink (Netherlands) Willy van de Kerkhof (Germany) Rainer Bonhof (Netherlands) Arie Haan (Argentina) Daniel Bertoni	(Germany) Karl-Heinz Rummenigge (Argentina) Mario Kempes
1982 Spain	Guerin Sportivo	(Italy) Dino Zoff	(Brazil) Léo Júnior (Argentina) Daniel Passarella (Soviet Union) Sergei Baltacha (Italy) Claudio Gentile	(Poland) Zbigniew Boniek (France) Alain Giresse (Brazil) Paulo Roberto Falcão	(Brazil) Éder Aleixo (Italy) Paolo Rossi (Italy) Bruno Conti
1982 Spain	Pelé	(Soviet Union) Rinat Dasayev	(Brazil) Léo Júnior (Argentina) Daniel Passarella (Italy) Gaetano Scirea (Italy) Claudio Gentile	(Argentina) Diego Maradona (France) Alain Giresse (Brazil) Paulo Roberto Falcão	(Poland) Zbigniew Boniek (Italy) Paolo Rossi (Italy) Bruno Conti
1982 Spain	El Gráfico	(Italy) Dino Zoff	(Brazil) Léo Júnior (Argentina) Daniel Passarella (West Germany) Uli Stielike (Brazil) Leandro	(Brazil) Paulo Roberto Falcão (France) Alain Giresse (Argentina) Osvaldo Ardiles	(Germany) Karl-Heinz Rummenigge (Italy) Paolo Rossi (Italy) Bruno Conti
1982 Spain	L'Équipe	(Italy) Dino Zoff	(Italy) Antonio Cabrini (France) Marius Trésor (West Germany) Karlheinz Förster (Italy) Claudio Gentile	(France) Alain Giresse (Brazil) Paulo Roberto Falcão (Italy) Marco Tardelli (Brazil) Toninho Cerezo	(Italy) Paolo Rossi (Brazil) Zico
1982 Spain	Mundo Deportivo	(Soviet Union) Rinat Dasayev	(Brazil) Léo Júnior (West Germany) Uli Stielike (Italy) Fulvio Collovati (Italy) Claudio Gentile	(Italy) Giancarlo Antognoni (Poland) Zbigniew Boniek (Brazil) Sócrates (Brazil) Paulo Roberto Falcão	(Italy) Paolo Rossi (Italy) Bruno Conti
1982 Spain	La Gazzetta dello Sport	(Italy) Dino Zoff	(Brazil) Léo Júnior (Italy) Fulvio Collovati (Italy) Gaetano Scirea (Italy) Claudio Gentile	(Brazil) Toninho Cerezo (Poland) Zbigniew Boniek (Brazil) Paulo Roberto Falcão	(West Germany) Pierre Littbarski (Italy) Paolo Rossi (Italy) Bruno Conti
1982 Spain	Estadio	(Soviet Union) Rinat Dasayev	(Italy) Antonio Cabrini (Italy) Gaetano Scirea (Italy) Fulvio Collovati (Italy) Claudio Gentile	(Italy) Bruno Conti (France) Alain Giresse (Italy) Marco Tardelli (Brazil) Paulo Roberto Falcão	(West Germany) Karl-Heinz Rummenigge (Italy) Paolo Rossi
1982 Spain	Don Balón	(Soviet Union) Rinat Dasayev	(Brazil) Léo Júnior (Argentina) Daniel Passarella (Italy) Gaetano Scirea (Belgium) Eric Gerets	(Italy) Bruno Conti (France) Michel Platini (France) Alain Giresse (Brazil) Paulo Roberto Falcão	(Poland) Zbigniew Boniek (Italy) Paolo Rossi
1982 Spain	ESPN Deportes	(Soviet Union) Rinat Dasayev	(Brazil) Léo Júnior (Argentina) Daniel Passarella (Italy) Gaetano Scirea (Belgium) Eric Gerets	(France) Michel Platini (Brazil) Paulo Roberto Falcão (France) Alain Giresse (Italy) Bruno Conti	(Italy) Paolo Rossi (Brazil) Sócrates
1982 Spain	Castrol Football	(Poland) Józef Młynarczyk	(Italy) Antonio Cabrini (West Germany) Paul Breitner (Italy) Gaetano Scirea (England) Mick Mills	(West Germany) Uli Stielike (Brazil) Zico (France) Alain Giresse (West Germany) Pierre Littbarski	(Italy) Paolo Rossi (Poland) Zbigniew Boniek
1982 Spain	Sofascore	(Poland) Józef Młynarczyk	(Brazil) Léo Júnior (Argentina) Daniel Passarella (Austria) Bruno Pezzey	(Belgium) Franky Vercauteren (Brazil) Zico (Poland) Zbigniew Boniek (France) Michel Platini (France) Alain Giresse	(Italy) Paolo Rossi (Germany) Karl-Heinz Rummenigge
1986 Mexico	France Football	(Belgium) Jean-Marie Pfaff	(France) Manuel Amoros (France) Maxime Bossis (West Germany) Karlheinz Förster (Belgium) Eric Gerets	(Argentina) Diego Maradona (France) Jean Tigana (Argentina) Jorge Burruchaga (West Germany) Lothar Matthäus	(West Germany) Klaus Allofs (Argentina) Jorge Valdano
1986 Mexico	Kicker	(West Germany) Toni Schumacher	(Belgium) Stéphane Demol (West Germany) Karlheinz Förster (Denmark) Morten Olsen (Brazil) Josimar	(France) Luis Fernandez (Brazil) Elzo Coelho (West Germany) Lothar Matthäus (Argentina) Jorge Burruchaga	(Argentina) Diego Maradona (Soviet Union) Igor Belanov
1986 Mexico	El Gráfico	(Argentina) Nery Pumpido	(Spain) Julio Alberto (Argentina) Oscar Ruggeri (Denmark) Morten Olsen (France) Manuel Amoros	(Argentina) Diego Maradona (Argentina) Jorge Burruchaga (France) Luis Fernandez (Brazil) Elzo Coelho	(Brazil) Careca (Denmark) Preben Elkjær
1986 Mexico	Guerin Sportivo	(Belgium) Jean-Marie Pfaff	(West Germany) Hans-Peter Briegel (Brazil) Júlio César (Denmark) Morten Olsen (Brazil) Josimar	(Argentina) Diego Maradona (Denmark) Søren Lerby (Italy) Fernando De Napoli	(Denmark) Preben Elkjær (Brazil) Careca (Soviet Union) Ivan Yaremchuk
1986 Mexico	La Gazzetta dello Sport	(Belgium) Jean-Marie Pfaff	(France) Manuel Amoros (Denmark) Morten Olsen (Brazil) Júlio César (Belgium) Eric Gerets	(Belgium) Jan Ceulemans (West Germany) Felix Magath (Spain) Míchel	(England) Gary Lineker (Argentina) Diego Maradona (Denmark) Preben Elkjær
1986 Mexico	La Stampa	(Belgium) Jean-Marie Pfaff	(France) Manuel Amoros (Argentina) José Luis Brown (West Germany) Karlheinz Förster (Brazil) Josimar	(West Germany) Lothar Matthäus (Belgium) Jan Ceulemans (Soviet Union) Pavlo Yakovenko (Argentina) Jorge Burruchaga	(Argentina) Diego Maradona (Soviet Union) Igor Belanov
1986 Mexico	Bob Paisley	(England) Peter Shilton	(Brazil) Branco (France) Maxime Bossis (West Germany) Karlheinz Förster (France) Manuel Amoros	(France) Jean Tigana (France) Michel Platini (Argentina) Diego Maradona (Belgium) Enzo Scifo	(Brazil) Careca (Denmark) Preben Elkjær
1986 Mexico	ESPN Deportes	(Belgium) Jean-Marie Pfaff	(France) Manuel Amoros (Argentina) Oscar Ruggeri (Brazil) Júlio César (Brazil) Josimar	(Argentina) Jorge Burruchaga (Argentina) Diego Maradona (France) Luis Fernandez (France) Michel Platini	(England) Gary Lineker (Spain) Emilio Butragueño
1986 Mexico	Castrol Football	(Brazil) Carlos Gallo	(Mexico) Raúl Servín (Mexico) Fernando Quirarte (Argentina) José Luis Brown (Argentina) José Luis Cuciuffo	(Argentina) Jorge Burruchaga (Argentina) Diego Maradona (France) Michel Platini (France) Jean Tigana	(England) Gary Lineker (Brazil) Careca
1986 Mexico	Sofascore	(France) Joël Bats	(West Germany) Andreas Brehme (Brazil) Júlio César (Mexico) Fernando Quirarte (France) Manuel Amoros	(West Germany) Lothar Matthäus (Argentina) Diego Maradona (Argentina) Jorge Burruchaga	(Soviet Union) Igor Belanov (Brazil) Careca (Denmark) Preben Elkjær

==== Unofficial winners (1990) ====
In 1990, there was an All-Star Team announced in combination with the Golden Ball ceremony. It was chosen by the same journalists who chose the best player, but this team is still considered unofficial.

Unofficial FIFA All-Star Team
World Cup	Goalkeeper	Defenders	Midfielders	Forwards	Reserves
1990 Italy	(Brazil) Cláudio Taffarel	(Brazil) Jorginho (Italy) Giuseppe Bergomi (Italy) Franco Baresi (West Germany) Guido Buchwald (West Germany) Andreas Brehme	(Italy) Roberto Donadoni (West Germany) Lothar Matthäus (Belgium) Enzo Scifo	(Italy) Salvatore Schillaci (West Germany) Jürgen Klinsmann	(Costa Rica) Gabelo Conejo (Brazil) Branco (England) Des Walker (Socialist Federal Republic of Yugoslavia) Dragan Stojković (Cameroon) Roger Milla

==== Fans' winners (Dream Team) (2002, 2010–2018, 2026) ====
In 2002, the tournament's sponsor MasterCard announced fans' All-Star Team based on the results of an online poll as well as official All-Star Team. Between 2010 and 2018, the Fan Dream Team was voted by online poll of FIFA website. FIFA explained these are not official. The Dream XI was voted for by fans in an online poll in 2026.

Fans' All-Star Team/Dream Team
World Cup	Goalkeeper	Defenders	Midfielders	Forwards	Manager
2002 South Korea–Japan	(South Korea) Lee Woon-jae	(Brazil) Roberto Carlos (South Korea) Hong Myung-bo (England) Sol Campbell (Brazil) Cafu	(South Korea) Yoo Sang-chul (England) David Beckham (Germany) Michael Ballack (Japan) Hidetoshi Nakata	(South Korea) Ahn Jung-hwan (South Korea) Park Ji-sung	—
2010 South Africa	(Spain) Iker Casillas	(Germany) Philipp Lahm (Spain) Sergio Ramos (Spain) Carles Puyol (Brazil) Maicon	(Spain) Xavi (Germany) Bastian Schweinsteiger (Netherlands) Wesley Sneijder (Spain) Andrés Iniesta	(Spain) David Villa (Uruguay) Diego Forlán	(Spain) Vicente del Bosque
2014 Brazil	(Germany) Manuel Neuer	(Brazil) Marcelo (Germany) Mats Hummels (Brazil) David Luiz (Brazil) Thiago Silva	(Argentina) Ángel Di María (Germany) Toni Kroos (Colombia) James Rodríguez	(Brazil) Neymar (Germany) Thomas Müller (Argentina) Lionel Messi	(Germany) Joachim Löw
2018 Russia	(Belgium) Thibaut Courtois	(Brazil) Marcelo (France) Raphaël Varane (Uruguay) Diego Godín (Brazil) Thiago Silva	(Brazil) Philippe Coutinho (Croatia) Luka Modrić (Belgium) Kevin De Bruyne	(Portugal) Cristiano Ronaldo (England) Harry Kane (France) Kylian Mbappé	—
2026 Canada–Mexico–United States	(Cape Verde) Vozinha	(Spain) Marc Cucurella (France) Dayot Upamecano (Argentina) Lisandro Martínez (Spain) Pedro Porro	(England) Jude Bellingham (Spain) Rodri (France) Michael Olise	(Argentina) Lionel Messi (Norway) Erling Haaland (France) Kylian Mbappé	—

==== Statistical winners (2010–2018) ====
After FIFA changed its sponsor from MasterCard to Visa in 2007, it published Team of the Tournament based on statistical data of other sponsors as well, which evaluates players' performances. FIFA explained these are not official.

Statistical Team of the Tournament
World Cup	Standard	Goalkeeper	Defenders	Midfielders	Forwards
2010 South Africa	Castrol Football	(Germany) Manuel Neuer	(Spain) Joan Capdevila (Germany) Philipp Lahm (Spain) Carles Puyol (Spain) Sergio Ramos	(Netherlands) Mark van Bommel (Germany) Thomas Müller (Netherlands) Wesley Sneijder (Spain) Sergio Busquets	(Spain) David Villa (Uruguay) Luis Suárez
2014 Brazil	Castrol Football	(Germany) Manuel Neuer	(Argentina) Marcos Rojo (Germany) Mats Hummels (Brazil) Thiago Silva (Netherlands) Stefan de Vrij	(Brazil) Oscar (Germany) Toni Kroos (Germany) Philipp Lahm (Colombia) James Rodríguez	(Netherlands) Arjen Robben (Germany) Thomas Müller
2018 Russia	Fantasy Football	(Belgium) Thibaut Courtois	(Sweden) Andreas Granqvist (France) Raphaël Varane (Brazil) Thiago Silva (Colombia) Yerry Mina	(Russia) Denis Cheryshev (Brazil) Philippe Coutinho (Croatia) Luka Modrić	(England) Harry Kane (Belgium) Eden Hazard (France) Antoine Griezmann

==== Media's selection (2022) ====
Selections by medium
World Cup	Medium	Goalkeeper	Defenders	Midfielders	Forwards
2022 Qatar	The Guardian	(Argentina) Emiliano Martínez	(Morocco) Noussair Mazraoui (Croatia) Joško Gvardiol (England) John Stones (Morocco) Achraf Hakimi	(France) Antoine Griezmann (Argentina) Alexis Mac Allister (Morocco) Sofyan Amrabat	(France) Kylian Mbappé (Argentina) Julián Alvarez (Argentina) Lionel Messi
2022 Qatar	ARD Sportschau	(Argentina) Emiliano Martínez	(Argentina) Cristian Romero (Croatia) Joško Gvardiol (Morocco) Achraf Hakimi	(Argentina) Ángel Di María (England) Jude Bellingham (Morocco) Sofyan Amrabat (Argentina) Alexis Mac Allister	(France) Kylian Mbappé (Brazil) Richarlison (Argentina) Lionel Messi
2022 Qatar	GloboEsporte	(Argentina) Emiliano Martínez	(France) Théo Hernandez (France) Dayot Upamecano (Croatia) Joško Gvardiol (Morocco) Achraf Hakimi	(Argentina) Enzo Fernández (Argentina) Rodrigo De Paul (Croatia) Luka Modrić	(France) Antoine Griezmann (Argentina) Lionel Messi (France) Kylian Mbappé
2022 Qatar	UOL	(Argentina) Emiliano Martínez	(France) Théo Hernandez (France) Dayot Upamecano (Croatia) Joško Gvardiol (Morocco) Achraf Hakimi	(Croatia) Luka Modrić (France) Antoine Griezmann (Argentina) Enzo Fernández	(Argentina) Julián Alvarez (France) Kylian Mbappé (Argentina) Lionel Messi
2022 Qatar	Goal	(Argentina) Emiliano Martínez	(France) Théo Hernandez (Croatia) Joško Gvardiol (Argentina) Nicolás Otamendi (Morocco) Achraf Hakimi	(Argentina) Enzo Fernández (France) Antoine Griezmann (Morocco) Sofyan Amrabat	(France) Kylian Mbappé (Argentina) Julián Alvarez (Argentina) Lionel Messi
2022 Qatar	Kicker	(Argentina) Emiliano Martínez	(France) Théo Hernandez (Morocco) Romain Saïss (Croatia) Joško Gvardiol (Argentina) Nahuel Molina	(France) Antoine Griezmann (Croatia) Luka Modrić (Morocco) Sofyan Amrabat	(France) Kylian Mbappé (Argentina) Julián Alvarez (Argentina) Lionel Messi
2022 Qatar	Der Spiegel	(Argentina) Emiliano Martínez	(France) Théo Hernandez (Croatia) Joško Gvardiol (Argentina) Nicolás Otamendi (Morocco) Achraf Hakimi	(Morocco) Sofyan Amrabat (Germany) Jamal Musiala (Argentina) Enzo Fernández	(France) Kylian Mbappé (France) Antoine Griezmann (Argentina) Lionel Messi
2022 Qatar	RND SportBuzzer	(Croatia) Dominik Livaković	(France) Théo Hernandez (Croatia) Joško Gvardiol (Argentina) Nicolás Otamendi (Morocco) Achraf Hakimi	(Croatia) Luka Modrić (England) Jude Bellingham (Morocco) Sofyan Amrabat	(France) Kylian Mbappé (Argentina) Julián Alvarez (Argentina) Lionel Messi
2022 Qatar	Bleacher Report	(Croatia) Dominik Livaković	(France) Théo Hernandez (Morocco) Romain Saïss (Croatia) Joško Gvardiol (Morocco) Achraf Hakimi	(England) Jude Bellingham (France) Antoine Griezmann (Morocco) Sofyan Amrabat	(France) Kylian Mbappé (France) Olivier Giroud (Argentina) Lionel Messi
2022 Qatar	The Independent	(Croatia) Dominik Livaković	(France) Théo Hernandez (Morocco) Romain Saïss (Croatia) Joško Gvardiol (Morocco) Achraf Hakimi	(Argentina) Alexis Mac Allister (England) Jude Bellingham (Morocco) Sofyan Amrabat (France) Antoine Griezmann	(France) Kylian Mbappé (Argentina) Lionel Messi
2022 Qatar	Radio Times	(Croatia) Dominik Livaković	(France) Théo Hernandez (Morocco) Romain Saïss (Croatia) Joško Gvardiol (Morocco) Achraf Hakimi	(Portugal) Bruno Fernandes (Morocco) Sofyan Amrabat (France) Antoine Griezmann	(France) Kylian Mbappé (France) Olivier Giroud (Argentina) Lionel Messi
2022 Qatar	Diario AS	(Croatia) Dominik Livaković	(France) Théo Hernandez (Croatia) Joško Gvardiol (Brazil) Marquinhos (Morocco) Achraf Hakimi	(France) Aurélien Tchouaméni (Portugal) Bruno Fernandes	(France) Kylian Mbappé (Argentina) Julián Alvarez (France) Antoine Griezmann (Argentina) Lionel Messi
2022 Qatar	Opta Sports	(Croatia) Dominik Livaković	(France) Théo Hernandez (Brazil) Marquinhos (Croatia) Joško Gvardiol (Morocco) Achraf Hakimi	(France) Aurélien Tchouaméni (France) Antoine Griezmann (Portugal) Bruno Fernandes	(Argentina) Lionel Messi (France) Kylian Mbappé (Argentina) Julián Alvarez
2022 Qatar	CBS Sports	(Croatia) Dominik Livaković	(Australia) Aziz Behich (Croatia) Joško Gvardiol (France) Raphaël Varane (Morocco) Achraf Hakimi	(France) Antoine Griezmann (England) Jude Bellingham (Morocco) Sofyan Amrabat	(Argentina) Julián Alvarez (Argentina) Lionel Messi (France) Kylian Mbappé
2022 Qatar	Sky Sports	(Croatia) Dominik Livaković	(Argentina) Marcos Acuña (England) Harry Maguire (Croatia) Joško Gvardiol (Morocco) Achraf Hakimi	(Morocco) Azzedine Ounahi (Morocco) Sofyan Amrabat (France) Antoine Griezmann	(France) Kylian Mbappé (France) Olivier Giroud (Argentina) Lionel Messi
2022 Qatar	L'Équipe	(Croatia) Dominik Livaković	(Argentina) Marcos Acuña (Croatia) Joško Gvardiol (Morocco) Romain Saïss (Morocco) Achraf Hakimi	(Croatia) Luka Modrić (Morocco) Sofyan Amrabat (Argentina) Enzo Fernández	(France) Kylian Mbappé (Argentina) Lionel Messi (England) Bukayo Saka
2022 Qatar	Sofascore	(Croatia) Dominik Livaković	(Netherlands) Daley Blind (England) Harry Maguire (France) Ibrahima Konaté (Croatia) Josip Juranović	(France) Antoine Griezmann (Brazil) Casemiro (Netherlands) Cody Gakpo	(France) Kylian Mbappé (Argentina) Lionel Messi (Portugal) Bruno Fernandes
2022 Qatar	WhoScored.com	(Poland) Wojciech Szczęsny	(France) Théo Hernandez (Spain) Rodri (England) Harry Maguire (Morocco) Achraf Hakimi	(France) Kylian Mbappé (Brazil) Casemiro (England) Jude Bellingham (Portugal) Bruno Fernandes	(France) Antoine Griezmann (Argentina) Lionel Messi
2022 Qatar	Süddeutsche Zeitung	(Morocco) Yassine Bounou	(France) Théo Hernandez (Argentina) Cristian Romero (Morocco) Sofyan Amrabat (Morocco) Achraf Hakimi	(England) Jude Bellingham (France) Antoine Griezmann (Croatia) Luka Modrić	(France) Kylian Mbappé (Argentina) Julián Alvarez (Argentina) Lionel Messi

== Goal of the Tournament ==
The Goal of the Tournament award was awarded for the first time at the 2006 FIFA World Cup.

- Scores and results list the goal tally of the players' team first.

=== Official winners ===
World Cup	Player	Scored against	Score	Minute	Result	Round	Ref.
2006 Germany	(Argentina) Maxi Rodríguez	Mexico	2–1	98' (e.t.)	2–1 (a.e.t.)	Round of 16	
2010 South Africa	(Uruguay) Diego Forlán	Germany	2–1	51'	2–3	Match for third place	
2014 Brazil	(Colombia) James Rodríguez	Uruguay	1–0	28'	2–0	Round of 16	
2018 Russia	(France) Benjamin Pavard	Argentina	2–2	57'	4–3	Round of 16	
2022 Qatar	(Brazil) Richarlison	Serbia	2–0	73'	2–0	Group stage	
2026 Canada–Mexico–United States	(Cape Verde) Sidny Lopes Cabral	Argentina	2–2	103' (e.t.)	2–3 (a.e.t.)	Round of 32	

=== Unofficial winners ===
In 2020 and 2021, FIFA's official YouTube channel made videos of the top ten goals of the following three tournaments.

World Cup	Player	Scored against	Score	Minute	Result	Round	Ref.
1970 Mexico	(Brazil) Carlos Alberto	Italy	4–1	86'	4–1	Final	
1986 Mexico	(Argentina) Diego Maradona	England	2–0	55'	2–1	Quarter-finals	
1990 Italy	(Italy) Roberto Baggio	Czechoslovakia	2–0	78'	2–0	Group stage	

=== Nominees ===
World Cup	Rank	Player	Scored against	Score	Minute	Result	Round	Ref.
2006 Germany	1	(Argentina) Maxi Rodríguez	Mexico	2–1	98' (e.t.)	2–1 (a.e.t.)	Round of 16	
2006 Germany	2	(Argentina) Esteban Cambiasso	Serbia and Montenegro	2–0	31'	6–0	Group stage	
2006 Germany	3	(Argentina) Carlos Tevez	Serbia and Montenegro	5–0	84'	6–0	Group stage	
2006 Germany	4	(Italy) Fabio Grosso	Germany	1–0	119' (e.t.)	2–0 (a.e.t.)	Semi-finals	
2006 Germany	5	(England) Joe Cole	Sweden	1–0	64'	2–2	Group stage	
2006 Germany	6	(Germany) Philipp Lahm	Costa Rica	1–0	6'	4–2	Group stage	
2006 Germany	6	(Germany) Torsten Frings	Costa Rica	4–1	87'	4–2	Group stage	
2006 Germany	6	(Argentina) Maxi Rodríguez	Serbia and Montenegro	1–0	6'	6–0	Group stage	
2006 Germany	9	(Germany) Bastian Schweinsteiger	Portugal	1–0	56'	3–1	Match for third place	
2006 Germany	10	(England) Steven Gerrard	Trinidad and Tobago	2–0	90+5'	2–0	Group stage	
2010 South Africa	1	(Uruguay) Diego Forlán	Germany	2–1	51'	2–3	Match for third place	
2010 South Africa	2	(Netherlands) Giovanni van Bronckhorst	Uruguay	1–0	18'	3–2	Semi-finals	
2010 South Africa	3	(Germany) Mesut Özil	Ghana	1–0	60'	1–0	Group stage	
2010 South Africa	4	(Argentina) Carlos Tevez	Mexico	3–0	52'	3–1	Round of 16	
2010 South Africa	5	(Uruguay) Luis Suárez	South Korea	2–1	80'	2–1	Round of 16	
2010 South Africa	6	(South Africa) Siphiwe Tshabalala	Mexico	1–0	55'	1–1	Group stage	
2010 South Africa	7	(Italy) Fabio Quagliarella	Slovakia	2–3	90+2'	2–3	Group stage	
2010 South Africa	8	(Germany) Lukas Podolski	England	2–0	32'	4–1	Round of 16	
2010 South Africa	9	(Ghana) Sulley Muntari	Uruguay	1–0	45+1'	1–1 (a.e.t.) (2–4 p)	Quarter-finals	
2010 South Africa	10	(Argentina) Gabriel Heinze	Nigeria	1–0	6'	1–0	Group stage	
2014 Brazil	1	(Colombia) James Rodríguez	Uruguay	1–0	28'	2–0	Round of 16	
2014 Brazil	2	(Netherlands) Robin van Persie	Spain	1–1	44'	5–1	Group stage	
2014 Brazil	3	(Colombia) James Rodríguez	Japan	4–1	90'	4–1	Group stage	
2014 Brazil	4	(Germany) Mario Götze	Argentina	1–0	113' (e.t.)	1–0 (a.e.t.)	Final	
2014 Brazil	5	(Brazil) David Luiz	Colombia	2–0	69'	2–1	Quarter-finals	
2014 Brazil	6	(Australia) Tim Cahill	Netherlands	1–1	21'	2–3	Group stage	
2014 Brazil	7	(Spain) David Villa	Australia	1–0	36'	3–0	Group stage	
2014 Brazil	8	(Argentina) Lionel Messi	Bosnia and Herzegovina	2–0	65'	2–1	Group stage	
2014 Brazil	9	(Argentina) Lionel Messi	Nigeria	2–1	45+1'	3–2	Group stage	
2014 Brazil	10	(Switzerland) Xherdan Shaqiri	Honduras	1–0	6'	3–0	Group stage	
2018 Russia	1	(France) Benjamin Pavard	Argentina	2–2	57'	4–3	Round of 16	
2018 Russia	2	(Colombia) Juan Fernando Quintero	Japan	1–1	39'	1–2	Group stage	
2018 Russia	3	(Croatia) Luka Modrić	Argentina	2–0	80'	3–0	Group stage	
2018 Russia	4	(Portugal) Cristiano Ronaldo	Spain	3–3	88'	3–3	Group stage	
2018 Russia	5	(Argentina) Lionel Messi	Nigeria	1–0	14'	2–1	Group stage	
2018 Russia	6	(Russia) Denis Cheryshev	Croatia	1–0	31'	2–2 (a.e.t.) (3–4 p)	Quarter-finals	
2018 Russia	7	(Belgium) Nacer Chadli	Japan	3–2	90+4'	3–2	Round of 16	
2018 Russia	8	(Nigeria) Ahmed Musa	Iceland	2–0	75'	2–0	Group stage	
2018 Russia	9	(Portugal) Ricardo Quaresma	Iran	1–0	45'	1–1	Group stage	
2018 Russia	10	(Germany) Toni Kroos	Sweden	2–1	90+5'	2–1	Group stage	
2018 Russia	Unranked	(Russia) Denis Cheryshev	Saudi Arabia	2–0	43'	5–0	Group stage	
2018 Russia	Unranked	(Russia) Artem Dzyuba	Egypt	2–0	62'	3–1	Group stage	
2018 Russia	Unranked	(Spain) Nacho	Portugal	3–2	58'	3–3	Group stage	
2018 Russia	Unranked	(Brazil) Philippe Coutinho	Switzerland	1–0	20'	1–1	Group stage	
2018 Russia	Unranked	(Belgium) Dries Mertens	Panama	1–0	47'	3–0	Group stage	
2018 Russia	Unranked	(England) Jesse Lingard	Panama	3–0	36'	6–1	Group stage	
2018 Russia	Unranked	(Belgium) Adnan Januzaj	England	1–0	51'	1–0	Group stage	
2018 Russia	Unranked	(Argentina) Ángel Di María	France	1–1	41'	3–4	Round of 16	
2022 Qatar	1	(Brazil) Richarlison	Serbia	2–0	73'	2–0	Group stage	
2022 Qatar	Unranked	(Saudi Arabia) Salem Al-Dawsari	Argentina	2–1	53'	2–1	Group stage	
2022 Qatar	Unranked	(Netherlands) Cody Gakpo	Ecuador	1–0	6'	1–1	Group stage	
2022 Qatar	Unranked	(Argentina) Enzo Fernández	Mexico	2–0	87'	2–0	Group stage	
2022 Qatar	Unranked	(Cameroon) Vincent Aboubakar	Serbia	2–3	63'	3–3	Group stage	
2022 Qatar	Unranked	(Mexico) Luis Chávez	Saudi Arabia	2–0	52'	2–1	Group stage	
2022 Qatar	Unranked	(France) Kylian Mbappé	Poland	3–0	90+1'	3–1	Round of 16	
2022 Qatar	Unranked	(Brazil) Richarlison	South Korea	3–0	29'	4–1	Round of 16	
2022 Qatar	Unranked	(South Korea) Paik Seung-ho	Brazil	1–4	76'	1–4	Round of 16	
2022 Qatar	Unranked	(Brazil) Neymar	Croatia	1–0	105+1' (e.t.)	1–1 (a.e.t.) (2–4 p)	Quarter-finals	
2026 Canada–Mexico–United States	1	(Cape Verde) Sidny Lopes Cabral	Argentina	2–2	103' (e.t.)	2–3 (a.e.t.)	Round of 32	
2026 Canada–Mexico–United States	2	(Uzbekistan) Eldor Shomurodov	DR Congo	1–0	10'	1–3	Group stage	
2026 Canada–Mexico–United States	3	(Haiti) Wilson Isidor	Morocco	2–1	43'	2–4	Group stage	
2026 Canada–Mexico–United States	Unranked	(Bosnia and Herzegovina) Kerim Alajbegović	Qatar	1–0	29'	3–1	Group stage	
2026 Canada–Mexico–United States	Unranked	(Argentina) Julián Alvarez	Switzerland	2–1	112' (e.t.)	3–1 (a.e.t.)	Quarter-finals	
2026 Canada–Mexico–United States	Unranked	(England) Jude Bellingham	France	6–4	90+8'	6–4	Match for third place	
2026 Canada–Mexico–United States	Unranked	(Norway) Erling Haaland	Brazil	2–0	90'	2–1	Round of 16	
2026 Canada–Mexico–United States	Unranked	(New Zealand) Elijah Just	Iran	1–0	7'	2–2	Group stage	
2026 Canada–Mexico–United States	Unranked	(Japan) Daizen Maeda	Sweden	1–0	56'	1–1	Group stage	
2026 Canada–Mexico–United States	Unranked	(France) Kylian Mbappé	Senegal	3–1	90+6'	3–1	Group stage	
2026 Canada–Mexico–United States	Unranked	(Argentina) Lionel Messi	Algeria	1–0	17'	3–0	Group stage	
2026 Canada–Mexico–United States	Unranked	(Spain) Ferran Torres	Argentina	1–0	106' (e.t.)	1–0 (a.e.t.)	Final	

== See also ==
- FIFA Women's World Cup awards
- UEFA European Championship awards
- Copa América awards
- Africa Cup of Nations awards
- AFC Asian Cup awards
- CONCACAF Gold Cup awards
- OFC Men's Nations Cup awards
