= Martín Delgado =

Martín Delgado may refer to:

- Martín Teófilo Delgado (1858–1918), Filipino military leader
- Martín Delgado (football manager) (born 1949), Spanish football manager

== See also ==
- Mario Martín Delgado (born 1972), Mexican politician
