= Martín Delgado (football manager) =

Spanish football manager (born 1949)

Personal information
- Full name: Juan José Martín-Delgado Muñiz
- Date of birth: 13 December 1949 (age 76)
- Place of birth: Toledo, Spain

Managerial career
- Years: Team
- Getafe (youth)
- Real Madrid (youth)
- 1997–1998: Real Madrid (assistant)
- 1999–2000: Benfica (assistant)
- 2001–2003: Athletic Bilbao (assistant)
- 2004: Leganés
- 2005: Alavés B
- 2005: Castellón
- 2008–2009: Colonia Ofigevi

Juan José Martín-Delgado Muñiz (born 13 December 1949), known as Martín Delgado, is a Spanish football manager.

== Managerial career ==
Born in Toledo, Castile-La Mancha, Martín Delgado started working in Getafe CF's youth categories before moving to Real Madrid. After the arrival of Jupp Heynckes, he was appointed assistant manager of the main squad.

Martín Delgado subsequently followed Heynckes at S.L. Benfica and Athletic Bilbao, both as an assistant. On 5 February 2004, he was named manager of Segunda División side CD Leganés, but failed to retain its division status and was subsequently sacked.

On 8 January 2005, Martín Delgado was appointed at the helm of Deportivo Alavés B, in Segunda División B. On 30 June, after taking the club to a comfortable mid-position, he resigned and was named manager of CD Castellón in the second tier, replacing fired Álvaro Cervera.

On 30 October 2005, after achieving only one win out of ten matches, Martín Delgado was relieved from his duties. He only returned to action in December 2008, after being appointed at CD Colonia Ofigevi.
