= Achraf Hakimi =

Professional footballer (born 1998)

- Hakimi with Morocco in 2026

Personal information
- Birth name: Achraf Hakimi Mouh
- Date of birth: 4 November 1998 (age 28)
- Place of birth: Madrid, Spain
- Height: 1.81 m (5 ft 11 in)
- Position: Right-back

Team information
- Current team: Paris Saint-Germain
- Number: 2

Youth career
- 2005–2006: Colonia Ofigevi
- 2006–2016: Real Madrid

Senior career*
Years	Team	Apps	(Gls)
2016–2017	Real Madrid B	28	(1)
2017–2020	Real Madrid	9	(2)
2018–2020	→ Borussia Dortmund (loan)	54	(7)
2020–2021	Inter Milan	37	(7)
2021–	Paris Saint-Germain	137	(22)

International career^{‡}
2015	Morocco U20	8	(0)
2019	Morocco U23	2	(0)
2024	Morocco Olympic (O.P.)	6	(2)
2016–	Morocco	104	(14)
Medal record
Men's football
Representing Morocco
Africa Cup of Nations
Winner	2025 Morocco
Olympic Games
Third place	2024 Paris	Team
- * Club domestic league appearances and goals as of 19:30, 21 November 2026 (UTC) ‡ National team caps and goals as of 21:04, 13 November 2026 (UTC)

Achraf Hakimi Mouh (Note: Arabic: أشرف حكيمي, romanized: Ashraf Ḥakīmī, pronounced [ˈʔaʃraf ħaˈkiːmiː ˈmuːħ]) (born 4 November 1998) is a professional footballer who plays as a right-back for Ligue 1 club Paris Saint-Germain. Born in Spain, he plays for and captains the Morocco national team. Known for his attacking prowess and strong defensive contribution, he is widely regarded as one of the best right-backs of all time, and is the African player with the most European titles.

At club level, Hakimi began playing for Real Madrid Castilla in 2016 and was promoted to the first team in 2017, where he won the UEFA Champions League and the FIFA Club World Cup. He was sent on a two-year loan deal to Bundesliga side Borussia Dortmund, winning the DFL-Supercup in 2019. He then signed with Serie A side Inter Milan, helping the club win the 2020–21 Serie A title, their first league title in 11 years. Paris Saint-Germain then signed him in 2021 for a reported fee of €68 million. With PSG, he won five Ligue 1 titles and two Coupes de France, and was integral to the club winning their first UEFA Champions League titles back-to-back in 2025 and 2026, with the former being part of a continental treble.

Born in Spain, Hakimi was capped by Morocco at the under-20 level, before making his senior international debut in 2016 at 17 years old. He was chosen in Morocco's squads for three FIFA World Cups (in 2018, 2022, and 2026), four Africa Cup of Nations (in 2019, 2021, 2023, and 2025), and was one of three overage players selected for the 2024 Summer Olympics team. At the 2022 World Cup, he and Morocco made history by becoming the first African nation to reach the semi-finals. He later won with the team its second Africa Cup of Nations title in 2025.

Hakimi ranked 6th in the 2025 Ballon d'Or, the highest position ever achieved by a Moroccan player. He was also named the 2025 African Player of the Year, becoming the fifth Moroccan recipient of the award and the first since Mustapha Hadji in 1998.

== Early life ==
Hakimi was born on 4 November 1998, in Madrid, Spain, to Moroccan parents. His father Mohamed, from Oued Zem, worked as a street vendor, and his mother Saida, from Ksar el-Kebir, was a housewife. Hakimi grew up in Getafe belonging to the Community of Madrid, where his family faced economic challenges. At the age of 8, Hakimi joined CD Colonia Ofigevi, a local football club, where he began his football journey. His talent was quickly noticed, and in 2006, he joined Real Madrid's youth academy. He spent several years developing his skills in the academy, initially playing as a winger before transitioning to his more familiar role as a right-back. Hakimi has stated that although he was raised in Spain, he grew up in a household shaped by Arab and Muslim culture, which later influenced his decision to represent Morocco at international level.

== Club career ==
=== Real Madrid ===
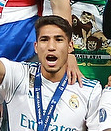
Hakimi after winning the 2017–18 UEFA Champions League with Real Madrid

Hakimi made his debut for Real Madrid in the first match of the 2016 International Champions Cup, a 3–1 loss against Paris Saint-Germain. He subsequently returned to the B team, making his senior debut on 20 August 2016 by starting in a 3–2 Segunda División B home win against Real Sociedad B.

Hakimi scored his first senior goal on 25 September 2016, netting the equalizer in a 1–1 draw at Fuenlabrada.

On 19 August 2017, Hakimi was promoted to the main squad as a backup to Dani Carvajal and Nacho, and was assigned the number 19 jersey. He made his first team – and La Liga – debut on 1 October, starting in a 2–0 home win over Espanyol. He scored his first La Liga goal on 9 December 2017 in a 5–0 win against Sevilla. On 12 May 2018, he scored his second goal against Celta Vigo in a 6–0 win. In the 2017–18 UEFA Champions League, he made two appearances under the age of 18 as Madrid won the title, their third consecutive and 13th overall. He thus became the first Moroccan to win the European Cup/UEFA Champions League and the third Moroccan player to reach the final, after Redouane Hajry and Mehdi Benatia.

==== Loan to Borussia Dortmund ====
On 11 July 2018, Hakimi signed for Bundesliga club Borussia Dortmund on a two-year loan deal. He scored his first goal for the club in a 7–0 victory over 1. FC Nürnberg on 27 September. He provided three assists in a single match for the first time in his career against Atlético Madrid, in his first Champions League appearance for Dortmund. Hakimi scored a brace against Slavia Prague in the group stage of the Champions League on 2 October 2019, his first goals in the competition. On 5 November 2019, Hakimi scored another brace in the second half to turn a 0–2 deficit against Inter Milan to a 3–2 win at the Westfalenstadion.

In February 2020, Hakimi set a Bundesliga speed record when he was clocked at 36.48 km/h (22.67 mph) in a match against the Union Berlin, beating the old league record which he had set against RB Leipzig three months prior at 36.2 km/h (22.5 mph). On 31 May, after scoring in the club's 6–1 away win over SC Paderborn, he removed his shirt to reveal a shirt with the message "Justice for George Floyd". His teammate, Jadon Sancho, revealed a similar shirt after scoring as well.

=== Inter Milan ===
On 2 July 2020, Hakimi signed for Serie A club Inter Milan on a five-year contract, with a reported fee of around €40 million. He made his debut on 26 September and provided an assist in a 4–3 win against Fiorentina in the Serie A. He scored his first goal for the club in the subsequent league game against Benevento, which Inter won 5–2.

=== Paris Saint-Germain ===
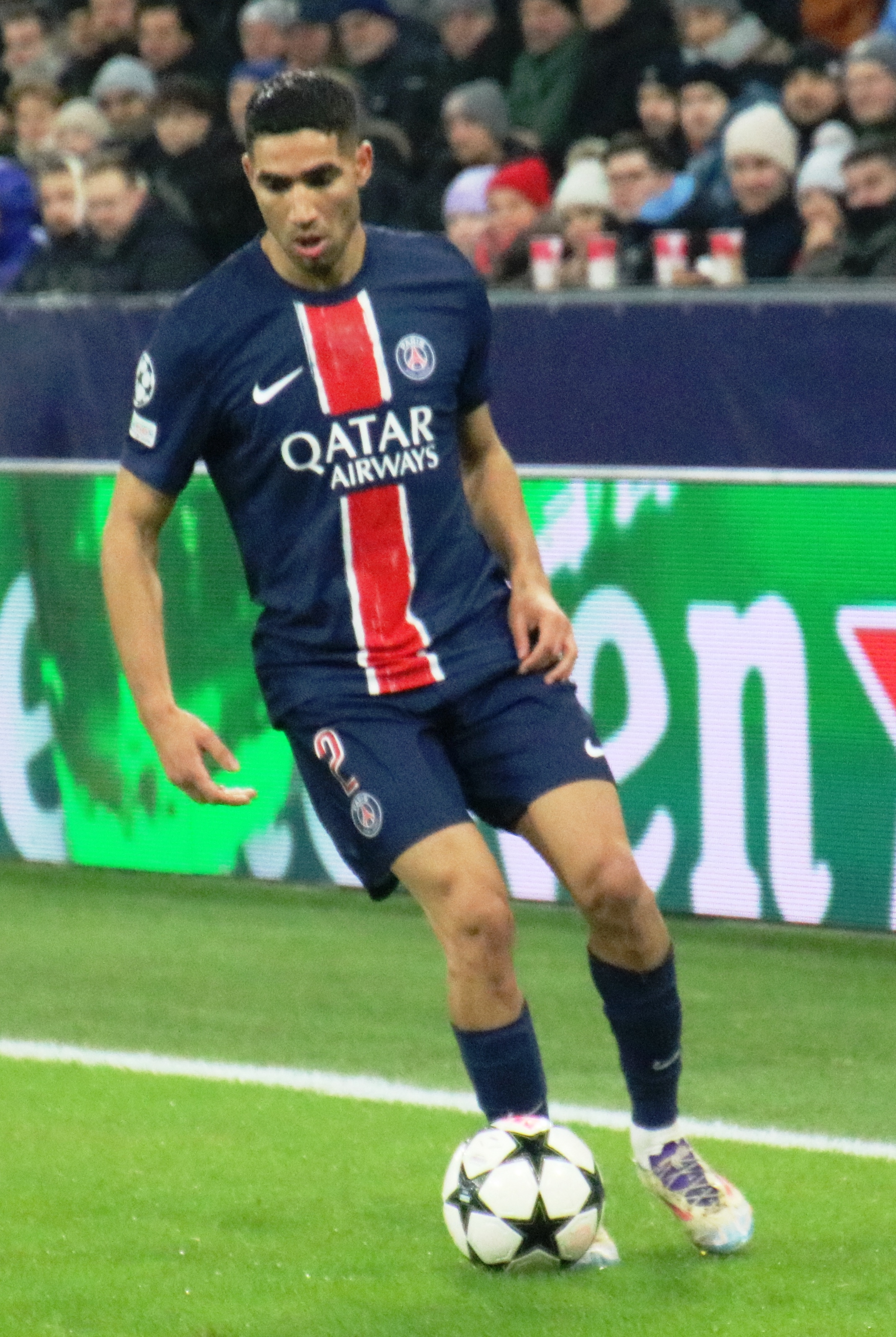
Hakimi in a 2024 Champions League match with Paris Saint-Germain

Hakimi signed for Ligue 1 club Paris Saint-Germain (PSG) on 6 July 2021 on a five-year contract. The transfer fee paid by PSG was reported by The Guardian to be an initial €60 million, potentially rising by €11 million in add-ons. Hakimi made his Ligue 1 debut on 7 August, playing the entire ninety minutes and scoring his first goal for the club against Troyes. He received his first red card in a 0–0 draw against Marseille on 24 August. On 22 September, Hakimi scored twice in a 2–1 victory against Metz. In his first season at PSG, he won a Ligue 1 title, his second league title in a row.

On 14 February 2023, Hakimi was nominated for the 2022 FIFA FIFPRO World 11. On 19 September 2023, Hakimi scored a goal in a 2–0 victory against his former club Dortmund in the 2023–24 UEFA Champions League, thus earning a spot on the UEFA's Team of Week. In October 2023, together with PSG players Randal Kolo Muani, Ousmane Dembélé and Layvin Kurzawa, Hakimi was handed a one-match suspension for participating in offensive chants following a victory against rivals Marseille. On 1 November 2023, Hakimi was nominated for the 2023 African Footballer of the Year by CAF. On 24 October 2024, Hakimi along with his international teammate Soufiane Rahimi, were nominated for the 2024 African Footballer of the Year award.

On 8 February 2025, Hakimi extended his contract with Paris Saint-Germain until 2029. On 7 May 2025, Hakimi scored PSG's second goal in a 2–1 win over Arsenal in the second leg of the Champions League semi-final, securing their place in the final for the second time in the competition's history. On 24 May, he netted a goal in a 3–0 win over Reims in the Coupe de France final. On 31 May, he opened the scoring in the Champions League final, contributing to a dominant 5–0 victory over his former club Inter Milan, becoming PSG's first Champions League final goalscorer. He became the second Moroccan to play a European Cup/Champions League final (after Hajry Redouane in 1988 with Benfica), the first Moroccan (and seventh African) to score in a European Cup/Champions League final, and the second Moroccan ever (after Ayoub El Kaabi in the 2024 Europa Conference League final) to score in an UEFA club competition final. Hakimi's performances across the season led to him emerging as a contender for the 2025 Ballon d'Or.

In the 2025–26 season, Hakimi won both the Ligue 1 title and the UEFA Champions League after a penalty shootout victory over Arsenal in the final. The latter marked his third Champions League title, equaling Samuel Eto'o's record for the most titles won by an African player. It was also the 19th major trophy of his career, surpassing the totals of both Eto'o and Yaya Touré to become the most decorated African footballer in history.

On 30 October 2026, Hakimi scored his first career hat-trick and provided two assists in a 5–1 victory against Le Havre AC.

== International career ==
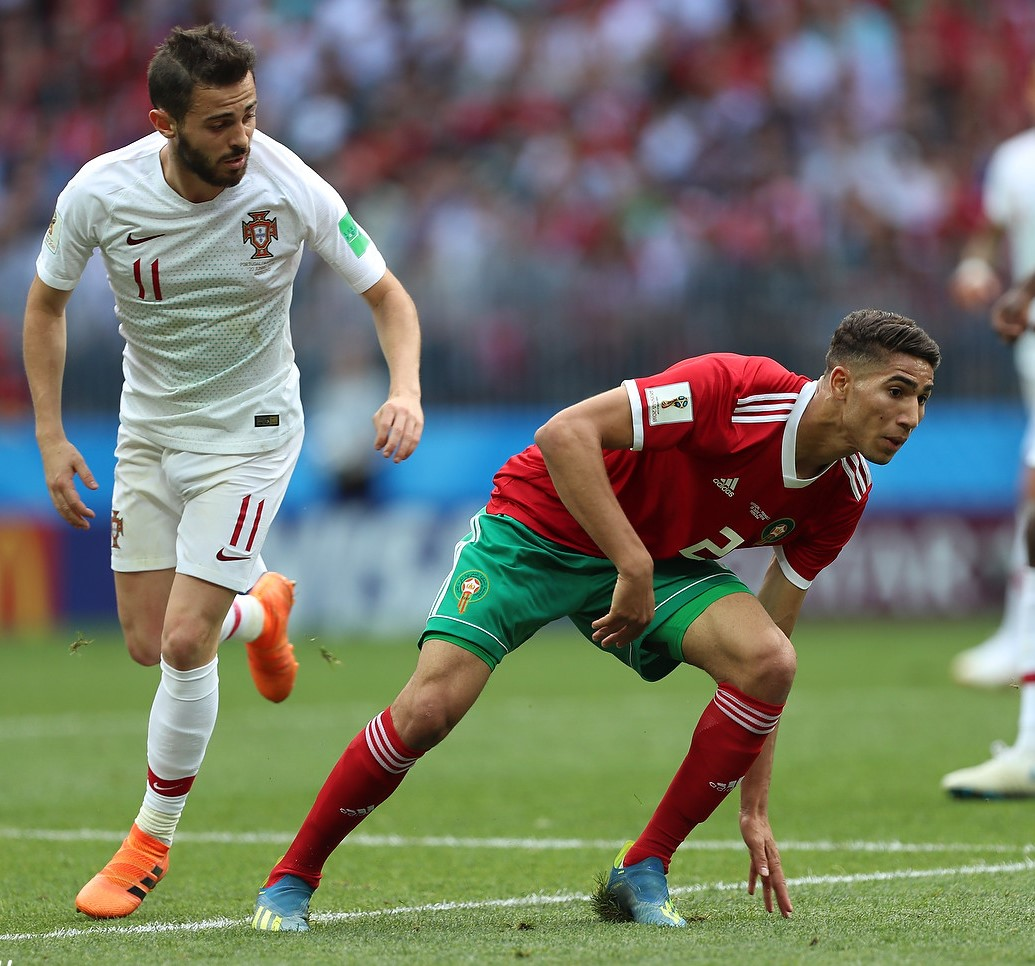
Hakimi (right) vs Portugal's Bernardo Silva (left) at the 2018 FIFA World Cup

After representing Morocco at under-17 and under-20 levels, Hakimi made his debut for the under-23s on 5 June 2016, in a 1–0 friendly win over Cameroon U23s. He made his full international debut on 11 October 2016, coming on as a substitute for Fouad Chafik in a 4–0 win against Canada. He scored his first international goal on 1 September 2017, netting the fourth in a 6–0 home routing of Mali.

In May 2018, he was named in Morocco's preliminary squad for the 2018 FIFA World Cup and on 4 June he was named in the final 23-man squad for the tournament.

Hakimi was also called up for the 2021 Africa Cup of Nations in Cameroon. He started all of his matches in the group stages. He scored from a free kick in a 2–2 draw against Gabon. He started in the round of 16 against Malawi, scoring a free kick in the 70th minute to earn his team a 2–1 victory.

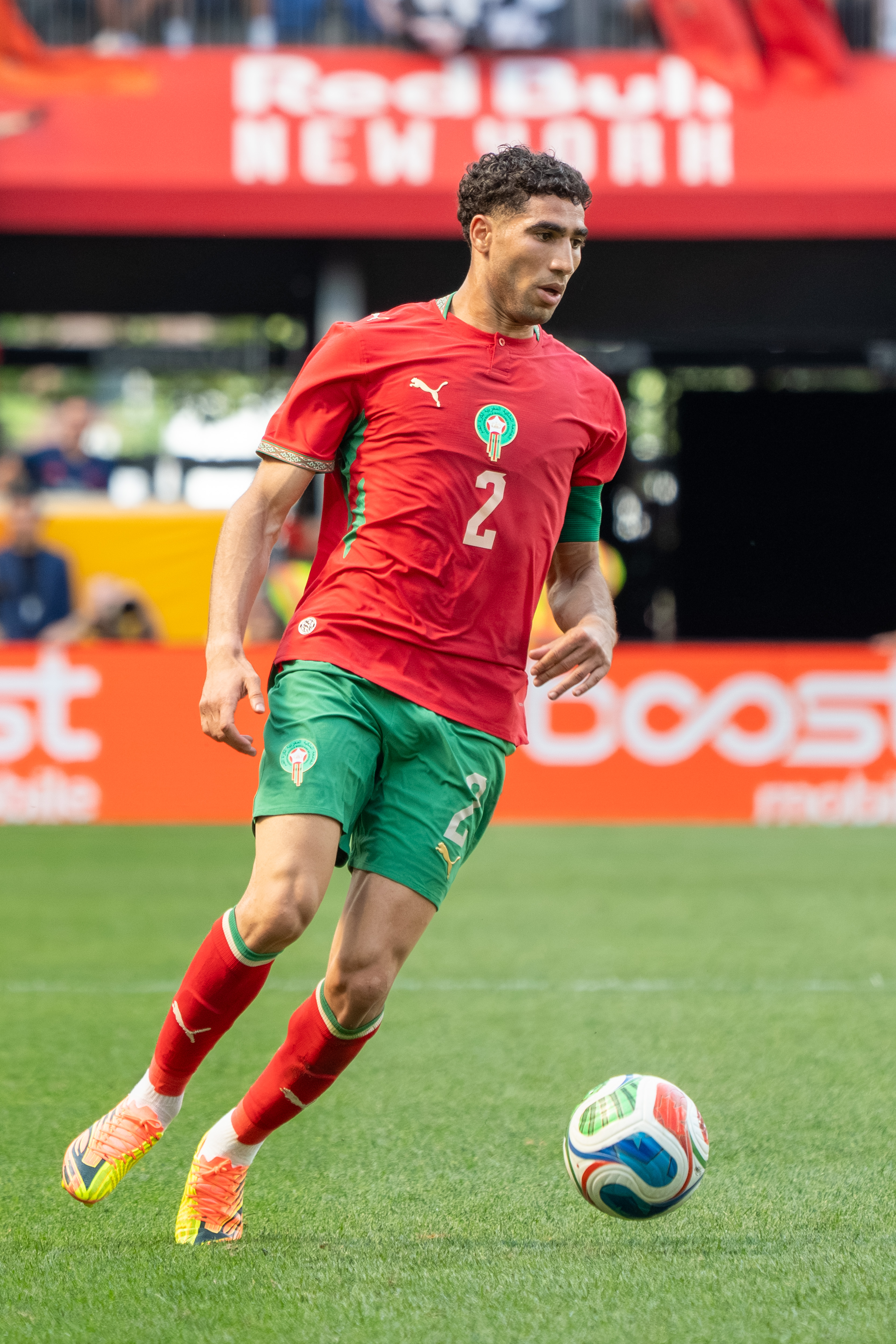
Hakimi with Morocco in 2026

On 10 November 2022, Hakimi was named in Morocco's 26-man squad for the 2022 FIFA World Cup in Qatar. He scored the winning penalty with a panenka style shot in a shoot-out against Spain (his birth country) in the round of 16, securing a place for his country in the quarter-finals and ultimately paving the way for his team to reach the semi-finals of the competition as the first African nation to do so in history. Morocco was also the first Arab country to reach the semi-finals, and the second Muslim one after Turkey in 2002.

On 28 December 2023, Hakimi was amongst the 27 players selected by coach Walid Regragui to represent Morocco in the 2023 Africa Cup of Nations in Ivory Coast. He scored a goal in a 1–1 group stage draw against DR Congo. In the round of 16, he missed a penalty in a 2–0 loss to South Africa.

On 4 July 2024, Hakimi was included in the Moroccan Olympic football team for the 2024 Olympics in France as one of their three overage players and was selected as captain for the team. He recorded an assist and a goal in victories against Iraq and the United States respectively. He scored again in Morocco's 6–0 win over Egypt in the bronze medal match. In May 2025, Achraf Hakimi was the favorite for the RFI "Marc-Vivien Foé" prize, which he ended up winning.

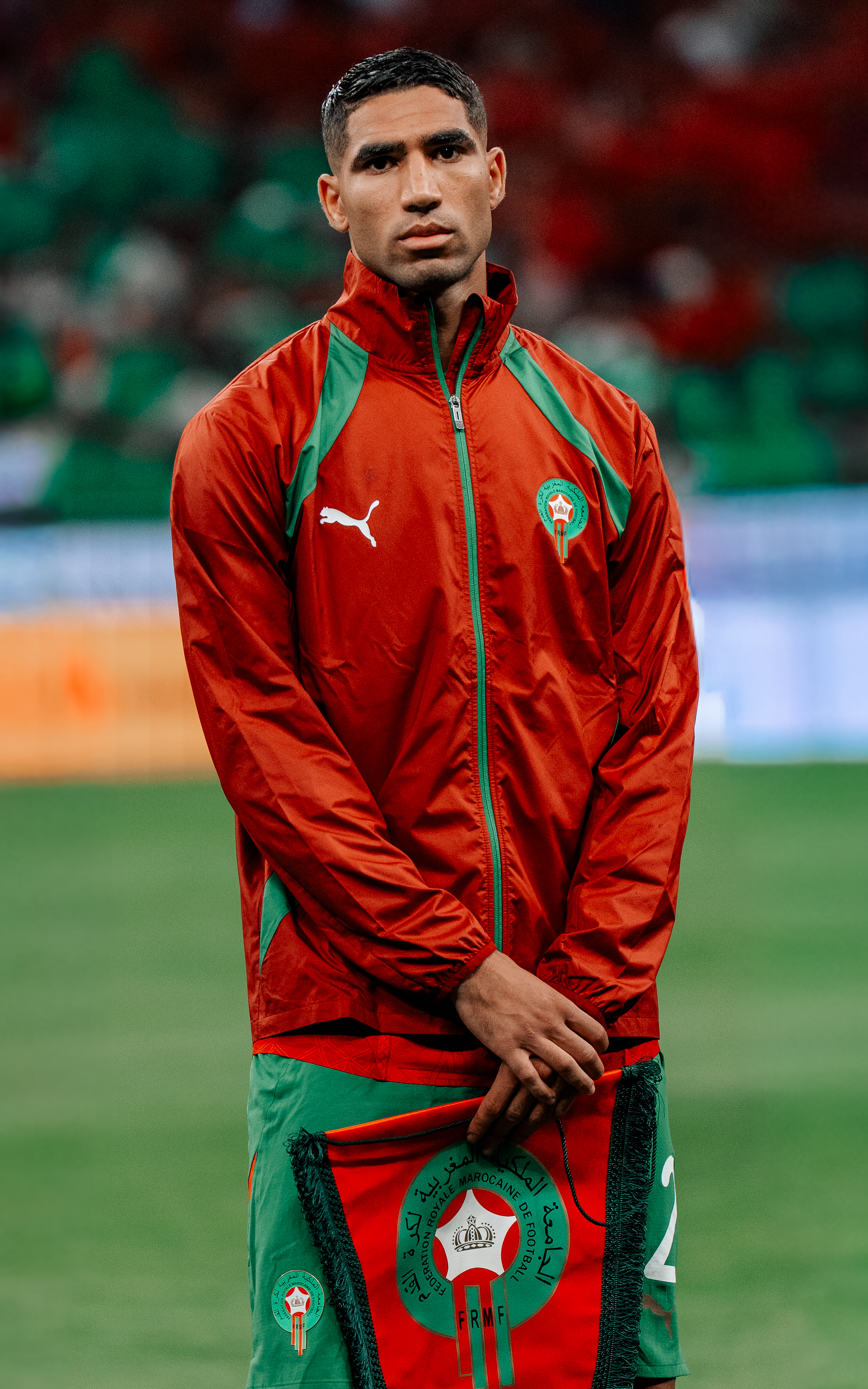
Hakimi with Morocco in 2025

In October 2025, Hakimi's Morocco broke the world record for the longest winning streak in international football, surpassing Spain's previous mark of 15 consecutive victories. With a 1–0 win over Congo in Rabat, they extended their unbeaten run to 16 in all competitions, including World Cup qualifiers and friendlies.

Despite carrying an injury, he was named in Morocco's squad for the 2025 Africa Cup of Nations, which was hosted on home soil. On 4 January 2026, he provided the assist for the only goal in a 1–0 victory over Tanzania in the round of 16. Hakimi made international news on 18 January 2026 when he was penalized by the CAF with a two-match suspension for unsporting conduct during the final. Hakimi and teammate Ismael Saibari had blocked attempts to give Senegalese goalkeeper Édouard Mendy a towel for his gloves, while also helping ball boys steal towels from behind the goal during the rainy AFCON final against Senegal. One of the match sanctions was suspended for one year from date of the decision.

On 26 May 2026, Hakimi was selected in the 26-man squad for the 2026 FIFA World Cup. He made his eleventh World Cup appearance in a 1–1 opening draw against Brazil, becoming the Moroccan player with the most appearances in the competition, breaking the tie with Hakim Ziyech. He went on to make his twelfth appearance in a 1–0 victory over Scotland, becoming the African player with the most appearances in World Cup history, surpassing the previous record held by François Omam-Biyik and Asamoah Gyan. On 24 June, he netted his first World Cup goal, provided an assist and was named Man of the Match in a 4–2 victory over Haiti. On 29 June, he earned his 100th international cap for Morocco in their Round of 32 victory over the Netherlands, winning 3–2 on penalties after a 1–1 draw, becoming only the second Moroccan player to reach the milestone after Noureddine Naybet. On July 4, he set up the provided an assist in the World Cup match against Canada, that ended in a 3–0 victory over Canada, helping the team qualify for the quarter-finals for the second consecutive time a first for an African national team.

== Player profile ==
Upon signing for Borussia Dortmund, Hakimi was described as a right-sided attacking full-back or wing-back who had previously trained as a winger and could also play as a defender. His playing style included speed, physical strength, tactical awareness, technical ability, and the capacity to play long passes from defense. Some sources have referred to him as one of the best right-backs in the world.

=== Reception ===
Following Hakimi's performances at the 2022 FIFA World Cup in Qatar, a football stadium in Ksar el-Kebir was named after him. He was named Arab Sportsman of the Year for 2022 at the Joy Awards in Riyadh. On 12 October 2023, Hakimi, Didier Drogba, Mikel John Obi and Sadio Mané were selected as draw assistants for the final draw of the 2023 Africa Cup of Nations.

== Personal life ==
=== Marriage and children ===
Hakimi was married to Spanish actress of Tunisian descent Hiba Abouk from 2020 until 2023. The couple have two sons, born in 2020 and 2022. On 27 March 2023, Abouk released a statement on her Instagram account confirming that the couple had previously separated, and that they were awaiting divorce proceedings. It was reported that Abouk requested more than half of Hakimi's assets and fortune, although the assets are allegedly held in his mother's name.

=== Legal issues ===
On 3 March 2023, Hakimi was indicted by an investigating judge in Paris over an allegation of rape of a 24-year-old woman, and placed under judicial supervision. He was banned from contacting his alleged victim but allowed to leave French territory. Hakimi's lawyer, Fanny Colin, has stated that his client strongly denies these allegations. On 19 June 2026, an appeals court in France announced that Hakimi would face charges for rape. France's highest court in criminal matters rejected Hakimi's appeal on 23 September 2026, upholding the decision that the footballer will stand trial for rape.

== Career statistics ==
=== Club ===
As of match played 21 November 2026

Appearances and goals by club, season and competition
Club	Season	League			National cup (Note: Includes Copa del Rey, DFB-Pokal, Coppa Italia, Coupe de France)		Europe		Other		Total	
Club	Season	Division	Apps	Goals	Apps	Goals	Apps	Goals	Apps	Goals	Apps	Goals
Real Madrid Castilla	2016–17	Segunda División B	28	1	—		—		—		28	1
Real Madrid	2017–18	La Liga	9	2	5	0	2 (Note: Appearances in UEFA Champions League)	0	1 (Note: Appearance in FIFA Club World Cup)	0	17	2
Borussia Dortmund (loan)	2018–19	Bundesliga	21	2	2	1	5	0	—		28	3
Borussia Dortmund (loan)	2019–20	Bundesliga	33	5	3	0	8	4	1 (Note: Appearance in DFL-Supercup)	0	45	9
Borussia Dortmund (loan)	Total		54	7	5	1	13	4	1	0	73	12
Inter Milan	2020–21	Serie A	37	7	3	0	5	0	—		45	7
Paris Saint-Germain	2021–22	Ligue 1	32	4	0	0	8	0	1 (Note: Appearance in Trophée des Champions)	0	41	4
Paris Saint-Germain	2022–23	Ligue 1	28	5	2	0	8	0	1	0	39	5
Paris Saint-Germain	2023–24	Ligue 1	25	4	3	0	11	1	1	0	40	5
Paris Saint-Germain	2024–25	Ligue 1	25	4	5	1	17	4	8 (Note: One appearance in Trophée des Champions, seven appearances and two goals in FIFA Club World Cup)	2	55	11
Paris Saint-Germain	2025–26	Ligue 1	18	2	0	0	13	1	1 (Note: Appearance in UEFA Super Cup)	0	32	3
Paris Saint-Germain	2026–27	Ligue 1	9	3	0	0	4	0	2 (Note: One appearance in UEFA Super Cup, one appearance in Trophée des Champions)	0	15	3
Paris Saint-Germain	Total		137	22	10	1	61	6	14	2	222	31
Career total			265	39	23	2	81	10	16	2	385	53

=== International ===
As of match played 13 November 2026

Appearances and goals by national team and year
National team	Year	Apps	Goals
Morocco	2016	1	0
Morocco	2017	5	1
Morocco	2018	12	0
Morocco	2019	10	1
Morocco	2020	4	1
Morocco	2021	9	2
Morocco	2022	20	3
Morocco	2023	7	0
Morocco	2024	14	2
Morocco	2025	7	1
Morocco	2026	15	3
Total		104	14

As of match played 13 November 2026
Morocco score listed first, score column indicates score after each Hakimi goal.

List of international goals scored by Achraf Hakimi
No.	Date	Venue	Cap	Opponent	Score	Result	Competition	Ref.
1	1 September 2017	Prince Moulay Abdellah Stadium, Rabat, Morocco	2	Mali	4–0	6–0	2018 FIFA World Cup qualification	
2	19 November 2019	Intwari Stadium, Bujumbura, Burundi	28	Burundi	3–0	3–0	2021 Africa Cup of Nations qualification	
3	13 November 2020	Stade Mohammed V, Casablanca, Morocco	31	Central African Republic	1–0	4–1	2021 Africa Cup of Nations qualification	
4	12 June 2021	Prince Moulay Abdellah Stadium, Rabat, Morocco	36	Burkina Faso	1–0	1–0	Friendly	
5	6 October 2021	Prince Moulay Abdellah Stadium, Rabat, Morocco	38	Guinea-Bissau	1–0	5–0	2022 FIFA World Cup qualification	
6	18 January 2022	Ahmadou Ahidjo Stadium, Yaoundé, Cameroon	44	Gabon	2–2	2–2	2021 Africa Cup of Nations	
7	25 January 2022	Ahmadou Ahidjo Stadium, Yaoundé, Cameroon	45	Malawi	2–1	2–1	2021 Africa Cup of Nations	
8	29 March 2022	Stade Mohammed V, Casablanca, Morocco	48	DR Congo	4–0	4–1	2022 FIFA World Cup qualification	
9	21 January 2024	Laurent Pokou Stadium, San-Pédro, Ivory Coast	71	DR Congo	1–0	1–1	2023 Africa Cup of Nations	
10	12 October 2024	Honor Stadium, Oujda, Morocco	80	Central African Republic	3–0	5–0	2025 Africa Cup of Nations qualification	
11	6 June 2025	Fez Stadium, Fez, Morocco	84	Tunisia	1–0	2–0	Friendly	
12	24 June 2026	Mercedes-Benz Stadium, Atlanta, United States	99	Haiti	1–1	4–2	2026 FIFA World Cup	
13	13 November 2026	Stade Mohammed V, Casablanca, Morocco	104	Niger	2–0	5–1	2027 Africa Cup of Nations qualification	
14	13 November 2026	Stade Mohammed V, Casablanca, Morocco	104	Niger	3–1	5–1	2027 Africa Cup of Nations qualification	

== Honours ==
Real Madrid Castilla

- Copa del Rey Juvenil: 2017

Real Madrid

- Supercopa de España: 2017
- UEFA Champions League: 2017–18
- UEFA Super Cup: 2017
- FIFA Club World Cup: 2017

Borussia Dortmund

- DFL-Supercup: 2019

Inter Milan

- Serie A: 2020–21

Paris Saint-Germain

- Ligue 1: 2021–22, 2022–23, 2023–24, 2024–25, 2025–26
- Coupe de France: 2023–24, 2024–25
- Trophée des Champions: 2022, 2023, 2024
- UEFA Champions League: 2024–25, 2025–26
- UEFA Super Cup: 2025, 2026
- FIFA Club World Cup runner-up: 2025

Morocco Olympic

- Olympic Bronze Medal: 2024

Morocco

- Africa Cup of Nations: 2025
- FIFA World Cup fourth place: 2022

Individual

- African Footballer of the Year: 2025
- African Youth Player of the Year: 2018, 2019
- Lion d'Or African Footballer of the Year: 2024, 2025
- Bundesliga Rookie of the Month: September 2018, November 2018, December 2019
- Bundesliga Team of the Year: 2019–20
- Globe Soccer Awards Best Young Arab Player of the Year: 2019
- Joy Awards Arab Sportsman of the Year: 2022
- UEFA Champions League Breakthrough XI: 2019
- Serie A Team of the Year: 2020–21
- ESM Team of the Year: 2021, 2025
- IFFHS Men's World Team: 2021, 2022, 2025
- IFFHS Africa Team of The Year: 2020, 2021, 2022, 2023, 2024, 2025
- IFFHS All-time Morocco Men's Dream Team
- CAF Team of the Year: 2019, 2023, 2024
- FIFPRO World 11: 2022, 2025, 2026
- FIFA Men's World 11: 2025
- Africa Cup of Nations Team of The Tournament: 2021, 2025
- UEFA Champions League Team of the Season: 2024–25
- Ghana Football Awards Best African International: 2025
- UMFP Best Moroccan player abroad: 2020–21, 2021–22, 2024–25
- UNFP Ligue 1 Team of the Year: 2022–23, 2023–24, 2024–25, 2025–26
- The Athletic Ligue 1 Team of the Season: 2023–24
- The Athletic European Men's Team of the Season: 2024–25, 2025–26
- Prix Marc-Vivien Foé: 2024–25

Orders

- Order of the Throne: 2022
