= Sofascore =

Application for following sports statistics

- Founded: 2010; 16 years ago
- Founder: Ivan Bešlić, Zlatko Hrkać
- Products: sports statistics
- Website: sofascore.com

Sofascore is an application for following sports statistics and results. The app is owned and developed by SofaIT from Zagreb, Croatia. According to a report released by the company in 2020, the app has over 20 million users. It covers 20 different sports and around 11,000 different leagues and tournaments, and is available in more than 30 different languages.

The app founders are Ivan Bešlić and Zlatko Hrkać, who previously worked on other Internet projects during the era of "blogs and forums". They started the app for collecting sports results in 2010. After significant user engagement, Google invited the founders to Dublin in 2011. That year, they formed a small office for programme developers. In 2012, just before the UEFA Euro 2012, they changed the app's name to Sofascore in order to develop a brand.

They developed a system for tracking and assessing performances of athletes in lower-tier leagues that were underrepresented in mainstream coverage and analytics, which distinguished the app from competitors.

The app's main user base is in Europe, South America and Africa. A lightweight version was later released for regions with limited internet infrastructure.

As of 2023, Luka Modrić is a brand ambassador of Sofascore.
