= CD Colonia Ofigevi =

Football club based in Getafe, Spain

Colonia Ofigevi
- Full name: Club Deportivo Colonia Ofigevi
- Founded: 1981
- Dissolved: 2009
- Ground: El Bercial; Getafe, Spain
- Capacity: 1,500
- 2008–09: 3ª - Group 7, 19th of 21 (relegated)
- Website: http://www.cdcofigevi.es/
Home colours	Away colours

Club Deportivo Colonia Ofigevi was a football team based in El Bercial, Getafe in the autonomous Community of Madrid. Founded in 1981, the club's home ground was Polideportivo El Bercial, which has a capacity of 2,000 spectators.

== History ==
The Colonia Ofigevi was founded in 1981 in the District of El Bercial in Getafe being on a principle known as Club Deportivo Colonia and the main goal was to encourage the development of football in the neighborhood. During their first years in lower grades they began playing football in Madrid.

Later the team happened to be sponsored by Ofigevi, which imposes the name of the company in the club and began to make investments for the team to climb categories. In the 2006–07 season was their debut in the Tercera División but then declined the following year to Senior. The Colonia Ofigevi returned in the 2008–09 campaign in Tercera División.

Before the 2009–10 season, they were forced to fold due to high debts with its players.

== Season to season ==
Season	Tier	Division	Place	Copa del Rey
1998–99	8	3ª Reg.	6th	
1999–2000	8	3ª Reg.	11th	
2001–02	6	1ª Reg.	7th	
2002–03	6	1ª Reg.	10th	
2003–04	6	1ª Reg.	5th	
2004–05	6	1ª Reg.	2nd	
2005–06	5	Reg. Pref.	2nd	
2006–07	4	3ª	20th	
2007–08	5	Reg. Pref.	1st	
2008–09	4	3ª	19th	

- 2 seasons in Tercera División

== Uniform ==
- Home Uniform T-shirt, trousers and half red
- Away Uniform T-shirt, trousers and half white
- Sponsor: Ofigevi

== Stadium ==
The team played their home matches at the Polideportivo El Bercial, a field with artificial grass and capacity for 2,000 spectators.

== Former players ==
- (Spain) (Dominican Republic) Freijo
- (Morocco) Achraf Hakimi
