= Castrol performance index =

Sports player ranking system

The Castrol performance index is a ranking system created by Castrol for men's club association football as part of a sponsorship package with FIFA. The system uses mathematical formulas which evaluate various player performance in terms of how individual actions either assist or prevent goals. The system takes into account the strength of the opposition and the time in a game the player's actions occurred.

Castrol publishes several rankings: players in top five European leagues monthly during a season, MLS player ranking and international tournament rankings. Castrol became the official oil lubricant of FIFA in 2008. It published a ranking in UEFA Euro 2008. It was an official sponsor the 2010 FIFA World Cup in South Africa and an index measuring World Cup player performance was updated after each round of matches. Castrol made a ranking in Euro 2012 and the 2013 FIFA Confederations Cup.

== Castrol index ranking ==
The Castrol Index is a rolling ranking system that measures performance of every football player across Europe's top five leagues during the course of a 12-month period. Rankings are published monthly.

To get Castrol Index Ranking, first "Castrol Index Score" is calculated for every player in every league and Champions league match, then the score weighted to get "Castrol Ranking points", and lastly, cumulative points from every match during the 12-month period are multiplied with 90 and divided by total minutes played.

Weightings are different in every league and are adjusted after every season by strength of every league. For example, Champions league knock-out stage has biggest weight.

=== Top-rated players ===
Since the beginning of the ranking, September 2009, there have been three players in the top position.

First	Last	Months	Player	Country	Club	Ref
September 2009	November 2009	3	Thierry Henry	France	Spain Barcelona	
December 2009	December 2009	1	Cristiano Ronaldo	Portugal	Spain Real Madrid	
January 2010	March 2013	39	Lionel Messi	Argentina	Spain Barcelona	
April 2013	April 2013	1	Cristiano Ronaldo	Portugal	Spain Real Madrid	
May 2013	May 2013; Incumbent	29	Lionel Messi	Argentina	Spain Barcelona	

=== EDGE Performance of the Month ===
Castrol awards every month an "EDGE Performance of the Month" title for a player who gets most performance points in a match during the month. Also, after every season, the top performing player (the top player in the ranking at the end of the season) is announced.

Month	Player	Points	Club	Against	Date	Reference
Season 2009–10
October 2009	Didier Drogba	2300	Chelsea	Bolton Wanderers	31 October	
November 2009	Jermain Defoe	2575	Tottenham Hotspur	Wigan Athletic	22 November	
December 2009	Michael Owen	1962	Manchester United	VfL Wolfsburg	8 December	
January 2010	Wayne Rooney	2532	Manchester United	Hull City	23 January	
February 2010	Cristiano Ronaldo	2163	Real Madrid	Xerez	13 February	
March 2010	Mevlüt Erdinç	2307	Paris Saint-Germain	Sochaux	13 March	
Performance of the Season 2010	Lionel Messi	2828	Barcelona	Arsenal	6 April	
Player of the season	Lionel Messi		Barcelona			
Season 2010–11
August 2010	Andy Carroll	1426	Newcastle United	Aston Villa	22 August	
September 2010	Lionel Messi	2790	Barcelona	Panathinaikos	14 September	
October 2010	Cristiano Ronaldo	2279	Real Madrid	Racing Santander	23 October	
November 2010	Dimitar Berbatov	2593	Manchester United	Blackburn Rovers	27 November	
December 2010	Raúl	2198	Schalke 04	1. FC Köln	18 December	
January 2011	Dimitar Berbatov	2251	Manchester United	Birmingham City	22 January	
February 2011	Alexis Sánchez	2809	Udinese	Palermo	27 February	
March 2011	Karim Benzema	2072	Real Madrid	Málaga	3 March	
April 2011	Maxi Rodríguez	2212	Liverpool	Birmingham City	23 April	
May 2011	Cristiano Ronaldo	2480	Real Madrid	Sevilla	7 May	
Player of the season	Lionel Messi		Barcelona			
Season 2011–12
August 2011	Edin Džeko	2435	Manchester City	Tottenham Hotspur	28 August	
September 2011	Lionel Messi	2674	Barcelona	Osasuna	17 September	
October 2011	André Ayew	2086	Marseille	Ajaccio	22 October	
November 2011	Mario Gómez	2502	Bayern Munich	Napoli	2 November	
December 2011	Bafétimbi Gomis	2502	Lyon	Dinamo Zagreb	7 December	
January 2012	Lionel Messi	2388	Barcelona	Málaga	22 January	
February 2012	Lionel Messi	2766	Barcelona	Valencia	19 February	
March 2012	Mario Gómez	3551	Bayern Munich	Basel	13 March	
April 2012	Danny Welbeck	1950	Manchester United	Aston Villa	15 April	
May 2012	Robin van Persie	2223	Arsenal	Norwich City	5 May	
Player of the season	Lionel Messi		Barcelona			
Season 2012–13
August 2012	Radamel Falcao	2126	Atlético Madrid	Athletic Bilbao	27 August	
September 2012	Thomas Müller	2240	Bayern Munich	VfB Stuttgart	2 September	
October 2012	Álvaro Negredo	2126	Sevilla	Mallorca	22 October	
November 2012	Jordi Gómez	2205	Wigan Athletic	Reading	24 November	
December 2012	Gareth Bale	2525	Tottenham Hotspur	Aston Villa	26 December	
January 2013	Nelson Valdez	2144	Valencia	Deportivo La Coruña	26 January	
February 2013	Joël Matip	1849	Schalke 04	Fortuna Düsseldorf	23 February	
March 2013	Claudio Pizarro	2145	Bayern Munich	Hamburger SV	30 March	
April 2013	Robert Lewandowski	2737	Borussia Dortmund	Real Madrid	24 April	
May 2013	Miroslav Klose	2737	Lazio	Bologna	5 May	
Player of the season	Lionel Messi		Barcelona			

== UEFA Euro 2008 ==
Xavi was awarded with the Castrol Player of the Tournament trophy in UEFA Euro 2008. He was selected by UEFA Technical Team taking into account public votes of the top ten of Castrol Performance Index.

== 2010 FIFA World Cup ==
The top 10 players in 2010 FIFA World Cup were selected from players who advanced to round of 16.

Rank	Player	Position	Country
1.	Sergio Ramos	Defender	Spain
2.	Joan Capdevila	Defender	Spain
3.	Carles Puyol	Defender	Spain
4.	Philipp Lahm	Defender	Germany
5.	Gerard Piqué	Defender	Spain
6.	David Villa	Forward	Spain
7.	Wesley Sneijder	Midfielder	Netherlands
8.	Luis Suárez	Forward	Uruguay
9.	Thomas Müller	Midfielder	Germany
10.	Manuel Neuer	Goalkeeper	Germany

Top 11 team with best one goalkeeper, four defenders, four midfielders, and two forwards included also midfielders Mark van Bommel (Netherlands) and Sergio Busquets (Spain) (and excluded Gerard Piqué as he was fifth best defender).

== UEFA Euro 2012 ==
The ranking was first used in Euro 2008 qualifications and the main tournament, as well as in Euro 2012. Castrol predicted Spain and Netherlands to play in the final and Spain to win it. The top 10 players were:

Rank	Player	Position	Country
1.	Sergio Ramos	Defender	Spain
2.	Cristiano Ronaldo	Forward	Portugal
3.	Gerard Piqué	Defender	Spain
4.	Xabi Alonso	Midfielder	Spain
5.	Andrés Iniesta	Midfielder	Spain
6.	Jordi Alba	Defender	Spain
7.	Álvaro Arbeloa	Defender	Spain
8.	Pepe	Defender	Portugal
9.	Sergio Busquets	Midfielder	Spain
10.	Claudio Marchisio	Midfielder	Italy

== 2013 FIFA Confederations Cup ==
The top 10 was:

Rank	Player	Position	Country
1.	Neymar	Forward	Brazil
2.	Sergio Ramos	Defender	Spain
3.	Jordi Alba	Defender	Spain
4.	David Luiz	Defender	Brazil
5.	Thiago Silva	Defender	Brazil
6.	Andrés Iniesta	Midfielder	Spain
7.	Fred	Forward	Brazil
8.	Gerard Piqué	Defender	Spain
9.	Luiz Gustavo	Midfielder	Brazil
10.	Marcelo	Defender	Brazil

Castrol Index Top 11 had 2 forwards, 4 midfielders, 4 defenders and a goalkeeper. In addition to above, best goalkeeper was Júlio César (Brazil), and next two best midfielders were Daniele De Rossi (Italy) and Paulinho (Brazil). Defenders Marcelo and Piqué were not included.

== 2014 FIFA World Cup ==
The top 10 was: [62]

Rank	Player	Position	Country
1.	Toni Kroos	Midfielder	Germany
2.	Arjen Robben	Forward	Netherlands
3.	Stefan de Vrij	Defender	Netherlands
4.	Mats Hummels	Defender	Germany
5.	Thomas Müller	Forward	Germany
6.	Karim Benzema	Forward	France
7.	Oscar	Midfielder	Brazil
8.	Thiago Silva	Defender	Brazil
9.	Marcos Rojo	Defender	Argentina
10.	Ron Vlaar	Defender	Netherlands

Toni Kroos was the top player, and the Top 11 was made with a 4–4–2 formation:

Goalkeepers	Defenders	Midfielders	Forwards
Manuel Neuer (Germany)	Marcos Rojo (Argentina); Mats Hummels (Germany); Thiago Silva (Brazil); Stefan de Vrij (Netherlands)	Oscar (Brazil); Toni Kroos (Germany); Philipp Lahm (Germany); James Rodríguez (Colombia)	Arjen Robben (Netherlands); Thomas Müller (Germany)
