= 1980 World Champions' Gold Cup squads =

These are the squads of the 1980 Mundialito tournament that was played between 30 December 1980 and 10 January 1981, in Uruguay. Only six teams participated, because only six countries had won the FIFA World Cup at the time, including Argentina, Brazil, England, Germany, Italy, and Uruguay. The Netherlands, the runner-up at the 1974 and 1978 World Cups, were invited in place of England, who declined.

== Argentina ==
Head coach: Cesar Luis Menotti

No.	Pos.	Player	Date of birth (age)	Caps	Club
1	GK	Ubaldo Fillol	21 July 1950 (aged 30)		(Argentina) River Plate
2	DF	Luis Galván	24 February 1948 (aged 32)		(Argentina) Talleres de Córdoba
3	DF	Alberto Tarantini	3 December 1955 (aged 25)		(Argentina) River Plate
4	DF	Jorge Olguín	17 May 1952 (aged 28)		(Argentina) Independiente
5	MF	Américo Gallego	25 April 1955 (aged 25)		(Argentina) Newell's Old Boys
6	DF	Daniel Passarella	25 May 1953 (aged 27)		(Argentina) River Plate
7	MF	Daniel Bertoni	14 March 1955 (aged 25)		(Italy) AC Fiorentina
8	MF	Osvaldo Ardiles	3 August 1952 (aged 28)		(England) Tottenham Hotspur
9	FW	Ramón Díaz	29 August 1959 (aged 21)		(Argentina) River Plate
10	MF	Diego Maradona	30 October 1960 (aged 20)		(Argentina) Argentinos Juniors
11	FW	Mario Kempes	15 July 1954 (aged 26)		(Spain) Valencia
12	GK	Héctor Baley	16 November 1950 (aged 30)		(Argentina) Independiente
13	MF	Carlos Fren	27 December 1954 (aged 26)		(Argentina) Independiente
14	FW	Leopoldo Luque	3 May 1949 (aged 31)		(Argentina) River Plate
15	MF	Juan Barbas	23 August 1959 (aged 21)		(Argentina) Racing Club
16	MF	José Daniel Valencia	3 October 1955 (aged 25)		(Argentina) Talleres de Córdoba
17	DF	José Van Tuyne	13 December 1954 (aged 26)		(Argentina) Talleres de Córdoba
18	DF	Victorio Ocaño	9 June 1954 (aged 26)		(Argentina) Talleres de Córdoba

== Brazil ==
Head coach: Telê Santana

No.	Pos.	Player	Date of birth (age)	Caps	Club
1	GK	Carlos	4 March 1956		(Brazil) Ponte Preta
2	DF	Edevaldo	28 January 1953		(Brazil) Fluminense
3	DF	Oscar	20 January 1954		(Brazil) São Paulo
4	DF	Luizinho	22 October 1958		(Brazil) Atlético Mineiro
5	MF	Batista	8 March 1955		(Brazil) Internacional
6	DF	Júnior	29 June 1954		(Brazil) Flamengo
7	MF	Tita	1 April 1958		(Brazil) Flamengo
8	MF	Toninho Cerezo	21 April 1955		(Brazil) Atlético Mineiro
9	MF	Sócrates	19 February 1954		(Brazil) Corinthians
10	MF	Renato	21 February 1957		(Brazil) São Paulo
11	FW	Zé Sérgio	8 March 1957		(Brazil) São Paulo
12	GK	João Leite	13 October 1955		(Brazil) Atlético Mineiro
13	DF	Getúlio	25 February 1954		(Brazil) São Paulo
14	DF	Juninho	29 August 1959		(Brazil) Ponte Preta
15	DF	Edinho	5 June 1955		(Brazil) Fluminense
16	MF	Paulo Isidoro	3 August 1953		(Brazil) Grêmio
17	FW	Serginho	23 December 1953		(Brazil) São Paulo
18	FW	Éder	25 March 1957		(Brazil) Atlético Mineiro

== Italy ==
Head coach: Enzo Bearzot

No.	Pos.	Player	Date of birth (age)	Caps	Club
1	GK	Ivano Bordon	13 April 1951		(Italy) Inter Milan
2	DF	Giuseppe Baresi	7 February 1958		(Italy) Inter Milan
3	DF	Antonio Cabrini	8 October 1957		(Italy) Juventus
4	DF	Claudio Gentile	27 September 1953		(Italy) Juventus
5	DF	Gaetano Scirea	25 May 1953		(Italy) Juventus
6	DF	Pietro Vierchowod	6 April 1959		(Italy) Como
7	MF	Carlo Ancelotti	10 June 1959		(Italy) Roma
8	MF	Giancarlo Antognoni	1 April 1954		(Italy) Fiorentina
9	MF	Giampiero Marini	25 February 1951		(Italy) Inter Milan
10	MF	Gabriele Oriali	25 November 1952		(Italy) Inter Milan
11	MF	Marco Tardelli	24 September 1954		(Italy) Juventus
12	GK	Giovanni Galli	29 April 1958		(Italy) Fiorentina
13	MF	Renato Zaccarelli	18 January 1951		(Italy) Torino
14	MF	Salvatore Bagni	25 September 1956		(Italy) Perugia
15	MF	Bruno Conti	13 March 1955		(Italy) Roma
16	FW	Alessandro Altobelli	28 November 1955		(Italy) Inter Milan
17	FW	Francesco Graziani	16 December 1952		(Italy) Torino
18	FW	Roberto Pruzzo	1 April 1955		(Italy) Roma

== Netherlands ==
Head coach: Jan Zwartkruis

No.	Pos.	Player	Date of birth (age)	Caps	Club
1	GK	Pim Doesburg	28 October 1943		(Netherlands) PSV Eindhoven
2	DF	Ben Wijnstekers	31 August 1955		(Netherlands) Feyenoord
3	DF	Ronald Spelbos	8 July 1954		(Netherlands) AZ'67
4	DF	Ernie Brandts	3 February 1956		(Netherlands) PSV Eindhoven
5	DF	Hugo Hovenkamp	5 October 1950		(Netherlands) AZ'67
6	MF	Willy van de Kerkhof	16 September 1951		(Netherlands) PSV Eindhoven
7	MF	Martin Jol	16 January 1956		(Netherlands) FC Twente
8	MF	Jan Peters	18 August 1954		(Netherlands) AZ'67
9	FW	Kees Kist	7 August 1952		(Netherlands) AZ'67
10	FW	René van de Kerkhof	16 September 1951		(Netherlands) PSV Eindhoven
11	FW	Pierre Vermeulen	16 March 1956		(Netherlands) Feyenoord
12	DF	John Metgod	27 February 1958		(Netherlands) AZ'67
13	MF	Michel Valke	24 August 1959		(Netherlands) PSV Eindhoven
14	FW	Pier Tol	12 July 1958		(Netherlands) AZ'67
15	FW	Toine van Mierlo	25 June 1957		(Netherlands) Willem II
16	MF	Peter Arntz	5 February 1953		(Netherlands) AZ'67
17	DF	Piet Wildschut	25 October 1957		(Netherlands) PSV Eindhoven
18	GK	Hans van Breukelen	4 October 1956		(Netherlands) FC Utrecht

== Uruguay ==
Head coach: Roque Máspoli

No.	Pos.	Player	Date of birth (age)	Caps	Club
1	GK	Rodolfo Rodríguez	20 January 1956		(Uruguay) Nacional
2	DF	Walter Olivera	26 August 1952		(Uruguay) Peñarol
3	DF	Hugo de León	27 February 1958		(Brazil) Grêmio
4	DF	José Moreira	30 September 1958		(Uruguay) Nacional
5	MF	Ariel Krasouski	31 May 1958		(Uruguay) Montevideo Wanderers
6	DF	Daniel Martínez	21 December 1959		(Uruguay) Danubio
7	FW	Venancio Ramos	20 June 1959		(Uruguay) Peñarol
8	MF	Eduardo de la Peña	7 June 1955		(Uruguay) Nacional
9	FW	Waldemar Victorino	22 June 1952		(Uruguay) Nacional
10	MF	Rubén Paz	8 August 1959		(Uruguay) Peñarol
11	FW	Julio Morales	16 February 1945		(Uruguay) Nacional
12	GK	Fernando Alvez	4 September 1959		(Uruguay) Peñarol
13	FW	Jorge Siviero	13 May 1952		(Uruguay) Sud América
14	DF	Nelson Marcenaro	4 September 1952		(Uruguay) Peñarol
15	DF	Víctor Diogo	9 April 1958		(Uruguay) Peñarol
16	FW	Arsenio Luzardo	4 September 1959		(Uruguay) Nacional
17	MF	Jorge Barrios	24 January 1961		(Uruguay) Montevideo Wanderers
18	MF	Ernesto Vargas	1 May 1961		(Uruguay) Peñarol

== West Germany ==
Head coach: Jupp Derwall

No.	Pos.	Player	Date of birth (age)	Caps	Club
1	GK	Harald Schumacher	6 March 1954		(Germany) 1. FC Köln
2	DF	Manfred Kaltz	6 January 1953		(Germany) Hamburger SV
3	MF	Rainer Bonhof	29 March 1952		(Spain) Valencia CF
4	DF	Karlheinz Förster	25 July 1958		(Germany) VfB Stuttgart
5	DF	Bernard Dietz	22 March 1948		(Germany) MSV Duisburg
6	DF	Hans-Peter Briegel	11 October 1955		(Germany) 1. FC Kaiserslautern
7	MF	Felix Magath	26 July 1953		(Germany) Hamburger SV
8	FW	Karl-Heinz Rummenigge	25 September 1955		(Germany) Bayern Munich
9	FW	Horst Hrubesch	17 April 1951		(Germany) Hamburger SV
10	MF	Hansi Müller	27 July 1957		(Germany) VfB Stuttgart
11	FW	Klaus Allofs	5 December 1956		(Germany) Fortuna Düsseldorf
12	GK	Eike Immel	27 November 1960		(Germany) Borussia Dortmund
13	DF	Kurt Niedermayer	25 November 1955		(Germany) Bayern Munich
14	DF	Wilfried Hannes	17 May 1957		(Germany) Borussia Mönchengladbach
15	MF	Miroslav Votava	25 April 1956		(Germany) Werder Bremen
16	MF	Wolfgang Dremmler	12 July 1954		(Germany) Bayern Munich
17	MF	Karl Allgöwer	5 January 1957		(Germany) VfB Stuttgart
18	MF	Ronny Borchers	10 August 1957		(Germany) Eintracht Frankfurt
