= José Hermes Moreira =

Uruguayan footballer (born 1958)

Personal information
- Date of birth: 30 September 1958 (age 68)
- Place of birth: San José de Mayo, Uruguay
- Position: Defender

Senior career*
| Years | Team | Apps | (Gls) |
| 1976–1979 | Danubio F.C. | 68 | (7) |
| 1979–1984 | Nacional | 240 | (15) |
| 1984–1988 | Chicago Sting (indoor) | 164 | (36) |
| 1988–1991 | Wichita Wings (indoor) | 119 | (35) |
| 1991 | Tampa Bay Rowdies | 13 | (2) |
| 1991–1992 | Cleveland Crunch (indoor) | 32 | (6) |
| 1993–1994 | Canton Invaders (indoor) | 37 | (15) |
| 1995–1996 | Houston Hotshots (indoor) | 55 | (10) |

International career
| 1979–1981 | Uruguay | 23 | (0) |
Medal record
Men's football
Representing Uruguay
World Champions’ Gold Cup
| Winner | 1980 Uruguay |
- * Club domestic league appearances and goals

José Hermes "Chico" Moreira (born 30 September 1958) is a Uruguayan former footballer. Beginning in 1979 he played nine years in the Uruguayan Primera División for Danubio and Nacional. Moreira made 23 appearances for the Uruguay national football team from 1979 to 1981. He was also part of Uruguay's squad for the 1979 Copa América tournament. He later spent 12 years in the United States, playing mostly for indoor soccer clubs.

His son Pablo (born 1985), raised in the United States, played for the Akron Zips and coached the New England Revolution.
