= Jorge Barrios (footballer) =

Uruguayan footballer (born 1961)

Personal information
- Full name: Jorge Wálter Barrios Balestrasse
- Date of birth: 24 January 1961 (age 65)
- Place of birth: Las Piedras, Uruguay
- Height: 1.81 m (5 ft 11 1/2 in)
- Position: Midfielder

Senior career*
Years	Team	Apps	(Gls)
1977–1985	Wanderers		
1985–1987	Olympiacos	49	(2)
1987–1991	Levadiakos	113	(6)
1992–1993	Peñarol		
1993–2000	Wanderers	-	

International career
1980–1994	Uruguay	60	(3)
Medal record
Representing Uruguay
World Champions’ Gold Cup
Winner	1980 Uruguay
Copa América
Winner	1983
CONMEBOL–UEFA Cup of Champions
Runner-up	1985 France
- * Club domestic league appearances and goals

Jorge Wálter Barrios Balestrasse (born 24 January 1961) is a retired football midfielder from Uruguay, who was nicknamed "Chifle" during his professional career. Having made his official debut on July 18, 1980 against Peru (0-0), Barrios obtained a total number of 60 international caps for the Uruguay national football team.

He was a Mundialito Winner at the 1980 Copa D'Oro, and he scored the first goal in the final game against Brazil (2-1) on 10 January 1981.

He represented his native country at the 1986 FIFA World Cup, against West Germany, Scotland (as captain) and Argentina wearing the number eight jersey.

Away of Uruguay, he made a significant career in Greece with Olympiacos for two years (1985-1987) and Levadiakos for four years (1987-1991).

After the end of his playing years Barrios became a manager and managed teams in Greece such as Doxa Drama, Kavala, Ionikos and Niki Volos. He also managed Olympiakos Nicosia of Cyprus.

== Honours ==
Olympiacos

- Alpha Ethniki: 1986–87
