= Eduardo de la Peña =

Uruguayan footballer (born 1955)

Personal information
- Full name: Eduardo María de la Peña Ayerza
- Date of birth: 7 June 1955 (age 71)
- Place of birth: Minas, Uruguay
- Position: Midfielder

Senior career*
Years	Team	Apps	(Gls)
1974–1975	Nacional Universitario		
1976–1982	Nacional		
1982–1983	Tecos		
1984	Huracán	15	(1)

International career
1979–1981	Uruguay	19	(1)
Medal record
Men's football
Representing Uruguay
Mundialito
Winner	1980 Uruguay
- * Club domestic league appearances and goals

Eduardo María de la Peña Ayerza (born 7 June 1955) is a retired football midfielder who played most of his career in the Uruguayan Primera División. He also played for Uruguay in the 1979 Copa América.

== Career ==
Born in Minas, De la Peña began playing professional football with Club Nacional de Football in 1976. The same year the Nacional midfielder won the local championship.

In 1982, De la Peña moved to Mexico to play for Mexican Primera División side Tecos de la UAG. Two seasons later, he went to Argentina to play for Argentine Primera División side Club Atlético Huracán.

De la Peña played in the Uruguay national football team for four years, making 19 appearances and scoring one goal. He participated in the 1979 Copa América.
