= Ariel Krasouski =

Uruguayan footballer (born 1958)

Personal information
- Date of birth: 20 January 1956 (age 70)
- Place of birth: Montevideo, Uruguay
- Height: 1.82 m (6 ft 0 in)
- Position: Midfielder

Senior career*
Years	Team	Apps	(Gls)
1977–1981	Montevideo Wanderers	93	(4)
1981–1986	Boca Juniors	161	(17)
1986–1987	San Lorenzo	24	(1)
1987–1989	Boca Juniors	28	(2)
1989–1990	Estudiantes	11	(0)
1990–1991	Liverpool Montevideo		
1991–1992	Rentistas		
1992–1993	River Plate Montevideo		
1993–1994	Basáñez		
1994–1995	Fenix		

International career
1979–1981	Uruguay	17	(2)

Managerial career
- 1998–1999: Defensor Sporting
- 2000–2003: Tacuarembó
- 2004: Miramar Misiones
- 2005: Paysandú
- 2005–2006: Rampla Juniors
Medal record
Men's football
Representing Uruguay
Mundialito
Winner	1980 Uruguay
- * Club domestic league appearances and goals

Ariel Krasouski (born 26 May 1958) is a former Uruguayan international footballer and manager who played as a midfielder.

== Honours ==
Boca Juniors

- Argentine Primera División: 1981
