= Venancio Ramos =

Uruguayan footballer (born 1959)

Personal information
- Full name: Venancio Ariel Ramos Villanueva
- Date of birth: June 20, 1959 (age 67)
- Place of birth: Artigas, Uruguay
- Height: 1.70 m (5 ft 7 in)
- Position: Striker

Senior career*
Years	Team	Apps	(Gls)
1977–1983	Peñarol	207	(49)
1984–1986	Lens	72	(18)
1987–1988	Independiente	17	(1)
1989–1990	Racing Montevideo	18	(3)
1990-1991	Nacional	46	(8)
1992–1993	Defensor Sporting	31	(2)
1994	El Tanque Sisley	12	(1)
Total		403	(82)

International career
1978–1991	Uruguay	41	(5)
Medal record
Representing Uruguay
Copa América
Winner	1983
Mundialito
Winner	1980 Uruguay
CONMEBOL–UEFA Cup of Champions
Runner-up	1985 France
- * Club domestic league appearances and goals

Venancio Ariel Ramos Villanueva (born 20 June 1959) is a Uruguayan former football striker, who was nicknamed "Chicharra" during his professional career.

== Club career ==
Ramos started his playing career in 1977 with Peñarol with whom he won several major championships including four Uruguayan Primera titles, the Copa Libertadores and Copa Intercontinental in 1982.

In 1984, he joined French side Lens before returning to South America in 1986 to play for Independiente of Argentina.

Ramos returned to Uruguay in 1989 where he played for Racing Montevideo then Peñarol's fiercest rivals Nacional. In his later years he played for Defensor Sporting and finally El Tanque Sisley.

== International career ==
He made his official international debut on May 24, 1978 against Spain (0-0), Ramos obtained a total number of 41 international caps for the Uruguay national football team. He represented his native country at the 1986 FIFA World Cup, wearing the number nineteen jersey.

== Titles ==
=== Peñarol ===
- Uruguayan First Division (4): 1978, 1979, 1981, 1982
- Copa Libertadores (1): 1982
- Intercontinental Cup (1): 1982
