= Waldemar Victorino =

Uruguayan footballer (1952–2023)

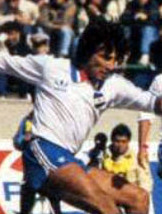
- Victorino at the 1980 Intercontinental Cup

Personal information
- Full name: Waldemar Victorino Barreto
- Date of birth: 22 May 1952
- Place of birth: Montevideo, Uruguay
- Date of death: 29 August 2023 (aged 71)
- Position: Forward

Senior career*
Years	Team	Apps	(Gls)
1969–1973	Cerro		
1974	Progreso		
1975–1978	River Plate (URU)		
1979–1980	Nacional	19	(11)
1981	Deportivo Cali	13	(11)
1982	Nacional		
1982–1983	Cagliari	10	(0)
1983–1985	Newell's Old Boys	26	(5)
1985–1986	Colón de Santa Fe		
1986–1987	LDU Portoviejo		
1988	Sport Boys		
1988–1989	Marítimo de La Guaira		
1989	Defensor Lima		

International career
1976–1981	Uruguay	33	(15)
Medal record
Men's football
Representing Uruguay
World Champions’ Gold Cup
Winner	1980 Uruguay
- * Club domestic league appearances and goals

Waldemar Victorino Barreto (22 May 1952 – 29 August 2023) was a Uruguayan footballer who played as a forward. He played football in six countries: Uruguay, Colombia, Italy, Argentina, Ecuador and Peru. Victorino is famous for scoring the winning goal to capture three major titles between 1980 and 1981. The first was scoring against Sport Club Internacional to win the 1980 Copa Libertadores with Nacional. The second was scoring for the Uruguay national team against Brazil to win the 1980 World Champions' Gold Cup. Finally, he scored against Nottingham Forest to win the 1980 Intercontinental Cup with Nacional.

Victorino took his own life by firearm on 29 August 2023, at the age of 71.

== Career statistics ==
Appearances and goals by national team and year
National team	Year	Apps	Goals
Uruguay	1976	5	3
Uruguay	1977	2	0
Uruguay	1978	0	0
Uruguay	1979	7	4
Uruguay	1980	11	4
Uruguay	1981	8	4
Total		33	15

== Honours ==
Nacional

- Primera División Uruguaya: 1980
- Copa Libertadores: 1980
- Intercontinental Cup: 1980

Uruguay

- Mundialito: 1980
