= Walter Olivera =

Uruguayan footballer (born 1952)

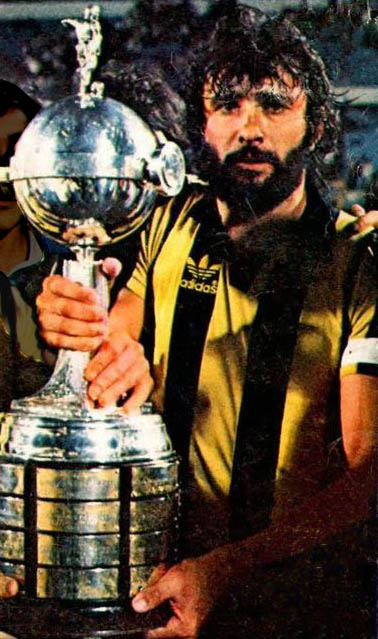
- Olivera in 1982

Personal information
- Full name: Wálter Daniel Olivera Prada
- Date of birth: 16 August 1952 (age 74)
- Place of birth: Montevideo, Uruguay
- Height: 1.84 m (6 ft 0 in)
- Position: Defender

Senior career*
Years	Team	Apps	(Gls)
1972–1983	Peñarol	384	(20)
1984–1985	Atlético Mineiro	50	(2)

International career
1973–1983	Uruguay	30	(1)

Managerial career
- 1985: Atlético Mineiro
- 1986–1987: Rampla Juniors
- 1992: Peñarol
Medal record
Men's football
Representing Uruguay
World Champions’ Gold Cup
Winner	1980 Uruguay
Copa América
Winner	1983
- * Club domestic league appearances and goals

Walter Daniel Olivera Prada (born 16 August 1952) is a Uruguayan footballer who played as a defender. He made ten appearances for the Uruguay national team from 1973 to 1983. He was also part of Uruguay's squad for the 1975 Copa América tournament.
