= Víctor Diogo =

Uruguayan footballer (born 1958)

Personal information
- Full name: Víctor Hugo Diogo Silva
- Date of birth: April 9, 1958 (age 68)
- Place of birth: Treinta y Tres, Uruguay
- Height: 1.79 m (5 ft 10 1/2 in)
- Position: Right back

Senior career*
Years	Team	Apps	(Gls)
1977–1984	Peñarol	209	(9)
1984–1989	Palmeiras	167	(8)
Total		376	(17)

International career
1979–1986	Uruguay	33	(1)
Medal record
Representing Uruguay
Copa América
Winner	1983
CONMEBOL–UEFA Cup of Champions
Runner-up	1985 France
Mundialito
Winner	1980 Uruguay
- * Club domestic league appearances and goals

Víctor Hugo Diogo Silva (born April 9, 1958) is a Uruguayan retired footballer who played as a defender . He played in 33 games for the Uruguay national football team, scoring one goal.

Diogo played club football for Peñarol in Uruguay. He made his international debut on September 20, 1979 in a Copa América match against Paraguay (0-0) in Asunción. Diogo was a member of the team that competed at the 1986 FIFA World Cup in Mexico.

Between 1986 and 1989 he played for Palmeiras of Brazil.
