= Jan Zwartkruis =

Dutch football manager (1926–2013)

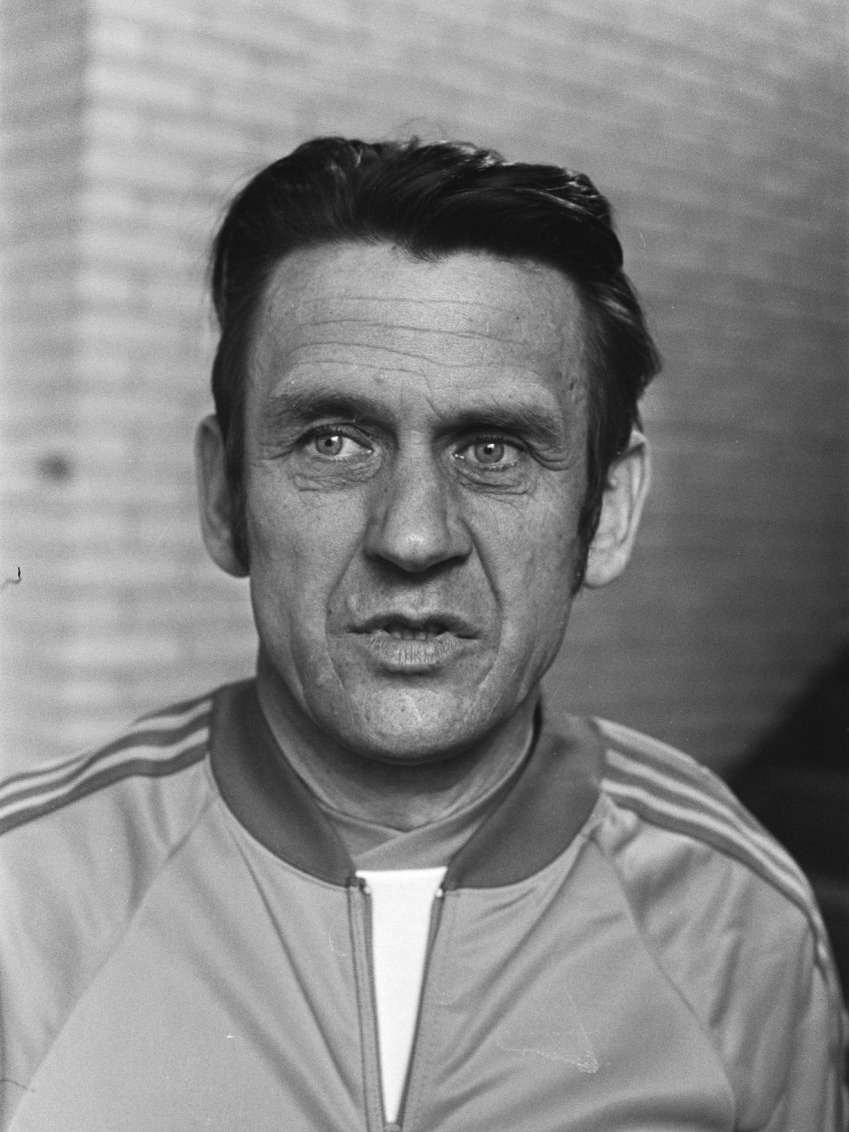
- Zwartkruis in 1977

Personal information
- Full name: Johannes Hermanus Hendrikus Zwartkruis
- Date of birth: 18 February 1926
- Place of birth: Elst, Netherlands
- Date of death: 7 March 2013 (aged 87)
- Position: Defender

Managerial career
- Years: Team
- 1975: SV Spero
- 1976–1977: Netherlands
- 1978–1981: Netherlands
- 1992–1994: Netherlands Antilles

Johannes Hermanus Hendrikus "Jan" Zwartkruis (Dutch pronunciation: [jɑn ˈzʋɑrtkrœys]; 18 February 1926 – 7 March 2013) was a Dutch manager. He was manager of the Netherlands national team for two periods (1976–77, 1978–81), coaching the team in 28 matches, including the 1980 UEFA European Football Championship and 1980 Mundialito. He also coached the Trinidad and Tobago for a brief time in the 1980s and the Netherlands Antilles during the 1994 FIFA World Cup qualification round for CONCACAF Caribbean Zone.
