= Edevaldo =

Brazilian footballer (born 1958)

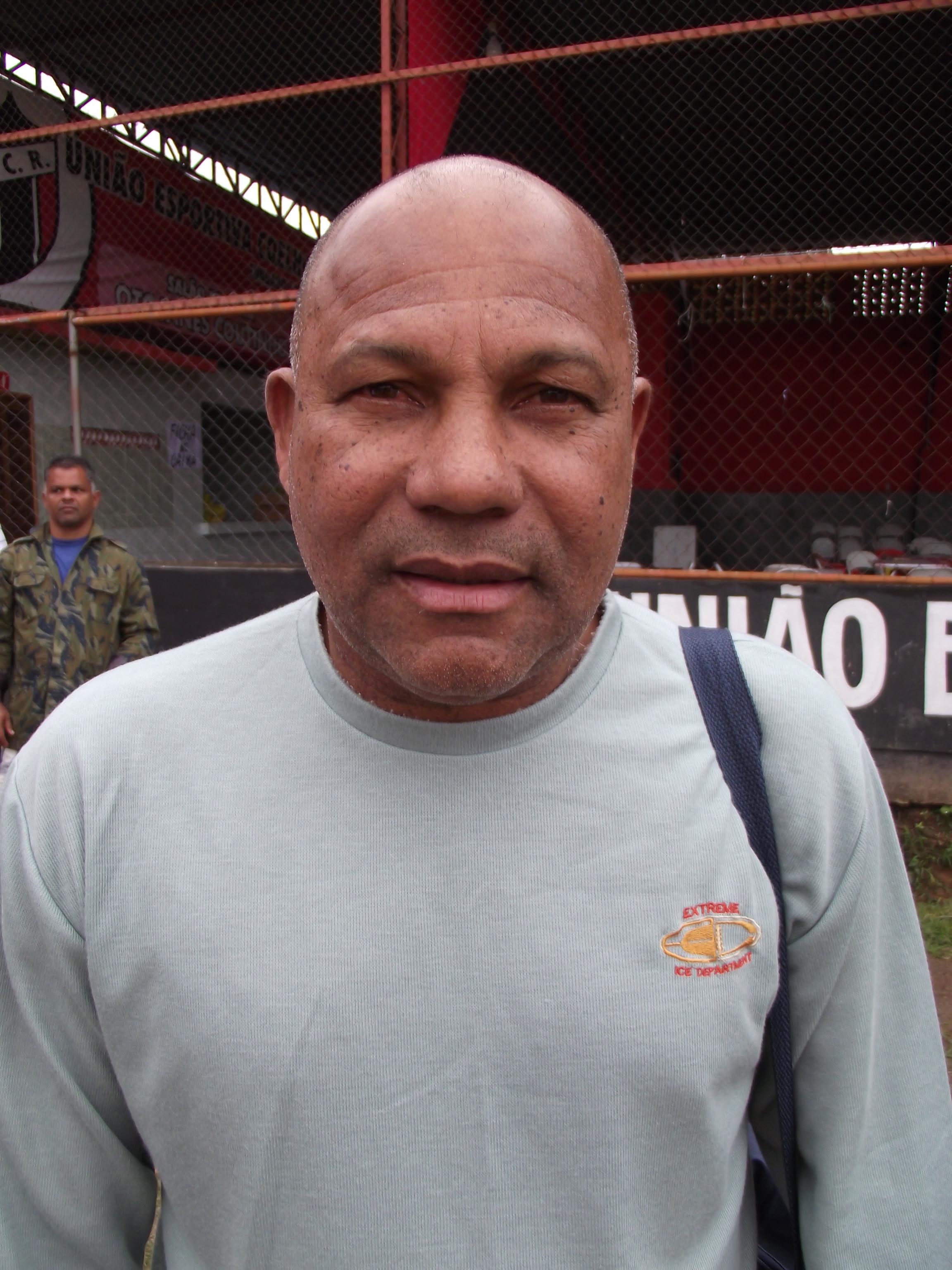

Personal information
- Full name: Edevaldo de Freitas
- Date of birth: 28 January 1958 (age 68)
- Place of birth: Campos dos Goytacazes, Brazil
- Height: 1.78 m (5 ft 10 in)
- Position: Defender

Senior career*
Years	Team	Apps	(Gls)
1979–1981	Fluminense		
1981–1983	Internacional		
1983–1985	Vasco da Gama		
1985–1986	Porto		
1986	Botafogo-SP		
1986	Náutico		
1987	Bangu		
1988	Vila Nova		
1989	America		
1991	Castelo		
1992	Izabelense		
1993	Portuguesa da Ilha		
1994	Muniz Freire		
1995	Barra		
1995–1996	Portuguesa da Ilha		
1996–1997	Mesquita		

International career
1977	Brazil U-20		
1980–1982	Brazil		
- * Club domestic league appearances and goals

Edevaldo de Freitas (born 28 January 1958), known as Edevaldo, is a former Brazilian footballer who played as a right-back.

During his career (1979–1998), he played for several clubs, including Fluminense, Internacional, Vasco da Gama, Botafogo and in Portugal with FC Porto.

He won one Rio de Janeiro State League in 1980 and one João Gamper Trophy in Spain, 1982. For the Brazil national football team he got 18 international caps, from October 1980 to July 1982, scored one goal against Argentina in the 1980 Mundialito. He also played for Brazil at the 1982 FIFA World Cup finals. With the FC Porto, he won the 1985–86 Portuguese championship.

== Honours ==
Fluminense

- Campeonato Carioca: 1980

Internacional

- Joan Gamper Trophy: 1982

Porto

- Primeira Liga: 1985-86
