= Rodolfo Rodríguez (Uruguayan footballer) =

Uruguayan footballer (born 1956)

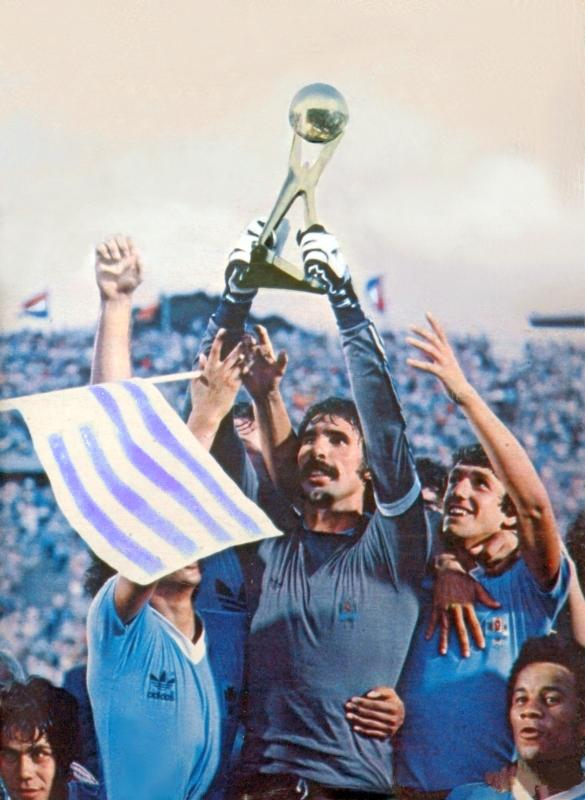
- Rodríguez lifting the Mundialito trophy in 1980

Personal information
- Full name: Rodolfo Sergio Rodríguez Rodríguez
- Date of birth: 20 January 1956 (age 70)
- Place of birth: Montevideo, Uruguay
- Height: 1.91 m (6 ft 3 in)
- Position: Goalkeeper

Youth career
- 1971–1974: Cerro

Senior career*
Years	Team	Apps	(Gls)
1974–1976	Cerro	27	(0)
1976–1983	Nacional	236	(0)
1984–1987	Santos	57	(0)
1988–1989	Sporting CP	16	(0)
1990–1992	Portuguesa	25	(0)
1992–1994	Bahia	13	(0)
Total		374	(0)

International career
1976–1986	Uruguay	79	(0)
Medal record
Men's football
Representing Uruguay
World Champions’ Gold Cup
Winner	1980 Uruguay
Copa América
Winner	1983
CONMEBOL–UEFA Cup of Champions
Runner-up	1985 France
- * Club domestic league appearances and goals

Rodolfo Sergio Rodríguez Rodríguez (born 20 January 1956) is a Uruguayan former professional footballer who played as a goalkeeper. He was once the most capped player in the history of the Uruguay national team with 78 international appearances between 1976 and 1986.

== Career ==
Rodríguez was born in Montevideo. His youth player career began at Cerro in 1971, but he moved to Nacional in 1976.

At Nacional, Rodríguez started his professional career in 1976. He played with the team until 1984, having won the Uruguayan Championship in 1977, 1980 and 1983, the Copa Libertadores in 1980 and the Copa Intercontinental also in 1980.

In 1984, he joined Santos in Brazil. At Santos he won the São Paulo State Championship in 1984. He stayed with the club until 1987.

Rodríguez then moved to Sporting CP but only stayed there for one season (1988–1989). He returned to Brazil in 1990 to play at Portuguesa. Two years later he left Portuguesa to join Bahia with which he won two Bahia State Championships in 1993 and 1994.

As goalkeeper for the Uruguay national team, Rodolfo Rodríguez won the 50th anniversary tournament of the first World Cup, the 1980 Mundialito, and the Copa América in 1983. He also took part with the national squads that played in the 1979 Copa América, and the 1986 FIFA World Cup.

He retired in 1994 as the most capped Uruguayan player ever, having played 78 officially recognised games for his national side.

== Honours ==
Nacional

- Primera División: 1977, 1980, 1983
- Copa Libertadores: 1980
- Intercontinental Cup: 1980

Santos

- Campeonato Paulista: 1984

Bahia

- Campeonato Baiano: 1993, 1994

Uruguay Youth

- U-20 South American Championship: 1975

Uruguay

- Mundialito: 1980
- Copa América: 1983
