= 1980 World Champions' Gold Cup =

1980–81 World Champions' Gold Cup
Copa de Oro de Campeones Mundiales Uruguay 1980–81
- Charrúa, the official mascot

Tournament details
- Host country: Uruguay
- Dates: 30 December 1980 – 10 January 1981
- Teams: 6 (from 2 confederations)
- Venue: 1

Final positions
- Champions: Uruguay
- Runners-up: Brazil

Tournament statistics
- Matches played: 7
- Goals scored: 19 (2.71 per match)
- Attendance: 376,250 (53,750 per match)
- Top scorer(s): (Uruguay) Waldemar Victorino (3 goals)
- Best player: (Uruguay) Ruben Paz

The 1980–81 World Champions' Gold Cup (Spanish for "Copa de Oro de Campeones Mundiales"), also known as Mundialito ("Little World Cup") or FIFA 1980 Gold Cup, was an international football tournament organized by the Uruguayan Football Association and granted official status by FIFA and recognized before its inception by then FIFA President João Havelange. It was a championship of the previous FIFA World Cup champions to get a Champion of the Champions to commemorate the 50th anniversary of the FIFA World Cup. At the July 4, 1980 FIFA congress, the president publicly stated: "At FIFA we have welcomed the initiative of the Uruguayan Football Association, granting official status to the Gold Cup. FIFA actively participates in the organization and offers its experience." The tournament was held at the Centenario Stadium in Montevideo, Uruguay, where the World Cup began, from 30 December 1980 to 10 January 1981.

The tournament gathered the national teams of Uruguay, Italy, West Germany, Brazil, and Argentina, five of the six World Cup-winning nations at the time, with the addition of the Netherlands –1974 and 1978 World Cup runners-up– who had been invited to replace England, who declined the invitation due to scheduling conflicts. After the final, FIFA celebrated the success of the tournament via their official newsletter, officially declaring Uruguay as "champions of all world champions".

== Venue ==
The host Country of the Champions of World Cup Champions was Uruguay

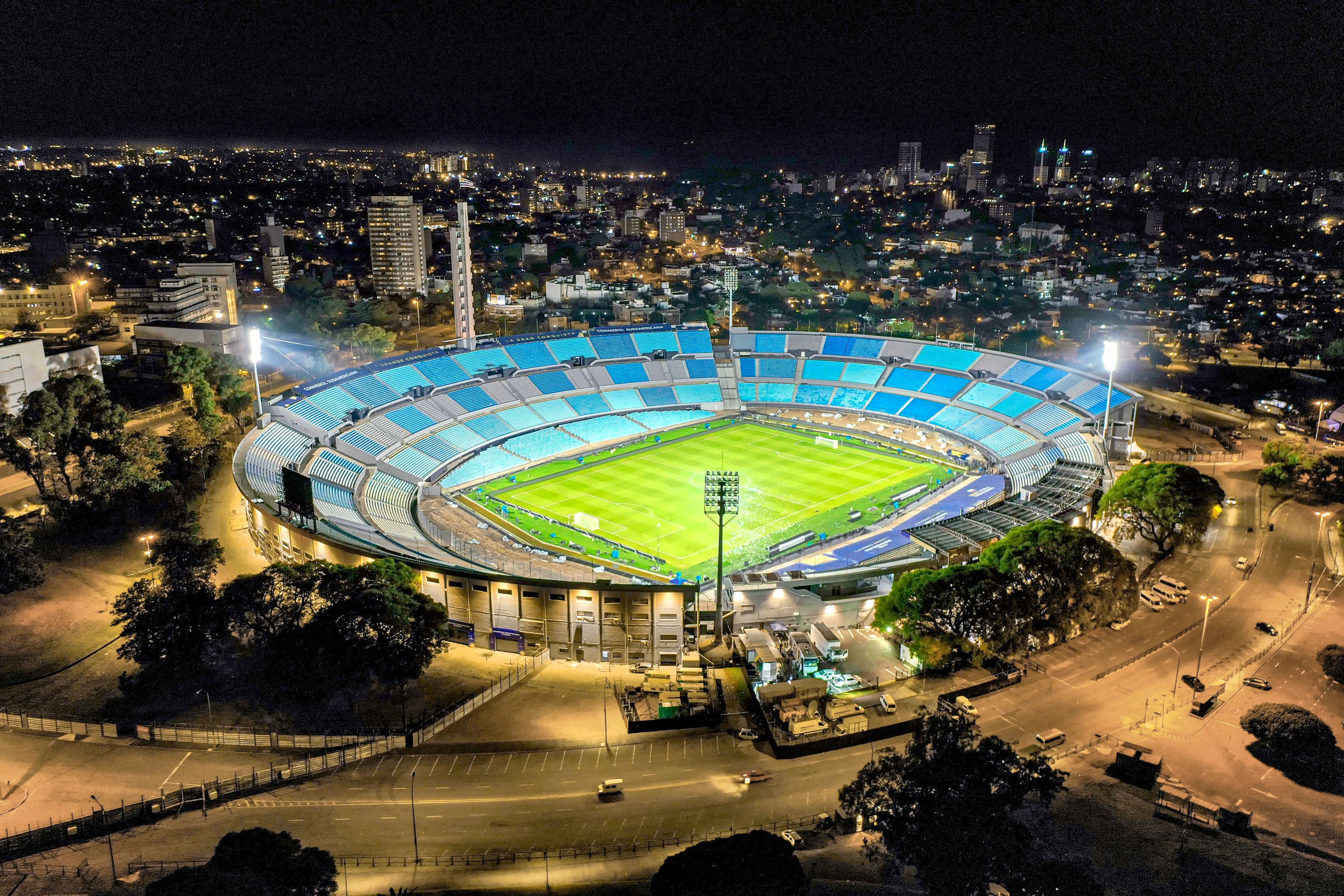
Centrario Stadium Montevideo

== Participating teams ==
Team	Notes
Uruguay	Hosts, 2-time Olympic champions (1924, 1928) and 1930 and 1950 FIFA World Cup champions.
Italy	1934 and 1938 FIFA World Cup champions
West Germany	1954 and 1974 FIFA World Cup champions
Brazil	1958, 1962, and 1970 FIFA World Cup champions
Argentina	1978 and reigning FIFA World Cup champions
Netherlands	1974 and 1978 FIFA World Cup runners-up, replacing England (1966 FIFA World Cup champions)

== Format ==
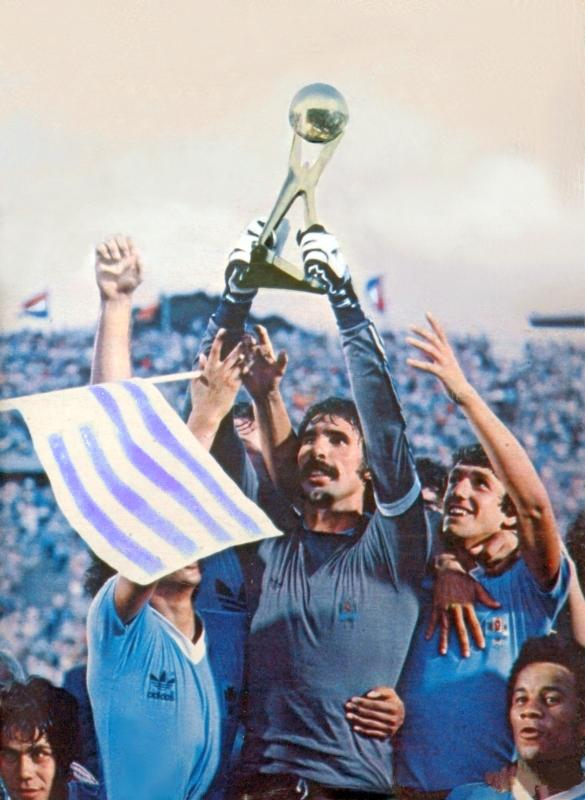
Uruguayan goalkeeper Rodolfo Rodríguez raising the Mundialito trophy

The six teams were distributed in two groups of three: Group A was composed of the Netherlands, Italy, and Uruguay; Group B consisted of Argentina, Brazil, and West Germany. The winners of each group faced each other to decide the tournament winner.

== Squads ==
Each team had a squad of 18 players (two of which had to be goalkeepers).

== Outcome ==
Uruguay and Brazil won their respective groups and played the final, with Uruguay defeating Brazil 2–1 with a late goal, the same result that had occurred 30 years earlier between the two teams in the deciding match of the 1950 World Cup. Uruguay's coach during the Mundialito, Roque Máspoli, had also been Uruguay's goalkeeper in the 1950 final-match. FIFA deemed the event a big success, and formally announced Uruguay as the first, "Champions of world champions." In Europe, Dutch manager Jan Zwartkruis resigned from his position as soon as he returned to the Netherlands, while Leopoldo Luque and Rainer Bonhof never represented their countries again.

== Group stage ==
=== Group A ===
Pos	Team	Pld	W	D	L	GF	GA	GD	Pts	Qualification
1	Uruguay	2	2	0	0	4	0	+4	4	Final
2	Italy	2	0	1	1	1	3	−2	1	
3	Netherlands	2	0	1	1	1	3	−2	1	

Rules for classification:
1. Points
2. Goal difference
3. Number of goals scored
4. Drawing of lots
30 December 1980

Uruguay	2–0	Netherlands
Ramos 31'; Victorino 45'

Estadio Centenario, Montevideo
Attendance: 65,000
Referee: Enrique Labo (Peru)

3 January 1981

Uruguay	2–0	Italy
Morales 67' (pen.); Victorino 81'

Estadio Centenario, Montevideo
Attendance: 55,000
Referee: Emilio Guruceta (Spain)

6 January 1981

Italy	1–1	Netherlands
Ancelotti 7'		Peters 15'

Estadio Centenario, Montevideo
Attendance: 15,000
Referee: Franz Wöhrer (Austria)

=== Group B ===
Pos	Team	Pld	W	D	L	GF	GA	GD	Pts	Qualification
1	Brazil	2	1	1	0	5	2	+3	3	Final
2	Argentina	2	1	1	0	3	2	+1	3	
3	West Germany	2	0	0	2	2	6	−4	0	

Rules for classification:
1. Points
2. Goal difference
3. Number of goals scored
4. Drawing of lots
1 January 1981

Argentina	2–1	West Germany
Kaltz 84' (o.g.); Díaz 88'		Hrubesch 41'

Estadio Centenario, Montevideo
Attendance: 60,000
Referee: Augusto Lamo Castillo (Spain)

4 January 1981

Brazil	1–1	Argentina
Edevaldo 47'	Report	Maradona 30'

Estadio Centenario, Montevideo
Attendance: 60,000
Referee: Erich Linemayr (Austria)

7 January 1981

Brazil	4–1	West Germany
Júnior 56'; Cerezo 61'; Serginho 76'; Zé Sérgio 82'		Allofs 54'

Estadio Centenario, Montevideo
Attendance: 50,000
Referee: Juan Silvagno (Chile)

== Final ==
10 January 1981

Uruguay	2–1	Brazil
Barrios 50'; Victorino 80'		Sócrates 62' (pen.)

Estadio Centenario, Montevideo
Attendance: 71,250
Referee: Erich Linemayr (Austria)

Team details

Uruguay
Brazil

GK	1	Rodolfo Rodríguez
DF	15	Víctor Diogo
DF	2	Walter Olivera
DF	3	Hugo De León
DF	6	Daniel Martínez
MF	8	Eduardo de la Peña	(substituted on) 36'
MF	5	Ariel Krasouski
MF	10	Rubén Paz
FW	7	Venancio Ramos
FW	9	Waldemar Victorino
FW	11	Julio César Morales
Substitutes:
MF	17	Jorge Barrios	(substituted on) 36'
Manager:
(Uruguay) Roque Máspoli

GK	12	João Leite
DF	2	Edevaldo
DF	3	Oscar
DF	4	Luizinho
DF	6	Júnior
MF	5	Batista
MF	8	Toninho Cerezo
MF	16	Paulo Isidoro
MF	9	Sócrates
FW	7	Tita	(substituted off) 51'
FW	11	Zé Sérgio	(substituted off) 81'
Substitutes:
FW	17	Serginho	(substituted on) 51'
FW	18	Éder	(substituted on) 81'
Manager:
(Brazil) Telê Santana

== Scorers ==
3 goals

- (Uruguay) Waldemar Victorino

1 goal

- (Argentina) Ramón Díaz
- (Argentina) Diego Maradona
- (Brazil) Edevaldo
- (Brazil) Junior
- (Brazil) Serginho
- (Brazil) Sócrates
- (Brazil) Toninho Cerezo
- (Brazil) Zé Sérgio
- (West Germany) Klaus Allofs
- (West Germany) Horst Hrubesch
- (Netherlands) Jan Peters
- (Italy) Carlo Ancelotti
- (Uruguay) Jorge Barrios
- (Uruguay) Julio Morales
- (Uruguay) Venancio Ramos

Own goals

- (West Germany) Manfred Kaltz (against Argentina)

== See also ==
- FIFA Confederations Cup
- FIFA World Cup
