= Uruguay national football team =

Men's association football team

Uruguay
- Nickname(s): La Celeste (The Sky Blue); Los Charrúas (The Charrúas)
- Association: Asociación Uruguaya de Fútbol (AUF)
- Confederation: CONMEBOL (South America)
- Head coach: Diego Forlán
- Captain: José María Giménez
- Most caps: Diego Godín (161)
- Top scorer: Luis Suárez (69)
- Home stadium: Estadio Centenario
- FIFA code: URU
First colours	Second colours

FIFA ranking
- Current: 20 (7 October 2026)
- Highest: 2 (June 2012)
- Lowest: 76 (December 1998)

First international
- Uruguay 0–6 Argentina (Montevideo, Uruguay; 20 July 1902) (Note: Although the first match recorded by both Argentina and Uruguay was played on 16 May 1901, this is not considered an official game due to the match not being organized by Uruguay's Football Association but by Albion FC on its home field in Paso del Molino.)

Biggest win
- Uruguay 9–0 Bolivia (Lima, Peru; 6 November 1927)

Biggest defeat
- Uruguay 0–6 Argentina (Montevideo, Uruguay; 20 July 1902)

World Cup
- Appearances: 15 (first in 1930)
- Best result: Champions (1930, 1950)

Olympic Games
- Appearances: 2 (first in 1924)
- Best result: Champions (1924, 1928)

Copa América
- Appearances: 46 (first in 1916)
- Best result: Champions (1916, 1917, 1920, 1923, 1924, 1926, 1935, 1942, 1956, 1959, 1967, 1983, 1987, 1995, 2011)

World Champions' Gold Cup
- Appearances: 1 (first in 1980)
- Best result: Champions (1980)

CONMEBOL–UEFA Cup of Champions
- Appearances: 1 (first in 1985)
- Best result: Runners-up (1985)

Confederations Cup
- Appearances: 2 (first in 1997)
- Best result: Fourth place (1997, 2013)
Medal record
Men's football
FIFA World Cup
Gold medal – first place	1930 Uruguay	Team
Gold medal – first place	1950 Brazil	Team
Olympic Games (Note: Only the 1924 and 1928 editions are senior world titles equivalent to a World Cup. After the World Cup was established, football at the Olympics returned to amateur players only, like it was prior to 1924. Since the 1992 edition, the tournament was restricted to squads with no more than 3 players over the age of 23, and these matches are not regarded as part of the senior national team's record, nor are senior national team caps awarded, it’s part of the Uruguay U23.)
Gold medal – first place	1924 France	Team
Gold medal – first place	1928 Netherlands	Team
Copa América
Gold medal – first place	1916 Argentina	Team
Gold medal – first place	1917 Uruguay	Team
Gold medal – first place	1920 Chile	Team
Gold medal – first place	1923 Uruguay	Team
Gold medal – first place	1924 Uruguay	Team
Gold medal – first place	1926 Chile	Team
Gold medal – first place	1935 Peru	Team
Gold medal – first place	1942 Uruguay	Team
Gold medal – first place	1956 Uruguay	Team
Gold medal – first place	1959 Ecuador	Team
Gold medal – first place	1967 Uruguay	Team
Gold medal – first place	1983 South America	Team
Gold medal – first place	1987 Argentina	Team
Gold medal – first place	1995 Uruguay	Team
Gold medal – first place	2011 Argentina	Team
Silver medal – second place	1919 Brazil	Team
Silver medal – second place	1927 Peru	Team
Silver medal – second place	1939 Peru	Team
Silver medal – second place	1941 Chile	Team
Silver medal – second place	1989 Brazil	Team
Silver medal – second place	1999 Paraguay	Team
Bronze medal – third place	1921 Argentina	Team
Bronze medal – third place	1922 Brazil	Team
Bronze medal – third place	1929 Argentina	Team
Bronze medal – third place	1937 Argentina	Team
Bronze medal – third place	1947 Colombia	Team
Bronze medal – third place	1953 Peru	Team
Bronze medal – third place	1957 Peru	Team
Bronze medal – third place	2004 Peru	Team
Bronze medal – third place	2024 United States	Team
World Champions' Gold Cup
Gold medal – first place	1980 Uruguay	Team
Panamerican Championship
Bronze medal – third place	1952 Chile	Team
CONMEBOL–UEFA Cup of Champions
Silver medal – second place	1985 France	Team
- Website: auf.org.uy/mayores

The Uruguay national football team (Spanish: Selección de fútbol de Uruguay), nicknamed la Celeste ("the Sky Blue") and los Charrúas ("the Charrúas"), have represented Uruguay in international men's football since their first international match in 1902 and is administered by the Asociación Uruguaya de Fútbol (English: Uruguayan Football Association), the governing body of football in Uruguay, which is a founding member of CONMEBOL since 1916 and a member of FIFA since 1923. It was also a member of PFC, which was the attempt at a unified confederation of the Americas from 1946 to 1961. Uruguay's home stadium is the Estadio Centenario.

Considered one of the most successful national teams in international competitions and by FIFA as "football's first global powerhouse," Uruguay has won four world FIFA–organized championships, two FIFA Olympic titles and two FIFA World Cups. Their first two senior world titles came at the Olympic tournaments of France 1924 and Netherlands 1928, two events that were directly organized by FIFA as open tournaments that included professionals. In the former, Uruguay beat Switzerland 3–0 in the final, whereas in the latter, Uruguay defeated Argentina 2–1 in the replay match. They then secured a third consecutive title at the inaugural FIFA World Cup in Montevideo, where they beat Argentina 4–2 in the decisive match. Uruguay's fourth title came in 1950 after beating hosts Brazil in the final match 2–1, a match that still holds the record for the highest official attendance for a football match ever (173,850 people at the gate). On account of these achievements, the Uruguayan national team displays four five-pointed stars approved by FIFA on its football crest. Uruguay were unbeaten in world championship matches from the 1924 Olympics until their semi-final loss in the 1954 World Cup marking a 30-year unbeaten streak and winning four consecutive world titles in tournaments they participated in, having chosen to opt out of the 1934 and 1938 World Cups. FIFA officially recognizes Uruguay as Champions of World Champions, following their victory in the 1980 World Champions' Gold Cup (also known as the 1980 Mundialito). This unique designation makes Uruguay the only national team in football history to be formally acknowledged by FIFA with that title. In regional competitions, Uruguay has won the Copa América 15 times, having also won the inaugural edition in 1916, second only to Argentina for the most titles in the tournament's history, with their most recent title in 2011. As of 2025, based on international senior official titles, Uruguay have won the second most major trophies, behind Argentina.

Uruguay has consistently performed well in global football rankings throughout their history, achieving their highest FIFA World Ranking of 2nd place in June 2012. In the World Football Elo Ratings, they have also reached the top spot on multiple occasions. Uruguay has also developed many rivalries through the years, with the most notable ones being with neighboring countries Argentina, known as the Clásico del Río de la Plata based on their geographical location and cultural similarities, and Brazil, known as the Clásico del Río Negro in reference to the 1950 FIFA World Cup final known to football fans as the Maracanazo.

== History ==
=== Beginnings (1900–1916) ===
Historically, football has been a fundamental element in the consolidation of Uruguayan nationality and in projecting Uruguay's image internationally at the beginning of the 20th century.

Uruguay is one of the most successful teams in the world, having won nineteen official competitions recognized by FIFA, a world record at senior national team level. These include two editions of the FIFA World Cup, two editions of the Olympic Games when they were contested by senior national teams and organized by FIFA (at that time, the only global-level football competition), and fifteen editions of the Copa América.

Uruguay was the first national team, along with Argentina, to play an international match outside the British Isles, on 16 May 1901 in Montevideo, with Argentina winning 3–2. However, because the sides were combined teams rather than national selections, the match is considered unofficial. In that game, Frank Chevallier Boutell, president of the Argentine Association Football League, served as a linesman.

A precedent suggests there was an even earlier match, though not between the two countries' national teams, but between representative teams of their capitals, Buenos Aires and Montevideo, on 15 August 1889. Two representative sides from the two capitals faced each other in commemoration of the seventieth anniversary of Queen Victoria of the United Kingdom. Supposedly, the match took place at the so-called New Ground in La Blanqueada and ended with a 3–0 victory for the Buenos Aires team over the Montevideo team.

The first official match between the national teams of Uruguay and Argentina was played on 20 July 1902 at the Albion ground, with Argentina winning 6–0 (to this day the heaviest away win in the derby). Of Uruguay's starting eleven, 8 were from Club Nacional de Football. Uruguay's lineup was: Enrique Sardeson (Albion), Carlos Carve Urioste (Nacional), Germán Arímalo (Nacional), Miguel Nebel (capt.) (Nacional), Alberto Peixoto (Albion), Luis Carbone (Nacional), Bolívar Céspedes (Nacional), Gonzalo Rincón (Nacional), Juan Sardeson (Albion), Ernesto Boutón Reyes (Nacional), and Carlos Céspedes (Nacional). Goalscorers were Bolívar Céspedes and William Poole.

On 13 September 1903, Uruguay won its first match, defeating Argentina in Buenos Aires 3–2 with a team made up entirely of Nacional players.

Their nickname, La Celeste ("the Sky Blue"), dates back to its first international victory in Montevideo on 15 August 1910, when it beat Argentina 3–1 in the first match in which it wore its sky-blue jersey. This kit was adopted as a national emblem in recognition of the triumph shortly before by River Plate Football Club over the powerful Alumni Athletic Club of Buenos Aires, 2–1, using those same colors.

=== First international successes (1916–1924) ===
Uruguay won the first two editions of the South American Championship: the first held in Buenos Aires in 1916 and the second in 1917, in Montevideo.

The Uruguayan national team became the first continental champion, finishing ahead of Argentina in the 1916 Copa América, played in Buenos Aires. The tournament had a round-robin format: a 0–0 draw against Argentina on the final match-day gave the title to La Celeste.

Uruguay also won the following 1917 Copa América, this time as hosts. Once again, the title was decided in the last round against Argentina, and Uruguay prevailed 1–0 to become champions of South America for the second consecutive time.

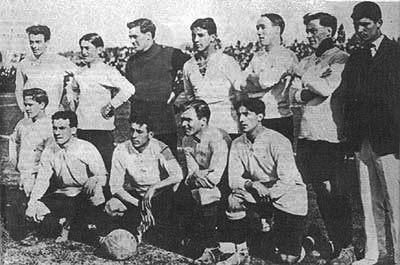
In 1917, Uruguay won back-to-back South American titles – this time as hosts.

In the 1919 Copa América held in Brazil, Uruguay again reached the decisive match. After drawing 2–2 against the hosts, both teams finished level on points, forcing a playoff. The playoff was won 1–0 by Brazil, who claimed their first continental title, with Uruguay finishing as runner-up.

In the 1920 Copa América held in Chile, Uruguay once again arrived at the final match on top of the standings, and defeated the hosts 2–1 to claim their third championship. Argentina's win over Brazil on the same day proved insufficient, leaving the Argentines in second place.

In the tournaments of 1921 (Argentina) and 1922 (Brazil), Uruguay could not secure the title, finishing third in both editions: first behind champions Argentina and then behind hosts Brazil.

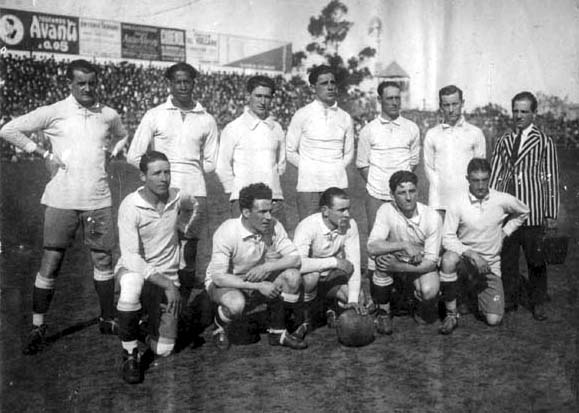
Uruguay's 1923 Copa America had a significant impact on global football, as they decided to enter the 1924 FIFA organized Olympics due to this result.

The Copa América returned to Uruguay in 1923 and 1924. In the 1923 edition, Uruguay and Argentina were level at the top entering the final round. Uruguay defeated their rivals 2–0 at the Gran Parque Central to take the title. In 1924, a 0–0 draw with Argentina on the last match-day was enough for Uruguay to be crowned champions once again, thanks to having more wins in the tournament.

=== Golden Era: Olympic Games and the first World Cup (1924–1930) ===
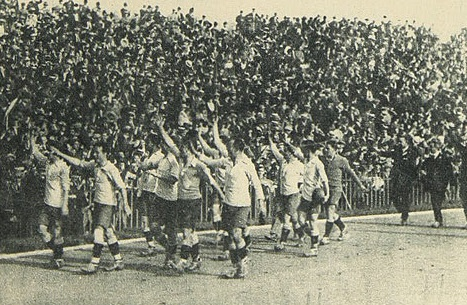
1924 – Uruguay performed football's first Lap of Honour in France after beating Switzerland 3–0 to become the sport's first world champions.

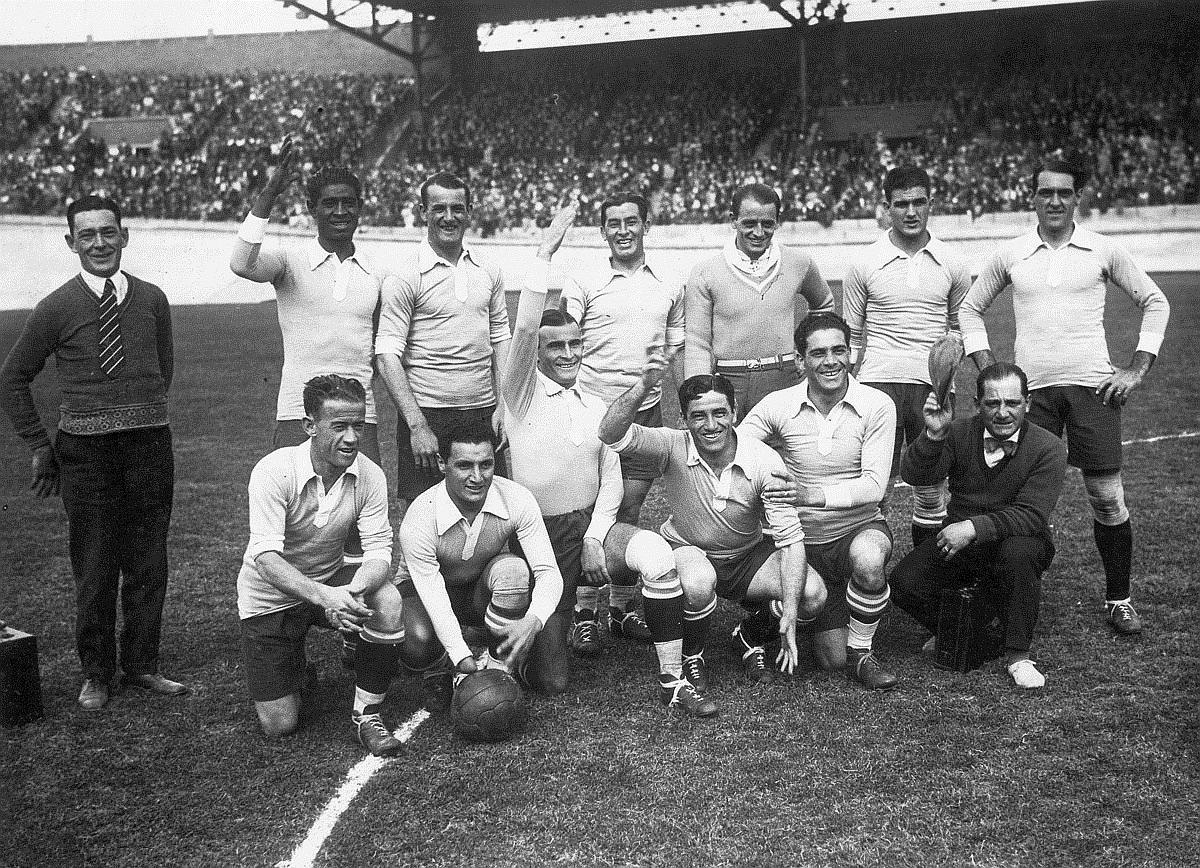
1928 – Uruguay beat Argentina in Amsterdam to claim back-to-back FIFA world championships.

Uruguay was the first South American country to participate in the Olympic football tournaments. Their debut was at the 1924 Summer Olympics in Paris, where they defeated Switzerland 3–0 in the final to claim FIFA's first recognized non-amateur world championship. Uruguay returned in 1928, this time alongside Argentina (winners of the 1927 Copa América). Both reached the final, with Uruguay prevailing 2–1 in a replay after drawing the initial match 1–1. The expectation for this final was so high that reportedly over 500,000 tickets were demanded across Europe.

The Uruguayan national team dazzled Europe with its Olympic performances, earning admiration and respect worldwide. These triumphs elevated South American football to global prominence at a time when the continent was still largely ignored in international sport. The Olympic tournaments of 1924 and 1928 were the only editions officially recognized by FIFA as world championships. This is why Uruguay is allowed to display four stars on its football crest, despite having won the FIFA World Cup twice (in 1930 and 1950).

In terms of continental success during this period, Uruguay won the 1926 Copa América in Chile. They did not participate in the 1925 Copa América in Argentina (won by the hosts), finished as runners-up behind Argentina in 1927, and placed third in 1929.

=== Inaugural 1930 World Cup ===
Uruguay proposed hosting the first FIFA World Cup in 1930, and FIFA granted the country the right to organize it in commemoration of the centenary of the Jura de la Constitución (Uruguayan Constitution), in addition to its world titles at the Olympics. In Europe, this decision was met with disapproval, with arguments that the tournament should be held there, particularly in England, the birthplace of football and site of its subsequent development. There were also complaints about the long journey and high costs involved in traveling to South America.

However, although the Uruguayan government offered to cover all expenses, many European nations still declined to participate. FIFA ignored these complaints, reasoning that the continent was still reeling from World War I, while Uruguay enjoyed peace and economic stability. Thus, the first World Cup was held in Uruguay.

The opening matches of the tournament were France vs. Mexico and United States vs. Belgium, both played on July 13 at 15:00. In the France–Mexico game, Lucien Laurent scored after 19 minutes, recording the first goal in World Cup history.

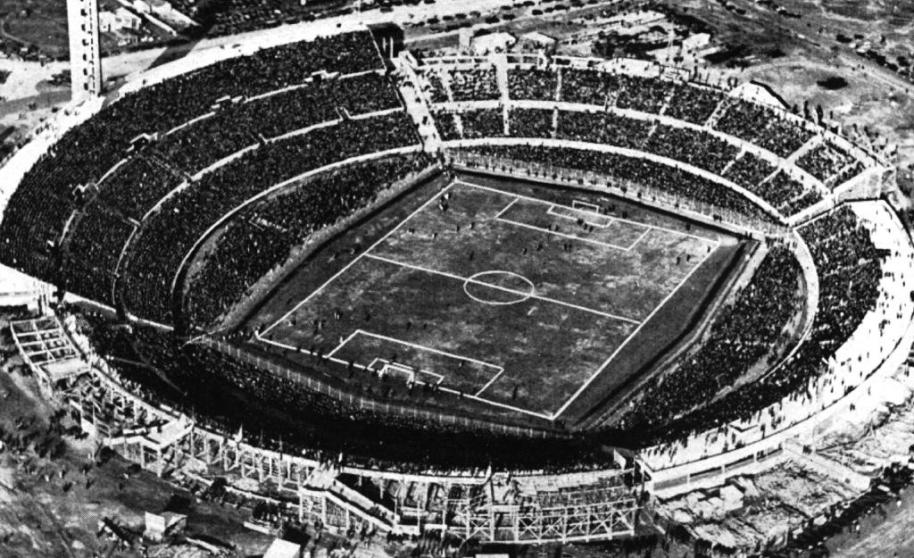
The Estadio Centenario in Montevideo – declared by FIFA as the first Historical Monument of World Football, to this day the only building to achieve this recognition worldwide.

Uruguay, considered the strongest team for its Olympic titles in 1924 and 1928, made its debut on July 18 at the new Estadio Centenario before about 50,000 spectators against Peru. In a lackluster performance, Uruguay won 1–0 with a goal from Héctor Castro, drawing some criticism from the press.

In its next match on July 21, Uruguay defeated Romania 4–0, with goals from Pablo Dorado, Héctor Scarone, Pedro Cea, and Santos Iriarte, advancing to the semi-finals.

There, the Celeste faced Yugoslavia and won convincingly 6–1, with a hat-trick from Cea, a brace from Santos Anselmo, and one from Iriarte, securing their place in the final.

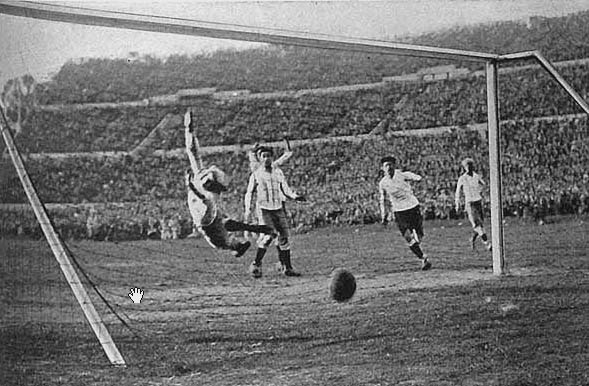
1930 – Uruguay became the first and only nation in history to win three consecutive FIFA world titles after winning the inaugural World Cup

In the decisive match, played on July 30 before 70,000 spectators, Uruguay once again met their great rivals, Argentina, who were also considered favourites. Leading up to the match, tensions were high, with reports that Uruguayans disrupted Argentina's training sessions throughout the tournament.

In the final itself, Dorado gave Uruguay the lead after 12 minutes, but Argentina responded with goals from Carlos Peucelle (20’) and Guillermo Stábile (37’), taking a 2–1 advantage into halftime. In the second half, Uruguay came out determined: Cea equalized at 57’, Iriarte put them ahead at 68’, and Castro sealed the 4–2 victory at 89’.

With that result, Uruguay became the first ever World Cup champion in history and claimed their third consecutive title.

=== 1940s–1960s ===
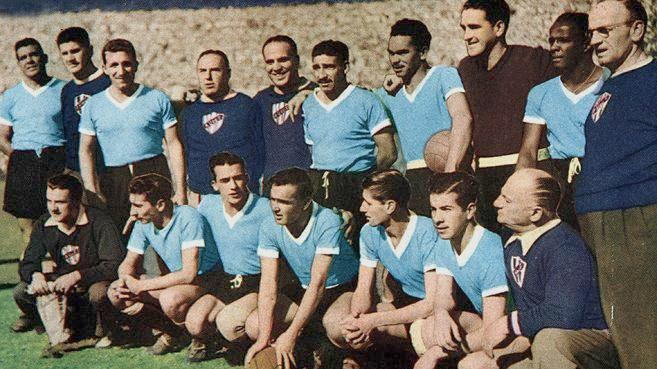
The team that beat Brazil in the decisive match to win the 1950 FIFA World Cup

In the 1940s, Uruguay achieved early success in a decade largely dominated by Argentina by winning their eighth South American championship in 1942. As the World Cup was not being played, this championship became the priority.

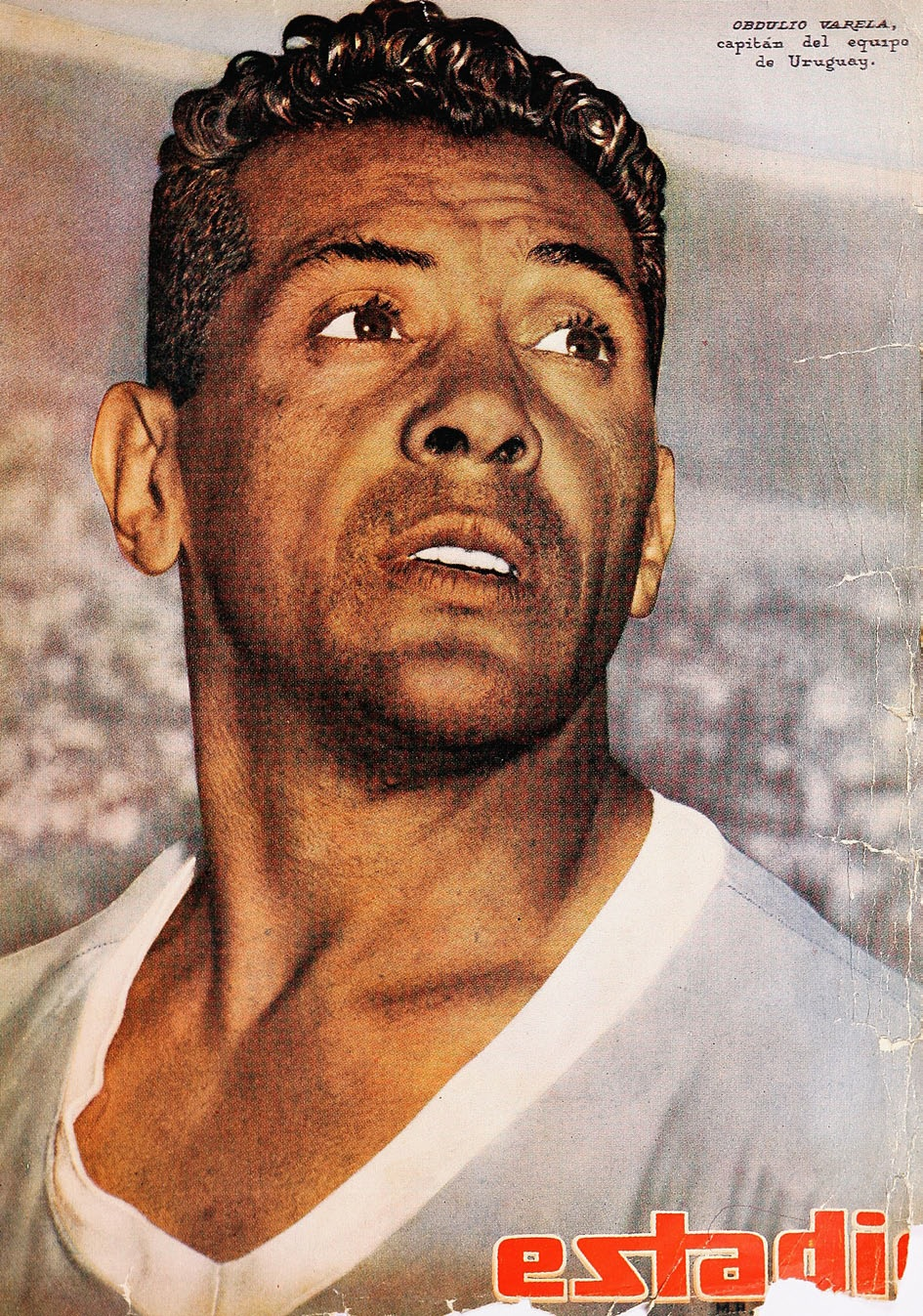
1950 World Cup winning captain, Obdulio Varela

In 1950, Uruguay re-entered the World Cup for the first time since 1930. This time, La Celeste would enter a final-group where they would draw Spain 2–2 and beat Sweden 3–2 en route to the final match against hosts Brazil. On 16 July 1950, Uruguay claimed their second FIFA World Cup and fourth senior world title when they beat Brazil 2–1 from behind in an iconic match known as the Maracanazo in front of a record crowd of 173,850. Historical estimates indicate that the crowd reached well over 200,000. This feat became an integral part of Uruguay's football identity and a source of inspiration for upcoming footballers with each passing generation.

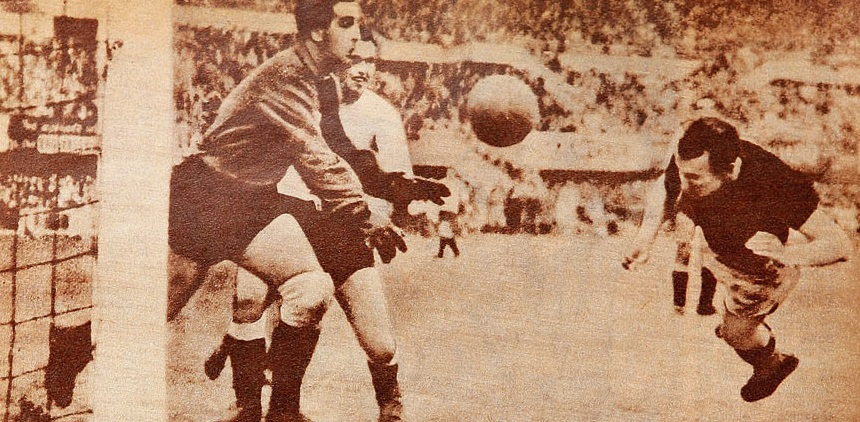
1954 – Uruguay vs. Hungary was later dubbed "Match of the Century" by English magazine Four-Four-Two, and is often referenced as one of the greatest World Cup matches of all-time.

In the 1954 World Cup, Uruguay reached the semi-finals for the fourth time after defeating Czechoslovakia, Scotland and England. The semi-final against Hungary is considered one of the best matches in World Cup history, as La Celeste dramatically equalised 2–2 late after trailing 2–0 at halftime. Uruguay would eventually lose 4–2 in extra-time in what was their first-ever loss at the global stage, a thirty year record that started in 1924.

Afterwards, Uruguay would fail to qualify to the World Cup for the first time in the 1958 CONMEBOL qualifiers after losing 5–0 to Paraguay in Asunción. From there, Uruguay maintained a competitive generation through the 1960s and into the early 1970s with players from Nacional and Peñarol, who had won several continental and club world titles during that time. In 1962, Uruguay had a relatively poor World Cup, being eliminated in the group stage after a dramatic last match against the Soviet Union. Four years later, Uruguay reached the last eight after drawing hosts England beating France in the group stage. A controversial quarter-final loss against West Germany marred what had been seen as a positive campaign. La Celeste would end the decade winning their 11th South American championship in 1967 by beating Argentina 1–0 in Montevideo.

=== 1970s–1980s ===
In 1970, Uruguay advanced to their fourth World Cup semi-final in Mexico, losing to eventual winners Brazil. They would eventually be eliminated in the group stage at the 1974 World Cup, and failed to qualify for Argentina 1978.

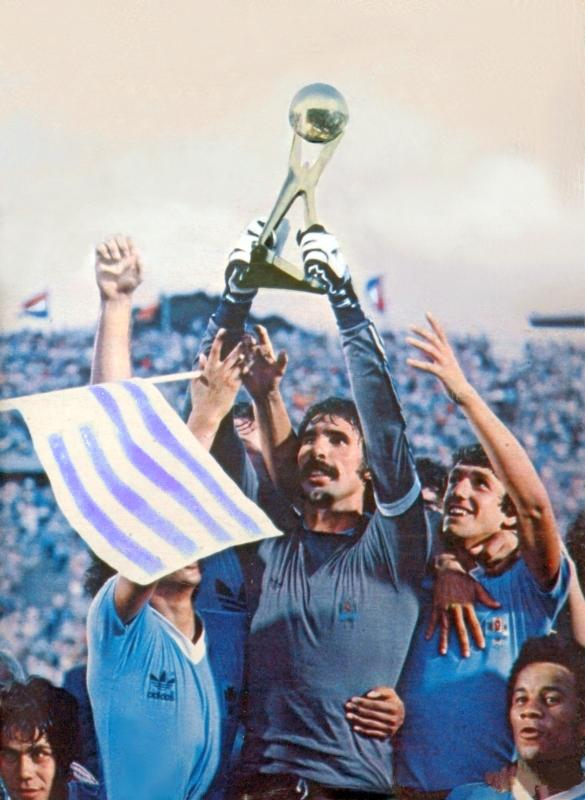
Rodolfo Rodríguez raises the Mundialito trophy won in January 1981

Uruguayan football would then see a resurgence as the U-20 team won four consecutive South American titles from 1975 to 1981, as well as reaching the U-20 World Cup semi-final in 1979. The success of this young generation would bear fruit in the 1980s, which began with Uruguay winning the 1980 World Champions' Gold Cup, a tournament that pitted past World Cup winners together in celebration of the tournament's 50th anniversary. Afterwards, La Celeste went on to win the 1983 and 1987 Copas America back-to-back, before losing 1–0 to hosts Brazil in 1989's decisive title match. After failing to qualify for the 1982 World Cup, in 1986, Uruguay were eliminated in the Round of 16 against eventual champions Argentina after a group stage that included West Germany, Denmark and Scotland.

=== 1990s–2000s ===
In the 1990 World Cup in Italy, Uruguay were eliminated in the round of 16 against the hosts 2–0 in Rome. Afterwards, Uruguay would fail to qualify for 1994 after losing 2–0 to eventual winners Brazil at the Maracanã Stadium. La Celeste would then defeated the world champions to win the 1995 Copa América in Montevideo. Later, Uruguay were eliminated from the 1998 World Cup as they finished in seventh place the first time qualifying was a round-robin tournament.

For the 2002 World Cup qualifiers, Uruguay managed to advance to a final playoff round against Australia to reach the finals. La Celeste would win the decisive match 3–0 in Montevideo to qualify to their first World Cup since 1990. The campaign itself proved a frustrating affair, as Uruguay were narrowly eliminated in the last group match against Senegal after drawing them 3–3, after being down 3–0 at half-time.

The 2006 World Cup qualifying campaign saw another international playoff against Australia. This time, La Celeste were eliminated on penalties in Sydney. This loss led to a profound paradigm shift with the hiring of Oscar Tabarez as manager. From there, Uruguay would reach the semi-finals of the 2007 Copa América, and successfully qualified for the 2010 World Cup in South Africa.

=== 2010s–2026 ===
In 2010, a new generation of footballers, led by Luis Suárez, Diego Forlán and Edinson Cavani, formed a team that finished fourth at the World Cup. Uruguay opened the tournament with a goalless draw against France, followed by wins against South Africa (3–0) and Mexico (1–0) respectively, finishing at the top of their group with seven points. In the second round, they played South Korea, defeating them 2–1 with Suárez scoring a brace, as Uruguay sealed a spot in the quarter-finals for the first time since 1970. Against Ghana, the match finished 1–1, forcing the game into extra-time. Both sides had their chances at extra time but Suárez blocked the ball with his hand in the penalty area, earning himself a red card. Ghana striker Asamoah Gyan missed the subsequent penalty, forcing the game to go into penalties where Uruguay would win 4–2, sending them into the last four. They played the Netherlands in the semi-finals but were beaten 3–2. In the third-place match, they played Germany, again losing 3–2. This placed Uruguay in fourth place for the tournament, their best result in 40 years. Forlán was awarded Player of the Tournament.

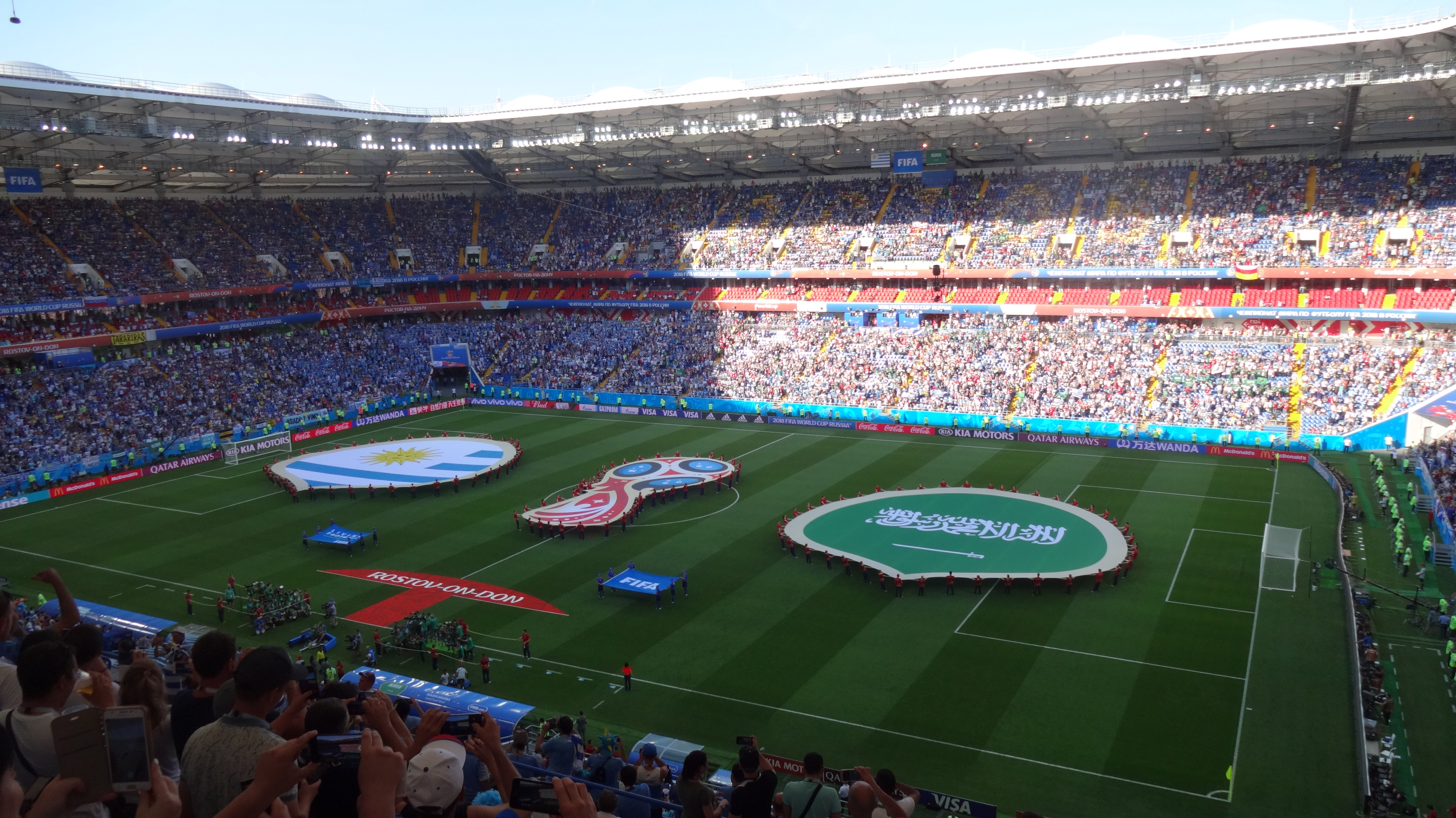
Uruguay vs Saudi Arabia match at the 2018 FIFA World Cup in Russia

A year later, they won the Copa América for the first time in 16 years and broke the record for the most successful team in South America. Luis Suárez ended up as Player of the Tournament.

Uruguay was placed in Group D at the 2014 World Cup alongside Costa Rica, England, and Italy. They were upset by Costa Rica in the opening match, losing 3–1 after taking the lead in the first half. They rebounded with a 2–1 victory over England, in which Suárez scored a brace right after coming back from an injury, and a 1–0 victory over Italy, placing them second in their group and earning a spot in the last 16. During the match against Italy, forward Luis Suárez bit Italian defender Giorgio Chiellini on his left shoulder. Two days after the match, the FIFA Disciplinary Committee banned Suárez for nine international matches, the longest such ban in World Cup history, exceeding the eight-match ban handed to Italy's Mauro Tassotti for breaking the nose of Spain's Luis Enrique in 1994. Suárez was also banned from taking part in any football-related activity (including entering any stadium) for four months and fined CHF100,000 (approximately £65,700/€82,000/US$119,000). In the round of 16, Uruguay played Colombia but were beaten 2–0, eliminating them from the tournament.

At the 2015 and 2016 Copa América, Uruguay, missing banned striker Luis Suárez, were eliminated in the quarter-finals and group stage respectively.

Uruguay then finished second in their qualifying campaign to qualify for the 2018 World Cup in Russia. There, they won their group after three victories, and advanced to the quarter-finals after a 2–1 win over Portugal. However, they were eliminated 2–0 in the quarter-finals by the eventual champions France.

At the 2022 World Cup, Uruguay was drawn into Group H with Portugal, Ghana and South Korea. They started the tournament with a 0–0 draw against South Korea, before they fell to a 2–0 defeat to Portugal. Despite a 2–0 victory against Ghana in their final group game, Uruguay was knocked out of the tournament in the group stages for the first time since 2002, on goals scored following South Korea's shock 2–1 win against Portugal.

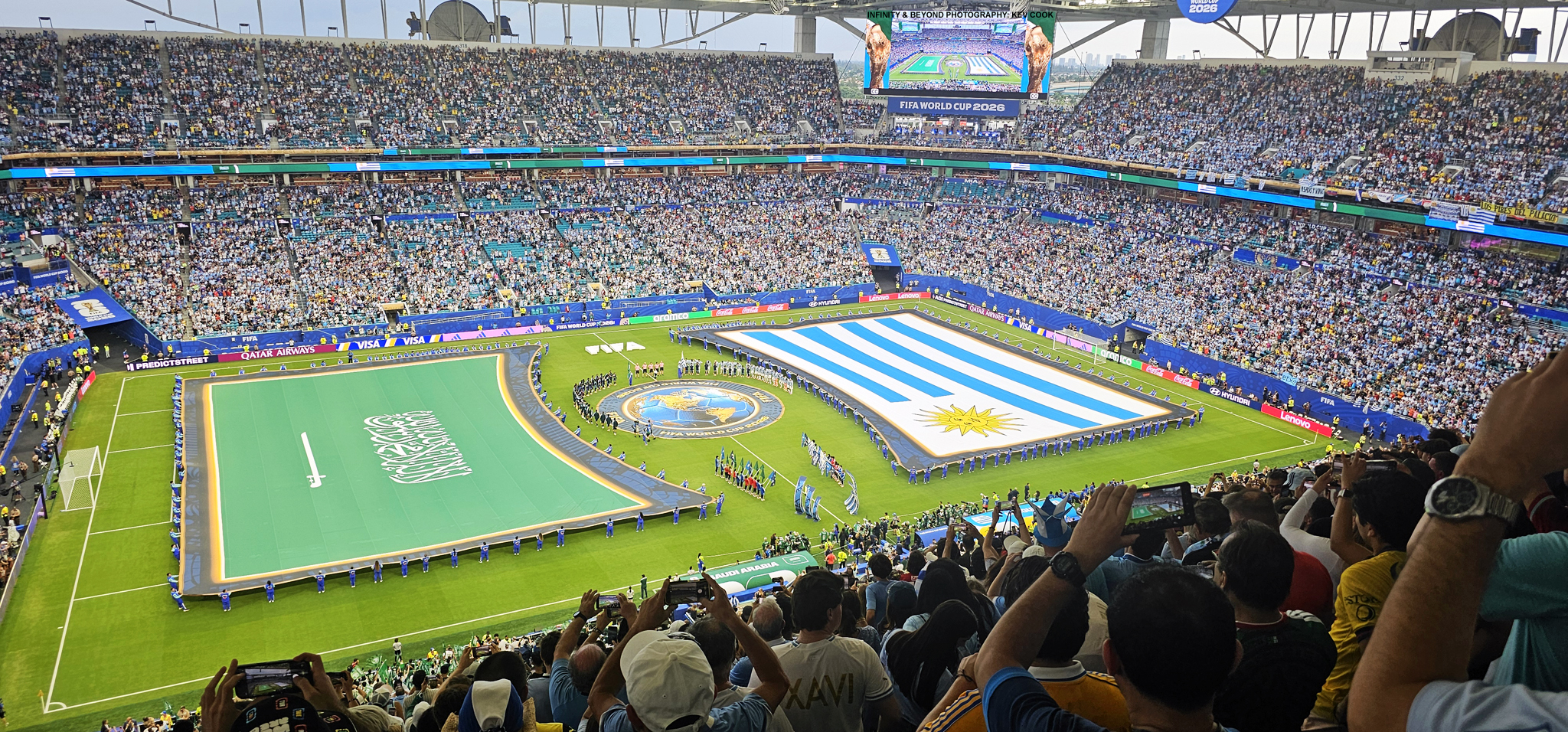
Prior to Uruguay’s opening match against Saudi Arabia during the 2026 FIFA World Cup at Hard Rock Stadium in Miami

At the 2026 World Cup, Uruguay was once again drawn into Group H, this time with Spain, Cape Verde, and Saudi Arabia. They tied their group opener against Saudi Arabia 1–1 despite holding 67% possession, their highest ever in a World Cup match on record. Their 22 shots in the second half was also the joint-most in any World Cup half since East Germany had 24 against Chile in 1974. After drawing Cape Verde 2–2 and losing to Spain 1–0, Uruguay were eliminated in the group stage for the second World Cup in a row.

== Team image ==
=== Kits and crest ===
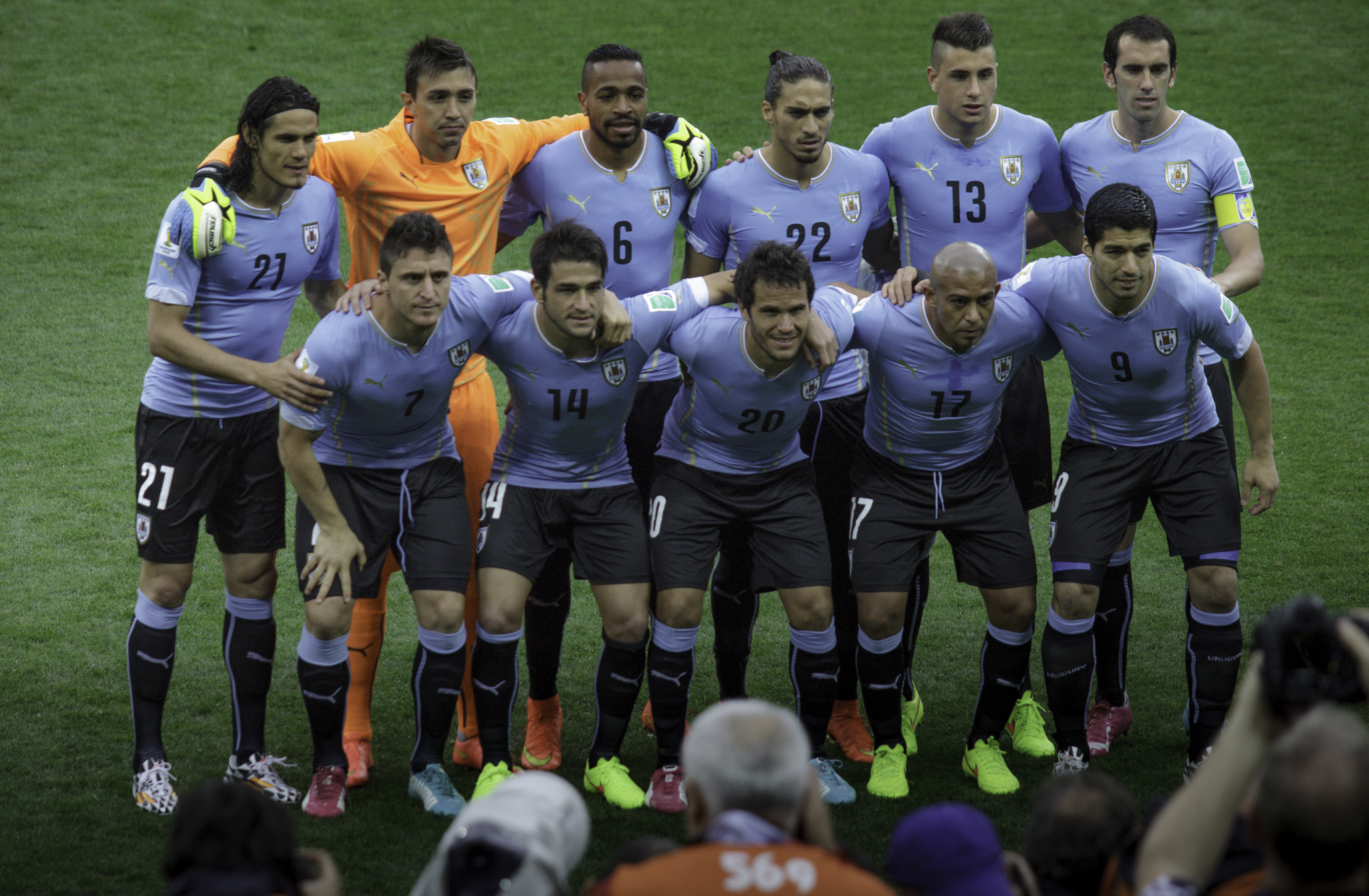
Uruguay at the 2014 FIFA World Cup, wearing the light blue shirt they have worn since 1910

Between 1901 and 1910, Uruguay wore a variety of different shirts during its matches. The first shirt worn was Albion F.C.'s kit, in the unofficial debut of the national team against Argentina in 1901. It was followed by a variety of shirts, including a solid green one and even a shirt with the colours of the Artigas flag.

On 10 April 1910, now-defunct club River Plate defeated Argentine side Alumni 2–1. That day River Plate wore its alternate jersey, a light blue one due to the home jersey was similar to Alumni's. Ricardo LeBas proposed Uruguay to wear a light blue jersey as a tribute to the victory of River Plate over Alumni. This was approved by president of the Uruguayan Association, Héctor Gómez. The light blue (Celeste) jersey debuted in a Copa Lipton match against Argentina on 15 August 1910.

The red shirt that was used in some previous away strips was first used at the 1935 South American championship, held in Santa Beatriz in Peru, which Uruguay won. It was not worn again (except for a 1962 FIFA World Cup match, against Colombia) until 1991, when it was officially adopted as the away jersey.

Uruguay displays four stars in its emblem. This is unique in world football as two of the stars represent the gold medals received at the 1924 and 1928 Summer Olympics, which are the only editions recognised by FIFA as senior world championships. In 2021, after a FIFA employee contacted PUMA about modifying the team's crest, FIFA reconfirmed and approved once again the use of all four stars on the shirt.

1901 (Note: Albion F.C. shirt worn in the first match (unofficial) vs. Argentina due to the most part of the players were from that club.)	1902–03 (Note: Shirt worn in the first official match ever, vs. Argentina in Montevideo in 1902, also worn in a second game in Buenos Aires, 1903.)	1905–07 (Note: Model based on the Artigas flag. This uniform was worn (at least) by a Uruguay representatives (Liga Uruguaya v South Africa and Copa Lipton matches 1905–07).)	1908–10 (Note: Worn (at least) in the Copa Centenario Revolución de Mayo in 1910.)	1910–26 (Note: Worn by first time in a Copa Lipton match on 15 August 1910.)

==== Kit sponsorship ====
Kit supplier	Period
(West Germany) Adidas	1974–1982
(France) Le Coq Sportif	1983–1986
(Germany) Puma	1987–1991
(Italy) Ennerre	1992–1998
(Uruguay) Meta	1999–2001
(Italy) L-Sporto	2002–2004
(Germany) Uhlsport	2004–2006
(Germany) Puma	2007–2023
(Uruguay) MGR Sport	2024
(United States) Nike	2024–

=== Home stadium ===
Since 1930, Uruguay have played their home games at the Estadio Centenario in the Uruguayan capital Montevideo. The stadium was built as a celebration of the centenary of Uruguay's first constitution, and had a capacity of 90,000 when first fully opened. The stadium hosted several matches in the 1930 World Cup, including the final, which was watched by a crowd of 93,000.

== Rivalries ==
=== Brazil ===
The rivalry with Brazil dates back to the 1916 South American Championship, It's also referred to as "El Clasico del Río Negro". Brazil–Uruguay football rivalry is also biggest and oldest football rivalry in South America. Both teams have since competed in several Copa America finals and the iconic 1950 FIFA World Cup final match, where Uruguay lifted their second World Cup in front of a world record crowd at the Maracanã. The only other time they met at the World Cup was the 1970 semi-final where Brazil won 3–1 in Guadalajara. Since the 1980s, the two sides met in several title deciders, such as the 1980 World Champions' Gold Cup final (won by Uruguay), and the 1983, 1989, 1995 and 1999 Copa América finals. Uruguay would win the 1983 and 1995 editions, while Brazil won in 1989 and 1999. Brazil eliminated Uruguay at the Maracanã from qualifying for the 1994 World Cup. Since the 2000s, they have met mostly in the Copa América, as well as the regularly scheduled World Cup qualifiers.

=== Argentina ===
First played in 1902, the "Clasico de Rio de la Plata" with Argentina is one of the oldest international derbies in world football outside of the UK. Both teams have played in historically significant matches, such as the 1928 Olympic football final and the inaugural World Cup final in 1930.

=== Colombia ===
The Uruguay-Colombia football rivalry is a highly competitive and intense clash between two South American teams. It is defined by physical play, tactical battles, and deep history in the Copa América and World Cup Qualifiers. While Uruguay historically leads, recent matches are deadlocked, making every game high-stakes and dramatic.

== Results and fixtures ==
The following is a list of match results in the last 12 months, as well as any future matches that have been scheduled.

Win Draw Loss Fixture

=== 2026 ===
27 March Friendly	England	1–1	Uruguay	London, England
19:45 UTC+0	White 81'	Report	Valverde 90+4' (pen.)	Stadium: Wembley Stadium; Attendance: 80,581; Referee: Sven Jablonski (Germany)

31 March Friendly	Algeria	0–0	Uruguay	Turin, Italy
20:45 UTC+2		Report		Stadium: Juventus Stadium; Attendance: 11,000; Referee: Luca Pairetto (Italy)

15 June 2026 World Cup GS	Saudi Arabia	1–1	Uruguay	Miami Gardens, United States
18:00 UTC−4	Al-Amri 41'	Report	M. Araújo 80'	Stadium: Hard Rock Stadium; Attendance: 62,764; Referee: Maurizio Mariani (Italy)

21 June 2026 World Cup GS	Uruguay	2–2	Cape Verde	Miami Gardens, United States
18:00 UTC−4	M. Araújo 44'; Canobbio 45+6'	Report	Pina 21'; Varela 61'	Stadium: Hard Rock Stadium; Attendance: 64,003; Referee: Espen Eskås (Norway)

26 June 2026 World Cup GS	Uruguay	0–1	Spain	Zapopan, Mexico
18:00 UTC−6		Report	Baena 42'	Stadium: Estadio Akron; Attendance: 45,065; Referee: Ismail Elfath (United States)

24 September Kirin Challenge Cup 2026	Japan	3–1	Uruguay	Rifu, Japan
19:05 UTC+9	Matsuki 11'; Shiogai 90+2'; Ueda 90+6'	Report	M. Araújo 42'	Stadium: Q&A Stadium; Attendance: 44,070; Referee: Alex King (Australia)

28 September Friendly	South Korea	1–4	Uruguay	Seoul, South Korea
20:00 UTC+9	Son Heung-min 80'	Report	Núñez 13', 62'; De Arrascaeta 27'; Kim Min-jae 43' (o.g.)	Stadium: Seoul World Cup Stadium; Attendance: 48,024; Referee: Ma Ning (China)

6 October Friendly	India	1–6	Uruguay	Kolkata, India
19:00 UTC+5:30	Thapa 22'	Report	Núñez 11' (pen.); M. Araújo 28', 59'; Zalazar 53'; Sanabria 71'; Aguirre 86'	Stadium: Salt Lake Stadium; Attendance: 37,307; Referee: Rustam Lutfullin (Uzbekistan)

13 November Friendly	Argentina	1–2	Uruguay	Buenos Aires, Argentina
20:00 UTC−3	Álvarez 73'	Report	Balerdi 48' (o.g.); M. Araújo 53'	Stadium: La Bombonera; Referee: Flávio Rodrigues de Souza (Brazil)

17 November Friendly	Uruguay	5–0	Dominican Republic	Maldonado, Uruguay
20:30 UTC−3	Aguirre 41'; Valdez 70' (o.g.); De la Cruz 80' (pen.); Valverde 87'; Damiani 90+4'	Report		Stadium: Estadio Domingo Burgueño; Referee: Matheus Delgado (Brazil)

== Coaching staff ==
=== Current personnel ===
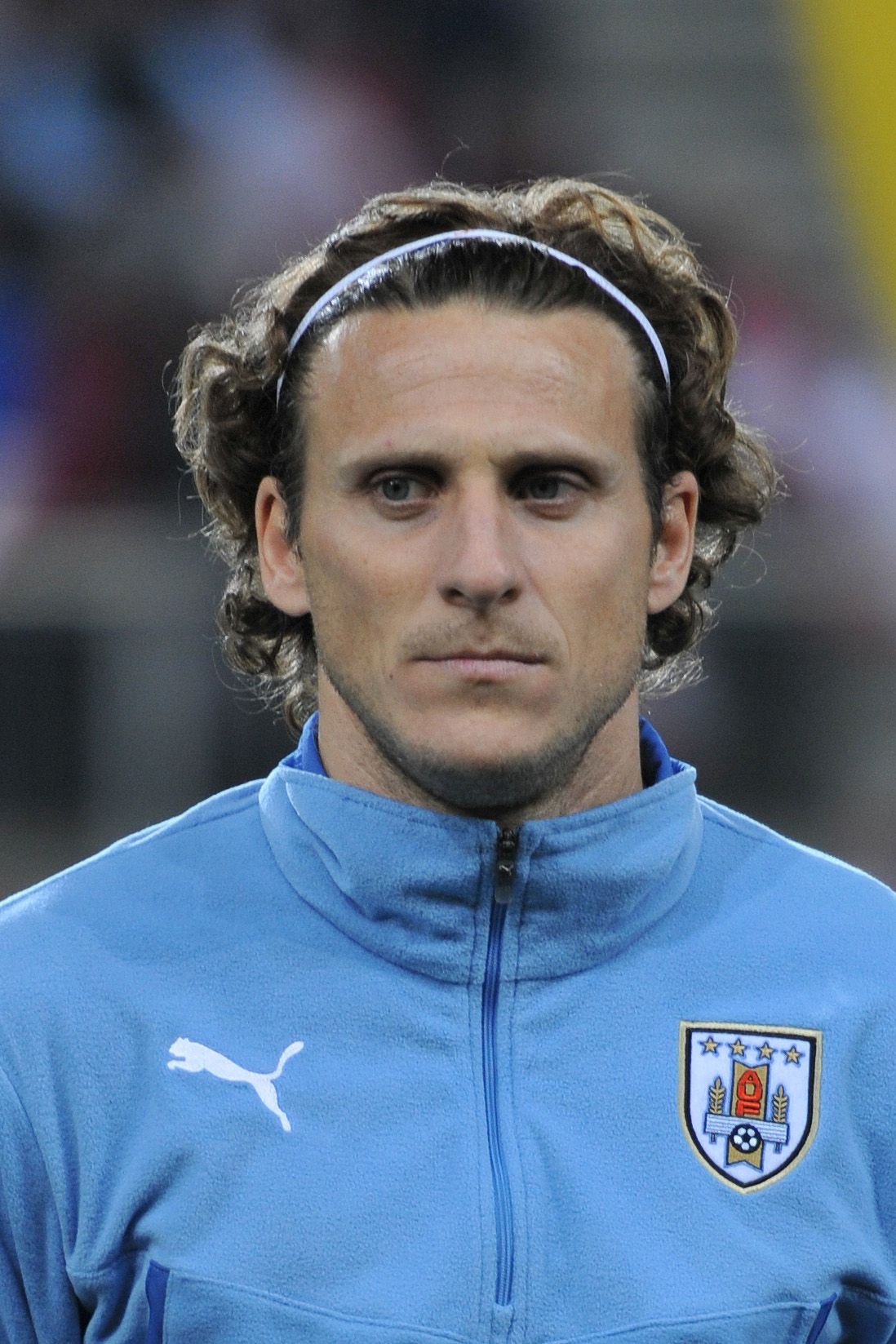
Current head coach Diego Forlán

As of 6 August 2026

Position	Name
Head coach	(Uruguay) Diego Forlán
Assistant coaches	(Uruguay) Santiago Espasandín (Uruguay) Diego Pérez
Goalkeeping coach	(Uruguay) Ignacio Bordad

=== Coaching history ===
- (Uruguay) Juan López (1946–1955, 1957–1959)
- (Uruguay) Juan Carlos Corazzo (1955, 1959–1961, 1962–1964)
- (Uruguay) Hugo Bagnulo (1955–1957)
- (Uruguay) Héctor Castro (1959)
- (Uruguay) Enrique Fernández (1961–1962, 1967–1969)
- (Uruguay) Rafael Milans (1964–1965)
- (Uruguay) Ondino Viera (1965–1967)
- (Uruguay) Juan Hohberg (1969–1970, 1977)
- (Uruguay) Hugo Bagnulo (1970–1973)
- (Uruguay) Roberto Porta (1974)
- (Uruguay) Juan Alberto Schiaffino (1974–1975)
- (Uruguay) José María Rodríguez (1976)
- (Uruguay) Raúl Bentancor (1977–1979)
- (Uruguay) Roque Máspoli (1979–1982, 1997–1998)
- (Uruguay) Omar Borrás (1982–1987)
- (Uruguay) Roberto Fleitas (1987–1988)
- (Uruguay) Óscar Tabárez (1988–1990, 2006–2021)
- (Uruguay) Luis Cubilla (1990–1993)
- (Uruguay) Ildo Maneiro (1993–1994)
- (Uruguay) Héctor Núñez (1994–1996)
- (Uruguay) Juan Ahuntchaín (1996–1997)
- (Uruguay) Víctor Púa (1998–2000, 2001–2003)
- (Argentina) Daniel Passarella (2000–2001)
- (Uruguay) Gustavo Ferrín (2003, 2006)
- (Uruguay) Juan Ramón Carrasco (2003–2004)
- (Uruguay) Jorge Fossati (2004–2006)
- (Uruguay) Gustavo Ferrín (2006)
- (Uruguay) Diego Alonso (2021–2023)
- (Uruguay) Marcelo Broli (2023)
- (Argentina) Marcelo Bielsa (2023–2026)
- (Uruguay) Diego Forlán (2026–present)

== Players ==
=== Current squad ===
The following 28 players were called up for the friendly matches against Argentina and the Dominican Republic on 13 and 17 November 2026, respectively.

Caps and goals correct as of 17 November 2026, after the match against the Dominican Republic.

No.	Pos.	Player	Date of birth (age)	Caps	Goals	Club
1	GK	Santiago Mele	6 September 1997 (age 29)	10	0	(Argentine Football Association) Independiente
12	GK	Ignacio de Arruabarrena	16 January 1997 (age 29)	1	0	(Portuguese Football Federation) Arouca
23	GK	Cristopher Fiermarin	1 January 1998 (age 28)	4	0	(Colombian Football Federation) Atlético Bucaramanga
	GK	Sebastián Jaume	26 June 2004 (age 22)	0	0	(Uruguayan Football Association) Albion
2	DF	José María Giménez (captain)	20 January 1995 (age 31)	102	8	(Royal Spanish Football Federation) Deportivo A Coruña
3	DF	Sebastián Cáceres	18 August 1999 (age 27)	29	0	(Royal Spanish Football Federation) Celta Vigo
4	DF	Ronald Araújo	7 March 1999 (age 27)	31	1	(The Football Association) Liverpool
13	DF	Guillermo Varela	24 March 1993 (age 33)	34	0	(Brazilian Football Confederation) Flamengo
15	DF	Santiago Mouriño	13 February 2002 (age 24)	3	0	(Royal Spanish Football Federation) Villarreal
16	DF	Mathías Olivera	31 October 1997 (age 29)	42	2	(Italian Football Federation) Napoli
24	DF	Juan Rodríguez	30 May 2005 (age 21)	2	0	(Italian Football Federation) Cagliari
25	DF	Juan Manuel Sanabria	29 March 2000 (age 26)	11	2	(United States Soccer Federation) Real Salt Lake
	DF	Joaquín Piquerez	24 August 1998 (age 28)	23	0	(Brazilian Football Confederation) Palmeiras
5	MF	Facundo Bernal	21 August 2003 (age 23)	4	0	(Royal Spanish Football Federation) Real Betis
6	MF	Rodrigo Bentancur	25 June 1997 (age 29)	82	3	(The Football Association) Tottenham Hotspur
7	MF	Nicolás de la Cruz	1 June 1997 (age 29)	38	6	(Brazilian Football Confederation) Flamengo
8	MF	Federico Valverde (vice-captain)	22 July 1998 (age 28)	78	10	(Royal Spanish Football Federation) Real Madrid
10	MF	Giorgian de Arrascaeta	1 June 1994 (age 32)	63	14	(Brazilian Football Confederation) Flamengo
14	MF	Lucas Torreira	11 February 1996 (age 30)	44	0	(Turkish Football Federation) Galatasaray
17	MF	Rodrigo Zalazar	12 August 1999 (age 27)	12	3	(Portuguese Football Federation) Sporting CP
20	MF	Maximiliano Araújo	15 February 2000 (age 26)	35	9	(Portuguese Football Federation) Sporting CP
9	FW	Darwin Núñez	24 June 1999 (age 27)	46	16	(Saudi Arabian Football Federation) Al-Diriyah
11	FW	Facundo Pellistri	20 December 2001 (age 24)	43	2	(Hellenic Football Federation) Panathinaikos
18	FW	Rodrigo Aguirre	1 October 1994 (age 32)	15	5	(Mexican Football Federation) Tigres UANL
19	FW	Agustín Canobbio	1 October 1998 (age 28)	20	2	(Brazilian Football Confederation) Fluminense
21	FW	Federico Viñas	30 June 1998 (age 28)	18	3	(Mexican Football Federation) Toluca
22	FW	Bruno Damiani	18 April 2002 (age 24)	1	1	(United States Soccer Federation) Philadelphia Union
26	FW	Martín Satriano	20 February 2001 (age 25)	2	0	(Royal Spanish Football Federation) Getafe

=== Recent call-ups ===
The following players have also been called up to the Uruguay squad in the past twelve months.

Pos.	Player	Date of birth (age)	Caps	Goals	Club	Latest call-up
GK	Thiago Cardozo	31 July 1996 (age 30)	1	0	(Argentina) Belgrano	v. Dominican Republic, 17 November 2026 ^{PRE}
GK	Fernando Muslera	16 June 1986 (age 40)	137	0	(Argentina) Estudiantes	2026 FIFA World Cup ^{RET}
GK	Sergio Rochet	23 March 1993 (age 33)	36	0	(Brazil) Internacional	2026 FIFA World Cup
DF	Nahitan Nández	28 December 1995 (age 30)	74	0	(Saudi Arabia) Al-Qadsiah	v. Dominican Republic, 17 November 2026 ^{PRE}
DF	Santiago Bueno	9 November 1998 (age 28)	8	0	(Mexico) América	v. Dominican Republic, 17 November 2026 ^{PRE}
DF	Lucas Olaza	21 July 1994 (age 32)	7	0	(Russia) Krasnodar	v. Dominican Republic, 17 November 2026 ^{PRE}
DF	Nicolás Marichal	17 March 2001 (age 25)	5	0	(Russia) Dynamo Moscow	v. Dominican Republic, 17 November 2026 ^{PRE}
DF	Kevin Amaro	3 March 2004 (age 22)	3	0	(Belgium) Genk	v. Dominican Republic, 17 November 2026 ^{PRE}
DF	Alexander Barboza	16 March 1995 (age 31)	0	0	(Brazil) Palmeiras	v. Dominican Republic, 17 November 2026 ^{PRE}
DF	Federico Pereira	24 February 2000 (age 26)	0	0	(Mexico) Toluca	v. Dominican Republic, 17 November 2026 ^{PRE}
DF	Marcelo Saracchi	23 April 1998 (age 28)	11	0	(United States) Houston Dynamo	v. India, 6 October 2026 ^{PRE}
DF	José Luis Rodríguez	14 March 1997 (age 29)	5	0	(Brazil) Vasco da Gama	v. India, 6 October 2026 ^{PRE}
DF	Sebastián Boselli	4 December 2003 (age 22)	0	0	(Spain) Getafe	v. India, 6 October 2026 ^{PRE}
DF	Matías Viña	9 November 1997 (age 29)	44	1	(Brazil) Cruzeiro	2026 FIFA World Cup
MF	Emiliano Martínez	17 August 1999 (age 27)	11	0	(Brazil) Palmeiras	v. Dominican Republic, 17 November 2026 ^{PRE}
MF	Nicolás Fonseca	19 October 1998 (age 28)	7	0	(Brazil) Coritiba	v. Dominican Republic, 17 November 2026 ^{PRE}
MF	Santiago Homenchenko	30 August 2003 (age 23)	0	0	(Mexico) Querétaro	v. India, 6 October 2026 ^{PRE}
MF	Manuel Ugarte	11 April 2001 (age 25)	39	1	(England) Manchester United	2026 FIFA World Cup
FW	Brian Rodríguez	20 May 2000 (age 26)	37	4	(Mexico) América	v. Dominican Republic, 17 November 2026 ^{PRE}
FW	Diego Rossi	5 March 1998 (age 28)	7	1	(Mexico) Monterrey	v. Dominican Republic, 17 November 2026 ^{PRE}
FW	Miguel Merentiel	24 February 1996 (age 30)	1	0	(Argentina) Boca Juniors	v. Dominican Republic, 17 November 2026 ^{PRE}
FW	Álvaro Rodríguez	14 July 2004 (age 22)	0	0	(England) Bournemouth	v. Dominican Republic, 17 November 2026 ^{PRE}
FW	Agustín Álvarez	19 May 2001 (age 25)	6	1	(Argentina) Talleres	v. India, 6 October 2026 ^{PRE}
FW	Luciano Rodríguez	16 July 2003 (age 23)	5	0	(Brazil) Cruzeiro	v. India, 6 October 2026 ^{PRE}
FW	Matías Abaldo	2 April 2004 (age 22)	0	0	(Argentina) Independiente	v. India, 6 October 2026 ^{PRE}
FW	Lucas Villalba	11 May 2001 (age 25)	0	0	(Brazil) Botafogo	v. India, 6 October 2026 ^{PRE}
FW	Facundo Torres	13 April 2000 (age 26)	23	2	(United States) Austin FC	v. Algeria, 31 March 2026
Notes: ^{INJ} = Withdrew due to injury; ^{PRE} = Preliminary squad; ^{RET} = Retired from the national team; ^{SUS} = Serving suspension; ^{WD} = Player withdrew from the squad due to non-injury issue.

== Individual records ==
As of 17 November 2026, after the match against the Dominican Republic.
Players in bold are still active with Uruguay.

=== Most appearances ===
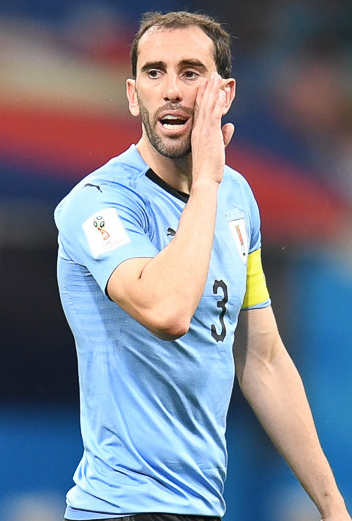
Diego Godín is Uruguay's most capped player with 161 appearances.

Rank	Player	Caps	Goals	Career
1	Diego Godín	161	8	2005–2022
2	Luis Suárez	143	69	2007–2024
3	Fernando Muslera	137	0	2009–2026
4	Edinson Cavani	136	58	2008–2022
5	Maxi Pereira	125	3	2005–2018
6	Martín Cáceres	116	4	2007–2022
7	Diego Forlán	112	36	2002–2014
8	Cristian Rodríguez	110	11	2003–2018
9	**José María Giménez**	102	8	2013–present
10	Diego Lugano	95	9	2003–2014

=== Top goalscorers ===
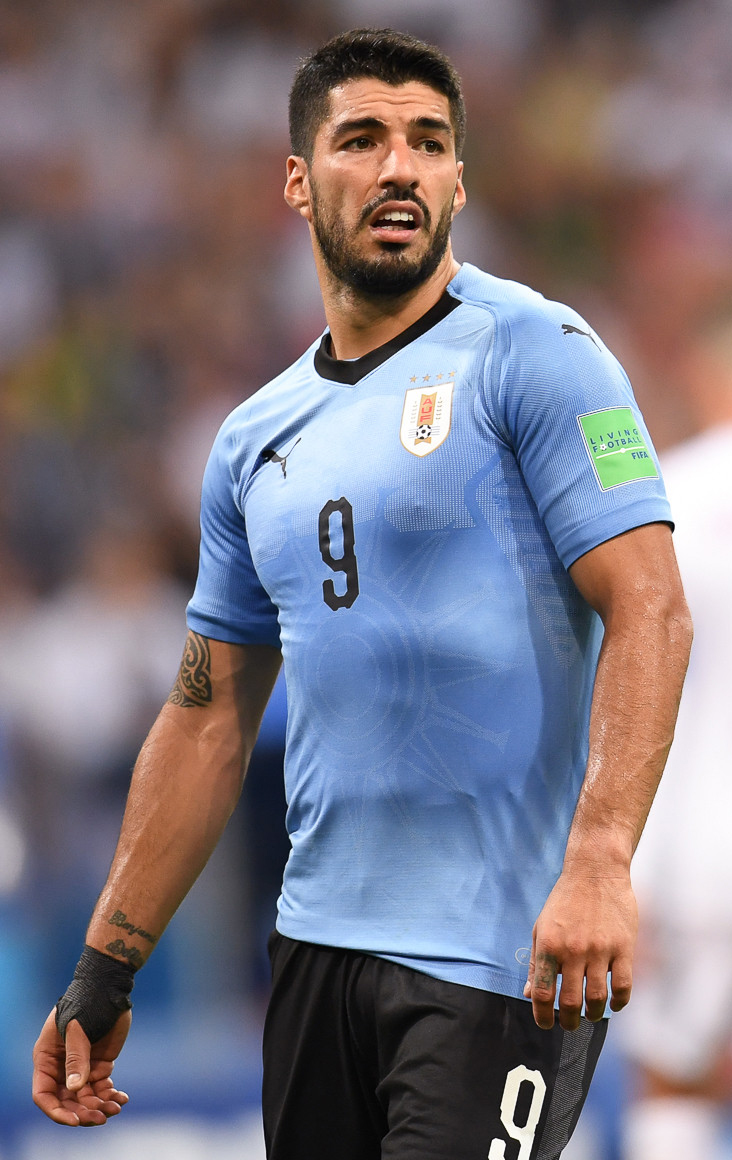
Luis Suárez is Uruguay's top scorer with 69 goals.

Rank	Player	Goals	Caps	Ratio	Career
1	Luis Suárez (List)	69	143	0.48	2007–2024
2	Edinson Cavani	58	136	0.43	2008–2022
3	Diego Forlán	36	112	0.32	2002–2014
4	Héctor Scarone	31	51	0.61	1917–1930
5	Ángel Romano	28	70	0.4	1911–1927
6	Óscar Míguez	27	39	0.69	1950–1958
7	Sebastián Abreu	26	70	0.37	1996–2012
8	Pedro Petrone	24	28	0.86	1923–1930
9	José Piendibene	22	43	0.51	1909–1922
9	Fernando Morena	22	53	0.42	1971–1983
9	Carlos Aguilera	22	64	0.34	1982–1997

== Competitive record ==
=== FIFA World Cup ===
Champions Runners-up Third place Fourth place Tournament played fully or partially on home soil

FIFA World Cup record										Qualification record						
Year	Round	Position	Pld	W	D*	L	GF	GA	Squad	Pos	Pld	W	D	L	GF	GA
(Uruguay) 1930	Champions	1st	4	4	0	0	15	3	Squad	Qualified as hosts						
(Italy) 1934	Refused to participate									Qualified as defending champions						
(France) 1938	Refused to participate									Refused to participate						
(Brazil) 1950	Champions	1st	4	3	1	0	15	5	Squad	Qualified automatically						
(Switzerland) 1954	Fourth place	4th	5	3	0	2	16	9	Squad	Qualified as defending champions						
(Sweden) 1958	Did not qualify									2nd	4	2	1	1	4	6
(Chile) 1962	Group stage	13th	3	1	0	2	4	6	Squad	1st	2	1	1	0	3	2
(England) 1966	Quarter-finals	7th	4	1	2	1	2	5	Squad	1st	4	4	0	0	11	2
(Mexico) 1970	Fourth place	4th	6	2	1	3	4	5	Squad	1st	4	3	1	0	5	0
(West Germany) 1974	Group stage	13th	3	0	1	2	1	6	Squad	1st	4	2	1	1	6	2
(Argentina) 1978	Did not qualify									2nd	4	1	2	1	5	4
(Spain) 1982	Did not qualify									2nd	4	1	2	1	5	5
(Mexico) 1986	Round of 16	16th	4	0	2	2	2	8	Squad	1st	4	3	0	1	6	4
(Italy) 1990	Round of 16	16th	4	1	1	2	2	5	Squad	1st	4	3	0	1	7	2
(United States) 1994	Did not qualify									3rd	8	4	2	2	10	7
(France) 1998	Did not qualify									7th	16	6	3	7	18	21
(South Korea) (Japan) 2002	Group stage	26th	3	0	2	1	4	5	Squad	5th	20	8	6	6	22	14
(Germany) 2006	Did not qualify									5th	20	7	7	6	24	29
(South Africa) 2010	Fourth place	4th	7	3	2	2	11	8	Squad	5th	20	7	7	6	30	21
(Brazil) 2014	Round of 16	12th	4	2	0	2	4	6	Squad	5th	18	8	5	5	30	25
(Russia) 2018	Quarter-finals	5th	5	4	0	1	7	3	Squad	2nd	18	9	4	5	32	20
(Qatar) 2022	Group stage	20th	3	1	1	1	2	2	Squad	3rd	18	8	4	6	22	22
(Canada) (Mexico) (United States) 2026	Group stage	37th	3	0	2	1	3	4	Squad	4th	18	7	7	4	22	12
(Morocco) (Portugal) (Spain) 2030	Qualified as commemorative match hosts									Qualified as commemorative match hosts						
(Saudi Arabia) 2034	To be determined									To be determined						
Total	2 Titles	15/23	62	25	15	22	92	80	—	—	190	84	53	53	262	198

* Draws include knockout matches decided via penalty shoot-out.

=== Copa América ===
South American Championship / Copa América record
Year	Round	Position	Pld	W	D*	L	GF	GA	Squad
(Argentina) 1916	Champions	1st	3	2	1	0	6	1	Squad
(Uruguay) 1917	Champions	1st	3	3	0	0	9	0	Squad
(Brazil) 1919	Runners-up	2nd	4	2	1	1	7	5	Squad
(Chile) 1920	Champions	1st	3	2	1	0	9	2	Squad
(Argentina) 1921	Third place	3rd	3	1	0	2	3	4	Squad
(Brazil) 1922	Third place	3rd	4	2	1	1	3	1	Squad
(Uruguay) 1923	Champions	1st	3	3	0	0	6	1	Squad
(Uruguay) 1924	Champions	1st	3	2	1	0	8	1	Squad
(Argentina) 1925	Withdrew								
(Chile) 1926	Champions	1st	4	4	0	0	17	2	Squad
(Peru) 1927	Runners-up	2nd	3	2	0	1	15	3	Squad
(Argentina) 1929	Third place	3rd	3	1	0	2	4	6	Squad
(Peru) 1935	Champions	1st	3	3	0	0	6	1	Squad
(Argentina) 1937	Third place	3rd	5	2	0	3	11	14	Squad
(Peru) 1939	Runners-up	2nd	4	3	0	1	13	5	Squad
(Chile) 1941	Runners-up	2nd	4	3	0	1	10	1	Squad
(Uruguay) 1942	Champions	1st	6	6	0	0	21	2	Squad
(Chile) 1945	Fourth place	4th	6	3	0	3	14	6	Squad
(Argentina) 1946	Fourth place	4th	5	2	0	3	11	9	Squad
(Ecuador) 1947	Third place	3rd	7	5	0	2	21	8	Squad
(Brazil) 1949	Sixth place	6th	7	2	1	4	14	20	Squad
(Peru) 1953	Third place	3rd	6	3	1	2	15	6	Squad
(Chile) 1955	Fourth place	4th	5	2	1	2	12	12	Squad
(Uruguay) 1956	Champions	1st	5	4	1	0	9	3	Squad
(Peru) 1957	Third place	3rd	6	4	0	2	15	12	Squad
(Argentina) 1959	Sixth place	6th	6	2	0	4	15	14	Squad
(Ecuador) 1959	Champions	1st	4	3	1	0	13	1	Squad
(Bolivia) 1963	Withdrew								
(Uruguay) 1967	Champions	1st	5	4	1	0	13	2	Squad
1975	Semi-finals	3rd	2	1	0	1	1	3	Squad
1979	Group stage	6th	4	1	2	1	5	5	Squad
1983	Champions	1st	8	5	2	1	12	6	Squad
(Argentina) 1987	Champions	1st	2	2	0	0	2	0	Squad
(Brazil) 1989	Runners-up	2nd	7	4	0	3	11	3	Squad
(Chile) 1991	Group stage	5th	4	1	3	0	4	3	Squad
(Ecuador) 1993	Quarter-finals	6th	4	1	2	1	5	5	Squad
(Uruguay) 1995	Champions	1st	6	4	2	0	11	4	Squad
(Bolivia) 1997	Group stage	9th	3	1	0	2	2	2	Squad
(Paraguay) 1999	Runners-up	2nd	6	1	2	3	4	9	Squad
(Colombia) 2001	Fourth place	4th	6	2	2	2	7	7	Squad
(Peru) 2004	Third place	3rd	6	3	2	1	12	10	Squad
(Venezuela) 2007	Fourth place	4th	6	2	2	2	8	9	Squad
(Argentina) 2011	Champions	1st	6	3	3	0	9	3	Squad
(Chile) 2015	Quarter-finals	7th	4	1	1	2	2	3	Squad
(United States) 2016	Group stage	11th	3	1	0	2	4	4	Squad
(Brazil) 2019	Quarter-finals	6th	4	2	2	0	7	2	Squad
(Brazil) 2021	Quarter-finals	5th	5	2	2	1	4	2	Squad
(United States) 2024	Third place	3rd	6	3	2	1	11	4	Squad
Total	15 Titles	46/48	212	115	40	57	421	226	—

=== CONMEBOL–UEFA Cup of Champions ===
CONMEBOL–UEFA Cup of Champions record
Year	Round	Position	Pld	W	D*	L	GF	GA
(France) 1985	Runners-up	2nd	1	0	0	1	0	2
(Argentina) 1993	Did not qualify							
(England) 2022	Did not qualify							
(Qatar) 2026	Did not qualify							
Total	Runners-up	1/3	1	0	0	1	0	2

=== FIFA Confederations Cup ===
FIFA Confederations Cup record
Year	Round	Position	Pld	W	D*	L	GF	GA	Squad
(Saudi Arabia) 1992	Did not qualify								
(Saudi Arabia) 1995	Did not qualify								
(Saudi Arabia) 1997	Fourth place	4th	5	3	0	2	8	6	Squad
(Mexico) 1999	Did not qualify								
(South Korea) (Japan) 2001	Did not qualify								
(France) 2003	Did not qualify								
(Germany) 2005	Did not qualify								
(South Africa) 2009	Did not qualify								
(Brazil) 2013	Fourth place	4th	5	2	1	2	14	7	Squad
(Russia) 2017	Did not qualify								
Total	Fourth place	2/10	10	5	1	4	22	13	—

=== Olympic Games ===
Olympic Games record
Year	Round	Position	Pld	W	D*	L	GF	GA	Squad
(France) 1900	Only club teams participated								
(United States) 1904	Only club teams participated								
(United Kingdom) 1908	Not an IOC member								
(Sweden) 1912	Not an IOC member								
(Belgium) 1920	Not an IOC member								
(France) 1924	Champions	1st	5	5	0	0	20	2	Squad
(Netherlands) 1928	Champions	1st	5	4	1	0	12	5	Squad
(Nazi Germany) 1936	Withdrew								
(United Kingdom) 1948	Did not participate								
(Finland) 1952	Did not participate								
(Australia) 1956	Did not participate								
(Italy) 1960	Did not qualify								
(Japan) 1964	Did not qualify								
(Mexico) 1968	Did not qualify								
(West Germany) 1972	Did not qualify								
(Canada) 1976	Withdrew								
(Soviet Union) 1980	Did not qualify								
(United States) 1984	Did not qualify								
(South Korea) 1988	Did not qualify								
Since 1992	See Uruguay national under-23 football team								
Total	2 Titles	2/14	10	9	1	0	32	7	—

=== Pan American Games ===
Pan American Games record
Year	Round	Position	Pld	W	D*	L	GF	GA
(Argentina) 1951	Did not participate							
(Mexico) 1955	Did not participate							
(United States) 1959	Did not participate							
(Brazil) 1963	Fourth place	4th	4	1	0	3	4	6
(Canada) 1967	Did not participate							
(Colombia) 1971	Did not participate							
(Mexico) 1975	Preliminary round	11th	2	0	1	1	1	2
(Puerto Rico) 1979	Did not enter							
(Venezuela) 1983	Champions	1st	4	4	0	0	5	1
(United States) 1987	Did not participate							
(Cuba) 1991	Did not participate							
(Argentina) 1995	Did not participate							
Since 1999	See Uruguay national under-23 football team							
Total	1 Title	3/12	10	5	1	4	10	9

== Head-to-head record ==
Below is a list of all matches Uruguay have played against FIFA recognised teams. Updated as of 17 November 2026.

Positive Record Neutral Record Negative Record

Team	Pld	W	D	L	GF	GA	GD	Best result
Algeria	2	0	1	1	0	1	−1	Algeria 1–0 Uruguay (Algiers, Algeria; 12 August 2009)
Angola	1	1	0	0	2	0	+2	Angola 0–2 Uruguay (Lisbon, Portugal; 11 August 2010)
Argentina	205	61	49	95	238	327	−89	Uruguay 5–0 Argentina (Guayaquil, Ecuador; 16 December 1959)
Australia	9	4	1	4	8	6	+2	Uruguay 3–0 Australia (Montevideo, Uruguay; 25 November 2001)
Austria	4	2	1	1	7	4	3	Austria 0–2 Uruguay (Vienna, Austria; 14 May 1964)
Belgium	2	0	0	2	1	5	−4	Belgium 3–1 Uruguay (Verona, Italy; 17 June 1990)
Bolivia	49	32	9	8	118	35	+83	Uruguay 9–0 Bolivia (Lima, Peru; 6 November 1927)
Bosnia and Herzegovina	1	0	0	1	2	3	−1	Bosnia and Herzegovina 3–2 Uruguay (Cochin, India; 18 January 2001)
Brazil	81	21	22	38	101	143	−42	Uruguay 6–0 Brazil (Valparaíso, Chile; 18 September 1920)
Bulgaria	1	0	1	0	1	1	0	Bulgaria 1–1 Uruguay (Hanover, West Germany; 19 June 1974)
Ivory Coast	1	0	0	1	1	2	−1	Ivory Coast 2–1 Uruguay (Lens, France; 26 March 2024)
Cameroon	1	1	0	0	4	0	+4	Uruguay 4–0 Cameroon (Tehran, Iran; 13 August 2003)
Canada	3	2	1	0	7	3	+4	Canada 1–3 Uruguay (Miami, United States; 2 February 1986)
Cape Verde	1	0	1	0	2	2	0	Uruguay 2–2 Uruguay (Miami Gardens, United States; 21 June 2026)
Chile	87	49	20	18	150	87	+63	Uruguay 6–0 Chile (Guayaquil, Ecuador; 6 December 1947)
China	6	3	2	1	9	2	+7	China 0–4 Uruguay (Wuhan, China; 12 October 2010)
Colombia	47	21	13	13	67	52	+15	Uruguay 7–0 Colombia (Santiago, Chile; 28 January 1945)
Costa Rica	14	8	4	2	25	19	+6	Uruguay 2–0 Costa Rica (Miami, United States; 4 February 1990)
Cuba	1	1	0	0	2	0	+2	Uruguay 2–0 Cuba (Montevideo, Uruguay; 20 June 2023)
Czech Republic (Note: Includes matches against Czechoslovakia.)	6	4	0	2	9	6	+3	Czech Republic 0–2 Uruguay (Bern, Switzerland; 16 June 1954) (Nanning, China; 23 March 2018)
Denmark	2	0	0	2	2	8	−6	Uruguay 1–2 Denmark (Ulsan, South Korea; 1 June 2002)
Dominican Republic	2	2	0	0	6	0	+6	Uruguay 5–0 Dominican Republic (Maldonado, Uruguay; 17 November 2026)
East Germany	6	1	2	3	4	7	−3	Uruguay 3–0 East Germany (Montevideo, Uruguay; 29 January 1985)
Ecuador	50	31	11	8	115	46	+69	Uruguay 7–0 Ecuador (Montevideo, Uruguay; 18 January 1942)
Egypt	2	2	0	0	3	0	+3	Egypt 0–2 Uruguay (Cairo, Egypt; 16 August 2006)
England	12	5	4	3	16	12	+4	Uruguay 4–2 England (Basel, Switzerland; 26 June 1954)
Estonia	2	1	0	1	3	2	+1	Uruguay 3–0 Estonia (Rivera, Uruguay; 23 June 2011)
France	10	3	4	3	8	7	+1	France 1–5 Uruguay (Colombes, France; 1 June 1924)
Finland	2	2	0	0	8	1	+7	Uruguay 6–0 Finland (Montevideo, Uruguay; 8 December 1984)
Georgia	1	0	0	1	0	2	−2	Georgia 2–0 Uruguay (Tbilisi, Georgia; 15 November 2006)
Germany (Note: Includes matches against West Germany.)	11	1	2	8	12	29	−17	Germany 1–4 Uruguay (Amsterdam, Netherlands; 3 June 1928)
Ghana	2	1	1	0	3	1	+2	Ghana 0–2 Uruguay (Al Wakrah, Qatar; 2 December 2022)
Guatemala	3	2	1	0	8	3	+5	Uruguay 5–1 Guatemala (Montevideo, Uruguay; 6 June 2015)
Haiti	3	1	2	0	1	0	+1	Haiti 0–1 Uruguay (Port-au-Prince, Haiti; 23 March 1974)
Honduras	2	0	1	1	2	3	−1	Uruguay 2–2 Honduras (Bogotá, Colombia; 29 July 2001)
Hong Kong	2	2	0	0	4	1	+3	Hong Kong 1–3 Uruguay (Hong Kong; 9 January 2000)
Hungary	6	3	2	1	10	8	+2	Uruguay 2–0 Hungary (Maldonado, Uruguay; 17 February 2000)
India	2	2	0	0	9	2	+7	India 1–6 Uruguay (Kolkata, India; 6 October 2026)
Indonesia	3	2	0	1	11	5	+6	Indonesia 1–7 Uruguay (Jakarta, Indonesia; 8 October 2010)
Iran	2	0	1	1	1	2	−1	Uruguay 1–1 Iran (Hong Kong; 4 February 2003)
Iraq	1	1	0	0	5	2	+3	Iraq 2–5 Uruguay (Tehran, Iran; 15 August 2003)
Israel	6	4	1	1	15	6	+9	Uruguay 4–1 Israel (Montevideo, Uruguay; 26 May 2010)
Italy	11	4	4	3	11	12	−1	Uruguay 2–0 Italy (Montevideo, Uruguay; 3 January 1981)
Jamaica	5	4	0	1	9	2	+7	Jamaica 0–3 Uruguay (Kingston, Jamaica; 28 March 1974)
Japan	9	4	3	2	24	18	+6	Japan 1–4 Uruguay (Tokyo, Japan; 26 May 1985)
Jordan	2	1	1	0	5	0	+5	Jordan 0–5 Uruguay (Amman, Jordan; 13 November 2011)
Libya	2	2	0	0	5	3	+2	Libya 2–3 Uruguay (Tripoli, Libya; 11 February 2009)
Luxembourg	1	1	0	0	1	0	+1	Luxembourg 0–1 Uruguay (Esch-sur-Alzette, Luxembourg; 26 March 1980)
Malaysia	1	1	0	0	6	0	+6	Malaysia 0–6 Uruguay (Osaka, Japan; 1 June 1985)
Mexico	24	8	8	8	35	29	+6	Mexico 0–4 Uruguay (Denver, United States; 5 June 2024)
Morocco	2	2	0	0	2	0	+2	Morocco 0–1 Uruguay (Casablanca, Morocco; 25 April 1964)
Netherlands	6	3	1	2	9	7	+2	Uruguay 2–0 Netherlands (Amsterdam, Netherlands; 30 May 1928) (Montevideo, Uruguay; 30 December 1980)
New Zealand	2	1	1	0	9	2	+7	Uruguay 7–0 New Zealand (Paysandú, Uruguay; 25 June 1995)
Nicaragua	1	1	0	0	4	1	+3	Uruguay 4–1 Nicaragua (Montevideo, Uruguay; 14 June 2023)
Nigeria	1	1	0	0	2	1	+1	Nigeria 1–2 Uruguay (Salvador, Brazil; 20 June 2013)
Northern Ireland	4	2	0	2	2	4	−2	Northern Ireland 0–1 Uruguay (East Rutherford, New Jersey, United States; 21 May 2006)
Norway	2	1	1	0	3	2	+1	Norway 0–1 Uruguay (Oslo, Norway; 14 June 1972)
Oman	1	1	0	0	3	0	+3	Oman 0–3 Uruguay (Muscat, Oman; 13 October 2014)
Panama	5	5	0	0	18	2	+16	Uruguay 6–1 Panama (Santiago, Chile; 6 April 1952)
Paraguay	79	33	20	26	116	96	+20	Uruguay 6–1 Paraguay (Santiago, Chile; 1 November 1926)
Peru	72	39	16	17	116	65	+51	Uruguay 6–0 Peru (Montevideo, Uruguay; 18 June 2008)
Poland	4	1	2	1	5	4	+1	Poland 1–3 Uruguay (Gdańsk, Poland; 14 November 2012)
Portugal	4	1	1	2	3	7	−4	Portugal 1–2 Uruguay (Sochi, Russia; 30 June 2018)
Republic of Ireland	4	2	1	1	7	6	+1	Uruguay 2–0 Republic of Ireland (Montevideo, Uruguay; 8 May 1974)
Romania	5	2	2	1	8	3	+5	Uruguay 4–0 Romania (Montevideo, Uruguay; 21 July 1930)
Russia (Note: Includes matches against the Soviet Union.)	9	2	1	6	8	15	−7	Uruguay 3–0 Russia (Samara, Russia; 25 June 2018)
Saar	1	1	0	0	7	1	+6	Saar 1–7 Uruguay (Saarbrücken, Saarland; 5 June 1954)
Saudi Arabia	4	1	2	1	5	5	0	Saudi Arabia 0–1 Uruguay (Rostov, Russia; 20 June 2018)
Scotland	4	2	1	1	10	4	+6	Uruguay 7–0 Scotland (Basel, Switzerland; 19 June 1954)
Senegal	1	0	1	0	3	3	0	Senegal 3–3 Uruguay (Suwon, South Korea; 11 June 2002)
Serbia (Note: Includes matches against Yugoslavia and Serbia and Montenegro.)	7	3	1	3	17	8	+9	Yugoslavia 0–7 Uruguay (Colombes, France; 26 May 1924)
Singapore	1	1	0	0	2	1	+1	Singapore 1–2 Uruguay (Kallang, Singapore; 21 May 2002)
Slovenia	2	2	0	0	4	0	+4	Slovenia 0–2 Uruguay (Koper, Slovenia; 28 February 2001)
South Africa	3	2	1	0	7	3	+4	South Africa 0–3 Uruguay (Pretoria, South Africa; 16 June 2010)
South Korea	11	8	2	1	19	8	+11	South Korea 1–4 Uruguay (Seoul, South Korea; 28 September 2026)
Spain	11	0	5	6	8	17	−9	Spain 2–2 Uruguay (São Paulo, Brazil; 9 July 1950)
Sweden	3	1	0	2	3	6	−3	Uruguay 3–2 Sweden (São Paulo, Brazil; 13 July 1950)
Switzerland	4	3	1	0	13	4	+9	Uruguay 4–0 Switzerland (Montevideo, Uruguay; 18 December 1980)
Tahiti	1	1	0	0	8	0	+8	Tahiti 0–8 Uruguay (Recife, Brazil; 23 June 2013)
Thailand	1	1	0	0	4	0	+4	Uruguay 4–0 Thailand (Nanning, China; 25 March 2019)
Trinidad and Tobago	1	1	0	0	3	1	+2	Uruguay 3–1 Trinidad and Tobago (Montevideo, Uruguay; 28 May 2016)
Tunisia	1	0	1	0	0	0	0	Tunisia 0–0 Uruguay (Radès, Tunisia; 2 June 2006)
Turkey	1	1	0	0	3	2	+1	Turkey 2–3 Uruguay (Bochum, Germany; 25 May 2008)
Ukraine	1	1	0	0	3	2	+1	Ukraine 2–3 Uruguay (Kharkiv, Ukraine; 2 September 2011)
United Arab Emirates	1	1	0	0	2	0	+2	United Arab Emirates 0–2 Uruguay (Riyadh, Saudi Arabia; 13 December 1997)
United States	10	3	4	3	11	12	−1	Uruguay 3–0 United States (Colombes, France; 29 May 1924)
Uzbekistan	3	3	0	0	8	1	+7	Uruguay 3–0 Uzbekistan (Montevideo, Uruguay; 7 June 2018) (Nanning, China; 22 March 2019)
Venezuela	35	20	10	5	66	23	+43	Uruguay 5–0 Venezuela (Montevideo, Uruguay; 23 May 1975)
Wales	2	1	1	0	1	0	+1	Uruguay 1–0 Wales (Nanning, China; 26 March 2018)
Total (89)	1020	454	249	317	1593	1230	+363	Uruguay 9–0 Bolivia (Lima, Peru; 6 November 1927)

== Honours ==
=== Global ===
- FIFA World Cup
  - (gold) Champions (2): 1930, 1950
- Olympic Games
  - (gold) Gold medal (2): 1924, 1928

=== Intercontinental ===
- CONMEBOL–UEFA Cup of Champions
  - (silver) Runners-up (1): 1985

=== Continental ===
- South American Championship / Copa América
  - (gold) Champions (15): 1916, 1917, 1920, 1923, 1924, 1926, 1935, 1942, 1956, 1959-II (Note: Extra edition), 1967, 1983, 1987, 1995, 2011
  - (silver) Runners-up (6): 1919, 1927, 1939, 1941, 1989, 1999
  - (bronze) Third place (10): 1921, 1922, 1929, 1937, 1947, 1953, 1957, 1975, 2004, 2024
- Panamerican Championship
  - (bronze) Third place (1): 1952

=== Friendly ===
- Copa Lipton (12): 1905, 1910, 1911, 1912, 1919, 1922, 1923, 1924, 1927, 1929, 1957, 1973
- Copa Premier Honor Argentino (3): 1908, 1910, 1912
- Copa Premier Honor Uruguayo (8): 1911, 1912, 1913, 1914, 1918, 1919, 1920, 1922
- Copa Newton (11): 1912, 1913, 1915, 1917, 1919, 1920, 1922, 1923, 1929, 1930, 1968
- Copa Círculo de la Prensa (1): 1919
- Copa Ministro de Relaciones Exteriores (1): 1923
- Copa Confraternidad Rioplatense (1): 1924
- Copa Héctor Rivadavia Gómez (2): 1936, 1940
- Copa Río Branco (3): 1940, 1946, 1967^{s}
- Copa Juan Pinto Durán (5): 1963, 1975, 1979, 1981, 1988
- Copa Artigas (6): 1965, 1966, 1975^{s}, 1977, 1983, 1985
- World Champions' Gold Cup (1): 1980
- Nehru Cup (1): 1982
- Copa William Poole (1): 1984
- Miami Cup (1): 1986
- Marlboro Cup (1): 1990
- Copa Parra del Riego (1): 1994
- Copa Ministerio de Vivienda (1): 1998
- Tiger Beer Challenge Trophy (1): 2002
- Lunar New Year Cup (1): 2003
- LG Cup (2): 2003, 2006
- Copa Confraternidad Antel (1): 2011
- Copa 100 Años del Banco de Seguros del Estado (1): 2011
- Kirin Challenge Cup (1): 2014
- China Cup (2): 2018, 2019

=== Awards ===
- Copa America Fair Play Award (1): 2011

=== Summary ===
Competition	1st place, gold medalist(s)	2nd place, silver medalist(s)	3rd place, bronze medalist(s)	Total
FIFA World Cup	2	0	0	2
Olympic Games	2	0	0	2
Copa América	15	6	10	31
Panamerican Championship^{1}	0	0	1	1
CONMEBOL–UEFA Cup of Champions	0	1	0	1
Total	19	7	11	37

Notes

1. Official continental competition organized by PFC. It was a unified confederation of the Americas, which was formed by NAFC, CCCF and CONMEBOL.
- ^{s} Shared titles.

== See also ==
- Uruguay local national football team
- Uruguay national under-23 football team
- Uruguay national under-20 football team
- Uruguay national under-18 football team
- Uruguay national under-17 football team
- Uruguay national under-15 football team
- Uruguay national futsal team

== Notes ==
Achievements
Preceded by Inaugural Champions	FIFA World Cup Champions; 1930 (1st title)	Succeeded by 1934 Italy
Preceded by 1938 Italy	FIFA World Cup Champions; 1950 (2nd title)	Succeeded by 1954 West Germany
Preceded by 1920 Belgium	Olympic Football Champions; 1924 (1st title); 1928 (2nd title)	Succeeded by 1936 Italy
Preceded by Inaugural Champions	South American Championship Winners; 1916 (1st title); 1917 (2nd title)	Succeeded by 1919 Brazil
Preceded by 1919 Brazil	South American Championship Winners; 1920 (3rd title)	Succeeded by 1921 Argentina
Preceded by 1922 Brazil	South American Championship Winners; 1923 (4th title); 1924 (5th title)	Succeeded by 1925 Argentina
Preceded by 1925 Argentina	South American Championship Winners; 1926 (6th title)	Succeeded by 1927 Argentina
Preceded by 1929 Argentina	South American Championship Winners; 1935 (7th title)	Succeeded by 1937 Argentina
Preceded by 1941 Argentina	South American Championship Winners; 1942 (8th title)	Succeeded by 1945 Argentina
Preceded by 1955 Argentina	South American Championship Winners; 1956 (9th title)	Succeeded by 1957 Argentina
Preceded by 1959 Argentina	South American Championship Winners; 1959 (10th title)	Succeeded by 1963 Bolivia
Preceded by 1963 Bolivia	South American Championship Winners; 1967 (11th title)	Succeeded by 1975 Peru
Preceded by 1979 Paraguay	Copa América Champions; 1983 (12th title); 1987 (13th title)	Succeeded by 1989 Brazil
Preceded by 1993 Argentina	Copa América Champions; 1995 (14th title)	Succeeded by 1997 Brazil
Preceded by 2007 Brazil	Copa América Champions; 2011 (15th title)	Succeeded by 2015 Chile
