= 1987 Copa América squads =

List of footballers

These are the squads for the countries that played in the 1987 Copa América held in Argentina. The first round was played in three groups of three teams with Uruguay, as defending champion, receiving a bye to the semi-finals.

== Group A ==
=== Argentina ===
Head Coach: Carlos Bilardo

No.	Pos.	Player	Date of birth (age)	Caps	Club
1	MF	Roque Alfaro	15 August 1956 (aged 30)		(Argentina) River Plate
2	MF	Sergio Batista	9 November 1962 (aged 24)		(Argentina) Argentinos Juniors
3	FW	Claudio Caniggia	9 January 1967 (aged 20)		(Argentina) River Plate
4	FW	Oscar Dertycia	3 March 1965 (aged 22)		(Argentina) Instituto Córdoba
5	DF	José Luis Brown	10 November 1956 (aged 30)		(France) Brest
6	DF	Hernán Diaz	26 February 1965 (aged 22)		(Argentina) Rosario Central
7	FW	Juan Gilberto Funes	8 March 1963 (aged 24)		(Argentina) River Plate
8	MF	Oscar Acosta	18 October 1964 (aged 22)		(Argentina) Ferro Carril Oeste
9	DF	José Luis Cuciuffo	1 February 1961 (aged 26)		(Argentina) Vélez Sársfield
10	MF	Diego Maradona	30 October 1960 (aged 26)		(Italy) Napoli
11	FW	José Alberto Percudani	26 March 1965 (aged 22)		(Argentina) Independiente
12	MF	Darío Siviski	20 December 1962 (aged 24)		(Argentina) San Lorenzo
13	DF	Oscar Garré	9 December 1956 (aged 30)		(Argentina) Ferro Carril Oeste
14	MF	Ricardo Giusti	11 December 1956 (aged 30)		(Argentina) Independiente
15	GK	Luis Islas	25 December 1965 (aged 21)		(Argentina) Independiente
16	DF	Julio Olarticoechea	8 October 1958 (aged 28)		(Argentina) Argentinos Juniors
17	FW	Pedro Pasculli	17 May 1960 (aged 27)		(Italy) Lecce
18	GK	Sergio Goycoechea	17 October 1963 (aged 23)		(Argentina) River Plate
19	DF	Oscar Ruggeri	26 January 1962 (aged 25)		(Argentina) River Plate
20	MF	Carlos Tapia	20 August 1962 (aged 24)		(Argentina) Boca Juniors
21	DF	Jorge Theiler	12 May 1964 (aged 23)		(Argentina) Newell's Old Boys
22	GK	Jorge Bartero	28 October 1957 (aged 29)		(Argentina) Vélez Sársfield

=== Ecuador ===
Head Coach: (Uruguay) Luis Grimaldi

No.	Pos.	Player	Date of birth (age)	Caps	Club
1	GK	Héctor Chiriboga	23 March 1966 (aged 21)		(Ecuador) LDU Quito
2	DF	Luis Mosquera	14 December 1964 (aged 22)		(Ecuador) El Nacional
3	DF	Kléber Fajardo	1 January 1965 (aged 22)		(Ecuador) Emelec
4	DF	Wilson Macías	30 September 1965 (aged 21)		(Ecuador) Filanbanco
5	MF	Edgar Domínguez	23 December 1962 (aged 24)		(Ecuador) Filanbanco
6	DF	Luis Capurro	1 May 1961 (aged 26)		(Ecuador) Filanbanco
7	MF	Jaime Baldeón	25 February 1959 (aged 28)		(Ecuador) El Nacional
8	MF	Alex Aguinaga	9 July 1968 (aged 18)		(Ecuador) Deportivo Quito
9	FW	Lupo Quiñónez	12 February 1957 (aged 30)		(Ecuador) Barcelona
10	MF	Hamilton Cuvi	8 May 1960 (aged 27)		(Ecuador) Filanbanco
11	FW	Geovanny Mera	16 August 1962 (aged 24)		(Ecuador) El Nacional
12	GK	Carlos Morales	12 May 1965 (aged 22)		(Ecuador) Barcelona
13	DF	Pablo Marín	22 August 1965 (aged 21)		(Ecuador) Deportivo Cuenca
14	FW	Ney Avilés	16 February 1964 (aged 23)		(Ecuador) Emelec
15	DF	Urlín Canga	29 August 1959 (aged 27)		(Ecuador) Emelec
16	DF	Juan Jácome	6 November 1960 (aged 26)		(Ecuador) LDU Quito
17	MF	Pietro Marsetti	21 November 1964 (aged 22)		(Ecuador) LDU Quito
18	MF	Galo Vásquez	3 December 1956 (aged 30)		(Ecuador) Barcelona
19	MF	José Jacinto Vega	28 October 1958 (aged 28)		(Ecuador) Barcelona
20	GK	Carlos Enríquez	22 May 1966 (aged 21)		(Ecuador) Deportivo Quito

=== Peru ===
Head Coach: Fernando Cuellar

No.	Pos.	Player	Date of birth (age)	Caps	Club
1	GK	César Chávez-Riva	22 November 1964 (aged 22)		(Peru) Universitario
2	DF	Percy Olivares	6 May 1968 (aged 19)		(Peru) Sporting Cristal
3	DF	Martín Duffó	2 January 1963 (aged 24)		(Peru) Juventud La Palma
4	DF	Leonardo Rojas	9 October 1962 (aged 24)		(Peru) Universitario
5	DF	Pedro Requena	15 October 1961 (aged 25)		(Peru) Universitario
6	MF	Javier Chirinos	8 May 1960 (aged 27)		(Peru) Universitario
7	MF	César Loyola	13 September 1965 (aged 21)		(Peru) Sporting Cristal
8	MF	Eduardo Malásquez	13 October 1957 (aged 29)		(Peru) Universitario
9	FW	Franco Navarro	10 November 1961 (aged 25)		(Argentina) Independiente
10	MF	Julio César Uribe	9 May 1958 (aged 29)		(Colombia) América de Cali
11	FW	Jorge Hirano	14 August 1956 (aged 30)		(Bolivia) Bolívar
12	GK	José González Ganoza	10 July 1954 (aged 32)		(Peru) Alianza Lima
13	DF	Jorge Arteaga	29 December 1966 (aged 20)		(Peru) Sporting Cristal
14	DF	Juan Reynoso	28 December 1969 (aged 17)		(Peru) Alianza Lima
15	MF	Jorge Cordero	2 January 1962 (aged 25)		(Peru) Unión Huaral
16	DF	Jorge Olaechea	27 August 1956 (aged 30)		(Colombia) Deportivo Cali
17	MF	Luis Reyna	6 May 1959 (aged 28)		(Peru) Universitario
18	DF	Cedric Vásquez	30 June 1959 (aged 27)		(Peru) San Agustín
19	FW	Eugenio La Rosa	20 December 1962 (aged 24)		(Peru) Alianza Lima
20	MF	Roberto Martínez	3 December 1967 (aged 19)		(Peru) San Agustín
21	MF	José del Solar	28 November 1967 (aged 19)		(Peru) San Agustín
22	FW	Anselmo Soto	21 April 1965 (aged 22)		(Peru) UTC

== Group B ==
=== Brazil ===
Head Coach: Carlos Alberto Silva

No.	Pos.	Player	Date of birth (age)	Caps	Club
1	GK	Carlos	4 March 1956 (aged 31)		(Brazil) Corinthians
2	DF	Josimar	19 September 1961 (aged 25)		(Brazil) Botafogo (RJ)
3	DF	Geraldão	24 April 1963 (aged 24)		(Brazil) Cruzeiro
4	DF	Ricardo Rocha	11 September 1962 (aged 24)		(Brazil) Guarani
5	DF	Douglas	1 March 1963 (aged 24)		(Brazil) Cruzeiro
6	DF	Nelsinho	31 December 1962 (aged 24)		(Brazil) São Paulo
7	FW	Müller	31 January 1966 (aged 21)		(Brazil) São Paulo
8	MF	Raí	15 May 1965 (aged 22)		(Brazil) Botafogo (SP)
9	FW	Careca	4 October 1960 (aged 26)		(Italy) Napoli
10	MF	Edú Marangón	2 February 1963 (aged 24)		(Brazil) Portuguesa
11	MF	Valdo	12 January 1964 (aged 23)		(Brazil) Grêmio
12	GK	Zé Carlos	7 February 1962 (aged 25)		(Brazil) Flamengo
13	DF	Jorginho	17 August 1964 (aged 22)		(Brazil) Flamengo
14	DF	Ricardo Gomes	13 December 1964 (aged 22)		(Brazil) Fluminense
15	DF	Júlio César	8 March 1963 (aged 24)		(France) Montpellier
16	MF	Dunga	31 October 1963 (aged 23)		(Brazil) Vasco da Gama
17	FW	Edu Manga	2 February 1967 (aged 20)		(Brazil) Palmeiras
18	MF	Silas	27 August 1965 (aged 21)		(Brazil) São Paulo
19	FW	Romário	29 January 1966 (aged 21)		(Brazil) Vasco da Gama
20	FW	Mirandinha	2 July 1959 (aged 27)		(England) Newcastle United
21	FW	João Paulo	7 September 1964 (aged 22)		(Brazil) Guarani
22	GK	Régis	23 April 1965 (aged 22)		(Brazil) America

=== Chile ===
Head Coach: Orlando Aravena

No.	Pos.	Player	Date of birth (age)	Caps	Club
1	GK	Roberto Rojas	8 August 1957 (aged 29)		(Chile) Colo-Colo
2	DF	Patricio Reyes	27 November 1957 (aged 29)		Universidad de Chile
3	DF	Ricardo Toro	16 December 1961 (aged 25)		(Chile) Palestino
4	DF	Luis Hormazábal	13 February 1959 (aged 28)		(Chile) Colo-Colo
5	MF	Luis Rodríguez	16 March 1961 (aged 26)		Universidad de Chile
6	MF	Jaime Pizarro	2 March 1964 (aged 23)		(Chile) Colo-Colo
7	FW	Ivo Basay	13 April 1966 (aged 21)		(Chile) Everton
8	MF	Eduardo Gómez	2 June 1958 (aged 29)		(Chile) Cobreloa
9	FW	Juan Carlos Letelier	20 February 1959 (aged 28)		(Chile) Cobreloa
10	FW	Jorge Contreras	3 July 1960 (aged 26)		(Spain) Las Palmas
11	DF	Fernando Astengo	8 January 1960 (aged 27)		(Brazil) Grêmio
12	GK	Marco Cornez	15 October 1957 (aged 29)		(Chile) Universidad Católica
13	MF	Jaime Vera	25 March 1963 (aged 24)		(Chile) Colo-Colo
14	MF	Ruben Espinoza	1 June 1961 (aged 26)		(Chile) Universidad Católica
15	FW	Osvaldo Hurtado	2 November 1957 (aged 29)		(Chile) Universidad Católica
16	FW	Iván Zamorano	18 January 1967 (aged 20)		(Chile) Cobresal
17	MF	Sergio Salgado	12 August 1958 (aged 28)		(Chile) Cobresal
18	MF	Patricio Mardones	17 July 1962 (aged 24)		(Chile) Universidad Católica
19	DF	Alex Martínez	26 October 1959 (aged 27)		(Chile) Universidad Católica
20	MF	Héctor Puebla	10 July 1955 (aged 31)		(Chile) Cobreloa
21	FW	Hugo Rubio	5 July 1960 (aged 26)		(Chile) Colo-Colo
22	GK	Mario Osbén	14 July 1950 (aged 36)		(Chile) Cobreloa

=== Venezuela ===
Head Coach: (Spain) Rafael Santana

No.	Pos.	Player	Date of birth (age)	Caps	Club
1	GK	César Baena	16 January 1961 (aged 26)		(Venezuela) Caracas FC
2	DF	René Torres	13 October 1960 (aged 26)		(Venezuela) Estudiantes de Mérida
3	DF	Julio Quintero	31 October 1964 (aged 22)		(Venezuela) Portuguesa
4	DF	Pedro Acosta	28 November 1959 (aged 27)		(Venezuela) Marítimo
5	DF	Héctor Rivas	27 September 1968 (aged 18)		(Venezuela) Marítimo
6	MF	José Nieto	6 November 1958 (aged 28)		(Venezuela) Unión Atlético Táchira
7	DF	Francisco Rizzi	13 July 1964 (aged 22)		(Venezuela) Marítimo
8	FW	Nelson Carrero	8 February 1953 (aged 34)		(Venezuela) Marítimo
9	FW	Herbert Márquez	10 November 1961 (aged 25)		(Venezuela) Marítimo
10	MF	Carlos Maldonado	30 July 1963 (aged 23)		(Venezuela) Unión Atlético Táchira
11	FW	Wilton Arreaza	12 August 1966 (aged 20)		(Venezuela) Caracas FC
12	GK	Daniel Nikolac	11 May 1961 (aged 26)		(Venezuela) Marítimo
13	MF	Ildemaro Fernández	27 December 1961 (aged 25)		(Venezuela) Estudiantes de Mérida
14	FW	Iván Isea	12 February 1964 (aged 23)		(Venezuela) Marítimo
15	DF	Zdenko Morovic	31 August 1966 (aged 20)		(Venezuela) Deportivo Italia
16	DF	Pablo Mendoza			(Venezuela) Deportivo Italia
17	MF	Roberto Elie	11 May 1959 (aged 28)		(Venezuela) Caracas FC
18	MF	Asdrúbal Sánchez	1 April 1958 (aged 29)		(Venezuela) Estudiantes de Mérida
19	FW	Ángel Castillo	18 April 1957 (aged 30)		(Venezuela) Deportivo Italia
20	MF	Williám Méndez	10 December 1958 (aged 28)		(Venezuela) Unión Atlético Táchira
21	DF	Gerardo Ferrebús	21 June 1956 (aged 31)		(Venezuela) Caracas FC
22	FW	Rodolfo Carvajal	8 February 1952 (aged 35)		(Venezuela) Estudiantes de Mérida

== Group C ==
=== Bolivia ===
Head Coach: (Argentina) Nito Veiga

No.	Pos.	Player	Date of birth (age)	Caps	Club
1	GK	Luis Galarza	26 December 1950 (aged 36)		(Bolivia) The Strongest
2	DF	Rómer Roca	1 July 1966 (aged 20)		(Bolivia) Oriente Petrolero
3	DF	Miguel Ángel Noro	22 August 1961 (aged 25)		(Bolivia) Blooming
4	DF	Félix Vera	18 May 1961 (aged 26)		(Bolivia) Jorge Wilstermann
5	DF	Rolando Coimbra	25 February 1960 (aged 27)		(Bolivia) Blooming
6	DF	Eduardo Villegas	29 March 1964 (aged 23)		(Bolivia) The Strongest
*7	MF	Marciano Saldías	26 April 1966 (aged 21)		(Bolivia) Oriente Petrolero
8	MF	José Milton Melgar	20 September 1959 (aged 27)		(Argentina) Boca Juniors
9	MF	Federico Justiniano	18 July 1964 (aged 22)		(Bolivia) Destroyers
10	MF	Carlos Borja	25 December 1956 (aged 30)		(Bolivia) Bolívar
11	FW	Wilson Ávila	19 April 1958 (aged 29)		(Bolivia) Oriente Petrolero
12	GK	Marco Antonio Barrero	26 January 1962 (aged 25)		(Bolivia) Jorge Wilstermann
*13	MF	Mauricio Ramos	9 March 1969 (aged 18)		(Bolivia) Destroyers
14	FW	Roly Paniagua	14 November 1966 (aged 20)		(Bolivia) Blooming
15	FW	Álvaro Peña	11 September 1966 (aged 20)		(Bolivia) Blooming
16	FW	Oscar Ramírez	29 July 1961 (aged 25)		(Bolivia) Oriente Petrolero
17	FW	Víctor Hugo Antelo	2 November 1964 (aged 22)		(Bolivia) Oriente Petrolero
18	DF	Carlos Arias Torrico	25 August 1956 (aged 30)		(Bolivia) Bolívar
19	FW	Gastón Taborga	11 November 1960 (aged 26)		(Bolivia) Blooming
20	FW	Silvio Rojas	3 November 1959 (aged 27)		(Bolivia) Blooming

- Marciano Saldías and Mauricio Ramos remained on standby in Bolivia and did not travel to Argentina.

=== Colombia ===
Head Coach: Francisco Maturana

No.	Pos.	Player	Date of birth (age)	Caps	Club
1	GK	René Higuita	26 August 1966 (aged 20)		(Colombia) Atlético Nacional
2	DF	Luis Carlos Perea	29 December 1963 (aged 23)		(Colombia) Atlético Nacional
3	DF	Nolberto Molina	5 January 1953 (aged 34)		(Colombia) Atlético Nacional
4	DF	Luis Fernando Herrera	12 February 1962 (aged 25)		(Colombia) Atlético Nacional
5	DF	Carlos Hoyos	28 February 1962 (aged 25)		(Colombia) Deportivo Cali
6	MF	Ricardo Pérez	24 October 1963 (aged 23)		(Colombia) Atlético Nacional
7	FW	Antony de Ávila	21 December 1962 (aged 24)		(Colombia) América de Cali
8	MF	Leonel Álvarez	29 July 1965 (aged 21)		(Colombia) Atlético Nacional
9	FW	Juan Jairo Galeano	12 August 1962 (aged 24)		(Colombia) Atlético Nacional
10	MF	Carlos Valderrama	2 September 1961 (aged 25)		(Colombia) Deportivo Cali
11	MF	Bernardo Redín	23 February 1963 (aged 24)		(Colombia) Deportivo Cali
12	GK	Mario Jiménez	26 May 1959 (aged 28)		(Colombia) Deportes Quindío
13	FW	John Jairo Trellez	29 April 1968 (aged 19)		(Colombia) Atlético Nacional
14	DF	Alexis Mendoza	9 November 1961 (aged 25)		(Colombia) Atlético Junior
15	FW	Sergio Angulo	14 September 1960 (aged 26)		(Colombia) Deportivo Cali
16	DF	Jorge Porras	25 December 1959 (aged 27)		(Colombia) América de Cali
17	MF	Mario Coll	20 August 1960 (aged 26)		(Colombia) Atlético Junior
18	MF	Gabriel Gómez	15 December 1959 (aged 27)		(Colombia) Millonarios
19	FW	Arnoldo Iguarán	16 January 1957 (aged 30)		(Colombia) Millonarios
20	MF	Álex Escobar	8 February 1965 (aged 22)		(Colombia) América de Cali

=== Paraguay ===
Head Coach: Silvio Parodi

No.	Pos.	Player	Date of birth (age)	Caps	Club
1	GK	Roberto Fernández	9 July 1954 (aged 32)		(Colombia) Deportivo Cali
2	DF	Juan Bautista Torales	9 May 1959 (aged 28)		(Paraguay) Libertad
3	DF	Rogelio Delgado	12 October 1959 (aged 27)		(Paraguay) Olimpia
4	DF	Justo Jacquet	9 September 1961 (aged 25)		(Paraguay) Cerro Porteño
5	DF	César Zabala	3 June 1961 (aged 26)		(Paraguay) Cerro Porteño
6	MF	Jorge Guasch	17 January 1961 (aged 26)		(Paraguay) Olimpia
7	MF	Romerito	28 August 1960 (aged 26)		(Brazil) Fluminense
8	DF	Gustavo Benítez	5 February 1953 (aged 34)		(Paraguay) Olimpia
9	FW	Roberto Cabañas	11 April 1961 (aged 26)		(Colombia) América de Cali
10	MF	Adolfino Cañete	13 September 1965 (aged 21)		(Colombia) Unión Magdalena
11	FW	Ramón Hicks	30 May 1959 (aged 28)		(Spain) Sabadell
12	GK	Raúl Navarro	14 March 1962 (aged 25)		(Paraguay) Cerro Porteño
13	DF	Virginio Cáceres	21 July 1962 (aged 24)		(Paraguay) Guaraní
14	DF	Librado Rodríguez	20 July 1957 (aged 29)		(Paraguay) Atlético Colegiales
15	DF	Marcelino Blanco	3 January 1966 (aged 21)		(Paraguay) Sol de América
16	FW	Eumelio Palacios	15 September 1964 (aged 22)		(Paraguay) Libertad
17	FW	Buenaventura Ferreira	4 July 1960 (aged 26)		(Paraguay) Guaraní
18	FW	Félix Torres	28 April 1962 (aged 25)		(Paraguay) Sol de América
19	FW	Gabriel González	18 March 1961 (aged 26)		(Paraguay) Cerro Porteño
20	MF	Jorge Amado Nunes	18 October 1961 (aged 25)		(Paraguay) Olimpia
21	MF	Rafael Bobadilla	4 October 1963 (aged 23)		(Colombia) Millonarios
22	GK	Carlos Colarte	1 September 1961 (aged 25)		(Paraguay) Sol de América

== Semi-final ==
=== Uruguay ===
Head Coach: Roberto Fleitas

No.	Pos.	Player	Date of birth (age)	Caps	Club
1	GK	Jorge Seré	9 July 1961 (aged 25)		(Uruguay) Danubio
2	DF	Gonzalo Díaz	14 April 1966 (aged 21)		(Uruguay) Wanderers
3	DF	Nelson Gutiérrez	13 April 1962 (aged 25)		(Argentina) River Plate
4	DF	Obdulio Trasante	20 April 1960 (aged 27)		(Uruguay) Peñarol
5	DF	José Pintos Saldanha	25 March 1964 (aged 23)		(Uruguay) Nacional
6	MF	José Enrique Peña	25 May 1963 (aged 24)		(Uruguay) Wanderers
7	FW	Antonio Alzamendi	7 June 1956 (aged 31)		(Argentina) River Plate
8	MF	Gustavo Matosas	25 May 1967 (aged 20)		(Uruguay) Peñarol
9	FW	Enrique Báez	16 January 1966 (aged 21)		(Uruguay) Wanderers
10	FW	Enzo Francéscoli	12 November 1961 (aged 25)		(France) Racing Club Paris
11	FW	Ruben Sosa	25 April 1966 (aged 21)		(Spain) Real Zaragoza
12	GK	Eduardo Pereira	21 March 1954 (aged 33)		(Uruguay) Peñarol
13	DF	Óscar Aguirregaray	25 October 1959 (aged 27)		(Uruguay) Defensor Sporting
14	DF	Alfonso Domínguez	24 September 1965 (aged 21)		(Uruguay) Peñarol
15	MF	José Perdomo	5 January 1965 (aged 22)		(Uruguay) Peñarol
16	MF	Pablo Bengoechea	27 June 1965 (aged 22)		(Uruguay) Wanderers
17	MF	Erardo Cóccaro	20 January 1961 (aged 26)		(Uruguay) Progreso
18	FW	Mauricio Silvera	30 December 1964 (aged 22)		(Uruguay) Nacional
19	FW	Walter Pelletti	31 May 1966 (aged 21)		(Uruguay) Wanderers
20	MF	Gustavo Dalto	16 March 1963 (aged 24)		(Uruguay) Danubio
21	MF	Eduardo da Silva	19 August 1966 (aged 20)		(Uruguay) Peñarol
22	GK	Héctor Tuja	6 March 1960 (aged 27)		(Uruguay) Defensor Sporting
