= Vehicle registration plates of Belize =

Belize
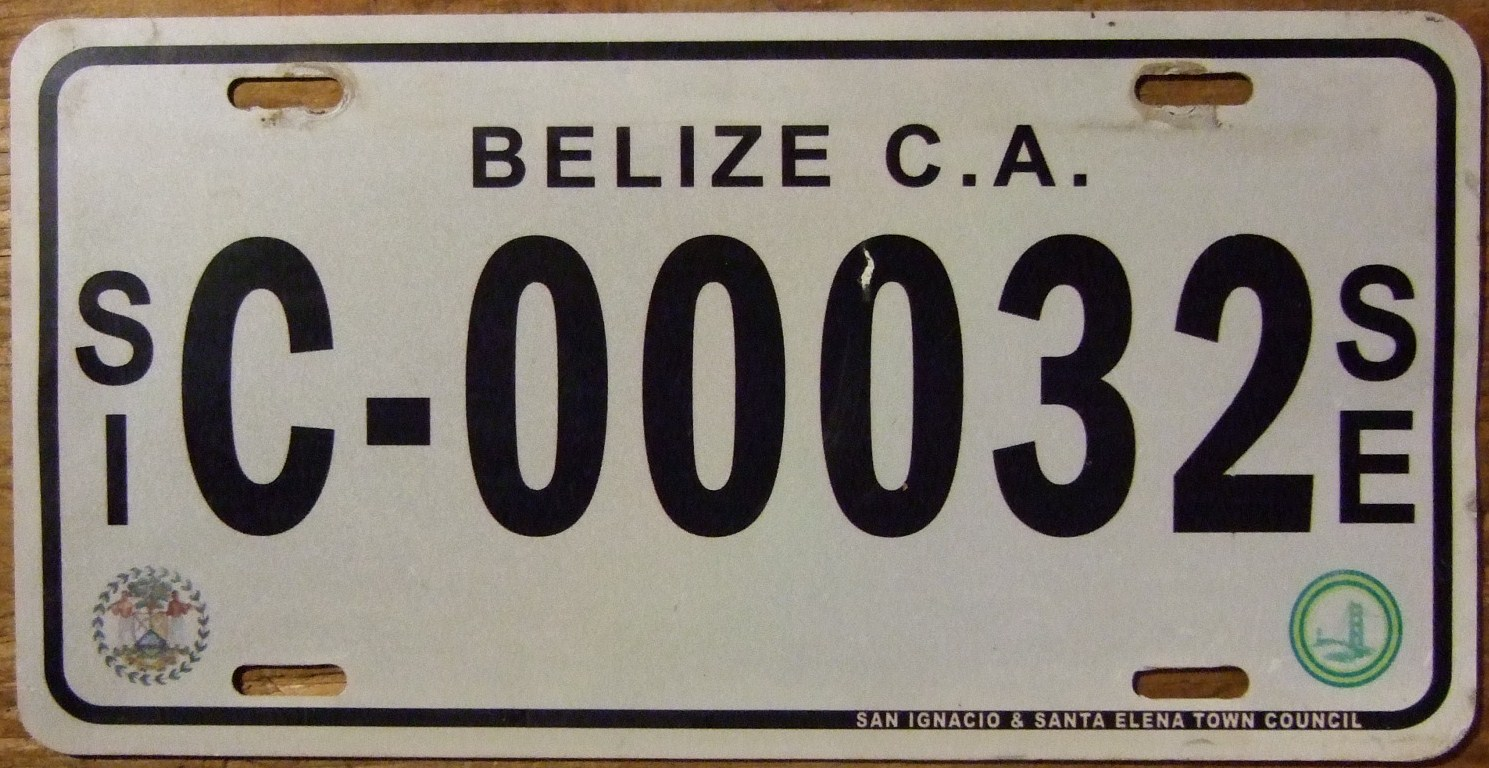
- Regular legal standard number plate from Belize.
- Country: Belize
- Country code: BH

Current series
- Size: 152 mm × 300 mm 6.0 in × 11.8 in
- Colour (front): Black on white
- Colour (rear): Black on white

Belize requires its residents to register their motor vehicles and display vehicle registration plates. Current plates are North American standard 6 in × 12 in (152 mm × 300 mm).

Originally, Belize was a crown colony of Great Britain named British Honduras when license plates were first issued. In 1964 British Honduras was granted self government, and then in 1973 the country was renamed Belize. The 1973 license plates were the first to have the name Belize on them. Full independence from Great Britain took plate on 21 September 1981. The initials "C.A." on the plates stand for "Central America." As of 2024, Belize's road code remains BH, despite the country's independence from the United Kingdom.

== Location codes ==
The following table shows the abbreviations used on license plates for each of the six administrative districts in Belize.

District codes
District	Capital	Abbreviation
Belize	Belize City	BZ
Cayo	San Ignacio	CY
Corozal	Corozal Town	CZL
Orange Walk	Orange Walk Town	OW
Stann Creek	Dangriga	SC
Toledo	Punta Gorda	TOL

There are also several cities that have their own codes. These are shown in the table below. Because they are known as the "Twin Towns", the codes for San Ignatio and Santa Elena both appear on the same license plate.

City codes
District	City	Abbreviation
Belize	Belize City	BC
Belize	San Pedro	SP
Cayo	Belmopan	BMP
Cayo	Benque Viejo	BVO
Cayo	San Ignacio	SI
Cayo	Santa Elena	SE
Corozal	Corozal	CZL
Stann Creek	Dangriga	DGA
Toledo	Punta Gorda	PG

== Passenger plates ==
Image	Issued	Design	Serial format	Serials issued	Notes
	1973-1981	Black serial number on a white background	A-1234		
	1981-	Black serial number on a white background	A-1234		
	2000s	Black serial number on a white background	A-12345		
		Black serial number on a white background	A-12345		
	2009	Black serial number on a white background; "Belize C.A." at top; seal and district names on some plates at various locations	C-1234; C-12345		

== Special plates ==
Image	First issued	Design	Serial format	Serials issued	Notes
		Black serial number on an orange background	12345		Automobile dealers
		White serial number on a black background	A-12345		Agricultural and commercial trucks
		White serial number on a brown background	ABC-123		Defense Ministry
		Black serial number on a white background	M-1234		Motorcycles
	2010s	Black serial number on a white background; same format at top and bottom as passenger car plates	M-12345		Motorcycles
		White serial number on a dark green background	A-12345		Taxis and public service vehicles
