= Pablo Marín =

Pablo Marín may refer to:

- Pablo Antón Marín Estrada, Spanish writer
- Pablo Marín (footballer, born 1965), Ecuadorian footballer
- Pablo Marín (footballer, born 2003), Spanish footballer
- Pablo Marin, Belizean politician

== See also ==
- Pablo Marí, Spanish footballer
