= Jacome =

Jacome or Jácome is a Portuguese and Spanish surname and a given name. Notable people with the name include:

- Jácome de Bruges, 1st Captain-Donee of Terceira (1418–unknown), Flemish nobleman and businessman
- Jácome Cromberger (c. 1525 – c. 1560), spanish printer
- Jacome Gonsalves (1676–1742), Sri Lankan priest and missionary
- Jácome de Olivares (fl. 1540 – fl. 1571), Portuguese merchant and spy
- Jácome de Ornelas Bruges, 1st Count of Praia da Vitória (1833–1889), Portuguese nobleman and politician
- Jácome Ratton (1736–1820), Franco-Portuguese nobleman and businessman
- Aires Jácome Correia, 1st Marquis of Jácome Correia (born 1882), Portuguese nobleman and landowner
- Antía Jácome (born 1999), Spanish sprint canoeist
- Antônio Jácome (born 1962), Brazilian politician
- Arella Jácome (born 2004), Ecuadorian politician
- Dionisio Pérez-Jácome Friscione (born 1967), Mexican economist
- Dolores Isabel Jacome Silva (born 1991), Portuguese footballer
- Elías Jácome (1945–1999), Ecuadorian football referee
- Fernando Jácome (born 1980), Colombian swimmer
- Jason Jacome (born 1970), American baseball pitcher
- José Jácome Correia (born 1816), Portuguese landowner and politician
- Juan Jácome (born 1960), Ecuadorian footballer
- Leon Jacome, an alias of Ramón Mercader (1913–1978), Spanish communist and Soviet spy
- Mariela Jácome (born 1996), American-born Ecuadorian footballer
- Pedro Jácome Correia, 1st Count of Jácome Correia (born 1817), Portuguese nobleman and landowner
- Rafael Jácome de Andrade (1851–1900), Portuguese military figure and politician
- Santiago Jácome (born 1973), Ecuadorian footballer
- Tomasa Yarhui Jacomé (born 1968), Bolivian lawyer and politician
