= Óscar Ramírez =

Óscar Ramírez may refer to:

- Oscar Ramírez (footballer, born 1961), Bolivian footballer
- Óscar Ramírez (footballer, born 1964), Costa Rican footballer and manager
- Óscar Ramírez (footballer, born 1984), Spanish footballer
- Óscar Ramírez Durand (born 1953), Peruvian Maoist terrorist and Shining Path leader
- Óscar Ramírez Mijares, Mexican politician, twice elected for the 21st federal electoral district of Mexico City
- Óscar Ramírez, survivor of the Dos Erres massacre in Guatemala, subject of the film Finding Oscar
