= Luis Mosquera =

Luis Mosquera may refer to:

- Luis Mosquera (footballer, born 1959), Chilean footballer
- Luis Mosquera (footballer, born 1964), Ecuadorian footballer
- Luis Fernando Mosquera (born 1986), Colombian footballer
- Luis Javier Mosquera (born 1995), Colombian weightlifter
