= Carlos Enríquez =

Carlos Enríquez can refer to:

- Carlos Enríquez (actor) (1898–1971), Uruguayan actor
- Carlos Enríquez (footballer) (born 1966), Ecuadorian footballer
- Carlos Enríquez Gómez (1900–1957), Cuban painter and writer

== See also ==
- Carlos Enríquez, one of numerous pen names of Spanish writer J. Mallorquí (1913–1972)
- Carlos Henríquez (disambiguation)
