= Thea Garcia-Ramirez =

Belizean women's rights activist and politician

Minister of Human Development, Family Support & Gender Affairs in the Cabinet of Belize
- Incumbent
- Assumed office March 2025
- Governor-General: Froyla Tzalam
- Prime Minister: John Briceño

Personal details
- Party: People’s United Party (PUP)
- Education: Mary Hill Roman Catholic School, Corozal

Thea Garcia-Ramirez is a Belizean women's rights activist and politician of the ruling People’s United Party (PUP). In 2025, she was appointed Minister of Human Development, Family Support & Gender Affairs in the Cabinet of Belize.

== Career ==
Prior to entering parliamentary politics, Garcia-Ramirez was General Manager of the Belize Airports Authority. She then worked as President of the National Women’s Commission of Belize, where she called for national legislation to deal with femicide, campaigned against domestic violence and violence against women and praised Belize's waiving of tax on menstrual products. In May 2022 she represented Belize as delegate to the Organization of American States (OAS) 39th Assembly of the Inter-American Commission of Women (CIM) at the Latin American and Caribbean Parliament (PARLATINO) headquarters.

In July 2024, at the PUP Corozal Bay standard bearer convention, Garcia-Ramirez ran against and defeated the incumbent area representative Elvia Vega-Samos for the nomination. At the 2025 Belizean general election in March 2025, Garcia-Ramirez ran against Hernan Riverol of the United Democratic Party (Belize) and Vega-Samos, who ran as an independent candidate, and won the Corozal Bay seat.

After the general election, Garcia-Ramirez was appointed Minister of Human Development, Family Support & Gender Affairs in the Cabinet of Belize by Prime Minister John Briceño. In post, Garcia-Ramirez introduced the Families Bill to the National Assembly in May 2025 and has signed a memorandum of understanding (MoU) to launch the "People Living with HIV" (PLHIV) program to support nutrition for people living with a HIV diagnosis. Garcia-Ramirez has also met with the Ambassador of Japan to Belize, Nobuyuki Shirakata, and has represented Belize during an Inter-American Development Bank (IDB) Regional Dialogue on Violence Against Women meeting in Mexico City.

Garcia-Ramirez's aunt is PUP politician Dolores Balderamos-Garcia.
