= Carlos Henríquez =

Carlos Henríquez may refer to:

- Carlos Henriquez (fl. 2010s), U.S. politician from Massachusetts
- Carlos Henríquez Argomedo (fl. 1930s), Chilean politician, cabinet minister
- Carlos Henríquez Consalvi (born 1947), Venezuelan author and journalist
- Carlos Henriquez (musician) (born 1979), American double bassist and composer

== See also ==
- Carlos Enríquez (disambiguation)
