= Williám Méndez =

Venezuelan footballer (born 1958)

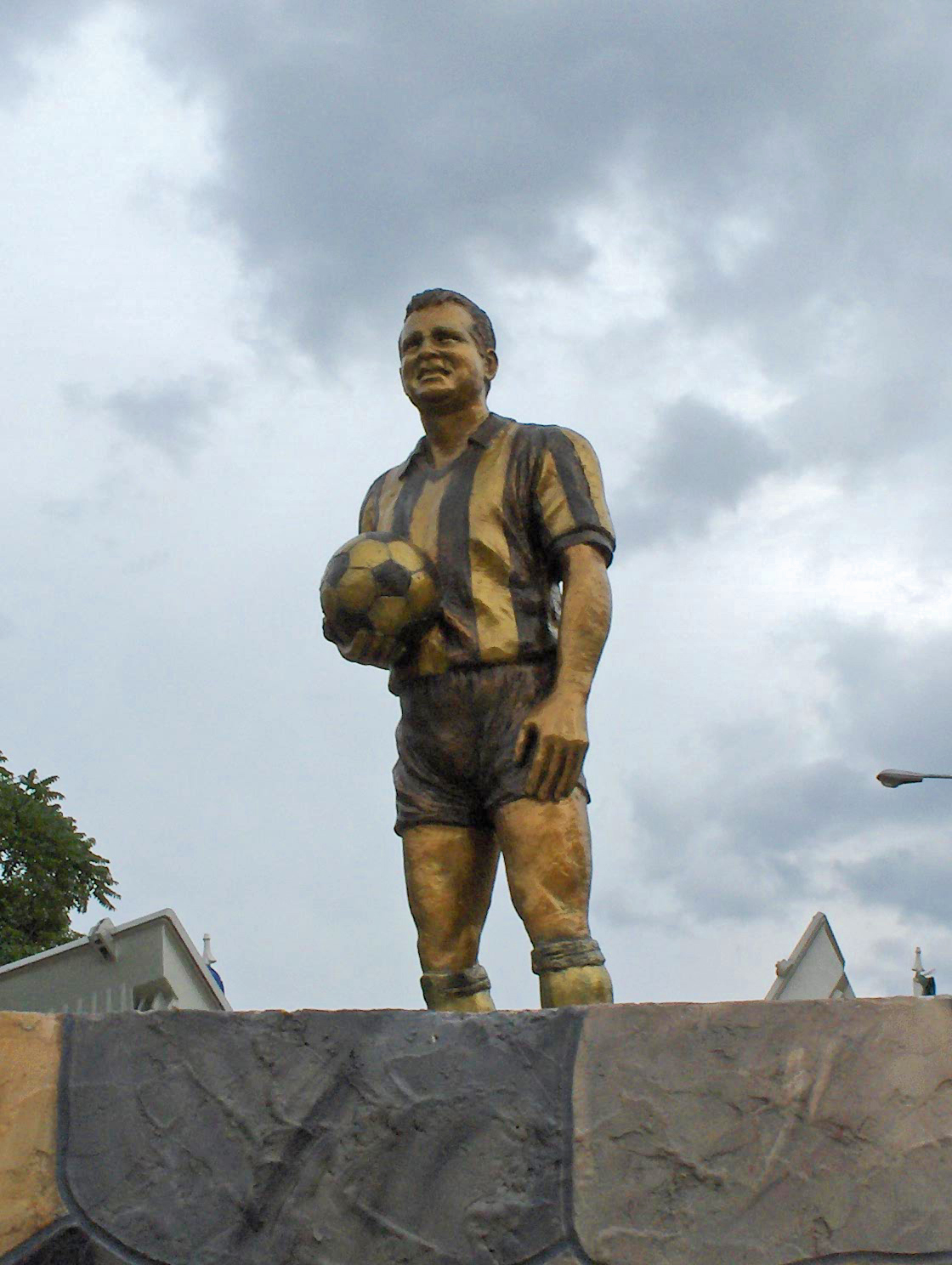

Personal information
- Date of birth: 10 December 1958 (age 67)
- Place of birth: San Cristóbal, Venezuela

International career
Years	Team	Apps	(Gls)
1985–1987	Venezuela	9	(0)

Williám Méndez (born 10 December 1958) is a Venezuelan footballer. He played in nine matches for the Venezuela national football team from 1985 to 1987. He was also part of Venezuela's squad for the 1987 Copa América tournament.
