= Wilson Macías =

Ecuadorian footballer (born 1965)

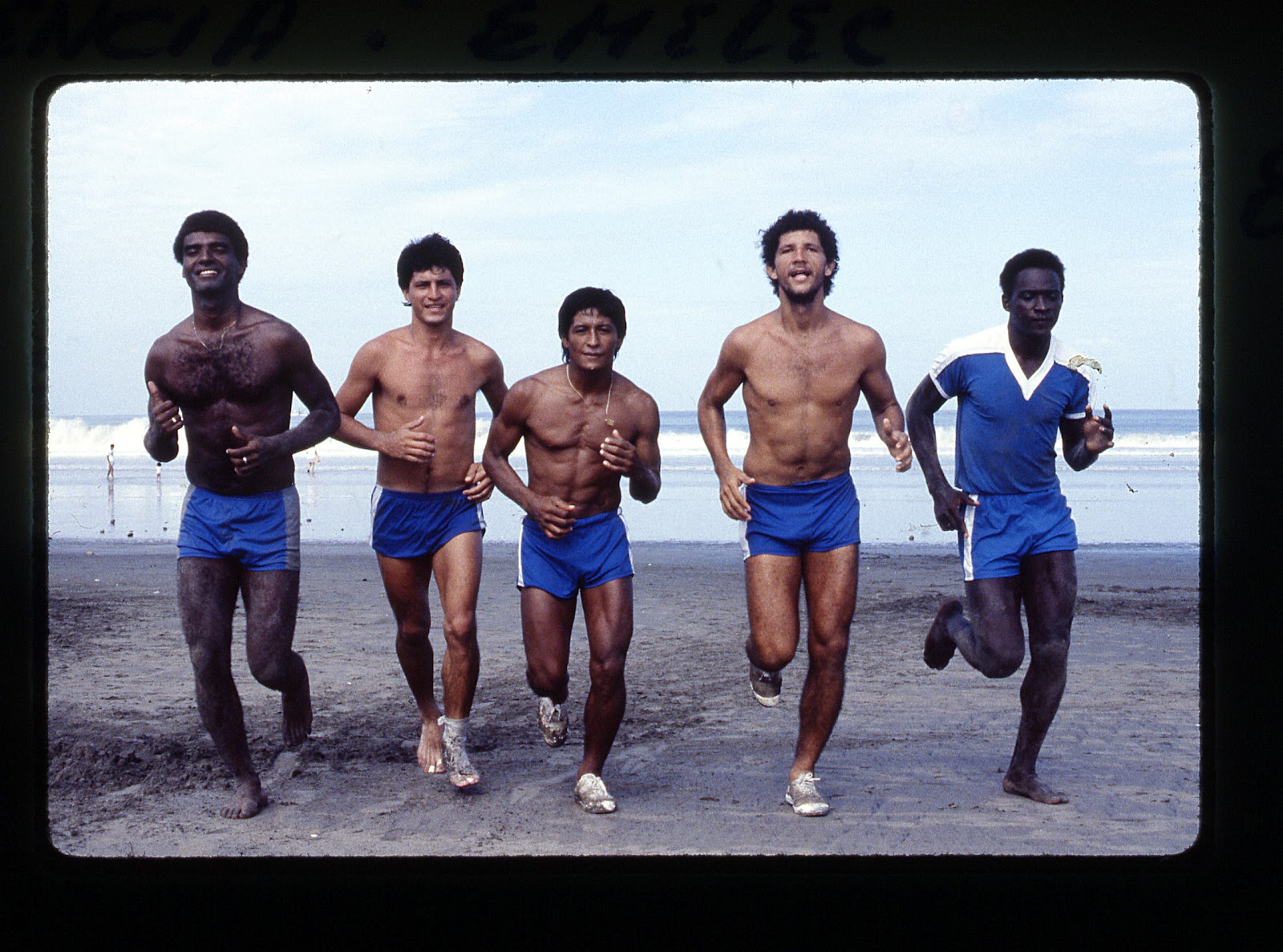
- Macías is second from the right

Personal information
- Date of birth: 30 September 1965 (age 61)

International career
Years	Team	Apps	(Gls)
1987–1991	Ecuador	34	(0)

Wilson Macías (born 30 September 1965) is an Ecuadorian footballer. He played in 34 matches for the Ecuador national football team from 1987 to 1991. He was also part of Ecuador's squad for the 1987 Copa América tournament.
