= Mario Coll =

Colombian footballer (born 1960)

Personal information
- Full name: Mario Alberto Coll Montealegre
- Date of birth: 20 August 1960 (age 66)
- Place of birth: Bucaramanga, Colombia

International career
Years	Team	Apps	(Gls)
1987–1990	Colombia	5	(0)

Mario Alberto Coll Montealegre (born 20 August 1960) is a Colombian footballer. He played in five matches for the Colombia national football team from 1987 to 1990. He was also part of Colombia's squad for the 1987 Copa América tournament.
