= Elvia Vega-Samos =

Belizean politician

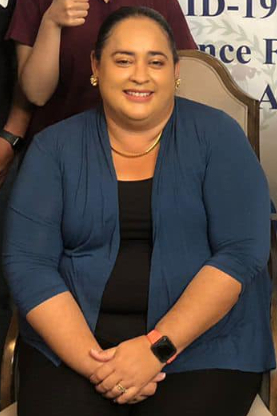
Vega-Samos in 2022

Elvia Vega-Samos is a Belizean politician. She was MP for Corozal Bay and Minister of State in the Ministry of Human Development, Families & Indigenous People's Affairs until 2025. In 2024, she lost to Thea Garcia-Ramirez in the PUP nomination convention.

== See also ==
- Cabinet of Belize
