= Mauricio Silvera =

Uruguayan footballer (born 1964)

Personal information
- Full name: Mauricio Joselito Silvera De los Santos
- Date of birth: 30 December 1964 (age 61)
- Place of birth: Montevideo, Uruguay
- Height: 1.70 m (5 ft 7 in)
- Position: Forward

Senior career*
Years	Team	Apps	(Gls)
1982–1985	River Plate (Montevideo)		
1986–1987	Club Nacional de Football		
1988	Deportivo Pereira		
1989–1990	Peñarol		
1991	Fénix Montevideo		
1992–1993	Atlético Bucaramanga		
1994	Fénix Montevideo		
1995	Progreso		

International career
1983–1987	Uruguay	7	(0)
- * Club domestic league appearances and goals

Mauricio Joselito Silvera De los Santos (born 30 December 1964) is a Uruguayan former footballer who played as a forward. He made seven appearances for the Uruguay national team from 1983 to 1987. He was also part of Uruguay's squad for the 1987 Copa América tournament.
