= Félix Vera =

Bolivian footballer (born 1961)

Personal information
- Full name: Félix Vera Calatayud
- Date of birth: 17 May 1961 (age 65)
- Position: Defender

International career
Years	Team	Apps	(Gls)
1987	Bolivia	3	(0)

Félix Vera (born 17 May 1961) is a Bolivian footballer. He played in three matches for the Bolivia national football team from in 1987. He was also part of Bolivia's squad for the 1987 Copa América tournament.
