= Wilton Arreaza =

Venezuelan footballer (born 1966)

Personal information
- Date of birth: 12 August 1966 (age 60)

International career
Years	Team	Apps	(Gls)
1987–1989	Venezuela	5	(0)

Wilton Arreaza (born 12 August 1966) is a Venezuelan footballer. He played in five matches for the Venezuela national football team from 1987 to 1989. He was also part of Venezuela's squad for the 1987 Copa América tournament.
