= Jorge Porras =

Colombian footballer (born 1959)

Jorge Armando Porras Villa (born 25 December 1959 in Medellín) is a former Colombian football player.

== Club career ==
Porras played for Atlético Nacional, América de Cali, Independiente Medellín and Once Caldas, appearing in more than 300 Colombian league matches during his professional career.

== International career ==
Porras made 20 appearances for the senior Colombia national football team from 1980 to 1987, including participating in eight qualifying matches for the 1982 and 1986 FIFA World Cups and the 1987 Copa América.

He also played for Colombia at the 1980 Olympic Games in Moscow.
