= Gastón Taborga =

Bolivian footballer (born 1960)

Personal information
- Date of birth: 11 November 1960 (age 65)
- Place of birth: Cochabamba, Bolivia

International career
Years	Team	Apps	(Gls)
1980–1987	Bolivia	16	(1)

Gastón Taborga (born 11 November 1960) is a Bolivian footballer. He played in 16 matches for the Bolivia national football team from 1980 to 1987. He was also part of Bolivia's squad for the 1987 Copa América tournament.
