= Héctor Rivas (footballer) =

Venezuelan footballer (born 1968)

Personal information
- Full name: Héctor Enrique Rivas Brito
- Date of birth: 27 September 1968 (age 58)

International career
Years	Team	Apps	(Gls)
1987–1995	Venezuela	24	(1)

Héctor Rivas (born 27 September 1968; full name: Héctor Enrique Rivas Brito) is a Venezuelan footballer. He played in 19 matches for the Venezuela national football team from 1987 to 1995. He was also part of Venezuela's squad for the 1987 Copa América tournament.
