= Anselmo Soto =

Peruvian footballer (born 1965)

Personal information
- Date of birth: 21 April 1965 (age 61)

International career
Years	Team	Apps	(Gls)
1987	Peru	2	(1)

Anselmo Soto (born 21 April 1965) is a Peruvian footballer. He played in two matches for the Peru national football team in 1987. He was also part of Peru's squad for the 1987 Copa América tournament.
