= Urlín Cangá =

Ecuadorian footballer (born 1959)

Personal information
- Date of birth: 29 August 1959 (age 67)
- Place of birth: Guayaquil, Ecuador

International career
Years	Team	Apps	(Gls)
1987	Ecuador	2	(0)

Urlín Bautista Cangá Quinteros (born 29 August 1959) is an Ecuadorian footballer. He played in two matches for the Ecuador national football team in 1987. He was also part of Ecuador's squad for the 1987 Copa América tournament.
