= Marciano Saldías =

Bolivian footballer (born 1966)

Personal information
- Full name: Marciano Saldías Barba
- Date of birth: April 25, 1966 (age 60)
- Place of birth: Santa Cruz de la Sierra, Bolivia
- Height: 1.67 m (5 ft 5 1/2 in)
- Position: Left-back

Senior career*
Years	Team	Apps	(Gls)
1984–1992	Oriente Petrolero		
1992	Cerro Porteño		
1993	Destroyers		
1994–1996	Oriente Petrolero		
1997	The Strongest		
1998–1999	Aurora		

International career
1984–1993	Bolivia		
- * Club domestic league appearances and goals

Marciano Saldías Barba (born April 25, 1966, in Santa Cruz de la Sierra) is a former Bolivian football defender who spent most of his career at Oriente Petrolero.

== Club career ==
Saldías joined Oriente Petrolero in 1984. He along other important players like Erwin "Chichi" Romero, Luis Cristaldo and Celio Alves formed an exceptional team that represented Bolivia at club level in several Copa Libertadores editions of the late 1980s and early 1990s. Playing for Oriente, he won the national title in 1990. Saldías also had a brief spell with Paraguayan club Cerro Porteño in 1992. The following year he joined Destroyers before returning to Oriente for a second stint in 1994. The Strongest signed him in 1997, but he left after only one season with the atigrados. He retired from football in 1999 while playing for Club Aurora in Copa Simón Bolívar.

== National team ==
He played for the Bolivia national team between 1984 and 1993, including participations in Copa América 1987, Copa América 1989 and Copa América 1991.

== Honours ==
=== Club ===
- Oriente Petrolero
  - Liga de Fútbol Profesional Boliviano: 1990
- Cerro Porteño
  - Primera División de Paraguay: 1992
