= Enrique Báez =

Uruguayan footballer (born 1966)

Personal information
- Full name: Enrique Raúl Báez
- Date of birth: 16 January 1966 (age 60)
- Place of birth: Santa Lucía, Uruguay
- Height: 1.83 m (6 ft 0 in)
- Position: Forward

Senior career*
Years	Team	Apps	(Gls)
1983	Santa Lucía		
1984–1988	Montevideo Wanderers		
1988–1990	FK Austria Wien	28	(5)
1990–1991	Nacional	27	(5)
1992	Talleres (RE)		
1995	Colón		

International career
1986–1988	Uruguay	7	(1)
Medal record
Representing Uruguay
Copa América
Winner	1987 Argentina
- * Club domestic league appearances and goals

Enrique Raúl Báez (born 16 January 1966) is a former Uruguayan footballer who played as a forward.

== International career ==
Báez made 14 appearances for the senior Uruguay national football team from 1986 to 1988. He also played in the 1987 Copa América.
