= Martín Duffó =

Peruvian footballer (born 1963)

Personal information
- Date of birth: 2 January 1963 (age 63)
- Place of birth: San Vicente de Cañete, Peru

International career
Years	Team	Apps	(Gls)
1987–1993	Peru	3	(0)

Martín Duffó (born 2 January 1963) is a Peruvian footballer. He played in three matches for the Peru national football team from 1987 to 1993. He was also part of Peru's squad for the 1987 Copa América tournament.
