= Luis Rodríguez (Chilean footballer) =

Chilean footballer and manager (born 1961)

Personal information
- Full name: Luis Abdón Rodríguez Muelas
- Date of birth: 16 March 1961 (age 65)
- Place of birth: Las Condes, Santiago, Chile
- Position: Midfielder

Youth career
- Universidad de Chile

Senior career*
Years	Team	Apps	(Gls)
1980–1986	Universidad de Chile		
1982	→ Coquimbo Unido (loan)		
1987	Puebla		
1988	Universidad de Chile		
1989–1991	Unión Española		
1992	Deportes La Serena		
1993	Provincial Osorno		
1994	Cobresal		
1995	Audax Italiano		
1996	Santiago Morning		

International career
1984–1989	Chile	8	(0)

Managerial career
- San Luis (youth)
- 2011: San Luis
- * Club domestic league appearances and goals

Luis Abdón Rodríguez Muelas (born 16 March 1961) is a Chilean former footballer and football manager.

== International career ==
Rodríguez played in eight matches for the Chile national team from 1984 to 1989. He was also part of Chile's squad for the 1987 Copa América tournament.

== Managerial career ==
In 2011, Rodríguez became the manager of San Luis de Quillota in the Primera B de Chile, after having managed the youth system. After adverse results, he was released, but continued as the person in charge of global development of the youth levels.

After his experience as manager, he went on to work as director and teacher at the INAF (National Football Institute).
