= Edgar Domínguez =

Ecuadorian footballer (born 1962)

Personal information
- Date of birth: 23 December 1962 (age 63)
- Place of birth: Cuenca, Ecuador

International career
Years	Team	Apps	(Gls)
1987–1988	Ecuador	16	(0)

Edgar Domínguez (born 23 December 1962) is an Ecuadorian footballer. He played in 16 matches for the Ecuador national football team from 1987 to 1988. He was also part of Ecuador's squad for the 1987 Copa América tournament.
