= Juan Vildo Marin =

Belizean politician

Juan Vildo Marin, otherwise known as Vildo Marin (born March 9, 1959, in Corozal Town, Corozal District, Belize) is a Belizean politician and People's United Party (PUP) member. He represented Corozal Bay, which includes Corozal Town, in the House of Representatives of Belize.

Marin was born in 1959. He has a B.A. from the Southeastern Louisiana University. He became a member of PUP in 1988. He was elected to the House in 1989 from Corozal Bay and has been reelected in every election since then. As of 2007, he holds the positions the minister for Agriculture and Fisheries and the deputy prime minister under Said Musa's government. Marin is married.
