= Héctor Chiriboga =

Ecuadorian footballer (born 1966)

Personal information
- Full name: Héctor Lautaro Chiriboga Sandoval
- Date of birth: 23 March 1966 (age 60)

International career
Years	Team	Apps	(Gls)
1987–1988	Ecuador	9	(0)

Héctor Lautaro Chiriboga Sandoval (born 23 March 1966) is an Ecuadorian footballer. He played in nine matches for the Ecuador national football team from 1987 to 1988. He was also part of Ecuador's squad for the 1987 Copa América tournament.
