= Federico Justiniano =

Bolivian footballer (born 1964)

Personal information
- Date of birth: 18 July 1964 (age 62)
- Place of birth: Montero, Bolivia

International career
Years	Team	Apps	(Gls)
1987	Bolivia	3	(0)

Federico Justiniano (born 18 July 1964) is a Bolivian footballer. He played in three matches for the Bolivia national football team in 1987. He was also part of Bolivia's squad for the 1987 Copa América tournament.
