= Wilson Ávila =

Bolivian footballer (born 1960)

Personal information
- Date of birth: 19 April 1960 (age 66)
- Place of birth: Vallegrande, Bolivia

International career
Years	Team	Apps	(Gls)
1985–1987	Bolivia	7	(0)

Wilson Ávila (born 19 April 1960) is a Bolivian footballer. He played in seven matches for the Bolivia national football team from 1985 to 1987. He was also part of Bolivia's squad for the 1987 Copa América tournament.
