= César Loyola =

Peruvian footballer (born 1965)

Personal information
- Full name: César Gerson Loyola Campos
- Date of birth: 13 September 1965 (age 61)
- Place of birth: Lima, Peru
- Position: Midfielder

Senior career*
| Years | Team | Apps | (Gls) |
- Sporting Cristal
- Sporting Cristal

International career
| 1984–1989 | Peru | 11 | (0) |
- * Club domestic league appearances and goals

César Gerson Loyola Campos (born 13 September 1965), is a Peruvian former footballer who played as a midfielder. He made eleven appearances for the Peru national team from 1983 to 1989. He was also part of Peru's squad for the 1987 Copa América tournament.
