= Cedric Vásquez =

Peruvian footballer (born 1959)

Personal information
- Date of birth: 30 June 1959 (age 67)
- Place of birth: Peru
- Position: Defender

Senior career*
Years	Team	Apps	(Gls)
1985	San Agustín		
1986	Deportivo Municipal		
1987	San Agustín		
1988	Alianza Lima		
1989–1992	San Agustín		
1993	Sport Boys		
1994	Defensor Lima		

International career
1986–1987	Peru	7	(0)
- * Club domestic league appearances and goals

Cedric Vásquez (born on 30 June 1959) is a retired Peruvian professional football player. He is a former Peru international.

== Club career ==
A central defender and defensive midfielder, Vásquez played professionally for at least 9 years (from 1985 to 1994). His first season in the top level of Peruvian football was the 1985 Torneo Descentralizado, in which he played for San Agustín. In 1986, he transferred to Deportivo Municipal, but came back to San Agustín after one season. In 1988, after having played the 1987 Copa América, he moved to Alianza Lima, and was involved in the so-called Clásico de la Vergüenza (the Derby of Shame), during which he was sent off after having insulted the match referee, César Pagano, along with teammate Wilmar Valencia. He then re-joined San Agustín, and he played there until 1992; in 1993 he moved to Sport Boys. He also played for Defensor Lima.

== International career ==
When he was a Deportivo Municipal player, Vásquez received a call-up to the Peru national team that played against Brazil on April 1, 1986, and made his international debut on that occasion. He was of the few players of that team to be confirmed for the 1987 season, and was selected to be part of the Peru squad for the 1987 Copa América. He played 4 more games in 1987, 2 of which during the Copa América. He was sent off during the Peru-Ecuador match on July 4, 1987. He also played for the Peru youth team during the 1986 Nehru Cup. He totaled 7 caps.
