= Gonzalo Díaz (Uruguayan footballer) =

Uruguayan footballer (born 1966)

Personal information
- Date of birth: 14 April 1966 (age 60)
- Place of birth: Fray Bentos, Uruguay

International career
Years	Team	Apps	(Gls)
1987	Uruguay	1	(0)

Gonzalo Díaz (born 14 April 1966) is a Uruguayan former footballer. He played in one match for the Uruguay national football team in 1987. He was also part of Uruguay's squad for the 1987 Copa América tournament.
