= Pablo Marin =

Belizean politician

Member of the Belize House of Representatives for Corozal Bay
- Incumbent
- Assumed office 7 February 2008
- Preceded by: Juan Vildo Marin

Personal details
- Party: United Democratic Party

Paul Marin, also known as Pablo Marin, is a Belizean politician. He has represented the Corozal Bay constituency in the Belize House since 2008. A member of the United Democratic Party, he is the current Minister of Health of Belize. In 2010, he received a United Nations award for excellence in public service.
