= Rómer Roca =

Bolivian footballer (born 1966)

Personal information
- Date of birth: 1 July 1966 (age 60)
- Place of birth: Santa Cruz de la Sierra, Bolivia

International career
Years	Team	Apps	(Gls)
1987–1989	Bolivia	9	(0)

Rómer Roca (born 1 July 1966) is a Bolivian footballer. He played in nine matches for the Bolivia national football team from 1987 to 1989. He was also part of Bolivia's squad for the 1987 Copa América tournament.
