= Pedro Acosta (footballer) =

Venezuelan footballer (born 1959)

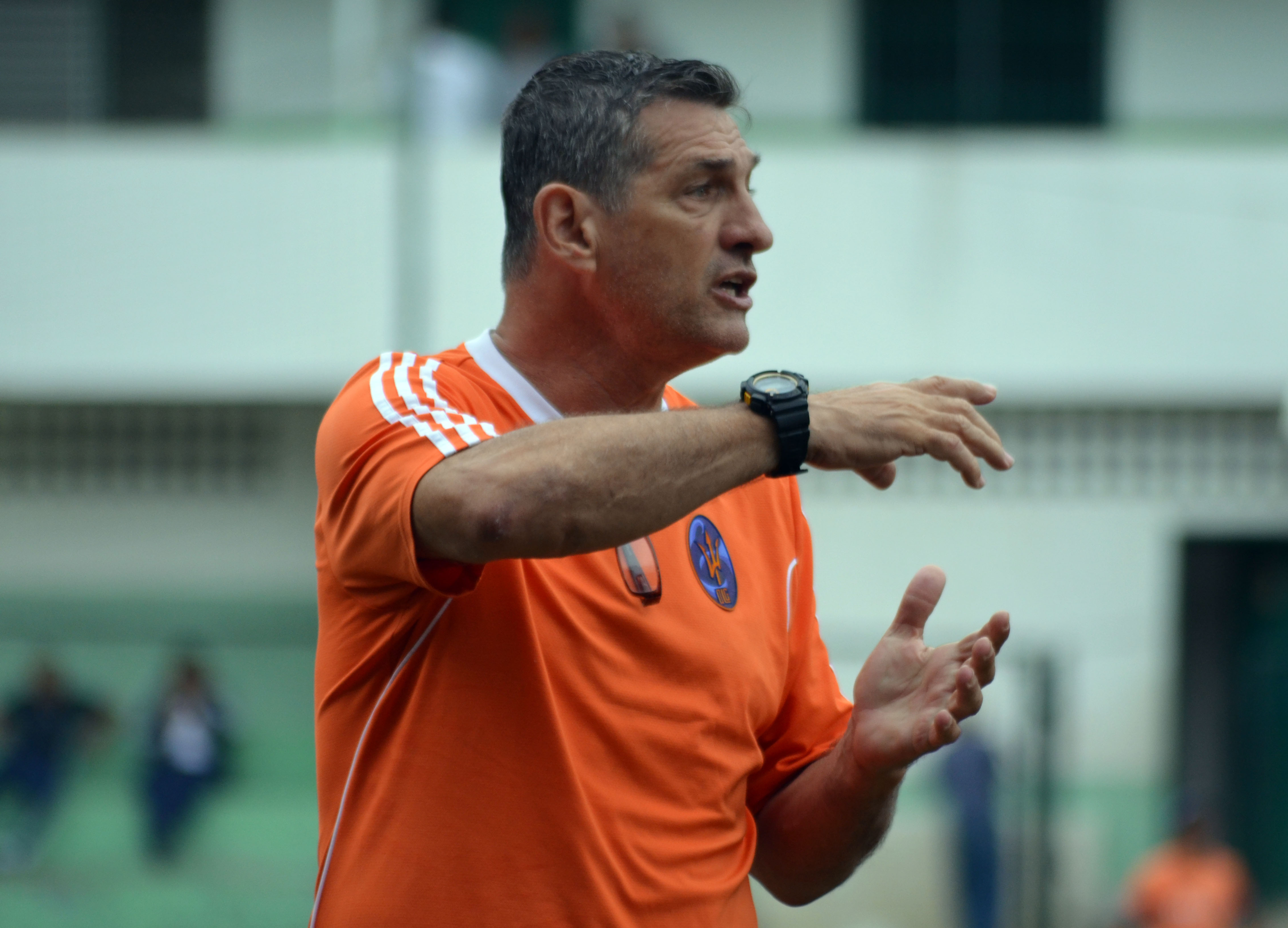

Personal information
- Full name: Pedro Javier Acosta Sánchez
- Date of birth: 28 November 1959 (age 66)
- Place of birth: Caracas, Venezuela
- Position: Defender

Youth career
- La Hermandad Gallega

Senior career*
Years	Team	Apps	(Gls)
1977–1983	Deportivo Galicia		
1983–1985	Deportivo Portugués		
1985	Atlético San Cristobal		
1985–1987	Marítimo		
1987–1989	Caracas		
1989–1992	Marítimo		
1992–1993	Deportivo Galicia		

International career
1979–1989	Venezuela	34	(2)

Managerial career
- 2014: La Hermandad Gallega
- 2018: Deportivo La Guaira
- 2020–2021: Universidad Central
- * Club domestic league appearances and goals

Pedro Javier Acosta Sánchez (born 28 November 1959) is a Venezuelan football manager and former player who played as a defender.

== Club career ==
Acosta played for Deportivo Galicia, C.S. Marítimo de Venezuela and Caracas F.C.

== International career ==
Acosta made 34 appearances for the senior Venezuela national football team from 1979 to 1989, including participation at the 1979 Copa América, 1983 Copa América, 1987 Copa América and 1989 Copa América.

He also competed for Venezuela at the 1980 Summer Olympics in Moscow, Soviet Union, where the team was eliminated after the preliminary round.
