= Marcelino Blanco =

Paraguayan footballer (born 1966)

Personal information
- Full name: Marcelino Antero Blanco Espinoza
- Date of birth: 3 January 1966 (age 60)
- Position: Defender

Senior career*
Years	Team	Apps	(Gls)
1985–1988?	Sol de América		
1990	Club Guaraní		
1992	Santos		
1993	Aucas		

International career
1987	Paraguay	1	(0)
- * Club domestic league appearances and goals

Marcelino Blanco (born 3 January 1966) is a retired Paraguayan football defender.
