= Zdenko Morovic =

Venezuelan footballer (1966–2024)

Zdenko Morović
Personal information
- Full name: Zdenko Morović Belfrain
- Date of birth: 31 August 1966
- Place of birth: Rijeka, SR Croatia, Yugoslavia
- Date of death: 12 February 2024 (aged 57)
- Position: Midfielder

Senior career*
Years	Team	Apps	(Gls)
1985–1988	Deportivo Italia		
1989–1991	CS Marítimo		
1991–1993	Caracas FC		

International career
1987–1989	Venezuela	5	(0)
- * Club domestic league appearances and goals

Zdenko Morović Belfrain (31 August 1966 – 12 February 2024) was a Venezuelan footballer who played as a midfielder. He made five appearances for the Venezuela national team from 1987 to 1989. He was also part of Venezuela's squad for the 1987 Copa América tournament. Morovic died on 12 February 2024, at the age of 57.
