= Alex Martínez (footballer, born 1959) =

Chilean footballer

Personal information
- Full name: Alejandro Patricio Martínez Tapia
- Date of birth: 26 October 1959 (age 66)
- Position: Defender

Senior career*
Years	Team	Apps	(Gls)
1981-1985	San Luis de Quillota		
1986-1989	Universidad Católica		
1990	Lozapenco		
1990-1991	Universidad de Chile		
1992	San Luis de Quillota		
1993	Everton		
1994-1996	San Luis de Quillota		

International career
1986-1987	Chile	4	(0)
- * Club domestic league appearances and goals

Alejandro Patricio "Alex" Martínez Tapia (born 26 October 1959) is a Chilean former footballer.
