= Carlos Enríquez (footballer) =

Ecuadorian footballer (born 1966)

Personal information
- Date of birth: 22 May 1966 (age 60)

International career
Years	Team	Apps	(Gls)
1987	Ecuador	1	(0)

Carlos Enríquez (born 22 May 1966) is an Ecuadorian footballer. He played in one match for the Ecuador national football team in 1987. He was also part of Ecuador's squad for the 1987 Copa América tournament.
