= Luis Mosquera (footballer, born 1964) =

Ecuadorian footballer

Personal information
- Date of birth: 14 December 1964 (age 61)
- Place of birth: Quito, Ecuador
- Position: Defender

Senior career*
Years	Team	Apps	(Gls)
1982–1993	El Nacional		
1994–1998	Deportivo Quito		
1999	ESPOLI		
2000	Aucas		

International career
1987–1988	Ecuador	8	(0)
- * Club domestic league appearances and goals

Luis Mosquera (born 14 December 1964) is an Ecuadorian footballer. He played in eight matches for the Ecuador national football team from 1987 to 1988. In doing so, he was part of Ecuador's squad for the 1987 Copa América tournament.
