= Oscar Ramírez (footballer, born 1961) =

Bolivian footballer

Personal information
- Date of birth: 29 July 1961 (age 65)

International career
| Years | Team | Apps | (Gls) |
| 1985–1987 | Bolivia | 8 | (0) |

Oscar Ramírez (born 29 July 1961) is a Bolivian footballer. He played in eight matches for the Bolivia national football team from 1985 to 1987. He was also part of Bolivia's squad for the 1987 Copa América tournament.
