= Pablo Marín (footballer, born 1965) =

Ecuadorian footballer

Personal information
- Date of birth: 22 August 1965 (age 61)

International career
Years	Team	Apps	(Gls)
1987–1988	Ecuador	16	(0)

Pablo Marín (born 22 August 1965) is an Ecuadorian footballer. He played in 16 matches for the Ecuador national football team from 1987 to 1988. He was also part of Ecuador's squad for the 1987 Copa América tournament.
