= Juan Jácome =

Ecuadorian footballer (born 1960)

Personal information
- Date of birth: 6 November 1960 (age 65)
- Place of birth: Quito, Ecuador

International career
Years	Team	Apps	(Gls)
1987	Ecuador	2	(0)

Juan Jácome (born 6 November 1960) is an Ecuadorian footballer. He played in two matches for the Ecuador national football team in 1987. He was also part of Ecuador's squad for the 1987 Copa América tournament.
