= Corozal Bay (Belize House constituency) =

- Constituency for the Belize House of Representatives
- District: Corozal
- Electorate: 6,768 (2015)
- Major settlements: Corozal Town (part)

Current constituency
- Created: 1984
- Party: People's United Party
- Area Representative: Elvia Vega-Samos

Corozal Bay is an electoral constituency in the Corozal District represented in the House of Representatives of the National Assembly of Belize since 2021 by Elvia Vega-Samos of the People's United Party (PUP).

== Profile ==
The Corozal Bay constituency was one of 10 new seats created for the 1984 general election. By far the smallest of the four constituencies in the Corozal District geographically, Corozal Bay consists of most of the district's capital, Corozal Town.

== Area representatives ==
Election	Area representative	Party
1984	Israel Alpuche	UDP
1989	Juan Vildo Marin	PUP
1993	Juan Vildo Marin	PUP
1998	Juan Vildo Marin	PUP
2003	Juan Vildo Marin	PUP
2008	Pablo Marin	UDP
2012	Pablo Marin	UDP
2015	Pablo Marin	UDP
2020	David Vega	PUP
2021 by-election	Elvia Vega-Samos	PUP

== Elections ==
Election	Political result	Candidate	Party	Votes	%	±%
2012 general election Electorate: 6,237; Turnout: 4,652 (74.59%) −3.06	UDP hold Majority: 148 (3.18%) −16.31	Pablo Marin	UDP	2,340	50.3	−9.06
2012 general election Electorate: 6,237; Turnout: 4,652 (74.59%) −3.06	UDP hold Majority: 148 (3.18%) −16.31	Gregorio "Papas" Garcia	PUP	2,192	47.12	+7.25
2012 general election Electorate: 6,237; Turnout: 4,652 (74.59%) −3.06	UDP hold Majority: 148 (3.18%) −16.31	Carlos Javier Sawers	VIP	50	1.07	-
2008 general election Electorate: 5,352; Turnout: 4,156 (77.65%) +0.71	UDP gain from PUP; Majority: 810 (19.49%) +13.03	Pablo Marin	UDP	2,467	59.36	+14.34
2008 general election Electorate: 5,352; Turnout: 4,156 (77.65%) +0.71	UDP gain from PUP; Majority: 810 (19.49%) +13.03	Juan Vildo Marin	PUP	1,657	39.87	−11.61
2003 general election Electorate: 5,274; Turnout: 4,058 (76.94%) −10.73	PUP hold Majority: 262 (6.46%) −18.7	Juan Vildo Marin	PUP	2,089	51.48	−10.72
2003 general election Electorate: 5,274; Turnout: 4,058 (76.94%) −10.73	PUP hold Majority: 262 (6.46%) −18.7	Carlos Castillo	UDP	1,827	45.02	+7.98
2003 general election Electorate: 5,274; Turnout: 4,058 (76.94%) −10.73	PUP hold Majority: 262 (6.46%) −18.7	Roy Rodriguez	Independent	86	2.12	-
1998 general election Electorate: 4,031; Turnout: 3,534 (87.67%) +3.8	PUP hold Majority: 889 (25.16%) +18.16	Juan Vildo Marin	PUP	2,198	62.2	+8.7
1998 general election Electorate: 4,031; Turnout: 3,534 (87.67%) +3.8	PUP hold Majority: 889 (25.16%) +18.16	Willard Levy	UDP	1,309	37.04	−9.46
1993 general election Electorate: 3,868; Turnout: 3,244 (83.87%) +7.61	PUP hold Majority: 197 (7.0%) +3.7	Juan Vildo Marin	PUP	1,526	53.5	+3.0
1993 general election Electorate: 3,868; Turnout: 3,244 (83.87%) +7.61	PUP hold Majority: 197 (7.0%) +3.7	Paulino Montalvo	UDP	1,329	46.5	−0.7
1989 general election Electorate: 3,336; Turnout: 2,544 (76.26%) −0.13	PUP gain from UDP; Majority: 84 (3.3%) −6.1	Juan Vildo Marin	PUP	1,285	50.5	+7.8
1989 general election Electorate: 3,336; Turnout: 2,544 (76.26%) −0.13	PUP gain from UDP; Majority: 84 (3.3%) −6.1	Israel Alpuche	UDP	1,201	47.2	−9.2
1984 general election Electorate: 2,563; Turnout: 1,958 (76.39%) n/a	UDP win Majority: 9.4% (n/a)	Israel Alpuche	UDP		56.4	-
1984 general election Electorate: 2,563; Turnout: 1,958 (76.39%) n/a	UDP win Majority: 9.4% (n/a)	Gregorio Garcia	PUP		42.7	-
