= Corozal Town =

Town in Corozal, Belize

- Town
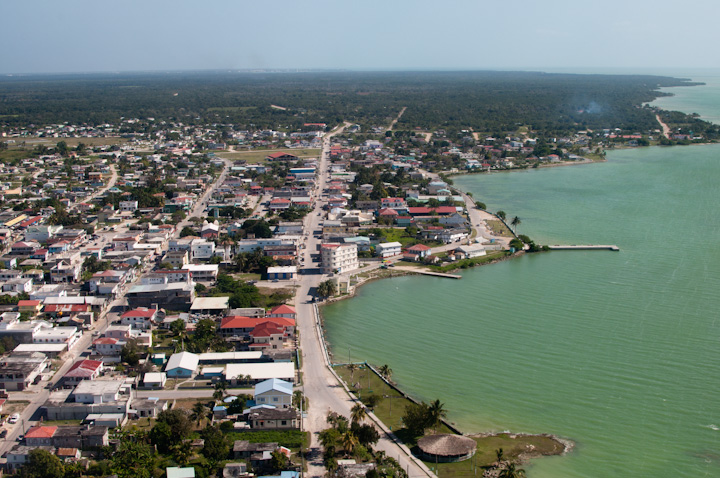
- Aerial of Corozal Town

- Location within Belize
- Coordinates: 18°24′N 88°24′W
- Country: Belize
- District: Corozal
- Constituency: Corozal Bay, Corozal North

Government
  - Mayor •Area Representative Corozal North •Area Representative Corozal Bay •Area Representative Corozal South East •Area Representative Corozal South West: Rigo Vellos (PUP) Hon. Hugo Patt (UDP) Hon. Elvia Vega Samos (PUP) Hon. Florencio Marin jr. (PUP) Hon. Ramiro Ramirez (PUP)
- Elevation: 0 m (0 ft)

Population (2010)
  - Total: 10,287
  - Estimate (2017): 13,502
- Demonym: Corozaleño(a)
- Time zone: UTC-6 (Central)
- Climate: Aw
- Website: corozal.com

Corozal is a town in Belize, capital of Corozal District. Corozal is located about 84 miles north of Belize City, and 9 miles from the border with Mexico. The population of Corozal, according to the main results of the 2010 census, is 9,871.

Corozal was a private estate before becoming a town in the 1840s, mostly settled by Maya Mestizo refugees from the Caste War of Yucatán. Much of the town was built over an ancient Maya city, sometimes known as Santa Rita; this may have been the original Pre-Columbian town called Chactemal, which extended from present day Corozal to Chetumal, Mexico. Corozal Town was badly damaged by Hurricane Janet in 1955 and was substantially rebuilt afterward.

== History ==
Corozal, the northmost town in Belize, was founded in 1848 by refugees from the Maya Indian uprising against the Spanish in neighboring Yucatán. This uprising, known as the Caste War of Yucatán (from the Spanish "castes" or race), began as a war against the Spaniards, but it eventually became a war against the Mestizos. The Mestizos, half Spanish and half Indian, had proved to be formidable allies of the Spaniards and were thus mortal enemies of the Maya Indians.

A massacre at Bacalar, Mexico — a Mestizo stronghold about thirty miles north of Corozal Town — finally led to the exodus of thousands of Mestizos from Bacalar and the surrounding area. Between 1848 and 1856 more than 10,000 refugees crossed the Rio Hondo, the river that now serves as a boundary between Belize and Mexico. These immigrants sought refuge in northern Belize and increased the population of Corozal Town to 4500. Mr. James Blake, a magistrate, let them settle on lands in the Corozal District and helped them to establish the new crop — sugar cane.

The Mestizo refugees were far from safe in Corozal Town as the Maya Indians from the Mexican base in Santa Cruz Bravo — today Carrillo Puerto — made several incursions in Corozal Town. In defense, Corozal became a garrison town and Fort Barlee was built here in 1870. Today, the brick corner supports of the fort surround the post office complex of the buildings across from the central town square.

The immigrants brought with them Maya Mestizo culture: Spanish and Yucatec Maya language, Catholicism and Maya folklore, the use of alcalde, their family structure and way of life. Soon, there emerged a local replication of the society of the Yucatán within the boundaries of a country ruled by English expatriates.

Across the bay from Corozal Town are the mounds of Cerros, the first Maya coastal trading center. Cerros is considered one of the most important late preclassic Maya sites because it represented the first experiment with kingship in the Maya world. The remains include a number of temples, plazas, ball courts, canals, and minor structures. The most interesting artifacts so far discovered are the five jade head pendants.

Within Corozal, itself can be found another Maya ruin from the fourteenth century AD. Known as Santa Rita, the pyramid site sits atop the remains of a Maya city that dominated the area for more than 2000 years, and burial sites rich in jewelry and artifacts have been unearthed there. The monument is said to be the center of ancient Chactemal, the Maya capital of the area at the time of the first Spanish attempt to conquer the Yucatec Mayas in the early 16th century. The ruin of Santa Rita is located near the town's Hospital and is surrounded by the villages of San Andres, San Antonio, and Paraiso. An estimated 90% of the town was destroyed by Hurricane Janet in 1955, and most of the present structures post-date that hurricane.

The town is served by Corozal Hospital.

== Climate ==
Climate data for Corozal Town (1981–2010)
| Month | Jan | Feb | Mar | Apr | May | Jun | Jul | Aug | Sep | Oct | Nov | Dec | Year |
|---|---|---|---|---|---|---|---|---|---|---|---|---|---|
| Mean daily maximum °C (°F) | 28.3 (82.9) | 30.3 (86.5) | 31.6 (88.9) | 32.8 (91.0) | 33.1 (91.6) | 32.8 (91.0) | 32.6 (90.7) | 32.7 (90.9) | 33.0 (91.4) | 31.7 (89.1) | 29.9 (85.8) | 28.7 (83.7) | 31.5 (88.7) |
| Daily mean °C (°F) | 22.8 (73.0) | 24.5 (76.1) | 25.4 (77.7) | 26.7 (80.1) | 28.1 (82.6) | 28.3 (82.9) | 28.0 (82.4) | 27.9 (82.2) | 27.8 (82.0) | 26.6 (79.9) | 24.7 (76.5) | 23.5 (74.3) | 26.2 (79.2) |
| Mean daily minimum °C (°F) | 17.3 (63.1) | 18.7 (65.7) | 19.1 (66.4) | 20.7 (69.3) | 23.0 (73.4) | 23.8 (74.8) | 23.4 (74.1) | 23.2 (73.8) | 22.7 (72.9) | 21.6 (70.9) | 19.5 (67.1) | 18.2 (64.8) | 20.9 (69.6) |
| Average precipitation mm (inches) | 58.5 (2.30) | 31.9 (1.26) | 32.1 (1.26) | 45.7 (1.80) | 107.5 (4.23) | 216.8 (8.54) | 140.4 (5.53) | 172.6 (6.80) | 195.7 (7.70) | 193.7 (7.63) | 95.5 (3.76) | 64.8 (2.55) | 1,355.2 (53.36) |
| Average precipitation days (≥ 1.0 mm) | 7 | 4 | 3 | 3 | 6 | 13 | 11 | 12 | 13 | 12 | 9 | 7 | 100 |
Source: National Meteorological Service of Belize

== Demographics ==
At the time of the 2010 census, Corozal had a population of 10,287. Of these, 66.2% were Mestizo, 12.7% Creole, 9.4% Mixed, 3.1% East Indian, 2.5% Asian, 1.2% Garifuna, 1.1% Caucasian, 1.0% Hindu, 0.8% Ketchi Maya, 0.5% Lebanese, 0.5% Yucatec Maya, 0.3% African, 0.2% Mopan Maya, 0.2% Mennonite and 0.2% others.

In terms of languages spoken (multiple answers allowed), 77.8% spoke Spanish, 75.8% English, 35.1% Creole, 2.5% Mandarin or Cantonese, 1.0% Hindi, 0.8% Garifuna, 0.5% Yucatec Maya, 0.2% Ketchi Maya, 0.2% Mopan Maya, 0.1% German and 0.8% other languages; 0.2% could not speak.

== Image gallery ==
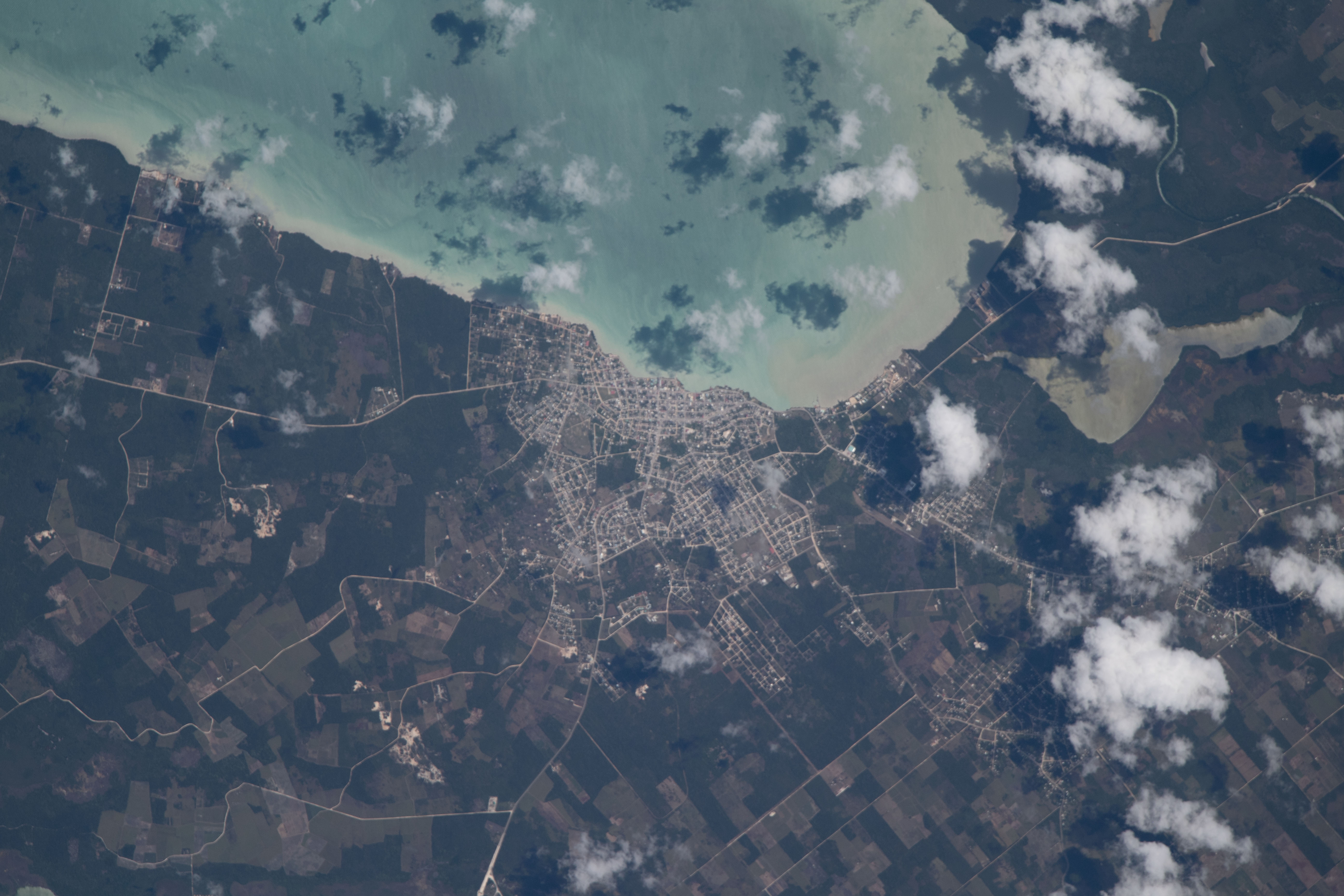
Satellite view of Corozal Town

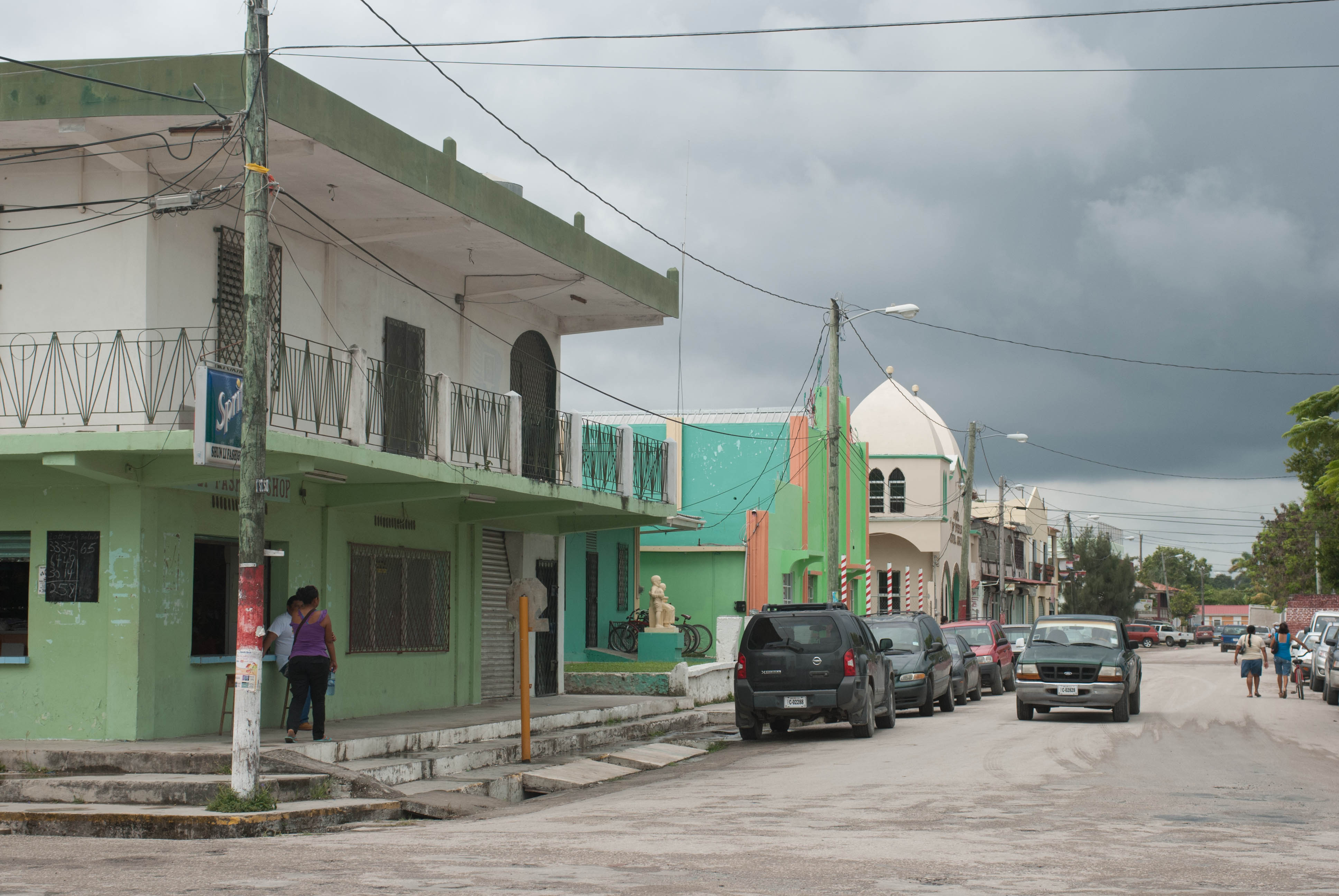
Corozal Town street on a gloomy day

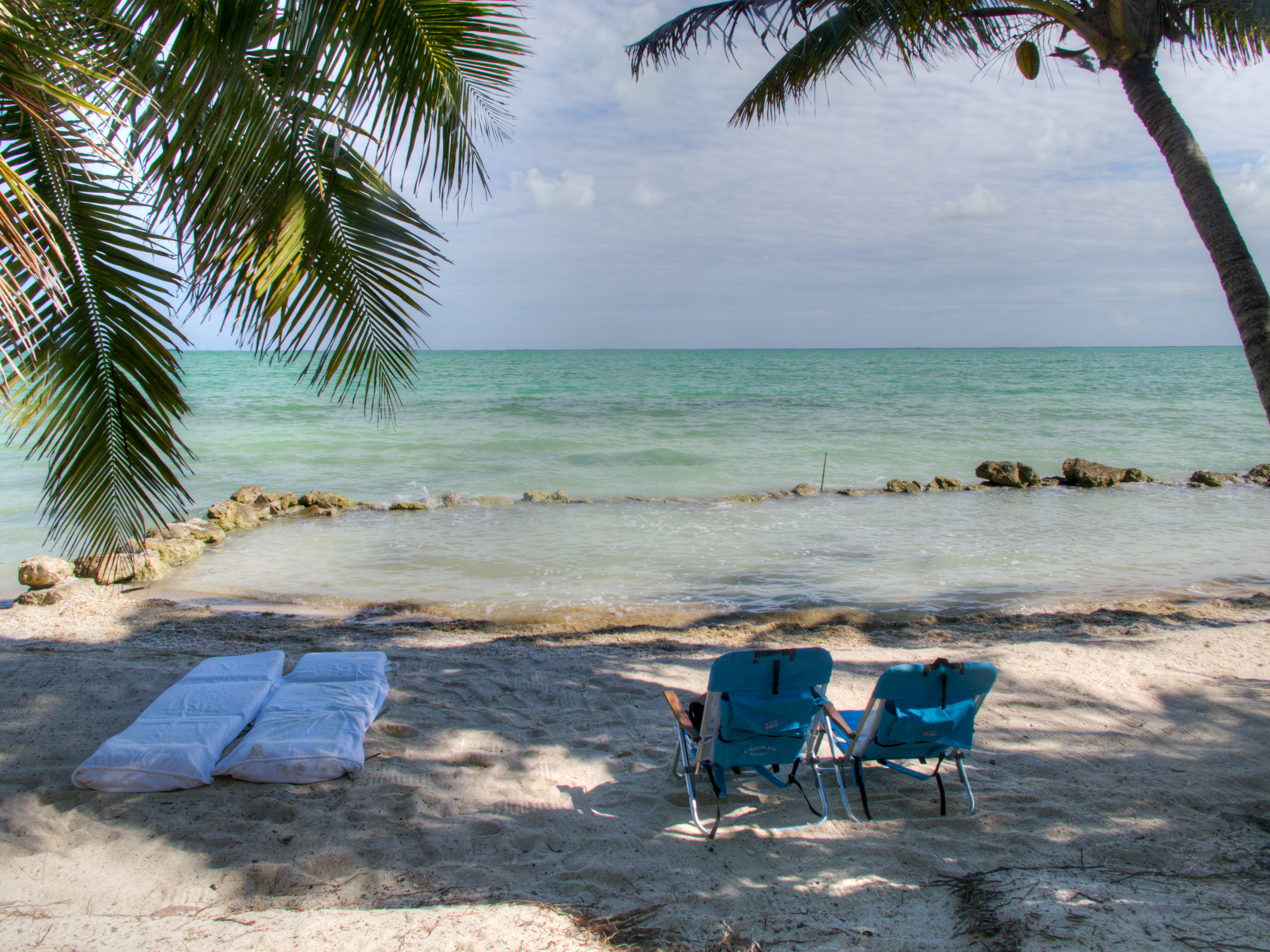
Corozal limestone beach

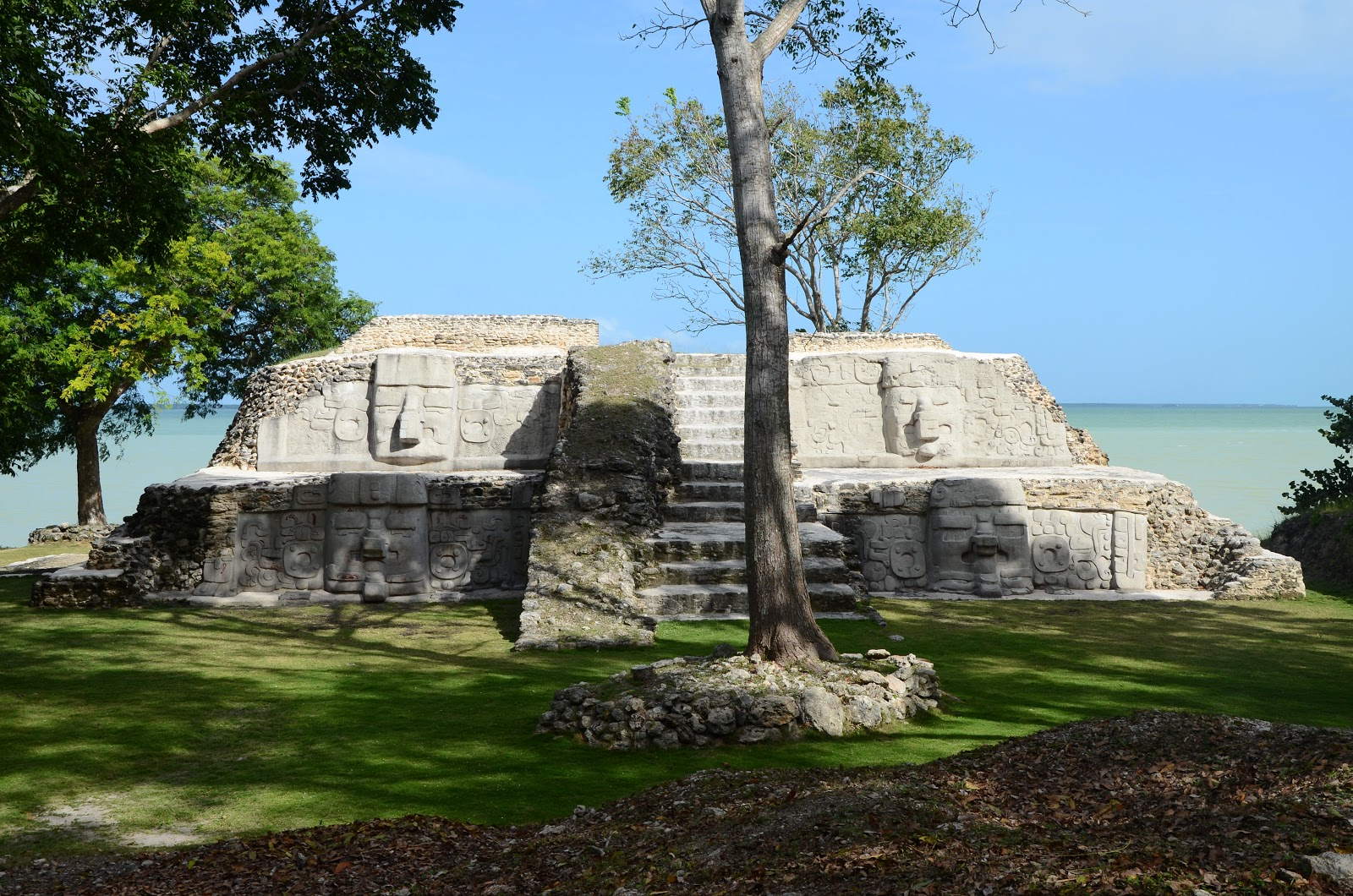
Cerros Ruins

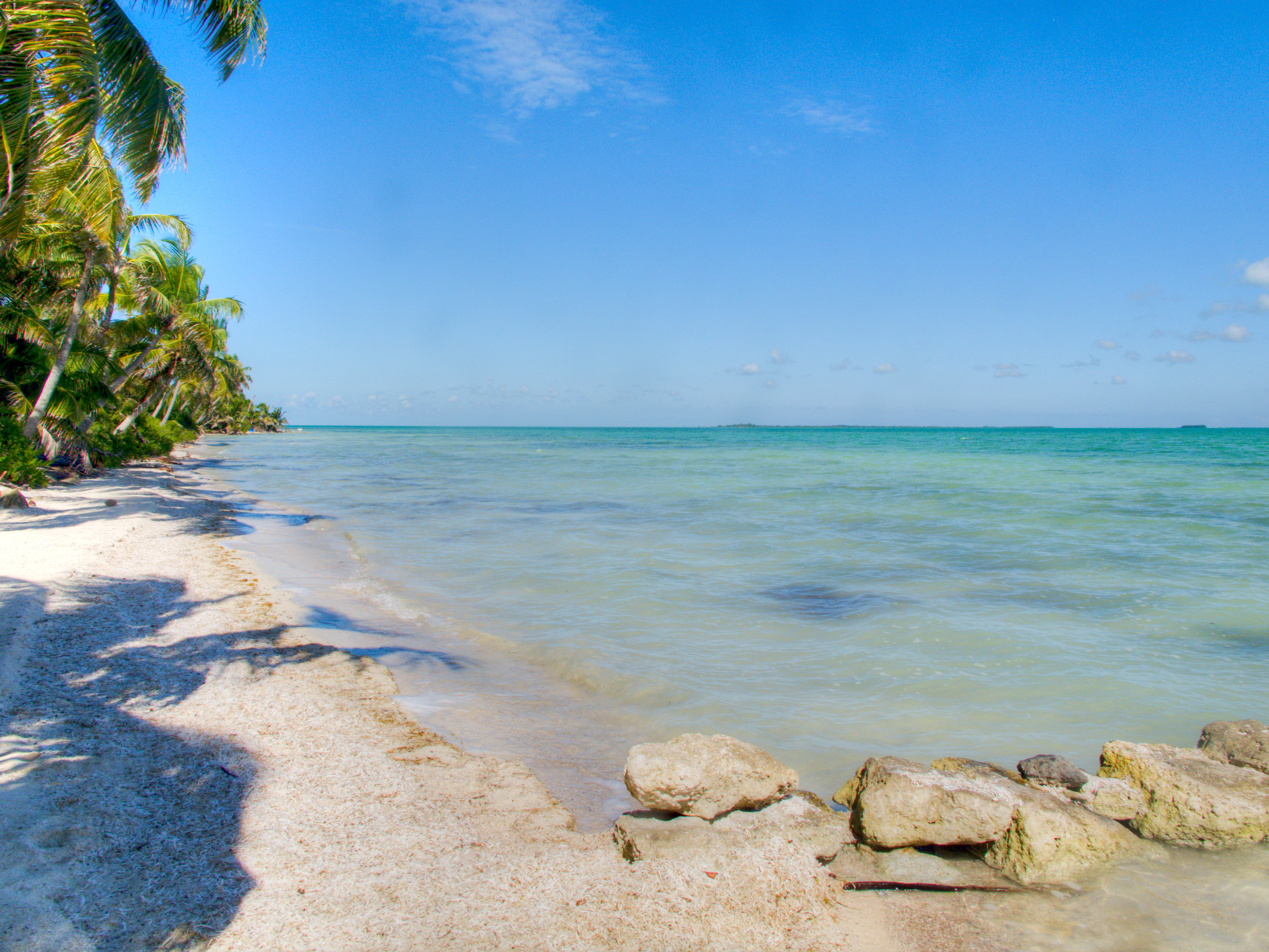
Another view of Corozal limestone beach

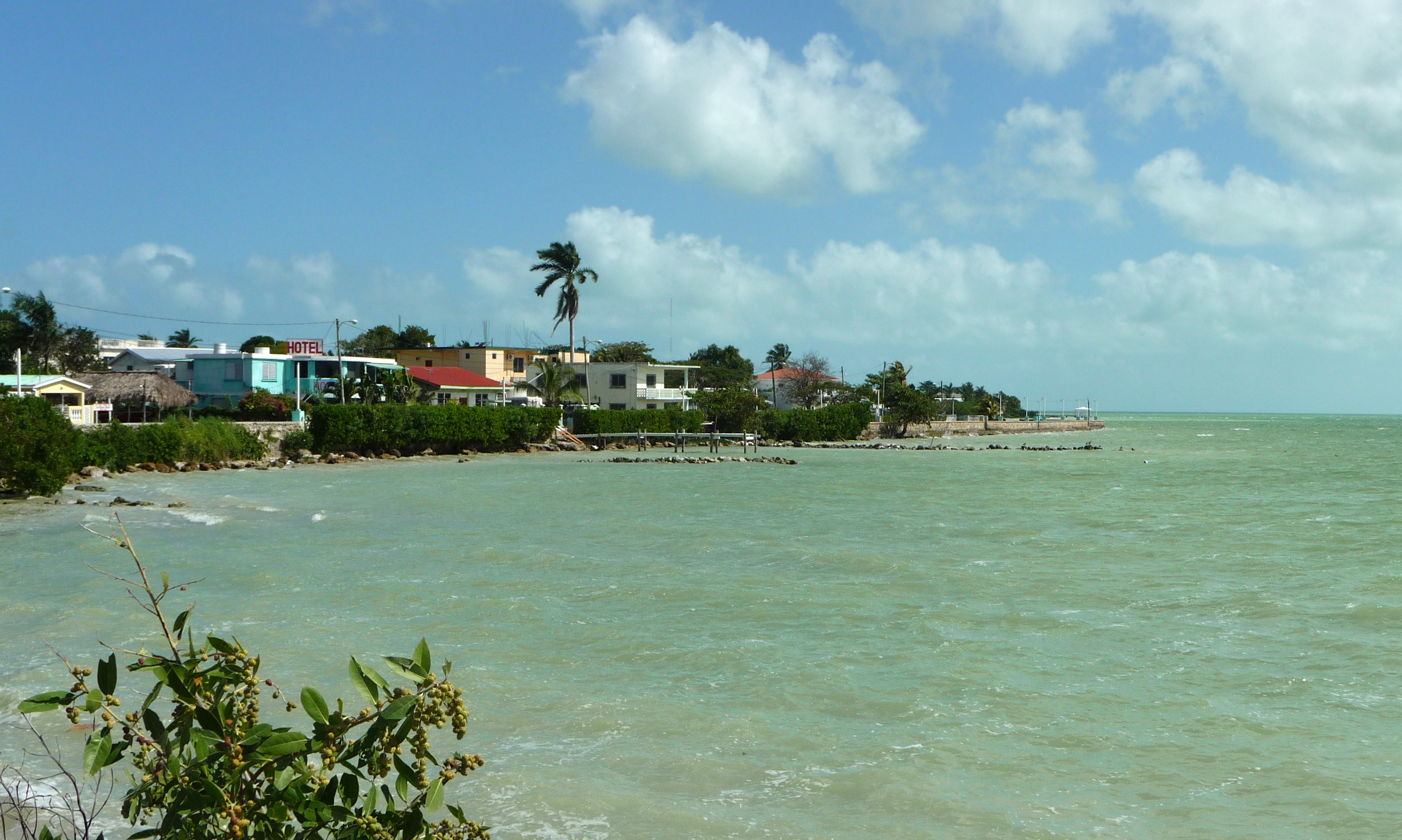
Corozal seafront

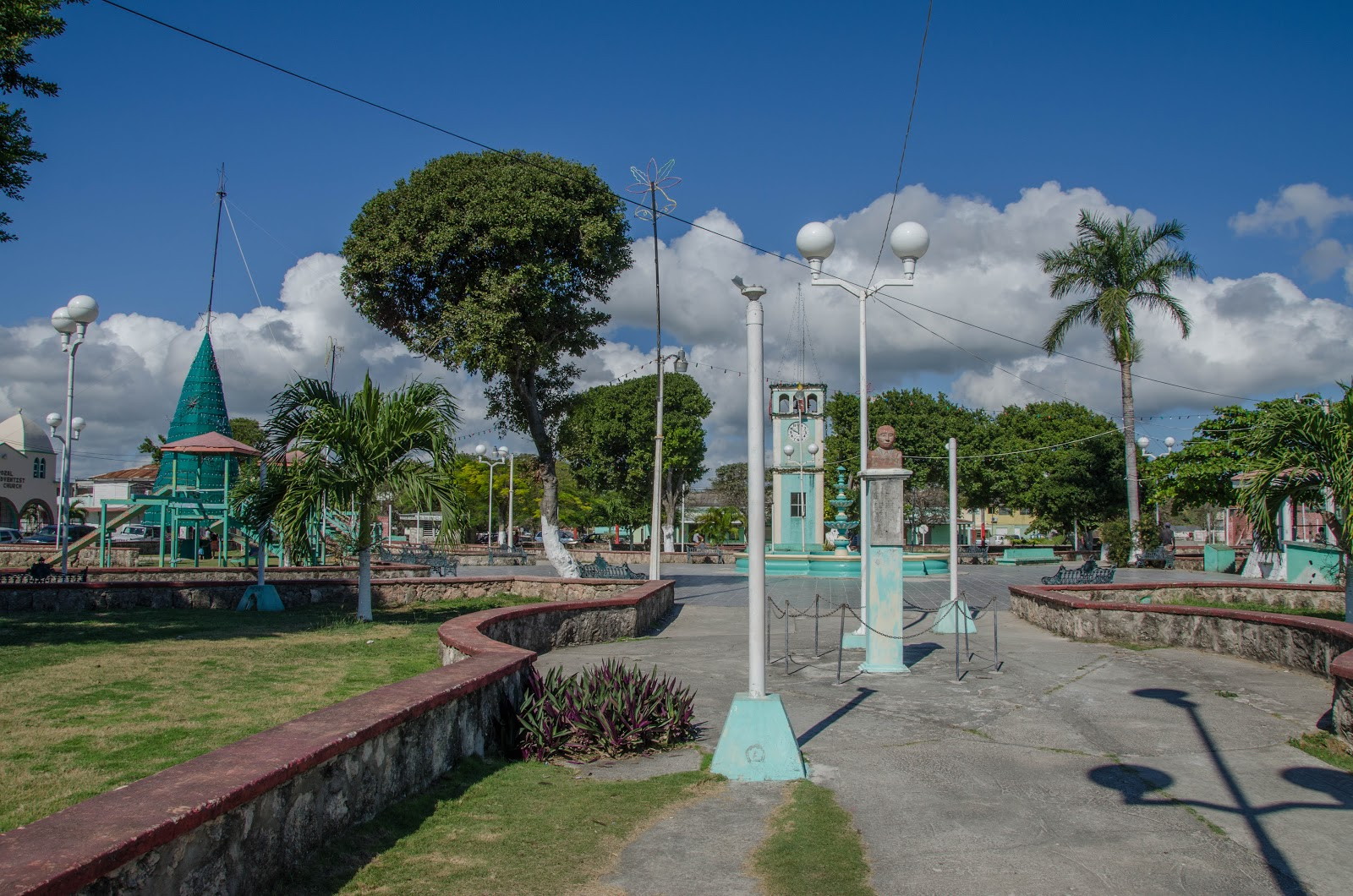
Corozal Town Park

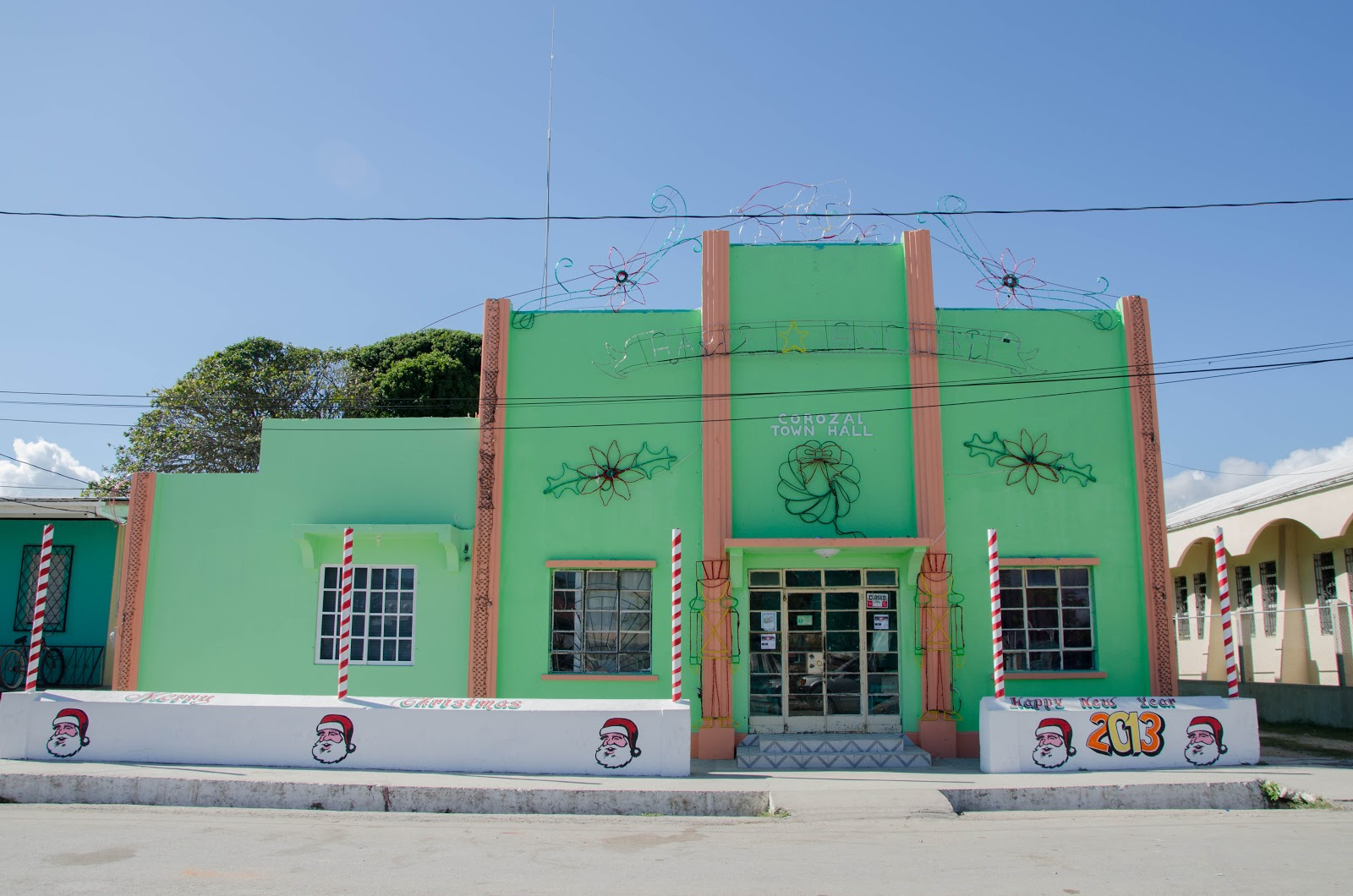
Corozal Town Hall

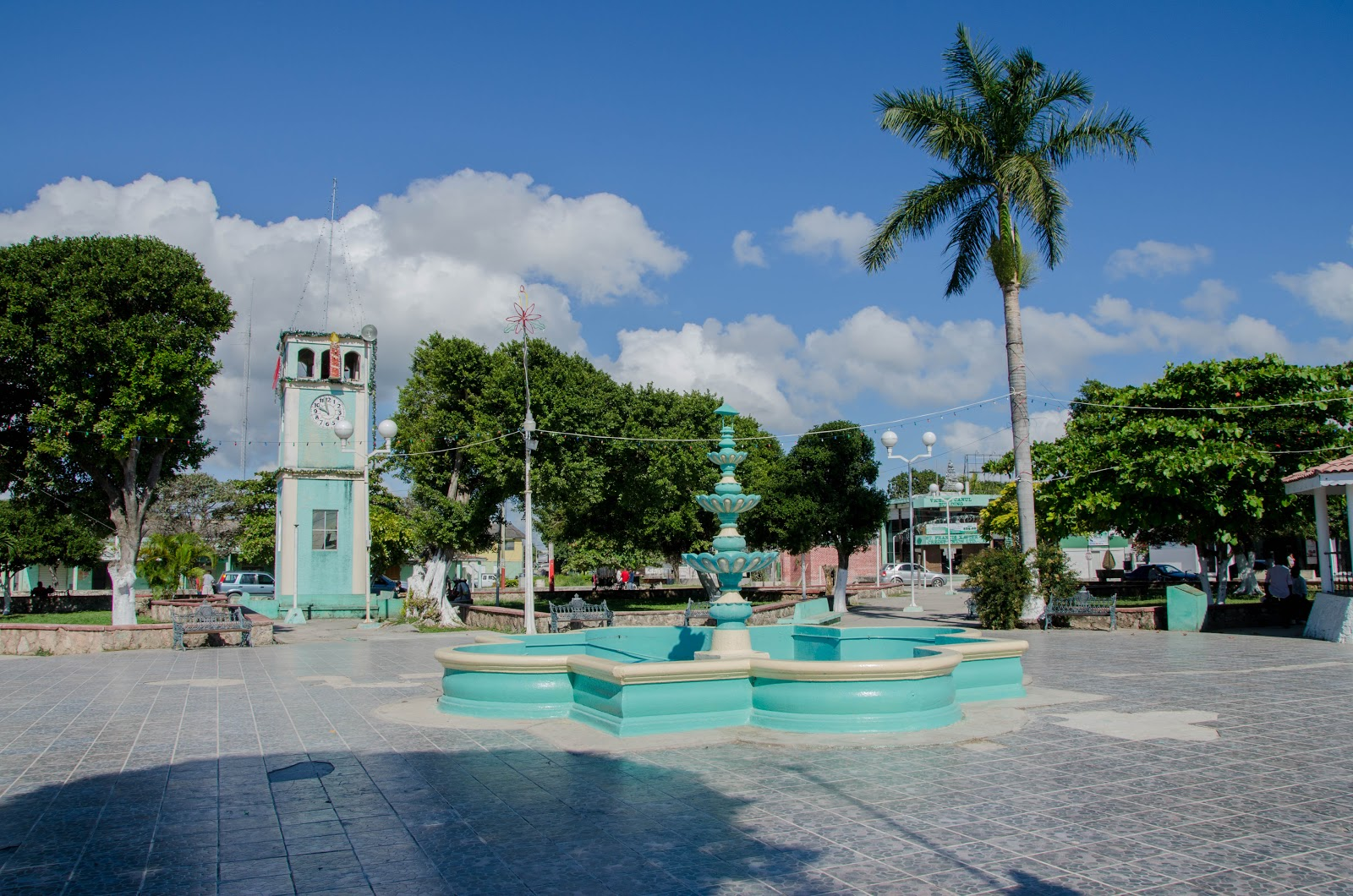
Corozal Town square

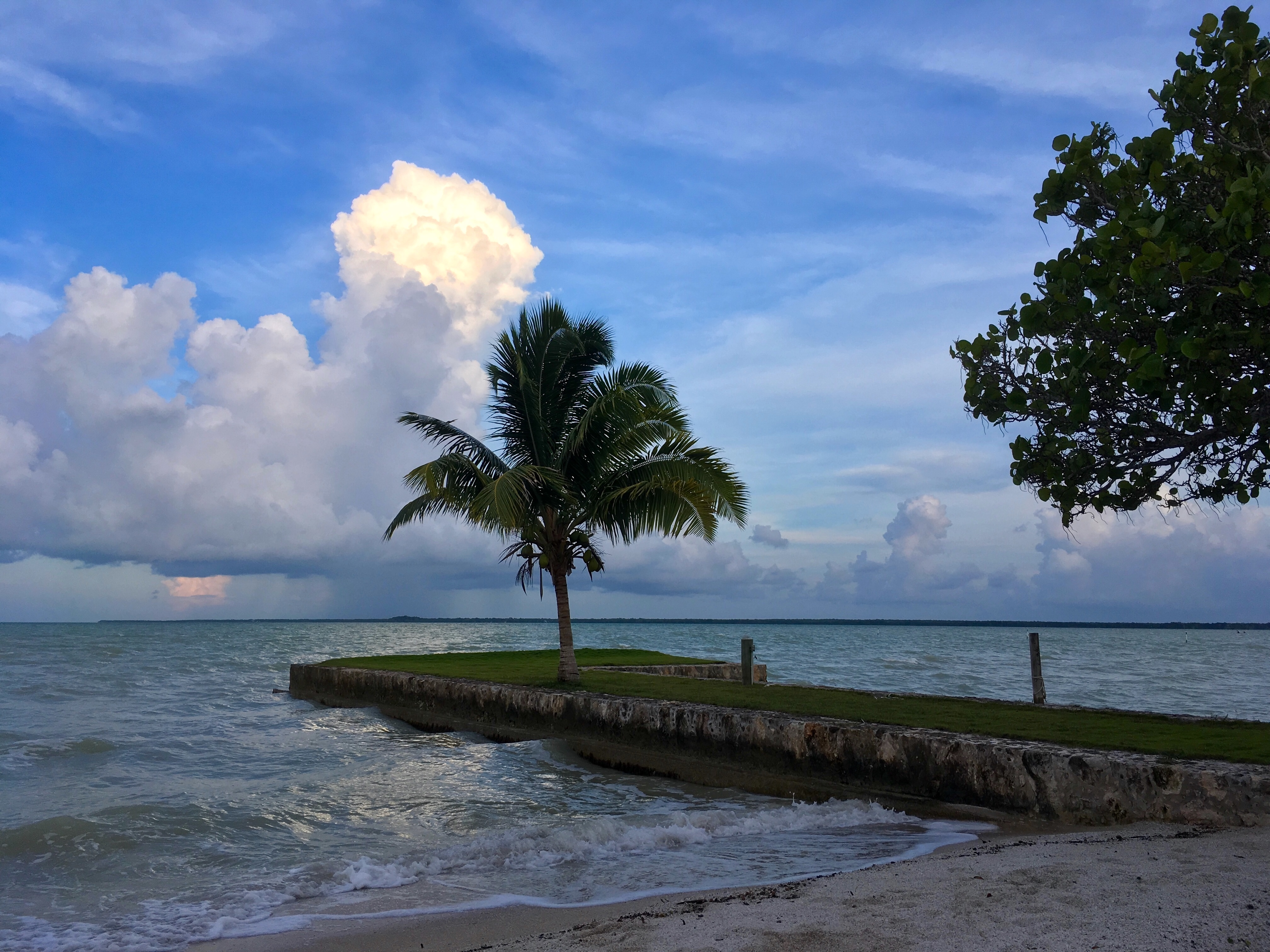
A storm looms off the Corozal coastline opposite the setting sun

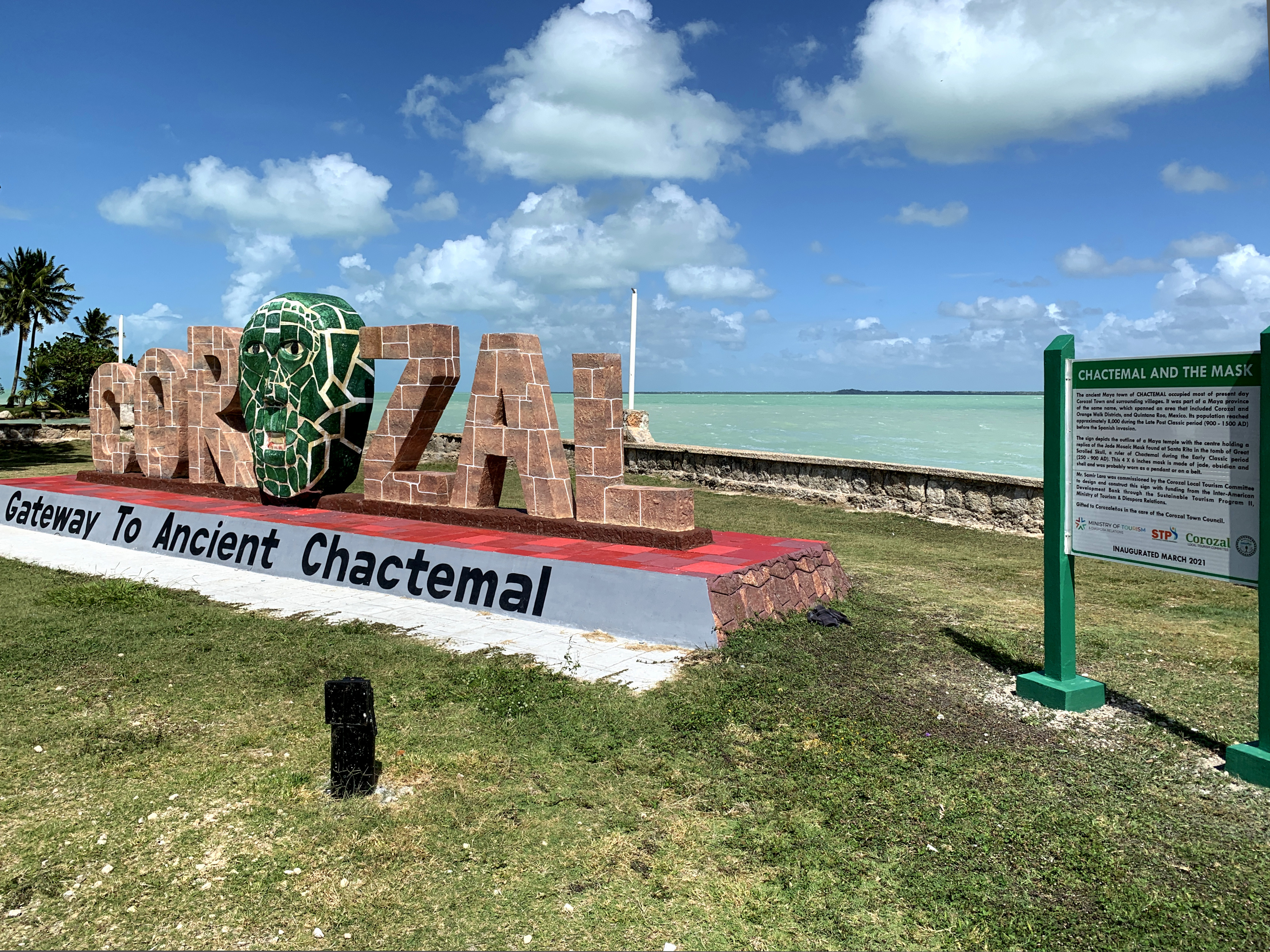
"Corozal Gateway to Ancient Chactemal" sign along Philip Goldson Highway in south Corozal Town

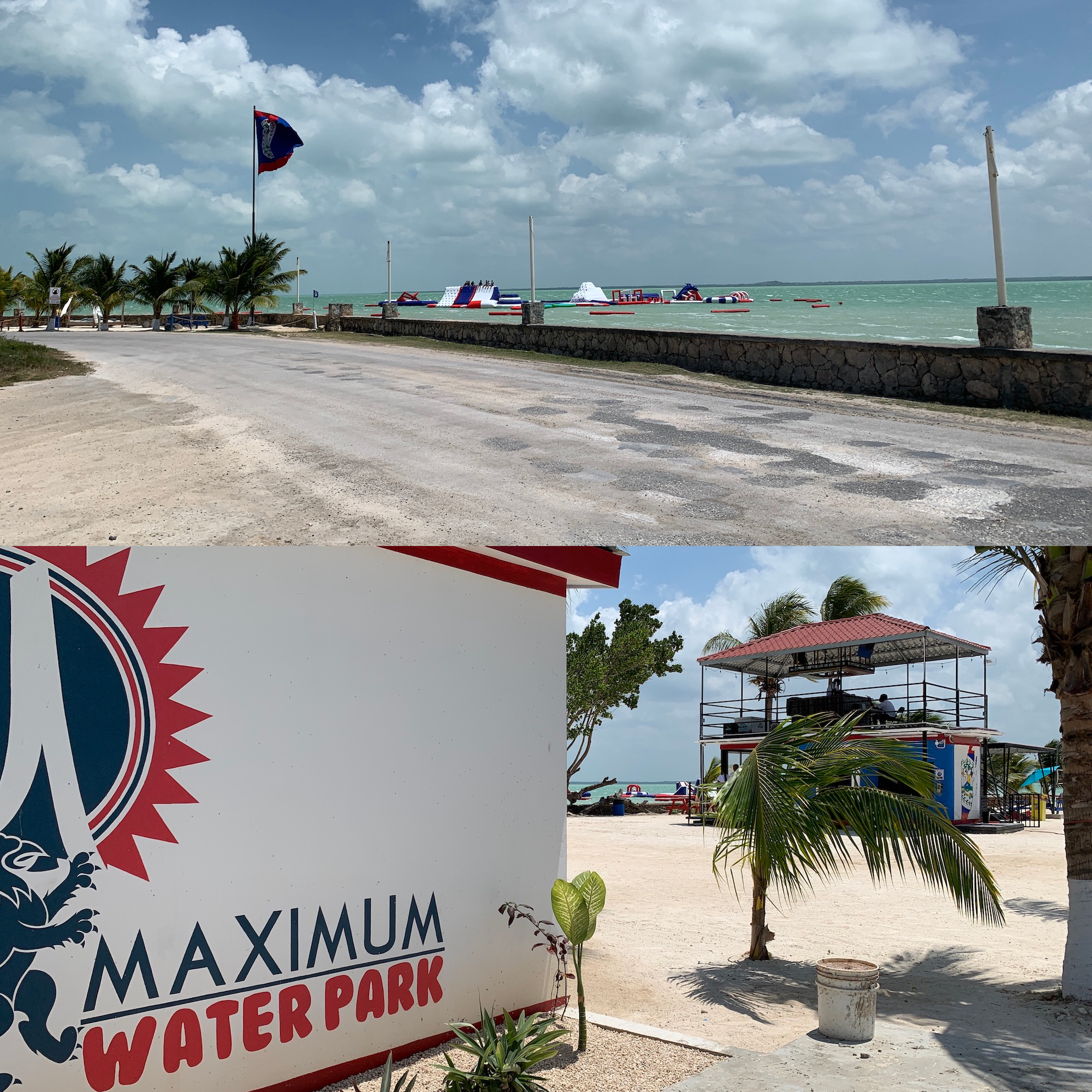
Maximum Water Park at Rainbow Park in Corozal Town

== Recreation ==
In June 2020, the Corozal Town Council led by Mayor Rigo Vellos received a development proposal for an eco-friendly, world-class water park. Maximum Water Park opened to the public in April 2021.
