= Luis Reyna =

Peruvian footballer (born 1959)

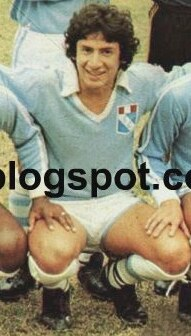
- Reyna in 1980

Personal information
- Full name: Luis Alberto Reyna Navarro
- Date of birth: 16 May 1959 (age 67)
- Place of birth: Huánuco, Peru
- Position: Midfielder

Senior career*
Years	Team	Apps	(Gls)
1978–1984	Sporting Cristal		
1985–1989	Universitario		

International career
1980–1989	Peru	39	(1)
- * Club domestic league appearances and goals

Luis Alberto Reyna Navarro (born 16 May 1959) is a footballer who played as a midfielder for Peru in the 1982 FIFA World Cup.

== Career ==
He earned 39 caps, scoring 1 goal between 1980 and 1989. He also played for Sporting Cristal. During the 1986 World Cup qualifiers, he was responsible for tightly marking Diego Maradona, effectively neutralizing him.
