= Juan Jairo Galeano =

Colombian footballer (born 1962)

Personal information
- Full name: Juan Jairo Galeano Restrepo
- Date of birth: 12 August 1962 (age 64)
- Place of birth: Andes, Colombia
- Position: Striker

Senior career*
Years	Team	Apps	(Gls)
1981–1991	Atlético Nacional		
1991	Millonarios		
1992	Envigado		
1993	Independiente Medellín		
1993	Deportivo Pereira		

International career
1987–1989	Colombia	11	(1)
- * Club domestic league appearances and goals

Juan Jairo Galeano Restrepo (born 12 August 1962) is a Colombian former footballer who played as a striker.

== Career ==
Born in Andes, Galeano played for Atlético Nacional, Millonarios, Envigado, Independiente Medellín and Deportivo Pereira.

He made 11 international appearances (scoring once) for Colombia, between 1987 and 1989.
