= 1987 Copa América =

Tournament details
- Host country: Argentina
- Dates: 27 June – 12 July
- Teams: 10 (from 1 confederation)
- Venues: 3 (in 3 host cities)

Final positions
- Champions: Uruguay (13th title)
- Runners-up: Chile
- Third place: Colombia
- Fourth place: Argentina

Tournament statistics
- Matches played: 13
- Goals scored: 33 (2.54 per match)
- Attendance: 263,000 (20,231 per match)
- Top scorer(s): (Colombia) Arnoldo Iguarán (4 goals)
- Best player: (Colombia) Carlos Valderrama

The 1987 Copa América was the 33rd edition of the Copa América, CONMEBOL's national team competition. It was the first Copa América under the new rotational hosting system. Argentina, as the first country alphabetically, hosted the tournament between 27 June and 12 July. Uruguay successfully defended their title, winning a record 13th Copa América.

== Venues ==
1987 Copa América is located in Argentina	Buenos Aires	Córdoba	Rosario
1987 Copa América is located in Argentina	Estadio; Monumental	Estadio Olímpico; Chateau Carreras	Estadio Gigante de Arroyito
1987 Copa América is located in Argentina	Capacity: 67,664	Capacity: 46,083	Capacity: 41,654

== Group stage ==
The teams were drawn into three groups, consisting of three teams each. Each team plays once against the other teams in their group and would receive 2 points for a win, 1 point for a draw, 0 points for a loss. The winner of each group advances to the semi-finals. Defending champions Uruguay received a bye into the semi-finals.

Uruguay qualified automatically as holders for the semifinal.

=== Group A ===
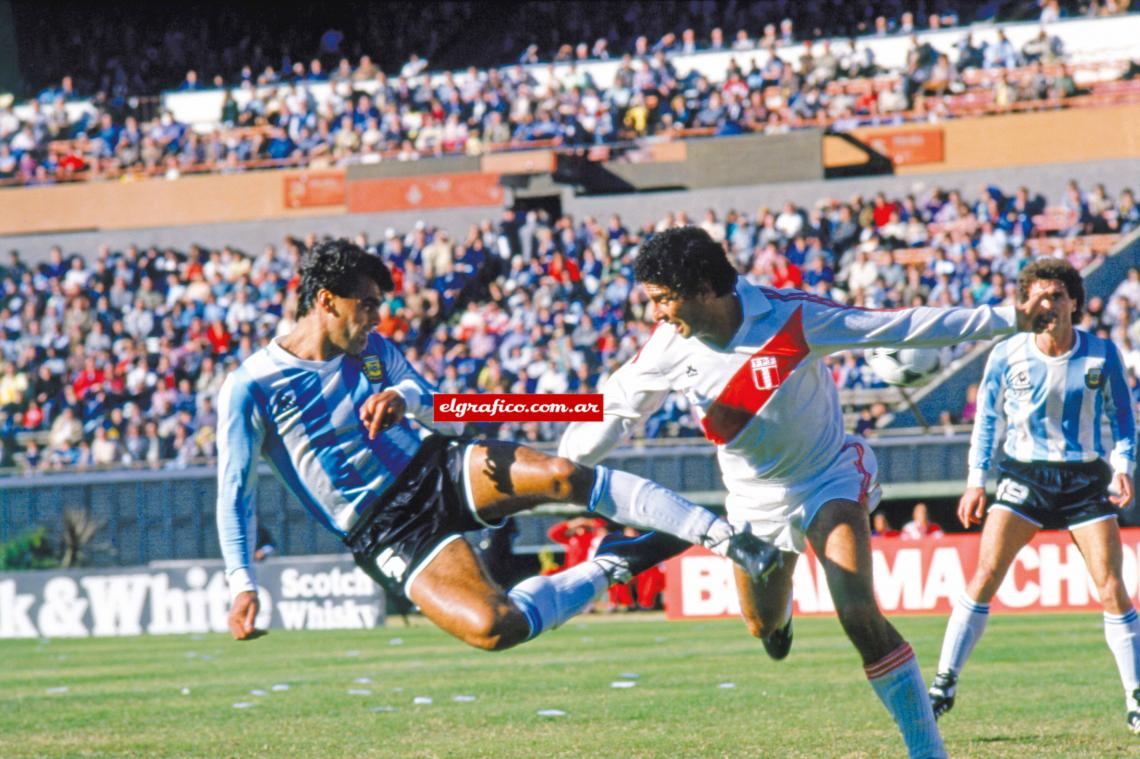
Argentina v Peru match

Team	Pld	W	D	L	GF	GA	GD	Pts
Argentina	2	1	1	0	4	1	+3	3
Peru	2	0	2	0	2	2	0	2
Ecuador	2	0	1	1	1	4	−3	1

27 June 1987

Argentina	1–1	Peru
Maradona 47'		Reyna 59'

Estadio Monumental, Buenos Aires
Attendance: 40,000
Referee: Armando Pérez Hoyos (Colombia)

2 July 1987

Argentina	3–0	Ecuador
Caniggia 50'; Maradona 67' (pen.), 85'

Estadio Monumental, Buenos Aires
Attendance: 30,000
Referee: Romualdo Arppi Filho (Brazil)

4 July 1987

Peru	1–1	Ecuador
La Rosa 90'		Cuvi 72'

Estadio Monumental, Buenos Aires
Attendance: 10,000
Referee: Asterio Martínez (Paraguay)

=== Group B ===
Team	Pld	W	D	L	GF	GA	GD	Pts
Chile	2	2	0	0	7	1	+6	4
Brazil	2	1	0	1	5	4	+1	2
Venezuela	2	0	0	2	1	8	−7	0

28 June 1987

Brazil	5–0	Venezuela
Edu Marangon 33'; Morovic 39' (o.g.); Careca 66'; Nelsinho 72'; Romário 89'	Report

Estadio Olímpico Chateau Carreras, Córdoba
Attendance: 8,000
Referee: Elias Jácome (Ecuador)

30 June 1987

Chile	3–1	Venezuela
Letelier 17'; Contreras 70'; Salgado 83'		Acosta 24' (pen.)

Estadio Olímpico Chateau Carreras, Córdoba
Attendance: 5,000
Referee: Luis Barrancos (Bolivia)

3 July 1987

Chile	4–0	Brazil
Basay 41', 68'; Letelier 48', 75'	Report

Estadio Olímpico Chateau Carreras, Córdoba
Attendance: 15,000
Referee: Juan Daniel Cardellino (Uruguay)

=== Group C ===
Team	Pld	W	D	L	GF	GA	GD	Pts
Colombia	2	2	0	0	5	0	+5	4
Bolivia	2	0	1	1	0	2	−2	1
Paraguay	2	0	1	1	0	3	−3	1

28 June 1987

Paraguay	0–0	Bolivia

Estadio Gigante de Arroyito, Rosario
Attendance: 5,000
Referee: Enrique Labo Revoredo (Peru)

1 July 1987

Colombia	2–0	Bolivia
Valderrama 34'; Iguarán 89'

Estadio Gigante de Arroyito, Rosario
Attendance: 5,000
Referee: Gastón Castro (Chile)

5 July 1987

Colombia	3–0	Paraguay
Iguarán 8', 34', 50'

Estadio Gigante de Arroyito, Rosario
Attendance: 10,000
Referee: Francisco Lamolina (Argentina)

== Knockout stage ==
Semi-finals
8 July - Córdoba
Chile	2
Colombia	1
9 July - Buenos Aires
Uruguay	1
Argentina	0

Final
12 July - Buenos Aires
Chile	0
Uruguay	1
Third place
11 July - Buenos Aires
Colombia	2
Argentina	1

=== Semi-finals ===
8 July 1987

Chile	2–1 (a.e.t.)	Colombia
Astengo 106'; Vera 108'		Redín 103' (pen.)

Chateau Carreras, Córdoba
Attendance: 10,000
Referee: Arppi Filho (Brazil)

9 July 1987

Uruguay	1–0	Argentina
Alzamendi 43'

Monumental, Buenos Aires
Attendance: 75,000
Referee: Jácome (Ecuador)

=== Third-place match ===
11 July 1987

Colombia	2–1	Argentina
Gómez 8'; Galeano 27'		Caniggia 86'

Monumental, Buenos Aires
Attendance: 15,000
Referee: Bernardo Corujo (Venezuela)

=== Final ===
12 July 1987

Uruguay	1–0	Chile
Bengoechea 56'

Monumental, Buenos Aires
Attendance: 35,000
Referee: Arppi Filho (Brazil)

== Champion ==
1987 Copa América champions

Uruguay
13th title

== Statistics ==
=== Goalscorers ===
With four goals, Arnoldo Iguarán was the top scorer in the tournament. There were 33 goals scored in 13 matches, for an average of 2.54 goals per match.

4 goals

- (Colombia) Arnoldo Iguarán

3 goals

- (Argentina) Diego Maradona
- (Chile) Juan Carlos Letelier

2 goals

- (Argentina) Claudio Caniggia
- (Chile) Ivo Basay

1 goal

- (Brazil) Careca
- (Brazil) Edú Marangón
- (Brazil) Nelsinho
- (Brazil) Romário
- (Chile) Fernando Astengo
- (Chile) Jorge Contreras
- (Chile) Sergio Salgado
- (Chile) Jaime Vera
- (Colombia) Juan Jairo Galeano
- (Colombia) Gabriel Gómez
- (Colombia) Bernardo Redín
- (Colombia) Carlos Valderrama
- (Ecuador) Hamilton Cuvi
- (Peru) Eugenio La Rosa
- (Peru) Luis Reyna
- (Uruguay) Antonio Alzamendi
- (Uruguay) Pablo Bengoechea
- (Venezuela) Pedro Acosta

1 own goal

- (Venezuela) Zdenko Morovic (against Brazil)

=== Team of the Tournament ===
By El Gráfico.

Goalkeepers	Defenders	Midfielders	Forwards
(Chile) Roberto Rojas	(Uruguay) Alfonso Dominguez (Uruguay) Nelson Gutiérrez (Paraguay) Rogelio Delgado (Ecuador) Luis Capurro	(Peru) Javier Chirinos (Argentina) Sergio Batista (Colombia) Carlos Valderrama (Argentina) Diego Maradona	(Uruguay) Antonio Alzamendi (Brazil) Careca
