= 1986 FIFA World Cup Group E =

Football tournament group stage

Group E of the 1986 FIFA World Cup was one of the groups of nations competing at the 1986 FIFA World Cup. The group's first round of matches began on 4 June and its last matches were played on 13 June. Matches were played at the Estadio La Corregidora in Querétaro and at the Estadio Neza 86 in Nezahualcóyotl. Impressive debutantes Denmark topped the group - surprisingly beating Germany 2-0 despite having a man sent off: they were joined in the second round by West Germany who would go on to reach the final. 3 red cards were handed out in this group, 2 of them against Uruguay who made the second round but were criticized for their physical play, especially in their last group game against Scotland where José Batista was sent off in under a minute. Scotland Manager Sir Alex Ferguson made the surprise decision to leave out captain Souness and passed responsibility on to Strachan and Albiston, a move with which Ferguson would later recall "his biggest mistake in football" despite being a man up, Scotland was unable to score, the match finishing 0-0, and Uruguay went through in third place instead.

Before the tournament, English-language media reported Uruguay manager Omar Borrás's description of it as the "group of death", popularising a phrase first used in Spanish in the 1970 World Cup.

== Standings ==
Pos	Team	Pld	W	D	L	GF	GA	GD	Pts	Qualification
1	Denmark	3	3	0	0	9	1	+8	6	Advance to knockout stage
2	West Germany	3	1	1	1	3	4	−1	3	Advance to knockout stage
3	Uruguay	3	0	2	1	2	7	−5	2	Advance to knockout stage
4	Scotland	3	0	1	2	1	3	−2	1	

Source: FIFA

== Matches ==
=== Uruguay vs West Germany ===
4 June 1986
12:00 CST

Uruguay	1–1	West Germany
Alzamendi 4'		Allofs 84'

Estadio La Corregidora, Querétaro
Attendance: 30,500
Referee: Vojtěch Christov (Czechoslovakia)

Uruguay	West Germany

GK	12	Fernando Álvez
DF	2	Nelson Gutiérrez
DF	3	Eduardo Acevedo
DF	4	Víctor Diogo	(yellow card) 28'
DF	6	José Batista
MF	5	Miguel Bossio
MF	8	Jorge Barrios (c)		(substituted off) 56'
MF	11	Sergio Santín
MF	10	Enzo Francescoli
FW	9	Jorge da Silva
FW	7	Antonio Alzamendi		(substituted off) 80'
Substitutions:
MF	16	Mario Saralegui	(yellow card) 62'	(substituted on) 56'
FW	19	Venancio Ramos		(substituted on) 80'
Manager:
(Uruguay) Omar Borrás

GK	1	Harald Schumacher (c)
DF	2	Hans-Peter Briegel
DF	4	Karlheinz Förster
DF	6	Norbert Eder
DF	14	Thomas Berthold
DF	15	Klaus Augenthaler
DF	3	Andreas Brehme	(substituted off) 46'
MF	10	Felix Magath
MF	8	Lothar Matthäus	(substituted off) 75'
FW	19	Klaus Allofs
FW	9	Rudi Völler
Substitutions:
MF	7	Pierre Littbarski	(substituted on) 46'
FW	11	Karl-Heinz Rummenigge	(substituted on) 75'
Manager:
(Germany) Franz Beckenbauer

=== Scotland vs Denmark ===
4 June 1986
16:00 CST

Scotland	0–1	Denmark
		Elkjær 57'

Estadio Neza 86, Nezahualcóyotl
Attendance: 18,000
Referee: Lajos Németh (Hungary)

Scotland	Denmark

GK	1	Jim Leighton
DF	2	Richard Gough
DF	5	Alex McLeish
DF	6	Willie Miller
DF	3	Maurice Malpas
MF	7	Gordon Strachan	(substituted off) 74'
MF	8	Roy Aitken
MF	4	Graeme Souness (c)
MF	13	Steve Nicol
FW	19	Charlie Nicholas
FW	20	Paul Sturrock	(substituted off) 61'
Substitutions:
GK	12	Andy Goram
FW	9	Eamonn Bannon	(substituted on) 74'
MF	11	Paul McStay
DF	14	David Narey
FW	16	Frank McAvennie	(substituted on) 61'
Manager:
(Scotland) Alex Ferguson

GK	1	Troels Rasmussen
SW	4	Morten Olsen (c)
DF	3	Søren Busk
DF	5	Ivan Nielsen
RWB	9	Klaus Berggreen	(yellow card) 84'
DM	12	Jens Jørn Bertelsen
CM	15	Frank Arnesen		(substituted off) 74'
CM	6	Søren Lerby
LWB	8	Jesper Olsen		(substituted off) 80'
FW	11	Michael Laudrup
FW	10	Preben Elkjær
Substitutions:
GK	16	Ole Qvist
DF	2	John Sivebæk		(substituted on) 74'
MF	7	Jan Mølby		(substituted on) 80'
FW	19	John Eriksen
MF	20	Jan Bartram
Manager:
(Germany) Sepp Piontek

=== West Germany vs Scotland ===
8 June 1986
12:00 CST

West Germany	2–1	Scotland
Völler 23'; Allofs 49'		Strachan 18'

Estadio La Corregidora, Querétaro
Attendance: 30,000
Referee: Ioan Igna (Romania)

West Germany	Scotland

GK	1	Harald Schumacher (c)
DF	2	Hans-Peter Briegel	(substituted off) 63'
DF	4	Karlheinz Förster
DF	6	Norbert Eder
DF	14	Thomas Berthold
DF	15	Klaus Augenthaler
MF	10	Felix Magath
MF	8	Lothar Matthäus
MF	7	Pierre Littbarski	(substituted off) 75'
FW	19	Klaus Allofs
FW	9	Rudi Völler
Substitutions:
DF	17	Ditmar Jakobs	(substituted on) 63'
FW	11	Karl-Heinz Rummenigge	(substituted on) 75'
Manager:
(Germany) Franz Beckenbauer

GK	1	Jim Leighton
DF	2	Richard Gough
DF	6	Willie Miller
DF	14	Dave Narey
DF	3	Maurice Malpas	(yellow card) 74'
MF	9	Eamonn Bannon	(yellow card) 44'	(substituted off) 74'
MF	8	Roy Aitken
MF	7	Gordon Strachan
MF	4	Graeme Souness (c)
MF	13	Steve Nicol		(substituted off) 61'
FW	17	Steve Archibald	(yellow card) 30'
Substitutions:
GK	12	Andy Goram
MF	10	Jim Bett
MF	11	Paul McStay
MF	16	Frank McAvennie		(substituted on) 61'
MF	21	Davie Cooper		(substituted on) 74'
Manager:
(Scotland) Alex Ferguson

=== Denmark vs Uruguay ===
8 June 1986
16:00 CST

Denmark	6–1	Uruguay
Elkjær 11', 67', 80'; Lerby 41'; Laudrup 52'; J. Olsen 88'		Francescoli 45' (pen.)

Estadio Neza 86, Nezahualcóyotl
Attendance: 26,500
Referee: Antonio Márquez Ramírez (Mexico)

Denmark	Uruguay

GK	1	Troels Rasmussen
SW	4	Morten Olsen (c)
DF	3	Søren Busk
DF	5	Ivan Nielsen	(yellow card) 7'
RWB	9	Klaus Berggreen
DM	12	Jens Jørn Bertelsen		(substituted off) 57'
CM	15	Frank Arnesen
CM	6	Søren Lerby
LWB	21	Henrik Andersen
FW	11	Michael Laudrup		(substituted off) 81'
FW	10	Preben Elkjær
Substitutions:
GK	22	Lars Høgh
DF	2	John Sivebæk
MF	7	Jan Mølby		(substituted on) 57'
MF	8	Jesper Olsen		(substituted on) 81'
FW	19	John Eriksen
Manager:
(Germany) Sepp Piontek

GK	12	Fernando Álvez
DF	2	Nelson Gutiérrez
DF	3	Eduardo Acevedo (c)
DF	4	Víctor Diogo
DF	6	José Batista
MF	5	Miguel Bossio	(yellow card) 13' (yellow-red card) 19'
MF	16	Mario Saralegui
MF	11	Sergio Santín		(substituted off) 57'
MF	10	Enzo Francescoli
FW	9	Jorge da Silva	(yellow card) 35'
FW	7	Antonio Alzamendi		(substituted off) 57'
Substitutions:
GK	22	Celso Otero
DF	14	Darío Pereyra
MF	17	José Zalazar		(substituted on) 57'
FW	19	Venancio Ramos		(substituted on) 57'
FW	21	Wilmar Cabrera
Manager:
(Uruguay) Omar Borrás

=== Denmark vs West Germany ===
13 June 1986
12:00 CST

Denmark	2–0	West Germany
J. Olsen 43' (pen.); Eriksen 62'

Estadio La Corregidora, Querétaro
Attendance: 36,000
Referee: Alexis Ponnet (Belgium)

Denmark	West Germany

GK	22	Lars Høgh
SW	4	Morten Olsen (c)
DF	3	Søren Busk
DF	21	Henrik Andersen
RWB	15	Frank Arnesen	(yellow card) 36' (red card) 88'
DM	2	John Sivebæk
CM	7	Jan Mølby
CM	6	Søren Lerby
LWB	8	Jesper Olsen		(substituted off) 71'
FW	11	Michael Laudrup
FW	10	Preben Elkjær		(substituted off) 46'
Substitutions:
FW	19	John Eriksen		(substituted on) 46'
FW	14	Allan Simonsen		(substituted on) 71'
Manager:
(Germany) Sepp Piontek

GK	1	Harald Schumacher (c)
DF	4	Karlheinz Förster		(substituted off) 71'
DF	5	Matthias Herget
DF	6	Norbert Eder	(yellow card) 48'
DF	14	Thomas Berthold
DF	17	Ditmar Jakobs	(yellow card) 51'
DF	3	Andreas Brehme
MF	21	Wolfgang Rolff		(substituted off) 46'
MF	8	Lothar Matthäus
FW	19	Klaus Allofs
FW	9	Rudi Völler
Substitutions:
MF	7	Pierre Littbarski		(substituted on) 46'
FW	11	Karl-Heinz Rummenigge		(substituted on) 71'
Manager:
(Germany) Franz Beckenbauer

=== Scotland vs Uruguay ===
13 June 1986
12:00 CST

Scotland	0–0	Uruguay

Estadio Neza 86, Nezahualcóyotl
Attendance: 20,000
Referee: Joël Quiniou (France)

Scotland	Uruguay

GK	1	Jim Leighton
DF	2	Richard Gough
DF	6	Willie Miller (c)
DF	14	David Narey	(yellow card) 48'
DF	15	Arthur Albiston
MF	7	Gordon Strachan
MF	8	Roy Aitken
MF	11	Paul McStay
MF	13	Steve Nicol	(yellow card) 62'	(substituted off) 70'
FW	18	Graeme Sharp
FW	20	Paul Sturrock		(substituted off) 70'
Substitutions:
GK	12	Andy Goram
MF	10	Jim Bett
FW	17	Steve Archibald
FW	19	Charlie Nicholas		(substituted on) 70'
MF	21	Davie Cooper		(substituted on) 70'
Manager:
(Scotland) Alex Ferguson

GK	12	Fernando Álvez	(yellow card) 87'
DF	2	Nelson Gutiérrez
DF	3	Eduardo Acevedo
DF	4	Víctor Diogo	(yellow card) 72'
DF	6	José Batista	(red card) 1'
DF	14	Darío Pereyra
MF	8	Jorge Barrios (c)
MF	11	Sergio Santín
MF	10	Enzo Francescoli		(substituted off) 84'
FW	21	Wilmar Cabrera	(yellow card) 32'
FW	19	Venancio Ramos		(substituted off) 70'
Substitutions:
GK	1	Rodolfo Rodríguez
FW	7	Antonio Alzamendi		(substituted on) 84'
FW	9	Jorge da Silva
DF	13	César Vega
MF	16	Mario Saralegui		(substituted on) 70'
Manager:
(Uruguay) Omar Borrás

== See also ==
- Denmark at the FIFA World Cup
- Germany at the FIFA World Cup
- Scotland at the FIFA World Cup
- Uruguay at the FIFA World Cup
