= Sergio Santín =

Uruguayan footballer (born 1956)

Personal information
- Full name: Sergio Rodolfo Santín Spinelli
- Date of birth: 6 August 1956 (age 70)
- Place of birth: Salto, Uruguay
- Height: 1.78 m (5 ft 10 in)
- Position: Midfielder

Senior career*
Years	Team	Apps	(Gls)
1975–1979	Danubio		
1980	Deportivo Pereira		
1981	Cúcuta Deportivo		
1981–1982	Deportivo Pereira	119	(29)
1983–1984	Atlético Nacional		
1984–1985	Peñarol		
1985–1986	Atlético Nacional	158	(45)
1986	Santos	14	(0)
1987–1990	América de Cali	72	(16)
1990	Cristal Caldas		
1991–1992	Once Philips		

International career
1980–1986	Uruguay	18	(0)

Managerial career
- 1991: Once Philips (player/manager)
- 1992: Once Philips (interim)
- 1994–1995: Cúcuta Deportivo
- 1996–1997: Atlético Nacional (youth)
- 2005: América de Cali (assistant)
- 2006: Santa Fe (assistant)
- 2007: Talleres (assistant)
- 2007–2008: Universitario (assistant)
- 2009–2013: Vélez Sarsfield (assistant)
- 2014: Palmeiras (assistant)
- 2015–2022: Peru (assistant)
- 2023: Vélez Sarsfield (assistant)
- 2024–2025: Chile (assistant)
Medal record
Representing Uruguay
Copa América
Winner	1983
CONMEBOL–UEFA Cup of Champions
Runner-up	1985 France
- * Club domestic league appearances and goals

Sergio Rodolfo Santín Spinelli (born August 6, 1956, in Salto) is a retired football striker from Uruguay, who was nicknamed "Bocha" during his professional career.

== Playing career ==
Having made his official debut on July 18, 1980, against Peru (2-2), Santín obtained a total number of 18 international caps for the Uruguay national football team. He represented his native country at the 1986 FIFA World Cup, wearing the number eleven jersey.

Santín played club football for Danubio and Peñarol in Uruguay and Cúcuta Deportivo, Atletico Nacional, and América de Cali in Colombia.

== Coaching career ==
Following his retirement, Santín became the manager of Once Caldas, then called Once Philips, and later led Cúcuta Deportivo.

Since 2005, he has worked as Ricardo Gareca's assistant coach in both clubs and national teams. In 2024–25, he performed as assistant coach for the Chile national team.
