= Fernando Álvez =

Uruguayan footballer (born 1959)

Personal information
- Full name: Fernando Harry Álvez Mosquera
- Date of birth: September 4, 1959 (age 67)
- Place of birth: Montevideo, Uruguay
- Height: 1.84 m (6 ft 1/2 in)
- Position: Goalkeeper

Senior career*
Years	Team	Apps	(Gls)
1976–1977	Defensor Sporting		
1978–1984	Peñarol		
1984	Libertad		
1985–1986	Peñarol	177	(0)
1987–1988	Botafogo	18	(0)
1988–1991	Peñarol	34	(0)
1991	Independiente Medellín	10	(0)
1991–1993	Deportivo Mandiyú	35	(0)
1994	Junior de Barranquilla		
1995	River Plate MVD	1	(0)
1995–1996	San Lorenzo		
1997	Peñarol		

International career
1980–1997	Uruguay	40	(0)
Medal record
Representing Uruguay
Copa América
Winner	1995 Uruguay
Mundialito
Winner	1980 Uruguay
CONMEBOL–UEFA Cup of Champions
Runner-up	1985 France
- * Club domestic league appearances and goals

Fernando Harry Álvez Mosquera (born September 4, 1959 in Montevideo) is a Uruguayan former footballer who played as a goalkeeper for the Uruguay national team and several clubs in Uruguay, Paraguay, Colombia, Brazil and Argentina.

Álvez obtained 40 caps for the Uruguay national team. Having made his debut on July 18, 1980 in a friendly against Peru (0-0), Álvez was a member of the 1986 and 1990 FIFA World Cup teams.
