= Lajos Németh =

Hungarian football referee (1944–2014)

- Born: 14 August 1944; Gyomaendrőd, Hungary
- Died: 26 January 2014 (aged 69); Hungary

Domestic
Years	League	Role
1981–1993	Nemzeti Bajnokság I	Referee

International
Years	League	Role
1983–1991	FIFA listed	Referee

Lajos Németh (14 August 1944 – 26 January 2014) was a Hungarian football referee and former footballer who was on the FIFA International Referees List between 1983 and 1991.

== Career ==
Németh was born in 1944 in Gyomaendrőd, Hungary, and began his career as a footballer in 1962. He first played for Kispest Honvéd FC and Békéscsaba 1912 Előre in the 1960s. At the age of 34, Németh retired as a footballer and became involved with refereeing, ascending to the Nemzeti Bajnokság I in 1981. Two years later, he attained the FIFA international badge and refereed matches at UEFA and intercontinental tournaments.

He was appointed to the 1986 FIFA World Cup in Mexico, where he oversaw a single group stage game between Scotland and Denmark for Group E at Estadio Neza 86 in Ciudad Nezahualcóyotl.

Németh was active at the UEFA Cup Winners' Cup, refereeing the so-called Miracle of Grotenburg match on 19 March 1986 in Krefeld. The game was a second-leg quarter-final and was played between KFC Uerdingen 05 and Dynamo Dresden, finishing in a 7–3 victory for the formers. In April 1989, Németh oversaw another high-stakes match between German teams in a semifinal of the 1988–89 UEFA Cup between VfB Stuttgart and Dynamo Dresden in the then Neckarstadion in Stuttgart.

In 1991, Németh retired from FIFA refereeing and oversaw his last match in Hungary on 9 June 1993 in a game between Vasas SC and BFC Siófok.

He died on 26 January 2014 at the age of 69.
