= Estadio Corregidora =

Football stadium in Querétaro, Mexico

Coordinates: 20°34′40″N 100°21′59″W

- El Coloso del Cimatario "The Colossus of the Summit"
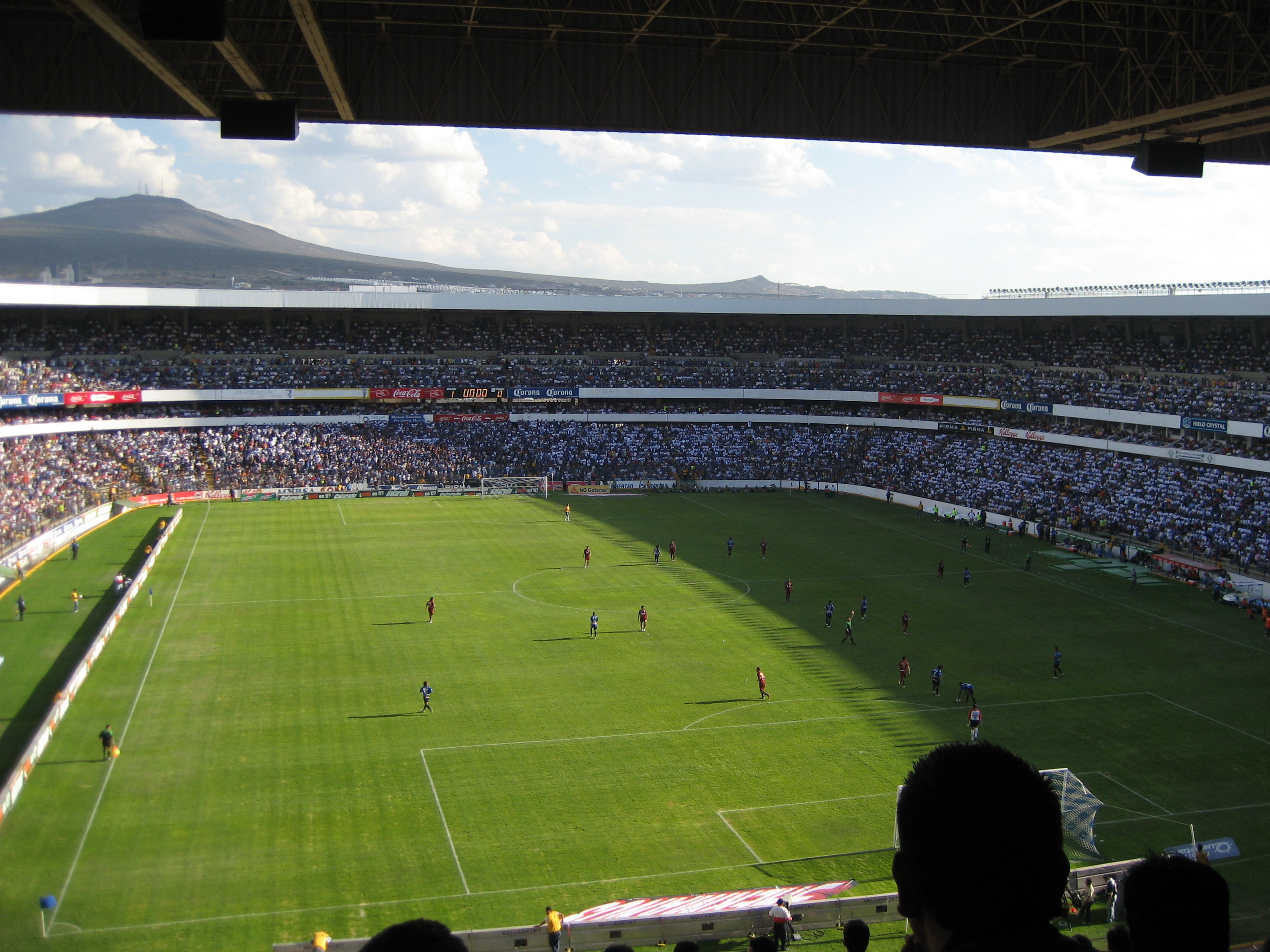
- Interactive map of Estadio Corregidora
- Location: Avenida Luis Vega Monroy 409-4, Querétaro, Mexico
- Capacity: 34,130
- Surface: Grass
- Field size: 105 × 70 m

Construction
- Built: 1984
- Opened: 5 February 1985
- Architect: Luis Alfonso Fernandez

Tenants
- Querétaro (1985–present); Cobras (1986–1987); Atlante (1989–1990); Tampico Madero (1994–1995); Universidad Nacional (1999–2000); Mexico national football team (selected matches)

Estadio Corregidora is a stadium in Querétaro City, Mexico. It is named after Mexican War of Independence heroine Josefa Ortiz de Domínguez ("La Corregidora") and has a capacity of 34,130. The venue is used mostly for football games as the home of Querétaro FC. It is also used for concerts.

Built in 1985 in a collaboration between Mexican and European partners, Estadio Corregidora served as a venue for several games in the 1986 FIFA World Cup.

== International Competition ==
- 1986 FIFA World Cup
- 2011 FIFA U-17 World Cup

== 1986 FIFA World Cup ==
Date	Time	Team #1	Res.	Team #2	Round	Attendance
4 June 1986	12:00	Uruguay	1–1	West Germany	Group E	30,500
8 June 1986	12:00	West Germany	2–1	Scotland	Group E	30,000
13 June 1986	12:00	Denmark	2–0	West Germany	Group E	36,000
18 June 1986	16:00	Denmark	1–5	Spain	Round of 16	38,500

== 2022 Estadio Corregidora riots ==
On 5 March 2022, Liga MX club Querétaro FC hosted Atlas FC at La Corregidora for matchday 9 of the Clausura 2022 tournament. At the 63rd minute, fighting between fans of both teams broke out in the stadium's stands. The match was stopped immediately, and the teams' players returned to their respective dressing rooms. The sparse security elements in the stadium were unable to control the situation and opened the stadium's exits to allow spectators to escape the violence, which had spread to the pitch.

Due to the developing events at the stadium, the match was suspended by its head referee, with the score at Querétaro 0 - 1 Atlas. Liga MX president Mikel Arriola stated that "those responsible for the lack of security in the stadium will be punished in an exemplary manner." The league announced that the remainder of the match's second half would be played at a future date.

On 8 March 2022, Liga MX authorities announced a one year veto for the stadium.

== See also ==
- List of football stadiums in Mexico
