= Group of death =

Unusually competitive group in a multi-stage sports tournament

A group of death in a multi-stage tournament is a group which is unusually competitive, because the number of strong competitors in the group is greater than the number of qualifying places available for the next phase of the tournament. Thus, in the group phase, one or more strong competitors in the "group of death" will necessarily be eliminated, who would otherwise have been expected to progress further in the tournament. The informal term was first used for groups in the FIFA World Cup finals. It is now also used in other association football tournaments and other sports.

After the draw for a tournament has been made, debates often arise about which of the preliminary groups is "the" group of death. This happens for multiple reasons: in part, from more general debates about the relative strengths of the various competitors; but, additionally, because there is no exact definition of the term "group of death". Sometimes, the term simply signifies a group with only the strongest competitors, all of which are potential winners of the tournament, implying there is always precisely one such group; other definitions allow for multiple groups of death or for none at all.

The term is sometimes derided as a purely journalistic invention, a cliché, or an oversimplification based entirely on the unsportsmanlike notion that outcomes of such sports tournaments are largely predictable and that there are always underdogs, dark horses and top dogs.

== Origin ==
The term "Group of Death" was selected (as Spanish: grupo de la muerte) by English journalists for Group 3 of the 1970 FIFA World Cup. This featured reigning champions England, favourites and eventual champions Brazil, 1962 runners-up Czechoslovakia, and Romania.

It was used again for the second-phase Group C in the 1982 World Cup in Spain. This grouped defending champions Argentina, the eventual champions Italy and Brazil. In 2007, The Guardian called this the deadliest-ever Group of Death.

It was popularised after the draw for the 1986 World Cup, when Uruguay manager Omar Borrás so described Group E, which included Uruguay, West Germany, Denmark, and Scotland. As with the 1970 group, this was the only one with all four teams from Europe and South America. The label was widely repeated by the English-language media. By the 1986 tournament rules, two or three of the four teams in each group would progress to the knockout phase; in the event, Scotland was the only team not to qualify from the prototypical "group of death". Uruguay were criticised for persistent foul play in the decisive match with Scotland; Borrás was suspended for retorting, "The Group of Death? Yes, there was a murderer on the field today. The referee."

== Seedings ==
Tournaments are often seeded to provide an even distribution of strong and weak competitors across all preliminary groups. However, in association football, the ranking methods used for seeding may be crude. In the World Cup, until 2018 the usual strategy was for each group to contain one seeded team and three unseeded teams, with the unseeded teams picked from separate regional confederations. Some North American, African and Asian teams are significantly stronger than others. The net result was that some groups may have had stronger teams than others. From the 2018 edition onwards this system has been changed, with a distribution of teams based on the FIFA World Rankings introduced, but with continental limitations still to be retained.

The reigning champion and the host nation or nations are traditionally among the seeds. In the case of UEFA Euro 2008, this meant three of the four seeds were among the weakest teams in the tournament: hosts Austria and Switzerland, and surprise 2004 champions Greece. 2006 World Cup finalists France and Italy were unseeded and ended up in Group C with Netherlands and Romania. This was considered a "group of death" with Romania as underdogs against three of Europe's top sides.

Even in competitions that give no seeding advantage to hosts or defending champions, "group of death" scenarios can still emerge. For example, the draw for the pools of the Rugby World Cup (union) primarily uses teams' positions in the World Rugby Rankings to determine placement in the "pots" for the draw. However, the draw has traditionally been held nearly three years before the competition. For example, the pool draw for the 2015 Rugby World Cup was held in December 2012. This led to the host team, England, being drawn into a pool that included traditional powers Australia and Wales, with only two teams able to advance to the knockout stage. Because Wales had gone winless in their November 2012 Tests, they had dropped to ninth in the rankings at the time of the draw. Australia were third and England fifth at the time, placing all three teams into separate pots. In August 2015, World Rugby CEO Brett Gosper told the Press Association that the body was seriously considering rescheduling the draw for future World Cups to be much closer in time to the competition. However, this change could not be implemented for the 2019 Rugby World Cup mainly because of the potential for ticketing clashes with the 2020 Summer Olympics, since Japan was to host both events.

== Debates and definitions ==
In the FIFA World Cup tournament proper, the UEFA European Championship and the UEFA Champions League, each preliminary group has four teams, two of which qualify for the knockout phase. Some sources imply all four teams must be in contention for a "group of death"; others allow for three teams fighting for two places, with one underdog making up the numbers. In the latter case, the term gains an additional facet from the expected "death" of the weak team: the Glasgow Herald described Euro 1992 Group B as the "Group of Certain Death" because Scotland were grouped with the Netherlands, Germany, and the CIS. More extreme still, Ian Paul suggested semi-final Group B of the 1992–93 UEFA Champions League was a "group of death" for all but one team, AC Milan, who were almost sure to top the group and reach the final. Milan ultimately won all six matches against IFK Göteborg, Porto, and PSV.

In the case of UEFA qualifying tournaments, groups have deeper seeding and always feature some weaker teams. For example, Qualifying Group B for Euro 2008 was dubbed the "group of death" in Scotland because Scotland were drawn against Italy, France, and Ukraine, respectively champion, finalist, and quarter-finalist at the 2006 World Cup. The presence in the group of Lithuania, Georgia, and the Faroe Islands did not contribute to the label.

It is often assumed that a tournament has precisely one Group of Death. In the 1994 World Cup, Group E (Italy, the Republic of Ireland, Mexico and Norway) was often given the label; Brazil head coach Carlos Alberto Parreira said it was Group B (Brazil, Russia, Cameroon and Sweden); some reporters suggested both were "groups of death".

On the other hand, after the draw for the 2010 World Cup finals, some commentators said there was no group of death. Sports Illustrated said Group G was the group of death because it had two of the top five nations in the FIFA World Rankings, Brazil and Portugal, as well as the second-ranked African team, Ivory Coast; it described fourth team North Korea as "unenviable underdog". On the other hand, Andrew Downie of the Christian Science Monitor said, "No self-respecting Group of Death would be caught dead with North Korea in it... As far as I'm concerned, there is no Group of Death in this World Cup." Spain manager Vicente del Bosque said of 2014 World Cup Group B, "We have to define it as complicated but I don't believe this is the Group of Death. There are others very hard. But our group is difficult."

The "Group of Death" may simply be the one with the highest average team ranking overall. Using FIFA World Rankings as a measure of the strength of the teams, The Guardian calculated in 2007 that the strongest "Group of Death" was Euro 1996 Group C. The teams (and world rankings) were Germany (2), Russia (3), Italy (7) and the Czech Republic (10). This record was exceeded by the May 2012 rankings for Euro 2012 Group B, with Germany (2), the Netherlands (4), Portugal (5) and Denmark (10), but not the June rankings immediately before the tournament (3, 4, 10 and 9 respectively). In women's football, 2007 World Cup Group B featured three of the top five teams in the FIFA Women's World Rankings entering the tournament – the United States (1), Sweden (3) and North Korea (5) – with Nigeria (24) being the "minnows".

There may be an emphasis on the "group of death" having a tight finish, with all four teams in contention. This was the case in Group F of the 1990 World Cup, in which five of the six matches were drawn, and in Group E of the 1994 World Cup, when all four teams finished level on points and goal difference.

However, the label is usually applied in anticipation of the tournament rather than in retrospect. Simon Burnton comments, "Inevitably, one of the big teams involved gets so scared about being in the Group of Death that they play really badly, meaning not only that they go home in disappointment and disgrace, but that the group turns out not to be so very troublesome after all.". David Lacey said, "Draws may nominate a group of death but results decide its real mortality rating. France and Argentina found this out in Japan." Lacey also said, "There are groups of death and groups of death wishes. In Euro 2000 Group D looked daunting but was shrugged aside by the Netherlands, the co-hosts, and France, the eventual champions, with the Czechs, runners-up in 1996, and the Danes, winners in 1992, offering scant resistance. Group A turned out to be the killer."

Lack of consensus about on the definition has historically fueled debates among fans and journalists. In the 2002 World Cup, The Guardian called Group F (Sweden, England, Argentina and Nigeria) "the group of death" and Group E (Germany, the Republic of Ireland, Cameroon and Saudi Arabia) "the other Group of Death". South Koreans called Group D (South Korea, United States, Portugal and Poland) the "Real Group of Death". In the 2006 World Cup, both Group C (Argentina, the Netherlands, Ivory Coast and Serbia and Montenegro) and Group E (Italy, Ghana, Czech Republic and the United States) were nominated as "group of death". In the 2014 World Cup, three groups were acknowledged in the media as "group of death": Group B (Spain, the Netherlands, Chile, Australia), Group D (Uruguay, Costa Rica, England and Italy), and Group G (Germany, Portugal, Ghana and the United States); Group G was considered especially difficult in the U.S., as they had been eliminated by its "weakest" team, Ghana, in each of the past two tournaments. In the 2018 World Cup, there were three groups that were considered groups of death: Group E (Brazil, Costa Rica, Serbia and Switzerland), Group F (reigning champions Germany, Mexico, South Korea and Sweden) and Group D (Argentina, Croatia, Nigeria and Iceland). In UEFA Euro 2020, Group F – the only group with three top-fifteen teams in the FIFA World Rankings as of the draw date: #2 France, #7 Portugal and #15 Germany, along with #52 Hungary – was considered the group of death. Despite France, Germany, and Portugal all progressing, Group F was the only group not to contain any teams in the quarterfinals, with Portugal losing 1–0 to Belgium, France losing to Switzerland on penalties after a 3–3 draw, and Germany losing 2–0 to England. In the UEFA Euro 2024, its Group B was dubbed as the Group of Death as it contains the bottom of the top 10 of the FIFA Rankings as of the draw date— #8 Spain, #9 Croatia, and #10 Italy, who were also the defending champions of the tournament. They were joined by #66 Albania. Following the draw for the 2026 FIFA World Cup, some argued that there was no real group of death in that year's competition and that expansion of the competition had killed off the concept.

The UEFA Champions League has had its fair share of groups of death: highlights include Group D in the 2012-13 edition (Real Madrid, Manchester City, Ajax Amsterdam, Borussia Dortmund), Group H in the 2017–18 edition (Real Madrid, Tottenham Hotspur, Borussia Dortmund and APOEL), Group C in the 2018–19 edition (Paris Saint-Germain, Liverpool, Napoli and Red Star Belgrade), Group F in the 2019–20 edition (SK Slavia Prague, Inter Milan, Borussia Dortmund, and FC Barcelona), Group C in the 2022–23 edition (Bayern Munich, FC Barcelona, Inter Milan and Viktoria Plzeň) and Group F in the 2023–24 edition (Paris Saint-Germain, Borussia Dortmund, AC Milan and Newcastle United).

In the 1998–99 UEFA Champions League group stage there were six groups which all contained four teams, but only the group winners and the two second-placed teams with the best records would qualify for the next round. In that season, Group C (Holders Real Madrid, 1998 UEFA Cup Winners Internazionale, 1998 UEFA Cup semi-finalists Spartak Moscow and comparative minoows Sturm Graz) and Group D (Spanish champions Barcelona, former Champions Cup winners Bayern Munich and Manchester United as well as relative minnows Brøndby) could well be considered groups of death. In the event, those groups were the two whose second-placed teams would go on to have the best records among second-placed teams, and the top two teams of Group D, Bayern Munich and Manchester United, would go on to contest the final.

The label may be entirely subjective and applied to one's favorite team. George Vecsey has stated that "In soccer, every nation always thinks it has been stiffed into the toughest pool, the Group of Death." In this sense, David Warren comments that a "top seeding in a finals group gives a country a good chance to advance and the best chance to avoid a so-called group of death".

== Other sports ==
The label "group of death" has been used in other sports than association football; for example:

Badminton
2021 Sudirman Cup Group A (where China, India and Thailand are placed in the same group)
2023 Sudirman Cup Group C (where India, Chinese Taipei and Malaysia are placed in the same group)
2024 Summer Olympics Men's Doubles Group D (where the reigning champions Lee Yang & Wang Chi-lin, previous silver medallist Liu Yuchen, 2021 World Champions Takuro Hoki & Yugo Kobayashi, and second seeds Kim Astrup & Anders Skaarup Rasmussen were placed in the same group)
Baseball
2023 World Baseball Classic Pool A (where all teams went 2W2L), 2023 World Baseball Classic Pool D
Basketball
1994 FIBA World Championship Group A; 2010 NCAA Men's Midwest Regional; 2014 NCAA Men's Midwest Regional (where undefeated Wichita State was pitted in an early round against a young, talented Kentucky team playing far better than their ranking would suggest, and in a bracket which also included powerhouses Michigan, Duke and Louisville); 2016 NCAA Men's East Regional; 2019 FIBA World Cup Group H and 2024 Summer Olympics Group A
Cricket
2008 Twenty20 Cup North Division; 2009 World Twenty20 Group C;, 2012 World Twenty20 Super8 - Group 2;2021 T20 World Cup Super 12 - Group 1
Darts
2024 Grand Slam of Darts Group H, 2025 Grand Slam of Darts Group G
Esports
2016 CS:GO Cologne Major Group D, 2019 LoL Worlds Group C, 2022 LoL Worlds Group A.
Ice hockey
2010 Olympic men's qualifying group G.
Paralympic association football
2012 Summer Paralympics 7-a-side Group B; 2016 Summer Paralympics 7-a-side Group A; 2016 Summer Paralympics 5-a-side Group B
Rugby league
1995 World Cup Group 3; 2008 World Cup Group A (the 2008 group was deliberately constructed by putting the top four seeds in one group, with three to qualify, to ensure more competitive matches in the first phase, and guarantee weaker sides a semi-final place)
Rugby union
Rugby World Cup: 1995 World Cup Pool B; 2003 World Cup Group A; 2007 World Cup Pool D; 2015 Rugby World Cup Pool A (where Australia, hosts England and Wales were placed in the same group, being second, third and fourth respectively in the World Rugby rankings as of 21 September 2015); 2019 Rugby World Cup Pool C; 2023 Rugby World Cup Pool B (which contained the teams ranked 1st, 2nd and 5th in the world at the time).
Heineken Cup: 2001–02 Heineken Cup Pool 6; 2011-12 Heineken Cup Pool 3 (Glasgow Warriors were drawn against reigning champions Leinster, a young Bath side and the best of the lowest-seeded teams Montpellier).

== Variants ==
=== Variant definitions ===
"Group of death" has occasionally been used to characterise a qualifying group in some other way. The southern section preliminary round Group 5 of the 1990-91 Leyland DAF Cup had lowly teams replaying poorly-attended matches; after many postponements, Robert Pryce commented: "The Leyland Daf Cup Southern Section preliminary round's Group of Death has achieved almost total rigor mortis."

Scotland manager Andy Roxburgh described Euro 1992 qualifying Group 2 as a "group of death" in a different sense because of the lack of a glamorous opponent "to get people out of the house and into Hampden Park." The group combined Bulgaria, Romania, San Marino, Scotland, and Switzerland.

The Asian final qualifying group for the 1994 World Cup featured two sets of militantly hostile neighbours: Iran, Iraq, and Saudi Arabia; and North Korea, South Korea, and Japan. This was called the "group of death" for black humour.

A similar quip was made of the UEFA qualifying group 1 for the 1998 World Cup:

The toughest group in the World Cup qualifying competition is the Group of Death. For the 1998 qualifiers, group one takes the title with ease. Bosnia, Croatia and Slovenia were drawn in group one. . . . There was, mercifully, no Serb-dominated rump Yugoslavia drawn in the same group. But there was, as far as the others are concerned, the next worse thing: the Greeks. They share the Orthodox religion with the Serbs, and give them strong diplomatic support. Pity Denmark, the reigning European champions, who make up the group.

=== Related terms ===
Occasionally, alternatives to "group of death" are proffered. Javier Clemente said of 1998 World Cup Group D, "This is not the group of death, as some people have said. It is the group of heart attacks" John Harrell said of 1994 World Cup Group E, "The characterization might be a bit harsh. Perhaps the 'Group of Surprises' is a better term."

Sometimes the excitement of a close contest between high-quality teams has suggested the positive "group of life" is more appropriate than "group of death". Of 2002 World Cup Group F, Paul Wilson said, "England's group is not so much the group of death as the group of life, for few others promise any drama" Of 2006 World Cup Group C, Gary Lineker said after Argentina's demolition of Serbia and Montenegro, "Argentina produced one of the great performances in recent World Cup history. The group of death has become the group of life."

However, "Group of Life" has also been used as the opposite of "Group of Death", to mean an easy group with weak teams. Chuck Culpepper wrote of 2006 World Cup Group B, 'If each World Cup draw brings a "Group of Death," anointed for its incomparable rigour among the eight groups, England 2006 surely occupies the Group of Life, or the Group of Tranquillity, or the Group of So Few Worries We Spent All Day Yesterday Following the Metatarsal Melodrama Rather Than Worry About Trinidad and Tobago.' Radio Télévision Suisse said Switzerland was "far from being in a group of 'death'" when drawn in 2014 World Cup Group E. Polish-speaking media tend to refer to relatively tough and forgiving groups as grupa śmierci ("group of death") and grupa marzeń ("dream group") respectively.

1986 World Cup Group F, with two goals in the first four games combined, was dubbed the "Group of Sleep".

Before the UEFA Euro 2012 tournament draw, financial writer Chris Sloley coined the term "Group of Debt" for a possible group comprising PIIGS indebted countries; in the event, three of these (Spain, Italy and the Republic of Ireland) were grouped together with Croatia in Group C, while Greece and Portugal were in other groups.

"Group of Champions" has been used in the UEFA Champions League both for groups where all teams are former champions of that competition, and for groups where all teams are reigning domestic champions.
