= John Eriksen =

Danish footballer (1957–2002)

Personal information
- Full name: John Hartmann Eriksen
- Date of birth: 20 November 1957
- Place of birth: Assens, Denmark
- Date of death: 12 February 2002 (aged 44)
- Place of death: Svendborg, Denmark
- Height: 1.80 m (5 ft 11 in)
- Position: Striker

Youth career
- 1964–1975: Svendborg fB

Senior career*
Years	Team	Apps	(Gls)
1975–1977	Svendborg fB		(23)
1978–1980	Odense Boldklub	60	(42)
1980–1984	Roda	144	(80)
1984–1985	Mulhouse	34	(27)
1985–1986	Feyenoord	31	(22)
1986–1989	Servette	87	(75)
1989–1991	Luzern	70	(37)
1991–1993	Svendborg fB	57	(39)
Total		479	(342)

International career
1975	Denmark U17	1	(1)
1975	Denmark U19	2	(0)
1978–1983	Denmark U21	15	(3)
1981–1988	Denmark	17	(6)
- * Club domestic league appearances and goals

John Hartmann Eriksen (20 November 1957 – 12 February 2002) was a Danish professional footballer who played as a striker. He scored 319 league goals over the course of 15 seasons. He played in four countries, namely his native Denmark, the Netherlands, France and Switzerland. Eriksen was a Danish international in the 1980s, appearing in the 1986 FIFA World Cup and UEFA Euro 1988.

== Early life ==
Eriksen was born on 20 November 1957 in Assens. In 1964 he moved with his family from Assens to Svendborg, where he and his brother started playing football in Svendborg fB. Here he won the Funen boy Championship in 1968. He debuted for the club in June 1975, aged 17.

== Club career ==
After two season with Svendborg, Eriksen switched to the largest club on Funen, OB, scoring 22 goals in each of his two seasons with the club. In January 1980, he moved to Roda in the Netherlands, never netting less than 16 goals in each of his four Eredivisie seasons.

In 1984–85, Eriksen joined Mulhouse in the French Ligue 2, finishing second in the goal scoring charts as the club narrowly missed on promotion, falling short in the playoffs. In the summer, he returned to the Netherlands and joined Feyenoord, again surpassing the 20-goal mark as the Rotterdam outfit ranked in third position.

Aged almost 29, Eriksen moved to Switzerland where he continued to display solid scoring form, for both Servette FC (having played alongside Karl-Heinz Rummenigge) and FC Luzern. With the former, he led the scorers list in his first two seasons, notably scoring 36 in 34 games in 1987–88 (second position overall, only two points behind champions Neuchâtel Xamax).

Eriksen ended his career at nearly 36 with his first club, hometown's Svendborg fB.

== International career ==
Eriksen won 17 caps and scored six goals for Denmark, his debut coming in 1981. He was selected for the squad that competed in the 1986 FIFA World Cup, appearing as a substitute against West Germany (2–0 win, one goal) and Spain (5–1 round-of-16 loss).

Eriksen was also picked for UEFA Euro 1988 in West Germany, playing twice in an eventual group stage exit (two 2–0 losses), starting against Italy.

== Death ==
After ending his career, Eriksen suffered Alzheimer's disease, and lived his last three years in a nursing home in Svendborg. After falling accidentally in his home, he died on 12 February 2002, at 44 years of age. He was buried in St. Nicolai Church in Svendborg on 20 February 2002.
