= Omar Borrás =

Uruguayan football manager (1929–2022)

Personal information
- Full name: Omar Bienvenido Borrás Branda
- Date of birth: 15 June 1929
- Place of birth: Montevideo, Uruguay
- Date of death: 19 October 2022 (aged 93)

Managerial career
- Years: Team
- Uruguay (assistant)
- Huracán Buceo
- Montevideo Wanderers
- Central Español
- 1977: Uruguay
- 1982–1987: Uruguay
- 1987–1988: Al Hilal
- 1988: Saudi Arabia

Omar Bienvenido Borrás Branda (15 June 1929 – 19 October 2022) was a Uruguayan football manager.

== Career ==
Borrás was assistant manager to Ondino Viera while Uruguay national team played the 1966 FIFA World Cup in England.

As manager of Montevideo Wanderers he achieved qualification to the 1975 Copa Libertadores.

He first managed the Uruguay in 1977 on an interim basis.

Borrás was appointed Uruguay national team manager for a second time in 1982. He guided Uruguay to their victory at the 1983 Copa América. He was also the coach of Uruguay at the 1986 FIFA World Cup. During that tournament, he was banned from the sidelines for their second round match against Argentina due to Uruguay's rough play for their previous game against Scotland, and also his remarks towards the referee after the match. When he left his post in 1986, he had managed 54 matches, the second most of all Uruguay managers behind Óscar Tabárez as of 2022.

It is believed that he was the first person to use the term the "Group of Death", to describe their first round group with West Germany, Denmark and Scotland.

== Death ==
Borrás died on 19 October 2022, aged 93, due to kidney problems.
