= Miguel Bossio =

Uruguayan footballer (born 1960)

Personal information
- Full name: Miguel Angel Bossio Bastianini
- Date of birth: 10 February 1960 (age 66)
- Place of birth: Montevideo, Uruguay
- Height: 1.83 m (6 ft 0 in)
- Position: Midfielder

Senior career*
Years	Team	Apps	(Gls)
1974–1977	Racing Montevideo		
1978–1979	Sud América	16	(0)
1980–1985	Peñarol	151	(3)
1986–1990	Valencia	96	(0)
1990–1992	Sabadell	32	(1)
1992–1993	Albacete	10	(0)

International career
1983–1986	Uruguay	30	(1)
Medal record
Representing Uruguay
Copa América
Winner	1983
CONMEBOL–UEFA Cup of Champions
Runner-up	1985 France
- * Club domestic league appearances and goals

Miguel Angel Bossio Bastianini (born February 10, 1960, in Montevideo) is a retired football midfielder from Uruguay, who obtained a total number of thirty international caps for his national team. Having made his international debut on October 27, 1983, against Brazil (2–0), he retired from international competition after the 1986 FIFA World Cup.

Bossio played club football for Racing Club de Montevideo, Sud América and Peñarol in Uruguay. In 1986, he joined Valencia in Spain and between 1989 and 1991 he played for Sabadell also in Spain.

He currently acts as a scout for Valencia.
