= Antonio Márquez Ramírez =

Mexican football referee (1936–2013)

- Full name: Antonio Márquez Ramírez
- Born: May 22, 1936; San Juan de los Lagos, Jalisco, Mexico
- Died: October 22, 2013 (aged 77); Mexico City

International
Years	League	Role
1986	FIFA-listed	Referee

Antonio Márquez Ramírez (May 22, 1936 – October 22, 2013) was a Mexican football referee, born in San Juan de los Lagos. He is known for having refereed two matches in the 1986 FIFA World Cup in Mexico. He retired shortly after the World Cup, his last match was between América v Chivas de Guadalajara at the Estadio Azteca which culminated in a big fight between the two teams.
