= Joël Quiniou =

French football referee (born 1950)

- Full name: Joël Quiniou
- Born: 11 July 1950 (age 76); Paris, France

Domestic
Years	League	Role
1979-1994	Division 1	Referee

International
Years	League	Role
1980-1994	FIFA-listed	Referee

Joël Quiniou (born 11 July 1950) is a French former football referee. He is best known for supervising eight matches in the FIFA World Cup, one in 1986, three in 1990 and four in 1994.

== Career ==
He supervised eight matches in the FIFA World Cup, one in 1986, three in 1990 and four in 1994. In the group stages of the 1986 World Cup, Quiniou sent off Uruguay's José Batista in the first minute of the match against Scotland, after a rough tackle on Gordon Strachan. As of 2023 this remains the fastest dismissal in World Cup history. Quiniou received criticism for his performance at the 1994 FIFA World Cup Semi-final between Bulgaria and Italy. Several penalty claims by the Bulgarians were turned down, most notably when Alessandro Costacurta handled the ball inside the penalty area.

=== World Cup matches ===
Tournament	Date	Venue	Round	Team 1	Result	Team 2	Red	2nd yellow	Yellow
1986	13 June	(Mexico) Estadio Neza 86, Ciudad Nezahualcóyotl	First Round	Uruguay	0 – 0	Scotland	1	0	5
1990	19 June	(Italy) Stadio Olimpico, Rome	First Round	Italy	2 – 0	Czechoslovakia	0	0	4
1990	24 June	(Italy) Stadio Delle Alpi, Turin	Round of 16	Brazil	0 – 1	Argentina	1	0	5
1990	7 July	(Italy) Stadio San Nicola, Bari	Match for third place	Italy	2 – 1	England	0	0	0
1994	24 June	(United States) Pontiac Silverdome, Pontiac	First Round	Sweden	3 – 1	Russia	1	1	6
1994	27 June	(United States) Cotton Bowl, Dallas	First Round	Germany	3 – 2	South Korea	0	0	4
1994	4 July	(United States) Stanford Stadium, Stanford	Round of 16	Brazil	1 – 0	United States	2	1	7
1994	13 July	(United States) Giants Stadium, East Rutherford	Semi-finals	Bulgaria	1 – 2	Italy	0	0	5

== Honours ==
Orders

- Knight of the National Order of Merit: 1994
- Knight of the Legion of Honour: 2000
