= José Batista =

Uruguayan footballer and manager (born 1962)

Personal information
- Full name: José Alberto Batista González
- Date of birth: 6 March 1962 (age 64)
- Place of birth: Colonia, Uruguay
- Height: 1.66 m (5 ft 5 1/2 in)
- Position: Defender

Senior career*
| Years | Team | Apps | (Gls) |
| 1979–1983 | C.A. Cerro | 46 | (6) |
| 1984–1985 | Club Atlético Peñarol | 42 | (2) |
| 1985–1995 | Deportivo Español | 328 | (20) |
| 1995 | Rampla Juniors | 9 | (0) |
| 1996–1998 | Gimnasia Jujuy | 47 | (3) |
| 1998–1999 | Deportivo Español | | |
| 1999–2000 | Argentino Quilmes | | |

International career
| 1984–1993 | Uruguay | 14 | (1) |

Managerial career
- 2009–2010: Deportivo Español
Medal record
Men's association football
Representing Uruguay
Pan American Games
| Gold medal – first place | 1983 Caracas | Team |
CONMEBOL–UEFA Cup of Champions
| Runner-up | 1985 France |
- * Club domestic league appearances and goals

José Alberto Batista González (born 6 March 1962) is an Uruguayan retired footballer who played as a defender, and a manager.

He is best known for having received a red card after 56 seconds – a World Cup record – in the 1986 game against Scotland. In spite of this, Uruguay held on for a 0–0 draw despite playing almost the entire match with ten men.

== Club career ==
Born in Colonia del Sacramento, Batista played for a number of clubs in Uruguay and Argentina, starting his career with C.A. Cerro and joining giants Club Atlético Peñarol in 1983. In 1985, he joined Deportivo Español in the latter nation, where he would spend the next decade.

Batista made a brief return to his country's top division in 1995, with Rampla Juniors. He spent his final three years with Gimnasia y Esgrima de Jujuy, Deportivo Español and Argentino de Quilmes, the latter in the Argentine second level.

== International career ==
Batista made a total of 14 appearances for the Uruguay national team, between 1984 and 1993. His debut came on 19 September in a friendly match with Peru, in Montevideo.

During the 1986 FIFA World Cup qualifiers Batista scored a crucial goal in a 2–1 home triumph over Chile, his only for the country; in the final stages' third game, on 13 June 1986, he was sent off after less than one minute of play for a reckless challenge on Scotland's Gordon Strachan, as Uruguay eventually bowed out in the round-of-16.
