= 1986 FIFA World Cup =

Association football tournament in Mexico

Copa Mundial de Fútbol México '86 (Spanish)
- 1986 FIFA World Cup official logo, designed by Rubén Santiago Hernández

Tournament details
- Host country: Mexico
- Dates: 31 May – 29 June
- Teams: 24 (from 5 confederations)
- Venues: 12 (in 11 host cities)

Final positions
- Champions: Argentina (2nd title)
- Runners-up: West Germany
- Third place: France
- Fourth place: Belgium

Tournament statistics
- Matches played: 52
- Goals scored: 132 (2.54 per match)
- Attendance: 2,394,031 (46,039 per match)
- Top scorer: (England) Gary Lineker (6 goals)
- Best player: (Argentina) Diego Maradona
- Best young player: (Belgium) Enzo Scifo
- Fair play award: Brazil

The 1986 FIFA World Cup was the 13th FIFA World Cup, the quadrennial football tournament for men's senior national teams. It was played in Mexico from 31 May to 29 June 1986. The tournament was the second to feature a 24-team format. Colombia had been originally chosen to host the competition by FIFA but, largely due to economic reasons, was not able to do so, and withdrew in November 1982. Mexico was selected as the new host in May 1983, and became the first country to host the World Cup more than once, after previously hosting the 1970 edition.

The World Cup was won by Argentina (their second title, after winning in 1978). Argentina was captained by the 25-year-old Diego Maradona, who played a large part in his team's success by scoring his "Hand of God" goal, as well as another voted the "Goal of the Century", in the same quarter-final match against England. These were two of the five goals that Maradona scored during the tournament, and he also created another five for his teammates. Argentina beat West Germany 3–2 in the final at Mexico City's Estadio Azteca. Argentina would not win the World Cup again until 2022, 36 years later. Total attendance was 2,394,031, an average per match of 46,039. Canada, Denmark and Iraq made their first appearances at the final stage.

The format of the competition changed from 1982. The final pair of matches in each group started at the same time and the second round was played on a knockout basis rather than groups. The 24 teams qualified were divided into six groups of four (A to F). The top two teams and the four best third-place finishers from the six groups advanced to the knockout round of 16 teams. Italy were the defending champions, but were eliminated by France in the round of 16.

The tournament saw the appearance of the Mexican wave, a spectator phenomenon which was popularised worldwide after featuring during the tournament.

== Host selection ==
Colombia was originally chosen as hosts by FIFA in June 1974, with Bogotá, Medellín, Cali, Pereira and Bucaramanga intended as the host cities, plus potentially Barranquilla. Colombia agreed to host a 16-team competition. However, days before the 1978 FIFA World Cup's opening match, FIFA later allowed an expansion to 24 teams for the 1982 World Cup in Spain, which was more challenging for Colombia to host, although FIFA President João Havelange initially gave assurances that they could revert to a 16-team tournament. Colombian president Julio César Turbay Ayala was initially against holding the tournament in his country, but reluctantly granted permission in October 1980. However, the next Colombian president, Belisario Betancur, declared on 5 November 1982 that they could not afford to host the World Cup under the terms that FIFA demanded.

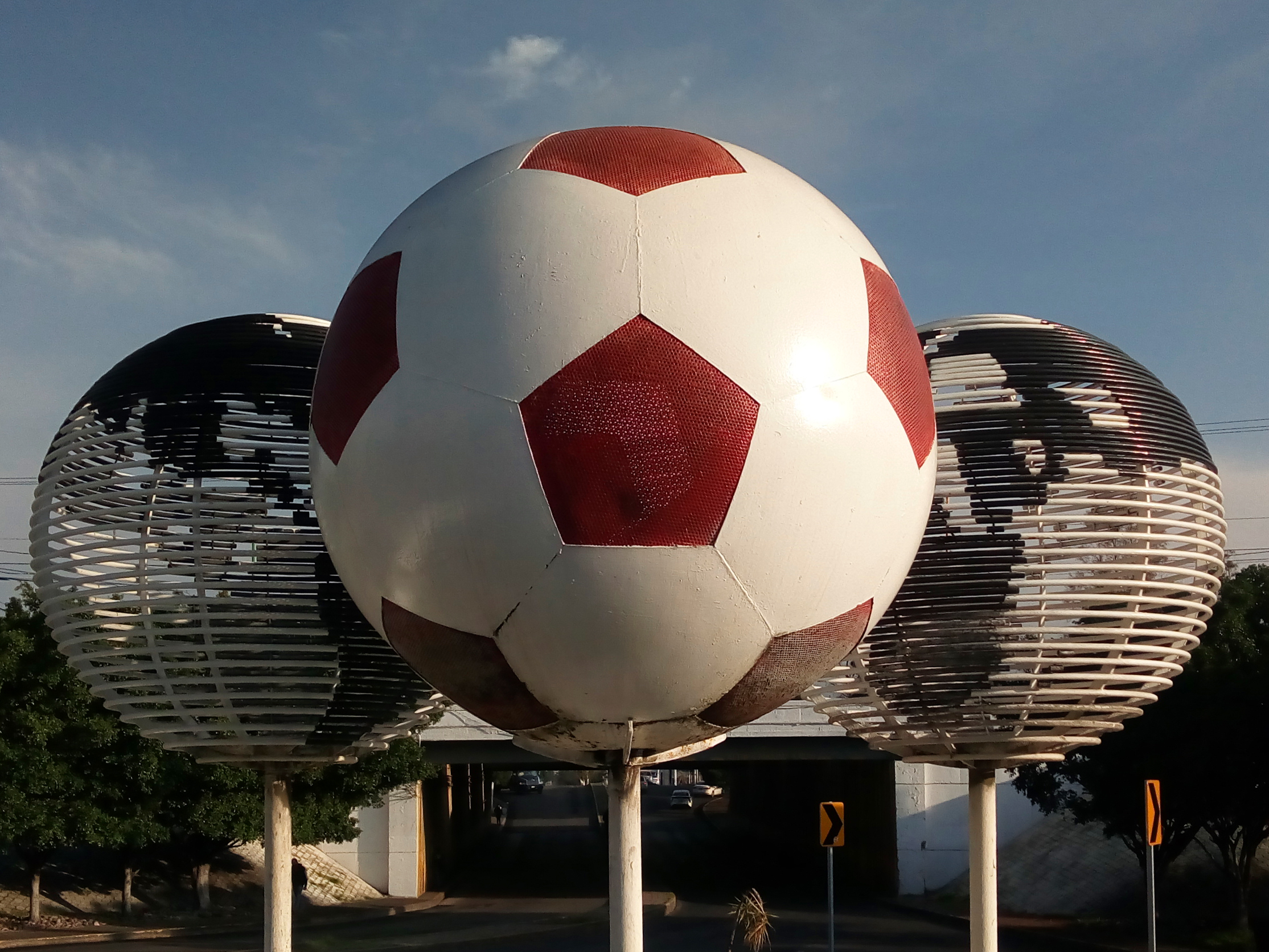
Football fountain created in 1986 to commemorate the FIFA World Cup in Mexico. Querétaro was one of the venues and this fountain is located just a few blocks away from the Corregidora Stadium

Although Mexico, United States and Canada submitted bids on 11 March 1983 to be the replacement host, (Brazil was the only other eligible bidder but did not bid) the five-person special FIFA committee responsible for recommending the bids to the Executive Committee (Exco) announced on 31 March that it would only consider Mexico's bid, saying the United States and Canada had "deviated" from FIFA's criteria and Exco members refused to visit Canadian and American stadium sites. On 20 May, the committee announced Mexico as the replacement hosts despite Havelange stating that the United States and Canada had made better presentations. Mexico became the first nation to host two World Cups, as it had hosted the 1970 FIFA World Cup.

Opening ceremony held in Estadio Azteca

The Canadian representatives criticised the committee's decision not to consider Canada, saying they had submitted a more complete bid than Mexico, and that they had been misled by the number of stadiums required for bidding. The United States' bid contained more than the required number of stadiums with the required capacity to host World Cup matches (at least 40,000 capacity, 60,000 for second-round matches and 80,000 for the tournament final). Mexico submitted a bid with 14 stadiums, only six of which seated over 40,000 at the time of the bid, and three over 60,000. Havelange in turn criticised the United States' handling of stadium selection for the football tournament at the 1984 Summer Olympics in Los Angeles. The Americans also pointed out that Mexico had the influence of two seats on the 22-person executive committee, a FIFA vice president and an executive at Televisa, a Mexican television network with ties to Havelange. Also working in Mexico's favour was Havelange secretly promising the broadcast rights to Televisa ahead of the vote. Following the bidding process, Henry Kissinger, the former United States Secretary of State who led the United States bid committee, remarked, "The politics of soccer make me nostalgic for the politics of the Middle East," while the leader of the Canadian committee called Mexico's 10-page bid document "a joke."

A severe earthquake in September 1985, eight months before the tournament, cast doubt over Mexico's ability to organise the event, but the stadiums were not affected and it was decided to go ahead with the preparations. As 1986 had been declared the International Year of Peace by the United Nations, the advertising boards of all the stadia displayed the FIFA and United Nations logos along with the legend "Football for Peace – Peace Year".

For the design of the logo an unofficial motto was adopted: "El Mundo Unido por Un Balón" ("The World United by a Ball").

The final draw took place on 15 December 1985 hosted at Televisa San Ángel studios in Mexico City.

== Qualification ==
Argentina qualified in the last fixture after a 2–2 draw v Peru

Three teams qualified for the World Cup for the first time: Canada, Denmark, and Iraq. Iraq played all their 'home' matches on neutral ground in Saudi Arabia because of the Iran–Iraq War. Canada would not appear again until 2022, and Iraq would not appear again until the next time the tournament was held in Mexico in 2026. South Korea qualified for the first time since 1954, Paraguay for the first time since 1958, Portugal for the first time since 1966, Morocco for the first time since 1970 and Bulgaria and Uruguay for the first time since 1974. It remains as of 2026 the last appearance of Hungary and Northern Ireland.

All six previous World Cup-winning nations (Argentina, Brazil, England, West Germany, Italy, and Uruguay) qualified, which held the record of most previous champions at a tournament before the record was broken in 2002 with the addition of France (who won the 1998 tournament) and a second time in 2014 with the addition of Spain (who won the 2010 tournament).

=== List of qualified teams ===
The following 24 teams qualified for the final tournament.

AFC (2)

- Iraq (debut)
- South Korea

CAF (2)

- Algeria
- Morocco

OFC (0)

- None qualified

CONCACAF (2)

- Canada (debut)
- Mexico (hosts)

CONMEBOL (4)

- Argentina
- Brazil
- Paraguay
- Uruguay

UEFA (14)

- Belgium
- Bulgaria
- Denmark (debut)
- England
- France
- Hungary
- Italy (holders)
- Northern Ireland
- Poland
- Portugal
- Scotland
- Soviet Union
- Spain
- West Germany

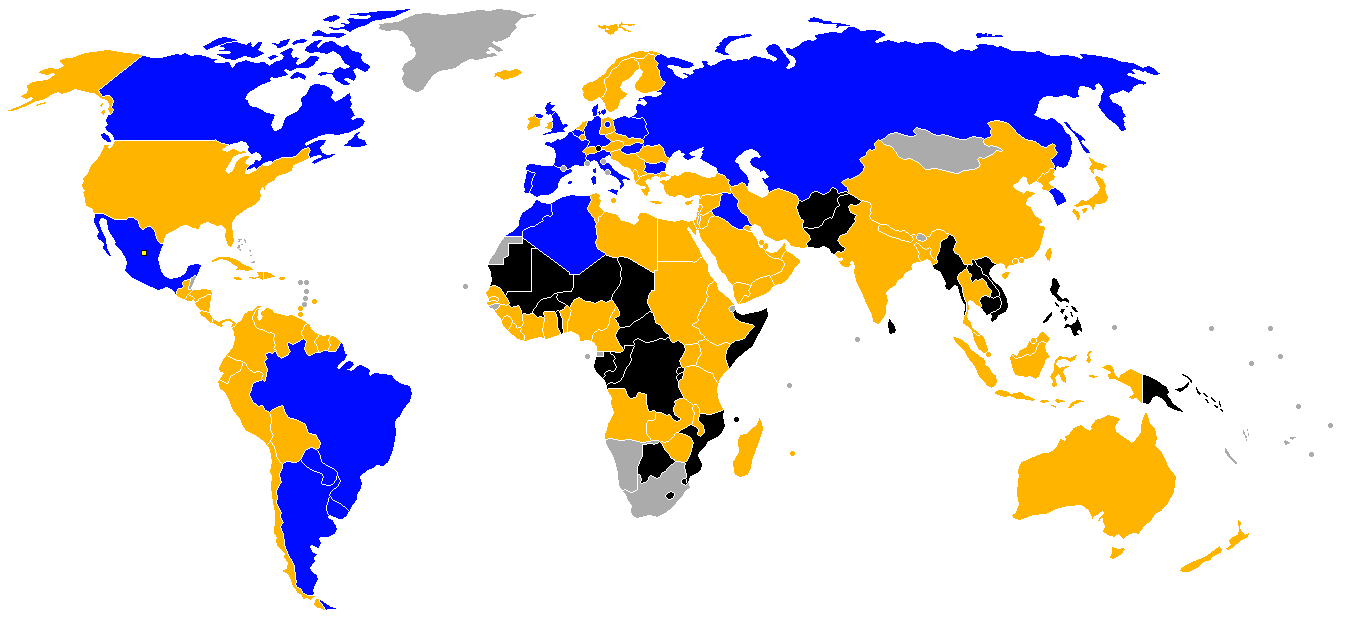
Countries qualified for World Cup Country did not qualify Countries that did not enter World Cup Country not a FIFA member

== Venues ==
Eleven cities hosted the tournament, with a total of twelve stadiums used (two of them in Mexico City), among which were counted all five stadia that hosted the 1970 tournament. The Azteca Stadium in Mexico City, the largest stadium used for the tournament, hosted nine matches (including the final), more than any other stadium used. Mexico City hosted 13 total matches; the Olimpico Universitario Stadium hosted four matches (if the Mexico City suburban town Nezahualcoyotl's three matches are included, this brings the total up to 16 matches; nearly a third of all matches in this tournament). Guadalajara, Mexico's second largest city hosted nine total matches (the Jalisco Stadium hosted six matches, the Tres de Marzo Stadium in Zapopan hosted three), Monterrey hosted eight matches (The Tecnologico Stadium hosted three matches and the Universitario Stadium in San Nicolas de los Garza hosted five matches), and the Cuauhtémoc Stadium in Puebla hosted five matches.

The hot, humid and rainy summer weather in Mexico varied from humid desert locations like Monterrey to tropical locations such as Guadalajara; but perhaps the greatest hardship the players had to contend with was the high altitude of the Mexican locations. With the exception of the 93–104 °F (34–40 °C) temperatures of Monterrey (still 2,000 feet above sea level), all of the stadia were located in cities that varied anywhere from Guadalajara being 5,138 feet (1,566 m) above sea level to Toluca being 8,730 feet (2,660 m) above sea level, making conditions very difficult for the players running around in these stadia – but the higher the cities, the less intense the heat. Mexico City, the location of the opening and final matches and the location where the most matches were played was 7,380 feet (2,250 m) above sea level and the weather there was not as hot as in other cities used in this World Cup.

Mexico City		Guadalajara, Jalisco	Puebla City, Puebla
Estadio Azteca	Estadio Olímpico Universitario	Estadio Jalisco	Estadio Cuauhtémoc
Capacity: 114,600	Capacity: 72,212	Capacity: 66,193	Capacity: 46,416
San Nicolás de los Garza, Nuevo León (Monterrey area)	1986 FIFA World Cup is located in Mexico		Querétaro, Querétaro
Estadio Universitario	1986 FIFA World Cup is located in Mexico		Estadio La Corregidora
Capacity: 43,780	1986 FIFA World Cup is located in Mexico		Capacity: 38,576
Nezahualcóyotl, State of Mexico (Mexico City area)	1986 FIFA World Cup is located in Mexico		Monterrey, Nuevo León
Estadio Neza 86	Stadiums in Mexico City (labeled as MXC above)		Estadio Tecnológico
Capacity: 34,536	Stadiums in Mexico City (labeled as MXC above)		Capacity: 33,805
Toluca, State of Mexico	Irapuato, Guanajuato	León, Guanajuato	Zapopan, Jalisco (Guadalajara area)
Estadio Toluca 70–86	Estadio Sergio León Chávez	Estadio Nou Camp	Estadio Tres de Marzo
Capacity: 32,612	Capacity: 31,336	Capacity: 30,531	Capacity: 30,015

All of these venues except Monterrey were located in central Mexico, as this tournament was organized with the then-standard way of keeping teams playing in locations in close proximity to each other. Group A only played at the Olimpico and in Puebla (except for the Bulgaria-Italy opening tournament match, which was played in the Azteca), Group B only played at the Azteca and in Toluca (hosts Mexico were part of this group; they played all their group stage matches at the Azteca), Group C played in León and Irapuato, Group D only played in Guadalajara (including the Guadalajara area town of Zapopan; the last match of this group was played in Monterrey), Group E exclusively played in Querétaro and Nezahualcóyotl, and Group F played in the northern city of Monterrey (including the Monterrey area town of San Nicolas de los Garza; the last match of this group was played in Guadalajara). All of the venues listed hosted knockout round matches except the ones in Nezahualcoyotl, Irapuato, Zapopan, Toluca and the Estadio Tecnologico in Monterrey.

Stadium	Matches	Teams hosted in the first round
Estadio Azteca	Opening match, Group B, R2, QF, SF, Final	Mexico
Estadio Olímpico Universitario	Group A, R2	Argentina, Bulgaria, South Korea
Estadio Jalisco	Group D, R2, QF, SF	Brazil
Estadio Cuauhtémoc	Group A, R2, QF, Match for third place	Italy
Estadio Universitario	Group F, R2, QF	Poland
Estadio La Corregidora	Group E, R2	West Germany
Estadio Tecnológico	Group F	England, Portugal*, Morocco*
Estadio Nou Camp	Group C, R2	France
Estadio Neza 86	Group E	Uruguay, Denmark, Scotland
Estadio Sergio León Chávez	Group C	Soviet Union, Hungary, Canada
Estadio Tres de Marzo	Group D	Spain*, Northern Ireland, Algeria*
Estadio Toluca 70–86	Group B	Belgium, Paraguay, Iraq

- Morocco and Portugal played in Guadalajara while Spain and Algeria played in Monterrey.

== Match officials ==
Africa

- (Tunisia) Ali Ben Nasser
- (Mauritius) Edwin Picon-Ackong
- (Mali) Idrissa Traoré

Asia

- (Saudi Arabia) Fallaj Al-Shanar
- (Syria) Jamal Al Sharif
- (Japan) Shizuo Takada

Europe

- (Italy) Luigi Agnolin
- (Austria) Horst Brummeier
- (Soviet Union) Valeri Butenko
- (Czechoslovakia) Vojtech Christov
- (England) George Courtney
- (Switzerland) André Daina
- (Bulgaria) Bogdan Dotchev
- (Sweden) Erik Fredriksson
- (Romania) Ioan Igna
- (Netherlands) Jan Keizer
- (East Germany) Siegfried Kirschen
- (Hungary) Lajos Németh
- (Socialist Federal Republic of Yugoslavia) Zoran Petrović
- (Belgium) Alexis Ponnet
- (France) Joël Quiniou
- (West Germany) Volker Roth
- (Spain) Victoriano Sánchez Arminio
- (Portugal) Carlos Silva Valente
- (Northern Ireland) Alan Snoddy

North and Central America

- (Guatemala) Rómulo Méndez
- (Mexico) Antonio Márquez Ramírez
- (United States) David Socha
- (Costa Rica) Berny Ulloa Morera

Oceania

- (Australia) Chris Bambridge

South America

- (Brazil) Romualdo Arppi Filho
- (Colombia) Jesús Díaz
- (Argentina) Carlos Espósito
- (Paraguay) Gabriel González Roa
- (Uruguay) José Luis Martínez Bazán
- (Chile) Hernán Silva

== Squads ==
For a list of all squads that appeared in the final tournament, see 1986 FIFA World Cup squads.

== Seeding ==
Seeded teams (hosts and top 5 from 1982 World Cup)	Pot 1	Pot 2	Pot 3
Mexico (hosts); Italy (1982 winners); West Germany (1982 runners-up); Poland (1982 third place); France (1982 fourth place); Brazil (1982 fifth place)	England; Soviet Union; Spain; Argentina; Paraguay; Uruguay	Canada; Denmark; Algeria; Morocco; Iraq; South Korea	Belgium; Bulgaria; Hungary; Northern Ireland; Portugal; Scotland

== Summary ==
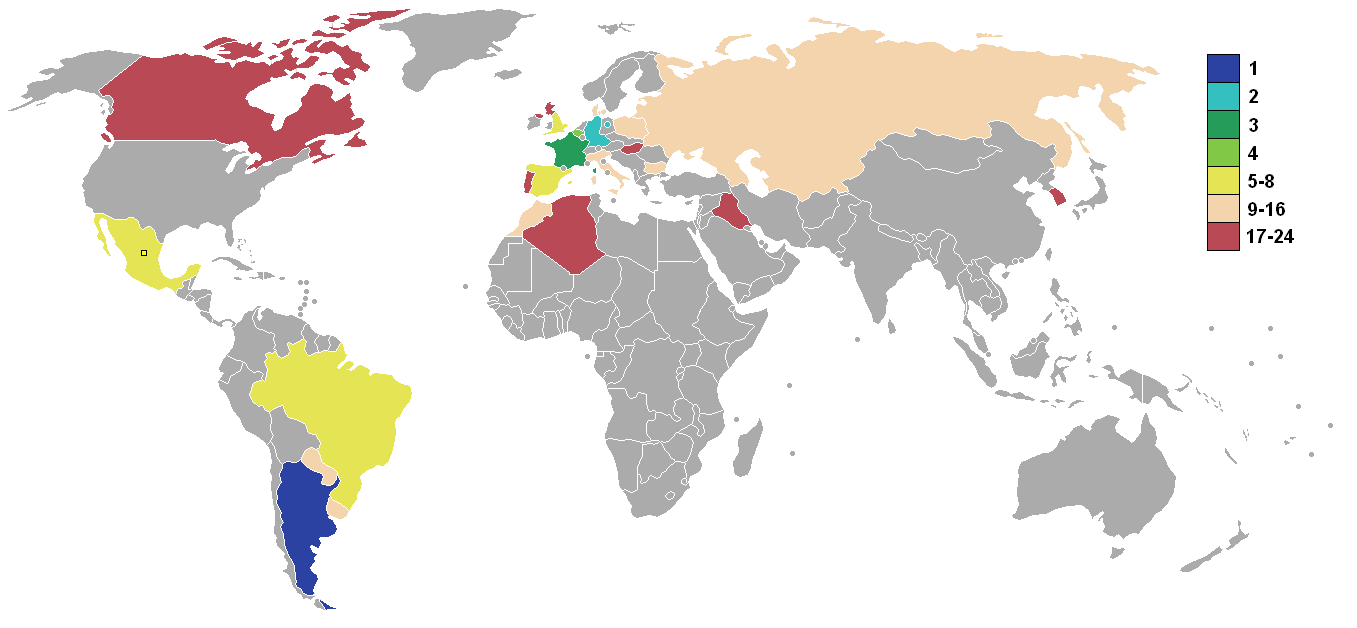
Map of results Champion Runner-up Third place Fourth place Quarter-finals Round of 16 Group stage

=== First round (group stage) ===
The first round of the finals began in Group A, where Italy were held 1–1 by Bulgaria. Meanwhile, Argentina beat South Korea 3–1, with Diego Maradona playing a major part. Italy and Argentina drew 1–1, Maradona and Alessandro Altobelli scoring. South Korea and Bulgaria also drew 1–1 in a downpour. The final set of matches saw Argentina beating Bulgaria 2–0, and Italy narrowly defeating South Korea 3–2.

In Group B Mexico beat Belgium 2–1, and despite being held 1–1 by Paraguay, they won the group after a further win over Iraq, 1–0. Paraguay and Belgium also progressed after both beating Iraq and drawing with each other.

Group C pitted a strong Dynamo Kyiv-dominated Soviet Union side against the reigning European champions France. They drew with each other 1–1, with a goal scored by Vasyl Rats. France beat Canada 1–0 and finished in 2nd place in the group after beating Hungary, 3–0. Hungary had earlier lost 6–0 against the Soviet Union, which won the group due to goal difference.

Group D saw Brazil start against Spain, winning 1–0 after the referee failed to validate a legal goal scored by Míchel. Northern Ireland began their campaign with a draw against Algeria. Northern Ireland were then narrowly beaten by Spain before losing to Brazil 3–0 in their final match. This match saw a goal from Josimar on his debut and was also the final time Pat Jennings played for Northern Ireland. Spain qualified along with Brazil after defeating Algeria 3–0.

Denmark stormed through Group E, dubbed the group of death, with a 100 per cent record. They beat Alex Ferguson's Scotland 1–0 in their first game, then hammered Uruguay 6–1, with Preben Elkjær hitting a hat-trick. Denmark beat one of the favourites to win the tournament, West Germany, 2–0 thanks to a Jesper Olsen penalty and a goal from John Eriksen. After losing to Denmark, Scotland took the lead against West Germany thanks to a Gordon Strachan goal, but the West Germans fought back to win 2–1. After a violent 0–0 draw against Uruguay, the Scots were eliminated from the tournament. During that game José Batista of Uruguay was sent off after less than one minute of play for a foul on Strachan, a World Cup record that still stands. West Germany went through to the second round despite a loss against Denmark.

Morocco topped Group F after holding both Poland and England to goalless draws, and beating Portugal 3–1. By doing so, they became the first African team, and only the second nation from outside Europe and the Americas (after North Korea in 1966), to reach the second round. England lost 1–0 to Portugal, followed by a 0–0 draw against Morocco in which they lost captain Bryan Robson to injury (for the remainder of the tournament) and vice-captain Ray Wilkins to a red card (he was not selected for the remainder of the tournament, even after having served his obligatory one-match ban). In their last first-round game, with the captaincy taken over by Peter Shilton in goal, a first-half Gary Lineker hat-trick helped the reshaped side beat Poland 3–0 – although losing yet another player to a ban for the next round, Terry Fenwick receiving his second booking of the tournament. Poland had previously beaten Portugal, and in the end the Portuguese were the only team from Group F to be eliminated in the first round. Portugal, making their first appearance in 20 years, went on strike (in the Saltillo Affair) during the competition. Players refused to train between their first and second games (against England and Poland) and were eliminated after a loss to Morocco in the final group match.

=== Second round and quarter-finals (knockout rounds) ===
Belgium beat the Soviet Union 4–3, despite a hat-trick by the Soviets' Igor Belanov. The game was level at 2–2 after 90 minutes, and in extra time Stephane Demol and Nico Claesen put Belgium 4–2 up. Belanov scored from the penalty spot with nine minutes remaining, but neither he nor any of his teammates could find a fourth goal for the Soviet Union. At the Olympic University Stadium in Mexico City, the European champions France ended Italy's reign as world champions with a 2–0 victory thanks to goals from Michel Platini and Yannick Stopyra. In the rematch of the 1930 FIFA World Cup Final, Argentina just edged out South American champions Uruguay in Puebla thanks to a 42nd-minute strike from Pedro Pasculli. The all-South American affair had a Diego Maradona goal disallowed.

In Querétaro, Denmark were eliminated as they went from a 1–0 lead to a 5–1 battering against Spain; key player Frank Arnesen was suspended for the game after being sent off against West Germany in their last group match, for taking a swipe at German playmaker Lothar Matthäus. The Danes scored first, with a Jesper Olsen penalty, but they were then taken apart by a devastating performance from Butragueño of Spain, who scored four of his team's five goals. At the Azteca Stadium in Mexico City, England progressed to the quarter-finals comfortably when they saw off Paraguay 3–0, while Brazil brushed aside Poland 4–0. West Germany had a much harder time getting past Morocco, for whom goalkeeper Badou Zaki had an outstanding game. Morocco held out until the 87th minute, when Lothar Matthäus scored the only goal of the match with a free kick. Mexico won 2–0 against Bulgaria with an outstanding scissor-kick goal by Manuel Negrete which is honored by a remembrance plaque at the Azteca.

In the quarter-finals, France faced three-time world champion Brazil in Guadalajara. Brazil were well on top in the early stages, and Careca put them one up after 18 minutes. Five minutes before half-time, France drew level when Michel Platini scored his 41st goal after converting a cross from Dominique Rocheteau. Brazil had a chance to regain the lead in the second half when Branco was fouled by French keeper Joël Bats in the penalty area. Zico got up to take the kick, but Bats saved Zico's penalty.

The match went to extra time, and France finished slightly the stronger of the two sides. No more goals were scored, and so it was time for a penalty shoot-out. Socrates, who had earlier missed an open goal and headed an easy chance straight into the French keeper's arms, failed with the first kick for Brazil. The next six penalties were all converted, and then Platini fired over the bar. Brazil were back on level terms – but not for long. Julio Cesar struck the post with his penalty, and Luis Fernández then scored to put France through 4–3 on penalties.

Two other quarter-finals were also decided on penalties. Jan Ceulemans put Belgium ahead against Spain in the 35th minute, but Spanish substitute Señor equalised with five minutes to go. No more goals were scored in extra time, and Belgium won the shoot-out 5–4. On the hosts' first game outside of the Azteca, Francisco Javier Cruz saw a goal disallowed as West Germany and Mexico drew 0–0 after extra time. The West Germans eliminated the hosts 4–1 on penalties. As a curiosity, the German goalkeeper Harald Schumacher jumped to the right in the three Mexican penalties (stopping two of them).

The quarter-final between Argentina and England at the Azteca featured two very different goals in the second half by Diego Maradona: the first was scored illegally, as he punched the ball into the goal past England goalkeeper Peter Shilton. The referee did not see the handball and the goal was given as valid. After the game, Maradona claimed the goal was scored "A bit with the head of Maradona and another bit with the hand of God"; it became known as the "Hand of God" goal. For his second goal, voted "Goal of the Century" in 2002 on the FIFA website, Maradona dribbled half the length of the field past five English players before scoring. With 20 minutes to go, the introduction of John Barnes as a substitute changed the tide of play in England's favour, as he pinged cross after cross into the Argentine penalty area: with 9 minutes to go, Lineker got on the end of one and scored, then almost repeated the dose six minutes later but was just unable to reach the ball thanks to a timely block by Olarticoechea: 2–1 to Argentina was the final score. In Argentina, the game was seen as revenge for the Falklands War.

=== Semi-finals, match for third place and final ===
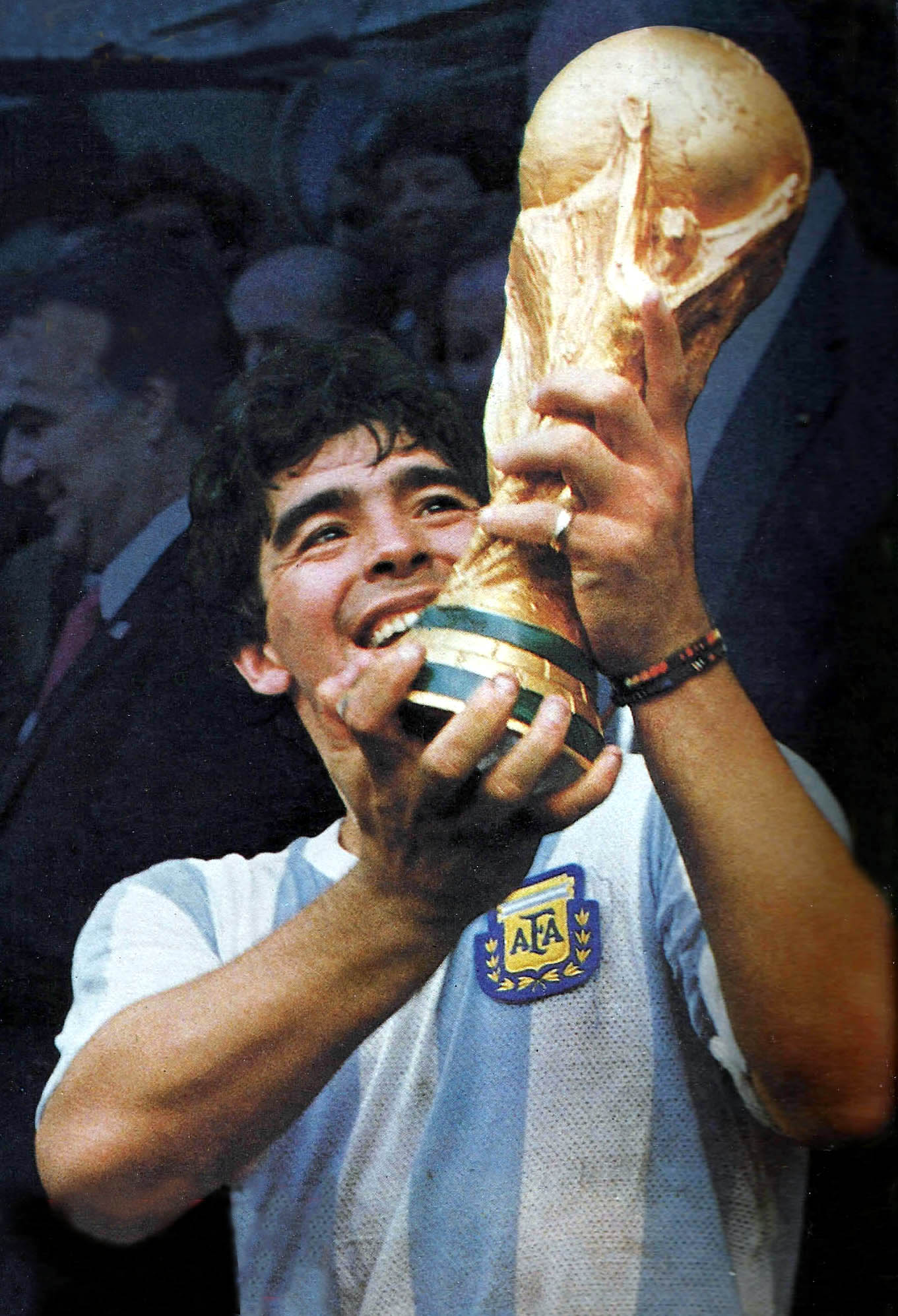
Diego Maradona celebrating with the Trophy. Argentina won the tournament unbeaten

In the first semi-final match, Andreas Brehme put West Germany 1–0 ahead against France in the ninth minute in Guadalajara, but the outcome remained in doubt until two minutes from time when Rudi Völler made it 2–0, and West Germany were in the final for the second World Cup in succession. In the second semi-final match, Maradona struck twice in the second half as Argentina beat Belgium 2–0 at the Azteca. France went on to defeat Belgium in the match for third place, 4–2 at extra time. As of 2026, it remains the only third place match to go to extra time.

So it was to be the South American Argentina vs the European West Germany at the final at the Azteca, the second time this massive stadium would host a World Cup Final (the first in 1970). Jose Brown put Argentina one up midway through the first half of the final, and when Jorge Valdano scored a second for the South Americans in the 55th minute, Argentina looked to be strolling to victory. West Germany then staged a spirited comeback. Karl-Heinz Rummenigge pulled one back in the 74th minute, and six minutes later Rudi Völler hit the equaliser. With seven minutes remaining, a pass from Maradona gave Jorge Burruchaga the chance to score the winner for Argentina. Eight years on from their home triumph, Argentina regained the world title and 30 million people in Argentina celebrated in the streets after the final victory. Maradona was the Golden Ball winner as the best player of the tournament, while Gary Lineker of England won the Golden Boot as the leading scorer of the World Cup with six goals.

== Group stage ==
All times are Central Time (UTC−6)

Key to colours in group tables
Group winners, runners-up, and best four third-placed teams advance to the round of 16

=== Group A ===
Diego Maradona scoring for Argentina v Italy

Pos	Team	Pld	W	D	L	GF	GA	GD	Pts	Qualification
1	Argentina	3	2	1	0	6	2	+4	5	Advance to knockout stage
2	Italy	3	1	2	0	5	4	+1	4	Advance to knockout stage
3	Bulgaria	3	0	2	1	2	4	−2	2	Advance to knockout stage
4	South Korea	3	0	1	2	4	7	−3	1	

Source: FIFA
31 May 1986
12:00 CST

Bulgaria	1–1	Italy
Sirakov 85'		Altobelli 44'

Estadio Azteca, Mexico City
Attendance: 96,000
Referee: Erik Fredriksson (Sweden)
2 June 1986
12:00 CST

Argentina	3–1	South Korea
Valdano 6', 46'; Ruggeri 18'		Park Chang-Sun 73'

Estadio Olímpico Universitario, Mexico City
Attendance: 60,000
Referee: Victoriano Sánchez Arminio (Spain)

5 June 1986
12:00 CST

Italy	1–1	Argentina
Altobelli 6' (pen.)		Maradona 34'

Estadio Cuauhtémoc, Puebla
Attendance: 32,000
Referee: Jan Keizer (Netherlands)
5 June 1986
16:00 CST

South Korea	1–1	Bulgaria
Kim Jong-Boo 70'		Getov 11'

Estadio Olímpico Universitario, Mexico City
Attendance: 45,000
Referee: Fallaj Al Shanar (Saudi Arabia)

10 June 1986
12:00 CST

South Korea	2–3	Italy
Choi Soon-Ho 62'; Huh Jung-Moo 89'		Altobelli 17', 73'; Cho Kwang-Rae 82' (o.g.)

Estadio Cuauhtémoc, Puebla
Attendance: 20,000
Referee: David Socha (United States)
10 June 1986
12:00 CST

Argentina	2–0	Bulgaria
Valdano 4'; Burruchaga 77'

Estadio Olímpico Universitario, Mexico City
Attendance: 65,000
Referee: Berny Ulloa Morera (Costa Rica)

=== Group B ===
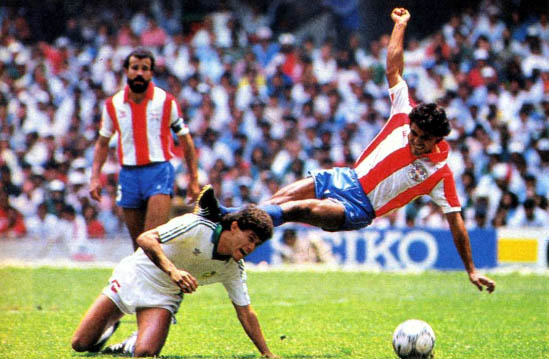
Cruz and Cabañas going for the ball in Mexico v Paraguay

Pos	Team	Pld	W	D	L	GF	GA	GD	Pts	Qualification
1	Mexico (H)	3	2	1	0	4	2	+2	5	Advance to knockout stage
2	Paraguay	3	1	2	0	4	3	+1	4	Advance to knockout stage
3	Belgium	3	1	1	1	5	5	0	3	Advance to knockout stage
4	Iraq	3	0	0	3	1	4	−3	0	

Source: FIFA
(H) Hosts
3 June 1986
12:00 CST

Belgium	1–2	Mexico
Vandenbergh 45'		Quirarte 23'; Sánchez 39'

Estadio Azteca, Mexico City
Attendance: 110,000
Referee: Carlos Espósito (Argentina)
4 June 1986
12:00 CST

Paraguay	1–0	Iraq
Romerito 35'

Estadio Toluca 70–86, Toluca
Attendance: 24,000
Referee: Edwin Picon-Ackong (Mauritius)

7 June 1986
12:00 CST

Mexico	1–1	Paraguay
Flores 3'		Romerito 85'

Estadio Azteca, Mexico City
Attendance: 114,600
Referee: George Courtney (England)
8 June 1986
12:00 CST

Iraq	1–2	Belgium
Radhi 59'		Scifo 16'; Claesen 21' (pen.)

Estadio Toluca 70–86, Toluca
Attendance: 20,000
Referee: Jesús Díaz (Colombia)

11 June 1986
12:00 CST

Paraguay	2–2	Belgium
Cabañas 50', 76'		Vercauteren 30'; Veyt 59'

Estadio Toluca 70–86, Toluca
Attendance: 16,000
Referee: Bogdan Dotchev (Bulgaria)
11 June 1986
12:00 CST

Iraq	0–1	Mexico
		Quirarte 54'

Estadio Azteca, Mexico City
Attendance: 103,763
Referee: Zoran Petrović (Yugoslavia)

=== Group C ===
France v Canada

Pos	Team	Pld	W	D	L	GF	GA	GD	Pts	Qualification
1	Soviet Union	3	2	1	0	9	1	+8	5	Advance to knockout stage
2	France	3	2	1	0	5	1	+4	5	Advance to knockout stage
3	Hungary	3	1	0	2	2	9	−7	2	
4	Canada	3	0	0	3	0	5	−5	0	

Source: FIFA
1 June 1986
16:00 CST

Canada	0–1	France
		Papin 79'

Estadio Nou Camp, León
Attendance: 35,748 (Note: The FIFA technical report mistakenly interchanged the attendance data for the 1 June matches.)
Referee: Hernán Silva (Chile)
2 June 1986
12:00 CST

Soviet Union	6–0	Hungary
Yakovenko 2'; Aleinikov 4'; Belanov 24' (pen.); Yaremchuk 66'; Dajka 73' (o.g.); Rodionov 80'

Estadio Sergio León Chavez, Irapuato
Attendance: 16,500
Referee: Luigi Agnolin (Italy)

5 June 1986
12:00 CST

France	1–1	Soviet Union
Fernández 62'		Rats 53'

Estadio Nou Camp, León
Attendance: 36,540
Referee: Romualdo Arppi Filho (Brazil)
6 June 1986
12:00 CST

Hungary	2–0	Canada
Esterházy 2'; Détári 75'

Estadio Sergio León Chavez, Irapuato
Attendance: 13,800
Referee: Jamal Al Sharif (Syria)

9 June 1986
12:00 CST

Hungary	0–3	France
		Stopyra 29'; Tigana 62'; Rocheteau 84'

Estadio Nou Camp, León
Attendance: 31,420
Referee: Carlos Silva Valente (Portugal)
9 June 1986
12:00 CST

Soviet Union	2–0	Canada
Blokhin 58'; Zavarov 74'

Estadio Sergio León Chavez, Irapuato
Attendance: 14,200
Referee: Idrissa Traoré (Mali)

=== Group D ===
Spain v Brazil

Pos	Team	Pld	W	D	L	GF	GA	GD	Pts	Qualification
1	Brazil	3	3	0	0	5	0	+5	6	Advance to knockout stage
2	Spain	3	2	0	1	5	2	+3	4	Advance to knockout stage
3	Northern Ireland	3	0	1	2	2	6	−4	1	
4	Algeria	3	0	1	2	1	5	−4	1	

Source: FIFA
1 June 1986
12:00 CST

Spain	0–1	Brazil
		Sócrates 62'

Estadio Jalisco, Guadalajara
Attendance: 65,500
Referee: Chris Bambridge (Australia)
3 June 1986
12:00 CST

Algeria	1–1	Northern Ireland
Zidane 59'		Whiteside 6'

Estadio Tres de Marzo, Zapopan
Attendance: 22,000
Referee: Valeri Butenko (Soviet Union)

6 June 1986
12:00 CST

Brazil	1–0	Algeria
Careca 66'

Estadio Jalisco, Guadalajara
Attendance: 48,000
Referee: Rómulo Méndez (Guatemala)
7 June 1986
12:00 CST

Northern Ireland	1–2	Spain
Clarke 46'		Butragueño 1'; Salinas 18'

Estadio Tres de Marzo, Zapopan
Attendance: 28,000
Referee: Horst Brummeier (Austria)

12 June 1986
12:00 CST

Northern Ireland	0–3	Brazil
		Careca 15', 87'; Josimar 42'

Estadio Jalisco, Guadalajara
Attendance: 51,000
Referee: Siegfried Kirschen (East Germany)
12 June 1986
12:00 CST

Algeria	0–3	Spain
		Calderé 15', 68'; Eloy 70'

Estadio Tecnológico, Monterrey
Attendance: 23,980
Referee: Shizuo Takada (Japan)

=== Group E ===
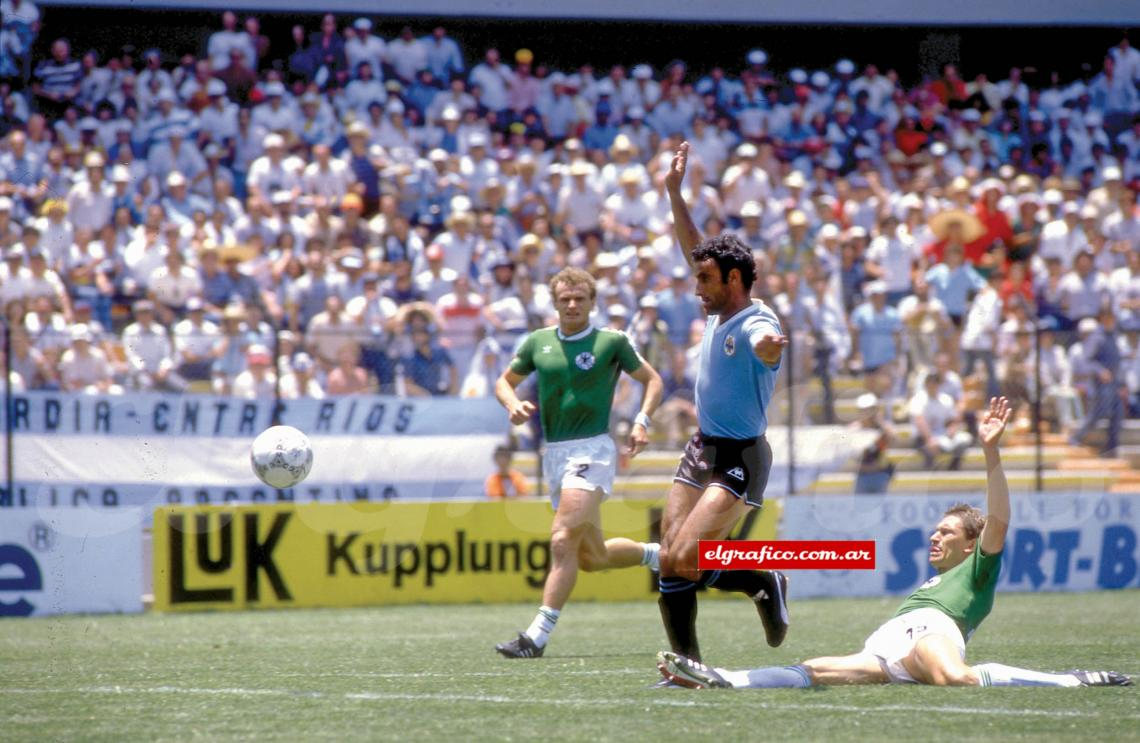
Antonio Alzamendi scoring for Uruguay v West Germany

Pos	Team	Pld	W	D	L	GF	GA	GD	Pts	Qualification
1	Denmark	3	3	0	0	9	1	+8	6	Advance to knockout stage
2	West Germany	3	1	1	1	3	4	−1	3	Advance to knockout stage
3	Uruguay	3	0	2	1	2	7	−5	2	Advance to knockout stage
4	Scotland	3	0	1	2	1	3	−2	1	

Source: FIFA
4 June 1986
12:00 CST

Uruguay	1–1	West Germany
Alzamendi 4'		Allofs 84'

Estadio La Corregidora, Querétaro
Attendance: 30,500
Referee: Vojtěch Christov (Czechoslovakia)
4 June 1986
16:00 CST

Scotland	0–1	Denmark
		Elkjær 57'

Estadio Neza 86, Nezahualcóyotl
Attendance: 18,000
Referee: Lajos Németh (Hungary)

8 June 1986
12:00 CST

West Germany	2–1	Scotland
Völler 23'; Allofs 49'		Strachan 18'

Estadio La Corregidora, Querétaro
Attendance: 30,000
Referee: Ioan Igna (Romania)
8 June 1986
16:00 CST

Denmark	6–1	Uruguay
Elkjær 11', 67', 80'; Lerby 41'; Laudrup 52'; J. Olsen 88'		Francescoli 45' (pen.)

Estadio Neza 86, Nezahualcóyotl
Attendance: 26,500
Referee: Antonio Márquez Ramírez (Mexico)

13 June 1986
12:00 CST

Denmark	2–0	West Germany
J. Olsen 43' (pen.); Eriksen 62'

Estadio La Corregidora, Querétaro
Attendance: 36,000
Referee: Alexis Ponnet (Belgium)
13 June 1986
12:00 CST

Scotland	0–0	Uruguay

Estadio Neza 86, Nezahualcóyotl
Attendance: 20,000
Referee: Joël Quiniou (France)

=== Group F ===
Morocco v Portugal

Pos	Team	Pld	W	D	L	GF	GA	GD	Pts	Qualification
1	Morocco	3	1	2	0	3	1	+2	4	Advance to knockout stage
2	England	3	1	1	1	3	1	+2	3	Advance to knockout stage
3	Poland	3	1	1	1	1	3	−2	3	Advance to knockout stage
4	Portugal	3	1	0	2	2	4	−2	2	

Source: FIFA
2 June 1986
16:00 CST

Morocco	0–0	Poland

Estadio Universitario, San Nicolás de los Garza
Attendance: 19,900
Referee: José Luis Martínez Bazán (Uruguay)
3 June 1986
16:00 CST

Portugal	1–0	England
Carlos Manuel 75'

Estadio Tecnológico, Monterrey
Attendance: 23,000
Referee: Volker Roth (West Germany)

6 June 1986
16:00 CST

England	0–0	Morocco

Estadio Tecnológico, Monterrey
Attendance: 20,200
Referee: Gabriel González (Paraguay)
7 June 1986
16:00 CST

Poland	1–0	Portugal
Smolarek 68'

Estadio Universitario, San Nicolás de los Garza
Attendance: 19,915
Referee: Ali Bin Nasser (Tunisia)

11 June 1986
16:00 CST

England	3–0	Poland
Lineker 8', 14', 36'

Estadio Universitario, San Nicolás de los Garza
Attendance: 22,700
Referee: André Daina (Switzerland)
11 June 1986
16:00 CST

Portugal	1–3	Morocco
Diamantino 80'		Khairi 19', 27'; A. Merry 62'

Estadio Tres de Marzo, Zapopan
Attendance: 28,000
Referee: Alan Snoddy (Northern Ireland)

=== Ranking of third-placed teams ===
Pos	Grp	Team	Pld	W	D	L	GF	GA	GD	Pts	Qualification
1	B	Belgium	3	1	1	1	5	5	0	3	Advance to knockout stage
2	F	Poland	3	1	1	1	1	3	−2	3	Advance to knockout stage
3	A	Bulgaria	3	0	2	1	2	4	−2	2	Advance to knockout stage
4	E	Uruguay	3	0	2	1	2	7	−5	2	Advance to knockout stage
5	C	Hungary	3	1	0	2	2	9	−7	2	
6	D	Northern Ireland	3	0	1	2	2	6	−4	1	

Source: FIFA

== Knockout stage ==
Argentina beat West Germany for the first time and won their second World Cup. Belgium finished in fourth place, their best finish in the World Cup until 2018, where they finished third.

=== Bracket ===
Round of 16
16 June – Puebla
Argentina	1
Uruguay	0
18 June – Mexico City (Azteca)
England	3
Paraguay	0
18 June – Querétaro
Denmark	1
Spain	5
15 June – León
Soviet Union	3
Belgium (a.e.t.)	4
16 June – Guadalajara
Brazil	4
Poland	0
17 June – Mexico City (Olímpico)
Italy	0
France	2
17 June – San Nicolás de los Garza
Morocco	0
West Germany	1
15 June – Mexico City (Azteca)
Mexico	2
Bulgaria	0

Quarter-finals
22 June – Mexico City (Azteca)
Argentina	2
England	1
22 June – Puebla
Spain	1 (4)
Belgium (p)	1 (5)
21 June – Guadalajara
Brazil	1 (3)
France (p)	1 (4)
21 June – San Nicolás de los Garza
West Germany (p)	0 (4)
Mexico	0 (1)

Semi-finals
25 June – Mexico City (Azteca)
Argentina	2
Belgium	0
25 June – Guadalajara
France	0
West Germany	2

Final
29 June – Mexico City (Azteca)
Argentina	3
West Germany	2
Match for third place
28 June – Puebla
Belgium	2
France (a.e.t.)	4

=== Round of 16 ===
15 June 1986
12:00 CST

Mexico	2–0	Bulgaria
Negrete 34'; Servín 61'

Estadio Azteca, Mexico City
Attendance: 114,580
Referee: Romualdo Arppi Filho (Brazil)

15 June 1986
16:00 CST

Soviet Union	3–4 (a.e.t.)	Belgium
Belanov 27', 70', 111' (pen.)		Scifo 56'; Ceulemans 77'; Demol 102'; Claesen 110'

Estadio Nou Camp, León
Attendance: 32,277
Referee: Erik Fredriksson (Sweden)

16 June 1986
12:00 CST

Brazil	4–0	Poland
Sócrates 30' (pen.); Josimar 55'; Edinho 79'; Careca 83' (pen.)

Estadio Jalisco, Guadalajara
Attendance: 45,000
Referee: Volker Roth (West Germany)

16 June 1986
16:00 CST

Argentina	1–0	Uruguay
Pasculli 42'

Estadio Cuauhtémoc, Puebla
Attendance: 26,000
Referee: Luigi Agnolin (Italy)

17 June 1986
12:00 CST

Italy	0–2	France
		Platini 15'; Stopyra 57'

Estadio Olímpico Universitario, Mexico City
Attendance: 70,000
Referee: Carlos Espósito (Argentina)

17 June 1986
16:00 CST

Morocco	0–1	West Germany
		Matthäus 88'

Estadio Universitario, San Nicolás de los Garza
Attendance: 19,800
Referee: Zoran Petrović (Yugoslavia)

18 June 1986
12:00 CST

England	3–0	Paraguay
Lineker 31', 73'; Beardsley 56'

Estadio Azteca, Mexico City
Attendance: 98,728
Referee: Jamal Al Sharif (Syria)

18 June 1986
16:00 CST

Denmark	1–5	Spain
J. Olsen 33' (pen.)		Butragueño 43', 56', 80', 88' (pen.); Goikoetxea 68' (pen.)

Estadio La Corregidora, Querétaro
Attendance: 38,500
Referee: Jan Keizer (Netherlands)

=== Quarter-finals ===
21 June 1986
12:00 CST

Brazil	1–1 (a.e.t.)	France
Careca 17'		Platini 40'
Penalties
Sócrates (penalty missed); Alemão (penalty scored); Zico (penalty scored); Branco (penalty scored); Júlio César (penalty missed)	3–4	(penalty scored) Stopyra; (penalty scored) Amoros; (penalty scored) Bellone; (penalty missed) Platini; (penalty scored) Fernández

Estadio Jalisco, Guadalajara
Attendance: 65,000
Referee: Ioan Igna (Romania)

21 June 1986
16:00 CST

West Germany	0–0 (a.e.t.)	Mexico
Penalties
Allofs (penalty scored); Brehme (penalty scored); Matthäus (penalty scored); Littbarski (penalty scored)	4–1	(penalty scored) Negrete; (penalty missed) Quirarte; (penalty missed) Servín

Estadio Universitario, San Nicolás de los Garza
Attendance: 41,700
Referee: Jesús Díaz (Colombia)

22 June 1986
12:00 CST

Argentina	2–1	England
Maradona 51', 55'		Lineker 81'

Estadio Azteca, Mexico City
Attendance: 114,580
Referee: Ali Bin Nasser (Tunisia)

22 June 1986
16:00 CST

Spain	1–1 (a.e.t.)	Belgium
Señor 85'		Ceulemans 35'
Penalties
Señor (penalty scored); Eloy (penalty missed); Chendo (penalty scored); Butragueño (penalty scored); Víctor (penalty scored)	4–5	(penalty scored) Claesen; (penalty scored) Scifo; (penalty scored) Broos; (penalty scored) Vervoort; (penalty scored) L. Van der Elst

Estadio Cuauhtémoc, Puebla
Attendance: 45,000
Referee: Siegfried Kirschen (East Germany)

=== Semi-finals ===
25 June 1986
12:00 CST

France	0–2	West Germany
		Brehme 9'; Völler 90'

Estadio Jalisco, Guadalajara
Attendance: 45,000
Referee: Luigi Agnolin (Italy)

25 June 1986
16:00 CST

Argentina	2–0	Belgium
Maradona 51', 63'

Estadio Azteca, Mexico City
Attendance: 114,500
Referee: Antonio Márquez Ramírez (Mexico)

=== Match for third place ===
28 June 1986
12:00 CST

Belgium	2–4 (a.e.t.)	France
Ceulemans 11'; Claesen 73'		Ferreri 27'; Papin 43'; Genghini 104'; Amoros 111' (pen.)

Estadio Cuauhtémoc, Puebla
Attendance: 21,000
Referee: George Courtney (England)

=== Final ===
29 June 1986
12:00 CST

Argentina	3–2	West Germany
Brown 23'; Valdano 56'; Burruchaga 84'		Rummenigge 74'; Völler 81'

Estadio Azteca, Mexico City
Attendance: 114,600
Referee: Romualdo Arppi Filho (Brazil)

== Statistics ==
=== Goalscorers ===
Gary Lineker received the Golden Boot for scoring six goals. In total, 132 goals were scored by 82 players, with two of them credited as own goals.

6 goals

- (England) Gary Lineker

5 goals

- (Argentina) Diego Maradona
- (Brazil) Careca
- (Spain) Emilio Butragueño

4 goals

- (Argentina) Jorge Valdano
- (Denmark) Preben Elkjær
- (Italy) Alessandro Altobelli
- (Soviet Union) Igor Belanov

3 goals

- (Belgium) Jan Ceulemans
- (Belgium) Nico Claesen
- (Denmark) Jesper Olsen
- (West Germany) Rudi Völler

2 goals

- (Argentina) Jorge Burruchaga
- (Belgium) Enzo Scifo
- (Brazil) Josimar
- (Brazil) Sócrates
- (France) Jean-Pierre Papin
- (France) Michel Platini
- (France) Yannick Stopyra
- (Mexico) Fernando Quirarte
- (Morocco) Abderrazak Khairi
- (Paraguay) Roberto Cabañas
- (Paraguay) Romerito
- (Spain) Ramón Calderé
- (West Germany) Klaus Allofs

1 goal

- (Algeria) Djamel Zidane
- (Argentina) José Luis Brown
- (Argentina) Pedro Pasculli
- (Argentina) Oscar Ruggeri
- (Belgium) Stéphane Demol
- (Belgium) Erwin Vandenbergh
- (Belgium) Franky Vercauteren
- (Belgium) Daniel Veyt
- (Brazil) Edinho
- (Bulgaria) Plamen Getov
- (Bulgaria) Nasko Sirakov
- (Denmark) John Eriksen
- (Denmark) Michael Laudrup
- (Denmark) Søren Lerby
- (England) Peter Beardsley
- (France) Manuel Amoros
- (France) Luis Fernández
- (France) Jean-Marc Ferreri
- (France) Bernard Genghini
- (France) Dominique Rocheteau
- (France) Jean Tigana
- (Hungary) Lajos Détári
- (Hungary) Márton Esterházy
- (Iraq) Ahmed Radhi
- (Mexico) Luis Flores
- (Mexico) Manuel Negrete
- (Mexico) Hugo Sánchez
- (Mexico) Raúl Servín
- (Morocco) Abdelkrim Merry
- (Northern Ireland) Colin Clarke
- (Northern Ireland) Norman Whiteside
- (Poland) Włodzimierz Smolarek
- (Portugal) Carlos Manuel
- (Portugal) Diamantino
- (Scotland) Gordon Strachan
- (South Korea) Choi Soon-ho
- (South Korea) Huh Jung-moo
- (South Korea) Kim Jong-boo
- (South Korea) Park Chang-sun
- (Soviet Union) Sergei Aleinikov
- (Soviet Union) Oleh Blokhin
- (Soviet Union) Vasyl Rats
- (Soviet Union) Sergey Rodionov
- (Soviet Union) Pavlo Yakovenko
- (Soviet Union) Ivan Yaremchuk
- (Soviet Union) Oleksandr Zavarov
- (Spain) Eloy
- (Spain) Andoni Goikoetxea
- (Spain) Julio Salinas
- (Spain) Juan Señor
- (Uruguay) Antonio Alzamendi
- (Uruguay) Enzo Francescoli
- (West Germany) Andreas Brehme
- (West Germany) Lothar Matthäus
- (West Germany) Karl-Heinz Rummenigge

Own goals

- (Hungary) László Dajka (against the Soviet Union)
- (South Korea) Cho Kwang-rae (against Italy)

=== Awards ===
Golden Boot	Best Young Player	FIFA Fair Play Trophy
(England) Gary Lineker	(Belgium) Enzo Scifo	Brazil

Golden Ball
Rank	Player	Points
1	(Argentina) Diego Maradona	1282
2	(West Germany) Toni Schumacher	344
3	(Denmark) Preben Elkjær	236
4	(Belgium) Jean-Marie Pfaff	224
4	(France) Michel Platini	224
6	(England) Gary Lineker	200
7	(France) Manuel Amoros	168
8	(Spain) Emilio Butragueño	156
9	(France) Jean Tigana	124
10	(Brazil) Júlio César	110

=== Team of the Tournament ===
FIFA selected the following players for the 1986 FIFA World Cup All-Star Team.

Goalkeeper	Defenders	Midfielders	Forwards
(Belgium) Jean-Marie Pfaff	(France) Manuel Amoros (Brazil) Júlio César (Brazil) Josimar	(Belgium) Jan Ceulemans (France) Jean Tigana (France) Michel Platini (Argentina) Diego Maradona	(Denmark) Preben Elkjær (Spain) Emilio Butragueño (England) Gary Lineker

=== Red cards ===
Eight players received a red card during the tournament:

- (Canada) Mike Sweeney
- (Denmark) Frank Arnesen
- (England) Ray Wilkins
- (West Germany) Thomas Berthold
- (Iraq) Basil Gorgis
- (Mexico) Javier Aguirre
- (Uruguay) José Batista
- (Uruguay) Miguel Bossio

=== Tournament ranking ===
In 1986, FIFA published a report that ranked all teams in each World Cup up to and including 1986, based on progress in the competition and overall results. The rankings for the 1986 tournament were as follows:

Per statistical convention in football, matches decided in extra time are counted as wins and losses, while matches decided by penalty shoot-outs are counted as draws.

Pos	Grp	Team	Pld	W	D	L	GF	GA	GD	Pts	Final result
1	A	Argentina	7	6	1	0	14	5	+9	13	Champions
2	E	West Germany	7	3	2	2	8	7	+1	8	Runners-up
3	C	France	7	4	2	1	12	6	+6	10	Third place
4	B	Belgium	7	2	2	3	12	15	−3	6	Fourth place
5	D	Brazil	5	4	1	0	10	1	+9	9	Eliminated in quarter-finals
6	B	Mexico (H)	5	3	2	0	6	2	+4	8	Eliminated in quarter-finals
7	D	Spain	5	3	1	1	11	4	+7	7	Eliminated in quarter-finals
8	F	England	5	2	1	2	7	3	+4	5	Eliminated in quarter-finals
9	E	Denmark	4	3	0	1	10	6	+4	6	Eliminated in round of 16
10	C	Soviet Union	4	2	1	1	12	5	+7	5	Eliminated in round of 16
11	F	Morocco	4	1	2	1	3	2	+1	4	Eliminated in round of 16
12	A	Italy	4	1	2	1	5	6	−1	4	Eliminated in round of 16
13	B	Paraguay	4	1	2	1	4	6	−2	4	Eliminated in round of 16
14	F	Poland	4	1	1	2	1	7	−6	3	Eliminated in round of 16
15	A	Bulgaria	4	0	2	2	2	6	−4	2	Eliminated in round of 16
16	E	Uruguay	4	0	2	2	2	8	−6	2	Eliminated in round of 16
17	F	Portugal	3	1	0	2	2	4	−2	2	Eliminated in group stage
18	C	Hungary	3	1	0	2	2	9	−7	2	Eliminated in group stage
19	E	Scotland	3	0	1	2	1	3	−2	1	Eliminated in group stage
20	A	South Korea	3	0	1	2	4	7	−3	1	Eliminated in group stage
21	D	Northern Ireland	3	0	1	2	2	6	−4	1	Eliminated in group stage
22	D	Algeria	3	0	1	2	1	5	−4	1	Eliminated in group stage
23	B	Iraq	3	0	0	3	1	4	−3	0	Eliminated in group stage
24	C	Canada	3	0	0	3	0	5	−5	0	Eliminated in group stage

Source: FIFA
(H) Hosts

== Marketing ==
=== Sponsorship ===
The sponsors of the 1986 FIFA World Cup consisted out of 15 FIFA World Cup sponsors.

FIFA World Cup sponsors
- Arena Swimwear
- Bata
- Budweiser
- R.J. Reynolds (Camel)
- Canon
- Cinzano
- Coca-Cola
- Fujifilm
- Gillette
- JVC
- LuK Kupplung
- Opel
- Philips
- Seiko
- Sport Billy

== Symbols ==
=== Mascot ===
Pique, official mascot

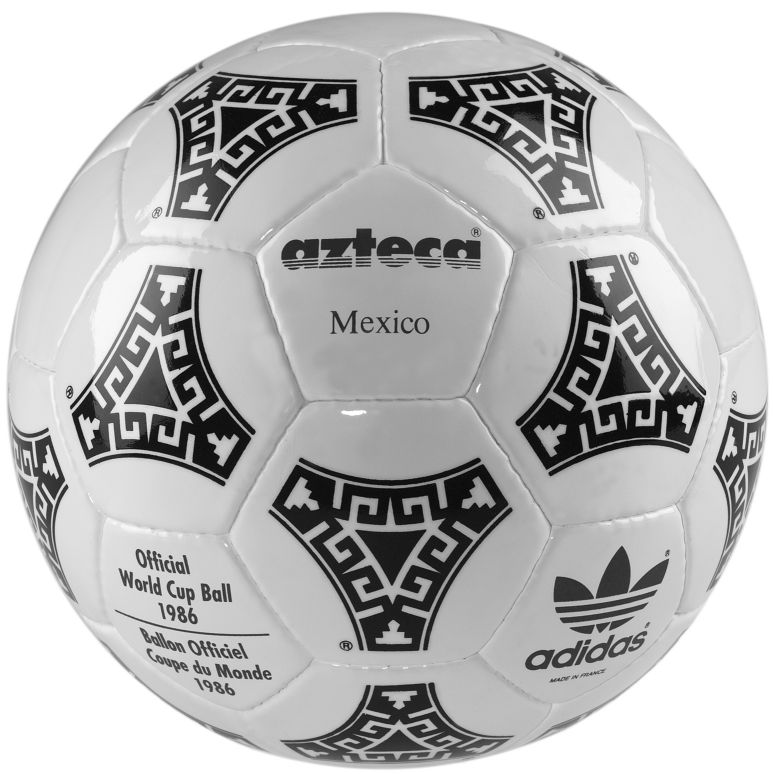
Adidas Azteca, official ball

The official mascot of the 1986 World Cup was Pique, a jalapeño pepper, characteristic of Mexican cuisine, with a moustache, a Colimote sombrero, and Mexican football team colours. Its name comes from picante, a Spanish word meaning "spicy", and was also a pun on the "PK" abbreviation of the football term penalty kick. Pique is also a common Spanish name.

The character caused a degree of controversy within Mexico for its ethnic stereotypes.

=== Match ball ===
The official match ball of this World Cup was the "Azteca", manufactured by Adidas. It was the first fully synthetic FIFA World Cup ball and the elaborately decorated design was inspired by the hosting nation's native Aztec architecture and murals.

=== Music ===
The official song of this World Cup was El mundo unido por un balón ("the world united by a ball"), performed by Chilean artist Juan Carlos Abara.
