= 1983 Copa América squads =

List of footballera

The following is a list of squads of the countries that played in the 1983 Copa América. The first round was played in three groups of three teams with Paraguay entering directly to the semi-finals as title holder.

Argentina called up footballers playing in Argentine clubs only.

== Group A ==
=== Chile ===
Coach: Chile Luis Ibarra

No.	Pos.	Player	Date of birth (age)	Caps	Club
1	GK	Roberto Rojas	8 August 1957 (aged 26)		(Chile) Colo-Colo
12	GK	Marco Cornez	15 October 1957 (aged 25)		(Chile) Palestino
2	DF	Rubén Espinoza	1 June 1961 (aged 22)		(Chile) Universidad Católica
6	DF	Rodolfo Dubó	11 September 1953 (aged 29)		Universidad de Chile
4	DF	Juan Soto	25 June 1953 (aged 30)		(Chile) Palestino
14	DF	René Valenzuela	20 April 1955 (aged 28)		(Chile) Universidad Católica
23	MF	Alejandro Hisis	16 February 1962 (aged 21)		(Chile) Colo-Colo
11	MF	Leonel Herrera	10 October 1948 (aged 34)		(Chile) Colo-Colo
15	MF	Marcelo Pacheco	18 March 1958 (aged 25)		(Chile) Deportes Naval
7	MF	Luis Silvio Rojas	5 April 1954 (aged 29)		(Chile) Unión Española
22	MF	Juan Carlos Orellana	21 June 1955 (aged 28)		(Chile) O'Higgins
10	FW	Jorge Aravena	22 April 1958 (aged 25)		(Chile) Universidad Católica
19	FW	Óscar Arriaza			(Chile) Deportes Naval
9	FW	Óscar Herrera	3 January 1959 (aged 24)		(Chile) Deportes Naval
18	FW	Osvaldo Hurtado	2 November 1957 (aged 25)		(Chile) Universidad Católica
17	FW	Juan Carlos Letelier	20 May 1959 (aged 24)		(Chile) Cobreloa
21	MF	Juan Rojas	7 August 1957 (aged 26)		(Chile) O'Higgins

=== Uruguay ===
Head Coach: (Uruguay) Omar Borrás

No.	Pos.	Player	Date of birth (age)	Caps	Club
1	GK	Rodolfo Rodríguez	20 January 1956 (aged 27)		(Uruguay) Nacional
2	DF	Walter Olivera	16 August 1952 (aged 30)		(Brazil) Atlético Mineiro
3	DF	Nelson Gutiérrez	13 April 1962 (aged 21)		(Uruguay) Peñarol
4	DF	Néstor Montelongo	20 February 1955 (aged 28)		(Uruguay) Peñarol
5	MF	Nelson Agresta	2 August 1955 (aged 28)		(Uruguay) Nacional
6	DF	Washington González	6 December 1955 (aged 27)		(Uruguay) Nacional
7	FW	Luis Alberto Acosta	15 December 1959 (aged 23)		(Uruguay) Wanderers
8	MF	Jorge Barrios	24 January 1961 (aged 22)		(Uruguay) Wanderers
9	FW	Venancio Ramos	20 June 1959 (aged 24)		(Uruguay) Peñarol
10	FW	Arsenio Luzardo	4 September 1959 (aged 23)		(Uruguay) Nacional
11	FW	Wilmar Cabrera	31 July 1959 (aged 24)		(Uruguay) Nacional
12	GK	José Luis Sosa	1 January 1956 (aged 27)		(Uruguay) Nacional
13	DF	Eduardo Acevedo	25 September 1959 (aged 23)		(Uruguay) Defensor
14	DF	Víctor Diogo	9 April 1958 (aged 25)		(Uruguay) Peñarol
15	MF	Mario Saralegui	24 April 1959 (aged 24)		(Uruguay) Peñarol
16	FW	Carlos Aguilera	21 September 1964 (aged 18)		(Uruguay) Nacional
17	DF	Raúl Esnal	23 April 1956 (aged 27)		(Uruguay) Wanderers
18	MF	Miguel Bossio	10 February 1960 (aged 23)		(Uruguay) Peñarol
19	MF	Víctor Rabuñal	8 January 1962 (aged 21)		(Uruguay) Bella Vista
20	MF	Carlos Vásquez	12 March 1962 (aged 21)		(Uruguay) Bella Vista
21	FW	Antonio Alzamendi	7 June 1956 (aged 27)		(Uruguay) Nacional
22	GK	Gustavo Fernández	16 February 1952 (aged 31)		(Uruguay) Peñarol
23	FW	Alfredo de los Santos	12 February 1956 (aged 27)		(Uruguay) Defensor
24	FW	Enzo Francéscoli	12 November 1961 (aged 21)		(Argentina) River Plate
25	FW	Alberto Santelli	14 June 1963 (aged 20)		(Uruguay) Defensor
26	GK	Julio Acuña	11 December 1954 (aged 28)		(Uruguay) Defensor
27	FW	Juan Muhlethaler	17 December 1954 (aged 28)		(Uruguay) Rampla Juniors
28	DF	Eliseo Rivero	27 December 1957 (aged 25)		(Uruguay) Danubio
29	MF	Jorge Villazán	5 October 1962 (aged 20)		(Uruguay) Nacional
30	FW	Juan Ferrari	1 January 1965 (aged 18)		(Uruguay) Nacional
31	FW	Fernando Morena	2 February 1952 (aged 31)		(Uruguay) Peñarol

=== Venezuela ===
Head Coach: (Uruguay) Walter Roque

No.	Pos.	Player	Date of birth (age)	Caps	Club
1	GK	César Renato Baena	13 January 1961 (aged 22)		(Venezuela) Caracas
12	GK	Daniel Nikolac	11 May 1961 (aged 22)		(Venezuela) Mineros
21	GK	Vicente Vega	21 February 1955 (aged 28)		(Venezuela) Portuguesa FC
2	DF	Pedro Javier Acosta	7 September 1959 (aged 23)		(Venezuela) Deportivo Portugués
25	MF	Julio Barboza	5 November 1954 (aged 28)		(Venezuela) Deportivo Táchira
3	DF	Carlos Betancourt	10 November 1957 (aged 25)		(Venezuela) Atlético Zamora
6	DF	Johnny Castellanos	24 December 1957 (aged 25)		(Venezuela) Atlético Zamora
8	DF	Roberto Elie	11 May 1959 (aged 24)		(Venezuela) Universidad de Los Andes
14	MF	Alberto Ramos Cabrera	16 September 1956 (aged 26)		(Venezuela) Deportivo Italia
24	DF	Oscar Torres	29 May 1959 (aged 24)		(Venezuela) Estudiantes de Mérida
19	DF	René Torres	13 October 1960 (aged 22)		(Venezuela) Universidad de Los Andes
4	MF	Braulen Barboza	11 May 1955 (aged 28)		(Venezuela) Atlético San Cristóbal
7	FW	Nelson Carrero	3 February 1953 (aged 30)		(Venezuela) Universidad de Los Andes
5	MF	Douglas Cedeño	11 February 1960 (aged 23)		(Venezuela) Mineros
11	MF	José Milillo	17 November 1961 (aged 21)		(Venezuela) Estudiantes de Mérida
18	MF	Carlos Pérez			(Venezuela) Colegio San Agustín
15	MF	José Rodríguez	4 April 1961 (aged 22)		(Venezuela) Deportivo Lara
22	MF	Asdrúbal Sánchez	1 April 1958 (aged 25)		(Venezuela) Universidad de Los Andes
13	MF	Nicola Simonelli	20 January 1958 (aged 25)		(Venezuela) Atlético San Cristóbal
10	FW	Rodolfo Carvajal	8 February 1952 (aged 31)		(Venezuela) Universidad de Los Andes
9	FW	Pedro Febles	18 April 1958 (aged 25)		(Venezuela) Atlético San Cristóbal
23	FW	Ildemaro Fernández	27 December 1961 (aged 21)		(Venezuela) Estudiantes de Mérida
16	FW	José Gamboa	23 June 1961 (aged 22)		(Venezuela) Estudiantes de Mérida
17	FW	Franco Rizzi	13 July 1964 (aged 19)		(Venezuela) Deportivo Portugués
20	MF	William Alfonso Urdaneta	9 September 1961 (aged 21)		(Venezuela) Deportivo Lara

== Group B ==
=== Argentina ===
Head Coach: (Argentina) Carlos Bilardo

No.	Pos.	Player	Date of birth (age)	Caps	Club
1	GK	Nery Pumpido	30 July 1957 (aged 26)		(Argentina) River Plate
2	DF	Julián Camino	2 May 1961 (aged 22)		(Argentina) Estudiantes LP
3	DF	Enzo Trossero	23 May 1953 (aged 30)		(Argentina) Independiente
4	DF	Omar Jorge^{1}	30 August 1956 (aged 26)		(Argentina) Vélez Sarsfield
5	DF	Oscar Garré	9 December 1956 (aged 26)		(Argentina) Ferro C. Oeste
6	DF	José Luis Brown	10 November 1956 (aged 26)		(Argentina) Estudiantes LP
7	FW	Víctor Ramos	4 September 1958 (aged 24)		(Argentina) Newell's
8	MF	Claudio Marangoni	17 November 1954 (aged 28)		(Argentina) Independiente
9	FW	Ricardo Gareca	10 February 1958 (aged 25)		(Argentina) Boca Juniors
10	MF	Alejandro Sabella	5 November 1954 (aged 28)		(Argentina) Estudiantes LP
11	MF	Jorge Rinaldi	23 March 1963 (aged 20)		(Argentina) San Lorenzo
12	GK	Juan Carlos Delménico	9 December 1953 (aged 29)		(Argentina) Instituto (C)
13	DF	Néstor Clausen	29 September 1962 (aged 20)		(Argentina) Independiente
14	MF	Miguel Ángel Russo	9 April 1956 (aged 27)		(Argentina) Estudiantes LP
15	DF	Héctor Cúper	16 November 1955 (aged 27)		(Argentina) Ferro C. Oeste
16	MF	Ricardo Giusti	11 December 1956 (aged 26)		(Argentina) Independiente
17	GK	Ubaldo Fillol	21 July 1950 (aged 33)		(Argentina) Argentinos Juniors
18	FW	Luis Amuchástegui	12 December 1960 (aged 22)		(Argentina) Racing (C)
19	DF	Juan Bujedo	6 March 1956 (aged 27)		(Argentina) Vélez Sarsfield
20	FW	Alberto Márcico	13 May 1960 (aged 23)		(Argentina) Ferro C. Oeste
21	MF	Jorge Burruchaga	9 October 1962 (aged 20)		(Argentina) Independiente
22	MF	José Daniel Ponce	26 June 1962 (aged 21)		(Argentina) Estudiantes LP
23	MF	Marcelo Trobbiani	17 February 1955 (aged 28)		(Argentina) Estudiantes LP
24	MF	Julio Olarticoechea	18 October 1958 (aged 24)		(Argentina) River Plate
25	MF	Rubén Insúa	17 April 1961 (aged 22)		(Argentina) San Lorenzo

No.	Pos.	Player	Date of birth (age)	Caps	Club
4	DF	Roberto Mouzo^{1}	8 January 1953 (aged 30)		(Argentina) Boca Juniors

^{1} replacements

=== Ecuador ===
Head Coach: (Ecuador) Ernesto Guerra

No.	Pos.	Player	Date of birth (age)	Caps	Club
	GK	Carlos Omar Delgado	7 February 1949 (aged 34)		(Ecuador) El Nacional
	GK	Milton Vicente Rodríguez	9 July 1954 (aged 29)		(Ecuador) El Nacional
	GK	Israel Rodríguez	16 November 1960 (aged 22)		(Ecuador) Emelec
	DF	Wilson Armas	2 April 1958 (aged 25)		(Ecuador) El Nacional
	DF	Alfredo Encalada	4 September 1957 (aged 25)		(Ecuador) Deportivo Quito
	DF	Orly Klínger	10 October 1956 (aged 26)		(Ecuador) LDU Portoviejo
	DF	Hans Maldonado	25 June 1956 (aged 27)		(Ecuador) El Nacional
	DF	Orlando Narváez	26 June 1958 (aged 25)		(Ecuador) El Nacional
	DF	Pedro Proaño	31 January 1958 (aged 25)		(Ecuador) El Nacional
	MF	Luis Granda	2 July 1955 (aged 28)		(Ecuador) El Nacional
	MF	Tulio Quinteros	4 May 1963 (aged 20)		(Ecuador) Barcelona
	MF	Carlos Ron	16 December 1953 (aged 29)		(Ecuador) El Nacional
	MF	Bolívar Ruiz	29 April 1958 (aged 25)		(Ecuador) LDU Quito
	MF	Galo Vásquez	31 December 1957 (aged 25)		(Ecuador) Barcelona
	MF	José Vega	27 November 1958 (aged 24)		(Ecuador) Barcelona
	MF	José Villafuerte	28 October 1956 (aged 26)		(Ecuador) El Nacional
	FW	Polo Carrera	11 January 1945 (aged 38)		(Ecuador) Deportivo Quito
	FW	Hamilton Cuvi	5 August 1960 (aged 23)		(Ecuador) Nueve de Octubre
	FW	Carlos Gorozabel	8 October 1956 (aged 26)		(Ecuador) LDU Quito
	FW	José Moreno	25 May 1962 (aged 21)		(Ecuador) América
	FW	Lupo Quiñónez	12 February 1957 (aged 26)		(Ecuador) Manta SC
	FW	Jorge Ron	26 February 1954 (aged 29)		(Ecuador) Universidad Católica
	FW	Mario Tenorio	21 August 1957 (aged 25)		(Ecuador) Barcelona

=== Brazil ===
Head Coach: (Brazil) Carlos Alberto Parreira

No.	Pos.	Player	Date of birth (age)	Caps	Club
1	GK	Leão	11 July 1949 (aged 34)		(Brazil) Corinthians
2	DF	Leandro	17 March 1958 (aged 25)		(Brazil) Flamengo
3	DF	Márcio	20 September 1960 (aged 23)		(Brazil) Santos
4	DF	Mozer	19 September 1960 (aged 23)		(Brazil) Flamengo
5	MF	Andrade	21 April 1957 (aged 26)		(Brazil) Flamengo
6	DF	Júnior	29 June 1954 (aged 29)		(Brazil) Flamengo
7	FW	Renato Gaúcho	9 September 1962 (aged 21)		(Brazil) Grêmio
8	MF	Sócrates	19 February 1954 (aged 29)		(Brazil) Corinthians
9	FW	Roberto Dinamite	13 April 1954 (aged 29)		(Brazil) Vasco da Gama
10	FW	Tita	1 April 1958 (aged 25)		(Brazil) Flamengo
11	MF	Jorginho	23 August 1958 (aged 25)		(Brazil) Palmeiras
12	GK	João Marcos	1 September 1953 (aged 30)		(Brazil) Palmeiras
13	DF	Paulo Roberto	27 January 1963 (aged 20)		(Brazil) Grêmio
14	DF	Toninho Carlos	17 May 1963 (aged 20)		(Brazil) Santos
15	DF	Wladimir	29 August 1954 (aged 29)		(Brazil) Corinthians
16	MF	China	13 September 1959 (aged 24)		(Brazil) Grêmio
17	MF	Renato	21 February 1957 (aged 26)		(Brazil) São Paulo
18	FW	Careca	5 October 1960 (aged 23)		(Brazil) São Paulo
19	FW	Éder	25 May 1957 (aged 26)		(Brazil) Atlético Mineiro
20	DF	Leiz	27 June 1958 (aged 25)		(Brazil) Portuguesa
21	FW	João Paulo	15 June 1957 (aged 26)		(Brazil) Santos
22	GK	Acácio	20 January 1958 (aged 25)		(Brazil) Vasco da Gama
23	FW	Geraldo Touro	3 February 1958 (aged 25)		(Brazil) Botafogo
24	MF	Mendonça	23 May 1956 (aged 27)		(Brazil) Botafogo
25	MF	Douglas	1 March 1963 (aged 20)		(Brazil) Cruzeiro

== Group C ==
=== Bolivia ===
Coach: (Bolivia) Wilfredo Camacho

No.	Pos.	Player	Date of birth (age)	Caps	Club
	GK	Eduardo Terrazas	6 March 1962 (aged 21)		(Bolivia) Blooming
	DF	Carlos Arias Torrico	26 August 1956 (aged 26)		(Bolivia) Bolivar
	DF	Rolando Coimbra	25 February 1960 (aged 23)		(Bolivia) Guabirá
	DF	Roberto Pérez	17 April 1960 (aged 23)		(Bolivia) Guabirá
	DF	Carlos Urizar	16 January 1957 (aged 26)		(Bolivia) Bolivar
	MF	Aldo Fierro	19 June 1954 (aged 29)		(Bolivia) Bolivar
	MF	Edgar Vaca	2 May 1956 (aged 27)		(Bolivia) Guabirá
	MF	Ramiro Vargas	22 October 1958 (aged 24)		(Bolivia) Bolivar
	MF	Jorge Camacho	13 March 1956 (aged 27)		(Bolivia) Club Petrolero
	MF	Carlos Fernando Borja	25 December 1956 (aged 26)		(Bolivia) Bolivar
	MF	Edgar Castillo	16 February 1956 (aged 27)		(Bolivia) Blooming
	MF	José Milton Melgar	20 September 1959 (aged 23)		(Bolivia) Blooming
	MF	Erwin Romero	27 September 1959 (aged 23)		(Bolivia) Blooming
	MF	Johnny Villarroel	5 April 1955 (aged 28)		(Bolivia) Jorge Wilstermann
	MF	Miguel Aguilar	29 September 1953 (aged 29)		(Bolivia) Oriente Petrolero
	FW	Ovidio Messa	12 December 1952 (aged 30)		(Bolivia) The Strongest
	FW	Silvio Rojas	3 November 1959 (aged 23)		(Bolivia) Blooming
	FW	Fernando Salinas	18 May 1960 (aged 23)		(Bolivia) Bolivar

=== Colombia ===
Head Coach: (Colombia) Efraín Sánchez

No.	Pos.	Player	Date of birth (age)	Caps	Club
	GK	James Mina	17 July 1954 (aged 29)		(Colombia) Independiente Santa Fe
	GK	Pedro Zape	3 June 1949 (aged 34)		(Colombia) Deportivo Cali
	DF	Pedro Blanco	28 June 1958 (aged 25)		(Colombia) Atlético Junior
	DF	Oscar Bolaño	14 April 1951 (aged 32)		(Colombia) Atlético Junior
	DF	Álvaro Escobar	16 May 1955 (aged 28)		(Colombia) Independiente Medellín
	DF	Carlos Hoyos	28 April 1962 (aged 21)		(Colombia) Deportivo Cali
	DF	Nolberto Molina	5 January 1953 (aged 30)		(Colombia) Millonarios
	DF	Víctor Luna	27 October 1959 (aged 23)		(Colombia) Atletico Nacional
	DF	Miguel Prince	30 July 1957 (aged 26)		(Colombia) Millonarios
	MF	Henry Viáfara	20 April 1953 (aged 30)		(Colombia) América de Cali
	MF	Juan Caicedo	8 March 1955 (aged 28)		(Colombia) América de Cali
	MF	Ernesto Díaz	13 December 1952 (aged 30)		(Colombia) Millonarios
	MF	Hernán Darío Herrera	28 October 1957 (aged 25)		(Colombia) América de Cali
	MF	Willington Ortiz	26 March 1952 (aged 31)		(Colombia) Millonarios
	MF	Norberto Peluffo	26 June 1958 (aged 25)		(Colombia) Atlético Nacional
	MF	Pedro Sarmiento	26 October 1956 (aged 26)		(Colombia) Atlético Nacional
	FW	Antony de Ávila	30 December 1963 (aged 19)		(Colombia) América de Cali
	FW	Jesús Barrios	10 January 1961 (aged 22)		(Colombia) Atlético Junior
	FW	Fernando Fiorillo	23 November 1956 (aged 26)		(Colombia) Atlético Junior
	FW	Arnoldo Iguarán	18 January 1957 (aged 26)		(Colombia) Millonarios
	FW	Alex Valderrama	1 October 1960 (aged 22)		(Colombia) Unión Magdalena

=== Peru ===
Coach: Juan José Tan

No.	Pos.	Player	Date of birth (age)	Caps	Club
1	GK	Eusebio Acasuzo	8 April 1952 (aged 31)		(Peru) Universitario
2	DF	José Aguayo	25 October 1955 (aged 27)		(Peru) Melgar
3	DF	Rubén Toribio Díaz	17 April 1952 (aged 31)		(Peru) Sporting Cristal
4	DF	Raúl García	21 September 1959 (aged 23)		(Peru) Universitario
5	MF	José Casanova	12 May 1964 (aged 19)		(Peru) Alianza Lima
6	DF	Jaime Duarte	27 February 1955 (aged 28)		(Peru) Alianza Lima
7	FW	Genaro Neyra	8 October 1952 (aged 30)		(Peru) Melgar
8	MF	Luis Reyna	16 May 1959 (aged 24)		(Peru) Sporting Cristal
9	FW	Franco Navarro	10 November 1961 (aged 21)		(Peru) Sporting Cristal
11	MF	Pedro Requena	29 June 1961 (aged 22)		(Peru) Sport Boys
12	GK	Enrique Bravo Cóndor	1955 (aged 27–28)		(Peru) Deportivo Municipal
13	MF	Germán Leguía	2 January 1954 (aged 29)		(Peru) Universitario
14	FW	Alberto Mora	21 December 1959 (aged 23)		(Peru) Sporting Cristal
15	MF	Pedro Bonelli	20 October 1956 (aged 26)		(Peru) Deportivo Municipal
16	DF	Jorge Ramírez	22 October 1955 (aged 27)		(Peru) Melgar
17	FW	Eduardo Rey Muñoz	7 August 1957 (aged 26)		(Peru) Universitario
18	MF	Roberto Rojas	26 October 1955 (aged 27)		(Peru) Alianza Lima
19	FW	Juan Caballero	27 June 1958 (aged 25)		(Peru) Sporting Cristal
20	MF	José Velásquez	4 June 1954 (aged 29)		(Colombia) Independiente Medellin
22	FW	Eduardo Malásquez	19 October 1957 (aged 25)		(Colombia) Independiente Medellin
23	MF	Jorge Olaechea	27 August 1958 (aged 24)		(Peru) Alianza Lima

== Semi-final ==
=== Paraguay ===
Head Coach: (Paraguay) Ramón Julián Rodríguez

No.	Pos.	Player	Date of birth (age)	Caps	Club
1	GK	Roberto Fernández	9 July 1954 (aged 29)		(Paraguay) Cerro Porteño
2	MF	Dario Figueredo	7 February 1957 (aged 26)		(Paraguay) Cerro Porteño
3	DF	Rogelio Delgado	12 October 1959 (aged 23)		(Paraguay) Club Olimpia
4	DF	Juan Torales	9 March 1956 (aged 27)		(Paraguay) Club Libertad
5	DF	Oscar Surián	7 August 1959 (aged 24)		(Paraguay) Club Libertad
6	DF	Gustavo Benítez	5 February 1953 (aged 30)		(Paraguay) Club Olimpia
7	FW	Ramón Hicks	30 May 1959 (aged 24)		(Paraguay) Club Libertad
9	FW	Milcíades Morel	9 September 1953 (aged 29)		(Paraguay) Sportivo Luqueño
8	DF	Vladimiro Schettina	8 October 1955 (aged 27)		(Paraguay) Guarani
10	MF	Aldo Florentín	10 November 1957 (aged 25)		(Paraguay) Cerro Porteño
11	FW	Alfredo Mendoza	31 December 1963 (aged 19)		(Paraguay) Cerro Porteño
12	GK	Jacinto Rodríguez	5 December 1958 (aged 24)		(Paraguay) River Plate
13	DF	Justo Jacquet	9 September 1961 (aged 21)		(Paraguay) Cerro Porteño
14	DF	Carlos César Olmedo	18 June 1960 (aged 23)		(Paraguay) Sportivo Luqueño
16	MF	Pedro Garay	19 October 1961 (aged 21)		(Paraguay) Club Sol de América
17	MF	Fidel Miño	24 April 1957 (aged 26)		(Paraguay) Club Nacional
18	FW	Roberto Cabañas	11 April 1961 (aged 22)		(United States) New York Cosmos
15	FW	Romerito	28 August 1960 (aged 22)		(United States) New York Cosmos
