= 1983 Copa América final =

- Event: 1983 Copa América
| Uruguay | Brazil |
- Uruguay won 3–1 on points

First leg
| Uruguay | Brazil |
| 2 | 0 |
- Date: October 27, 1983
- Venue: Estadio Centenario, Montevideo
- Referee: Héctor Ortiz (Paraguay)
- Attendance: 65,000

Second leg
| Brazil | Uruguay |
| 1 | 1 |
- Date: November 4, 1983
- Venue: Estádio Fonte Nova, Salvador
- Referee: Edison Pérez (Peru)
- Attendance: 95,000

The 1983 Copa América final was the final match to determine the champion of the 1983 Copa América, the 32nd. edition of this continental competition. The final was played in the two-legged tie system, with the team earning more points being the champion. The first leg was held on October 27 in Estadio Centenario of Montevideo, where Uruguay beat Brazil 2–0. In the second leg, held on November 4 in Estádio Fonte Nova in Salvador, both teams tied 0–0.

Uruguay was crowned champion winning 3–1 on points (plus 2–0 on aggregate), therefore achieving their 12th Copa América title.

== Qualified teams ==
| Team | Previous final app. |
|---|---|
| Uruguay | 1919 |
| Brazil | **1919, 1922**, 1937, **1949**, 1953 |

Bold indicates winning years

== Venues ==
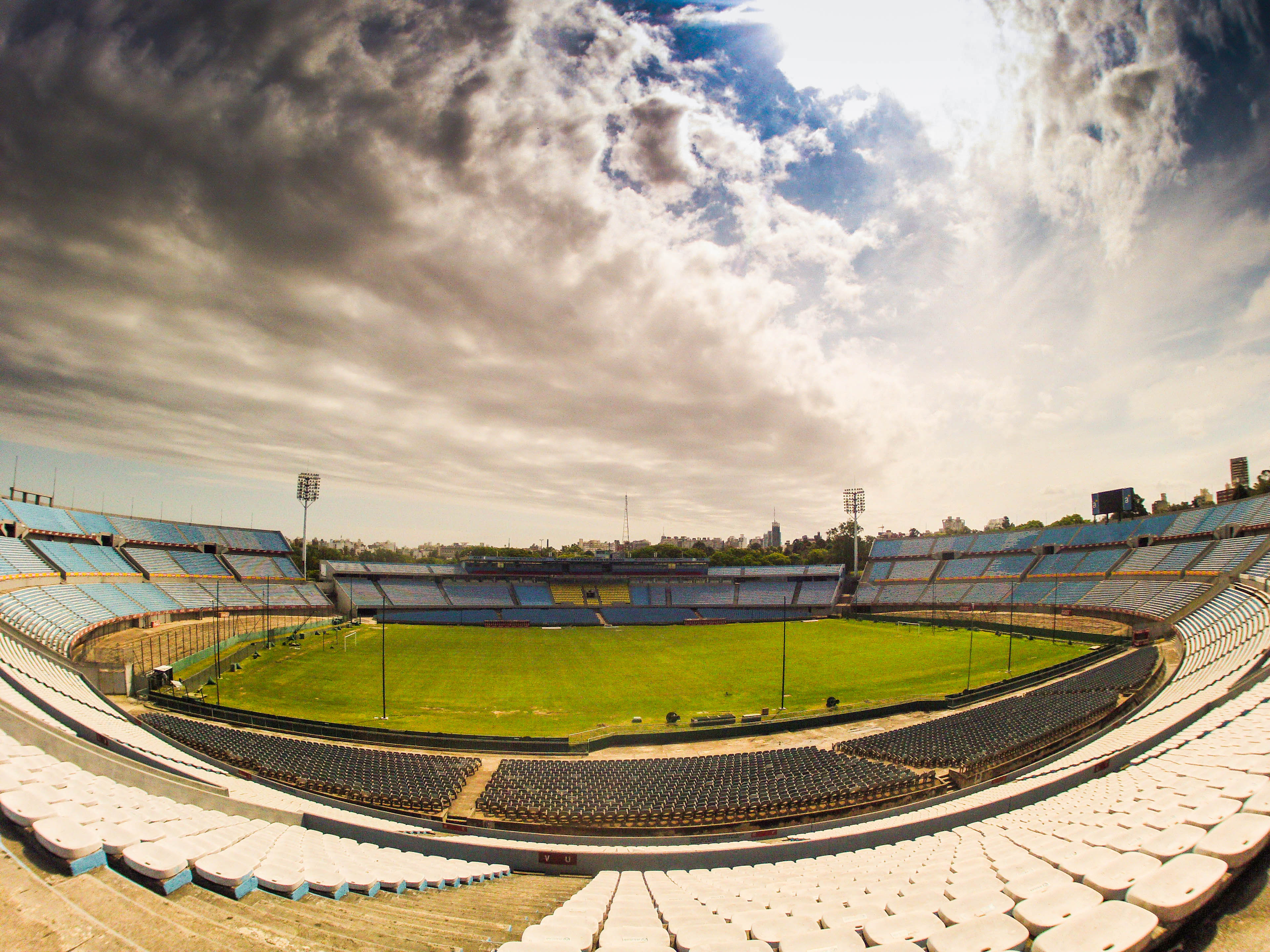
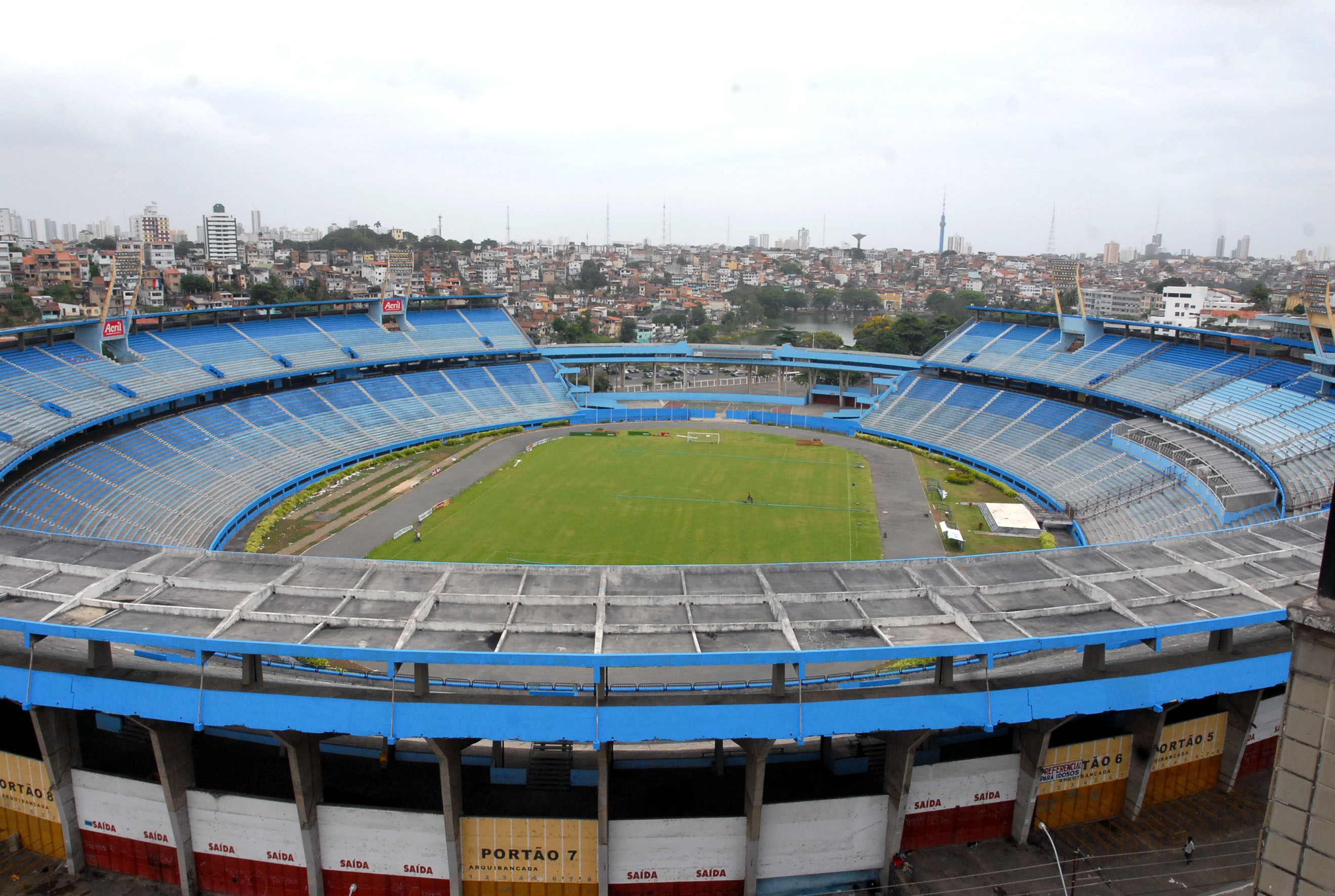
Estadio Centenario (Montevideo) and Estádio Fonte Nova (Salvador), venues for the finals

== Route to the final ==
Uruguay
Round
Brazil
Opponent
Result
Group stage
Opponent
Result
Chile
2–1
Match 1
Ecuador
1–0

Venezuela
3–0
Match 2
Argentina
0–1

Chile
0–2
Match 3
Ecuador
5–0

Venezuela
2–1
Match 4
Argentina
0–0

| Team | Pld | W | D | L | GF | GA | GD | Pts |
|---|---|---|---|---|---|---|---|---|
| Uruguay | 4 | 3 | 0 | 1 | 7 | 4 | +3 | **6** |
| Chile | 4 | 2 | 1 | 1 | 8 | 2 | +6 | **5** |
| Venezuela | 4 | 0 | 1 | 3 | 1 | 10 | −9 | **1** |

Final standings

| Team | Pld | W | D | L | GF | GA | GD | Pts |
|---|---|---|---|---|---|---|---|---|
| Brazil | 4 | 2 | 1 | 1 | 6 | 1 | +5 | **5** |
| Argentina | 4 | 1 | 3 | 0 | 5 | 4 | +1 | **5** |
| Ecuador | 4 | 0 | 2 | 2 | 4 | 10 | −6 | **2** |

Opponent
Result
Knockout stage
Opponent
Result
Peru
1–0
Semi-finals
Paraguay
1–1
Peru
1–1
Semi-finals
Paraguay
0–0

Notes

- Uruguay won 2–1 on aggregate
- Brazil qualified on a drawing of lots

== Match details ==
=== First leg ===
1983 Copa América Finals
October 27, 1983
First leg

| Uruguay | 2–0 | Brazil |
|---|---|---|
| Francescoli 41'; Diogo 80' |

Estadio Centenario, Montevideo
Attendance: 65,000
Referee: Héctor Ortiz (Paraguay)

| **Uruguay** | **Brazil** |

| GK | 1 | Rodolfo Rodríguez | (yellow card) 90' |
| RB | 14 | Víctor Diogo |
| CB | 3 | Nelson Gutiérrez |
| CB | 13 | Eduardo Acevedo |
| LB | 6 | Washington González |
| CM | 5 | Nelson Agresta |
| CM | 8 | Jorge Barrios |
| CM | 11 | Wilmar Cabrera |
| RW | 16 | Carlos Aguilera | | (substituted off) 85' |
| CF | 24 | Enzo Francescoli |
| LW | 7 | Luis A. Acosta | | (substituted off) 75' |
Substitutions:
| FW | 9 | Venancio Ramos | | (substituted on) 75' |
| MF | 18 | Miguel Bossio | | (substituted on) 85' |
Manager:
(Uruguay) Omar Borrás

| GK | 1 | Leão |
| RB | 2 | Leandro |
| CB | 3 | Márcio |
| CB | 4 | Mozer | (yellow card) 66' |
| LB | 6 | Júnior |
| CM | 16 | China | | (substituted off) 60' |
| CM | 11 | Jorginho |
| CM | 17 | Renato |
| RW | 7 | Renato Gaúcho |
| CF | 9 | Roberto Dinamite | (yellow card) 43' |
| LW | 19 | Éder | (yellow card) 45' |
Substitutions:
| MF | 10 | Tita | | (substituted on) 60' |
Manager:
(Brazil) Carlos A. Parreira

=== Second leg ===
November 4, 1983
Second leg

| Brazil | 1–1 | Uruguay |
|---|---|---|
| Jorginho 23' | | Aguilera 77' |

Estádio Fonte Nova, Salvador
Attendance: 95,000
Referee: Edison Pérez (Peru)

| **Brazil** | **Uruguay** |

| GK | 1 | Leão |
| RB | 13 | Paulo Roberto |
| CB | 3 | Márcio |
| CB | 4 | Mozer | (yellow card) 14' |
| LB | 6 | Júnior |
| RM | 16 | China |
| CM | 11 | Jorginho | (yellow card) 22' |
| CM | 8 | Sócrates |
| LM | 10 | Tita | | (substituted off) 77' |
| CF | 9 | Roberto Dinamite | | (substituted off) 43' |
| CF | 19 | Éder | (yellow card) 78' |
Substitutions:
| FW | 7 | Renato Gaúcho | | (substituted on) 77' |
| FW | 18 | Careca | | (substituted on) 43' |
Manager:
(Brazil) Carlos A. Parreira

| GK | 1 | Rodolfo Rodríguez |
| RB | 14 | Víctor Diogo |
| CB | 3 | Nelson Gutiérrez |
| CB | 13 | Eduardo Acevedo |
| LB | 6 | Washington González | (yellow card) 56' |
| CM | 5 | Nelson Agresta |
| CM | 8 | Jorge Barrios |
| CM | 11 | Wilmar Cabrera |
| RW | 16 | Carlos Aguilera | | (substituted off) 82' |
| CF | 24 | Enzo Francescoli |
| LW | 7 | Luis A. Acosta | (yellow card) 45' | (substituted off) 46' |
Substitutions:
| FW | 9 | Venancio Ramos | | (substituted on) 46' |
| MF | 18 | Miguel Bossio | | (substituted on) 82' |
Manager:
(Uruguay) Omar Borrás
