= List of Peru national football team managers =

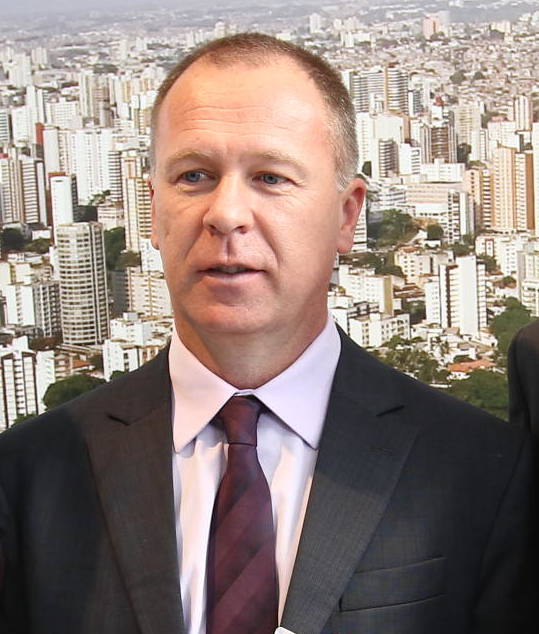
Mano Menezes, current Peru national team coach, appointed on January 29, 2026.

The following table provides a summary of the complete record of each Peru national football team manager, including their progress in the FIFA World Cup and the Copa América.

== List of managers ==
Information for this list, specifically the managers since 1983, is obtained from the Peruvian sports journal Depor.
Managers in italics took charge as caretaker or interim manager

Manager	Period	Pld	W	D	L	W %	Competitions
(Uruguay) Pedro Olivieri	1927	3	1	0	2	33.33	1927 Copa América – Third place
(Uruguay) Julio Borelli	1927	3	0	0	3	0.00	1929 Copa América – Fourth place
(Spain) Francisco Bru	1930	2	0	0	2	0.00	1930 FIFA World Cup – Group stage
(Peru) Telmo Carbajo	1935	3	1	0	2	33.33	1935 Copa América – Third place
(Peru) Alberto Denegri	1936–1937	7	3	1	3	42.86	1936 Summer Olympics – Quarter-finals; 1937 Copa América – Sixth place
(England) Jack Greenwell	1938–1939	8	8	0	0	100.00	1938 Bolivarian Games – Champions; 1939 Copa América – Champions
(Spain) Domingo Arrillaga	1941	7	1	2	4	14.29	1941 Copa América – Fifth place
(Argentina) Ángel Fernández	1942	6	1	2	3	16.67	1942 Copa América – Fifth place
(Peru) José Arana	1947	7	2	2	3	28.57	1947 Copa América – Fifth place
(Peru) Arturo Fernández	1949	7	5	0	2	71.43	1949 Copa América – Third place
(Peru) Alfonso Huapaya	1952	5	2	1	2	40.00	1952 Panamerican Championship – Fourth place
(Northern Ireland) Billy Cook	1953	4	1	2	1	25.00	1953 Copa América – Fifth place
(Argentina) Ángel Fernández	1953	4	2	0	2	50.00	1953 Copa América – Fifth place
(Peru) Juan Valdivieso	1954–1955	7	3	2	2	42.86	1955 Copa América – Third place
(Peru) Arturo Fernández	1956	10	1	3	6	10.00	1956 Copa América – Sixth place 1956 Panamerican Championship – Fourth place
(Hungary) György Orth	1957–1961	18	6	4	8	33.33	1957 Copa América – Third place 1959 Copa América (Argentina) – Fourth place
(Peru) Marcos Calderón	1961	2	0	1	1	0.00	–
(Brazil) Jaime de Almeida	1962	1	0	0	1	0.00	–
(Peru) Juan Valdivieso	1963	6	2	1	3	33.33	1963 Copa América – Fifth place
(Peru) Marcos Calderón	1965	7	2	0	5	28.57	–
(Brazil) José Gomes Nogueira	1966	2	0	0	2	0.00	–
(Peru) Marcos Calderón	1967	4	1	1	2	25.00	–
(Brazil) Didi	1968–1970	38	14	9	15	36.84	1970 FIFA World Cup – Quarter-finals
(Peru) Alejandro Heredia	1971	4	1	1	2	25.00	–
(Hungary) Lajos Baroti	1972	6	0	2	4	0.00	–
(Uruguay) Roberto Scarone	1972–1973	18	9	2	7	50.00	–
(Peru) Marcos Calderón	1975	13	8	1	4	61.53	1975 Copa América – Champions
(Peru) Alejandro Heredia	1976	4	0	2	2	0.00	–
(Peru) Marcos Calderón	1977–1978	24	9	6	9	37.50	1978 FIFA World Cup – Quarter-finals
(Peru) José Chiarella	1979	10	3	2	5	30.00	1979 Copa América – Semi-finals
(Peru) Juan José Tan	1980	1	0	1	0	0.00	–
(Peru) Marcos Calderón	1980	1	0	1	0	0.00	–
(Peru) Alejandro Heredia	1981	3	0	0	3	0.00	–
(Brazil) Tim	1981–1982	14	6	5	3	42.86	1982 FIFA World Cup – Group stage
(Peru) Juan José Tan	1983	12	2	5	5	16.67	1983 Copa América – Semi-finals
(Peru) Moisés Barack	1984–1985	16	6	6	4	37.50	–
(Peru) Roberto Chale	1985	8	2	2	4	25.00	–
(Peru) Luis Cruzado	1986	2	1	0	1	50.00	–
(Peru) Manuel Mayorga	1986	1	0	0	1	0.00	–
(Peru) Fernando Cuéllar	1987	5	1	2	2	20.00	1987 Copa América – Group stage
(Peru) José Fernández	1988–1989	6	0	2	4	0.00	–
(Brazil) Pepe	1989	16	2	5	9	12.50	1989 Copa América – Group stage
(Peru) Percy Rojas	1989	1	0	0	1	0.00	–
(Peru) Miguel Company	1991	8	2	2	4	25.00	1991 Copa América – Group stage
(Serbia and Montenegro) Vladimir Popović	1992–1993	21	3	8	10	14.29	1993 Copa América – Quarter-finals
(Peru) Miguel Company	1994–1995	15	4	3	8	26.67	1995 Copa América – Group stage
(Peru) Juan Carlos Oblitas	1996–1999	39	16	9	14	42.10	1999 Copa América – Quarter-finals
(Peru) Freddy Ternero	1997	6	3	0	3	50.00	1997 Copa América – Fourth place
(Colombia) Francisco Maturana	1999–2000	14	4	4	6	28.57	2000 CONCACAF Gold Cup – Semi-finals
(Peru) Julio César Uribe	2000–2001	15	3	4	8	20.00	2001 Copa América – Quarter-finals
(Brazil) Paulo Autuori	2003–2005	31	9	10	12	29.03	2004 Copa América – Quarter-finals
(Peru) Freddy Ternero	2005	8	3	2	3	37.50	–
(Peru) Franco Navarro	2006	7	1	3	3	14.28	–
(Peru) Julio César Uribe	2007	7	2	1	4	28.57	2007 Copa América – Quarter-finals
(Peru) José del Solar	2007–2009	28	6	6	16	21.00	–
(Uruguay) Sergio Markarián	2010–2013	44	16	14	14	36.36	2011 Copa América – Third place
(Uruguay) Pablo Bengoechea	2014	9	5	0	4	55.55	–
(Argentina) Ricardo Gareca	2015–2022	96	39	23	34	40.63	2015 Copa América – Third place Copa América Centenario – Quarter-finals; 2018 FIFA World Cup – Group stage 2019 Copa América – Runners-up; 2021 Copa América – Fourth Place
(Peru) Juan Reynoso	2022–2023	14	4	3	7	28.57	–
(Uruguay) Jorge Fossati	2023–2024	13	4	4	5	30.77	2024 Copa América – Group stage
(Peru) Óscar Ibáñez	2025	6	1	2	3	16.66	–
(Peru) Manuel Barreto	2025	3	0	1	2	0.00	–
(Argentina) Gerardo Ameli	2025	1	1	0	0	100.00	–
(Brazil) Mano Menezes	2026–	9	2	2	5	22.22	

== See also ==
- List of Peru international footballers
- Peruvian Football Federation
