= List of Peru international footballers =

Peru took part in the inaugural FIFA World Cup in 1930 and enjoyed victories in the 1938 Bolivarian Games and the 1939 Copa América, with goalkeeper Juan Valdivieso and forwards Teodoro Fernández and Alejandro Villanueva playing important roles.

Peruvian football's successful period in the 1970s brought it worldwide recognition; the team then included the formidable forward partnership of Hugo Sotil and Teófilo Cubillas, and defender Héctor Chumpitaz. This team qualified for three World Cups and won the Copa América in 1975.

Teófilo Cubillas was selected as Peru's greatest ever player in an IFFHS poll, in which he was also included in the world's Top 50. He is one of only two players to have scored five goals in two different FIFA World Cups.

== List of Peru international footballers ==
The following is a list of football players that have been part of the Peru national football team since the team was officially created in 1927, with more than 30 caps.

Names in bold are players still active to be called-up. Caps and goals updated as of 14 November 2026.

Player	Caps	Goals	Years	Ref.
**Yoshimar Yotún**	139	8	2011–	
**Pedro Gallese**	131	0	2014–	
**Luis Advíncula**	130	2	2010–	
Paolo Guerrero	128	40	2004–2025	
Roberto Palacios	128	19	1992–2012	
**André Carrillo**	109	11	2011–	
Héctor Chumpitaz	105	3	1965–1981	
Jefferson Farfán	102	27	2003–2022	
Jorge Soto	101	9	1992–2005	
Christian Cueva	100	16	2011–2025	
Juan Jayo	97	1	1994–2008	
Nolberto Solano	95	20	1994–2009	
**Renato Tapia**	92	5	2015–	
Christian Ramos	90	3	2009–2022	
Rubén Toribio Díaz	89	2	1972–1985	
Claudio Pizarro	85	20	1999–2016	
**Edison Flores**	84	17	2013–	
Juan Reynoso	84	5	1986–2000	
**Carlos Zambrano**	83	4	2008–	
Percy Olivares	83	1	1987–2001	
José Velásquez	82	12	1972–1985	
Teófilo Cubillas	81	26	1968–1982	
José Soto	77	3	1992–2003	
Alberto Rodríguez	76	0	2003–2018	
**Miguel Trauco**	76	0	2014–	
José del Solar	73	9	1986–2001	
Juan Carlos Oblitas	64	11	1973–1985	
Walter Vílchez	64	1	2001–2012	
Hugo Sotil	62	18	1970–1979	
Juan Manuel Vargas	62	4	2004–2016	
Jorge Olaechea	60	2	1979–1989	
Miguel Rebosio	60	0	1997–2005	
**Marcos López**	58	0	2018–	
Oswaldo Ramírez	57	17	1969–1982	
Flavio Maestri	57	11	1991–2007	
**Andy Polo**	57	2	2016–	
Franco Navarro	56	16	1980–1989	
José Luis Carranza	55	1	1988–1997	
Raúl Ruidíaz	54	4	2011–2023	
Jaime Duarte	54	1	1975–1985	
**Josepmir Ballón**	54	0	2008–	
**Aldo Corzo**	52	0	2009–	
César Cueto	51	6	1972–1997	
**Sergio Peña**	51	4	2017–	
**Alexander Callens**	51	2	2013–	
Pedro Requena	51	1	1983–1992	
Alfredo Quesada	50	1	1971–1978	
Óscar Ibáñez	50	0	1998–2005	
Pedro Pablo León	49	15	1963–1973	
Percy Rojas	49	7	1969–1979	
**Pedro Aquino**	49	3	2016–	
Carlos Lobatón	49	1	2005–2016	
Juan José Muñante	48	6	1967–1978	
Roberto Chale	48	4	1967–1973	
**Christofer Gonzáles**	48	3	2013–	
Martín Hidalgo	47	3	1996–2008	
**Luis Abram**	47	1	2016–	
**Miguel Araujo**	47	1	2014–	
Miguel Miranda	47	0	1993–2001	
Eloy Campos	46	0	1963–1972	
**Gianluca Lapadula**	45	11	2020–	
Andrés Mendoza	44	7	2001–2007	
Rinaldo Cruzado	44	2	2003–2014	
Ramón Mifflin	44	0	1966–1973	
**Wilder Cartagena**	44	0	2017–	
Santiago Acasiete	43	2	2004–2013	
John Galliquio	41	1	2003–2012	
Ramón Quiroga	40	1	1977–1985	
Julio César Uribe	39	9	1979–1989	
Guillermo La Rosa	39	3	1975–1985	
Luis Reyna	39	1	1980–1989	
Leao Butrón	39	0	2001–2012	
Orlando de la Torre	39	0	1967–1973	
Paolo Hurtado	38	3	2011–2019	
Luis Rubiños	38	0	1963–1972	
Alberto Gallardo	37	11	1962–1970	
José Fernández	37	2	1959–1973	
Jorge Hirano	36	11	1984–1991	
Cornelio Heredia	36	4	1947–1956	
Luis Calderón	36	0	1949–1961	
Guillermo Delgado	36	0	1952–1957	
Julio Meléndez	35	0	1965–1977	
Marko Ciurlizza	34	0	1999–2009	
Julio Rivera	34	0	1992–1997	
**Anderson Santamaría**	34	0	2017–	
Eduardo Malásquez	33	2	1979–1987	
Luis Ramírez	33	2	2005–2014	
Leonardo Rojas	33	0	1984–1989	
Teodoro Fernández	32	24	1935–1947	
Julio Baylón	32	2	1968–1972	
**Yordy Reyna**	32	2	2013–	
Félix Castillo	31	7	1947–1958	
Máximo Mosquera	31	7	1947–1957	
Germán Leguía	31	3	1978–1983	
Pablo Zegarra	31	1	1993–1999	
Roberto Drago	30	7	1949–1961	
Eusebio Acasuzo	30	0	1979–1985	
Álvaro Barco	30	0	1986–1997	
José Navarro	30	0	1972–1979	

== See also ==
- List of Peru national football team managers
- Peruvian Football Federation
