= Coimbra (surname) =

Coimbra is a Portuguese surname. Notable people with the surname include:

- Adelmar Faria Coimbra-Filho (1924–2016), Brazilian biologist and primatologist
- Antonio Luiz Coimbra de Castro (1932–2004), Brazilian military general and doctor
- Arthur Antunes Coimbra, known as Zico (born 1953), Brazilian footballer and manager
- André Coimbra (born 1986), Portuguese card game player
- Carlos Coimbra (1925–2007), Brazilian director
- Cristian Coimbra (born 1988), Bolivian footballer
- Edu Coimbra (born 1947), Brazilian footballer and manager, Zico's brother
- Erika Coimbra (born 1980), Brazilian volleyball player
- Estácio Coimbra (1872–1937), Brazilian lawyer and politician
- Fernando Coimbra, Brazilian director
- Flávio Ataúlfo de Coimbra (fl. 8th century), Visigothic knight
- Herlander Coimbra (born 1968), Angolan basketball player
- Higor Coimbra (born 1987), Brazilian footballer
- Jacob Curiel of Coimbra (1514–1576), Portuguese merchant and naval commander
- João Coimbra (born 1986), Brazilian footballer
- Júlio César da Cruz Coimbra (born 1980), Brazilian footballer
- Miguel Coimbra (born 1977), French artist
- Milton Coimbra (born 1975), Bolivian footballer
- Rolando Coimbra (born 1960), Bolivian footballer
- Rui Coimbra Chaves, known as Ruca (born 1990), Portuguese footballer
- Sérgio Mendes Coimbra (born 1988), Brazilian footballer
- Tenente Coimbra (born 1991), Brazilian politician
- Theotonius of Coimbra (c. 1082–1162), Portuguese cleric, royal advisor and Catholic saint
- Tiago Coimbra (born 2004), Canadian soccer player
- Welliton de Moraes Coimbra, known as Tozin (born 1984), Brazilian footballer

== Dukes of Coimbra and relations ==
- Beatrice of Coimbra (1435–1462), Portuguese noble and Lady of Ravenstein
- Isabel of Coimbra (1432–1455), Portuguese noble and Queen of Portugal
- James of Coimbra, also known as James of Portugal (1433–1459), Portuguese noble and cleric
- John of Coimbra (1431–1457), Portuguese noble and Prince of Antioch
- Peter of Coimbra (1392–1449), Portuguese noble, Duke of Coimbra and Regent of Portugal
- Peter of Coimbra, Constable of Portugal (c. 1429–1466), Portuguese noble, military commander and claimed King of Aragon
- Philippa of Coimbra (1437–1497), Portuguese noble and nun
