= Eduardo Muñoz =

Eduardo Muñoz may refer to:

- Eduardo Rey Muñoz, Peruvian footballer
- Eduardo Muñoz Bachs, Spanish-Cuban poster and comics artist
- Eduardo Muñoz Inchausti Chilean politician
