= Pedro Blanco =

Pedro Blanco may refer to:

- Pedro Blanco (footballer) (born 1958), Colombian footballer
- Pedro Blanco (slave trader) (1795–1854), Spanish slave trader
- Pedro Antonio Blanco (1952–2000), lieutenant colonel of the Spanish Army
- Pedro Blanco López (1883–1919), Spanish pianist and academic
- Pedro Blanco Soto (1795–1829), President of Bolivia
- Pedro Blanco (Spanish Armada) (fl. 1588–1616), Spanish seaman who survived the Spanish Armada
- Pedro Blanco (Guangdong), a rock in the waters east of Hong Kong
