= Nikolac =

Nikolac is a surname. Notable people with the surname include:

- Daniel Nikolac (1961–2020), Venezuelan footballer
- Juraj Nikolac (born 1932), Croatian chess player
