= Carlos Arias =

Carlos Arias may refer to:

- Carlos Arias Ortiz, Mexican biochemist; winner of the Carlos J. Finlay Prize for Microbiology (UNESCO, 2001)
- Carlos Arias (footballer, born 1956), Bolivian football defender
- Carlos Arias (Chilean footballer) (born 1986), Chilean football (soccer) goalkeeper
- Carlos Erwin Arias (born 1982), Bolivian football (soccer) goalkeeper
