= Santel =

Santel is a surname. Notable people with the surname include:

- Ad Santel (1887–1966), German-born American wrestler
- Mark Santel (born 1968), American soccer player and coach

== See also ==
- Sante
- Santel, Texas
- Santelli
