= Alberto Mora =

Alberto Mora is the name of:

- Alberto Mora (footballer) (born 1959), Peruvian footballer
- Alberto J. Mora (born 1951), retired General Counsel of the U.S. Navy
- Alberto di Morra (c. 1105 – 1187), a.k.a. Pope Gregory VIII (21 October – 17 December 1187 (his death))
