= Pedro Requena =

Pedro Requena may refer to:

- Pedro Requena (footballer, born 1961), Peruvian football centre-back
- Pedro Requena (footballer, born 1991), Peruvian football right-back
