= Urízar =

Urízar is a surname. Notable people with the surname include:

- Amílcar Méndez Urízar, Guatemalan human rights activist
- Carlos Urizar (born 1957), Bolivian footballer
- Christian Urízar (born 1968), Chilean politician
- Pello Urizar (born 1968), Basque politician
- Tess Uriza Holthe (born 1966), Filipino-American writer
