= Jorge Camacho =

Jorge Camacho may refer to:

- Jorge Camacho (footballer)
- Jorge Camacho (painter) (1934–2011), Cuban realist painter
- Jorge Camacho (writer) (born 1966), Spanish writer in Esperanto and Spanish

== See also ==
- Camacho
