= Jorge Ramírez =

Jorge Ramírez may refer to:

- Jorge Ramírez (Uruguayan footballer) (born 1986), Uruguayan footballer
- Jorge Ramírez (footballer, born 1955), Peruvian footballer
- Jorge Ramírez (footballer, born 1975), Peruvian footballer
- Jorge Ramírez Gallego (born 1940), Colombian footballer
- Jorge Carlos Ramírez Marín (born 1961), Mexican politician
