= Carlos Betancourt =

Carlos Betancourt may refer to:

- Carlos Betancourt (footballer) (born 1957), Venezuelan 1980s forward
- Carlos Betancourt (boxer) (born 1959), Puerto Rican middleweight Olympian in 1976
- Carlos Betancourt (artist) (born 1966), American multi-disciplinary curator and designer

== See also ==
- Carlos Betancur (born 1989), Colombian road racing cyclist
