= Juan Caicedo =

Juan Caicedo may refer to:

- Juan Caicedo (footballer, born 1955)
- Juan Caicedo (footballer, born 1996)
- Juan José Caicedo, Ecuadorian discus thrower
- Juan Fernando Caicedo (born 1989), Colombian footballer
