= Gustavo Fernández =

Gustavo Fernández may refer to:

- Gustavo Fernández (Argentine footballer) (born 1990), Argentine football striker
- Gustavo Fernández (Uruguayan footballer) (born 1952), Uruguayan football goalkeeper
- Gustavo Fernández (tennis) (born 1994), Argentine wheelchair tennis player
