= Gunfighters of Casa Grande =

1964 film by Roy Rowland

- Theatrical release poster
- Directed by: Roy Rowland
- Written by: Story: Borden Chase; Patricia Chase; Screenplay: Borden Chase; Patricia Chase; Clark Reynolds
- Produced by: Sam Abarbanel; Lester Welch
- Starring: Alex Nicol; Jorge Mistral; Dick Bentley; Steve Rowland; Phil Posner; Mercedes Alonso; Diana Lorys; Maria Granada; Roberto Rey; Aldo Sambrell
- Cinematography: Jose Aguayo; Manuel Marino Metrocolor, CinemaScope
- Edited by: George A. Lee
- Music by: Johnny Douglas
- Distributed by: Metro-Goldwyn-Mayer
- Release dates: April 1, 1964 (U.S.); May 1, 1964 (West Germany); January 18, 1965 (Sweden); April 15, 1965 (Denmark); September 30, 1965 (UK)
- Running time: 92 minutes
- Countries: United States; Spain
- Language: English
- Box office: 19,939,562 ₧ (ESP)

Gunfighters of Casa Grande (Spanish: Los pistoleros de Casa Grande) is a 1964 Eurowestern film, co-produced by American and Spanish producers. Based on a story by Borden and Patricia Chase, it was later developed into a screenplay with the assistance of screenwriter Clark Reynolds and directed by Roy Rowland, the last film he made for Metro-Goldwyn-Mayer.

The film starred Alex Nicol, Jorge Mistral, Dick Bentley, Steve Rowland (son of the director), Phil Posner, Mercedes Alonso, Diana Lorys, Maria Granada, Roberto Rey, and Aldo Sambrell. Antonio Mayans and José Manuel Martín both had minor appearances in the film, with the latter having an uncredited role.

The film's trailer was originally narrated by voice actor Don LaFontaine in his first credited role. He had been working as recording engineer and copywriter, when after the original announcer failed to appear for the scheduled recording, LaFontaine agreed to record the trailer.

== Plot ==
Joe Daylight is on the run along with members of his outlaw gang, the Kid, Doc, and Henri. After fleeing from a bank robbery, they manage to elude the posse chasing them after crossing into Mexico. The gang had agreed to meet later to divide the money, but Daylight instead tells them that he has used the money to buy a hacienda, the Casa Grande. Although several of them protest, the gang agrees to follow Daylight to the ranch. He also enlists a mystical Mexican gunfighter called "Viajero" (Traveller) – who knows the neighborhood and comes from a haciendero family (though few know this) – to help him fit into the role of a Mexican hacienda owner, a hidalgo.

In effect, Daylight has won the hacienda in a poker game, and his plan is to keep the gang together and use the ranch as a cover to rustle cattle from his neighbors and sell them at inflated prices across the border. However, his comrades soon adapt to life on the ranch. The Traveller and the Kid meet two women named Dona Maria de Castellar and Pacesita, with whom they eventually fall in love.

Daylight's plans are temporarily threatened by another bandit gang led by Rojo, who begins stealing cattle from numerous ranches in the area, including his own. Organizing the local ranchers against the bandits, they succeed in destroying Rojo and his men. This has an unintended consequence, however, as Daylight's men have decided to remain at Casa Grande. His men and he begin to argue, and during the course of events, Daylight shoots and kills Doc, causing the Traveller to kill Daylight, in turn. With their former leader dead, the men stay on the ranch and the Traveller and Maria begin a new life on the Casa Grande.

== Cast ==
- Alex Nicol as Joe Daylight — an outlaw and professional gambler, he is the leader of a group of bandits rustling cattle across the US-Mexican border.
- Jorge Mistral as the Traveller — a recent member of the gang, he is the most outspoken of the group, often questioning Daylight's leadership.
- Steve Rowland as the Kid — the youngest member of the gang, the Traveller and he become friends. Although reluctantly supporting Daylight, the Traveller and he eventually side against Daylight.
- Dick Bentley as Doc — one of Daylight's three partners, he is an elderly outlaw. Although less vocal, he wishes to retire in Mexico with the others.
- Phil Posner as Henri — another of Daylight's partners
- Mercedes Alonso as Dona Maria de Castellar — the daughter of a neighboring rancher, she falls in love with the Traveller.
- Diana Lorys as Gitana — the girlfriend of Joe Daylight
- Maria Granada as Pacesita — the personal maid and confidant of Maria, the Kid and she also become involved romantically.
- Roberto Rey as Don Castellar de Verdugo — a neighboring rancher and landowner, he is the father of Maria de Castellar.
- Aldo Sambrell as Rojo — a rival bandit leader,his gang is threatening the ranchers in the area, including Joe Daylight's outfit.
- Toni Fuentes - Carlos
- Angel Solano - Don Ariola
- Jim Gillen - sheriff
- Mike Ekiss - deputy
- Fernando Villena - Mario
- Emilio Rodriguez - Francisco
- Ana Maria Custodio - Senora Durano
- Mario Barros - Rio
- Ivan Tubau - Pecos
- Jose Mayens - Manuel
- Miguel Brendel as Mike Brendel - bartender
- Simon Arriaga - Carvajal
- Jose Martin - Don Luis Ariola

== Reception ==
Gunfight at Casa Grande was released in Spain during early 1964 and premiered in the United States on April 1, 1964; it was later released in Europe between May 1964 and September 1965. Moderately successful, the film earned 19,939,562 ₧ (US: $189,608) during its initial run in Spain. As of September 1, 1965, the film was still running in American theaters and appeared in the New York City area as a double feature along with She.

The film was aired on television in the United States during the late 1960s until the mid-1970s and again during the early to mid-1990s. The film was released on DVD during the early 2000s, although this was on a limited scale and consequently remains one of the more obscure and hard-to-find Westerns.

In his investigation of narrative structures in spaghetti Western films, Fridlund writes, "Gunfighters of Casa Grande basically conforms to the 'Classical Plot' in Will Wright's analysis of US Westerns, and Traveller is a "Classical" hero who comes from the outside, saves society (first from Rojo and then from Daylight) and then stays inside." However, the cunning manipulator and unpredictable psychopath Daylight shows a close affinity to many main characters in the wave of Spaghetti Western films about to emerge on the screens.
