= Israel Rodríguez =

Israel Rodríguez may refer to:

- Israel Rodríguez (journalist) (born 1974), Puerto Rican journalist
- Israel Rodríguez (volleyball) (born 1981), Spanish volleyball player
- Israel Rodríguez (Ecuadorian footballer)
- Israel Rodríguez (Paraguayan footballer) (born 1982), Paraguayan footballer
