= Geraldo Touro =

Brazilian footballer

Personal information
- Full name: Geraldo Pereira
- Date of birth: 3 February 1958 (age 68)
- Place of birth: São José da Lapa, Brazil
- Height: 1.73 m (5 ft 8 in)
- Position: Forward

Youth career
- Uberlândia

Senior career*
Years	Team	Apps	(Gls)
1975–1978	América Mineiro		
1978–1982	Uberlândia		
1979	→ Villa Nova (loan)		
1980	→ XV de Jaú (loan)		
1981	→ Sport Recife (loan)		
1982	→ Bahia (loan)		
1982	XV de Jaú		
1982–1984	Botafogo	90	(8)
1984–1985	São Paulo	60	(5)
1986–1987	Coritiba		
1987–1988	Joinville		
1988	Paulista		
1988–1989	Pinheiros-PR		
1989	Atlético Paranaense		
1989	Fernandópolis		
1990	Bahia		
1990–1991	Araxá		
1991	Joinville		
1992	URT		
1992	Juventus-SP		
1992	Fernandópolis		
1993–1994	Marcílio Dias		
1995	Blumenau		

International career
1983	Brazil	1	(0)
1984	Brazil Olympic	5	(0)
- * Club domestic league appearances and goals

Geraldo Pereira (born 3 February 1958), better known as Geraldo Touro, is a Brazilian former professional footballer who played as a forward.

== Club career ==
Geraldo Touro played for several clubs in Brazil, most notably Botafogo and São Paulo. He was also champion for Coritiba and Joinville. He ended his football career in Santa Catarina, where he currently resides, in the city of Itajaí.

Playing for Botafogo, he scored a historic goal in a match against CR Vasco da Gama, 7 November 1982.

== International career ==
Geraldo Touro was called up to the squad that participated in the 1983 Copa América, and took part in one match, against Argentina, 24 August.

In 1984, also participated in the Pre-Olympic Tournament.

== Honours ==
São Paulo

- Campeonato Paulista: 1985

Coritiba

- Campeonato Paranaense: 1986

Joinville

- Campeonato Catarinense: 1987

Brazil Olympic

- CONMEBOL Pre-Olympic Tournament: 1984
