= Roberto Pérez (Bolivian footballer) =

Bolivian footballer (1960–2024)

Personal information
- Date of birth: 17 April 1960
- Place of birth: San Ignacio de Velasco, Bolivia
- Date of death: 20 February 2024 (aged 63)
- Place of death: Santa Cruz de la Sierra, Bolivia
- Position: Defender

Senior career*
Years	Team	Apps	(Gls)
1978–1982	Real Santa Cruz		
1983	Guabirá		
1984	Real Santa Cruz		
1985–1986	Bolívar		
1987–1988	Club Destroyers		
1989	Blooming		
1990–1991	Club San José		
1992	Bolívar		
1993–1994	Club San José		
1995–1997	Oriente Petrolero		

International career
1983–1993	Bolivia	16	(0)
- * Club domestic league appearances and goals

Roberto Pérez (17 April 1960 – 20 February 2024) was a Bolivian footballer who played as a defender. He made 16 appearances for the Bolivia national team from 1983 to 1993. He was also part of Bolivia's squad for the 1983 Copa América tournament. Pérez died in Santa Cruz de la Sierra on 20 February 2024, at the age of 63.
