= Raúl García (footballer, born 1959) =

Peruvian footballer

Personal information
- Date of birth: 21 September 1959 (age 67)

International career
Years	Team	Apps	(Gls)
1984	Peru	2	(0)

Raúl García (born 21 September 1959) is a Peruvian footballer. He played in two matches for the Peru national football team in 1984. He was also part of Peru's squad for the 1983 Copa América tournament.
