= Álvaro Escobar (footballer) =

Colombian footballer (born 1955)

Personal information
- Date of birth: 16 May 1955 (age 71)
- Place of birth: Medellín, Colombia
- Position: Defender

International career
Years	Team	Apps	(Gls)
1983–1985	Colombia	10	(0)

Álvaro Escobar (born 16 May 1955) is a Colombian former footballer. He played in ten matches for the Colombia national football team from 1983 to 1985. He was also part of Colombia's squad for the 1983 Copa América tournament.
