= Braulen Barboza =

Venezuelan footballer (born 1955)

Personal information
- Date of birth: 11 May 1955 (age 71)
- Position: Defender

International career
Years	Team	Apps	(Gls)
1983	Venezuela	2	(0)

Braulen Barboza (born 11 May 1955) is a Venezuelan former footballer. He played in two matches for the Venezuela national football team in 1983. He was also part of Venezuela's squad for the 1983 Copa América tournament.
