= Santelli =

Santelli is an Italian surname. Notable people with the surname include:

- Alberto Santelli (born 1953), Uruguayan soccer player
- Benjamin Santelli (born 1991), French soccer player
- Claude Santelli (1923–2001), French film director and screenwriter
- Giorgio Santelli (1897–1985), Italian fencer
- Giuseppe Santelli (1880–1956), Italian painter
- Italo Santelli (1866–1945), Italian fencer
- Jole Santelli (1968–2020), Italian politician
- Paul Santelli (1898–1928), French flying ace
- Rick Santelli (born 1956), American editor
