= Víctor Rabuñal =

Uruguayan footballer (born 1962)

Personal information
- Date of birth: 8 January 1962 (age 64)

International career
Years	Team	Apps	(Gls)
1983	Uruguay	4	(0)

Víctor Rabuñal (born 8 January 1962) is a Uruguayan footballer. He played in four matches for the Uruguay national football team in 1983. He was also part of Uruguay's squad for the 1983 Copa América tournament.
