= Edgar Castillo (Bolivian footballer) =

Bolivian footballer (born 1957)

Personal information
- Full name: Edgar Castillo Salinas
- Date of birth: 17 April 1957 (age 69)

Senior career*
| Years | Team | Apps | (Gls) |
| 1982–1986 | Club Blooming Santa Cruz | | |

International career
| 1983–1985 | Bolivia | 10 | (0) |
- * Club domestic league appearances and goals

Edgar Castillo Salinas (born 17 April 1957) is a Bolivian footballer. He played in ten matches for the Bolivia national football team from 1983 to 1985. He was also part of Bolivia's squad for the 1983 Copa América tournament.
