= Eduardo Terrazas =

Bolivian footballer (born 1962)

Personal information
- Date of birth: 6 March 1962 (age 64)
- Place of birth: Portachuelo, Bolivia

International career
Years	Team	Apps	(Gls)
1983	Bolivia	8	(0)

Eduardo Terrazas (born 6 March 1962) is a Bolivian footballer. He played in eight matches for the Bolivia national football team in 1983. He was also part of Bolivia's squad for the 1983 Copa América tournament.
