= José Moreno (Ecuadorian footballer) =

Ecuadorian footballer (born 1962)

Personal information
- Date of birth: 25 May 1962 (age 64)
- Position: Midfielder

International career
| Years | Team | Apps | (Gls) |
| 1984–1985 | Ecuador | 5 | (0) |

José Moreno (born 25 May 1962) is an Ecuadorian footballer. He played in five matches for the Ecuador national football team from 1984 to 1985. He was also part of Ecuador's squad for the 1983 Copa América tournament.
