= José Milillo =

Venezuelan footballer (born 1961)

Personal information
- Date of birth: 17 November 1961 (age 64)
- Position: Midfielder

International career
Years	Team	Apps	(Gls)
1983	Venezuela	1	(0)

José Milillo (born 17 November 1961) is a Venezuelan footballer. He played in one match for the Venezuela national football team in 1983. He was also part of Venezuela's squad for the 1983 Copa América tournament.
