= Alfredo Encalada =

Ecuadorian footballer (born 1957)

Personal information
- Date of birth: 4 September 1957 (age 69)
- Place of birth: Guayaquil, Ecuador

International career
Years	Team	Apps	(Gls)
1983	Ecuador	2	(0)

Alfredo Encalada (born 4 September 1957) is an Ecuadorian footballer. He played in two matches for the Ecuador national football team in 1983. He was also part of Ecuador's squad for the 1983 Copa América tournament.
