= Toninho Carlos =

Brazilian footballer (born 1963)

Personal information
- Full name: Antônio Carlos Corrêa
- Date of birth: 17 May 1963 (age 63)
- Place of birth: Lins, Brazil
- Position: Sweeper

International career
| Years | Team | Apps | (Gls) |
| 1983 | Brazil | 4 | (0) |

Antônio Carlos Corrêa (born 17 May 1963), known as Toninho Carlos, is a Brazilian footballer who played as a defender. He played in four matches for the Brazil national football team in 1983. He was also part of Brazil's squad for the 1983 Copa América tournament.
