= Jacinto Rodríguez (footballer) =

Paraguayan footballer (born 1958)

Personal information
- Date of birth: 5 December 1958 (age 67)

International career
| Years | Team | Apps | (Gls) |
| 1983–1985 | Paraguay | 3 | (0) |

Jacinto Rodríguez (born 5 December 1958) is a Paraguayan footballer. He played in three matches for the Paraguay national football team from 1983 to 1985. He was also part of Paraguay's squad for the 1983 Copa América tournament.
