= Franco Rizzi =

Venezuelan footballer (born 1964)

Personal information
- Date of birth: 13 July 1964 (age 62)

International career
Years	Team	Apps	(Gls)
1987–1989	Venezuela	4	(0)

Franco Rizzi (born 13 July 1964) is a Venezuelan footballer. He played in four matches for the Venezuela national football team from 1987 to 1989. He was also part of Venezuela's squad for the 1983 Copa América tournament.
