= Nicola Simonelli =

Venezuelan footballer (born 1958)

Personal information
- Date of birth: 20 January 1958 (age 68)

International career
Years	Team	Apps	(Gls)
1985	Venezuela	3	(0)

Nicola Simonelli (born 20 January 1958) is a Venezuelan footballer. He played in three matches for the Venezuela national football team in 1985. He was also part of Venezuela's squad for the 1983 Copa América tournament.
