= Juan Muhlethaler =

Uruguayan footballer (1954–2026)

Personal information
- Full name: Juan Francisco Muhlethaler
- Date of birth: 17 December 1954
- Place of birth: Canelones, Uruguay
- Date of death: 10 August 2026 (aged 71)
- Position: Forward

Senior career*
Years	Team	Apps	(Gls)
1972–1979	Montevideo Wanderers		
1980	Peñarol		
1981–1982	Técnico Universitario		
1983	Rampla Juniors		
1984	Cúcuta Deportivo		
1985	Fénix		
1986	Macará		
1987	Técnico Universitario		
1988	Deportivo Quevedo		

International career
1975–1983	Uruguay	6	(1)
Medal record
Representing Uruguay
Copa América
Winner	1983
- * Club domestic league appearances and goals

Juan Francisco Muhlethaler (17 December 1954 – 10 August 2026) was a Uruguayan professional footballer who played as a forward. He received six caps for the Uruguay national team, scoring once.

Muhlethaler died on 10 August 2026, at the age of 71.
