= Marcelo Pacheco =

Chilean footballer (born 1958)

Personal information
- Full name: Marcelo Alexander Pacheco Reyes
- Date of birth: 18 March 1958 (age 68)
- Place of birth: Santiago, Chile

Senior career*
| Years | Team | Apps | (Gls) |
| 1977 | Curicó Unido | | |
| 1978–1979 | Colo-Colo | | |
| 1980–1984 | Naval | | |
| 1985 | Universidad de Chile | | |
| 1986 | Naval | | |
| 1988 | Everton | | |

International career
| 1979 | Chile U20 | | |
| 1983 | Chile | 10 | (0) |

Managerial career
- Colo-Colo (youth)
- Santiago Morning (youth)
- Unión San Felipe (youth)
- 2005–2006: Persma Manado
- 2006–2007: PSPS Pekanbaru
- 2008–2009: Grecia de Chone
- * Club domestic league appearances and goals

Marcelo Alexander Pacheco Reyes (born 18 March 1958) is a Chilean footballer and manager. He played in ten matches for the Chile national football team in 1983. He was also part of Chile's squad for the 1983 Copa América tournament.

== Playing career ==
His last club was Everton in 1988.

At international level, he took part of Chile at under-20 level in the 1979 South American Championship. At senior level, he made 10 appearances for Chile in 1983.

== Coaching career ==
Following his retirement, he worked as coach at the youth ranks of Colo-Colo, Santiago Morning and Unión San Felipe. As head coach, he led the Indonesian teams Persma Manado and PSPS Pekanbaru from 2005 to 2007 and the Ecuadorian club Grecia in 2008.

== Personal life ==
Pacheco is the son-in-law of the former football manager Luis Ibarra.
