= Tulio Quinteros =

Ecuadorian footballer (born 1963)

Personal information
- Date of birth: 4 May 1963 (age 63)
- Place of birth: Esmeraldas, Ecuador

International career
Years	Team	Apps	(Gls)
1983–1989	Ecuador	7	(0)

Tulio Quinteros (born 4 May 1963) is an Ecuadorian footballer. He played in seven matches for the Ecuador national football team from 1983 to 1989. He was also part of Ecuador's squad for the 1983 Copa América tournament.
