= Wilson Armas =

Ecuadorian footballer (born 1958)

Personal information
- Full name: Wilson Antonio Armas Ponce
- Date of birth: 2 April 1958 (age 68)
- Place of birth: Ibarra, Ecuador
- Position: Defender

Senior career*
Years	Team	Apps	(Gls)
1977–1978	Aucas		
1979	LDU Quito		
1980–1987	El Nacional		
1988	Universidad Católica		
1989	Deportivo Cuenca		

International career
1983–1985	Ecuador	14	(0)

Managerial career
- 1998: El Nacional (interim)
- 2006–2007: Imbabura
- 2007: LDU Loja
- 2008–2011: Imbabura
- 2011: Deportivo Quevedo
- 2012: Deportivo Azogues
- 2013: Imbabura
- 2014: Pilahuin Tío
- 2015: Orense
- 2017: Imbabura
- * Club domestic league appearances and goals

Wilson Antonio Armas Ponce (born 2 April 1958) is an Ecuadorian football manager and former player who played as a defender. He played in 14 matches for the Ecuador national football team from 1983 to 1985. He was also part of Ecuador's squad for the 1983 Copa América tournament.
