= Julio Barboza =

Venezuelan footballer (born 1954)

Personal information
- Date of birth: 5 November 1954 (age 71)
- Position: Midfielder

International career
Years	Team	Apps	(Gls)
1983	Venezuela	2	(0)

Julio Barboza (born 5 November 1954) is a Venezuelan former footballer. He played in two matches for the Venezuela national football team in 1983. He was also part of Venezuela's squad for the 1983 Copa América tournament.
