= Bolívar Ruiz =

Ecuadorian footballer (born 1958)

Personal information
- Date of birth: 29 April 1958 (age 68)
- Place of birth: Cotacachi, Bolivia

International career
Years	Team	Apps	(Gls)
1983	Ecuador	2	(0)

Bolívar Ruiz (born 29 April 1958) is an Ecuadorian footballer. He played in two matches for the Ecuador national football team in 1983. He was also part of Ecuador's squad for the 1983 Copa América tournament.
