= Carlos Gorozabel =

Ecuadorian footballer (born 1956)

Personal information
- Date of birth: 8 October 1956 (age 70)
- Place of birth: Portoviejo, Ecuador

International career
Years	Team	Apps	(Gls)
1983	Ecuador	3	(0)

Carlos Gorozabel (born 8 October 1956) is an Ecuadorian footballer. He played in three matches for the Ecuador national football team in 1983. He was also part of Ecuador's squad for the 1983 Copa América tournament.
