= Carlos Betancourt (footballer) =

Venezuelan footballer (born 1957)

Personal information
- Date of birth: 10 November 1957 (age 68)

International career
Years	Team	Apps	(Gls)
1983–1989	Venezuela	7	(0)

Carlos Betancourt (born 10 November 1957) is a Venezuelan footballer. He played in seven matches for the Venezuela national football team from 1983 to 1989. He was also part of Venezuela's squad for the 1983 Copa América tournament.
