= Gustavo Fernández (Uruguayan footballer) =

Uruguayan footballer (born 1952)

Personal information
- Full name: Gustavo Daniel Fernández Figuerón
- Date of birth: 16 February 1952 (age 74)
- Place of birth: Montevideo, Uruguay
- Position: Goalkeeper

Senior career*
Years	Team	Apps	(Gls)
1973–1975	Rentistas		
1975–1980	Sevilla	56	(0)
1980–1981	Murcia	11	(0)
1982–1984	Peñarol		
1985	River Plate	0	(0)
1985–1986	Gimnasia y Esgrima	30	(0)
1987	Vitória		
1988	Palestino		

International career
1974	Uruguay	6	(0)
Medal record
Representing Uruguay
Copa América
Winner	1983
- * Club domestic league appearances and goals

Gustavo Daniel Fernández Figuerón (born 16 February 1952) is a Uruguayan former professional footballer who played as a goalkeeper. He played club football for C.A. Rentistas, Sevilla, Murcia and Peñarol, River Plate among others. He was an unused member of Uruguayan squad at 1974 FIFA World Cup and 1983 Copa América, winning the latter tournament.
