= Alberto Mora (footballer) =

Peruvian footballer (born 1959)

Personal information
- Date of birth: 21 December 1959 (age 66)

International career
Years	Team	Apps	(Gls)
1983	Peru	5	(0)

Alberto Mora (born 21 December 1959) is a Peruvian footballer. He played in five matches for the Peru national football team in 1983. He was also part of Peru's squad for the 1983 Copa América tournament.
