= Fernando Fiorillo =

Colombian footballer (born 1956)

Personal information
- Full name: Fernando Fiorillo de la Rosa
- Date of birth: 23 November 1956 (age 69)
- Place of birth: Soledad, Atlántico, Colombia
- Position: Midfielder

Senior career*
Years	Team	Apps	(Gls)
1976–1981	Junior	182	(23)
1982	Medellín	44	(15)
1983–1985	Junior	111	(22)
1986	Bucaramanga	5	(0)

International career
1983	Colombia		
- * Club domestic league appearances and goals

Fernando Fiorillo de la Rosa (born 23 November 1956) is a former Colombian football player.

== Career ==
Born in Soledad, Atlántico, Fiorillo played football for Atlético Junior during his professional career. Fiorillo made several appearances for the senior Colombia national football team, including participating at the 1983 Copa América.

He also played for Colombia at the 1980 Olympic Games in Moscow.
