= Antonio Luiz Coimbra de Castro =

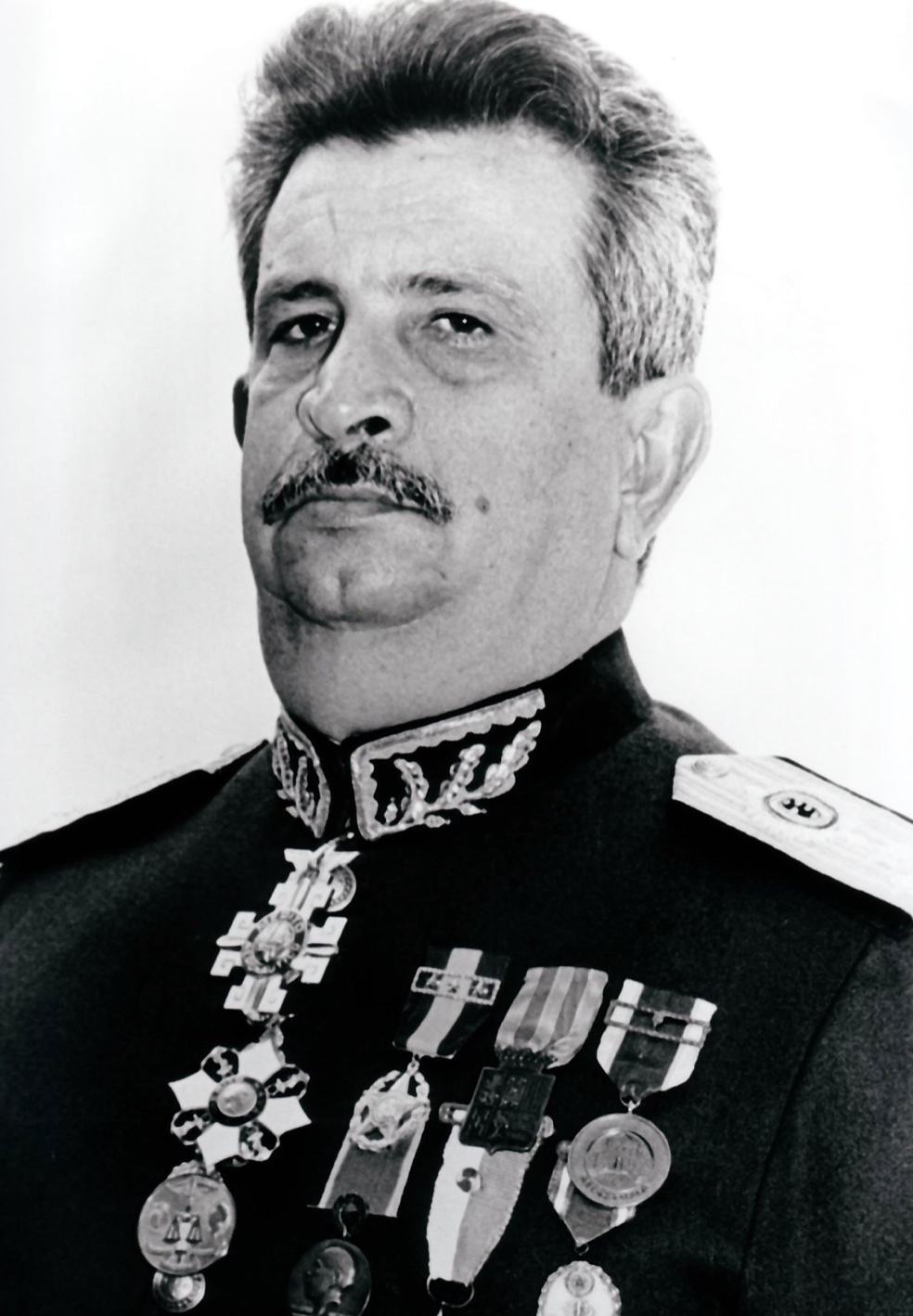
Antonio Luiz Coimbra de Castro

Antônio Luíz Coimbra de Castro (March 16, 1932 in Recife – August 13, 2004 in Brasília) was a Brazilian Army general and a medical doctor.

After retiring from the Army, General Castro was member of the "Defesa Civil do Brasil", that is the equivalent to a National Guard of the United States, he was responsible for developing the Brazilian national philosophy and general policies in natural disasters prevention and emergency planning. Castro was the author of important technical articles and books on this subject, translated and published in several countries around the world.

Castro was the General Manager and CEO of Brazilian Army Central Hospital in Rio de Janeiro (Hospital Central do Exército) and General Director and CEO of the Brazilian Army National Health Department in Brasília (Diretoria de Saúde do Exército).

In March 2016, in recognition of outstanding services to the Brazilian Army, the Brazilian Army Commander published the decree 285 granting the Battalion of Special Operations, based in Goiania, the historical denomination of "Battalion General Antonio Luiz Coimbra de Castro.
