= Jorge Ramírez (footballer, born 1955) =

Peruvian footballer (born 1955)

Jorge Nelson Ramírez
Personal information
- Date of birth: 22 October 1955 (age 71)
- Place of birth: Iñapari, Peru

International career
Years	Team	Apps	(Gls)
1983–1985	Peru	12	(0)

Jorge Nelson Ramírez (born 22 October 1955) is a Peruvian footballer. He played in 12 matches for the Peru national football team from 1983 to 1985. He was also part of Peru's squad for the 1983 Copa América tournament.
