= José Vega (Ecuadorian footballer) =

Ecuadorian footballer (born 1958)

Personal information
- Date of birth: 14 February 1958 (age 68)
- Place of birth: Quito, Ecuador

International career
Years	Team	Apps	(Gls)
1983–1987	Ecuador	9	(1)

José Vega (born 14 February 1958) is an Ecuadorian footballer. He played in nine matches for the Ecuador national football team from 1983 to 1987. He was also part of Ecuador's squad for the 1983 Copa América tournament.
