= Nelson Agresta =

Uruguayan footballer (born 1955)

Personal information
- Full name: Nelson Agresta del Cerro
- Date of birth: 2 August 1955 (age 71)
- Place of birth: Montevideo, Uruguay
- Position: Midfielder

Senior career*
Years	Team	Apps	(Gls)
1970–1971	Racing Montevideo		
1972–1974	Liverpool Montevideo		
1975–1976	Estudiantes	6	(0)
1976	Defensor		
1977	Argentinos Juniors	33	(0)
1978–1981	Nacional	64	(2)
1981	→ River Plate Montevideo (loan)	31	(1)
1982–1984	Sud América	30	(1)
1984	San Luis	13	(1)
1985	Progreso		
1986	LDU Portoviejo		
1987	Sportivo Italiano		
1987	Ideal		
1988	Iván Mayo		

International career
1979–1983	Uruguay	34	(1)

Managerial career
- 1992: Sud América
- 1995: Basáñez
- 1996: Tosu Futures
- 1997: Villa Española
- 2000–2002: Tianjin Teda
- 2014: Hebei Zhongji
Medal record
Representing Uruguay
Copa América
Winner	1983
- * Club domestic league appearances and goals

Nelson Agresta del Cerro (born August 2, 1955, in Montevideo, Uruguay) is a Uruguayan former footballer, who played for clubs of Uruguay, Argentina, Chile and Ecuador and the Uruguay national football team.

== Teams ==
- (Uruguay) Racing Club de Montevideo 1970–1971
- (Uruguay) Liverpool Montevideo 1972–1974
- (Argentina) Estudiantes de La Plata 1975–1976
- (Uruguay) Defensor 1976
- (Argentina) Argentinos Juniors 1977
- (Uruguay) Nacional 1978–1980
- (Uruguay) River Plate Montevideo 1981
- (Uruguay) Sud América 1982–1984
- (Chile) San Luis de Quillota 1984
- (Uruguay) Progreso 1985
- (Ecuador) LDU Portoviejo 1986
- (Uruguay) Sportivo Italiano 1987
- (Uruguay) Club Atlético Ideal 1987
- (Chile) Iván Mayo 1988

== Personal life ==
Agresta have three daughters. His grandsons Nahuel Martínez and the brothers Alessandro and Piero Martini have played football at youth level. The first one has played for Uruguayan side La Rinconada and Spanish side CF Gandia and the other two have played for Spanish side UD Portuarios.

== Titles ==
- Defensor Sporting 1976 (Uruguayan Primera División Championship)
- Uruguay 1983 (Copa América)
