= Israel Rodríguez (Ecuadorian footballer) =

Ecuadorian footballer (born 1960)

Personal information
- Date of birth: 16 November 1960 (age 65)

International career
Years	Team	Apps	(Gls)
1983–1985	Ecuador	11	(0)

Israel Rodríguez (born 16 November 1960) is an Ecuadorian footballer. He played in eleven matches for the Ecuador national football team from 1983 to 1985. He was also part of Ecuador's squad for the 1983 Copa América tournament.
