= Pedro Antonio Blanco =

Spanish military officer

Pedro Blanco
- Born: Pedro Antonio Blanco; 12 June 1952; Spain
- Died: 21 January 2000 (aged 47); Madrid, Spain
- Occupation: Spanish lieutenant

Pedro Antonio Blanco (12 June 1952 – 21 January 2000) was a lieutenant colonel of the Spanish Army.

He was killed by a car bomb placed by the separatist group ETA, an attack that ended a 14-month truce.
