= Darío Figueredo =

Paraguayan footballer (born 1957)

Personal information
- Full name: Darío Isaac Figueredo Legal
- Date of birth: 2 July 1957 (age 69)
- Place of birth: Colonia Independencia, Paraguay
- Height: 1.72 m (5 ft 8 in)
- Positions: Right midfielder; right back

Senior career*
| Years | Team | Apps | (Gls) |
| 1975–1985 | Cerro Porteño | | |
| 1986–1987 | Sportivo Luqueño | | |
| 1988–1992 | Nacional | | |

International career
| 1983 | Paraguay | 12 | (0) |
- * Club domestic league appearances and goals

Darío Isaac Figueredo Legal (born 2 July 1957 in Colonia Independencia) is a Paraguayan former right midfielder.

== Honours ==
- Cerro Porteño
  - Paraguayan Primera División: 1977
- Nacional
  - Paraguayan División Intermedia: 1989
