= Juan José Tan =

Peruvian football manager (born 1944)

Personal information
- Full name: Juan José Tan Cantinet
- Date of birth: 26 August 1944 (age 82)
- Place of birth: Lima, Peru
- Height: 1.78 m (5 ft 10 in)

Managerial career
- Years: Team
- 1970–1971: A.D.O.
- 1979: Alianza Lima
- 1980: Peru (interim)
- 1981: Deportivo Municipal
- 1982: FBC Melgar
- 1983: Peru
- 1983: Universitario (interim)
- 1984–1985: Alianza Lima
- 1986: Juventud La Palma
- 1987: Internazionale San Borja
- 1988: Deportivo AELU
- 1989–1990: Deportivo Municipal
- 1990–1991: Internazionale San Borja
- 2006–2007: Deportivo Municipal
- 2008: Universidad San Marcos

Juan José Tan Cantinet (born on 26 August 1944) is a Peruvian football manager. He was twice the manager of Peru in the early 1980s.

== Biography ==
A physical trainer by profession, Tan joined the Peruvian national team's coaching staff during the 1974 World Cup qualifiers (under Roberto Scarone) and then during the 1975 Copa América (under Marcos Calderón). Although he had already coached A.D.O. in the early 1970s, he managed Alianza Lima in 1979. In 1980, he served as interim coach of Peru, leading the team for one match against Uruguay on 18 July 1980 (result 0–0).

A key figure on the bench during Deportivo Municipal's second-place finish in the league in 1981 – he was replaced at the end of the season by Marcos Calderón – Tan took charge of the Peruvian national team during the 1983 Copa América where the team reached the semi-finals.

Aside from his experience with the national team, Tan managed numerous clubs in the 1980s (FBC Melgar, Alianza Lima, Universitario de Deportes, Deportivo AELU, Internazionale San Borja, Deportivo Municipal). Less active in the 1990s, he returned to the bench of Deportivo Municipal in 2006-2007, where he won the second division championship in 2006. His last coaching experience was in 2008 with Universidad San Marcos.

== Honours ==
Deportivo Municipal

- Peruvian Segunda División: 2006
