= Carlos Arias (footballer, born 1956) =

Bolivian footballer (born 1956)

Personal information
- Full name: Carlos Arias Torrico
- Date of birth: 26 August 1956 (age 70)
- Place of birth: Cliza, Bolivia

International career
Years	Team	Apps	(Gls)
1983–1989	Bolivia	17	(0)

Carlos Arias Torrico (born 26 August 1956) is a Bolivian footballer. He played in 17 matches for the Bolivia national football team from 1983 to 1989. He was also part of Bolivia's squad for the 1983 Copa América tournament.
