= Daniel Nikolac =

Venezuelan footballer (born 1961)

Personal information
- Full name: Daniel Nikolac Penz
- Date of birth: 11 May 1961
- Date of death: 31 May 2020 (aged 59)

International career
Years	Team	Apps	(Gls)
1985–1989	Venezuela	5	(0)

Daniel Nikolac Penz (11 May 1961 – 31 May 2020) was a Venezuelan footballer. He played in five matches for the Venezuela national football team from 1985 to 1989. He was also part of Venezuela's squad for the 1983 Copa América tournament.
