= Rolando Coimbra =

Bolivian footballer (born 1960)

Personal information
- Date of birth: 25 February 1960 (age 66)
- Place of birth: Montero, Bolivia

International career
Years	Team	Apps	(Gls)
1983–1987	Bolivia	15	(0)

Rolando Coimbra (born 25 February 1960) is a Bolivian footballer. He played in 15 matches for the Bolivia national football team from 1983 to 1987. He was also part of Bolivia's squad for the 1983 Copa América tournament.
