= José Aguayo =

Peruvian footballer (born 1955)

Personal information
- Date of birth: 25 October 1955 (age 71)

International career
Years	Team	Apps	(Gls)
1983	Peru	5	(0)

José Aguayo (born 25 October 1955) is a Peruvian footballer. He played in five matches for the Peru national football team in 1983. He was also part of Peru's squad for the 1983 Copa América tournament.
