= Nolberto Molina =

Colombian footballer and manager (born 1953)

Personal information
- Full name: Nolberto Molina Flórez
- Date of birth: 5 January 1953 (age 73)
- Place of birth: Palmira, Valle del Cauca, Colombia
- Position: Defender

Senior career*
Years	Team	Apps	(Gls)
1973–1977	Independiente Medellín		
1977–1982	Once Caldas		
1983–1985	Millonarios		
1986–1987	Atlético Nacional		
1988	Independiente Medellín		
Total		596	(46)

International career
1983–1987	Colombia	18	(1)

Managerial career
- 1993: Alianza Petrolera
- 1995: Independiente Medellín
- * Club domestic league appearances and goals

Nolberto Molina Flórez (born 5 January 1953) is a former Colombian football defender and manager.

== Career ==
Born in Palmira, Valle del Cauca, Molina played club football for Independiente Medellín, Once Caldas, Millonarios and Atlético Nacional, appearing in 596 matches, and scoring 46 goals. Molina began his career with Medellín and joined Millonarios in 1983, where he was involved in organizing a Colombian football players' union (Afucol).

Molina made several appearances for the Colombia national football team, including at Copa América 1983 and Copa América 1987. In total, he made 18 appearances and scored one goal.

After he retired from playing, Molina became a football coach. He managed Independiente Medellín during 1995.
