= Tenente Coimbra =

Brazilian politician (born 1991)

Member of the Legislative Assembly of São Paulo
- Incumbent
- Assumed office 15 March 2019

Personal details
- Born: 8 January 1991 (age 35)
- Party: Liberal Party (since 2022)

Matheus Coimbra Martins de Aguiar (born 8 January 1991), better known as Tenente Coimbra, is a Brazilian politician serving as a member of the Legislative Assembly of São Paulo since 2019. He previously served in the Brazilian Army for nine years.
