= Pedro Blanco (footballer) =

Colombian footballer (born 1958)

Personal information
- Date of birth: 28 June 1958 (age 68)
- Position: Defender

International career
Years	Team	Apps	(Gls)
1983	Colombia	1	(0)

Pedro Blanco (born 28 June 1958) is a Colombian footballer. He played in one match for the Colombia national football team in 1983. He was also part of Colombia's squad for the 1983 Copa América tournament.
