= David Paniagua =

Bolivian footballer (born 1959)

Personal information
- Full name: David Augusto Paniagua Yépez
- Date of birth: 30 April 1959 (age 67)
- Position: Forward

Senior career*
Years	Team	Apps	(Gls)
1978–1980	The Strongest		
1981–1985	Blooming		
1986	Bolívar		

International career
1979–1985	Bolivia	5	(1)
- * Club domestic league appearances and goals

David Augusto Paniagua Yépez (born 30 April 1959) is a Bolivian footballer. He played in five matches for the Bolivia national football team from 1979 to 1985. He was also part of Bolivia's squad for the 1979 Copa América tournament.
