= Óscar Arriaza =

Chilean footballer (born 1956)

Personal information
- Date of birth: 30 January 1956 (age 70)

International career
| Years | Team | Apps | (Gls) |
| 1983 | Chile | 8 | (0) |

Óscar Arriaza (born 30 January 1956) is a Chilean footballer. He played in eight matches for the Chile national football team in 1983. He was also part of Chile's squad for the 1983 Copa América tournament.
