= Carlos Urizar =

Bolivian footballer (born 1957)

Personal information
- Date of birth: 16 January 1957 (age 69)

International career
Years	Team	Apps	(Gls)
1983	Bolivia	8	(0)

Carlos Urizar (born 16 January 1957) is a Bolivian footballer. He played in eight matches for the Bolivia national football team in 1983. He was also part of Bolivia's squad for the 1983 Copa América tournament.
