= Eduardo Rey Muñoz =

Peruvian footballer (born 1957)

Personal information
- Date of birth: 7 August 1957 (age 69)

International career
Years	Team	Apps	(Gls)
1980–1989	Peru	25	(1)

Eduardo Rey Muñoz (born 7 August 1957) is a Peruvian footballer. He played in 25 matches for the Peru national football team from 1980 to 1989. He was also part of Peru's squad for the 1983 Copa América tournament.
