= Eduardo Muñoz Inchausti =

Chilean politician (born 1975)

Eduardo Muñoz

Undersecretary of Culture
- In office 11 December 2008 – 11 March 2010
- President: Michelle Bachelet
- Preceded by: Arturo Barrios

Personal details
- Born: 1 January 1975 (age 51) Valparaíso, Chile
- Party: Socialist Party; Unir Movement
- Education: University of Valparaíso (BA); Pontifical Catholic University of Valparaíso (MA)
- Profession: Public Administrator

Eduardo Muñoz Inchausti (born 1975) is a Chilean politician who served as Undersecretary of Culture during the first government of Michelle Bachelet (2006−2010).
