= Luis Alberto Acosta =

Uruguayan footballer (born 1959)

Personal information
- Date of birth: 15 December 1959 (age 66)
- Place of birth: Montevideo, Uruguay
- Positions: Left winger; midfielder

Senior career*
Years	Team	Apps	(Gls)
1977–1984	Montevideo Wanderers		
1984–1985	América		
1985–1986	River Plate		
1986	Peñarol		
1986–1987	Cobras de Querétaro		
1987–1988	Montevideo Wanderers		
1989	Filanbanco		
1990	Barcelona		
1991–1992	LDU de Quito		
1993	Huracán Buceo		
1994	Deportivo Cuenca		
1995	Montevideo Wanderers		

International career
1983–1988	Uruguay	15	(1)

Managerial career
- 2008: Montevideo Wanderers
- * Club domestic league appearances and goals

Luis Alberto Acosta (born 15 December 1959) is a Uruguayan footballer.

== Career ==
He played in 15 matches for the Uruguay national football team from 1983 to 1988. He was also part of Uruguay's squad for the 1983 Copa América tournament.
