= Juan Caicedo (footballer, born 1955) =

Colombian footballer

Personal information
- Date of birth: 8 March 1955 (age 71)

International career
Years	Team	Apps	(Gls)
1981–1983	Colombia	15	(0)

Juan Caicedo (born 8 March 1955) is a Colombian footballer. He played in 15 matches for the Colombia national football team from 1981 to 1983. He was also part of Colombia's squad for the 1983 Copa América tournament.
