= São José da Lapa =

Brazilian municipality

Coordinates: 19°42′03″S 43°57′18″W

- Municipality
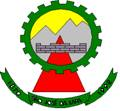
- Coat of arms
- Interactive map of São José da Lapa
- Country: Brazil
- State: Minas Gerais
- Region: Southeast

Population (2022 Census)
  - Total: 26,090
  - Estimate (2025): 28,087
- Time zone: UTC−3 (BRT)

Location of São José da Lapa within Minas Gerais

São José da Lapa is a Brazilian municipality located in the state of Minas Gerais. The city belongs to the mesoregion Metropolitana de Belo Horizonte and to the microregion of Belo Horizonte. As of 2025, the estimated population was 28,087.

== See also ==
- List of municipalities in Minas Gerais
