= Jorge Camacho (footballer) =

Bolivian footballer (born 1956)

Personal information
- Date of birth: 13 March 1956 (age 70)

International career
Years	Team	Apps	(Gls)
1980–1983	Bolivia	5	(1)

Jorge Camacho (born 13 March 1956) is a Bolivian footballer. He played in five matches for the Bolivia national football team from 1980 to 1983. He was also part of Bolivia's squad for the 1983 Copa América tournament.
