= Alberto Santelli =

Uruguayan footballer (born 1953)

Personal information
- Full name: Alberto Raúl Santelli Fernández
- Date of birth: 14 June 1953 (age 73)
- Place of birth: Montevideo, Uruguay
- Position: Forward

International career
Years	Team	Apps	(Gls)
1975–1983	Uruguay	13	(2)

Alberto Santelli (born 14 June 1953) is a Uruguayan footballer. He played in 13 matches for the Uruguay national football team from 1975 to 1983. He was also part of Uruguay's squad for the 1983 Copa América tournament.
