= José Fernández (footballer, born 1939) =

Peruvian footballer

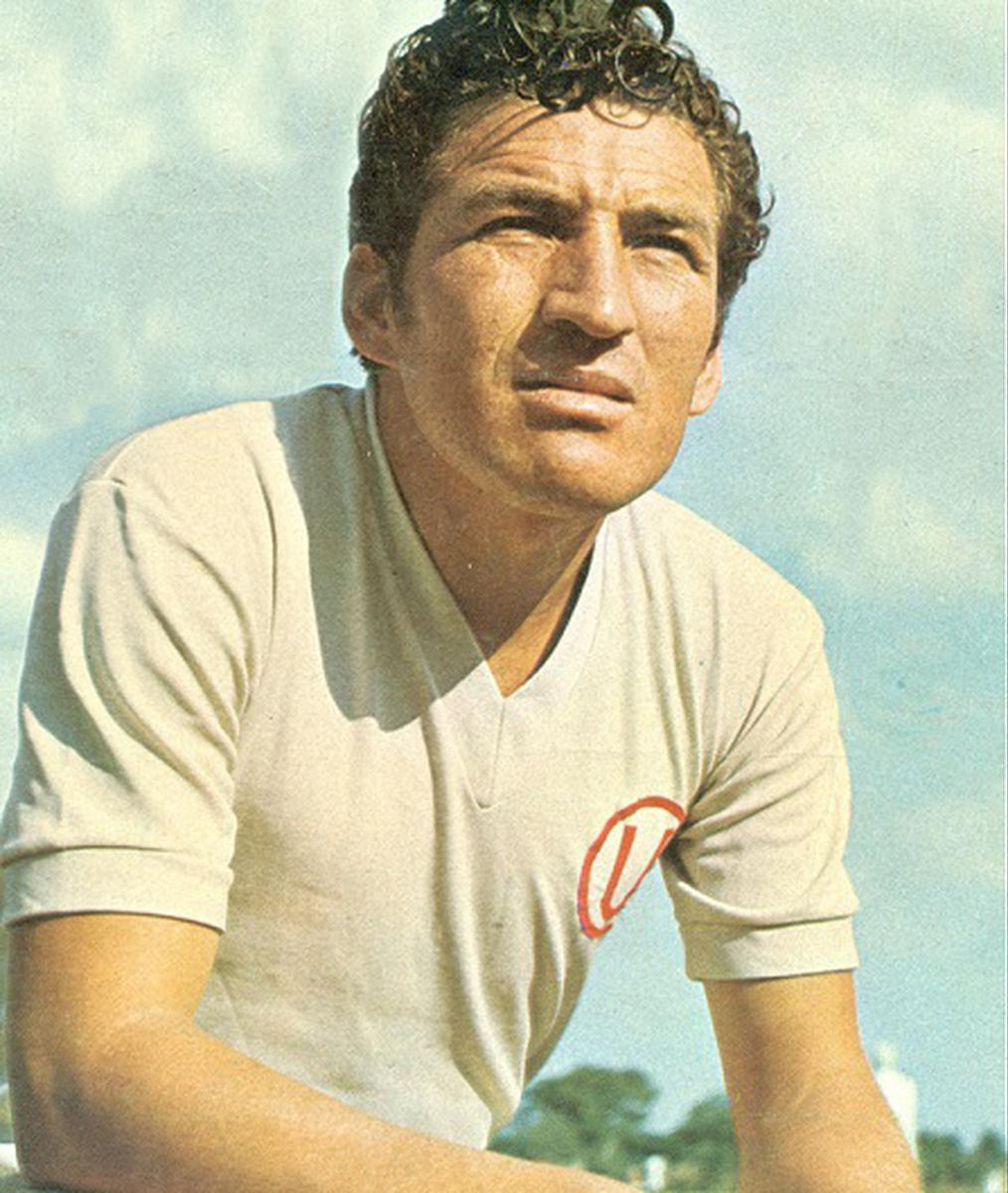

Personal information
- Full name: José Fernández Santini
- Date of birth: 14 February 1939 (age 87)
- Place of birth: Peru
- Height: 1.76 m (5 ft 9 in)
- Position: Defender

Senior career*
Years	Team	Apps	(Gls)
1963–1970	Universitario		
1971–1973	Defensor Lima		

International career
1959–1973	Peru	37	(2)
- * Club domestic league appearances and goals

José Fernández Santini (born 14 February 1939) is a Peruvian former footballer who played as a defender. He represented the Peru national football team between 1959 and 1973, gaining 37 caps and scoring 2 goals. He was part of the Peru squad for the 1970 World Cup.

At club level, Fernández played for Universitario and Defensor Lima.
