= Pedro Requena (footballer, born 1961) =

Peruvian footballer

Personal information
- Date of birth: 29 June 1961 (age 65)
- Place of birth: Callao, Peru

International career
Years	Team	Apps	(Gls)
1983–1992	Peru	51	(1)

Pedro Requena (born 29 June 1961) is a Peruvian footballer. He played in 51 matches for the Peru national football team from 1983 to 1992. He was also part of Peru's squad for the 1983 Copa América tournament.
