= Galo Vásquez =

Ecuadorian footballer (born 1957)

Personal information
- Full name: Galo Fidian Vásquez Gracia
- Date of birth: December 31, 1957 (age 68)
- Place of birth: Esmeraldas, Ecuador
- Height: 1.60 m (5 ft 3 in)
- Position: Attacking midfielder

Senior career*
Years	Team	Apps	(Gls)
1975–1978	Club 5 de Agosto		
1978–1990	Barcelona SC		
1990–1991	Delfín		

International career
1983–1987	Ecuador	12	(1)
- * Club domestic league appearances and goals

Galo Fidian Vásquez Gracia (born 31 December 1957) is a former Ecuadorian footballer who plays midfield for Barcelona S.C.

== Career ==
=== Club 5 de Agosto ===
==== 1975–1978 ====
Early start at Club 5 de Agosto school until transferred to Barcelona Sporting Club. He was a high school student and the institution involved in local amateur football tournaments.

When Barcelona showed interest in his services came to test his partner Emeterio Vera in 1978. The Peruvian Marcos Calderon (+), whom he remembers as a perfectionist, was the canary team coach and gave the nod for him to stay.

=== Barcelona Sporting Club ===
==== 1978–1990 ====
At the "Idolo del Astillero", he received 5 national titles and was 3 times runner-up. He did not play the first Copa Libertadores final with Barcelona because there was no agreement with the leadership to renew the contract and had to leave the club.

Twelve years after their retirement has elapsed, the midfielder said that football had left him "many friends, two houses (one in Guayaquil and one in Esmeraldas), a vehicle and the greatest treasure of which [he is] very proud: his family."

He does not know why he got the nickname of Mafalda. He just remembers that it was at a friends gathering he was named Mafalda: Galo ‘Mafalda’ Vásquez en su billar.

=== Delfín Sporting Club ===
==== 1990–1991 ====
After that season he retired.

== Honors ==
=== Club ===
Barcelona S.C.

- Serie A (5): 1980, 1981, 1985, 1987, 1989
