= Washington González =

Uruguayan footballer (born 1955)

Personal information
- Date of birth: 6 December 1955 (age 70)
- Place of birth: Florida (uruguay)
- Height: 1.74 m (5 ft 9 in)
- Position: Left-back

Senior career*
Years	Team	Apps	(Gls)
	Defensor sporting	236	(24)
3	Nacional	88	(5)

International career
1978–1983	Uruguay	32	(0)
- * Club domestic league appearances and goals

Washington González (born 6 December 1955) is a Uruguayan footballer. He played in 32 matches for the Uruguay national football team from 1978 to 1983. He was also part of Uruguay's squad for the 1979 Copa América tournament.
