= Eduardo Malásquez =

Peruvian footballer

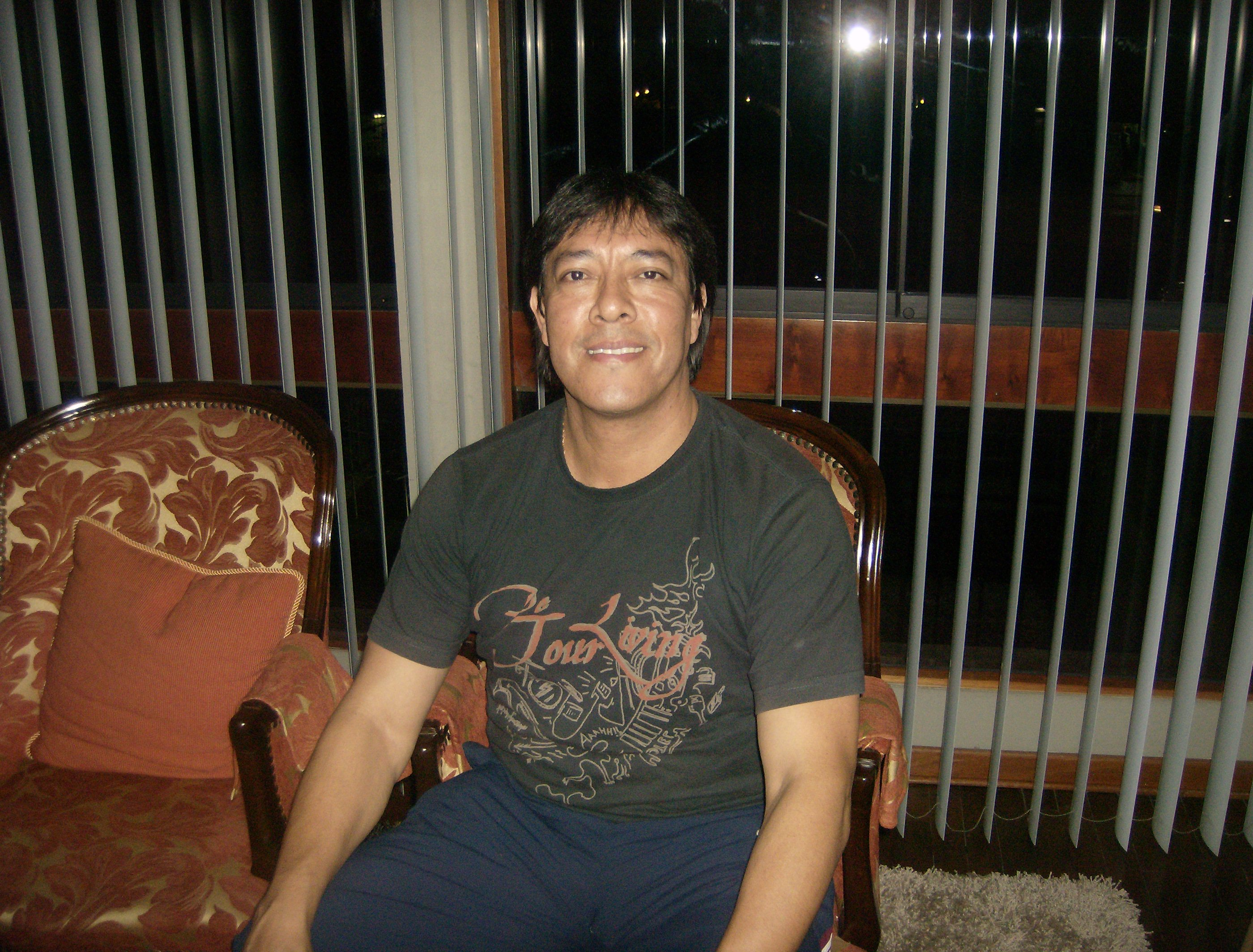
- Malasquez in June 2011

Personal information
- Full name: Eduardo Hugo Malásquez Maldonado
- Date of birth: 30 August 1958 (age 68)
- Place of birth: Lima, Peru
- Position: Midfielder

Senior career*
Years	Team	Apps	(Gls)
1976–1982	Deportivo Municipal		
1982–1984	Medellín		
1985	Deportivo Municipal		
1986	Medellín		
1987	Universitario		
1988–1989	Atlas	10	(0)

International career
1979–1987	Peru	33	(2)
- * Club domestic league appearances and goals

Eduardo Hugo Malásquez Maldonado (born 13 October 1957) is a Peruvian former footballer who played at both professional and international levels, as a midfielder.

== Career ==
Born in Lima, Malásquez played club football in Peru, Colombia and Mexico for Deportivo Municipal , Medellín, Universitario and Atlas. Malásquez earned 33 international caps for Peru between 1979 and 1987. He was a squad member at the 1982 FIFA World Cup, and played in one match during 1986 FIFA World Cup qualification.
