= 1983 Copa América =

Tournament details
- Dates: 10 August – 4 November
- Teams: 10 (from 1 confederation)

Final positions
- Champions: Uruguay (12th title)
- Runners-up: Brazil
- Third place: Peru; Paraguay

Tournament statistics
- Matches played: 24
- Goals scored: 55 (2.29 per match)
- Attendance: 1,013,889 (42,245 per match)
- Top scorer(s): (Uruguay) Carlos Aguilera (Argentina) Jorge Luis Burruchaga (Brazil) Roberto Dinamite (3 goals each)
- Best player: (Uruguay) Enzo Francéscoli

The 1983 Copa América football tournament was played between 10 August and 4 November, with all ten CONMEBOL members participating. Defending champions Paraguay received a bye into the semi-finals.

The cup was won by Uruguay, that beat Brazil in the final match. This achievement ended Uruguay's 16-year streak without an official championship since the 1967 South American Championship, and qualified the Celestes to play the first Artemio Franchi Trophy in 1985 against France, winner of the UEFA Euro 1984.

== Group stage ==
The teams were drawn into three groups, consisting of three teams each. Each team played twice (home and away) against the other teams in their group, with two points for a win, one point for a draw, and zero points for a loss. The winner of each group advanced to the semi-finals.

Paraguay qualified automatically as holders for the semifinal.

=== Group A ===
Team	Pld	W	D	L	GF	GA	GD	Pts
Uruguay	4	3	0	1	7	4	+3	6
Chile	4	2	1	1	8	2	+6	5
Venezuela	4	0	1	3	1	10	−9	1

1 September 1983

Uruguay	2–1	Chile
Acevedo 45'; Morena 63' (pen.)		Orellana 76'

Estadio Centenario, Montevideo
Attendance: 22,346
Referee: Coelho (Brazil)

4 September 1983

Uruguay	3–0	Venezuela
Cabrera 29'; Morena 57' (pen.); Luzardo 68'

Estadio Centenario, Montevideo
Attendance: 52,567
Referee: González (Paraguay)

8 September 1983

Chile	5–0	Venezuela
Arriaza 22'; Dubó 25'; Aravena 35', 83'; Espinoza 51'

Estadio Nacional, Santiago
Attendance: 20,000
Referee: Labo (Peru)

11 September 1983

Chile	2–0	Uruguay
Dubó 9'; Letelier 80'

Estadio Nacional, Santiago
Attendance: 55,000
Referee: Nitti (Argentina)

18 September 1983

Venezuela	1–2	Uruguay
Febles 77'		Santelli 74'; Aguilera 87'

Brígido Iriarte Stadium, Caracas
Attendance: 3,000
Referee: Montalván (Peru)

21 September 1983

Venezuela	0–0	Chile

Brígido Iriarte Stadium, Caracas
Attendance: 3,000
Referee: Jácome (Ecuador)

=== Group B ===
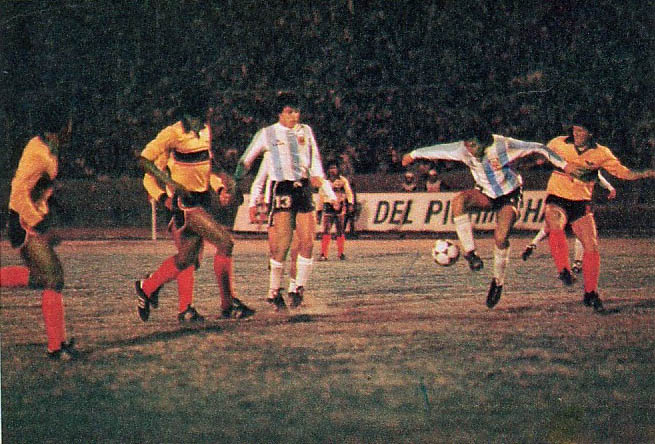
Argentina playing Ecuador in Quito

Team	Pld	W	D	L	GF	GA	GD	Pts
Brazil	4	2	1	1	6	1	+5	5
Argentina	4	1	3	0	5	4	+1	5
Ecuador	4	0	2	2	4	10	−6	2

10 August 1983

Ecuador	2–2	Argentina
Vásquez 68'; Vega 89'		Burruchaga 40', 51'

Estadio Olímpico Atahualpa, Quito
Attendance: 50,000
Referee: Aristizábal (Colombia)

17 August 1983

Ecuador	0–1	Brazil
	Report	Roberto 14'

Estadio Olímpico Atahualpa, Quito
Attendance: 40,000
Referee: Postigo (Peru)

24 August 1983

Argentina	1–0	Brazil
Gareca 55'	Report

Estadio Monumental, Buenos Aires
Attendance: 70,000
Referee: Cardellino (Uruguay)

1 September 1983

Brazil	5–0	Ecuador
Renato Gaúcho 12'; Roberto 46', 55'; Éder 58'; Tita 60'	Report

Estádio Serra Dourada, Goiânia
Attendance: 26,688
Referee: Da Rosa (Uruguay)

7 September 1983

Argentina	2–2	Ecuador
Ramos 50'; Burruchaga 90+' (pen.)		Quiñónez 44'; Maldonado 90' (pen.)

Estadio Monumental, Buenos Aires
Attendance: 40,000
Referee: Ortubé (Bolivia)

14 September 1983

Brazil	0–0	Argentina
	Report

Maracanã Stadium, Rio de Janeiro
Attendance: 53,921
Referee: Lira (Chile)

=== Group C ===
Team	Pld	W	D	L	GF	GA	GD	Pts
Peru	4	2	2	0	6	4	+2	6
Colombia	4	1	2	1	5	5	0	4
Bolivia	4	0	2	2	4	6	−2	2

14 August 1983

Bolivia	0–1	Colombia
		Valderrama 73'

Estadio Hernando Siles, La Paz
Attendance: 40,000
Referee: González (Paraguay)

17 August 1983

Peru	1–0	Colombia
Navarro 77'

Estadio Nacional, Lima
Attendance: 30,000
Referee: Martínez Bazán (Uruguay)

21 August 1983

Bolivia	1–1	Peru
Romero 65'		Navarro 89'

Estadio Hernando Siles, La Paz
Attendance: 37,738
Referee: Romero (Argentina)

28 August 1983

Colombia	2–2	Peru
Prince 46'; Fiorillo 69'		Malásquez 25' (pen.); Caballero 85'

Estadio El Campín, Bogotá
Attendance: 50,000
Referee: Coelho (Brazil)

31 August 1983

Colombia	2–2	Bolivia
Valderrama 2'; Molina 60' (pen.)		Melgar 78'; Rojas 80'

Estadio El Campín, Bogotá
Attendance: 45,000
Referee: Vergara (Venezuela)

4 September 1983

Peru	2–1	Bolivia
Leguía 6'; Caballero 21'		Paniagua 46'

Estadio Nacional, Lima
Attendance: 50,000
Referee: Budge (Chile)

== Knockout stage ==
Semi-finals
Peru	0	1
Uruguay	1	1
Paraguay	1	0
Brazil (by draw)	1	0

Final
Uruguay	2	1
Brazil	0	1

=== Semi-finals ===
13 October 1983

Peru	0–1	Uruguay
		Aguilera 65'

Estadio Nacional, Lima
Attendance: 28,000
Referee: Vásquez (Chile)
20 October 1983

Uruguay	1–1	Peru
Cabrera 49'		Malásquez 24'

Estadio Centenario, Montevideo
Attendance: 56,350
Referee: Ithurralde (Argentina)

Uruguay won 3–1 on points.

13 October 1983

Paraguay	1–1	Brazil
Morel 70'	Report	Éder 88'

Defensores del Chaco, Asunción
Attendance: 49,199
Referee: Castro (Chile)
20 October 1983

Brazil	0–0	Paraguay
	Report

Parque de Sabiá, Uberlandia
Attendance: 48,433
Referee: Loustau (Argentina)

2–2 on points. Brazil won on a drawing of lots.

=== Final ===
27 October 1983

Uruguay	2–0	Brazil
Francescoli 41'; Diogo 80'

Estadio Centenario, Montevideo
Attendance: 58,714
Referee: Ortiz (Paraguay)
4 November 1983

Brazil	1–1	Uruguay
Jorginho 23'		Aguilera 77'

Estádio Fonte Nova, Salvador
Attendance: 83,933
Referee: Pérez (Peru)

Uruguay won 3–1 on points.

== Goal scorers ==
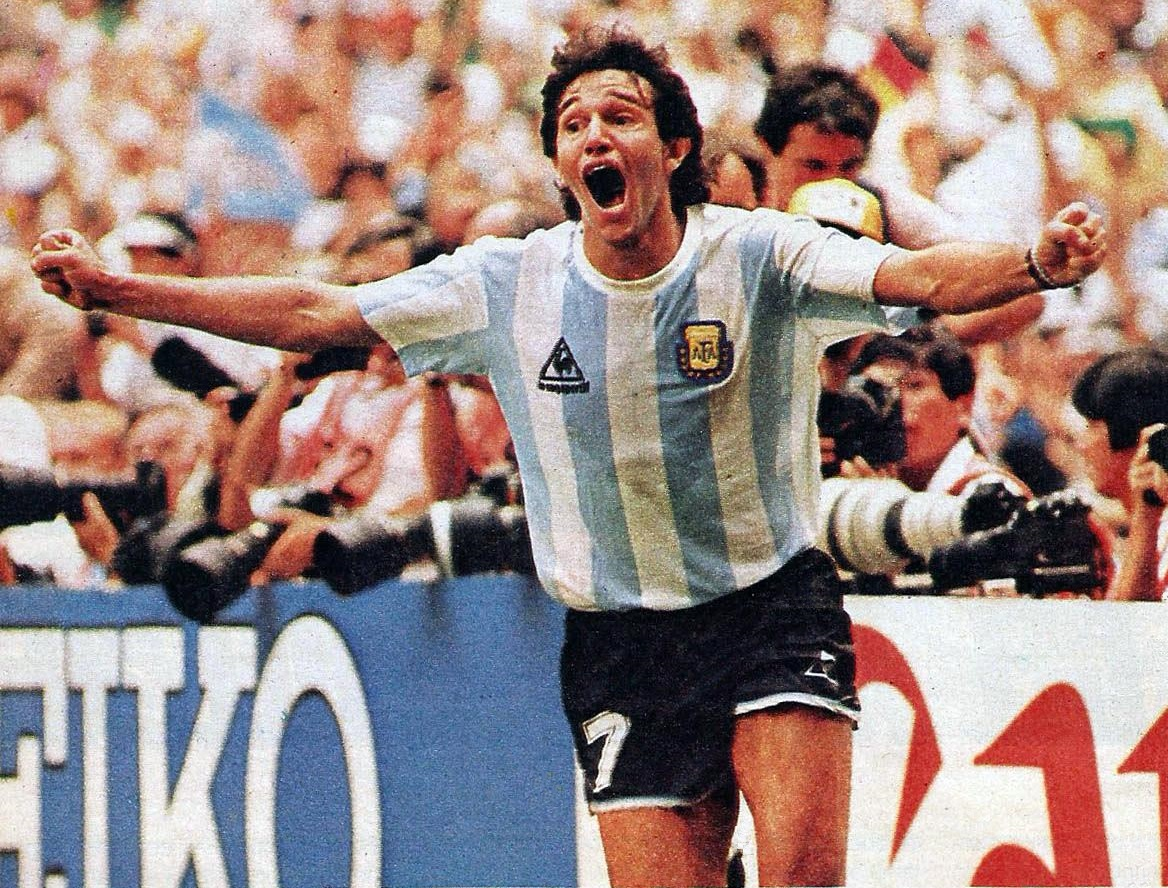
Jorge Burruchaga, one of the three top scorers

With three goals, Jorge Luis Burruchaga, Roberto Dinamite and Carlos Aguilera are the top scorers in the tournament. In total, 55 goals were scored by 40 different players, with none of them credited as own goal.

3 Goals

- (Argentina) Jorge Burruchaga
- (Brazil) Roberto Dinamite
- (Uruguay) Carlos Aguilera

2 Goals

- (Brazil) Éder
- (Chile) Jorge Aravena
- (Chile) Rodolfo Dubó
- (Colombia) Didí
- (Peru) Juan Caballero
- (Peru) Franco Navarro
- (Peru) Eduardo Malásquez
- (Uruguay) Fernando Morena
- (Uruguay) Wilmar Cabrera

1 Goal

- (Argentina) Ricardo Gareca
- (Argentina) Víctor Ramos
- (Bolivia) Milton Melgar
- (Bolivia) David Paniagua
- (Bolivia) Silvio Rojas
- (Bolivia) Erwin Romero
- (Brazil) Jorginho
- (Brazil) Renato Gaúcho
- (Brazil) Tita
- (Chile) Oscar Arriaza
- (Chile) Rubén Espinoza
- (Chile) Juan Carlos Letelier
- (Chile) Juan Carlos Orellana
- (Colombia) Fernando Fiorillo
- (Colombia) Nolberto Molina
- (Colombia) Miguel Augusto Prince
- (Ecuador) Hans Maldonado
- (Ecuador) Lupo Quiñónez
- (Ecuador) Galo Fidean Vázquez
- (Ecuador) José Jacinto Vega
- (Paraguay) Milciades Morel
- (Peru) Germán Leguía
- (Uruguay) Eduardo Acevedo
- (Uruguay) Víctor Diogo
- (Uruguay) Enzo Francescoli
- (Uruguay) Arsenio Luzardo
- (Uruguay) Alberto Santelli
- (Venezuela) Pedro Febles
