= 1978 FIFA World Cup squads =

Below are the squads for the 1978 FIFA World Cup final tournament in Argentina.

== Group 1 ==
=== Argentina ===
Head coach: César Luis Menotti

No.	Pos.	Player	Date of birth (age)	Caps	Club
1	MF	Norberto Alonso	4 January 1953 (aged 25)	6	(Argentina) River Plate
2	MF	Osvaldo Ardiles	3 August 1952 (aged 25)	33	(Argentina) Huracán
3	GK	Héctor Baley	16 November 1950 (aged 27)	10	(Argentina) Huracán
4	FW	Daniel Bertoni	14 March 1955 (aged 23)	16	(Argentina) Independiente
5	GK	Ubaldo Fillol	21 July 1950 (aged 27)	7	(Argentina) River Plate
6	MF	Américo Gallego	25 April 1955 (aged 23)	34	(Argentina) Newell's Old Boys
7	DF	Luis Galván	24 February 1948 (aged 30)	7	(Argentina) Talleres de Córdoba
8	MF	Rubén Galván	7 April 1952 (aged 26)	6	(Argentina) Independiente
9	FW	René Houseman	19 July 1953 (aged 24)	41	(Argentina) Huracán
10	FW	Mario Kempes	15 July 1954 (aged 23)	24	(Spain) Valencia
11	DF	Daniel Killer	21 December 1949 (aged 28)	21	(Argentina) Racing Club
12	MF	Omar Larrosa	18 November 1947 (aged 30)	9	(Argentina) Independiente
13	GK	Ricardo La Volpe	6 February 1952 (aged 26)	8	(Argentina) San Lorenzo
14	FW	Leopoldo Luque	3 May 1949 (aged 29)	27	(Argentina) River Plate
15	DF	Jorge Olguín	17 May 1952 (aged 26)	22	(Argentina) San Lorenzo
16	FW	Oscar Ortiz	8 April 1953 (aged 25)	15	(Argentina) River Plate
17	MF	Miguel Oviedo	12 October 1950 (aged 27)	6	(Argentina) Talleres de Córdoba
18	DF	Rubén Pagnanini	31 January 1949 (aged 29)	4	(Argentina) Independiente
19	DF	Daniel Passarella (captain)	25 May 1953 (aged 25)	18	(Argentina) River Plate
20	DF	Alberto Tarantini	3 December 1955 (aged 22)	26	Free agent (Note: Tarantini left clubless after a contractual dispute with Boca Juniors, six months before the World Cup.)
21	MF	José Daniel Valencia	3 October 1955 (aged 22)	16	(Argentina) Talleres de Córdoba
22	MF	Ricardo Villa	18 August 1952 (aged 25)	13	(Argentina) Racing Club

Note that this squad is numbered alphabetically by surname, unlike traditional numbering systems where the goalkeeper has shirt number 1 and so forth.

=== France ===
Head coach: Michel Hidalgo

No.	Pos.	Player	Date of birth (age)	Caps	Club
1	GK	Dominique Baratelli	26 December 1947 (aged 30)	18	(France) Nice
2	DF	Patrick Battiston	12 March 1957 (aged 21)	5	(France) Metz
3	DF	Maxime Bossis	26 June 1955 (aged 22)	11	(France) Nantes
4	DF	Gérard Janvion	21 August 1953 (aged 24)	15	(France) Saint-Étienne
5	DF	François Bracci	6 November 1951 (aged 26)	15	(France) Marseille
6	DF	Christian Lopez	15 March 1953 (aged 25)	12	(France) Saint-Étienne
7	DF	Patrice Rio	15 August 1948 (aged 29)	15	(France) Nantes
8	DF	Marius Trésor (captain)	15 January 1950 (aged 28)	36	(France) Marseille
9	MF	Dominique Bathenay	13 February 1954 (aged 24)	12	(France) Saint-Étienne
10	MF	Jean-Marc Guillou	20 December 1945 (aged 32)	18	(France) Nice
11	MF	Henri Michel	28 October 1947 (aged 30)	52	(France) Nantes
12	MF	Claude Papi	16 April 1949 (aged 29)	2	(France) Bastia
13	MF	Jean Petit	25 September 1949 (aged 28)	3	(France) Monaco
14	FW	Marc Berdoll	6 April 1953 (aged 25)	10	(France) Marseille
15	MF	Michel Platini	21 June 1955 (aged 22)	15	(France) Nancy
16	FW	Christian Dalger	19 December 1949 (aged 28)	5	(France) Monaco
17	FW	Bernard Lacombe	15 August 1952 (aged 25)	14	(France) Lyon
18	FW	Dominique Rocheteau	14 January 1955 (aged 23)	10	(France) Saint-Étienne
19	FW	Didier Six	21 August 1954 (aged 23)	15	(France) Lens
20	FW	Olivier Rouyer	1 December 1955 (aged 22)	9	(France) Nancy
21	GK	Jean-Paul Bertrand-Demanes	23 May 1952 (aged 26)	9	(France) Nantes
22	GK	Dominique Dropsy	9 December 1951 (aged 26)	0	(France) Strasbourg

=== Hungary ===
Head coach: Lajos Baróti

No.	Pos.	Player	Date of birth (age)	Caps	Club
1	GK	Sándor Gujdár	8 November 1951 (aged 26)	19	(Hungary) Budapest Honvéd
2	DF	Péter Török	18 April 1951 (aged 27)	29	(Hungary) Vasas
3	DF	István Kocsis	6 October 1949 (aged 28)	6	(Hungary) Budapest Honvéd
4	MF	József Tóth	2 December 1951 (aged 26)	25	(Hungary) Újpesti Dózsa
5	MF	Sándor Zombori	31 October 1951 (aged 26)	16	(Hungary) Vasas
6	DF	Zoltán Kereki (captain)	13 July 1953 (aged 24)	24	(Hungary) Haladás
7	FW	László Fazekas	15 October 1947 (aged 30)	71	(Hungary) Újpesti Dózsa
8	FW	Tibor Nyilasi	18 January 1955 (aged 23)	26	(Hungary) Ferencváros
9	FW	András Törőcsik	1 May 1955 (aged 23)	11	(Hungary) Újpesti Dózsa
10	MF	Sándor Pintér	18 July 1950 (aged 27)	32	(Hungary) Budapest Honvéd
11	FW	Béla Várady	12 April 1953 (aged 25)	28	(Hungary) Vasas
12	DF	Győző Martos	15 December 1949 (aged 28)	11	(Hungary) Ferencváros
13	MF	Károly Csapó	23 February 1952 (aged 26)	5	(Hungary) Tatabányai
14	DF	László Bálint	1 February 1948 (aged 30)	54	(Hungary) Ferencváros
15	DF	Tibor Rab	2 October 1955 (aged 22)	11	(Hungary) Ferencváros
16	MF	István Halász	12 October 1951 (aged 26)	3	(Hungary) Tatabányai
17	FW	László Pusztai	1 March 1946 (aged 32)	22	(Hungary) Ferencváros
18	MF	László Nagy	21 October 1949 (aged 28)	21	(Hungary) Újpesti Dózsa
19	FW	András Tóth	5 September 1949 (aged 28)	14	(Hungary) Újpesti Dózsa
20	MF	Ferenc Fülöp	22 February 1955 (aged 23)	0	(Hungary) MTK
21	GK	Ferenc Mészáros	11 April 1950 (aged 28)	13	(Hungary) Vasas
22	GK	László Kovács	24 April 1951 (aged 27)	12	(Hungary) Videoton

=== Italy ===
Head coach: Enzo Bearzot

No.	Pos.	Player	Date of birth (age)	Caps	Club
1	GK	Dino Zoff (captain)	28 February 1942 (aged 36)	63	(Italy) Juventus
2	DF	Mauro Bellugi	7 February 1950 (aged 28)	22	(Italy) Bologna
3	DF	Antonio Cabrini	8 October 1957 (aged 20)	0	(Italy) Juventus
4	DF	Antonello Cuccureddu	4 October 1949 (aged 28)	6	(Italy) Juventus
5	DF	Claudio Gentile	27 September 1953 (aged 24)	16	(Italy) Juventus
6	DF	Aldo Maldera	14 October 1953 (aged 24)	5	(Italy) Milan
7	DF	Lionello Manfredonia	27 November 1956 (aged 21)	3	(Italy) Lazio
8	DF	Gaetano Scirea	25 May 1953 (aged 25)	9	(Italy) Juventus
9	MF	Giancarlo Antognoni	1 April 1954 (aged 24)	28	(Italy) Fiorentina
10	MF	Romeo Benetti	20 October 1945 (aged 32)	40	(Italy) Juventus
11	MF	Eraldo Pecci	12 April 1955 (aged 23)	5	(Italy) Torino
12	GK	Paolo Conti	1 April 1950 (aged 28)	2	(Italy) Roma
13	MF	Patrizio Sala	16 June 1955 (aged 22)	5	(Italy) Torino
14	MF	Marco Tardelli	24 September 1954 (aged 23)	19	(Italy) Juventus
15	MF	Renato Zaccarelli	18 January 1951 (aged 27)	14	(Italy) Torino
16	MF	Franco Causio	1 February 1949 (aged 29)	33	(Italy) Juventus
17	MF	Claudio Sala	8 September 1947 (aged 30)	15	(Italy) Torino
18	FW	Roberto Bettega	27 December 1950 (aged 27)	16	(Italy) Juventus
19	FW	Francesco Graziani	16 December 1952 (aged 25)	22	(Italy) Torino
20	FW	Paolo Pulici	27 April 1950 (aged 28)	18	(Italy) Torino
21	FW	Paolo Rossi	23 September 1956 (aged 21)	2	(Italy) Vicenza
22	GK	Ivano Bordon	13 April 1951 (aged 27)	1	(Italy) Internazionale

Note: With the exception of the goalkeepers, who were assigned the traditional shirt numbers for the role (1, 12 and 22) the Italian team was numbered alphabetically within their respective positions – Defenders (from 2 to 8), Midfielders (from 9 to 15), Wingers (16 and 17) and Forwards (from 18 to 21).

== Group 2 ==
=== Mexico ===
Head coach: José Antonio Roca

No.	Pos.	Player	Date of birth (age)	Caps	Club
1	GK	José Pilar Reyes	12 October 1955 (aged 22)	9	(Mexico) Tigres UANL
2	DF	Manuel Nájera	20 December 1952 (aged 25)	18	(Mexico) Leones Negros
3	DF	Alfredo Tena	21 November 1956 (aged 21)	5	(Mexico) América
4	DF	Eduardo Ramos	8 November 1949 (aged 28)	36	(Mexico) Toluca
5	DF	Arturo Vázquez Ayala (captain)	26 June 1949 (aged 28)	34	(Mexico) Pumas UNAM
6	MF	Guillermo Mendizábal	8 October 1954 (aged 23)	5	(Mexico) Cruz Azul
7	MF	Antonio de la Torre	21 September 1951 (aged 26)	41	(Mexico) América
8	MF	Enrique López Zarza	25 October 1957 (aged 20)	5	(Mexico) Pumas UNAM
9	FW	Víctor Rangel	11 March 1957 (aged 21)	9	(Mexico) Guadalajara
10	FW	Cristóbal Ortega	25 July 1956 (aged 21)	9	(Mexico) América
11	FW	Hugo Sánchez	11 July 1958 (aged 19)	11	(Mexico) Pumas UNAM
12	DF	Jesús Martínez	7 June 1952 (aged 25)	0	(Mexico) América
13	DF	Rigoberto Cisneros	15 August 1953 (aged 24)	3	(Mexico) Toluca
14	DF	Carlos Gómez	16 August 1952 (aged 25)	5	(Mexico) León
15	DF	Ignacio Flores	31 July 1953 (aged 24)	4	(Mexico) Cruz Azul
16	MF	Javier Cárdenas	8 December 1952 (aged 25)	10	(Mexico) Toluca
17	MF	Leonardo Cuéllar	14 January 1952 (aged 26)	29	(Mexico) Pumas UNAM
18	MF	Gerardo Lugo	13 March 1955 (aged 23)	3	(Mexico) Atlante
19	FW	Hugo Rodríguez	14 March 1959 (aged 19)	2	(Mexico) Laguna
20	FW	Mario Medina	2 September 1952 (aged 25)	5	(Mexico) Toluca
21	FW	Raúl Isiordia	22 December 1952 (aged 25)	8	(Mexico) Atlético Español
22	GK	Pedro Soto	22 October 1952 (aged 25)	1	(Mexico) América

=== Poland ===
Head coach: Jacek Gmoch

No.	Pos.	Player	Date of birth (age)	Caps	Club
1	GK	Jan Tomaszewski	9 January 1948 (aged 30)	57	(Poland) ŁKS Łódź
2	FW	Włodzimierz Mazur	18 April 1954 (aged 24)	7	(Poland) Zagłębie Sosnowiec
3	DF	Henryk Maculewicz	24 April 1950 (aged 28)	14	(Poland) Wisła Kraków
4	DF	Antoni Szymanowski	13 January 1951 (aged 27)	61	(Poland) Wisła Kraków
5	MF	Adam Nawałka	23 October 1957 (aged 20)	11	(Poland) Wisła Kraków
6	DF	Jerzy Gorgoń	18 July 1949 (aged 28)	50	(Poland) Górnik Zabrze
7	FW	Andrzej Iwan	10 November 1959 (aged 18)	0	(Poland) Wisła Kraków
8	MF	Henryk Kasperczak	10 July 1946 (aged 31)	55	(Poland) Stal Mielec
9	DF	Władysław Żmuda	6 June 1954 (aged 23)	44	(Poland) Śląsk Wrocław
10	DF	Wojciech Rudy	24 October 1952 (aged 25)	14	(Poland) Zagłębie Sosnowiec
11	MF	Bohdan Masztaler	19 September 1949 (aged 28)	16	(Poland) ŁKS Łódź
12	MF	Kazimierz Deyna (captain)	23 October 1947 (aged 30)	91	(Poland) Legia Warsaw
13	MF	Janusz Kupcewicz	9 December 1955 (aged 22)	2	(Poland) Arka Gdynia
14	DF	Mirosław Justek	23 September 1948 (aged 29)	3	(Poland) Lech Poznań
15	FW	Marek Kusto	29 April 1954 (aged 24)	11	(Poland) Legia Warsaw
16	FW	Grzegorz Lato	8 April 1950 (aged 28)	59	(Poland) Stal Mielec
17	FW	Andrzej Szarmach	3 October 1950 (aged 27)	49	(Poland) Stal Mielec
18	MF	Zbigniew Boniek	3 March 1956 (aged 22)	21	(Poland) Widzew Łódź
19	FW	Włodzimierz Lubański	28 February 1947 (aged 31)	69	(Belgium) Lokeren
20	DF	Roman Wójcicki	8 January 1958 (aged 20)	1	(Poland) Odra Opole
21	GK	Zygmunt Kukla	21 January 1948 (aged 30)	5	(Poland) Stal Mielec
22	GK	Zdzisław Kostrzewa	26 October 1955 (aged 22)	1	(Poland) Zagłębie Sosnowiec

=== Tunisia ===
Head coach: Abdelmajid Chetali

No.	Pos.	Player	Date of birth (age)	Caps	Club
1	GK	Sadok "Attouga" Sassi	15 November 1945 (aged 32)	1	(Tunisia) Club Africain
2	DF	Mokhtar Dhouieb	23 March 1952 (aged 26)	2	(Tunisia) CS Sfaxien
3	DF	Ali Kaabi	15 November 1953 (aged 24)	2	(Tunisia) COT Tunis
4	MF	Khaled Gasmi	8 April 1953 (aged 25)	2	(Tunisia) CA Bizertin
5	DF	Mohsen "Jendoubi" Labidi	15 January 1954 (aged 24)	2	(Tunisia) Stade Tunis
6	MF	Néjib Ghommidh	12 March 1953 (aged 25)	2	(Tunisia) Club Africain
7	FW	Témime Lahzami (captain)	1 January 1949 (aged 29)	2	(Saudi Arabia) Al-Ittihad
8	MF	Hamadi Agrebi	20 March 1951 (aged 27)	1	(Tunisia) CS Sfaxien
9	FW	Mohamed Akid	5 July 1949 (aged 28)	2	(Tunisia) CS Sfaxien
10	MF	Tarak Dhiab	15 July 1954 (aged 23)	4	(Tunisia) Espérance
11	FW	Abderraouf Ben Aziza	23 September 1953 (aged 24)	2	(Tunisia) Étoile Sportive du Sahel
12	MF	Khemais Labidi	30 August 1950 (aged 27)	2	(Tunisia) JS Kairouan
13	FW	Néjib Limam	12 June 1953 (aged 24)	1	(Tunisia) Stade Tunis
14	FW	Slah Karoui	11 September 1951 (aged 26)	0	(Tunisia) Étoile Sportive du Sahel
15	FW	Mohamed Ben Moussa	5 April 1954 (aged 24)	?	(Tunisia) Club Africain
16	FW	Ohman Chehaibi	23 December 1954 (aged 23)	?	(Tunisia) JS Kairouan
17	DF	Ridha El Louze	27 April 1953 (aged 25)	?	(Tunisia) Sfax Railways Sports
18	DF	Kamel Chebli	9 March 1954 (aged 24)	1	(Tunisia) Club Africain
19	FW	Mokhtar Hasni	19 March 1952 (aged 26)	1	(Belgium) La Louvière
20	DF	Amor Jebali	24 December 1956 (aged 21)	1	(Tunisia) AS Marsa
21	GK	Lamine Ben Aziza	10 November 1952 (aged 25)	?	(Tunisia) Étoile Sportive du Sahel
22	GK	Mokhtar Naili	3 September 1953 (aged 24)	1	(Tunisia) Club Africain

=== West Germany ===
Head coach: Helmut Schön

No.	Pos.	Player	Date of birth (age)	Caps	Club
1	GK	Sepp Maier	28 February 1944 (aged 34)	83	(West Germany) Bayern Munich
2	DF	Berti Vogts (captain)	30 December 1946 (aged 31)	90	(West Germany) Borussia Mönchengladbach
3	DF	Bernard Dietz	22 March 1948 (aged 30)	24	(West Germany) MSV Duisburg
4	DF	Rolf Rüssmann	13 October 1950 (aged 27)	13	(West Germany) Schalke 04
5	DF	Manfred Kaltz	6 January 1953 (aged 25)	15	(West Germany) Hamburger SV
6	MF	Rainer Bonhof	29 March 1952 (aged 26)	34	(West Germany) Borussia Mönchengladbach
7	FW	Rüdiger Abramczik	18 February 1956 (aged 22)	12	(West Germany) Schalke 04
8	DF	Herbert Zimmermann	1 July 1954 (aged 23)	4	(West Germany) 1. FC Köln
9	FW	Klaus Fischer	27 December 1949 (aged 28)	12	(West Germany) Schalke 04
10	MF	Heinz Flohe	28 January 1948 (aged 30)	35	(West Germany) 1. FC Köln
11	FW	Karl-Heinz Rummenigge	25 September 1955 (aged 22)	12	(West Germany) Bayern Munich
12	DF	Hans-Georg Schwarzenbeck	3 April 1948 (aged 30)	44	(West Germany) Bayern Munich
13	DF	Harald Konopka	18 November 1952 (aged 25)	0	(West Germany) 1. FC Köln
14	FW	Dieter Müller	1 April 1954 (aged 24)	8	(West Germany) 1. FC Köln
15	MF	Erich Beer	9 December 1946 (aged 31)	20	(West Germany) Hertha BSC
16	MF	Bernhard Cullmann	1 November 1949 (aged 28)	22	(West Germany) 1. FC Köln
17	FW	Bernd Hölzenbein	9 March 1946 (aged 32)	37	(West Germany) Eintracht Frankfurt
18	MF	Gerd Zewe	13 June 1950 (aged 27)	0	(West Germany) Fortuna Düsseldorf
19	FW	Ronnie Worm	7 October 1953 (aged 24)	6	(West Germany) MSV Duisburg
20	MF	Hansi Müller	27 July 1957 (aged 20)	2	(West Germany) VfB Stuttgart
21	GK	Rudi Kargus	15 August 1952 (aged 25)	3	(West Germany) Hamburger SV
22	GK	Dieter Burdenski	26 November 1950 (aged 27)	2	(West Germany) Werder Bremen

== Group 3 ==
=== Austria ===
Head coach: Helmut Senekowitsch

No.	Pos.	Player	Date of birth (age)	Caps	Club
1	GK	Friedrich Koncilia	25 February 1948 (aged 30)	37	(Austria) SSW Innsbruck
2	DF	Robert Sara (captain)	9 June 1946 (aged 31)	37	Austria Wien
3	DF	Erich Obermayer	23 January 1953 (aged 25)	10	Austria Wien
4	DF	Gerhard Breitenberger	14 October 1954 (aged 23)	11	(Austria) VÖEST Linz
5	DF	Bruno Pezzey	3 February 1955 (aged 23)	25	(Austria) SSW Innsbruck
6	MF	Roland Hattenberger	7 December 1948 (aged 29)	23	(West Germany) VfB Stuttgart
7	MF	Josef Hickersberger	27 April 1948 (aged 30)	33	(West Germany) Fortuna Düsseldorf
8	MF	Herbert Prohaska	8 August 1955 (aged 22)	27	Austria Wien
9	FW	Hans Krankl	14 February 1953 (aged 25)	34	(Austria) Rapid Wien
10	FW	Wilhelm Kreuz	29 May 1949 (aged 29)	35	(Netherlands) Feyenoord
11	MF	Kurt Jara	14 October 1950 (aged 27)	29	(West Germany) MSV Duisburg
12	MF	Eduard Krieger	16 December 1946 (aged 31)	20	(Belgium) Club Brugge
13	MF	Günther Happich	28 January 1952 (aged 26)	4	(Austria) Wiener Sport-Club
14	DF	Heinrich Strasser	26 October 1948 (aged 29)	20	(Austria) Admira/Wacker
15	DF	Heribert Weber	28 June 1955 (aged 22)	7	(Austria) Sturm Graz
16	DF	Peter Persidis	8 March 1947 (aged 31)	7	(Austria) Rapid Wien
17	FW	Franz Oberacher	24 March 1954 (aged 24)	3	(Austria) SSW Innsbruck
18	FW	Walter Schachner	1 February 1957 (aged 21)	6	(Austria) DSV Alpine Donawitz
19	FW	Hans Pirkner	25 March 1946 (aged 32)	18	Austria Wien
20	MF	Ernst Baumeister	22 January 1957 (aged 21)	1	Austria Wien
21	GK	Erwin Fuchsbichler	27 March 1952 (aged 26)	2	(Austria) VÖEST Linz
22	GK	Hubert Baumgartner	25 February 1955 (aged 23)	1	Austria Wien

=== Brazil ===
Head coach: Cláudio Coutinho

No.	Pos.	Player	Date of birth (age)	Caps	Club
1	GK	Leão	11 July 1949 (aged 28)	50	(Brazil) Palmeiras
2	DF	Toninho	7 June 1948 (aged 29)	4	(Brazil) Flamengo
3	DF	Oscar	20 June 1954 (aged 23)	4	(Brazil) Ponte Preta
4	DF	Amaral	25 December 1954 (aged 23)	22	(Brazil) Guarani
5	MF	Toninho Cerezo	21 April 1955 (aged 23)	16	(Brazil) Atlético Mineiro
6	DF	Edinho	5 June 1955 (aged 22)	12	(Brazil) Fluminense
7	FW	Zé Sérgio	8 March 1957 (aged 21)	2	(Brazil) São Paulo
8	MF	Zico	3 March 1953 (aged 25)	21	(Brazil) Flamengo
9	FW	Reinaldo	11 January 1957 (aged 21)	12	(Brazil) Atlético Mineiro
10	MF	Rivellino (captain)	1 January 1946 (aged 32)	88	(Brazil) Fluminense
11	MF	Dirceu	15 June 1952 (aged 25)	14	(Brazil) Vasco da Gama
12	GK	Carlos	4 March 1956 (aged 22)	0	(Brazil) Ponte Preta
13	DF	Nelinho	26 July 1950 (aged 27)	13	(Brazil) Cruzeiro
14	DF	Abel	1 September 1952 (aged 25)	1	(Brazil) Vasco da Gama
15	DF	Polozzi	1 October 1955 (aged 22)	0	(Brazil) Ponte Preta
16	DF	Rodrigues Neto	6 December 1949 (aged 28)	7	(Brazil) Botafogo
17	MF	Batista	8 March 1955 (aged 23)	4	(Brazil) Internacional
18	FW	Gil	24 December 1950 (aged 27)	22	(Brazil) Botafogo
19	MF	Jorge Mendonça	6 June 1954 (aged 23)	0	(Brazil) Palmeiras
20	FW	Roberto Dinamite	13 April 1954 (aged 24)	20	(Brazil) Vasco da Gama
21	MF	Chicão	30 January 1949 (aged 29)	5	(Brazil) São Paulo
22	GK	Waldir Peres	2 February 1951 (aged 27)	5	(Brazil) São Paulo

=== Spain ===
Head coach: (Hungary) Ladislao Kubala

No.	Pos.	Player	Date of birth (age)	Caps	Club
1	GK	Luis Arconada	26 June 1954 (aged 23)	6	(Spain) Real Sociedad
2	DF	Antonio de la Cruz	7 May 1947 (aged 31)	5	(Spain) Barcelona
3	DF	Francisco Javier Uría	1 February 1950 (aged 28)	5	(Spain) Sporting Gijón
4	MF	Juan Manuel Asensi	23 September 1949 (aged 28)	25	(Spain) Barcelona
5	DF	Migueli	19 December 1951 (aged 26)	13	(Spain) Barcelona
6	DF	Antonio Biosca	8 December 1948 (aged 29)	1	(Spain) Real Betis
7	FW	Dani	28 June 1951 (aged 26)	7	(Spain) Athletic Bilbao
8	FW	Juanito	10 November 1954 (aged 23)	6	(Spain) Real Madrid
9	FW	Quini	23 September 1949 (aged 28)	22	(Spain) Sporting Gijón
10	FW	Santillana	23 August 1952 (aged 25)	9	(Spain) Real Madrid
11	MF	Julio Cardeñosa	27 October 1949 (aged 28)	3	(Spain) Real Betis
12	MF	Antonio Guzmán	2 December 1953 (aged 24)	1	(Spain) Rayo Vallecano
13	GK	Miguel Ángel	24 December 1947 (aged 30)	11	(Spain) Real Madrid
14	MF	Eugenio Leal	13 May 1953 (aged 25)	7	(Spain) Atlético Madrid
15	FW	Marañón	23 July 1948 (aged 29)	4	(Spain) Español
16	DF	Antonio Olmo	18 January 1954 (aged 24)	4	(Spain) Barcelona
17	DF	Marcelino	13 August 1955 (aged 22)	3	(Spain) Atlético Madrid
18	DF	Pirri (captain)	11 March 1945 (aged 33)	39	(Spain) Real Madrid
19	MF	Carles Rexach	13 January 1947 (aged 31)	14	(Spain) Barcelona
20	FW	Rubén Cano	5 February 1951 (aged 27)	6	(Spain) Atlético Madrid
21	DF	Isidoro San José	27 October 1955 (aged 22)	4	(Spain) Real Madrid
22	GK	Urruti	17 February 1952 (aged 26)	1	(Spain) Español

=== Sweden ===
Head coach: Georg Ericson

No.	Pos.	Player	Date of birth (age)	Caps	Club
1	GK	Ronnie Hellström	21 February 1949 (aged 29)	66	(West Germany) 1. FC Kaiserslautern
2	DF	Hasse Borg	4 August 1953 (aged 24)	14	(West Germany) Eintracht Braunschweig
3	DF	Roy Andersson	2 August 1949 (aged 28)	16	(Sweden) Malmö FF
4	DF	Björn Nordqvist (captain)	6 October 1942 (aged 35)	108	(Sweden) IFK Göteborg
5	DF	Ingemar Erlandsson	16 November 1957 (aged 20)	3	(Sweden) Malmö FF
6	MF	Staffan Tapper	10 July 1948 (aged 29)	34	(Sweden) Malmö FF
7	MF	Anders Linderoth	21 March 1950 (aged 28)	27	(France) Marseille
8	MF	Bo Larsson	5 May 1944 (aged 34)	67	(Sweden) Malmö FF
9	MF	Lennart Larsson	9 July 1953 (aged 24)	14	(West Germany) Schalke 04
10	FW	Thomas Sjöberg	6 July 1952 (aged 25)	29	(Sweden) Malmö FF
11	FW	Benny Wendt	4 November 1950 (aged 27)	14	(West Germany) 1. FC Kaiserslautern
12	GK	Göran Hagberg	8 November 1947 (aged 30)	13	(Sweden) Östers IF
13	DF	Magnus Andersson	23 April 1958 (aged 20)	4	(Sweden) Malmö FF
14	MF	Ronald Åhman	31 January 1957 (aged 21)	1	(Sweden) Örebro SK
15	FW	Torbjörn Nilsson	9 July 1954 (aged 23)	8	(Sweden) IFK Göteborg
16	FW	Conny Torstensson	28 August 1949 (aged 28)	37	(Switzerland) Zürich
17	GK	Jan Möller	17 September 1953 (aged 24)	0	(Sweden) Malmö FF
18	MF	Olle Nordin	23 November 1949 (aged 28)	11	(Sweden) IFK Göteborg
19	DF	Kent Karlsson	25 November 1945 (aged 32)	38	(Sweden) IFK Eskilstuna
20	DF	Roland Andersson	28 March 1950 (aged 28)	18	(Sweden) Malmö FF
21	FW	Sanny Åslund	29 August 1952 (aged 25)	3	(Sweden) AIK
22	FW	Ralf Edström	7 October 1952 (aged 25)	31	(Sweden) IFK Göteborg

== Group 4 ==
=== Iran ===
Head coach: Heshmat Mohajerani

No.	Pos.	Player	Date of birth (age)	Caps	Club
1	GK	Nasser Hejazi	14 December 1949 (aged 28)	47	(Iran) Shahbaz
2	MF	Iraj Danaeifard	11 March 1951 (aged 27)	7	(Iran) Taj
3	FW	Behtash Fariba	11 February 1955 (aged 23)	3	(Iran) Pas
4	MF	Majid Bishkar	6 August 1956 (aged 21)	0	(Iran) Shahbaz
5	DF	Javad Allahverdi	16 June 1952 (aged 25)	1	(Iran) Persepolis
6	DF	Hassan Nayebagha	17 September 1950 (aged 27)	18	(Iran) Homa FC
7	MF	Ali Parvin (captain)	12 October 1946 (aged 31)	7	(Iran) Persepolis
8	MF	Ebrahim Ghasempour	11 September 1957 (aged 20)	1	(Iran) Shahbaz
9	MF	Mohammad Sadeghi	16 March 1952 (aged 26)	3	(Iran) Persepolis
10	FW	Hassan Rowshan	2 June 1955 (aged 22)	4	(Iran) Taj
11	DF	Alireza Ghashghaean	27 February 1954 (aged 24)	?	(Iran) Bargh Shiraz
12	GK	Bahram Mavaddat	30 January 1950 (aged 28)	?	(Iran) Sepahan
13	FW	Hamid Majd Teymouri	3 June 1953 (aged 24)	?	(Iran) Shahbaz
14	DF	Hassan Nazari	19 August 1956 (aged 21)	4	(Iran) Taj
15	DF	Andranik Eskandarian	31 December 1951 (aged 26)	4	(Iran) Taj
16	FW	Nasser Nouraei	9 July 1956 (aged 21)	?	(Iran) Homa FC
17	FW	Ghafour Jahani	19 June 1951 (aged 26)	1	(Iran) Malavan
18	FW	Hossein Faraki	19 April 1956 (aged 22)	1	(Iran) Pas
19	MF	Ali Shojaei	23 March 1953 (aged 25)	?	(Iran) Zob Ahan
20	DF	Nasrollah Abdollahi	2 September 1951 (aged 26)	3	(Iran) Shahbaz
21	DF	Hossein Kazerani	13 April 1947 (aged 31)	1	(Iran) Pas
22	GK	Rasoul Korbekandi	27 January 1953 (aged 25)	?	(Iran) Zob Ahan

=== Netherlands ===
Head coach: (Austria) Ernst Happel

No.	Pos.	Player	Date of birth (age)	Caps	Club
1	GK	Piet Schrijvers	15 December 1946 (aged 31)	16	(Netherlands) Ajax
2	DF	Jan Poortvliet	21 September 1955 (aged 22)	1	(Netherlands) PSV
3	MF	Dick Schoenaker	30 November 1952 (aged 25)	0	(Netherlands) Ajax
4	DF	Adrie van Kraay	1 August 1953 (aged 24)	13	(Netherlands) PSV
5	DF	Ruud Krol (captain)	24 March 1949 (aged 29)	52	(Netherlands) Ajax
6	MF	Wim Jansen	28 October 1946 (aged 31)	50	(Netherlands) Feyenoord
7	DF	Piet Wildschut	25 October 1957 (aged 20)	1	(Netherlands) Twente
8	GK	Jan Jongbloed	25 November 1940 (aged 37)	19	(Netherlands) Roda JC
9	MF	Arie Haan	16 November 1948 (aged 29)	24	(Belgium) Anderlecht
10	FW	René van de Kerkhof	16 September 1951 (aged 26)	20	(Netherlands) PSV
11	MF	Willy van de Kerkhof	16 September 1951 (aged 26)	18	(Netherlands) PSV
12	FW	Rob Rensenbrink	3 July 1947 (aged 30)	34	(Belgium) Anderlecht
13	MF	Johan Neeskens	15 September 1951 (aged 26)	38	(Spain) Barcelona
14	MF	Johan Boskamp	21 October 1948 (aged 29)	1	(Belgium) Molenbeek
15	DF	Hugo Hovenkamp (Note: Hugo Hovenkamp withdrew due to injury. As the deadline for calling up replacement players had passed, the Netherlands went to the World Cup with 21 players only.)	5 October 1950 (aged 27)	7	(Netherlands) AZ
16	FW	Johnny Rep	25 November 1951 (aged 26)	23	(France) Bastia
17	DF	Wim Rijsbergen	18 January 1952 (aged 26)	25	(Netherlands) Feyenoord
18	FW	Dick Nanninga	17 January 1949 (aged 29)	1	(Netherlands) Roda JC
19	GK	Pim Doesburg	28 October 1943 (aged 34)	2	(Netherlands) Sparta Rotterdam
20	DF	Wim Suurbier	16 January 1945 (aged 33)	56	(West Germany) Schalke 04
21	FW	Harry Lubse	23 September 1951 (aged 26)	1	(Netherlands) PSV
22	DF	Ernie Brandts	3 February 1956 (aged 22)	1	(Netherlands) PSV

- Some of the players who had been in the Dutch squad at the 1974 FIFA World Cup, where the Netherlands used a purely alphabetical numbering system, were given the same numbers again in 1978. This applied to: Jan Jongbloed (number 8), René van de Kerkhof (number 10), Willy van de Kerkhof (number 11), Johan Neeskens (number 13), Johnny Rep (number 16), Wim Rijsbergen (number 17), and Wim Suurbier (number 20).
- Hugo Hovenkamp withdrew from the squad before the tournament began, but after the deadline for naming replacement players had passed. The Netherlands thus went to the World Cup with only 21 players.

=== Peru ===
Head coach: Marcos Calderón

No.	Pos.	Player	Date of birth (age)	Caps	Club
1	GK	Ottorino Sartor	18 September 1945 (aged 32)	12	(Peru) Colegio Nacional de Iquitos
2	DF	Jaime Duarte	27 February 1955 (aged 23)	0	(Peru) Alianza Lima
3	DF	Rodulfo Manzo	5 June 1949 (aged 28)	16	(Peru) Deportivo Municipal
4	DF	Héctor Chumpitaz (captain)	12 April 1944 (aged 34)	85	(Peru) Sporting Cristal
5	DF	Rubén Toribio Díaz	17 April 1952 (aged 26)	36	(Peru) Sporting Cristal
6	MF	José Velásquez	4 June 1952 (aged 25)	31	(Peru) Alianza Lima
7	FW	Juan José Muñante	12 June 1948 (aged 29)	42	(Mexico) UNAM Pumas
8	MF	César Cueto	16 June 1952 (aged 25)	1	(Peru) Alianza Lima
9	MF	Percy Rojas	16 September 1949 (aged 28)	11	(Peru) Sporting Cristal
10	MF	Teófilo Cubillas	8 March 1949 (aged 29)	70	(Peru) Alianza Lima
11	FW	Juan Carlos Oblitas	16 February 1951 (aged 27)	32	(Peru) Sporting Cristal
12	FW	Roberto Mosquera	21 June 1956 (aged 21)	1	(Peru) Sporting Cristal
13	GK	Juan Cáceres	27 December 1949 (aged 28)	1	(Peru) Alianza Lima
14	DF	José Navarro	24 September 1948 (aged 29)	5	(Peru) Sporting Cristal
15	MF	Germán Leguía	2 January 1954 (aged 24)	0	(Peru) Deportivo Municipal
16	MF	Raúl Gorriti	10 October 1956 (aged 21)	1	(Peru) Sporting Cristal
17	MF	Alfredo Quesada	22 September 1949 (aged 28)	48	(Peru) Sporting Cristal
18	MF	Ernesto Labarthe	2 June 1956 (aged 21)	0	(Peru) Sport Boys
19	FW	Guillermo La Rosa	6 June 1952 (aged 25)	1	(Peru) Alianza Lima
20	FW	Hugo Sotil	18 May 1949 (aged 29)	7	(Peru) Alianza Lima
21	GK	Ramón Quiroga	23 July 1950 (aged 27)	2	(Peru) Sporting Cristal
22	DF	Roberto Rojas	26 October 1955 (aged 22)	0	(Peru) Alianza Lima

=== Scotland ===
Manager: Ally MacLeod

No.	Pos.	Player	Date of birth (age)	Caps	Club
1	GK	Alan Rough	25 November 1951 (aged 26)	18	(Scotland) Partick Thistle
2	DF	Sandy Jardine	31 December 1948 (aged 29)	33	(Scotland) Rangers
3	DF	Willie Donachie	5 October 1951 (aged 26)	30	(England) Manchester City
4	DF	Martin Buchan	6 March 1949 (aged 29)	28	(England) Manchester United
5	DF	Gordon McQueen	26 June 1952 (aged 25)	20	(England) Manchester United
6	MF	Bruce Rioch (captain)	6 September 1947 (aged 30)	22	(England) Derby County
7	MF	Don Masson	26 August 1946 (aged 31)	16	(England) Derby County
8	FW	Kenny Dalglish	4 March 1951 (aged 27)	54	(England) Liverpool
9	FW	Joe Jordan	15 December 1951 (aged 26)	30	(England) Manchester United
10	MF	Asa Hartford	24 October 1950 (aged 27)	24	(England) Manchester City
11	MF	Willie Johnston (Note: Willie Johnston was sent home for failing a drug test after the first match against Peru.)	19 December 1946 (aged 31)	21	(England) West Bromwich Albion
12	GK	Jim Blyth	2 February 1955 (aged 23)	2	(England) Coventry City
13	DF	Stuart Kennedy	31 May 1953 (aged 25)	3	(Scotland) Aberdeen
14	DF	Tom Forsyth	23 January 1949 (aged 29)	19	(Scotland) Rangers
15	MF	Archie Gemmill	24 March 1947 (aged 31)	26	(England) Nottingham Forest
16	FW	Lou Macari	7 June 1949 (aged 28)	22	(England) Manchester United
17	FW	Derek Johnstone	4 November 1953 (aged 24)	13	(Scotland) Rangers
18	MF	Graeme Souness	6 May 1953 (aged 25)	6	(England) Liverpool
19	FW	John Robertson	20 January 1953 (aged 25)	2	(England) Nottingham Forest
20	GK	Bobby Clark	26 September 1945 (aged 32)	17	(Scotland) Aberdeen
21	FW	Joe Harper	11 January 1948 (aged 30)	3	(Scotland) Aberdeen
22	DF	Kenny Burns	23 September 1953 (aged 24)	11	(England) Nottingham Forest

== Notes ==
Each national team had to submit a squad of 22 players. All the teams included 3 goalkeepers, except Mexico who only called two.

== Coaches representation by country ==
Nº	Country	Coaches
2	Austria	Ernst Happel (Netherlands), Helmut Senekowitsch
2	Hungary	Lajos Baróti, Ladislao Kubala (Spain)
1	Argentina	César Luis Menotti
1	Brazil	Cláudio Coutinho
1	France	Michel Hidalgo
1	Iran	Heshmat Mohajerani
1	Italy	Enzo Bearzot
1	Mexico	José Antonio Roca
1	Peru	Marcos Calderón
1	Poland	Jacek Gmoch
1	Scotland	Ally MacLeod
1	Sweden	Georg Ericson
1	Tunisia	Abdelmajid Chetali
1	West Germany	Helmut Schön
