= 1978 FIFA World Cup qualification (UEFA–CONMEBOL play-off) =

- Event: 1978 FIFA World Cup qualification
Hungary	Bolivia
(Hungary)	(Bolivia)
9	2
- Hungary won 9–2 on aggregate and qualified for the 1978 FIFA World Cup

First leg
Hungary	Bolivia
6	0
- Date: 29 October 1977
- Venue: Népstadion, Budapest
- Referee: Ramón Barreto (Uruguay)
- Attendance: 60,000

Second leg
Bolivia	Hungary
2	3
- Date: 30 November 1977
- Venue: Estadio Hernando Siles, La Paz
- Referee: Charles Corver (Netherlands)
- Attendance: 26,983

The 1978 FIFA World Cup UEFA–CONMEBOL qualification play-off was a two-legged home-and-away tie between the winners of UEFA Group 9, Hungary, and the last-placed team of the CONMEBOL final round, Bolivia. The matches were played on 29 October and 30 November 1977 in Budapest and La Paz, respectively.

After beating Bolivia in both matches (6–0 and 3–2), Hungary won 4–0 on points (9–2 on aggregate) and therefore qualified for the 1978 World Cup in Argentina. It was Bolivia's closest attempt to qualify for the World Cup, until the country secured a place sixteen years later.

== Qualified teams ==
Team	Confed.	Qualification
Hungary	UEFA	1st. of Group 9
Bolivia	CONMEBOL	Last of Final round

== Venues ==
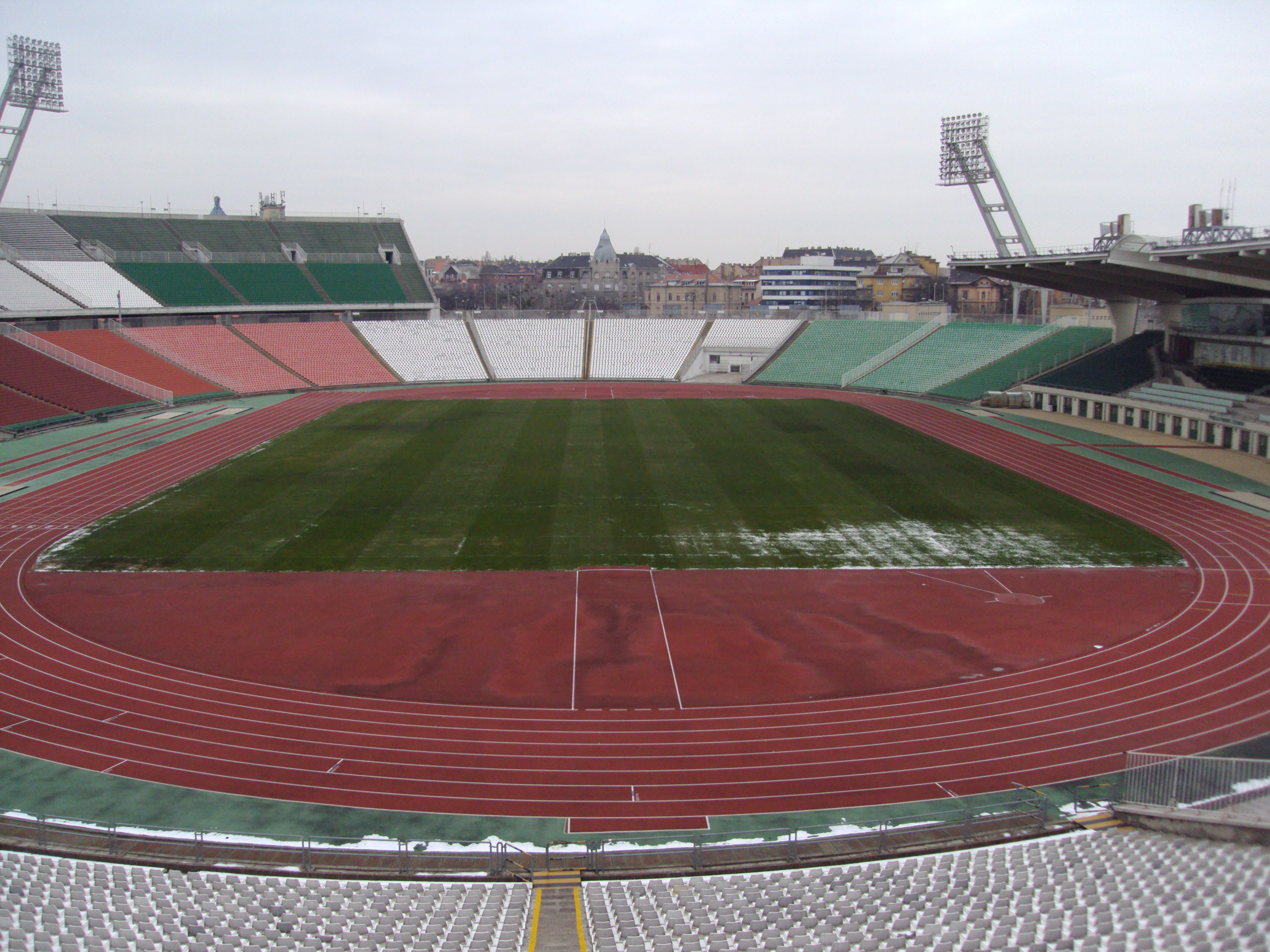
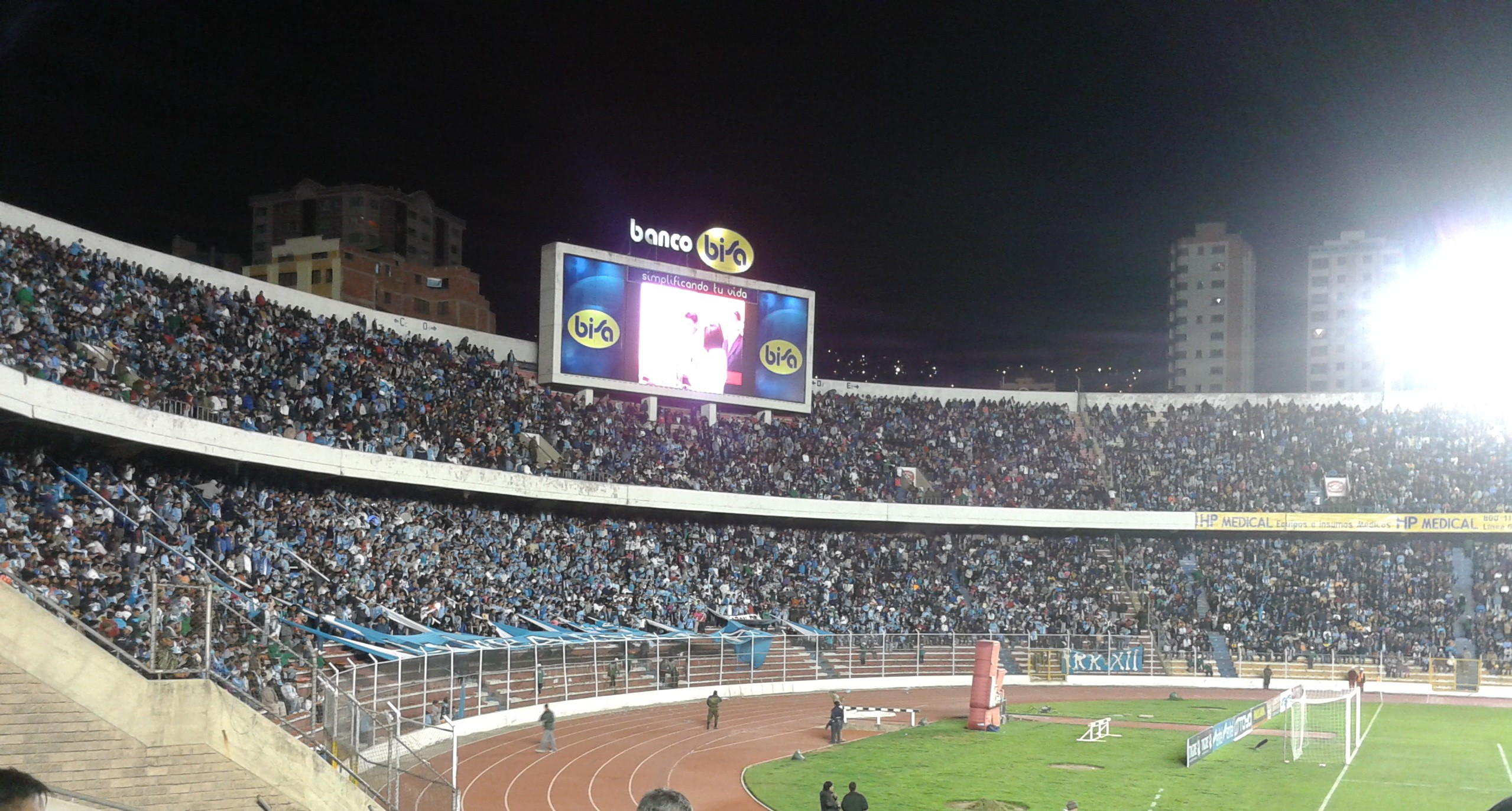
Népstadion (left) and Estadio Hernando Siles, venues for the series

== Match details ==
=== First leg ===
1978 FIFA World Cup qualification play-off
29 October 1977
First leg

Hungary	6–0	Bolivia
Nyilasi 12'; Törőcsik 19'; Zombori 22'; Várady 27'; Pintér 39'; Nagy 81'

Népstadion, Budapest
Attendance: 60,000
Referee: Ramón Barreto (Uruguay)

Hungary
Bolivia

GK	Sándor Gujdár
DF	József Tóth
DF	Peter Török
DF	Zoltán Kereki
DF	István Kocsis
MF	Sándor Zombori
MF	Sándor Pintér
MF	László Fazekas	(substituted off) 67'
FW	Tibor Nyilasi	(substituted off) 78'
FW	Béla Várady
FW	András Törőcsik
Substitutes:
FW	László Pusztai	(substituted on) 67'
MF	László Nagy	(substituted on) 78'
Manager:
(Hungary) Lajos Baróti

GK	Arturo Galarza
DF	Víctor Villalón
DF	Eduardo Angulo
DF	René Tarritolay
MF	Carlos Aragonés
MF	Ovidio Mezza	(substituted off) 80'
MF	Miguel Aguilar
MF	Pablo Baldivieso
MF	Erwin Romero
MF	Windsor del Llano
FW	Luis Bastida	(substituted off) 46'
Substitutes:
FW	Juan Carlos Sánchez	(substituted on) 46'
MF	Freddy Vargas	(substituted on) 80'
Manager:
(Germany) Edward Virba

=== Second leg ===
30 November 1977
Second leg

Bolivia	2–3	Hungary
Aragonés 45+2' (pen.), 90+4'	Report	Törőcsik 37'; Halász 43'; Del Llano 84' (o.g.)

Estadio Hernando Siles, La Paz
Attendance: 46,583
Referee: Charles Corver (Netherlands)
