= 1978 FIFA World Cup Group 1 =

Football tournament group stage

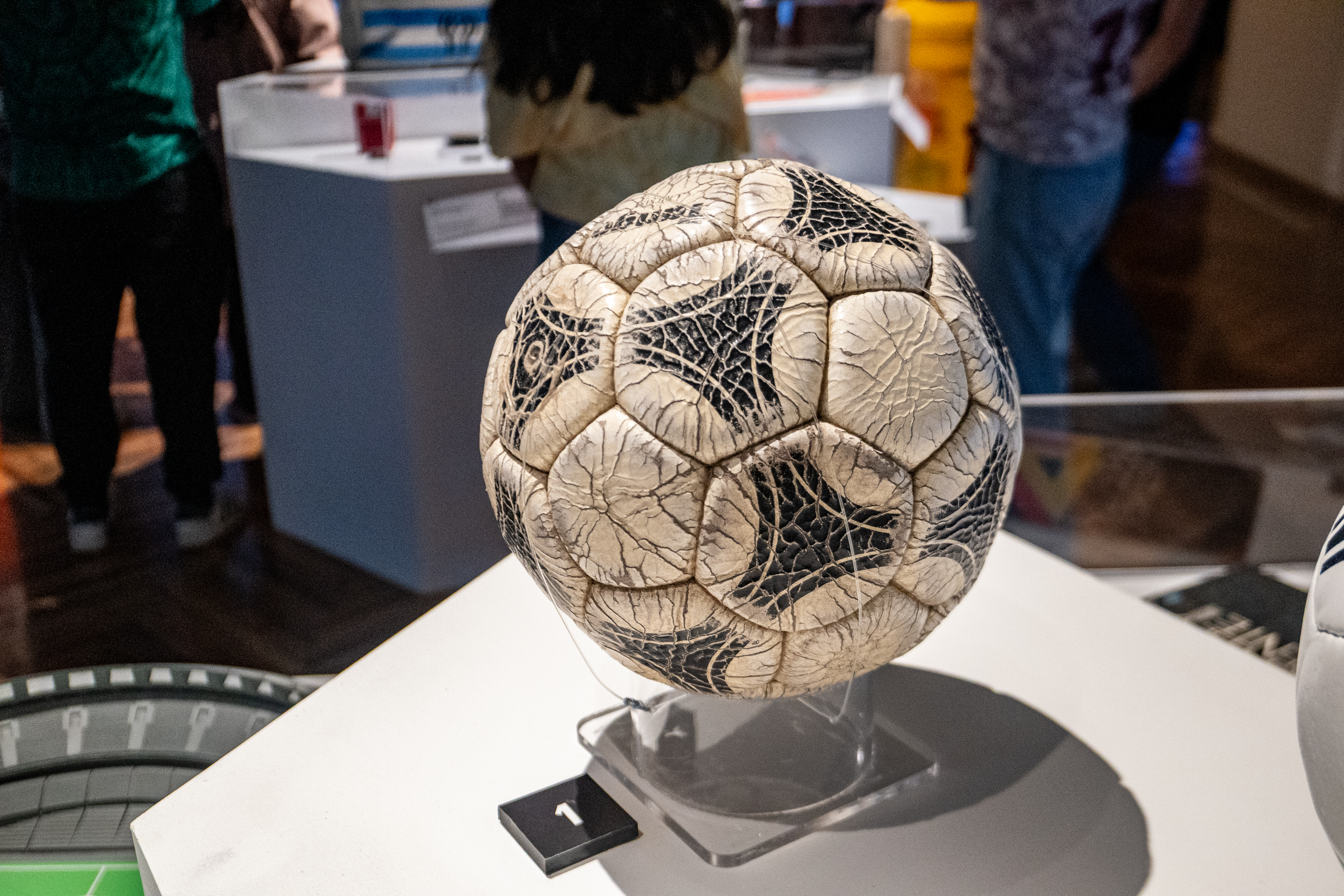
The ball used in the opening match between Italy and France. Bernard Lacombe scored the tournament's first goal with it.

Group 1 of the 1978 FIFA World Cup was one of four groups of nations competing at the 1978 FIFA World Cup. The group's first round of matches began on 2 June and its last matches were played on 10 June. All six group matches were played either at Estadio José María Minella in Mar del Plata, or Estadio Monumental in Buenos Aires. The group consisted of Argentina (the host of the tournament) as well as Italy, France and Hungary.

== Standings ==
Pos	Team	Pld	W	D	L	GF	GA	GD	Pts	Qualification
1	Italy	3	3	0	0	6	2	+4	6	Advance to second round
2	Argentina	3	2	0	1	4	3	+1	4	Advance to second round
3	France	3	1	0	2	5	5	0	2	
4	Hungary	3	0	0	3	3	8	−5	0	

Source: FIFA

== Matches ==
=== Italy vs France ===
The first game in Group 1 pitted Italy against France. Italy were favored to win but had been victims of plenty of dull and unexciting performances leading up, while a rejuvenated French team were making their first appearance since the 1966 world cup. The first goal came with under a minute as goalkeeper Bertrand-Demanes passed the ball to Didier Six who ran down the entire length of the pitch before delivering a good cross that Bernard Lacombe headed past Dino Zoff to score the first goal of the tournament. Italy controlled the rest of the match and equalized halfway through the first half when after the ball pinged around the area it glanced off the unsuspecting Paolo Rossi and into the goal. It would be the first of 9 goals Rossi would score at the finals. Shortly after the beginning of the second-half substitute Renato Zaccarelli's shot went in. The Italians saw out the rest of the match, which saw little chances except for Maxime Bossis's shot that flew just wide of Zoff's post. Despite it being an unremarkable match it featured the emergence of two teams that would dazzle the world four years later at the 1982 FIFA World Cup.

2 June 1978
13:45 ART

Italy	2–1	France
Rossi 29'; Zaccarelli 54'		Lacombe 1'

Estadio José María Minella, Mar del Plata
Attendance: 42,373
Referee: Nicolae Rainea (Romania)

Italy	France

GK	1	Dino Zoff (c)
SW	8	Gaetano Scirea
RB	5	Claudio Gentile
CB	2	Mauro Bellugi
LB	3	Antonio Cabrini
MF	10	Romeo Benetti
MF	14	Marco Tardelli	(yellow card) 58'
MF	9	Giancarlo Antognoni		(substituted off) 46'
RW	16	Franco Causio
CF	21	Paolo Rossi
CF	18	Roberto Bettega
Substitutions:
MF	15	Renato Zaccarelli		(substituted on) 46'
Manager:
Enzo Bearzot

GK	21	Jean-Paul Bertrand-Demanes
SW	8	Marius Tresor (c)
RB	4	Gerard Janvion
CB	7	Patrice Rio
LB	3	Maxime Bossis
CM	11	Henri Michel	(yellow card) 81'
CM	10	Jean-Marc Guillou
AM	15	Michel Platini	(yellow card) 60'
RW	16	Christian Dalger
LW	19	Didier Six		(substituted off) 76'
CF	17	Bernard Lacombe		(substituted off) 74'
Substitutions:
CF	14	Marc Berdoll		(substituted on) 74'
LW	20	Olivier Rouyer		(substituted on) 76'
Manager:
Michel Hidalgo

=== Argentina vs Hungary ===
2 June 1978
19:15 ART

Argentina	2–1	Hungary
Luque 14'; Bertoni 83'		Csapó 9'

Estadio Monumental, Buenos Aires
Attendance: 71,615
Referee: Antonio Garrido (Portugal)

Argentina	Hungary

GK	5	Ubaldo Fillol
RB	15	Jorge Olguín
CB	7	Luis Galván
CB	19	Daniel Passarella (c)	(yellow card) 77'
LB	20	Alberto Tarantini
DM	6	Américo Gallego
CM	2	Osvaldo Ardiles
CM	21	José Daniel Valencia		(substituted off) 75'
RW	9	René Houseman		(substituted off) 67'
LW	10	Mario Kempes
CF	14	Leopoldo Luque
Substitutions:
RW	4	Daniel Bertoni		(substituted on) 67'
CM	1	Norberto Alonso		(substituted on) 75'
Manager:
César Luis Menotti

GK	1	Sándor Gujdár
SW	3	István Kocsis
RB	2	Péter Török		(substituted off) 46'
CB	6	Zoltán Kereki (c)
LB	4	József Tóth
CM	13	Károly Csapó
CM	10	Sándor Pintér
CM	5	Sándor Zombori
AM	8	Tibor Nyilasi	(yellow card) 21'	(red card) 89'
CF	9	András Törőcsik	(yellow card) 48'	(red card) 88'
CF	18	László Nagy
Substitutions:
RB	12	Győző Martos		(substituted on) 46'
Manager:
Lajos Baróti

=== Italy vs Hungary ===
Italy once again had an uncertain start against Hungary in their second group game and appeared nervy early on, and Hungary had several good chances to score. But just after the half-hour mark Paolo Rossi made it two goals in two games by firing home after a shot had deflected into his path. Just a minute later Roberto Bettega took advantage of some poor defending to make it two goals in two minutes. Midway through the second half Romeo Benetti fired in a superb shot and Italy had the victory all but secure. It could have been so much more as the Italians hit the crossbar a total of three times in the game. Late on Hungary won a penalty kick, which was dispatched by substitute András Tóth but it was just consolation as Hungary were eliminated and Italy confirmed their spot in the second round.

6 June 1978
13:45 ART

Italy	3–1	Hungary
Rossi 34'; Bettega 35'; Benetti 61'		A. Tóth 81' (pen.)

Estadio José María Minella, Mar del Plata
Attendance: 26,533
Referee: Ramón Barreto (Uruguay)

Italy	Hungary

GK	1	Dino Zoff (c)
SW	8	Gaetano Scirea
RB	5	Claudio Gentile
CB	2	Mauro Bellugi
LB	3	Antonio Cabrini	(substituted off) 79'
MF	10	Romeo Benetti
MF	14	Marco Tardelli
MF	9	Giancarlo Antognoni
RW	16	Franco Causio
CF	21	Paolo Rossi
CF	18	Roberto Bettega	(substituted off) 84'
Substitutions:
DF	4	Antonello Cuccureddu	(substituted on) 79'
CF	19	Francesco Graziani	(substituted on) 84'
Manager:
Enzo Bearzot

GK	21	Ferenc Mészáros
SW	3	István Kocsis
RB	12	Győző Martos	(yellow card) 64'
CB	6	Zoltán Kereki (c)
LB	4	József Tóth
CM	13	Károly Csapó
CM	10	Sándor Pintér
CM	5	Sándor Zombori	(yellow card) 26'
RW	17	László Pusztai
LW	18	László Nagy		(substituted off) 46'
CF	7	László Fazekas		(substituted off) 46'
Substitutions:
MF	16	István Halász		(substituted on) 46'
FW	19	András Tóth		(substituted on) 46'
Manager:
Lajos Baróti

=== Argentina vs France ===
6 June 1978
19:15 ART

Argentina	2–1	France
Passarella 45' (pen.); Luque 73'		Platini 60'

Estadio Monumental, Buenos Aires
Attendance: 71,666
Referee: Jean Dubach (Switzerland)

Argentina	France

GK	5	Ubaldo Fillol
RB	15	Jorge Olguín
CB	7	Luis Galván
CB	19	Daniel Passarella (c)
LB	20	Alberto Tarantini
DM	6	Américo Gallego
CM	2	Osvaldo Ardiles
AM	10	Mario Kempes
CF	14	Leopoldo Luque
WF	9	René Houseman
WF	21	José Daniel Valencia	(substituted off) 64'
Substitutions:
AM	1	Norberto Alonso	(substituted on) 64'	(substituted off) 71'
WF	16	Oscar Ortiz		(substituted on) 71'
Manager:
César Luis Menotti

GK	21	Jean-Paul Bertrand-Demanes		(substituted off) 55'
SW	8	Marius Tresor (c)
RB	2	Patrick Battiston
CB	6	Christian Lopez
LB	3	Maxime Bossis
CM	11	Henri Michel
CM	9	Dominique Bathenay
AM	15	Michel Platini
RW	18	Dominique Rocheteau
LW	19	Didier Six	(yellow card) 88'
CF	17	Bernard Lacombe
Substitutions:
GK	1	Dominique Baratelli		(substituted on) 55'
Manager:
Michel Hidalgo

=== France vs Hungary ===
Both teams arrived for the match with white shirts and France was forced to borrow green-striped shirts from local club Kimberley de Mar del Plata. (Note: Kimberley shirts for the outfield players were only numbered from 2 to 11 and 13 to 16. Therefore, some players wore numbers not corresponding to the FIFA official ones: Dominique Rocheteau wore 7 instead of 18, Olivier Rouyer wore 11 instead of 20, Claude Papi wore 10 instead of 12 and substitute Didier Six wore 16 instead of 19. For these players, the right FIFA numbers were shown on the shorts.)

10 June 1978
14:30 ART (Note: Initially scheduled at 13:45, the match was delayed as both teams were wearing white shirts.)

France	3–1	Hungary
Lopez 23'; Berdoll 38'; Rocheteau 42'		Zombori 41'

Estadio José María Minella, Mar del Plata
Attendance: 23,127
Referee: Arnaldo Cézar Coelho (Brazil)

France	Hungary

GK	22	Dominique Dropsy
SW	8	Marius Tresor (c)
RB	4	Gerard Janvion
CB	6	Christian Lopez
LB	5	François Bracci
CM	13	Jean Petit
CM	9	Dominique Bathenay
AM	12	Claude Papi	(substituted off) 46'
RW	18	Dominique Rocheteau	(substituted off) 75'
LW	20	Olivier Rouyer
CF	14	Marc Berdoll
Substitutions:
AM	15	Michel Platini	(substituted on) 46'
LW	19	Didier Six	(substituted on) 75'
Manager:
Michel Hidalgo

GK	1	Sándor Gujdár
SW	14	László Bálint
RB	12	Győző Martos
CB	6	Zoltán Kereki (c)
LB	4	József Tóth
CM	8	Tibor Nyilasi
CM	10	Sándor Pintér
CM	5	Sándor Zombori
RW	17	László Pusztai
LW	18	László Nagy	(substituted off) 46'
CF	9	András Törőcsik
Substitutions:
MF	13	Károly Csapó	(substituted on) 46'
Manager:
Lajos Baróti

=== Argentina vs Italy ===
10 June 1978
19:15 ART

Argentina	0–1	Italy
		Bettega 67'

Estadio Monumental, Buenos Aires
Attendance: 71,712
Referee: Abraham Klein (Israel)

Argentina	Italy

GK	5	Ubaldo Fillol
RB	15	Jorge Olguín
CB	7	Luis Galván
CB	19	Daniel Passarella (c)
LB	20	Alberto Tarantini
DM	6	Américo Gallego
CM	2	Osvaldo Ardiles
CM	21	José Daniel Valencia
RW	4	Daniel Bertoni
LW	16	Oscar Ortiz	(substituted off) 72'
CF	10	Mario Kempes
Substitutions:
RW	9	René Houseman	(substituted on) 72'
Manager:
César Luis Menotti

GK	1	Dino Zoff (c)
SW	8	Gaetano Scirea
RB	5	Claudio Gentile
CB	2	Mauro Bellugi		(substituted off) 6'
LB	3	Antonio Cabrini
CM	10	Romeo Benetti	(yellow card) 60'
CM	14	Marco Tardelli
CM	9	Giancarlo Antognoni		(substituted off) 73'
RW	16	Franco Causio
CF	21	Paolo Rossi
CF	18	Roberto Bettega
Substitutions:
DF	4	Antonello Cuccureddu		(substituted on) 6'
CM	15	Renato Zaccarelli		(substituted on) 73'
Manager:
Enzo Bearzot

== See also ==
- Argentina at the FIFA World Cup
- France at the FIFA World Cup
- Hungary at the FIFA World Cup
- Italy at the FIFA World Cup
