= List of Hungary international footballers =

The Hungary national football team has represented Hungary in international association football since 1902. Hungary played its first international match on 12 October 1902, losing to neighbouring Austria 5–0 in a friendly. The team is governed by the Hungarian Football Federation (Hungarian: Magyar Labdarúgó-szövetség; MLSZ) and competes as a member of the Union of European Football Associations (UEFA), which encompasses the countries of Europe and Israel. As of November 2022, Hungary has played a total of 976 international matches. Hungary have played Austria most frequently, meeting the side 137 times. Of these, Hungary have won 67, drawn 30 and lost 40. The Austria–Hungary football rivalry is the second-most played international fixture in football history, behind only the Argentina–Uruguay rivalry which has been played officially 194 times.

Balázs Dzsudzsák is Hungary's most capped player with 109 caps.

== Players ==
Appearances and goals are composed of FIFA World Cup and UEFA European Championships, and each competition's required qualification matches, as well as UEFA Nations League matches and numerous international friendly tournaments and matches. Players are listed by number of caps. If the number of caps is equal, the players are then listed alphabetically. Statistics updated following match played on 8 June 2024.

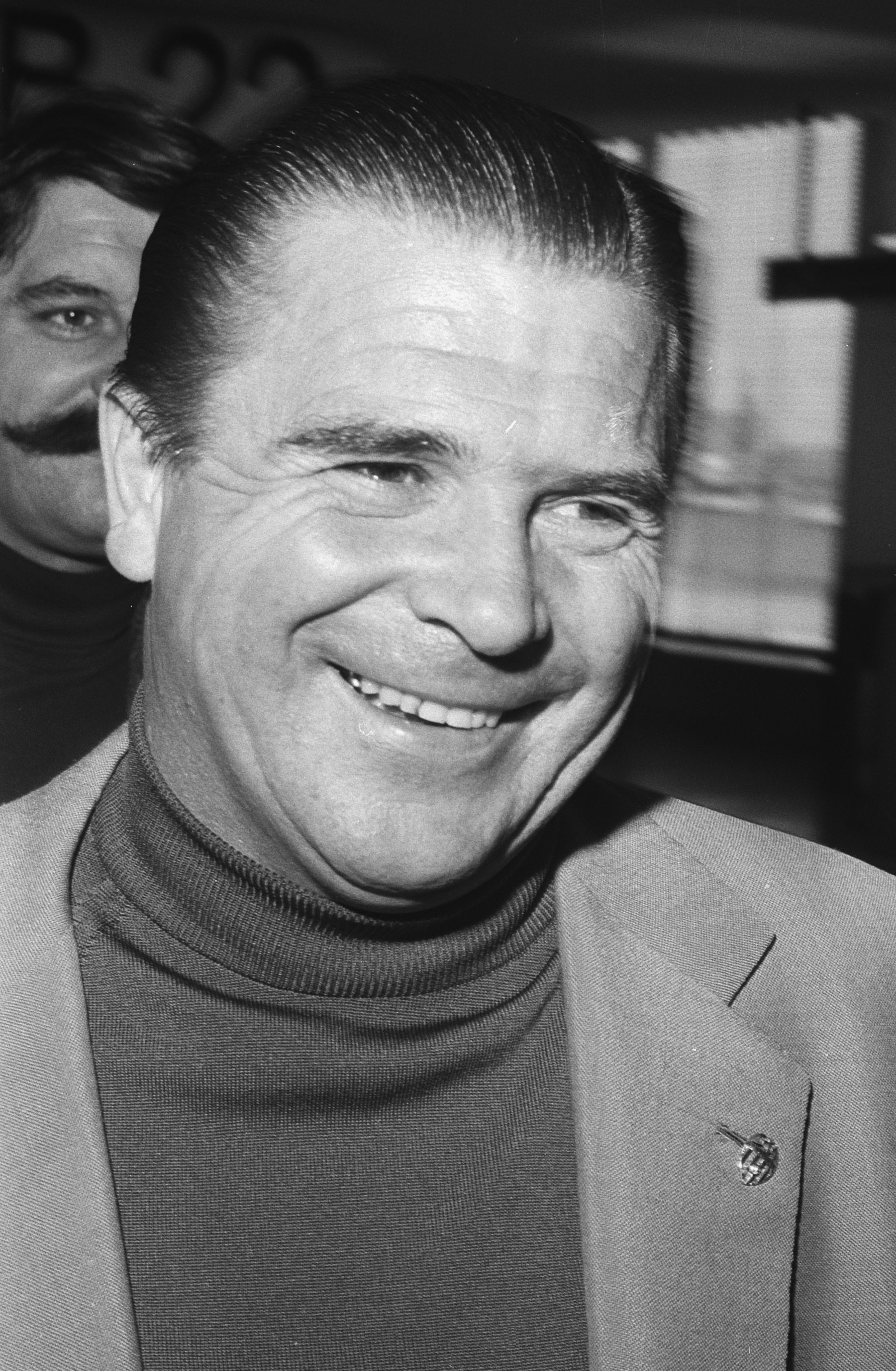
Ferenc Puskás is the nation's leading goalscorer.

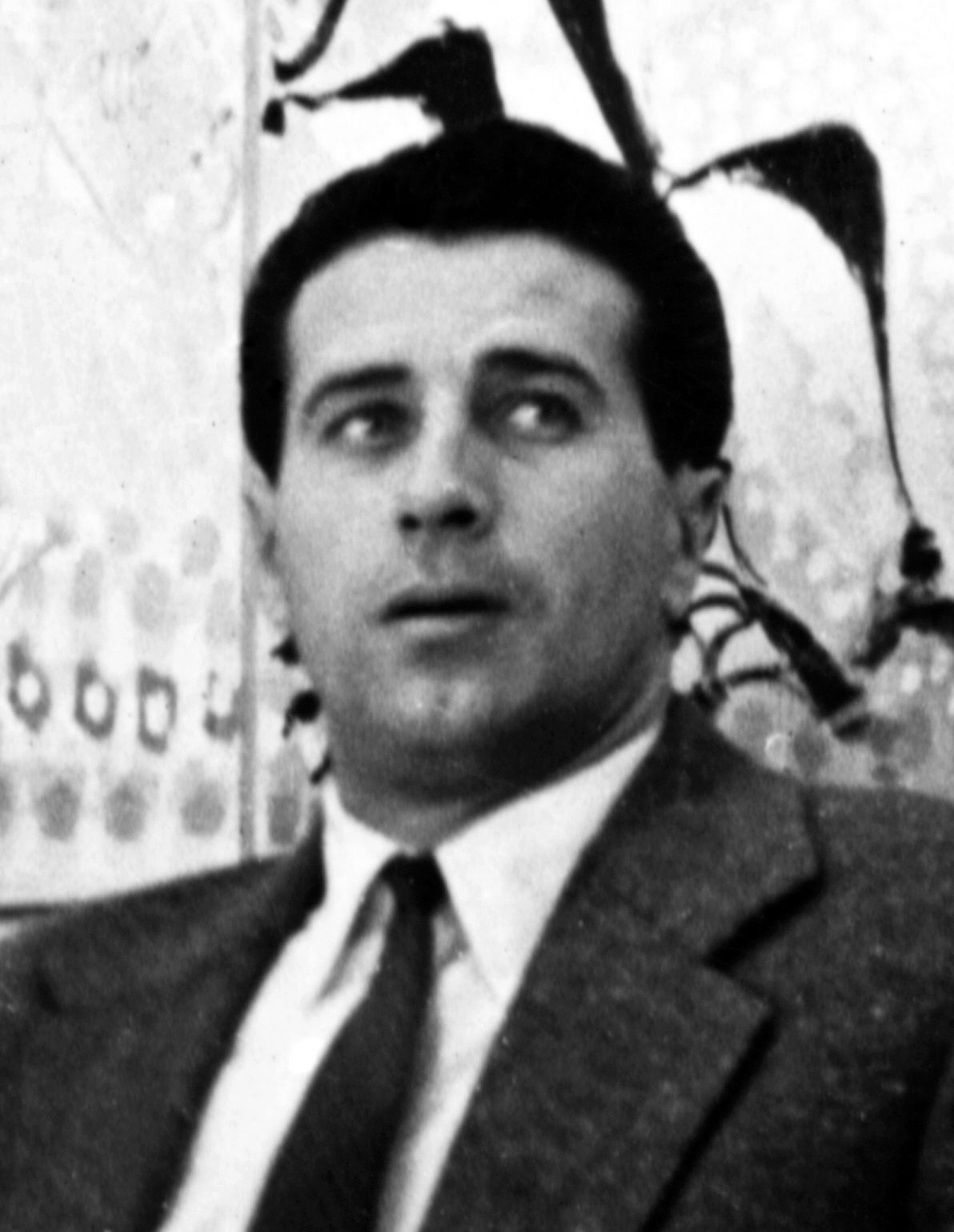
József Bozsik was Hungary's record appearance holder between 1957 and 2016.

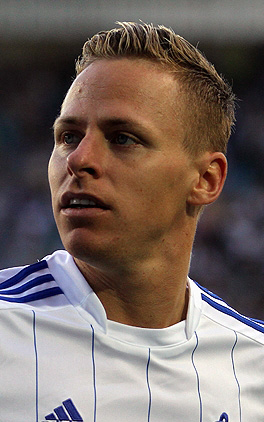
Balázs Dzsudzsák is the most capped player

	Key
*	Still active for the national team (Note: Players who are still active for the national team are players who have not retired from international football and are, subsequently, eligible to be called up.)
=	Player is tied for the number of caps
GK	Goalkeeper
DF	Defender
MF	Midfielder
FW	Forward

Hungary national team footballers with at least 25 appearances
No.	Name	Position	National career	Caps	Goals	Notes
1	Balázs Dzsudzsák	FW	2007–2022	109	21	
2	Gábor Király	GK	1998–2016	108	0	
3	József Bozsik	MF	1947–1962	101	11	
4	Zoltán Gera	MF	2002–2017	97	26	
5	Roland Juhász	DF	2004–2016	95	6	
6	László Fazekas	FW	1968–1983	92	24	
7=	Gyula Grosics	GK	1947–1962	86	0	
7=	Ádám Szalai	FW	2009–2022	86	26	
9	Ferenc Puskás	FW	1945–1956	85	84	
10	Imre Garaba	DF	1980–1991	82	3	
11=	Sándor Mátrai	DF	1956–1967	81	0	
11=	Ádám Nagy*	MF	2015–	81	2	
13	Vilmos Vanczák	DF	2004–2015	79	4	
14	Ferenc Sipos	DF	1957–1966	77	1	
15=	László Bálint	DF	1972–1982	76	3	
15=	Ferenc Bene	FW	1962–1979	76	36	
15=	Máté Fenyvesi	FW	1954–1966	76	8	
18=	Flórián Albert	FW	1959–1974	75	31	
18=	Károly Sándor	FW	1949–1964	75	27	
20	Lajos Tichy	FW	1955–1971	72	51	
21=	József Kiprich	FW	1984–1995	70	28	
21=	Tibor Nyilasi	MF	1975–1985	70	32	
23=	Nándor Hidegkuti	FW	1945–1958	69	39	
23=	Ádám Lang*	DF	2014–	69	2	
25=	Sándor Kocsis	FW	1948–1956	68	75	
25=	Imre Schlosser	FW	1906–1927	68	59	
27	Béla Illés	FW	1991–2001	64	15	
28	Tamás Priskin	FW	2005–2017	63	17	
29=	János Göröcs	FW	1958–1970	62	19	
29=	György Sárosi	MF	1931–1943	62	42	
31=	Pál Dárdai	MF	1998–2010	61	5	
31=	Lajos Détári	MF	1984–1994	61	13	
31=	Kálmán Mészöly	DF	1961–1971	61	6	
34	Tamás Hajnal	MF	2004–2013	59	7	
35	Péter Lipcsei	MF	1991–2005	58	1	
36=	Attila Fiola*	DF	2014–	57	2	
36=	Gábor Halmai	MF	1993–2001	57	4	
36=	Tamás Kádár*	DF	2010–	57	1	
39=	Kálmán Kovács	FW	1982–1995	56	19	
39=	József Tóth	DF	1974–1983	56	0	
41	Sándor Sallai	DF	1982–1989	55	1	
42=	Sándor Bíró	DF	1932–1946	54	0	
42=	Péter Gulácsi*	GK	2014–	54	0	
44	Mihály Lantos	DF	1950–1956	53	5	
45	Vilmos Sebők	DF	1996–2006	52	9	
46=	Károly Fogl	DF	1918–1929	51	2	
46=	Szabolcs Huszti	MF	2004–2010	51	7	
46=	László Kleinheisler*	MF	2015–	51	3	
49	György Bognár	MF	1985–1994	50	7	
50=	Jenő Buzánszky	DF	1950–1956	49	0	
50=	Gyula Lázár	MF	1931–1941	49	1	
50=	Krisztián Lisztes	MF	1994–2004	49	9	
50=	Roland Sallai*	FW	2016–	49	13	
54=	Ákos Elek	MF	2010–2018	48	1	
54=	Pál Titkos	FW	1929–1938	48	13	
54=	József Turay	FW	1928–1939	48	11	
57	Vilmos Kertész	MF	1909–1923	47	11	
58=	László Bodnár	DF	2000–2010	46	0	
58=	László Sárosi	DF	1957–1965	46	0	
58=	Géza Toldi	FW	1929–1940	46	25	
61=	Willi Orbán*	DF	2018–	45	6	
61=	András Törőcsik	FW	1977–1984	45	12	
63=	Gergő Lovrencsics	DF	2013–2021	44	1	
63=	Attila Szalai*	DF	2019–	44	1	
63=	István Vincze	FW	1986–1996	44	8	
66=	Zoltán Czibor	FW	1949–1956	43	17	
66=	Nemanja Nikolić*	FW	2013–2023	43	8	
68=	Antal Szabó	GK	1932–1939	42	0	
68=	Dominik Szoboszlai*	MF	2019–	42	12	
68=	Sándor Torghelle	FW	2004–2010	42	11	
68=	Krisztián Vadócz*	MF	2006–	42	2	
72=	Gáspár Borbás	FW	1903–1916	41	11	
72=	Csaba Fehér	DF	1998–2009	41	0	
72=	Gyula Rákosi	FW	1960–1968	41	4	
75=	Lajos Korányi	DF	1929–1937	40	0	
75=	István Kozma	MF	1986–1995	40	1	
75=	Flórián Urbán	DF	1991–2003	40	4	
78=	László Budai	FW	1949–1959	39	10	
78=	Sándor Pintér	MF	1975–1978	39	2	
78=	Gyula Zsengellér	FW	1936–1947	39	32	
81=	Zoltán Blum	MF	1912–1925	38	1	
81=	József Fogl	DF	1920–1930	38	0	
81=	Zsolt Petry	GK	1988–1996	38	0	
81=	Ernő Solymosi	MF	1960–1968	38	7	
85=	Tibor Balog	MF	1988–1997	37	2	
85=	Péter Disztl	GK	1984–1989	37	0	
85=	Gyula Hajszán	FW	1982–1994	37	4	
85=	Zoltán Kereki	DF	1976–1980	37	7	
85=	Antal Kotász	MF	1954–1961	37	0	
85=	Gyula Lóránt	DF	1948–1955	37	0	
85=	Emil Lőrincz	DF	1990–1997	37	3	
85=	Krisztián Németh*	FW	2010–	37	4	
85=	Miklós Páncsics	DF	1969–1973	37	0	
85=	Lajos Szűcs	DF	1967–1973	37	2	
95=	Gyula Bíró	MF	1906–1916	36	3	
95=	Dénes Dibusz*	GK	2014–	36	0	
95=	Zsolt Kalmár*	MF	2014–	36	3	
95=	Vladimir Koman*	FW	2010–	36	7	
95=	Loïc Négo*	DF	2020–	36	2	
95=	Imre Szabics	FW	2003–2013	36	13	
95=	Béla Várady	FW	1972–1982	36	13	
102=	Tibor Dombi	MF	1994–2001	35	1	
102=	Péter Halmosi	MF	2002–2013	35	0	
102=	Péter Török	DF	1973–1980	35	0	
102=	József Zakariás	MF	1947–1954	35	0	
106=	László Cseh	FW	1932–1937	34	15	
106=	Győző Martos	DF	1977–1983	34	0	
106=	János Mátyus	DF	1998–2002	34	3	
106=	Balázs Tóth	MF	2004–2010	34	0	
106=	József Varga*	MF	2009–	34	0	
111=	János Farkas	FW	1964–1969	33	19	
111=	Ferenc Hirzer	FW	1922–1930	33	14	
111=	József Kardos	MF	1980–1987	33	3	
111=	László Kiss	FW	1980–1983	33	11	
111=	Lajos Kocsis	MF	1969–1975	33	7	
111=	György Korsós	DF	1998–2005	33	1	
111=	Gyula Rumbold	DF	1907–1914	33	0	
111=	Sándor Zámbó	MF	1969–1975	33	3	
119=	Ferenc Horváth	FW	1996–2001	32	11	
119=	Gyula Mándi	DF	1921–1934	32	0	
119=	Antal Nagy	DF	1979–1988	32	5	
119=	György Orth	MF	1919–1927	32	13	
119=	József Takács	FW	1923–1933	32	26	
124=	Antal Dunai	FW	1969–1973	31	9	
124=	István Pisont	FW	1991–1999	31	10	
124=	Antal Szentmihályi	GK	1961–1969	31	0	
124=	Dániel Tőzsér	MF	2005–2015	31	1	
124=	József Varga	DF	1980–1986	31	1	
129	Károly Zsák	GK	1912–1925	30	0	
130=	Márton Esterházy	FW	1980–1988	29	11	
130=	József Keller	DF	1986–1994	29	0	
130=	Krisztián Kenesei	FW	2000–2005	29	9	
130=	Ferenc Machos	FW	1955–1963	29	14	
130=	Ferenc Mészáros	GK	1973–1988	29	0	
130=	Antal Róth	DF	1983–1989	29	1	
136=	József Braun	FW	1918–1926	28	11	
136=	László Disztl	DF	1984–1993	28	1	
136=	Attila Dragóner	DF	1996–2005	28	0	
136=	Zoltán Péter	DF	1979–1987	28	4	
136=	Gergely Rudolf	FW	2008–2014	28	10	
136=	Zoltán Szélesi	DF	2004–2015	28	0	
136=	Ferenc Szojka	MF	1954–1960	28	1	
143=	Gábor Babos	GK	1997–2009	27	0	
143=	Béla Bodonyi	FW	1979–1985	27	6	
143=	Péter Hannich	MF	1982–1987	27	2	
143=	Kálmán Ihász	DF	1962–1969	27	0	
143=	László Klausz	FW	1993–2000	27	6	
143=	György Molnár	FW	1920–1927	27	11	
149=	Endre Botka*	DF	2016–	26	1	
149=	Gábor Gyepes	DF	2002–2009	26	1	
149=	Vilmos Kohut	FW	1925–1938	26	14	
149=	Gyula Polgár	DF	1932–1942	26	2	
149=	Sándor Zombori	MF	1975–1980	26	3	
154=	János Bánfi	DF	1992–1997	25	0	
154=	Dezső Bundzsák	FW	1956–1961	25	1	
154=	Miklós Fehér	FW	1998–2003	25	7	
154=	Dániel Gazdag*	MF	2019–	25	4	
154=	Sándor Gujdár	GK	1970–1979	25	0	
154=	István Hamar	MF	1993–2001	25	4	
154=	Jenő Károly	MF	1903–1918	25	10	
154=	Zsolt Lőw	DF	2002–2008	25	1	
154=	Mihály Mracskó	MF	1993–1997	25	0	
154=	László Nagy	FW	1970–1980	25	7	
154=	László Pusztai	FW	1976–1969	25	5	
154=	Béla Sárosi	MF	1939–1935	25	1	
154=	András Schäfer*	MF	2020–	25	3	
154=	György Szűcs	MF	1934–1939	25	0	
154=	Attila Tököli	FW	2000–2011	25	3	
154=	Zoltán Végh	GK	1991–2007	25	0	
154=	Jenő Vincze	FW	1930–1939	25	8	
