= 1978 FIFA World Cup qualification (UEFA) =

Tournament details
- Teams: 31 (from 1 confederation)

Tournament statistics
- Top scorer: (Italy) Roberto Bettega (9 goals)

Listed below are the dates and results for the qualification to the 1978 FIFA World Cup rounds for the European zone (UEFA) in association football. For an overview of the qualification rounds, see the article 1978 FIFA World Cup qualification.

The European zone was allocated 9.5 places (out of 16) in the final tournament. West Germany, the defending champions, qualified automatically, leaving 8.5 spots open for competition between 31 teams. Albania and Liechtenstein were the only UEFA teams to not enter the competition.

The 31 teams were divided into 9 groups of 3 or 4 teams each (five groups with 3 teams and four groups with 4 teams). The teams would play against each other on a home-and-away basis. The winners of groups 1 to 8 would qualify, the winner of group 9 would advance to the UEFA / CONMEBOL Intercontinental Play-off.

== Draw ==
The draw for the qualifying groups took place in Guatemala City on 20 November 1975. During the draw procedure, entrants were drawn into the 9 qualifying groups from the four pots of seeds.

Pot A	Pot B	Pot C	Pot D
Bulgaria; East Germany; Italy; Netherlands; Poland; Scotland; Sweden; Yugoslavia; Soviet Union	Austria; Belgium; Czechoslovakia; England; France; Hungary; Portugal; Spain; Switzerland	Denmark; Finland; Greece; Republic of Ireland; Northern Ireland; Norway; Romania; Turkey; Wales	Cyprus; Iceland; Luxembourg; Malta

== Summary ==
Below is a table containing all nine qualifying groups. Teams that qualified and secured a place in the final tournament are highlighted in green, while teams who were eliminated are highlighted in red. The team that secured a place in the UEFA / CONMEBOL Intercontinental Play-off is highlighted in blue. Teams are ordered by final group position.

Group 1	Group 2	Group 3	Group 4	Group 5	Group 6	Group 7	Group 8	Group 9
Poland	Italy	Austria	Netherlands	France	Sweden	Scotland	Spain	Hungary
Portugal Denmark Cyprus	England Finland Luxembourg	East Germany Turkey Malta	Belgium Northern Ireland Iceland	Bulgaria Republic of Ireland	Norway Switzerland	Czechoslovakia Wales	Romania Yugoslavia	Soviet Union Greece

Key:

- Teams highlighted in green qualified for the finals.
- Teams highlighted in blue advanced to the UEFA / CONMEBOL Intercontinental Play-off.

== Groups ==
=== Group 1 ===
Pos	Team	Pld	W	D	L	GF	GA	GD	Pts
1	Poland	6	5	1	0	17	4	+13	11
2	Portugal	6	4	1	1	12	6	+6	9
3	Denmark	6	2	0	4	14	12	+2	4
4	Cyprus	6	0	0	6	3	24	−21	0

=== Group 2 ===
Pos	Team	Pld	W	D	L	GF	GA	GD	Pts
1	Italy	6	5	0	1	18	4	+14	10
2	England	6	5	0	1	15	4	+11	10
3	Finland	6	2	0	4	11	16	−5	4
4	Luxembourg	6	0	0	6	2	22	−20	0

=== Group 3 ===
Pos	Team	Pld	W	D	L	GF	GA	GD	Pts
1	Austria	6	4	2	0	14	2	+12	10
2	East Germany	6	3	3	0	15	4	+11	9
3	Turkey	6	2	1	3	9	5	+4	5
4	Malta	6	0	0	6	0	27	−27	0

=== Group 4 ===
Pos	Team	Pld	W	D	L	GF	GA	GD	Pts
1	Netherlands	6	5	1	0	11	3	+8	11
2	Belgium	6	3	0	3	7	6	+1	6
3	Northern Ireland	6	2	1	3	7	6	+1	5
4	Iceland	6	1	0	5	2	12	−10	2

=== Group 5 ===
Pos	Team	Pld	W	D	L	GF	GA	GD	Pts
1	France	4	2	1	1	7	4	+3	5
2	Bulgaria	4	1	2	1	5	6	−1	4
3	Republic of Ireland	4	1	1	2	2	4	−2	3

=== Group 6 ===
Pos	Team	Pld	W	D	L	GF	GA	GD	Pts
1	Sweden	4	3	0	1	7	4	+3	6
2	Norway	4	2	0	2	3	4	−1	4
3	Switzerland	4	1	0	3	3	5	−2	2

=== Group 7 ===
Pos	Team	Pld	W	D	L	GF	GA	GD	Pts
1	Scotland	4	3	0	1	6	3	+3	6
2	Czechoslovakia	4	2	0	2	4	6	−2	4
3	Wales	4	1	0	3	3	4	−1	2

=== Group 8 ===
Pos	Team	Pld	W	D	L	GF	GA	GD	Pts
1	Spain	4	3	0	1	4	1	+3	6
2	Romania	4	2	0	2	7	8	−1	4
3	Yugoslavia	4	1	0	3	6	8	−2	2

=== Group 9 ===
Pos	Team	Pld	W	D	L	GF	GA	GD	Pts
1	Hungary	4	2	1	1	6	4	+2	5
2	Soviet Union	4	2	0	2	5	3	+2	4
3	Greece	4	1	1	2	2	6	−4	3

Hungary advanced to the UEFA–CONMEBOL play-off.

== Inter-confederation play-offs ==
Team 1	Agg.	Team 2	1st leg	2nd leg
Hungary	9–2	Bolivia	6–0	3–2

== Goalscorers ==
9 goals

- (Italy) Roberto Bettega

7 goals

- (Austria) Hans Krankl

5 goals

- (East Germany) Martin Hoffmann
- (Turkey) Cemil Turan

4 goals

- (East Germany) Joachim Streich
- (England) Kevin Keegan
- (Poland) Kazimierz Deyna
- (Poland) Grzegorz Lato
- (Portugal) Manuel Fernandes
- (Sweden) Thomas Sjöberg

3 goals

- (England) Mick Channon
- (France) Michel Platini
- (Hungary) Tibor Nyilasi
- (Italy) Francesco Graziani
- (Netherlands) Ruud Geels
- (Northern Ireland) Chris McGrath
- (Socialist Federal Republic of Yugoslavia) Safet Sušić

2 goals

- (Austria) Josef Stering
- (Belgium) Raoul Lambert
- (Bulgaria) Pavel Panov
- (Denmark) Lars Bastrup
- (Denmark) Henning Munk Jensen
- (Denmark) Per Røntved
- (Denmark) Allan Simonsen
- (East Germany) Hartmut Schade
- (England) Ray Kennedy
- (Finland) Aki Heiskanen
- (Finland) Esa Heiskanen
- (Finland) Olavi Rissanen
- (Greece) Mimis Papaioannou
- (Hungary) Zoltán Kereki
- (Hungary) András Törőcsik
- (Italy) Giancarlo Antognoni
- (Netherlands) Johan Cruyff
- (Netherlands) Johnny Rep
- (Northern Ireland) Gerry Armstrong
- (Poland) Andrzej Szarmach
- (Poland) Włodzimierz Lubański
- (Poland) Stanisław Terlecki
- (Portugal) Fernando Chalana
- (Portugal) Nené
- (Romania) Dudu Georgescu
- (Romania) Anghel Iordănescu
- (Scotland) Kenny Dalglish
- (Soviet Union) David Kipiani
- (Spain) Rubén Cano
- (Sweden) Bo Börjesson
- (Turkey) Sedat Özden
- (Wales) Leighton James

1 goal

- (Austria) Roland Hattenberger
- (Austria) Wilhelm Kreuz
- (Austria) Hans Pirkner
- (Austria) Herbert Prohaska
- (Austria) Walter Schachner
- (Belgium) Paul Courant
- (Belgium) Maurice Martens
- (Belgium) Gilbert Van Binst
- (Belgium) François Van der Elst
- (Belgium) Roger Van Gool
- (Bulgaria) Hristo Bonev
- (Bulgaria) Chavdar Tsvetkov
- (Bulgaria) Andrey Zhelyazkov
- (Cyprus) Takis Antoniou
- (Cyprus) Stefanis Michael
- (Cyprus) Stavros Stylianou
- (Czechoslovakia) Miroslav Gajdůšek
- (Czechoslovakia) Zdeněk Nehoda
- (Czechoslovakia) Antonín Panenka
- (Czechoslovakia) Ladislav Petráš
- (Denmark) Allan Hansen
- (Denmark) Jørgen Kristensen
- (Denmark) Benny Nielsen
- (Denmark) Kristen Nygaard
- (Denmark) Ole Rasmussen
- (Denmark) Niels Tune-Hansen
- (East Germany) Peter Kotte
- (East Germany) Wolfram Löwe
- (East Germany) Jürgen Sparwasser
- (East Germany) Gert Weber
- (England) Trevor Brooking
- (England) Trevor Francis
- (England) Paul Mariner
- (England) Stuart Pearson
- (England) Joe Royle
- (England) Dennis Tueart
- (Finland) Kai Haaskivi
- (Finland) Teppo Heikkinen
- (Finland) Ari Mäkynen
- (Finland) Jyrki Nieminen
- (Finland) Matti Paatelainen
- (France) Dominique Bathenay
- (France) Christian Dalger
- (France) Bernard Lacombe
- (France) Dominique Rocheteau
- (Hungary) László Fazekas
- (Hungary) István Halász
- (Hungary) László Nagy
- (Hungary) Sándor Pintér
- (Hungary) László Pusztai
- (Hungary) Béla Várady
- (Hungary) Sándor Zombori
- (Iceland) Ingi Björn Albertsson
- (Iceland) Ásgeir Sigurvinsson
- (Republic of Ireland) Liam Brady
- (Republic of Ireland) Don Givens
- (Italy) Romeo Benetti
- (Italy) Franco Causio
- (Italy) Claudio Gentile
- (Italy) Renato Zaccarelli
- (Luxembourg) Nico Braun
- (Luxembourg) Gilbert Zender
- (Netherlands) Ruud Krol
- (Netherlands) Willem van Hanegem
- (Netherlands) René van de Kerkhof
- (Netherlands) Willy van de Kerkhof
- (Northern Ireland) Sammy McIlroy
- (Northern Ireland) Derek Spence
- (Norway) Odd Iversen
- (Norway) Tom Lund
- (Norway) Rune Ottesen
- (Poland) Zbigniew Boniek
- (Poland) Bohdan Masztaler
- (Poland) Włodzimierz Mazur
- (Portugal) Rui Jordão
- (Portugal) Octávio Machado
- (Portugal) Seninho
- (Portugal) Francisco Vital
- (Romania) László Bölöni
- (Romania) Iosif Vigu
- (Scotland) Asa Hartford
- (Scotland) Joe Jordan
- (Scotland) Don Masson
- (Soviet Union) Leonid Burjak
- (Soviet Union) Anatoliy Konkov
- (Spain) Eugenio Leal
- (Spain) Pirri
- (Sweden) Björn Andersson
- (Switzerland) Peter Risi
- (Switzerland) Claudio Sulser
- (Switzerland) Serge Trinchero
- (Turkey) Mehmet Özgül
- (Turkey) Volkan Yayim
- (Wales) Nick Deacy
- (Socialist Federal Republic of Yugoslavia) Zoran Filipović
- (Socialist Federal Republic of Yugoslavia) Dražen Mužinić
- (Socialist Federal Republic of Yugoslavia) Aleksandar Trifunović

1 own goal

- (Hungary) László Bálint (playing against the Soviet Union)
- (Spain) Gregorio Benito (playing against Romania)
- (Wales) Ian Evans (playing against Scotland)

== See also ==
- 1978 FIFA World Cup qualification
- 1978 FIFA World Cup qualification (CONMEBOL)
- 1978 FIFA World Cup qualification (CONCACAF)
- 1978 FIFA World Cup qualification (CAF)
- 1978 FIFA World Cup qualification (AFC and OFC)
