= 1978 FIFA World Cup final =

World Cup final, held in Argentina

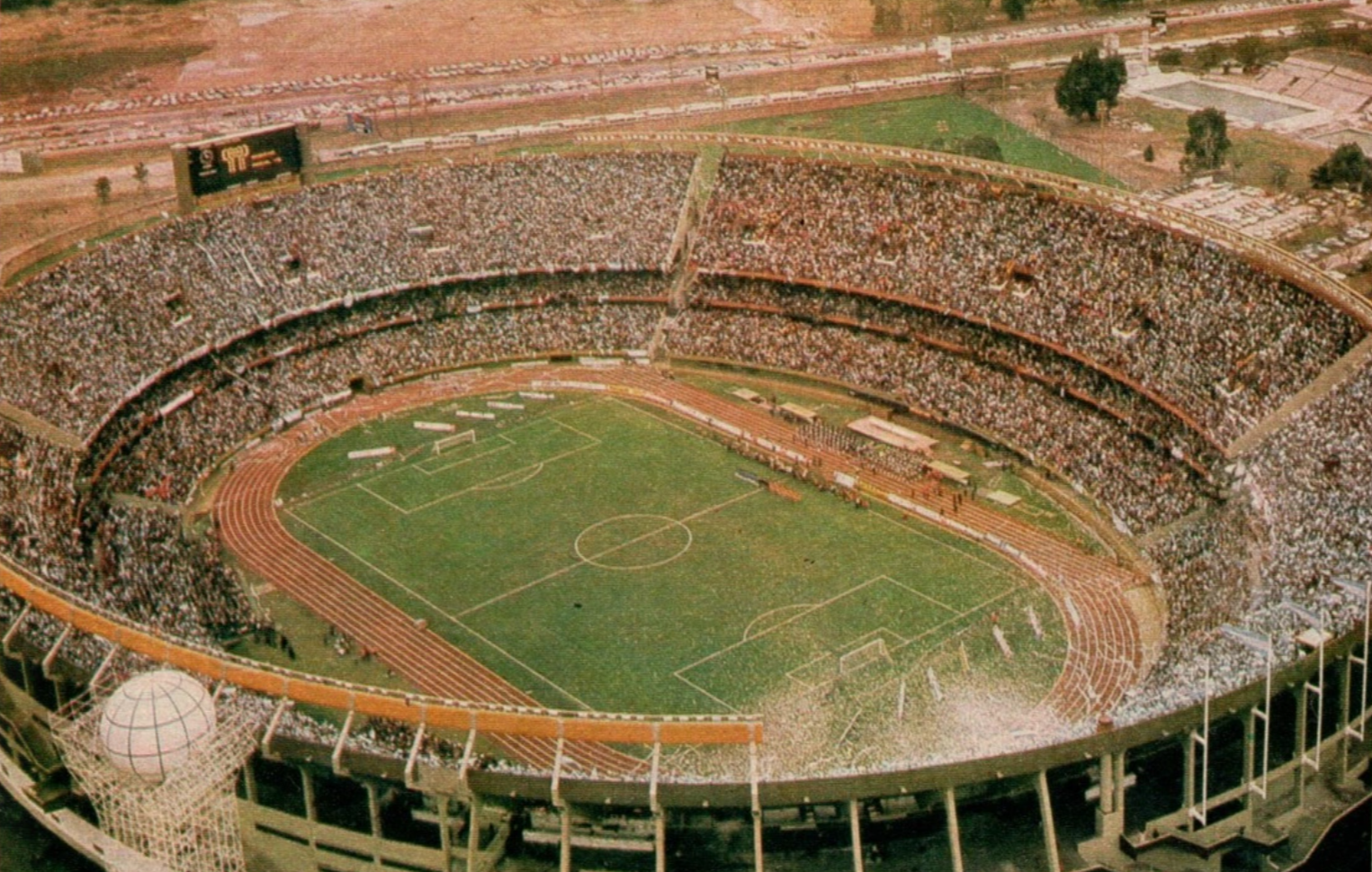
- Aerial view of the stadium prior to the final.
- Event: 1978 FIFA World Cup
Argentina	Netherlands
3	1
- After extra time
- Date: 25 June 1978
- Venue: Estadio Monumental, Buenos Aires
- Referee: Sergio Gonella (Italy)
- Attendance: 71,483

The final match of the 1978 FIFA World Cup, the eleventh edition of FIFA's football compilation for men's national teams, was played at the Estadio Monumental in Buenos Aires, Argentina, on 25 June 1978, and was contested by Argentina and the Netherlands.

The tournament featured host Argentina and defending champions West Germany, as well as 14 other teams who emerged from the qualification phase, organized by the six FIFA confederations. The sixteen teams competed in the first group stage, in which 8 teams qualified for the second group stage, before four teams advanced to the knockout stage. En route to the final, Argentina finished second in Group 1, which included Italy, France, and Hungary, before winning Group B with two wins and one draw. The Netherlands also finished second in Group 4 before finishing atop Group A with two wins and one draw.

Mario Kempes, who finished as the tournament's top scorer, was named the man of the match. The Netherlands team lost their second consecutive World Cup final, both times to the host nation, after losing to West Germany in 1974.

== Background ==
The 1978 FIFA World Cup was the eleventh edition of the World Cup, FIFA's compilation for national teams, held in Argentina between 1 and 25 June 1978. Argentina and West Germany qualified automatically for the finals — Argentina as hosts and West Germany as winners of the previous World Cup. The remaining 14 spots were decided through qualifying rounds held from March 1976 and December 1977, organized by the six FIFA confederations and involving 104 teams. In the finals, the teams were divided into four groups of four, with each team playing each other in a round-robin format. The top two teams from each group advanced to a second group stage, where the teams were split into two groups of four.

Argentina and the Netherlands had previously played each other twice—in a friendly match at the Olympic Stadium on 26 May 1974, which the Netherlands won 4–0, and in Group A of the 1974 World Cup on 26 June—their most recent meeting—which the Netherlands won 4–0. Neither of the two finalists had previously won the World Cup. Argentina had previously finished as runners-up in the 1930 tournament, losing 4–2 in the final to Uruguay, while the Netherlands finished in second place after being defeated 2–1 in the final by West Germany in the 1974 tournament.

The final was hosted at the Estadio Monumental in Buenos Aires, Argentina. The stadium first opened in May 1936 and is home to the Argentina national football team. It had previously hosted the South American Championship, now called Copa América, in 1946 and 1959. The match ball used for the tournament was the Adidas Tango, which was made specifically for the World Cup.

== Route to the final ==
=== Argentina ===
Argentina's route to the final
	Opponent	Result
1	Hungary	2–1
2	France	2–1
3	Italy	0–1
4	Poland	2–0
5	Brazil	0–0
6	Peru	6–0

Argentina were drawn into Group 1 for the World Cup, in which they were joined by Italy, France, and Hungary. Their first match was against Hungary at the Estadio Monumental in Buenos Aires on 2 June. Károly Csapó gave Hungary the lead after ten minutes, scoring from a rebound after goalkeeper Ubaldo Fillol saved his shot. Five minutes later, Leopoldo Luque equalized for Argentina after goalkeeper Sándor Gujdár lost hold of Mario Kempes's free kick. Daniel Bertoni scored from a cross to seal a 2–1 victory for Argentina. Their second match was against France in Buenos Aires on 6 June. Daniel Passarella scored from a penalty to give Argentina the lead one minute before halftime, before Michel Platini scored from Henri Michel's header to equalize for France in the 60th minute. Argentina retook the lead in the 74th minute when Luque struck a 27 yards (24 m) shot into the French goal. Argentina held on to record a 2–1 win. Their third match was against Italy in Buenos Aires on 10 June. Roberto Bettega scored the only goal of the game from Paolo Rossi's pass. Argentina qualified as runners-up for the second group stage.

In Group B, Argentina's opponents in their first group game were Poland at the Estadio Gigante de Arroyito in Rosario on 14 June. Fifteen minutes into the game, Kempes scored from Bertoni's curling cross to give Argentina the lead. In the 71st minute, Osvaldo Ardiles passed the ball to Bertoni, who hit a drive shot past goalkeeper Jan Tomaszewski and into the goal to give Argentina a 2–0 victory. In their second group game, Argentina played Brazil in Rosario on 18 June. The match ended goalless, leaving the Group B results to be decided by Argentina–Peru and Brazil–Poland matches. Argentina's third and final group game was against Peru, with the match taking place in Rosario on 21 June. Due to goal difference, Argentina needed to score four goals to surpass Brazil and qualify for the final. Argentina won 6–0 with goals from Kempes, Alberto Tarantini, Leopoldo Luque, and René Houseman.

=== The Netherlands ===
The Netherlands's route to the final
	Opponent	Result
1	Iran	3–0
2	Peru	0–0
3	Scotland	2–3
4	Austria	5–1
5	West Germany	2–2
6	Italy	2–1

The Netherlands were drawn into Group 4, alongside Scotland, Peru, and Iran. Their first group game was against Iran at the Estadio Malvinas Argentinas in Mendoza on 3 June. The Netherlands won 3–0 with Rob Rensenbrink scoring all three goals, two of which came from the penalty spot. In their next match, the Netherlands faced Peru in Mendoza on 7 June; the match ended goalless. The Netherlands' opponents in their third group game were Scotland in Mendoza on 11 June. The Netherlands scored the first goal in the 34th minute through Rensenbrink, before Kenny Dalglish equalized for Scotland before the end of halftime. Two minutes into the second half, Archie Gemmill scored from a penalty to give Scotland the lead, with him extending their lead in the 68th minute. Three minutes later, Johnny Rep scored from 30 yards (27 m) to pull a goal back for the Netherlands, and the match ultimately ended 3–2.

In Group A, the Netherlands' first match was against Austria at the Estadio Mario Alberto Kempes in Córdoba on 14 June. The Netherlands took the lead after six minutes through Ernie Brandts, with the other four goals scored by Rensenbrink via penalty—his fifth goal of the tournament—Johnny Rep, and Willy van de Kerkhof. Erich Obermayer scored Austria's solo goal in the 80th minute, as the Netherlands won 5–1. In their second match, the Netherlands faced defending champions West Germany in Córdoba on 18 June. West Germany took the lead after three minutes through Rüdiger Abramczik, before Arie Haan levelled the score for the Netherlands in the 26th minute. Dieter Müller gave West Germany the lead in the 70th minute, with Kerkhof equalising twelve minutes later. The match finished 2–2. Their final group game was against Italy at the Estadio Monumental in Buenos Aires on 21 June. In the ninth minute, Brandts scored an own goal while trying to save Roberto Bettega's shot. Italy held on to the lead until the 49th minute, when Brandts equalized the score, with Haan scoring the winning goal from 40 yards (36 m) in what Reuters described as the "hottest shots of the tournament."

== Match ==
=== Summary ===
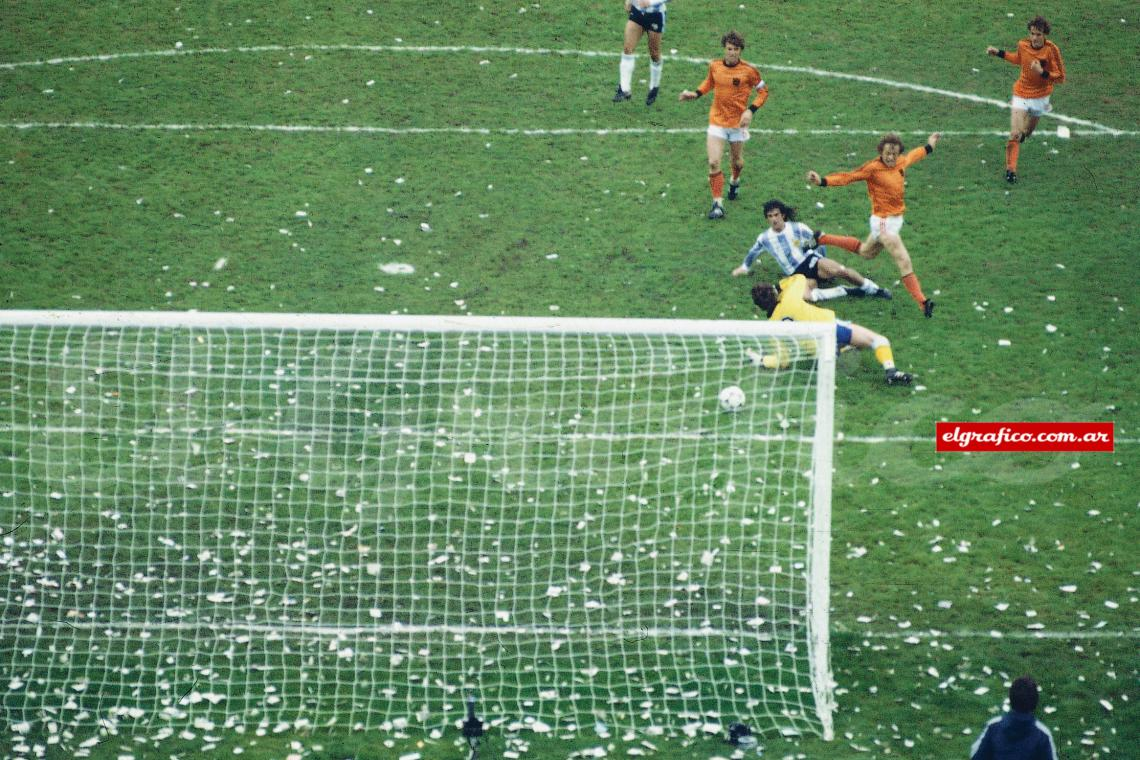
Mario Kempes scoring the first goal of the match

The final took place on 25 June 1978 at the Estadio Monumental in Buenos Aires in front of 71,483 supporters, and was refereed by Sergio Gonella from Italy. The start of the final was mired in controversy, as the Dutch accused the Argentines of using stalling tactics to delay the match, causing tension to build in front of a hostile Buenos Aires crowd. The host team eventually emerged five minutes late after the audience was whipped into a frenzy. The Argentines also questioned the legality of a plaster cast on René van de Kerkhof's wrist, although he had worn it for earlier games without objections, causing the Dutch to threaten to leave the pitch. The Italian referee, Sergio Gonella, upheld the complaints and forced Van de Kerkhof to apply extra bandage. In retaliation, the Netherlands team refused to attend the post-match ceremonies.

Six minutes into the game, the Netherlands had a chance to score when Johnny Rep met Arie Haan's free kick with a header, but went wide of the goal. Nine minutes later, Ruud Krol was booked for a tackle on Bertoni. In the 25th minute, Argentina had an opportunity when Daniel Passarella received Jorge Olguín's cross and hit a goal-bound shot, but it went above the Dutch goal. Argentina took the lead in the 38th minute through Mario Kempes: Leopoldo Luque received a pass from Osvaldo Ardiles and kicked the ball to Kempes, who struck a low shot into the goal. The first half finished with Argentina leading 1-0.

In the 51st minute, Argentina had a chance to score when Leopoldo Luque ran past Brandts, but goalkeeper Jan Jongbloed ran out of the penalty area and kicked the ball away. The Netherlands made a substitution in the 60th minute with Dick Nanninga replacing Rep. In the 81st minute, Nanninga received Johan Neeskens' cross and ran past multiple Dutch players in the penalty area before striking the ball past goalkeeper Ubaldo Fillol to equalize the score for the Netherlands. In the final second of regular time, Rensenbrink's shot struck the crossbar, and the match went into extra time. Despite various tackles by the Netherlands, Argentina continued to press, and in the 104th minute, Kempes took a shot that went between the Dutch defenders and into the net to double their lead. Six minutes before the end of extra time, Bertoni received Kempes's pass and scored the winning goal from a low shot.

=== Details ===
25 June 1978
15:00 UTC−3

Argentina	3–1 (a.e.t.)	Netherlands
Kempes 38', 105'; Bertoni 115'		Nanninga 82'

River Plate Stadium, Buenos Aires
Attendance: 71,483
Referee: Sergio Gonella (Italy)

Argentina	Netherlands

GK	5	Ubaldo Fillol
RB	15	Jorge Olguín
CB	7	Luis Galván
CB	19	Daniel Passarella (c)
LB	20	Alberto Tarantini
DM	6	Américo Gallego
CM	2	Osvaldo Ardiles	(yellow card) 40'	(substituted off) 66'
AM	10	Mario Kempes
RW	4	Daniel Bertoni
LW	16	Oscar Ortiz		(substituted off) 75'
CF	14	Leopoldo Luque
Substitutes:
GK	3	Héctor Baley
MF	1	Norberto Alonso
MF	8	Rubén Galván
RW	9	René Houseman		(substituted on) 75'
CM	12	Omar Larrosa	(yellow card) 93'	(substituted on) 66'
Manager:
César Luis Menotti

GK	8	Jan Jongbloed
SW	5	Ruud Krol (c)	(yellow card) 15'
RB	6	Wim Jansen		(substituted off) 73'
CB	22	Ernie Brandts
LB	2	Jan Poortvliet	(yellow card) 96'
RM	13	Johan Neeskens
CM	9	Arie Haan
LM	11	Willy van de Kerkhof
RF	10	René van de Kerkhof
CF	16	Johnny Rep		(substituted off) 58'
LF	12	Rob Rensenbrink
Substitutes:
GK	19	Pim Doesburg
DF	4	Adrie van Kraay
DF	17	Wim Rijsbergen
FW	18	Dick Nanninga		(substituted on) 58'
DF	20	Wim Suurbier	(yellow card) 94'	(substituted on) 73'
Manager:
(Austria) Ernst Happel

Assistant referees
Ramón Barreto (Uruguay)
Erich Linemayr (Austria)

Match rules

- 90 minutes
- 30 minutes of extra time if scores level
- Replay on 27 June if scores still level
- Five substitutes named, maximum of two used

== See also ==
- Argentina–Netherlands football rivalry
- Argentina at the FIFA World Cup
- Netherlands at the FIFA World Cup
