= Zombori =

Zombori is a surname. Notable people with the surname include:

- Gábor Zombori (born 2002), Hungarian swimmer
- Ödön Zombori (1907–1989), Hungarian wrestler
- Sándor Zombori (born 1951), Hungarian footballer
- Vilmos Zombori (1906–1993), Romanian footballer
- Zalán Zombori (born 1975), Hungarian footballer, son of Sándor
