= Márton Dárdai =

Hungarian footballer (born 2002)

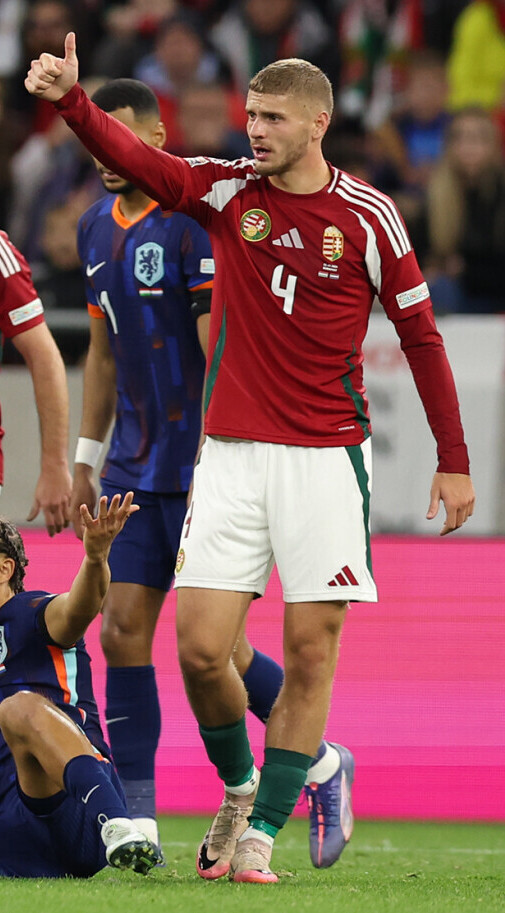
- Dárdai with Hungary in 2024

Personal information
- Date of birth: 12 February 2002 (age 24)
- Place of birth: Berlin, Germany
- Height: 1.88 m (6 ft 2 in)
- Position: Centre-back

Team information
- Current team: Hertha BSC
- Number: 31

Youth career
- Seeburger SV
- –2012: 1. FC Wilmersdorf
- 2012–2020: Hertha BSC

Senior career*
Years	Team	Apps	(Gls)
2020–2022	Hertha BSC II	7	(0)
2020–	Hertha BSC	129	(1)

International career^{‡}
2018	Germany U16	1	(0)
2018–2019	Germany U17	14	(1)
2020	Germany U19	1	(0)
2022–2023	Germany U21	8	(0)
2024–	Hungary	20	(0)
- * Club domestic league appearances and goals as of 3 May 2026 ‡ National team caps and goals as of 21:04, 31 March 2026 (UTC)

Márton Dárdai (born 12 February 2002) is a professional footballer who plays as a centre-back for 2. Bundesliga club Hertha BSC. Born in Germany, he plays for the Hungary national team. He's also son of the former Hungarian international Pál Dárdai.

== Club career ==
Dárdai began his youth career with Seeburger SV and 1. FC Wilmersdorf, before joining the youth academy of Hertha BSC in 2012. He made his professional debut for Hertha BSC in the Bundesliga on 7 November 2020, coming on as a substitute for Dedryck Boyata in the second minute of second-half stoppage time against FC Augsburg, which finished as a 3–0 away win.

On 19 December 2025, he was hospitalized due to viral infection.

== International career ==
As he was born in Berlin to Hungarian parents, Dárdai was eligible to represent both Germany or Hungary internationally. He represented Germany at under-16, under-17, under-19 and under-21 level, making a total of 24 appearances for the nation of his birth at youth level.

On 21 November 2023, Dárdai, in an interview published by Kicker said that he had not decided which nation he would represent at senior level. He met with Marco Rossi, the coach of Hungary, to discuss his intentions in December 2023.

On 22 January 2024, Dárdai announced his decision to represent the Hungary national team at senior level, emulating his father Pál and elder brother Palkó who are both full internationals for Hungary.

On 12 March 2024, Dárdai received his first call-up to the Hungarian national team ahead of friendly matches against Turkey and Kosovo. On 22 March, he came on as a substitute for Botond Balogh in the 67th minute of the match against Turkey at the Puskás Aréna, gaining his first senior international cap. Four days later, he made his first start for the team, playing the full 90 minutes in central defence as Hungary beat Kosovo 2–0.

On 14 May 2024, Dárdai was named in Hungary's squad for UEFA Euro 2024. In the team's opening match of the tournament, he came on as a 79th-minute substitute for Attila Szalai as the Magyars were beaten 3–1 by Switzerland in Cologne. On 19 June, he started against his birth nation Germany in a 2–0 loss in Stuttgart. He again started in the third Group A match against Scotland on 23 June, playing 74 minutes before being replaced by Szalai.

== Personal life ==
Dárdai is the son of Hungarian manager and former footballer Pál Dárdai, and the brother of the footballers Palkó and Bence Dárdai. Márton's grandfather was also a footballer and manager, and also named Pál Dárdai.

== Career statistics ==
=== Club ===
As of match played 22 November 2026

Appearances and goals by club, season and competition
Club	Season	League			Cup		Continental		Other		Total	
Club	Season	Division	Apps	Goals	Apps	Goals	Apps	Goals	Apps	Goals	Apps	Goals
Hertha BSC II	2019–20	Regionalliga Nordost	3	0	0	0	—		0	0	3	0
Hertha BSC II	2020–21	Regionalliga Nordost	3	0	0	0	—		0	0	3	0
Hertha BSC II	2021–22	Regionalliga Nordost	1	0	0	0	—		0	0	1	0
Hertha BSC II	Total		7	0	0	0	0	0	0	0	7	0
Hertha BSC	2020–21	Bundesliga	12	0	0	0	—		0	0	12	0
Hertha BSC	2021–22	Bundesliga	12	0	1	0	—		0	0	13	0
Hertha BSC	2022–23	Bundesliga	17	1	0	0	—		0	0	17	1
Hertha BSC	2023–24	2. Bundesliga	29	0	4	0	—		0	0	33	0
Hertha BSC	2024–25	2. Bundesliga	30	0	3	0	—		—		33	0
Hertha BSC	2025–26	2. Bundesliga	29	0	4	0	—		—		33	0
Hertha BSC	2026-27	2. Bundesliga	4	0	1	0	—		—		5	0
Hertha BSC	Total		133	1	13	0	0	0	0	0	146	1
Career total			141	1	13	0	0	0	0	0	154	1

=== International ===
As of match played 31 March 2026

Appearances and goals by national team, year and competition
National team	Year	Apps	Goals
Hungary	2024	11	0
Hungary	2025	7	0
Hungary	2026	2	0
Total		20	0
