= Mirosław Justek =

Polish footballer (1948–1998)

Personal information
- Date of birth: 23 September 1948
- Place of birth: Słupsk, Poland
- Date of death: 24 January 1998 (aged 49)
- Place of death: Poznań, Poland
- Height: 1.77 m (5 ft 10 in)
- Position: Defender

Youth career
- –1967: Cieśliki Słupsk

Senior career*
Years	Team	Apps	(Gls)
1967–1976	Pogoń Szczecin	153	(13)
1976–1979	Lech Poznań	78	(7)
1979–1980	FC Antwerp	18	(1)
1980–1982	Charleroi		
1982–1983	Libramont		

International career
1978	Poland	3	(0)
- * Club domestic league appearances and goals

Mirosław Justek (23 September 1948 – 24 January 1998) was a Polish footballer who played as a defender.

== Club career ==
He played mostly for Pogoń Szczecin and Lech Poznań. He later moved to Belgium, where he played for Royal Antwerp, Charleroi and Libramont.

== International career ==
He was capped three times for the Poland national team and was in the reserve for the 1978 FIFA World Cup.
