= Moktar Hasni =

Tunisian footballer (1952–2024)

Personal information
- Date of birth: 19 March 1952
- Place of birth: Siliana, French Tunisia
- Date of death: 21 January 2024 (aged 71)
- Position: Forward

Senior career*
Years	Team	Apps	(Gls)
1970–1971	US Silana	135	(22)
1971–1975	EM Mahdia	135	(22)
1976–1977	UBS Auvelais		
1977–1980	La Louvière		
1980–1982	RRC Tournai		
1982–1983	Calais RUFC		
1983–1984	ROC Charleroi		

International career
1973–1978	Tunisia	9	(0)
- * Club domestic league appearances and goals

Moktar Hasni (19 March 1952 – 21 January 2024) was a Tunisian professional footballer who played as a forward during his club career and for the Tunisia national team. He was part of the Tunisian team at the 1978 FIFA World Cup.

== Career ==
Hasni played for Calais RUFC.

== Death ==
Hasni died on 21 January 2024, at the age of 71.
