= Alireza Ghashghaean =

Iranian footballer (born 1954)

Personal information
- Full name: Alireza Ghashghaean
- Date of birth: 27 February 1954 (age 72)
- Place of birth: Shiraz, Iran
- Position: Defender

Senior career*
Years	Team	Apps	(Gls)
1970s	Bargh Shiraz F.C.		
- Falu FK
- FC Trollhättan

International career
1975–1978	Iran	5	(0)
- * Club domestic league appearances and goals

Alireza Ghashghaean (born 27 February 1954) is a retired Iranian football player.

== Club career ==
He played for Bargh Shiraz F.C., Falu BS and Trollhättans FK (Sweden).

== International career ==
He played for the Iran national football team and participated at the 1978 FIFA World Cup as a member of the squad.
