= Leopoldo Luque =

Argentine footballer (1949–2021)

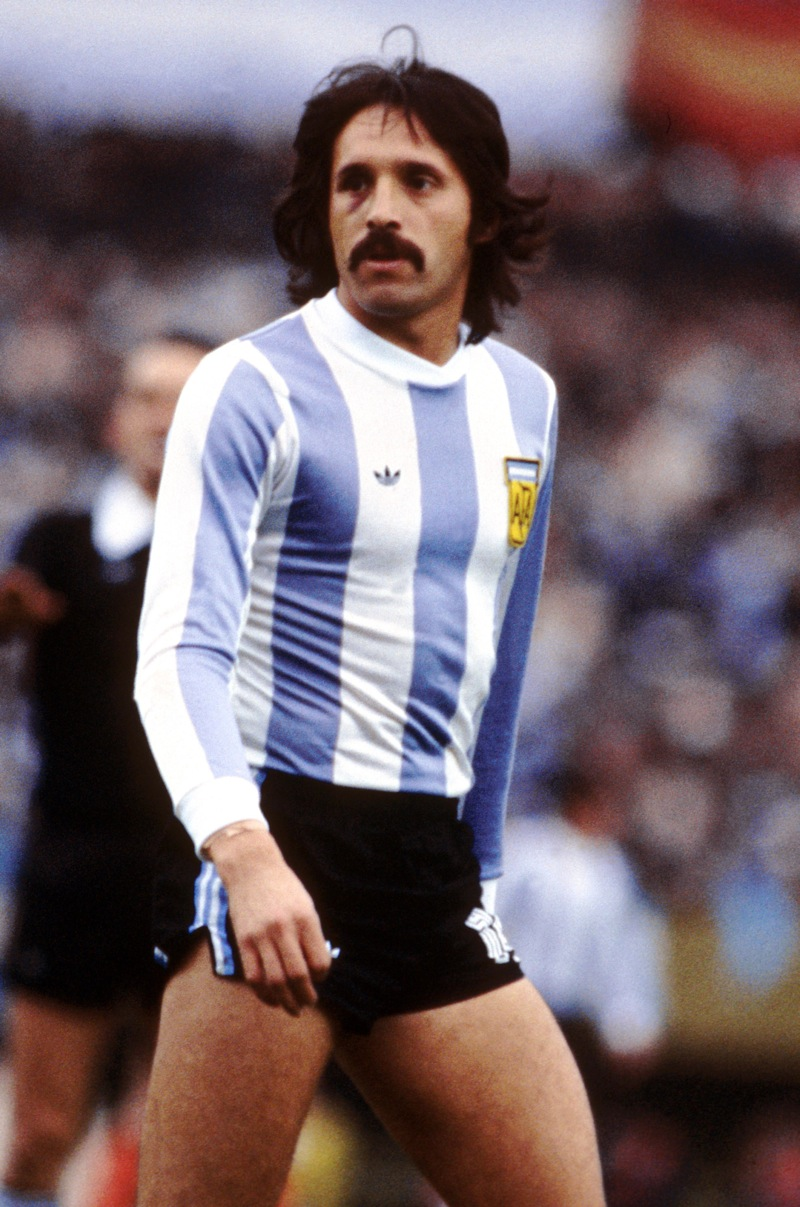
- Luque with Argentina at the 1978 FIFA World Cup

Personal information
- Full name: Leopoldo Jacinto Luque
- Date of birth: 3 May 1949
- Place of birth: Santa Fe, Argentina
- Date of death: 15 February 2021 (aged 71)
- Place of death: Mendoza, Argentina
- Height: 1.78 m (5 ft 10 in)
- Position: Striker

Senior career*
Years	Team	Apps	(Gls)
1967–1969	Gimnasia de Jujuy		
1969–1971	Central Norte		
1971	Unión		
1972	Rosario Central	4	(3)
1973–1975	Unión	35	(10)
1975–1980	River Plate	176	(75)
1980–1981	Unión	24	(10)
1981	Tampico	4	(2)
1982	Racing Club	11	(2)
1983	Santos	2	(0)
1983–1984	Chacarita Juniors	11	(0)
1984	Santos		
1984–1985	Boca Unidos		

International career
1975–1981	Argentina	44	(22)
Medal record
Representing Argentina
FIFA World Cup
Winner	1978 Argentina	Team
- * Club domestic league appearances and goals

Leopoldo Jacinto Luque (Spanish pronunciation: [leoˈpoldo xaˈsinto ˈluke]; 3 May 1949 – 15 February 2021) was an Argentine professional footballer who played as a striker. Regarded as one of the best forwards of the Argentina national team, he also won the 1978 FIFA World Cup.

== Club career ==
In a career spanning from 1972 to 1984 he played for Unión de Santa Fe, Rosario Central, River Plate, Racing Club de Avellaneda and Chacarita Juniors.

On 22 February 1976, Luque scored all five goals in a game in which his team, River Plate, defeated San Lorenzo de Almagro 5–1.

== International career ==
With Argentina he was 1978 World Champion, scoring four goals in the tournament, including a spectacular long distance volley against France during the first round. During that tournament, his younger brother Oscar died in a traffic accident on the day that Argentina played against France. He also seriously injured his left elbow in the match against France, the second game of that championship, forcing him to miss two matches. He was back for the last three matches of the tournament, including the final against the Netherlands.

== Later life and death ==
Luque was sports secretary of Mendoza Province.

In February 2007, Luque suffered a heart attack from which he recovered. He died from COVID-19 on 15 February 2021, during the COVID-19 pandemic in Argentina.

== Career statistics ==
=== Club ===
Appearances and goals by season and competition
League			Continental		Total	
Division	Apps	Goals	Apps	Goals	Apps	Goals
Primera División	261	100	31	9	292	109

=== FIFA World Cup statistics ===
	Apps	Goals	Result
1978 FIFA World Cup	5	4	Champions

=== International goals ===
Scores and results list Argentina's goal tally first, score column indicates score after each Luque goal.

List of international goals scored by Leopoldo Luque
No.	Date	Venue	Opponent	Score	Result	Competition
1	3 August 1975	Estadio Olímpico, Caracas, Venezuela	Venezuela	1–0	5–1	1975 Copa América
2	3 August 1975	Estadio Olímpico, Caracas, Venezuela	Venezuela	3–1	5–1	1975 Copa América
3	3 August 1975	Estadio Olímpico, Caracas, Venezuela	Venezuela	4–1	5–1	1975 Copa América
4	10 August 1975	Estadio Gigante de Arroyito, Rosario, Argentina	Venezuela	11–0	11–0	1975 Copa América
5	8 April 1976	José Amalfitani Stadium, Buenos Aires, Argentina	Uruguay	2–0	4–1	1976 Copa del Atlántico
6	9 June 1976	Estadio Centenario, Montevideo, Uruguay	Uruguay	1–0	3–0	1976 Copa del Atlántico
7	27 February 1977	Estadio Boca Juniors, Buenos Aires, Argentina	Hungary	3–0	5–1	Friendly
8	27 February 1977	Estadio Boca Juniors, Buenos Aires, Argentina	Hungary	5–0	5–1	Friendly
9	29 May 1977	Estadio Boca Juniors, Buenos Aires, Argentina	Poland	2–1	3–1	Friendly
10	24 August 1977	Estadio Boca Juniors, Buenos Aires, Argentina	Paraguay	1–0	3–0	Copa Félix Bogado
11	24 August 1977	Estadio Boca Juniors, Buenos Aires, Argentina	Paraguay	2–0	3–0	Copa Félix Bogado
12	23 March 1978	Estadio Nacional de Lima, Lima, Peru	Peru	1–0	3–1	1978 Copa Ramón Castilla
13	19 April 1978	Estadio Boca Juniors, Buenos Aires, Argentina	Republic of Ireland	3–?	3–1	Friendly
14	3 May 1978	Estadio Boca Juniors, Buenos Aires, Argentina	Uruguay	1–0	3–0	Friendly
5	2 June 1978	Estadio Monumental, Buenos Aires, Argentina	Hungary	1–1	2–1	1978 FIFA World Cup
16	6 June 1978	Estadio Monumental, Buenos Aires, Argentina	France	2–1	2–1	1978 FIFA World Cup
17	21 June 1978	Estadio Gigante de Arroyito, Rosario, Argentina	Peru	4–0	6–0	1978 FIFA World Cup
18	21 June 1978	Estadio Gigante de Arroyito, Rosario, Argentina	Peru	6–0	6–0	1978 FIFA World Cup
19	2 June 1979	Hampden Park, Glasgow, Scotland	Scotland	1–0	3–1	Friendly
20	2 June 1979	Hampden Park, Glasgow, Scotland	Scotland	2–0	3–1	Friendly
21	21 May 1980	Praterstadion, Vienna, Austria	Austria	2–0	5–1	Friendly
22	16 December 1980	Estadio Olímpico de Córdoba, Córdoba, Argentina	Switzerland	2–0	5–0	Friendly

== Honours ==
River Plate

- Primera División: 1975 Nacional, 1977 Metropolitano, 1979 Metropolitano, 1979 Nacional, 1980 Metropolitano
- Copa Libertadores runner-up: 1976

Argentina

- FIFA World Cup: 1978

Individual

- Copa América Top Scorer: 1975
