= István Kocsis (footballer, born 1949) =

Hungarian footballer (1949–1994)

Personal information
- Date of birth: 6 October 1949
- Place of birth: Csorna, Hungary
- Date of death: 9 June 1994 (aged 44)
- Place of death: Csorna, Hungary
- Height: 1.82 m (6 ft 0 in)
- Position: Defender

Youth career
- 1966–1968: Csornai MEDOSZ

Senior career*
Years	Team	Apps	(Gls)
1969–1975	Pécsi Mecsek FC	156	(10)
1975–1981	Budapest Honvéd	187	(1)
1981–1983	Lierse	66	(0)
1983–1984	FC Sopron		
1988–1990	Ostbahn 11		

International career
1977–1983	Hungary	20	(0)
- * Club domestic league appearances and goals

István Kocsis (6 October 1949 – 9 June 1994) was a Hungarian professional footballer who played as a defender. He participated in the 1978 World Cup in which Hungary was eliminated in the first round. His nicknames were Sandor and Pischta.

From 1975 to 1981, he played for Budapest Honvéd before moving to Belgium where he played for Lierse for two seasons (66 games), after which he decided to return to Hungary to play for FC Sopron, before ending his career in a lower-class Austrian team.

He died of cancer at the age of 44.
