= Alberto Tarantini =

Argentine footballer

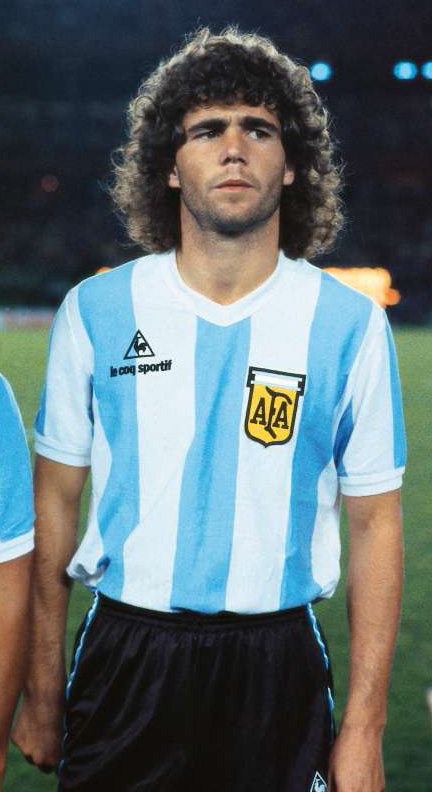
- Tarantini with the Argentina national team, 1982

Personal information
- Full name: Alberto César Tarantini
- Date of birth: 3 December 1955 (age 70)
- Place of birth: Ezeiza, Argentina
- Height: 1.78 m (5 ft 10 in)
- Positions: Left back; centre back

Senior career*
Years	Team	Apps	(Gls)
1973–1978	Boca Juniors	179	(0)
1978–1979	Birmingham City	23	(1)
1979	Talleres de Córdoba	13	(1)
1980–1983	River Plate	107	(4)
1983–1984	Bastia	29	(1)
1984–1988	Toulouse	130	(8)
1988–1989	St. Gallen	29	(0)
Total		510	(15)

International career
1974–1982	Argentina	61	(1)
Medal record
Representing Argentina
FIFA World Cup
Winner	1978 Argentina	Team
- * Club domestic league appearances and goals

Alberto César Tarantini (born 3 December 1955) is an Argentine former professional footballer who played as a defender. He won the 1978 FIFA World Cup with the Argentina national football team. He played as a defensive left back early in his career, and later as a wing back.

== Career ==
Born at Ezeiza, Tarantini rose through the Boca Juniors youth divisions in the early 1970s, and was noted for his afro hairdo and his large front teeth, which earned him the nickname conejo ("rabbit").

In 1977, with Boca Juniors, he won his first international club football competition, the Copa Libertadores, when after the goalless draw Boca defeated Cruzeiro 5–4 on penalties. The match was held at the Estadio Centenario in Montevideo, Uruguay on 14 September 1977.

Tarantini was part of the Argentina under-23 team that won the 1975 Toulon Tournament, together with Jorge Valdano, Américo Gallego, and others, with César Menotti as coach. He became the left-back of the Argentina national football team after Jorge Carrascosa left the team (the book El DT del Proceso by Gasparini and Ponsico claims that the wolf Carrascosa declined to play for the dictatorship). He was also, at 22, the youngest player of that team.

A few months before the 1978 FIFA World Cup, he had a contractual dispute with Boca that left him clubless, as Boca management pressured all Argentine clubs into denying him a new contract. After his performances during the World Cup (he scored a goal in the 6–0 victory against Peru, and played in the final against The Netherlands) he was signed by Birmingham City for £295,000. His spell in England was overshadowed by poor discipline, with Tarantini flattening Manchester United defender Brian Greenhoff, and ending his 23-game spell in Birmingham by wading into the crowd to punch a heckler.

After his return to Argentina he played for Talleres de Córdoba, River Plate, and European teams SC Bastia, Toulouse and FC St. Gallen.

In 1982, Tarantini was voted into the Top Ten of the South America Player of the Year awards.

Tarantini also played in the 1982 FIFA World Cup for Argentina.

== Personal life ==
Tarantini was married to fashion model Patricia "Pata" Villanueva. His brother George Tarantini was a former college soccer coach.

== Honours ==
=== Club ===
Boca Juniors

- Primera Division Argentina: Nacional 1976, Metropolitano 1976
- Copa Libertadores: 1977

River Plate

- Primera Division Argentina: Metropolitano 1980, Nacional 1981

=== International ===
Argentina Youth

- Toulon Tournament: 1975

Argentina

- FIFA World Cup: 1978

=== Individual ===
- FIFA World Cup All-Star Team: 1978
- AFA Team of All Time (published 2015)
- World Soccer World XI: 1978
- IFFHS Argentina All Times Dream Team (Team B): 2021
