= Péter Török =

Hungarian footballer

Personal information
- Date of birth: 18 April 1951
- Place of birth: Anarcs, Hungary
- Date of death: 20 September 1987 (aged 36)
- Place of death: Budapest, Hungary
- Position: Defender

Senior career*
Years	Team	Apps	(Gls)
1969–1982	Vasas	349	(10)
1982–1983	Recreativo de Huelva	?	(?)
1983–1984	Volán	?	(?)

International career
1973–1980	Hungary	35	(0)
- * Club domestic league appearances and goals

Péter Török (18 April 1951 – 20 September 1987) was a Hungarian football defender who played for Hungary in the 1978 FIFA World Cup. He also played for Vasas SC.
