= István Halász =

Hungarian footballer

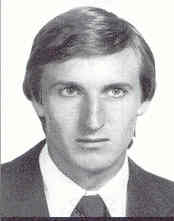

Personal information
- Date of birth: 12 October 1951
- Place of birth: Rakamaz, Hungary
- Date of death: 4 June 2016 (aged 64)
- Position: Midfielder

Youth career
- 1965–1974: Rakamaz

Senior career*
Years	Team	Apps	(Gls)
1974–1978	Tatabányai Bányász	103	(23)
1978–1982	Vasas SC	67	(8)
1982–1984	Nyíregyházi VSSC	47	(8)
1984–1985	Dorogi Bányász	25	(4)
1985–1986	Oroszlányi Bányász		

International career
1977–1978	Hungary	4	(2)
- * Club domestic league appearances and goals

István Halász (12 October 1951 – 4 June 2016) was a Hungarian football midfielder who played for Hungary in the 1978 FIFA World Cup. He also played for FC Tatabánya.
