= Béla Várady =

Hungarian footballer

Personal information
- Date of birth: 12 April 1953
- Place of birth: Gömörszőlős, Hungary
- Date of death: 23 January 2014 (aged 60)
- Place of death: Hungary
- Height: 1.83 m (6 ft 0 in)
- Position: Forward

Youth career
- Putnoki Bányász

Senior career*
Years	Team	Apps	(Gls)
1970–1971	Ózdi Kohász SE		
1971–1983	Vasas	332	(174)
1983–1985	Tours	36	(6)
1985	Vasas	6	(0)
1986–1988	Váci Izzó		
1988–1989	Pama		
1989–1990	Magyar Kábel SC		

International career
1972–1982	Hungary	36	(13)
- * Club domestic league appearances and goals

Olympic medal record

Representing Hungary

Men's football
Silver medal – second place	1972 Munich	Team competition

Béla Várady (12 April 1953 – 23 January 2014) was a Hungarian football forward who played for Hungary in the 1978 FIFA World Cup.

== Club career ==
A club legend with Vasas SC, he scored 174 league goals in 332 matches for them.

== Death ==
Varady died on 23 January 2014.
