= László Pusztai =

Hungarian footballer (1946–1987)

Personal information
- Full name: László Pusztai
- Date of birth: 1 March 1946
- Place of birth: Szentes, Hungary
- Date of death: 6 July 1987 (aged 41)
- Place of death: Hungary
- Height: 1.78 m (5 ft 10 in)
- Position: Striker

Senior career*
Years	Team	Apps	(Gls)
1965–1966	Szentesi Kinizsi		
1966–1969	Szegedi EAC	45	(11)
1969–1974	Budapest Honvéd FC	128	(50)
1974–1980	Ferencvárosi TC	152	(36)
1980–1983	SC Eisenstadt	33	(5)

International career
1970–1979	Hungary	25	(5)
- * Club domestic league appearances and goals

László Pusztai (1 March 1946 – 6 July 1987) was a Hungarian football player who participated in the 1978 World Cup where Hungary was eliminated in the first round.

After having spent numerous years in the Budapest clubs of Budapest Honvéd FC and Ferencvárosi TC, he went to Austria where he played for Eisenstadt for 3 years.

He was killed in a car accident, together with his wife, leaving two children behind.
