= András Törőcsik =

Hungarian footballer (1955–2022)

Personal information
- Date of birth: 1 May 1955
- Place of birth: Budapest, Hungary
- Date of death: 9 July 2022 (aged 67)
- Place of death: Budapest, Hungary
- Height: 1.72 m (5 ft 8 in)
- Position: Forward

Youth career
- 1967–1974: BVSC

Senior career*
Years	Team	Apps	(Gls)
1974–1985	Újpest Dozsa	236	(69)
1985–1986	Montpellier	26	(4)
1988	Volán		
1988	North York Rockets	5	(0)
1989	MTK Budapest	2	(0)

International career
1976–1984	Hungary	45	(12)
- * Club domestic league appearances and goals

András Törőcsik (1 May 1955 – 9 July 2022) was a Hungarian footballer of the 1970s and 1980s. From 1977 to 1984 he made 45 appearances and scored 12 goals for the Hungary national team.

== Club career ==
He started his career at Budapesti VSC and played the majority of his career for local giants Újpest. He also had spells abroad with Montpellier and North York Rockets and MTK Budapest as well as a season with Hungarian second tier-side Volán FC.

== International career ==
He made his debut for Hungary in an October 1976 friendly match away against Austria and earned a total of 45 caps scoring 12 goals. He appeared at the 1978 FIFA World Cup (where he was sent off against hosts Argentina) and the 1982 FIFA World Cup. At the latter tournament, Törőcsik was substituted in the world record 10-1 win over El Salvador by László Kiss, who went on to become the first ever player to score a hattrick as a sub during a World Cup.

His final international was an August 1984 friendly against Mexico.

== Death ==
He died of pneumonia in the Honvéd hospital in Budapest in July 2022.

== Honours ==
=== Club ===
Újpest

- Hungarian League: 1974–75, 1977–78, 1978–79
- Hungarian Cup: 1974–75, 1981–82, 1982–83
