= Zoltán Kereki =

Hungarian footballer

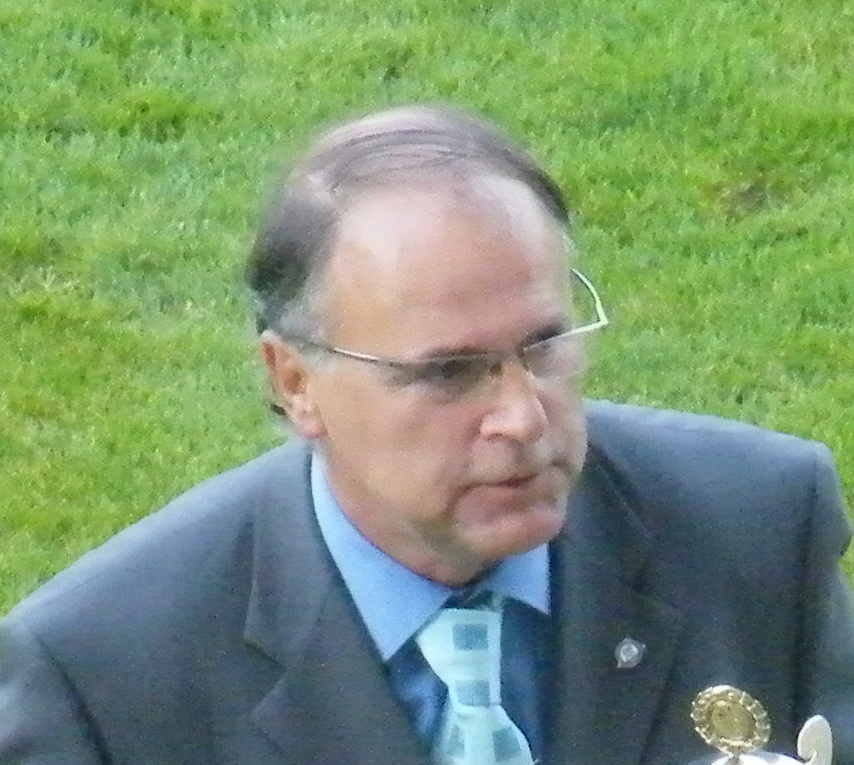

Personal information
- Date of birth: 13 July 1953 (age 73)
- Place of birth: Kőszeg, Hungary
- Position: Defender

Senior career*
Years	Team	Apps	(Gls)
1973–1979	Szombathelyi Haladás		
1979–1984	Zalaegerszegi TE	315	(50)

International career
1976–1980	Hungary	37	(7)
- * Club domestic league appearances and goals

Zoltán Kereki (born 13 July 1953) is a Hungarian football defender who played for Hungary in the 1978 FIFA World Cup. He also played for Szombathelyi Haladás.
