= László Nagy (footballer) =

Hungarian footballer

Personal information
- Date of birth: 21 October 1949 (age 77)
- Place of birth: Buzsák, Hungary
- Position: Striker

Senior career*
Years	Team	Apps	(Gls)
1968–83	Újpest FC	355	(94)
- FC Locarno

International career
1970–1980	Hungary	25	(7)

Managerial career
- 1996–1997: Újpest FC
- 1999–2001: Kecskeméti TE
- * Club domestic league appearances and goals

Olympic medal record

Representing Hungary

Men's football
Gold medal – first place	1968 Mexico City	Team competition

László Nagy (born 21 October 1949) is a retired Hungarian footballer who played for Újpesti Dózsa. Nagy is most famous for his participation in the gold medal-winning Hungarian team in the 1968 Summer Olympics, and for playing at the 1978 FIFA World Cup. He played 25 games and scored 7 goals for the Hungary national team. He also played a season for FC Locarno.

After his player career, Nagy became a coach, managing Újpest FC from 1996 to 1997.

== Sources ==
- MTI Ki Kicsoda 2006, Magyar Távirati Iroda, Budapest, 2005, p. 1233.
- Ki kicsoda a magyar sportéletben?, II. kötet (I–R). Szekszárd, Babits Kiadó, 1995, p. 358., ISBN 963-495-011-6
- Rejtő László–Lukács László–Szepesi György: Felejthetetlen 90 percek (Sportkiadó, 1977) ISBN 963-253-501-4
- Stats at MOB (p. 10.)
