= Sándor Gujdár =

Hungarian footballer

Personal information
- Full name: Sándor Gujdár
- Date of birth: 8 November 1951 (age 74)
- Place of birth: Szentes, Hungary
- Height: 1.84 m (6 ft 0 in)
- Position: Goalkeeper

Senior career*
Years	Team	Apps	(Gls)
1969–1970	Szentesi Kinizsi		
1970–1974	Szegedi EOL	50+ (Note: Total only includes appearances from the 1972–73 and the 1973–74 season.)	(0+)
1974–1982	Budapest Honved	247	(0)
1982–1984	Aris	33	(0)
1985–1989	Ostbahn XI		
Total		330+	(0+)

International career
1976–1979	Hungary	25	(0)
- * Club domestic league appearances and goals

Sándor Gujdár (born 8 November 1951) is a Hungarian former footballer who played as a goalkeeper. He played for Szegedi EOL, Honvéd, Aris, and the Hungary national football team - where he earned 25 caps - including two appearances at the 1978 FIFA World Cup Finals in Argentina. He became Hungarian champions with Honvéd in 1980. One year after he moved to Greece to play for Aris Thessaloniki, his professional career was cut short by a serious head injury. He resumed playing in 1986, and spent three years in Austria with lower-class Ostbahn XI. He later worked as a coach.

== Sources ==
- Sándor Gujdár at National-Football-Teams.com
- Gujdár volt a legjobb barát (in Hungarian)
- Mit mondjunk, bejött! – Korábbi magyar válogatott játékosok Maradona ma harmincéves bemutatkozásáról (in Hungarian)
- A negyedik helyezett: Gujdár Sándor (in Hungarian)
- olympiacos-sa.eoldal.hu: Gujdár Sándor (in Hungarian)
- stop.hu: Mi van Gujdár Sándorral?
- Ki kicsoda a magyar sportéletben?, I. kötet (A–H). Szekszárd, Babits Kiadó, 1994, 405. o., ISBN 963-495-008-6 (in Hungarian)
- Rejtő László–Lukács László–Szepesi György: Felejthetetlen 90 percek (Sportkiadó, 1977) ISBN 963-253-501-4 (in Hungarian)
