= Sándor Pintér (footballer) =

Hungarian footballer

Personal information
- Date of birth: 18 July 1950 (age 76)
- Place of birth: Pomáz, Hungary
- Position: Midfielder

Senior career*
Years	Team	Apps	(Gls)
1970–1981	Budapest Honvéd FC	247	(30)

International career
1975–1978	Hungary	39	(2)

Managerial career
- 2026: Csillaghegyi MTE
- * Club domestic league appearances and goals

Sándor Pintér (born 18 July 1950) is a Hungarian footballer who played as a midfielder for Hungary in the 1978 FIFA World Cup. He also played for Budapest Honvéd FC.

== Managerial career ==
In 2026, he managed Csillaghegyi MTE.
