= Sándor Zombori =

Hungarian footballer

Personal information
- Full name: Sándor Zombori
- Date of birth: 31 October 1951 (age 74)
- Place of birth: Pécs, Hungary
- Height: 1.71 m (5 ft 7 in)
- Position: Midfielder

Youth career
- 1959–1971: Pécsi Mecsek FC

Senior career*
Years	Team	Apps	(Gls)
1971–1975	Pécsi Mecsek FC	97	(12)
1975–1982	Vasas SC	168	(40)
1982–1985	Montpellier HSC	85	(14)
Total		350	(66)

International career
1975–1982	Hungary	26	(3)
- * Club domestic league appearances and goals

Sándor Zombori (born 31 October 1951 in Pécs) is a Hungarian football player who participated in the 1978 World Cup where Hungary was eliminated in the first round. Despite this early exit, Zombori scored a fine goal in his team's defeat to France.

== Career ==
From 1975 to 1982, he played for Vasas SC before leaving Hungary for France where he played for Montpellier Hérault Sport Club

In Montpellier Hérault SC, He played 85 matches and scored 14 goals in the French second division and in the French Cup, he played in 6 games and scored 3 goals.

His son Zalán was formed at Montpellier HSC during the 1992–1993 season.
