= 1982 FIFA World Cup Group 3 =

Football tournament group stage

Group 3 was one of six groups of national teams competing in the group stage of the 1982 FIFA World Cup. Play began on 13 June with the opening match of the tournament and ended on 23 June 1982. The group consisted of four teams: The seeded team, the reigning world champions Argentina, Belgium, Hungary and El Salvador.

Belgium won the group and advanced to the second round, along with Argentina. Despite recording the biggest victory in World Cup history, Hungary failed to advance.

== Standings ==
Pos	Team	Pld	W	D	L	GF	GA	GD	Pts	Qualification
1	Belgium	3	2	1	0	3	1	+2	5	Advance to second round
2	Argentina	3	2	0	1	6	2	+4	4	Advance to second round
3	Hungary	3	1	1	1	12	6	+6	3	
4	El Salvador	3	0	0	3	1	13	−12	0	

Source: FIFA

== Matches ==
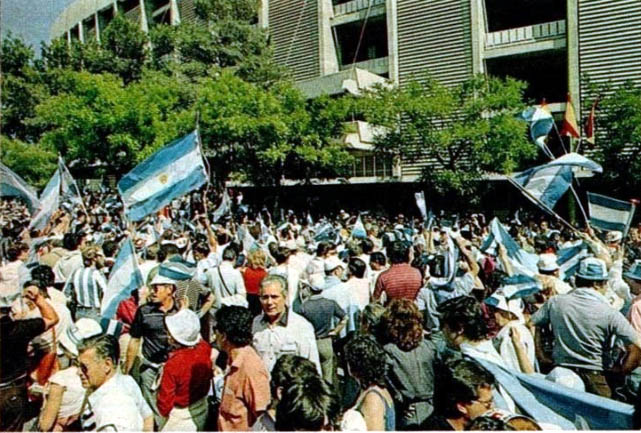
Argentina supporters outside the Camp Nou stadium

=== Argentina vs Belgium ===
13 June 1982
20:00 CEST

Argentina	0–1	Belgium
		Vandenbergh 62'

Camp Nou, Barcelona
Attendance: 95,000
Referee: Vojtech Christov (Czechoslovakia)

Argentina	Belgium

GK	7	Ubaldo Fillol
SW	15	Daniel Passarella (c)
DF	14	Jorge Olguín
DF	8	Luis Galván
DF	18	Alberto Tarantini
MF	1	Osvaldo Ardiles
MF	9	Américo Gallego
MF	10	Diego Maradona
MF	11	Mario Kempes
FW	6	Ramón Díaz		(substituted off) 63'
FW	4	Daniel Bertoni	(yellow card) 55'
Substitutes:
GK	2	Héctor Baley
MF	3	Juan Barbas
MF	12	Patricio Hernández
FW	20	Jorge Valdano		(substituted on) 63'
DF	22	José Van Tuyne
Manager:
César Luis Menotti

GK	1	Jean-Marie Pfaff
SW	15	Maurits De Schrijver
DF	2	Eric Gerets (c)
DF	3	Luc Millecamps	(yellow card) 50'
DF	14	Marc Baecke
MF	10	Ludo Coeck
MF	6	Franky Vercauteren
MF	20	Guy Vandersmissen
FW	21	Alexandre Czerniatynski
FW	9	Erwin Vandenbergh
FW	11	Jan Ceulemans
Substitutes:
GK	12	Theo Custers
DF	5	Michel Renquin
MF	8	Wilfried Van Moer
DF	13	François Van der Elst
MF	17	René Verheyen
Manager:
Guy Thys

Assistant referees:
Károly Palotai (Hungary)
Alojzy Jarguz (Poland)

=== Hungary vs El Salvador ===
15 June 1982
21:00 CEST

Hungary	10–1	El Salvador
Nyilasi 4', 83'; Pölöskei 11'; Fazekas 23', 54'; Tóth 50'; L. Kiss 69', 72', 76'; Szentes 70'		Ramírez 64'

Nuevo Estadio, Elche
Attendance: 23,000
Referee: Ibrahim Youssef Al-Doy (Bahrain)

Hungary	El Salvador

GK	1	Ferenc Mészáros
DF	2	Győző Martos
DF	3	László Bálint
DF	4	József Tóth
DF	6	Imre Garaba
MF	5	Sándor Müller		(substituted off) 68'
MF	8	Tibor Nyilasi (c)	(yellow card) 74'
MF	14	Sándor Sallai
FW	7	László Fazekas	(yellow card) 74' (Note: Fazekas was shown a yellow card in the 74th minute, but the FIFA report mistakenly lists this as the 32nd minute.)
FW	9	András Törőcsik		(substituted off) 56'
FW	11	Gábor Pölöskei
Substitutes:
FW	10	László Kiss		(substituted on) 56'
MF	12	Lázár Szentes		(substituted on) 68'
MF	17	Károly Csapó
DF	19	József Varga
GK	21	Béla Katzirz
Manager:
Kálmán Mészöly

GK	1	Luis Guevara Mora
DF	2	Mario Castillo
DF	3	Francisco Jovel
DF	4	Carlos Recinos
DF	15	Jaime Rodríguez
MF	6	Joaquín Ventura	(substituted off) 79'
MF	8	José Luis Rugamas	(substituted off) 26'
MF	10	Norberto Huezo (c)
MF	13	José María Rivas
FW	9	Ever Hernández
FW	11	Mágico González
Substitutes:
DF	5	Ramón Fagoaga	(substituted on) 79'
DF	12	Francisco Osorto
FW	14	Luis Ramírez	(substituted on) 26'
MF	16	Mauricio Alfaro
GK	19	Eduardo Hernández
Manager:
Pipo Rodríguez

Assistant referees:
Charles Corver (Netherlands)
Henning Lund-Sørensen (Denmark)

=== Argentina vs Hungary ===
Following an officiating error, Hungary took the kick-off in both halves.

18 June 1982
21:00 CEST

Argentina	4–1	Hungary
Bertoni 26'; Maradona 28', 57'; Ardiles 60'		Pölöskei 76'

Estadio José Rico Pérez, Alicante
Attendance: 32,093
Referee: Belaïd Lacarne (Algeria)

Argentina	Hungary

GK	7	Ubaldo Fillol
SW	15	Daniel Passarella (c)
DF	14	Jorge Olguín
DF	8	Luis Galván
DF	18	Alberto Tarantini	(substituted off) 51'
MF	9	Américo Gallego
MF	1	Osvaldo Ardiles
MF	10	Diego Maradona
MF	11	Mario Kempes
FW	20	Jorge Valdano	(substituted off) 24'
FW	4	Daniel Bertoni
Substitutes:
GK	2	Héctor Baley
MF	3	Juan Barbas	(substituted on) 51'
MF	5	Gabriel Calderón	(substituted on) 24'
FW	6	Ramón Díaz
DF	22	José Van Tuyne
Manager:
César Luis Menotti

GK	1	Ferenc Mészáros
SW	3	László Bálint
DF	2	Győző Martos	(substituted off) 46'
DF	6	Imre Garaba
DF	4	József Tóth
MF	19	József Varga
MF	8	Tibor Nyilasi (c)
MF	14	Sándor Sallai
FW	10	László Kiss	(substituted off) 61'
FW	11	Gábor Pölöskei
FW	13	Tibor Rab
Substitutions:
GK	21	Béla Katzirz
FW	7	László Fazekas	(substituted on) 46'
FW	9	András Törőcsik
MF	12	Lázár Szentes	(substituted on) 61'
MF	18	Attila Kerekes
Manager:
Kálmán Mészöly

Assistant referees:
Michel Vautrot (France)
Nicolae Rainea (Romania)

=== Belgium vs El Salvador ===
19 June 1982
21:00 CEST

Belgium	1–0	El Salvador
Coeck 19'

Nuevo Estadio, Elche
Attendance: 15,000
Referee: Malcolm Moffat (Northern Ireland)

Belgium	El Salvador

GK	1	Jean-Marie Pfaff
DF	2	Eric Gerets (c)
DF	4	Walter Meeuws
DF	3	Luc Millecamps
DF	14	Marc Baecke
MF	20	Guy Vandersmissen	(substituted off) 46'
MF	10	Ludo Coeck
MF	6	Franky Vercauteren
FW	21	Alexandre Czerniatynski
FW	9	Erwin Vandenbergh
FW	11	Jan Ceulemans	(substituted off) 80'
Substitutes:
GK	22	Jacky Munaron
MF	8	Wilfried Van Moer	(substituted on) 80'
DF	13	François Van der Elst	(substituted on) 46'
DF	15	Maurits De Schrijver
MF	17	René Verheyen
Manager:
Guy Thys

GK	1	Luis Guevara Mora
DF	12	Francisco Osorto	(yellow card) 17'	(substituted off) 46'
DF	3	José Francisco Jovel
DF	15	Jaime Rodríguez
DF	4	Carlos Recinos
MF	5	Ramón Fagoaga	(yellow card) 74'
MF	6	Joaquín Ventura
MF	10	Norberto Huezo (c)
MF	14	Luis Ramírez Zapata
FW	11	Jorge González
FW	13	José María Rivas
Substitutions:
GK	19	Eduardo Hernández
DF	2	Mario Castillo
FW	9	Ever Hernández
MF	16	Mauricio Alfaro
DF	18	Miguel Ángel Díaz		(substituted on) 46'
Manager:
Pipo Rodríguez

Assistant referees:
Gastón Castro (Chile)
Alojzy Jarguz (Poland)

=== Belgium vs Hungary ===
22 June 1982
21:00 CEST

Belgium	1–1	Hungary
Czerniatynski 76'		Varga 27'

Nuevo Estadio, Elche
Attendance: 37,000
Referee: Clive White (England)

Belgium	Hungary

GK	1	Jean-Marie Pfaff	(yellow card) 65'
DF	2	Eric Gerets (c)		(substituted off) 62'
DF	4	Walter Meeuws	(yellow card) 79'
DF	3	Luc Millecamps
DF	14	Marc Baecke
MF	20	Guy Vandersmissen		(substituted off) 46'
MF	6	Franky Vercauteren
MF	10	Ludo Coeck
FW	11	Jan Ceulemans
FW	9	Erwin Vandenbergh
FW	21	Alexandre Czerniatynski
Substitutes:
GK	12	Theo Custers
MF	8	Wilfried Van Moer		(substituted on) 46'
DF	13	François Van der Elst
DF	16	Gerard Plessers		(substituted on) 62'
MF	17	René Verheyen
Manager:
Guy Thys

GK	1	Ferenc Mészáros
DF	2	Győző Martos
DF	18	Attila Kerekes
DF	6	Imre Garaba
DF	19	József Varga
MF	5	Sándor Müller	(substituted off) 67'
MF	8	Tibor Nyilasi (c)
FW	9	András Törőcsik
FW	7	László Fazekas
FW	10	László Kiss	(substituted off) 70'
FW	11	Gábor Pölöskei
Substitutions:
GK	21	Béla Katzirz
MF	12	Lázár Szentes
DF	13	Tibor Rab
DF	14	Sándor Sallai	(substituted on) 67'
MF	16	Ferenc Csongrádi	(substituted on) 70'
Manager:
Kálmán Mészöly

Assistant referees:
Walter Eschweiler (West Germany)
Belaïd Lacarne (Algeria)

=== Argentina vs El Salvador ===
23 June 1982
21:00 CEST

Argentina	2–0	El Salvador
Passarella 22' (pen.); Bertoni 54'

Estadio José Rico Pérez, Alicante
Attendance: 32,500
Referee: Luis Barrancos (Bolivia)

Argentina	El Salvador

GK	7	Ubaldo Fillol
DF	14	Jorge Olguín	(yellow card) 31'
DF	15	Daniel Passarella (c)
DF	8	Luis Galván
DF	18	Alberto Tarantini
MF	1	Osvaldo Ardiles
MF	9	Américo Gallego	(yellow card) 44'
MF	10	Diego Maradona
MF	11	Mario Kempes
FW	4	Daniel Bertoni		(substituted off) 67'
FW	5	Gabriel Calderón		(substituted off) 78'
Substitutes:
GK	2	Héctor Baley
FW	6	Ramón Díaz		(substituted on) 67'
MF	12	Patricio Hernández
DF	13	Julio Olarticoechea
FW	17	Santiago Santamaría		(substituted on) 78'
Manager:
César Luis Menotti

GK	1	Luis Guevara Mora
DF	12	Francisco Osorto	(yellow card) 20'	(substituted off) 33'
DF	3	José Francisco Jovel
DF	15	Jaime Rodríguez
DF	4	Carlos Recinos	(yellow card) 45'
MF	8	José Luis Rugamas
MF	6	Joaquín Ventura		(substituted off) 78'
MF	10	Norberto Huezo (c)
MF	14	Luis Ramírez Zapata	(yellow card) 26'
FW	11	Jorge González
FW	13	José María Rivas
Substitutions:
GK	19	Eduardo Hernández
DF	2	Mario Castillo
FW	9	Ever Hernández
MF	16	Mauricio Alfaro		(substituted on) 78'
DF	18	Miguel Ángel Díaz		(substituted on) 33'
Manager:
Pipo Rodríguez

Assistant referees:
Augusto Lamo Castillo (Spain)
Belaïd Lacarne (Algeria)

== See also ==
- Argentina at the FIFA World Cup
- Belgium at the FIFA World Cup
- El Salvador at the FIFA World Cup
- Hungary at the FIFA World Cup
