= Hungary v El Salvador (1982 FIFA World Cup) =

International association football match

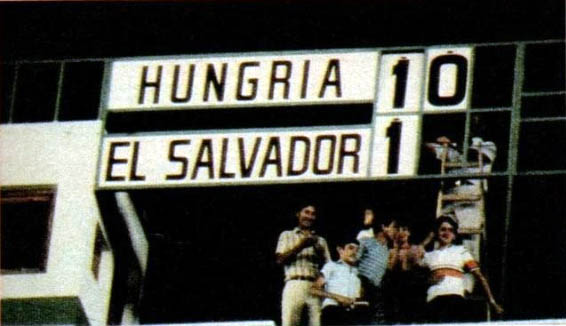
- The scoreboard at the end of the match
- Event: 1982 FIFA World Cup Group 3
Hungary	El Salvador
(Hungarian People's Republic)	(El Salvador)
10	1
- Date: 15 June 1982
- Venue: Nuevo Estadio, Elche
- Referee: Ibrahim Youssef Al-Doy (Bahrain)
- Attendance: 23,000

On 15 June 1982, Hungary defeated El Salvador by a score of 10–1 at the 1982 FIFA World Cup. The match, held at the Nuevo Estadio in Elche, Spain, is the largest margin of victory to ever occur at a FIFA World Cup tournament (Note: Hungary's victory over El Salvador was a +9 margin. This margin of victory equaled Hungary's 9–0 victory over South Korea in 1954 and Yugoslavia's 9–0 victory over Zaire in 1974.) and the only time that a team scored more than nine goals in a single game at the final tournament.

During the match, Hungarian forward László Kiss became the only substitute in FIFA World Cup history to score a hat-trick, doing so in seven minutes in the second half. El Salvador's lone goal, scored by Luis Ramírez, remains the only goal ever by El Salvador at a FIFA World Cup. El Salvador lost its remaining two games against Belgium and Argentina. Despite Hungary's record-setting victory, the team failed to advance to the second round.

== Background ==
On 16 January 1982, the draw for the 1982 FIFA World Cup determined that Group 3 would be composed of Argentina, Belgium, Hungary and El Salvador. The group's matches were to be held in Alicante and Elche in southeastern Spain.

=== Hungary ===
Hungary was one of fourteen UEFA teams to qualify for the 1982 FIFA World Cup. This was the eighth time that Hungary had qualified for the FIFA World Cup, and the team previously finished as runners-up in the 1938 and 1954 editions. At the 1954 FIFA World Cup, Hungary set a FIFA World Cup record +9 margin of victory when it defeated South Korea by a score of 9–0. Yugoslavia equaled this margin with a 9–0 victory of their own against Zaire in 1974, but no team has ever scored a higher margin.

=== El Salvador ===
El Salvador was one of two CONCACAF teams to qualify, the other being Honduras. This was El Salvador's second appearance at the FIFA World Cup after its debut at the 1970 edition where it lost all three of its group stage matches and did not score a single goal. El Salvador's squad was the youngest at the 1982 FIFA World Cup and did not have much experience. Furthermore, the squad only had 20 players instead of the allowed 22 as the Salvadoran government filled those spots with government officials. According to goalkeeper Luis Guevara Mora, the two officials wanted to go on vacation in Europe and did not attend any of El Salvador's matches. The president of the Salvadoran Football Federation also reportedly remarked that "a 20-man squad was more than enough". The squad's players attempted to raise money to bring the two players left behind (Miguel González and Gilberto Quinteros) to the tournament but were unsuccessful. El Salvador was the last team to arrive in Spain, only three days before its match against Hungary. El Salvador was coached by Mauricio Rodríguez who was a player at the 1970 FIFA World Cup.

At the time of El Salvador's qualification, the country was in the early years of a civil war between the government and leftist rebels. The civil war left the national team unable to schedule many friendly matches prior to the 1982 FIFA World Cup and practice sessions were frequently disrupted by fighting. According to defender Francisco Jovel, national team players assisted victims of the civil war causing them to be late to practice. Midfielder Mauricio Alfaro stated that the national team "made the killings from both factions cease" whenever it played a match. Contemporary rumors claimed that certain players sympathized with the government while others favored the rebels, but according to FourFourTwo writer Martin Mazur, "politics didn't matter in the dressing room".

== Venue ==
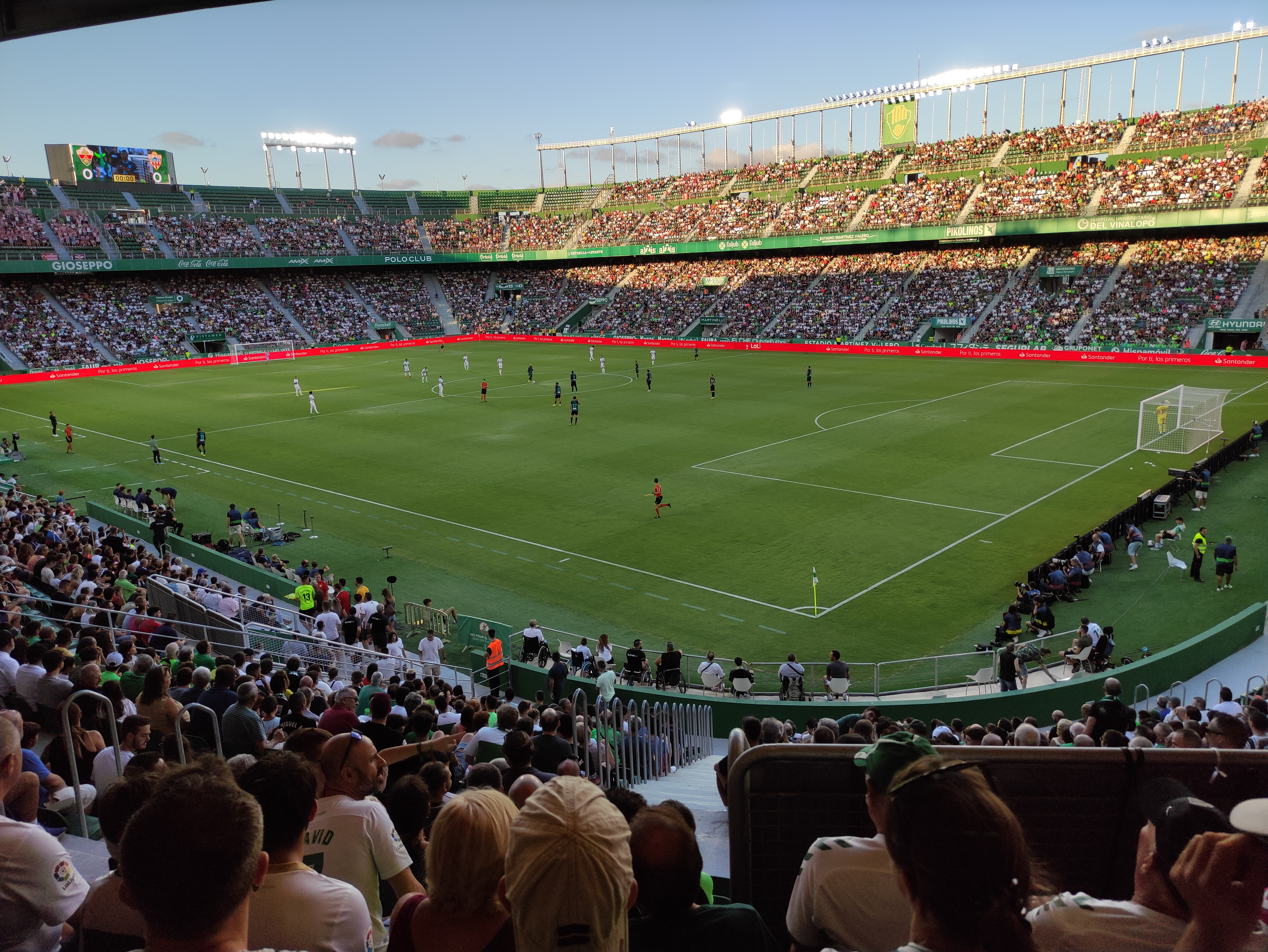
The Nuevo Estadio hosted the match

The match was held in Estadio Martínez Valero (then named Nuevo Estadio), located in the Spanish city of Elche in the province of Alicante. home stadium of Elche CF. Its name pays tribute to the late president of the club, Manuel Martínez Valero.

The venue was inaugurated in 1976, replacing the former Campo de Altabix, which had been built in 1923. Architect Juan Boix Matarredona designed the stadium, the largest sports arena in the province of Alicante. With a capacity of 31,388 seats, Martínez Valero is the 15th-largest stadium in Spain and the 2nd-largest in the Valencian community.

== Match ==
The match between Hungary and El Salvador began at 21:00 CEST. Around 23,000 people were in attendance. The match was the fifth of the 1982 FIFA World Cup and the second of Group 3 after Argentina v Belgium, in which Belgium defeated Argentina by a score of 1–0. According to a survey conducted by a Salvadoran radio station before the match, around 60 percent of Salvadorans believed that El Salvador would defeat Hungary.

=== Summary ===
==== First half ====
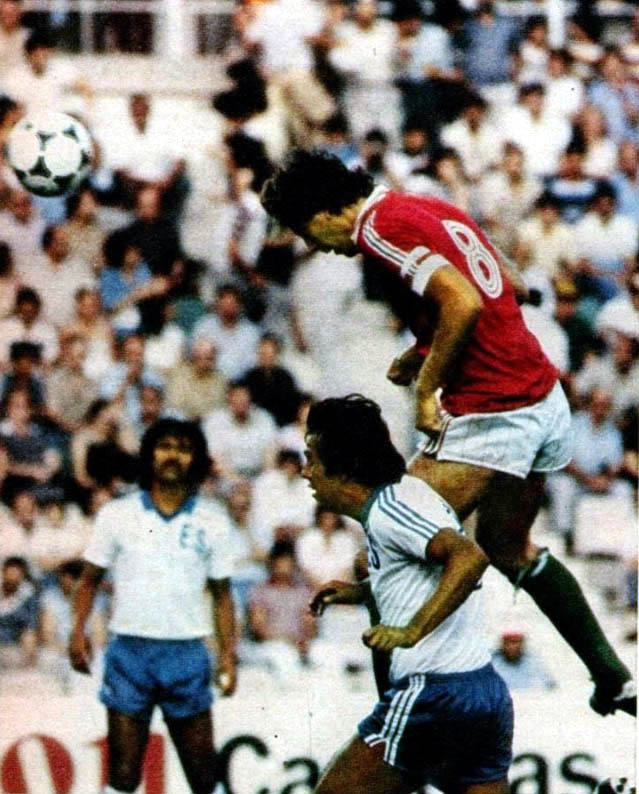
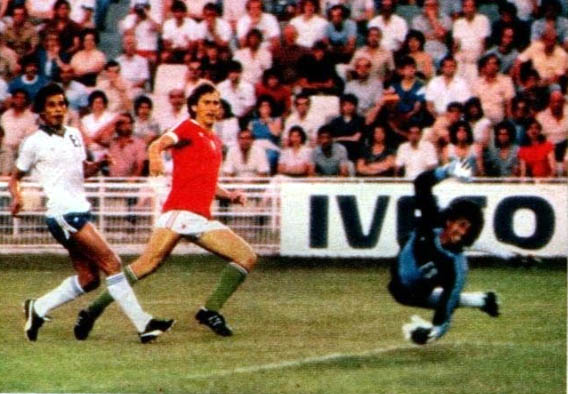
The 1st and 2nd goals of Hungary, scored by Nyilasi and Pölöskei respectively

Rodríguez's strategy was to quickly attack Hungary; The Guardian contributor Paul Doyle described El Salvador's tactical scheme as being "monumentally ill-conceived". Only four minutes after the match began, Hungarian captain Tibor Nyilasi scored. This was followed by an 11th minute goal by Gábor Pölöskei and a 23rd minute goal by László Fazekas. Rodríguez made El Salvador's first substitution in the 27th minute, replacing midfielder José Luis Rugamas with forward Luis Ramírez believing that the change could lead to a comeback. While Ramírez and Jorge González forced Hungarian goalkeeper Ferenc Mészáros to save a few shots, El Salvador failed to score in the first half that ended with a score of 3–0. During the halftime break, Hungarian manager Kálmán Mészöly criticized the Hungarian players for "complacency".

==== Second half ====
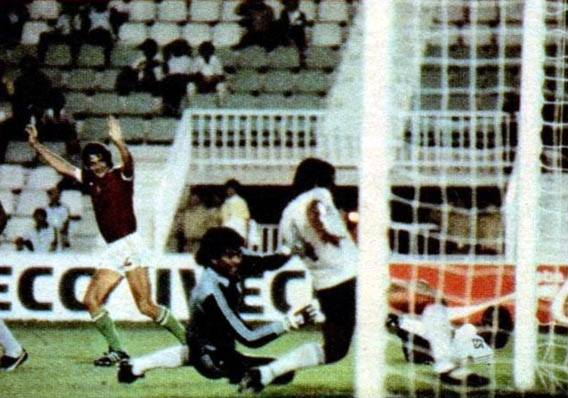
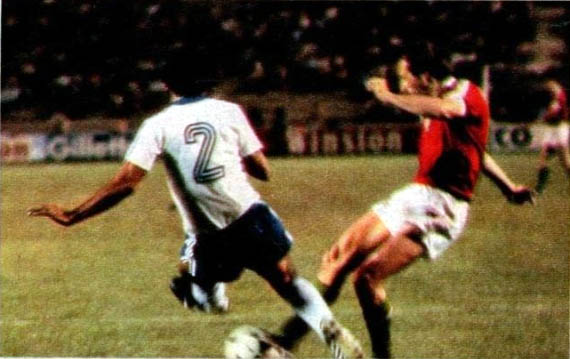
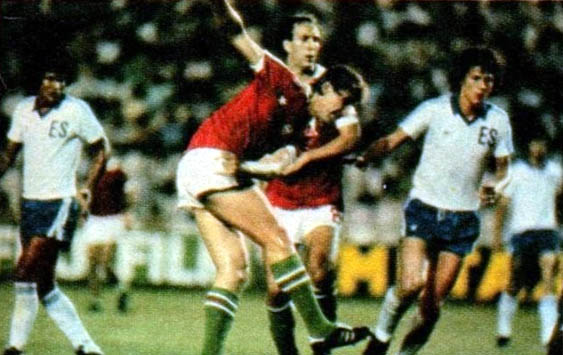
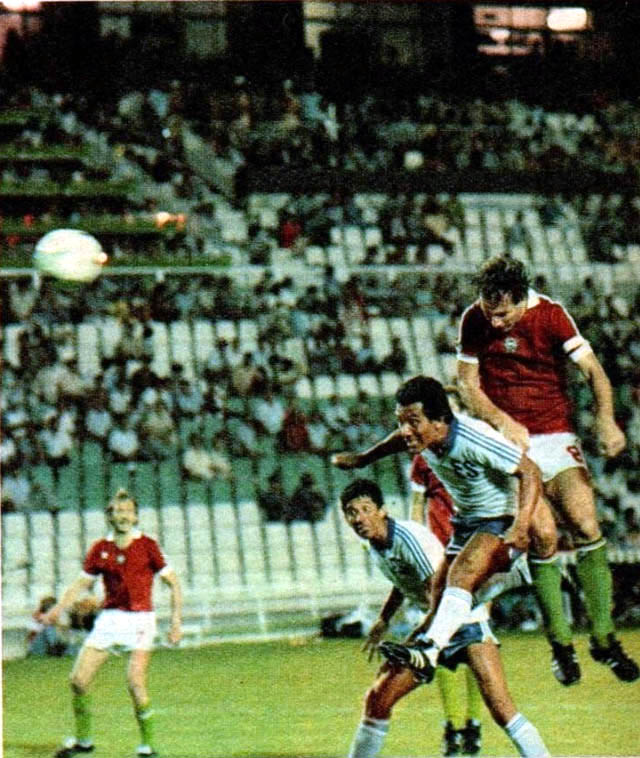
In the 2nd half, Hungary scored seven goals; forward László Kiss (third image) became the only substitute to score a hat-trick at a FIFA World Cup

Hungarian defender József Tóth scored the side's fourth goal in the 50th minute. Rodríguez told substitute goalkeeper Eduardo Hernández to be ready to replace Mora, but Hernández refused due to how the match was unfolding. Fazekas scored his second goal in the 54th minute. During that stoppage, Hungarian forward András Törőcsik was substituted for László Kiss.

Ramírez scored El Salvador's lone goal in the 64th minute, cutting El Salvador's deficit to 5–1. He and some of his teammates celebrated the goal, but he later reported after the game that some other teammates told him to not celebrate as they feared that he could "make Hungary angry" and lead to El Salvador "conced[ing] more goals".

Five minutes after Ramírez's goal, Kiss scored, and the next minute, Lázár Szentes scored. Kiss then scored two more goals in the 72nd and 76th minutes to complete a hat-trick. Kiss' hat-trick was the quickest hat-trick in FIFA World Cup history, occurring in the span of seven minutes, and the only hat-trick in the tournament's history to have been scored by a substitute.

Nyilasi scored Hungary's tenth goal in the 83rd minute. The match ended with a score of 10–1. It was the first and so far only time in FIFA World Cup history that a team scored a double-digit number of goals, and its +9 goal margin equalled the tournament's largest margin of victory.

=== Details ===
15 June 1982
21:00 CEST

Hungary	10–1	El Salvador
Nyilasi 4', 83'; Pölöskei 11'; Fazekas 23', 54'; Tóth 50'; L. Kiss 69', 72', 76'; Szentes 70'		Ramírez 64'

Nuevo Estadio, Elche
Attendance: 23,000
Referee: Ibrahim Youssef Al-Doy (Bahrain)

Hungary	El Salvador

GK	1	Ferenc Mészáros
DF	2	Győző Martos
DF	3	László Bálint
DF	4	József Tóth
DF	6	Imre Garaba
MF	5	Sándor Müller		(substituted off) 68'
MF	8	Tibor Nyilasi (c)	(yellow card) 74'
MF	14	Sándor Sallai
FW	7	László Fazekas	(yellow card) 74' (Note: Fazekas was shown a yellow card in the 74th minute, but the FIFA report mistakenly lists this as the 32nd minute.)
FW	9	András Törőcsik		(substituted off) 56'
FW	11	Gábor Pölöskei
Substitutes:
GK	21	Béla Katzirz
FW	10	László Kiss		(substituted on) 56'
MF	12	Lázár Szentes		(substituted on) 68'
MF	17	Károly Csapó
DF	19	József Varga
Manager:
Kálmán Mészöly

GK	1	Luis Guevara Mora
DF	2	Mario Castillo
DF	3	Francisco Jovel
DF	4	Carlos Recinos
DF	15	Jaime Rodríguez
MF	6	Joaquín Ventura	(substituted off) 79'
MF	8	José Luis Rugamas	(substituted off) 26'
MF	10	Norberto Huezo (c)
MF	13	José María Rivas
FW	9	Ever Hernández
FW	11	Mágico González
Substitutes:
GK	19	Eduardo Hernández
DF	5	Ramón Fagoaga	(substituted on) 79'
DF	12	Francisco Osorto
FW	14	Luis Ramírez	(substituted on) 26'
MF	16	Mauricio Alfaro
Manager:
Pipo Rodríguez

Assistant referees:
Charles Corver (Netherlands)
Henning Lund-Sørensen (Denmark)

== Post-match ==
After the match, Nyilasi remarked that the match was "impossible to repeat. Had we played it 100 times, we would never have racked up 10." Regarding the El Salvador team, he said that "they weren't as bad a team as the result suggests. The problem was that they just tried to go forward rather naïvely." Kiss remarked that "it was a terrible accident for them, but an accident that will remain forever. The poor sods probably thought they could beat us, and attacked us gung-ho — what a terrible mistake." Mészöly stated that "we started the match very well and then we just overwhelmed them" ("nagyon jól kezdtük a mérkőzést, aztán pedig egyszerűen felőröltük őket"). Author Clemente Angelo Lisi described Hungarians as turning the match into a "scrimmage" and using El Salvador as a "sparring partner".

"When we qualified, we were heroes and useful, then after we lost we were a disgrace and disposable. In every conversation, the 10–1 reared its head."

— Francisco Jovel

Due to El Salvador's poor performance, Rodríguez was "effectively overthrown" as manager by players Ramón Fagoaga, Norberto Huezo (the captain), and Jovel who announced that they would take over determining tactics for El Salvador's remaining matches against Belgium and Argentina. The El Salvador squad played an unofficial match against their hotel's waiters to rebuild their confidence. Ahead of Belgium's match against El Salvador, Belgian manager Guy Thys described El Salvador's performance as "the most shameful" in FIFA World Cup history. Belgium went on to defeat El Salvador by a score of 1–0. El Salvador lost its last match against Argentina by a score of 2–0. Some Salvadorans at the time claimed that Argentine forward Diego Maradona remarked that he could score 10 goals against El Salvador by himself.

Hungary lost its next match against Argentina by a score of 4–1. Hungary drew its last match against Belgium, ending 1–1. Despite Hungary's record victory against El Salvador, the team failed to advance to the second group stage. Hungary finished with a goal differential of +6, but it only finished with 3 points while Belgium and Argentina had 5 and 4 points, respectively.

== Legacy ==
Upon returning to El Salvador, many players were harassed and threatened with violence. On 15 June 2007, the Salvadoran Football Federation organized a friendly match against Hungary to commemorate the 25th anniversary of the 10–1 match, and several of the players from the game took part in the anniversary match in San Salvador. Ramírez, who scored El Salvador's lone goal in 1982, scored twice in the anniversary match that ended in a 2–2 draw. After the rematch, Jorge González remarked that "we finally made it up to our supporters".

"Sooner or later somebody will break [my] records, but while they still belong to me, they obviously feel nice."

— László Kiss

Kiss remains the only substitute to ever score a hat-trick at the FIFA World Cup. He was close to a fourth goal had one of his shots not been voided for being offside. Meanwhile, Ramírez's goal against Hungary in 1982 is the only goal that El Salvador has ever scored at the FIFA World Cup. He once remarked that "everybody remembers the number 10 but nobody remembers my goal". As of the 2026 FIFA World Cup, 1982 was the last time that El Salvador qualified for the FIFA World Cup. Hungary qualified for the 1986 FIFA World Cup, but it has not qualified again since.

The match between Hungary and El Salvador set the FIFA World Cup records for most goals scored by a single team (10 by Hungary) and tied the record for the largest margin of victory (+9 by Hungary). It also had the second most number of goals scored at 11, only behind Austria and Switzerland's 1954 match that ended with 12 goals. In 2022, Fox Sports ranked Hungary's 10–1 victory over El Salvador as the 83rd most memorable moment in FIFA World Cup history while FIFA ranked the match as the 41st greatest moment in FIFA World Cup history.

== See also ==
- El Salvador at the FIFA World Cup
- Hungary at the FIFA World Cup
