= Hungary national football team results (1970–1989) =

This article provides details of international football games played by the Hungary national football team from 1970 to 1989.

== Results ==
Key
Win
Draw
Defeat

=== 1970 ===
12 April 1970 Friendly	Yugoslavia	2–2	Hungary	Belgrade, Yugoslavia
15:00	Páncsics 33' (o.g.); Gračanin 48'	Report	Fazekas 19'; Bene 75'	Stadium: JNA Stadium; Attendance: 5,865; Referee: Ferdinand Marschall (Austria)

2 May 1970 Friendly	Hungary	2–0	Poland	Budapest, Hungary
14:00	Fazekas 57'; Karsai 80'	Report		Stadium: Népstadion; Attendance: 9,054; Referee: Wolfgang Riedel (East Germany)

16 May 1970 Friendly	Hungary	1–2	Sweden	Budapest, Hungary
18:00	Fazekas 19'	Report	Persson 59'; Ejderstedt 89'	Stadium: Népstadion; Attendance: 25,678; Referee: Erich Linemayr (Austria)

9 September 1970 Friendly	West Germany	3–1	Hungary	Nuremberg, West Germany
19:30	Sieloff 11'; G. Müller 22', 53'	Report	Fazekas 32'	Stadium: Städtisches Stadion; Attendance: 54,140; Referee: Ferdinand Marschall (Austria)

27 September 1970 Friendly	Hungary	1–1	Austria	Budapest, Hungary
15:30	Vidáts 13'	Report	Redl 29'	Stadium: Népstadion; Attendance: 15,000; Referee: Ratko Čanak (Yugoslavia)

7 October 1970 UEFA Euro 1972 qualifying	Norway	1–3	Hungary	Oslo, Norway
19:00	Iversen 50'	Report	Bene 6'; Nagy 23'; Karlsen 69' (o.g.)	Stadium: Ullevaal; Attendance: 16,090; Referee: Adrianus Boogaerts (Netherlands)

15 November 1970 Friendly	Switzerland	0–1	Hungary	Basel, Switzerland
15:00	Fazekas 82'	Report		Stadium: St. Jakob Stadium; Attendance: 25,000; Referee: Concetto Lo Bello (Italy)

=== 1971 ===
4 April 1971 Friendly	Austria	0–2	Hungary	Austria

24 April 1971 UEFA Euro 1972 qualifying	Hungary	1–1	France	Népstadion, Budapest
16:30	Kocsis 70' (pen.)	Report	Revelli 64'	Attendance: 45,867; Referee: Joaquim Fernandes dos Campos (Portugal)

19 May 1971 UEFA Euro 1972 qualifying	Bulgaria	3–0	Hungary	Vasil Levski Stadium, Sofia
18:30	Kolev 38'; Petkov 48'; Velichkov 72'	Report		Attendance: 28,342; Referee: Tofik Bakhramov (USSR)

21 July 1971 Friendly	Brazil	0–0	Hungary	Brazil

1 September 1971 Friendly	Hungary	2–1	Yugoslavia	Budapest, Hungary
	Holcer 64' (o.g.); Szőke 82'	Report	Oklak 13'	Stadium: Népstadion; Attendance: 36,000; Referee: Erich Linamayr (Austria)

25 September 1971 UEFA Euro 1972 qualifying	Hungary	2–0	Bulgaria	Népstadion, Budapest
17:30	Juhász 51'; Vidáts 52'	Report		Attendance: 67,740; Referee: Robert Holley Davidson (Scotland)

9 October 1971 UEFA Euro 1972 qualifying	France	0–2	Hungary	Stade Olympique, Colombes(Paris)
15:00		Report	Bene 35'; Novi 43' (o.g.)	Attendance: 21,756; Referee: Gaspar Pintado Viu (Spain)

27 October 1971 UEFA Euro 1972 qualifying	Hungary	4–0	Norway	Népstadion, Budapest
17:30	Bene 22', 43'; Dunai 24'; Szűcs 63'	Report		Attendance: 29,253; Referee: Doğan Babacan (Turkey)

14 November 1971 1974 FIFA World Cup qualification	Malta	0–2	Hungary	Valletta, Malta
		Report	Bene 3', 56'	Referee: Lo Bello (Italy)

=== 1972 ===
12 January 1972 Friendly	Spain	1–0	Hungary	Spain

29 March 1972 Friendly	Hungary	0–2	West Germany	Hungary

=== 1973 ===
26 September 1973 Friendly	Yugoslavia	1–1	Hungary	Belgrade, Yugoslavia
	Bjeković 17'	Report	Bene 47'	Stadium: JNA Stadium; Attendance: 30,000; Referee: Sergio Gonella (Italy)

13 October 1973 Friendly	Denmark	2–2	Hungary	Denmark

21 November 1973 Friendly	Hungary	0–1	East Germany	Hungary

=== 1974 ===
31 March 1974 Friendly	Hungary	3–1	Bulgaria	Hungary

17 April 1974 Friendly	West Germany	5–0	Hungary	West Germany

29 May 1974 Friendly	Hungary	3–2	Yugoslavia	Székesfehérvár, Hungary
	Máté 54', 85'; Fazekas 65' (pen.)	Report	Popivoda 17'; Jerković 21'	Stadium: Sóstói Stadion; Attendance: 16,000; Referee: Heinz Aldinger (Germany)

28 September 1974 Friendly	Austria	1–0	Hungary	Austria

10 November 1974 Friendly	Bulgaria	0–0	Hungary	Bulgaria

4 December 1974 Friendly	Hungary	1–0	Switzerland	Hungary

=== 1975 ===
26 March 1975 Friendly	France	2–0	Hungary	France

10 August 1975 Friendly	Iran	1–2	Hungary	Iran

8 October 1975 Friendly	Poland	4–2	Hungary	Poland

15 October 1975 Friendly	Czechoslovakia	1–1	Hungary	Czechoslovakia

=== 1976 ===
3 February 1976 Friendly	Mexico	4–1	Hungary	Mexico

9 February 1976 Friendly	El Salvador	1–2	Hungary	El Salvador

27 March 1976 Friendly	Hungary	2–0	Argentina	Hungary

17 April 1976 Friendly	Yugoslavia	0–0	Hungary	Yugoslavia

30 April 1976 Friendly	Switzerland	0–1	Hungary	Switzerland

22 May 1976 Friendly	Hungary	1–0	France	Hungary

26 May 1976 Friendly	Hungary	1–1	Soviet Union	Hungary

12 June 1976 Friendly	Hungary	2–0	Austria	Hungary

8 September 1976 Friendly	Sweden	1–1	Hungary	Sweden

22 September 1976 Friendly	East Germany	1–1	Hungary	East Germany

13 October 1976 Friendly	Austria	2–4	Hungary	Austria

=== 1977 ===
9 February 1977 Friendly	Peru	3–2	Hungary	Peru

22 February 1977 Friendly	Mexico	1–1	Hungary	Mexico

27 February 1977 Friendly	Argentina	5–1	Hungary	Argentina

15 March 1977 Friendly	Iran	0–2	Hungary	Iran

27 March 1977 Friendly	Spain	1–1	Hungary	Spain

13 April 1977 Friendly	Hungary	2–1	Poland	Hungary

20 April 1977 Friendly	Hungary	2–0	Czechoslovakia	Hungary

1 October 1977 Friendly	Iran	3–1	Hungary	Iran

5 October 1977 Friendly	Hungary	4–3	Yugoslavia	Hungary

12 October 1977 Friendly	Hungary	3–0	Sweden	Hungary

=== 1978 ===
15 April 1978 Friendly	Hungary	2–1	Czechoslovakia	Hungary

16 May 1978 Friendly	Hungary	2–2	Tunisia	France

24 May 1978 Friendly	England	4–1	Hungary	England

15 November 1978 Friendly	West Germany	0–0	Hungary	West Germany

=== 1979 ===
28 March 1979 Friendly	Hungary	3–0	East Germany	Hungary

4 April 1979 Friendly	Poland	1–1	Hungary	Poland

12 September 1979 Friendly	Hungary	2–1	Czechoslovakia	Hungary

26 September 1979 Friendly	Austria	3–1	Hungary	Austria

26 October 1979 Friendly	Hungary	0–2	United States	Hungary

=== 1980 ===
26 March 1980 Friendly	Hungary	2–1	Poland	Hungary

30 April 1980 Friendly	Czechoslovakia	1–0	Hungary	Czechoslovakia

31 May 1980 Friendly	Hungary	3–1	Scotland	Hungary

4 June 1980 Friendly	Hungary	1–1	Austria	Hungary

20 August 1980 Friendly	Hungary	2–0	Sweden	Hungary

27 August 1980 Friendly	Hungary	1–4	Soviet Union	Hungary

24 September 1980 Friendly	Hungary	2–2	Spain	Népstadion, Budapest
	Kiss 10'; Béla 47'		3' Juanito; 68' Satrústegui	Attendance: 15,000; Referee: (Czechoslovakia) Jozef Marko

8 October 1980 Friendly	Austria	3–1	Hungary	Austria

19 November 1980 Friendly	East Germany	2–0	Hungary	East Germany

=== 1981 ===
15 April 1981 Friendly	Spain	0–3	Hungary	Luis Casanova, Valencia
			31' Kiss; 84' Béla; 90' Nyilasi	Attendance: 25,000; Referee: (France) Daniel Lambert

28 April 1981 1982 World Cup qualification	Switzerland	2–2	Hungary	Stadion Allmend, Lucerne
	Sulser 32', 47'	Report	Bálint 45'; S. Müller 65' (pen.)	Attendance: 17,000; Referee: Ian Foote (Scotland)

13 May 1981 1982 World Cup qualification	Hungary	1–0	Romania	Budapest, Hungary
	Fazekas 18'	Report		Stadium: Népstadion, Budapest; Attendance: 68,000; Referee: Alexis Ponnet (Belgium)

20 May 1981 1982 World Cup qualification	Norway	1–2	Hungary	Ullevaal Stadion, Oslo
	Thoresen 57'	Report	L. Kiss 78', 79'	Attendance: 28,000; Referee: Malcom Moffatt (Northern Ireland)

6 June 1981 1982 World Cup qualification	Hungary	1–3	England	Népstadion, Budapest
	Garaba 44'	Report	Brooking 19', 60'; Keegan 73' (pen.)	Attendance: 68,000; Referee: Paolo Casarin (Italy)

23 September 1981 1982 World Cup qualification	Romania	0–0	Hungary	Stadionul 23. August, Bucharest
		Report		Attendance: 70,000; Referee: Erich Linemayr (Austria)

14 October 1981 1982 World Cup qualification	Hungary	3–0	Switzerland	Népstadion, Budapest
	Nyilasi 23', 50'; Fazekas 59'	Report		Attendance: 75,000; Referee: Talat Tokat (Turkey)

31 October 1981 1982 World Cup qualification	Hungary	4–1	Norway	Népstadion, Budapest
	Bálint 12'; L. Kiss 60', 85'; Fazekas 79'	Report	Lund 35'	Attendance: 68,000; Referee: Egon Šoštarić (Yugoslavia)

18 November 1981 1982 World Cup qualification	England	1–0	Hungary	Wembley Stadium, London
	Mariner 16'	Report		Attendance: 92,000; Referee: Georges Konrath (France)

=== 1982 ===
11 February 1982 Friendly	New Zealand	1–2	Hungary	New Zealand

14 February 1982 Friendly	New Zealand	1–2	Hungary	New Zealand

24 March 1982 Friendly	Hungary	2–3	Austria	Hungary

18 April 1982 Friendly	Hungary	1–2	Peru	Hungary

15 June 1982 1982 World Cup	Hungary	10–1	El Salvador	Nuevo Estadio, Elche
21:00 CEST	Nyilasi 4', 83'; Pölöskei 11'; Fazekas 23', 54'; Tóth 50'; L. Kiss 69', 72', 76'; Szentes 70'	Report	Ramírez Zapata 64'	Attendance: 23,000; Referee: Ibrahim Youssef Al-Doy (Bahrain)

18 June 1982 1982 World Cup	Argentina	4–1	Hungary	Estadio José Rico Pérez, Alicante
21:00 CEST	Bertoni 26'; Maradona 28', 57'; Ardiles 60'	Report	Pölöskei 76'	Attendance: 32,093; Referee: Belaïd Lacarne (Algeria)

22 June 1982 1982 World Cup	Belgium	1–1	Hungary	Nuevo Estadio, Elche
21:00 CEST	Czerniatynski 76'	Report	Varga 27'	Attendance: 37,000; Referee: Clive White (England)

22 September 1982 Friendly	Hungary	5–0	Turkey	Rába ETO Stadion, Győr
	Chivadze 4'; Demyanenko 20'; Blokhin 26'; Shengelia 49'	(Report)		Attendance: 6,000; Referee: (Czechoslovakia) Josef Pouček

6 October 1982 Friendly	France	1–0	Hungary	Paris, France
	Roussey 65'	Match Report		Stadium: Parc des Princes; Attendance: 15,777; Referee: Roger Verhaeghe (Belgium)

12 December 1982 Friendly	Aruba	0–9	Hungary	Aruba

=== 1983 ===
21 January 1983 Friendly	Egypt	1–0	Hungary	Egypt

23 January 1983 Friendly	Egypt	0–2	Hungary	Egypt

27 March 1983 Euro 1984 qualifying	Luxembourg	2–6	Hungary	Stade Municipal, Luxembourg
	Reiter 4'; Schreiner 55'	(Details)	Póczik 30', 59', 69'; Nyilasi 40'; Pölöskei 50'; Hannich 56'	Attendance: 2,159; Referee: Gerard Geurds (Netherlands)

13 April 1983 Friendly	Portugal	0–0	Hungary	Estádio Municipal de Coimbra, Coimbra
				Attendance: 15,000; Referee: (France) Georges Konrath

17 April 1983 Euro 1984 qualifying	Hungary	6–2	Luxembourg	Népstadion, Budapest
	Hajszán 21'; Nyilasi 33', 63'; L. Kiss 35'; Szentes 61'; Burcsa 65'	(Details)	Reiter 56'; Malget 57'	Attendance: 12,278; Referee: Edgar Azzopardi (Malta)

27 April 1983 Euro 1984 qualifying	England	2–0	Hungary	Wembley Stadium, London
	Francis 31'; Withe 70'	(Details)		Attendance: 50,544; Referee: Pietro D'elia (Italy)

15 May 1983 Euro 1984 qualifying	Hungary	2–3	Greece	Népstadion, Budapest
	Nyilasi 24'; Hajszan 88'	(Details)	Anastopoulos 15'; Kostikos 32'; Papaioannou 56'	Attendance: 13,126; Referee: Edvard Sostaric (Yugoslavia)

1 June 1983 Euro 1984 qualifying	Denmark	3–1	Hungary	Idrætsparken, Copenhagen
	Elkjær 3'; J.Olsen 81'; Simonsen 85' (pen.)	(Details)	Nyilasi 29'	Attendance: 44,800; Referee: Heinz Fahnler (Austria)

7 September 1983 Friendly	Hungary	1–1	West Germany	Hungary

12 October 1983	Hungary	0–3	England	Népstadion, Budapest
		(Details)	Hoddle 13'; Lee 19'; Mariner 42'	Attendance: 19,956; Referee: Bruno Galler (Switzerland)

26 October 1983 Euro 1984 qualifying	Hungary	1–0	Denmark	Népstadion, Budapest
	S. Kiss 57'	(Details)		Attendance: 6,333; Referee: Emilio Guruceta Muro (Spain)

3 December 1983 Euro 1984 qualifying	Greece	2–2	Hungary	Kaftanzoglio Stadium, Thessaloniki
	Anastopoulos 9', 55'	(Details)	Kardos 12'; Bodonyi 40'	Attendance: 651; Referee: Ioan Igna (Romania)

=== 1984 ===
18 January 1984 Friendly	Spain	0–1	Hungary	Ramón de Carranza, Cádiz
			69' Garaba	Attendance: 25,000; Referee: (England) Joe Worrall

31 March 1984 Friendly	Yugoslavia	2–1	Hungary	Subotica, Yugoslavia
	Đurovski 66'; Radanović 80' (pen.)	Report	Gyimesi 86'	Stadium: Subotica City Stadium; Attendance: 25,000; Referee: Robert Matušík (Soviet Union)

4 April 1984 Friendly	Turkey	0–6	Hungary	İnönü Stadium, Istanbul
		(Report)	22', 51' Mészáros; 38' Kardos; 49', 68' Esterházy; 63' Bodonyi	Attendance: 50,000; Referee: (West Germany) Volker Roth

23 May 1984 Friendly	Norway	0–0	Hungary	Norway

31 May 1984 Friendly	Hungary	1–1	Spain	Üllői Úti, Budapest
	Nagy 48'		21' Rincón	Attendance: 10,000; Referee: (West Germany) Aron Schmidhuber

6 June 1984 Friendly	Belgium	2–2	Hungary	Brussels
	Ceulemans 17', 88'		Hajszán 43'; Nyilasi 59'	Stadium: Heysel Stadium; Attendance: 12,800; Referee: Georges Konrath (France)

22 August 1984 Friendly	Hungary	3–0	Switzerland	Hungary

25 August 1984 Friendly	Hungary	0–2	Mexico	Hungary

26 September 1984 1986 World Cup qualification	Hungary	3–1	Austria	Népstadion, Budapest
	Nagy 50'; Esterházy 61'; Kardos 77'	Report	Schachner 23'	Attendance: 25,417; Referee: Michel Vautrot (France)

17 October 1984 1986 World Cup qualification	Netherlands	1–2	Hungary	De Kuip, Rotterdam
	Kieft 19'	Report	Détári 24'; Esterházy 55'	Attendance: 52,148; Referee: André Daina (Switzerland)

17 November 1984 1986 World Cup qualification	Cyprus	1–2	Hungary	Tsirion Stadium, Limassol
	Foti 25'	Report	Róth 49'; Nyilasi 86'	Attendance: 4,650; Referee: Brian McGinlay (Scotland)

=== 1985 ===
29 January 1985 Friendly	West Germany	0–1	Hungary	West Germany

3 April 1985 1986 World Cup qualification	Hungary	2–0	Cyprus	Népstadion, Budapest
	Nyilasi 48'; Szokolai 83'	Report		Attendance: 24,843; Referee: Einar Halle (Norway)

17 April 1985 1986 World Cup qualification	Austria	0–3	Hungary	Gerhard-Hanappi-Stadion, Vienna
		Report	Kiprich 21', 33'; Détári 48'	Attendance: 17,869; Referee: Jakob Baumann (Switzerland)

14 May 1985 1986 World Cup qualification	Hungary	0–1	Netherlands	Népstadion, Budapest
		Report	De Wit 69'	Attendance: 71,647; Referee: Karl-Josef Assenmacher (West Germany)

16 October 1985 Friendly	Wales	0–3	Hungary	Wales

8 December 1986 1985 Mexico Tournament	South Korea	0–1	Hungary	Irapuato, Mexico
			Kiprich 54' (pen.)

11 December 1985 1985 Mexico Tournament	Hungary	3–1	Algeria	Irapuato, Mexico

14 December 1985 1985 Mexico Tournament	Mexico	2–0	Hungary	Irapuato, Mexico

=== 1986 ===
2 February 1986 Friendly	Qatar	0–3	Hungary	Qatar

16 March 1986 Friendly	Hungary	3–0	Brazil	Hungary

2 June 1986 1986 World Cup	Soviet Union	6–0	Hungary	Estadio Sergio León Chavez, Irapuato
12:00 CST	Yakovenko 2'; Aleinikov 4'; Belanov 24' (pen.); Yaremchuk 66'; Dajka 73' (o.g.); Rodionov 80'	Report		Attendance: 16,500; Referee: Luigi Agnolin (Italy)

6 June 1986 1986 World Cup	Hungary	2–0	Canada	Estadio Sergio León Chavez, Irapuato
12:00 CST	Esterházy 2'; Détári 75'	Report		Attendance: 13,800; Referee: Jamal Al Sharif (Syria)

9 June 1986 1986 World Cup	Hungary	0–3	France	Estadio Nou Camp, León
12:00 CST		Report	Stopyra 29'; Tigana 62'; Rocheteau 84'	Attendance: 31,420; Referee: Carlos Silva Valente (Portugal)

9 September 1986 Friendly	Norway	0–0	Hungary	Norway

=== 1987 ===
28 July 1987 Friendly	East Germany	0–0	Hungary	East Germany

9 September 1987 Friendly	Scotland	2–0	Hungary	Scotland

18 November 1987 Friendly	Hungary	0–0	West Germany	Hungary

=== 1988 ===
16 March 1988 Friendly	Hungary	1–0	Turkey	Népstadion, Budapest
	Kiprich 90'	(Report)		Attendance: 2,000; Referee: (Poland) Tadeusz Diakonowicz

26 March 1988 Friendly	Belgium	3–0	Hungary	Brussels
	Ceulemans 53' (pen.); Fitos 61' (o.g.); Severeyns 81'			Stadium: Heysel Stadium; Attendance: 8,500; Referee: Heinz Holzmann (Austria)

27 April 1988 Friendly	Hungary	0–0	England	Budapest, Hungary
		Report		Stadium: Népstadion; Attendance: 26,500; Referee: Karl-Heinz Tritschler (West Germany)

4 May 1988 Friendly	Hungary	3–0	Iceland	Hungary

10 May 1988 Friendly	Hungary	2–2	Denmark	Hungary

17 May 1988 Friendly	Hungary	0–4	Austria	Hungary

31 August 1988 Friendly	Austria	0–0	Hungary	Austria

21 September 1988 Friendly	Iceland	0–3	Hungary	Iceland

19 October 1988 1990 World Cup qualification	Hungary	1–0	Northern Ireland	Népstadion, Budapest
	Vincze 84'	(Report)		Attendance: 18,000; Referee: Kurt Röthlisberger (Switzerland)

15 November 1988 Friendly	Greece	3–0	Hungary	Piraeus, Greece
				Stadium: Karaiskakis Stadium

11 December 1988 1990 World Cup qualification	Malta	2–2	Hungary	Ta' Qali National Stadium, Attard
	Busuttil 46', 90'	(Report)	Vincze 5'; Kiprich 56'	Attendance: 9,964; Referee: Georgios Koukoulakis (Greece)

=== 1989 ===
8 March 1989 1990 World Cup qualification	Hungary	0–0	Republic of Ireland	Népstadion, Budapest
		(Report)		Attendance: 33,966; Referee: Zoran Petrović (Yugoslavia)

4 April 1989 Friendly	Hungary	3–0	Switzerland	Hungary

12 April 1989 1990 World Cup qualification	Hungary	1–1	Malta	Népstadion, Budapest
	Boda 49' (pen.)	(Report)	Busuttil 7'	Attendance: 25,000; Referee: Arie Frost (Israel)

26 April 1989 Friendly	Italy	4–0	Hungary	Taranto, Italy
15:30 CEST (UTC+02:00)	Vialli 8'; Ferri 53'; Berti 67'; Carnevale 77'	Report		Stadium: Stadio Erasmo Iacovone; Attendance: 23,700; Referee: Kurt Röthlisberger (Switzerland)

4 June 1989 1990 World Cup qualification	Republic of Ireland	2–0	Hungary	Lansdowne Road, Dublin
	McGrath 33'; Cascarino 80'	(Report)		Attendance: 48,600; Referee: Egil Nervik (Norway)

6 September 1989 1990 World Cup qualification	Northern Ireland	1–2	Hungary	Windsor Park, Belfast
	Whiteside 89'	(Report)	Kovács 13'; Bognár 44'	Attendance: 8,000; Referee: Erik Fredriksson (Sweden)

11 October 1989 1990 World Cup qualification	Hungary	2–2	Spain	Népstadion, Budapest
	Pintér 38', 82'	(Report)	Salinas 30'; Míchel 35'	Attendance: 30,000; Referee: George Courtney (England)

25 October 1989 Friendly	Hungary	1–1	Greece	Budapest, Hungary

15 November 1989 1990 World Cup qualification	Spain	4–0	Hungary	Estadio Ramón Sánchez Pizjuán, Seville
	Manolo 7'; Butragueño 24'; Juanito 40'; Fernando 63'	(Report)		Attendance: 20,000; Referee: Gérard Biguet (France)
