= Hungary at the FIFA World Cup =

International football delegation

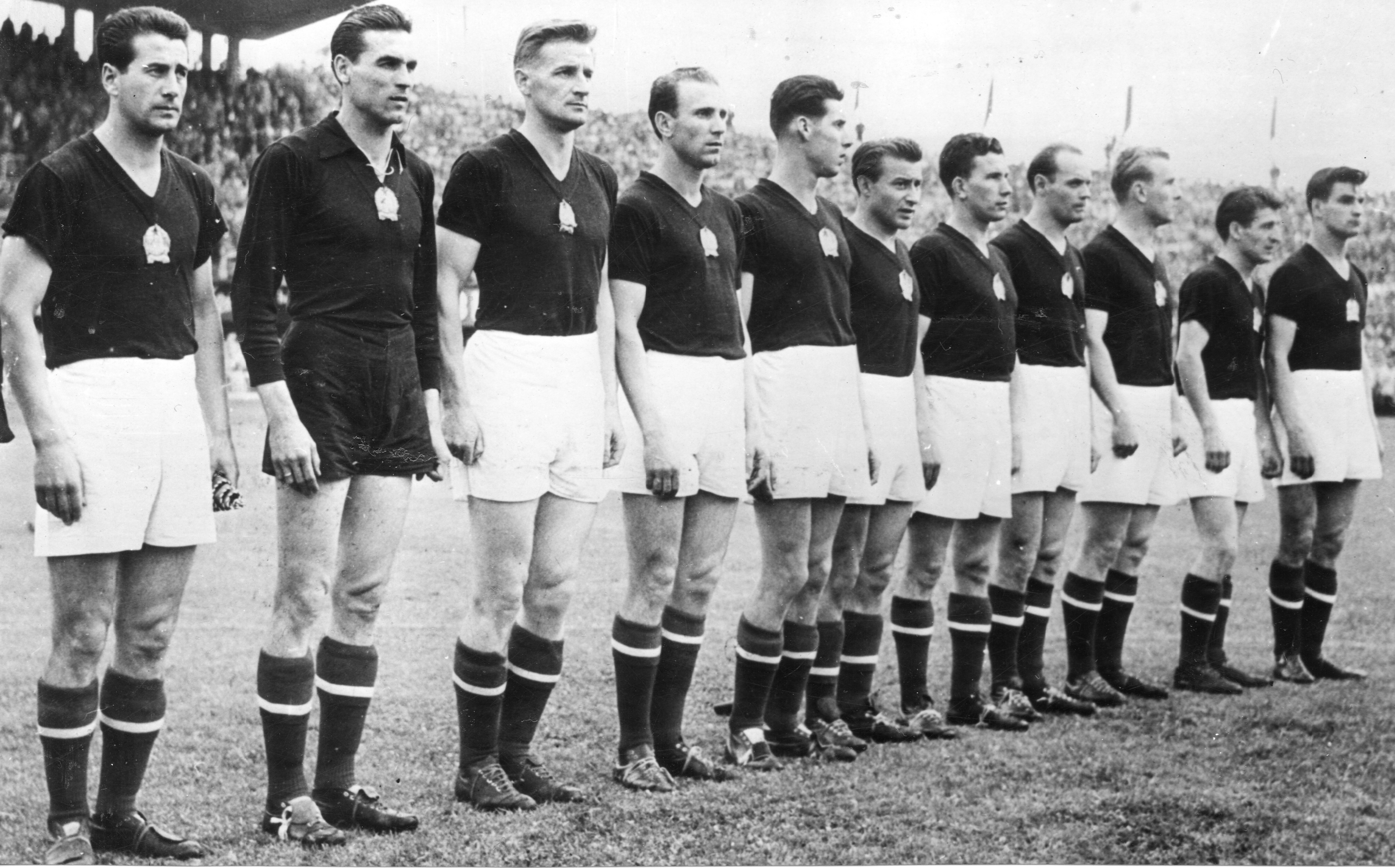
Hungary lining up for their semi-final match against Uruguay at the 1954 FIFA World Cup in Lausanne.

The FIFA World Cup is an international association football competition contested by the men's national teams of the members of Fédération Internationale de Football Association (FIFA), the sport's global governing body. The championship has been awarded every four years since the first tournament in 1930, except in 1942 and 1946, due to World War II.

The tournament consists of two parts, the qualification phase and the final phase (officially called the World Cup Finals). The qualification phase, which currently take place over the three years preceding the Finals, is used to determine which teams qualify for the Finals. The current format of the Finals involves 48 teams competing for the title, at venues within the host nation (or nations) over a period of about a month. The World Cup final is the most widely viewed sporting event in the world, with an estimated 715.1 million people watching the 2006 tournament final.

Hungary have appeared in the FIFA World Cup on nine occasions, the first being at the 1934, where they reached the quarter-finals. They have been runners-up on two occasions, in 1938 and 1954. They have failed to qualify for any World Cup tournament since 1986.

== Record at the FIFA World Cup ==
Year	Round	Position	Pld	W	D*	L	GF	GA
(Uruguay) 1930	Did not enter							
(Italy) 1934	Quarter-finals	6th	2	1	0	1	5	4
(France) 1938	Final	2nd	4	3	0	1	15	5
(Brazil) 1950	Did not enter							
(Switzerland) 1954	Final	2nd	5	4	0	1	27	10
(Sweden) 1958	Group Stage	10th	4	1	1	2	7	5
(Chile) 1962	Quarter-finals	5th	4	2	1	1	8	3
(England) 1966	Quarter-finals	6th	4	2	0	2	8	7
(Mexico) 1970	Did not qualify							
(West Germany) 1974	Did not qualify							
(Argentina) 1978	Group Stage	15th	3	0	0	3	3	8
(Spain) 1982	Group Stage	14th	3	1	1	1	12	6
(Mexico) 1986	Group Stage	18th	3	1	0	2	2	9
(Italy) 1990	Did not qualify							
(United States) 1994	Did not qualify							
(France) 1998	Did not qualify							
(South Korea) (Japan) 2002	Did not qualify							
(Germany) 2006	Did not qualify							
(South Africa) 2010	Did not qualify							
(Brazil) 2014	Did not qualify							
(Russia) 2018	Did not qualify							
(Qatar) 2022	Did not qualify							
(Canada) (Mexico) (United States) 2026	Did not qualify							
(Morocco) (Portugal) (Spain) 2030	To be determined							
(Saudi Arabia) 2034	To be determined							
Total	Runners-up	9/23	32	15	3	14	87	57

*Draws include knockout matches decided on penalty kicks

Hungary's World Cup record
First Match	Hungary 4–2 Egypt (27 May 1934; Naples, Italy)
Biggest Win	Hungary 9–0 South Korea (17 June 1954; Zürich, Switzerland); Hungary 10–1 El Salvador (15 June 1982; Elche, Spain)
Biggest Defeat	Soviet Union 6–0 Hungary (2 June 1986; Irapuato, Mexico)
Best Result	Runners-up in 1938 and 1954
Worst Result	Group stage in 1958, 1978, 1982 and 1986

=== By Match ===
World Cup	Round	Opponent	Score	Result	Venue	Scorers
1934	Round of 16	Egypt	4–2	W	Naples	G. Toldi (2), P. Teleki, J. Vincze
1934	Quarter-finals	Austria	1–2	L	Bologna	G. Sárosi
1938	Round of 16	Dutch East Indies	6–0	W	Reims	G. Sárosi (2), G. Zsengellér (2), V. Kohut, G. Toldi
1938	Quarter-finals	Switzerland	2–0	W	Lille	G. Sárosi, G. Zsengellér
1938	Semi-finals	Sweden	5–1	W	Paris	G. Zsengellér (2), S. Jacobsson (o.g.), P. Titkos, G. Sárosi
1938	Final	Italy	2–4	L	Paris	P. Titkos, G. Sárosi
1954	Group stage	South Korea	9–0	W	Zürich	S. Kocsis (3), F Puskás (2), P. Palotás (2), M. Lantos, Z. Czibor
1954	Group stage	West Germany	8–3	W	Basel	S. Kocsis (4), N. Hidegkuti (2), F. Puskás, J. Tóth
1954	Quarter-finals	Brazil	4–2	W	Bern	S. Kocsis (2), N. Hidegkuti, M. Lantos
1954	Semi-finals	Uruguay	4–2 (a.e.t.)	W	Lausanne	S. Kocsis (2), Z. Czibor, N. Hidegkuti
1954	Final	West Germany	2–3	L	Bern	F. Puskás, Z. Czibor
1958	Group 3	Wales	1–1	D	Sandviken	J. Bozsik
1958	Group 3	Sweden	1–2	L	Solna	L. Tichy
1958	Group 3	Mexico	4–0	W	Sandviken	L. Tichy (2), K. Sándor, J. Bencsics
1958	Group 3	Wales	1–2	L	Solna	L. Tichy
1962	Group 4	England	2–1	W	Rancagua	L. Tichy, F. Albert
1962	Group 4	Bulgaria	6–1	W	Rancagua	F. Albert (3), L. Tichy (2), E. Solymosi
1962	Group 4	Argentina	0–0	D	Rancagua	—
1962	Quarter-finals	Czechoslovakia	0–1	L	Rancagua	—
1966	Group 3	Portugal	1–3	L	Manchester	F. Bene
1966	Group 3	Brazil	3–1	W	Liverpool	F. Bene, J. Farkas, K. Mészöly
1966	Group 3	Bulgaria	3–1	W	Manchester	I. Davidov (o.g.), K. Mészöly, F. Bene
1966	Quarter-finals	Soviet Union	1–2	L	Sunderland	F. Bene
1978	Group 1	Argentina	1–2	L	Buenos Aires	K. Csapó
1978	Group 1	Italy	1–3	L	Mar del Plata	A. Tóth
1978	Group 1	France	1–3	L	Mar del Plata	S. Zombori
1982	Group 3	El Salvador	10–1	W	Elche	L. Kiss (3), T. Nyilasi (2), L. Fazekas (2), G. Pölöskei, J. Tóth, L. Szentes
1982	Group 3	Argentina	1–4	L	Alicante	G. Pölöskei
1982	Group 3	Belgium	1–1	D	Elche	J. Varga
1986	Group C	Soviet Union	0–6	L	Irapuato	—
1986	Group C	Canada	2–0	W	Irapuato	M. Esterházy, L. Détári
1986	Group C	France	0–3	L	León	—

=== Record by Opponent ===
FIFA World Cup matches (by team)
Opponent	Wins	Draws	Losses	Total	Goals Scored	Goals Conceded
Argentina	0	1	2	3	2	6
Austria	0	0	1	1	1	2
Belgium	0	1	0	1	1	1
Brazil	2	0	0	2	7	3
Bulgaria	2	0	0	2	9	2
Canada	1	0	0	1	2	0
Czechoslovakia	0	0	1	1	0	1
Dutch East Indies	1	0	0	1	6	0
Egypt	1	0	0	1	4	2
El Salvador	1	0	0	1	10	1
England	1	0	0	1	2	1
France	0	0	2	2	1	6
Italy	0	0	2	2	3	7
Mexico	1	0	0	1	4	0
Portugal	0	0	1	1	1	3
South Korea	1	0	0	1	9	0
Soviet Union	0	0	2	2	1	8
Sweden	1	0	1	2	6	3
Switzerland	1	0	0	1	2	0
Uruguay	1	0	0	1	4	2
Wales	0	1	1	2	2	3
West Germany	1	0	1	2	10	6

== FIFA World Cup Finals ==
=== 1938 World Cup Final v Italy ===
The third edition of the FIFA World Cup was the first without the host team competing in the final. At half-time, defending champions Italy were leading by 3-1 and Hungary did not manage to get back into the game.

19 June 1938
17:00 (WEST)

Italy	4–2	Hungary
Colaussi 6', 35'; Piola 16', 82'	Report	Titkos 8'; Sárosi 70'

Stade Olympique de Colombes, Paris (France)
Attendance: 45,000
Referee: Georges Capdeville (France)

GK	Aldo Olivieri
RB	Alfredo Foni
LB	Pietro Rava
RH	Pietro Serantoni
LH	Ugo Locatelli
CH	Michele Andreolo
IR	Giuseppe Meazza (c)
IL	Giovanni Ferrari
OR	Amedeo Biavati
CF	Silvio Piola
OL	Gino Colaussi
Manager:
(Italy) Vittorio Pozzo

GK	Antal Szabó
RB	Sándor Bíró
LB	Gyula Polgár
RH	Gyula Lázár
LH	Antal Szalay
CH	György Szűcs
IR	Gyula Zsengellér
IL	Jenő Vincze
OR	Pál Titkos
CF	György Sárosi (c)
OL	Ferenc Sas
Manager:
(Hungary) Alfréd Schaffer

=== 1954 World Cup Final v West Germany ===
The Hungarian Golden Team were favourites for winning the World Cup in Switzerland in 1954 after 31 unbeaten games in the previous five years, among them a recent 7-1 against England and an 8–3 against their West German opponents in the group stage only two weeks before the final.

In one of the greatest comebacks in football history, the favoured Hungarians were defeated 2-3 despite an early 2–0 lead.

4 July 1954
17:00 CET

West Germany	3–2	Hungary
Morlock 10'; Rahn 18', 84'	Report	Puskás 6'; Czibor 8'

Wankdorf Stadium, Bern (Switzerland)
Attendance: 62,500
Referee: William Ling (England)

GK	1	Toni Turek
RB	7	Josef Posipal
CB	10	Werner Liebrich
LB	3	Werner Kohlmeyer
HB	6	Horst Eckel
HB	8	Karl Mai
IR	13	Max Morlock
IL	16	Fritz Walter (c)
OR	12	Helmut Rahn
CF	15	Ottmar Walter
OL	20	Hans Schäfer
Manager:
(West Germany) Sepp Herberger

GK	1	Gyula Grosics
RB	2	Jenő Buzánszky
CB	3	Gyula Lóránt
LB	4	Mihály Lantos
HB	5	József Bozsik
HB	6	József Zakariás
RW	11	Zoltán Czibor
AM	9	Nándor Hidegkuti
LW	20	Mihály Tóth
CF	8	Sándor Kocsis
CF	10	Ferenc Puskás (c)
Manager:
(Hungary) Gusztáv Sebes

== Record players ==
Rank	Player	Matches	World Cups
1	Sándor Mátrai	12	1958, 1962 and 1966
1	Ferenc Sipos	12	1958, 1962 and 1966
3	Gyula Grosics	11	1954, 1958 and 1962
4	József Bozsik	8	1954 and 1958
4	László Sárosi	8	1958 and 1962
4	Lajos Tichy	8	1958 and 1962
4	Kálmán Mészöly	8	1962 and 1966
8	Flórián Albert	7	1962 and 1966
8	Gyula Rákosi	7	1962 and 1966
10	Nándor Hidegkuti	6	1954 and 1958
10	Máté Fenyvesi	6	1958 and 1962
10	Károly Sándor	6	1958 and 1962
10	Győző Martos	6	1978 and 1982
10	Imre Garaba	6	1982 and 1986
10	Sándor Sallai	6	1982 and 1986

== Top goalscorers ==
With 11 goals in five matches in 1954, Sándor Kocsis beat Brazilian Ademir's existing record of nine goals in one tournament from 1950. However, only four years later the record was in turn beaten by Just Fontaine.

Rank	Player	Goals	World Cups
1	Sándor Kocsis	11	1954
2	Lajos Tichy	7	1958 (4) and 1962 (3)
3	György Sárosi	6	1934 (1) and 1938 (5)
4	Gyula Zsengellér	5	1938
5	Nándor Hidegkuti	4	1954
5	Ferenc Puskás	4	1954
5	Flórián Albert	4	1962
5	Ferenc Bene	4	1966
9	Géza Toldi	3	1934 (2) and 1938 (1)
9	Zoltán Czibor	3	1954
9	László Kiss	3	1982

== Goalscorers by tournament ==
World Cup	Goalscorer(s)
1934	Géza Toldi(2), György Sárosi, Pál Teleki, Jenő Vincze
1938	György Sárosi(5), Gyula Zsengellér(5), Pál Titkos(2), Vilmos Kohut, Géza Toldi, Own Goal
1954	Sándor Kocsis(11), Nándor Hidegkuti(4), Ferenc Puskás(4), Zoltán Czibor(3), Mihály Lantos(2), Péter Palotás(2), József Tóth
1958	Lajos Tichy(4), József Bencsics, József Bozsik, Károly Sándor
1962	Flórián Albert(4), Lajos Tichy(3), Ernő Solymosi
1966	Ferenc Bene(4), Kálmán Mészöly(2), János Farkas, Own Goal
1978	Károly Csapó, András Tóth, Sándor Zombori
1982	László Kiss(3), László Fazekas(2), Tibor Nyilasi(2), Gábor Pölöskei(2), Lázár Szentes, József Tóth, József Varga
1986	Lajos Détári, Márton Esterházy

== See also ==
- Hungary at the UEFA European Championship
