= Eduardo Hernández =

Eduardo Hernández may refer to:

- Eduardo Hernández Moncada (1899–1995), Mexican composer, pianist and conductor
- Eduardo Hernández (goalkeeper) (born 1958), Salvadoran football goalkeeper
- Eduardo Hernández (forward) (fl. 1960s), Salvadoran football forward
- Eduardo Hernández (boxer) (born 1997), Mexican boxer
- Eduardo Hernández-Sonseca (born 1983), Spanish basketball player
- Eduardo Hernandez (musician) (fl. 1996–2022), trombonist for the ska band Mad Caddies
- Ed Maverick (born 2001), born Eduardo Hernández Saucedo, Mexican singer, songwriter and producer
