= Pölöskei =

Pölöskei is a Hungarian surname. Notable people with the surname include:

- Gábor Pölöskei (born 1960), Hungarian football player and manager
- Péter Pölöskei (born 1988), Hungarian football player
- Zsolt Pölöskei (born 1991), Hungarian football player
