= Jovel =

Jovel may refer to:

- San Cristóbal de las Casas, city in Chiapas, Mexico
- Carlos Francisco Jovel Navas (born 1982), Salvadoran footballer
- José Francisco Jovel (born 1951), Salvadoran footballer
