= SC Eendracht Aalst =

Former Belgian football club

Eendracht Aalst
- Full name: Sporting Club Eendracht Aalst
- Nicknames: De Ajuinen (The Onions), Den Iendracht
- Founded: 25 June 1919; 107 years ago
- Dissolved: February 2025; 1 year ago
- Ground: Pierre Cornelisstadion, Aalst
- Capacity: 4,500
- 2023–24: Belgian Division 2 VV A, 1st of 18
- Website: Official website
| Home colours | Away colours |

SC Eendracht Aalst was a Belgian football club based in Aalst, East Flanders. The club last played in the Belgian Provincial Leagues but were declared bankrupt and folded in 2025. The club merged with Jong Lede to form Eendracht Aalst Lede under the matricule number of Jong Lede.

== History ==
During World War I, citizens from Aalst played football matches to raise money for prisoners of war. In 1919 Sport-Club Eendracht Aalst became an official football team. After some friendly games in 1923, SC Eendracht Aalst joined the regional competition. They quickly moved their way up through the regional divisions and after moving the stadium to the current location in 1928, the team made it into the national competition in 1932. Only seven years later, in 1939, Aalst were promoted to the Eredivisie (the current Belgian Pro League). Due to the second World War competition was not played for two years, so it wasn't until 1942 Aalst finished its first season in the Eredivisie. In 1946 the chairman died and it was decided to rename the stadium to honour him, from then on it was called the Pierre Cornelis Stadium. That year was the beginning of a very dark period for Eendracht Aalst. Due to changes in the competition format, they were forced into relegation. After this they played in the lower division for more than 30 years. In 1960 they managed to get back into the Eredivisie, but in 1962 they ended last and were relegated again. In 1965, after a bribery affair, Aalst was relegated to the lowest national division. In 1977 they made it back into the second division, with Paul Van Himst in the team. In 1994 the team finally joined the first division again. Jan Ceulemans (manager), Godwin Okpara and Gilles De Bilde were some of the most important factors towards success. In 1995 a new climax was reached when they were allowed to enter the European competition and even survived the first round against Levski Sofia.

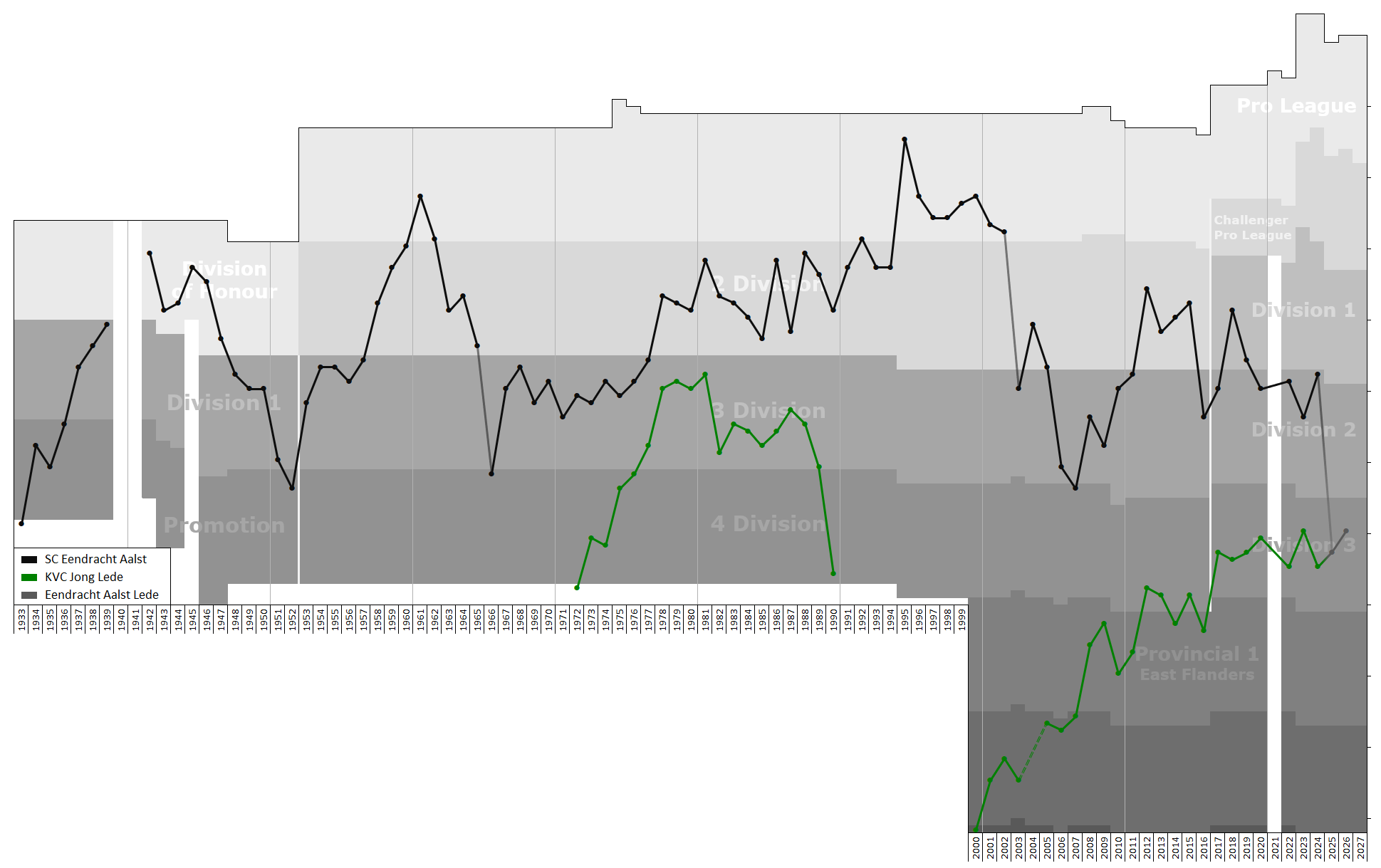
Historical chart of Eendracht Aalst league performance

It changed its name in 2002 after former Belgian First Division club K.S.C. Eendracht Aalst had gone into liquidation. So they could not get the license and the new team began at the third division level. They played the next two seasons in second division (2003–2005) and are now back to the third division and they are at the 3rd place. While the 2004–05 championship was over, the club needed to know if first division side F.C. Brussels and second division side R.E. Virton were to receive the professional football license to know where they would play next season. While 17th K. Patro Maasmechelen had no license, they were obviously relegated. So if one of the two submentionned clubs were refused the license, Aalst would have had played the third division playoffs while if they were both refused the license, Aalst would have remained in second division. Finally, both clubs did receive it so the team was relegated. In 2011, the name of the team got changed back to S.C. Eendracht Aalst. They've also requested to change the name back to the former K.S.C. Eendracht Aalst, which will be possible in 2012, if they receive good advice from the Royal Belgian Football Association (RBFA).

In 2023–24, Eendracht Aalst won their region of Belgian Division 2 and would have been promoted, however the club was refused a license to play in Belgian National Division 1. They were also refused a license to participate in Division 2 and Division 3 and were forced to relegate down to the Belgian Provincial Leagues. Eventually, due to not having a ground to play in, Eendracht Aalst were expelled from the first provincial league and were forced to relegate down to the second provincial league for the 2025-26 season. In February 2025, the club was officially declared bankrupt and ceased to exist.

== Stadium ==
The Pierre Cornelisstadion is located in Bredestraat, Aalst, near the city center. It has a capacity of 4,500 and was built in the early 1930s.

== Honours ==
- Belgian Second Division final round:
  - Winners (2): 1991, 1994
- Belgian Promotion B:
  - Champions: 2006–07
- Belgian Third Division:
  - Champions: 2010–11
- Belgian Division 2:
  - Champions: 2023–24

== UEFA cup history ==
| Season | Competition | Round | Country | Club | Home | Away | Aggregate |
|---|---|---|---|---|---|---|---|
| 1995–96 | UEFA Cup | 1 | (Bulgaria) | Levski Sofia | 1–0 | 2–1 | 3–1 |
| 1995–96 | UEFA Cup | 2 | (Italy) | Roma | 0–0 | 0–4 | 0–4 |

== Previous managers ==
- (Belgium) Jan Ceulemans
- (Belgium) Wim De Coninck
- (Belgium) Maurits De Schrijver
- (Belgium) Patrick De Wilde
- (Belgium) Etienne De Wispelaere
- (Belgium) Manu Ferrera
- (Belgium) Georges Heylens
- (Belgium) Urbain Haesaert
- (Belgium) Luc Limpens
- (Belgium) Alain Merckx
- (Belgium) Lorenzo Staelens
- (Belgium) Gilbert Bodart
- (Belgium) Gaston Van Der Elst
- (Belgium) Geert Van Roy
- (Belgium) Michel Verschueren (physical trainer)
- (Hungary) Laszlo Fazekas
- (Netherlands) Henk Houwaert
- (Netherlands) Barry Hulshoff
- (Socialist Federal Republic of Yugoslavia) Tomislav Ivic

== Women's football ==
The female team of Eendracht Aalst plays in the Super League. and played his homematches in the Jeugdcentrum Zandberg.
