= Attila Kerekes =

Hungarian footballer

Personal information
- Date of birth: 4 April 1954 (age 72)
- Place of birth: Budapest, Hungary
- Height: 1.82 m (5 ft 11 1/2 in)
- Position: Defender

Senior career*
Years	Team	Apps	(Gls)
1972–1985	Békéscsaba	294	(14)
1985–1987	Bursaspor	64	(2)
1987–1988	Békéscsaba		

International career
1976–1983	Hungary	15	(0)
- * Club domestic league appearances and goals

Attila Kerekes (born 4 April 1954) is a Hungarian former footballer who played at both professional and international levels as a defender.

== Career ==
Born in Budapest, Kerekes played club football in both Hungary and Turkey for Békéscsaba and Bursaspor.

He also earned 15 caps for the Hungary national team between 1976 and 1984, representing them at the 1982 FIFA World Cup.
