= Béla Katzirz =

Hungarian footballer

Personal information
- Date of birth: 27 April 1953 (age 73)
- Place of birth: Budapest, Hungary
- Height: 1.95 m (6 ft 5 in)
- Position: Goalkeeper

Senior career*
Years	Team	Apps	(Gls)
1973–1983	Pécsi Munkás	197	(0)
1983–1986	Sporting Lisbon	30	(0)
1986	Pécsi Munkás	0	(0)
Total		227	(0)

International career
1978–1983	Hungary	22	(0)
- * Club domestic league appearances and goals

Béla Katzirz (born 27 April 1953) is a former Hungarian international football player.

== Career ==
Katzirz began his career with the Hungarian first division club Pécsi Munkás SC, where he played for 10.5 seasons. In 1983, Katzirz joined the Portuguese Liga side Sporting Clube de Portugal, replacing departed fellow Hungarian international Ferenc Mészáros. He remained with Sporting for three seasons before returning to Hungary.

Katzirz made several appearances for the Hungary national football team, including three 1982 World Cup qualifying matches and several Euro 1980 and Euro 1984 qualifying matches. He was part of the Hungary squad at the 1982 World Cup finals, but was an unused reserve.

== Personal ==
His son, Dávid Katzirz, is a professional handball player.
