= Marc Baecke =

Belgian footballer (1956–2017)

- Baecke for Belgium in 1982

Personal information
- Date of birth: 24 July 1956
- Place of birth: Sint-Niklaas, Belgium
- Date of death: 21 January 2017 (aged 60)
- Place of death: Beveren, Belgium
- Height: 1.76 m (5 ft 9 1/2 in)
- Position: Defender

Senior career*
Years	Team	Apps	(Gls)
1976–1986	Beveren	244	(9)
1986–1988	Kortrijk	21	(0)
Total		265	(9)

International career
1977–1984	Belgium	15	(0)
- * Club domestic league appearances and goals

Marc Baecke (24 July 1956 – 21 January 2017) was a Belgian footballer who played as a left back.

== Club career ==
During his career he played for Beveren, with whom he won two league titles and two Belgian Cups, only to finish his career with two seasons at Kortrijk.

== International career ==
He earned 15 caps for the Belgium national football team, and participated in the 1982 FIFA World Cup and UEFA Euro 1984.

== Personal life ==
He was said to suffer from Buerger disease and his left leg was removed after he suffered an infection from an open wound in December 2013.

=== Death ===
Baecke died in January 2017 after a long illness.

== Honours ==
Beveren

- Belgian First Division: 1978–79, 1983–84
- Belgian Cup: 1977–78, 1982–83, Runners-up: 1979–80
- Belgian Supercup: 1979, 1984
