= Maurits De Schrijver =

Belgian footballer (born 1951)

Personal information
- Date of birth: 26 June 1951 (age 75)
- Place of birth: Aalst, Belgium
- Position: Defender

Senior career*
Years	Team	Apps	(Gls)
1974–1986	Lokeren	295	(7)
- Eendracht Zele

International career
1982	Belgium	4	(0)

Managerial career
- 2005–2006: Eendracht Aalst
- * Club domestic league appearances and goals

Maurits De Schrijver (born 26 June 1951 in Aalst) is a retired Belgian footballer.

== Career ==
During his career he played for Lokeren.

De Schrijver made his debut for Belgium in a May 1982 friendly match against Denmark and has earned a total of 4 caps, scoring no goals. He has represented his country at the 1982 FIFA World Cup. His final international was a December 1982 UEFA Euro 1984 qualifying match against Scotland.
