= José Van Tuyne =

Argentine footballer

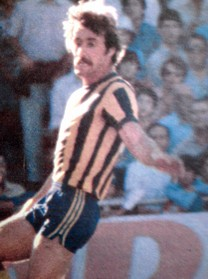

Personal information
- Full name: José Daniel Van Tuyne
- Date of birth: 13 December 1954 (age 71)
- Place of birth: Rosario, Argentina
- Position: Defender

Senior career*
Years	Team	Apps	(Gls)
1974–1979	Rosario Central	159	(1)
1980	Talleres de Córdoba	43	(2)
1981–1982	Racing Club	37	(2)
1982–1987	Millonarios	106	(5)
Total		345	(10)

International career
1979–1982	Argentina	11	(0)
- * Club domestic league appearances and goals as of 3 September 2007

José Daniel Van Tuyne (born 13 December 1954 in Rosario) is an Argentine former footballer who played as a defender.

== Club career ==
Van Tuyne started his career with Rosario Central in 1974. He joined Talleres de Córdoba in 1980 and then Racing Club in 1981.

In 1982 Van Tuyne left Argentine football to play for Millonarios in Colombia. Van Tuyne's ancestors were Belgian immigrants, hence the unusual surname. Other famous Argentinian footballers like Fernando Paternoster and Rafael Albrecht also had Belgian roots.

== International career ==
Van Tuyne was included in the Argentina squad for the Copa América 1979 and the 1982 FIFA World Cup.
