= Mario Castillo =

Salvadoran footballer (born 1951)

Personal information
- Full name: Mario Alfonso Castillo Díaz
- Date of birth: 31 October 1951 (age 75)
- Place of birth: San Miguel, El Salvador
- Height: 1.74 m (5 ft 9 in)
- Position: Defender

Youth career
- 1966–1967: El Salvador
- 1970–1972: Dragón

Senior career*
Years	Team	Apps	(Gls)
1972–1977	Águila		
1978–1983	Santiagueño		
1984–1985	Alianza		
1986–1987	Águila		

International career
1979–1982	El Salvador	13	(0)
- * Club domestic league appearances and goals

Mario Alfonso Castillo Díaz (born 30 October 1951 in San Miguel, El Salvador) is a retired football player.

== Club career ==
Nicknamed Macora, he started his career at local side Dragón when 18 years of age and later played for Águila, with whom he won 3 league titles. In 1978, he joined the star-studded team of Santiagueño, winning another league title with them, and moved to Alianza in 1984 before returning to Águila to end his career with them.

=== Retirement ===
Since his retirement from football in 1987, he has been working as a sales manager of a car-service company in his hometown.

== International career ==
Castillo has represented El Salvador in 7 FIFA World Cup qualification matches, but most notably played for his country at the 1982 FIFA World Cup in Spain.

== Honours ==
- Primera División de Fútbol de El Salvador: 4

1972, 1976, 1977, 1980
