= Ibrahim Youssef Al-Doy =

Bahraini football referee

Ibrahim Yusuf Al-Doy (Arabic: إبراهيم يوسف الدوي; born 22 January 1945) is a Bahraini retired football referee. He is known for having refereed one match in the 1982 FIFA World Cup in Spain, which was Hungary's record 10–1 win over El Salvador in Elche on 15 June 1982.
