= László Fazekas =

Hungarian footballer (1947–2026)

- Fazekas with Royal Antwerp

Personal information
- Date of birth: 15 October 1947
- Place of birth: Budapest, Hungary
- Date of death: 6 May 2026 (aged 78)
- Height: 1.78 m (5 ft 10 in)
- Position: Forward

Senior career*
Years	Team	Apps	(Gls)
1965–1980	Újpesti Dózsa	407	(252)
1980–1984	Royal Antwerp	111	(38)
1984–1985	Sint-Truiden	28	(10)
Total		546	(300)

International career
1968–1983	Hungary	92	(24)

Managerial career
- 1985–1986: Racing Jet Bruxelles
- 1986–1988: Eendracht Aalst
- 1988–1990: Harelbeke
- 1990–1992: Eendracht Aalst
- 1992–1994: Union Saint-Gilloise
- 1994–1995: Hungary (assistant)
- 1995–1996: Royal Antwerp
- * Club domestic league appearances and goals

László Fazekas (15 October 1947 – 6 May 2026) was a Hungarian footballer who played as a forward. He made the third most international games for the Hungary national team, appearing in the 1978 and the 1982 FIFA World Cups. In the latter tournament, he scored two long shots in the 10–1 win over El Salvador at the Estadio Manuel Martínez Valero stadium. He also competed for Hungary at the 1968 Summer Olympics. He spent his entire career in Hungary with Újpesti Dózsa, having won a total of nine championships, before moving to Belgium, where he became a popular character, as well, having played for Royal Antwerp before finishing his playing career at Sint-Truiden. He decided to stay in Belgium and remained in football as manager of several teams, including Royal Antwerp. Fazekas died on 6 May 2026, at the age of 78 from complications related to Amyotrophic lateral sclerosis.
