= Joaquín Ventura =

Salvadoran footballer (born 1956)

Personal information
- Full name: Joaquín Alonso Ventura
- Date of birth: 27 October 1956 (age 70)
- Place of birth: El Salvador
- Position: Midfielder

Senior career*
Years	Team	Apps	(Gls)
1974–1980	Águila		
1980–1982	Santiagueño		
1982–1988	Águila		

International career
1980–1982	El Salvador	10	(0)
- * Club domestic league appearances and goals as of 2007

Joaquín Alonso Ventura (born 27 October 1956) is a retired Salvadoran football player.

== Club career ==
Nicknamed La Muerte (The death), Ventura played for Salvadoran sides Santiagueño and Águila, with whom he won the 1976 CONCACAF Champions' Cup.

== International career ==
Ventura has represented his country in 4 FIFA World Cup qualification matches and played in all of their games at the 1982 World Cup in Spain.

== Retirement ==
After retiring Ventura became a fitness instructor and English teacher.
