= Francisco Osorto =

Salvadoran footballer (1957–2023)

Personal information
- Full name: Francisco Salvador Osorto Guardado
- Date of birth: 20 March 1957
- Place of birth: Santa Rosa de Lima, El Salvador
- Date of death: 26 February 2023 (aged 65)
- Height: 1.72 m (5 ft 8 in)
- Position: Defender

Youth career
- Municipal Limeño

Senior career*
| Years | Team | Apps | (Gls) |
| 1972-1976 | Municipal Limeño | | |
| 1976–1977 | LA Firpo | | |
| 1977–1982 | Santiagueño | | |
| 1983–1987 | Municipal Limeño | | |
| 1987-1988 | CESSA | | |

International career
| 1979–1982 | El Salvador | 24 | (0) |
- * Club domestic league appearances and goals

Francisco "Pancho" Salvador Osorto Guardado (20 March 1957 – 26 February 2023) was a Salvadoran footballer who played as a defender.

== Club career ==
Osorto won the Nacional Liga B league title in 1983 with his hometown club Municipal Limeño.

== International career ==
Nicknamed Pancho, Osorto represented his country in five FIFA World Cup qualification matches and played at the 1982 FIFA World Cup in Spain. In 1977, he scored for El Salvador in an 8–0 drubbing of Nicaragua in qualification for the 1978 Central American and Caribbean Games.

== Personal life and death ==
Osorto was married to Evelyn Rubio and the couple have four sons. His son Heraldo Salvador Osorto was a professional footballer with Atlético Marte and San Salvador.

Osorto died from liver failure on 26 February 2023, at the age of 65.

== Honours ==
Municipal Limeno

- Liga B: 1983

Santiagueno

- Primera División de Fútbol de El Salvador: 1979-1980

El Salvador

- Central American and Caribbean Games: 1978
