= Belaïd Lacarne =

Algerian football referee (1940–2024)

- Born: 26 October 1940; Sidi Bel Abbès, French Algeria
- Died: 15 October 2024 (aged 83); Sidi Bel Abbès, Algeria

International
Years	League	Role
1978–1987	FIFA-listed	Referee

Belaïd Lacarne (Arabic: بلعيد لاكارن; 26 October 1940 – 15 October 2024) was an Algerian football referee.

== Life and career ==
Lacarne refereed one match in the 1982 FIFA World Cup in Spain between Argentina and Hungary. He was also a linesman for five matches in the tournament including the third and fourth place decider between Poland and France. In addition, he was an official at the 1980 Summer Olympics.

He was nominated onto the Confederation of African Football committee in 2002, a member of the Refereeing Committee for the 2004 African Cup of Nations, and was a member of the FIFA Referee Committee.

Lacarne died in Sidi Bel Abbès on 15 October 2024, at the age of 83.
