= Estadio Martínez Valero =

Stadium in Elche, Spain

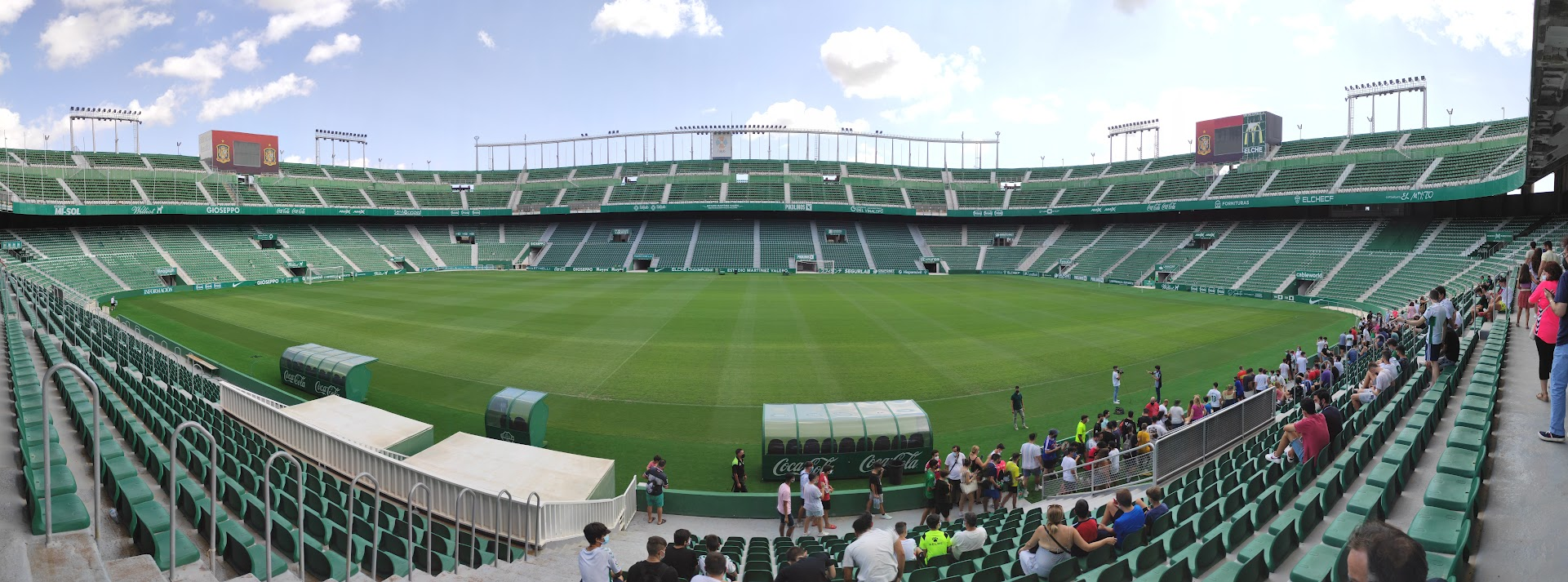
- Interactive map of Estadio Martínez Valero
- Former names: Nuevo Estadio del Elche C.F. (1976–1988)
- Location: Elche, Spain
- Coordinates: 38°16′01″N 0°39′48″W
- Owner: Elche CF
- Operator: Elche CF
- Capacity: 31,388
- Field size: 108 metres (118 yd) x 70 metres (77 yd)

Construction
- Opened: 8 September 1976
- Architect: Juan Boix Matarredona

Tenants
- Elche CF (1976–present); Spain national football team (selected matches)

The Estadio Martínez Valero is a stadium located in the Spanish city of Elche in the province of Alicante, Valencian Community. It is the home stadium of Elche CF, a team that is currently playing in Primera División, LaLiga. Its name pays tribute to the late president of the club, Manuel Martínez Valero. It hosted the largest rout in the finals of a World Cup and hosted the final of the Copa del Rey in 2003. The Spanish football team has played several friendly matches and competitive qualifiers there.

With a capacity of 31,388 seats, Martínez Valero is the 15th-largest stadium in Spain and the 2nd-largest in the Valencian community.

== History ==
The Martínez Valero Stadium was inaugurated on 8 September 1976, replacing the former Campo de Altabix, which was constructed in 1923. It was designed by the architect Juan Boix Matarredona, and is currently the largest sports arena in the province of Alicante. The inaugural match was Elche CF v. the Mexico national team, which ended in a 3–3 tie. Elche CF's goals were scored by Finarolli, Orellana and Gomez Voglino. It was one of 17 stadiums where matches took place in the 1982 FIFA World Cup. On June 15, 1982, it was the venue as Hungary achieved a record winning margin in World Cup history, beating El Salvador by a score of 10–1 before a crowd of 23,000. In addition, the Martínez Valero Stadium hosted the final of the Copa del Rey for the 2002–03 season. It is listed by UEFA as a four-star UEFA Elite Stadium.

In the 2013–2014 season the stadium received the AFEPE (organization which unites fan clubs of all Spanish clubs) Award for Best La Liga Stadium.

== International matches ==
=== Spain national team matches ===
Date	Opponent	Score	Competition
19 February 1986	Belgium	3–0	Friendly match
15 November 1995	Macedonia	3–0	UEFA Euro 1996 qualifying
10 September 2003	Ukraine	2–1	UEFA Euro 2004 qualifying
3 June 2006	Egypt	2–0	Friendly match
26 March 2008	Italy	1–0	Friendly match
11 September 2018	Croatia	6–0	2018–19 UEFA Nations League
11 October 2025	Georgia	2–0	2026 FIFA World Cup qualification

=== 1982 FIFA World Cup ===
The stadium was one of the venues of the 1982 FIFA World Cup (known as the Nuevo Estadio at the time of the tournament), and held the following matches:

Date	Team #1	Res.	Team #2	Round	Attendance
15 June 1982	Hungary	10–1	El Salvador	Group 3 (first round)	23,000
19 June 1982	Belgium	1–0	El Salvador	Group 3 (first round)	15,000
22 June 1982	Belgium	1–1	Hungary	Group 3 (first round)	37,000

== Gallery ==
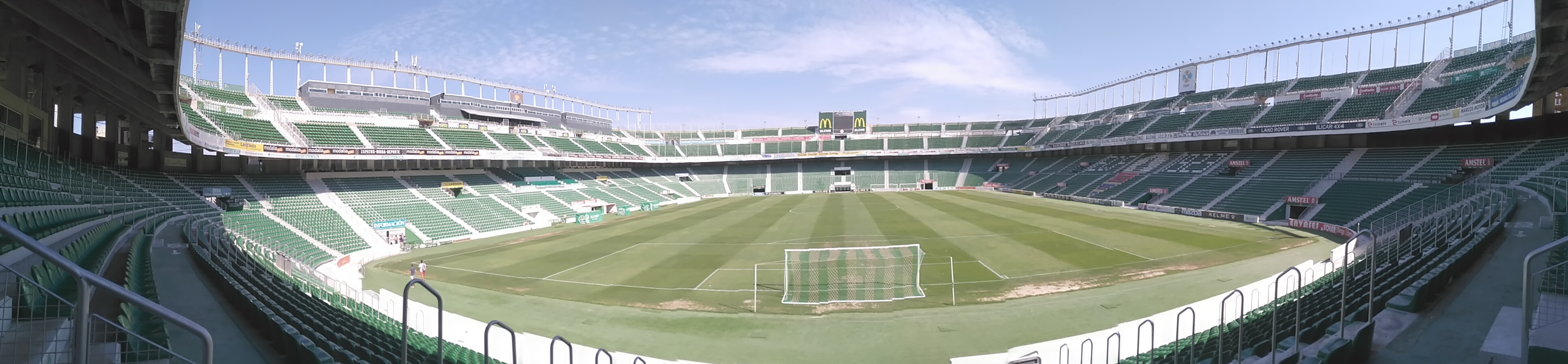

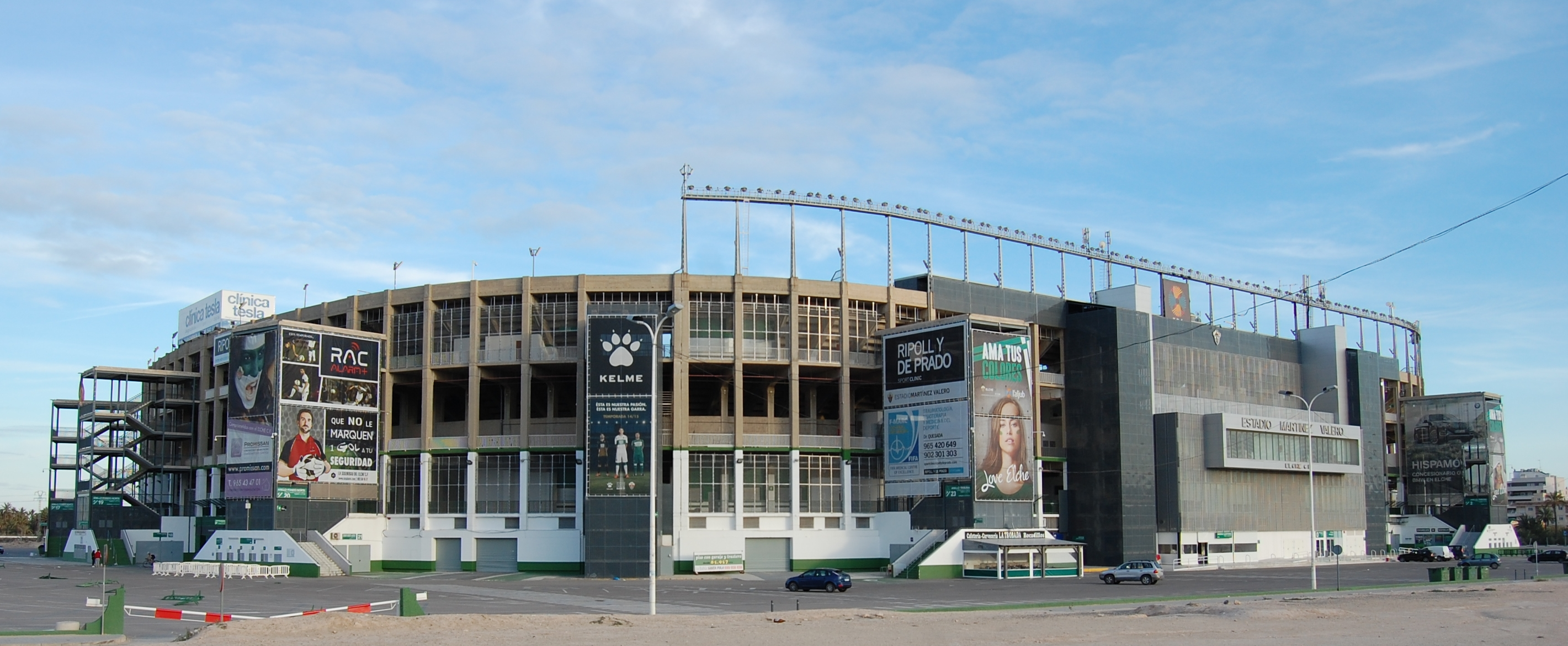

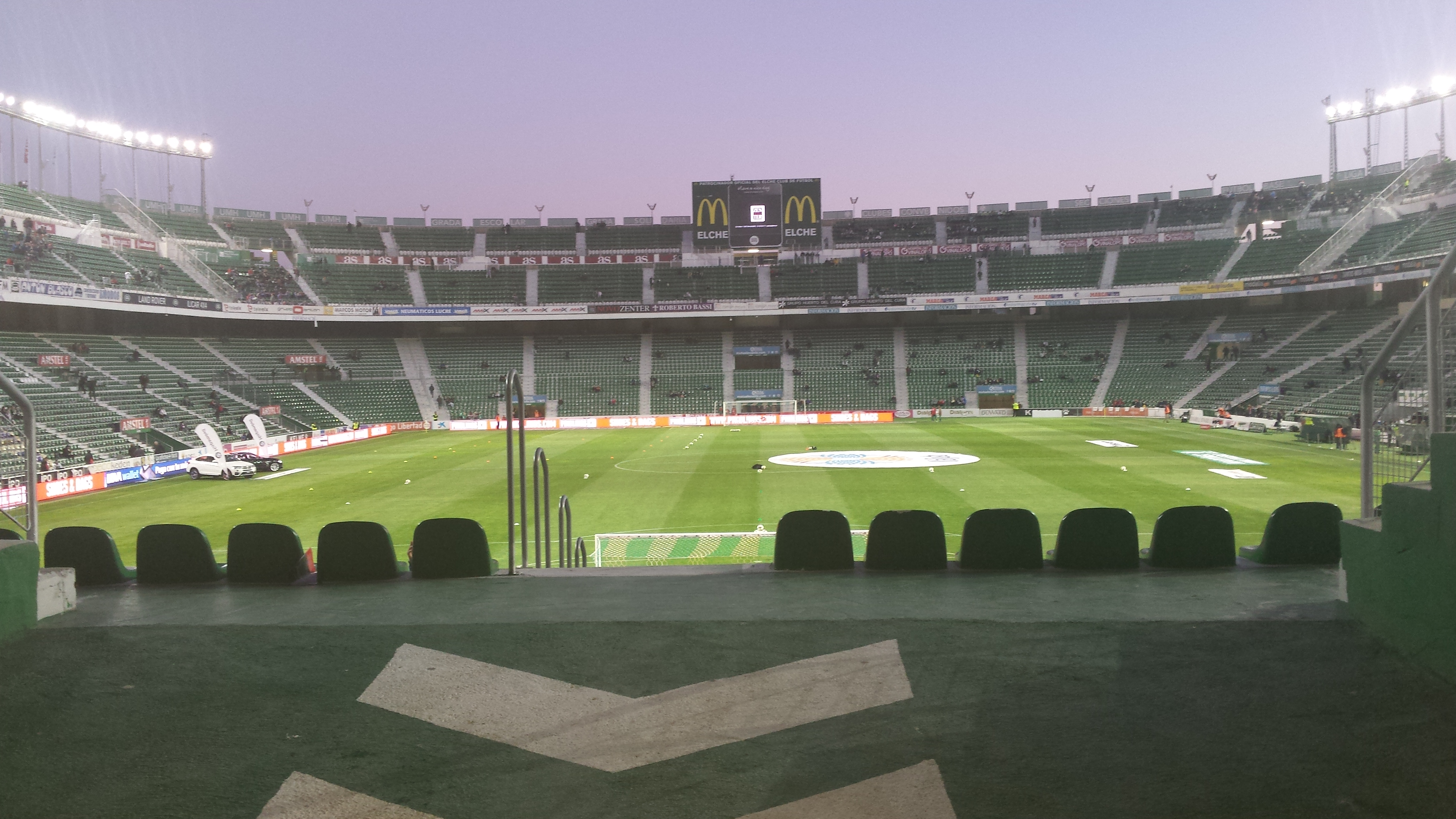

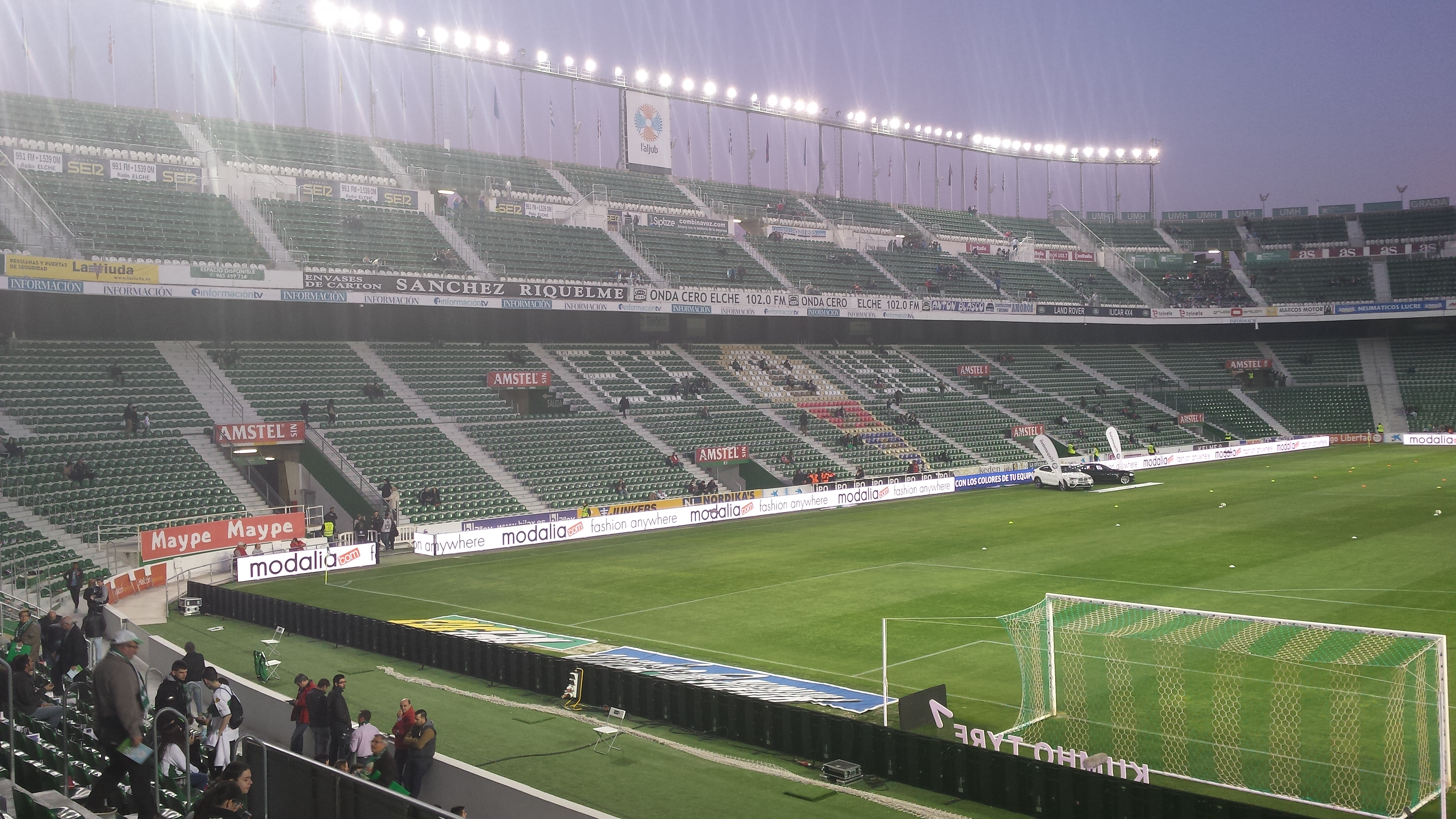

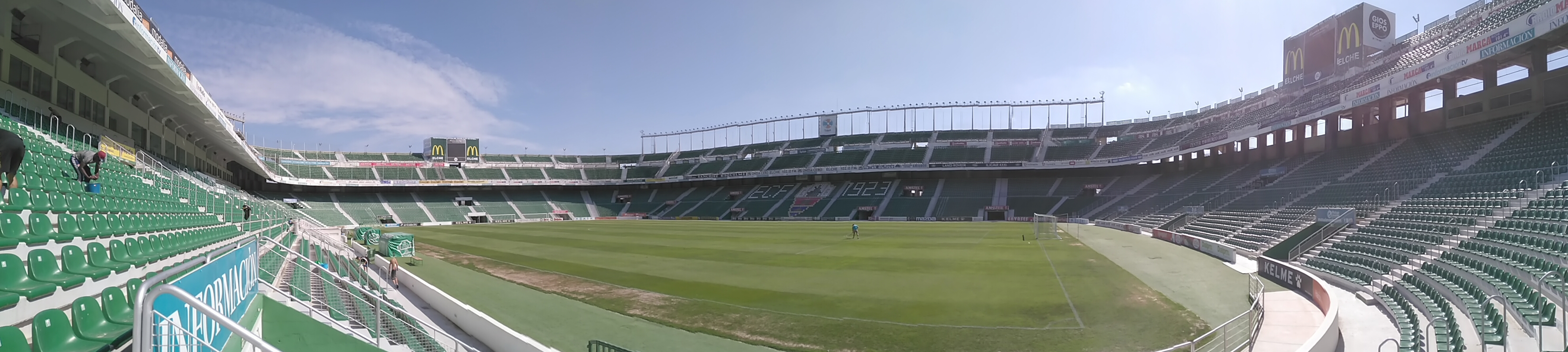

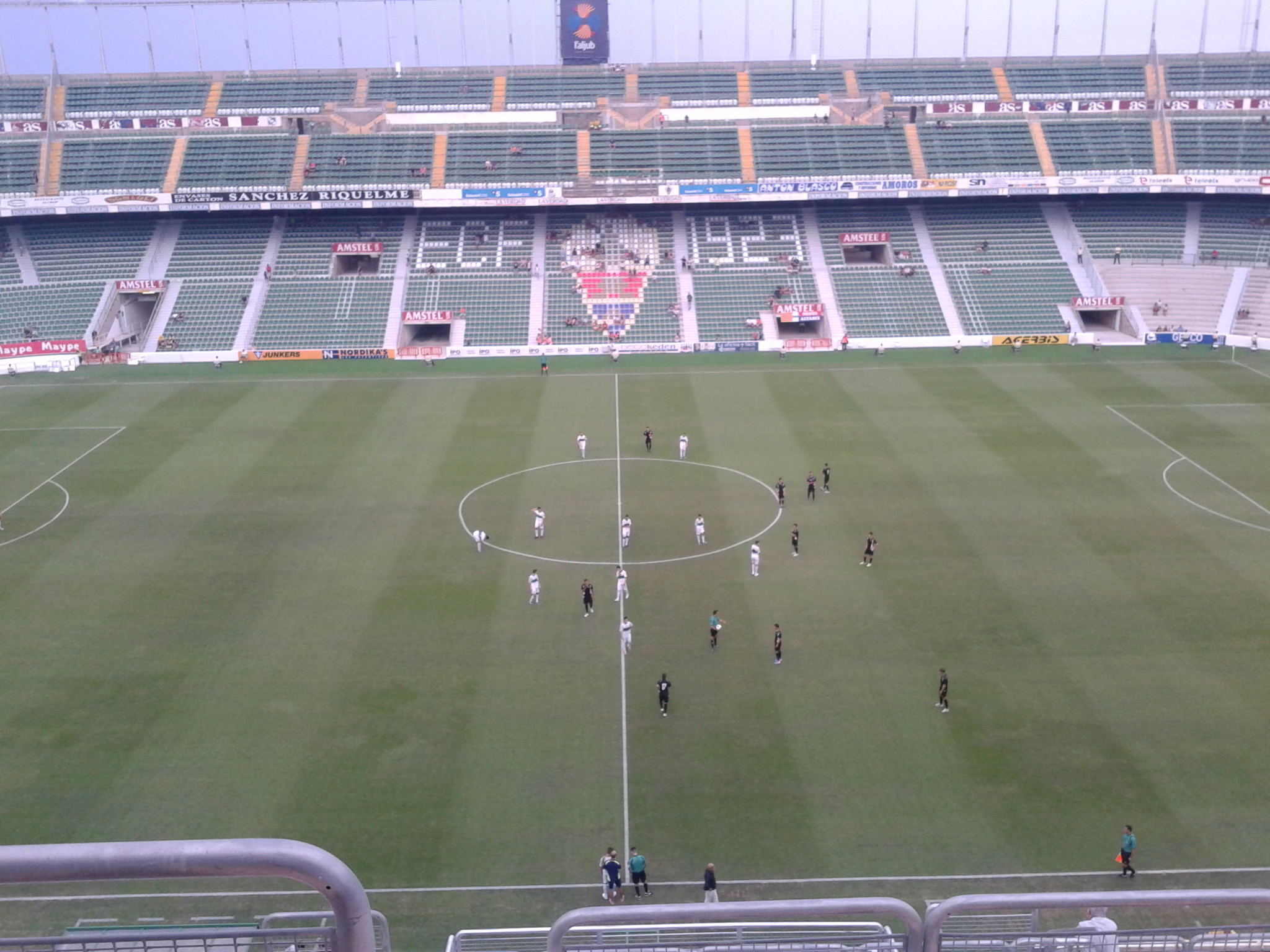

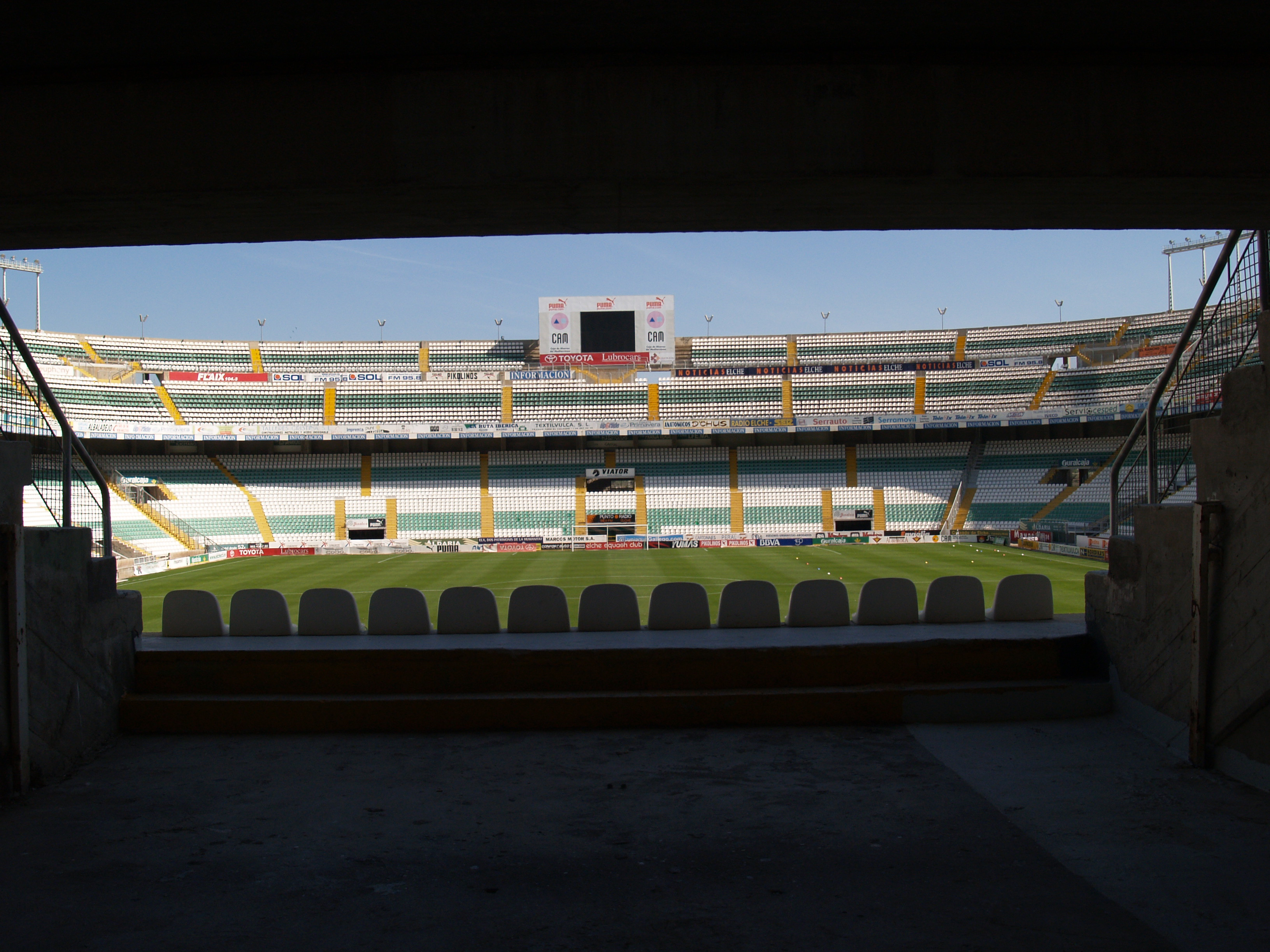

== See also ==
- List of stadiums in Spain
- Lists of stadiums
