= Sándor Sallai =

Hungarian footballer (born 1960)

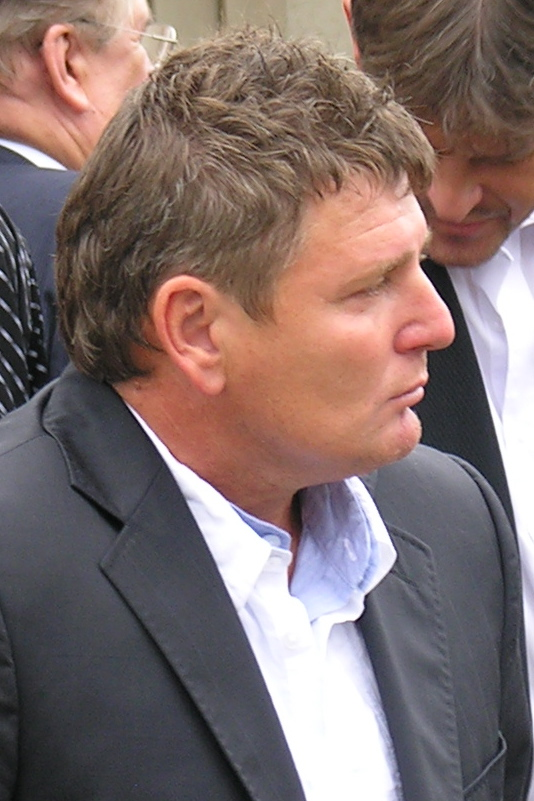
- Sallai in 2011

Personal information
- Full name: Sándor Sallai
- Date of birth: 26 March 1960 (age 66)
- Place of birth: Debrecen, Hungary
- Height: 5 ft 6 1/2 in (1.69 m)
- Position: Defender

Senior career*
Years	Team	Apps	(Gls)
1979–1983	Debrecen	95	(2)
1983–1990	Honvéd	138	(3)
Total		233	(5)

International career
1981–1989	Hungary	55	(1)
- * Club domestic league appearances and goals

Sándor Sallai (born 26 March 1960, Debrecen) is a Hungarian retired professional footballer who played as a defender.

He made his début for the Hungary national team in 1981, and was awarded 55 caps, and scored one goal, up to 1989. Sallai was a participant at the 1982 and 1986 FIFA World Cups where Hungary, on both occasions, failed to progress from the first stage.

== Personal life ==
His nephew is Roland Sallai.
