= Francisco Jovel =

Salvadoran footballer (born 1951)

José Francisco Jovel
Personal information
- Full name: José Francisco Jovel Cruz
- Date of birth: 26 May 1951 (age 75)
- Place of birth: Usulután, El Salvador
- Height: 1.88 m (6 ft 2 in)
- Position: Defender

Youth career
- 1965–1972: Calavera Usulután

Senior career*
Years	Team	Apps	(Gls)
1972–1978	CD Luis Ángel Firpo		
1979–1983	CD Águila		
1984–1987	CD Luis Ángel Firpo		

International career
1976–1985	El Salvador	110	(0)

Managerial career
- 2017–2019: CD Luis Ángel Firpo (sports director)
- 2018: CD Luis Ángel Firpo (interim)
- * Club domestic league appearances and goals

José Francisco Jovel Cruz (born 26 May 1951) is a former professional football player from El Salvador, who represented his country at the 1982 FIFA World Cup in Spain.

== Club career ==
Paco Jovel was born in Usulután, El Salvador. He started playing football with the Calaveras football team in the Salvadoran Second Division when only 14 years old and joined hometown Primera División de Fútbol de El Salvador side Luis Ángel Firpo in 1972. He formed a formidable partnership with the Brazilian Luis Nelson De Moraes but won his only league title during a couple of seasons with Águila, before finishing his career back at Luis Ángel Firpo after spending 15 years at the highest level. He was nicknamed el Káiser because his playing style resembling that of West Germany legend Franz Beckenbauer.

== International career ==
Jovel made his senior debut for El Salvador in 1976 and played for his country in 22 FIFA World Cup qualification matches and all three matches at the 1982 World Cup Finals. In total, he played 110 matches for the Cuscatlecos (including unofficial) matches. Jovel also played for El Salvador at the 1975 Pan American Games.

== Retirement and personal life ==
Jovel works as a social worker in San Miguel. He is married and has three children. His son Carlos Francisco Jovel Navas played for Luis Ángel Firpo.

== Honours ==
- Primera División de Fútbol de El Salvador: 1

1983
