= Sándor Müller =

Hungarian footballer (1948–2024)

Personal information
- Full name: Sándor Müller Smich
- Date of birth: 21 September 1948
- Place of birth: Budapest, Hungary
- Date of death: 3 April 2024 (aged 75)
- Height: 1.81 m (5 ft 11 in)
- Position: Midfielder

Senior career*
Years	Team	Apps	(Gls)
1967	III. Kerületi TVE		
1968–1980	Vasas	310	(55)
1980–1981	Royal Antwerp	31	(0)
1981–1983	Hércules	46	(7)
1983–1984	Vasas	7	(1)
1984–1988	Leopoldstadt FC		
Total		394+	(63+)

International career
1970–1982	Hungary	17	(1)
- * Club domestic league appearances and goals

Sándor Müller Smich (21 September 1948 – 3 April 2024) was a Hungarian professional footballer who played as a midfielder.

== Career ==
Born in Budapest, Müller played club football in Hungary, Belgium, Spain and Austria for III. Kerületi TVE, Vasas, Royal Antwerp, Hércules and Leopoldstadt FC.

At international level, he earned 17 caps for the Hungary national team between 1970 and 1982, representing them at the 1982 FIFA World Cup.

== Death ==
Müller died on 3 April 2024, at the age of 75.
