= Eduardo Hernández (goalkeeper) =

Salvadoran footballer (born 1958)

Personal information
- Full name: Julio Eduardo Hernández Fuentes
- Date of birth: 31 January 1958 (age 68)
- Place of birth: El Salvador
- Position: Goalkeeper

Youth career
- 1975-76: Alianza Reserva

Senior career*
Years	Team	Apps	(Gls)
1976-1977	Alianza		
1977-1983	Santiagueño		
1983-1985	ADET		

International career
	El Salvador	5	(0)
- * Club domestic league appearances and goals

Julio Eduardo Hernández Fuentes (born 31 January 1958) is a retired football goalkeeper from El Salvador who was one of the three non-playing members of his country's squad at the 1982 FIFA World Cup in Spain.

== International career ==
Nicknamed Guayo, Hernández represented El Salvador in 5 FIFA World Cup qualification matches.
