= Győző Martos =

Hungarian footballer (1949-2026)

Personal information
- Date of birth: 15 December 1949
- Place of birth: Budapest, Hungary
- Date of death: 3 September 2026 (aged 76)
- Height: 1.80 m (5 ft 11 in)
- Position: Defender

Youth career
- 1963–1971: Ferencváros

Senior career*
Years	Team	Apps	(Gls)
1971–1979	Ferencváros	202	(8)
1979–1981	Volán FC	60	(0)
1981–1984	Waterschei SV Thor	47	(1)
Total		309	(9)

International career
1977–1983	Hungary	34	(0)
- * Club domestic league appearances and goals

Győző Martos (15 December 1949 – 3 September 2026) was a Hungarian footballer who played as a defender. He participated in the 1978 and 1982 World Cups, in which Hungary was eliminated in the first round on both occasions.

== Club career ==
Martos started in his career in 1971 at Ferencváros, where he managed to reach the final of the Cup Winners' Cup in the 1974–75 season. They were defeated by 3–0 by Dynamo Kiev.

In 1979, he moved to another Budapest side, Volán FC, where he played for two seasons before ending this playing career with Waterschei SV Thor in the Belgian First Division.

== International career ==
Martos represented Hungary in two World Cups, playing in six matches, during his six-year international career.

== Death ==
Martos died on 3 September 2026, at the age of 76.
