= Ferenc Mészáros (footballer, born 1950) =

Hungarian footballer (1950–2023)

Personal information
- Date of birth: 11 April 1950
- Place of birth: Budapest, Hungary
- Date of death: 9 January 2023 (aged 72)
- Height: 1.83 m (6 ft 0 in)
- Position: Goalkeeper

Senior career*
Years	Team	Apps	(Gls)
1968	VM Egyetértés	2	(0)
1969–1981	Vasas SC	252	(0)
1981–1983	Sporting CP	57	(0)
1983–1984	Farense	20	(0)
1984–1986	Győri ETO	45	(0)
1986–1989	Vitória Setúbal	70	(0)
Total		446	(0)

International career
1973–1988	Hungary	29	(0)
- * Club domestic league appearances and goals

Ferenc Mészáros (11 April 1950 – 9 January 2023) was a Hungarian footballer who played as a goalkeeper.

== Career ==
Born in Budapest, Mészáros played club football in Hungary and Portugal for VM Egyetértés, Vasas SC, Sporting CP, Farense, Győri ETO and Vitória Setúbal,

Mészáros earned a total of 29 caps for Hungary, and represented them at the 1978 and 1982 World Cups.
