= Kálmán Mészöly =

Hungarian footballer (1941–2022)

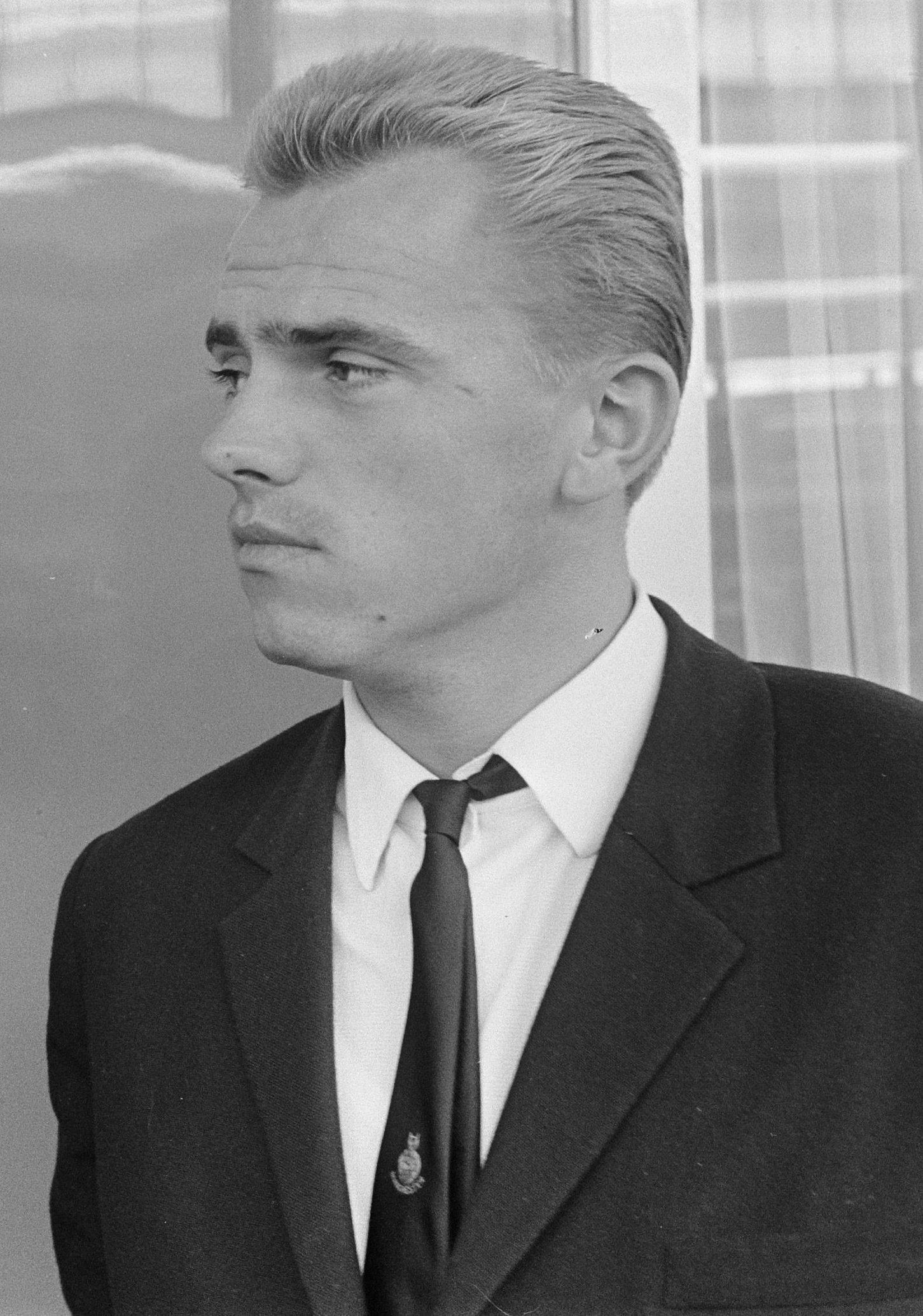
- Mészöly in 1966

Personal information
- Date of birth: 16 July 1941
- Place of birth: Budapest, Hungary
- Date of death: 21 November 2022 (aged 81)
- Place of death: Budapest, Hungary
- Position: Centre-back

Youth career
- 1952–1958: III. Kerületi TTVE

Senior career*
Years	Team	Apps	(Gls)
1959–1972	Vasas SC	279	(32)

International career
1961–1971	Hungary	61	(6)

Managerial career
- 1972–1973: Ganz-MÁVAG SE
- 1974–1976: Budafoki MTE
- 1976–1978: Békéscsabai ESSC
- 1978–1980: Vasas SC
- 1980–1983: Hungary
- 1983–1984: Vasas SC
- 1985: Turkey
- 1985–1986: Fenerbahçe
- 1986: Altay
- 1988–1989: Vasas SC
- 1990–1991: Hungary
- 1991–1992: Al-Ittihad
- 1993–1994: Vasas SC
- 1994–1995: Hungary
- 1997–1998: AEL Limassol
- * Club domestic league appearances and goals

Kálmán Mészöly (16 July 1941 – 21 November 2022) was a Hungarian professional football player and coach. He played his entire career at Vasas SC, where he operated as a centre-back. His nickname was "The Blond Rock".

Mészöly played a total of 61 matches and scored six goals for the Hungary national team. He participated in the 1962 FIFA World Cup, the 1964 European Championship, and the 1966 FIFA World Cup. He helped his team, Vasas, become Hungarian champions in 1961, 1962, 1965 and 1966. He also was part of Hungary's squad for the 1960 Summer Olympics, but he did not play in any matches.

Mészöly played in several World All-Stars games during the 1960s and 1970s. He later had three spells as head coach of the Hungary national football team: 1980–83, 1990–91 and 1994–95. He led Hungary to the 1982 FIFA World Cup.

Mészöly died on 21 November 2022, at the age of 81. His son, Géza Mészöly (born in 1967), is also a former football player and coach.
