= Károly Csapó =

Hungarian footballer

Personal information
- Date of birth: 23 February 1952 (age 74)
- Place of birth: Agyagosszergeny, Hungary
- Height: 1.82 m (6 ft 0 in)
- Position: Midfielder

Youth career
- –1974: FC Sopron

Senior career*
Years	Team	Apps	(Gls)
1974–1982	FC Tatabánya	210	(69)
1982–1983	Toulouse	33	(6)
1983–1986	Grenoble	84	(22)
1986–1990	FC Tatabánya	104	(11)
Total		431	(108)

International career
1974–1982	Hungary	19	(1)

Managerial career
- 1992–1993: FC Tatabánya
- * Club domestic league appearances and goals

Károly Csapó (born 23 February 1952 in Agyagosszergeny) is a Hungarian former professional footballer who played as a midfielder. He participated in the 1978 and 1982 World Cup where Hungary was eliminated in the first round.
