= Lázár Szentes =

Hungarian footballer

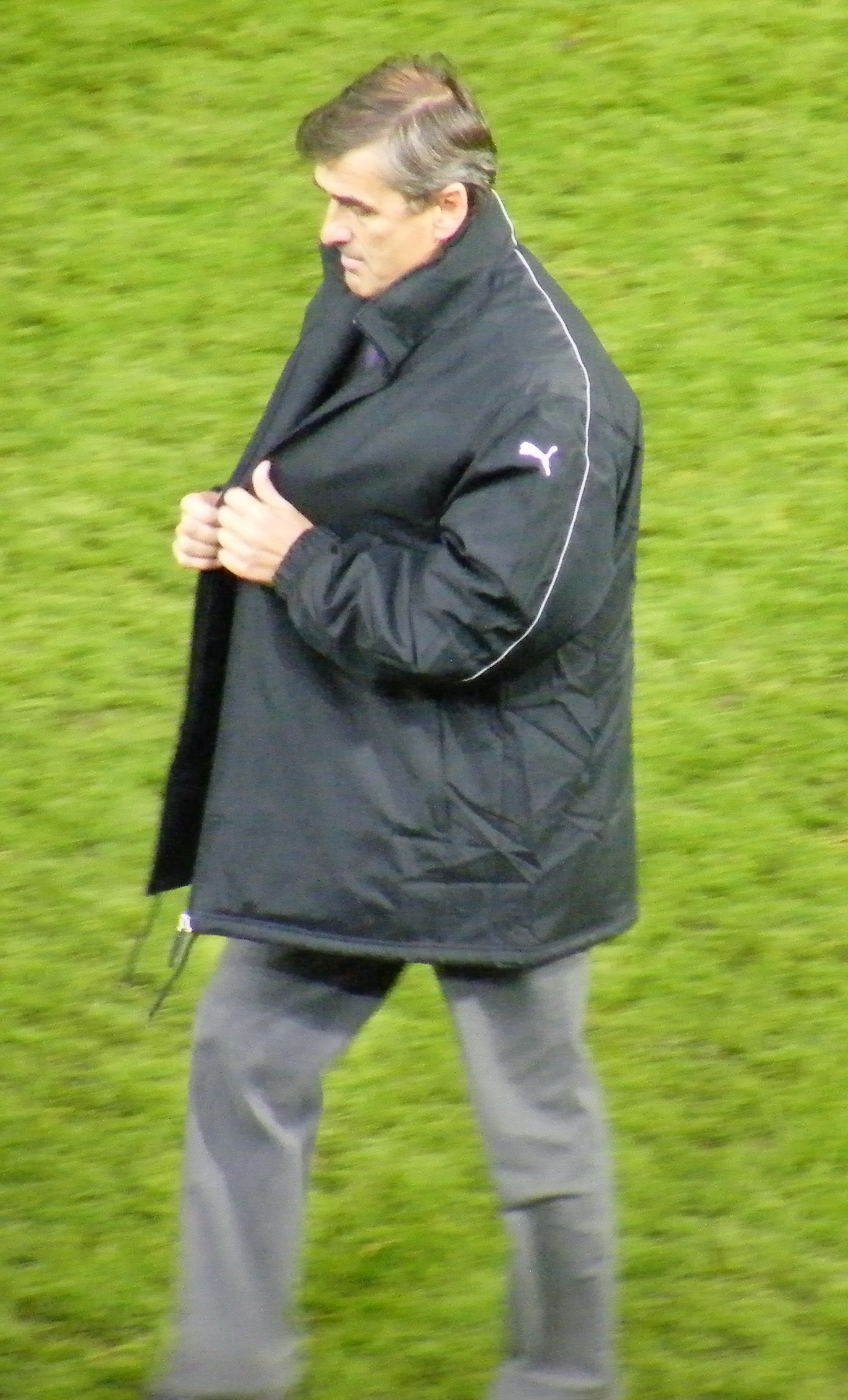

Personal information
- Date of birth: 12 December 1955 (age 70)
- Place of birth: Bonyhád, Hungary
- Height: 1.75 m (5 ft 9 in)
- Position: Striker

Youth career
- Bonyhádi Pannónia

Senior career*
Years	Team	Apps	(Gls)
1973–1976	Szekszárdi Dózsa		
1976–1981	Zalaegerszegi TE		
1981–1987	Győri Rába ETO		
1987–1988	Vitória Setúbal		
1988–1989	Louletano		
1989–1990	Quarteirense		

International career
1982–1983	Hungary	6	(3)

Managerial career
- 1992: Győri Rába ETO
- 1993–1998: ASV Zurndorf
- 1998–2000: Tiszaújvárosi FC
- 2000–2001: Egri FC
- 2001–2002: Haladás
- 2002–2004: Debreceni VSC
- 2005: Lombard Pápa
- 2006: Zalaegerszegi TE
- 2007–2008: Integrál-DAC
- 2008–2009: Újpest FC
- 2009–2010: Nyíregyháza
- 2012–2013: Diósgyőri VTK
- 2014–2015: Haladás
- 2015–2017: Ittihad FC
- 2017–2018: Győri ETO FC
- * Club domestic league appearances and goals

Lázár Szentes (born 12 December 1955) is a former Hungarian football player of the 1970s and 1980s. He appeared at the 1982 FIFA World Cup with the Hungary national team. Between 1982 and 1983 he played 6 games and scored 3 goals for Hungary.

== Sources ==
- Ki kicsoda a magyar sportéletben?, III. kötet (S–Z). Szekszárd, Babits Kiadó, 1995, 147. o., ISBN 963-495-014-0
- NS online profile (in Hungarian)
