= József Varga (footballer, born 1954) =

Hungarian footballer

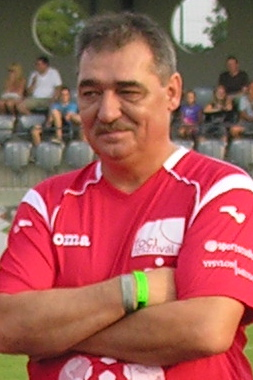

Personal information
- Date of birth: 9 October 1954 (age 72)
- Place of birth: Budapest, Hungary
- Height: 1.80 m (5 ft 11 in)
- Position: Defender

Youth career
- –1973: Budapesti Honvéd

Senior career*
Years	Team	Apps	(Gls)
1973–1985	Budapesti Honvéd	283	(20)
1985–1987	Denizlispor	58	(4)
1987–1988	Újpesti Dózsa	31	(2)
1989–1990	Volán	14	(1)
1990	Reipas Lahti		

International career
1980–1986	Hungary	31	(1)
- * Club domestic league appearances and goals

József Varga (born 9 October 1954) is a retired Hungarian international football player.

== Career ==
Born in Budapest, Varga spent most of his career with Budapesti Honvéd, where he was very popular and nicknamed "Kacsa" (duck). He also spent some time playing abroad, notably with for Turkish first division club Denizlispor. Varga finished his professional career at Újpest FC.

He made his debut for the Hungary national team in 1980, and got 31 caps and 1 goal until 1986. He was a participant at the 1982 and 1986 FIFA World Cups, where Hungary failed to progress from the group stage on both occasions. Varga scored his only international goal against Belgium at the 1982 World Cup.
