= József Tóth (footballer, born 1951) =

Hungarian footballer (1951–2022)

Personal information
- Date of birth: 2 December 1951
- Place of birth: Mosonmagyaróvár, Hungary
- Date of death: 11 August 2022 (aged 70)
- Position: Left-back

Senior career*
Years	Team	Apps	(Gls)
1969–1975	Pécsi Dózsa	132	(3)
1975–1984	Újpesti Dózsa	268	(3)
1984–1986	MTK-VM	56	(0)
Total		456	(6)

International career
1974–1983	Hungary	56	(1)

Managerial career
- 1996–1997: Dorogi FC
- * Club domestic league appearances and goals

József Tóth (2 December 1951 – 11 August 2022) was a Hungarian footballer of the 1970s and 1980s. He made 56 appearances and scored one goal as a left-back for the Hungary national team. He appeared at the 1978 FIFA World Cup and the 1982 FIFA World Cup.

Born in Mosonmagyaróvár, Hungary, he played his club football for Pécsi MSC, Újpesti Dózsa, MTK-VM and IF Kraft.

== General references ==
- Ki kicsoda a magyar sportéletben?, III. kötet (S–Z). Szekszárd, Babits Kiadó, 1995, 233. o., ISBN 963-495-014-0 (in Hungarian)
- Rejtő László–Lukács László–Szepesi György: Felejthetetlen 90 percek (Sportkiadó, 1977) ISBN 963-253-501-4 (in Hungarian)
