= Imre Garaba =

Hungarian football manager and player (born 1958)

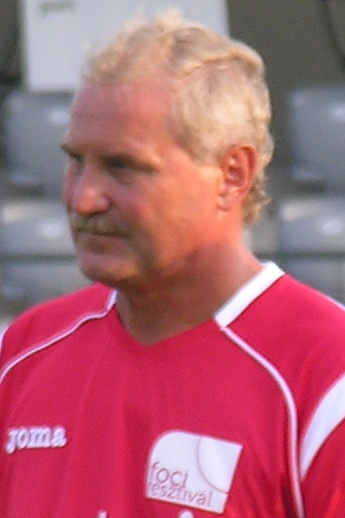
- Garaba in 2011

Personal information
- Full name: Imre Garaba
- Date of birth: 29 July 1958 (age 68)
- Place of birth: Vác, Hungary
- Height: 1.80 m (5 ft 11 in)
- Position: Defender

Senior career*
Years	Team	Apps	(Gls)
1976–1979	Dunakanyar-Vác		
1979–1987	Budapest Honvéd		
1987–1989	Rennes	64	(5)
1989–1992	Charleroi		
1992–1993	BVSC Budapest		

International career
1980–1991	Hungary	82	(3)

Managerial career
- 1993: BVSC Budapest
- 1993–1994: Rákospalotai EAC
- 1994–1995: Gödöllő SC
- 1996: MTK Budapest
- * Club domestic league appearances and goals

Imre Garaba (born 29 July 1958) is a Hungarian retired professional football manager and former player who played as a defender.

He made his debut for the Hungary national team in 1980, and got 82 caps and 3 goals until 1991. He was a participant at the 1982 and 1986 FIFA World Cups, where Hungary on both occasions failed to progress from the group stage.

Imre was very popular among Budapest Honvéd supporters for his combative and heartfelt play, and because, in spite of playing a defender, he scored a number of important goals both for Honvéd and the Hungary national team. He played a key role in having Budapest Honvéd win the Hungarian Championship in 1980, as well as in 1984, 1985 and 1986. He later played with Rennes in France and Belgium's Charleroi, before ending his career back in Hungary with BVSC Budapest, where he also worked as a manager. He has lately not played a role in Hungarian football but remains a popular figure among Honvéd supporters.
