= Gábor Pölöskei =

Hungarian footballer and manager

Personal information
- Full name: Gábor Pölöskei
- Date of birth: 11 October 1960 (age 66)
- Place of birth: Mosonmagyaróvár, Hungary
- Height: 1.85 m (6 ft 1 in)
- Position: Forward

Senior career*
Years	Team	Apps	(Gls)
1978–1981	Győri ETO		
1981–1987	Ferencváros		
1987–1991	MTK Budapest		
1991–1993	SR Delémont		
1993–1994	MTK Budapest		

International career
1980–1987	Hungary	15	(4)

Managerial career
- 2000–2001: MTK Budapest
- 2008–2009: Budapest Honvéd
- * Club domestic league appearances and goals

Gábor Pölöskei (born 11 October 1960) is a retired Hungarian football player and current manager.

He scored two goals for the Hungary national football team in the 1982 FIFA World Cup, one against El Salvador and another against Argentina.

He is the son of former Hungarian footballer Gábor Pölöskei who played for Honved Budapest.
