= 1986 FIFA World Cup Group C =

Football tournament group stage

Group C of the 1986 FIFA World Cup was one of the groups of nations competing at the 1986 FIFA World Cup. The group's first round of matches began on 1 June and its last matches were played on 9 June. Matches were played at the Estadio Nou Camp in León and the Estadio Sergio León Chavez in Irapuato. The Soviet Union topped the group on goal difference over France. Both teams advanced to the second round. Hungary and Canada were the other two teams, the latter making their debut at the World Cup.

== Standings ==
Pos	Team	Pld	W	D	L	GF	GA	GD	Pts	Qualification
1	Soviet Union	3	2	1	0	9	1	+8	5	Advance to knockout stage
2	France	3	2	1	0	5	1	+4	5	Advance to knockout stage
3	Hungary	3	1	0	2	2	9	−7	2	
4	Canada	3	0	0	3	0	5	−5	0	

Source: FIFA

== Matches ==
=== Canada vs France ===
1 June 1986
16:00 CST

Canada	0–1	France
		Papin 79'

Estadio Nou Camp, León
Attendance: 35,748 (Note: The FIFA technical report mistakenly interchanged the attendance data for the 1 June matches.)
Referee: Hernán Silva (Chile)

Canada	France

GK	22	Paul Dolan
DF	2	Bob Lenarduzzi
DF	3	Bruce Wilson (c)
DF	6	Ian Bridge
DF	12	Randy Samuel
MF	4	Randy Ragan
MF	11	Mike Sweeney	(substituted off) 54'
MF	17	David Norman
MF	15	Paul James	(substituted off) 81'
FW	7	Carl Valentine
FW	10	Igor Vrablic
Substitutions:
MF	18	Jamie Lowery	(substituted on) 54'
FW	9	Branko Segota	(substituted on) 81'
Manager:
(England) Tony Waiters

GK	1	Joël Bats
RB	2	Manuel Amoros
CB	6	Maxime Bossis
CB	4	Patrick Battiston
LB	8	Thierry Tusseau
DM	9	Luis Fernández
CM	14	Jean Tigana
CM	12	Alain Giresse
AM	10	Michel Platini (c)
CF	17	Jean-Pierre Papin
CF	18	Dominique Rocheteau	(substituted off) 70'
Substitutions:
FW	19	Yannick Stopyra	(substituted on) 70'
Manager:
(France) Henri Michel

=== Soviet Union vs Hungary ===
2 June 1986
12:00 CST

Soviet Union	6–0	Hungary
Yakovenko 2'; Aleinikov 4'; Belanov 24' (pen.); Yaremchuk 66'; Dajka 73' (o.g.); Rodionov 80'

Estadio Sergio León Chavez, Irapuato
Attendance: 16,500
Referee: Luigi Agnolin (Italy)

Soviet Union	Hungary

GK	1	Rinat Dasayev
DF	2	Volodymyr Bezsonov
DF	5	Anatoliy Demyanenko (c)
DF	10	Oleh Kuznetsov
DF	15	Nikolay Larionov
DF	21	Vasiliy Rats
MF	7	Ivan Yaremchuk
MF	8	Pavel Yakovenko	(substituted off) 72'
MF	9	Aleksandr Zavarov
MF	20	Sergei Aleinikov
FW	19	Igor Belanov	(substituted off) 69'
Substitutions:
FW	14	Sergey Rodionov	(substituted on) 69'
MF	17	Vadym Yevtushenko	(substituted on) 72'
Manager:
(Soviet Union) Valeri Lobanovsky

GK	1	Péter Disztl
DF	2	Sándor Sallai
DF	3	Antal Róth	(substituted off) 13'
DF	5	József Kardos
DF	6	Imre Garaba
DF	14	Zoltán Péter	(substituted off) 62'
MF	8	Antal Nagy (c)
MF	10	Lajos Détári
FW	7	József Kiprich
FW	11	Márton Esterházy
FW	19	György Bognár
Substitutions:
MF	17	Győző Burcsa	(substituted on) 13'
MF	9	László Dajka	(substituted on) 62'
Manager:
(Hungary) György Mezey

=== France vs Soviet Union ===
5 June 1986
12:00 CST

France	1–1	Soviet Union
Fernández 62'		Rats 53'

Estadio Nou Camp, León
Attendance: 36,540
Referee: Romualdo Arppi Filho (Brazil)

France	Soviet Union

GK	1	Joël Bats
RB	3	William Ayache
CB	6	Maxime Bossis
CB	4	Patrick Battiston
LB	2	Manuel Amoros	(yellow card) 43'
DM	9	Luis Fernández	(yellow card) 40'
CM	12	Alain Giresse		(substituted off) 83'
CM	14	Jean Tigana
AM	10	Michel Platini (c)
CF	17	Jean-Pierre Papin		(substituted off) 76'
CF	19	Yannick Stopyra
Substitutions:
FW	16	Bruno Bellone		(substituted on) 76'
MF	15	Philippe Vercruysse		(substituted on) 83'
Manager:
(France) Henri Michel

GK	1	Rinat Dasayev
DF	2	Volodymyr Bezsonov
DF	5	Anatoliy Demyanenko (c)
DF	10	Oleh Kuznetsov
DF	15	Nikolay Larionov
DF	21	Vasiliy Rats	(yellow card) 30'
MF	7	Ivan Yaremchuk
MF	8	Pavel Yakovenko		(substituted off) 68'
MF	9	Aleksandr Zavarov		(substituted off) 58'
MF	20	Sergei Aleinikov
FW	19	Igor Belanov	(yellow card) 33'
Substitutions:
FW	11	Oleh Blokhin		(substituted on) 58'
FW	14	Sergey Rodionov		(substituted on) 68'
Manager:
(Soviet Union) Valeri Lobanovsky

=== Hungary vs Canada ===
6 June 1986
12:00 CST

Hungary	2–0	Canada
Esterházy 2'; Détári 75'

Estadio Sergio León Chavez, Irapuato
Attendance: 13,800
Referee: Jamal Al Sharif (Syria)

Hungary	Canada

GK	18	József Szendrei
DF	2	Sándor Sallai
DF	4	József Varga
DF	5	József Kardos
DF	6	Imre Garaba
MF	17	Győző Burcsa	(substituted off) 28'
MF	8	Antal Nagy (c)	(substituted off) 62'
MF	10	Lajos Détári
FW	7	József Kiprich
FW	11	Márton Esterházy
FW	19	György Bognár
Substitutions:
DF	3	Antal Róth	(substituted on) 28'
MF	9	László Dajka	(substituted on) 62'
Manager:
(Hungary) György Mezey

GK	1	Tino Lettieri
DF	2	Bob Lenarduzzi	(yellow card) 83'
DF	3	Bruce Wilson (c)		(substituted off) 41'
DF	6	Ian Bridge
DF	12	Randy Samuel
MF	4	Randy Ragan
MF	8	Gerry Gray
MF	17	David Norman
MF	15	Paul James		(substituted off) 53'
FW	7	Carl Valentine
FW	10	Igor Vrablic
Substitutions:
MF	11	Mike Sweeney	(yellow card) 52' (yellow-red card) 85'	(substituted on) 41'
FW	9	Branko Segota		(substituted on) 53'
Manager:
(England) Tony Waiters

=== Hungary vs France ===
9 June 1986
12:00 CST

Hungary	0–3	France
		Stopyra 29'; Tigana 62'; Rocheteau 84'

Estadio Nou Camp, León
Attendance: 31,420
Referee: Carlos Silva Valente (Portugal)

Hungary	France

GK	1	Péter Disztl
DF	2	Sándor Sallai
DF	3	Antal Róth
DF	4	József Varga
DF	5	József Kardos
DF	6	Imre Garaba (c)
MF	9	László Dajka
MF	15	Péter Hannich	(substituted off) 46'
MF	10	Lajos Détári
FW	11	Márton Esterházy
MF	20	Kálmán Kovács	(substituted off) 65'
Substitutions:
GK	18	József Szendrei
MF	8	Antal Nagy	(substituted on) 46'
DF	12	József Csuhay
FW	19	György Bognár	(substituted on) 65'
MF	21	Gyula Hajszán
Manager:
(Hungary) György Mezey

GK	1	Joël Bats
RB	3	William Ayache	(yellow card) 41'
CB	6	Maxime Bossis
CB	4	Patrick Battiston
LB	2	Manuel Amoros
DM	9	Luis Fernández
CM	12	Alain Giresse
CM	14	Jean Tigana
AM	10	Michel Platini (c)
CF	17	Jean-Pierre Papin		(substituted off) 61'
CF	19	Yannick Stopyra		(substituted off) 71'
Substitutions:
GK	22	Albert Rust
DF	5	Michel Bibard
MF	11	Jean-Marc Ferreri		(substituted on) 71'
MF	13	Bernard Genghini
FW	18	Dominique Rocheteau	(yellow card) 69'	(substituted on) 61'
Manager:
(France) Henri Michel

=== Soviet Union vs Canada ===
9 June 1986
12:00 CST

Soviet Union	2–0	Canada
Blokhin 58'; Zavarov 74'

Estadio Sergio León Chavez, Irapuato
Attendance: 14,200
Referee: Idrissa Traoré (Mali)

Soviet Union	Canada

GK	16	Viktor Chanov
DF	4	Gennady Morozov
DF	6	Aleksandr Bubnov
DF	10	Oleh Kuznetsov
DF	12	Andriy Bal
MF	17	Vadym Yevtushenko
MF	13	Gennadiy Litovchenko
MF	20	Sergei Aleinikov
FW	18	Oleh Protasov	(substituted off) 57'
FW	14	Sergey Rodionov
FW	11	Oleh Blokhin (c)	(substituted off) 62'
Substitutions:
FW	19	Ihor Belanov	(substituted on) 57'
MF	9	Aleksandr Zavarov	(substituted on) 62'
Manager:
(Soviet Union) Valeri Lobanovsky

GK	1	Tino Lettieri
DF	2	Bob Lenarduzzi
DF	3	Bruce Wilson (c)
DF	6	Ian Bridge
DF	12	Randy Samuel
MF	4	Randy Ragan
MF	8	Gerry Gray	(substituted off) 69'
MF	17	David Norman
MF	15	Paul James	(substituted off) 64'
FW	7	Carl Valentine
FW	14	Dale Mitchell
Substitutions:
FW	9	Branko Segota	(substituted on) 64'
MF	13	George Pakos	(substituted on) 69'
Manager:
(England) Tony Waiters

== See also ==
- Canada at the FIFA World Cup
- France at the FIFA World Cup
- Hungary at the FIFA World Cup
- Soviet Union at the FIFA World Cup
