= Estadio Sergio León Chávez =

Sports venue in Irapuato, Mexico

- El Mundialista "The Mundialista"
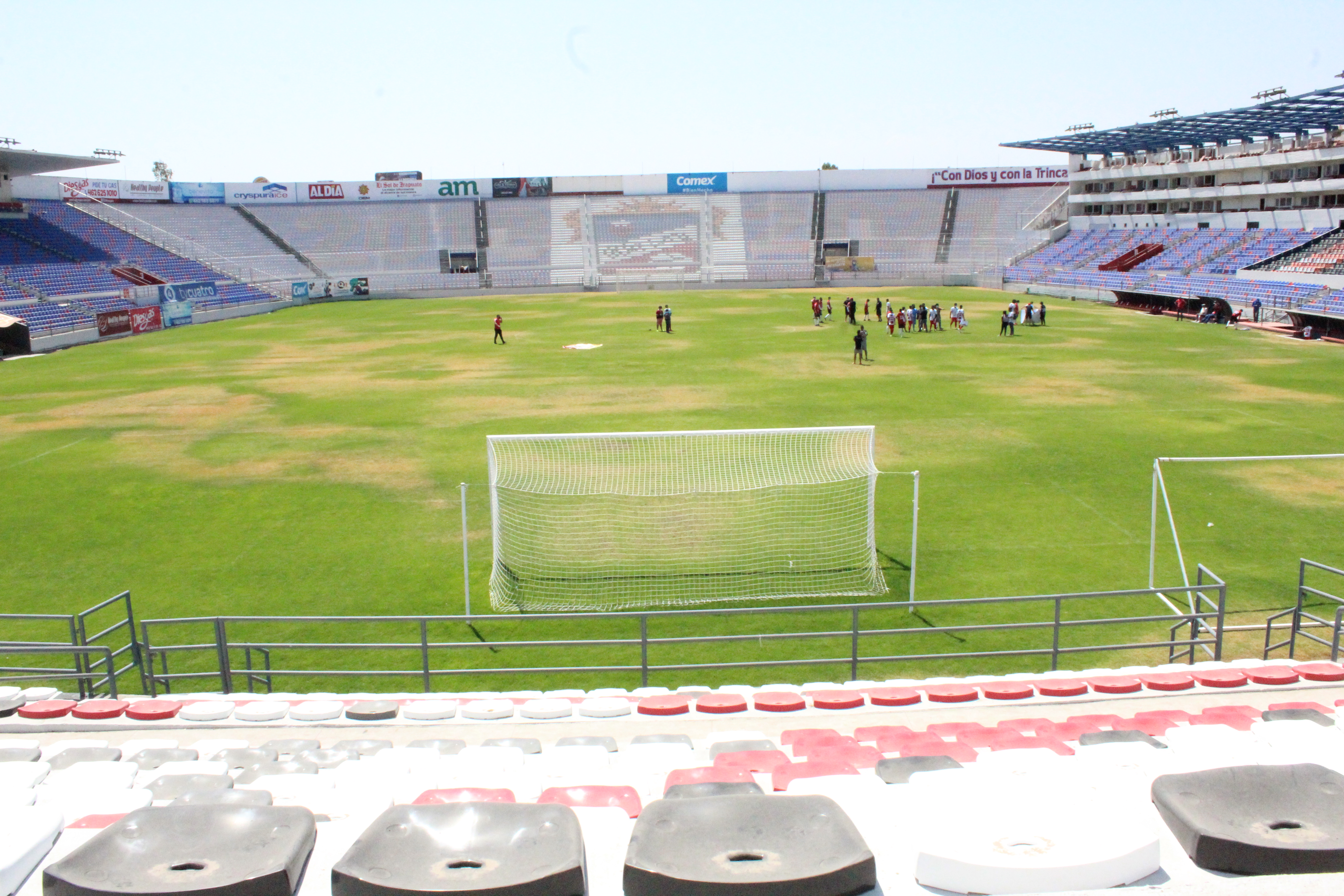
- Sergio Leon Chavez in 2021
- Interactive map of Estadio Sergio León Chávez
- Full name: Estadio Sergio León Chávez
- Former names: Estadio Irapuato (1969–1990)
- Location: Irapuato, Guanajuato, Mexico
- Coordinates: 20.6845°N 101.3563°W
- Owner: Club Irapuato
- Operator: Club Irapuato
- Capacity: 25,000
- Surface: Grass
- Scoreboard: Yes
- Field size: 105 m × 68 m (115 yd × 74 yd)

Construction
- Groundbreaking: 1967
- Built: 1967–1969
- Opened: 23 March 1969
- Renovated: 1985–86
- Expanded: 1985

Tenant
- Irapuato (1969–2021) (2023–)

Estadio Sergio León Chávez is a Multi-purpose stadium in the city of Irapuato.

It is currently used mostly for football matches. The stadium holds 25,000 people. The stadium was built in 1967 and hosted three matches in group C of the FIFA World Cup in 1986.

== History ==
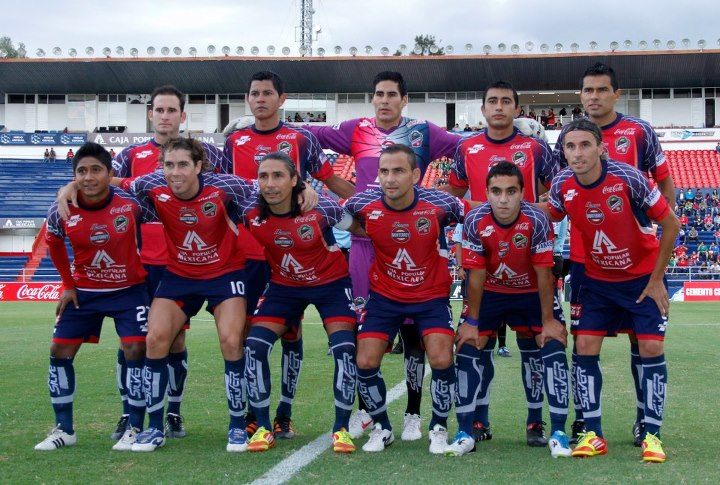
the home team posing for a team picture in the Stadium's ground during the 2012-13 Season

Before the stadium was built Irapuato had the Estadio Revolución which was home to Irapuato FC. The stadium broke ground in 1967 and construction lasted two years. It was founded on 23 May 1969, simply as Estadio Irapuato, gaining its actual name on 4 January 1990, in honour of the former club's president. in October 1968 even before the stadium was completed Irapuato FC invited Spain to play a friendly against them in preparation for the 1968 Summer Olympics its first game played in the stadium, Spain would win the match 1–3. the first person to score in the new stadium was Juan Manuel Asensi from Spain. on 24 May 1970 the Brazil national football team played a friendly vs Irapuato FC in that match the Brazilians beat Irapuato 3–0 with goals from Rivellino, Roberto Miranda and Caju. Pelé was present in that match.

Two international football tournaments have played matches at the Sergio Leon Chavez:

- 1986 FIFA World Cup
- 1983 FIFA World Youth Championship

One Continental football tournament has played matches at the Sergio Leon Chavez:

- 2024 CONCACAF U-20 Championship

== 2024 CONCACAF U-20 Championship ==
The Estadio Sergio León Chávez Hosts Group B & C during the Tournament and two Quarterfinal Matches.

== 1986 FIFA World Cup ==
The Estadio Morelos in Morelia, Michoacán was originally going to be one of the venues for the World Cup. Still, problems in the building of the stadium led to the suspension of the work, The World Cup site was then transferred to the Estadio Sergio León Chávez.

During the 1983 FIFA World Youth Championship Tournament FIFA wanted to see whether Irapuato had what it took to host the FIFA World Cup, In 1985 the stadium was expanded and the capacity went from 16,300 to 33,000.

From 1983 to 1985 several national teams played friendly matches in Irapuato. Also during the 1986 World Cup the Soviets used Irapuato as their training facility.

== 1986 FIFA World Cup Group C ==
2 June 1986	Soviet Union	6–0	Hungary	Estadio Sergio León Chávez, Irapuato
12:00 CST	Yakovenko 2'; Aleinikov 4'; Belanov 24' (pen.); Yaremchuk 66', 75'; Rodionov 80'	Report		Attendance: 16,500; Referee: Luigi Agnolin (Italy)

6 June 1986	Hungary	2–0	Canada	Estadio Sergio León Chávez, Irapuato
12:00 CST	Esterházy 2'; Détári 75'	Report		Attendance: 14,000; Referee: Jamal Al Sharif (Syria)

9 June 1986	Soviet Union	2–0	Canada	Estadio Sergio León Chávez, Irapuato
12:00 CST	Blokhin 58'; Zavarov 74'	Report		Attendance: 14,200; Referee: Idrissa Traoré (Mali)

== 1983 FIFA World Youth Championship ==
8 June 1983; 15:00	Ivory Coast	0–0	Uruguay	Estadio Sergio León Chávez, Irapuato
		(Report)		Attendance: 15,317; Referee: Lee Do-Ha (South Korea)

7 June 1983; 15:00	Czechoslovakia	3–2	China	Estadio Sergio León Chávez, Irapuato
	Dostal 34', 89'; Kula 75'	(Report)	Mai Chao 49'; Li Huayun 56'	Attendance: 15,317; Referee: M. Karim (Bahrain)

9 June 1983; 15:00	China	3–0	Austria	Estadio Sergio León Chávez, Irapuato
	Liu Haiguang 48'; Guo Yijun 79'; Duan Ju 88'	(Report)		Attendance: 15,317; Referee: Christopher Bambridge (Australia)

== Other Internationals Played In Irapuato ==
6 December 1983	Mexico	5–0	Canada	Estadio Sergio León Chávez, Irapuato
	Luis Flores 8', 15'; Jose Alderete 30'; Raúl González 53'; Raul Arias 68'			Referee: Antonio Márquez Ramírez (Mexico)

Mexico:
GK	Arturo Javier Ledesma (substituted off)
DF	Felix Cruz
DF	Rafael Amador
DF	Héctor Manuel Esparza
DF	Raul Gonzalez (substituted off)
MF	Jesus Roca Ruiz
MF	Jose Luis Aldrete
MF	Horacio Rocha (substituted off)
MF	Luis Francisco Garcia
FW	Luis Flores (substituted off)
FW	Luis Gilberto Plascencia
Substitutions:
MF	Alejandro Domínguez	Substituted on
MF	Raul Arias	Substituted on
FW	Francisco Jose Fernandez	Substituted on
GK	Victor Manuel Aguado	Substituted on
Manager:
Bora Milutinović (Socialist Federal Republic of Yugoslavia)

Canada:
GK	Chris Turner
DF	Ken Garraway
DF	Trevor McCallum
DF	Shaun Lowther
DF	Craig Martin
MF	Charlie Falzon
MF	Greg Ion
MF	John Connor
MF	Randy Ragan
FW	George Pakos
FW	Paul James
Substitutions:
Manager:
Tony Waiters (England)

24 January 1984	Mexico	3–0	Venezuela	Estadio Sergio León Chávez, Irapuato
12:00 CST	Javier Aguirre 23'; Mario Diaz 71'; Francisco Chavez 75'			Referee: Marco Antonio Dorantes (Mexico)

Mexico:
GK	Olaf Heredia
DF	Armando Manzo (red card)
DF	Vinicio Bravo (substituted off) 45'
DF	Alfredo Tena
DF	Mario Trejo
MF	Juan Antonio Luna (substituted off) 45'
MF	Javier Aguirre
MF	Armando Manzo
MF	Mario Diaz Perez
FW	Enrique López Zarza (red card)
FW	Luis Gilberto Plascencia (substituted off) 63'
Substitutions:
DF	Francisco Chávez Serrano	(substituted on) 45'
MF	Manuel Negrete	(substituted on) 45'
MF	Javier Hernández	(substituted on) 63'
FW	Luis Flores
Manager:
Bora Milutinović (Socialist Federal Republic of Yugoslavia)

Venezuela:
GK	César Baena
DF	Franco Rizzi
DF	Aranguren
DF	Useche
DF	Icea (substituted off) 45'
MF	Juvencio Betancourt
MF	Alvarez (substituted off) 45'
MF	Gonzalez (substituted off) 45'
MF	Herrera
FW	Asdrúbal Olivares
FW	Bernardo Anor (substituted off) 45'
Substitutions:
DF	Membrilla	(substituted on) 45'
MF	Olivares	(substituted on) 45'
MF	Barco	(substituted on) 45'
FW	Milillo	(substituted on) 45'
Manager:
Walter Roque (Uruguay)

8 December 1985	Hungary	1–0	South Korea	Estadio Sergio León Chávez, Irapuato
16:00 CST	Kálmán Kovács 52'			Attendance: 5,000; Referee: Antonio Márquez Ramírez (Mexico)

HUNGARY:
GK	1	Péter Disztl
DF	2	Sándor Sallai
DF	3	Antal Róth	(substituted off) 46'
DF	6	Imre Garaba
DF		Attila Héredi	(substituted off) 61'
DF	5	József Kardos
MF	8	Antal Nagy (c)
MF	10	Lajos Détári
MF	21	Gyula Hajszán	Substituted off
FW	7	József Kiprich	(substituted off) 67'
FW	19	György Bognár	Substituted off
Substitutions:
FW	20	Kálmán Kovács	Substituted on
FW	9	László Dajka	Substituted on
DF		László Gyimesi	(substituted on) 46'
DF	14	Zoltán Péter	(substituted on) 61'
		Ferenc Mészáros	(substituted on) 67'
Manager:
György Mezey (Hungary)

SOUTH KOREA:
GK	1	Cho Byung-Deuk
DF	2	Park Kyung-Hoon
DF	5	Chung Yong-Hwan
DF	12	Kim Pyung-Seok	(substituted off) 28'
MF	8	Cho Young-Jeung	(substituted off) 47'
MF	18	Kim Sam-Soo	(substituted off) 64'
MF	4	Cho Kwang-Rae
MF	16	Kim Joo-Sung	(substituted off) 73'
MF	13	Noh Soo-Jin	(substituted off) 71'
FW	7	Kim Jong-Boo
FW	10	Park Chang-Sun(c)
Substitutions:
DF	3	Chung Jong-Soo	(substituted on) 28'
DF	15	Yoo Byung-Ok	(substituted on) 47'
FW	6	Lee Tae-Ho	(substituted on) 64'
DF	14	Cho Min-Kook	(substituted on) 71'
FW	11	Byun Byung-Joo	(substituted on) 73'
Manager:
Kim Jung-Nam (South Korea)

== Gallery ==
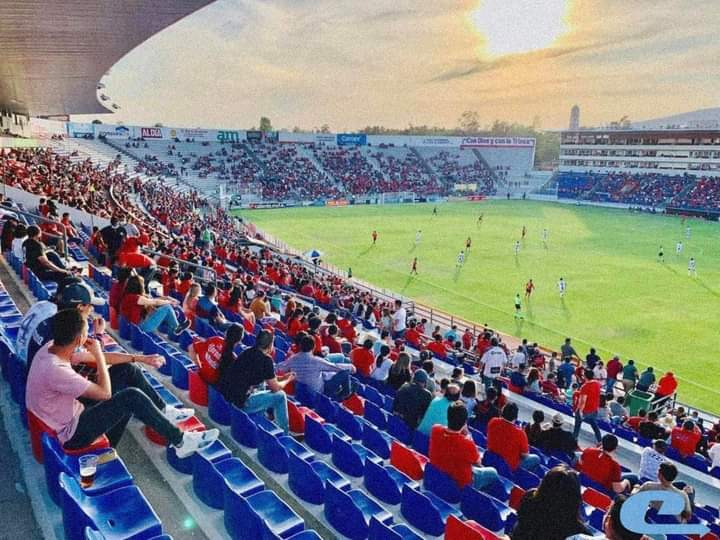
Suite View, 2021

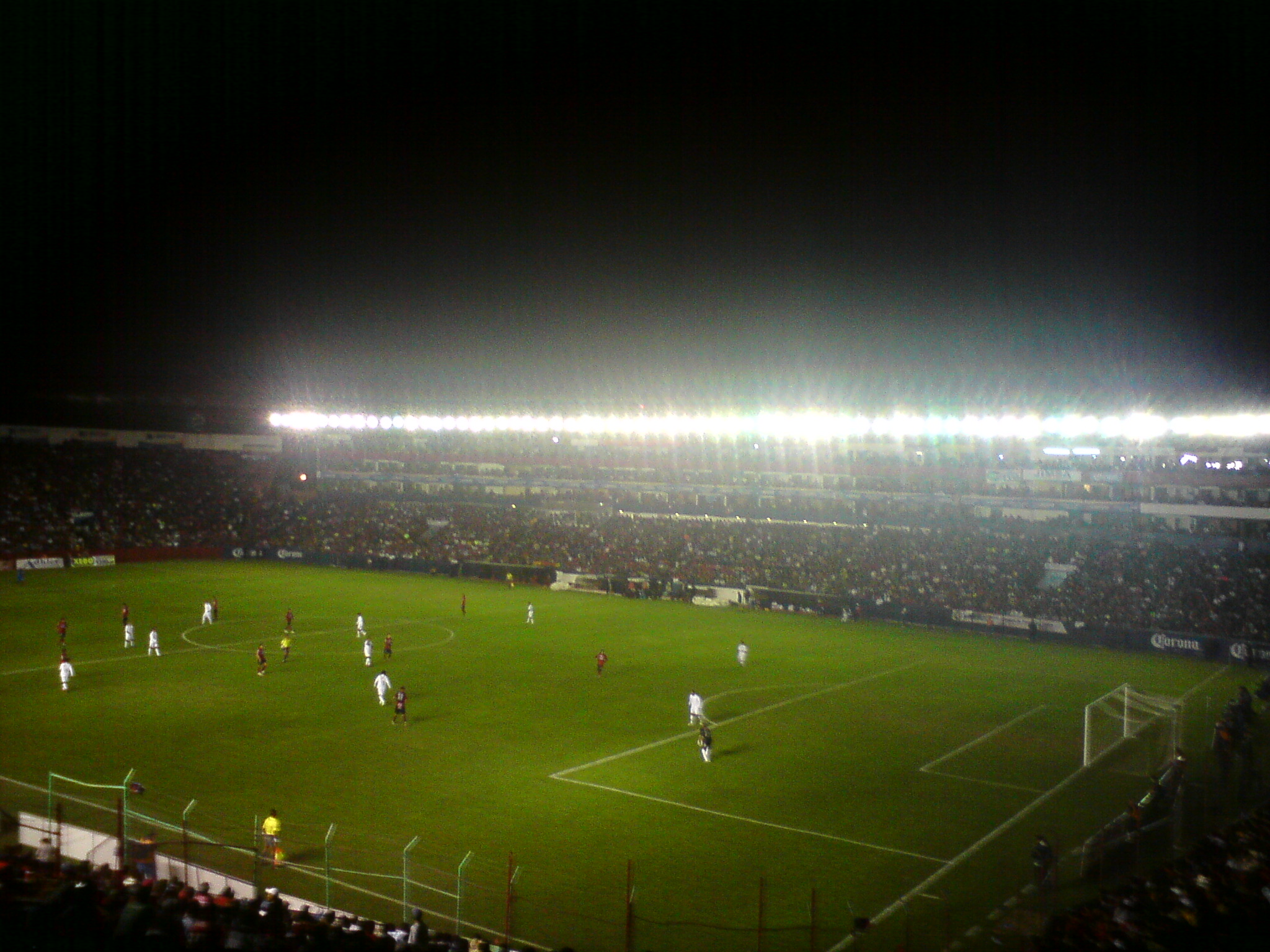
the Stadium in 2009
