= Canada at the FIFA World Cup =

International football delegation

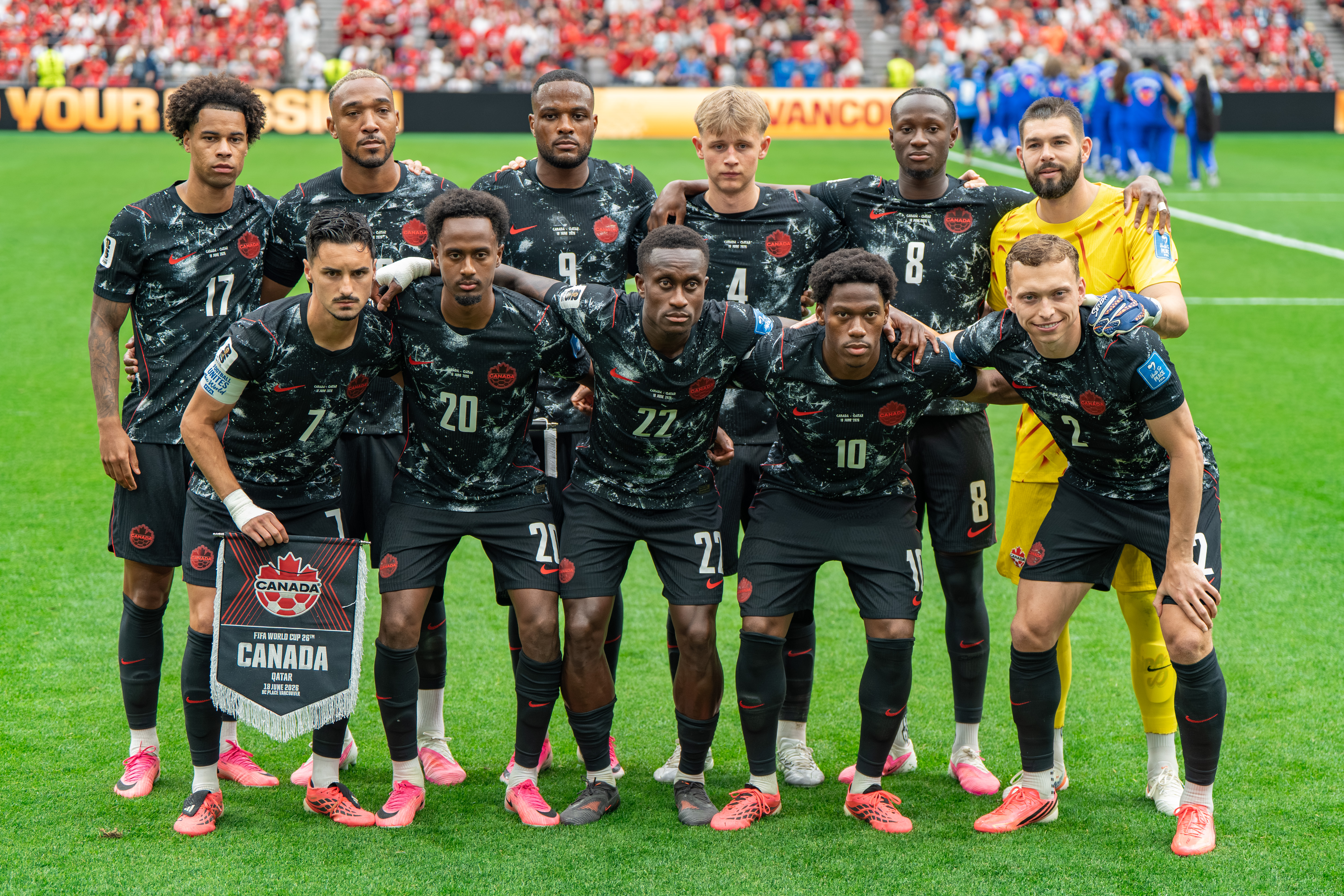
Canada lineup before the 2026 World Cup match against Qatar at BC Place in Vancouver

The Canada men's national soccer team have played at the FIFA World Cup on three occasions: in 1986, 2022, and 2026. For most other editions of the World Cup, Canada has not succeeded in gaining one of the places reserved for the North American CONCACAF teams.

Canada made their World Cup debut in 1986, but were eliminated in the group stage after failing to win a single match. In 2022, Canada qualified for the World Cup for only the second time in history, ending a 36-year drought. Four years later, Canada automatically qualified for the 2026 FIFA World Cup as co-hosts (together with the United States and Mexico). At this World Cup, Canada earned their first-ever group stage point in a 1–1 draw against Bosnia and Herzegovina and their first-ever World Cup match win six days later in a decisive 6–0 win over Qatar, the widest win margin for a CONCACAF team in World Cup history, with Jonathan David scoring the first World Cup hat-trick for a host nation since Geoff Hurst in 1966.

== Record at the FIFA World Cup ==
=== Overall record ===
FIFA World Cup record										Qualification record					
Year	Result	Position	Pld	W	D	L	GF	GA	Squad	Pld	W	D	L	GF	GA
1930 to 1954	Did not enter									Did not enter					
(Sweden) 1958	Did not qualify									4	2	0	2	8	8
(Chile) 1962	Withdrew									Withdrew					
(England) 1966	Did not enter									Did not enter					
(Mexico) 1970	Did not qualify									4	2	1	1	8	3
(West Germany) 1974	Did not qualify									4	1	1	2	6	7
(Argentina) 1978	Did not qualify									10	4	3	3	12	11
(Spain) 1982	Did not qualify									9	2	6	1	10	9
(Mexico) 1986	Group stage	24th	3	0	0	3	0	5	Squad	8	5	3	0	10	4
(Italy) 1990	Did not qualify									2	1	0	1	3	3
(United States) 1994	Did not qualify									14	6	4	4	22	20
(France) 1998	Did not qualify									16	6	4	6	15	21
(South Korea) (Japan) 2002	Did not qualify									8	2	3	3	2	8
(Germany) 2006	Did not qualify									8	3	2	3	12	8
(South Africa) 2010	Did not qualify									8	2	2	4	13	14
(Brazil) 2014	Did not qualify									12	7	3	2	24	11
(Russia) 2018	Did not qualify									10	5	2	3	15	9
(Qatar) 2022	Group stage	31st	3	0	0	3	2	7	Squad	20	14	4	2	54	8
(Canada) (Mexico) (United States) 2026	Round of 16	14th	5	2	1	2	9	6	Squad	Qualified as co-hosts					
(Morocco) (Portugal) (Spain) 2030	To be determined									To be determined					
(Saudi Arabia) 2034	To be determined									To be determined					
Total: 3/23	Round of 16	14th	11	2	1	8	11	18	—	137	62	38	37	215	144

=== By match ===
World Cup	Round	Opponent	Score	Result	Location	Canada scorers
(Mexico) 1986	Group C	France	0–1	L	León	—
(Mexico) 1986	Group C	Hungary	0–2	L	Irapuato	—
(Mexico) 1986	Group C	Soviet Union	0–2	L	Irapuato	—
(Qatar) 2022	Group F	Belgium	0–1	L	Al Rayyan	—
(Qatar) 2022	Group F	Croatia	1–4	L	Al Rayyan	A. Davies
(Qatar) 2022	Group F	Morocco	1–2	L	Doha	N. Aguerd (o.g.)
(Canada) (Mexico) (United States) 2026	Group B	Bosnia and Herzegovina	1–1	D	Toronto	C. Larin
(Canada) (Mexico) (United States) 2026	Group B	Qatar	6–0	W	Vancouver	C. Larin, J. David (3), N. Saliba, M. Manai (o.g.)
(Canada) (Mexico) (United States) 2026	Group B	Switzerland	1–2	L	Vancouver	P. David
(Canada) (Mexico) (United States) 2026	Round of 32	South Africa	1–0	W	Inglewood	S. Eustáquio
(Canada) (Mexico) (United States) 2026	Round of 16	Morocco	0–3	L	Houston	—

== 1986 FIFA World Cup ==
=== Group C ===
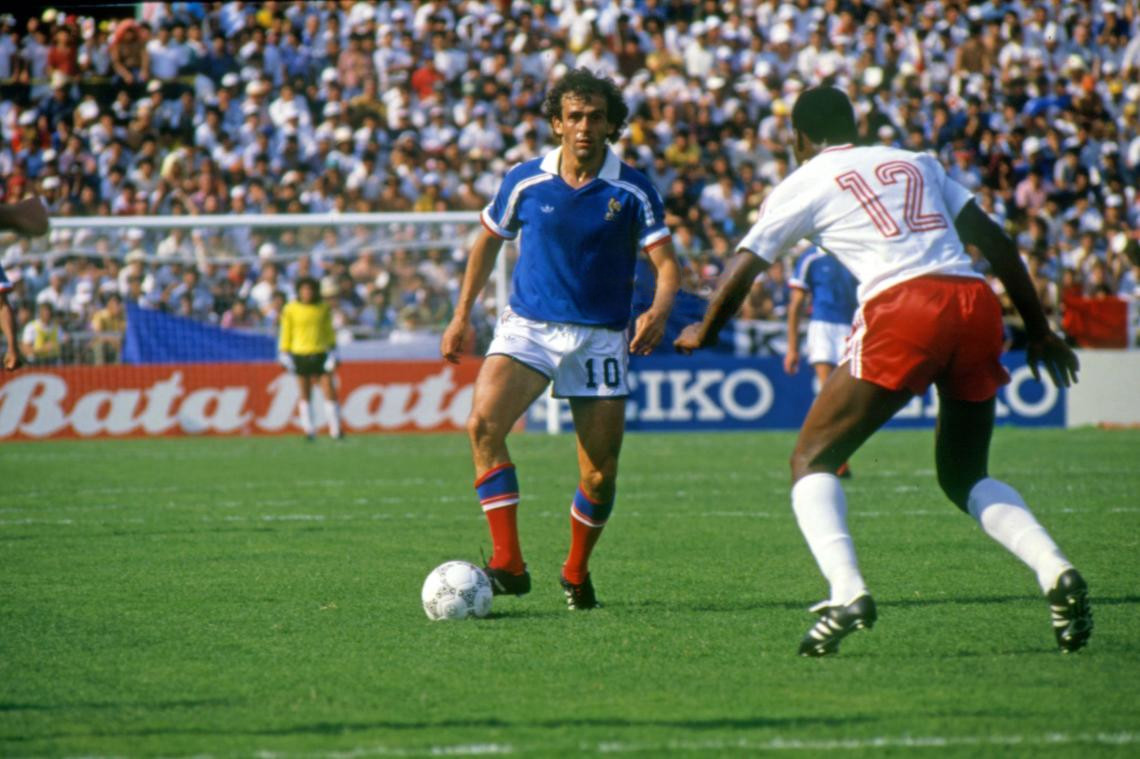
Canada's Randy Samuel (12) facing France's Michel Platini

Pos	Team	Pld	W	D	L	GF	GA	GD	Pts	Qualification
1	Soviet Union	3	2	1	0	9	1	+8	5	Advance to knockout stage
2	France	3	2	1	0	5	1	+4	5	Advance to knockout stage
3	Hungary	3	1	0	2	2	9	−7	2	
4	Canada	3	0	0	3	0	5	−5	0	

Source: FIFA
June 1, 1986
16:00 PM CST

Canada	0–1	France
	Report	Papin 79'

Estadio Nou Camp, León
Attendance: 36,000
Referee: Hernán Silva (Chile)

June 6, 1986
12:00 PM CST

Hungary	2–0	Canada
Esterházy 2'; Détári 75'	Report

Estadio Sergio León Chavez, Irapuato
Attendance: 13,800
Referee: Jamal Al Sharif (Syria)

June 9, 1986
12:00 PM CST

Soviet Union	2–0	Canada
Blokhin 58'; Zavarov 74'	Report

Estadio Sergio León Chavez, Irapuato
Attendance: 14,200
Referee: Idrissa Traoré (Mali)

== 2022 FIFA World Cup ==
=== Group stage ===
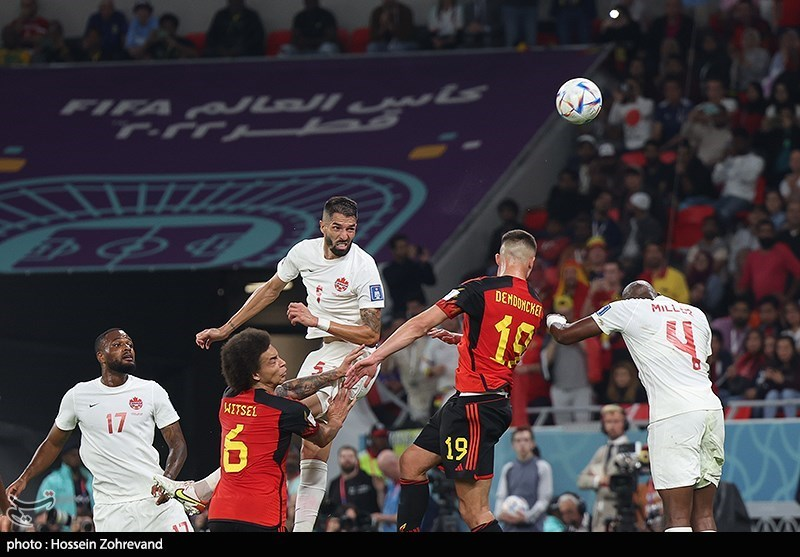
Canada facing Belgium

Pos	Team	Pld	W	D	L	GF	GA	GD	Pts	Qualification
1	Morocco	3	2	1	0	4	1	+3	7	Advanced to knockout stage
2	Croatia	3	1	2	0	4	1	+3	5	Advanced to knockout stage
3	Belgium	3	1	1	1	1	2	−1	4	
4	Canada	3	0	0	3	2	7	−5	0	

Source: FIFA
Rules for classification: Group stage tiebreakers
23 November 2022
22:00

Belgium	1–0	Canada
Batshuayi 44'

Ahmad bin Ali Stadium, Al Rayyan
Attendance: 40,432
Referee: Janny Sikazwe (Zambia)

27 November 2022
19:00

Croatia	4–1	Canada
Kramarić 36', 70'; Livaja 44'; Majer 90+4'		Davies 2'

Khalifa International Stadium, Al Rayyan
Attendance: 44,374
Referee: Andrés Matonte (Uruguay)

1 December 2022
18:00

Canada	1–2	Morocco
Aguerd 40' (o.g.)		Ziyech 4'; En-Nesyri 23'

Al Thumama Stadium, Doha
Attendance: 43,102
Referee: Raphael Claus (Brazil)

== 2026 FIFA World Cup ==
=== Group stage ===
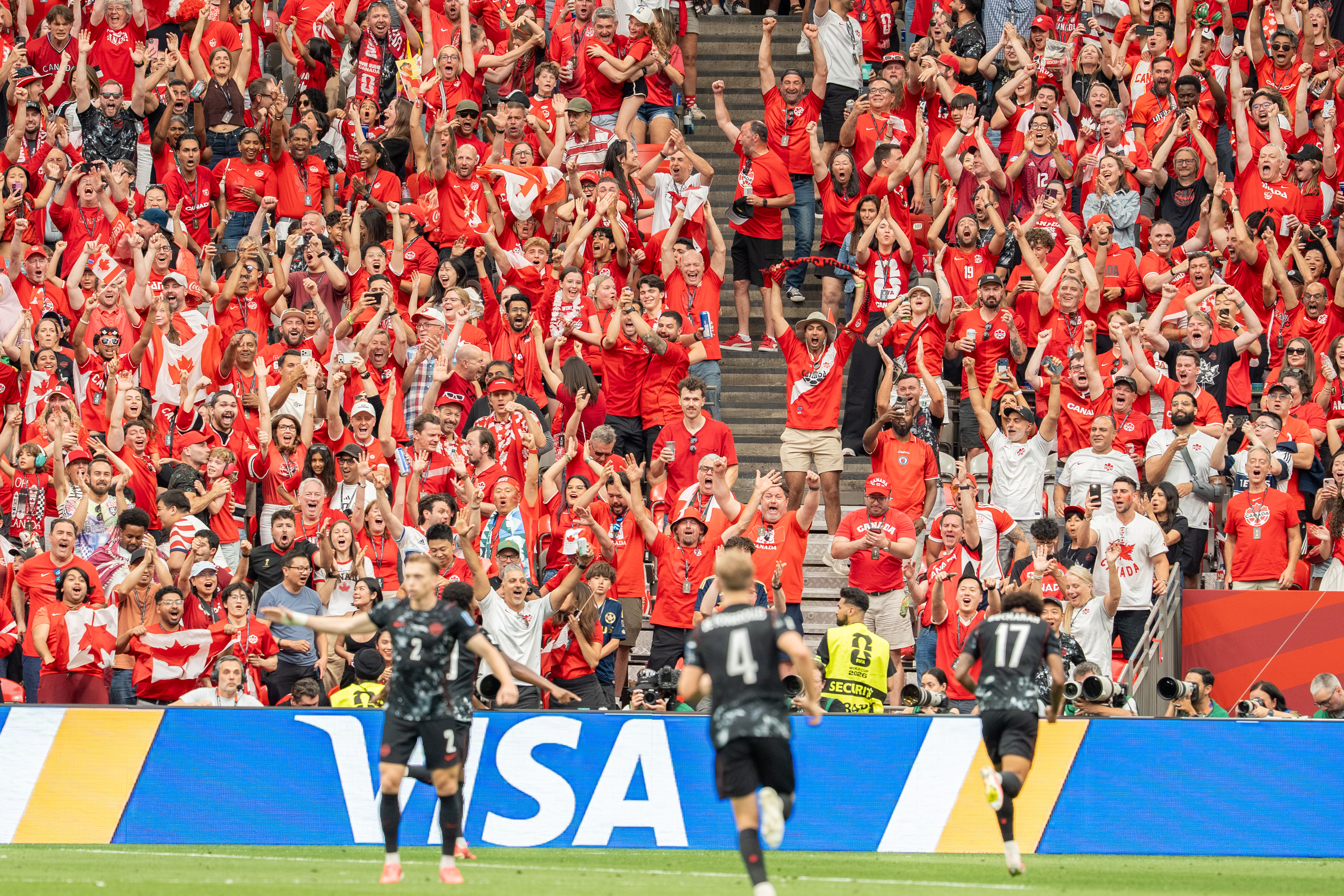
Canada achieved their first-ever win at a FIFA World Cup match at home soil against Qatar

Pos	Team	Pld	W	D	L	GF	GA	GD	Pts	Qualification
1	Switzerland	3	2	1	0	7	3	+4	7	Advance to knockout stage
2	Canada (H)	3	1	1	1	8	3	+5	4 (Note: Tied on head-to-head result (Canada 1–1 Bosnia and Herzegovina). Overall goal difference was used as the tiebreaker.)	Advance to knockout stage
3	Bosnia and Herzegovina	3	1	1	1	5	6	−1	4	Advance to knockout stage
4	Qatar	3	0	1	2	2	10	−8	1	

Source: FIFA
(H) Hosts
Notes:
June 12, 2026
3:00 p.m. UTC−4

Canada	1–1	Bosnia and Herzegovina
Larin 78'	(Note: "Canada vs Bosnia and Herzegovina | First Stage | FIFA World Cup 2026". FIFA. Retrieved June 12, 2026.; "Match Report – Group B – Canada v. Bosnia and Herzegovina". FIFA. June 12, 2026. Retrieved June 12, 2026.; "Post match summary report – Group B – Canada v. Bosnia and Herzegovina". FIFA. June 13, 2026. Retrieved June 28, 2026.)	Lukić 21'

BMO Field, Toronto
Attendance: 43,002
Referee: Facundo Tello (Argentina)

June 18, 2026
3:00 p.m. UTC−7

Canada	6–0	Qatar
Larin 16'; J. David 29', 45+3', 90+2'; Saliba 64'; Manai 75' (o.g.)	(Note: "Canada vs Qatar | First Stage | FIFA World Cup 2026". FIFA. Retrieved June 19, 2026.; "Match Report – Group B – Canada v. Qatar". FIFA. June 19, 2026. Retrieved June 19, 2026.; "Post match summary report – Group B – Canada v. Qatar". FIFA. June 18, 2026. Retrieved June 19, 2026.)

BC Place, Vancouver
Attendance: 52,497
Referee: Cristián Garay (Chile)

June 24, 2026
12:00 p.m. UTC−7

Switzerland	2–1	Canada
Vargas 46'; Manzambi 57'	(Note: "Switzerland vs Canada | First Stage | FIFA World Cup 2026". FIFA. Retrieved June 24, 2026.; "Match Report – Group B – Switzerland v. Canada". FIFA. June 24, 2026. Retrieved June 24, 2026.; "Post match summary report – Group B – Switzerland v. Canada". FIFA. June 25, 2026. Retrieved June 25, 2026.)	P. David 76'

BC Place, Vancouver
Attendance: 52,497
Referee: Ramon Abatti (Brazil)

=== Knockout stage ===
Round of 32

June 28, 2026
12:00 p.m. UTC−7

South Africa	0–1	Canada
	(Note: "South Africa vs Canada | Round of 32 | FIFA World Cup 2026". FIFA. Retrieved June 28, 2026.; "Match Report – Round of 32 – South Africa v. Canada". FIFA. June 28, 2026. Retrieved June 28, 2026.; "Post match summary report – Round of 32 – South Africa v. Canada". FIFA. June 29, 2026. Retrieved June 29, 2026.)	Eustáquio 90+2'

SoFi Stadium, Inglewood
Attendance: 69,237
Referee: João Pinheiro (Portugal)

Round of 16

July 4, 2026
12:00 p.m. UTC−5

Canada	0–3	Morocco
	(Note: "Canada vs Morocco | Round of 16 | FIFA World Cup 2026". FIFA. Retrieved July 4, 2026.; "Match Report – Round of 16 – Canada v. Morocco". FIFA. July 4, 2026. Retrieved July 4, 2026.; "Post match summary report – Round of 16 – Canada v. Morocco". FIFA. July 4, 2026. Retrieved July 6, 2026.)	Ounahi 50', 82'; Rahimi 90+8'

NRG Stadium, Houston
Attendance: 68,777
Referee: Michael Oliver (England)

== Player records ==
=== Most appearances ===
Rank	Player	Matches	World Cups
1	Tajon Buchanan	8	2022 and 2026
1	Jonathan David	8	2022 and 2026
1	Alistair Johnston	8	2022 and 2026
1	Richie Laryea	8	2022 and 2026
5	Stephen Eustáquio	7	2022 and 2026
5	Cyle Larin	7	2022 and 2026
7	Maxime Crépeau	5	2026
7	Luc de Fougerolles	5	2026
7	Ismaël Koné	5	2022 and 2026
7	Tani Oluwaseyi	5	2026
7	Jonathan Osorio	5	2022 and 2026
7	Jacob Shaffelburg	5	2026

=== Goalscorers ===
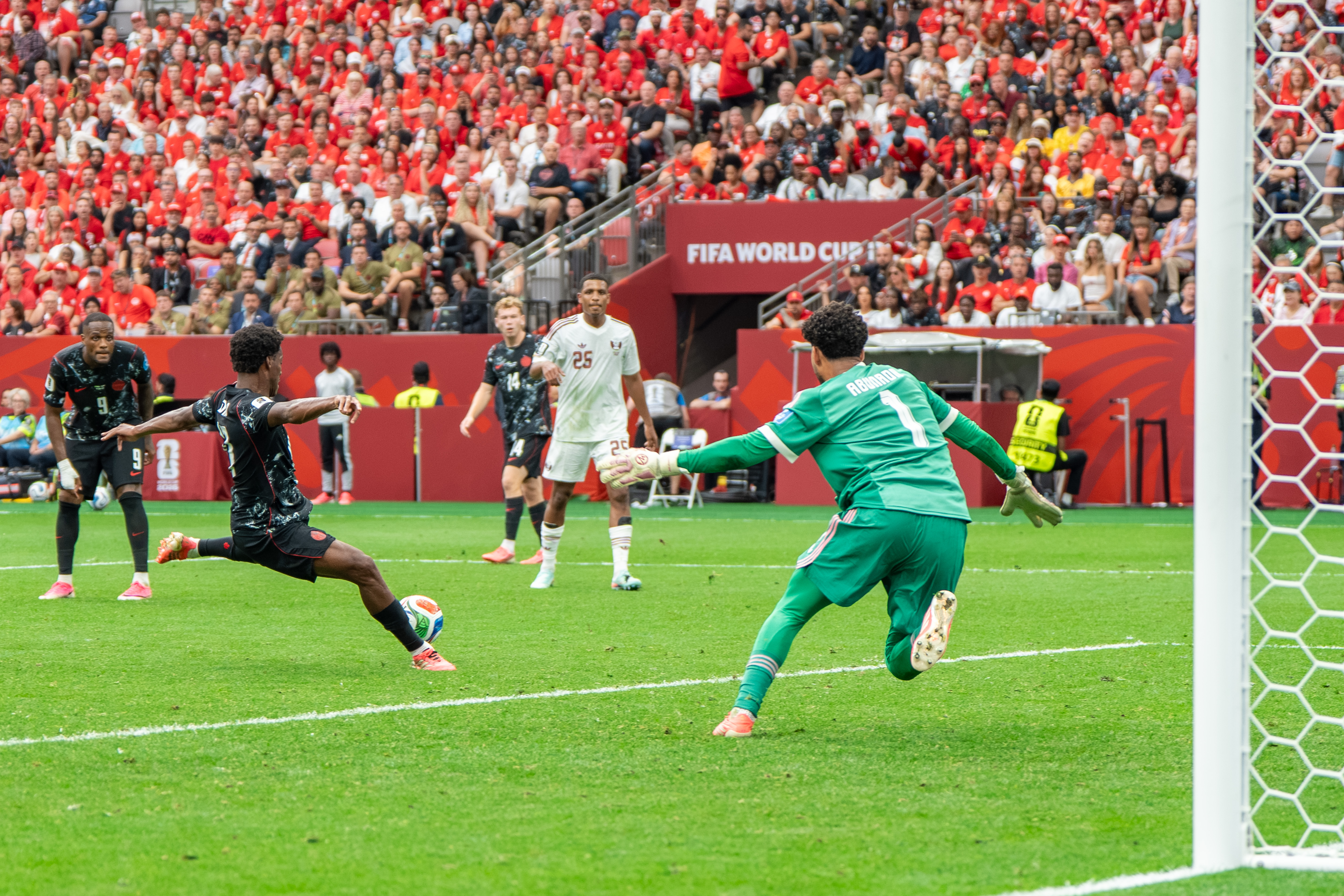
With a hat-trick against Qatar, Jonathan David (seen here shooting to score his third goal) became Canada's top World Cup goalscorer.

On November 27, 2022, Alphonso Davies scored Canada's first-ever FIFA World Cup goal, coming in the second minute of their second group stage match against Croatia in Al Rayyan.

Player	Goals	1986	2022	2026
Jonathan David	3			3
Cyle Larin	2			2
Alphonso Davies	1		1	
Promise David	1			1
Stephen Eustáquio	1			1
Nathan Saliba	1			1
Own goals	2		1	1
Total	11	0	2	9

== Head-to-head record ==
Opponent	Pld	W	D	L	GF	GA	GD	Win %
Belgium	1	0	0	1	0	1	−1	0.00
Bosnia and Herzegovina	1	0	1	0	1	1	+0	0.00
Croatia	1	0	0	1	1	4	−3	0.00
France	1	0	0	1	0	1	−1	0.00
Hungary	1	0	0	1	0	2	−2	0.00
Morocco	2	0	0	2	1	5	−4	0.00
Qatar	1	1	0	0	6	0	+6	100.00
South Africa	1	1	0	0	1	0	+1	100.00
Soviet Union	1	0	0	1	0	2	−2	0.00
Switzerland	1	0	0	1	1	2	−1	0.00
Total	11	2	1	8	11	18	−7	18.18

== See also ==
- Canada at the CONCACAF Gold Cup
- Canada at the Copa América
- North, Central American and Caribbean nations at the FIFA World Cup
