= 2022 FIFA World Cup Group F =

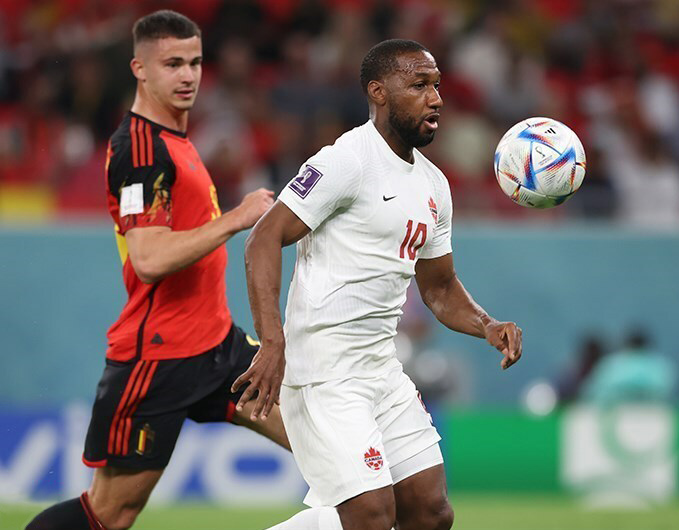
Belgium vs Canada

Matches in Group F of the 2022 FIFA World Cup took place from 23 November to 1 December 2022. The group consisted of Belgium, Canada, Morocco and Croatia. The top two teams, Morocco and Croatia, advanced to the round of 16, and later played against each other again in the match for third place, with Croatia winning 2–1. Morocco advanced to the knockout stage for the first time since 1986. By winning the group, they became the first African team to do so since Nigeria in 1998. Belgium failed to advance out of the group round for the first time, also since 1998.

== Teams ==
Draw position	Team	Pot	Confederation	Method of qualification	Date of qualification	Finals appearance	Last appearance	Previous best performance	FIFA Rankings	
Draw position	Team	Pot	Confederation	Method of qualification	Date of qualification	Finals appearance	Last appearance	Previous best performance	March 2022 (Note: The rankings of March 2022 were used for seeding for the final draw.)	October 2022
F1	Belgium	1	UEFA	UEFA Group E winners	13 November 2021	14th	2018	Third place (2018)	2	2
F2	Canada	4	CONCACAF	CONCACAF third round winners	27 March 2022	2nd	1986	Group stage (1986)	38	41
F3	Morocco	3	CAF	CAF third round winners	29 March 2022	6th	2018	Round of 16 (1986)	24	22
F4	Croatia	2	UEFA	UEFA Group H winners	14 November 2021	6th	2018	Runners-up (2018)	16	12

== Standings ==
Pos	Team	Pld	W	D	L	GF	GA	GD	Pts	Qualification
1	Morocco	3	2	1	0	4	1	+3	7	Advance to knockout stage
2	Croatia	3	1	2	0	4	1	+3	5	Advance to knockout stage
3	Belgium	3	1	1	1	1	2	−1	4	
4	Canada	3	0	0	3	2	7	−5	0	

Source: FIFA
Rules for classification: Group stage tiebreakers

In the round of 16:

- The winners of Group F, Morocco, advanced to play the runners-up of Group E, Spain.
- The runners-up of Group F, Croatia, advanced to play the winners of Group E, Japan.

== Matches ==
All times listed are local, AST (UTC+3).

=== Morocco vs Croatia ===
The teams had previously faced each other once, in a 1996 friendly match that ended in a 2–2 draw.

Although Croatia dominated possession, the match was one of few chances, and ended in a scoreless draw.

The two sides would go on to face off again in the match for third place, making this the second straight World Cup where the match for third place was contested by two teams drawn in the same group (after Belgium and England did so in 2018).

23 November 2022
13:00

Morocco	0–0	Croatia

Al Bayt Stadium, Al Khor
Attendance: 59,407
Referee: Fernando Rapallini (Argentina)

Morocco	Croatia

GK	1	Yassine Bounou
RB	2	Achraf Hakimi
CB	5	Nayef Aguerd
CB	6	Romain Saïss (c)
LB	3	Noussair Mazraoui		(substituted off) 60'
DM	4	Sofyan Amrabat	(yellow card) 78'
CM	8	Azzedine Ounahi		(substituted off) 81'
CM	15	Selim Amallah
RF	7	Hakim Ziyech
CF	19	Youssef En-Nesyri		(substituted off) 81'
LF	17	Sofiane Boufal		(substituted off) 65'
Substitutions:
DF	25	Yahia Attiyat Allah		(substituted on) 60'
FW	16	Abde Ezzalzouli		(substituted on) 65'
FW	9	Abderrazak Hamdallah		(substituted on) 81'
FW	11	Abdelhamid Sabiri		(substituted on) 81'
Manager:
Walid Regragui

GK	1	Dominik Livaković
RB	22	Josip Juranović
CB	6	Dejan Lovren
CB	20	Joško Gvardiol
LB	19	Borna Sosa
DM	11	Marcelo Brozović
CM	10	Luka Modrić (c)
CM	8	Mateo Kovačić	(substituted off) 79'
RF	13	Nikola Vlašić	(substituted off) 46'
CF	9	Andrej Kramarić	(substituted off) 71'
LF	4	Ivan Perišić	(substituted off) 90'
Substitutions:
MF	15	Mario Pašalić	(substituted on) 46'
FW	14	Marko Livaja	(substituted on) 71'
MF	7	Lovro Majer	(substituted on) 79'
FW	18	Mislav Oršić	(substituted on) 90'
Manager:
Zlatko Dalić

Man of the Match:
Luka Modrić (Croatia)

Assistant referees:
Juan Pablo Belatti (Argentina)
Diego Bonfá (Argentina)
Fourth official:
Kevin Ortega (Peru)
Reserve assistant referee:
Karen Díaz Medina (Mexico)
Video assistant referee:
Julio Bascuñán (Chile)
Assistant video assistant referees:
Leodán González (Uruguay)
Nicolás Taran (Uruguay)
Paolo Valeri (Italy)
Stand-by assistant video assistant referee:
Martín Soppi (Uruguay)

=== Belgium vs Canada ===
The teams had faced each other once prior, a 1989 friendly won 2–0 by Belgium. This match made Canada's head coach, Englishman John Herdman, the first manager to coach a team at both the men's and women's FIFA World Cup.

Despite dominating much of proceedings and having 19 attempts on goal, including an early penalty kick taken by Alphonso Davies that was saved by Thibaut Courtois, Canada could not find a way to score, and the sole goal of the match came near the end of the first half from Belgium's Michy Batshuayi, when he converted following a long-range pass upfield from defender Toby Alderweireld.

23 November 2022
22:00

Belgium	1–0	Canada
Batshuayi 44'

Ahmad bin Ali Stadium, Al Rayyan
Attendance: 40,432
Referee: Janny Sikazwe (Zambia)

Belgium	Canada

GK	1	Thibaut Courtois
CB	19	Leander Dendoncker
CB	2	Toby Alderweireld
CB	5	Jan Vertonghen
RM	21	Timothy Castagne
CM	8	Youri Tielemans		(substituted off) 46'
CM	6	Axel Witsel
LM	11	Yannick Carrasco	(yellow card) 9'	(substituted off) 46'
AM	7	Kevin De Bruyne
AM	10	Eden Hazard (c)		(substituted off) 62'
CF	23	Michy Batshuayi		(substituted off) 78'
Substitutions:
MF	18	Amadou Onana	(yellow card) 56'	(substituted on) 46'
MF	15	Thomas Meunier	(yellow card) 54'	(substituted on) 46'
FW	17	Leandro Trossard		(substituted on) 62'
FW	24	Loïs Openda		(substituted on) 78'
Manager:
(Spain) Roberto Martínez

GK	18	Milan Borjan
CB	2	Alistair Johnston	(yellow card) 83'
CB	5	Steven Vitória
CB	4	Kamal Miller
RM	22	Richie Laryea		(substituted off) 74'
CM	13	Atiba Hutchinson (c)		(substituted off) 58'
CM	7	Stephen Eustáquio		(substituted off) 81'
LM	19	Alphonso Davies	(yellow card) 81'
AM	11	Tajon Buchanan		(substituted off) 81'
AM	10	Junior Hoilett		(substituted off) 58'
CF	20	Jonathan David
Substitutions:
FW	17	Cyle Larin		(substituted on) 58'
MF	15	Ismaël Koné		(substituted on) 58'
DF	3	Sam Adekugbe		(substituted on) 74'
MF	23	Liam Millar		(substituted on) 81'
MF	21	Jonathan Osorio		(substituted on) 81'
Manager:
(England) John Herdman

Man of the Match:
Kevin De Bruyne (Belgium)

Assistant referees:
Jerson dos Santos (Angola)
Arsénio Marrengula (Mozambique)
Fourth official:
Yoshimi Yamashita (Japan)
Reserve assistant referee:
Neuza Back (Brazil)
Video assistant referee:
Juan Soto (Venezuela)
Assistant video assistant referees:
Nicolás Gallo (Colombia)
Mokrane Gourari (Algeria)
Massimiliano Irrati (Italy)
Stand-by assistant video assistant referee:
Abdelhak Etchiali (Algeria)

=== Belgium vs Morocco ===
The teams had met in three previous matches, including Belgium's 1–0 group stage victory at the 1994 FIFA World Cup.

Romain Saïss put Morocco in front in the 73rd minute, when he glanced the ball in at close range after a free kick whipped in from the left by Abdelhamid Sabiri deceived Belgian goalkeeper Thibaut Courtois at the near post. Zakaria Aboukhlal made it 2–0 in added time when he finished high into the right corner of the net after a cut-back from Hakim Ziyech on the right.

The match was only Morocco's third victory in World Cup history. The result sparked riots back in Belgium (home to a large ethnic Moroccan community), with resident fires and fireworks being set off.

27 November 2022
16:00

Belgium	0–2	Morocco
		Saïss 73'; Aboukhlal 90+2'

Al Thumama Stadium, Doha
Attendance: 43,738
Referee: César Arturo Ramos (Mexico)

Belgium	Morocco

GK	1	Thibaut Courtois
RB	15	Thomas Meunier		(substituted off) 81'
CB	2	Toby Alderweireld
CB	5	Jan Vertonghen
LB	21	Timothy Castagne
CM	18	Amadou Onana	(yellow card) 29'	(substituted off) 60'
CM	6	Axel Witsel
RW	7	Kevin De Bruyne
AM	10	Eden Hazard (c)		(substituted off) 60'
LW	16	Thorgan Hazard		(substituted off) 75'
CF	23	Michy Batshuayi		(substituted off) 75'
Substitutions:
MF	8	Youri Tielemans		(substituted on) 60'
FW	14	Dries Mertens		(substituted on) 60'
FW	22	Charles De Ketelaere		(substituted on) 75'
FW	17	Leandro Trossard		(substituted on) 75'
FW	9	Romelu Lukaku		(substituted on) 81'
Manager:
(Spain) Roberto Martínez

GK	12	Munir Mohamedi
RB	2	Achraf Hakimi		(substituted off) 68'
CB	5	Nayef Aguerd
CB	6	Romain Saïss (c)
LB	3	Noussair Mazraoui
DM	4	Sofyan Amrabat
CM	8	Azzedine Ounahi		(substituted off) 78'
CM	15	Selim Amallah		(substituted off) 68'
RF	7	Hakim Ziyech
CF	19	Youssef En-Nesyri		(substituted off) 73'
LF	17	Sofiane Boufal		(substituted off) 73'
Substitutions:
FW	11	Abdelhamid Sabiri	(yellow card) 90+5'	(substituted on) 68'
DF	25	Yahia Attiyat Allah		(substituted on) 68'
MF	14	Zakaria Aboukhlal		(substituted on) 73'
FW	9	Abderrazak Hamdallah		(substituted on) 73'
DF	18	Jawad El Yamiq		(substituted on) 78'
Manager:
Walid Regragui

Man of the Match:
Hakim Ziyech (Morocco)

Assistant referees:
Alberto Morín (Mexico)
Miguel Hernández (Mexico)
Fourth official:
Yoshimi Yamashita (Japan)
Reserve assistant referee:
Neuza Back (Brazil)
Video assistant referee:
Fernando Guerrero (Mexico)
Assistant video assistant referees:
Nicolás Gallo (Colombia)
Kathryn Nesbitt (United States)
Armando Villarreal (United States)
Stand-by assistant video assistant referee:
Kyle Atkins (United States)

=== Croatia vs Canada ===
The teams had never met before.

Alphonso Davies scored Canada's first-ever World Cup goal in the second minute, with his header off a cross from Tajon Buchanan on the right giving Canada the lead. His effort was the fastest goal in the tournament at 68 seconds. Andrej Kramarić and Marko Livaja would strike back before half-time for Croatia to put them into 2–1 lead. Kramarić would score again in the second period before Lovro Majer took advantage of a miscontrolled ball by Kamal Miller in the dying moments of the match to complete a 4–1 Croatian victory that sealed Canada's elimination from the tournament. It was also Canada's largest ever defeat in a World Cup match.

The match was marred by xenophobic anti-Serb chants made by a group of Croatian fans against Canadian goalkeeper Milan Borjan, an ethnic Croatian Serb who fled Croatia during the Croatian War of Independence, along with their display of a modified John Deere banner making a reference to Operation Storm, a military operation that ended the war and abolished the separatist proto-state Republic of Serbian Krajina, which resulted in a mass exodus and war crimes against number of Krajina's Serb civilians.

27 November 2022
19:00

Croatia	4–1	Canada
Kramarić 36', 70'; Livaja 44'; Majer 90+4'		Davies 2'

Khalifa International Stadium, Al Rayyan
Attendance: 44,374
Referee: Andrés Matonte (Uruguay)

Croatia	Canada

GK	1	Dominik Livaković
RB	22	Josip Juranović
CB	6	Dejan Lovren	(yellow card) 56'
CB	20	Joško Gvardiol
LB	19	Borna Sosa
DM	11	Marcelo Brozović
CM	10	Luka Modrić (c)	(yellow card) 85'	(substituted off) 86'
CM	8	Mateo Kovačić		(substituted off) 86'
RF	14	Marko Livaja		(substituted off) 60'
CF	9	Andrej Kramarić		(substituted off) 72'
LF	4	Ivan Perišić		(substituted off) 86'
Substitutions:
FW	16	Bruno Petković		(substituted on) 60'
MF	13	Nikola Vlašić		(substituted on) 72'
FW	18	Mislav Oršić		(substituted on) 86'
MF	7	Lovro Majer		(substituted on) 86'
MF	15	Mario Pašalić		(substituted on) 86'
Manager:
Zlatko Dalić

GK	18	Milan Borjan
CB	2	Alistair Johnston
CB	5	Steven Vitória
CB	4	Kamal Miller	(yellow card) 85'
RM	22	Richie Laryea		(substituted off) 62'
CM	13	Atiba Hutchinson (c)		(substituted off) 72'
CM	7	Stephen Eustáquio		(substituted off) 46'
LM	19	Alphonso Davies
RF	11	Tajon Buchanan	(yellow card) 52'
CF	17	Cyle Larin		(substituted off) 46'
LF	20	Jonathan David		(substituted off) 72'
Substitutions:
MF	21	Jonathan Osorio		(substituted on) 46'
MF	15	Ismaël Koné		(substituted on) 46'
MF	10	Junior Hoilett		(substituted on) 62'
FW	9	Lucas Cavallini		(substituted on) 72'
DF	3	Sam Adekugbe		(substituted on) 72'
Manager:
(England) John Herdman

Man of the Match:
Andrej Kramarić (Croatia)

Assistant referees:
Nicolás Taran (Uruguay)
Martín Soppi (Uruguay)
Fourth official:
Kevin Ortega (Peru)
Reserve assistant referee:
Jesús Sánchez (Peru)
Video assistant referee:
Mauro Vigliano (Argentina)
Assistant video assistant referees:
Leodán González (Uruguay)
Gabriel Chade (Argentina)
Julio Bascuñán (Chile)
Stand-by assistant video assistant referee:
Diego Bonfá (Argentina)

=== Croatia vs Belgium ===
The teams had previously faced each other eight times, most recently in 2021, a 1–0 win for Belgium in a friendly.

The first half finished goalless, with the most noticeable incident coming when Croatia was awarded a penalty following a foul by Yannick Carrasco on Andrej Kramarić, before being cancelled due to the VAR deeming Dejan Lovren marginally offside in the buildup to the call. Belgium, needing a victory to avoid elimination unless Canada defeated Morocco by four goals in the concurrent match played, would bring on record goalscorer Romelu Lukaku for the second period, marking his return to action following a spell out due to injury with only a brief cameo in the previous fixture. Lukaku missed several notable chances to score, including a strike that hit the inside of the post, as Belgium was unable to capitalize on their opportunities and succumbed to a 0–0 draw, eliminating them after Morocco defeated Canada 2–1.

1 December 2022
18:00

Croatia	0–0	Belgium

Ahmad bin Ali Stadium, Al Rayyan
Attendance: 43,984
Referee: Anthony Taylor (England)

Croatia	Belgium

GK	1	Dominik Livaković
RB	22	Josip Juranović
CB	6	Dejan Lovren
CB	20	Joško Gvardiol
LB	19	Borna Sosa
DM	11	Marcelo Brozović
CM	10	Luka Modrić (c)
CM	8	Mateo Kovačić	(substituted off) 90+2'
RF	9	Andrej Kramarić	(substituted off) 64'
CF	14	Marko Livaja	(substituted off) 64'
LF	4	Ivan Perišić
Substitutions:
FW	16	Bruno Petković	(substituted on) 64'
MF	15	Mario Pašalić	(substituted on) 64'
MF	7	Lovro Majer	(substituted on) 90+2'
Manager:
Zlatko Dalić

GK	1	Thibaut Courtois
RB	15	Thomas Meunier		(substituted off) 87'
CB	2	Toby Alderweireld
CB	5	Jan Vertonghen
LB	21	Timothy Castagne
CM	19	Leander Dendoncker	(yellow card) 67'	(substituted off) 72'
CM	6	Axel Witsel
RW	7	Kevin De Bruyne (c)
AM	14	Dries Mertens		(substituted off) 46'
LW	11	Yannick Carrasco		(substituted off) 72'
CF	17	Leandro Trossard		(substituted off) 59'
Substitutions:
FW	9	Romelu Lukaku		(substituted on) 46'
MF	16	Thorgan Hazard		(substituted on) 59'
FW	25	Jérémy Doku		(substituted on) 72'
MF	8	Youri Tielemans		(substituted on) 72'
FW	10	Eden Hazard		(substituted on) 87'
Manager:
(Spain) Roberto Martínez

Man of the Match:
Luka Modrić (Croatia)

Assistant referees:
Gary Beswick (England)
Adam Nunn (England)
Fourth official:
István Kovács (Romania)
Reserve assistant referee:
Mihai Artene (Romania)
Video assistant referee:
Marco Fritz (Germany)
Assistant video assistant referees:
Tomasz Kwiatkowski (Poland)
Rafael Foltyn (Germany)
Benoît Millot (France)
Stand-by assistant video assistant referee:
Jan Seidel (Germany)

=== Canada vs Morocco ===
The teams had previously faced each other three times, most recently in 2016, a friendly won 4–0 by Morocco.

Morocco took an early lead through Hakim Ziyech after a misplaced pass by Canada goalkeeper Milan Borjan allowed him to score with a chip over the goalkeeper from outside the penalty area. They doubled their advantage in the 23rd minute with a goal from Youssef En-Nesyri when he ran on to a pass to score with a low finish to the right corner of the net from the right. In the final few minutes of the first half, Canada pulled a goal back when Nayef Aguerd diverted a low cross in from Sam Adekugbe on the left into his own net, marking the first own goal of the tournament as well as the first conceded by Morocco. Although Canada captain Atiba Hutchinson's header from a corner would strike the bar and the goal line in the second half, Morocco held on to win the match 2–1.

Morocco thus finished top of Group F with seven points, reaching the knockout stage for a second time and a first since 1986. Canada, meanwhile, joined hosts Qatar as the only teams to exit the tournament without a single point, and remained winless in their World Cup history, adding on to the three defeats they suffered also in 1986.

1 December 2022
18:00

Canada	1–2	Morocco
Aguerd 40' (o.g.)		Ziyech 4'; En-Nesyri 23'

Al Thumama Stadium, Doha
Attendance: 43,102
Referee: Raphael Claus (Brazil)

Canada	Morocco

GK	18	Milan Borjan (c)
RB	2	Alistair Johnston
CB	5	Steven Vitória	(yellow card) 84'
CB	4	Kamal Miller
LB	3	Sam Adekugbe	(yellow card) 45+2'	(substituted off) 60'
RM	19	Alphonso Davies
CM	21	Jonathan Osorio	(yellow card) 26'	(substituted off) 65'
CM	14	Mark-Anthony Kaye		(substituted off) 60'
LM	11	Tajon Buchanan
SS	10	Junior Hoilett	(yellow card) 7'	(substituted off) 76'
CF	17	Cyle Larin		(substituted off) 60'
Substitutions:
FW	20	Jonathan David		(substituted on) 60'
MF	13	Atiba Hutchinson		(substituted on) 60'
MF	15	Ismaël Koné		(substituted on) 60'
DF	22	Richie Laryea		(substituted on) 65'
MF	24	David Wotherspoon		(substituted on) 76'
Manager:
(England) John Herdman

GK	1	Yassine Bounou
RB	2	Achraf Hakimi	(substituted off) 85'
CB	5	Nayef Aguerd
CB	6	Romain Saïss (c)
LB	3	Noussair Mazraoui
DM	4	Sofyan Amrabat
CM	8	Azzedine Ounahi	(substituted off) 76'
CM	11	Abdelhamid Sabiri	(substituted off) 65'
RF	7	Hakim Ziyech	(substituted off) 76'
CF	19	Youssef En-Nesyri
LF	17	Sofiane Boufal	(substituted off) 65'
Substitutions:
MF	14	Zakaria Aboukhlal	(substituted on) 65'
MF	15	Selim Amallah	(substituted on) 65'
FW	9	Abderrazak Hamdallah	(substituted on) 76'
DF	18	Jawad El Yamiq	(substituted on) 76'
MF	26	Yahya Jabrane	(substituted on) 85'
Manager:
Walid Regragui

Man of the Match:
Achraf Hakimi (Morocco)

Assistant referees:
Rodrigo Figueiredo (Brazil)
Danilo Simon Manis (Brazil)
Fourth official:
Yoshimi Yamashita (Japan)
Reserve assistant referee:
Michael Orué (Peru)
Video assistant referee:
Julio Bascuñán (Chile)
Assistant video assistant referees:
Juan Martínez Munuera (Spain)
Roberto Díaz Pérez del Palomar (Spain)
Leodán González (Uruguay)
Stand-by assistant video assistant referee:
Pau Cebrián Devís (Spain)

== Discipline ==
Fair play points would have been used as tiebreakers if teams' overall and head-to-head records were tied. These were calculated based on yellow and red cards received in all group matches as follows:

- first yellow card: −1 point;
- indirect red card (second yellow card): −3 points;
- direct red card: −4 points;
- yellow card and direct red card: −5 points;

Only one of the above deductions was applied to a player in a single match.

Team	Match 1				Match 2				Match 3				Points
Team	Booked	(yellow card) (yellow-red card)	Sent off (straight red)	(yellow card) (red card)	Booked	(yellow card) (yellow-red card)	Sent off (straight red)	(yellow card) (red card)	Booked	(yellow card) (yellow-red card)	Sent off (straight red)	(yellow card) (red card)	Points
Croatia					2								−2
Morocco	1				1								−2
Belgium	3				1				1				−5
Canada	2				2				4				−8

== See also ==
- Belgium at the FIFA World Cup
- Canada at the FIFA World Cup
- Croatia at the FIFA World Cup
- Morocco at the FIFA World Cup
