= Zoltán Péter =

Hungarian footballer

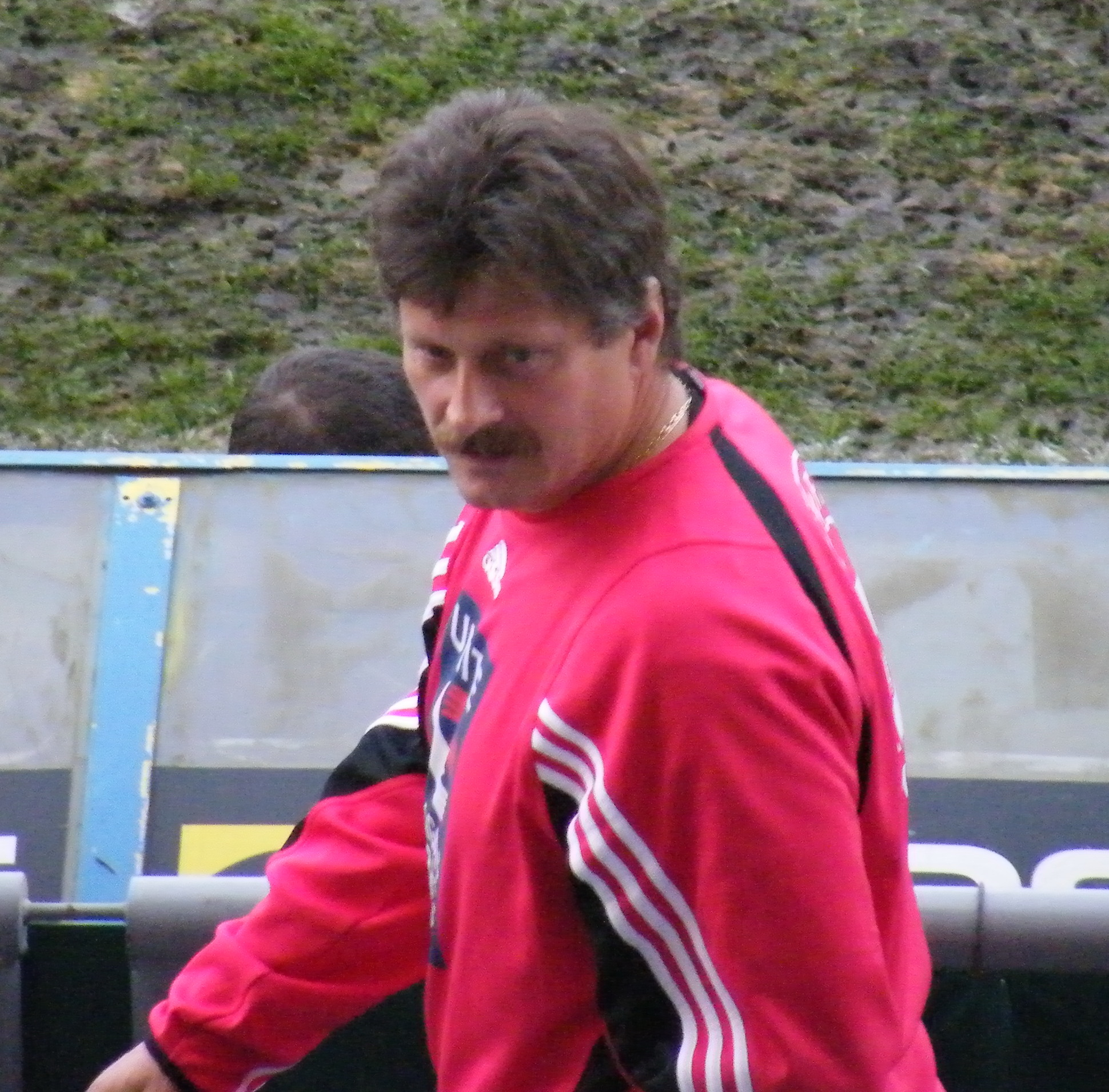

Personal information
- Date of birth: 23 March 1958 (age 68)
- Place of birth: Zalaistvánd, Hungary
- Height: 1.86 m (6 ft 1 in)
- Position: Defender

Senior career*
Years	Team	Apps	(Gls)
1977–1987	Zalaegerszegi		
1987–1989	First Vienna		

International career
1979–1987	Hungary	26	(3)
- * Club domestic league appearances and goals

Zoltán Péter (born 23 March 1958 in Zalaistvánd, Hungary) is a retired Hungarian football defender who played for Zalaegerszegi and First Vienna. He also represented Hungary in the 1986 FIFA World Cup.
