= József Szendrei =

Hungarian footballer (born 1954)

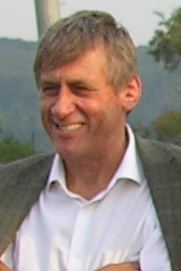
- Szendrei in 2011

Personal information
- Full name: József Szendrei
- Date of birth: 25 April 1954 (age 72)
- Place of birth: Karcag, Hungary

International career
Years	Team	Apps	(Gls)
	Hungary	10	(0)

József Szendrei (born 25 April 1954 in Karcag) is a Hungarian former football goalkeeper.

He is most famous for playing for the Hungary national team at the 1986 FIFA World Cup in Mexico, where Hungary failed to progress beyond the group stage. Szendrei was a player in Újpesti Dózsa, CD Málaga and Cádiz CF.
