= Armando Manzo =

Mexican footballer (born 1958)

Personal information
- Full name: Armando Manzo Ponce
- Date of birth: 16 October 1958 (age 68)
- Place of birth: Mexico City, Mexico
- Height: 1.75 m (5 ft 9 in)
- Position: Defender

Senior career*
Years	Team	Apps	(Gls)
1978–1979	Tampico Madero	26	(0)
1979–1987	Club América	195	(7)
1987–1988	Club Necaxa	31	(0)
1988–1989	Cobras de Ciudad Juárez	15	(0)
1989–1991	Monterrey	42	(0)
Total		309	(7)

International career^{‡}
1980–1986	Mexico	38	(1)
- * Club domestic league appearances and goals as of 4 January 2011 ‡ National team caps and goals as of 4 January 2011

Armando Manzo Ponce (born 16 October 1958) is a Mexican former professional footballer who played as a defender.
