= Zalaistvánd =

- Village
- Flag Coat of arms

- Location of Zalaistvánd
- Coordinates: 46.918039°N 16.976989°E
- Country: Hungary
- Region: Western Transdanubia
- County: Zala
- District: Zalaegerszeg

Area
  - Total: 10.8 km^{2} (4.2 sq mi)

Population (1 January 2026)
  - Total: 347
  - Density: 32.1/km^{2} (83.2/sq mi)
- Time zone: UTC+1 (CET)
  - Summer (DST): UTC+2 (CEST)
- Postal code: 8932
- Area code: (+36) 92
- Website: zalaistvand.hu

Zalaistvánd is a village in Zala County, Hungary.
