= Pavlo Yakovenko =

Ukrainian footballer (born 1964)

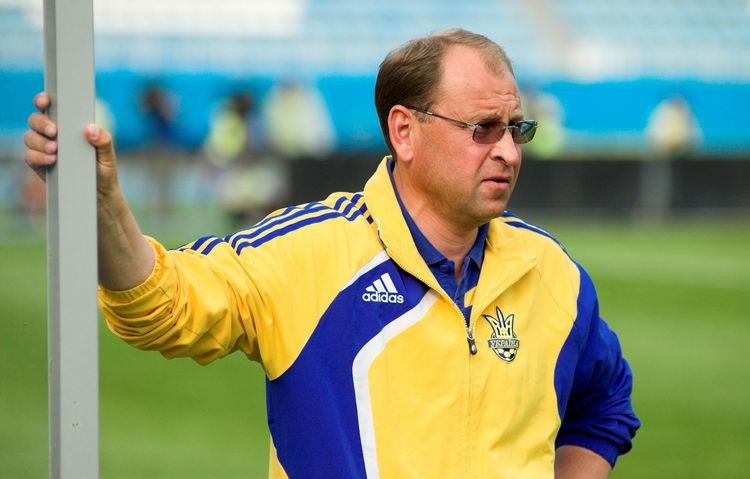

Personal information
- Full name: Pavlo Oleksandrovych Yakovenko
- Date of birth: 19 December 1964 (age 61)
- Place of birth: Nikopol, Ukrainian SSR, Soviet Union
- Height: 1.80 m (5 ft 11 in)
- Position: Midfielder

Team information
- Current team: Obolon Kyiv (manager)

Senior career*
| Years | Team | Apps | (Gls) |
| 1981–1982 | Metalist Kharkiv | 4 | (0) |
| 1982–1993 | Dynamo Kyiv | 161 | (5) |
| 1993–1994 | Sochaux | 6 | (1) |
| Total | | 169 | (6) |

International career
| 1986–1990 | USSR | 19 | (1) |
| 1983 | Ukrainian SSR | | |

Managerial career
- 1994–1995: Metalurh Nikopol
- 1996–1997: Uralan Elista
- 1999: Uralan Elista
- 2001–2002: Borysfen-2 Boryspil
- 2002: Ukraine U19
- 2002–2004: Ukraine U21 (joint with Hennadiy Lytovchenko)
- 2004–2005: Khimki
- 2006–2007: Kuban Krasnodar
- 2007: Rostov
- 2008–2012: Ukraine U21
- 2020–2021: Obolon Kyiv
Medal record
Men's football
Representing Soviet Union
UEFA European U-19 Championships
| Bronze medal – third place | 1982 Finland |
- * Club domestic league appearances and goals

Pavlo Oleksandrovych Yakovenko (Ukrainian: Павло Олександрович Яковенко; born 19 December 1964) is a Ukrainian football manager and retired footballer who played as a midfielder. He represented the USSR national team at international level.

== Playing career ==
Yakovenko was born in Nikopol, Ukrainian SSR. His superb build-up play during the mid-1980s made him the starting player for both Dynamo Kyiv and the USSR national team during their respective successful campaigns of winning the UEFA Cup Winners' Cup and advancing to the top 16 in the 1986 FIFA World Cup. However, recurrent injuries had limited Yakovenko's playing time after 1987 and Yakovenko never returned to his earlier form, becoming a bench player at best.

In 1983, Yakovenko took part in the Summer Spartakiad of the Peoples of the USSR in the team of Ukrainian SSR.

== Coaching career ==
Yakovenko is a trusted Ukrainian coach who headed the Ukraine under-21 team on several occasions as well as other teams representing the country on the international arena. Yakovenko also coached several teams from the southern regions of the neighbouring Russian Federation such as Kuban Krasnodar and FC Rostov.

== Personal life ==
He is the father of the Ukrainian footballers Oleksandr Yakovenko and Yuriy Yakovenko.

== Career statistics ==
As of 19 June 2012

USR national team
| Year | Apps | Goals |
|---|---|---|
| 1986 | 7 | 1 |
| 1987 | 7 | 0 |
| 1988 | 4 | 0 |
| 1990 | 1 | 0 |

As of 19 June 2012

| # | Date | Venue | Opponent | Score | Result | Competition |
|---|---|---|---|---|---|---|
| 1. | 2 June 1986 | Estadio Sergio León Chavez, Irapuato, Mexico | Hungary | 1-0 | 6-0 | 1986 FIFA World Cup |

== Honours ==
- Ballon d'Or: 21st 1986
