= Antal Nagy (footballer, born 1956) =

Hungarian footballer

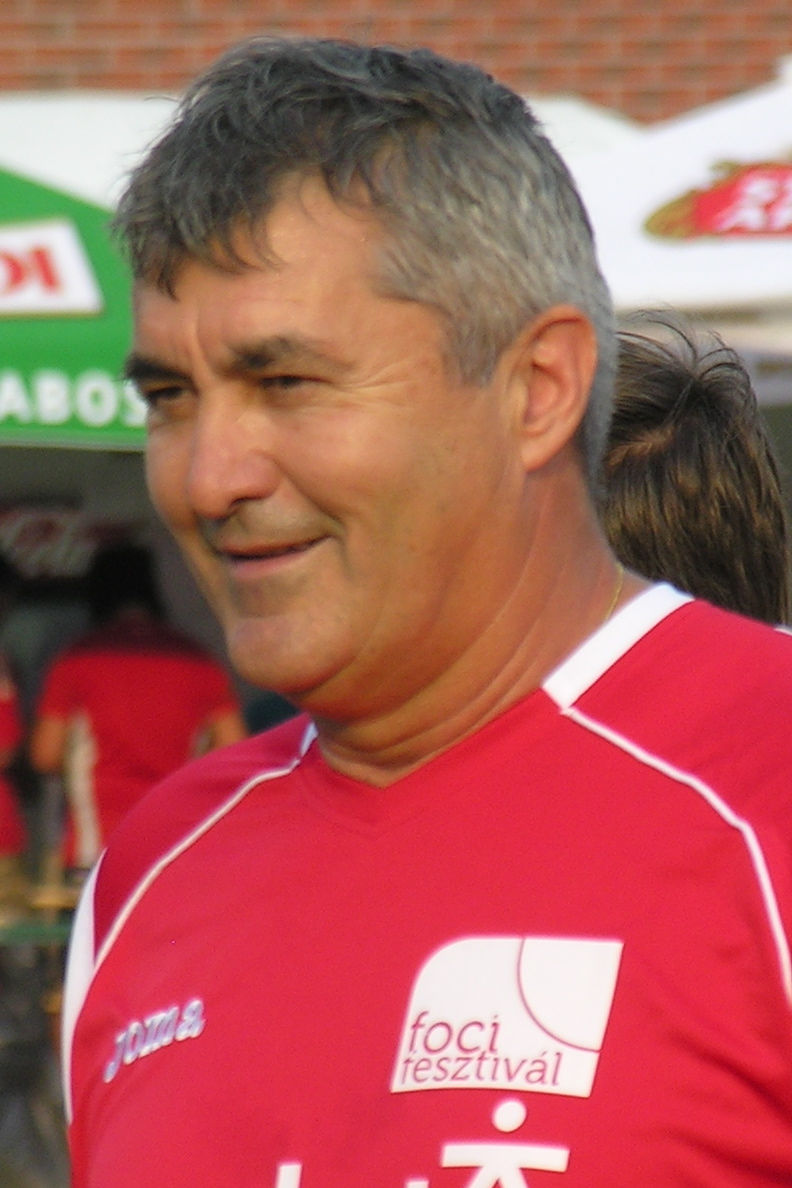
- Nagy in 2011

Personal information
- Full name: Antal Nagy
- Date of birth: 17 October 1956 (age 70)
- Place of birth: Nagyhalász, Hungary
- Height: 1.87 m (6 ft 2 in)
- Position: Defender

Senior career*
Years	Team	Apps	(Gls)
1975–1976	Szegedi EOL	14	(2)
1976–1986	Budapest Honved	279	(40)
1986–1987	Nancy	37	(4)
1987–1990	Yverdon-Sport FC		

International career
1979–1988	Hungary	32	(5)
- * Club domestic league appearances and goals

Antal Nagy (born 17 October 1956) is a former Hungarian footballer who played as a defender.
