= Sergey Rodionov =

Russian footballer

Sergei Rodionov
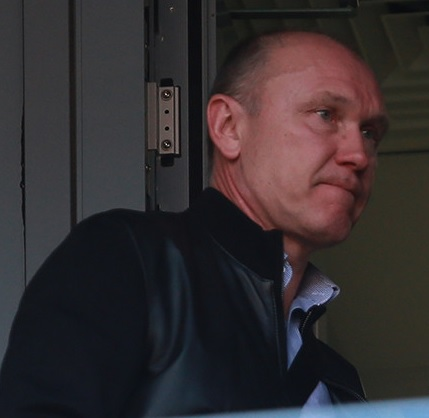
- Rodionov at a Spartak game in 2017

Personal information
- Full name: Sergei Yurievich Rodionov
- Date of birth: 3 September 1962 (age 64)
- Place of birth: Moscow, Soviet Union
- Height: 1.86 m (6 ft 1 in)
- Position: Forward

Youth career
- 1974–1978: Spartak Moscow

Senior career*
| Years | Team | Apps | (Gls) |
| 1978 | Krasnaya Presnya Moscow | 2 | (0) |
| 1979–1990 | Spartak Moscow | 279 | (119) |
| 1990–1993 | Red Star | 58 | (9) |
| 1993–1995 | Spartak Moscow | 24 | (5) |
| Total | | 363 | (130) |

International career
| 1980–1990 | USSR | 37 | (8) |

Managerial career
- 1996–1999: Spartak-d Moscow
- 2001: Spartak Lukhovitsy (consultant coach)
- 2001–2003: Spartak Moscow (reserves)
- 2003–2004: Anzhi Makhachkala (assistant)
- 2004–2006: Spartak Moscow (reserves)
- 2006–2011: Spartak Moscow (assistant)
- 2011–2015: Spartak Moscow (academy president)
- 2015–2019: Spartak Moscow (general director)
- * Club domestic league appearances and goals

Sergei Yurievich Rodionov (Russian: Серге́й Юрьевич Родионов, born 3 September 1962) is a Russian football coach and former professional player, who played most of his career as a forward for Spartak Moscow.

== Career ==
During his years at Spartak (1979–90, 1993–95) and Red Star Saint-Ouen (1990–93) he scored 162 goals.

He was a member of the USSR national team at the 1982 and 1986 World Cups.

From 2015 to 2019, he worked as the general director of Spartak Moscow.

== Honours ==
- Soviet Top League: 1979, 1987, 1989
- Russian Premier League: 1993, 1994
- Soviet Top League's top goalscorer: 1989 (16 goals)
