= József Kardos =

Hungarian footballer (1960–2022)

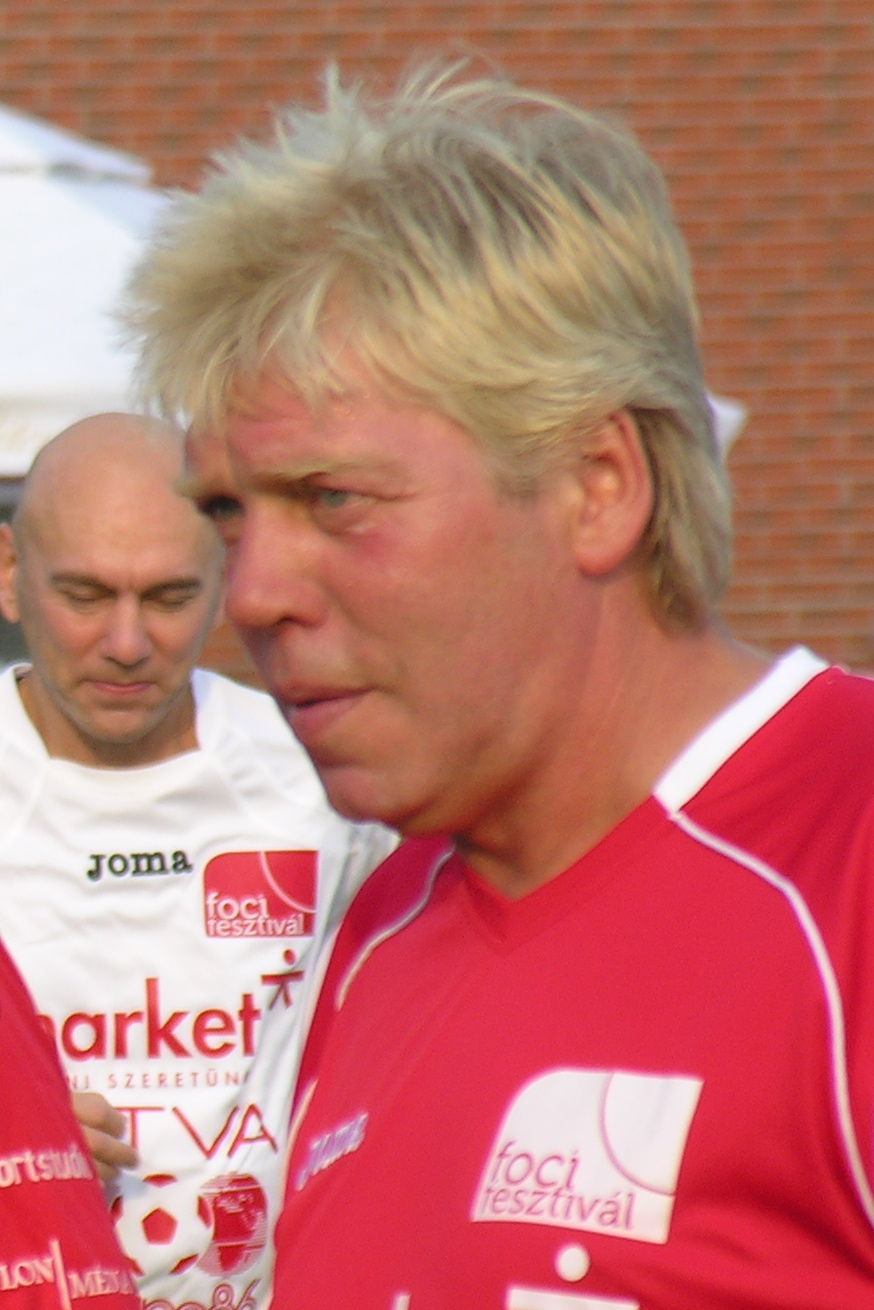

Personal information
- Date of birth: 29 March 1960
- Place of birth: Nagybátony, Hungary
- Date of death: 28 July 2022 (aged 62)
- Position: Defender

Senior career*
Years	Team	Apps	(Gls)
1978–1988	Újpesti Dózsa	229	(37)
1988–1989	Apollon Kalamarias		

International career
1980–1987	Hungary	33	(3)
- * Club domestic league appearances and goals

József Kardos (29 March 1960 – 28 July 2022) was a Hungarian footballer who played as a defender for Újpesti Dózsa and the Hungary national team.

== Career ==
Kardos was born in Nagybátony. He made his debut for the Hungary national team in 1980, and received 33 caps and scored 3 goals between then and 1987. He was a participant at the 1986 FIFA World Cup in Mexico, where Hungary failed to progress from the group stage.

In 1983 he received the Hungarian Football Player of the Year award.

== Personal life ==
Kardos died 28 July 2022, at the age of 62, from COVID-19, during the COVID-19 pandemic in Hungary.
