= Ivan Yaremchuk =

Ukrainian footballer (born 1962)

Ivan Yaremchuk Іван Яремчук
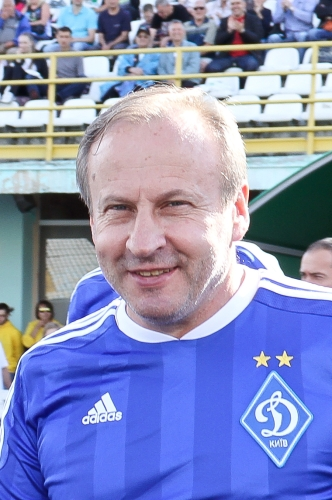

Personal information
- Full name: Ivan Ivanovych Yaremchuk
- Date of birth: 19 March 1962 (age 64)
- Place of birth: Velykyi Bychkiv, Ukrainian SSR, Soviet Union
- Height: 1.68 m (5 ft 6 in)
- Position: Midfielder

Senior career*
| Years | Team | Apps | (Gls) |
| 1979–1982 | FC Dnipro Cherkasy | 126 | (15) |
| 1983–1984 | SKA Kyiv | 83 | (22) |
| 1985–1990 | Dynamo Kyiv | 107 | (10) |
| 1991–1992 | SpVgg Blau-Weiß 1890 Berlin | 6 | (0) |
| 1992–1993 | Hertha BSC | 0 | (0) |
| 1993–1994 | KAMAZ Naberezhnye Chelny | 13 | (1) |
| 1994–1995 | Hapoel Ironi Rishon LeZion | 30 | (7) |
| 1995 | Dynamo-2 Kyiv | 1 | (1) |
| 1995 | Bohemians 1905 | 12 | (1) |
| 1996 | FC Munaishy | 16 | (1) |
| 1996 | Tekstilshchik Kamyshin | 8 | (0) |
| 1997 | Vorskla Poltava | 23 | (2) |
| 1997 | → Vorskla-2 Poltava | 4 | (0) |
| 1998 | Prykarpattya Ivano-Frankivsk | 2 | (0) |
| Total | | 431 | (60) |

International career
| 1986–1990 | Soviet Union | 18 | (2) |
- * Club domestic league appearances and goals

Ivan Ivanovych Yaremchuk (or Jaremczuk) (Ukrainian: Іван Іванович Яремчук; born 19 March 1962) is a Ukrainian former professional footballer who played as a midfielder.

== International career ==
Yaremchuk earned 18 caps for the USSR national team and played in the 1986 and 1990 World Cups.

== Personal life ==
In December 2009, he was charged with having "unnatural sex" with an underage girl. So far he is charged with one incident. He was sentenced to probation in October 2010. Allegedly he invited 13-year-old girls to his apartment and paid them 200 hryvnas (about US$25) to perform oral sex on him.

== Honours ==
Dynamo Kyiv

- Soviet Top League: 1985, 1986, 1990
- Soviet Cup: 1985, 1987, 1990
- UEFA Cup Winners' Cup: 1985–86
