= Antal Róth =

Hungarian footballer and manager

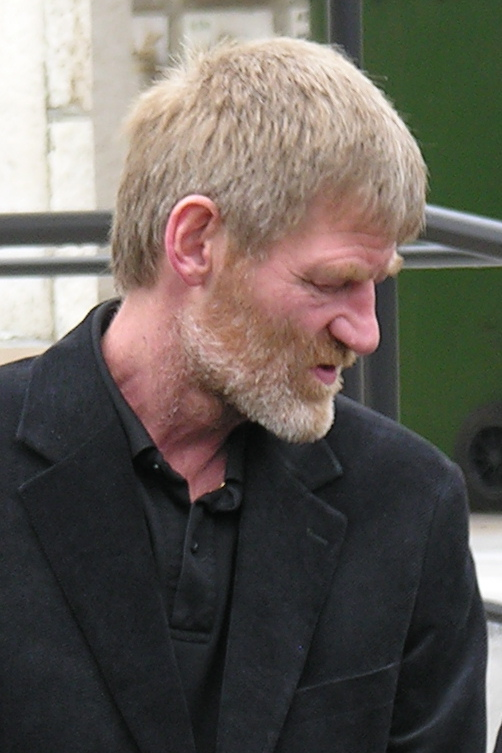

Personal information
- Full name: Antal Róth
- Date of birth: 14 September 1960 (age 66)
- Place of birth: Komló, Hungary
- Height: 1.87 m (6 ft 1 1/2 in)
- Position: Defender

Youth career
- Pécsi Munkas

Senior career*
Years	Team	Apps	(Gls)
1978–1986	Pécsi Munkas	181	(23)
1986–1990	Feyenoord	29	(3)
Total		210	(26)

International career
	Hungary	26	(1)

Managerial career
- 1992–1993: Mohácsi FC
- 1993–1994: Pécsi Mecsek FC
- 1998–2000: FC Sopron
- 2001–2002: Pécsi Mecsek FC
- 2002–2008: Hungary U-21
- 2008–2009: Pécsi Mecsek FC
- 2009–2010: Szombathelyi Haladás
- 2010–2014: Hungary U-21
- * Club domestic league appearances and goals

Antal Róth (born 14 September 1960 in Komló) is a retired Hungarian footballer who was active as a defender. Roth made his professional debut at Pécsi Munkas and also played for Feyenoord Rotterdam. After four seasons at Feyenoord he was forced to end his professional career due to a heavy injury.

He then became a manager.
