= Los Robles =

Los Robles may refer to:

- Los Robles, La Rioja, Argentina
- Los Robles La Paz in Colombia
- Los Robles Archaeological District, Arizona, United States
- Los Robles Hospital & Medical Center, California, United States
- Los Robles Ave, Major street in Pasadena, California, United States
- House at 1240 North Los Robles a U.S. National Register of Historic Places
- Los Robles the home of California Governor Stoneman Adobe, Los Robles
  - Robles is Spanish for "oaks".

== See also ==
- Robles (disambiguation)
