= List of visitors to Tsitsernakaberd =

List of visitors to the Armenian Genocide Memorial in Yerevan, Armenia

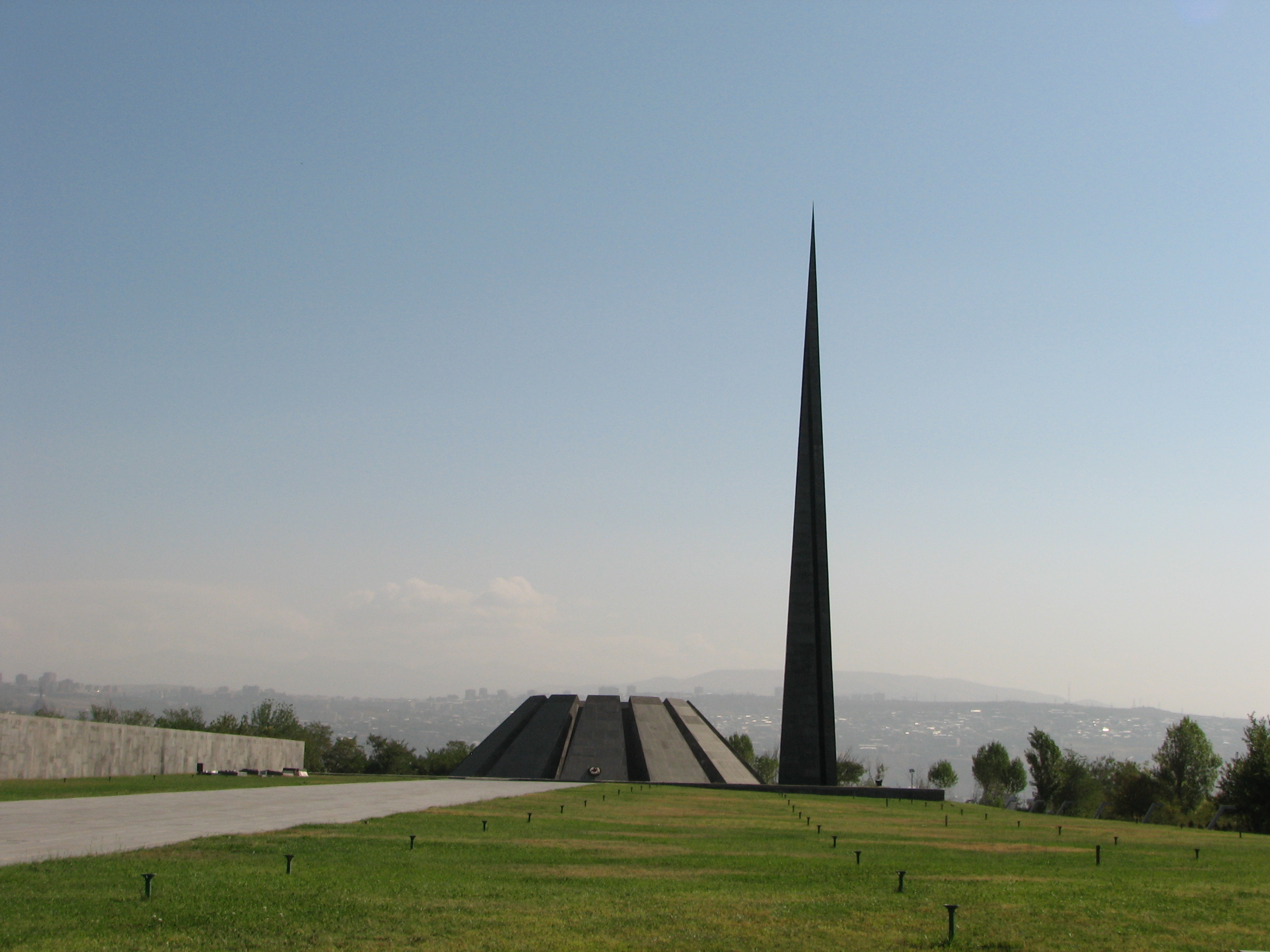
The Tsitsernakaberd memorial

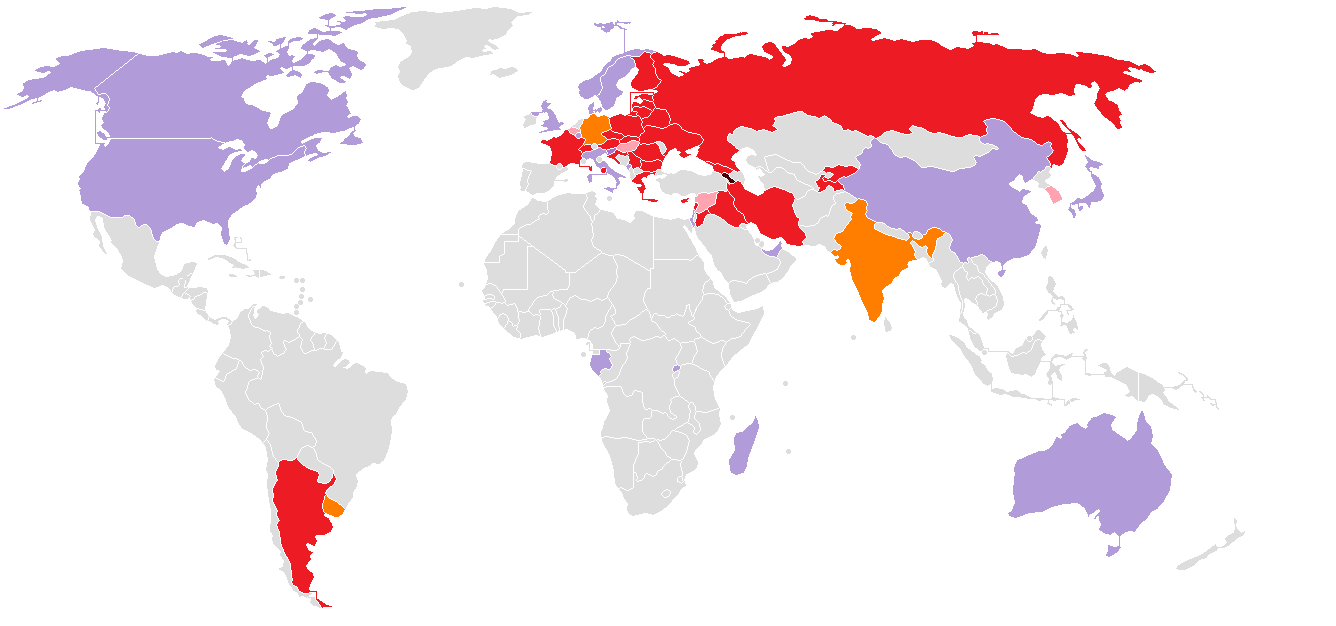
An incomplete map showing the position of the highest state officials by countries that have visited the memorial Heads of State Heads of Government Heads of Parliamentary body A cabinet minister

A wide range of politicians, artists, musicians, athletes, and religious figures have visited Tsitsernakaberd, the official memorial to the Armenian genocide victims in Yerevan, Armenia. It was opened in 1967 following the mass demonstrations that took place in Yerevan on April 24, 1965, on the 50th anniversary of the deportation of hundreds of Armenian intellectuals from Constantinople that marked the beginning of the genocide. After Armenia's independence from the Soviet Union in 1991, the memorial became a part of official ceremonies. Since then, almost every foreign official who visited Armenia included a visit to the memorial to pay tribute to the victims of the genocide. A visit to Tsitsernakaberd often includes a tour in the nearby museum. Some notable visitors have planted trees at the memorial.

The most notable ones visitors include Presidents of Russia (Boris Yeltsin, Vladimir Putin, Dmitry Medvedev), France (Jacques Chirac, Nicolas Sarkozy, François Hollande), Ukraine, Czech Republic, Poland, Greece, Georgia, Iran, Belarus, Romania, Lebanon, Croatia, Serbia, and Prime Ministers of Bulgaria, Czech Republic and other countries. Foreign Ministers of many countries (including US Secretary of State Hillary Clinton and several high-ranking officials of the European Union — including José Manuel Barroso and Herman Van Rompuy) — have honored the victims by visiting Tsitsernakaberd. Other visitors include Pope John Paul II in 2001, Pope Francis in 2016, the Chief Rabbi of Israel Yona Metzger, the Primate of All England Rowan Williams, the Patriarch of the Russian Orthodox Church Kirill I of Moscow, World Chess champion Vladimir Kramnik, World football champion Youri Djorkaeff, English rock star Ian Gillan, Serbian filmmaker Emir Kusturica, French actors Gérard Depardieu and Alain Delon, Nobel Prize winner in Physics Zhores Alferov.

No current Turkish state official has visited Tsitsernakaberd.

== Significance and controversies ==
Armenian genocide recognition is one of the most important foreign policy issues of Armenia, and is the number one goal of the diaspora Armenian organizations. Many Armenians look at these visits as a sign of recognition of the genocide.

O Judge of the living and the dead, have mercy on us!
Listen, O Lord, to the lament that rises from this place,
to the call of the dead from the depths of the Metz Yeghérn,
the cry of innocent blood that pleads like the blood of Abel,
like Rachel weeping for her children because they are no more.

— Pope John Paul's prayer at the memorial on September 26, 2001

=== Pope John Paul II's visit in 2001 ===
Pope John Paul II arrived in Yerevan on September 25, 2001, to participate in the celebrations of 1,700th anniversary of the adoption of Christianity as the national religion of Armenia. The Pope visited the memorial the next day after meeting with President Robert Kocharyan. He laid a wreath for the victims of the genocide, made a short speech, and read a prayer. The Pope used the term Metz Yeghern (the Armenian word for genocide, which literally translates as "Great Crime") in his prayer, causing a controversy regarding whether he recognized the events of 1915 as a genocide or not. Nevertheless, it aroused a wave of discontent in Turkey.

=== Hillary Clinton's visit in 2010 ===
U.S. Secretary of State Hillary Clinton arrived in Yerevan on July 4, 2010, on America's independence day, thus becoming the highest-ranked American official to visit the country. Her visit was considered "to be symbolic but nonetheless significant" and her possible visit to Tsitsernakaberd became a subject of much discussion in the Armenian media. The United States had not yet recognized the Armenian Genocide officially and by visiting the genocide memorial, many thought that by her visit, the United States sent a clear political message to Turkey. She visited the memorial on July 5, before leaving for Tbilisi. The wreath that Clinton laid at the memorial read "From Secretary of State Hillary Rodham Clinton" although it was first announced that her visit would be non-official.

=== UN GA President, 2022 ===
Abdulla Shahid, President of the United Nations General Assembly, visited the memorial and the museum on July 27, 2022, and posted pictures of the visit to Twitter, where he laid a wreath at the monument and thanked the manager of the Armenian Genocide Museum Institute for organizing the tour. However, he later deleted the post due to pressure from Turkey. Turkey's Foreign Ministry then charged that Shahid's visit "has been exploited with the purpose of exposing one-sided Armenian claims and it is in that context that he paid a visit to the so-called genocide memorial."

=== JD Vance, 2026 ===
U.S. Vice President JD Vance visited the memorial in February 2026 with his wife Usha Vance. Shortly thereafter his social media post about the visit was deleted. The Trump administration has not recognized the Armenian genocide. Vance's office said the post was made in error by staff who were not part of the delegation.

=== Refusals ===
Turkish President Abdullah Gül visited Armenia in September 2008 to attend a football match between the Armenian and Turkish national teams in Yerevan. Since the Turkish government denies the fact of genocide, he did not visit the memorial. Other presidents who opted not to pay a visit to Tsitsernakaberd were Syrian President Bashar al-Assad and Iranian Mahmoud Ahmadinejad. They refused to visit the memorial so as not to compromise their bilateral relationship with neighboring Turkey.

In 2010, Mevlüt Çavuşoğlu, the Turkish President of the Parliamentary Assembly of the Council of Europe (PACE), refused to visit the memorial stating, "it is my own decision. I respect your opinion and you should respect mine."

== Politicians ==
=== Monarchs ===
- King Abdullah II of Jordan (2020)

=== Presidents ===
- (Argentina) Carlos Menem (1998)
- (Romania) Emil Constantinescu (1998)
- (Bulgaria) Petar Stoyanov (1999)
- (Greece) Konstantinos Stephanopoulos (1999)
- (Lebanon) Émile Lahoud (2001)
- (Romania) Ion Iliescu (2001)
- (Georgia (country)) Eduard Shevardnadze (2001)
- (Poland) Aleksander Kwaśniewski (2001)
- (Kyrgyzstan) Askar Akayev (1997, 2002)
- (Ukraine) Leonid Kuchma (2002)
- (Russia) Boris Yeltsin (2002) as former President
- (Lithuania) Rolandas Paksas (2003)
- (Iran) Mohammad Khatami (2004)
- (Estonia) Arnold Rüütel (2004)
- (Finland) Tarja Halonen (2005)
- (Romania) Traian Băsescu (2006)
- (France) Jacques Chirac (2006)
- (Croatia) Stjepan Mesić (2009)
- (Georgia (country)) Mikheil Saakashvili (2009)
- (Cyprus) Demetris Christofias (2009)
- (Serbia) Boris Tadić (2009)
- (Latvia) Valdis Zatlers (2009)
- (Russia) Dmitry Medvedev (2008, 2010)
- (Slovenia) Danilo Türk (2010)
- (Switzerland) Micheline Calmy-Rey (2011)
- (Lithuania) Dalia Grybauskaitė (2011)
- (France) Nicolas Sarkozy (2011)
- (Poland) Bronisław Komorowski (2011)
- (Lebanon) Michel Suleiman (2011)
- (Austria) Heinz Fischer (2012)
- (Belarus) Alexander Lukashenko (2013)
- (Greece) Karolos Papoulias (2007, 2014)
- (Georgia (country)) Giorgi Margvelashvili (2014)
- (Switzerland) Didier Burkhalter (2014)
- (Cyprus) Nicos Anastasiades (2015)
- (Serbia) Tomislav Nikolić (2014, 2015)
- (France) François Hollande (2014, 2015)
- (Russia) Vladimir Putin (2001, 2013, 2015)
- (Czech Republic) Miloš Zeman (2016)
- (Tajikistan) Emomali Rahmon (2003, 2017)
- (Bulgaria) Rumen Radev (2018)
- (Lebanon) Michel Aoun (2018)
- (Italy) Sergio Mattarella (2018)
- (France) Emmanuel Macron (2018, 2026)
- (Georgia (country)) Salome Zurabishvili (2019)
- (Greece) Prokopis Pavlopoulos (2019)
- (Lithuania) Gitanas Nausėda (2022)
- (Montenegro) Milo Đukanović (2022)
- (Iraq) Abdul Latif Rashid (2023)
- (Poland) Andrzej Duda (2024)
- (Germany) Frank-Walter Steinmeier (2025)
- (Georgia (country)) Mikheil Kavelashvili (2025)
- (Latvia) Edgars Rinkēvičs (2026)
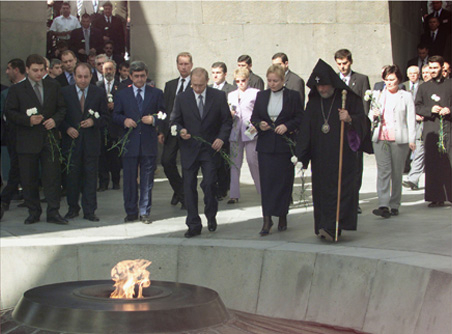
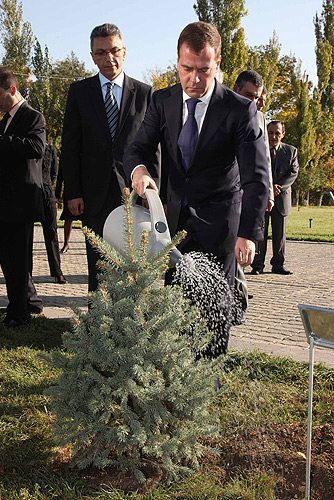
Russian Presidents Vladimir Putin (left) in 2001 and Dmitry Medvedev in 2008 (right) at Tsitsernakaberd.

External videos
- Hillary Clinton's visit in 2010
- Nicolas Sarkozy at the memorial, 2011

=== Vice-Presidents ===
- (India) Bhairon Singh Shekhawat (2005)
- (Uruguay) Danilo Astori (2014)
- (India) Mohammad Hamid Ansari (2017)
- (United States) JD Vance (2026)

=== Prime Ministers ===
- (Canada) Pierre Trudeau (1984) as former Prime Minister
- (Lebanon) Rafic Hariri (1997)
- (Lebanon) Issam Fares (2001)
- (Russia) Mikhail Kasyanov (2002)
- (Belarus) Sergei Sidorsky (2006)
- (Georgia (country)) Zurab Nogaideli (2007)
- (Bulgaria) Sergey Stanishev (2007)
- (Russia) Viktor Zubkov (2008)
- (Czech Republic) Jan Fischer (2010)
- (Poland) Donald Tusk (2010)
- (Bulgaria) Boyko Borisov (2012)
- (Georgia (country)) Bidzina Ivanishvili (2013)
- (Georgia (country)) Irakli Garibashvili (2014, 2021)
- (Russia) Dmitry Medvedev (2016)
- (Georgia (country)) Giorgi Kvirikashvili (2016)
- (Germany) Angela Merkel (2018)
- (Georgia (country)) Mamuka Bakhtadze (2018)
- (Belgium) Charles Michel (2018)
- (Canada) Justin Trudeau (2018)
- (Vanuatu) Charlot Salwai (2018)
- (Singapore) Lee Hsien Loong (2019)
- (Georgia (country)) Giorgi Gakharia (2019)
- (Lithuania) Ingrida Šimonytė (2023)
- (Georgia (country)) Irakli Kobakhidze (2024)
- (Slovakia) Robert Fico (2025)

=== Speakers ===
- (Russia) Gennadiy Seleznyov (1996)
- (France) Christian Poncelet (1999)
- (Syria) Abdul Qadir Qaddura (2001)
- (Germany) Antje Vollmer (2001)
- (Lithuania) Artūras Paulauskas (2005)
- (Latvia) Ingrīda Ūdre (2005)
- (Belarus) Vladimir Konoplyov (2005)
- (Belgium) Anne-Marie Lizin (2005)
- (Belgium) Herman De Croo (2005)
- (Iran) Gholam-Ali Haddad-Adel (2006)
- (Poland) Bogdan Borusewicz (2006)
- (Bulgaria) Georgi Pirinski (2006)
- (France) Christian Poncelet (2006)
- (France) Jean-Louis Debré (2006)
- (Czech Republic) Přemysl Sobotka (2008)
- (Georgia (country)) David Bakradze (2009)
- (Belgium) Armand De Decker (2009)
- (Russia) Boris Gryzlov (2010)
- (Croatia) Luka Bebić (2011)
- (Hungary) László Kövér (2011)
- (Ukraine) Volodymyr Lytvyn (2011)
- (Lebanon) Nabih Berri (2011)
- (South Korea) Hon Jae Hyon (2012)
- (Uruguay) Jorge Orrico (2012)
- (Germany) Norbert Lammert (2013)
- (Greece) Vangelis Meimarakis (2014)
- (Cyprus) Yiannakis Omirou (2014)
- (Georgia (country)) David Usupashvili (2015)
- (Syria) Mohammad Jihad al-Laham (2015)
- (Greece) Zoe Konstantopoulou (2015)
- (Russia) Sergey Naryshkin (2012, 2015, 2016)
- (Czech Republic) Jan Hamáček (2015)
- (Serbia) Maja Gojković (2016)
- (United States) Nancy Pelosi (2022)
- (Slovenia) Urška Klakočar Zupančič (2023)

=== Cabinet ministers ===
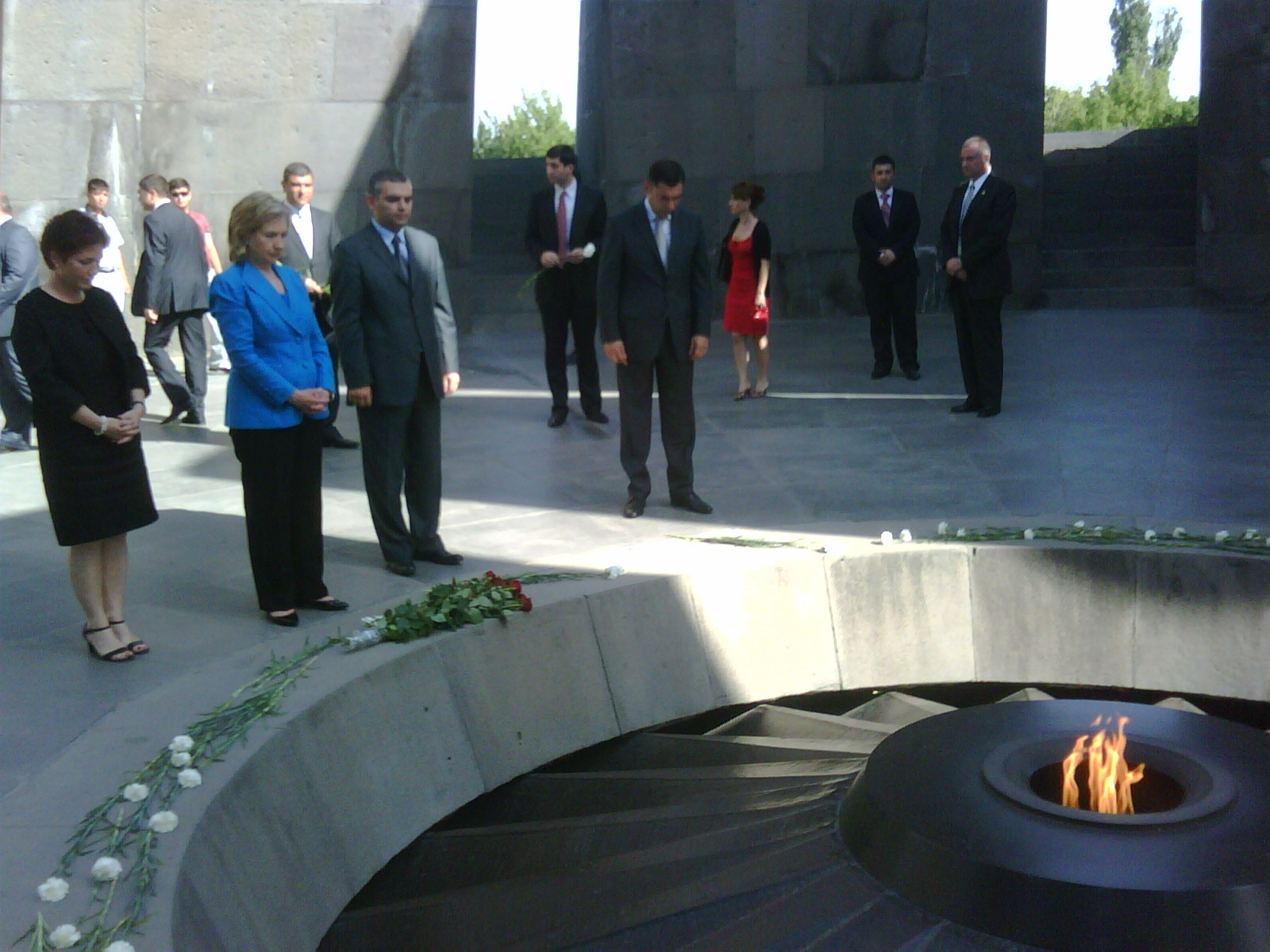
U.S. Secretary of State Hillary Clinton visit in Tsitsernakaberd, Yerevan, Armenia in July 2010

Ministers of Foreign Affairs

- (Cyprus) Ioannis Kasoulidis (1998)
- (Slovakia) Eduard Kukan (2000)
- (Latvia) Indulis Bērziņš (2001)
- (Estonia) Toomas Hendrik Ilves (2001)
- (Ukraine) Anatoliy Zlenko (2001)
- (Slovenia) Dimitrij Rupel (2002)
- (Germany) Joschka Fischer (2004)
- (Denmark) Per Stig Møller (2004)
- (France) Philippe Douste-Blazy (2006)
- (Switzerland) Micheline Calmy-Rey (2006)
- (Germany) Frank-Walter Steinmeier (2007)
- (Poland) Anna Fotyga (2007)
- (Latvia) Artis Pabriks (2007)
- (Hungary) Kinga Göncz (2008)
- (Georgia (country)) Grigol Vashadze (2009)
- (Estonia) Urmas Paet (2009)
- (Argentina) Jorge Taiana (2010)
- (Austria) Michael Spindelegger (2010)
- (United States) Hillary Clinton (2010)
- (Switzerland) Peter Maurer (2010)
- (Poland) Radosław Sikorski (2010)
- (Ukraine) Kostyantyn Gryshchenko (2011)
- (China) Yang Jiechi (2011)
- (Sweden) Carl Bildt (2011)
- (Norway) Jonas Gahr Støre (2011)
- (Germany) Guido Westerwelle (2012)
- (Cyprus) Erato Kozakou-Marcoullis (2012)
- (Finland) Erkki Tuomioja (2012)
- (Lithuania) Audronius Ažubalis (2012)
- (Belarus) Sergei Martynov (2012)
- (Uruguay) Luis Almagro (2012)
- (Luxembourg) Jean Asselborn (2012)
- (Latvia) Edgars Rinkēvičs (2012)
- (Slovakia) Miroslav Lajčák (2013)
- (Montenegro) Igor Lukšić (2013)
- (Iraq) Hoshyar Zebari (2013)
- (Czech Republic) Karel Schwarzenberg (2008, 2013)
- (Serbia) Ivan Mrkić (2014)
- (Austria) Sebastian Kurz (2014)
- (Germany) Frank-Walter Steinmeier (2014)
- (Lithuania) Linas Linkevičius (2014)
- (Russia) Sergey Lavrov (2007, 2012, 2014, 2021)
- (Lebanon) Gebran Bassil (2015)
- (Argentina) Héctor Marcos Timerman (2012, 2015)
- (Belgium) Didier Reynders (2015)
- (Czech Republic) Lubomír Zaorálek (2015)
- (Sweden) Margot Wallström (2016)
- (Georgia (country)) Mikheil Janelidze (2016)
- (United Arab Emirates) Abdullah bin Zayed Al Nahyan (2017)
- (Brazil) Aloysio Nunes (2017)
- (Madagascar) Henry Rabary-Njaka (2018)
- (Rwanda) Louise Mushikiwabo (2018)
- (Gabon) Régis Immongault Tatangani (2018)
- (Japan) Taro Kono (2018)
- (Netherlands) Stef Blok (2020)
- (Greece) Nikos Dendias (2020)
- (Slovakia) Ivan Korčok (2021)
- (Lithuania) Gabrielius Landsbergis (2021)
- (India) S. Jaishankar (2021)
- (Austria) Alexander Schallenberg (2022)
- (Italy) Luigi Di Maio (2022)
- (Norway) Anniken Huitfeldt (2022)
- (France) Catherine Colonna (2023)
- (Canada) Mélanie Joly (2023)
- (Germany) Annalena Baerbock (2023)
- (Estonia) Margus Tsahkna (2023)
- (Greece) Giorgos Gerapetritis (2024)
- (Cyprus) Constantinos Kombos (2024)
- (Luxembourg) Xavier Bettel (2024)
- (Georgia (country)) Maka Botchorishvili (2025)
- (France) Jean-Noël Barrot (2025)

Other ministers

- (Serbia and Montenegro) Živadin Jovanović, Deputy Foreign Minister (1995)
- (Russia) Igor Sergeyev, Minister of Defence (1998)
- (Russia) Georgy Boos, Minister of Taxes and Levies (1999)
- (Israel) Nawaf Massalha, Deputy Foreign Minister (2000)
- (Lebanon) Sebouh Hovnanian, Minister of Youth and Culture (2001)
- (Lithuania) Gediminas Kirkilas, Minister of National Defense (2005)
- (Australia) Joe Hockey, Minister for Human Services (2005)
- (Russia) Sergey Ivanov, Minister of Defence (2006)
- (France) Christian Estrosi, Territorial Minister (2007)
- (Romania) Teodor Meleşcanu, Defense Minister (2007)
- (Belarus) Alexander Radkov, Minister of Education (2007)
- (Russia) Andrei Fursenko, Minister of Education and Science (2007)
- (Tajikistan) Abdujabbor Rahmanov, Minister of Education (2007)
- (Lithuania) Juozas Olekas, Minister of National Defense (2007)
- (Slovakia) Štefan Harabin, Minister of Justice (2008)
- (Russia) Pavel Grachev, former Defence Minister (2008)
- (Georgia (country)) Ghia Nodia, Minister of Education and Science (2008)
- (Belarus) Vladimir Matvichuk, Minister of Culture (2008)
- (Slovakia) Marek Maďarič, Minister of Culture (2008)
- (Poland) Bogdan Klich, National Defense Minister (2009)
- (France) Patrick Devedjian, Minister of the Implementation of the Recovery Plan (2010)
- (Georgia (country)) Dimitri Shashkini, Minister of Education and Science (2010)
- (France) Henri de Raincourt, Minister of Co-operation (2011)
- (Israel) Orit Noked, Minister of Agriculture (2012)
- (Germany) Cornelia Pieper, Minister of State (2012)
- (Lithuania) Rasa Juknevičienė, Minister of National Defense (2012)
- (Israel) Yuli-Yoel Edelstein, Diaspora Affairs Minister (2012)
- (Italy) Giampaolo Di Paola, Minister of Defence (2012)
- (Russia) Sergei Shoigu, Minister of Defense (2013)
- (India) Paban Singh Ghatowar, Minister of Parliamentary Affairs (2013)
- (Greece) Dimitris Avramopoulos, Minister of National Defense (2013)
- (Iraq) Rowsch Shaways, Deputy Prime Minister (2013)
- (Canada) Jason Kenney, Minister of Employment and Social Development (2014)
- (United Kingdom) David Lidington, Minister of State for Europe (2014)
- (Georgia (country)) Alexander Chikaidze, Minister of Internal Affairs (2014)
- (Lithuania) Juozas Bernatonis, Minister of Justice (2015)
- (Iraq) Baqir Jabr al-Zubeidi, Minister of Transport (2015)
- (Lebanon) Arthur Nazarian, Minister of Energy (2015)
- (Lebanon) Elias Bou Saab, Minister of Education (2015)
- (Canada) Chris Alexander, Minister of Citizenship and Immigration (2015)
- (Uruguay) José Luis Cancela, Deputy Foreign Minister (2015)
- (Cyprus) Christoforos Fokaides, Minister of Defence (2015)
- (Czech Republic) Michaela Marksová-Tominová, Minister of Labour and Social Affairs (2015)
- (Georgia (country)) Giorgi Mgerbishvilli, Minister of Corrections and Legal Assistance (2015)
- (Georgia (country)) Thea Tsulukiani, Minister of Justice (2015)
- (United Arab Emirates) Abdul Rahman Mohammed Al Owais, Minister of Health (2015)
- (Germany) Michael Roth, Minister of State for Europe (2015)
- (Georgia (country)) Tinatin Khidasheli, Minister of Defence (2016)
- (Israel) Tzachi Hanegbi, Regional Cooperation Minister (2017)
- (Iraq) Juma Anad, Defense Minister (2021)
- (France) Sébastien Lecornu, Minister of Defence (2024)
- (Greece) Nikos Dendias, Defense Minister (2024)

=== Other government officials ===
- (Soviet Union) Alexander Yakovlev, member of the Politburo (1988)
- (Russia) Alexander Lebed, former Secretary of the Russian Federation Council (1997)
- (United States) Stephen Sestanovich, Adviser on newly independent states to the Secretary of State (1999)
- (Lebanon) Jamil Al Sayyed, General Security Directorate (2001)
- (Russia) Anatoly Kvashnin, Chief of the Russian General Staff (2001)
- (Russia) Sergey Mironov, Chairman of the Federation Council (2002)
- (United States) Howard Dean, Chairman of the Democratic National Committee (2005)
- (China) Xu Jialu, Vice-chairman of the Standing Committee of the National People's Congress
- (Greece) Dimitrios Grapsas, Chief of the Hellenic Army General Staff (2007)
- (Russia) Vladimir Sergeyevich Mikhaylov, Commander-in-chief of the Russian Air Force (2007)
- (Italy) Umberto Ranieri, Chairman of the Foreign Affairs Committee (2007)
- (Russia) Vladimir Churov, Chairman of the Central Election Commission (2008)
- (United States) Tod Bunting, Adjutant General of Kansas (2008)
- (Latvia) Gunārs Kūtris, President of the Constitutional Court (2008)
- (Czech Republic) Jan Kasal, vice-chairman of the Chamber of Deputies (2008)
- (Greece) Frangos Frangoulis, Chief of the Hellenic Army General Staff (2010)
- (Israel) Micha Lindenstrauss, State Comptroller and Ombudsman (2010)
- (United States) Marie L. Yovanovitch, U.S. Ambassador in Armenia (2010)
- (Czech Republic) Vojtěch Filip, vice-chairman of the Chamber of Deputies (2010)
- (Russia) Valentina Matviyenko, Chairman of the Federation Council (2012)
- (United States) John A. Heffern, U.S. Ambassador in Armenia (2012)
- (Germany) Wolfgang Thierse, vice-president of the Bundestag (2012)
- (Belarus) Viktor Guminsky, Deputy Speaker of the Belarusian Parliament
- (China) Cao Jianming, Procurator-General of the Supreme People's Procuratorate (2012)
- (Australia) Marie Ficarra, Member of the New South Wales Legislative Council (2013)
- (Australia) Amanda Fazio, Member of the New South Wales Legislative Council (2013)
- (Australia) David Clarke, Member of the New South Wales Legislative Council (2013)
- (Australia) Fred Nile, Member of the New South Wales Legislative Council (2013)
- (Australia) Shaoquett Moselmane, Member of the New South Wales Legislative Council (2013)
- (Australia) Gladys Berejiklian, Minister for Transport of New South Wales (2013)
- (Kuwait) Ali Fahad Al-Rashid, head of the foreign affairs committee of the National Assembly (2013)
- (United Kingdom) Baroness Gloria Hooper, Deputy Speaker and life peer of the House of Lords (2014)
- (United Kingdom) Baron Faulkner of Worcester, Deputy Speaker and life peer of the House of Lords (2014)
- (Israel) Anna Azari, Head of Eurasia Division of the Israeli Ministry of Foreign Affairs (2014)
- (United States) Victoria Nuland, Assistant Secretary of State for European and Eurasian Affairs (2015)
- (United States) Evelyn Farkas, Deputy Assistant Secretary of Defense for Eurasia (2015)
- (Germany) Cem Özdemir, Co-chairman of the Green Party (2015)
- (Russia) Andrey Belyaninov, Head of Federal Customs Service (2015)
- (Argentina) Norma Abdala de Matarazzo, First Vice President of the Chamber of Deputies (2015)
- Jacob Lew, United States Secretary of the Treasury (2015)
- (Bulgaria) Krasimir Karakachanov, Deputy Speaker of the National Assembly (2015)
- (Czech Republic) Zdeněk Škromach, vice-president of the Senate (2015)
- (Sweden) Esabelle Dingizian, Deputy Speaker of the Parliament (2015)
- (Chile) Denise Pascal, Vice President of Parliament (2015)
- (Georgia (country)) Manana Kobakhidze, First Vice-Speaker of the Parliament (2015)
- (Romania) Carmen Bendovski, former counselor to the Minister of Foreign Affairs (2015)
- (Czech Republic) Pavel Rychetský, president of the Czech Constitutional Court (2015)
- (France) Harlem Désir, Secretary of State for European Affairs (2015)
- (France) Annick Girardin, Secretary of State for Development (2016)
- Felipe Alejos Lorenzana, First Vice President of Guatemala (2019)

=== Members of Parliament / Congress ===
(United States) U.S. Senators

- Jack Reed (D-RI) (1997)
- Bob Dole (R-KS) (1997)
- Dick Durbin (D-IL) (2012)

(United States) U.S. Congresspeople

- Joseph P. Kennedy II (D-MA) (1993)
- Patrick J. Kennedy (D-RI) (1997)
- Frank Pallone (D-NJ) (1997)
- Dick Gephardt (D-MO) (1998)
- James Rogan (R-CA) (1999)
- Connie Morella (R-MD) (1999)
- Pete Visclosky (D-IN) (2004)
- Joseph Crowley (D-NY) (2007)
- Adam Schiff (D-CA) (2008)
- Devin Nunes (R-CA) (2012)
- Ed Royce (R-CA) (2014)
- Eliot Engel (D-NY) (2014)
- David Cicilline (D-RI) (2014)
- Lois Frankel (D-FL) (2014)
- Jackie Speier (D-CA) (2015)
- Anna Eshoo (D-CA) (2015)
- David Trott (R-MI) (2015)
- Frank Pallone (D-NJ) (2015)

(Europe) Member of the European Parliament (MEPs)

- Pia Locatelli, Italy (2007)
- Tomasz Poręba, Poland (2010)
- Slavcho Binev, Bulgaria (2011)
- Evgeni Kirilov, Bulgaria (2011)
- Libor Rouček, Czech Republic (2011)
- Milan Cabrnoch, Czech Republic (2011)
- Laima Andrikienė, Lithuania (2012)
- Martin Callanan, UK (2013)
- Tatjana Ždanoka, Latvia (2015)
- Jaromír Štětina, Czech Republic (2015)
- Heidi Hautala, Finland (2015)
- Ryszard Czarnecki, Poland (2014, 2015)

Other

- (Israel) Yossi Sarid (2005)
- (Belgium) François Roelants du Vivier (2006)
- (France) Georges Colombier (2006)
- (Italy) Margherita Boniver (2007)
- (Italy) Leoluca Orlando (2007)
- (Italy) Raffaello De Brasi (2007)
- (Switzerland) Christine Egerszegi (2008)
- (Iran) Arsalan Fathipour (2009)
- (France) Serge Lagauche (2010)
- (United Kingdom) Caroline Cox (2011)
- (South Korea) Nah Youn Mi (2012)
- (France) Sophie Joissains (2012)
- (France) Bernard Fournier (2012)
- (France) Philippe Marini (2012)
- (Russia) Leonid Slutsky (2014)
- (Latvia) Dana Reizniece-Ozola (2013)
- (Latvia) Andrejs Klementjevs (2013)
- (Latvia) Inese Lībiņa-Egnere (2013)
- (Canada) Stéphane Dion (2013)
- (France) Valérie Boyer (2013)
- (France) Guy Teissier (2013)
- (Bahrain) Hassan Ayed Bukhamas (2013)
- (United Kingdom) Stephen Pound (2014)
- (United Kingdom) John Whittingdale (2014)
- (United Kingdom) Mike Gapes (2014)
- (Canada) Brad Butt (2014)
- (Canada) Leon Benoit (2014)
- (Canada) Russ Hiebert (2014)
- (Czech Republic) Zuzka Bebarová-Rujbrová (2014)
- (France) Bruno Le Roux (2014)
- (France) René Rouquet (2013, 2014)
- (Russia) Nikolai Ryzhkov (2014)
- (Germany) Ekin Deligöz (2015)
- (Israel) Nachman Shai (2015)
- (Israel) Anat Berko (2015)
- (Cyprus) Giorgos Varnava (2015)
- (Cyprus) Marios Garoyian (2015)
- (Cyprus) Eleni Theocharous (2014, 2015)
- (Belgium) Karl Vanlouwe (2015)
- (Latvia) Gundars Daudze (2015)
- (Canada) Harold Albrecht (2010, 2015)
- (Netherlands) Harry van Bommel (2015)
- (South Korea) Noh Young-min (2015)
- (Austria) Hannes Weninger (2015)
- (Belgium) Julie de Groote (2015)
- (Belgium) Fatoumata Sidibé (2015)
- (Belgium) André du Bus de Warnaffe (2015)
- (Belgium) Hervé Doyen (2015)
- (Belgium) Simone Susskind (2015)
- (Belgium) Vanessa Matz (2015)
- (Belgium) Karim Van Overmeire (2015)
- (Romania) László Borbély (2015)
- (United Kingdom) Mark Pritchard (2016)
- (Israel) Tali Ploskov (2016)
- (Latvia) Sergejs Potapkins (2016)
- (Greece) Liana Kanelli (2016)
- (Sweden) Kenneth G. Forslund (2017)
- (Germany) Michael Roth (2023)

=== Regional and local ===
U.S. State legislators and City Council members

- (United States) Paul Krekorian, Los Angeles City Councilman (2004 and 2013)
- (United States) John Pérez, Speaker of the California State Assembly (2013)
- (United States) Katcho Achadjian, Member of the California State Assembly (2013)
- (United States) Cheryl Brown, Member of the California State Assembly (2013)
- (United States) Adrin Nazarian, Member of the California State Assembly (2013)
- (United States) Scott Wilk, Member of the California State Assembly (2013)
- (United States) Bob Blumenfield, Los Angeles City Councilman (2013)

Governors

- (Russia) Boris Gromov, Governor of Moscow Oblast (2008)
- (Russia) Georgy Boos, Governor of Kaliningrad (2009)
- (Russia) Georgy Poltavchenko, Governor of Saint Petersburg (2015)

Mayors

- Gürbüz Çapan — Esenyurt, Istanbul Province, Turkey (1995)
- Yury Luzhkov — Moscow, Russia (2003, 2005)
- Jacques Peyrat — Nice, France (2007)
- Jean-Claude Gaudin — Marseille, France (2007, 2013)
- Gérald Tremblay — Montreal, Canada (2010, 2011)
- Bertrand Delanoë — Paris, France (2011)
- Osman Baydemir — Diyarbakır, Turkey (2014)
- Maysar Haji Salih — Shangal, Iraq (2015)
- Delegation of twelve mayors from Germany (2015)
- Bekir Kaya – Van, Turkey (2015)
- Huseyin Olan – Bitlis, Turkey (2015)
- Ozcan Birlik – Mutki, Turkey (2015)
- Mehmet Emin Özkan – Güroymak, Turkey (2015)
- (Georgia (country)) Avtandil Nemsitsveridze – Mtskheta, Georgia (2015)
- Anne Hidalgo – Paris, France (2016)

== Leaders or delegations from international organizations ==
- René van der Linden, President of the Parliamentary Assembly of the Council of Europe (2005)
- Vladimir Rushailo, Executive Secretary of CIS (2005, 2007)
- Terry Davis, Secretary General of the Council of Europe (2007)
- Kōichirō Matsuura, Director-General of UNESCO (2008)
- Wilfried Martens, President of the European People's Party (2010)
- Abdou Diouf, Secretary General of Organisation internationale de la Francophonie (2010)
- Thorbjørn Jagland, Secretary General of the Council of Europe (2010)
- Petros Efthymiou, President of the OSCE Parliamentary Assembly (2011)
- Jerzy Buzek, President of the European Parliament (2011)
- Jean-Claude Mignon, President of the Parliamentary Assembly of the Council of Europe (2013)
- Herwig van Staa, President of the Congress of Local and Regional Authorities of the Council of Europe (2013)
- Yuri Fedotov, Director of the United Nations Office on Drugs and Crime (2013)
- Majed el-Shafie, President and founder of One Free World International (2014)
- Delegation from the All-China Women's Federation (2014)
- Delegation from the European Jewish Parliament (2014)
- Jean-Paul Wahl, European Regional Head of the Parliamentary Assembly of La Francophonie (2015)
- Anne Brasseur, President of the Parliamentary Assembly of the Council of Europe (2015)
- Nils Muižnieks, Commissioner for Human Rights of the Council of Europe (2015)
- Delegation from the Group of States Against Corruption (GRECO) (2015)
- Nikolay Bordyuzha, General Secretary of the Collective Security Treaty Organization (2015)
- Joseph Daul, President of the European People's Party (2015)
- Members of the Executive Bureau of the Democrat Youth Community of Europe (DEMYC) (2015)
- Michael Møller, Director-General of the United Nations Office in Geneva (2015)
- Delegation from the NATO Parliamentary Assembly (2015)
- Delegation from the International Association of Genocide Scholars (2015)
- Michaëlle Jean, Secretary General of Organisation internationale de la Francophonie (2015, 2018)
- Marija Pejčinović Burić, Secretary General of the Council of Europe (2022)
- Abdulla Shahid, President of the United Nations General Assembly (2022)

=== European Union ===
- Herman Van Rompuy, President of the European Council (2012)
- José Manuel Barroso, President of the European Commission (2012)
- Donald Tusk, President of the European Council (2015)
- Charles Michel, President of the European Council (2021)

== Religious figures ==
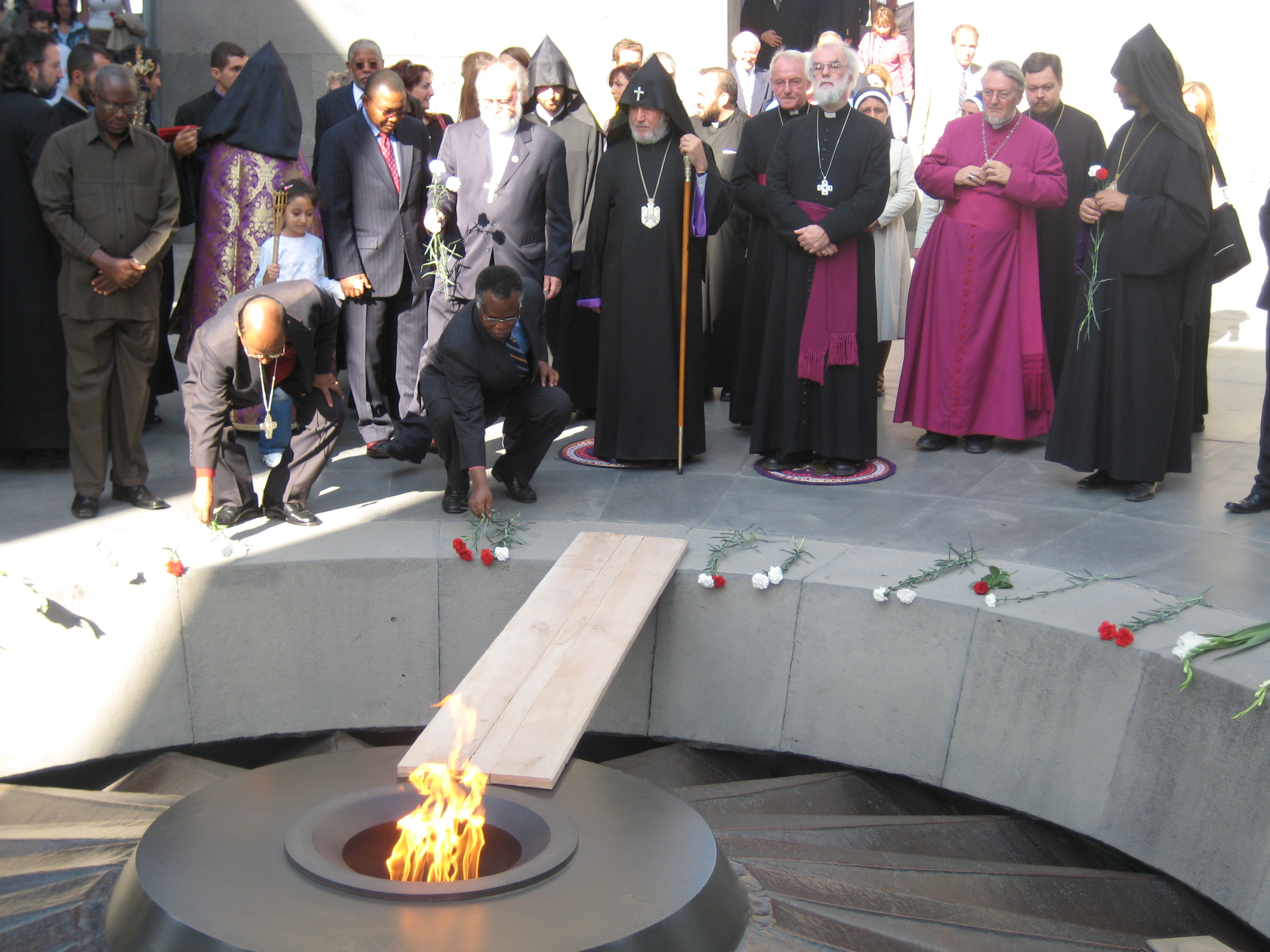
Catholicos Karekin II and Archbishop, Rowan Williams at the Armenian genocide monument in Yerevan 2007

- Konrad Raiser, General Secretary of the World Council of Churches (1996)
- Alexy II, Patriarch of Moscow and all Russia (1996)
- Pope John Paul II (2001)
- Pope Shenouda III, Pope of the Coptic Orthodox Church of Alexandria (2003)
- Stephen Blaire, Bishop of Stockton (2003)
- Robert Edward Mulvee, Bishop of Providence, Rhode Island (2003)
- Basil H. Losten, Bishop of the Ukrainian Greek Catholic Church (2003)
- Nicholas Samra, Auxiliary of the Melkite Greek Catholic Eparchy of Newton, Massachusetts (2003)
- John Joseph Nevins, Bishop of Venice, Florida (2003)
- Howard James Hubbard, Bishop of Albany, New York (2003)
- William Henry Keeler, Roman Catholic Archbishop of Baltimore (2003)
- Yona Metzger, Chief Rabbi of Israel (2005)
- Danny Rich, Chief Executive of Liberal Judaism (2007)
- Rowan Williams, Archbishop of Canterbury, Primate of All England (2007)
- Cardinal Bertone, Camerlengo of the Holy Roman Church and Secretary of State of The Vatican (2008)
- Kirill I, Patriarch of Moscow and all Russia (2010)
- Mir Tahsin Beg, religious leader of the Yazidis (2012)
- Theodore Edgar McCarrick, American cardinal of the Roman Catholic Church (2015)
- Ignatius Aphrem II, Patriarch of the Syriac Orthodox Church (2014)
- Olav Fykse Tveit, General Secretary of the World Council of Churches (2011, 2014)
- Helga Haugland Byfuglien, Bishop of the Church of Norway (2015)
- Bechara Boutros al-Rahi, Patriarch of Antioch, and head of the Maronite Church (2015)
- Kurt Koch, Swiss cardinal of the Roman Catholic Church (2015)
- John X, Orthodox Patriarchate of Antioch and All The East (2015)
- Pope Tawadros II, Pope of the Coptic Orthodox Church of Alexandria (2015)
- Christopher Hill, retired British bishop and president of the Conference of European Churches (2015)
- Richard Chartres, Bishop of London (2015)
- Robert Innes, Bishop in Europe (2015)
- Leonardo Sandri, Prefect of the Congregation for the Oriental Churches (2015)
- Pope Francis (2016)

== See also ==
- Armenian genocide
- Armenian genocide recognition
