= Luis Galván =

Argentine footballer (1948–2025)

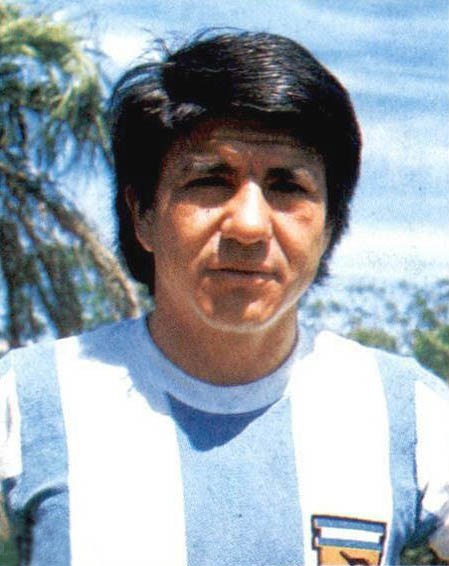
- Galván with Argentina in 1978

Personal information
- Full name: Luis Adolfo Galván
- Date of birth: 24 February 1948
- Place of birth: Fernández, Argentina
- Date of death: 5 May 2025 (aged 77)
- Place of death: Córdoba, Argentina
- Height: 1.74 m (5 ft 9 in)
- Position: Centre back

Senior career*
Years	Team	Apps	(Gls)
1970–1982	Talleres de Córdoba	267	(15)
1982–1983	Loma Negra	14	(0)
1983–1984	Belgrano de Córdoba	10	(0)
1984–1985	Central Norte	10	(0)
1986	Bolívar		
1986–1987	Talleres de Córdoba		

International career
1975–1983	Argentina	34	(0)
Medal record
Representing Argentina
FIFA World Cup
Winner	1978 Argentina	Team
- * Club domestic league appearances and goals

Luis Adolfo Galván (24 February 1948 – 5 May 2025) was an Argentine footballer who played as a centre back. He played for Argentina when the team won the 1978 FIFA World Cup.

== Club career ==
Galván was born in Fernández, Santiago del Estero. He started his career at 17, possibly playing for Club Atletico Union of Santiago del Estero.

He joined Talleres de Córdoba in 1970, which was the club where he spent the majority of his career. He never won a major trophy with the club but did help Talleres achieve second (1977) and fourth place (1976, 1978) in the Nacional Championship, and third place (1980) in the Metropolitano Championship. The Metropolitano and Nacional championships were Argentine football tournaments that existed between 1967 and 1984. The Metropolitano formed one half of the Argentine 1st division taking place in the first half of the year, while the Nacional took place in the 2nd half of the year.

Galván left the Talleres in 1982 after giving a 12-year service to the club, and went on to play for a string of provincial teams including Talleres' main rivals Belgrano de Córdoba.

In 1986 Galván moved to Bolivia to play for Bolívar in La Paz, but his stay there didn't last long, and he returned to play for Talleres in 1987. He left professional football to play for Sportivo Fernandez in his home province of Santiago del Estero in 1988, and finally for Talleres de Jesus Maria in 1989, where he retired from football at the age of 41.

== International career ==
Galván played his first game of his eight-year international career for Argentina in 1975. He played for Argentina at the 1975 Pan American Games.

The indisputable highlight of his footballing career came in 1978 when he was selected to represent Argentina at the 1978 FIFA World Cup. He played all games in the tournament alongside captain Daniel Passarella which included the World Cup Final in the Monumental, where Argentina beat the Netherlands 3–1 after extra time, to win their first World Cup.

Galván was selected to play for Argentina at the 1982 FIFA World Cup, but the albicelestes had a disappointing campaign, eliminated in the 2nd group phase. He retired from international football one year later in 1983, at the age of 35. Galván made a total of 34 appearances for Argentina.

== Death ==
Galván died from complications of pneumonia on 5 May 2025, at the age of 77. He had been hospitalised in Córdoba in the preceding weeks due to kidney problems.

== Honours ==
Talleres de Córdoba

- Copa Hermandad: 1977
- Liga Cordobesa de Fútbol: 1974, 1975, 1976, 1977, 1978, 1979
- Argentine Primera División runner-up: 1977 Nacional

Loma Negra

- Liga de Fútbol de Olavarría: 1982

Argentina

- FIFA World Cup: 1978
