= Norma Abdala de Matarazzo =

Argentine politician

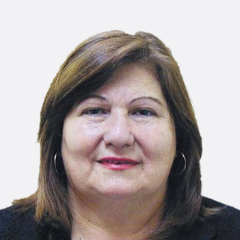

Provincial Deputy of Santiago del Estero
- Incumbent
- Assumed office 10 December 2021

National Deputy
- In office 10 December 2009 – 10 December 2021
- Constituency: Santiago del Estero

Mayor of Fernández
- In office 2009–2009
- Succeeded by: Ariel Matarazzo
- In office 2003–2006

Personal details
- Born: Norma Amanda Abdala; 13 April 1948 (age 78) Ingeniero Forres, Argentina
- Party: Civic Front for Santiago

Norma Amanda "Chuchi" Abdala de Matarazzo (born 13 April 1948) is an Argentine politician who sat as a member of the Argentine Chamber of Deputies from 2009 to 2021. She served as Second Vice President of the Chamber from 2011 to 2015. Since 2021, she has been a member of the Santiago del Estero provincial legislature.

She was born in Ingeniero Forres, Santiago del Estero into a family of Lebanese descent. She served as intendente (mayor) of Fernández from 2002 to 2009, and has been vice-president of the Santiago del Estero Justicialist Party since 2015.
