= Robles =

Robles (Spanish for "oaks") may refer to:

== Places ==
=== Argentina ===
- Robles Department

=== United States ===
- Robles Park, Tampa, Florida
- Paso Robles, California
- Robles Junction, Arizona

== Other uses ==
- Robles (surname), including a list of people with the name

== See also ==
- Los Robles (disambiguation)
