= Bekir Kaya =

Former Mayor of Van

Bekir Kaya (born 1977 in Ağrı) is a Kurdish politician of the Democratic Regions Party (DBP) and a former Mayor of Van.

== Education and professional career ==
Kaya studied at the faculty of Law at Dicle University and graduated from it in the year 1999. In Van he began to work as a lawyer He is married to Asli Kaya and father of 2 children. in the year 2001. He was elected deputy chair of the Van Bar Association.

== Political career ==
In 2009, Kaya was elected as the mayor of Van with 53,5% of the votes. In 2011 two earthquakes took place in Van province and the coordination of the distribution of the help to about 60`000 homeless people marked his first mayorship of Van. On 7 June 2012 Kaya, was detained and 4 days later arrested and included in what would become known the KCK-Trials over allegations of “being a member of a terrorist organization”. On 16 June 2012 thousands of people took to the street protesting against his arrest in Van. In April 2013 he was released pending trial and reinstated as mayor of Van. He was re-elected in the Turkish local elections 2014 with 53.1%. His second mandate was marked by the solidarity of the Kurdish population of Van with the uprising of Kurds against the Islamic State of Iraq and the Levant (ISIS) in Kobanî. On 4 January 2016 he was sentenced to 15 years imprisonment within KCK-Trials. He appealed the verdict and the Supreme Court of Appeals found Kaya not guilty in June 2017.

=== Political positions ===
Kaya was trying to improve the relations between Armenia and Turkey. The two countries have a different approach concerning to the Armenian genocide. While Turkey does not officially recognize an Armenian Genocide and Armenia claims Armenians have been victims of a Genocide. He visited the Armenian genocide memorial complex Tsitsernakaberd with a delegation of mayors on 3 August 2015.

=== Imprisonment and prosecution ===
But in November 2016 he was accused of neglecting fire, cleaning and transport services as protests in support for the resistance of Kurds against ISIS in Kobanî took place in Van and on 16 November 2016, he was dismissed as Mayor of Van and the administration of the Van Municipality was turned over to a trustee appointed by the Interior Ministry after. On 17 November, Kaya was detained and confronted with several charges. One charge was that he has erected a PKK martyr's memorial site in the Van cemetery. Because several Kurdish fighters who died in the fight against the Islamic State in Kobane and who were from the city of Van, were buried in the cemetery of Van. Another charge presented against him was the construction of a bridge beside an older bridge in bad shape to the Çatak district. By the prosecution, this was seen as a logistical support for the PKK. In September 2018 the previous verdict of the Supreme Court of Appeals in the KCK-Trial was overruled and Kaya was sentenced to 8 years and 9 months imprisonment. In October 2018 he got sentenced to another 8 years and 3 months for the charges brought against him since November 2016. He is imprisoned in the Silivri Prison.

He is married and father of 1 child.
