= Tsitsernakaberd =

Memorial complex dedicated to the victims of the Armenian genocide

Coordinates: 40°11′9″N 44°29′26″E

Armenian Genocide Memorial complex (Tsitsernakaberd)
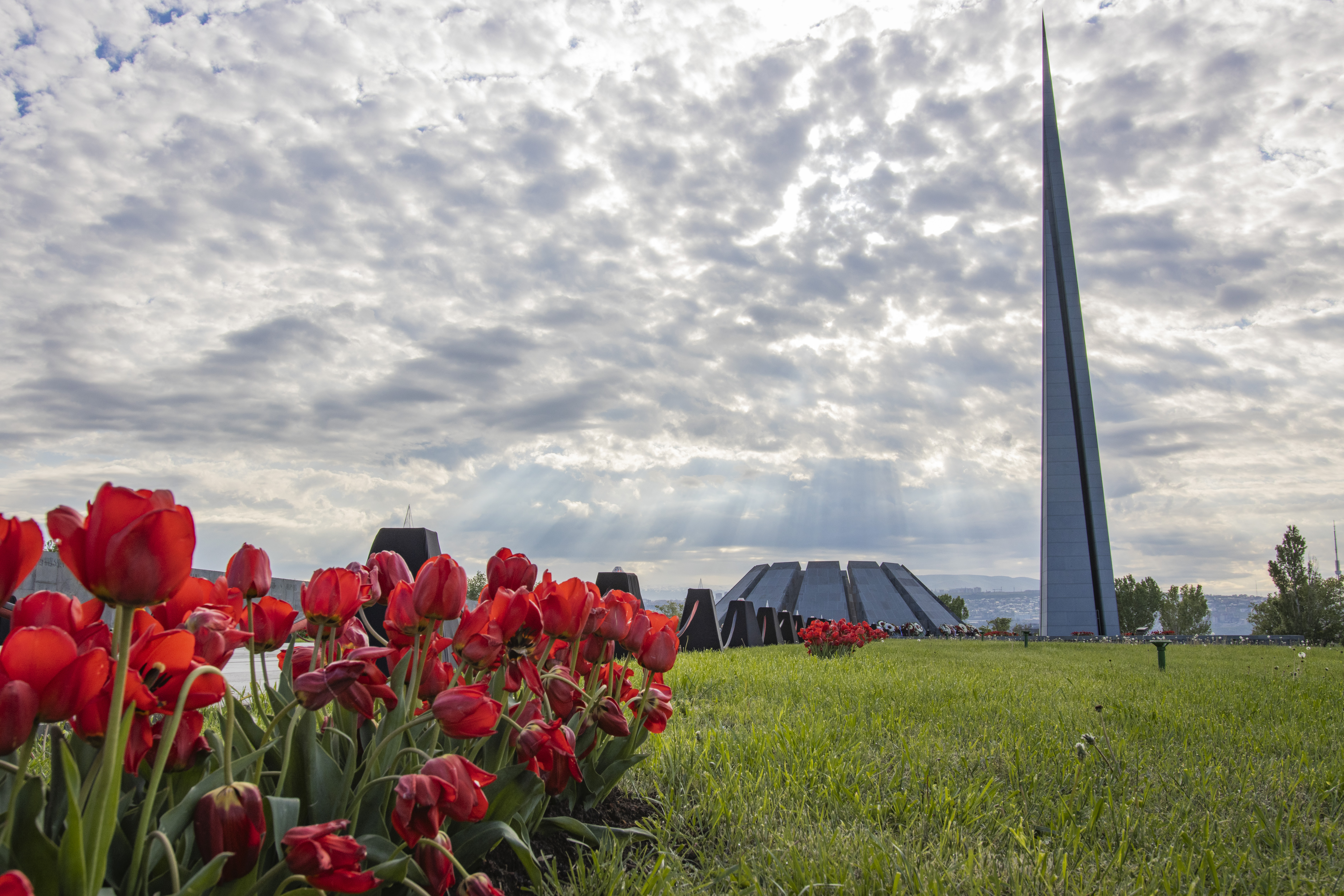
- The memorial complex
- Established: 1967 (memorial); 1995 (museum-institute)
- Location: Yerevan, Armenia
- Type: Memorial museum
- Visitors: ~200,000 (up to 150,000 people excluding 24 April)
- Director: Edita Gzoyan
- Architects: Arthur Tarkhanyan; Sashur Kalashyan
- Website: genocide-museum.am

The Armenian Genocide Memorial complex (Armenian: Հայոց ցեղասպանության զոհերի հուշահամալիր, Hayots tseghaspanutyan zoheri hushahamalir, or Ծիծեռնակաբերդ, Tsitsernakaberd) is Armenia's official memorial dedicated to the victims of the Armenian genocide, built in 1967 on the hill of Tsitsernakaberd (Swallow's fortress in English) (Armenian: Ծիծեռնակաբերդ) in Yerevan. Every year on 24 April, the Armenian Genocide Remembrance Day, thousands of Armenians gather at the memorial to commemorate the victims of the genocide. The people who gather in Tsiternakaberd lay fresh flowers out of respect for all the people who died in the Armenian genocide. Over the years, from around the world, a wide range of politicians, artists, musicians, athletes, and religious figures have visited the memorial.

== Name ==
According to legend, this hill received the name "Tsitsernakaberd" from the name of the swallows living here, who helped the Armenian pagan gods Vahagn and Astghik convey news to each other.

== History ==
The idea of a genocide monument has its origins in 1960, when Yakov Zarobyan succeeded Suren Tovmasyan as the first secretary of the Communist Party of Armenia. On 16 July 1964, historians Tsatur Aghayan (the director of the Armenian branch of the Institute of Marxism–Leninism), Hovhannes Injikian (head of the section of Oriental Studies of the Academy of Sciences), and John Kirakosyan (deputy head of the section of ideology of the Central Committee of the party) sent a highly confidential letter to the Presidium of the Communist Party of Armenia, where they made a series of proposal to commemorate the 50th anniversary of the genocide. Point 8 said: "To build the memorial of the victims of the Armenian people in World War I on account of the income of the population. The memorial must symbolize the rebirth of the Armenian people." On 13 December 1964, Zarobyan sent a report-letter to the Central Committee of the Communist Party of the Soviet Union, where the grounds and the meaning of the anniversary and the construction of the "monument dedicated to the Armenian martyrs sacrificed in World War I" were noted.

On 15 February 1965, the Armenian authorities adopted a resolution to complete a memorial honoring the 1.5 million Armenians who perished in the genocide. The 1965 Yerevan demonstrations and an unauthorized genocide commemoration in Moscow involving Silva Kaputikyan encouraged Soviet authorities to complete the monument in November 1967. The memorial was designed by architects Arthur Tarkhanyan, Sashur Kalashyan and artist Hovhannes Khachatryan.

== Design ==
The Armenian Genocide Memorial complex has three main structures: the Temple of Eternity, the memorial column, and the memorial wall.

=== Temple of Eternity ===
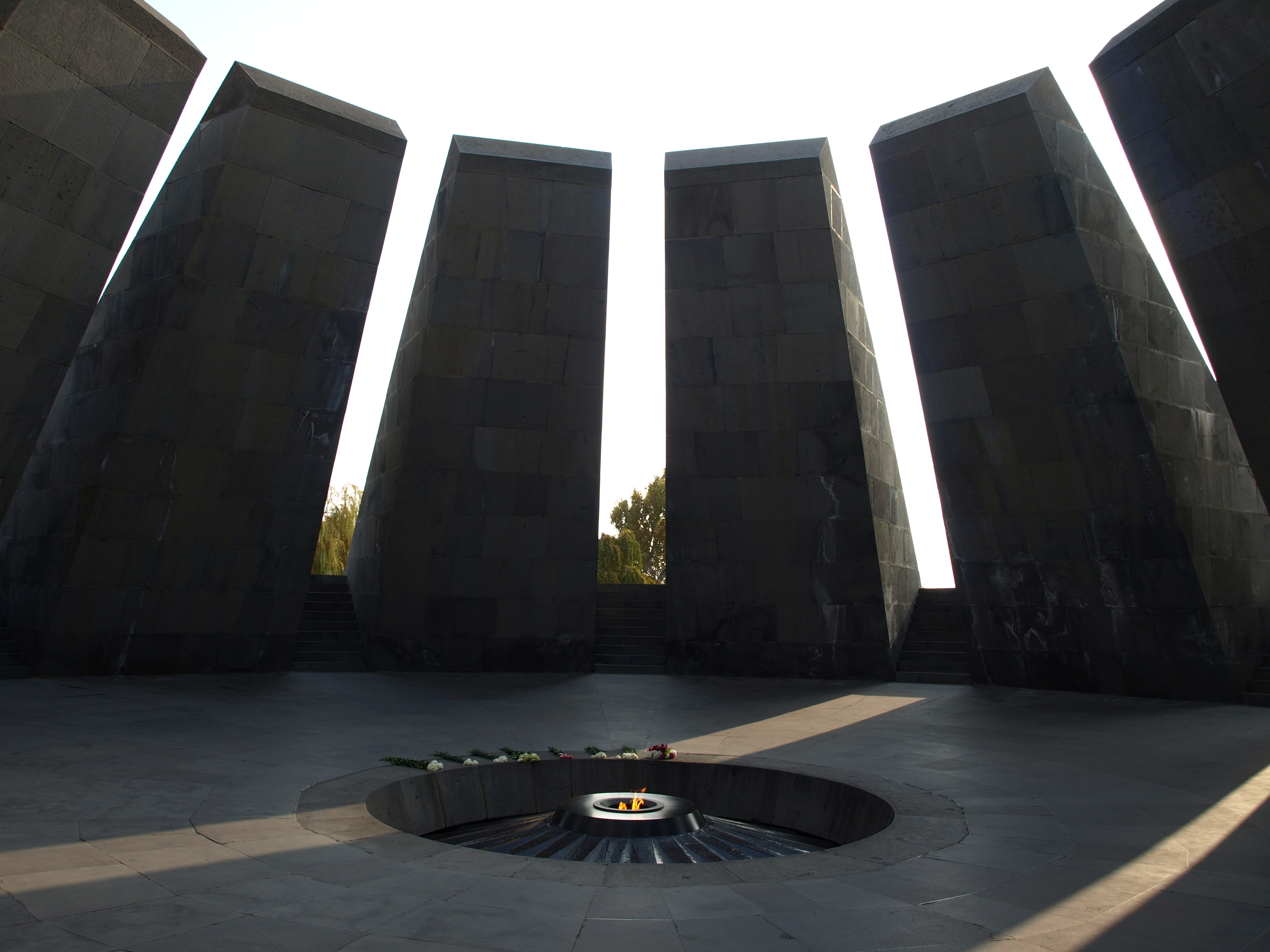
The Temple of Eternity

The Temple of Eternity consists of 12 stone slabs arranged in a circular shape, curved inward, with an eternal flame in the center. The number 12 was chosen based on geometric laws, but the people believe that these columns symbolize the 12 largest provinces in Western Armenia. In reality, the number of provinces of Western Armenia in the Ottoman Empire was six (Van, Erzurum, Diyarbakir, Bitlis, Sebastia, Kharberd), in addition to which there was a separate Cilicia as the vilayet of Adana.

=== Memorial column ===
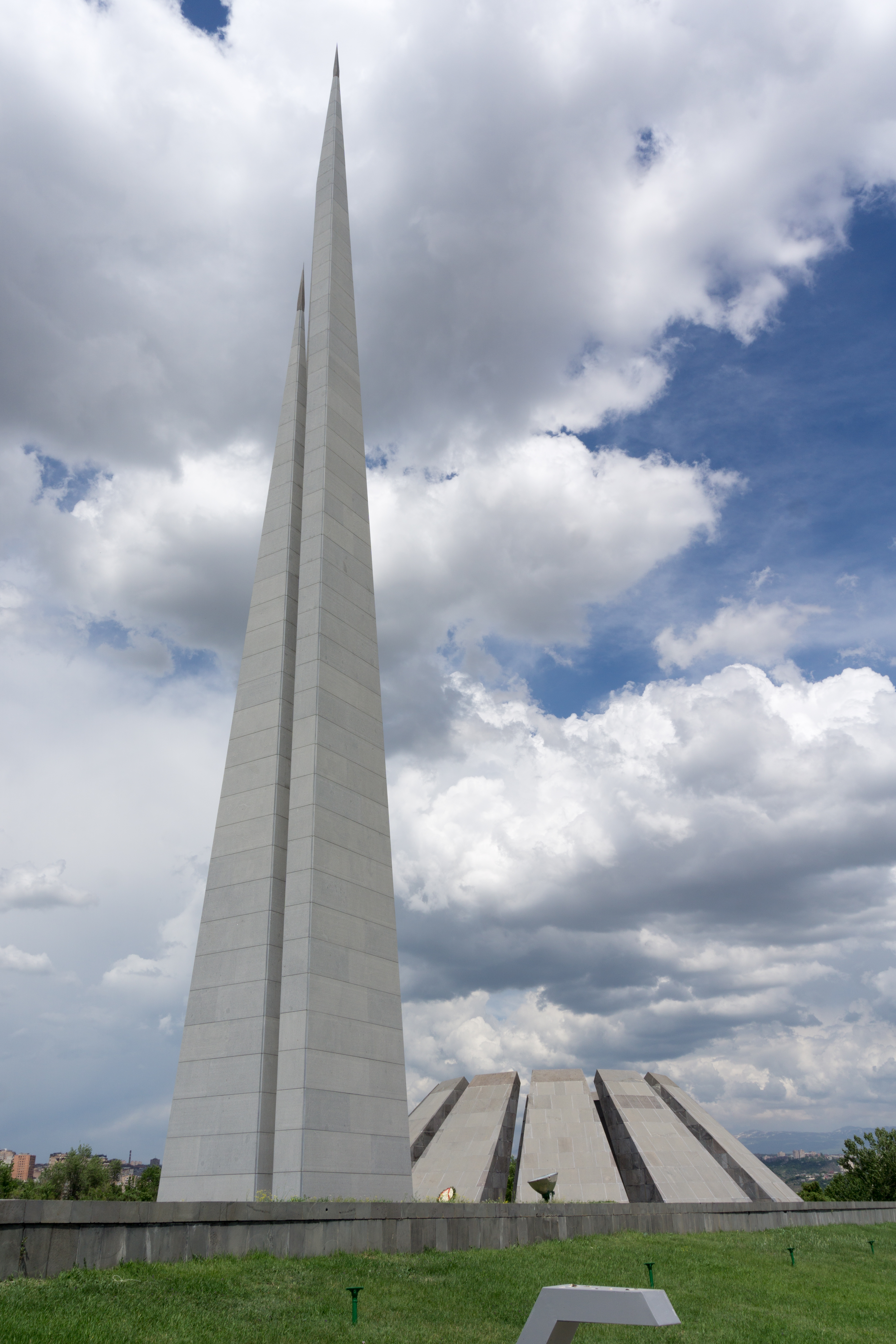
Memorial column

Next to the Temple of Eternity is the memorial column, which is 44 meters high. It is divided into two parts: the large and small monuments, which express the idea of the rebirth of the nation.

=== Memorial wall ===
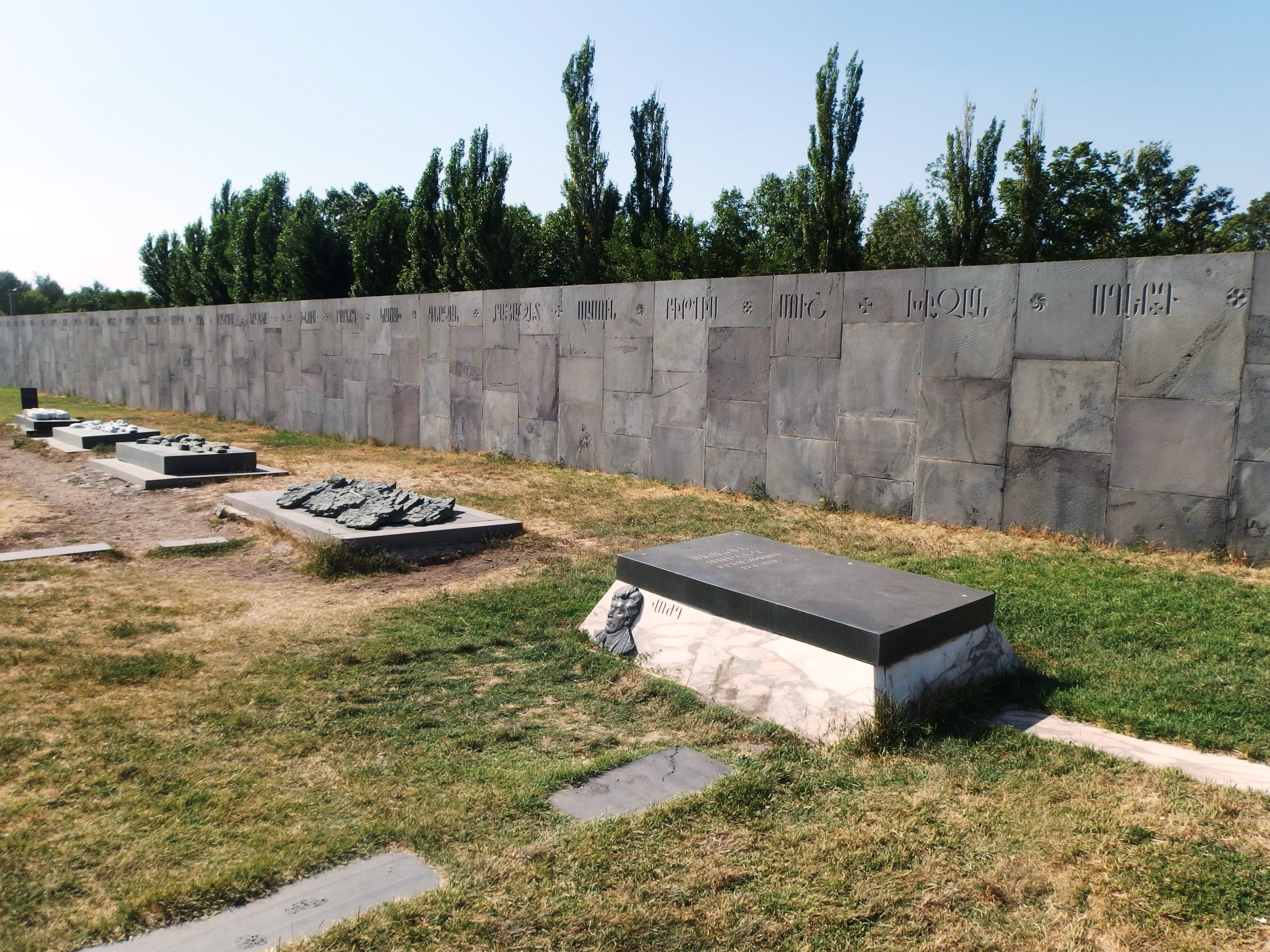
Memorial wall with the names of the settlements of Western Armenia where massacres took place

Along the park at the memorial there is a 100-meter wall with the names of towns and villages where massacres and deportations are known to have taken place. On the rear side of the commemoration wall, plates have been attached to honor the people who committed themselves to relieving the distress of the survivors during and after the genocide, among them Johannes Lepsius, Franz Werfel, Armin T. Wegner, Henry Morgenthau Sr., Fridtjof Nansen, Pope Benedict XV, Jakob Künzler and Bodil Biørn.

=== Alley of trees ===
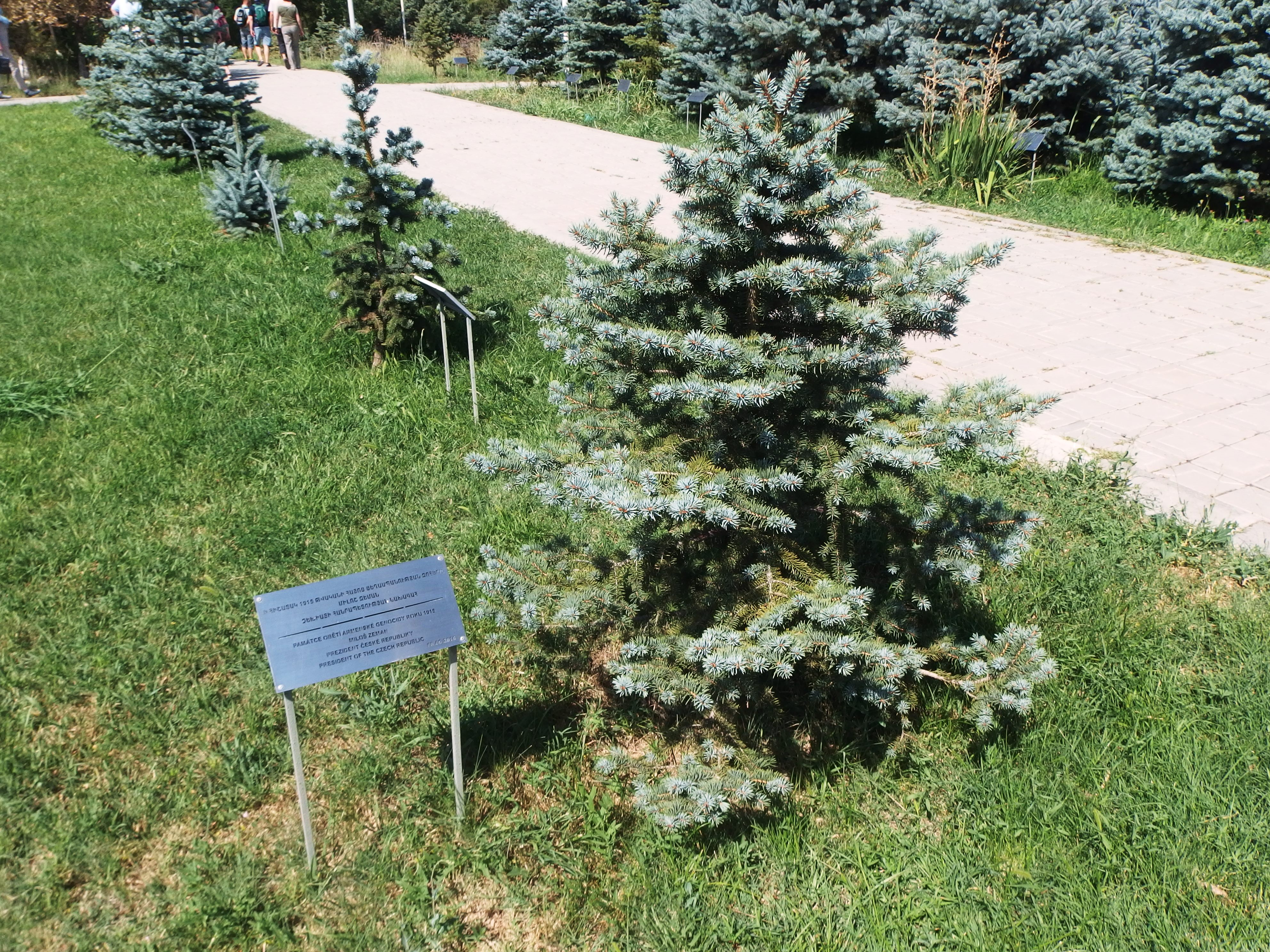
Trees planted in memory of the victims of the genocide

An alley of trees has been planted to commemorate the genocide victims.

== Armenian Genocide Museum-Institute ==
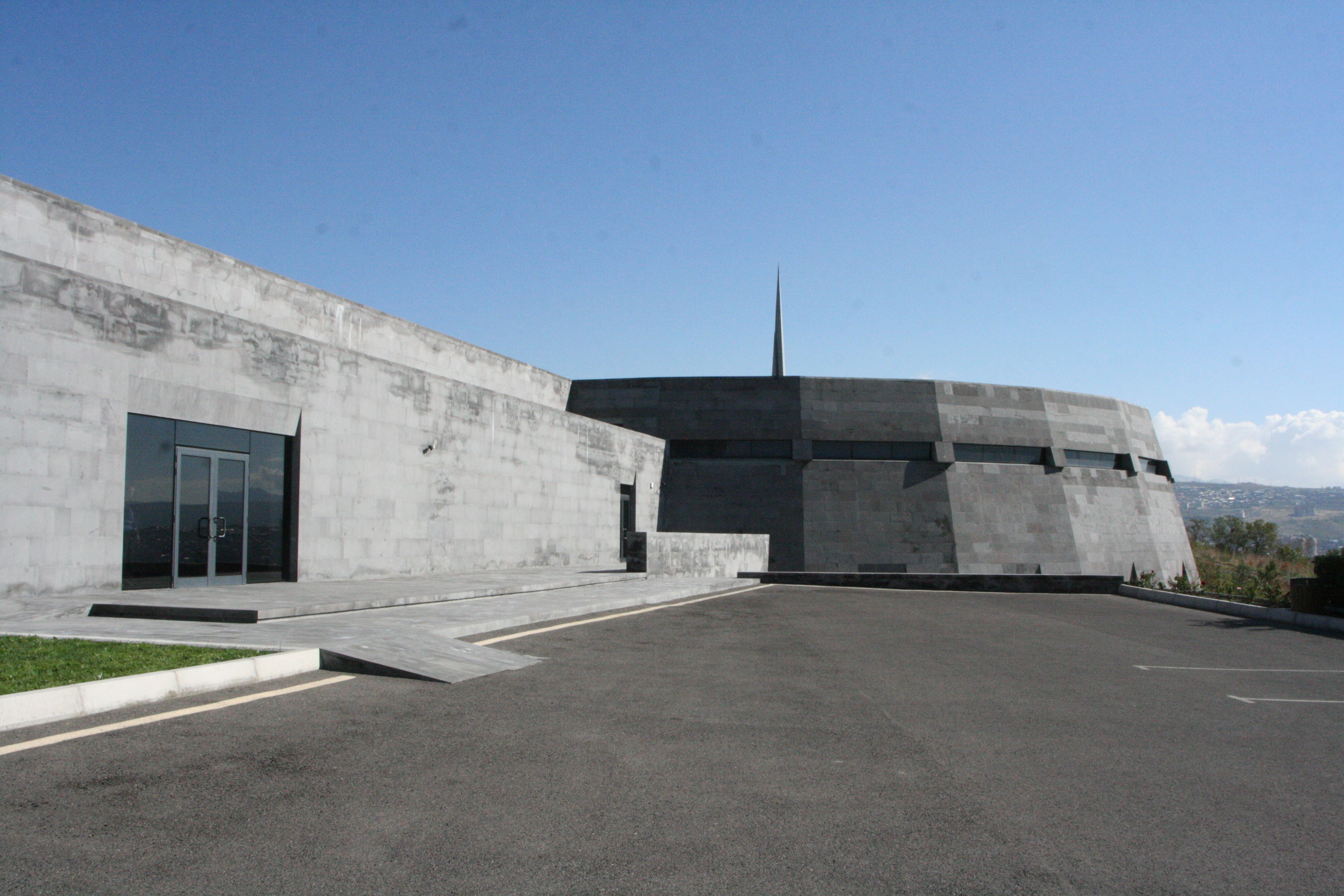
The main building of Armenian Genocide Museum-Institute

The Armenian Genocide Museum-Institute opened in 1995 on the occasion of the 80th anniversary of the genocide. The structure of the museum, planned by architects Sashur Kalashian, Lyudmila Mkrtchyan and sculptor F. Araqelyan, has followed a unique design. Since opening, the museum has received tens of thousands of visitors including schoolchildren, college students and huge numbers of tourists from outside Armenia. The Republic of Armenia has turned visiting the museum into part of state protocol and many official foreign delegations have already visited the museum. These delegations have included Pope John Paul II, Pope Francis, President of the Russian Federation Vladimir Putin, Presidents of France Jacques Chirac and Francois Hollande, and other well-known public and political figures. The museum contains historical documents and is open to the public for guided tours in Armenian, Russian, English, French, and German.

The two-story building is built directly into the side of a hill so as not to detract from the presence of the Genocide Monument nearby. The roof of the museum is flat and covered with concrete tiles. It overlooks the scenic Ararat Valley and majestic Mount Ararat. The first floor of the museum is subterranean and houses the administrative, engineering and technical maintenance offices as well as Komitas Hall, which seats 170 people. Here also are situated the storage rooms for museum artifacts and scientific objects, as well as a library and a reading hall. The museum exhibit is located on the second floor in a space just over 1,000 square meters in size. There are three main indoor exhibit halls and an outer gallery with its own hall. The Genocide Monument is designed to memorialize the victims. The Genocide Museum's mission is rooted in the understanding that the Armenian Genocide is important in preventing similar future tragedies, and in keeping with the notion that those who forget the past are condemned to repeat it.

The institute also conducts academic research into the genocide and publishes books on the subject and a journal, International Journal of Armenian Genocide Studies.

== The Armenian Genocide Memorial improvement project ==
The goal of the improvement project was to organize cultural, entertainment, and sports events that meet the needs of different groups of park visitors.

It is planned to build an open-air museum of ancient Armenian architecture in the park, where a large number of fragments of monuments and khachkars scattered throughout Armenia will be collected, an active recreation area that will open onto the Hrazdan Valley and be connected to the city via vertical transport and a cable car, a sports area with its structures, squares and an aquatic center and quiet recreation area planned on the western side of the park.

== See also ==
- 1965 Yerevan demonstrations
- List of visitors to Tsitsernakaberd
- Armenian Genocide Remembrance Day
- List of Armenian genocide memorials
- Yad Vashem (est. 1953), Holocaust memorial and research institute with a similar concept
