= Ingeniero Forres =

Coordinates: 27°53′S 63°58′W

- Municipality and village
- Interactive map of Ingeniero Forres
- Country: Argentina
- Province: Santiago del Estero
- Time zone: UTC−3 (ART)

Ingeniero Forres is a municipality and village in Santiago del Estero in Argentina.

== Origin of the name ==
Forres is a town in northern Scotland. The town's name is used in Argentina to commemorate Archibald Williamson (1860-1931), a merchant and partner of Balfour, Williamson & Co. of Liverpool, who traded with California, Peru, and Chile. In 1911, he was elected to the board of directors of the Central Argentine Railway Company. During his tenure on the board, the CAR company obtained the first concession for the Villa del Rosario to Garza line and the second from Córdoba and Villa del Rosario to Forres. In 1925, he became chairman of the board, a position he held until his death. He was raised to the Peerage in 1922 with the title of "Baron Forres of Glenogil" and was commonly referred to as "Lord Forres" ever since. In train timetables of the CAR, and after nationalisation in 1948, of the Mitre Railway, the railway station was always called "Forres," without ever adding "Ingeniero." In conclusion, there has never been a person named Forres, much less an engineer with that name associated with Argentina. Calling a town in the province of Santiago del Estero "Ingeniero Forres" is a grave mistake that demonstrates a profound ignorance of the town's history.
