= Los Robles, La Rioja =

Coordinates: 28°25′S 67°07′W

Los Robles
- Municipality and village
- Interactive map of Los Robles
- Country: Argentina
- Province: La Rioja Province
- Time zone: UTC−3 (ART)

Los Robles is a municipality and village in La Rioja Province in northwestern Argentina.
