= Robles Department =

- Department
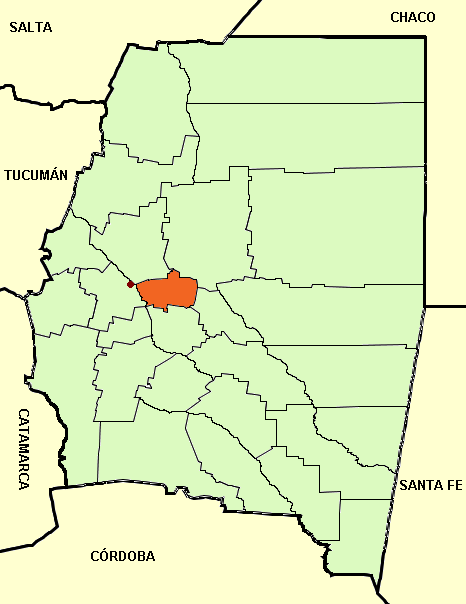
- Location of Robles Department within Santiago del Estero Province
- Coordinates: 27°55′04″S 63°53′43″W
- Country: Argentina
- Province: Santiago del Estero
- Head town: Fernández

Area
  - Total: 1,424 km^{2} (550 sq mi)

Population (2010)
  - Total: 44,415
  - Density: 31.19/km^{2} (80.78/sq mi)
- Time zone: UTC-3 (ART)

Robles Department (Spanish: Departamento Robles) is a department of Argentina in Santiago del Estero Province. The capital city of the department is situated in Fernández.
