= House at 1240 North Los Robles =

Historic house in California, United States

- U.S. National Register of Historic Places
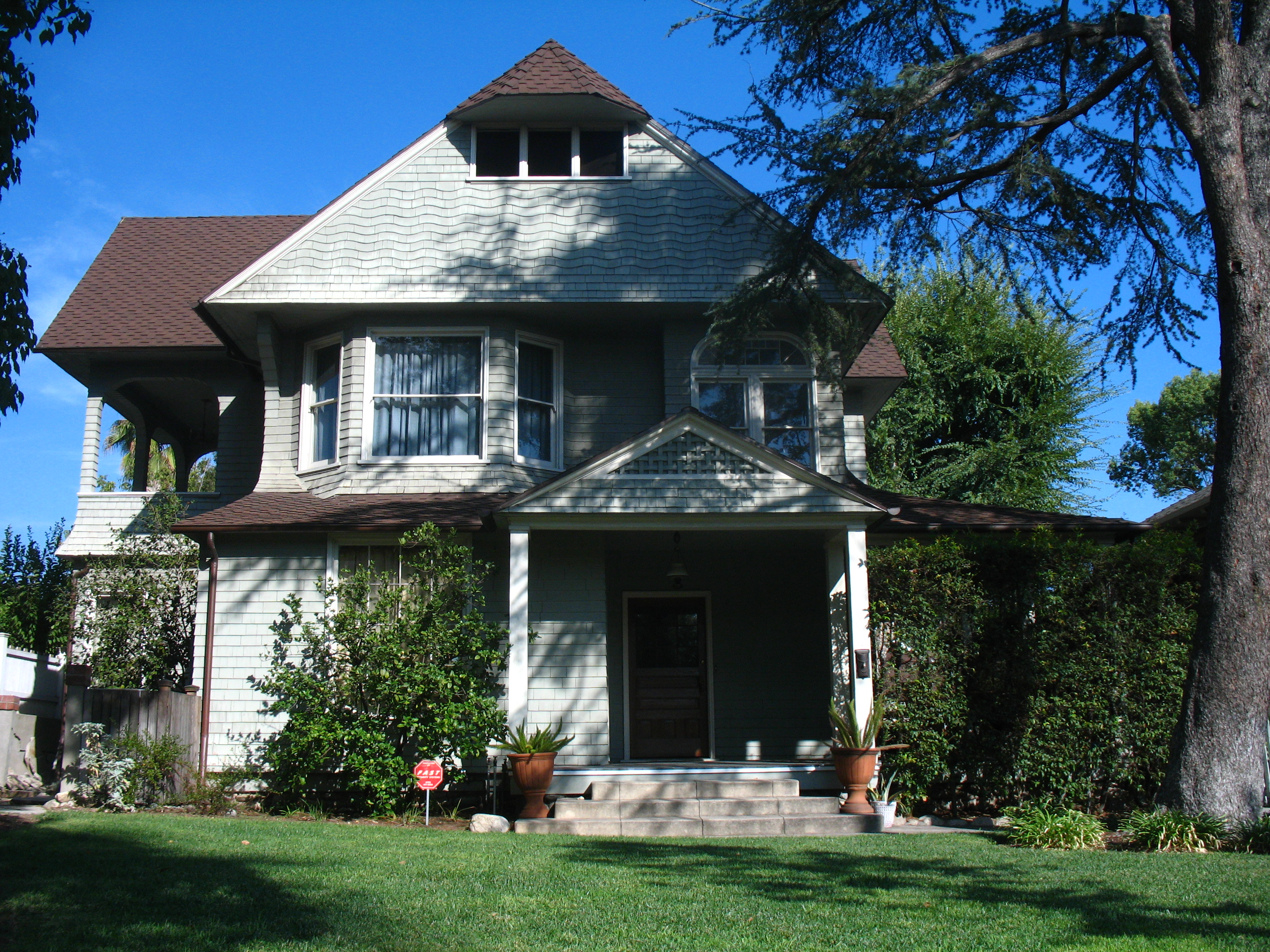

- Location within the Los Angeles metropolitan area Location within California Location within the United States
- Location: 1240 N. Los Robles Ave., Pasadena, California
- Coordinates: 34°10′2″N 118°8′29″W
- Area: less than one acre
- Built: 1896
- Architectural style: Shingle Style
- MPS: Residential Architecture of Pasadena: Influence of the Arts and Crafts Movement MPS
- NRHP reference No.: 04000329
- Added to NRHP: August 20, 2004

The House at 1240 North Los Robles is a historic house located at 1240 North Los Robles Avenue in Pasadena, California. The Shingle style house was built in 1896. The two-story wood-frame house has an irregular plan with a cross gabled roof. Projecting gable ends on the second story feature curved, shingled brackets; a porch under the north gable is supported by shingled columns. The house's exterior walls are shingled, and the shingles on the gable ends are arranged to form waves, an element of Queen Anne styling. Curved hoods, also covered in shingles, cover the windows on the front and southern gable ends.

The house was added to the National Register of Historic Places on August 20, 2004.
