= Fernández, Santiago del Estero =

Fernández
- Municipality and village
- Location within Argentina
- Coordinates: 27°55′S 63°53′W
- Country: Argentina
- Province: Santiago del Estero
- Department: Robles
- Time zone: UTC−3 (ART)
- Climate: BSh

Entrance arch of the city of Fernández

Fernández is a municipality and village in Santiago del Estero Province in Argentina.
